= 2009–10 SK Sigma Olomouc season =

Sigma Olomouc
2009–10 season
- Manager: Zdeněk Psotka
- Stadium: Andrův stadion
- Czech First League: 6th
- Czech Cup: Semi-finals
- UEFA Europa League: Play-off round
- Top goalscorer: League: Michal Ordoš (12)
- Average home league attendance: 4,079
- Biggest win: 5–0 v Protivanov (Away, 23 September 2009, Czech Cup); 5–0 v Brno (Home, 18 October 2009, Czech First League)
- Biggest defeat: 0–4 v Everton (Away, 20 August 2009, UEFA Europa League); 0–4 v Sparta Prague (Away, 20 March 2010, Czech First League)

The 2009–10 season was Sportovní Klub Sigma Olomouc's 17th consecutive season in the Czech First League. In addition to the domestic league, Sigma Olomouc participated in that season's editions of the Czech Cup and the UEFA Europa League.

== Squad ==
Squad at end of season

Note: Flags indicate national team as defined under FIFA eligibility rules; some limited exceptions apply. Players may hold more than one non-FIFA nationality.

No.	Pos.	Nation	Player
1	GK	CZE	Martin Blaha
2	DF	CZE	Milan Machalický
3	DF	CZE	Pavel Dreksa
4	DF	CZE	Martin Komárek
5	DF	SVK	Marek Kaščák
6	MF	SVK	Ladislav Onofrej
7	FW	CZE	Michal Ordoš
8	MF	BRA	Daniel Rossi
9	FW	CZE	Tomáš Kazár
10	FW	CZE	Michal Hubník
11	FW	CZE	Jan Schulmeister
12	DF	CZE	Aleš Škerle
14	MF	CZE	Vojtěch Štěpán
15	DF	CZE	Jakub Heidenreich

No.	Pos.	Nation	Player
16	MF	CZE	Lukáš Bajer
17	MF	CZE	Tomáš Hořava
18	GK	CZE	Petr Drobisz
19	DF	CZE	Ondřej Murín
20	GK	SVK	Tomáš Lovásik
22	FW	CZE	Jakub Petr
23	MF	CZE	Tomáš Janotka
24	DF	CZE	Tomáš Nuc
25	FW	CZE	Jan Navrátil
26	FW	CZE	Václav Vašíček
28	DF	CZE	Tomáš Kalas
29	FW	CZE	Pavel Šultes
30	GK	CZE	Martin Šustr

== Competitions ==
=== Overview ===
Competition	First match	Last match	Starting round	Final position	Record							
Competition	First match	Last match	Starting round	Final position	Pld	W	D	L	GF	GA	GD	Win %
Czech First League	26 July 2009	15 May 2010	Matchday 1	6th	30	14	5	11	49	36	+13	46.67
Czech Cup	3 September 2009	28 April 2010	Second round	Semi-finals	8	5	2	1	17	7	+10	62.50
UEFA Europa League	16 July 2009	27 August 2009	Second qualifying round	Play-off round	6	3	2	1	12	7	+5	50.00
Total					44	22	9	13	78	50	+28	50.00

Source: Competitions

=== Czech First League ===
==== League table ====
Pos	Team	Pld	W	D	L	GF	GA	GD	Pts	Qualification or relegation
4	Teplice	30	15	10	5	44	25	+19	55	
5	Viktoria Plzeň	30	12	12	6	42	33	+9	48	Qualification for Europa League third qualifying round (Note: Viktoria Plzeň won the 2009–10 Czech Cup and qualified for the third qualifying round of the UEFA Europa League.)
6	Sigma Olomouc	30	14	5	11	49	36	+13	47	
7	Slavia Prague	30	11	8	11	37	35	+2	41	
8	Mladá Boleslav	30	11	6	13	47	41	+6	39	

Source: Fortuna liga
Rules for classification: 1) points; 2) goal difference; 3) number of goals scored.

==== Results summary ====
Overall								Home						Away					
Pld	W	D	L	GF	GA	GD	Pts	W	D	L	GF	GA	GD	W	D	L	GF	GA	GD
30	14	5	11	49	36	+13	47	9	3	3	30	11	+19	5	2	8	19	25	−6

Source: Competitions

==== Results by round ====
Round	1	2	3	4	5	6	7	8	9	10	11	12	13	14	15	16	17	18	19	20	21	22	23	24	25	26	27	28	29	30
Ground	A	H	A	H	A	H	A	H	H	A	H	A	H	A	H	A	H	A	H	A	H	A	A	H	A	H	A	H	A	H
Result	W	D	L	D	L	D	D	L	L	L	W	W	W	W	W	L	W	L	W	L	L	W	L	W	W	W	L	W	D	W
Position	1	3	9	8	12	11	12	12	13	13	13	11	11	8	7	9	7	8	7	7	9	7	8	7	7	6	6	6	6	6
Points	3	4	4	5	5	6	7	7	7	7	10	13	16	19	22	22	25	25	28	28	28	31	31	34	37	40	40	43	44	47

Source: Matches
A = Away; H = Home; W = Win; D = Draw; L = Loss

==== Matches ====
26 July 2009 1	Bohemians Prague (Střížkov)	0–2	Sigma Olomouc	Prague
	Obermajer (yellow card) 46'; Macháček (yellow card) 73'	Report	Rossi 9'; Šultes (yellow card) 47'; Hořava (yellow card) 52'; Janotka 65'	Stadium: Stadion Evžena Rošického; Attendance: 1,820; Referee: Libor Kovařík; Assistant referees: Kryštof Mencl, Martin Večeřa

2 August 2009 2	Sigma Olomouc	0–0	Baník Ostrava	Olomouc
	Hubník (yellow card) 57' (red card) 76'; Dreksa (yellow card) 90'	Report	Nando (yellow card) 16' (red card) 26'; Zeher (yellow card) 64'; Bolf (yellow card) 82'	Stadium: Andrův stadion Attendance: 8,026; Referee: Radek Příhoda; Assistant referees: Robert Kubáň, Andreas Drastik

9 August 2009 3	Slovácko	2–0	Sigma Olomouc	Uherské Hradiště
	Švancara 6' (pen.), (yellow card) 75'; Kubáň (yellow card) 20'; Chmelíček 28'; Fujerik (yellow card) 54'; Abrahám (yellow card) 63'; Filipko (yellow card) 83'	Report	Onofrej (yellow card) 5'; Janotka (yellow card) 43'; Dreksa (yellow card) 75'	Stadium: Městský fotbalový stadion Miroslava Valenty; Attendance: 7,258; Referee: Drahoslav Drábek; Assistant referees: Antonín Kordula, Zdeněk Dobrovolný

16 August 2009 4	Sigma Olomouc	1–1	Bohemians 1905	Olomouc
	Ordoš 19', (yellow card) 53'	Report	Štohanzl 26'; Hartig (yellow card) 41'; Ibragimov (yellow card) 52'	Stadium: Andrův stadion Attendance: 4,880; Referee: Jiří Jech; Assistant referees: Emil Ubias, Petr Slavík

23 August 2009 5	Příbram	2–1	Sigma Olomouc	Příbram
	Müller (yellow card) 30'; Pleško 66'; Šmejkal 72'; Klesa (yellow card) 87'; Rodrigues (yellow card) 89'	Report	Hubník (yellow card) 9'; Rossi (yellow card) 40'; Dreksa 49', (yellow card) 71'; Onofrej (yellow card) 73'	Stadium: Na Litavce; Attendance: 2,386; Referee: Miroslav Zelinka; Assistant referees: Martin Wilczek, Libor Novák

31 August 2009 6	Sigma Olomouc	1–1	Sparta Prague	Olomouc
	Otepka (yellow card) 6'; Petr (yellow card) 71'; Ordoš 73'	Report	Hubník 24', (yellow card) 49'; Kušnír (yellow card) 79'; Vacek (yellow card) 88'	Stadium: Andrův stadion Attendance: 6,636; Referee: Jan Jílek; Assistant referees: Martin Večeřa, Emanuel Marek

14 September 2009 7	Mladá Boleslav	2–2	Sigma Olomouc	Mladá Boleslav
	Kulič 24'; Táborský 86' (pen.)	Report	Hubník (yellow card) 33'; Otepka (yellow card) 35'; Petr 41'; Janotka 55'; Onofrej (yellow card) 57'	Stadium: Městský stadion Attendance: 3,280; Referee: Radek Příhoda; Assistant referees: Antonín Kordula, Josef Košec

20 September 2009 8	Sigma Olomouc	1–2	Kladno	Olomouc
	Rossi (yellow card) 20'; Dreksa (yellow card) 52'; Bajer 77' (pen.)	Report	Procházka 6'; Holub 48'	Stadium: Andrův stadion Attendance: 3,655; Referee: Roman Hrubeš; Assistant referees: Petr Čecháček, Andreas Drastik

27 September 2009 9	Sigma Olomouc	0–1	Jablonec	Olomouc
	Škerle (yellow card) 32'	Report	Lafata (yellow card) 31'; Jarolím 86'	Stadium: Andrův stadion Attendance: 3,712; Referee: Radek Matějek; Assistant referees: Emil Ubias, Ondřej Pelikán

3 October 2009 10	Viktoria Plzeň	1–0	Sigma Olomouc	Plzeň
	Ševínský (yellow card) 28'; Horváth (yellow card) 36'; Bakoš (yellow card) 40', (goal) 73'; Petržela (yellow card) 54'	Report	Rossi (yellow card) 12'; Komárek (yellow card) 19'; Kaščák (yellow card) 75'; Škerle (yellow card) 90'	Stadium: Stadion města Plzně; Attendance: 3,105; Referee: Jiří Adam; Assistant referees: Drahoslav Handlíř, Robert Kubáň

18 October 2009 11	Sigma Olomouc	5–0	Brno	Olomouc
	Ordoš 10', 53'; Šultes 39'; Petr 43'; Hořava 86'	Report		Stadium: Andrův stadion Attendance: 3,456; Referee: Dagmar Damková; Assistant referees: Zdeněk Dobrovolný, Libor Kovařík

26 October 2009 12	Slavia Prague	1–2	Sigma Olomouc	Prague
	Hloušek 31'; Vomáčka (yellow card) 90'	Report	Hořava 3'; Šultes 29'; Kaščák (yellow card) 37' (red card) 61'; Janotka (yellow card) 44'; Dreksa (yellow card) 74'; Lovásik (yellow card) 90'; Ordoš (yellow card) 90'; Škerle (yellow card) 90'	Stadium: Synot Tip Arena; Attendance: 9,159; Referee: Libor Kovařík; Assistant referees: Miroslav Zlámal, Martin Wilczek

1 November 2009 13	Sigma Olomouc	2–0	Dynamo České Budějovice	Olomouc
	Ordoš 21'; Onofrej (yellow card) 45'; Hubník 46'	Report	Žižka (yellow card) 38'; Riegel (yellow card) 68'	Stadium: Andrův stadion Attendance: 3,186; Referee: Tomáš Adámek; Assistant referees: Jaroslav Moudrý, Ivan Teuber

7 November 2009 14	Slovan Liberec	0–4	Sigma Olomouc	Liberec
		Report	Ordoš 29'; Šultes 32', 60'; Rossi 53'	Stadium: Stadion u Nisy; Attendance: 2,617; Referee: Jiří Jech; Assistant referees: Drahoslav Handlíř, Václav Štěrba

23 November 2009 15	Sigma Olomouc	6–2	Teplice	Olomouc
	Šultes 24'; Ordoš 27', 74'; Rossi (yellow card) 47'; Dreksa 52', 81'; Škerle (yellow card) 58'; Janotka 87' (pen.)	Report	Mahmutović 43'; Klein 59'; Lukáš (yellow card) 62'	Stadium: Andrův stadion Attendance: 3,762; Referee: Michal Paták; Assistant referees: Antonín Kordula, Dušan Pospíšil

30 November 2009 16	Baník Ostrava	2–0	Sigma Olomouc	Ostrava
	Lička 12'; Lukeš (yellow card) 21'; Nando (yellow card) 40'; Kraut 89'	Report	Ordoš (yellow card) 13'; Kaščák (yellow card) 53'	Stadium: Bazaly; Attendance: 7,994; Referee: Jiří Adam; Assistant referees: Josef Košec, Emanuel Marek

28 February 2010 17	Sigma Olomouc	1–0	Slovácko	Olomouc
	Ordoš 57'; Dreksa (yellow card) 72'	Report		Stadium: Andrův stadion Attendance: 4,774; Referee: Dagmar Damková; Assistant referees: Martin Večeřa, Zdeněk Dobrovolný

6 March 2010 18	Bohemians 1905	2–0	Sigma Olomouc	Prague
	Kaufman 9'; Štohanzl 39'; Bálek (yellow card) 54'; Rychlík (yellow card) 86'	Report	Schulmeister (yellow card) 79'	Stadium: Ďolíček; Referee: Tomáš Adámek; Assistant referees: Luděk Lhoták, Emanuel Marek

14 March 2010 19	Sigma Olomouc	3–1	Příbram	Olomouc
	Nohýnek 12' (o.g.); Šultes 62', 65'	Report	Hušbauer 40'; Huňa (yellow card) 56' (red card) 57'; Štochl (yellow card) 68'	Stadium: Andrův stadion Attendance: 3,378; Referee: Roman Hrubeš; Assistant referees: Miroslav Zlámal, Roman Tacina

20 March 2010 20	Sparta Prague	4–0	Sigma Olomouc	Prague
	Žofčák 35' (pen.), (yellow card) 48'; Sionko 45', 67'; Bony 58'; Lačný (yellow card) 83'	Report	Janotka (yellow card) 32'; Dreksa (red card) 34'; Škerle (yellow card) 35'; Rossi (yellow card) 40'	Stadium: Generali Arena; Attendance: 10,404; Referee: Tomáš Kocourek; Assistant referees: Josef Košec, Ladislav Gallo

24 March 2010 21	Sigma Olomouc	1–2	Mladá Boleslav	Olomouc
	Rolko 5' (o.g.); Ordoš (yellow card) 59'; Hubník (yellow card) 73'; Komárek (yellow card) 81'	Report	Rolko (yellow card) 27'; Chramosta 57'; Poláček (yellow card) 67'; Kalina 85'	Stadium: Andrův stadion Attendance: 3,931; Referee: Miroslav Zelinka; Assistant referees: Libor Novák, Gustav Santarius

28 March 2010 22	Kladno	2–3	Sigma Olomouc	Kladno
	Holub (yellow card) 47', (goal) 60'; Procházka 49'; Beneš (yellow card) 68'; Bartoš (yellow card) 75'	Report	Šultes 50'; Schulmeister 54'; Kaščák (yellow card) 65'; Rossi 73'; Blaha (yellow card) 76'; Nuc (yellow card) 83'	Stadium: Stadion Františka Kloze; Attendance: 2,054; Referee: Jan Jílek; Assistant referees: Petr Vysloužil, Tomáš Lakomý

3 April 2010 23	Jablonec	3–1	Sigma Olomouc	Jablonec nad Nisou
	Jarolím 37'; Eliáš 41'; Haurdić 86', (yellow card) 86'	Report	Petr 28'; Dreksa (yellow card) 37'; Komárek (yellow card) 49'	Stadium: Stadion Střelnice; Attendance: 2,735; Referee: Michal Paták; Assistant referees: Dušan Pospíšil, Zdeněk Dobrovolný

11 April 2010 24	Sigma Olomouc	1–0	Viktoria Plzeň	Olomouc
	Hubník 34'; Heidenreich (yellow card) 48'; Bajer (yellow card) 72'	Report	Limberský (yellow card) 54'	Stadium: Andrův stadion Attendance: 3,370; Referee: Pavel Královec; Assistant referees: Ladislav Gallo, Jiří Jiřík

17 April 2010 25	Brno	1–2	Sigma Olomouc	Brno
	Polách (yellow card) 47'; Dostálek 66' (pen.), (yellow card) 85'	Report	Navrátil 7', 67'; Schulmeister (yellow card) 22'	Stadium: Městský fotbalový stadion Srbská; Attendance: 2,407; Referee: Radek Matějek; Assistant referees: Martin Wilczek, Zdeněk Koval

25 April 2010 26	Sigma Olomouc	3–1	Slavia Prague	Olomouc
	Šultes (yellow card) 38', (goal) 64'; Hubník 70', 80', (yellow card) 80'	Report	Ivanovski 24', (yellow card) 75'; Tecl (yellow card) 62'; Mareš (yellow card) 84'	Stadium: Andrův stadion Attendance: 6,037; Referee: Jaroslav Bílek; Assistant referees: Andreas Drastik, Michal Urban

2 May 2010 27	Dynamo České Budějovice	2–1	Sigma Olomouc	České Budějovice
	Otepka 45'; Volešák 86'	Report	Petr 48', (yellow card) 80'; Ordoš (yellow card) 58'; Janotka (yellow card) 69'; Komárek (yellow card) 74'; Navrátil (yellow card) 76'	Stadium: Stadion Střelecký ostrov Attendance: 3,046; Referee: Petr Mikel; Assistant referees: Libor Novák, Tomáš Lakomý

5 May 2010 28	Sigma Olomouc	2–0	Slovan Liberec	Olomouc
	Hubník 17'; Ordoš 43' (pen.)	Report	Liška (yellow card) 68'	Stadium: Andrův stadion Attendance: 3,013; Referee: Tomáš Adámek; Assistant referees: Martin Večeřa, Jiří Jiřík

8 May 2010 29	Teplice	1–1	Sigma Olomouc	Teplice
	Vachoušek 44' (pen.); Došek (yellow card) 81'	Report	Bajer (yellow card) 27'; Škerle (yellow card) 29' (red card) 43'; Navrátil 30'	Stadium: Na Stínadlech; Attendance: 3,940; Referee: Petr Mikel; Assistant referees: Kryštof Mencl, Ivan Teuber

15 May 2010 30	Sigma Olomouc	3–0	Bohemians Prague (Střížkov)	Olomouc
	Ordoš 15', 79'; Navrátil 40'; Hořava (yellow card) 61'; Petr (yellow card) 84'	Report	Pospíšil (yellow card) 12'; Demeter (yellow card) 50'; Fenyk (yellow card) 84'; Modeste (yellow card) 84'	Stadium: Andrův stadion Attendance: 3,449; Referee: Miroslav Zelinka; Assistant referees: Ondřej Pelikán, Pavel Peřina

=== Czech Cup ===
3 September 2009 Second round	Líšeň	1–3	Sigma Olomouc	Brno
		Report		Stadium: Stadion SK Líšeň

23 September 2009 Third round	Protivanov	0–5	Sigma Olomouc	Protivanov
		Report		Stadium: TJ Sokol Drahanovice

==== Fourth round ====
8 October 2009 First leg	Znojmo	1–3	Sigma Olomouc	Znojmo
		Report		Stadium: Městský stadion

28 October 2009 Second leg	Sigma Olomouc	0–0 (3–1 agg.)	Znojmo	Olomouc
		Report		Stadium: Andrův stadion
Note: Sigma Olomouc won 3–1 on aggregate.

==== Quarter-finals ====
31 March 2010 First leg	Slovan Liberec	0–2	Sigma Olomouc	Liberec
	Kelić (yellow card) 34'; Papoušek (yellow card) 65'; Dočkal (yellow card) 73'	Report	Kaščák (yellow card) 25'; Šultes 30', 36'; Komárek (yellow card) 68'	Stadium: Stadion u Nisy

7 April 2010 Second leg	Sigma Olomouc	1–0 (3–0 agg.)	Slovan Liberec	Olomouc
	Komárek 21'; Kaščák (yellow card) 31'	Report	Papoušek (yellow card) 42'; Polák (yellow card) 64'; Nezmar (yellow card) 65'; Dočkal (yellow card) 68'	Stadium: Andrův stadion
Note: Sigma Olomouc won 3–0 on aggregate.

==== Semi-finals ====
21 April 2010 First leg	Viktoria Plzeň	2–2	Sigma Olomouc	Plzeň
	Horváth 29'; Kolář 38'; Bystroň (red card) 66'	Report	Ordoš 31'; Janotka 66' (pen.); Onofrej (yellow card) 77'; Hořava (yellow card) 89'; Šultes (yellow card) 90'	Stadium: Stadion města Plzně

28 April 2010 Second leg	Sigma Olomouc	1–3 (3–5 agg.)	Viktoria Plzeň	Olomouc
	Hořava (yellow card) 28'; Dreksa (yellow card) 35'; Onofrej (yellow card) 63'; Škerle (yellow card) 64'; Navrátil 80'	Report	Rezek 19' (pen.); Střihavka 23'; Daněk (yellow card) 33'; Petržela 49'; Rajtoral (yellow card) 65'	Stadium: Andrův stadion
Note: Viktoria Plzeň won 5–3 on aggregate.

=== UEFA Europa League ===
==== Qualifying rounds ====
===== Second qualifying round =====
16 July 2009 First leg	Sigma Olomouc (Czech Republic)	1–1	(Iceland) Fram	Olomouc, Czech Republic
19:00 CEST (UTC+2)	Petr (yellow card) 6'; Dreksa (yellow card) 26'; Rossi (yellow card) 55', (goal) 89'	Report	Fjóluson (yellow card) 21'; McShane (yellow card) 34'; Júlíusson (yellow card) 90+2'	Stadium: Andrův stadion Attendance: 5,719; Referee: Daniel Stalhammar (Sweden)

23 July 2009 Second leg	Fram (Iceland)	0–2 (1–3 agg.)	(Czech Republic) Sigma Olomouc	Reykjavík, Iceland
20:00 WEST (UTC+1)	Tillen (yellow card) 50'; Ólason (yellow card) 57'; Fjóluson (yellow card) 60'	Report	Hubník (yellow card) 47'; Otepka (yellow card) 57'; Onofrej (yellow card) 70'; Caihame (yellow card) 79'	Stadium: Laugardalsvöllur; Attendance: 1,226; Referee: Paulo Costa (Portugal)
Note: Sigma Olomouc won 3–1 on aggregate.

===== Third qualifying round =====
30 July 2009 First leg	Aberdeen (Scotland)	1–5	(Czech Republic) Sigma Olomouc	Aberdeen, Scotland
19:45 BST (UTC+1)	Mulgrew 23'; Foster (yellow card) 76'	Report	Hubník 18'; Janotka (yellow card) 48'; Bajer 65'; Petr 69'; Ordoš 83'; Heidenreich (yellow card) 88'; Hořava 90'	Stadium: Pittodrie Stadium; Attendance: 13,973; Referee: Jérôme Laperriere (Switzerland)

6 August 2009 Second leg	Sigma Olomouc (Czech Republic)	3–0 (8–1 agg.)	(Scotland) Aberdeen	Olomouc, Czech Republic
20:00 CEST (UTC+2)	Janotka 5'; Kaščák 13' (pen.); Hubník 45+1'; Ordoš (penalty missed) 48'	Report	Langfield (yellow card) 46'; Foster (yellow card) 78'	Stadium: Andrův stadion Attendance: 7,405; Referee: Michael Weiner (Germany)
Note: Sigma Olomouc won 8–1 on aggregate.

==== Play-off round ====
20 August 2009 First leg	Everton (England)	4–0	(Czech Republic) Sigma Olomouc	Liverpool, England
20:00 BST (UTC+1)	Saha 34', 73'; Rodwell 40', 54'; Neville (yellow card) 61'	Report	Hubník (yellow card) 8'	Stadium: Goodison Park; Attendance: 27,433; Referee: Lucílio Batista (Portugal)

27 August 2009 Second leg	Sigma Olomouc (Czech Republic)	1–1 (1–5 agg.)	(England) Everton	Olomouc, Czech Republic
18:00 CEST (UTC+2)	Šultes 80'	Report	Hibbert (red card) 7'; Gosling (yellow card) 24'; Pienaar 44'	Stadium: Andrův stadion Attendance: 10,212; Referee: Fredy Fautrel (France)
Note: Everton won 5–1 on aggregate.
