= 2009–10 Czech Cup =

Pohár ČMFS

Tournament details
- Country: Czech Republic
- Teams: 125

Final positions
- Champions: Plzeň
- Runners-up: Jablonec

Tournament statistics
- Top goal scorer: David Lafata (7 goals)

The 2009–10 Czech Cup was the 17th edition of the annual football knockout tournament organized by the Czech Football Association of the Czech Republic. It began on 19 July 2009 with the preliminary round and ended with the final on 18 May 2010.

Jablonec prevailed in Generali Arena, Prague at the 18 May 2010 Cup defeating Viktoria Plzeň, 1–2. 8,233 in attendance.

== Teams ==
| Round | Clubs remaining | Clubs involved | Winners from previous round | New entries this round | Leagues entering at this round |
|---|---|---|---|---|---|
| Preliminary round | 125 | 26 | none | 26 | Levels 4 and 5 in football league pyramid |
| First round | 112 | 96 | 13 | 83 | Czech 2. Liga; Bohemian Football League; Moravian-Silesian Football League; Level 4 in football league pyramid |
| Second round | 64 | 64 | 48 | 16 | Czech First League |
| Third round | 32 | 32 | 32 | none | none |
| Fourth round | 16 | 16 | 16 | none | none |
| Quarter finals | 8 | 8 | 8 | none | none |
| Semi finals | 4 | 4 | 4 | none | none |
| Final | 2 | 2 | 2 | none | none |

== Preliminary round ==
| Team 1 | Score | Team 2 |
|---|---|---|
19 July 2009
| Radotín | 3–2 | Hořovicko |
| Dobrovice | 0–1 | Český Dub |
| Rudolfov | 0–2 | Třeboň |
| Chrást | 1–2 | Domažlice |
| Citice | 1–6 | Tachov |
| SIAD Souš | 1–4 | Brozany |
| Pěnčín u Jablonce | 0–2 | Nová Paka |
| SK Jičín | 2–0 | Převýšov |
| FK AS Pardubice | 0–4 | Živanice |
| Židenice | 2–0 | Rosice |
| Spytihněv | 1–0 | Uherský Brod |
| Pelhřimov | 0–2 | Velké Meziříčí |
21 July 2009
| Čeladná | 1–2 | Valašské Meziříčí |

== First round ==
| Team 1 | Score | Team 2 |
|---|---|---|
25 July 2009
| Radotín | 0–10 | Dukla Prague |
| Přední Kopanina | 2–3 | Králův Dvůr |
| Český Dub | 1–4 | Hlavice |
| Řevnice | 1–0 | Vyšehrad |
| Třeboň | 0–2 | Písek |
| Prachatice | 0–2 | Sezimovo Ústí |
| Domažlice | 3–4 | Karlovy Vary |
| Vilémov | 0–3 | Varnsdorf |
| Tachov | 3–3; 8–7 pen | Doubravka |
| Strakonice | 0–3 | Viktoria Žižkov |
| Brozany | 1–2 | Baník Sokolov |
| Kunice | 3–1 | Zenit Čáslav |
| N.Paka | 0–2 | Náchod-Deštné |
| Pěnčín-Turnov | 1–1; 4–3 pen | Nový Bydžov |
| SK Jičín | 3–6 | Dvůr Králové |
| Ústí nad Orlicí | 5–1 | Pardubice |
| Živanice | 0–0; 7–6 pen | Letohrad |
| Čelákovice | 2–1 | Vltavín |
| Meteor VIII. | 2–0 | Rakovník |
| Český Brod | 1–6 | Ovčáry |
| Admira | 3–1 | Velim |
| Votice | 0–0; 1–4 pen | Vlašim |
| Řezuz Děčín | 0–1 | Česká Lípa |
| Chomutov | 1–2 | Baník Most |
| Litvínov | 1–6 | Ústí nad Labem |
| Chrudim | 0–5 | Hradec Králové |
| Velké Meziříčí | 0–2 | Vysočina Jihlava |
| Třebíč | 4–2 | Žďár |
| Rousínov | 1–0 | Bystrc |
| Vyškov | 0–3 | Líšeň |
| Šardice | 0–0; 2–3 pen | Znojmo |
| Boskovice | 1–1; 2–4 pen | Protivanov |
| Viktoria Otrokovice | 0–5 | Tescoma Zlín |
| Blansko | 1–2 | Břeclav |
| Hranice | 1–5 | 1. HFK Olomouc |
| Židenice | 2–1 | Konice |
| Mikulovice | 0–3 | Zábřeh |
| Bludov | 0–9 | Uničov |
| Velké Losiny | 1–5 | Hlučín |
| Spytihněv | 2–2; 3–4 pen | Kroměříž |
| Napajedla | 0–3 | Mutěnice |
| Rýmařov | 1–4 | Fotbal Frýdek-Místek |
| Dolní Benešov | 0–3 | SFC Opava |
| Valašské Meziříčí | 2–1 | Havířov |
| Šumperk | 0–0; 4–5 pen | Vítkovice |
| Brumov | 2–1 | Slavičín |
| Orlová | 0–1 | Fotbal Třinec |
| Poruba MFK | 0–5 | MFK OKD Karviná |

== Second round ==
| Team 1 | Score | Team 2 |
|---|---|---|
2 September 2009
| Česká Lípa | 2–4 | Slavia Prague |
| Tachov | 1–1; 15–16 pen | Karlovy Vary |
| Třebíč | 2–2; 4–1 pen | Slovácko |
| Znojmo | 2–0 | Vysočina Jihlava |
| Hlavice | 0–3 | Jablonec |
| Řevnice | 0–0; 2–4 pen | Písek |
| Sezimovo Ústí | 0–2 | Dynamo České Budějovice |
| Viktoria Žižkov | 2–1 | Baník Sokolov |
| Meteor VIII. | 1–1; 2–4 pen | Příbram |
| Pěnčín-Turnov | 0–2 | Varnsdorf |
| Vlašim | 1–3 | Viktoria Plzeň |
| Králův Dvůr | 0–0; 1–4 pen | Dukla Prague |
| Čelákovice | 1–4 | Bohemians Prague |
| Admira | 0–3 | Hradec Králové |
| Dvůr Králové | 2–7 | Slovan Liberec |
| Rousínov | 0–3 | Tescoma Zlín |
| Líšeň | 1–3 | Sigma Olomouc |
| Protivanov | 1–1; 6–5 pen | Uničov |
| Baník Most | 1–1; 6–7 pen | Kladno |
| Židenice | 1–1; 5–6 pen | Břeclav |
| Ústí nad Labem | 1–4 | Teplice |
| Zábřeh | 1–2 | Hlučín |
| Kroměříž | 0–3 | Baník Ostrava |
| Mutěnice | 0–2 | SFC Opava |
| Živanice | 1–0 | Mladá Boleslav |
| Valašské Meziříčí | 0–2 | Vítkovice |
| Fotbal Frýdek-Místek | 1–2 | Brno |
| 1. HFK Olomouc | 1–4 | MFK OKD Karviná |
| Ovčáry | 2–2; 3–4 pen | Bohemians 1905 |
| Brumov | 0–5 | Fotbal Třinec |
| Kunice | 1–3 | Náchod-Deštné |
| Ústí n. Orlicí | 0–4 | Sparta Prague |

== Third round ==
| Team 1 | Score | Team 2 |
|---|---|---|
23 September 2009
| Karlovy Vary | 1–1; 4–5 pen | Slavia Prague |
| Třebíč | 0–1 | Znojmo |
| Písek | 1–1; 1–4 pen | Jablonec |
| Viktoria Žižkov | 0–1 | Dynamo České Budějovice |
| Varnsdorf | 0–1 | Příbram |
| Dukla Prague | 1–4 | Viktoria Plzeň |
| Hradec Králové | 2–1 | Bohemians Prague |
| Tescoma Zlín | 1–1; 1–3 pen | Slovan Liberec |
| Protivanov | 0–5 | Sigma Olomouc |
| Břeclav | 0–1 | Kladno |
| Hlučín | 1–3 | Teplice |
| SFC Opava | 1–1; 3–5 pen | Baník Ostrava |
| Sokol Živanice | 1–0 | Vítkovice |
| MFK OKD Karviná | 1–1; 5–4 pen | Brno |
| Fotbal Třinec | 0–1 | Bohemians 1905 |
| Náchod-Deštné | 0–6 | Sparta Prague |

== Fourth round ==
The first legs of the fourth round were played on 7 October 2009, and the second legs were played on 28 October 2009.

| Team 1 | Agg. | Team 2 | 1st leg | 2nd leg |
|---|---|---|---|---|
| Dynamo České Budějovice | 0–6 | Sparta Prague | 0–5 | 0–1 |
| Znojmo | 1–3 | Sigma Olomouc | 1–3 | 0–0 |
| Příbram | 2–0 | Baník Ostrava | 2–0 | 0–0 |
| Sokol Živanice | 4–11 | Jablonec | 3–6 | 1–5 |
| Hradec Králové | 2–4 | Teplice | 1–2 | 1–2 |
| Bohemians 1905 | 2–3 | Slovan Liberec | 1–2 | 1–1 |
| Kladno | 1–4 | Viktoria Plzeň | 0–3 | 1–1 |
| MFK OKD Karviná | 1–2 | Slavia Prague | 1–0 | 0–2 |

== Quarter-finals ==
The first legs of the quarter-finals were played on 31 March 2010, and the second legs were played on 7 April 2010.

| Team 1 | Agg. | Team 2 | 1st leg | 2nd leg |
|---|---|---|---|---|
| Slavia Prague | 2–0 | Sparta Prague | 1–0 | 1–0 |
| Teplice | 1–3 | Jablonec | 1–3 | 0–0 |
| Slovan Liberec | 0–3 | Sigma Olomouc | 0–2 | 0–1 |
| Viktoria Plzeň | 2–1 | Příbram | 1–0 | 1–1 |

=== First leg ===
| 31 March 2010 | Slovan Liberec | 0–2 | Sigma Olomouc | Liberec |
| 18:00 CEST | | Report | Šultes 30', 36' | Stadium: Stadion u Nisy; Attendance: 1,523; Referee: Jiří Adam |

| 31 March 2010 | Viktoria Plzeň | 1–0 | Příbram | Plzeň |
| 18:00 CEST | Bakoš 44' | Report | | Stadium: Štruncovy Sady Stadion; Attendance: 1,349; Referee: Pavel Franěk |

| 31 March 2010 | Teplice | 1–3 | Jablonec | Teplice |
| 18:00 CEST | Vondrášek 32' | Report | Jarolím 22'; Krejčí 31'; Lafata 40' | Stadium: Na Stínadlech; Attendance: 1,610; Referee: Karel Hrubeš |

| 1 April 2010 | Slavia Prague | 1–0 | Sparta Prague | Prague |
| 19:00 CEST | M. Černý 15' | Report | | Stadium: Synot Tip Arena; Attendance: 7,439; Referee: Dagmar Damková |

=== Second leg ===
| 7 April 2010 | Sigma Olomouc | 1–0 (3–0 agg.) | Slovan Liberec | Olomouc |
| 18:00 CEST | Komárek 21' | Report | | Stadium: Andrův stadion Attendance: 1,678; Referee: Libor Kovařík |

| 8 April 2010 | Příbram | 1–1 (1–2 agg.) | Viktoria Plzeň | Příbram |
| 17:00 CEST | Tarczal 90' | Report | Petržela 71' | Stadium: Na Litavce; Attendance: 1,200; Referee: Tomáš Kocourek |

| 8 April 2010 | Jablonec | 0–0 (3–1 agg.) | Teplice | Jablonec nad Nisou |
| 17:30 CEST | | Report | | Stadium: Stadion Střelnice; Attendance: 1,712; Referee: Pavel Královec |

| 15 April 2010 | Sparta Prague | 0–1 (0–2 agg.) | Slavia Prague | Prague |
| 20:00 CEST | | Report | J. Černý 8' (pen.) | Stadium: Generali Arena; Attendance: 10,577; Referee: Jiří Adam |

== Semi-finals ==
The first legs of the semi-finals were played on 21 April 2010, and the second legs were played on 28 April 2010.

| Team 1 | Agg. | Team 2 | 1st leg | 2nd leg |
|---|---|---|---|---|
| Jablonec | (a) 2–2 | Slavia Prague | 1–0 | 1–2 |
| Viktoria Plzeň | 5–3 | Sigma Olomouc | 2–2 | 3–1 |

=== First leg ===
| 21 April 2010 | Jablonec | 1–0 | Slavia Prague | Jablonec nad Nisou |
| 17:00 CEST | Jarolím 90' (pen.) | Report | | Stadium: Stadion Střelnice; Attendance: 2,485; Referee: Drahoslav Drábek |

| 21 April 2010 | Viktoria Plzeň | 2–2 | Sigma Olomouc | Plzeň |
| 18:30 CEST | Horváth 29'; Kolář 38' | Report | Ordoš 38'; Janotka 66' (pen.) | Stadium: Štruncovy Sady Stadion; Attendance: 2,063; Referee: Roman Hrubeš |

=== Second leg ===
| 28 April 2010 | Sigma Olomouc | 1–3 (3–5 agg.) | Viktoria Plzeň | Olomouc |
| 17:30 CEST | Navrátil 80' | Report | Rezek 19' (pen.); Střihavka 23'; Petržela 49' | Stadium: Andrův stadion Attendance: 3,255; Referee: Radek Matějek |

| 28 April 2010 | Slavia Prague | 2–1 (2–2(a) agg.) | Jablonec | Prague |
| 19:15 CEST | J. Černý 57'; Trapp 88' | Report | Lafata 38' | Stadium: Synot Tip Arena; Attendance: 3,573; Referee: Robert Hajek |

== Final ==
18 May 2010
20:15 CET

| Jablonec | 1–2 | Viktoria Plzeň |
|---|---|---|
| Lafata 60' | Report | 2' Petržela; 68' Bystroň |

Generali Arena, Prague
Attendance: 8,233
Referee: Jan Jílek

JABLONEC:
| GK | 1 | (Czech Republic) Michal Špit |
| RB | 5 | (Czech Republic) Petr Zábojník | Yellow card |
| CB | 24 | (Czech Republic) Petr Pavlík (c) | Yellow card |
| CB | 25 | (Czech Republic) Pavel Drsek |
| LB | 10 | (Czech Republic) Tomáš Jablonský |
| RM | 22 | (Czech Republic) Marek Jarolím |
| CM | 13 | (Czech Republic) Pavel Eliáš | Yellow card | (substituted off) 76' |
| CM | 15 | (Czech Republic) Luboš Loučka |
| LM | 16 | (Czech Republic) Jan Kovařík |
| CF | 11 | (Czech Republic) Tomáš Pekhart |
| CF | 21 | (Czech Republic) David Lafata | Yellow card |
Substitutes:
| FW | 17 | (Czech Republic) Jan Vošahlík | | (substituted on) 76' |
Manager:
(Czech Republic) František Komňacký

VIKTORIA PLZEŇ:
| GK | 25 | (Czech Republic) Michal Daněk |
| RB | 27 | (Czech Republic) František Rajtoral |
| CB | 21 | (Czech Republic) Jakub Navrátil |
| CB | 18 | (Czech Republic) David Bystroň |
| LB | 8 | (Czech Republic) David Limberský | Yellow card |
| DM | 4 | (Czech Republic) Tomáš Rada | Yellow card |
| CM | 26 | (Czech Republic) Daniel Kolář | Yellow card | (substituted off) 90' |
| CM | 10 | (Czech Republic) Pavel Horváth (c) |
| RW | 11 | (Czech Republic) Milan Petržela | | (substituted off) 89' |
| LW | 17 | (Czech Republic) Jan Rezek |
| CF | 7 | (Czech Republic) David Střihavka | | (substituted off) 83' |
Substitutes:
| FW | 23 | (Slovakia) Marek Bakoš | | (substituted on) 83' |
| MF | 24 | (Czech Republic) Filip Rýdel | | (substituted on) 89' |
| DF | 15 | (Czech Republic) František Ševínský | | (substituted on) 90' |
Manager:
(Czech Republic) Pavel Vrba

MATCH OFFICIALS

- Assistant referees:
  - Filípek
  - Mencl

MATCH RULES

- 90 minutes.
- Penalty shoot-out if scores level.
- Maximum of three substitutions.

== See also ==
- 2009–10 Czech First League
- 2009–10 Czech 2. Liga
