= Tomáš Kalas =

Czech footballer (born 1993)

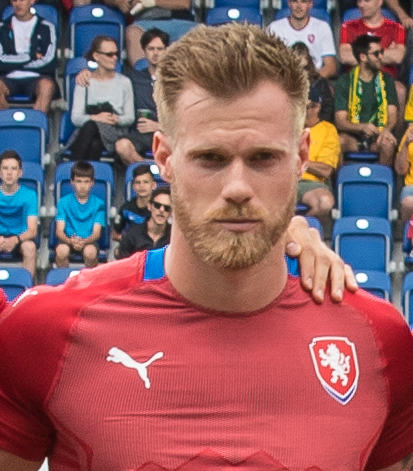
- Kalas lining up for Czech Republic in 2018

Personal information
- Full name: Tomáš Kalas
- Date of birth: 15 May 1993 (age 33)
- Place of birth: Olomouc, Czech Republic
- Height: 1.83 m (6 ft 0 in)
- Positions: Centre-back; right-back

Team information
- Current team: Schalke 04 II

Youth career
- 2000–2009: Sigma Olomouc

Senior career*
Years	Team	Apps	(Gls)
2009–2010	Sigma Olomouc	1	(0)
2010–2019	Chelsea	2	(0)
2010–2011	→ Sigma Olomouc (loan)	4	(0)
2011–2013	→ Vitesse (loan)	63	(1)
2014–2015	→ 1. FC Köln (loan)	0	(0)
2014–2015	→ 1. FC Köln II (loan)	2	(0)
2015–2016	→ Middlesbrough (loan)	43	(0)
2016–2018	→ Fulham (loan)	69	(1)
2018–2019	→ Bristol City (loan)	38	(0)
2019–2023	Bristol City	106	(1)
2023–	Schalke 04	48	(2)

International career
2009–2010	Czech Republic U17	12	(1)
2010	Czech Republic U18	5	(0)
2011	Czech Republic U19	8	(1)
2013	Czech Republic U20	3	(1)
2011–2015	Czech Republic U21	23	(0)
2012–2021	Czech Republic	31	(2)
- * Club domestic league appearances and goals as of 5 July 2026

Tomáš Kalas (born 15 May 1993) is a Czech professional footballer who plays for Schalke 04 II and the Czech Republic national team. He plays as a centre-back, but has also been played as a right-back.

Having begun his career at Sigma Olomouc, Kalas signed for Chelsea for a reported £5.2 million in 2010. He spent most of his tenure out on loan, first back at Sigma, then at Vitesse Arnhem, 1. FC Köln, Middlesbrough, Fulham and Bristol City. He transferred to Bristol City fully in 2019.

Kalas earned 42 caps and scored once for the Czech youth international teams, and made his senior international debut in 2012. He was included in the Czech Republic squad for UEFA Euro 2020.

== Club career ==
=== Chelsea ===
==== Early career ====
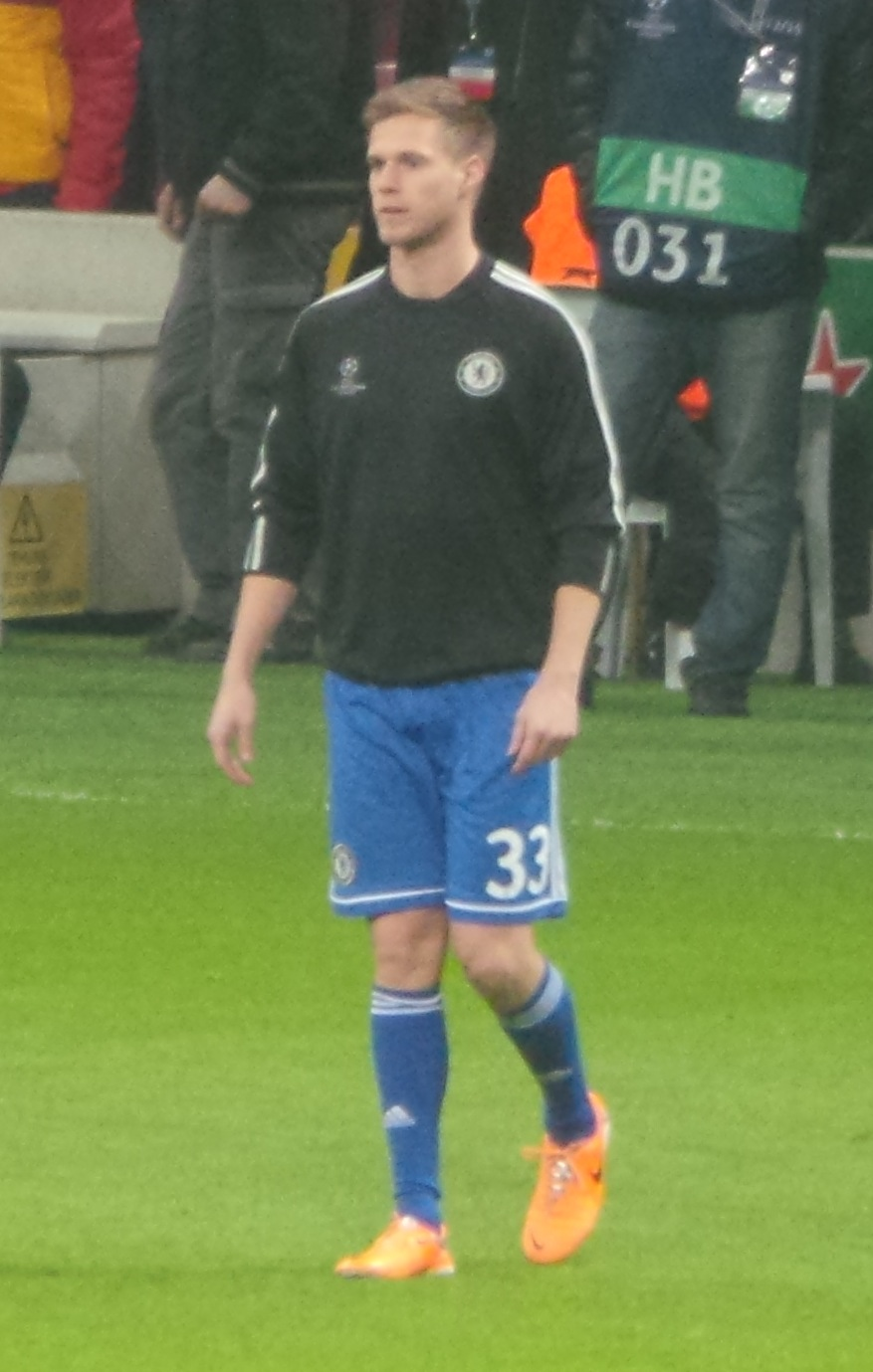
Kalas warming up for Chelsea in 2014

Born in Olomouc, Kalas started his career in his hometown with Sigma Olomouc, making his debut in a 2–0 victory over Slovan Liberec on 5 May 2010. He then signed for Premier League champions Chelsea, on 7 July 2010, for a reported figure of around £5.2 million, although it was agreed that he would stay at Sigma Olomouc for the 2010–11 season. Kalas arrived at Chelsea for the second half of the 2010–11 season and made his Chelsea reserve team debut in a 2–2 away draw to Aston Villa on 21 February.

==== Loans to Vitesse ====
On 22 August 2011 Kalas joined Dutch football club Vitesse Arnhem on loan for the 2011–12 season. He was given the number 2 jersey. He made his debut for Vitesse on 17 September 2011 against Roda JC Kerkrade which ended in a 5–0 win for Vitesse.

In March 2012, Kalas admitted that he did not yet know where he will be playing next season, but was happy on loan at Vitesse. "Ideally, I'll stay another year at this club." he told. "Simply put, there are three options. I'll stay here, go back to Chelsea or they will loan me to another club abroad. In late March I will talk with my managers about next season and know more."

On 17 May 2012, Kalas scored the opening goal in the 22nd minute, for Vitesse against RKC Waalwijk; the match ended in a 3–1 win for Vitesse. This goal was Kalas' first goal of his professional career.

On 11 July 2012, Kalas rejoined Vitesse on another loan until the end of the 2012–13 season. He also extended his contract with Chelsea until the summer of 2017. Kalas scored his first Eredivisie goal of the season for Vitesse in a 3–0 defeat of FC Groningen on 16 September 2012.

==== 2013–14 season ====
On 10 July 2013 Chelsea manager José Mourinho confirmed Kalas would stay and fight for his place at Chelsea for the coming season. During Chelsea's 2013 pre-season Asia tour, Kalas made 3 appearances for Chelsea, in wins against the Singha All Stars, the Malaysian XI, and the Indonesian XI. During pre-season training, Kalas suffered fractured fibula, cutting his action with the first-team short as the rest of the team flew over to America for the Guinness International Champions Cup.

After finally recovered from his injuries, Kalas made his competitive debut for the senior squad on 29 October 2013 as a substitute for Juan Mata, in a 2–0 win at Arsenal in the League Cup. Speaking of his role at Chelsea, Kalas said in an interview with a Czech talk show: "I am a player for training sessions. If they need a cone they put me there."

On 18 March 2014, Kalas made his Champions League debut against Galatasaray, replacing Willian in stoppage time; Chelsea won 2–0.

On 27 April 2014, Kalas made his Premier League debut for Chelsea, at Anfield against Liverpool, being named in the starting lineup in a 2–0 win.

==== Loan to FC Köln ====
On 11 June 2014, 1. FC Köln announced that Kalas would spend the 2014–15 season on loan at their club. On 24 September, Kalas made his debut for Köln II, FC Köln's reserve team, against Borussia Mönchengladbach II; the game ended in a 2–1 win for Köln II. In November that year, Kalas had yet to feature for Köln's first team and said in an interview "At first, they were happy with my performances but then I didn't play in any game [sic]. I don't know what went wrong." With the lack of playing time, Kalas was linked to a move to clubs in multiple countries, including his former team Vitesse, ahead of the January 2015 transfer window.

==== Loans to Middlesbrough ====
On 9 January 2015, Middlesbrough announced that Kalas would spend the remainder of the 2014–15 season on loan at the Championship club. The day after signing with the Boro, Kalas made his debut for Middlesbrough in a 0–0 draw against Reading. Manager Aitor Karanka praised Kalas' aptitude to the right-back position, where Middlesbrough had been challenged following a long-term injury to Damià Abella in September 2014.

Kalas retained his position as the right-back against Huddersfield Town and Cardiff City. During the game against Cardiff City on 20 January 2015, Kalas suffered a high ankle sprain. On 10 February 2015, Kalas returned to the starting line-up in a 2–1 away win against Blackpool. On 14 April 2015, Kalas provided an assist to fellow Chelsea loanee Patrick Bamford as Middlesbrough beat Wolves 2–1 at home.

Due to regulations of a short-term loan, Kalas was unable to finish out his season playing for the Boro. Although he missed the final three games of the season, he did ask permission to stay with Middlesbrough and train with the team until the season finished. Kalas played a big role in the Boro making it to the play-offs, although they were unable to beat Norwich City in the final to achieve promotion to the Premier League.

On 13 July 2015, Kalas moved on to Middlesbrough for a second time until the end of the 2015–16 season. The same year on 23 July, he signed a new three-year contract at Chelsea, therefore keeping him at the club until 2018. On 9 August 2015, Kalas started against Preston North End in the opening game of the season, where he retained his spot as right-back from the previous season. During the first half of the season, Kalas was the starting right-back, but was dropped later on for the in-form Emilio Nsue. Even though he was playing a lot less, Middlesbrough manager Aitor Karanka stated that Kalas was still important in their chase for promote to the Premier League. On 19 April 2016, Kalas played his last game for the Boro coming on as a late substitute as the Boro held out for the draw against league leaders Burnley.

Although there were talks about Kalas returning to Middlesbrough for a third spell, nothing materialised while Kalas received interest from other teams.

==== Loan to Fulham ====
On 13 July 2016, Kalas joined Fulham on a season-long loan, with this being his fifth loan.

On 5 August 2016, Kalas made his debut in a 1–0 home victory over Newcastle United. Kalas made an injury-time block to deny Matt Ritchie's goal-bound shot, as he helped Fulham hold out for the clean-sheet. Kalas missed his first league game on 24 September 2016 after picking up a hamstring injury. On 29 October 2016, Kalas returned from his injury and went on to score his first goal for Fulham in a 5–0 win over Huddersfield Town. Fulham qualified for the playoffs but lost 2–1 on aggregate in the semi-finals to Reading, with Kalas conceding the winning penalty by committing handball.

On 27 July 2017, Kalas signed a new four-year contract with Chelsea and rejoined Fulham on loan for a second season. He was sent off after 39 seconds on 12 August in a 1–1 draw at Reading for a foul on Mo Barrow. Returning to Craven Cottage for a second season, a playoff final win over Aston Villa saw him achieve his second promotion in three seasons.

=== Bristol City ===
On 23 August 2018, still in the Championship, Kalas joined Bristol City on a season long-loan along with fellow Chelsea loanee Jay Dasilva.

On 1 July 2019, following his successful loan spell, Bristol City confirmed the permanent signing of Kalas for a club-record fee in the region of £8 million. He signed a four-year contract until 2023. He scored his first goal for Bristol City in a 2–1 win against Coventry City on 12 September 2020.

=== Schalke 04 ===
On 26 August 2023, Kalas signed a two-year contract with German 2. Bundesliga club FC Schalke 04.

== International career ==
=== Youth ===
Kalas made his debut for the U-17 on 5 September 2009 coming on as a 61st-minute substitute in a European Under-17 Championship Qualifying match against Belarus which the Czechs won 1–0. He went on to be picked for the final tournament. He played 65 minutes of his 9th appearance, against Greece, before being sent off.

=== Senior ===
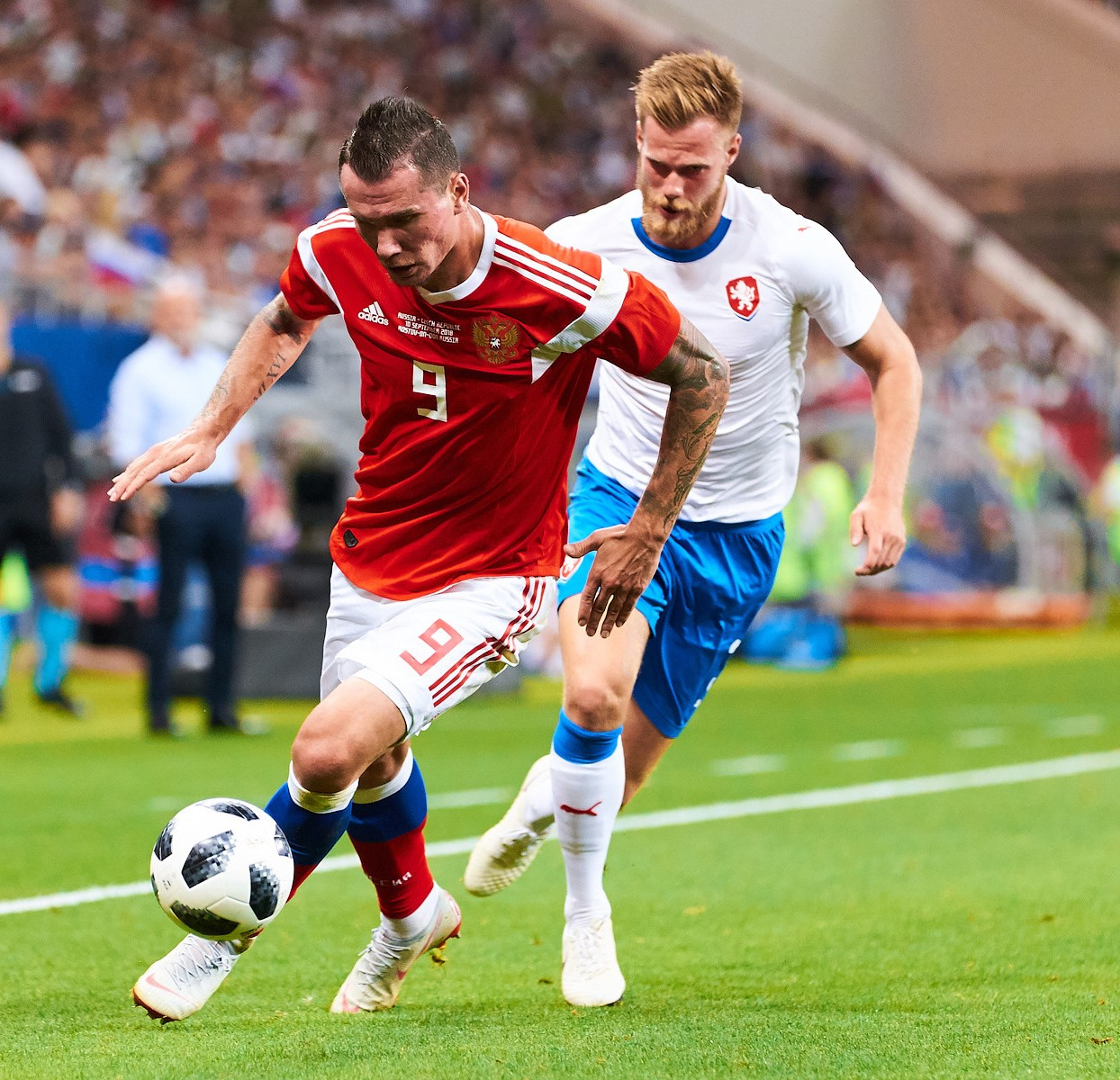
Kalas (right) playing for the Czech Republic in 2018

Kalas debuted for the Czech senior squad in a 3–0 friendly victory against Slovakia at his hometown's Andrův stadion on 14 November 2012, coming on as a substitute for David Limberský in the 74th minute. Kalas was included in the squad during the Euro 2016 qualifiers. On 13 October 2015, he came off the bench replacing Josef Šural, resulting in a 3–2 victory for the Czech Republic.

== Career statistics ==
=== Club ===
As of 5 July 2026

Appearances and goals by club, season and competition
Club	Season	League			National cup (Note: Includes Czech Cup, FA Cup, KNVB Cup, DFB-Pokal)		League cup (Note: Includes Football League Cup/EFL Cup)		Europe		Other		Total	
Club	Season	Division	Apps	Goals	Apps	Goals	Apps	Goals	Apps	Goals	Apps	Goals	Apps	Goals
Sigma Olomouc	2009–10	Czech First League	1	0	0	0	—		—		—		1	0
Chelsea	2010–11	Premier League	0	0	0	0	0	0	0	0	—		0	0
Chelsea	2013–14	Premier League	2	0	0	0	1	0	1 (Note: Appearance in UEFA Champions League)	0	—		4	0
Chelsea	Total		2	0	0	0	1	0	1	0	—		4	0
Sigma Olomouc (loan)	2010–11	Czech First League	4	0	2	0	—		—		—		6	0
Vitesse (loan)	2011–12	Eredivisie	29	0	4	0	—		—		4 (Note: Appearances in Eredivisie European play-offs)	1	37	1
Vitesse (loan)	2012–13	Eredivisie	34	1	3	0	—		3 (Note: Appearances in UEFA Europa League)	0	—		40	1
Vitesse (loan)	Total		63	1	7	0	—		3	0	4	1	77	2
1. FC Köln (loan)	2014–15	Bundesliga	0	0	0	0	—		—		—		0	0
1. FC Köln II (loan)	2014–15	Regionalliga West	2	0	—		—		—		—		2	0
Middlesbrough (loan)	2014–15	Championship	17	0	0	0	0	0	—		—		17	0
Middlesbrough (loan)	2015–16	Championship	26	0	1	0	3	0	—		—		30	0
Middlesbrough (loan)	Total		43	0	1	0	3	0	—		—		47	0
Fulham (loan)	2016–17	Championship	36	1	2	0	0	0	—		2 (Note: Appearances in Championship play-offs)	0	40	1
Fulham (loan)	2017–18	Championship	33	0	1	0	0	0	—		2	0	36	0
Fulham (loan)	Total		69	1	3	0	0	0	—		4	0	76	1
Bristol City (loan)	2018–19	Championship	38	0	3	0	0	0	—		—		41	0
Bristol City	2019–20	Championship	23	0	1	0	0	0	—		—		24	0
Bristol City	2020–21	Championship	40	1	3	0	1	0	—		—		44	1
Bristol City	2021–22	Championship	35	0	1	0	1	0	—		—		37	0
Bristol City	2022–23	Championship	8	0	1	0	0	0	—		—		9	0
Bristol City	Total		144	1	9	0	2	0	—		—		155	1
Schalke 04	2023–24	2. Bundesliga	25	1	1	0	—		—		—		26	1
Schalke 04	2024–25	2. Bundesliga	23	1	1	0	—		—		—		24	1
Schalke 04	2025–26	2. Bundesliga	0	0	0	0	—		—		—		0	0
Schalke 04	Total		48	2	2	0	—		—		—		50	2
Career total			376	5	24	0	6	0	4	0	8	1	418	6

=== International ===
Appearances and goals by national team and year
National team	Year	Apps	Goals
Czech Republic	2012	1	0
Czech Republic	2015	2	0
Czech Republic	2016	2	0
Czech Republic	2017	6	0
Czech Republic	2018	7	2
Czech Republic	2019	1	0
Czech Republic	2020	3	0
Czech Republic	2021	9	0
Total		31	2

Scores and results list Czech Republic's goal tally first, score column indicates score after each Kalas goal.

List of international goals scored by Tomáš Kalas
No.	Date	Venue	Opponent	Score	Result	Competition
1	26 March 2018	Guangxi Sports Center, Nanning, China	China	1–1	4–1	2018 China Cup
2	6 June 2018	Rudolf-Tonn-Stadion, Schwechat, Austria	Nigeria	1–0	1–0	Friendly

== Honours ==
Chelsea Youth

- Premier Reserve League: 2010–11
- Professional U21 Development League: 2013–14

Middlesbrough

- Football League Championship runner-up: 2015–16

Fulham

- EFL Championship play-offs: 2018

Czech Republic U19

- UEFA European Under-19 Championship runner-up: 2011
