= Obermajer =

Obermajer is a surname, a Czech form of the German surname Obermaier. Notable people with the surname include:

- Miroslav Obermajer (born 1973), Czech footballer
- Tomáš Obermajer (born 1960), Czech footballer
