= Roman Hubník =

Czech footballer

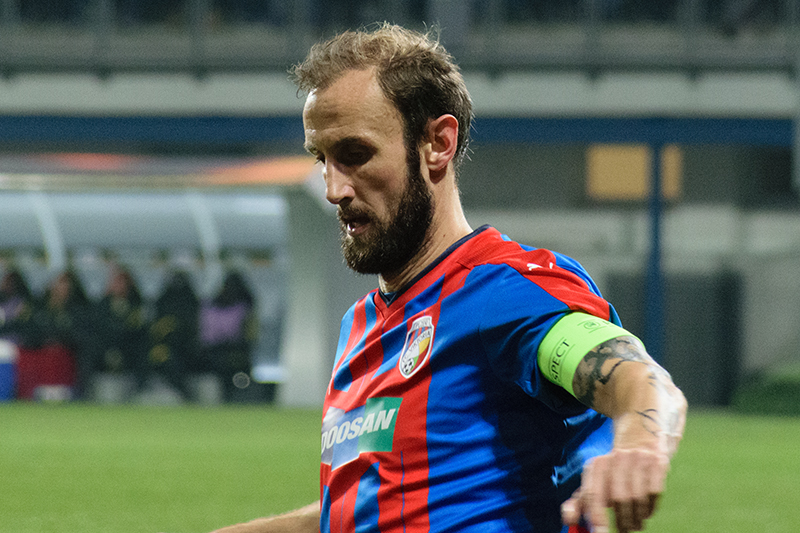

Personal information
- Date of birth: 6 June 1984 (age 42)
- Place of birth: Vsetín, Czechoslovakia
- Height: 1.92 m (6 ft 4 in)
- Position: Centre-back

Youth career
- 1990–1996: TJ Tatran Halenkov
- 1996–1997: FC Vsetín
- 1997–1998: Tescoma Zlín
- 1998–2002: Sigma Olomouc

Senior career*
Years	Team	Apps	(Gls)
2002–2007	Sigma Olomouc	102	(4)
2007–2010	Moscow	9	(0)
2009	→ Sparta Prague (loan)	29	(5)
2010	→ Hertha BSC (loan)	7	(0)
2010–2013	Hertha BSC	74	(7)
2013–2020	Viktoria Plzeň	123	(3)
2015	→ Sigma Olomouc (loan)	7	(0)
2020–2022	Sigma Olomouc	44	(0)
Total		395	(19)

International career
1999–2000	Czech Republic U15	5	(0)
2000–2001	Czech Republic U16	12	(3)
2001	Czech Republic U17	3	(0)
2001	Czech Republic U18	3	(0)
2001–2003	Czech Republic U19	16	(0)
2002–2003	Czech Republic U20	7	(1)
2004–2007	Czech Republic U21	23	(1)
2009–2020	Czech Republic	30	(3)
- * Club domestic league appearances and goals

Roman Hubník (Czech pronunciation: [ˈroman ˈɦubɲiːk]; born 6 June 1984) is a Czech former professional footballer who played as a centre-back. His career was connected especially with Sigma Olomouc, Viktoria Plzeň and Hertha BSC. Until 2016, he also played for the Czech national team. His brother Michal Hubník is also a footballer.

== Club career ==
In January 2007, FC Moscow signed Hubník from SK Sigma Olomouc for a €2 million transfer fee. In January 2009 he was loaned out until 31 December 2009 to Sparta Prague. After his return to Russia, he again moved on loan, this time to Hertha BSC. On 20 May 2010, Hertha made use of a contract option and signed Hubník permanently. In September 2013, he signed a deal with Viktoria Plzeň.

== International career ==
Hubník played for all Czech national youth teams. On 5 July 2009, Hubník made his debut for the Czech Republic national team in the match against Malta. His first international goal came on 12 August 2009, in the 3–1 victory over Belgium. At the European championship in 2016 in France, Hubník played in all three group-stage matches for the Czech national team. With only one point from the three games, the team did not qualify for the knockout stages.

== Career statistics ==
Appearances and goals by national team and year
National team	Year	Apps	Goals
Czech Republic	2009	6	1
Czech Republic	2010	5	1
Czech Republic	2011	9	0
Czech Republic	2012	4	0
Czech Republic	2016	5	1
Czech Republic	2020	1	0
Total		30	3

International goals by date, venue, cap, opponent, score, result and competition
No.	Date	Venue	Cap	Opponent	Score	Result	Competition
1	12 August 2009	Na Stínadlech, Teplice, Czech Republic	2	Belgium	1–1	3–1	Friendly
2	8 October 2010	Eden Arena, Prague, Czech Republic	10	Scotland	1–0	1–0	UEFA Euro 2012 qualifying
3	27 May 2016	Kufstein Arena, Kufstein, Austria	25	Malta	3–0	6–0	Friendly

== Honours ==
=== Club ===
SK Sigma Olomouc

- Czech First League 3rd Place: 2003-04

AC Sparta Praha

- Czech First League: 2009-2010
- Czech First League 2nd place: 2008-09

Hertha BSC 2. Bundesliga: 2010-11, 2012-13

FC Viktoria Plzeň

- Czech First League: 2014-15, 2015-16, 2017-18
- Czech First League 2nd place: 2013-14, 2016-17, 2018-19, 2019-20
- Czech Cup runner-up: 2013-14
- Czech Supercup: 2015
- Czech Supercup runner-up: 2013, 2014

=== International ===
Czech Republic national under-19 football team UEFA European Under-19 Championship: 3rd place 2003

=== Individual ===
- Czech First League Defender of the Season: 2015-16, 2016-17
- Czech First League Player of the Month: April 2015-16, March 2016-2017
- Czech First League Member of the Club of the Legends
