= Daniel Rossi (footballer) =

Brazilian footballer (born 1981)

Daniel Rossi Silva
Personal information
- Full name: Daniel Rossi Silva
- Date of birth: 4 January 1981 (age 45)
- Place of birth: Rio Claro, São Paulo, Brazil
- Height: 1.85 m (6 ft 1 in)
- Positions: Defensive midfielder; fullback

Senior career*
Years	Team	Apps	(Gls)
1996–2000	São Paulo	-	(-)
2000	Kawasaki Frontale	8	(1)
2003	Avaí	-	(-)
2004–2006	São Paulo	7	(1)
2007	Rio Claro	-	(-)
2007–2012	Sigma Olomouc	133	(8)
2013–2016	Jablonec	72	(3)
- * Club domestic league appearances and goals as of 30 January 2019

Daniel Rossi Silva (born 4 January 1981), commonly known as just Daniel Rossi, is a Brazilian former football midfielder.

== Club statistics ==
Club performance			League		Cup		League Cup		Total	
Season	Club	League	Apps	Goals	Apps	Goals	Apps	Goals	Apps	Goals
Japan			League		Emperor's Cup		J.League Cup		Total	
2000	Kawasaki Frontale	J1 League	8	1	0	0	5	0	13	1
Total			8	1	0	0	5	0	13	1

== Honours ==
SK Sigma Olomouc

- Czech Supercup: 2012
