= Riegel (surname) =

Riegel is a German surname. Notable people with the surname include:

- Anton Pius Riegel (1789–?), Austrian architect
- Bill Reigel (1932-1993) American basketball player and coach
- E.C. Riegel (1879–1953), independent scholar, author and consumer advocate
- Eden Riegel (born 1981), American actress
- Ella Riegel (1867 - 1937), American suffragist
- Franz Riegel (1843–1904), German internist and gastroenterologist
- Hans Riegel (1923–2013), German entrepreneur
- Hans Riegel Sr. (1893-1945), German entrepreneur
- Jan Riegel (born 1980), Czech footballer
- Jacob Riegel (born 2004), German racing driver
- Jeffrey K. Riegel (born 1945), American sinologist
- Peter Riegel (1935–2018), American research engineer who developed a formula for predicting an athlete's race times
- Sam Riegel (born 1976), American voice actor, writer and director
- Skee Riegel (1914–2009), American golfer
- Tatiana S. Riegel, American film editor

== See also ==
- Riegels (surname)
- Reuben Reigel's Covered Bridge
- Alois Riegl
