= Palička =

Palička (feminine: Paličková) is a Czech surname. Notable people with the surname include:

- Andreas Palicka (born 1986), Swedish handball player
- Vlastimil Palička (born 1954), Czech football manager
