= SK Protivanov =

Sokol Protivanov
- Full name: SK Protivanov, z.s.
- Founded: 1933
- League: Olomoucký kraj, 1.A třída, skupina A
- 2022–23: 13th
Home colours

SK Protivanov is a football club from the village of Protivanov in the Olomouc Region of the Czech Republic. Currently the club plays in the Okresní přebor – Prostějov (eighth level).

Protivanov played in the Czech Fourth Division during the 2009–10 season. In the 2009–10 Czech Cup, Protivanov enjoyed a run to the third round, beating first round opponents Boskovice on penalties before facing SK Uničov of the third level at home in round two. They advanced to the third round before losing to top flight side SK Sigma Olomouc. They also played in the Czech Cup on other occasions, but didn't manage to proceed further than the first round between 2006 and 2009.
