= Jan Schulmeister =

Czech footballer

Personal information
- Full name: Jan Schulmeister
- Date of birth: 11 March 1986 (age 40)
- Place of birth: Czechoslovakia
- Height: 1.82 m (5 ft 11 1/2 in)
- Position: Forward

Team information
- Current team: SK Sigma Olomouc
- Number: 11

Youth career
- 1992–2005: SK Sigma Olomouc

Senior career*
Years	Team	Apps	(Gls)
2005–	SK Sigma Olomouc	99	(10)
2008	Zenit Čáslav (loan)		
2008	FC Hradec Králové (loan)		
2008–2009	Fotbal Fulnek (loan)		

International career^{‡}
2001–2002	Czech Republic U16	7	(0)
2002–2003	Czech Republic U17	11	(3)
2003	Czech Republic U18	4	(1)
2003–2005	Czech Republic U19	20	(7)
2006	Czech Republic U21	2	(0)
- * Club domestic league appearances and goals as of 30 June 2013 ‡ National team caps and goals as of 12 June 2011

Jan Schulmeister (born 11 March 1986) is a Czech football forward who plays for Sigma Olomouc.

== Honours ==
SK Sigma Olomouc

- Czech Cup: 2011–12
- Czech Supercup: 2012
