= Marek Kaščák =

Slovak footballer

Personal information
- Full name: Marek Kaščák
- Date of birth: 22 May 1982 (age 44)
- Place of birth: Bardejov, Czechoslovakia
- Height: 1.80 m (5 ft 11 in)
- Position: Defensive midfielder

Team information
- Current team: 1. HFK Olomouc

Youth career
- Bardejov

Senior career*
| Years | Team | Apps | (Gls) |
| 1999–2002 | Bardejov | | |
| 2001 | → Banská Bystrica (loan) | | |
| 2002–2005 | 1. HFK Olomouc | 65 | (3) |
| 2003 | → Zábřeh (loan) | | |
| 2006–2010 | Sigma Olomouc | 95 | (0) |
| 2007 | → Trenčín (loan) | 14 | (2) |
| 2010–2013 | Spartak Trnava | 61 | (4) |
| 2013–2014 | Brno | 10 | (0) |
| 2015– | 1. HFK Olomouc | 0 | (0) |

International career
| 2011 | Slovakia | 1 | (0) |
- * Club domestic league appearances and goals as of 1 January 2015

Marek Kaščák (born 22 May 1982) is a Slovak footballer who plays for 1. HFK Olomouc. Besides Slovakia, he has played in the Czech Republic.

== International career ==
Kaščák made his national team debut in a 1–2 home defeat against Denmark on 29 March 2011.
