= Riegels =

Riegels is a German surname. Notable people with the surname include:

- Elna Riegels, birth name of the Danish painter Elna Fonnesbech-Sandberg (1892–1994)
- Michael Riegels (b. 1938), inaugural chairman of the Financial Services Commission of the British Virgin Islands
- Niels Ditlev Riegels (1755–1802), a Danish historian, journalist and author of critical pamphlets
- Roy Riegels (1908–1993), American football player

== See also ==
- Riegel (surname)
