= Martin Blaha (footballer) =

Czech football goalkeeper

Personal information
- Full name: Martin Blaha
- Date of birth: 8 August 1985 (age 41)
- Place of birth: Czechoslovakia
- Height: 1.98 m (6 ft 6 in)
- Position: Goalkeeper

Team information
- Current team: SK Sigma Olomouc
- Number: 19

Senior career*
Years	Team	Apps	(Gls)
2005–	SK Sigma Olomouc	12	(0)
2006	→ Blšany (loan)		
2007	→ Fulnek (loan)		
2011	→ Opava (loan)	16	(0)
- * Club domestic league appearances and goals as of 31 December 2011

Martin Blaha (born 8 August 1985) is a Czech football goalkeeper who plays for SK Sigma Olomouc.
