= Jakub Petr =

Czech football player (born 1990)

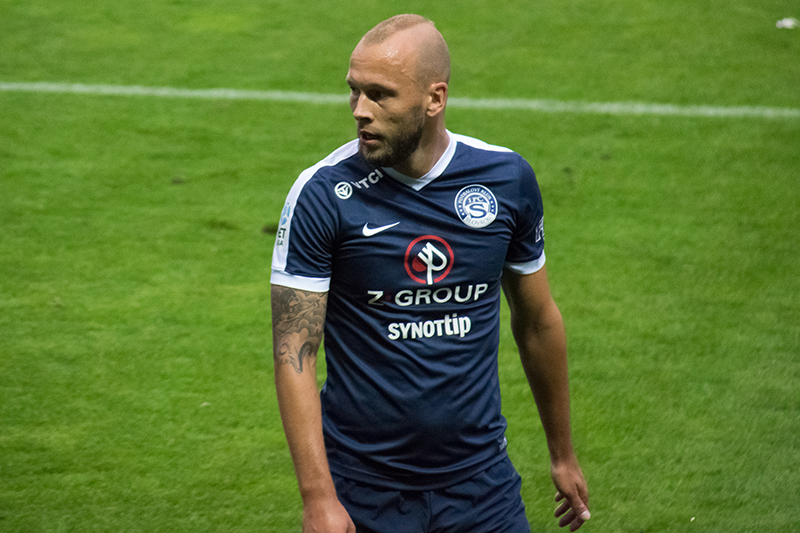

Personal information
- Date of birth: 10 April 1990 (age 36)
- Place of birth: Olomouc, Czechoslovakia
- Height: 1.83 m (6 ft 0 in)
- Position: Forward

Team information
- Current team: SC Wieselburg
- Number: 20

Senior career*
Years	Team	Apps	(Gls)
2006–2017	Sigma Olomouc	184	(24)
2013–2014	→ Slovácko (loan)	25	(3)
2014	→ Slavia Prague (loan)	7	(0)
2017–2019	Slovácko	34	(1)
2019	Vysočina Jihlava	12	(2)
2019–	SC Wieselburg	13	(0)

International career
2005–2006	Czech Republic U16	17	(6)
2006–2007	Czech Republic U17	12	(2)
2007	Czech Republic U18	1	(2)
2009	Czech Republic U19	6	(2)
2011	Czech Republic U21	1	(1)
- * Club domestic league appearances and goals as of 13:37, 20 November 2019 (UTC)

Jakub Petr (born 10 April 1990) is a Czech football player who plays for Austrian club SC Wieselburg.
