= Pavel Dreksa =

Czech footballer (born 1989)

Personal information
- Date of birth: 17 September 1989 (age 37)
- Place of birth: Prostějov, Czechoslovakia
- Height: 1.85 m (6 ft 1 in)
- Position: Centre back

Team information
- Current team: AEZ Zakakiou

Youth career
- 1996–2005: Prostějov
- 2005–2009: Sigma Olomouc

Senior career*
| Years | Team | Apps | (Gls) |
| 2009–2014 | Sigma Olomouc | 83 | (5) |
| 2011 | → Ústí nad Labem (loan) | 9 | (0) |
| 2011 | → Baník Ostrava (loan) | 3 | (0) |
| 2015 | Znojmo | 12 | (1) |
| 2015–2019 | MFK Karviná | 63 | (4) |
| 2017 | → Neftçi Baku (loan) | 15 | (0) |
| 2020–2021 | Zbrojovka Brno | 24 | (2) |
| 2021–2024 | Enosis Neon Paralimni | 58 | (2) |
| 2024– | AEZ Zakakiou | | |
- * Club domestic league appearances and goals as of 14 July 2024

Pavel Dreksa (born 17 September 1989) is a Czech football defender who plays for Cypriot club AEZ Zakakiou. He made his first team debut for Sigma Olomouc in 2009. In 2017 he left the Czech Republic on loan to Neftçi PFK in Azerbaijan. His father-in-law is former Czech defender Petr Maléř.

He also played for Czech youth national teams.

== Honours ==
SK Sigma Olomouc

- Czech Cup: 2011–12
