= Lukáš Bajer =

Czech footballer (born 1984)

- Bajer playing for Heracles Almelo in 2009

Personal information
- Date of birth: 15 December 1984 (age 41)
- Place of birth: Přerov, Czechoslovakia
- Height: 1.77 m (5 ft 10 in)
- Position: Midfielder

Team information
- Current team: Keravnos Iriwn

Youth career
- 1990–2004: SK Sigma Olomouc

Senior career*
Years	Team	Apps	(Gls)
2004–2005	Atlantic Slovan Pardubice	26	(0)
2005	Znojmo		
2006	Hanácká Slavia Kroměříž	13	(0)
2006–2007	Dosta Bystrc-Kníničky	26	(2)
2007–2012	Sigma Olomouc	96	(5)
2008	→ Heracles Almelo (loan)	11	(0)
2012	Aktobe	24	(5)
2013	Viktoria Žižkov	2	(1)
2013	Milsami	3	(0)
2014	Kingston	1	(2)
2016–2017	Koronis Koiladas	25	(18)
2017	Doxa Virona	0	(0)
2018	Koronis Koiladas	15	(3)
2018–2019	Aristionas Lygouriou	20	(8)
- * Club domestic league appearances and goals

Lukáš Bajer (born 15 December 1984) is a Czech former professional football midfielder who played in the Czech National Football League, Czech First League, Eredivisie, Kazakhstan Premier League, Moldovan National Division, Canadian Soccer League and Greek Amateur Division

== Playing career ==
Bajer began his career in 2004, with Atlantic Slovan Pardubice in the Czech National Football League. He had stints in with 1. SC Znojmo, SK Hanácká Slavia Kroměříž, Dosta Bystrc. In 2007, he signed with SK Sigma Olomouc of the Czech First League featuring in 96 matches, and recorded five goals. In 2008, he was loaned to the Eredivisie to play for Heracles Almelo. In 2012, he went abroad to Asia to play with FC Aktobe, and returned to Czech Republic to play for FK Viktoria Žižkov. In 2013, he signed with FC Milsami Orhei of the Moldovan National Division. On 29 August 2014, Bajer signed a contract with Kingston FC of the Canadian Soccer League. In July 2016 Bajer signed contract with Koronis Koiladas of the Greek Amateur Division and scored 18 goals in 25 appearances. After his impressive season, he signed with Doxa Virona also a team that played in the Greek Amateur Division. He didn't make an appearance there so he moved back to Koronis Koiladas in January. He didn't impress scoring only 3 goals in 15 matches so Koronis Koiladas didn't renew his contract. After some days him being a free agent he signed with Aristionas Lygouriou a team that is in the Greek Amateur Division.
