= Tomáš Lovásik =

Slovak footballer

Personal information
- Date of birth: 31 July 1974 (age 52)
- Place of birth: Czechoslovakia
- Height: 1.91 m (6 ft 3 in)
- Position: Goalkeeper

Senior career*
Years	Team	Apps	(Gls)
1992–1993	Spartak Trnava		
1994	Dukla Trenčín		
1995	Tauris Rimavská Sobota		
1996–1997	Spartak Trnava		
1998–1999	SC Weismain		
2000	FC Svit Zlín		
2000–2005	FK Jablonec	77	(0)
2005–2011	SK Sigma Olomouc	58	(0)
- * Club domestic league appearances and goals as of 17 May 2010

Tomáš Lovásik (born 31 July 1974) is a Slovak former football goalkeeper. He spent most of his career at Czech football clubs, FK Jablonec and SK Sigma Olomouc, playing over 100 matches in the Gambrinus liga.
