= Jakub Heidenreich =

Czech footballer (born 1989)

Personal information
- Full name: Jakub Heidenreich
- Date of birth: 27 April 1989 (age 37)
- Place of birth: Mohelnice, Czechoslovakia
- Height: 1.88 m (6 ft 2 in)
- Position: Left-back

Youth career
- 1995–1998: FK Mohelnice-Moravičany
- 1998–2007: Sigma Olomouc

Senior career*
Years	Team	Apps	(Gls)
2008–	Sigma Olomouc	41	(1)
2009–2010	→ Bohemians (Střížkov) (loan)	6	(0)
2010	→ Viktoria Žižkov (loan)	1	(0)
2011–2012	→ Tatran Prešov (loan)	15	(0)
2012–2013	Sulko Zábřeh		(0)
2013–2015	SV Eichede	44	(1)

International career
2004–2005	Czech Republic U-16	6	(1)
2005–2006	Czech Republic U-17	19	(1)
2006–2007	Czech Republic U-18	7	(0)
2007–2008	Czech Republic U-19	10	(1)
2009	Czech Republic U-20	2	(0)
2008–2009	Czech Republic U-21	2	(0)
- * Club domestic league appearances and goals

Jakub Heidenreich (born 27 April 1989) is a Czech former professional footballer who played as a left-back. He represented his country at all age groups from U-16 up to U-21.
