= Aleš Škerle =

Czech footballer (born 1982)

Personal information
- Date of birth: 14 June 1982 (age 44)
- Place of birth: Třebíč, Czechoslovakia
- Height: 1.88 m (6 ft 2 in)
- Position: Centre back

Team information
- Current team: Sigma Olomouc (team leader)

Youth career
- 1989–2000: BOPO Třebíč
- 2000–2004: SK Sigma Olomouc

Senior career*
Years	Team	Apps	(Gls)
2004–2017	Sigma Olomouc	216	(2)
2005–2006	→ FK SIAD Most (loan)	29	(0)
2015–2016	→ Bohemians 1905 (loan)	26	(1)
Total		271	(3)

Managerial career
- 2018–: Sigma Olomouc (team leader)
- * Club domestic league appearances and goals

Aleš Škerle (born 14 June 1982) is a retired Czech football player. He is currently working as a team leader for SK Sigma Olomouc.

== Honours ==
SK Sigma Olomouc

- Czech Cup: 2011–12
- Czech Supercup: 2012
