= Rudolf Otepka =

Czech soccer player

Personal information
- Date of birth: 13 November 1973 (age 52)
- Place of birth: Želechovice, Czechoslovakia
- Height: 1.74 m (5 ft 8 1/2 in)
- Position: Midfielder

Team information
- Current team: Dynamo České Budějovice

Senior career*
Years	Team	Apps	(Gls)
1995–1996	Svit Zlín	14	(1)
1997–1998	Dukla Prague	29	(10)
1998–1999	Petra Drnovice	40	(3)
2000–2007	Marila Příbram	189	(35)
2007–2009	Baník Ostrava	49	(6)
2009–2010	Sigma Olomouc	12	(0)
2010	→ Dynamo České Budějovice	57	(9)
- * Club domestic league appearances and goals as of 31 December 2011

Rudolf Otepka (born 13 November 1973 is a Czech football player who plays as a midlefielder for Czech club Dynamo České Budějovice.

In October 2011, Otepka became the 11th player to play 400 matches in the Czech, and previously Czechoslovak top flight.
