= Tomáš Nuc =

Czech footballer (born 1989)

Personal information
- Date of birth: 9 March 1989 (age 37)
- Place of birth: Czechoslovakia
- Height: 1.74 m (5 ft 9 in)
- Position: Defender

Youth career
- SK Sigma Olomouc

Senior career*
Years	Team	Apps	(Gls)
2008–2010	SK Sigma Olomouc	18	(0)
2010	FC Hlučín (loan)	11	(0)

International career
2009	Czech Republic U21	1	(0)
- * Club domestic league appearances and goals

Tomáš Nuc (born 9 March 1989) is a Czech former football player who played in the Czech First League for SK Sigma Olomouc. He represented his country internationally at the under-21 level.
