= Ondřej Murín =

Czech footballer (born 1991)

Personal information
- Full name: Ondřej Murín
- Date of birth: 15 February 1991 (age 35)
- Place of birth: Czechoslovakia
- Height: 1.85 m (6 ft 1 in)
- Position: Defender

Team information
- Current team: 1. HFK Olomouc
- Number: 18

Senior career*
Years	Team	Apps	(Gls)
2009–2012	Sigma Olomouc	5	(1)
2012	→ Nitra (loan)	9	(1)
2012–2013	→ 1. HFK Olomouc (loan)	19	(4)
2015	1. HFK Olomouc		
2016–2017	Slovan Moravská Třebová		
2017–2018	Fulnek		
- * Club domestic league appearances and goals as of 9 May 2013

Ondřej Murín (born 15 February 1991) is a former Czech football defender . Murin made his debut in the game against FK Bohemians Praha in the 2009–2010 season.
