= Milan Machalický =

Czech footballer (born 1991)

Personal information
- Full name: Milan Machalický
- Date of birth: 1 June 1991 (age 35)
- Place of birth: Czech Republic
- Height: 1.77 m (5 ft 9 1/2 in)
- Position: Defender

Senior career*
Years	Team	Apps	(Gls)
2008–2012	SK Sigma Olomouc	12	(0)
- * Club domestic league appearances and goals as of 20:31, 18 April 2013 (UTC)

Milan Machalický (born 1 June 1991) is a Czech football defender who played for Sigma Olomouc.
