= Michal Hubník =

Czech footballer and coach

Personal information
- Full name: Michal Hubník
- Date of birth: 1 June 1983 (age 43)
- Place of birth: Halenkov, Czechoslovakia
- Height: 1.83 m (6 ft 0 in)
- Position: Striker

Youth career
- Tatran Halenkov
- FC Vsetín
- Tatran Halenkov
- Drnovice
- Sigma Olomouc

Senior career*
Years	Team	Apps	(Gls)
2000–2013	Sigma Olomouc	161	(35)
2004–2005	→ SFC Opava (loan)	11	(2)
2011–2012	→ Legia Warsaw (loan)	13	(2)
2013–2015	Baumit Jablonec	33	(11)
Total		218	(50)

International career
2001	Czech Republic U19	2	(1)
2002–2003	Czech Republic U20	11	(1)
2004	Czech Republic U21	1	(0)
2010–2011	Czech Republic	4	(0)

Managerial career
- 2018: Valašské Meziříčí
- 2018–2019: Viktoria Otrokovice
- 2020: Frydek-Mistek
- * Club domestic league appearances and goals

Michal Hubník (born 1 June 1983) is a Czech football manager and former player who played as a striker. His brother Roman Hubník was also a professional footballer.

== Career ==
=== Club ===
In February 2011, his club Sigma Olomouc loaned him for the rest of the season to Legia Warszawa.

=== International ===
He played four matches for the Czech Republic national football team.

== Honours ==
Legia Warsaw

- Polish Cup: 2010–11, 2011–12

Sigma Olomouc

- Czech Supercup: 2012

Baumit Jablonec

- Czech Cup: 2012–13
- Czech Supercup: 2013
