= Miroslav Obermajer =

Czech former football defender (born 1973)

Personal information
- Date of birth: 5 October 1973 (age 53)
- Place of birth: Czechoslovakia
- Height: 1.89 m (6 ft 2 in)
- Position: Defender

Senior career*
Years	Team	Apps	(Gls)
1997–2005	Bohemians 1905	54	(2)
2005	České Budějovice	9	(0)
2005–2009	Bohemians (Střížkov)	23	(0)
Total		86	(2)
- * Club domestic league appearances and goals

Miroslav Obermajer (born 5 October 1973) is a Czech former football defender. He played for Bohemians 1905 in the Czech First League, where he was captain.

In 2005, Obermajer joined Czech First League side České Budějovice in January. After the summer, Obermajer moved to FK Bohemians Prague (Střížkov) in the Bohemian Football League, where he also became captain.

Obermajer was involved with a corruption scandal involving a May 2009 Czech First League match between Bohemians (Střížkov) and Olomouc. The outcome of the scandal, settled in 2011, saw Olomouc goalkeeper Petr Drobisz suspended for 18 months for giving a bribe of 300,000 CZK to Obermajer, but Obermajer himself was acquitted.
