= Ladislav Onofrej =

Slovak footballer

Personal information
- Date of birth: 20 September 1977 (age 49)
- Place of birth: Košice, Czechoslovakia
- Height: 1.80 m (5 ft 11 in)
- Position: Midfielder

Senior career*
Years	Team	Apps	(Gls)
1995–1998	Lokomotíva Košice		
1998–2001	1. FC Košice	40	(1)
2001–2004	Slovan Bratislava	87	(17)
2004–2005	Drnovice	25	(2)
2005–2010	Sigma Olomouc	100	(6)
2010–2013	1. HFK Olomouc		
2013–2016	SV Spitz/Donau	105	(59)
Total		357	(85)

Managerial career
- 2015–2019: Sigma Olomouc (Assistant)
- * Club domestic league appearances and goals as of 6 May 2010

Ladislav Onofrej (born 20 September 1977 in Košice) is retired Slovak footballer who played as a midfielder.
