= Jakub Štochl =

Czech footballer (born 1987)

Personal information
- Date of birth: 2 February 1987 (age 39)
- Place of birth: Hořovice, Czechoslovakia
- Height: 1.91 m (6 ft 3 in)
- Position: Defender

Team information
- Current team: Vlašim
- Number: 13

Youth career
- 1995–2002: SK Hořovice
- 2002–2007: 1. FK Příbram

Senior career*
Years	Team	Apps	(Gls)
2007–2011	1. FK Příbram	81	(1)
2011–2014	Jablonec	32	(1)
2013	→ Bohemians 1905 (loan)	15	(1)
2014–	Vlašim	13	(3)
- * Club domestic league appearances and goals as of 5 November 2014

Jakub Štochl (born 2 February 1987) is a professional Czech football player who currently plays for Vlašim.
