= Martin Komárek =

Czech footballer (born 1984)

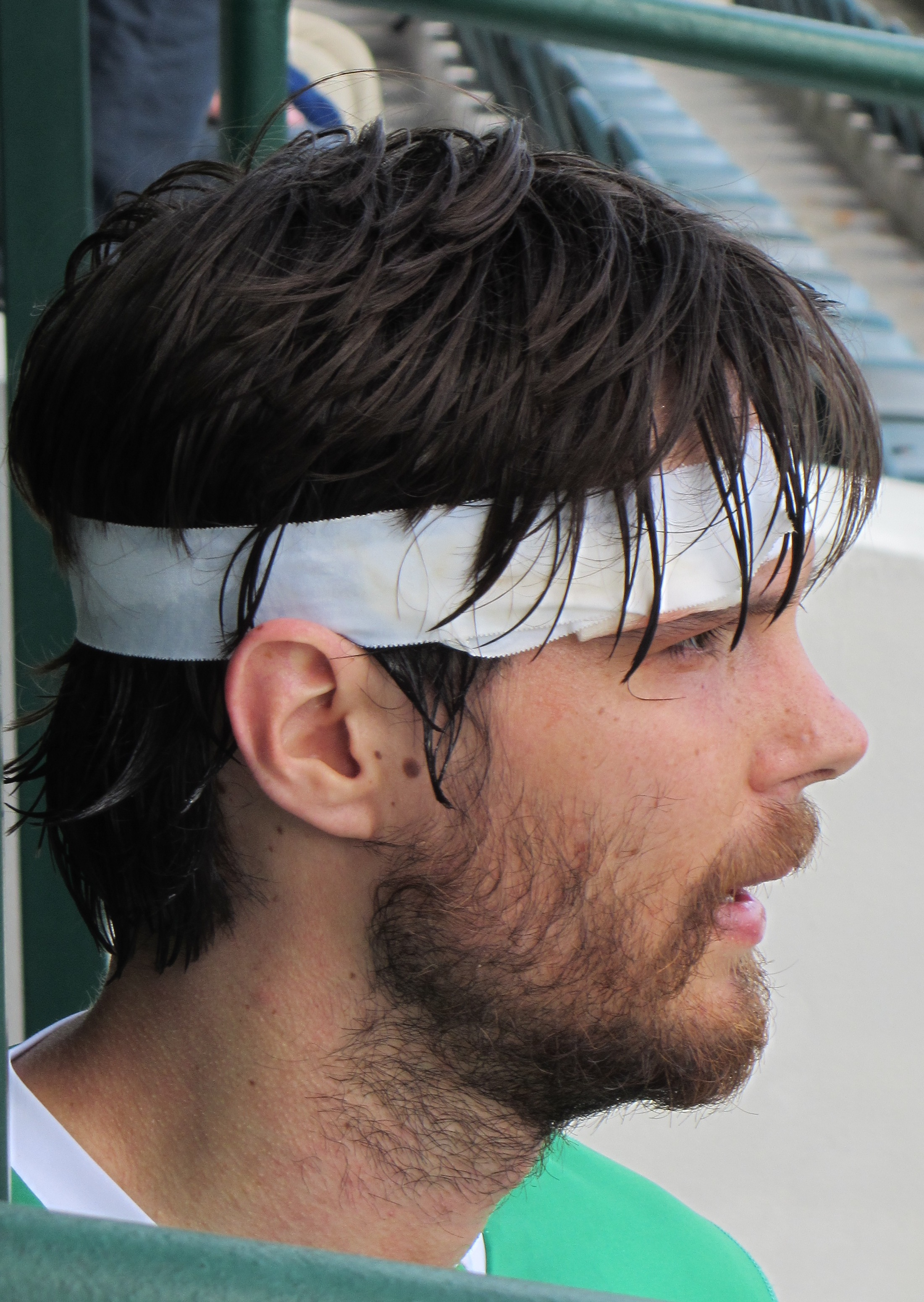
- Martin Komárek in 2014

Personal information
- Date of birth: 14 October 1984 (age 42)
- Place of birth: Czechoslovakia
- Height: 1.89 m (6 ft 2 1/2 in)
- Position: Defender

Team information
- Current team: Loko Vltavín

Youth career
- 1991–1999: SK Bouzov
- 1999–2001: FK Mohelnice-Moravičany
- 2001–2003: SK Sigma Olomouc

Senior career*
Years	Team	Apps	(Gls)
2003–2010	Sigma Olomouc	56	(2)
2010–2011	Senica	10	(0)
2011–2012	Vysočina Jihlava	21	(0)
2013	Vostok	17	(0)
2014–	Loko Vltavín	8	(0)
- * Club domestic league appearances and goals as of 9 May 2014

Martin Komárek (born 14 October 1984) is a Czech football player who currently plays for Loko Vltavín in the Czech 2. Liga.
