= Vlastimil Palička =

Czech footballer and manager

Personal information
- Date of birth: 23 July 1954 (age 72)
- Place of birth: Olomouc, Czechoslovakia

Senior career*
Years	Team	Apps	(Gls)
- TJ Sigma Lutín
1974–1975	Dukla Brno		
1975–1976	VTJ Hradec Králové		
1976–1977	Sigma Olomouc		
1977–1979	Škoda Plzeň	51	(5)
1980–1981	TŽ Třinec		
1982–1986	Sigma Olomouc	82	(2)
1986–1988	FK Drnovice		
1988–1989	SK Spartak Hulín		

Managerial career
- 1999–2001: FK Baník Ratíškovice
- 2001–2003: FK Jablonec
- 2004: FC Tescoma Zlín
- 2004–2005: SFC Opava
- 2006: SK Sigma Olomouc
- 2006–2007: AS Trenčín
- 2008–2009: FC Vítkovice
- * Club domestic league appearances and goals

Vlastimil Palička (born 23 July 1954) is a Czech football manager and former player. He managed FK Jablonec in the Czech First League between 2001 and 2003. He has also managed three other top-flight clubs in the Czech Republic and one in Slovakia.

As a player, Palička played in the Czechoslovak First League for Olomouc and Plzeň, as well as other clubs including Lutín, Dukla Brno, Hradec Králové, Třinec, Drnovice and Hulín between 1962 and 1989.

== Management career ==
=== Early career ===
Palička was manager of Czech 2. Liga side FK Baník Ratíškovice for two years. He led the club to the final of the Czech Cup in 2000.

=== Gambrinus liga ===
Palička joined Jablonec as manager in June 2001, replacing Jaroslav Hřebík. Under Palička, Jablonec finished 9th in the 2001–02 Czech First League and 12th the following season. The club also reached the final of the Czech Cup in 2003, where they lost to Teplice. Following a poor start to the 2003–04 Czech First League, Palička was sacked in October with the club fourteenth in the league.

In May 2004, Palička replaced Vlastislav Mareček as manager of FC Tescoma Zlín, signing a contract until the end of June 2006. However his tenure lasted just a matter of months, as he was replaced in November of the same year.

Shortly after parting with Zlín, Palička was appointed manager of fellow Czech First League side SFC Opava on a short-term basis, before being given the job until the end of the season. In April 2005 he was given a contract extension until mid-2007. However Opava finished the 2004–05 Czech First League bottom of the league and Palička left at the end of the season.

In June 2006 he joined SK Sigma Olomouc but was replaced in August of the same year, having achieved a draw and three defeats from four league matches.

=== Slovakia ===
Later in 2006 Palička joined Slovak First League club AS Trenčín as manager, securing a 1–1 draw against league leaders MŠK Žilina in his first match. Despite inheriting a side which was bottom of the league when he arrived, Palička ensured the survival of the club in the 2006–07 Slovak Superliga. However he was replaced at the end of the season by English manager Rob McDonald.

=== Return to the Czech Republic ===
In 2008 Palička was appointed manager of Czech 2. Liga side FC Vítkovice. In his first season, he led the team to safety in the 2008–09 Czech 2. Liga. After a poor start to the following season, during which the club had won just 1 of 15 games and rested at the bottom of the league, Palička was removed from his position.

In 2011, he was at 1. HFK Olomouc as the head coach of the youth team.

== Honours ==
=== Managerial ===
Baník Ratíškovice

Czech Cup Runners-Up (1): 1999–2000

Jablonec

Czech Cup Runners-Up (1): 2002–2003
