= Jan Navrátil =

Czech footballer

Personal information
- Full name: Jan Navrátil
- Date of birth: 13 April 1990 (age 36)
- Place of birth: Olomouc, Czechoslovakia
- Height: 1.70 m (5 ft 7 in)
- Position: Winger

Team information
- Current team: Artis Brno
- Number: 30

Youth career
- 1997–2001: Zubr Přerov
- 2001–2009: Sigma Olomouc

Senior career*
Years	Team	Apps	(Gls)
2009–2016	Sigma Olomouc	178	(31)
2016–2017	Slovan Liberec	10	(0)
2017–2022	1. FC Slovácko	136	(6)
2022–2026	Sigma Olomouc	101	(11)
2026–	Artis Brno	14	(3)

International career
2011–2012	Czech Republic U21	5	(0)
2022	Czech Republic	2	(0)
- * Club domestic league appearances and goals as of 24 May 2026

Jan Navrátil (born 13 April 1990) is a Czech professional footballer who plays as a midfielder for Czech First League club Artis Brno.

== Honours ==
Sigma Olomouc

- Czech Cup: 2011–12
- Czech Supercup: 2012
