= Antonín Holub =

Czech footballer

Personal information
- Date of birth: 8 March 1986 (age 40)
- Place of birth: Czechoslovakia
- Height: 1.76 m (5 ft 9 in)
- Position: Midfielder

Senior career*
Years	Team	Apps	(Gls)
2005–2013	SK Kladno	55	(4)
2007	→ TJ Sokol Ovčáry (loan)		
2007	→ FK Dukla Prague (loan)	15	(2)
2012	→ FK Baník Most (loan)	13	(0)
2012–2013	→ FK Baník Sokolov (loan)	24	(1)
- * Club domestic league appearances and goals as of 30 June 2014

Antonín Holub (born 8 March 1986) is a professional Czech football player who played in the Czech First League for SK Kladno.
