= Tomáš Janotka =

Czech footballer

Personal information
- Full name: Tomáš Janotka
- Date of birth: 4 March 1982 (age 44)
- Place of birth: Brno, Czechoslovakia
- Height: 1.82 m (5 ft 11 1/2 in)
- Position: Right back

Youth career
- 1988–1996: Židenice
- 1996–1997: Bučovice
- 1997–1998: Drnovice
- 1999–2001: Židenice

Senior career*
Years	Team	Apps	(Gls)
2002–2003	VMG Kyjov		
2003–2004	Poštorná		
2004	Židenice		
2005–2015	Sigma Olomouc	171	(16)
2013–2014	→ Brno (loan)	24	(1)
2015	→ České Budějovice (loan)	13	(1)

Managerial career
- 2023–2024: Sigma Olomouc B
- 2024–2026: Sigma Olomouc
- * Club domestic league appearances and goals as of 9 August 2013

Tomáš Janotka (born 4 March 1982) is a Czech football manager and former player.

Janotka joined reserve team Sigma Olomouc B as manager on 13 June 2023, taking over from Augustin Chromý. On 29 May 2024, Janotka was appointed as the manager of Sigma Olomouc.

Janotka was awarded as the manager of the 2023–24 Czech National Football League season by the League Football Association.

== Honours ==
SK Sigma Olomouc

- Czech Cup: 2011–12
- Czech Supercup: 2012
