= Michal Ordoš =

Czech footballer

Personal information
- Date of birth: 27 January 1983 (age 43)
- Place of birth: Znojmo, Czechoslovakia
- Height: 1.90 m (6 ft 3 in)
- Position: Forward

Team information
- Current team: Blansko

Youth career
- 1990–1993: Sokol Troskotovice
- 1993–1996: SK Mikulov
- 1996–1999: Zeman Brno
- 1999–2003: Slovácko

Senior career*
Years	Team	Apps	(Gls)
2003–2006	Slovácko	27	(5)
2006–2007	Mladá Boleslav	20	(2)
2007–2008	Bohemians 1905	24	(3)
2008–2011	Sigma Olomouc	76	(23)
2011	Kapfenberg	14	(4)
2012–2016	Sigma Olomouc	28	(16)
2016–2017	Karmiotissa	32	(4)
2017	SC Retz	13	(4)
2018	SC Wieselburg		
2018–2019	Znojmo	11	(1)
2019–	Blansko		

International career^{‡}
2012–2013	Czech Republic	2	(0)
- * Club domestic league appearances and goals as of 00:55, 20 May 2019 (UTC) ‡ National team caps and goals as of 8 February 2013

Michal Ordoš (born 27 January 1983) is a Czech professional footballer who plays as a forward for FK Blansko.

== Club career ==
Ordoš is a prolific goalscorer. In the 2008–09 season, he scored nine goals. In the 2009-2010 season Ordoš scored 12 goals, becoming the Gambrinus liga top-scorer.

In July 2017, Ordoš signed with Austrian club SC Retz. He left the club at the end of the year to join another Austrian club SC Wieselburg.

Ordoš joined 1. SC Znojmo for the 2017–18 Czech First League on 9 June 2018. He joined FK Blansko in February 2019.

== International career ==
On 14 November 2012, Ordoš debuted for the Czech senior squad in a friendly match against Slovakia, becoming the oldest debutant at the age of 29. His second and last international match was an away match against Turkey on 6 February 2013, in which the Czechs won 0–2.

== Honours ==
Sigma Olomouc

- Czech Cup: 2011–12
- Czech Supercup: 2012
