= Zdeněk Psotka =

Czech footballer and manager

Personal information
- Date of birth: 18 November 1973 (age 52)
- Place of birth: Olomouc, Czechoslovakia
- Position: Goalkeeper

Youth career
- 1980–1986: Sokol Nedvězí
- 1987–1991: Sigma Olomouc

Senior career*
Years	Team	Apps	(Gls)
1991–1992	Sigma Olomouc		
1992–1993	SK Litovel		
1993–1994	ČSK Uherský Brod		
1994	Sigma Olomouc		
1995	Sigma Hodolany		
1995–1997	Sigma Olomouc		
1997–2000	Horka nad Moravou		
2000–2007	Sigma Olomouc		
2007	Sokol Kožušany		

Managerial career
- 2000–2005: Sigma Olomouc B
- 2008–2011: Sigma Olomouc
- 2012: FK Senica
- * Club domestic league appearances and goals

Zdeněk Psotka (born 18 November 1973) is a Czech former football player who currently works as a sport director for SK Sigma Olomouc.

He was announced as the new manager of the Olomouc first team in May 2008, replacing caretaker manager Jiří Fryš. After three and a half years in charge, Psotka was sacked in November 2011 with Olomouc at the bottom of the Gambrinus liga.
