= Pavel Šultes =

Czech footballer

Personal information
- Full name: Pavel Šultes
- Date of birth: 15 September 1985 (age 41)
- Place of birth: Valtice, Czechoslovakia
- Height: 1.80 m (5 ft 11 in)
- Position: Forward

Team information
- Current team: FK Kralupy 1901

Youth career
- 1990–2000: Slovan Břeclav
- 2000–2001: Tatran Poštorná
- 2002–2004: Sigma Olomouc

Senior career*
Years	Team	Apps	(Gls)
2004–2011	Sigma Olomouc	66	(16)
2006	→ SFC Opava (loan)	14	(3)
2007–2008	→ 1. FC Slovácko (loan)	28	(7)
2008–2009	→ SFC Opava (loan)	24	(8)
2011–2012	Polonia Warsaw	27	(2)
2012–2013	Ruch Chorzów	27	(3)
2013–2015	Mladá Boleslav	20	(2)
2014	→ Hradec Králové (loan)	3	(0)
2015	→ Akzhayik (loan)	4	(1)
2015–2017	SK Černolice		
2017–2018	SV Freistadt	11	(6)
2018	SK Černolice		
2018–2020	Přední Kopanina	32	(17)
2020	SV Pichl		
2020–2022	Přední Kopanina		
2022	SK Altheim		
2023–2024	UFC Mettmach		
2024–	FK Kralupy 1901		
- * Club domestic league appearances and goals as of 15 September 2024

Pavel Šultes (born 15 September 1985) is a Czech footballer who plays as a forward who plays for FK Kralupy 1901.

== Career ==
=== Club ===
With nine goals in the 2009–10 season of Gambrinus liga, he became one of the best goalscorers of the league.

In June 2011, he joined Polish club Polonia Warsaw on a three-year contract.

In June 2012, he joined Polish club Ruch Chorzów.
