= Dominik Kraut =

Czech footballer

Personal information
- Date of birth: 15 January 1990 (age 36)
- Place of birth: Czechoslovakia
- Height: 1.84 m (6 ft 1/2 in)
- Position: Striker

Team information
- Current team: FC Hlučín

Youth career
- 1996–2000: Sokol Kobeřice
- 2000–2003: SFC Opava
- 2003–2009: FC Baník Ostrava

Senior career*
| Years | Team | Apps | (Gls) |
| 2009–2014 | FC Baník Ostrava | 91 | (8) |
| 2010 | → FK Ústí nad Labem (loan) | 15 | (3) |
| 2014 | 1. FK Příbram | 8 | (9) |
| 2014–2015 | FC Fastav Zlín | 21 | (2) |
| 2015–2016 | FC Hlučín | | |
| 2016–2017 | MFK Vítkovice | 12 | (2) |
| 2017– | FC Hlučín | | |

International career
| 2011 | Czech Republic U20 | 1 | (0) |
| 2008–2009 | Czech Republic U19 | 7 | (1) |
| 2006–2007 | Czech Republic U17 | 10 | (3) |
| 2005–2006 | Czech Republic U16 | 4 | (0) |
- * Club domestic league appearances and goals as of 30 June 2012

Dominik Kraut (born 15 January 1990) is a Czech football player who currently plays for FC Hlučín.
