= Adrian Rolko =

Czech footballer (born 1978)

Personal information
- Date of birth: 14 September 1978 (age 48)
- Place of birth: Hradec Králové, Czechoslovakia
- Height: 2.02 m (6 ft 8 in)
- Position: Defender

Senior career*
Years	Team	Apps	(Gls)
1998–2006	Hradec Králové	97	(8)
2002	→ HFK Olomouc (loan)	1	(0)
2006–2013	Mladá Boleslav	144	(10)
2013–2015	Hradec Králové	46	(2)

Managerial career
- ?–2017: Hradec Králové (youth)
- 2017–2021: Mladá Boleslav (assistant)
- 2021–: Hradec Králové (assistant)
- 2024–: Hradec Králové B
- * Club domestic league appearances and goals

Adrian Rolko (born 14 September 1978) is a retired Czech defender. At 2.02 m (6 ft 7 1/2 in), he had been one of the tallest players in the Czech league.

He made his move to FK Mladá Boleslav from FC Hradec Králové, the club he had been with since youth. He also has a loan spell at HFK Olomouc in 2002 and a short stay at French division 4 side GAP HAFC in 2004 behind him.
