= Protivanov =

- Market town
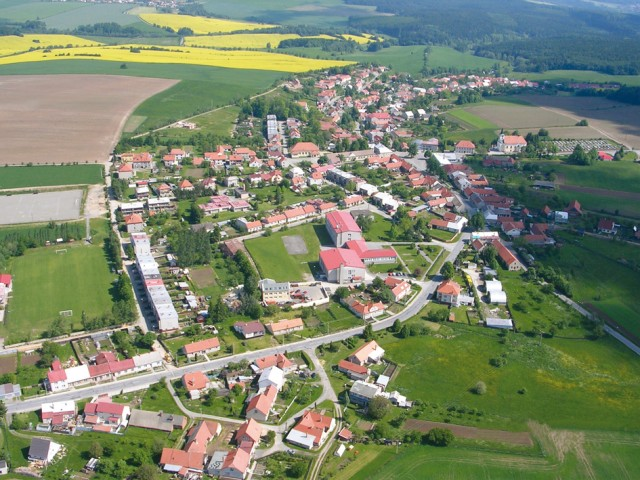
- Aerial view

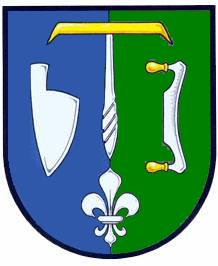
- Flag Coat of arms

- Location in the Czech Republic
- Coordinates: 49°29′0″N 16°50′9″E
- Country: Czech Republic
- Region: Olomouc
- District: Prostějov
- First mentioned: 1505

Area
  - Total: 18.82 km^{2} (7.27 sq mi)
- Elevation: 684 m (2,244 ft)

Population (2026-01-01)
  - Total: 1,095
  - Density: 58.18/km^{2} (150.7/sq mi)
- Time zone: UTC+1 (CET)
  - Summer (DST): UTC+2 (CEST)
- Postal code: 798 48
- Website: www.protivanov.com

Protivanov (Czech pronunciation: [ˈprocɪvanof]) is a market town in Prostějov District in the Olomouc Region of the Czech Republic. It has about 1,100 inhabitants.

== Etymology ==
The name is probably derived from the personal name Protiva or Protivan.

== Geography ==
Protivanov is located about 18 kilometres (11 mi) west of Prostějov and 31 km (19 mi) west of Olomouc. It lies in the Drahany Highlands. The highest point is the hill Skály at 724 m (2,375 ft) above sea level.

== History ==
The first written mention of Protivanov is from 1505. The inhabitants made a living mainly by farming, woodworking and weaving. Until the establishment of an independent municipality in 1848, the village was a part of the Boskovice estate and shared its owners. In 1873, Protivanov was promoted to a market town.

== Demographics ==
Historical population

Year	Pop.	±%
1869	1,227	—
1880	1,306	+6.4%
1890	1,381	+5.7%
1900	1,361	−1.4%
1910	1,402	+3.0%

Year	Pop.	±%
1921	1,340	−4.4%
1930	1,406	+4.9%
1950	1,293	−8.0%
1961	1,323	+2.3%
1970	1,210	−8.5%

Year	Pop.	±%
1980	1,123	−7.2%
1991	1,142	+1.7%
2001	1,087	−4.8%
2011	1,028	−5.4%
2021	1,012	−1.6%

Source: Censuses

== Transport ==
There are no railways or major roads passing through the municipality.

== Sights ==
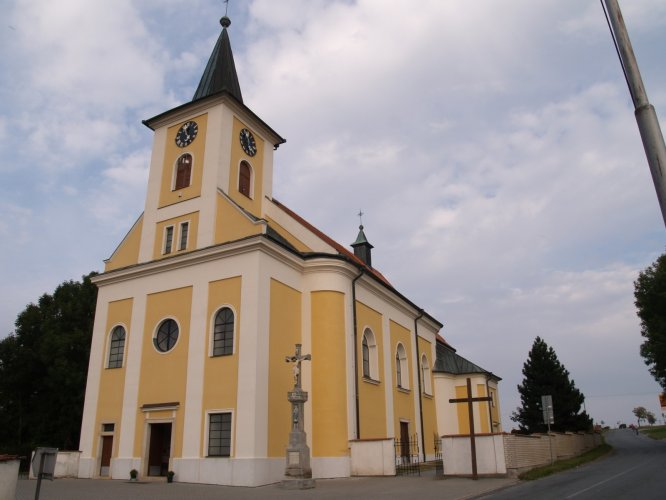
Church of the Nativity of the Virgin Mary

The main landmark of Protivanov is the Church of the Nativity of the Virgin Mary. It was built in the Neoclassical style in 1772.
