= Jan Riegel =

Czech footballer (born 1980)

Personal information
- Date of birth: 3 August 1980 (age 46)
- Place of birth: Příbram, Czechoslovakia
- Height: 1.93 m (6 ft 4 in)
- Position: Defender

Senior career*
Years	Team	Apps	(Gls)
1999–2006	1. FK Příbram	128	(10)
2000	MUS Most		
2000	ZP Milín		
2002	→ FK Drnovice (loan)	4	(1)
2006–2008	Mladá Boleslav	6	(1)
2008	→ Hradec Králové (loan)	6	(0)
2008–2013	České Budějovice	72	(0)

International career
2001–2002	Czech Republic U21	3	(0)
- * Club domestic league appearances and goals

Jan Riegel (born 3 August 1980) is a Czech former professional footballer who played as a defender, making over 200 appearances in the Czech First League. Riegel represented the Czech Republic at under-21 level, making three appearances between 2001 and 2002.

== Career ==
=== Early career ===
Riegel started his career at Příbram, making his debut on 30 May 1999 in a Gambrinus liga match against Slovan Liberec.

He went on to make 10 appearances for Příbram in the 2000–01 season and 19 more the following season.

Riegel joined Drnovice on loan in April 2002. This time was marked by financial instability of Drnovice, which saw nine players sold to Příbram at the same time. At the end of the 2001–02 Gambrinus liga season, Drnovice were relegated and Riegel returned to Příbram.

After returning from Drnovice, Riegel established himself in Příbram's first team, making 98 further first team appearances and starting every game in the 2005–06 season.

=== Mladá Boleslav and Hradec Králové ===
On 26 July 2006, Riegel made his debut for Mladá Boleslav in the qualifying round of the 2006–07 UEFA Champions League against Vålerenga. He made his league debut on 5 August 2006 against 1. FC Slovácko. Riegel made his sixth and ultimately final league appearance for Mladá Boleslav on 1 October 2006.

In 2007, Riegel underwent knee surgery on two separate occasions. Riegel joined Czech 2. Liga side Hradec Králové in January 2008.

=== České Budějovice ===
In June 2008, Riegel signed a long-term contract with České Budějovice. In his first season with the club, Riegel scored three own goals, more than any other player in the 2008–09 Gambrinus liga.

In the 2010–11 season, Riegel made 10 appearances for Budějovice, before sustaining a knee injury in February 2011 in a winter training match against SK Slavia Prague. Riegel didn't play again that season.

In summer 2011, Riegel again underwent knee surgery, thus ruling him out of action for at least six more months.
