= Radek Matějek =

Czech football referee

- Born: 5 February 1973 (age 53); Czechoslovakia

Domestic
Years	League	Role

International
Years	League	Role
2004–	FIFA listed	Referee

Radek Matějek (born 5 February 1973) is a Czech football referee. He has been a full international for FIFA since 2004.

== Career statistics ==
Statistics for Gambrinus liga matches only.

Season	Games	Total (yellow card)	(yellow card) per game	Total (red card)	(red card) per game	Reference
2006/07	17	66	3.88	3	0.18	
2007/08	23	89	3.87	3	0.13	
2008/09	11	37	3.36	2	0.18	
2009/10	16	62	3.88	1	0.06	
2010/11	14	36	2.57	3	0.21	
Overall	81	290	3.58	12	0.15	
Please Note: There are no available records prior to 2006/2007
