= Petr Drobisz =

Czech footballer (born 1976)

Personal information
- Date of birth: 14 July 1976 (age 50)
- Place of birth: Třinec, Czechoslovakia
- Height: 1.88 m (6 ft 2 in)
- Position: Goalkeeper

Youth career
- 1986–1990: TŽ Třinec
- 1990–1991: FC Vítkovice

Senior career*
Years	Team	Apps	(Gls)
1991–1997	Železárny Třinec	56	(0)
1998–2000	FK Jablonec 97	6	(0)
2000–2007	1. FC Slovácko	186	(0)
2007–2011	SK Sigma Olomouc	94	(0)
2013–2014	1. SC Znojmo	2	(0)
Total		344	(0)
- * Club domestic league appearances and goals

Petr Drobisz (born 14 July 1976 is a Czech former professional footballer who played as a goalkeeper. Drobisz was suspended as part of an enquiry into corruption allegations, as announced by the Czech Football Association on 9 June 2011. This was later confirmed on 18 August 2011 as an 18-month suspension. After his ban ended in February 2013, he signed with the newly promoted Znojmo for the 2013–14 season.
