= Andrův stadion =

Football stadium in Olomouc, Czech Republic

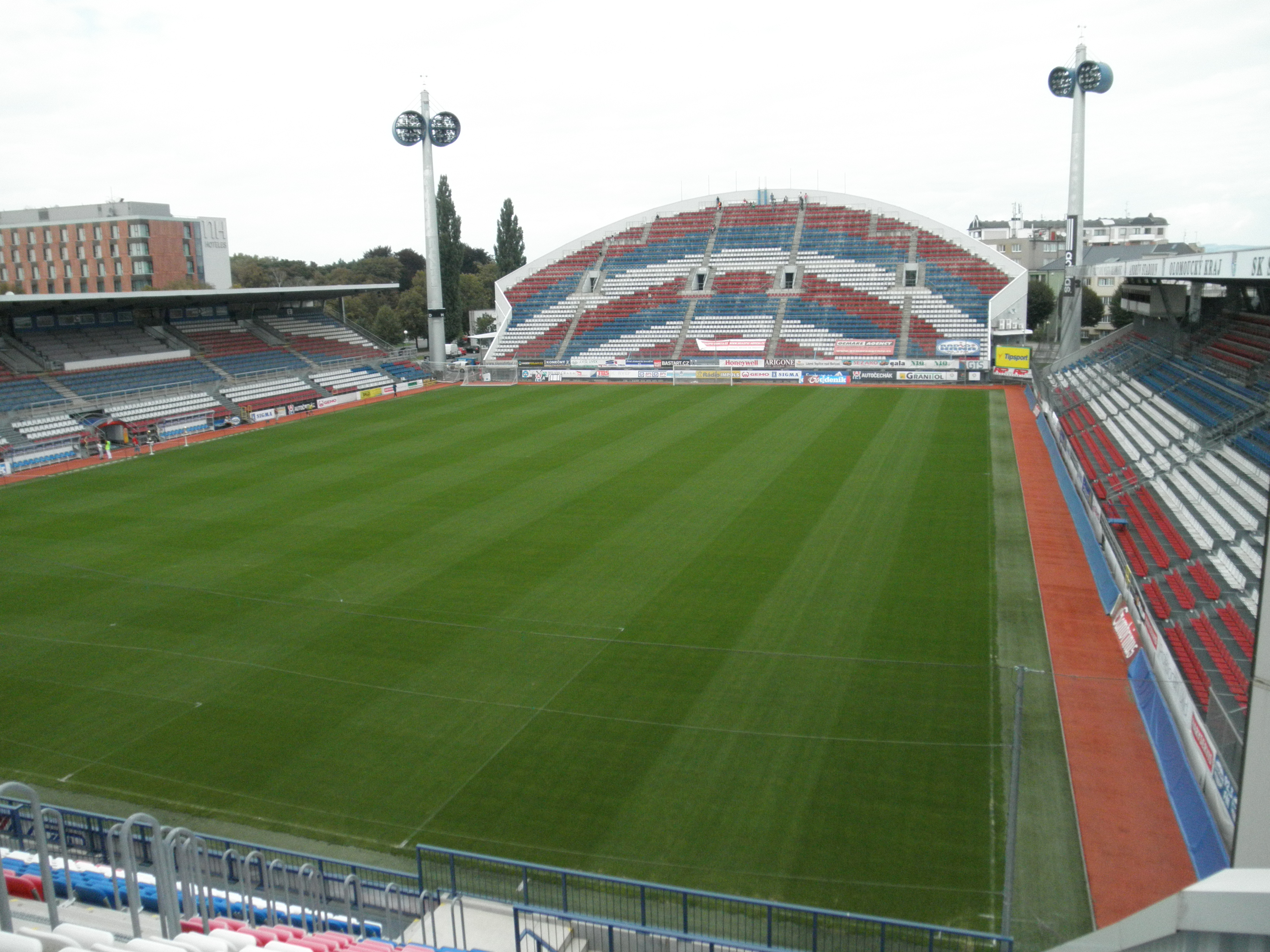
- Interactive map of Andrův stadion
- Former names: Stadion Míru
- Location: Olomouc, Czech Republic
- Coordinates: 49°36′00″N 17°14′54″E
- Owner: SK Sigma Olomouc
- Operator: SK Sigma Olomouc
- Capacity: 12,474
- Field size: 105m x 68m

Construction
- Opened: 1940
- Renovated: 1977, 1998

Tenant
- SK Sigma Olomouc

Andrův stadion is a football stadium in Olomouc, Czech Republic. It is the home ground of SK Sigma Olomouc and occasionally hosts matches of the Czech Republic national team. The stadium holds 12,474 people.

It was built in 1940 and is named after Josef Ander (1888–1976), local interwar businessman and philanthropist who also sponsored football in Olomouc. In the past, historical clubs SK Olomouc ASO and Křídla vlasti Olomouc played there.

== International football matches ==
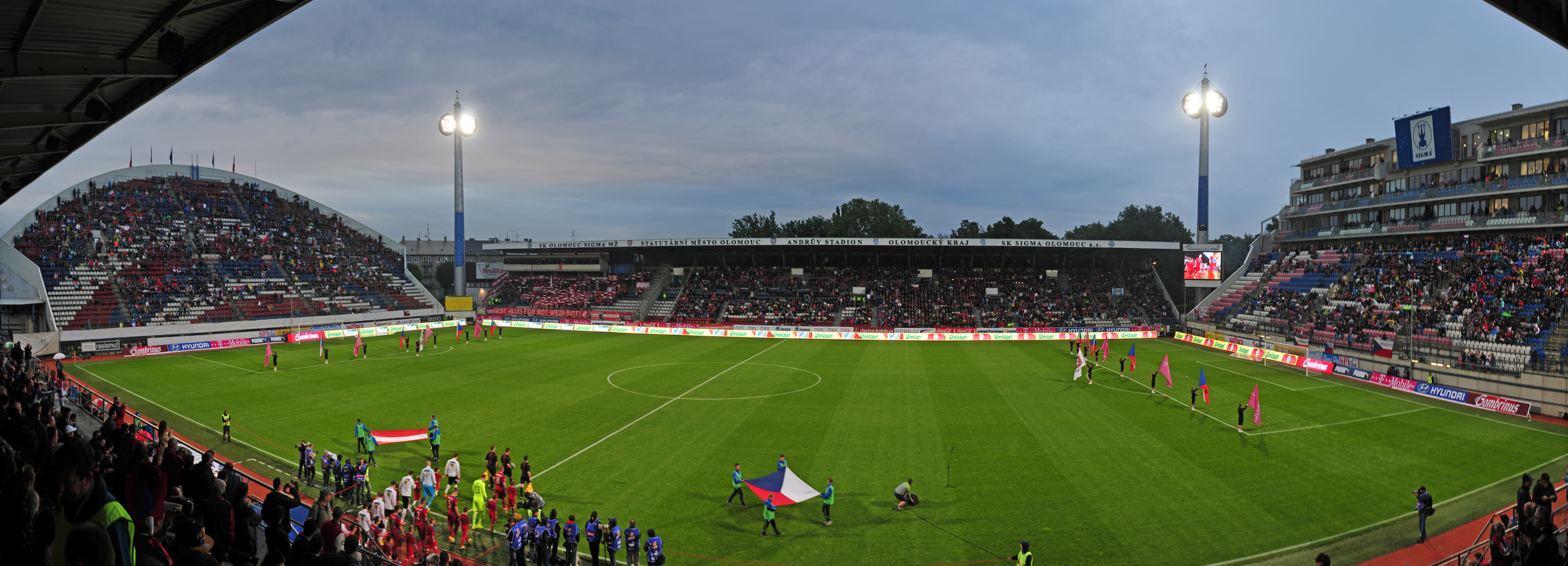
Czech Republic vs Austria in 2014

The Czech Republic have played 16 full international matches at Andrův stadion, the first one taking place in 1998. These have mainly been matches against less attractive opposition where a relatively small crowd is expected, and it has therefore been unnecessary to play the match in Prague.

25 March 1998

Czech Republic	2–1	Republic of Ireland
Šmicer 50'; Lasota 76'	(Report)	Breen 10'

International Challenge Match
Attendance: 9,405
Referee: Attila Juhos (Hungary)

21 August 2002

Czech Republic	4–1	Slovakia
Koller 31' 64'; Rosický 70' 78'	(Report)	Németh 8'

International Challenge Match
Attendance: 11,986
Referee: Georgios Douros (Greece)

11 June 2003

Czech Republic	5–0	Moldova
Šmicer 42'; Koller 73' (pen.); Štajner 82'; Lokvenc 88', 90'	(Report)

UEFA Euro 2004 qualifying
Attendance: 12,097
Referee: Kristinn Jakobsson (Iceland)

7 September 2005

Czech Republic	4–1	Armenia
Heinz 47'; Polák 52' 76'; Baroš 58'	(Report)	Hakobyan 85'

2006 FIFA World Cup qualification (UEFA)
Attendance: 12.015
Referee: Martin Hansson (Sweden)

7 September 2010

Czech Republic	0–1	Lithuania
	(Report)	Šernas 25'

UEFA Euro 2012 qualifying
Attendance: 12,038
Referee: Alon Yefet (Israel)

14 November 2012

Czech Republic	3–0	Slovakia
Lafata 3', 6'; Dočkal 73'	(Report)

International Challenge Match
Attendance: 11,464
Referee: Harald Lechner (Austria)

22 March 2013

Czech Republic	0–3	Denmark
	(Report)	Cornelius 57'; Kjær 67'; Zimling 82'

2014 FIFA World Cup qualification (UEFA)
Attendance: 12,288
Referee: Manuel De Sousa (Portugal)

15 November 2013

Czech Republic	2–0	Canada
Čelůstka 3'; Hořava 81'	(Report)

International Challenge Match
Attendance: 9,749
Referee: Bryn Markham (Wales)

3 June 2014

Czech Republic	1–2	Austria
Hořava 42'	(Report)	Sabitzer 34'; Baumgartlinger 72'

International Challenge Match
Attendance: 10,653
Referee: Pol van Boekel (Netherlands)

10 June 2019

Czech Republic	3–0	Montenegro
Jankto 18'; Kopitović 49' (o.g.); Schick 82' (pen.)	(Report)

UEFA Euro 2020 qualifying
Attendance: 11,565
Referee: Vladislav Bezborodov (Russia)

7 September 2020

Czech Republic	1–2	Scotland
Pešek 12'	(Report)	Dykes 27'; Christie 52' (pen.)

2020–21 UEFA Nations League
Attendance: 0
Referee: Serdar Gözübüyük (Netherlands)

11 November 2021

Czech Republic	7–0	Kuwait
Barák 26'; Pešek 45' 46'; Souček 57'; Novák 60'; Sýkora 83' 88'	(Report)

International Challenge Match
Attendance: 5,367
Referee: Peter Kráľovič (Slovakia)

16 November 2022

Czech Republic	5–0	Faroe Islands
Chytil 13' 19' 23'; Černý 42'; Stronati 76'	(Report)

International Challenge Match
Attendance: 10,762
Referee: Martin Dohál (Slovakia)

20 November 2023

Czech Republic	3–0	Moldova
Douděra 14'; Chorý 72'; Souček 90'	(Report)

UEFA Euro 2024 qualifying
Attendance: 11,653
Referee: Sandro Schärer (Switzerland)

19 November 2024

Czech Republic	2–1	Georgia
Šulc 3'; Hložek 24'	(Report)	Mikautadze 60'

2024–25 UEFA Nations League
Attendance: 12,221
Referee: Anastasios Papapetrou (Greece)

17 November 2025

Czech Republic	6–0	Gibraltar
Douděra 5'; Chorý 18'; Coufal 32'; Karabec 39'; Souček 44'; Hranáč 51'	(Report)

2026 FIFA World Cup qualification (UEFA)
Attendance: 6,587
Referee: Sascha Stegemann (Germany)

== See also ==
- List of football stadiums in the Czech Republic
- Lists of stadiums
