= Czech Supercup =

Annual football match

Český Superpohár
- Organiser(s): Czech Football Association (CZFA)
- Founded: 2010; 16 years ago
- Abolished: 2015; 11 years ago
- Region: Czech Republic
- Teams: 2
- Related competitions: Czech First League (qualifier); Czech Cup (qualifier)
- Last champions: FC Viktoria Plzeň (2nd title)
- Most championships: FC Viktoria Plzeň and AC Sparta Prague (2 titles)
- FC Viktoria Plzeň (2nd title)

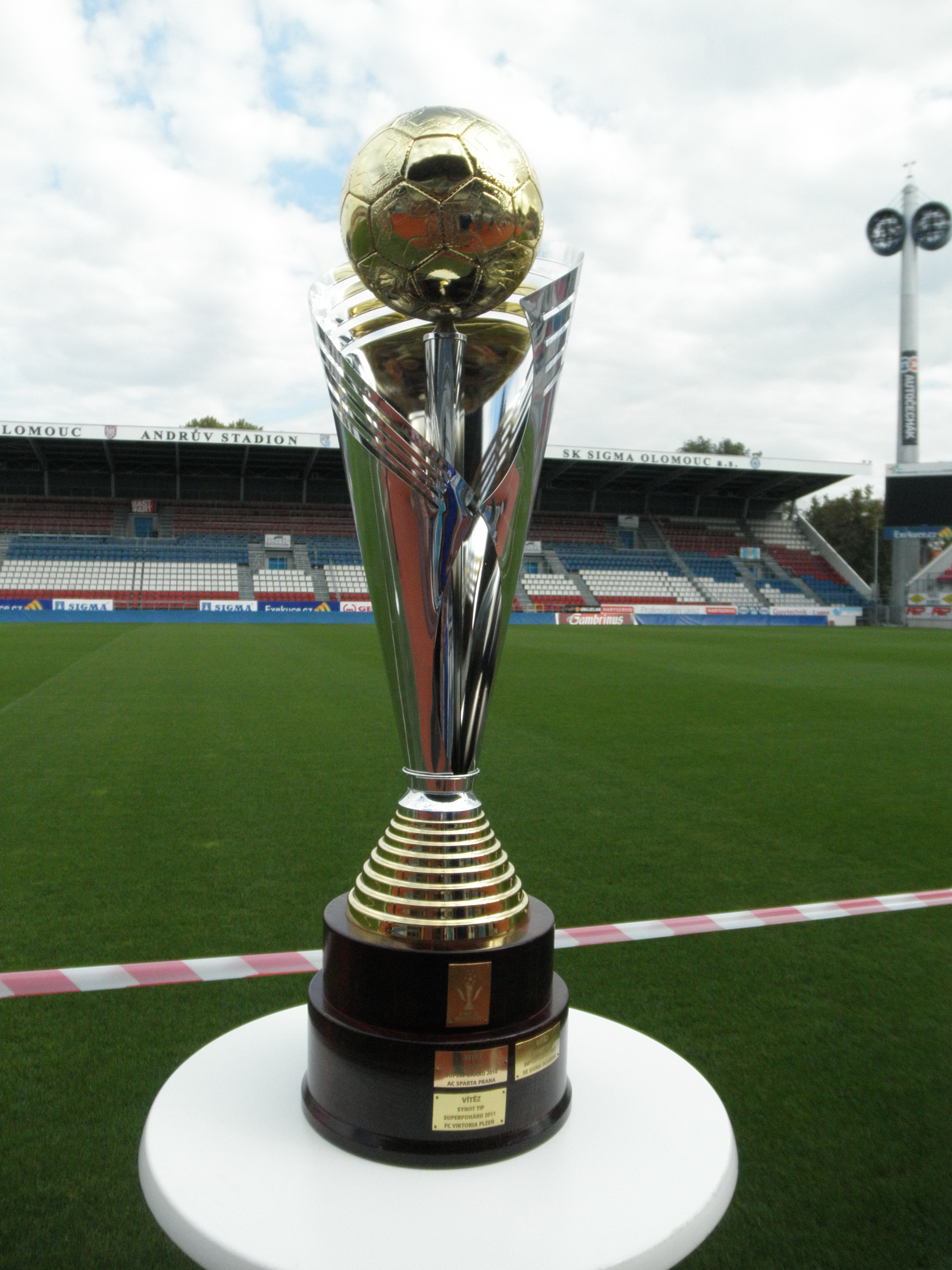
Czech Supercup in Andrův stadion.

The Czech Supercup (Czech: Český Superpohár) was an annual football match between the winners of the Czech First League and the Czech Cup, organised by the Czech Football Association. It was last sponsored by Synot Tip and was therefore officially known as the Synot Tip Supercup. The Czech Supercup was discontinued in 2015 and replaced by the Czech-Slovak Supercup from 2017 onward.

The match was held at the home stadium of the league champion.

== Winners ==
The first Supercup was held on 8 July 2010. The last Supercup was held on 18 June 2015.

Year	Supercup		
Year	Czech First League Winner	Result	Czech Cup Winner
2010	AC Sparta Prague	1–0	FC Viktoria Plzeň
2011	FC Viktoria Plzeň	1–1 (4–2 pen.)	FK Mladá Boleslav
2012	FC Slovan Liberec	0–2	SK Sigma Olomouc
2013	FC Viktoria Plzeň	2–3	FK Jablonec
2014	AC Sparta Prague	3–0	FC Viktoria Plzeň ^{1}
2015	FC Viktoria Plzeň	2–1	FC Slovan Liberec

^{1} Czech First League Runner-up competing instead of Czech Cup Winner, as the league winner won the Double.

== Performance by club ==
Club	Winners	Runners-up	Winning years	Runner-up years
FC Viktoria Plzeň	2	3	2011, 2015	2010, 2013, 2014
AC Sparta Prague	2	0	2010, 2014	–
SK Sigma Olomouc	1	0	2012	–
FK Jablonec	1	0	2013	–
FC Slovan Liberec	0	2	–	2012, 2015
FK Mladá Boleslav	0	1	–	2011

== See also ==
- Slovak Super Cup
