= SK Sigma Olomouc =

Association football club in Czech Republic

- Full name: Sportovní Klub Sigma Olomouc a.s.
- Nickname: Hanáci
- Founded: 1919; 107 years ago (as FK Hejčín Olomouc)
- Ground: Andrův stadion, Olomouc
- Capacity: 12,566
- Chairman: Ondřej Navrátil
- Manager: Jaime Monroy
- League: Czech First League
- 2025–26: 7th of 16
- Website: www.sigmafotbal.cz
Home colours	Away colours

SK Sigma Olomouc is a Czech professional football club based in the city of Olomouc. The club currently competes in the Czech First League, the first tier of Czech football. The club played in the first tier league for 30 years between 1984 and 2014, winning the Czech Cup and Czech Supercup in 2012. Being relegated to the Czech National Football League in 2014, the club won the league the subsequent season and were promoted back to the First League in 2015, but failed to stay in the top division and were relegated after only one season.

== History ==
The club was founded as FK Hejčín Olomouc in 1919, playing in the national top league for the first time in the 1982–83 season as Sigma ZTS Olomouc. The club next played in the Czechoslovak First League in the 1984–85 season, remaining in the top level of football for the rest of the Czechoslovak era. Olomouc reached the quarterfinals of the 1991–92 UEFA Cup, their best result in the competition. In the following season's competition, the club beat Turkish side Fenerbahçe 7–1 in the second leg of their second round tie and 7–2 on aggregate, before going out of the competition at the hands of Italian team Juventus.

The club qualified to play European football in 1996 after finishing as runners-up in the 1995–96 Czech First League.

Olomouc finished fourth in the 1998–99 Czech First League, again qualifying for European competition. The club was fined 5,000 Swiss francs in October 1999 for racist chanting in a UEFA Cup match against Real Mallorca's black players.

In August 2011, the club was fined 4 million Czech koruna and deducted nine points as a result of a corruption enquiry by the Football Association of the Czech Republic. Olomouc won the Czech Cup that season, but were banned by UEFA from competing in the subsequent UEFA Europa League due to the corruption sanctions. In 2014 the club finished 15th in the league, resulting in their relegation after 30 years in the top level of competition.

== Historical names ==
- 1919 – FK Hejčín Olomouc (Fotbalový klub Hejčín Olomouc)
- 1949 – Sokol MŽ Olomouc (Sokol Moravské železárny Olomouc)
- 1953 – DSO Baník MŹ Olomouc (Dobrovolná sportovní organizace Baník Moravské železárny Olomouc)
- 1960 – TJ MŽ Olomouc (Tělovýchovná jednota Moravské železárny Olomouc)
- 1966 – TJ Sigma MŽ Olomouc (Tělovýchovná jednota Sigma Moravské železárny Olomouc)
- 1979 – TJ Sigma ZTS Olomouc (Tělovýchovná jednota Sigma ZTS Olomouc)
- 1990 – SK Sigma MŽ Olomouc (Sportovní klub Sigma Moravské železárny Olomouc, a.s.)
- 1996 – SK Sigma Olomouc (Sportovní klub Sigma Olomouc, a.s.)

== Players ==
=== Current squad ===
As of 14 September 2026

Note: Flags indicate national team as defined under FIFA eligibility rules; some limited exceptions apply. Players may hold more than one non-FIFA nationality.

No.	Pos.	Nation	Player
1	GK	CZE	Patrik Berka
2	DF	GUI	Abdoulaye Sylla
3	DF	SUI	Louis Lurvink
4	DF	BRA	Léo Borges
5	DF	SVK	Tomáš Huk
6	MF	CZE	Jáchym Šíp
8	MF	CZE	Jiří Spáčil
9	FW	CZE	Jan Kliment
10	FW	CZE	Václav Sejk
11	FW	ISL	Hilmir Rafn Mikaelsson
14	MF	CRO	Marko Soldo
16	DF	CZE	Filip Slavíček
17	FW	UGA	John Paul Dembe
19	MF	CZE	Daniel Barát
21	DF	CZE	Jan Král
22	DF	CZE	Matěj Hadaš

No.	Pos.	Nation	Player
23	MF	CRO	Fabijan Krivak
24	MF	CZE	David Tkáč
26	DF	CMR	Stéphane Noumbissie (on loan from Lille)
27	MF	CZE	Filip Uriča
29	DF	SWE	Anton Ekeroth
31	GK	CRO	Anthony Pavlešić
33	DF	SVK	Matúš Malý
39	MF	CZE	Dominik Janošek
47	MF	CZE	Michal Beran
70	MF	NGR	Ahmad Ghali
80	MF	CZE	Václav Zahradníček
88	MF	HUN	Péter Baráth
91	GK	CZE	Jan Koutný
98	GK	SVK	Matúš Hruška
—	MF	POL	Igor Brzyski

=== Out on loan ===
Note: Flags indicate national team as defined under FIFA eligibility rules; some limited exceptions apply. Players may hold more than one non-FIFA nationality.

No.	Pos.	Nation	Player
—	GK	CZE	Tadeáš Stoppen (at Artis Brno)
—	MF	MKD	Tihomir Kostadinov (at Slovácko)
—	MF	LTU	Artūr Dolžnikov (at Slovácko)
—	FW	CZE	Jan Fiala (at Slovácko)
—	MF	SRB	Dario Grgić (at Ružomberok)

No.	Pos.	Nation	Player
—	MF	POL	Jakub Jezierski (at Fredrikstad)
—	MF	CZE	Matěj Kolařík (at Prostějov)
—	MF	CZE	Šimon Jalovičor (at Prostějov)
—	FW	CZE	Denis Kramář (at Prostějov)

== Player records in the Czech First League ==
As of 18 September 2026.

Highlighted players are in the current squad.

=== Most appearances ===
#	Name	Matches
1	(Czech Republic) Michal Kovář	255
2	(Czech Republic) Jan Navrátil	251
3	(Czech Republic) Michal Vepřek	247
4	(Czech Republic) Radim Kučera	239
5	(Czech Republic) Oldřich Machala	217
6	(Czech Republic) Martin Vaniak	203
7	(Czech Republic) Josef Mucha	202
8	(Czech Republic) Aleš Škerle	201
9	(Czech Republic) Stanislav Vlček	181
9	(Czech Republic) Radim Breite	181

=== Most goals ===
#	Name	Goals
1	(Czech Republic) Michal Ordoš	48
2	(Czech Republic) Stanislav Vlček	42
3	(Czech Republic) Jan Navrátil	36
4	(Czech Republic) Michal Hubník	35
5	(Slovakia) Ľubomír Reiter	31
6	(Czech Republic) Josef Mucha	28
7	(Czech Republic) Jakub Plšek	26
8	(Czech Republic) Radek Onderka	24
9	(Czech Republic) Pavel Hapal	23
10	(Czech Republic) Miroslav Baranek	21
10	(Czech Republic) Radim Kučera	21
10	(Czech Republic) Marek Heinz	21
10	(Czech Republic) David Houska	21

=== Most clean sheets ===
#	Name	Clean sheets
1	(Czech Republic) Martin Vaniak	71
2	(Czech Republic) Petr Drobisz	30
3	(Czech Republic) Miloš Buchta	28

== Managers ==
- Karel Brückner (1973–79)
- Milan Máčala (1980–81)
- Jaroslav Dočkal (1982–83)
- Karel Brückner (1983–87)
- Jiří Dunaj (1987–89)
- Erich Cviertna (1989–90)
- Karel Brückner (1990–93)
- Vlastimil Palička (1993–94)
- Dušan Radolský (1994–95)
- Vítězslav Kolda (1995)
- Karel Brückner (1995–97)
- Milan Bokša (1997–99)
- Leoš Kalvoda (caretaker) (1999)
- Dan Matuška (1999)
- Petr Žemlík (1999–00)
- Leoš Kalvoda (2000–01)
- Jiří Vaďura (2001–02)
- Bohumil Páník (2002)
- Jiří Kotrba (Nov 2002)
- Petr Uličný (2003 – 2006)
- Vlastimil Palička (June 2006 – Aug 2006)
- Vlastimil Petržela (Aug 2006 – June 2007)
- Martin Pulpit (2007–08)
- Jiří Fryš (2008)
- Zdeněk Psotka (July 2008 – Dec 2011)
- Petr Uličný (2011–12)
- Roman Pivarník (July 2012 – May 2013)
- Martin Kotůlek (May 2013)
- Zdeněk Psotka (2013–14)
- Ladislav Minář (2014)
- Leoš Kalvoda (2014–15)
- Václav Jílek (2015–19)
- Radoslav Látal (2019–21)
- Václav Jílek (2021–24)
- Jiří Saňák (caretaker) (Feb 2024 – May 2024)
- Tomáš Janotka (May 2024 – April 2026)
- Pavel Hapal (April 2026 – November 2026)
- Jaime Monroy (November 2026 – present)

== History in domestic competitions ==
- 1984–93 Czechoslovak First League
- 1993–14 Czech First League
- 2014–15 Czech National Football League
- 2015–16 Czech First League

- Seasons spent at Level 1 of the football league system: 30
- Seasons spent at Level 2 of the football league system: 2

=== Czech Republic ===
Season	League	Placed	Pld	W	D	L	GF	GA	GD	Pts	Cup
1993–94	1. liga	7th	30	11	13	6	33	31	+2	35 (Note: Two points for a win in 1993–94.)	Quarter-finals
1994–95	1. liga	8th	30	12	7	11	31	31	0	43	Round of 16
1995–96	1. liga	2nd	30	19	4	7	54	33	+21	61	Round of 16
1996–97	1. liga	8th	30	10	10	10	36	30	+6	40	Semi-finals
1997–98	1. liga	3rd	30	16	7	7	38	21	+17	55	Round of 64
1998–99	1. liga	4th	30	12	11	7	42	34	+8	47	Quarter-finals
1999–00	1. liga	12th	30	7	13	10	31	38	–7	34	Semi-finals
2000–01	1. liga	3rd	30	14	10	6	47	33	+14	52	Round of 64
2001–02	1. liga	10th	30	9	10	11	29	31	–2	37	Round of 16
2002–03	1. liga	11th	30	8	10	12	29	33	–4	34	Round of 16
2003–04	1. liga	3rd	30	16	7	7	43	24	+19	55	Round of 32
2004–05	1. liga	4th	30	15	6	9	39	34	+5	51	Round of 64
2005–06	1. liga	9th	30	10	7	13	34	44	–10	37	Round of 64
2006–07	1. liga	14th	30	6	8	16	29	43	–14	26	Round of 32
2007–08	1. liga	11th	30	8	12	10	20	26	–6	36	Round of 64
2008–09	1. liga	4th	30	13	9	8	39	36	+3	48	Round of 16
2009–10	1. liga	6th	30	14	5	11	49	36	+13	47	Semi-finals
2010–11	1. liga	4th	30	14	5	11	47	29	+18	47	Runners-up
2011–12	1. liga	11th	30	11	10	9	42	38	+4	34 (Note: 9 points deducted.)	Winners
2012–13	1. liga	5th	30	13	8	9	38	29	+9	47	Quarter-finals
2013–14	1. liga	15th	30	7	8	15	42	60	−18	29	Round of 16
2014–15	2. liga	1st	30	19	6	5	64	25	+39	63	Round of 32
2015–16	1. liga	15th	30	6	9	15	35	49	−14	27	Quarter-finals
2016–17	2. liga	1st	30	21	6	3	59	22	+37	69	Round of 32
2017–18	1. liga	4th	30	15	10	5	41	22	+19	55	Round of 16
2018–19	1. liga	9th	32	13	4	15	40	46	–6	43	Quarter-finals
2019–20	1. liga	11th	33	9	13	11	39	40	–1	40	Semi-finals
2020–21	1. liga	9th	34	11	12	11	40	40	0	45	Quarter-finals
2021–22	1. liga	8th	34	11	11	12	45	41	+4	44	Quarter-finals
2022–23	1. liga	6th	35	12	12	11	53	47	+6	48	Round of 16
2023–24	1. liga	10th	32	10	7	15	42	51	–9	37	Round of 16
2024–25	1. liga	6th	35	12	9	14	48	53	–5	45	Winners
2025–26	1. liga	7th	34	15	7	12	45	38	+7	52	Round of 32
2026–27	1. liga										Round of 32

== European record ==
=== Overall record ===
Accurate as of 19 March 2026

Competition	Played	Won	Drew	Lost	GF	GA	GD	Win%
UEFA Cup / UEFA Europa League	46	20	9	17	65	64	+1	43.48
UEFA Conference League	10	3	3	4	10	13	−3	30.00
UEFA Intertoto Cup	16	6	6	4	23	16	+7	37.50
Total	72	29	18	25	98	93	+5	40.28

Legend: GF = Goals For. GA = Goals Against. GD = Goal Difference.

Season	Tournament	Round	Country	Club	Home	Away	Aggregate
1986–87	UEFA Cup	1R	(Sweden)	IFK Göteborg	1–1	0–4	1–5
1991–92	UEFA Cup	1R	(Northern Ireland)	Bangor	3–0	3–0	6–0
1991–92	UEFA Cup	2R	(Soviet Union)	Torpedo Moscow	2–0	0–0	2–0
1991–92	UEFA Cup	3R	(Germany)	Hamburger SV	4–1	2–1	6–2
1991–92	UEFA Cup	Quarter-final	(Spain)	Real Madrid	1–1	0–1	1–2
1992–93	UEFA Cup	1R	(Romania)	Universitatea Craiova	1–0	2–1	3–1
1992–93	UEFA Cup	2R	(Turkey)	Fenerbahçe	7–1	0–1	7–2
1992–93	UEFA Cup	3R	(Italy)	Juventus	1–2	0–5	1–7
1996–97	UEFA Cup	1R	(Poland)	Hutnik Kraków	1–0	1–3	2–3
1998–99	UEFA Cup	Q2	(Scotland)	Kilmarnock	2–0	2–0	4–0
1998–99	UEFA Cup	1R	(France)	Marseille	2–2	0–4	2–6
1999–00	UEFA Cup	1R	(Moldova)	Sheriff Tiraspol	0–0	1–1	1–1 (a)
1999–00	UEFA Cup	2R	(Spain)	Real Mallorca	1–3	0–0	1–3
2000–01	Intertoto Cup	1R	(Armenia)	Araks Ararat	1–0	2–1	3–1
2000–01	Intertoto Cup	2R	(Bulgaria)	Velbazhd Kyustendil	8–0	0–2	8–2
2000–01	Intertoto Cup	3R	(Croatia)	Slaven Belupo	2–0	1–1	3–1
2000–01	Intertoto Cup	Semi-final	(Czech Republic)	Chmel Blšany	3–1	0–0	3–1
2000–01	Intertoto Cup	Final	(Italy)	Udinese	2–2	2–4 (a.e.t.)	4–6
2001–02	UEFA Cup	1R	(Spain)	Celta de Vigo	4–3	0–4	4–7
2002–03	UEFA Cup	QR	(Bosnia and Herzegovina)	Sarajevo	2–1	1–2	3–3 (3–5 p)
2004–05	UEFA Cup	QR	(Moldova)	Nistru Otaci	4–0	2–1	6–1
2004–05	UEFA Cup	1R	(Spain)	Real Zaragoza	2–3	0–1	2–4
2005–06	Intertoto Cup	2R	(Poland)	Pogoń Szczecin	1–0	0–0	1–0
2005–06	Intertoto Cup	3R	(Germany)	Borussia Dortmund	0–0	1–1	1–1 (a)
2005–06	Intertoto Cup	Semi-final	(Germany)	Hamburger SV	0–1	0–3	0–4
2009–10	UEFA Europa League	Q2	(Iceland)	Fram	1–1	2–0	3–1
2009–10	UEFA Europa League	Q3	(Scotland)	Aberdeen	3–0	5–1	8–1
2009–10	UEFA Europa League	PO	(England)	Everton	1–1	0–4	1–5
2018–19	UEFA Europa League	Q3	(Kazakhstan)	Kairat	2–0	2–1	4–1
2018–19	UEFA Europa League	PO	(Spain)	Sevilla	0–1	0–3	0–4
2025–26	UEFA Europa League	PO	(Sweden)	Malmö FF	0–2	0–3	0–5
2025–26	UEFA Conference League	LP	(Italy)	Fiorentina	—N/a	0–2	24th
2025–26	UEFA Conference League	LP	(Poland)	Raków Częstochowa	1–1	—N/a	24th
2025–26	UEFA Conference League	LP	(Armenia)	Noah	—N/a	2–1	24th
2025–26	UEFA Conference League	LP	(Slovenia)	Celje	2–1	—N/a	24th
2025–26	UEFA Conference League	LP	(Gibraltar)	Lincoln Red Imps	—N/a	1–2	24th
2025–26	UEFA Conference League	LP	(Poland)	Lech Poznań	1–2	—N/a	24th
2025–26	UEFA Conference League	KPO	(Switzerland)	Lausanne-Sport	1–1	2–1	3–2
2025–26	UEFA Conference League	R16	(Germany)	Mainz 05	0–0	0–2	0–2

== Honours ==
- Czech Cup
  - Winners: 2011–12, 2024–25
- Czech Supercup
  - Winners: 2012
- 2. Liga
  - Winners: 2014–15, 2016–17

== Club records ==
=== Czech First League records ===
- Best position: 2nd (1995–96)
- Worst position: 15th (2013–14, 2015–16)
- Biggest home win: Olomouc 6–0 Teplice (2014–15)
- Biggest away win: Liberec 0–4 Olomouc (2009–10), Plzeň 0–4 Olomouc (2011–12), Mladá Boleslav 0–4 Olomouc (2018–19), Dukla 0–4 Olomouc (2018–19)
- Biggest home defeat: Olomouc 0–5 Slavia (2024–25)
- Biggest away defeat: Sparta 6–0 Olomouc (1999–2000)
