= List of football clubs in the Czech Republic =

This is a list of teams in the football leagues in the Czech Republic, as of the 2026–27 season.

Location of Czech professional football clubs (1st and 2nd tier)

== First level – Czech First League ==
- AC Sparta Prague
- SK Slavia Prague
- FC Viktoria Plzeň
- FC Hradec Králové
- FK Jablonec
- SK Sigma Olomouc
- FC Baník Ostrava
- FC Slovan Liberec
- FK Mladá Boleslav
- FK Teplice
- 1. FC Slovácko, Uherské Hradiště
- Bohemians 1905, Prague
- FC Zlín
- FK Pardubice
- FC Zbrojovka Brno
- SK Artis Brno

== Second level – Czech National Football League ==
- MFK Karviná
- FK Dukla Prague
- SFC Opava
- FC Vysočina Jihlava
- FC Silon Táborsko, Tábor
- FK Ústí nad Labem
- FK Příbram
- FC Sellier & Bellot Vlašim
- FK Viktoria Žižkov, Prague
- 1. SK Prostějov
- SK Hanácká Slavia Kroměříž
- SK Kladno
- FK Fotbal Třinec
- FK Arsenal Česká Lípa
- SK Slavia Praha B
- FC Baník Ostrava B

== Third level ==
=== Bohemian Football League ===
==== Group A ====
- SK Dynamo České Budějovice
- TJ Jiskra Domažlice
- FC Písek
- FK Motorlet Prague
- FK Loko Prague
- FK Králův Dvůr
- SK Benešov
- Povltavská FA, Štěchovice
- FK Admira Prague
- SK Aritma Prague
- AC Sparta Prague B
- FC Viktoria Plzeň B
- Bohemians 1905 B, Prague
- FK Dukla Prague B
- FK Příbram B
- SK Slavia Praha C

==== Group B ====
- MFK Chrudim
- FK Varnsdorf
- FK Baník Most-Souš
- SK Sokol Brozany
- SK Zápy
- FK Čáslav
- SK Benátky nad Jizerou
- FK Neratovice-Byškovice
- SK FK Velké Hamry z.s.
- FK Horní Ředice
- FK Jablonec B
- FK Mladá Boleslav B
- FK Teplice B
- FC Hradec Králové B
- FC Slovan Liberec B
- FK Pardubice B

=== Moravian-Silesian Football League ===
- FK Frýdek-Místek
- SK Uničov
- FK Hodonín
- FK Blansko
- TJ Unie Hlubina, Ostrava
- MFK Vítkovice
- FC Vsetín
- SFK Nové Město na Moravě
- SK Hranice
- MFK Havířov
- ČSK Uherský Brod
- FK SK Polanka, Ostrava
- FC Zbrojovka Brno B
- SK Sigma Olomouc B
- FC Fastav Zlín B
- 1. FC Slovácko B, Uherské Hradiště
- MFK Karviná B
- SK Artis Brno B

== Fourth level – Czech Fourth Division ==
=== Group A ===
- TJ Spartak Soběslav
- FK Komárov
- SK Senco Doubravka, Plzeň
- FC Rokycany
- SK Hořovice
- SK Petřín Plzeň
- TJ Hluboká nad Vltavou
- SK Strakonice 1908
- FK Slavoj Český Krumlov
- FC Křimice
- FC ZVVZ Milevsko
- FK Okula Nýrsko
- SK Spartak Příbram
- SK Dynamo České Budějovice B
- FC Silon Táborsko B
- TJ Jiskra Domažlice B

=== Group B ===
- FC Chomutov
- FK Ostrov
- FC Slavia Karlovy Vary
- FK Meteor Prague VIII
- SK Slaný
- SK Štětí
- FC Tempo Prague
- FK Baník Sokolov
- SK Rapid Psáry
- SK Újezd Praha 4, Prague
- Sokol Hostouň
- FK Hvězda Cheb
- FK Brandýs nad Labem
- TJ Slovan Velvary
- FK Slavoj Vyšehrad, Prague
- FK Ústí nad Labem, Youth

=== Group C ===
- MFK Trutnov
- SK Vysoké Mýto
- SK Sparta Kolín
- FK Turnov
- FK Chlumec nad Cidlinou
- TJ Svitavy
- SK Kosmonosy
- Spartak Police nad Metují
- FC Hlinsko
- TJ Dvůr Králové nad Labem
- FC Slavia Hradec Králové
- Jiskra Ústí nad Orlicí
- FK Přepeře
- FK Letohrad
- Čechie Vykáň
- MFK Chrudim B

=== Group D ===
- 1. SC Znojmo FK
- FC PBS Velká Bíteš
- FC Žďár nad Sázavou
- FC Kuřim
- FC Slovan Havlíčkův Brod
- FK Maraton Pelhřimov
- FC Sparta Brno
- FC Velké Meziříčí
- FC Chotěboř
- TJ Tatran Bohunice, Brno
- Tatran Ždírec nad Doubravou
- AFC Humpolec
- TJ Sokol Tasovice
- SK Fotbalová škola Třebíč
- FC Dosta Bystrc-Kníničky, Brno
- TJ Sokol Bedřichov, Jihlava

=== Group E ===
- FC Strání
- SFK ELKO Holešov
- TJ Sokol Lanžhot
- MSK Břeclav
- FC Brumov
- Tatran Všechovice
- FK Kozlovice
- FC TVD Slavičín
- Slovan Bzenec
- FK Šternberk
- SK Baťov 1930, Otrokovice
- FK Nové Sady, Olomouc
- Spartak Hluk
- SK Krumvíř
- SK Hanácká Slavia Kroměříž B
- 1. SK Prostějov B

=== Group F ===
- FC Hlučín
- SK Sulko Zábřeh
- FK Šumperk
- TJ Valašské Meziříčí
- SK Stonava
- FK Bospor Bohumín
- FC Bílovec
- SK Jiskra Rýmařov
- FC Vratimov
- TJ Břidličná
- FK Nový Jičín
- 1.BFK Frýdlant nad Ostravicí
- Sport-Club Pustá Polom
- FC Vratimov
- MFK Kravaře
- SFC Opava B

== Fifth level – Regional championship ==
=== Prague (Prague Championship) ===
- FC Přední Kopanina
- SC Radotín
- Spartak Kbely
- Sokol Kolovraty
- FC Zličín
- FK Dukla Jižní Město
- SK Střešovice 1911
- ABC Braník
- SK Praga Vysočany
- AFK Slavoj Podolí Prague
- SK Union Vršovice
- Prague Raptors
- FK Admira Prague B
- FC Tempo Prague B
- SK Aritma Prague B
- FK Motorlet Prague B

=== Central Bohemian Region ===
- SK Český Brod
- Sparta Kutná Hora
- FC Velim
- TJ Sokol Nespeky
- SK Doksy
- SK Posázavan Poříčí nad Sázavou
- SK Poříčany
- TJ Sokol Libiš
- AFK Tuchlovice
- TJ Sokol Tuchoměřice
- FK Bohemia Poděbrady
- FK Kralupy 1901, Kralupy nad Vltavou
- FK Dobrovice
- TJ Viktoria Vestec
- SK Union Čelákovice
- Povltavská FA B, Štěchovice

=== South Bohemian Region ===
- TJ Jiskra Třeboň
- TJ Malše Roudné
- FK Protivín
- FK Olešník
- FC AL-KO Semice
- TJ Dražice
- SK Mirovice
- TJ Osek
- TJ Blaník Strunkovice
- Sokol Sezimovo Ústí
- FK Jindřichův Hradec 1910
- FK Meteor Tábor
- FK Dolní Dvořiště
- FK Spartak Kaplice
- SK Zlatá Koruna
- SK Slavia České Budějovice

=== Plzeň Region ===
- SK Smíchov Plzeň
- FK Tachov
- SK Klatovy 1898
- TJ Přeštice
- Slavoj Mýto
- ZKZ Horní Bříza
- FK Holýšov
- SK Rapid Plzeň
- Slavoj Koloveč
- FC Dynamo Horšovský Týn
- FK Bohemia Kaznějov
- TJ Měcholupy
- TJ Chotěšov
- SK Slavia Vejprnice
- TJ Start Luby
- SK Petřín Plzeň B

=== Karlovy Vary Region ===
- TJ Karlovy Vary-Dvory
- FC Cheb
- FC Viktoria Mariánské Lázně
- Baník Královské Poříčí
- Baník Union Nové Sedlo
- Spartak Horní Slavkov
- TJ Olympie Hroznětín
- FC Františkovy Lázně
- FC Rozvoj Trstěnice
- FK Skalná
- SK Toužim
- FK Baník Sokolov B
- FC Slavia Karlovy Vary B
- FK Ostrov B

=== Ústí nad Labem Region ===
- FK Litoměřicko, Litoměřice
- TJ Proboštov
- FK Klášterec nad Ohří
- FK Český Lev Neštěmice
- TJ Oldřichov
- TJ Baník Modlany
- Sokol Srbice
- FK Slavoj Žatec
- SK Černovice
- FK Dobroměřice
- FK Bílina
- FK Junior Děčín
- Sokol Horní Jiřetín
- FK SEKO Louny
- SK Viktorie Ledvice
- FK Baník Most-Souš B

=== Liberec Region ===
- FK Sedmihorky
- Jiskra Višňová
- FC Nový Bor
- SK Semily
- FK ŽBS Železný Brod
- TJ Spartak Chrastava
- FK Stráž pod Ralskem
- FC Pěnčín
- FC Lomnice nad Popelkou
- SK Stap-Tratec Vilémov
- TJ Sokol Pěnčín
- SK Šluknov
- SK Slovan Hrádek nad Nisou
- SK Jívan Bělá, Jilemnice
- TJ Sokol Rozstání
- FK Arsenal Česká Lípa B

=== Hradec Králové Region ===
- FK Náchod
- TJ Sokol Třebeš, Hradec Králové
- RMSK Cidlina Nový Bydžov
- SK Dobruška
- Spartak Rychnov nad Kněžnou
- SK Libčany
- SK Jičín
- FK Jaroměř
- FC Vrchlabí
- SK Týniště nad Orlicí
- TJ Sokol Železnice
- TJ Lázně Bělohrad
- SK Jiskra Hořice
- SK Česká Skalice
- TJ Sokol Roudnice
- FK Chlumec nad Cidlinou B

=== Pardubice Region ===
- SK Holice
- FK Spartak Choceň
- FK Česká Třebová
- TJ Lanškroun
- SK Pardubičky, Pardubice
- FK Jiskra Heřmanův Městec
- SK Sokol Prosetín
- FK Přelouč
- Slovan Moravská Třebová
- FC Skuteč
- SK Rozhovice
- Sokol Dolní Újezd
- TJ Přelovice
- SK Vysoké Mýto B
- TJ Svitavy B
- Jiskra Ústí nad Orlicí B

=== Vysočina Region ===
- Slavoj Polná
- FSC Stará Říše
- SK Huhtamaki Okříšky
- SK Bystřice nad Pernštejnem
- Slovan Kamenice nad Lipou
- FK Kovofiniš Ledeč nad Sázavou
- FC Slavoj Žirovnice
- SK Buwol Metal Luka nad Jihlavou
- Sokol Šebkovice
- TJ Nová Ves
- TJ Dálnice Speřice
- 1.FC Jemnicko, Jemnice
- FC Slovan Havlíčkův Brod B
- FC Žďár nad Sázavou B

=== South Moravian Region ===
- FC Boskovice-Letovice
- FK Baník Ratíškovice
- TJ Tatran Rousínov
- FK SK Bosonohy, Brno
- SK Olympia Ráječko
- FK Kunštát
- SK Cézava, Rajhradice
- FC Slovan Rosice
- AFK Tišnov
- FC Moravský Krumlov
- FC Ivančice
- Tatran Kohoutovice, Brno
- TJ Moravan Lednice
- SK Moravské Knínice
- TJ Slavoj Rohatec
- TJ Sokol Dobšice

=== Olomouc Region ===
- 1.HFK Olomouc
- FK Mohelnice
- FK Velká Bystřice
- FC Želatovice
- 1.FC Viktorie Přerov
- FK Jeseník
- TJ Postřelmov
- TJ Jiskra Rapotín
- TJ Sokol Bělotín
- FK Brodek u Přerova
- TJ Tatran Litovel
- TJ Sokol Velké Losiny
- FK Slavonín
- 1. FC Olešnice u Bouzova
- SK Loštice 1923
- SK Uničov B

=== Zlín Region ===
- FC Slušovice
- FC V. Karlovice+Karolinka
- FK Luhačovice
- FC Morkovice
- TJ Sokol Nevšová
- TJ Štítná nad Vláří
- TJ Osvětimany
- FK Kunovice
- TJ Nivnice
- Jiskra Staré Město
- TJ Sokol Horní Bečva
- FS Napajedla
- FK Vigantice
- FK Mladcová

=== Moravian-Silesian Region ===
- FK Český Těšín
- SK Brušperk
- FC Heřmanice Slezská (Ostrava)
- TJ Háj ve Slezsku
- SK Beskyd Frenštát pod Radhoštěm
- TJ Sokol Kobeřice
- FC Vřesina
- TJ Tatran Jakubčovice
- FK Slavia Orlová-Lutyně
- První SC Staré Město
- FK Město Albrechtice
- FK Baník Albrechtice
- FK Krnov
- Lokomotiva Petrovice
- TJ Sokol Koblov
- MFK Vítkovice B

== Other active clubs ==
Club	Level
SK Union Vršovice	6
Sokol Cholupice	6
SK Dolní Kounice	10
FK Drnovice	8
SK Sparta Krč	6
Slavia Louňovice	8
FC Ostrava-Jih	7
TJ Sokol Protivanov	8
ČAFC Židenice	9
AFK Union Žižkov	7
