= 2012–13 Czech Cup =

Pohár ČMFS
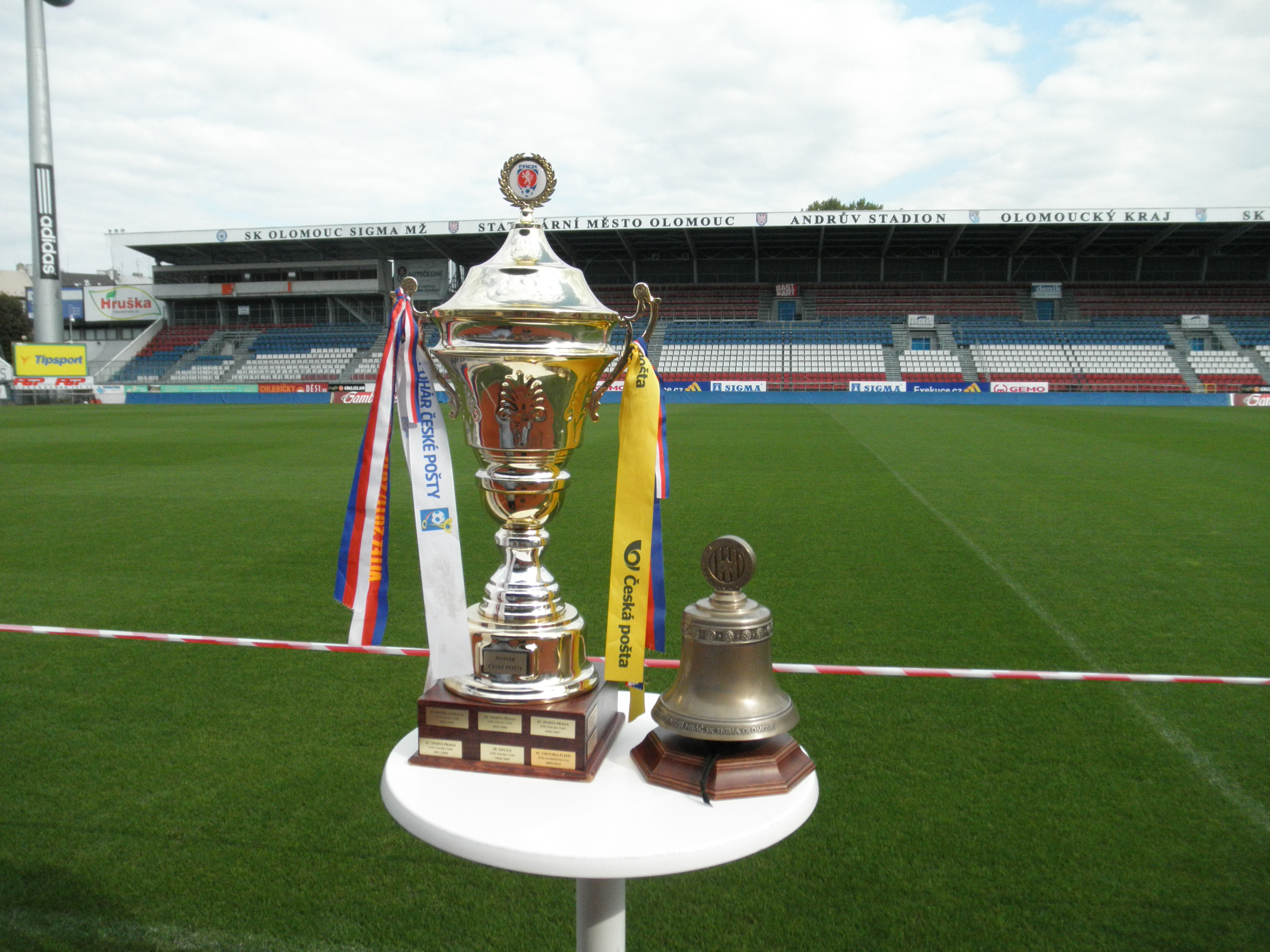
- Czech Republic Football Cup

Tournament details
- Country: Czech Republic
- Teams: 134

Final positions
- Champions: FK Baumit Jablonec
- Runners-up: FK Mladá Boleslav

Tournament statistics
- Top goal scorer: Ondřej Vaněk (8 goals)

The 2012–13 Czech Cup was the 20th edition of the annual football knock-out tournament organized by the Czech Football Association of the Czech Republic. It began on 22 July 2012 with the preliminary round and ended with the final on 18 May 2013.

FK Baumit Jablonec prevailed at the 17 May 2013 Cup and qualified for the 2013–14 UEFA Europa League.

== Teams ==
| Round | Clubs remaining | Clubs involved | Winners from previous round | New entries this round | Leagues entering at this round |
|---|---|---|---|---|---|
| Preliminary round | 134 | 60 | none | 60 | Levels 4 and 5 in football league pyramid |
| First round | 104 | 88 | 30 | 58 | Czech 2. Liga; Bohemian Football League; Moravian-Silesian Football League; Czech Fourth Division |
| Second round | 60 | 56 | 44 | 12 | Czech First League |
| Third round | 32 | 32 | 28 | 4 | none |
| Fourth round | 16 | 16 | 16 | none | none |
| Quarter-finals | 8 | 8 | 8 | none | none |
| Semi-finals | 4 | 4 | 4 | none | none |
| Final | 2 | 2 | 2 | none | none |

== Preliminary round ==
The Preliminary round was played on 22 July 2012.

| Team 1 | Score | Team 2 |
|---|---|---|
| Uhříněves | 1–0 | Český Brod |
| Dobřichovice | 1–0 | Štěchovice |
| Bavorovice | 0–1 | Český Krumlov |
| Ostrov | 1–5 | Tachov |
| Toužim | 2–3 | Chrást |
| Litvínov | 3–1 | Souš |
| Jablonec n.J. | 1–1; 4-3 pen | Mšeno |
| Česká Skalice | 0–4 | Náchod |
| Dobrovice | 0–2 | Admira Prague |
| Nové Strašecí | 5–0 | Přední Kopanina |
| Aritma Prague | 2–3 | Litol |
| Libiš | 0–2 | Brozany |
| Doubravka | 2–1 | Hořovicko |
| Lovosice | 1–1; 4-2 pen | Žatec |
| Vyšehrad | 2–1 | Benešov |
| Semily | 0–2 | Nový Bydžov |
| Ústí n.O. | 1–2 | Holice |
| Dvůr Králové | 4–0 | Nová Paka |
| Mutěnice | 7–0 | Spytihněv |
| Slavičín | 6–1 | Valašské Meziříčí |
| Dolany | 0–7 | Hranice |
| Nový Jičín | 1–1; 3-1 pen | Lískovec |
| Kozmice | 0–2 | Havířov |
| Morkovice | 1–3 | Otrokovice |
| Přerov | 2–3 | Vyškov |
| Hodonín | 1–1; 2-4 pen | Brno Bohunice |
| Bystrc | 0–0; 5-3 pen | Tasovice |
| Třebíč | 1–0 | Vrchovina |
| Šumperk | 0–2 | Mikulovice |
| Pelhřimov | 1–3 | Líšeň |

== First round ==
The First round was played on 29 July 2012.

| Team 1 | Score | Team 2 |
|---|---|---|
| Čechie Uhříněves | 0–3 | FK Kolín |
| Dobřichovice | 1–3 | Králův Dvůr |
| Český Krumlov | 0–4 | Strakonice |
| Tachov | 1–3 | Domažlice |
| Chrást | 1–2 | 1. FC Karlovy Vary |
| Litvínov | 0–1 | Vilémov |
| Jablonec n.J. | 1–1; 4–3 pen | Hlavice |
| Náchod | 0–7 | Pardubice |
| Admira Prague | 1–4 | Loko Vltavín |
| Nové Strašecí | 0–0; 4–3 pen | Kladno |
| Litol | 1–4 | Bohemians Prague |
| Brozany | 0–2 | Most |
| Doubravka | 1–6 | Písek |
| Lovosice | 0–7 | Ústí n.Labem |
| Vyšehrad | 5–1 | Rokycany |
| Nový Bydžov | 1–5 | Viktoria Žižkov |
| Holice | 0–2 | Kutná Hora |
| Dvůr Králové | 2–1 | Převýšov |
| Zápy | 1–3 | Bohemians 1905 |
| Meteor Prague | 2–2; 4–3 pen | Roudnice n.L. |
| Neratovice | 0–2 | Chomutov |
| Kunice | 1–2 | Táborsko |
| Letohrad | 0–1 | Čáslav |
| Chrudim | 1–2 | Vlašim |
| Nový Bor | 0–1 | FK Varnsdorf |
| Pěnčín-Turnov | 0–2 | Arsenal Česká Lípa |
| Horní Měcholupy | 0–0; 5–4 pen | FK Baník Sokolov |
| Svitavy | 4–0 | Žďár |
| Mutěnice | 0–4 | Zlín |
| Slavičín | 1–4 | Opava |
| Hranice | 0–8 | Uničov |
| Nový Jičín | 2–2; 2–4 pen | FC Hlučín |
| Havířov | 0–5 | Třinec |
| Otrokovice | 0–3 | MFK OKD Karviná |
| Vyškov | 1–3 | Břeclav |
| Brno-Bohunice | 1–3 | Prostějov |
| Bystrc | 1–2 | Kroměříž |
| Třebíč | 2–0 | Polná |
| Mohelnice | 1–2 | Zábřeh |
| Rosice | 4–1 | Hulín |
| Mikulovice | 0–3 | 1. HFK Olomouc |
| Brumov | 1–1; 4–3 pen | Orlová |
| Líšeň | 0–0; 3–4 pen | Znojmo |
| Petrovice | 1–1; 2–4 pen | Frýdek Místek |

== Second round ==
12 teams from the Czech First League enter at this stage. The second round was played on 29 August 2012.

| Team 1 | Score | Team 2 |
|---|---|---|
| Arsenal Česká Lípa | 2–0 | FK Varnsdorf |
| Rosice | 2–1 | FC Zbrojovka Brno |
| Jablonec n.J. | 3–1 | Vilémov |
| Horní Měcholupy | 1–3 | FK Teplice |
| Vyšehrad | 2–0 | Písek |
| Domažlice | 1–1; 5–4 pen | SK D.Č.Budějovice |
| Vlašim | 0–1 | Pardubice |
| Kutná Hora | 0–1 | SK Slavia Prague |
| Ústí n.Labem | 2–0 | Most |
| Loko Vltavín | 0–3 | FK Baumit Jablonec |
| Meteor Prague | 3–1 | Bohemians 1905 |
| Dvůr Králové | 1–4 | FC Hradec Králové |
| Strakonice | 1–1; 1–4 pen | Bohemians Prague |
| Nové Strašecí | 0–1 | Chomutov |
| Čáslav | 1–1; 5–4 pen | Táborsko |
| FC Hlučín | 1–1; 3–4 pen | Třinec |
| MFK OKD Karviná | 1–2 | FC Baník Ostrava |
| Kroměříž | 2–0 | Břeclav |
| Brumov | 3–5 | 1. FC Slovácko |
| Třebíč | 0–0; 7–6 pen | Znojmo |
| Králův Dvůr | 2–1 | 1. FK Příbram |
| Zábřeh | 1–1; 8–9 pen | 1. HFK Olomouc |
| FK Kolín | 0–1 | FK Dukla Prague |
| Uničov | 3–3; 5–3 pen | Opava |
| Prostějov | 1–4 | SK Sigma Olomouc |
| Frýdek Místek | 0–1 | Zlín |
| Svitavy | 1–2 | FC Vysočina Jihlava |
| 1. FC Karlovy Vary | 0–0; 1–3 pen | Viktoria Žižkov |

== Third round ==
The top four teams from last season's Czech First League enter at this stage. The third round was scheduled to be played on 26 September 2012.

| Team 1 | Score | Team 2 |
|---|---|---|
| Arsenal Česká Lípa | 0–0; 2–4 pen | FC Slovan Liberec |
| Jablonec n.J. | 2–2; 1–3 pen | Rosice |
| Vyšehrad | 0–7 | FK Teplice |
| Domažlice | 2–0 | Pardubice |
| Ústí n.Labem | 2–2; 5–4 pen | SK Slavia Prague |
| Meteor Prague | 0–6 | FK Baumit Jablonec |
| Bohemians Prague | 0–1 | FC Hradec Králové |
| Chomutov | 2–3 | FC Viktoria Plzeň |
| Čáslav | 1–1; 3–4 pen | FK Mladá Boleslav |
| Třinec | 1–0 | FC Baník Ostrava |
| Kroměříž | 0–4 | 1. FC Slovácko |
| Třebíč | 1–1; 3–1 pen | Králův Dvůr |
| 1. HFK Olomouc | 2–2; 3–4 pen | FK Dukla Prague |
| Uničov | 0–3 | SK Sigma Olomouc |
| Zlín | 2–2; 4–5 pen | FC Vysočina Jihlava |
| Viktoria Žižkov | 1–1; 3–4 pen | AC Sparta Prague |

== Fourth round ==
The fourth round was scheduled to be played on 31 October and 28 November 2012.

| Team 1 | Agg. | Team 2 | 1st leg | 2nd leg |
|---|---|---|---|---|
| Rosice | 1–7 | FC Slovan Liberec | 1–4 | 0–3 |
| Domažlice | 1–4 | FK Teplice | 0–2 | 1–2 |
| Ústí n.Labem | 1–12 | FK Baumit Jablonec | 1–7 | 0–5 |
| FC Hradec Králové | 2–2 (a) | FC Viktoria Plzeň | 2–1 | 0–1 |
| Třinec | 1–4 | FK Mladá Boleslav | 1–1 | 0–3 |
| Třebíč | 0–4 | 1. FC Slovácko | 0–2 | 0–2 |
| FK Dukla Prague | 2–3 | SK Sigma Olomouc | 0–1 | 2–2 |
| FC Vysočina Jihlava | 2–2; 2–3 pen | AC Sparta Prague | 1–1 | 1–1 |

== Quarter-finals ==
The quarter-finals are scheduled for 2 and 9 April 2013.

| Team 1 | Agg. | Team 2 | 1st leg | 2nd leg |
|---|---|---|---|---|
| FC Slovan Liberec | 4–2 | FK Teplice | 2–0 | 2–2 |
| FK Baumit Jablonec | 6–4 | FC Viktoria Plzeň | 2–1 | 4–3 |
| FK Mladá Boleslav | 4–1 | 1. FC Slovácko | 3–1 | 1–0 |
| SK Sigma Olomouc | 4–8 | AC Sparta Prague | 2–4 | 2–4 |

=== First leg ===
| 2 April 2013 | FK Mladá Boleslav | 3–1 | 1. FC Slovácko | Mladá Boleslav |
| 15:00 | Šćuk 43'; Johana 88'; Dosoudil 90+2' | Report | Trousil 39' | Stadium: Městský stadion Attendance: 350; Referee: Ondřej Lerch |

| 3 April 2013 | FK Baumit Jablonec | 2–1 | FC Viktoria Plzeň | Jablonec nad Nisou |
| 15:30 | Piták 61', 75' (pen.) | Report | Čišovský 6' | Stadium: Chance Arena; Attendance: 1,235; Referee: Libor Kovarik |

| 3 April 2013 | SK Sigma Olomouc | 2–4 | AC Sparta Prague | Olomouc |
| 17:00 | Navrátil 72'; Varadi 86' | Report | Kadlec 60', 66'; Kweuke 64'; Hušbauer 79' | Stadium: Andrův stadion Attendance: 3,213; Referee: Miroslav Zelinka |

| 3 April 2013 | FC Slovan Liberec | 2–0 | FK Teplice | Liberec |
| 17:00 | Rabušic 24'; Delarge 31' | Report | | Stadium: Stadion u Nisy; Attendance: 1,255; Referee: Drahoslav Drábek |

=== Second leg ===
| 10 April 2013 | 1. FC Slovácko | 0–1 (1–4 agg.) | FK Mladá Boleslav | Uherské Hradiště |
| 17:00 | | Report | Mareš 23' | Stadium: Městský fotbalový stadion Attendance: 1,248; Referee: Jiří Jech |

| 10 April 2013 | FC Viktoria Plzeň | 3–4 (4–6 agg.) | FK Baumit Jablonec | Plzeň |
| 17:00 | Daniel Rossi 72' (o.g.); Darida 73'; Zeman 87' | Report | Novák 4'; Vaněk 6', 53', 71' | Stadium: Štruncovy Sady; Attendance: 2,035; Referee: Zbynek Proske |

| 16 April 2013 | FK Teplice | 2–2 (2–4 agg.) | FC Slovan Liberec | Teplice |
| 16:30 | Chovanec 6'; Vůch 70' | Report | Delarge 37'; Pavelka 79' | Stadium: Na Stínadlech; Attendance: 915; Referee: Pavel Orel |

| 16 April 2013 | AC Sparta Prague | 4–2 (8–4 agg.) | SK Sigma Olomouc | Prague |
| 20:15 | Kadeřábek 7'; Kweuke 49', 70'; Jánoš 88' | Report | Navrátil 48'; Škerle 90' | Stadium: Generali Arena; Attendance: 3,106; Referee: Radek Příhoda |

== Semi-finals ==
The first legs of the semi-finals were played on 24 April and 1 May 2013, and the second legs were played on 8 May 2013.

| Team 1 | Agg. | Team 2 | 1st leg | 2nd leg |
|---|---|---|---|---|
| FC Slovan Liberec | 4–5 | FK Baumit Jablonec | 4–3 | 0–2 |
| FK Mladá Boleslav | 3–2 | AC Sparta Prague | 1–1 | 2–1 |

=== First leg ===
| 24 April 2013 | FC Slovan Liberec | 4–3 | FK Baumit Jablonec | Liberec |
| 19:30 | Štajner 37' (pen.), 38', 59'; Delarge 63' | Report | Vaněk 11', 58'; Třešňák 67' | Stadium: Stadion u Nisy; Attendance: 4,786; Referee: Pavel Franek |

| 1 May 2013 | FK Mladá Boleslav | 1–1 | AC Sparta Prague | Mladá Boleslav |
| 16:00 | Chramosta 73' | Report | Krejčí 53' | Stadium: Městský stadion Attendance: 4,477; Referee: Tomas Kocourek |

=== Second leg ===
| 8 May 2013 | FK Baumit Jablonec | 2–0 (5–4 agg.) | FC Slovan Liberec | Jablonec nad Nisou |
| 17:15 | Hubník 52'; Piták 63' | Report | | Stadium: Chance Arena; Attendance: 5,470; Referee: Michal Paták |

| 8 May 2013 | AC Sparta Prague | 1–2 (2–3 agg.) | FK Mladá Boleslav | Prague |
| 17:10 | Jarošík 2' | Report | Bořil 59'; Chramosta 69' | Stadium: Generali Arena; Attendance: 1,825; Referee: Jaroslav Bilek |

== Final ==
The final was played on 17 May 2013 in Chomutov.

| 17 May 2013 | FK Baumit Jablonec | 2−2 (a.e.t.) (5–4 p) | FK Mladá Boleslav | Chomutov |
| 20:15 | Hubník 19'; Kopic 83' | | Zahustel 29'; Chramosta 45' | Stadium: Letní stadion Attendance: 3,000; Referee: Radek Příhoda |
| | Penalties |
| | Piták (penalty missed); Loučka (penalty scored); Novák (penalty scored); Daniel Rossi (penalty scored); Vaněk (penalty scored); Kopic (penalty scored) | | (penalty missed) Ondřejka; (penalty scored) Jarolím; (penalty scored) Šćuk; (penalty scored) Bořil; (penalty scored) Chramosta; (penalty missed) Johana |

== See also ==
- 2012–13 Czech First League
- 2012–13 Czech 2. Liga
