= 2014–15 Czech Cup =

Pohár české pošty

Tournament details
- Country: Czech Republic
- Teams: 130

Final positions
- Champions: Slovan Liberec
- Runners-up: Baumit Jablonec

Tournament statistics
- Top goal scorer: Roman Potočný (5 goals)

The 2014–15 Czech Cup, known as the Česká Pošta Cup (Czech: Pohár české pošty) for sponsorship reasons, is the 22nd season of the annual knockout football tournament of the Czech Republic. It began with the preliminary round on 20 July 2014 and end with the final on 26 May 2015. The winner of the cup will gain the right to play in the third qualifying round of the 2015–16 UEFA Europa League.

== Preliminary round ==
The preliminary round ties are scheduled for 20 July 2014. 52 teams compete in this round, all from level 4 or below of the Czech league system.

Team 1	Score	Team 2
19 July 2014
Aritma Praha (4)	2–2 (4–3 p)	Baník Souš (4)
Spartak Chrastava (5)	4–1	Vilémov (5)
Litoměřice (4)	2–0	Nový Bor (4)
Uherský Brod (4)	0–1	Slavičín (4)
20 July 2014
Slavoj Koloveč (5)	1–3	Sušice (4)
Háje (5)	0–2	Jíloviště (5)
Dražice (5)	3–0	Slavoj Český Krumlov (4)
Nové Strašecí (4)	1–2	Hořovicko (4)
Neratovice-Byškovice (4)	1–0	Zličín (4)
Krupka (4)	2–2 (3–2 p)	Lovosice (4)
Náchod (4)	1–4	Pěnčín–Turnov (4)
Klatovy (4)	2–1	Rokycany (4)
Slavoj Žatec (4)	2–3	Karlovy Vary (4)
Úvaly (4)	1–3	Dobrovice (4)
Loko Chomutov (4)	1–2	Doubravka (4)
Týniště nad Orlicí (4)	1–3	Trutnov (4)
Tasovice (4)	2–1	Stará Říše (4)
Nesyt Hodonín (4)	1–2	Blansko (4)
Kozlovice (4)	1–0	Viktorie Přerov (4)
Mutěnice (4)	1–2	Břeclav (3)
Frýdlant nad Ostravicí (5)	1–2	Nový Jičín (4)
Jiskra Rýmařov (4)	2–2 (5–3 p)	Mohelnice (4)
Slovan Havlíčkův Brod (4)	1–1 (3–4 p)	Líšeň (3)
Štítná nad Vláří (6)	1–2	Brumov (4)
Velké Karlovice–Karolinka (4)	2–0	Valašské Meziříčí (4)
Nejdek (5)	1–4	Hvězda Cheb (4)

== First round ==
The first round ties are scheduled for 26 July 2014.

Team 1	Score	Team 2
26 July 2014
Neratovice–Byškovice (4)	2–0	Loko Vltavín (3)
Aritma Praha (4)	1–2	Admira Prague (3)
Slavoj Vyšehrad (3)	1–4	MAS Táborsko (2)
Karlovy Vary (4)	0–7	Baník Sokolov (2)
Jíloviště (5)	1–1 (4–2 p)	Meteor Prague VIII (3)
Sokol Brozany (4)	2–1	MSA Dolní Benešov (3)
Hvězda Cheb (4)	0–3	Bohemians Prague (Střížkov) (3)
Hořovicko (4)	0–1	Tachov (4)
Krupka (4)	2–2 (3–4 p)	Chomutov (3)
Sušice (4)	1–5	Jiskra Domažlice (3)
Pěnčín–Turnov (4)	1–1 (2–4 p)	Pardubice (2)
Dobrovice (4)	3–0	Králův Dvůr (3)
Litoměřice (4)	1–4	Ústí nad Labem (2)
Klatovy (4)	0–0 (4–2 p)	Baník Most (2)
Doubravka (4)	0–9	Vlašim (2)
Sparta Kutná Hora (4)	0–7	Viktoria Žižkov (2)
Vysoké Mýto (4)	2–0	OEZ Letohrad (4)
Česká Třebová (4)	0–4	Sokol Živanice (4)
Kladno (4)	3–4	Písek (3)
Český Brod (4)	0–7	Převýšov (3)
Jiskra Ústí nad Orlicí (4)	0–2	Chrudim (3)
Sokol Jablonec nad Jizerou (4)	1–0	Zápy (3)
Olympia Hradec Králové (5)	2–1	Dvůr Králové (4)
Velké Karlovice–Karolinka (4)	0–1	Hanácká Slavia Kroměříž (3)
Hranice (4)	1–1 (4–3 p)	Slavia Orlová (3)
Břeclav (3)	2–3	Velké Meziříčí (4)
Pelhřimov (4)	0–1	Třebíč (3)
MSA Dolní Benešov (4)	1–1 (2–3 p)	Uničov (3)
Jiskra Rýmařov (4)	1–1 (4–5 p)	Sulko Zábřeh (3)
Blansko (4)	0–0 (6–5 p)	HFK Olomouc (3)
Žďár nad Sázavou (4)	1–3	Slovan Rosice (4)
Petrovice (4)	0–1	Hlučín (3)
Vyškov (3)	1–2	SK Prostějov (3)
Nový Jičín (4)	0–1	Opava (2)
Kozlovice (4)	0–2	Karviná (2)
Havířov (4)	1–2	Fotbal Třinec (2)
Tasovice (4)	1–3	Fastav Zlín (2)
Brumov (4)	0–3	Frýdek-Místek (2)
Líšeň (3)	1–3	SC Znojmo (2)
Slavičín (4)	0–6	Sigma Olomouc (2)
27 July 2014
Dražice (5)	1–5	TJ Štěchovice (3)
Trutnov (4)	0–3	Kolín (2)
Spartak Chrastava (5)	0–8	Varnsdorf (2)
29 July
Union 2013 (3)	2–1	Čáslav (3)

== Second round ==
The second round ties are scheduled for 12, 13, 19, 20 August & 2 September 2014.

Team 1	Score	Team 2
12 August 2014
SK Prostějov (3)	1–4	FC Slovácko (1)
Neratovice–Byškovice (4)	0–2	Teplice (1)
Hlučín (3)	1–2	Baník Ostrava (1)
Blansko (4)	1–4	Frýdek-Místek (2)
Písek (3)	0–2	Příbram (1)
13 August 2014
Jíloviště (5)	1–2	TJ Štěchovice (3)
Olympia Hradec Králové (5)	0–6	Hradec Králové (1)
Chrudim (3)	1–3	Slavia Prague (1)
Sokol Jablonec nad Jizerou (4)	2–4	Vlašim (2)
Dobrovice (4)	5–0	Klatovy (4)
Hranice (4)	1–1 (4–5 p)	Opava (2)
Sokol Brozany (4)	2–6	České Budějovice (1)
Sulko Zábřeh (3)	0–2	Karviná (2)
Chomutov (3)	0–5	Baumit Jablonec (1)
Uničov (3)	0–3	Fotbal Třinec (2)
Hanácká Slavia Kroměříž (3)	1–1 (7–8 p)	Fastav Zlín (2)
Třebíč (3)	0–4	Zbrojovka Brno (1)
Převýšov (3)	0–1	Pardubice (2)
Bohemians Prague (Střížkov) (3)	2–0	Varnsdorf (2)
Kolín (2)	0–3	Bohemians 1905 (1)
Admira Prague (3)	0–0 (15–14 p)	Baník Sokolov (2)
Slovan Rosice (4)	1–3	SC Znojmo (2)
Union 2013 (3)	0–2	Ústí nad Labem (2)
Vysoké Mýto (4)	0–4	Sokol Živanice (4)
19 August 2014
Viktoria Žižkov (2)	2–1	Vysočina Jihlava (1)
20 August 2014
Jiskra Domažlice (3)	3–1	Dukla Prague (1)
Tachov (4)	1–3	MAS Táborsko (2)
2 September 2014
Velké Meziříčí (4)	0–3	Sigma Olomouc (2)

== Third round ==
The third round ties are scheduled for 3, 5, 6, 7, 9, 10, 24 September and 8 October 2014.

Team 1	Score	Team 2
3 September 2014
TJ Štěchovice (3)	0–1	Mladá Boleslav (1)
Viktoria Žižkov (2)	2–1	Slavia Prague (1)
5 September 2014
Ústí nad Labem (2)	0–3	Slovan Liberec (1)
Vlašim (2)	0–1	Příbram (1)
Opava (2)	1–0	Karviná (2)
6 September 2014
Bohemians Prague (Střížkov) (3)	0–3	Teplice (1)
Dobrovice (4)	1–2	Baumit Jablonec (1)
Bohemians 1905 (1)	2–0	České Budějovice (1)
Fastav Zlín (2)	0–4	FC Slovácko (1)
Sigma Olomouc (2)	0–1	Fotbal Třinec (2)
7 September 2014
Sokol Živanice (4)	1–3	Sparta Prague (1)
Frýdek-Místek (2)	1–2	Baník Ostrava (1)
9 September 2014
Admira Prague (3)	1–1 (3–4 p)	Hradec Králové (1)
10 September 2014
Jiskra Domažlice (3)	1–0	Pardubice (2)
24 September 2014
MAS Táborsko (2)	0–3	Viktoria Plzeň (1)
8 October 2014
SC Znojmo (2)	1–0	Zbrojovka Brno (1)

== Fourth round ==
The fourth round ties were played on 23, 24 and 30 September, 8, 9, 14 and 29 October, 4, 5, 18 and 19 November and 4 December 2014.

Team 1	Agg.	Team 2	1st leg	2nd leg
Viktoria Žižkov (2)	1–6	Mladá Boleslav (1)	1–1	0–5
Baumit Jablonec (1)	4–0	Bohemians 1905 (1)	2–0	2–0
Fotbal Třinec (2)	2–0	Opava (2)	2–0	0–0
Jiskra Domažlice (3)	2–5	Teplice (1)	0–4	2–1
Baník Ostrava (1)	2–2 (3–4 p)	Slovácko (1)	1–1	1–1
Slovan Liberec (1)	8–1	Znojmo (2)	6–0	2–1
Hradec Králové (1)	1–2	Viktoria Plzeň (1)	1–2	0–0
Příbram (1)	2–4	Sparta Prague (1)	1–1	1–3

== Quarter-finals ==
Quarter-final matches were played on 31 March and 14 April 2015.

Team 1	Agg.	Team 2	1st leg	2nd leg
Fotbal Třinec (2)	3–3 (a)	Slovan Liberec (1)	3–1	0–2
Teplice (1)	3–3 (4–3 p)	Viktoria Plzeň (1)	2–1	1–2
Slovácko (1)	5–7	Mladá Boleslav (1)	2–2	3–5
Sparta Prague (1)	2–3	Baumit Jablonec (1)	2–1	0–2

=== First legs ===
17 March 2015	Sparta Prague	2–1	Baumit Jablonec	Prague
18:00	Řezníček 10'; Kadlec 39'	Report	Doležal 57'	Stadium: Generali Arena; Attendance: 2,557; Referee: Pavel Královec

1 April 2015	Fotbal Třinec	3–1	Slovan Liberec	Třinec
15:30	Smetana 4'; Dedič 81'; Motyčka 87'	Report	Delarge 56'	Stadium: Stadion Rudolfa Labaje; Attendance: 514; Referee: Jiří Jech

1 April 2015	Slovácko	2–2	Mladá Boleslav	Uherské Hradiště
16:00	Diviš 7'; Košút 85'	Report	Wágner 34'; Skalák 56'	Stadium: Městský fotbalový stadion Miroslava Valenty; Attendance: 1,022; Referee: Emanuel Marek

8 April 2015	Teplice	2–1	Viktoria Plzeň	Teplice
18:00	Potočný 80'; Balázs 89'	Report	Rajtoral 77'	Stadium: Na Stínadlech; Attendance: 2,381; Referee: Jiří Jech

=== Second legs ===
14 April 2015	Mladá Boleslav	5–3 (7–5 agg.)	Slovácko	Mladá Boleslav
17:00	Wágner 21', 65' (pen.); Skalák 54'; Ďuriš 75', 89'	Report	Trávník 41'; Košút 77'; Diviš 90+3'	Stadium: Městský stadion Attendance: 477; Referee: Jiří Houdek

14 April 2015	Baumit Jablonec	2–0 (3–2 agg.)	Sparta Prague	Jablonec nad Nisou
17:30	Novák 22' (pen.); Kopic 37'	Report		Stadium: Chance Arena; Attendance: 2,911; Referee: Petr Ardeleánu

14 April 2015	Slovan Liberec	2–0 (3(a)–3 agg.)	Fotbal Třinec	Liberec
17:30	Breznaník 67'; Pavelka 88'	Report		Stadium: Stadion u Nisy; Attendance: 2,224; Referee: Ondřej Pechanec

15 April 2015	Viktoria Plzeň	2–1 (3–3 agg.) (3–4 p)	Teplice	Plzeň
18:00	Holenda 62'; Baránek 77'	Report	Litsingi 69'	Stadium: Doosan Arena; Attendance: 8,357; Referee: Pavel Orel
	Penalties
	Kovařík (penalty scored); Rajtoral (penalty missed); Mahmutović (penalty missed); Hořava (penalty scored); Limberský (penalty scored)		(penalty missed) Hora; (penalty scored) Jablonský; (penalty scored) Potočný; (penalty scored) Krob; (penalty scored) Ljevaković

== Semi-finals ==
Semifinal matches were played on 28/29 April and 12 May 2015.

Team 1	Agg.	Team 2	1st leg	2nd leg
Slovan Liberec (1)	4–3	Teplice (1)	3–0	1–3
Mladá Boleslav (1)	1–3	Baumit Jablonec (1)	1–2	0–1

=== First legs ===
28 April 2015	Slovan Liberec	3–0	Teplice	Liberec
19:10	Djika 11'; Brabec 16'; Luckassen 47'	Report		Stadium: Stadion u Nisy; Attendance: 2,605; Referee: Jan Machálek

29 April 2015	Mladá Boleslav	1–2	Baumit Jablonec	Mladá Boleslav
19:10	Zahustel 35'	Report	Mingazow 6'; Kopic 18'	Stadium: Městský stadion Attendance: 810; Referee: Pavel Julínek

=== Second legs ===
12 May 2015	Baumit Jablonec	1–0 (3–1 agg.)	Mladá Boleslav	Jablonec nad Nisou
17:30	Greguš 90'	Report		Stadium: Chance Arena; Attendance: 2,182; Referee: Pavel Orel

12 May 2015	Teplice	3–1 (3–4 agg.)	Slovan Liberec	Teplice
18:15	Hošek 31'; Krob 43'; Balázs 72'	Report	Frýdek 60'	Stadium: Na Stínadlech; Attendance: 1,083; Referee: Ondřej Berka

== Final ==
The final was played at Mladá Boleslav City Stadium on 27 May 2015.

27 May 2015	Baumit Jablonec	1–1 (1–3 p)	Slovan Liberec	Mladá Boleslav
18:00	Doležal 38'		Bakoš 86'	Stadium: Městský stadion Attendance: 4,382; Referee: Zbyněk Proske
	Penalties
	Novák (penalty missed); Greguš (penalty scored); Doležal (penalty missed); Rossi (penalty missed)		(penalty scored) Pavelka; (penalty missed) Frýdek; (penalty scored) Breznaník; (penalty scored) Šural

== See also ==
- 2014–15 Czech First League
- 2014–15 Czech National Football League
