= Football in the Czech Republic =

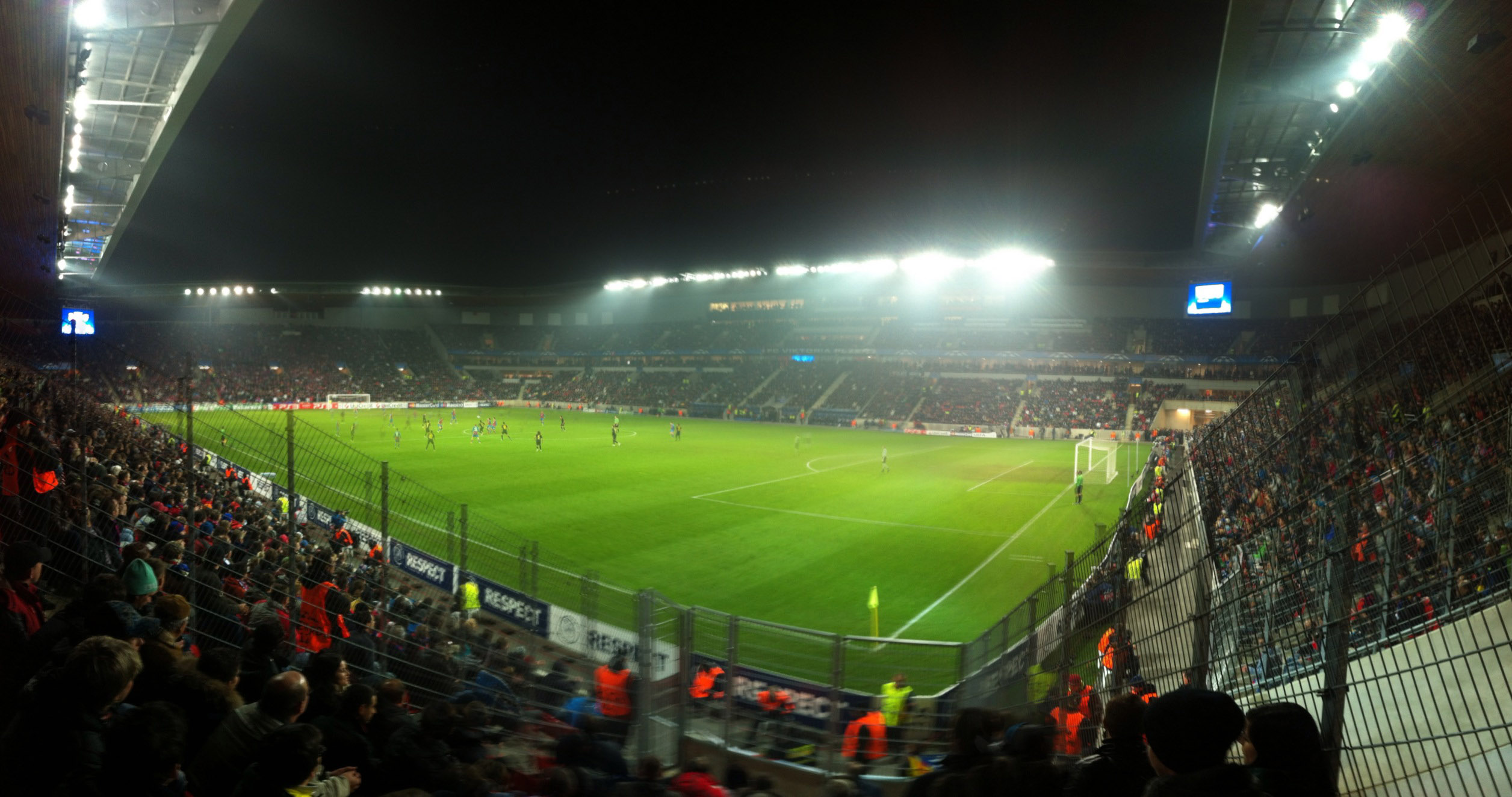
- Eden Aréna, SK Slavia's Stadium
- Country: Czech Republic
- Governing body: FAČR
- National team: Czech Republic national football team
- First played: 1892; 134 years ago
- Registered players: 280,000
- Clubs: 15,378

National competitions
- FIFA World Cup; UEFA European Championship; UEFA Nations League

Club competitions
- List: League: Czech First League; Czech Women's First League; Czech National Football League; Cups Czech Cup Czech Women's Cup

International competitions
- FIFA Club World Cup; FIFA Intercontinental Cup; UEFA Champions League; UEFA Women's Champions League; UEFA Europa League; UEFA Conference League; UEFA Super Cup

This article discusses the structure of football leagues in the Czech Republic. These leagues are organised by The Football Association of the Czech Republic (FAČR) (Czech: Fotbalová asociace České republiky). Football is the most popular sport in the Czech Republic. Approximately half of the Czech people are interested in football.

== History ==
Bohemia was an early adopter of football. In the Czech Republic, football originated in Bohemia between 1890 and 1900, mainly played by Germans (the country was part of the Austro-Hungarian empire). The best German club was called Regatta Prag. The first known football match in the Czech Republic occurred on the islet located in the Labe River in Roudnice nad Labem in 1887. In 1896 the first derby between SK Slavia Prague and AC Sparta Prague was disputed with the result of 0–1. In 1896, the first Czech championship, won by CFK Kickers Prague (spring) and Deutscher FC Prag (autumn) was disputed. In 1897 the Czech Crown championship was won, won by Slavia and in 1902 the Czech Football Association championship won by the Cesky AFC Vinohrady. Czechoslovak First League was the premier football league in the Czechoslovakia from 1925 to 1993.

In 1901 the Czech Football Federation was created. Between 1903 and 1908, the selection of soccer of Bohemia disputed seven international parties. Subsequently, between 1922 and 1993, the selection and federation of the Czech Republic became the respective ones of Czechoslovakia. As of this last year, the organizations of the Czech Republic revived, again as an independent state.

== League system ==
The highest level is also known as 1st league (Czech: První liga) – officially Fortuna: liga. The winner and team finishing second are promoted from the 2nd Division.

The 2. liga (Second Division) is at the second tier of the football pyramid. The winners of the ČFL and MSFL are promoted to this division, making two clubs in total. Sometimes when two clubs are relegated to the same 3rd division (for example to MSFL), the MSFL relegates three clubs instead of the usual two (example: we have got two downward clubs from 2nd league – from Moravia – to MSFL. From MSFL one club will be promoted and three clubs will be relegated to Moravia-Silesia Divisions (D and E) for the next season. Normally two teams are relegated from the MSFL and three from the ČFL).

Winners of the Czech Fourth Division Bohemian groups (A, B, C) are promoted to the ČFL, whilst in Moravia-Silesia groups (D, E) the teams are promoted to the MSFL.

Winners of Regional Championships are promoted to the Fourth Division (example: winner of the Prague Championship is promoted to Division A).

Level	League(s)/Division(s)
1	Czech First League; 16 clubs
2	Czech Second Division; 16 clubs
3	ČFL (Bohemian Football League); 18 clubs									MSFL (Moravian–Silesian Football League); 16 clubs
4	Czech Division A 16 clubs			Czech Division B 16 clubs			Czech Division C 16 clubs			Moravia-Silesia Division D 16 clubs			Moravia-Silesia Division E 16 clubs
5	Prague Championship; 16 clubs	Přebor Středočeského kraje 16 clubs	Přebor Jihočeského kraje 16 clubs	Přebor Plzeňského kraje 16 clubs	Přebor Karlovarského kraje 18 clubs	Přebor Ústeckého kraje 16 clubs	Přebor Libereckého kraje 14 clubs	Přebor Královéhradeckého kraje 16 clubs	Přebor Pardubického kraje 16 clubs	Přebor kraje Vysočina; 14 clubs	Přebor Jihomoravského kraje 16 clubs	Přebor Zlínského kraje 16 clubs	Přebor Olomouckého kraje 16 clubs	Přebor Moravskoslezského kraje 16 clubs
6	Level A2 - I.A třída
7	Level A3 - I.B třída
8	Level A4 - II. třída
9	Level A5 - III. třída

== National team ==
Before the break-up of the country, Czech players represented Czechoslovakia, whose national team was for many years one of the leading teams in the world. Since the break-up of Czechoslovakia the Czech national team has had success in Euro 96 and Euro 2004. The selection of the Czech Republic national teams is controlled by the Football Association of the Czech Republic.

The Czech team played their first official game on 23 February 1994 in Istanbul against Turkey, winning 4–1. The Czech Republic has managed to qualify for one FIFA World Cup and five European Championships. The greatest achievement of the Czech team was reaching the final of Euro 96 in England, eliminating Portugal and France to reach the final against Germany. On 30 June 1996 at Wembley Stadium, the Czech team lost the final 2–1 to Germany after taking the lead with a goal from Patrik Berger, before losing to an extra-time golden goal scored by Oliver Bierhoff. The following year they participated in the FIFA Confederations Cup held in Saudi Arabia, being eliminated in the semifinals after a 2–0 defeat to Brazil.

At the time when the country was part of Czechoslovakia, the national team achieved victory in the 1976 European Championship against Germany in a penalty shoot-out, thanks to the famous penalty of Antonin Panenka. The Czechoslovak team qualified for the World Cup on eight occasions, finishing runners-up in both 1934 and 1962, as well as appearing in three other European Championships.

== Women's football ==
Women's football is well organised in the Czech Republic. The women's team debuted on 21 July 1993, against Slovakia, in a match won by the Czechs 6–0. The women's team of the Czech Republic has not yet participated in a final phase of the World Cup or European Championship.

== Prague ==
Prague has six professional football teams and a total of 14 in the top four divisions of national competition.

Below the fourth tier, the Prague Football Association organises the fifth-tier Prague Championship, which is contested by 16 teams, all of which are based in Prague.

=== Stadia and locations ===
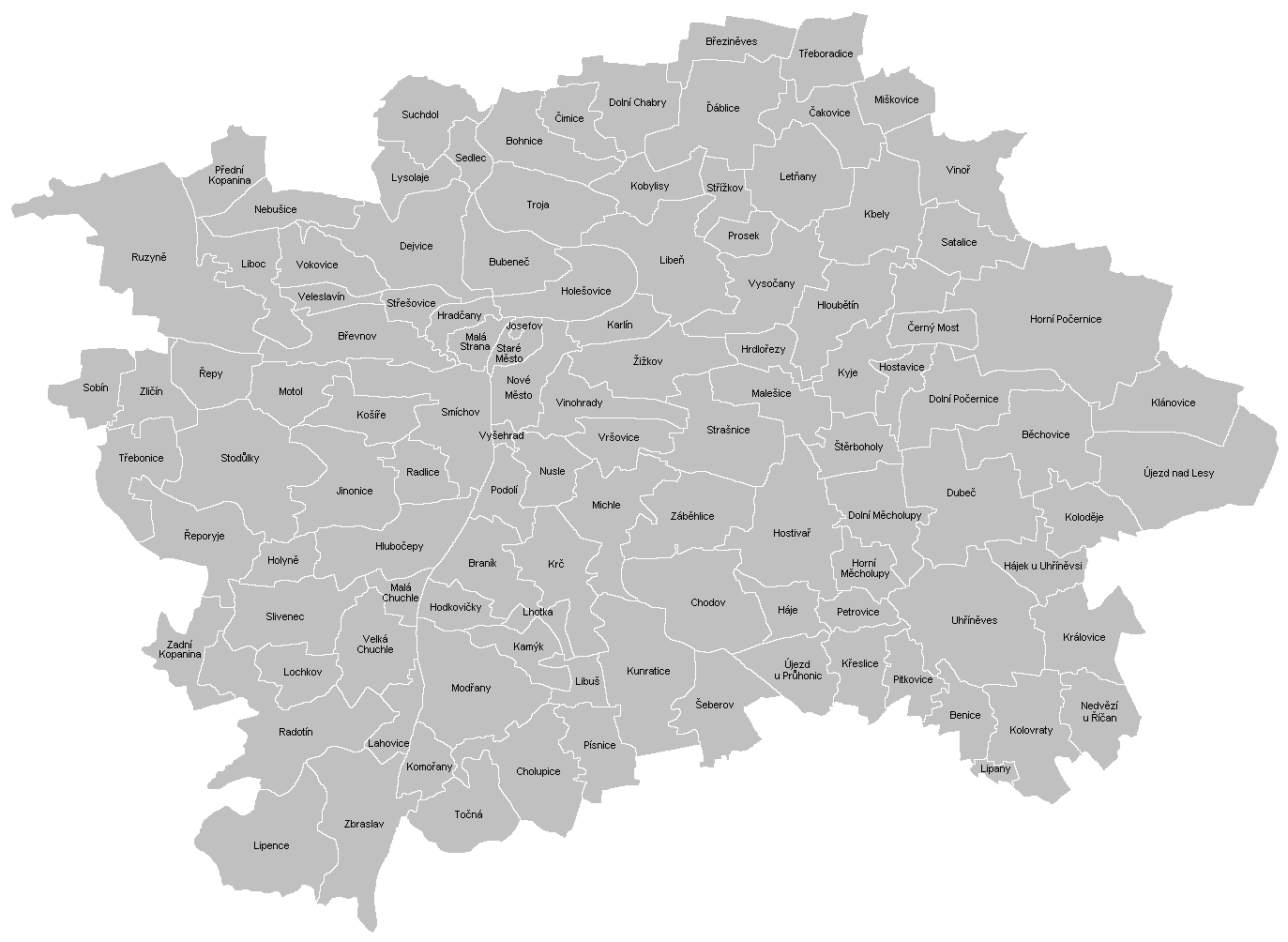
Locations of Prague clubs in 2022–23 football competitions (top four tiers only, excludes "B" teams)

=== Clubs ===
The table below lists all Prague clubs excluding "B" teams in the top four tiers of the Czech football league system: from the top division (the Czech First League), down to the Czech Fourth Division. League status is correct for the 2022–23 season.

Club	Stadium	Capacity	Founded	Notes
Czech First League (1)
Bohemians 1905	Ďolíček	7,500	1905	
Slavia Prague	Eden Arena	20,800	1892	
Sparta Prague	Generali Arena	19,416	1893	
Czech 2. Liga (2)
Dukla Prague	Stadion Juliska	8,150	1959	
Bohemian Football League (3)
Viktoria Žižkov	FK Viktoria Stadion	5,037	1903	
Admira Prague	Stadion v Kobylisích	4,000	1907	
Loko Vltavín	Stadion na Plynárně	1,500	1898	
Motorlet Prague	Stadion Motorlet	5,000	1912	
Divize A (4)
Aritma Prague	Areál SK Aritma	2,000	1908	
Meteor Prague	Areál Libeň	3,500	1896	
Újezd Prague 4	Hřiště SK Újezd	0	1937	

=== Administration ===
Prague is the location of the headquarters of the Football Association of the Czech Republic, in Diskařská street.

== Attendances ==
The average attendance per top-flight football league season and the club with the highest average attendance:

Season	League average	Best club	Best club average
2024–25	6,177	Slavia Praha	18,306
2023–24	6,456	Slavia Praha	17,688
2022–23	5,528	Slavia Praha	14,729
2019–20	5,669	Slavia Praha	14,715
2018–19	5,539	Slavia Praha	13,511
2017–18	5,546	Slavia Praha	12,431
2016–17	4,887	Slavia Praha	11,625
2015–16	5,080	Viktoria Plzeň	10,620
2014–15	4,739	Viktoria Plzeň	10,867
2013–14	5,064	Sparta Praha	11,340
2012–13	4,798	Viktoria Plzeň	10,047
2011–12	4,715	Sparta Praha	10,322
2010–11	4,492	Sparta Praha	8,665
2009–10	4,895	Sparta Praha	10,766
2008–09	4,668	Slavia Praha	11,971
2007–08	5,147	Baník Ostrava	11,022
2006–07	4,874	Sparta Praha	11,848
2005–06	4,091	Sparta Praha	7,211
2004–05	3,860	Baník Ostrava	8,028
2003–04	4,830	Baník Ostrava	15,376
2002–03	3,892	Sparta Praha	6,214
2001–02	4,740	Baník Ostrava	8,007
2000–01	4,550	Sigma Olomouc	7,718
1999–2000	5,953	Opava	11,234
1998–99	6,042	Zbrojovka Brno	13,207
1997–98	6,156	Zbrojovka Brno	15,365
1996–97	7,145	Zbrojovka Brno	21,659
1995–96	5,130	Zbrojovka Brno	12,283
1994–95	5,750	Zbrojovka Brno	20,523
1993–94	4,654	Zbrojovka Brno	9,501

== See also ==
- Czech Republic football league system
- List of football stadiums in the Czech Republic
