= TJ Slavia Louňovice =

Slavia Louňovice
- Full name: Tělovýchovná jednota Slavia Louňovice, z. s.
- Founded: 1927
- League: 3.B 3. třída Praha-východ
- 2022–23: 11th
Home colours	Away colours

TJ Slavia Louňovice is a football club located in the village of Louňovice near Prague, Czech Republic. The club was founded in 1927. It currently plays in the lower leagues of competition. It played the 2014–15 season in the Bohemian Football League, which is in the third tier of the Czech football system.

Louňovice reached the third-tier Bohemian Football League for the first time in their history in 2014, after beating FK Slavoj Vyšehrad to the Divize B title in the 2013–14 Czech Fourth Division.
