= TJ Sokol Cholupice =

Czech football club

Sokol Cholupice
- Full name: TJ Sokol Cholupice, z.s.
- Founded: 1924
- Ground: Hrazanská ul. Prague 4 – Cholupice
- Manager: Rudolf Kahle
- League: 1.A třída, skupina B
- 2022–23: 12th
Home colours

Former club logo

TJ Sokol Cholupice is a Czech football club located in Prague-Cholupice, Czech Republic. It played in the Prague Championship, the fifth tier of the Czech football system, until being relegated at the end of the 2010–11 season.
