= Stadion Evžena Rošického =

Sports stadium in Prague, Czech Republic

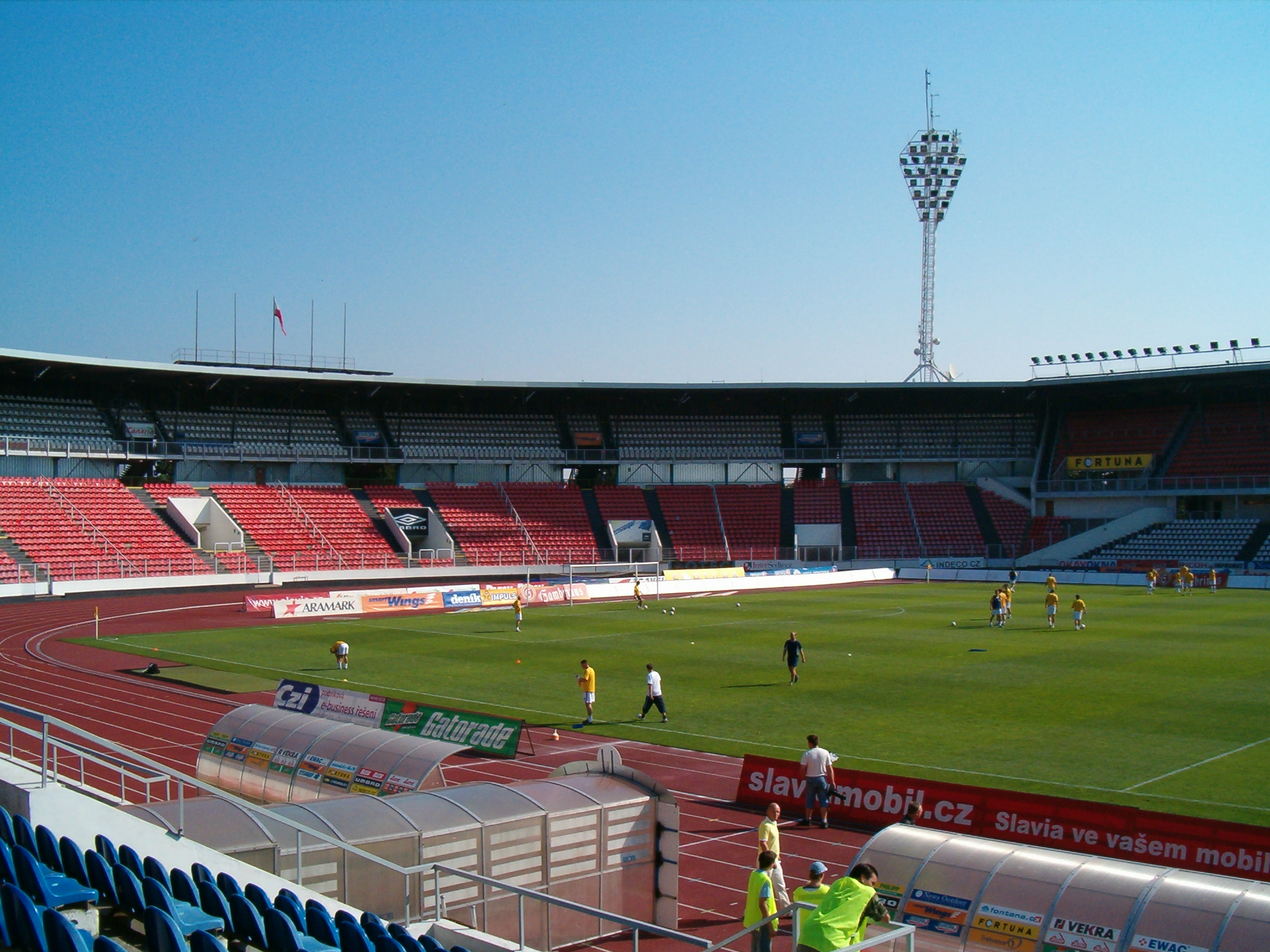
- Stadion Evžena Rošického, north stand
- Interactive map of Stadion Evžena Rošického
- Location: Prague, Czech Republic
- Coordinates: 50°4′50″N 14°23′1″E
- Capacity: 19,032

Construction
- Opened: 1935
- Closed: 2022

Tenants
- AC Sparta Prague (2000); SK Slavia Prague (2000–2008); SK Sparta Krč (2007–2008); AC Sparta Prague B (2008–2010); Bohemians Prague (2009–2010); Bohemians 1905 (2010); SK Kladno (2010); FK Dukla Prague (2011); FK Olympia Prague (2017–2018); FK Slavoj Vyšehrad (2018–2021); AC Sparta Prague B (2021–2022)

Stadion Evžena Rošického, also known simply as Strahov, is a multi-purpose stadium in Strahov, Prague in the Czech Republic. It hosted the 1978 European Athletics Championships and for many years this was the venue for main annual international track and field meet of Prague (Evžen Rošický Memorial and later Josef Odložil Memorial) until Stadion Juliska took the role in 2002. Since then the stadium has been used only for minor domestic athletic competitions and mostly for football matches. It served as the home ground for SK Slavia Prague from August 2000 until May 2008 when their new stadium, the Synot Tip Arena, was opened. It is also occasionally used by other Czech teams, and is the usual venue for the Czech Cup final.

The stadium holds 19,032 spectators. Stadion Evžena Rošického is adjacent to the considerably larger Great Strahov Stadium, the second biggest in the world.

It is named after Czech athlete and anti-Nazi resistant Evžen Rošický, executed by the Nazis in 1942.

Since 2022, Stadion Evžena Rošického has been closed due to its inadequate technical state.

== Club football ==
Sparta Prague played here at the end of the 2000–01 season due to the installation of under-soil heating at their stadium. Viktoria Žižkov played European matches here in the 2001–02 UEFA Cup and 2002–03 UEFA Cup. Sparta Krč played its home matches here in the 2007–08 Czech 2. Liga. Sparta's reserves played here for two seasons, in the 2008–09 Czech 2. Liga and 2009–10 Czech 2. Liga.

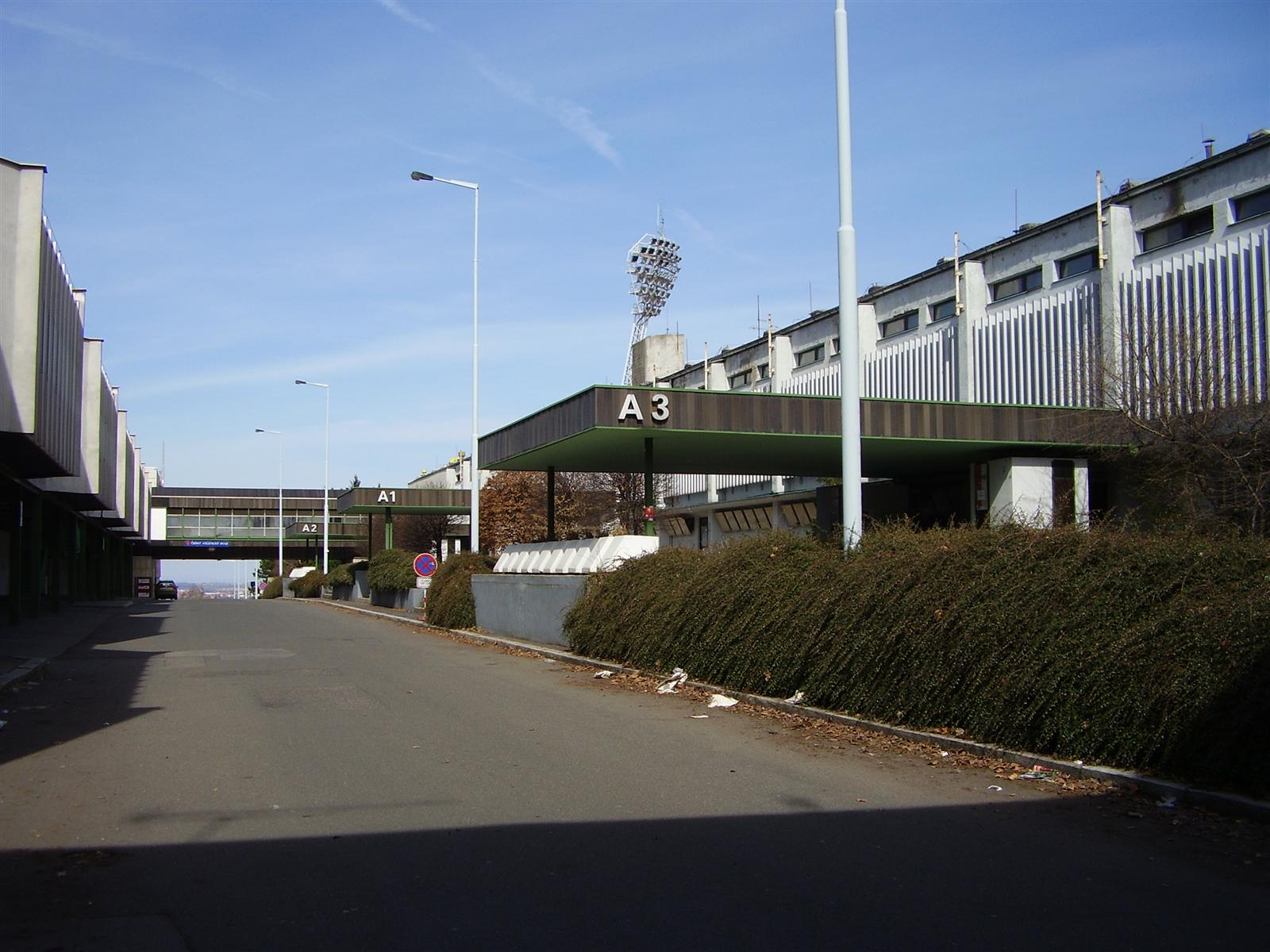
Outside of stadium from Diskařská street

In the 2009–10 season, Bohemians Prague used Stadion Evžena Rošického as its home stadium. Additionally, SK Kladno and Bohemians 1905 both played one home match here in March 2010 due to under-soil heating concerns at their own stadia, after the winter break.

In October 2011, Dukla Prague played a match here while work was done on their under-soil heating and seating installation in the 2011–12 Czech First League. By doing so, Dukla became the ninth team to play a home match at Strahov in ten years.

In December 2022, the stadium was closed due serious defects of its steel structure. According to Football Association of the Czech Republic (FAČR) spokesperson, the stadium was no longer safe to use and its repair would be a large-scale investment which the FAČR was unable to secure at the time.

== International matches ==
Stadion Evžena Rošického has hosted two friendly matches of the Czech Republic national football team

24 April 1996 International Friendly	Czech Republic	2–0	Republic of Ireland	Prague, Czech Republic
Match 528/20	Frýdek, Sr. 61'; Kuka 69'	Report		Stadium: Stadion Evžena Rošického; Attendance: 6,118; Referee: Strampe (Germany)

18 August 2004 International Friendly	Czech Republic	0–0	Greece	Prague, Czech Republic
Match 631/123		ČMFS Report		Stadium: Stadion Evžena Rošického; Attendance: 15,050; Referee: Dougal (Scotland)

== See also ==
- List of football stadiums in the Czech Republic
- Lists of stadiums
