= Tomáš Košút =

Slovak footballer

Personal information
- Full name: Tomáš Košút
- Date of birth: 13 January 1990 (age 36)
- Place of birth: Piešťany, Czechoslovakia
- Height: 1.89 m (6 ft 2 in)
- Position: Centre back

Team information
- Current team: Zličín

Youth career
- 1996–2004: Piešťany
- 2004–2008: Nitra

Senior career*
Years	Team	Apps	(Gls)
2008–2009	Nitra	2	(0)
2009–2010	Sparta Prague B	8	(0)
2010–2017	Slovácko	158	(10)
2017	Arka Gdynia	0	(0)
2018	Honvéd Budapest	7	(0)
2018	Vereya	8	(0)
2019	Spartak Trnava	8	(0)
2019	Senica	4	(0)
2020	Sanse	3	(0)
2020–2021	Slavoj Vyšehrad	11	(1)
2021–2024	Spoje Prague		
2024–	Zličín	12	(0)

International career
2008–2009	Slovakia U19	14	(1)
2010–2012	Slovakia U21	11	(0)
- * Club domestic league appearances and goals as of 10:25, 6 January 2025 (UTC)

Tomáš Košút (born 13 January 1990) is a Slovak professional footballer who plays as a defender for Czech club Zličín as a centre-back.

== Club career ==
=== Early career ===
Košút was involved with Slovak side Nitra for three years before moving to the Czech Republic, where he played in the second tier for Sparta Prague B, also spending three years with the club.

=== Slovácko ===
Košút joined Slovácko of the Czech First League in January 2010, initially on a loan with an option for a permanent transfer from Sparta Prague. After scoring 8 goals in his first three years at the club, it was almost three years until he scored in the league again, heading the winning goal in a 2–1 victory against Brno in March 2016. Having made 158 appearances in the Czech First League, scoring 10 goals, he was linked with a move to Kazakhstan to play for FC Ordabasy in February 2017.

=== Mid-career ===
Between 2017 and 2020, Košút played for six clubs. In June 2017, Košút signed for Polish side Arka Gdynia. He didn't play for the first team of Gdynia, only playing in the Polish fourth tier for the B-team, for whom he scored once in nine matches. He agreed to terminate his contract in December of the same year. He went on to play for Honvéd Budapest in Hungary and Vereya in Bulgaria. In January 2019 he returned to his native Slovakia to sign for Spartak Trnava. He received a red card in a league match against Zlaté Moravce for handball on the goal line, although the punishment was later rescinded by the disciplinary commission of the Slovak Football Association. During the season he won the 2018–19 Slovak Cup with Trnava. He moved to Senica in July 2019, signing a one-year contract. In January 2020, he joined San Sebastián de los Reyes of the Spanish third tier.

== National team ==
Košút captained the Slovakia U19 team early in his career. Involved in the Slovakia U21 team, Košút's form dipped in the spring of 2011, leading to his omission from several national squads.

== Honours ==
Spartak Trnava

- Slovak Cup: 2018–19
