= Jindřich Trpišovský =

Czech football manager

- Trpišovský in 2026

Personal information
- Date of birth: 27 February 1976 (age 50)
- Place of birth: Prague, Czechoslovakia
- Position: Goalkeeper

Team information
- Current team: Slavia Prague (manager)

Senior career*
Years	Team	Apps	(Gls)
- Čechie Karlín

Managerial career
- 2011–2013: Horní Měcholupy
- 2013–2015: Viktoria Žižkov
- 2015–2017: Slovan Liberec
- 2017–: Slavia Prague
- * Club domestic league appearances and goals

Jindřich Trpišovský (born 27 February 1976) is a Czech professional football manager who is currently the manager of Slavia Prague. He has won five Czech First League and four Czech Cup titles with them.

== Playing career ==
During his playing career, Trpišovský played for Čechie Karlín as a goalkeeper. At the age of 12, Trpišovský was discouraged from playing football due to knee problems, before returning to the sport at the age of 17.

== Managerial career ==
At the age of 20, Trpišovský began coaching at Čechie Karlín's youth teams, combining coaching with working at the Esplanade Hotel in Prague. Trpišovský later joined Bohemians 1905 and Sparta Prague as a youth coach, before joining Xaverov as an assistant.

In 2011, Trpišovský was named as manager of SK Horní Měcholupy. At the same time, Trpišovský was working at Czech Second League side Viktoria Žižkov as assistant, due to Žižkov being Horní Měcholupy's parent club. In 2013, Trpišovský became manager of Žižkov.

In July 2015, Trpišovský was named as the new manager of Slovan Liberec after David Vavruška's departure to Teplice. During his time at Liberec, Trpišovský guided the club to the UEFA Europa League group stages twice, finishing third in 2015–16 in a group containing Braga, Groningen and Marseille.

On 22 December 2017, Trpišovský signed a contract with Slavia Prague. At the end of Trpišovský's first season at Slavia, the club won the Czech Cup. The following season, Slavia won the league and cup double, as well as reaching the quarter-finals of the Europa League. Slavia reached the group stages of the UEFA Champions League in the 2019–20 season, as well as winning the Czech First League for the second time under Trpišovský's tenure. In 2021, Slavia once again won the league and cup double, their third consecutive league title under Trpišovský's management, as well as reaching the quarter-finals of the Europa League, knocking out Leicester City and Rangers along the way.

== Managerial statistics ==
As of match played 21 November 2026

Managerial record by team and tenure
Team	From	To	Record								Ref
Team	From	To	G	W	D	L	GF	GA	GD	Win %	Ref
Horní Měcholupy	1 July 2011	24 June 2013	66	31	14	21	119	92	+27	46.97	
Viktoria Žižkov	24 June 2013	1 July 2015	68	34	14	20	101	69	+32	50.00	
Slovan Liberec	1 July 2015	22 December 2017	108	54	22	32	162	118	+44	50.00	
Slavia Prague	22 December 2017	Present	444	290	82	72	947	376	+571	65.32	
Total			686	409	132	145	1,329	655	+674	59.62	—

== Honours ==
=== Managerial ===
Slavia Prague

- Czech First League: 2018–19, 2019–20, 2020–21, 2024–25, 2025–26
- Czech Cup: 2017–18, 2018–19, 2020–21, 2022–23
- Czechoslovak Supercup: 2019

Individual

- Czech First League Manager of the Season: 2019–20, 2020–21
