= SC Olympia Radotín =

Football club in Prague, Czechia

- Full name: Sportovní centrum Olympia Radotín z.s.
- Founded: 1922
- Ground: Areál SC Radotín; Prague 5 – Radotín
- Chairman: Karel Klíma
- Manager: Petr Procházka
- League: Prague Championship
- 2025–26: 7th
Home colours

SC Olympia Radotín is a football club located in the Radotín district of Prague, Czech Republic. They played in the fifth tier of the Czech football system. The club won the Prague Championship in 2011, but refused promotion, so the B team of FK Dukla Prague went up to the Czech Fourth Division in their place, as league runners-up for the season. In 2018, the club merged with FK Olympia Prague during that club's relocation to Radotín and rebranding to SC Olympia Radotín.

== Honours ==
Former club logo

- Prague Championship (fifth tier)
  - Champions 2010–11
- Class 1.A (group B) (sixth tier)
  - Champions 2024–25
