= List of football stadiums in the Czech Republic =

The following is a list of football stadiums in the Czech Republic, ranked in order of capacity, with the minimum capacity being 1,000.

== Current stadiums ==
#	Image	Stadium	Capacity	City	Home team	UEFA rank
1		Fortuna Arena	19,370	Prague	SK Slavia Prague	4/4 stars
2		Stadion Evžena Rošického	19,032	Prague	none	
3		epet ARENA	18,944	Prague	AC Sparta Prague	4/4 stars
4		Na Stínadlech	18,221	Teplice	FK Teplice	
5		Městský stadion	15,123	Ostrava	FC Baník Ostrava, FC Vítkovice	
6		Andrův stadion	12,474	Olomouc	SK Sigma Olomouc	
7		Doosan Arena	11,700	Plzeň	FC Viktoria Plzeň	3/4 stars
8		Městský fotbalový stadion Srbská	10,200	Brno	FC Zbrojovka Brno	
9		Stadion u Nisy	9,900	Liberec	FC Slovan Liberec	
10		Malšovická aréna	9,300	Hradec Králové	FC Hradec Králové	4/4 stars
11		Na Litavce	9,100	Příbram	FK Příbram	
12		Stadion Juliska	8,150	Prague	FK Dukla Prague	
13		Městský fotbalový stadion	8,000	Uherské Hradiště	1. FC Slovácko	
14		Stadion v Městských sadech	7,524	Opava	SFC Opava	
15		Fotbalový stadion Josefa Masopusta	7,500	Most	FK Baník Most-Souš	
16		Stadion Střelecký ostrov	6,681	České Budějovice	SK Dynamo České Budějovice	
17		Letná Stadion	6,375	Zlín	FC Zlín	
18		Ďolíček	6,300	Prague	Bohemians 1905	
19		Stadion Střelnice	6,108	Jablonec nad Nisou	FK Jablonec	
20		FK Viktoria Stadion	5,334	Prague	FK Viktoria Žižkov, AC Sparta Prague B	
21		Lokotrans Aréna	5,000	Mladá Boleslav	FK Mladá Boleslav	
22		Městský stadion	4,833	Karviná	MFK Karviná	
23		Letní stadion	4,800	Chomutov	FC Chomutov	
24		CFIG Arena	4,600	Pardubice	FK Pardubice	
25		Stadion v Jiráskově ulici	4,500	Jihlava	FC Vysočina Jihlava	
26		Stadion Františka Kloze	4,000	Kladno	SK Kladno	
27		Městský stadion	4,000	Ústí nad Labem	FK Viagem Ústí nad Labem	
28		Na Chvalech	3,400	Prague	SC Xaverov	
29		Stadion Kollárova ulice	3,000	Vlašim	FC Sellier & Bellot Vlašim	
30		Městský stadion	3,000	Benešov	SK Benešov	
31		Stadion FK Holice	2,600	Olomouc	1. HFK Olomouc	
32		Městský stadion	2,599	Znojmo	1. SC Znojmo FK	
33		Stovky	2,400	Frýdek-Místek	FK Frýdek-Místek	
34		Stadion FK Chmel Blšany	2,300	Blšany	none	
35		Stadion Rudolfa Labaje	2,200	Třinec	FK Třinec	
36		Stadion v Kvapilově ulici	2,000	Tábor	FC Silon Táborsko	
37		Stadion Lokomotiva	1,600	Cheb	FK Hvězda Cheb	
38		Stadion Lokomotiva Praha	1,500	Prague	Loko Vltavín	
39		Stadion SK Prosek	1,000	Prague	FK Bohemians Prague	

== See also ==
- List of European stadiums by capacity
- List of association football stadiums by capacity
- List of association football stadiums by country
- List of sports venues by capacity
- List of stadiums by capacity
- Lists of stadiums
- Football in the Czech Republic
