= Prague 16 =

Municipal district in the Czech Republic

Prague 16 Praha 16
- Municipal District of Prague; Administrative District of Prague
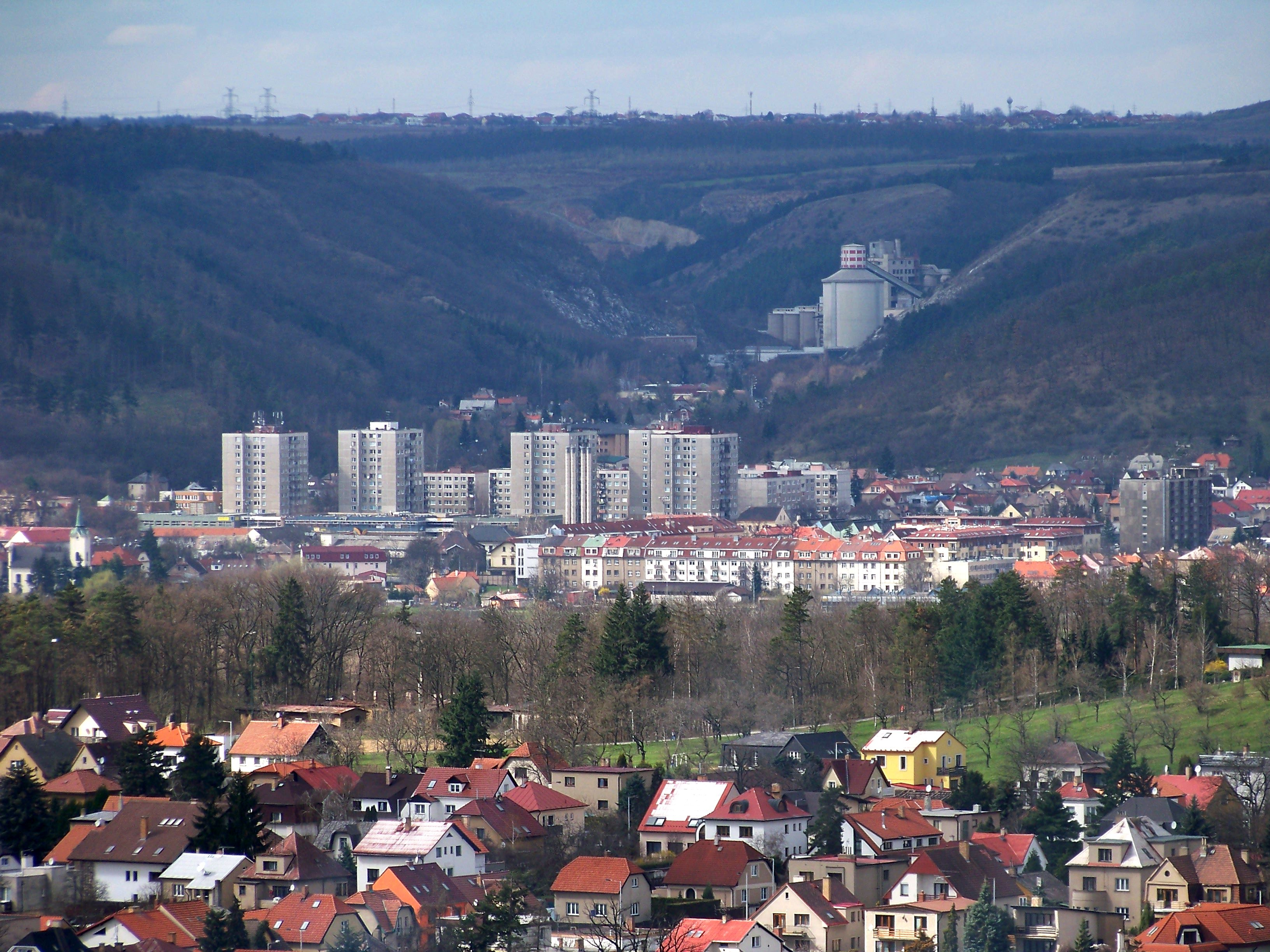
- Radotín

- Flag Coat of arms

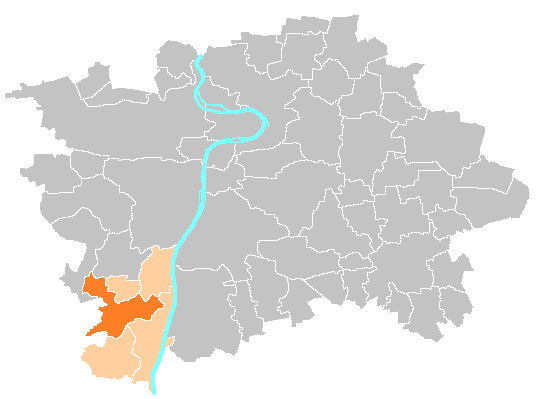
- Location of Prague 16 in Prague
- Coordinates: 49°59′3″N 14°21′28″E
- Country: Czech Republic
- Region: Prague

Government
  - Mayor: Karel Hanzlík

Area
  - Total: 9.31 km^{2} (3.59 sq mi)

Population (2021)
  - Total: 8,462
  - Density: 909/km^{2} (2,350/sq mi)
- Time zone: UTC+1 (CET)
  - Summer (DST): UTC+2 (CEST)
- Postal code: 153 00
- Website: praha16.eu

Prague 16 is a municipal district (městská část) of Prague. It has about 8,500 inhabitants. It is located in the south-western part of the city. It is formed by one cadastre, Radotín.

The administrative district (správní obvod) of the same name consists of municipal districts Prague 16, Lipence, Lochkov, Velká Chuchle and Zbraslav.

Historical population
Year	Pop.	±%
1869	494	—
1880	628	+27.1%
1890	944	+50.3%
1900	1,273	+34.9%
1910	1,800	+41.4%
1921	2,276	+26.4%
1930	4,704	+106.7%
1950	5,349	+13.7%
1961	6,152	+15.0%
1970	6,813	+10.7%
1980	6,399	−6.1%
1991	7,053	+10.2%
2001	7,089	+0.5%
2011	8,486	+19.7%
2021	8,462	−0.3%
Source: Censuses

== See also ==
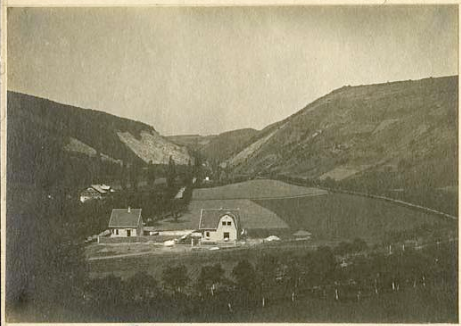
Radotín valley in 1914

- SC Radotín
- Olympia Radotín
