= SK Union Vršovice =

Vršovice
- Full name: Sportovní klub Union Vršovice, z.s.
- Founded: 1913
- Ground: Stadion SK Union Vršovice; Na vrších 1503/1; Prague 10 – Vršovice
- Manager: Michal Bareš
- League: 6. league, Class 1.A (group A)
- 2025–26: 1st (promoted)
| Home colours | Away colours |

SK Union Vršovice is a football club located in Prague-Vršovice, Czech Republic. It currently plays in the Class 1.A (group A), which is in the sixth tier of the Czech football system.

== Historical names ==
Club logo until 2006

- 1913 — SK Union Vršovice
- 1950 — Spartak Vršovice ALBA
- 1953 — TJ Plynárna Michle
- ? — TJ Spartak Kohinoor
- 1969 — TJ Praha Vršovice 1870
- 1991 — TJ Sokol Vršovice
- 1992 — SK Union Vršovice
- 1995 — SK Actherm Vršovice
- 2006 — SK Union Vršovice

== Honours ==
- Prague Championship (fifth tier)
  - Champions 2012–13
