= FC Přední Kopanina =

Přední Kopanina
- Full name: FC Přední Kopanina
- Founded: 1934
- Ground: Areál FC Přední Kopanina
- Capacity: 1,000
- Chairman: Tomáš Cigánek
- Manager: Karel Koloušek
- League: Czech Fourth Division – Divize B
- 2025–26: 16th (relegated)
Home colours

FC Přední Kopanina is a football club located in Prague-Přední Kopanina, Czech Republic. It currently plays in the Division B, the fourth tier of the Czech football system. The club reached the second round of the 2010–11 Czech Cup.

== Honours ==
- Prague Championship (fifth tier)
  - Champions 2008–09, 2014–15, 2015–16, 2023–24
