= FC Tempo Prague =

- Full name: FC Tempo Praha, z.s.
- Founded: 1928; 98 years ago
- Ground: Ve Lhotce 1045/3; Prague 4 – Lhotka
- Chairman: Jiří Trunečka
- Manager: Petr Vanko
- League: Czech Fourth Division – Divize B
- 2025–26: 4th
Home colours

FC Tempo Prague is a football club located in Prague-Lhotka, Czech Republic. It currently plays in the Czech Fourth Division having been promoted from the Prague Championship in 2024. The club took part in the 2013–14 Czech Cup and won their game in the preliminary round to qualify for the first round proper of the competition.

== Historical names ==
- 1928–1930 S.K. Lhotka
- 1930–1932 Olympia Praha XV
- 1932–1934 S.K. Lhotka
- 1934–1948 A.F.K. Zátiší
- 1948–1978 Sokol Lhotka
- 1978–1990 TJ Tempo Praha
- 1990- FC Tempo Praha

Club logo until 2016
