= SK Horní Měcholupy =

Horní Měcholupy
- Full name: SK Horní Měcholupy
- Founded: 1932
- Ground: Stadion SK Horní Měcholupy; U Golfu 300; Prague 10
- Capacity: 1,000
- Chairman: Tomáš Novotný
- League: 9. league, 3. class, group B
- 2025–26: 1st (promoted)
- Website: https://skhm.cz/
Home colours

SK Horní Měcholupy is a Czech football club located in Prague-Horní Měcholupy.

In 2018, the men's team closed down due to financial problems and now the club plays only youth competitions.

== Honours ==
- Czech Fourth Division (fourth tier)
  - Champions Divize A 2011–12
- Prague Championship (fifth tier)
  - Champions 2004–05, 2006–07
