= Horní Ředice =

- Municipality
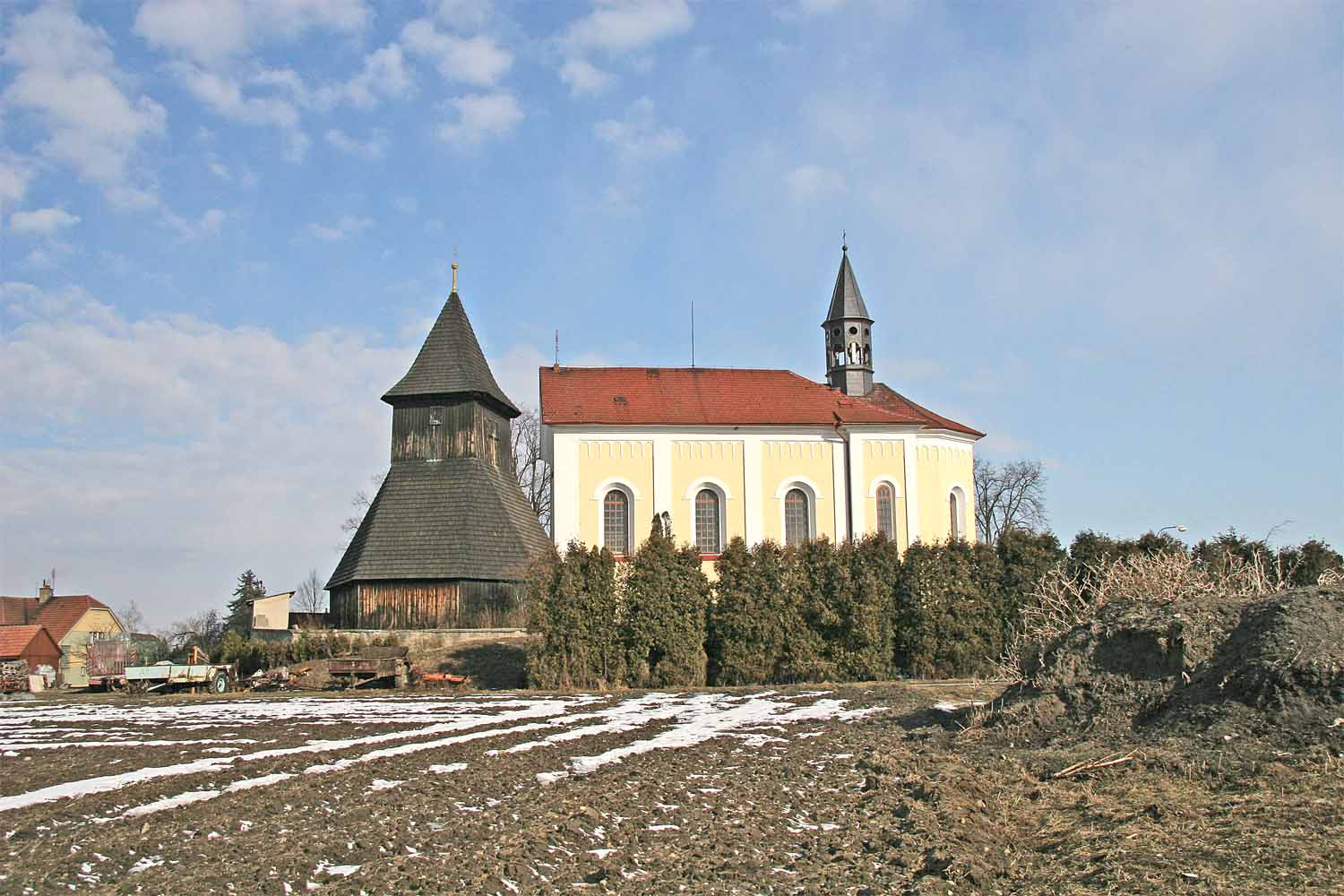
- Church of Saint Wenceslaus

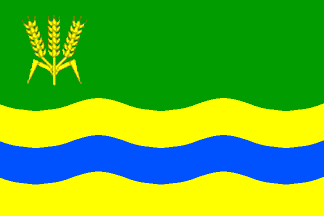
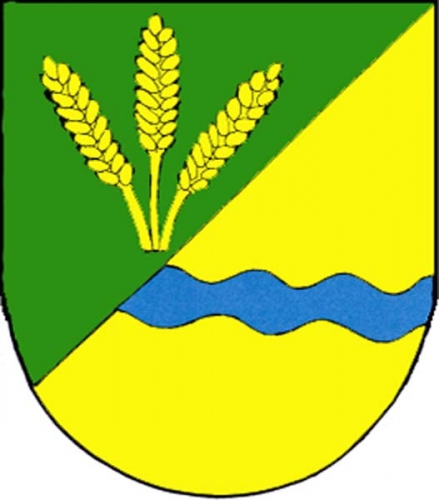
- Flag Coat of arms

- Location in the Czech Republic
- Coordinates: 50°4′36″N 15°57′32″E
- Country: Czech Republic
- Region: Pardubice
- District: Pardubice
- First mentioned: 1336

Area
  - Total: 11.11 km^{2} (4.29 sq mi)
- Elevation: 237 m (778 ft)

Population (2026-01-01)
  - Total: 1,063
  - Density: 95.68/km^{2} (247.8/sq mi)
- Time zone: UTC+1 (CET)
  - Summer (DST): UTC+2 (CEST)
- Postal code: 533 75
- Website: www.horniredice.cz

Horní Ředice is a municipality and village in Pardubice District in the Pardubice Region of the Czech Republic. It has about 1,100 inhabitants.

== Demographics ==
Historical population
Year	Pop.	±%
1869	803	—
1880	868	+8.1%
1890	897	+3.3%
1900	881	−1.8%
1910	954	+8.3%
1921	920	−3.6%
1930	910	−1.1%
1950	787	−13.5%
1961	832	+5.7%
1970	779	−6.4%
1980	789	+1.3%
1991	768	−2.7%
2001	778	+1.3%
2011	986	+26.7%
2021	1,023	+3.8%
Source: Censuses
