= FK Motorlet Prague =

- Full name: Fotbalový klub Motorlet Praha
- Founded: 1912; 114 years ago
- Ground: Stadion Motorlet
- Capacity: 5,000
- Chairman: Rudolf Blažek
- Manager: Radim Nečas
- League: Bohemian Football League A
- 2025–26: 14th
- Website: fotbalmotorlet.cz
Home colours	Away colours

FK Motorlet Prague is a football club located in Prague-Jinonice, Czech Republic. The club currently plays in the Bohemian Football League, which is the third tier of the Czech football system.

== History ==
The club took part in the 1963–64 Czechoslovak First League, finishing the season with only one win from 26 games. Outside of the top flight, the club played in the 1983–84 Česká národní liga, at the time the second highest level of football in Czechoslovakia.

== Historical names ==
- 1912 Sportovní kroužek Butovice
- 1913 Sportovní klub Butovice
- 1930 SK Praha XVII
- 1948 Sokol Jinonice
- 1949 Sokol Šverma Jinonice
- 1953 DSO Spartak Praha Motorlet
- 1969 TJ Motorlet Praha
- 199? SSK Motorlet Praha
- 1994 FC Patenidis Motorlet Praha
- 2000 SK Motorlet Praha
- 2011 FK Motorlet Praha
