= FK Loko Prague =

- Full name: Fotbalový klub Loko Praha, z.s.
- Founded: 1898; 128 years ago
- Ground: Stadion Lokomotiva Praha
- Capacity: 3,000 (1,500 seated)
- Chairman: Michal Plachý
- Manager: Boris Kočiško
- League: Bohemian Football League A
- 2025–26: 10th
- Website: https://www.fklokopraha.cz/

FK Loko Prague (formerly FK Loko Vltavín) is a Czech football club located in Holešovice, Prague. It currently plays in the Bohemian Football League, which is the third tier of the Czech football system.

== History ==
Club logo until 2024

Club logo until 2005

The club played in the Czech Fourth Division for six seasons between 2003 and 2009 until winning group A in June 2009. At the same time, the club's B team was promoted from the I.A class to the Prague Championship. In 2013, they won the Bohemian Football League. The club played in the 2013–14 Czech National Football League, scoring their first-ever goal in the competition in a 1–0 victory against Vlašim in August 2013. The club found themselves ten points away from safety with four matches of the season remaining. Their relegation was confirmed in May 2014 after a 2–1 loss to FK Baník Sokolov.

== Honours ==
- Bohemian Football League (third tier)
  - Champions: 2012–13
