= Prague Championship =

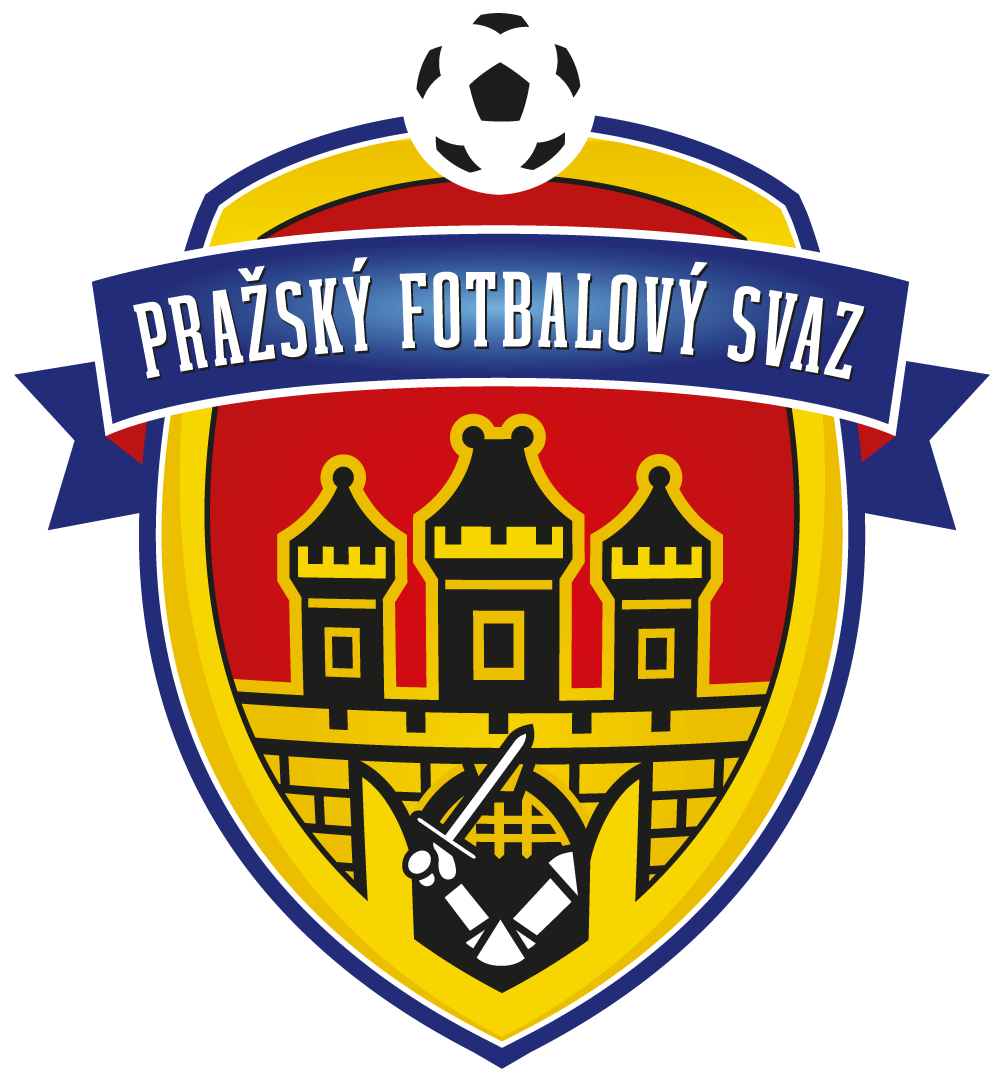
- Founded: 1993
- Country: Czech Republic
- Confederation: UEFA
- Number of clubs: 16
- Level on pyramid: 5
- Promotion to: Divize B
- Relegation to: I.A class
- Domestic cup: Czech Cup
- Current champions: Viktoria Žižkov B (2025–2026)
- Current: 2025–2026

The Veolia Pražská Teplárenská Men Championship (Czech: Veolia Pražská Teplárenská Přebor Mužů) is a football competition for teams in the Prague metropolitan area of the Czech Republic. The competition is organized by the Prague Football Association (Czech: Pražský fotbalový svaz) and is one of the regional leagues that make up the Czech football league system.

== History ==
The Prague Football Championship was founded in 1919, shortly after the formation of the Czechoslovak Republic. The competition initially consisted of teams from Prague and its surrounding areas, and was one of the top regional leagues in the country.

In the early years, the championship was dominated by the biggest Prague clubs such as Sparta Prague, Slavia Prague and DFC Prag. However, as the competition grew, more and more smaller clubs began to participate, leading to a more diverse range of winners.

During the Communist era, the Prague Football Championship was merged with other regional leagues to form the Central Bohemian Championship. However, following the Velvet Revolution of 1989, the competition was re-established as a separate entity.

== Format ==
The Prague Football Championship is currently the top league in the region of Prague, with promotion and relegation between them. The top division is the Prague Football League, which consists of 16 teams. The second division also called 1. Class, which consists of 16 teams, and so on.

At the end of each season, the champion is promoted one division above, while the 2 bottom teams are relegated to the division below.

== Prague championship clubs, 2025–26 ==
Club	Previous season
FC Slavoj Vyšehrad	2nd
Sokol Kolovraty	5th
SK Střešovice 1911	4th
FK Dukla Jižní Město	7th
SK Motorlet Prague B	10th
FC Zličín	3rd
FK Viktoria Žižkov B	8th
SK Třeboradice	12th
SK Čechie Uhříněves	13th
SK Aritma Prague B	9th
SK Slovan Kunratice	11th
Spartak Kbely	6th
SC Olympia Radotín	1st in Class 1.A (group B)
AFK Slavoj Podolí Prague	2nd in Class 1.A (group A)
FK Admira Prague B	15th in Czech Fourth Division (Division B)

== Prague Championship champions ==
Season	Winners	Runners-up
2004–05	H.Měcholupy	Dukla Prague
2005–06	Admira Prague	Přední Kopanina
2006–07	H.Měcholupy	Dukla Prague
2007–08	Meteor Prague	Přední Kopanina
2008–09	Přední Kopanina	Dukla Prague B
2009–10	Zličín	Radotín
2010–11	Radotín	Dukla Prague B
2011–12	Aritma Prague	Bohemians Prague B
2012–13	Union Vršovice	Libuš
2013–14	Sokol Královice	Libuš
2014–15	Přední Kopanina	Uhelné sklady Prague
2015–16	Přední Kopanina	Bohemians Prague (Střížkov)
2016–17	FK Motorlet Prague B	Třeboradice
2017–18	Třeboradice	Dukla Jižní Město
2018–19	Újezd Prague 4	Sokol Královice
2019–20	Admira Prague B	Újezd Prague 4
2020–21	Admira Prague B	Motorlet Prague B
2021–22	Újezd Prague 4	Dukla Jižní Město
2022–23	Spoje Prague	Dukla Jižní Město
2023–24	Přední Kopanina	Tempo Prague
2024–25	Spoje Prague	Slavoj Vyšehrad
2025–26	Viktoria Žižkov B	Slavoj Vyšehrad
