= FK Admira Prague =

- Full name: Fotbalový klub Admira Praha
- Nickname: Black-White horses
- Founded: 1909; 117 years ago
- Ground: Stadion FK Admira Praha
- Capacity: 2,000 (700 seated)
- Chairman: Milan Golas
- Manager: Vasil Boev
- League: Bohemian Football League, Gr. A
- 2025–26: 5th
- Website: https://www.fkadmira.info/
Home colours

FK Admira Prague is a Czech football club located in Prague-Kobylisy, Czech Republic. It currently plays in the Bohemian Football League, which is the third level of competition in the country. They played two seasons in the Bohemian Football League, but were relegated in the 2014–15 season, then promoted back in 2019. The biggest rival of this club is FK Meteor Prague VIII.

== Historical names ==
Sources:

- 1909 – SK Meteor Kobylisy (Sportovní klub (Sports club) Meteor Kobylisy)
- 1920 – SK Praha XVI (Sportovní klub (Sports club) Praha XVI)
- 1931 – SK Praha VIII (Sportovní klub (Sports club) Praha VIII)
- 1940 – merged with SK Rapid VIII => SK Praha VIII (Sportovní klub (Sports club) Praha VIII)
- 1948 – merged with SK Admira VIII => TJ Dynamo-vozovna Praha (Tělovýchovná jednota (Physical education unity) Dynamo-vozovna Praha)
- 1968 – TJ Admira Praha 8 (Tělovýchovná jednota (Physical education unity) Admira Praha 8)
- 1978 – TJ Admira Kobylisy (Tělovýchovná jednota (Physical education unity) Kobylisy)
- 1992 – merged with TJ Slavoj Praha 7 => FK Admira/Slavoj (Fotbalový klub (Football club) Admira/Slavoj)
- 2006 – FK Admira Praha (Fotbalový klub (Football club) Admira Praha)

== Reserves ==
Admira's reserve team plays in Division B (season 2022/23).

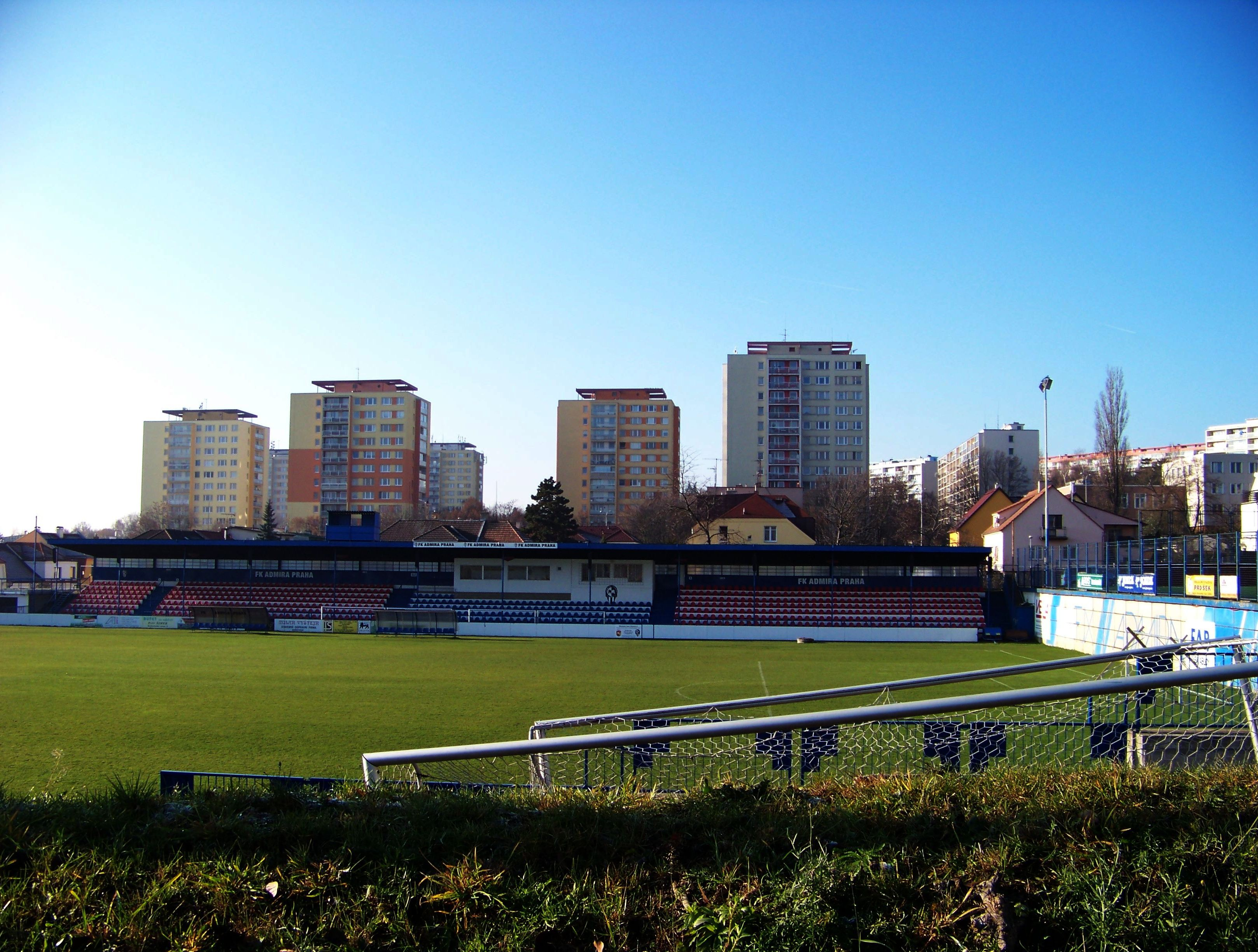
The playing field in Kobylisy

== Honours ==
- Czechoslovak Regional Competition (third tier)
  - Champions: 1959–60
- Czech Fourth Division
  - Champions: 1995–96, 2012–13, 2018–19
- Prague Championship (fifth tier)
  - Champions: 1971–72, 1992–93, 2005–06

== Season-by-season record ==
=== A–team ===
Season	Division	Level	Position	Notes
Protectorate of Bohemia and Moravia (1939–1945)
1939/40	Central Bohemian Division	2	10th	
1940/41	Central Bohemian Division	2	3rd	
1941/42	Central Bohemian Division	2	3rd	
1942/43	Central Bohemian Division	2	8th	
1943/44	Central Bohemian Division	2	10th	
Czechoslovakia (1945–1993)
1945/46	Central Bohemian Division	2	5th	
1946/47	Central Bohemian Division	2	11th	
1947/48	Central Bohemian Division	2	10th	
1948	Country Competition, Gr. A	2	11th	
1949	Regional Competition, Gr. B	2	8th	Reorganization of competitions
1950	Regional Competition, Gr. B	3	8th	Reorganization of competitions
1951	Prague Regional Competition, Gr. A	2	9th	Relegated
...
1959–60	Regional Competition, Gr. A	3	1st	Promoted
1960–61	Second League, Gr. B	2	12th	Relegated
...
1964–65	Prague Championship	3	2nd	Reorganization of competitions
1965–66	Division B	3	11th	
1966–67	Division B	3	9th	
1967–68	Division B	3	11th	
1968–69	Division C	3	9th	Reorganization of competitions
1969–70	Division B	4	12th	
1970–71	Division B	4	14th	Relegated
1971–72	Prague Championship	5	1st	Promoted
1972–73	Division B	4	8th	
1973–74	Division C	4	2nd	
1974–75	Division B	4	7th	
1975–76	Division C	4	8th	
1976–77	Division B	4	3rd	Reorganization of competitions
1977–78	Division B	3	4th	
1978–79	Division C	3	8th	
1979–80	Division B	3	8th	
1980–81	Division A	3	9th	Reorganization of competitions
1981–82	Division B	4	9th	
1982–83	Division B	4	10th	
1983–84	Division C	4	8th	
1984–85	Division B	4	12th	
1985–86	Division C	4	7th	
1986–87	Division C	4	12th	
1987–88	Division C	4	4th	
1988–89	Division B	4	16th	Relegated
...
1992–93	Prague Championship	5	1st	Promoted
Czech Republic (1993– )
1993–94	Division C	4	6th	
1994–95	Division C	4	8th	
1995–96	Division A	4	1st	Promoted
1996–97	Bohemian Football League	3	13th	
1997–98	Bohemian Football League	3	15th	
1998–99	Bohemian Football League	3	2nd	
1999–00	Bohemian Football League	3	10th	
2000–01	Bohemian Football League	3	3rd	
2001–02	Bohemian Football League	3	8th	
2002–03	Bohemian Football League	3	17th	Relegated
2003–04	Division	4	?	Relegated
2004–05	Prague Championship	5	5th	
2005–06	Prague Championship	5	1st	Promoted
2006–07	Division B	4	6th	
2007–08	Division A	4	7th	
2008–09	Division A	4	4th	
2009–10	Division B	4	4th	
2010–11	Division B	4	5th	
2011–12	Division C	4	11th	
2012–13	Division A	4	1st	Promoted
2013–14	Bohemian Football League	3	9th	
2014–15	Bohemian Football League	3	16th	Relegated
2015–16	Division C	4	3rd	
2016–17	Division A	4	3rd	
2017–18	Division C	4	12th	
2018–19	Division A	4	1st	Promoted
2019–20	Bohemian Football League, Gr. A	3	10th	Season abandoned
2020–21	Bohemian Football League, Gr. A	3	5th	Season abandoned
2021–22	Bohemian Football League, Gr. A	3	7th	
2022–23	Bohemian Football League, Gr. A	3	5th	
2023–24	Bohemian Football League, Gr. A	3		

=== Reserve team ===
Season	Division	Level	Position	Notes
Czech Republic (2009– )
2009–10	Prague I. B Class, Gr. B	7	4th	
2010–11	Prague I. B Class, Gr. B	7	1st	Promoted
2011–12	Prague I. A Class, Gr. A	6	2nd	
2012–13	Prague I. A Class, Gr. A	6	1st	Promoted
2013–14	Prague Championship	5	11th	
2014–15	Prague Championship	5	11th	
2015–16	Prague Championship	5	10th	
2016–17	Prague Championship	5	10th	
2017–18	Prague Championship	5	3rd	
2018–19	Prague Championship	5	7th	
2019–20	Prague Championship	5	1st	Season abandoned
2020–21	Prague Championship	5	1st	Season abandoned
2021–22	Prague Championship	5	5th	Promoted
2022–23	Division B	4	13th	
2023–24	Division B	4		
