= FK Neratovice-Byškovice =

Association football club in the Czech Republic

Neratovice-Byškovice
- Full name: FK Neratovice-Byškovice s.r.o.
- Founded: 2006; 20 years ago
- Ground: Hlavní stadion Neratovice
- Chairman: Vladimír Kaňka
- Manager: Jiří Brunclík
- League: Bohemian Football League B
- 2025–26: 12th
- Website: https://www.fknb.cz/
Home colours	Away colours

FK Neratovice-Byškovice is a Czech football club located in the town of Neratovice. From 2025, it plays in the Bohemian Football League.

== History ==
In the summer of 2011, the club was promoted to the Czech Fourth Division administratively, following a third-placed finish in the regional championship and the withdrawal of the Příbram B team from competitive football. In the 2024–25 season, the club won the Divize B group of the Czech Fourth Division and was promoted to the Bohemian Football League.

Neratovice-Byškovice reached the third round of the Czech Cup for the first time in 2026. They defeated SK Kosmonosy 4–1 in the preliminary round, subsequently recording a 10–1 win against Klášterce nad Ohří in the first round and a penalty shootout win after a 1–1 draw against Benátky nad Jizerou in the second round of the competition, all away from home.
