= FC Zličín =

Zličín
- Full name: Fotbalový klub FC Zličín, z.s.
- Founded: 1929
- Ground: areál FC Zličín
- Chairman: Jan Roubíček
- Manager: Michal Švejda
- League: Prague Championship
- 2025–26: 4th
Home colours

FC Zličín is a football club located in Prague-Zličín, Czech Republic. It currently plays in the Prague Championship.

Former club logo

== Honours ==
- Prague Championship (fifth tier)
  - Champions 2009–10
