= FC Slavoj Vyšehrad =

- Full name: Football club Slavoj Vyšehrad a.s.
- Nickname: Šemíci
- Founded: 1907; 119 years ago
- Ground: Stadion Slavoj Vyšehrad
- Capacity: 2,500
- Chairman: Jaroslav Klíma
- Manager: Roman Bednář
- League: Prague Championship
- 2025–26: 2nd (promoted)
- Website: https://www.slavojvysehrad.cz/
Home colours

FC Slavoj Vyšehrad is a football club in Prague-Nusle, Czech Republic, and named after Vyšehrad. The club used to play in the 2nd and 3rd tiers of the Czech football system. In 2022, after a corruption scandal, the club was reassigned to the Prague Championship (5th tier).

== History ==
The club was founded in 1907 and plays its home matches at the 2,500-capacity Stadion Slavoj Vyšehrad.

=== Notable coaches ===
- Dušan Uhrin, Jr. (1994–1997)
- Jan Berger senior (2009)

=== Seasons ===
- 2003/04: Divize B – 6
- 2004/05: Divize B – 10
- 2005/06: Divize B – 7
- 2006/07: Divize A – 1
- 2007/08: ČFL – 12
- 2008/09: ČFL – 16
- 2009/10: ČFL – 17
- 2010/11: Divize B – 4
- 2011/12: Divize B – 7
- 2012/13: Divize B – 2
- 2013/14: Divize B – 2
- 2014/15: ČFL – 3
- 2015/16: FNL – 15
- 2016/17: ČFL – 13
- 2017/18: ČFL – 14
- 2018/19: ČFL – 1
- 2019/20: FNL – 12
- 2020/21: FNL – 14
- 2021/22: ČFL – 16, group A (relegated to Prague Championship after a corruption scandal)
- 2025/26: Prague Championship – 2

== Notable former players ==
The following players have played senior international football:

- Lukáš Došek, Czech national football team
- Zdeněk Hruška, Czech national team (FIFA World Cup 1982)
- Marek Kincl, Czech national team
- Petr Kouba, Czech national team (UEFA Euro 1996)
- Luděk Macela, Czech national team (1980 Summer Olympics)
