= Czech Republic football league system =

League competition

The Czech Republic football league system is a series of interconnected leagues for club football in the Czech Republic.

== The system ==
=== 2022–23 ===
Below shows how the current system works. For each division, its English name, official name or sponsorship name (which often differs radically from its official name) and number of clubs is given. Each division promotes to the division(s) that lie directly above them and relegates to the division(s) that lie directly below them.

Two clubs are relegated and promoted from the Czech First League and Czech National Football League respectively each season.

One club is promoted from both the ČFL and the MSFL to replace the two relegated teams from the Czech National Football League.

Winners of Czech Divisions A, B and C are promoted to the ČFL and winners of Czech Divisions D, E and F are promoted to the MFSL. Depending on the regional locations of the teams relegated from Czech 2. Liga the number of teams promoted and relegated from the ČFL and MFSL can vary from season to season.

Below the six 4th divisions, there are 14 regional divisions, the winners of which are promoted to the corresponding 4th division. Promotion from 5th to 4th level not necessarily follows the path in the table below (this is mainly the case of Central Bohemian Region), teams are placed to particular divisions according to their location/FA decision. Clubs from Bohemia (regions below Divisions A/B/C) can't play with clubs from Moravia-Silesia (Divisions D/E/F) though.

Level Clubs	League(s)/Division(s)														
1; 16	1st Division; 16 clubs LFA														
2; 16	Czech National Football League; 16 clubs LFA														
3; 50	Bohemian Football League A Česká fotbalová liga A (ČFL); 16 clubs					Bohemian Football League B Česká fotbalová liga B (ČFL); 16 clubs					Moravian–Silesian Football League; Moravskoslezská fotbalová liga (MSFL); 18 clubs				
4; 90	Division A 16 clubs				Division B 16 clubs			Division C 16 clubs			Division D 14 clubs		Division E 14 clubs		Division F 14 clubs
5; 216	Regional Championship; Karlovy Vary; 14 clubs	Regional Championship; Plzeň; 16 clubs	Regional Championship; South Bohemian; 16 clubs	Regional Championship; Prague; 16 clubs	Regional Championship; Central Bohemian; 16 clubs		Regional Championship; Ústí nad Labem; 16 clubs	Regional Championship; Liberec; 14 clubs	Regional Championship; Hradec Králové; 16 clubs	Regional Championship; Pardubice; 16 clubs	Regional Championship; South Moravian; 16 clubs	Regional Championship; Vysočina; 14 clubs	Regional Championship; Zlín; 14 clubs	Regional Championship; Olomouc; 16 clubs	Regional Championship; Moravian-Silesian; 16 clubs
6; 330	I.A Class; 14 clubs	I.A Class; 16 clubs	I.A Class; Group A 14 clubs Group B 14 clubs	I.A Class; Group A 14 clubs Group B 14 clubs	I.A Class; Group A 16 clubs Group B 16 clubs		I.A Class; Group A 14 clubs Group B 14 clubs	I.A Class; 14 clubs	I.A Class; 16 clubs	I.A Class; 14 clubs	I.A Class; Group A 14 clubs Group B 14 clubs	I.A Class; Group A 14 clubs Group B 14 clubs	I.A Class; Group A 14 clubs Group B 14 clubs	I.A Class; Group A 14 clubs Group B 14 clubs	I.A Class; Group A 14 clubs Group B 14 clubs
7; 550	I.B Class; 14 clubs	I.B Class; Group A 14 clubs Group B 14 clubs Group C 14 clubs	I.B Class; Group A 14 clubs Group B 14 clubs Group C 14 clubs Group D 14 clubs	I.B Class; Group A 14 clubs Group B 14 clubs	I.B Class; Group A 14 clubs Group B 14 clubs Group C 14 clubs Group D 14 clubs Group E 14 clubs		I.B Class; Group A 14 clubs Group B 14 clubs Group C 14 clubs	I.B Class; East; 14 clubs West; 14 clubs	I.B Class; Group A+B; 16 clubs Group C+D; 16 clubs	I.B Class; Group A 14 clubs Group B 14 clubs	I.B Class; Group A 14 clubs Group B 14 clubs Group C 14 clubs	I.B Class; Group A 14 clubs Group B 14 clubs	I.B Class; Group A 14 clubs Group B 14 clubs Group C 14 clubs	I.B Class; Group A 14 clubs Group B 14 clubs Group C 14 clubs	I.B Class; Group A 14 clubs Group B 14 clubs Group C 14 clubs Group D 14 clubs
8; 1090 9; 1370 10; 1034	Cheb; II. Class; 1 group III. Class; 1 group Karlovy Vary; II. Class; 1 group III. Class; 1 group IV. Class; 1 group Sokolov; II. Class; 1 group	Domažlice; II. Class; 1 group III. Class; 1 group IV. Class; 1 group Klatovy; II. Class; 1 group III. Class; 1 group IV. Class; 2 groups Plzeň-city; II. Class; 1 group III. Class; 1 group Plzeň-south; II. Class; 1 group III. Class; 1 group IV. Class; 1 group Plzeň-north; II. Class; 1 group III. Class; 1 group IV. Class; 2 groups Rokycany; II. Class; 1 group III. Class; 1 group Tachov; II. Class; 1 group III. Class; 1 group IV. Class; 3 groups	České Budějovice; II. Class; 1 group III. Class; 2 groups IV. Class; 1 group Český Krumlov; II. Class; 1 group III. Class; 1 group Jindřichův Hradec; II. Class; 1 group III. Class; 2 groups Písek; II. Class; 1 group III. Class; 1 group IV. Class; 1 group Prachatice; II. Class; 1 group III. Class; 1 group Strakonice; II. Class; 1 group III. Class; 1 group IV. Class; 1 group Tábor; II. Class; 1 group III. Class; 1 group IV. Class; 2 groups	II. Class; 4 groups III. Class; 3 groups	Benešov; II. Class; 1 group III. Class; 2 groups IV. Class; 4 groups Beroun; II. Class; 1 group III. Class; 2 groups IV. Class; 2 groups Kladno; II. Class; 1 group III. Class; 2 groups IV. Class; 2 groups Kolín; II. Class; 1 group III. Class; 2 groups IV. Class; 3 groups Kutná Hora; II. Class; 1 group III. Class; 1 group IV. Class; 2 groups Mělník; II. Class; 1 group III. Class; 2 groups IV. Class; 2 groups	Mladá Boleslav; II. Class; 1 group III. Class; 2 groups IV. Class; 1 group Nymburk; II. Class; 1 group III. Class; 2 groups IV. Class; 3 groups Praha-east; II. Class; 1 group III. Class; 2 groups IV. Class; 3 groups Praha-west; II. Class; 1 group III. Class; 2 groups IV. Class; 3 groups Příbram; II. Class; 1 group III. Class; 2 groups IV. Class; 3 groups Rakovník; II. Class; 1 group III. Class; 1 group IV. Class; 1 group	Chomutov; II. Class; 1 group III. Class; 1 group Děčín; II. Class; 1 group III. Class; 1 group Litoměřice; II. Class; 1 group III. Class; 2 groups IV. Class; 2 groups Louny; II. Class; 1 group III. Class; 1 group IV. Class; 2 groups Most; II. Class; 1 group Teplice; II. Class; 1 group III. Class; 1 group Ústí nad Labem; II. Class; 1 group III. Class; 1 group	Česká Lípa; II. Class; 1 group III. Class; 1 group Jablonec nad Nisou; II. Class; 1 group III. Class; 1 group Liberec; II. Class; 1 group III. Class; 2 groups Semily; II. Class; 1 group III. Class; 2 groups	Hradec Králové; II. Class; 1 group III. Class; 1 group IV. Class; 2 groups Jičín; II. Class; 1 group III. Class; 1 group Náchod; II. Class; 1 group III. Class; 1 group Rychnov nad Kněžnou; II. Class; 1 group III. Class; 1 group IV. Class; 1 group Trutnov; II. Class; 1 group III. Class; 1 group IV. Class; 1 group	Chrudim; II. Class; 1 group III. Class; 1 group IV. Class; 1 group Pardubice; II. Class; 1 group III. Class; 2 groups IV. Class; 2 groups Svitavy; II. Class; 1 group III. Class; 1 group IV. Class; 1 group Ústí nad Orlicí; II. Class; 1 group III. Class; 1 group IV. Class; 1 group	Blansko; II. Class; 1 group III. Class; 1 group IV. Class; 1 group Břeclav; II. Class; 1 group III. Class; 2 groups IV. Class; 3 groups Brno-city; II. Class; 1 group III. Class; 1 group Brno-country; II. Class; 1 group III. Class; 2 groups IV. Class; 3 groups Hodonín; II. Class; 1 group III. Class; 2 groups IV. Class; 2 groups Vyškov; II. Class; 1 group III. Class; 2 groups IV. Class; 2 groups Znojmo; II. Class; 1 group III. Class; 2 groups IV. Class; 4 groups	Havlíčkův Brod; II. Class; 1 group III. Class; 1 group IV. Class; 2 groups Jihlava; II. Class; 1 group III. Class; 1 group IV. Class; 2 groups Pelhřimov; II. Class; 1 group III. Class; 1 group IV. Class; 1 group Třebíč; II. Class; 1 group III. Class; 2 groups IV. Class; 2 groups Žďár nad Sázavou; II. Class; 1 group III. Class; 1 group IV. Class; 2 groups	Kroměříž; II. Class; 1 group III. Class; 3 groups Uherské Hradiště; II. Class; 1 group III. Class; 2 groups IV. Class; 2 groups Vsetín; II. Class; 1 group III. Class; 1 group IV. Class; 2 groups Zlín; II. Class; 1 group III. Class; 2 groups IV. Class; 3 groups	Jeseník; II. Class; 1 group Olomouc; II. Class; 1 group III. Class; 1 group IV. Class; 2 groups Přerov; II. Class; 1 group III. Class; 2 groups Prostějov; II. Class; 1 group III. Class; 1 group IV. Class; 1 group Šumperk; II. Class; 1 group III. Class; 2 groups	Bruntál; II. Class; 1 group III. Class; 2 groups Frýdek-Místek; II. Class; 1 group III. Class; 1 group Karviná; II. Class; 2 groups Nový Jičín; II. Class; 1 group III. Class; 3 groups Opava; II. Class; 1 group III. Class; 2 groups IV. Class; 2 groups Ostrava-city; II. Class; 1 group III. Class; 1 group

== See also ==
- Regions of the Czech Republic
- Districts of the Czech Republic

== Cup competitions ==
Clubs at the top four levels are eligible for cup competitions.

- Czech Cup (MOL Cup)
- Czech Supercup (Community Shield)
