= Bohemian Football League =

3. Česká fotbalová liga
- Founded: 1991
- Country: Czech Republic
- Confederation: UEFA
- Number of clubs: 17+17
- Level on pyramid: 3
- Promotion to: Czech National Football League
- Relegation to: Fourth Division (Divize A, B or C)
- Domestic cup: Czech Cup
- Current champions: FK Arsenal Česká Lípa

3rd Bohemian Football League (Czech: 3. Česká fotbalová liga; ČFL) is one of the third-level football leagues of the Czech Republic (the other is the Moravian-Silesian Football League). The league comprises teams from the historic Bohemia region.

== History ==
The league was formed in 1991 during the Czechoslovakia era, replacing the former II. ČNL (II. Česká národni liga; Second Czech National League) at the third tier of Czechoslovak football alongside sister league MSFL. In 2024, the league was renamed 3. Česká fotbalová liga to include a number indicating the level in the system of Czech football competitions in accordance with the new regulations.

== Competition format ==
The winner of ČFL is promoted to Czech National Football League. In total three clubs are promoted to the ČFL - the winner of Divize A, the winner of Divize B and the winner of Divize C.

The format of the league was unconventional in that it did not allow draws. As of the 2014–15 season, if a match is tied, the winner is decided by a penalty shootout. The winner of the shootout gets two points and the loser gets one. From season 2019–20 on, Junior league (with B teams of first-league clubs) was canceled and the B teams were moved into the ČFL and MSFL. The competition was divided into two groups with 16 teams in each.

Since the 2021–22 season, the teams are again awarded by 3 points for a win and 1 point for a tie.

== Bohemian Football League clubs, 2026–27 ==
=== Bohemian Football League A ===
Club	Previous season
SK Dynamo České Budějovice	Administratively relegated from FNL
AC Sparta Prague B	Relegated from FNL
TJ Jiskra Domažlice	2nd
FC Viktoria Plzeň B	3rd
FC Písek	4th
FK Králův Dvůr	5th
FK Admira Prague	6th
SK Slavia Prague C	7th
SK Aritma Prague	9th
FK Loko Prague	10th
Příbram akademie	11th
Bohemians 1905 B	12th
FK Dukla Prague B	13th
FK Motorlet Prague	14th
SK Benešov	Promoted from Divize A
Povltavská fotbalová akademie	Promoted from Divize A

=== Bohemian Football League B ===
Club	Previous season
MFK Chrudim	Administratively relegated from FNL
SK Zápy	2nd
FK Baník Most-Souš	3th
FC Hradec Králové B	4th
FK Teplice B	5th
SK Benátky nad Jizerou	6th
FK Pardubice B	7th
FK Jablonec B	8th
FK Mladá Boleslav B	9th
FC Slovan Liberec B	10th
FK Varnsdorf	11th
FK Neratovice-Byškovice	12th
SK Sokol Brozany	13th
TJ Velké Hamry	14th
FK Čáslav	Promoted from Divize C
FK Horní Ředice	Promoted from Divize C

== Bohemian Football League (ČFL) champions ==
Season	Winners	Runners-up
1991–92	TJ Liaz Jablonec nad Nisou	Chmel Blšany
1992–93	FK Chmel Blšany	TFK VTJ Teplice
1993–94	FK Armaturka Ústí nad Labem	FC Portal Příbram
1994–95	SK 1887 Chrudim	FK Pelikán Děčín
1995–96	AFK Atlantic Lázně Bohdaneč	Brummer Česká Lípa
1996–97	SK Slavia Prague B	FC MUS Most
1997–98	FK Mladá Boleslav	FK Pelikán Děčín
1998–99	SK Spolana Neratovice	FK Admira/Slavoj Prague
1999–00	FC Chomutov	SK Sparta Krč
2000–01	FK Mogul Kolín	FK Bohemians Prague (Střížkov)
2001–02	AC Sparta Prague B	Tatran Prachatice
2002–03	TJ Tatran Prachatice	SK Slavia Prague B
2003–04	MFK Ústí nad Labem	FK Náchod-Deštné
2004–05	FC Slovan Liberec B	SC Xaverov
2005–06	FC Zenit Čáslav	SK Slovan Varnsdorf
2006–07	FC Bohemians Prague	SK Sparta Krč
2007–08	AC Sparta Prague B	FK Sezimovo Ústí
2008–09	Vlašim	FC Písek
2009–10	FK Sezimovo Ústí	TJ Sokol Ovčáry
2010–11	FC Bohemians Prague	FK Mladá Boleslav B
2011–12	MFK Chrudim	FK Pardubice
2012–13	Loko Vltavín	FK Kolín
2013–14	FK Kolín	SK Viktorie Jirny
2014–15	FK Bohemians Prague (Střížkov)	TJ Jiskra Domažlice
2015–16	SK Viktorie Jirny	SK Zápy
2016–17	SK Viktorie Jirny	FC Olympia Hradec Králové
2017–18	MFK Chrudim	Loko Vltavín
2018–19	FK Slavoj Vyšehrad	SK Zápy
2019–20	–	–
2020–21	–	–
2021–22	SK Slavia Prague B	SK Zápy
2022–23	FK Viktoria Žižkov	TJ Jiskra Domažlice
2023–24	SK Slavia Prague B	FC Slovan Velvary
2024–25	FK Viagem Ústí nad Labem	TJ Jiskra Domažlice
2025–26	FK Arsenal Česká Lípa	SK Kladno
