= SK Aritma Prague =

Aritma Prague
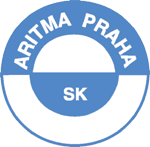
- Full name: SK Aritma Prague
- Founded: 1908
- Ground: Areál SK Aritma; Nad Lávkou 5 Prague 6 – Vokovice
- Capacity: 2,000
- Chairman: Ladislav Adamec
- Manager: Ladislav Prošek
- League: Bohemian Football League – Gr. A
- 2025–26: 9th
Home colours

SK Aritma Prague is a Czech football club located in Prague-Vokovice. It currently plays in the Bohemian Football League. It has several youth academy teams.

== Stadium ==
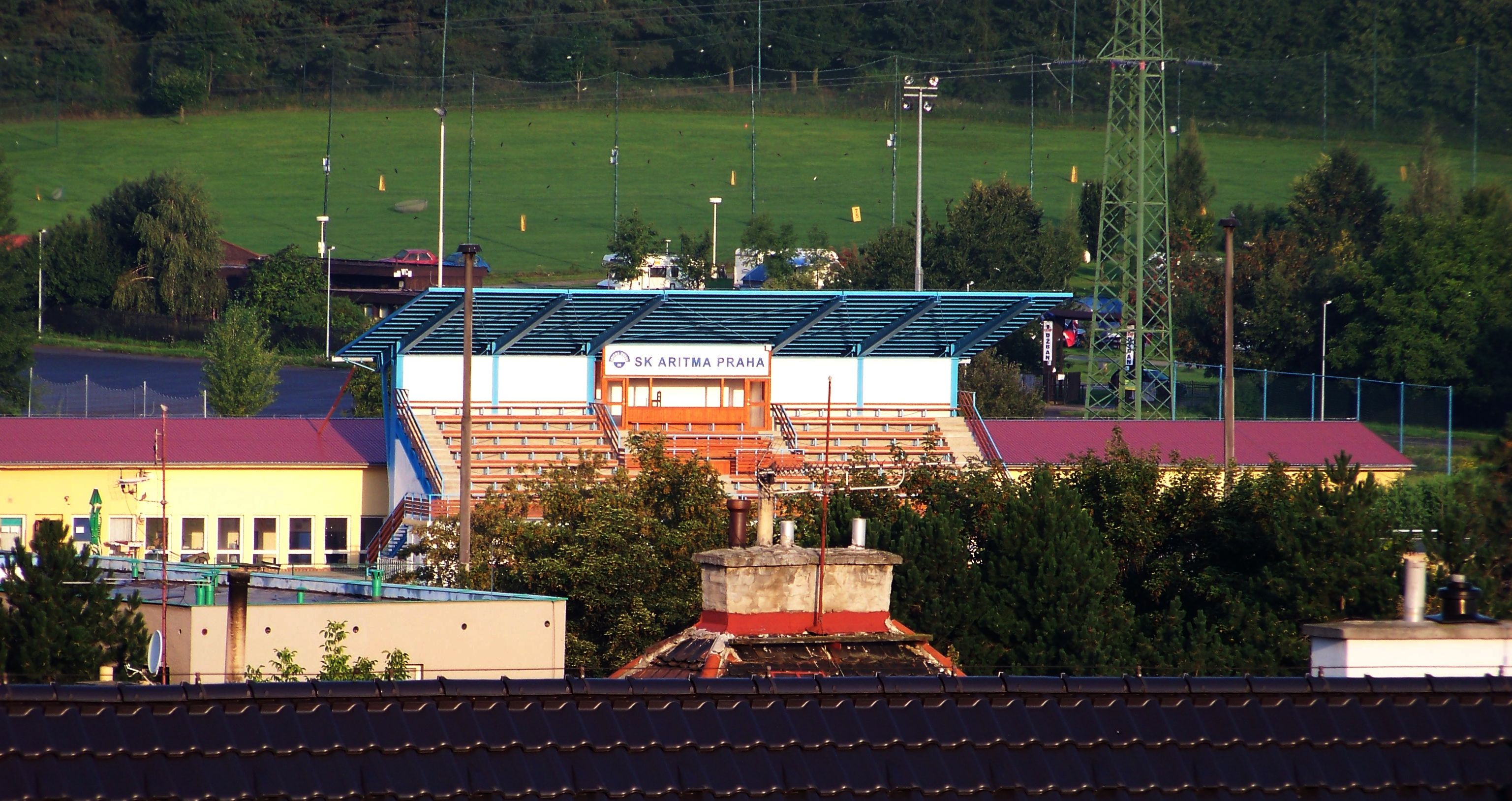
Tribüne des SK Aritma Praha

SK Aritma Praha plays its home matches at Stadion SK Aritma, located in the Vokovice district of Prague. The stadium has a capacity of approximately 2,000 spectators.
