= Czech Fourth Division =

Football league in the Czech Republic

- Country: Czech Republic
- Confederation: UEFA
- Number of clubs: 96 (in 6 groups)
- Level on pyramid: 4
- Promotion to: ČFL; MSFL
- Relegation to: Level 5 (Prague Championship or regional championships)
- Domestic cup: Czech Cup
- Website: A, B, C D, E, F

The Czech Fourth Division (Czech: Divize) is the fourth tier of football in the Czech Republic. The level consists of six divisions, named Divize A-F, each holding 16 teams. The top teams from Divize A, B and C are promoted to the Bohemian Football League while the top teams from Divize D, E and F are promoted to the Moravian–Silesian Football League. The number of relegated teams varies between the divisions, the destination of the relegated teams is one of the 14 Regional Divisions at level 5 of the pyramid.

Between the 2014–15 season and the end of the 2020–21 season, the format of the three Bohemian divisions (A, B and C) differed, in that it did not allow draws. If a match is tied, the winner was decided by a penalty shootout. The winner of the shootout got two points and the loser got one. In July 2021, points were reset to 3 points for a win and 1 point for a draw.

== Fourth Division clubs, 2024–25 ==
=== Divize A ===
Club	Town	Region
FK Příbram B	Příbram	Central Bohemian
FK Slavoj Český Krumlov	Český Krumlov	South Bohemian
TJ Hluboká nad Vltavou	Hluboká nad Vltavou	South Bohemian
TJ Přeštice	Přeštice	Plzeň
SK Senco Doubravka	Plzeň	Plzeň
FK Králův Dvůr	Králův Dvůr	Central Bohemian
SK Slavia Vejprnice	Vejprnice	Plzeň
SK Aritma Prague	Prague	Prague
FK Jindřichův Hradec 1910	Jindřichův Hradec	South Bohemian
FC Rokycany	Rokycany	Plzeň
TJ Jiskra Domažlice B	Domažlice	Plzeň
FK Komárov	Komárov	Central Bohemian
FK Petřín Plzeň B	Plzeň	Plzeň
TJ Spartak Soběslav	Soběslav	South Bohemian
SK Hořovice	Hořovice	Central Bohemian
TJ Ligmet Milín	Milín	Central Bohemian

=== Divize B ===
Club	Town	Region
SK Český Brod	Český Brod	Central Bohemian
FK Meteor Prague VIII	Prague	Prague
FC Tempo Prague	Prague	Prague
FC Viktoria Mariánské Lázně	Mariánské Lázně	Karlovy Vary
FC Přední Kopanina	Prague	Prague
FC Slavia Karlovy Vary	Karlovy Vary	Karlovy Vary
FK Olympie Březová	Březová	Karlovy Vary
SK Slaný	Slaný	Central Bohemian
FK Neratovice-Byškovice	Neratovice	Central Bohemian
SK Újezd Praha 4	Prague	Prague
FK Ústí nad Labem - mládež	Ústí nad Labem	Ústí nad Labem
FK Ostrov	Ostrov	Karlovy Vary
TJ SK Hřebeč	Hřebeč	Central Bohemian
FK Admira Prague B	Prague	Prague
SK Štětí	Štětí	Ústí nad Labem
FK Baník Sokolov	Sokolov	Karlovy Vary

=== Divize C ===
Club	Town	Region
RMSK Cidlina Nový Bydžov	Nový Bydžov	Hradec Králové
FC Hlinsko	Hlinsko	Pardubice
FC Slavia Hradec Králové	Hradec Králové	Hradec Králové
SK Kosmonosy	Kosmonosy	Central Bohemian
FK Dobrovice	Dobrovice	Central Bohemian
FK Přepeře	Přepeře	Liberec
TJ Velké Hamry	Velké Hamry	Liberec
FK Benešov	Benešov	Central Bohemian
FK Turnov	Turnov	Liberec
Spartak Police nad Metují	Police nad Metují	Hradec Králové
FK Brandýs nad Labem	Brandýs nad Labem	Central Bohemian
MFK Trutnov	Trutnov	Hradec Králové
SK Vysoké Mýto	Vysoké Mýto	Pardubice
MFK Chrudim B	Chrudim	Pardubice
FK Slovan Hrádek nad Nisou 1910	Hrádek nad Nisou	Liberec
FK Horní Ředice	Horní Ředice	Pardubice

=== Divize D ===
Club	Town	Region
FC Slovan Havlíčkův Brod	Havlíčkův Brod	Vysočina
FC Žďas Žďár nad Sázavou	Žďár nad Sázavou	Vysočina
MSK Břeclav	Břeclav	South Moravian
AFC Humpolec	Humpolec	Vysočina
TJ Tatran Bohunice	Brno	South Moravian
TJ Sokol Tasovice	Tasovice	South Moravian
FC Spartak Velká Bíteš	Velká Bíteš	Vysočina
TJ Dálnice Speřice	Jiřice	Vysočina
TJ Sokol Lanžhot	Lanžhot	South Moravian
SK Tatran Ždírec nad Doubravou	Ždírec nad Doubravou	Vysočina
FC Kuřim	Kuřim	South Moravian
SK Líšeň B	Brno	South Moravian
Slavoj Polná	Polná	Vysočina
SK Fotbalová škola Třebíč	Třebíč	Vysočina
FC Velké Meziříčí	Velké Meziříčí	Vysočina
SFK Vrchovina Nové Město na Moravě	Nové Město na Moravě	Vysočina

=== Divize E ===
Club	Town	Region
1. HFK Olomouc	Olomouc	Olomouc
FC Kvasice	Kvasice	Zlín
SK Baťov 1930	Otrokovice	Zlín
FK Nové Sady	Olomouc	Olomouc
SFK Holešov	Holešov	Zlín
FK Kozlovice	Kozlovice	Moravian-Silesian
FK Skaštice	Skaštice	Zlín
FK Šumperk	Šumperk	Olomouc
TJ Slovan Bzenec	Bzenec	South Moravian
TJ Tatran Všechovice	Všechovice	Olomouc
FC TVD Slavičín	Slavičín	Zlín
SK Hranice	Hranice	Olomouc
FC Vsetín	Vsetín	Zlín
FK Šternberk	Šternberk	Olomouc
FC Kostelec na Hané	Kostelec na Hané	Olomouc
TJ Valašské Meziříčí	Valašské Meziříčí	Zlín

=== Divize F ===
Club	Town	Region
1. BFK Frýdlant nad Ostravicí	Frýdlant nad Ostravicí	Moravian-Silesian
FC Vratimov	Vratimov	Moravian-Silesian
FK Bospor Bohumín	Bohumín	Moravian-Silesian
FK Krnov	Krnov	Moravian-Silesian
FK Nový Jičín	Nový Jičín	Moravian-Silesian
MFK Havířov	Havířov	Moravian-Silesian
MFK Vítkovice	Ostrava	Moravian-Silesian
SFC Opava B	Opava	Moravian-Silesian
SK Beskyd Frenštát p. R.	Frenštát pod Radhoštěm	Moravian-Silesian
SK Jiskra Rýmařov	Rýmařov	Moravian-Silesian
SK Polanka nad Odrou	Ostrava	Moravian-Silesian
Sport-Club Pustá Polom	Pustá Polom	Moravian-Silesian
SSK Bílovec	Bílovec	Moravian-Silesian
TJ Kovohut Břidličná	Břidličná	Moravian-Silesian
TJ Petřvald na Moravě	Petřvald na Moravě	Moravian-Silesian
TJ Řepiště	Řepiště	Moravian-Silesian
