= 2005–06 FK Most season =

Most
2005–06 season
- Manager: Přemysl Bičovský (until 13 December 2005); Zdeněk Ščasný (from 13 December 2005)
- Stadium: Fotbalový stadion Josefa Masopusta
- Czech First League: 10th
- Czech Cup: Second round
- Top goalscorer: League: Horst Siegl (9); All: Horst Siegl (9)
- Highest home attendance: 11,729 v Teplice (7 August 2005, Czech First League)
- Lowest home attendance: 2,492 v Slovan Liberec (26 November 2005, Czech First League)
- Average home league attendance: 5,402
- Biggest win: 4–0 v Baník Ostrava (Home, 22 August 2005, Czech First League)
- Biggest defeat: 0–3 v Slavia Prague (Home, 15 October 2005, Czech First League); 0–3 v Jablonec (Away, 23 November 2005, Czech First League); 0–3 v Sparta Prague (Home, 12 December 2005, Czech First League); 0–3 v Slavia Prague (Away, 1 April 2006, Czech First League)
Home colours	Away colours

The 2005–06 season was Fotbalový klub Most's first ever season in the Czech top flight, competed under the sponsorship name FK SIAD Most. In addition to the domestic league, Most participated in this season's editions of the Czech Cup.

== Squad ==
Squad at end of season

Note: Flags indicate national team as defined under FIFA eligibility rules; some limited exceptions apply. Players may hold more than one non-FIFA nationality.

No.	Pos.	Nation	Player
1	GK	CZE	Martin Svoboda
2	DF	FRA	Gael Suares
3	MF	SVK	Michal Gašparík
4	DF	CAN	André Hainault
5	MF	BLR	Vitali Trubila
6	MF	CZE	Martin Hruška
7	MF	CZE	Radek Čížek
8	MF	CZE	Tomáš Pilař
9	MF	CZE	Michal Macek
10	FW	CZE	Horst Siegl
11	FW	CZE	Adam Brzezina
12	DF	CZE	Aleš Škerle (on loan from Sigma Olomouc)
13	FW	FRA	Alexandre Mendy

No.	Pos.	Nation	Player
14	DF	CZE	Jan Procházka
15	MF	CZE	Martin Zbončák
16	DF	CZE	Jiří Novotný
17	MF	CZE	Lukáš Schut
18	DF	CZE	Ladislav Jamrich
19	MF	CZE	Jaroslav Škoda
20	GK	SVK	Jaroslav Beláň
21	MF	CZE	Petr Jendruščák
23	MF	CZE	Aleš Pikl
24	FW	CZE	Martin Boček
25	DF	CIV	Arnaud Kouyo
29	GK	CZE	Daniel Hykl

== Competitions ==
=== Overview ===
Competition	First match	Last match	Starting round	Final position	Record							
Competition	First match	Last match	Starting round	Final position	Pld	W	D	L	GF	GA	GD	Win %
Czech First League	7 August 2005	13 May 2006	Matchday 1	10th	30	10	6	14	34	41	−7	33.33
Czech Cup	31 August 2005	31 August 2005	Second round	Second round	1	0	0	1	1	2	−1	0.00
Total					31	10	6	15	35	43	−8	32.26

Source: Competitions

=== Czech First League ===
==== League table ====
Pos	Team	Pld	W	D	L	GF	GA	GD	Pts
8	Jablonec	30	10	7	13	35	39	−4	37 (Note: Jablonec ahead of Most on head-to-head record; Jablonec–Sigma Olomouc 1–2, Sigma Olomouc–Jablonec 0–2.)
9	Sigma Olomouc	30	10	7	13	34	44	−10	37
10	Most	30	10	6	14	34	41	−7	36
11	Tescoma Zlín	30	8	11	11	27	33	−6	35 (Note: Tescoma Zlín ahead of Brno on head-to-head record; Tescoma Zlín–Brno 2–0, Brno–Tescoma Zlín 1–1.)
12	Brno	30	7	14	9	35	36	−1	35

Source: Fortuna liga
Rules for classification: 1) points; 2) head-to-head points; 3) head-to-head goal difference; 4) head-to-head goals scored; 5) goal difference; 6) number of goals scored.

==== Results summary ====
Overall								Home						Away					
Pld	W	D	L	GF	GA	GD	Pts	W	D	L	GF	GA	GD	W	D	L	GF	GA	GD
30	10	6	14	34	41	−7	36	9	2	4	24	18	+6	1	4	10	10	23	−13

==== Results by round ====
Round	1	2	3	4	5	6	7	8	9	10	11	12	13	14	15	16	17	18	19	20	21	22	23	24	25	26	27	28	29	30
Ground	H	A	H	A	H	A	H	A	H	A	H	A	H	H	A	H	A	H	A	H	A	H	A	H	A	H	A	A	H	A
Result	W	L	W	L	W	L	L	L	L	L	D	L	W	L	L	L	D	W	W	W	D	W	L	W	D	W	L	D	D	L
Position	3	7	3	7	5	6	8	11	11	14	14	14	13	14	16	16	16	16	12	11	11	10	10	10	9	7	9	8	9	10
Points	3	3	6	6	9	9	9	9	9	9	10	10	13	13	13	13	14	17	20	23	24	27	27	30	31	34	34	35	36	36

A = Away; H = Home; W = Win; D = Draw; L = Loss

==== Matches ====
7 August 2005 1	Most	2–1	Teplice	Most
	Poláček 7'; Houšt (yellow card) 39'; Macek (yellow card) 41'; Škoda (yellow card) 45'; Boček (yellow card) 74'; Hunal 88' (o.g.)	Report	Verbíř 2'; Rilke (yellow card) 12'; Klein (yellow card) 20' (red card) 26'	Stadium: Fotbalový stadion Josefa Masopusta; Attendance: 11,729; Referee: Jaroslav Jára; Assistant referees: Patrik Filípek, Ivan Pokorný

13 August 2005 2	Sparta Prague	2–1	Most	Prague
	Poborský 24' (pen.); Sivok 38'; Slepička (yellow card) 53'	Report	Jendruščák (yellow card) 19'; Poláček (yellow card) 43'; Pilař 45'; Houšt (yellow card) 70'; Čížek (yellow card) 90'	Stadium: Toyota Arena; Attendance: 7,782; Referee: Jaroslav Jára; Assistant referees: Patrik Filípek, Ivan Pokorný

22 August 2005 3	Most	4–0	Baník Ostrava	Most
	Macek 33'; Siegl 63', 85'; Procházka (yellow card) 77'; Boček 90'	Report	Čížek (yellow card) 55'; Cigánek (yellow card) 90'	Stadium: Fotbalový stadion Josefa Masopusta; Attendance: 6,724; Referee: Tomáš Čuřín; Assistant referees: Miroslav Zlámal, Josef Pinkas

27 August 2005 4	Slovácko	2–1	Most	Uherské Hradiště
	Malár 24', (yellow card) 53'; Ivana 79', (yellow card) 79'; Ordoš (yellow card) 90'	Report	Pilař 17'; Houšt (yellow card) 32'; Novotný (yellow card) 52'; Škoda (yellow card) 53'; Brzezina (yellow card) 78'	Stadium: Městský fotbalový stadion Miroslava Valenty; Attendance: 5,294; Referee: Radek Matějek; Assistant referees: Martin Wilczek, Antonín Kurdula

11 September 2005 5	Most	3–1	Blšany	Most
	Škoda 28'; Siegl 33'; Brzezina 65'; Procházka (yellow card) 77'	Report	Bílek (yellow card) 10'; Kolář 53'; Dort (yellow card) 60'; Pleško (yellow card) 90'	Stadium: Fotbalový stadion Josefa Masopusta; Attendance: 6,430; Referee: Jiří Jech; Assistant referees: Petr Petřík, Josef Košec

18 September 2005 6	Vysočina Jihlava	1–0	Most	Jihlava
	Perniš 14'; Zúbek (yellow card) 30'; Vladyka (yellow card) 38'; Heide (yellow card) 67'	Report	Škerle (yellow card) 44'; Škoda (yellow card) 56'; Pilař (yellow card) 90'	Stadium: Stadion v Jiráskově ulici Attendance: 2,150; Referee: Jaroslav Jára; Assistant referees: Miroslav Zlámal, Ivan Pokorný

26 September 2005 7	Most	0–2	Sigma Olomouc	Most
	Škoda (yellow card) 54'; Macek (yellow card) 69'	Report	Hubník (yellow card) 39'; Onofrej 45'; Randa 66'	Stadium: Fotbalový stadion Josefa Masopusta; Attendance: 6,127; Referee: Jiří Jiřík; Assistant referees: Libor Novák, Luděk Lhoták

2 October 2005 8	Viktoria Plzeň	2–1	Most	Plzeň
	Rada (yellow card) 42'; Vágner 56'; Limberský 79'; Barteska (yellow card) 90'	Report	Macek (yellow card) 63'; Novotný (yellow card) 81'; Čížek 85'; Houšt (yellow card) 89'	Stadium: Štruncovy Sady Stadion; Attendance: 3,203; Referee: Jan Jílek; Assistant referees: Miroslav Tulinger, Petr Hojsík

15 October 2005 9	Most	0–3	Slavia Prague	Most
	Čížek (yellow card) 79'; Svoboda (yellow card) 90'	Report	Krajčík (yellow card) 7'; Švento (yellow card) 29'; Latka (yellow card) 31'; Fořt 62'; Hrdlička 64', (yellow card) 77'; Pešír (yellow card) 88'; Jarolím 90' (pen.)	Stadium: Fotbalový stadion Josefa Masopusta; Attendance: 6,729; Referee: Tomáš Adámek; Assistant referees: Milan Ondo, Vladimír Goňa

30 October 2005 11	Most	0–0	Tescoma Zlín	Most
	Macek (yellow card) 67'	Report	Lukaštík (yellow card) 15'; Pikl (yellow card) 57'; Janíček (yellow card) 74'	Stadium: Fotbalový stadion Josefa Masopusta; Attendance: 4,920; Referee: Dagmar Damková; Assistant referees: Miroslav Zlámal, Luděk Lhoták

6 November 2005 12	Mladá Boleslav	1–0	Most	Mladá Boleslav
	Ševínský (yellow card) 78'; Miller (yellow card) 90'; Palát 90'	Report	Škerle (yellow card) 49'; Procházka (yellow card) 55' (red card) 57'; Novotný (yellow card) 90'	Stadium: Městský stadion Attendance: 4,111; Referee: Libor Kovařík; Assistant referees: Miroslav Tulinger, Emil Ubias

20 November 2005 13	Most	1–0	Marila Příbram	Most
	Škoda (yellow card) 53'; Brzezina 71'; Siegl (yellow card) 86'	Report	Pařízek (yellow card) 63'; Čupr (yellow card) 72'	Stadium: Fotbalový stadion Josefa Masopusta; Attendance: 3,496; Referee: Luboš Helebrant; Assistant referees: Vitězslav Holub, Jiří Kavka

23 November 2005 10	Jablonec	3–0	Most	Jablonec nad Nisou
	Pončák (yellow card) 9'; Smíšek 12'; Michálek 34', 67'	Report	Jamrich (yellow card) 19'; Novotný (yellow card) 56'; Sitarčík (yellow card) 57'; Siegl (yellow card) 90'	Stadium: Stadion Střelnice; Attendance: 2,285; Referee: Jiří Adam; Assistant referees: Petr Hojsík, Václav Chytil

26 November 2005 14	Most	1–2	Slovan Liberec	Most
	Houšt (yellow card) 18'; Brzezina 55' (pen.); Siegl (yellow card) 81'; Procházka (yellow card) 85'	Report	Hološko 48', 81'; Zápotočný (yellow card) 55'; Hološko (yellow card) 71'; Papoušek (yellow card) 88'	Stadium: Fotbalový stadion Josefa Masopusta; Attendance: 2,492; Referee: Jaroslav Jára; Assistant referees: Miroslav Zlámal, Miroslav Tulinger

4 December 2005 15	Brno	1–0	Most	Brno
	Besta 61'	Report	Sitarčík (yellow card) 45'; Škoda (yellow card) 64'; Novotný (yellow card) 68'; Boček (yellow card) 80'	Stadium: Městský fotbalový stadion Srbská; Attendance: 1,880; Referee: Jaroslav Jára; Assistant referees: Miroslav Zlámal, Miroslav Tulinger

12 December 2005 16	Most	0–3	Sparta Prague	Most
	Novotný (yellow card) 41'; Procházka (yellow card) 63'; Škoda (yellow card) 74'	Report	Zelenka 11'; Pospěch (yellow card) 51', (goal) 90'; Šimák (yellow card) 60'; Matušovič 72'	Stadium: Fotbalový stadion Josefa Masopusta; Attendance: 2,612; Referee: Pavel Královec; Assistant referees: Josef Pinkas, Luděk Lhoták

26 February 2006 18	Most	3–2	Slovácko	Most
	Švejnoha 9' (o.g.); Novotný (yellow card) 50'; Siegl 53'; Hainault 88'; Brzezina (yellow card) 89'	Report	Lysoněk (yellow card) 39'; Polách 60' (pen.), (yellow card) 82'; Švejnoha 66'; Drobisz (yellow card) 88'; Rajnoch (yellow card) 88'	Stadium: Fotbalový stadion Josefa Masopusta; Attendance: 3,462; Referee: Libor Kovařík; Assistant referees: Miroslav Tulinger, Ivan Pokorný

5 March 2006 19	Blšany	0–1	Most	Blšany
	Devátý (yellow card) 19'	Report	Hainault (yellow card) 25'; Siegl 82'	Stadium: FK Chmel Blšany; Attendance: 2,053; Referee: Radek Matějek; Assistant referees: Martin Wilczek, Jan Filgas

12 March 2006 20	Most	2–1	Vysočina Jihlava	Most
	Pikl (yellow card) 37', (goal) 57'; Brzezina 63'; Novotný (yellow card) 90'	Report	Lovětínský 18'; Rzeszoto (yellow card) 28'; Šourek (yellow card) 63'	Stadium: Fotbalový stadion Josefa Masopusta; Attendance: 2,794; Referee: Radek Příhoda; Assistant referees: Martin Večeřa, Otakar Draštík

19 March 2006 21	Sigma Olomouc	1–1	Most	Olomouc
	Kovář 21' (pen.), (yellow card) 32'; König (yellow card) 29'; Onofrej (yellow card) 43'	Report	Procházka (yellow card) 15'; Pikl 17'; Pilař (yellow card) 35'; Svoboda (yellow card) 73'	Stadium: Andrův stadion Attendance: 3,760; Referee: Michal Paták; Assistant referees: Luděk Lhoták, Vladimír Goňa

23 March 2006 17	Baník Ostrava	0–0	Most	Ostrava
	Besta (yellow card) 42'; Magera (yellow card) 59'; Čížek (yellow card) 68'	Report	Procházka (yellow card) 67'	Stadium: Bazaly; Attendance: 2,820; Referee: Jan Jílek; Assistant referees: Václav Chytil, Roman Kumstát

26 March 2006 22	Most	1–0	Viktoria Plzeň	Most
	Siegl (yellow card) 20'; Procházka (yellow card) 20'; Jendruščák 45'; Pilař (yellow card) 65'; Hainault (yellow card) 67'; Mendy (yellow card) 80'	Report	Fillo (yellow card) 18'; Rada (yellow card) 30'; Smola (yellow card) 47' (red card) 50'; Limberský (yellow card) 90'	Stadium: Fotbalový stadion Josefa Masopusta; Attendance: 4,193; Referee: Dagmar Damková; Assistant referees: Miroslav Zlámal, Petr Hojsík

1 April 2006 23	Slavia Prague	3–0	Most	Prague
	Fořt 36', (red card) 68'; Hrdlička (yellow card) 43'; Hubáček (yellow card) 46'; Piták 62' (pen.); Kalivoda 76'	Report	Gašparík (yellow card) 37'; Svoboda (yellow card) 62'; Brzezina (yellow card) 80'	Stadium: Stadion Evžena Rošického; Attendance: 2,134; Referee: Oldřich Racek; Assistant referees: Josef Košec, Vladimír Goňa

9 April 2006 24	Most	3–0	Jablonec	Most
	Mendy 12', 70'; Pikl 18'	Report	Glos (yellow card) 61'; Baranek (yellow card) 79'	Stadium: Fotbalový stadion Josefa Masopusta; Attendance: 5,625; Referee: Jiří Adam; Assistant referees: Václav Chytil, Petr Slavík

15 April 2006 25	Tescoma Zlín	1–1	Most	Zlín
	Zbožínek 52'; Švach (yellow card) 72'; Lukaštík (yellow card) 82'	Report	Procházka 35', (yellow card) 90'	Stadium: Letná Stadion; Attendance: 2,071; Referee: Michal Paták; Assistant referees: Libor Novák, Dušan Pospíšil

23 April 2006 26	Most	1–0	Mladá Boleslav	Most
	Novotný (yellow card) 59'; Škerle (yellow card) 72'; Pikl 84'	Report	Vít (yellow card) 21'	Stadium: Fotbalový stadion Josefa Masopusta; Attendance: 6,910; Referee: Michal Paták; Assistant referees: Otakar Draštík, Roman Kumstát

26 April 2006 27	Marila Příbram	1–0	Most	Příbram
	Frejlach 9'; Penner (yellow card) 58'; Gruber (yellow card) 73'; Mácha (yellow card) 88'	Report	Pilař (yellow card) 73'; Čížek (yellow card) 85'; Siegl (yellow card) 90'	Stadium: Na Litavce; Attendance: 1,932; Referee: Jiří Jech; Assistant referees: Otakar Draštík, Milan Ondo

29 April 2006 28	Slovan Liberec	1–1	Most	Liberec
	Blažek 20'; Hamouz (yellow card) 75'; Janů (yellow card) 88'	Report	Gašparík (yellow card) 39'; Novotný (yellow card) 71'; Siegl 89'	Stadium: Stadion u Nisy; Attendance: 6,583; Referee: Tomáš Adámek; Assistant referees: Luděk Lhoták, Petr Hojsík

10 May 2006 29	Most	3–3	Brno	Most
	Siegl 7', 10', (yellow card) 83'; Jendruščák 45'; Brzezina (yellow card) 59'; Čížek (yellow card) 68'; Kouyo (yellow card) 85'	Report	Besta 22', 25'; Simr 39'	Stadium: Fotbalový stadion Josefa Masopusta; Attendance: 6,792; Referee: Jan Jílek; Assistant referees: Miroslav Zlámal, Ivan Pokorný

13 May 2006 30	Teplice	4–3	Most	Teplice
	Krmaš (yellow card) 15', (goal) 43'; Verbíř (yellow card) 33', (goal) 34', 39'; Fenin 73'	Report	Gašparík 16'; Zbončák (yellow card) 28'; Siegl (yellow card) 47', (goal) 57'; Mendy 60'; Novotný (yellow card) 90'	Stadium: Na Stínadlech; Attendance: 5,112; Referee: Libor Kovařík; Assistant referees: Patrik Filípek, Martin Večeřa

=== Czech Cup ===
31 August 2005 Second round	Kladno	2–1	Most	Kladno
	Neuwirth 17'; Kalina 90+1'	Report	Jendruščák 45'	Stadium: Stadion Františka Kloze; Attendance: 1,200; Referee: Příhoda

== Statistics ==
=== Overall ===
Appearances (Apps) numbers are for appearances in competitive games only, including sub appearances.

No.	Player	Pos.	Czech First League				Czech Cup				Total			
No.	Player	Pos.	Apps	Goal	Booked	Sent off (straight red)	Apps	Goal	Booked	Sent off (straight red)	Apps	Goal	Booked	Sent off (straight red)
1	(Czech Republic) Martin Svoboda	GK	30		3		1				31		3	
2	(France) Gael Suares	DF	1								1			
3	(Czech Republic) Michal Gašparík	MF	13	1	2						13	1	2	
3	(Czech Republic) Zdeněk Houšt	DF	13		5		1				14		5	
4	(Canada) André Hainault	DF	13	1	2						13	1	2	
4	(Czech Republic) Richard Sitarčík	DF	9		2		1				10		2	
5	(Czech Republic) Václav Štípek	FW	2								2			
5	(Belarus) Vitali Trubila	MF	1								1			
6	(Czech Republic) Martin Hruška	MF	7								7			
6	(Czech Republic) Tomáš Poláček	MF	4	1	1						4	1	1	
7	(Czech Republic) Radek Čížek	MF	24	1	4		1				25	1	4	
8	(Czech Republic) Tomáš Pilař	MF	29	2	4		1				30	2	4	
9	(Czech Republic) Michal Macek	MF	23	1	4		1				24	1	4	
10	(Czech Republic) Horst Siegl	FW	29	9	7		1				30	9	7	
11	(Czech Republic) Adam Brzezina	FW	26	4	4		1				27	4	4	
12	(Czech Republic) Aleš Škerle	DF	29		3						29		3	
13	(France) Alexandre Mendy	FW	14	3	1						14	3	1	
13	(Czech Republic) Roman Švrček	DF	2								2			
14	(Czech Republic) Jan Procházka	DF	22	1	9	1	1				23	1	9	1
15	(Czech Republic) Martin Zbončák	MF	11		1						11		1	
16	(Czech Republic) Jiří Novotný	DF	26		11		1				27		11	
17	(Czech Republic) Lukáš Schut	MF	1								1			
18	(Czech Republic) Ladislav Jamrich	DF	4		1						4		1	
19	(Czech Republic) Jaroslav Škoda	MF	18	1	7		1				19	1	7	
20	(Slovakia) Jaroslav Beláň	GK	1								1			
21	(Czech Republic) Petr Jendruščák	MF	28	2	1		1	1			29	3	1	
23	(Czech Republic) Aleš Pikl	MF	11	4	1						11	4	1	
24	(Czech Republic) Martin Boček	FW	11	1	2		1				12	1	2	
25	(Ivory Coast) Arnaud Kouyo	DF	4		1						4		1	
25	(Czech Republic) Tomáš Kulvajt	FW	7				1				8			
Own goals				2								2		
Totals				34	76	1		1				35	76	1

=== Clean sheets ===
			Clean sheets		
No.	Player	Games Played	Czech First League	Czech Cup	Total
1	(Czech Republic) Martin Svoboda	31	8		8
20	(Slovakia) Jaroslav Beláň	1			
Totals			8		8

Source: Competitions
