= 2002–03 UEFA Cup first round =

The first round of the 2002–03 UEFA Cup was contested between 17 September and 3 October 2002. A total of 96 teams participated in this round, with the 48 winners advancing to the second round.

== Format ==
In the first round, each tie was played over two legs, with each team playing one leg at home. The team that scored more goals on aggregate over the two legs advanced to the next round. If the aggregate score was level, the away goals rule was applied, i.e., the team that scored more goals away from home over the two legs advanced. If away goals were also equal, then thirty minutes of extra time were played, divided into two fifteen-minute halves. The away goals rule was again applied after extra time, i.e., if there were goals scored during extra time and the aggregate score was still level, the visiting team advanced by virtue of more away goals scored. If no goals were scored during extra time, the tie was decided by penalty shoot-out.

== Qualified teams ==
The first round involved 96 teams: 39 directly qualified for this round (including the three Intertoto Cup winners), 41 advancing from the qualifying round, and 16 losers from the Champions League third qualifying round.

Key to colours
Winners of first round advanced to second round

First round participants

| Team | Notes | Coeff. |
|---|---|---|
| (Italy) Lazio | | 106.334 |
| (Italy) Parma | | 91.334 |
| (England) Chelsea | | 83.729 |
| (England) Leeds United | | 76.729 |
| (Spain) Celta Vigo | | 76.233 |
| (Portugal) Porto | | 66.124 |
| (France) Bordeaux | | 63.176 |
| (Greece) Panathinaikos | | 57.058 |
| (Spain) Alavés | | 55.233 |
| (Germany) VfB Stuttgart | | 53.495 |
| (Germany) Hertha BSC | | 52.495 |
| (France) Paris Saint-Germain | | 51.176 |
| (Spain) Real Betis | | 49.233 |
| (Czech Republic) Sparta Prague | | 48.312 |
| (Czech Republic) Slavia Prague | | 47.312 |
| (Germany) Schalke 04 | | 46.495 |
| (Germany) Werder Bremen | | 46.495 |
| (Scotland) Rangers | | 46.062 |
| (Greece) PAOK | | 41.058 |
| (Belgium) Anderlecht | | 38.762 |
| (Austria) Sturm Graz | | 37.625 |
| (Portugal) Boavista | | 36.124 |
| (Scotland) Celtic | | 36.062 |
| (England) Ipswich Town | | 35.729 |

| Team | Notes | Coeff. |
|---|---|---|
| (Croatia) Dinamo Zagreb | | 35.520 |
| (Spain) Málaga | | 34.233 |
| (Portugal) Sporting CP | | 34.124 |
| (Netherlands) Vitesse | | 30.082 |
| (Italy) Chievo | | 29.334 |
| (Switzerland) Grasshopper | | 29.312 |
| (Czech Republic) Slovan Liberec | | 29.312 |
| (England) Blackburn Rovers | | 28.729 |
| (England) Fulham | | 27.729 |
| (Netherlands) Heerenveen | | 27.082 |
| (Israel) Hapoel Tel Aviv | | 26.666 |
| (Turkey) Beşiktaş | | 26.362 |
| (Austria) GAK | | 25.625 |
| (Denmark) Copenhagen | | 24.687 |
| (Switzerland) Servette | | 24.312 |
| (Ukraine) Shakhtar Donetsk | | 23.979 |
| (Greece) Iraklis | | 23.058 |
| (Croatia) Varteks | | 22.520 |
| (Poland) Wisła Kraków | | 21.750 |
| (France) Lorient | | 21.176 |
| (Netherlands) Utrecht | | 21.082 |
| (Denmark) Brøndby | | 20.687 |
| (Turkey) Fenerbahçe | | 19.362 |
| (Turkey) Kocaelispor | | 19.362 |

| Team | Notes | Coeff. |
|---|---|---|
| (Federal Republic of Yugoslavia) Red Star Belgrade | | 18.165 |
| (Greece) Skoda Xanthi | | 18.058 |
| (Poland) Legia Warsaw | | 17.750 |
| (Norway) Viking | | 17.737 |
| (Turkey) Ankaragücü | | 16.362 |
| (Poland) Amica Wronki | | 15.750 |
| (Israel) Maccabi Tel Aviv | | 15.666 |
| (Russia) CSKA Moscow | | 14.645 |
| (Russia) Zenit Saint Petersburg | | 14.645 |
| (Bulgaria) Litex Lovech | | 14.582 |
| (Bulgaria) CSKA Sofia | | 14.582 |
| (Turkey) Denizlispor | | 14.362 |
| (Czech Republic) Viktoria Žižkov | | 14.312 |
| (Federal Republic of Yugoslavia) Partizan | | 14.165 |
| (Portugal) Leixões | | 14.124 |
| (Croatia) Hajduk Split | | 13.520 |
| (Scotland) Aberdeen | | 13.062 |
| (Scotland) Livingston | | 13.062 |
| (Ukraine) Metalurh Donetsk | | 12.979 |
| (Ukraine) Metalurh Zaporizhzhia | | 12.979 |
| (Belgium) Mouscron | | 12.762 |
| (Norway) Stabæk | | 12.737 |
| (Austria) Kärnten | | 12.625 |
| (Sweden) AIK | | 12.620 |

| Team | Notes | Coeff. |
|---|---|---|
| Austria Wien | | 11.625 |
| (Bulgaria) Levski Sofia | | 11.582 |
| (Romania) Rapid București | | 10.958 |
| (Hungary) Ferencváros | | 9.874 |
| (Slovenia) Primorje | | 8.916 |
| (Slovakia) Matador Púchov | | 8.832 |
| (Poland) Polonia Warsaw | | 8.750 |
| (Denmark) Midtjylland | | 8.687 |
| (Denmark) Odense | | 8.687 |
| (Sweden) Djurgårdens IF | | 8.620 |
| (Federal Republic of Yugoslavia) Sartid | | 8.165 |
| (Hungary) Újpest | | 7.874 |
| (Cyprus) Anorthosis Famagusta | | 7.666 |
| (Romania) Național București | | 6.958 |
| (Hungary) Zalaegerszeg | | 6.874 |
| (Georgia (country)) Dinamo Tbilisi | | 6.499 |
| (Cyprus) APOEL | | 4.666 |
| (Latvia) Ventspils | | 3.582 |
| (Moldova) Zimbru Chișinău | | 3.582 |
| (Belarus) Gomel | | 2.041 |
| (Lithuania) Sūduva | | 1.915 |
| (Bosnia and Herzegovina) Željezničar | | 0.666 |
| (Bosnia and Herzegovina) Sarajevo | | 0.666 |
| (Bosnia and Herzegovina) Široki Brijeg | | 0.666 |

Notes

1. ^{QR} Winners from the qualifying round
2. ^{CL} Losers from the Champions League third qualifying round
3. ^{IC} Teams qualified via the Intertoto Cup

== Seeding ==
The draw was held on 30 August 2002 in Monaco. Before the draw, the 96 teams were divided into 48 seeded and 48 unseeded teams, based on their 2002 UEFA club coefficients. For convenience of the draw and to avoid pairing of teams from the same association, the teams were distributed into six groups of sixteen teams, each containing an equal number of seeded and unseeded teams. In the draw, a seeded team from each group was paired with an unseeded team from the same group. The first team to be drawn played the first leg at home.

| Group 1 | | Group 2 | | Group 3 | |
| Seeded | Unseeded | Seeded | Unseeded | Seeded | Unseeded |
|---|---|---|---|---|---|
| (Italy) Parma; (France) Paris Saint-Germain; (Spain) Real Betis; (Belgium) Anderlecht; (Portugal) Sporting CP; (Turkey) Beşiktaş; (Netherlands) Utrecht; (Denmark) Brøndby | (Poland) Legia Warsaw; (Russia) CSKA Moscow; (Federal Republic of Yugoslavia) Partizan; (Norway) Stabæk; (Bulgaria) Levski Sofia; (Hungary) Újpest; (Moldova) Zimbru Chișinău; (Bosnia and Herzegovina) Sarajevo | (Italy) Lazio; (Germany) Hertha BSC; (Czech Republic) Sparta Prague; (Portugal) Boavista; (England) Ipswich Town; (Netherlands) Heerenveen; (Ukraine) Shakhtar Donetsk; (Turkey) Fenerbahçe | (Greece) Skoda Xanthi; (Israel) Maccabi Tel Aviv; (Scotland) Aberdeen; (Sweden) AIK; Austria Wien; (Federal Republic of Yugoslavia) Sartid; (Romania) Național București; (Bosnia and Herzegovina) Široki Brijeg | (England) Chelsea; (Germany) VfB Stuttgart; (Scotland) Rangers; (Croatia) Dinamo Zagreb; (Netherlands) Vitesse; (Israel) Hapoel Tel Aviv; (Denmark) Copenhagen; (France) Lorient | (Norway) Viking; (Turkey) Denizlispor; (Czech Republic) Viktoria Žižkov; (Austria) Kärnten; (Romania) Rapid București; (Sweden) Djurgårdens IF; (Hungary) Zalaegerszeg; (Latvia) Ventspils |
| Group 4 | | Group 5 | | Group 6 | |
| Seeded | Unseeded | Seeded | Unseeded | Seeded | Unseeded |
| (England) Leeds United; (France) Bordeaux; (Greece) PAOK; (Austria) Sturm Graz; (Spain) Málaga; (Czech Republic) Slovan Liberec; (Switzerland) Servette; (Turkey) Kocaelispor | (Poland) Amica Wronki; (Portugal) Leixões; (Scotland) Livingston; (Ukraine) Metalurh Zaporizhzhia; (Hungary) Ferencváros; (Slovakia) Matador Púchov; (Georgia (country)) Dinamo Tbilisi; (Bosnia and Herzegovina) Željezničar | (Spain) Celta Vigo; (Greece) Panathinaikos; (Germany) Werder Bremen; (Scotland) Celtic; (Italy) Chievo; (England) Fulham; (Austria) GAK; (Poland) Wisła Kraków | (Federal Republic of Yugoslavia) Red Star Belgrade; (Bulgaria) Litex Lovech; (Croatia) Hajduk Split; (Ukraine) Metalurh Donetsk; (Slovenia) Primorje; (Denmark) Odense; (Cyprus) APOEL; (Lithuania) Sūduva | (Portugal) Porto; (Spain) Alavés; (Germany) Schalke 04; (Czech Republic) Slavia Prague; (Switzerland) Grasshopper; (England) Blackburn Rovers; (Greece) Iraklis; (Croatia) Varteks | (Turkey) Ankaragücü; (Russia) Zenit Saint Petersburg; (Bulgaria) CSKA Sofia; (Belgium) Mouscron; (Poland) Polonia Warsaw; (Denmark) Midtjylland; (Cyprus) Anorthosis Famagusta; (Belarus) Gomel |

== Summary ==
The first legs were played on 17 and 19 September, and the second legs were played on 1 and 3 October 2002.

| Team 1 | Agg. | Team 2 | 1st leg | 2nd leg |
|---|---|---|---|---|
| Paris Saint-Germain (France) | 4–0 | (Hungary) Újpest | 3–0 | 1–0 |
| Sporting CP (Portugal) | 4–6 | (Federal Republic of Yugoslavia) Partizan | 1–3 | 3–3 (a.e.t.) |
| Legia Warsaw (Poland) | 7–2 | (Netherlands) Utrecht | 4–1 | 3–1 |
| Zimbru Chișinău (Moldova) | 1–4 | (Spain) Real Betis | 0–2 | 1–2 |
| Beşiktaş (Turkey) | 7–2 | (Bosnia and Herzegovina) Sarajevo | 2–2 | 5–0 |
| CSKA Moscow (Russia) | 3–4 | (Italy) Parma | 1–1 | 2–3 |
| Levski Sofia (Bulgaria) | 5–2 | (Denmark) Brøndby | 4–1 | 1–1 |
| Anderlecht (Belgium) | 2–2 (a) | (Norway) Stabæk | 0–1 | 2–1 |
| Național București (Romania) | 3–2 | (Netherlands) Heerenveen | 3–0 | 0–2 |
| Lazio (Italy) | 4–0 | (Greece) Skoda Xanthi | 4–0 | 0–0 |
| Aberdeen (Scotland) | 0–1 | (Germany) Hertha BSC | 0–0 | 0–1 |
| Ipswich Town (England) | 2–1 | (Federal Republic of Yugoslavia) Sartid | 1–1 | 1–0 |
| Maccabi Tel Aviv (Israel) | 2–4 | (Portugal) Boavista | 1–0 | 1–4 |
| AIK (Sweden) | 4–6 | (Turkey) Fenerbahçe | 3–3 | 1–3 |
| Sparta Prague (Czech Republic) | 4–0 | (Bosnia and Herzegovina) Široki Brijeg | 3–0 | 1–0 |
| Austria Wien | 5–2 | (Ukraine) Shakhtar Donetsk | 5–1 | 0–1 |
| Denizlispor (Turkey) | 3–3 (a) | (France) Lorient | 2–0 | 1–3 |
| Chelsea (England) | 4–5 | (Norway) Viking | 2–1 | 2–4 |
| Kärnten (Austria) | 1–4 | (Israel) Hapoel Tel Aviv | 0–4 | 1–0 |
| VfB Stuttgart (Germany) | 8–2 | (Latvia) Ventspils | 4–1 | 4–1 |
| Dinamo Zagreb (Croatia) | 9–1 | (Hungary) Zalaegerszeg | 6–0 | 3–1 |
| Copenhagen (Denmark) | 1–3 | (Sweden) Djurgårdens IF | 0–0 | 1–3 |
| Viktoria Žižkov (Czech Republic) | 3–3 (a) | (Scotland) Rangers | 2–0 | 1–3 (a.e.t.) |
| Vitesse (Netherlands) | 2–1 | (Romania) Rapid București | 1–1 | 1–0 |
| Leeds United (England) | 2–1 | (Ukraine) Metalurh Zaporizhzhia | 1–0 | 1–1 |
| Servette (Switzerland) | 4–4 (a) | (Poland) Amica Wronki | 2–3 | 2–1 |
| Sturm Graz (Austria) | 8–6 | (Scotland) Livingston | 5–2 | 3–4 |
| Ferencváros (Hungary) | 5–0 | (Turkey) Kocaelispor | 4–0 | 1–0 |
| Željezničar (Bosnia and Herzegovina) | 0–1 | (Spain) Málaga | 0–0 | 0–1 |
| Bordeaux (France) | 10–1 | (Slovakia) Matador Púchov | 6–0 | 4–1 |
| Slovan Liberec (Czech Republic) | 4–2 | (Georgia (country)) Dinamo Tbilisi | 3–2 | 1–0 |
| Leixões (Portugal) | 3–5 | (Greece) PAOK | 2–1 | 1–4 |
| Litex Lovech (Bulgaria) | 1–3 | (Greece) Panathinaikos | 0–1 | 1–2 (a.e.t.) |
| Red Star Belgrade (Federal Republic of Yugoslavia) | 2–0 | (Italy) Chievo | 0–0 | 2–0 |
| Hajduk Split (Croatia) | 2–3 | (England) Fulham | 0–1 | 2–2 |
| Primorje (Slovenia) | 1–8 | (Poland) Wisła Kraków | 0–2 | 1–6 |
| APOEL (Cyprus) | 3–1 | (Austria) GAK | 2–0 | 1–1 |
| Celta Vigo (Spain) | 2–1 | (Denmark) Odense | 2–0 | 0–1 |
| Metalurh Donetsk (Ukraine) | 2–10 | (Germany) Werder Bremen | 2–2 | 0–8 |
| Celtic (Scotland) | 10–1 | (Lithuania) Sūduva | 8–1 | 2–0 |
| Porto (Portugal) | 6–2 | (Poland) Polonia Warsaw | 6–0 | 0–2 |
| Gomel (Belarus) | 1–8 | (Germany) Schalke 04 | 1–4 | 0–4 |
| Grasshopper (Switzerland) | 4–3 | (Russia) Zenit Saint Petersburg | 3–1 | 1–2 |
| Ankaragücü (Turkey) | 1–5 | (Spain) Alavés | 1–2 | 0–3 |
| Iraklis (Greece) | 5–5 (a) | (Cyprus) Anorthosis Famagusta | 4–2 | 1–3 |
| Midtjylland (Denmark) | 2–1 | (Croatia) Varteks | 1–0 | 1–1 |
| Blackburn Rovers (England) | 4–4 (a) | (Bulgaria) CSKA Sofia | 1–1 | 3–3 |
| Mouscron (Belgium) | 3–7 | (Czech Republic) Slavia Prague | 2–2 | 1–5 |

== Matches ==
19 September 2002
20:45

| Paris Saint-Germain (France) | 3–0 | (Hungary) Újpest |
|---|---|---|
| Ronaldinho 13'; Pochettino 24'; Cardetti 44' | Report |

Parc des Princes, Paris
Attendance: 21,495
Referee: Dermot Gallagher (England)
3 October 2002
19:00

| Újpest (Hungary) | 0–1 | (France) Paris Saint-Germain |
|---|---|---|
| | Report | Benachour 60' |

Megyeri úti Stadion, Budapest
Attendance: 5,964
Referee: Karel Vidlák (Czech Republic)

Paris Saint-Germain won 4–0 on aggregate.

19 September 2002
22:00

| Sporting CP (Portugal) | 1–3 | (Federal Republic of Yugoslavia) Partizan |
|---|---|---|
| Toñito 27' | Report | Hugo 12' (o.g.); Delibašić 37'; Iliev 79' |

Estádio José Alvalade, Lisbon
Attendance: 12,210
Referee: Fiorenzo Treossi (Italy)
3 October 2002
20:00

| Partizan (Federal Republic of Yugoslavia) | 3–3 (a.e.t.) | (Portugal) Sporting CP |
|---|---|---|
| Delibašić 78'; Živković 110'; Čakar 117' | Report | Toñito 13'; Kutuzov 55'; Contreras 82' |

Partizan Stadium, Belgrade
Attendance: 0 (Note: This match was played in front of an empty stadium as punishment to Partizan for earlier crowd trouble.)
Referee: Fritz Stuchlik (Austria)

Partizan won 6–4 on aggregate.

19 September 2002
19:00

| Legia Warsaw (Poland) | 4–1 | (Netherlands) Utrecht |
|---|---|---|
| Zieliński 20'; Vuković 27'; Schut 59' (o.g.); Svitlica 69' | Report | Kuyt 47' |

Polish Army Stadium, Warsaw
Attendance: 8,500
Referee: John Underhill (Scotland)
3 October 2002
20:45

| Utrecht (Netherlands) | 1–3 | (Poland) Legia Warsaw |
|---|---|---|
| Kuyt 42' | Report | Kucharski 7'; Svitlica 62', 68' (pen.) |

Stadion Galgenwaard, Utrecht
Attendance: 13,000
Referee: Edo Trivković (Croatia)

Legia Warsaw won 7–2 on aggregate.

19 September 2002
18:45

| Zimbru Chișinău (Moldova) | 0–2 | (Spain) Real Betis |
|---|---|---|
| | Report | Pérez 31'; Dinu 45+1' (o.g.) |

Stadionul Republican, Chișinău
Attendance: 8,000
Referee: Guido Wildhaber (Switzerland)
3 October 2002
21:30

| Real Betis (Spain) | 2–1 | (Moldova) Zimbru Chișinău |
|---|---|---|
| Tais 22'; Casas 29' | Report | Cebotari 31' (pen.) |

Estadio Manuel Ruíz de Lopera, Seville
Attendance: 20,204
Referee: Eric Blareau (Belgium)

Real Betis won 4–1 on aggregate.

19 September 2002
18:45

| Beşiktaş (Turkey) | 2–2 | (Bosnia and Herzegovina) Sarajevo |
|---|---|---|
| Pancu 31'; Dursun 33' | Report | Obuća 63'; Osmanhodžić 79' |

BJK İnönü Stadium, Istanbul
Attendance: 12,300
Referee: Philippe Leuba (Switzerland)
3 October 2002
19:00

| Sarajevo (Bosnia and Herzegovina) | 0–5 | (Turkey) Beşiktaş |
|---|---|---|
| | Report | Pancu 5'; İbrahim 43'; Dursun 72' (pen.); Sülün 84'; Begeçarslan 85' |

Koševo Stadium, Sarajevo
Attendance: 14,000
Referee: Attila Juhos (Hungary)

Beşiktaş won 7–2 on aggregate.

19 September 2002
18:30

| CSKA Moscow (Russia) | 1–1 | (Italy) Parma |
|---|---|---|
| Popov 67' | Report | Mutu 53' |

Saturn Stadium, Ramenskoye
Attendance: 8,653
Referee: Georgios Kasnaferis (Greece)
3 October 2002
21:00

| Parma (Italy) | 3–2 | (Russia) CSKA Moscow |
|---|---|---|
| Adriano 8'; Mutu 66', 90' | Report | Semak 37', 43' |

Stadio Ennio Tardini, Parma
Attendance: 2,394
Referee: Uriah Rennie (England)

Parma won 4–3 on aggregate.

19 September 2002
18:15

| Levski Sofia (Bulgaria) | 4–1 | (Denmark) Brøndby |
|---|---|---|
| Simonović 6', 35'; Telkiyski 51', 57' | Report | Madsen 19' |

Georgi Asparuhov Stadium, Sofia
Attendance: 11,500
Referee: Anton Stredak (Slovakia)
3 October 2002
20:15

| Brøndby (Denmark) | 1–1 | (Bulgaria) Levski Sofia |
|---|---|---|
| Jonson 73' | Report | Ivankov 9' (pen.) |

Brøndby Stadium, Brøndbyvester
Attendance: 9,456
Referee: Oleg Chikun (Belarus)

Levski Sofia won 5–2 on aggregate.

19 September 2002
20:30

| Anderlecht (Belgium) | 0–1 | (Norway) Stabæk |
|---|---|---|
| | Report | Michelsen 10' |

Constant Vanden Stock Stadium, Brussels
Attendance: 20,937
Referee: Meir Levi (Israel)
3 October 2002
20:00

| Stabæk (Norway) | 1–2 | (Belgium) Anderlecht |
|---|---|---|
| Wilhelmsson 5' | Report | De Bilde 13'; MacDonald 56' |

Ullevaal Stadion, Oslo
Attendance: 5,990
Referee: Miroslav Radoman (FR Yugoslavia)

2–2 on aggregate; Anderlecht won on away goals.

19 September 2002
19:00

| Național București (Romania) | 3–0 | (Netherlands) Heerenveen |
|---|---|---|
| Curt 9'; Ilie 29' (pen.); Olah 61' | Report |

Stadionul Cotroceni, București
Attendance: 8,000
Referee: Loizos Loizou (Cyprus)
3 October 2002
18:45

| Heerenveen (Netherlands) | 2–0 | (Romania) Național București |
|---|---|---|
| Hansson 53'; Denneboom 66' | Report |

Abe Lenstra Stadion, Heerenveen
Attendance: 12,000
Referee: Georgios Borovilos (Greece)

Național București won 3–2 on aggregate.

19 September 2002
20:45

| Lazio (Italy) | 4–0 | (Greece) Skoda Xanthi |
|---|---|---|
| Manfredini 45'; López 52'; Inzaghi 68'; César 69' | Report |

Stadio Olimpico, Rome
Attendance: 13,343
Referee: Željko Širić (Croatia)
3 October 2002
19:30

| Skoda Xanthi (Greece) | 0–0 | (Italy) Lazio |
|---|---|---|
| | Report |

Skoda Xanthi Stadium, Xanthi
Attendance: 2,790
Referee: Vladimír Hriňák (Slovakia)

Lazio won 4–0 on aggregate.

17 September 2002
18:00

| Aberdeen (Scotland) | 0–0 | (Germany) Hertha BSC |
|---|---|---|
| | Report |

Pittodrie Stadium, Aberdeen
Attendance: 10,180
Referee: Victor Esquinas Torres (Spain)
1 October 2002
17:30

| Hertha BSC (Germany) | 1–0 | (Scotland) Aberdeen |
|---|---|---|
| Preetz 89' | Report |

Olympic Stadium, Berlin
Attendance: 30,770
Referee: Grzegorz Gilewski (Poland)

Hertha BSC won 1–0 on aggregate.

19 September 2002
20:45

| Ipswich Town (England) | 1–1 | (Federal Republic of Yugoslavia) Sartid |
|---|---|---|
| Armstrong 56' | Report | Mirosavljević 32' |

Portman Road, Ipswich
Attendance: 16,933
Referee: Tomasz Mikulski (Poland)
3 October 2002
14:00

| Sartid (Federal Republic of Yugoslavia) | 0–1 | (England) Ipswich Town |
|---|---|---|
| | Report | Bent 9' (pen.) |

Fortress Stadium, Smederevo
Attendance: 13,046
Referee: Luis Medina Cantalejo (Spain)

Ipswich Town won 2–1 on aggregate.

19 September 2002
20:00

| Maccabi Tel Aviv (Israel) | 1–0 | (Portugal) Boavista |
|---|---|---|
| Dego 34' | Report |

Balgarska Armiya Stadium, Sofia, Bulgaria (Note: Due to security issues caused by the Second Intifada, Israeli teams were required to play their home matches at neutral venues until further notice.)
Attendance: 150
Referee: Luc Huyghe (Belgium)
3 October 2002
22:00

| Boavista (Portugal) | 4–1 | (Israel) Maccabi Tel Aviv |
|---|---|---|
| Strool 6' (o.g.); Jocivalter 31', 90+2'; Serginho 53' | Report | Torjman 76' |

Estádio do Bessa, Porto
Attendance: 4,500
Referee: Bernhard Brugger (Austria)

Boavista won 4–2 on aggregate.

19 September 2002
19:00

| AIK (Sweden) | 3–3 | (Turkey) Fenerbahçe |
|---|---|---|
| Nordin 19'; Andersson 67'; Rubarth 75' | Report | Revivo 16'; Johnson 26'; Stević 39' |

Råsunda Stadium, Solna
Attendance: 19,899
Referee: Ruud Bossen (Netherlands)
3 October 2002
19:45

| Fenerbahçe (Turkey) | 3–1 | (Sweden) AIK |
|---|---|---|
| Güneş 30'; Johnson 74'; Akın 90' | Report | Hoch 31' |

Şükrü Saracoğlu Stadium, Istanbul
Attendance: 21,245
Referee: Lutz Michael Fröhlich (Germany)

Fenerbahçe won 6–4 on aggregate.

19 September 2002
20:35

| Sparta Prague (Czech Republic) | 3–0 | (Bosnia and Herzegovina) Široki Brijeg |
|---|---|---|
| Pospíšil 41'; Baranek 63'; Poborský 76' | Report |

Stadion Letná, Prague
Attendance: 5,243
Referee: Dougie McDonald (Scotland)
3 October 2002
18:00

| Široki Brijeg (Bosnia and Herzegovina) | 0–1 | (Czech Republic) Sparta Prague |
|---|---|---|
| | Report | Jarošík 28' |

Stadion Pecara, Široki Brijeg
Attendance: 2,000
Referee: Tonny Poulsen (Denmark)

Sparta Prague won 4–0 on aggregate.

17 September 2002
18:00

| Austria Wien | 5–1 | (Ukraine) Shakhtar Donetsk |
|---|---|---|
| Janočko 31', 35'; Djalminha 44' (pen.); Helstad 85', 87' | Report | Belik 16' |

Ernst-Happel-Stadion, Vienna
Attendance: 13,100
Referee: Andy D'Urso (England)
1 October 2002
19:00

| Shakhtar Donetsk (Ukraine) | 1–0 | Austria Wien |
|---|---|---|
| Lewandowski 78' | Report |

Shakhtar Stadium, Donetsk
Attendance: 29,779
Referee: Paul McKeon (Republic of Ireland)

Austria Wien won 5–2 on aggregate.

19 September 2002
17:00

| Denizlispor (Turkey) | 2–0 | (France) Lorient |
|---|---|---|
| Özkan 11', 68' (pen.) | Report |

Atatürk Stadium, Denizli
Attendance: 1,800
Referee: Alan Freeland (Scotland)
3 October 2002
18:00

| Lorient (France) | 3–1 | (Turkey) Denizlispor |
|---|---|---|
| Kroupi 44'; Guel 47'; Gauvin 88' | Report | Martini 20' (o.g.) |

Stade du Moustoir, Lorient
Attendance: 8,347
Referee: Paulo Paraty (Portugal)

3–3 on aggregate; Denizlispor won on away goals.

19 September 2002
20:45

| Chelsea (England) | 2–1 | (Norway) Viking |
|---|---|---|
| Hasselbaink 44'; de Lucas 68' | Report | Wright 90+1' |

Stamford Bridge, London
Attendance: 15,772
Referee: Metin Tokat (Turkey)
3 October 2002
21:00

| Viking (Norway) | 4–2 | (England) Chelsea |
|---|---|---|
| Berre 8'; Kopteff 35'; Nevland 60', 88' | Report | Lampard 45'; Terry 62' |

Stavanger Stadion, Stavanger
Attendance: 5,555
Referee: Jack C. D. van Hulten (Netherlands)

Viking won 5–4 on aggregate.

19 September 2002
18:00

| Kärnten (Austria) | 0–4 | (Israel) Hapoel Tel Aviv |
|---|---|---|
| | Report | Halmai 36'; Welton 68'; Gershon 76'; Udi 88' |

Wörthersee Stadion, Klagenfurt
Attendance: 3,200
Referee: Nicolai Vollquartz (Denmark)
3 October 2002
19:00

| Hapoel Tel Aviv (Israel) | 0–1 | (Austria) Kärnten |
|---|---|---|
| | Report | Oberleitner 44' |

Georgi Asparuhov Stadium, Sofia, Bulgaria
Attendance: 60
Referee: Pascal Garibian (France)

Hapoel Tel Aviv won 4–1 on aggregate.

19 September 2002
18:15

| VfB Stuttgart (Germany) | 4–1 | (Latvia) Ventspils |
|---|---|---|
| Amanatidis 22'; Kurányi 33', 40'; Hleb 60' (pen.) | Report | Rimkus 65' |

Gottlieb-Daimler-Stadion, Stuttgart
Attendance: 4,417
Referee: Marian Salomir (Romania)
3 October 2002
20:15

| Ventspils (Latvia) | 1–4 | (Germany) VfB Stuttgart |
|---|---|---|
| Landyrev 16' | Report | Tiffert 23', 90'; Ganea 52'; Amanatidis 87' |

Skonto Stadium, Riga
Attendance: 2,500
Referee: Jouni Hyytiä (Finland)

VfB Stuttgart won 8–2 on aggregate.

19 September 2002
18:00

| Dinamo Zagreb (Croatia) | 6–0 | (Hungary) Zalaegerszeg |
|---|---|---|
| Marić 9'; Mitu 19'; Olić 47'; Polovanec 76'; Petrović 83', 85' | Report |

Stadion Maksimir, Zagreb
Attendance: 11,200
Referee: Georgios Douros (Greece)
3 October 2002
18:00

| Zalaegerszeg (Hungary) | 1–3 | (Croatia) Dinamo Zagreb |
|---|---|---|
| Sabo 90' | Report | Mitu 13'; Olić 41' (pen.); Mujčin 76' |

Stadion ETO, Győr
Attendance: 2,000
Referee: Sten Kaldma (Estonia)

Dinamo Zagreb won 9–1 on aggregate.

19 September 2002
20:10

| Copenhagen (Denmark) | 0–0 | (Sweden) Djurgårdens IF |
|---|---|---|
| | Report |

Parken Stadium, Copenhagen
Attendance: 18,152
Referee: Drago Kos (Slovenia)
3 October 2002
20:45

| Djurgårdens IF (Sweden) | 3–1 | (Denmark) Copenhagen |
|---|---|---|
| Albrechtsen 13' (o.g.); Elmander 45'; Källström 90' | Report | Živković 88' |

Råsunda Stadium, Solna
Attendance: 13,459
Referee: Vitaliy Hodulian (Ukraine)

Djurgårdens IF won 3–1 on aggregate.

17 September 2002
17:30

| Viktoria Žižkov (Czech Republic) | 2–0 | (Scotland) Rangers |
|---|---|---|
| Pikl 6'; Straceny 59' | Report |

Stadion Evžena Rošického, Prague
Attendance: 3,427
Referee: Julian Rodriguez Santiago (Spain)
3 October 2002
20:45

| Rangers (Scotland) | 3–1 (a.e.t.) | (Czech Republic) Viktoria Žižkov |
|---|---|---|
| de Boer 42', 58'; Arveladze 97' | Report | Lička 101' |

Ibrox Stadium, Glasgow
Attendance: 47,646
Referee: Athanassios Briakos (Greece)

3–3 on aggregate; Viktoria Žižkov won on away goals.

17 September 2002
18:00

| Vitesse (Netherlands) | 1–1 | (Romania) Rapid București |
|---|---|---|
| Peeters 62' | Report | Iencsi 90' |

Gelredome, Arnhem
Attendance: 10,850
Referee: Erol Ersoy (Turkey)
3 October 2002
20:00

| Rapid București (Romania) | 0–1 | (Netherlands) Vitesse |
|---|---|---|
| | Report | Peeters 62' |

Stadionul Giulești-Valentin Stănescu, București
Attendance: 12,500
Referee: Pasquale Rodomonti (Italy)

Vitesse won 2–1 on aggregate.

19 September 2002
20:45

| Leeds United (England) | 1–0 | (Ukraine) Metalurh Zaporizhzhia |
|---|---|---|
| Smith 80' | Report |

Elland Road, Leeds
Attendance: 30,000
Referee: Mikko Vuorela (Finland)
3 October 2002
18:00

| Metalurh Zaporizhzhia (Ukraine) | 1–1 | (England) Leeds United |
|---|---|---|
| Modebadze 24' | Report | Barmby 77' |

Meteor Stadium, Dnipropetrovsk (Note: Metalurh Zaporizhzhia played their home match at Meteor Stadium, Dnipropetrovsk, instead of their regular stadium Metalurh Stadium, Zaporizhia, due to renovation.)
Attendance: 7,000
Referee: Muhittin Boşat (Turkey)

Leeds United won 2–1 on aggregate.

19 September 2002
20:15

| Servette (Switzerland) | 2–3 | (Poland) Amica Wronki |
|---|---|---|
| Obradović 26'; Frei 59' | Report | Król 62', 85'; Zieńczuk 70' |

Charmilles Stadium, Geneva
Attendance: 2,641
Referee: Michael Weiner (Germany)
1 October 2002
18:00

| Amica Wronki (Poland) | 1–2 | (Switzerland) Servette |
|---|---|---|
| Burkhardt 60' | Report | Frei 35', 88' |

Stadion Amica, Wronki
Attendance: 1,500
Referee: Dejan Delević (FR Yugoslavia)

4–4 on aggregate; Amica Wronki won on away goals.

19 September 2002
20:30

| Sturm Graz (Austria) | 5–2 | (Scotland) Livingston |
|---|---|---|
| Wetl 37'; Szabics 50'; Dag 51'; Mujiri 57', 58' | Report | Zarate 90'; Lovell 90+2' |

Stadion Graz-Liebenau, Graz
Attendance: 2,785
Referee: Sergei Shebek (Ukraine)
3 October 2002
20:45

| Livingston (Scotland) | 4–3 | (Austria) Sturm Graz |
|---|---|---|
| Wilson 31' (pen.), 90'; Xausa 55'; Andrews 78' | Report | Szabics 45', 54'; Mujiri 48' |

Almondvale Stadium, Livingston
Attendance: 5,208
Referee: Roy Helge Olsen (Norway)

Sturm Graz won 8–6 on aggregate.

19 September 2002
18:00

| Ferencváros (Hungary) | 4–0 | (Turkey) Kocaelispor |
|---|---|---|
| Tököli 10', 90'; Lipcsei 30'; Dragóner 76' | Report |

Üllői úti stadion, Budapest
Attendance: 6,176
Referee: Valentin Ivanov (Russia)
3 October 2002
17:00

| Kocaelispor (Turkey) | 0–1 | (Hungary) Ferencváros |
|---|---|---|
| | Report | Lipcsei 30' |

İzmit Stadium, İzmit
Attendance: 520
Referee: Paulo Costa (Portugal)

Ferencváros won 5–0 on aggregate.

19 September 2002
20:30

| Željezničar (Bosnia and Herzegovina) | 0–0 | (Spain) Málaga |
|---|---|---|
| | Report |

Koševo Stadium, Sarajevo
Attendance: 8,000
Referee: Stefan Meßner (Austria)
3 October 2002
21:30

| Málaga (Spain) | 1–0 | (Bosnia and Herzegovina) Željezničar |
|---|---|---|
| Dely Valdés 7' (pen.) | Report |

La Rosaleda Stadium, Málaga
Attendance: 9,990
Referee: Ladislav Gádoši (Slovakia)

Málaga won 1–0 on aggregate.

17 September 2002
18:00

| Bordeaux (France) | 6–0 | (Slovakia) Matador Púchov |
|---|---|---|
| Sommeil 23'; Dugarry 36'; Feindouno 61'; Pauleta 67' (pen.); Vavrik 78' (o.g.); Darcheville 89' | Report |

Stade Chaban-Delmas, Bordeaux
Attendance: 12,672
Referee: Martin Hansson (Sweden)
3 October 2002
21:45

| Matador Púchov (Slovakia) | 1–4 | (France) Bordeaux |
|---|---|---|
| Mužlay 45' | Report | Sávio 14'; Darcheville 42', 88'; Feindouno 67' |

Štadión pod Dubňom, Žilina
Attendance: 2,446
Referee: Mark Halsey (England)

Bordeaux won 10–1 on aggregate.

19 September 2002
20:00

| Slovan Liberec (Czech Republic) | 3–2 | (Georgia (country)) Dinamo Tbilisi |
|---|---|---|
| Nezmar 18'; Zbončák 25'; Gyan 60' | Report | Daraselia 48'; Anchabadze 66' |

Stadion u Nisy, Liberec
Attendance: 5,100
Referee: Kostadin Kostadinov (Bulgaria)
3 October 2002
16:00

| Dinamo Tbilisi (Georgia (country)) | 0–1 | (Czech Republic) Slovan Liberec |
|---|---|---|
| | Report | Zbončák 64' |

Boris Paichadze National Stadium, Tbilisi
Attendance: 21,000
Referee: Romāns Lajuks (Latvia)

Slovan Liberec won 4–2 on aggregate.

17 September 2002
18:00

| Leixões (Portugal) | 2–1 | (Greece) PAOK |
|---|---|---|
| Carlos Brito 4'; Detinho 52' | Report | Kukiełka 25' |

Estádio do Mar, Matosinhos
Attendance: 3,492
Referee: Darko Čeferin (Slovenia)
3 October 2002
18:00

| PAOK (Greece) | 4–1 | (Portugal) Leixões |
|---|---|---|
| Salpingidis 14'; Okkas 16', 80'; Koutsopoulos 56' | Report | Pedras 81' |

Toumba Stadium, Thessaloniki
Attendance: 5,960
Referee: Edgar Steinborn (Germany)

PAOK won 5–3 on aggregate.

19 September 2002
15:45

| Litex Lovech (Bulgaria) | 0–1 | (Greece) Panathinaikos |
|---|---|---|
| | Report | Jelenković 72' (o.g.) |

Lovech Stadium, Lovech
Attendance: 4,000
Referee: Espen Berntsen (Norway)
3 October 2002
20:30

| Panathinaikos (Greece) | 2–1 (a.e.t.) | (Bulgaria) Litex Lovech |
|---|---|---|
| Warzycha 110', 120' | Report | Graf 90+1' |

Leoforos Alexandras Stadium, Athens
Attendance: 10,235
Referee: Bertrand Layec (France)

Panathinaikos won 3–1 on aggregate.

19 September 2002
20:00

| Red Star Belgrade (Federal Republic of Yugoslavia) | 0–0 | (Italy) Chievo |
|---|---|---|
| | Report |

Red Star Stadium, Belgrade
Attendance: 23,568
Referee: Laurent Duhamel (France)
3 October 2002
20:30

| Chievo (Italy) | 0–2 | (Federal Republic of Yugoslavia) Red Star Belgrade |
|---|---|---|
| | Report | Gvozdenović 70'; Milovanović 86' |

Stadio Marc'Antonio Bentegodi, Verona
Attendance: 14,807
Referee: Iouri Baskakov (Russia)

Red Star Belgrade won 2–0 on aggregate.

19 September 2002
20:00

| Hajduk Split (Croatia) | 0–1 | (England) Fulham |
|---|---|---|
| | Report | Malbranque 50' |

Stadion Poljud, Split
Attendance: 15,410
Referee: Fernando Carmona Mendez (Spain)
3 October 2002
20:45

| Fulham (England) | 2–2 | (Croatia) Hajduk Split |
|---|---|---|
| Marlet 20'; Malbranque 43' (pen.) | Report | Davis 6' (o.g.); Vejić 39' |

Loftus Road, London
Attendance: 9,162
Referee: Stefano Farina (Italy)

Fulham won 3–2 on aggregate.

19 September 2002
15:00

| Primorje (Slovenia) | 0–2 | (Poland) Wisła Kraków |
|---|---|---|
| | Report | Uche 11'; Kuźba 55' |

City Stadium, Ajdovščina
Attendance: 800
Referee: José Joâo Mendes Pratas (Portugal)
3 October 2002
19:00

| Wisła Kraków (Poland) | 6–1 | (Slovenia) Primorje |
|---|---|---|
| Żurawski 16' (pen.), 73'; Uche 51'; Trgo 55' (o.g.); Brożek 74'; Zatkovič 84' (o.g.) | Report | Zatkovič 12' |

Stadion Miejski, Kraków
Attendance: 2,340
Referee: Kristinn Jakobsson (Iceland)

Wisła Kraków won 8–1 on aggregate.

19 September 2002
19:00

| APOEL (Cyprus) | 2–0 | (Austria) GAK |
|---|---|---|
| Sztipánovics 34'; Khachatryan 70' | Report |

GSP Stadium, Nicosia
Attendance: 3,500
Referee: Yuri Klyuchnikov (Russia)
3 October 2002
20:30

| GAK (Austria) | 1–1 | (Cyprus) APOEL |
|---|---|---|
| Ehmann 43' | Report | Daskalakis 84' |

Stadion Graz-Liebenau, Graz
Attendance: 3,212
Referee: Ivan Dobrinov (Bulgaria)

APOEL won 3–1 on aggregate.

19 September 2002
21:30

| Celta Vigo (Spain) | 2–0 | (Denmark) Odense |
|---|---|---|
| Catanha 70'; McCarthy 76' | Report |

Balaídos, Vigo
Attendance: 5,837
Referee: Alexandru Tudor (Romania)
3 October 2002
20:45

| Odense (Denmark) | 1–0 | (Spain) Celta Vigo |
|---|---|---|
| Derveld 62' | Report |

Odense Stadion, Odense
Attendance: 7,051
Referee: Leslie Irvine (Northern Ireland)

Celta Vigo won 2–1 on aggregate.

19 September 2002
18:00

| Metalurh Donetsk (Ukraine) | 2–2 | (Germany) Werder Bremen |
|---|---|---|
| Tchoutang 39', 51' | Report | Lisztes 11'; Verlaat 13' |

Shakhtar Stadium, Donetsk (Note: Metalurh Donetsk played their home match at Shakhtar Stadium, Donetsk, instead of their regular stadium Metalurh Stadium, Donetsk, as it did not meet UEFA requirements.)
Attendance: 25,874
Referee: Eric Braamhaar (Netherlands)
3 October 2002
18:00

| Werder Bremen (Germany) | 8–0 | (Ukraine) Metalurh Donetsk |
|---|---|---|
| Verlaat 14'; Micoud 43', 46'; Borowski 45+1', 78'; Charisteas 51'; Klasnić 66', 90+3' | Report |

Weser-Stadion, Bremen
Attendance: 16,300
Referee: Attila Hanacsek (Hungary)

Werder Bremen won 10–2 on aggregate.

19 September 2002
20:45

| Celtic (Scotland) | 8–1 | (Lithuania) Sūduva |
|---|---|---|
| Larsson 15', 23', 29'; Petrov 27'; Sutton 35'; Lambert 50'; Hartson 71'; Valgaeren 82' | Report | Radzinevičius 90' |

Celtic Park, Glasgow
Attendance: 36,824
Referee: Miroslav Liba (Czech Republic)
3 October 2002
19:00

| Sūduva (Lithuania) | 0–2 | (Scotland) Celtic |
|---|---|---|
| | Report | Fernández 13'; Thompson 25' |

Darius and Girėnas Stadium, Kaunas
Attendance: 1,200
Referee: Ferenc Bede (Hungary)

Celtic won 10–1 on aggregate.

19 September 2002
22:30

| Porto (Portugal) | 6–0 | (Poland) Polonia Warsaw |
|---|---|---|
| Jankauskas 20', 56'; Derlei 37'; Maniche 55'; Hélder Postiga 69', 89' | Report |

Estádio das Antas, Porto
Attendance: 23,810
Referee: Hermann Albrecht (Germany)
3 October 2002
17:00

| Polonia Warsaw (Poland) | 2–0 | (Portugal) Porto |
|---|---|---|
| Łukasiewicz 67'; Kuś 81' | Report |

Wisła Stadium, Płock
Attendance: 600
Referee: Leif Sundell (Sweden)

Porto won 6–2 on aggregate.

19 September 2002
20:15

| Gomel (Belarus) | 1–4 | (Germany) Schalke 04 |
|---|---|---|
| Ivanov 61' | Report | Sand 58', 72'; Poulsen 67'; Rodríguez 73' |

Dinamo Stadium, Minsk
Attendance: 2,950
Referee: Krzysztof Słupik (Poland)
3 October 2002
15:30

| Schalke 04 (Germany) | 4–0 | (Belarus) Gomel |
|---|---|---|
| Wilmots 10'; Hanke 62', 72'; Kmetsch 67' | Report |

Arena AufSchalke, Gelsenkirchen
Attendance: 52,441
Referee: Martin Ingvarsson (Sweden)

Schalke 04 won 8–1 on aggregate.

19 September 2002
19:30

| Grasshopper (Switzerland) | 3–1 | (Russia) Zenit Saint Petersburg |
|---|---|---|
| Baturina 6'; Barijho 44'; Núñez 53' | Report | Kerzhakov 33' |

Hardturm, Zürich
Attendance: 2,300
Referee: Emil Bozinovski (Macedonia)
3 October 2002
17:00

| Zenit Saint Petersburg (Russia) | 2–1 | (Switzerland) Grasshopper |
|---|---|---|
| Kerzhakov 7', 19' | Report | Baturina 89' |

Petrovsky Stadium, Saint Petersburg
Attendance: 17,000
Referee: Orhan Erdemir (Turkey)

Grasshopper won 4–3 on aggregate.

19 September 2002
20:45

| Ankaragücü (Turkey) | 1–2 | (Spain) Alavés |
|---|---|---|
| Niculescu 30' | Report | Astudillo 43'; Navarro 81' |

Ankara 19 Mayıs Stadium, Ankara
Attendance: 7,091
Referee: Roberto Rosetti (Italy)
3 October 2002
20:30

| Alavés (Spain) | 3–0 | (Turkey) Ankaragücü |
|---|---|---|
| Dursun 6' (o.g.); Turiel 49', 75' | Report |

Mendizorrotza Stadium, Vitoria-Gasteiz
Attendance: 9,476
Referee: Sorin Corpodean (Romania)

Alavés won 5–1 on aggregate.

19 September 2002
20:15

| Iraklis (Greece) | 4–2 | (Cyprus) Anorthosis Famagusta |
|---|---|---|
| Mięciel 44'; Stoltidis 50'; Gonias 51', 88' | Report | Neophytou 61', 90' (pen.) |

Makedonikos Stadium, Thessaloniki
Attendance: 2,260
Referee: Markus Nobs (Switzerland)
3 October 2002
20:00

| Anorthosis Famagusta (Cyprus) | 3–1 | (Greece) Iraklis |
|---|---|---|
| Ketsbaia 10'; Majak 57'; Xiourouppas 82' | Report | Ederson 32' |

GSP Stadium, Nicosia
Attendance: 3,860
Referee: Lubomír Puček (Czech Republic)

5–5 on aggregate; Anorthosis Famagusta won on away goals.

19 September 2002
18:00

| Midtjylland (Denmark) | 1–0 | (Croatia) Varteks |
|---|---|---|
| Laursen 89' | Report |

Silkeborg Stadion, Silkeborg
Attendance: 1,595
Referee: Asim Khudiev (Azerbaijan)
3 October 2002
18:30

| Varteks (Croatia) | 1–1 | (Denmark) Midtjylland |
|---|---|---|
| Mumlek 86' | Report | Pimpong 67' |

Stadion Varteks, Varaždin
Attendance: 3,750
Referee: Steve Bennett (England)

Midtjylland won 2–1 on aggregate.

19 September 2002
21:00

| Blackburn Rovers (England) | 1–1 | (Bulgaria) CSKA Sofia |
|---|---|---|
| Grabbi 27' | Report | Dimitrov 23' |

Ewood Park, Blackburn
Attendance: 18,300
Referee: Bruno Coué (France)
3 October 2002
18:30

| CSKA Sofia (Bulgaria) | 3–3 | (England) Blackburn Rovers |
|---|---|---|
| Gargorov 66', 88' (pen.); Agnaldo 69' | Report | Thompson 30'; Østenstad 56'; Duff 58' |

Balgarska Armiya Stadium, Sofia
Attendance: 18,000
Referee: Alon Yefet (Israel)

4–4 on aggregate; Blackburn Rovers won on away goals.

19 September 2002
20:00

| Mouscron (Belgium) | 2–2 | (Czech Republic) Slavia Prague |
|---|---|---|
| Mpenza 72', 90' (pen.) | Report | Vachoušek 41'; Petrouš 48' |

Stade Le Canonnier, Mouscron
Attendance: 5,262
Referee: Dani Koren (Israel)
3 October 2002
20:00

| Slavia Prague (Czech Republic) | 5–1 | (Belgium) Mouscron |
|---|---|---|
| Došek 3', 40'; Gedeon 8'; Vachoušek 53'; Adauto 80' | Report | Müller 83' (o.g.) |

Stadion Evžena Rošického, Prague
Attendance: 5,267
Referee: Costas Kapitanis (Cyprus)

Slavia Prague won 7–3 on aggregate.
