= Trubila =

Trubila (Belarusian: Трубіла) is a Belarusian surname. Notable people with the surname include:

- Pavel Trubila (born 1991), Belarusian footballer
- Vitali Trubila (born 1985), Belarusian footballer
