= Martin Svoboda =

Martin Svoboda may refer to:

- Martin Svoboda (footballer)
- Martin Svoboda (rowing)
