= Hans Oeftger =

German footballer

Personal information
- Date of birth: 8 July 1999 (age 27)
- Place of birth: Germany
- Height: 1.80 m (5 ft 11 in)
- Position: Midfielder

Youth career
- Rot-Weiß Erfurt

Senior career*
Years	Team	Apps	(Gls)
2018	Rot-Weiß Erfurt	2	(0)
2018–2019	VfB Germania Halberstadt	6	(0)
2019	FC Einheit Rudolstadt	10	(0)
2019–2020	Vermont Catamounts		
2020–2021	Rot-Weiß Erfurt	5	(0)
2024	SV 09 Arnstadt	15	(0)
- * Club domestic league appearances and goals as of 12:44, 9 May 2026 (UTC)

Hans Oeftger (born 8 July 1999) is a German footballer who plays as a midfielder. He has played for Rot-Weiß Erfurt and abroad in the United States.
