= Lukáš Schut =

Czech footballer

Personal information
- Date of birth: 9 December 1985 (age 40)
- Place of birth: Most, Czechoslovakia
- Height: 1.78 m (5 ft 10 in)
- Position: Midfielder

Team information
- Current team: Einheit Rudolstadt
- Number: 16

Senior career*
Years	Team	Apps	(Gls)
2005–2012	Baník Most	121	(6)
2009	→ Čáslav (loan)	3	(1)
2011	→ Viktoria Žižkov (loan)	2	(0)
2012–2013	→ SSV Markranstädt	14	(1)
2013	→ Einheit Rudolstadt		
- * Club domestic league appearances and goals as of 26 November 2013

Lukáš Schut (born 9 December 1985) is a Czech football player who currently plays for Einheit Rudolstadt. He joined FK Viktoria Žižkov on loan in 2011 but only played two games before returning to Baník Most.
