= Letní stadion =

Letní stadion (Czech for Summer stadium) may refer to any of the following football stadiums in the Czech Republic:

- Letní stadion, Chomutov
- Letní stadion, Kopřivnice, multi purpose stadium in Kopřivnice
- CFIG Arena, formerly known as Letní stadion, in Pardubice
- Fotbalový stadion Josefa Masopusta, formerly known as Letní stadion, in Most
