= Niclas Fiedler =

German footballer

Personal information
- Date of birth: 7 March 1998 (age 28)
- Place of birth: Gera, Germany
- Height: 1.76 m (5 ft 9 in)
- Position: Left back

Team information
- Current team: Einheit Rudolstadt
- Number: 3

Youth career
- 2006–2009: Eurotrink Kickers
- 2009–2011: FV Bad Klosterlausnitz
- 2011–2015: Carl Zeiss Jena
- 2015–2017: Schalke 04

Senior career*
Years	Team	Apps	(Gls)
2017–2018	Schalke 04 II	0	(0)
2018	Carl Zeiss Jena II	15	(2)
2018–2019	Hallescher FC	8	(0)
2019–2021	Carl Zeiss Jena II	13	(1)
2019–2021	Carl Zeiss Jena	13	(1)
2021–	Einheit Rudolstadt	1	(0)
- * Club domestic league appearances and goals as of 5 February 2022

Niclas Fiedler (born 7 March 1998) is a German footballer who plays as a left back for Einheit Rudolstadt.
