= Petr Johana =

Czech footballer (born 1976)

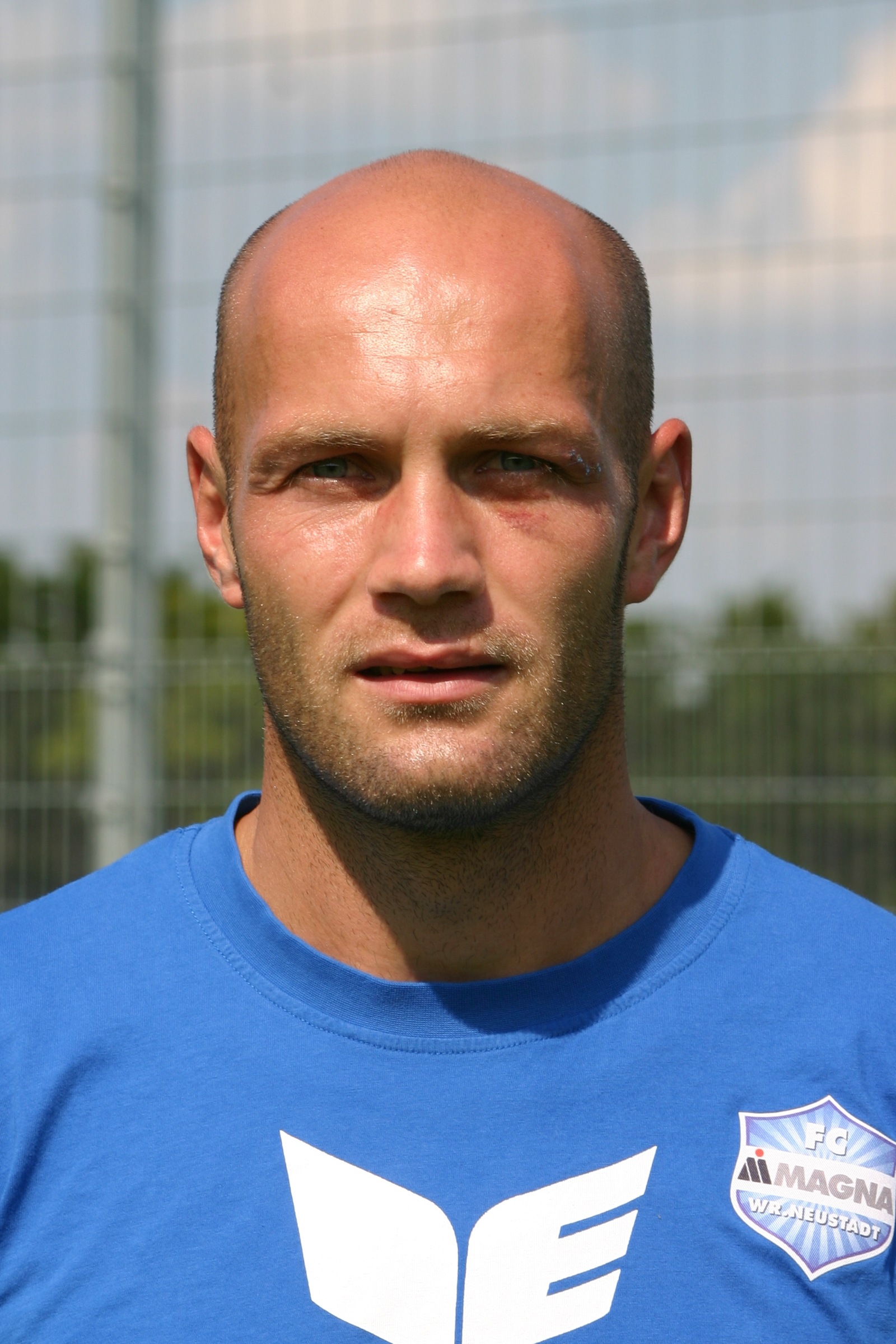

Personal information
- Date of birth: 1 November 1976 (age 49)
- Place of birth: Most, Czechoslovakia
- Height: 1.89 m (6 ft 2 in)
- Position: Defender

Youth career
- 1984–1990: SFK Meziboří
- 1990–1995: Chemopetrol Litvínov

Senior career*
Years	Team	Apps	(Gls)
1995	Ústí nad Labem		
1995–1996	Slavia Karlovy Vary		
1996–2000	MUS Most	65	(4)
2000–2003	Slovan Liberec	88	(9)
2003–2005	Sparta Prague	39	(2)
2005–2007	Vestel Manisaspor	35	(3)
2007–2008	SIAD Most	11	(0)
2008–2010	Magna Wiener Neustadt	50	(7)
2010–2014	Mladá Boleslav	67	(8)
2014	SIAD Most		

International career
2001–2003	Czech Republic	13	(0)
- * Club domestic league appearances and goals

Petr Johana (born 1 November 1976) is a former Czech professional footballer who lastly played for FK SIAD Most in the Czech National Football League.

== Career ==
Johana has played as a defender for Vestel Manisaspor in the Turkish Super League. Previous clubs he had played for during his career as a player before joining the Turkish League were FC MUS Most, FC Slovan Liberec and Sparta Prague.

He made his debut for the Czech Republic in a June 2001 World Cup qualification match against Denmark and has earned 13 caps, scoring one goal. His final international game was a November 2003 friendly match against Canada.

== Honours ==
- Czech League (2):
  - 2002, 2005
- Czech Cup (2):
  - 2000, 2004
