= Tomáš Kulvajt =

Czech footballer

Personal information
- Date of birth: 13 April 1979 (age 47)
- Place of birth: Czechoslovakia
- Height: 1.81 m (5 ft 11 in)
- Position: Forward

Senior career*
Years	Team	Apps	(Gls)
1997–2001	Bohemians	19	(0)
2001	Kolín		
2002–2004	Mladá Boleslav	63	(15)
2005–2006	Baník Most	25	(5)
2006–2007	Bohemians	26	(5)
2007–2010	Dukla Prague	67	(12)
- * Club domestic league appearances and goals

Tomáš Kulvajt (born 13 April 1979) is a Czech former football player. He played in the Gambrinus liga for Bohemians and Baník Most, as well as at lower levels for clubs including Mladá Boleslav and Dukla Prague. He was the top scorer for Dukla in the autumn part of the 2007–08 season, netting four league goals for the club.
