= Jaroslav Beláň =

Slovak footballer (born 1981)

Personal information
- Full name: Jaroslav Beláň
- Date of birth: 21 May 1981 (age 45)
- Place of birth: Bojnice, Czechoslovakia
- Height: 1.92 m (6 ft 3 1/2 in)
- Position: Goalkeeper

Youth career
- 1987–1990: ŠK VEGUM Dolné Vestenice
- 1990–1998: Baník Prievidza
- 1998–1999: ŠK VEGUM Dolné Vestenice

Senior career*
Years	Team	Apps	(Gls)
1999–2004	Baník Prievidza		
2003–2004	→ FK Reamos Kysucký (loan)		
2004–2007	FK SIAD Most	1	(0)
2006–2007	→ FK Chmel Blšany (loan)		
2007	→ Bohemians Prague (loan)	5	(0)
2008–2010	Bohemians Prague	49	(0)
2010–2011	→ České Budějovice (loan)	0	(0)
2011–2012	→ Ružomberok (loan)	0	(0)
2012–2014	Most	49	(0)
2014–2019	Baník Sokolov	104	(0)
- * Club domestic league appearances and goals as of 18:14, 8 September 2019 (UTC)

Jaroslav Beláň (born 21 May 1981) is a retired Slovak football goalkeeper. His last clubs were MFK Ružomberok, Bohemians Prague.
