= Michal Macek =

Czech footballer

Personal information
- Date of birth: 19 January 1981 (age 45)
- Place of birth: Příbram, Czechoslovakia
- Height: 1.74 m (5 ft 9 in)
- Position: Forward

Senior career*
| Years | Team | Apps | (Gls) |
| 1996–2003 | FK Příbram | | |
| 2002 | → FK Drnovice (loan) | 6 | (0) |
| 2003–2010 | Most | | |
| 2007 | → St Patrick's Athletic (loan) | 1 | (0) |
| 2008 | → Karviná (loan) | 15 | (3) |
| 2010–2011 | FK Příbram | 8 | (0) |
| 2011 | → Čáslav (loan) | | |
| 2011–2012 | Vlašim | 13 | (1) |
| 2012–2014 | FK Chmel Blšany | | |
| 2014–2017 | FCU Strengberg | | |
| 2017 | TJ Kovohute Podlesi | | |
| 2017–2019 | TJ Žitenice | | |
| 2019–2022 | SK Spartak Příbram | | |
| 2022–2023 | TJ Žitenice | | |
| 2023–2024 | TJ Sokol Nova Ves pod Plesi | | |

International career^{‡}
| 1997–1998 | Czech Republic U16 | 6 | (0) |
| 1998–1999 | Czech Republic U17 | 10 | (4) |
| 1999–2000 | Czech Republic U18 | 15 | (4) |
| 2001–2002 | Czech Republic U19 | 11 | (1) |
| 2001 | Czech Republic U21 | 1 | (2) |
- * Club domestic league appearances and goals as of 1 October 2026 ‡ National team caps and goals as of 25 December 2014

Michal Macek (born 19 January 1981) is a Czech former professional footballer.

Macek has represented his country at every level up to and including Under 21. At that level he scored in his only appearance. Also represented his country at the 2001 FIFA World Youth Championship.

He joined Irish club St Patrick's Athletic in July 2007 from Czech 1st Division club FK SIAD Most and has also had spells with FK Marila Příbram and FK Drnovice.
