= Tomáš Poláček =

Czech footballer

Personal information
- Date of birth: 29 August 1980 (age 46)
- Place of birth: Planá, Czechoslovakia
- Height: 1.73 m (5 ft 8 in)
- Position: Midfielder

Team information
- Current team: Zbuzany

Youth career
- 1986–1994: FK Tachov
- 1994–2000: Slavia Prague

Senior career*
Years	Team	Apps	(Gls)
1999–2000	Slavia Prague	2	(0)
2000–2005	SIAD Most	131	(?)
2006	Sparta Prague	17	(4)
2006–2010	Mladá Boleslav	91	(7)
2011	Sloboda Užice	10	(0)

International career
1997–1998	Czech Republic U17	9	(1)
1997–1999	Czech Republic U18	11	(0)
- * Club domestic league appearances and goals

Tomáš Poláček (born 29 August 1980) is a Czech semi-retired professional footballer who played as a midfielder. Since 2011, he has been playing only on amateur level.

== Club career ==
Born in Planá, he started playing for SK Slavia Prague at the age of 14. In 2000 FK Siad Most bought him from Slavia. In fall 2005 they were promoted to Czech First League. On 1 August 2005 after the 4th round unexpectedly Sparta Prague bought him. He played as starter all 6 group matches of the 2005–06 UEFA Champions League however Sparta ended up 4th and eliminated in the group. In July 2006 he joined FK Mladá Boleslav, where he played until 2010.

In February 2011, Poláček signed with Serbian club FK Sloboda Point Sevojno. He left Serbia in summer 2011 and returned to the Czech Republic where he joined FK Chmel Blšany. In 2014, after a spell at FC Chabry, he joined FC Přední Kopanina.

== International career ==
Tomáš Poláček has represented Czech Republic at U15–U18 levels.

== Honours ==
Sparta Prague

- Czech Cup: 2006
