= Philipp Röppnack =

German footballer

Personal information
- Full name: Philipp Röppnack
- Date of birth: 21 November 1989 (age 36)
- Place of birth: Jena, East Germany
- Height: 1.73 m (5 ft 8 in)
- Position: Defender

Team information
- Current team: SSV Markranstädt
- Number: 21

Youth career
- 1991–2008: FC Carl Zeiss Jena

Senior career*
Years	Team	Apps	(Gls)
2008–2012	FC Carl Zeiss Jena II	88	(3)
2010	→ FC Carl Zeiss Jena	1	(0)
2012–2013	VFC Plauen	3	(0)
2013–2019	Einheit Rudolstadt	153	(6)
2019–	SSV Markranstädt	3	(0)
- * Club domestic league appearances and goals as of 8 January 2021

Philipp Röppnack (born 21 November 1989 in Jena) is a German footballer playing for SSV Markranstädt.

== Career ==
Röppnack began his career with FC Carl Zeiss Jena youth team. In his first season in 2007–08 he played twenty-five games and scored two goals in the A-Jugend Bundesliga Nord/Nordost and was promoted in July 2008 to the reserve team. After 22 games was promoted to the first team of FC Carl Zeiss Jena in Mai 2009.
