= Arnaud Kouyo =

Ivorian footballer

Personal information
- Full name: Arnaud Ange Gballon Kouyo
- Date of birth: 4 August 1984 (age 42)
- Place of birth: Abidjan, Ivory Coast
- Height: 1.83 m (6 ft 0 in)
- Position: Defender

Senior career*
Years	Team	Apps	(Gls)
2003–06	Lecce	1	(0)
2004–05	→ Mons (loan)	15	(0)
2005–06	→ SIAD Most (loan)	15	(0)
2006–2007	Juve Stabia	8	(0)
2009	Tricase		
2009–	Francavilla		
- * Club domestic league appearances and goals

Arnaud Kouyo (born 4 August 1984 in Abidjan) is a former professional footballer who played as a defender and spent most of his career in Italy.

Kouyo made his debut in Serie A for Lecce.
