= Martin Boček =

Czech footballer

Personal information
- Date of birth: 14 December 1976 (age 49)
- Place of birth: Sokolov, Czechoslovakia
- Height: 1.97 m (6 ft 6 in)
- Position: Forward

Senior career*
Years	Team	Apps	(Gls)
2000–2004	Chmel Blšany		
2001–2002	→ Chomutov (loan)		
2004–2006	SIAD Most		
2006–2007	Baník Sokolov		
2007	Ústí nad Labem		
2008–2011	ZFC Meuselwitz		
2011–2015	VfB Auerbach		
2011	Chomutov		
2015–2016	FC Stahl Riesa		
2016–?	Chomutov		

Managerial career
- 2015–2016: FC Stahl Riesa (player-manager)
- * Club domestic league appearances and goals

Martin Boček (born 14 December 1976) is a Czech former professional footballer who played as a forward. (Note: Martin Boček at WorldFootball.net)
