= Aleš Pikl =

Czech footballer

Personal information
- Date of birth: 2 April 1975 (age 51)
- Place of birth: Roudnice nad Labem, Czechoslovakia
- Height: 1.84 m (6 ft 1/2 in)
- Position: Midfielder

Youth career
- 1982–1990: Čechie Mšené Lázně
- 1990–1992: SK Roudnice nad Labem
- 1992–1995: FK Chmel Blšany

Senior career*
Years	Team	Apps	(Gls)
1995	FK Chmel Blšany	14	(5)
1996–1997	FC Baník Ostrava	41	(4)
1998–1999	FK Teplice	34	(0)
1999–2004	FK Viktoria Žižkov	142	(33)
2005	Niki Volos	12	(0)
2005	FC Tescoma Zlín	9	(0)
2006–2007	FK Siad Most	33	(8)
2007–2008	SK Sparta Krč	3	(0)
2008–2009	Tatran Prešov		
2009–2011	ZFC Meuselwitz	4	(0)

International career
1995–1997	Czech Republic U-21	14	(1)
2002	Czech Republic	1	(0)
- * Club domestic league appearances and goals

Aleš Pikl (born 2 April 1975) is a Czech football player.

Pikl played for several Gambrinus liga clubs, including Baník Ostrava and FK Teplice. He is however associated mostly with FK Viktoria Žižkov, where he played over 100 league matches. In the 2002–03 season Pikl scored 11 goals, becoming the third best goalscorer of the season.

While playing for Chmel Blšany and Baník Ostrava, Pikl was a regular for the Czech Republic national U-21 football team. In 2002, he played his only match in the senior national team against Greece.
