= Ivo Zbožínek =

Czech footballer (born 1977)

Personal information
- Date of birth: 24 May 1977 (age 49)
- Place of birth: Prostějov, Czechoslovakia
- Height: 1.95 m (6 ft 5 in)
- Position: Defender

Youth career
- 1985–1988: Agrostroj Prostějov
- 1985–1995: Železárny Prostějov

Senior career*
Years	Team	Apps	(Gls)
1995–1998	LeRK Prostějov		
2000–2001	Chmel Blšany	34	(1)
2002	Vysočina Jihlava		
2002–2003	LeRK Prostějov		
2003	FK Drnovice		
2004–2005	1. FC Slovácko	4	(0)
2006	FK Drnovice	14	(1)
2006–2011	FC Tescoma Zlín	140	(16)
2011	FC Zbrojovka Brno	12	(1)
- * Club domestic league appearances and goals as of 1 October 2014

Ivo Zbožínek (born 24 May 1977) is a retired Czech football player.

Zbožínek started his football career in Prostějov. He first played in the Gambrinus liga at Chmel Blšany. He eventually appeared in several other clubs from South Moravia. In 2006, he was transferred to Tescoma Zlín, where he played until 2011.
