= Lukáš Pleško =

Czech footballer (born 1977)

Personal information
- Date of birth: 21 May 1977 (age 49)
- Place of birth: Plzeň, Czechoslovakia
- Height: 1.75 m (5 ft 9 in)
- Position: Defender

Team information
- Current team: 1. FK Příbram
- Number: 7

Youth career
- 1984–1993: ČSAD Plzeň
- 1993–1996: 1. FC Plzeň

Senior career*
Years	Team	Apps	(Gls)
1996–2001	Viktoria Plzeň	107	(6)
2002–2005	Chmel Blšany	110	(4)
2006–	1. FK Příbram	89	(3)

International career
1998–1999	Czech Republic U-21	5	(0)
- * Club domestic league appearances and goals as of 17 May 2010

Lukáš Pleško (born 21 May 1977) is a professional Czech football player.
