= Ondřej Lysoněk =

Czech footballer (born 1986)

Personal information
- Date of birth: 3 September 1986 (age 40)
- Place of birth: Czechoslovakia
- Height: 1.88 m (6 ft 2 in)
- Position: Defender

Senior career*
Years	Team	Apps	(Gls)
2005–2009	Slovácko	37	(0)
- Uherský Brod
- Břeclav
- Spytihněv

International career
2005	Czech Republic U19	1	(0)
2006	Czech Republic U21	2	(0)
- * Club domestic league appearances and goals

Ondřej Lysoněk (born 3 September 1986) is a retired Czech football player who played in the Czech First League for Slovácko. He subsequently played for clubs in lower leagues.
