= Vitali Trubila =

Belarusian former football player (born 1985)

Personal information
- Date of birth: 7 January 1985 (age 41)
- Place of birth: Brest, Byelorussian SSR, Soviet Union
- Height: 1.78 m (5 ft 10 in)
- Position: Midfielder

Youth career
- 2002–2004: Dinamo Minsk

Senior career*
Years	Team	Apps	(Gls)
2002	Dinamo-BNTU Minsk	10	(0)
2003–2004	Dinamo-Juni Minsk	14	(0)
2004–2005	Dinamo Minsk	6	(0)
2005	→ Darida Minsk Raion (loan)	20	(2)
2006–2009	Baník Most	33	(1)
2009	→ Tescoma Zlín (loan)	13	(0)
2009–2012	Slavia Prague	47	(3)
2010–2011	→ Bohemians 1905 (loan)	16	(1)
2012–2013	Dinamo Minsk	24	(1)
2014	Gomel	5	(0)
2015	Sokol Saratov	12	(0)
2015	Shakhtyor Soligorsk	8	(0)
2016–2017	Minsk	46	(1)
2018–2020	Slutsk	63	(2)

International career^{‡}
2005	Belarus U21	2	(0)
2011–2014	Belarus	16	(0)
- * Club domestic league appearances and goals as of 31 December 2020 ‡ National team caps and goals as of 19 November 2014

Vitali Trubila (Belarusian: Віталь Трубіла; born 7 January 1985) is a Belarusian former football player.

== Career ==
Born in Brest, Trubila began his career playing for the youth side of FC Dinamo Minsk. He played for Darida Minsk Raion during the 2005 season.

In January 2006, the midfielder moved to Czech First League side Baník Most. Most sent Trubila on a six-month loan with Tescoma Zlín in January 2009. When he returned from the loan, he was transferred to Slavia Prague.

On 3 June 2011, Trubila made his debut for the Belarus national football team, playing the full match against France.

== Family ==
His brother Pavel Trubila is also a professional footballer.

== Honours ==
Dinamo Minsk

- Belarusian Premier League champion: 2004
