= Jiří Novotný (footballer) =

Czech footballer

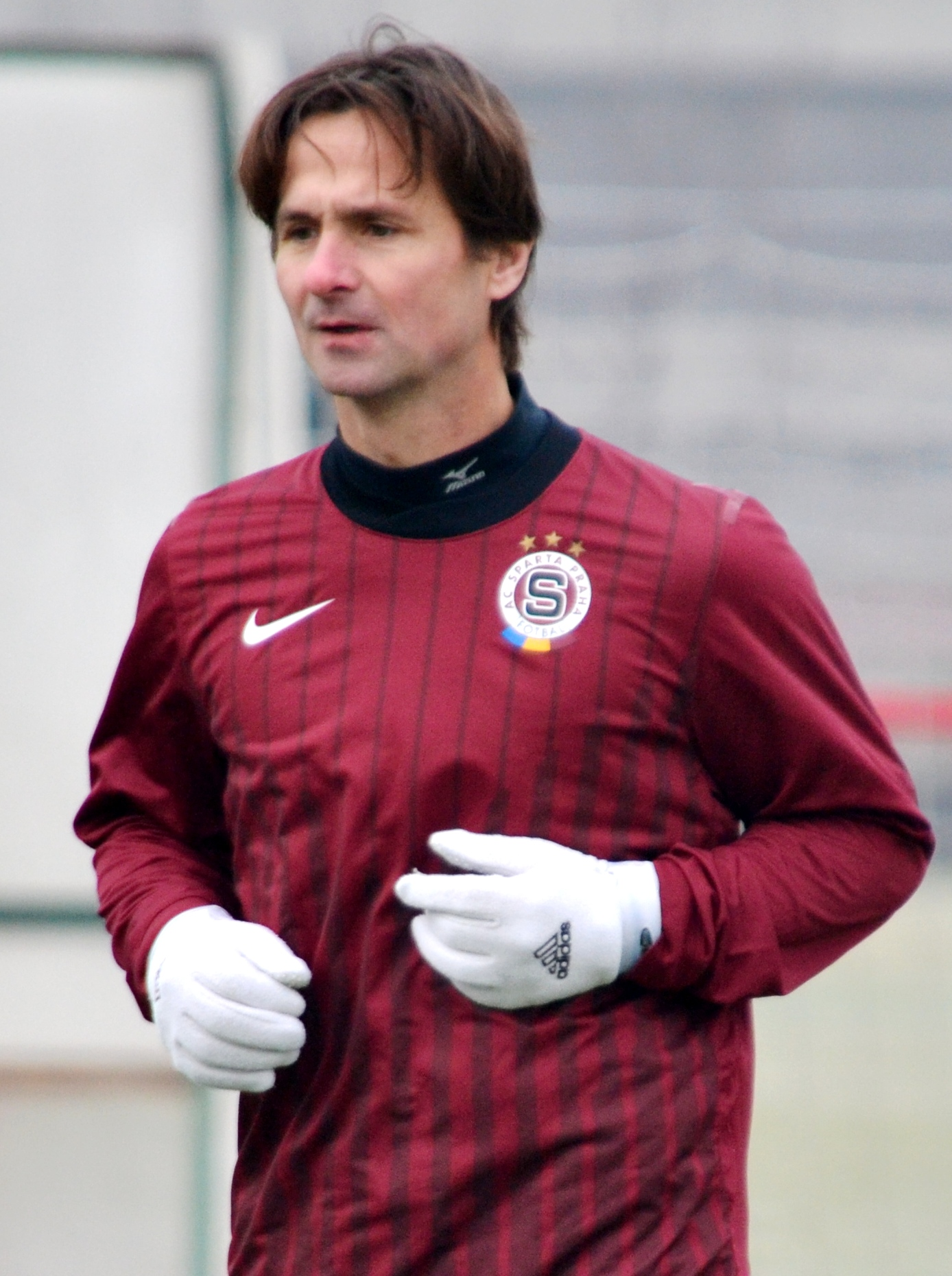
- Novotný in 2013

Personal information
- Date of birth: 7 April 1970 (age 56)
- Place of birth: Prague, Czechoslovakia
- Height: 1.81 m (5 ft 11 in)
- Position: Defensive midfielder

Youth career
- 1976–1984: Baník Stochov
- 1984–1988: Sparta Prague

Senior career*
Years	Team	Apps	(Gls)
1986–2002	Sparta Prague	363	(32)
1999	→ Slovan Liberec (loan)	9	(0)
2003–2004	Rubin Kazan	46	(7)
2005–2006	SIAD Most	44	(2)
2007	Chmel Blšany	15	(1)
2007–2008	Ružomberok	30	(2)
2008–2009	Dukla Prague	26	(0)
Total		533	(44)

International career
1991–1993	Czechoslovakia	12	(0)
1994–2002	Czech Republic	21	(2)

Managerial career
- 2024–2025: České Budějovice (assistant)
Medal record
TJ Sparta ČKD Prague
Winner	1st Czechoslovak Football League	1986–87
Winner	1st Czechoslovak Football League	1987–88
Winner	1st Czechoslovak Football League	1988–89
Winner	1st Czechoslovak Football League	1989–90
Winner	1st Czechoslovak Football League	1990–91
AC Sparta Prague
Winner	1st Czechoslovak Football League	1992–93
Winner	1st Czech Football League	1993–94
Winner	1st Czech Football League	1994–95
Winner	1st Czech Football League	1996–97
Winner	Gambrinus liga	1997–98
Winner	Gambrinus liga	1998–99
Winner	Gambrinus liga	1999–00
Winner	Gambrinus liga	2000–01
Winner	Gambrinus liga	2002–03
- * Club domestic league appearances and goals

Jiří Novotný (Czech pronunciation: [ˈjɪr̝iː ˈnovotniː]; born 7 April 1970 in Prague) is a former Czech professional football defender. He played for Czechoslovakia and the Czech Republic, playing a total of 33 matches and scored two goals for both teams.

== Biography ==
Novotný began playing football in Stochov and became part of Sparta Prague's youth team at the age of fourteen. He went on to spend most of his career with Sparta Prague, debuting in the 1986–87 season where the club was crowned league champions.

Aside from the Czech Republic, Novotný also played in Russian club Rubin Kazan in 2003 and 2004 as well as Slovak club MFK Ružomberok in 2007–08 season. Upon ending his playing career, he was appointed assistant coach to František Straka in České Budějovice on 2 September 2024.

Novotný is married and has a daughter. He spends his free time watching ice hockey.

== International goals ==
Scores and results list Czech Republic's goal tally first.

No	Date	Venue	Opponent	Score	Result	Competition
1.	22 February 1994	İnönü Stadium, Istanbul, Turkey	Turkey	1–1	4–1	Friendly
2.	11 October 1997	Letná Stadium, Prague, Czech Republic	Slovakia	3–0	3–0	1998 FIFA World Cup qualification
