= Václav Kalina =

Czech footballer

Personal information
- Date of birth: 15 July 1979 (age 47)
- Place of birth: Kladno, Czechoslovakia
- Height: 1.76 m (5 ft 9 in)
- Position: Left back

Team information
- Current team: SK Kladno
- Number: 8

Youth career
- SK Kladno

Senior career*
Years	Team	Apps	(Gls)
2002–2007	SK Kladno	105	(13)
2007–2012	FK Mladá Boleslav	107	(5)
2012–2015	Bohemians 1905	32	(1)
2015–	SK Kladno		
- * Club domestic league appearances and goals as of 1 May 2019

Václav Kalina (born 15 July 1979) is a Czech football player who played as a midfielder for Bohemians 1905 and FK Mladá Boleslav in the Czech First League. He currently plays for SK Kladno in lower Czech tiers.
