= Zdeněk Ščasný =

Czech footballer and manager (born 1957)

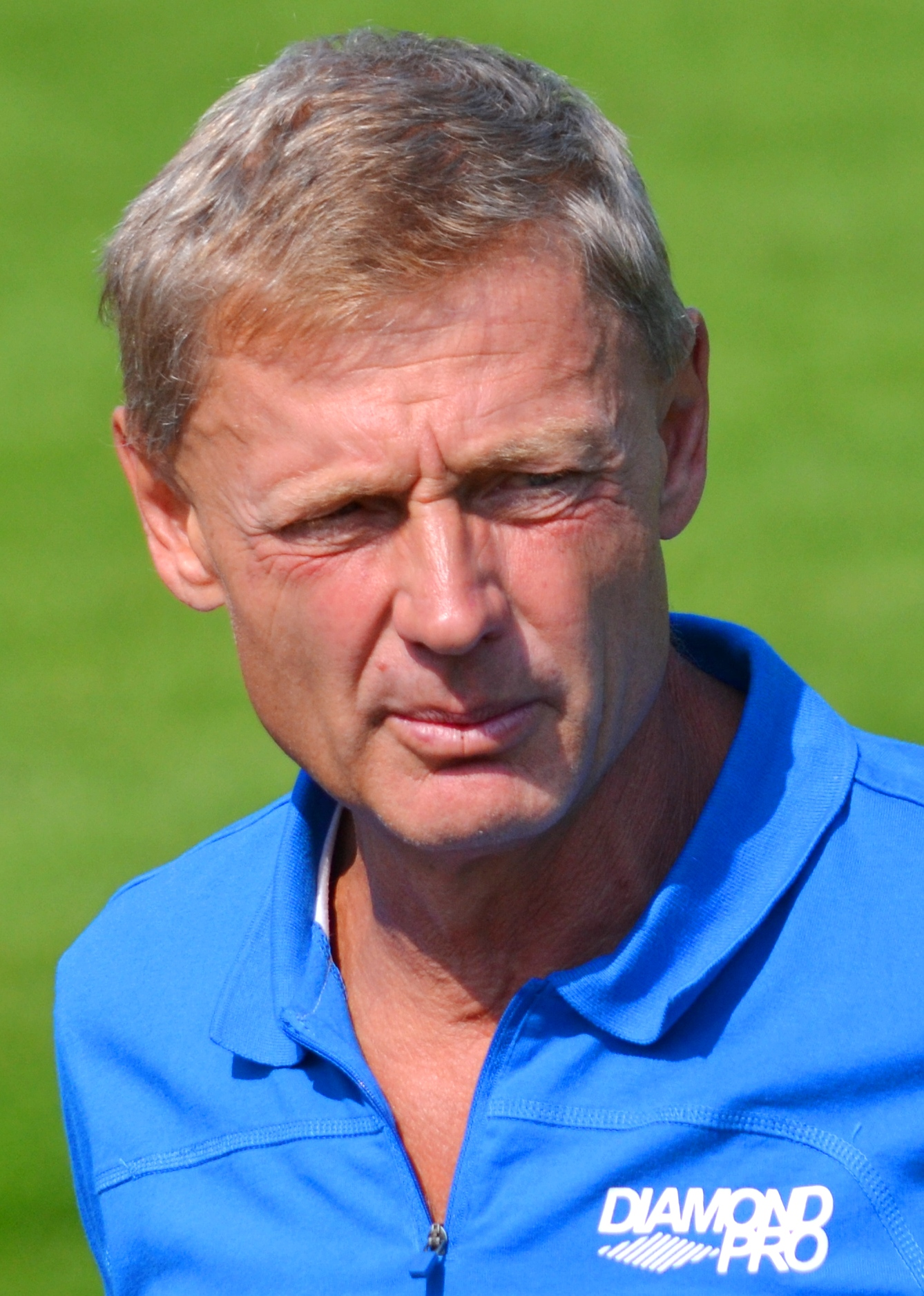

Personal information
- Full name: Zdeněk Ščasný
- Date of birth: 9 August 1957 (age 69)
- Place of birth: Brno, Czechoslovakia
- Positions: Defender; midfielder

Youth career
- 1969–1975: Spartak Roudnice nad Labem

Senior career*
Years	Team	Apps	(Gls)
1975–1978	Dukla Prague		
1978–1985	Sparta Prague		
1985–1989	Bohemians 1905	56	(0)
1989–1991	Agro Slušovice		
1991–1993	Anagennisi Dherynia		
1993–1995	SK Roudnice n.L.		

International career
1979	Czechoslovakia U21	5	(0)
1983–1984	Czechoslovakia	4	(0)

Managerial career
- 1992–1993: Anagennisi Dherynia (Youth)
- 1993–1995: SK Roudnice n.L. (Youth)
- 1995–1996: Chmel Blšany
- 1996: FK GGS Arma Ústí n.L.
- 1996–1997: Sparta Prague (Assistant)
- 1998–1999: Sparta Prague
- 1999–2002: FK Viktoria Žižkov
- 2002–2003: OFI
- 2004–2005: Panathinaikos
- 2005–2007: FK SIAD Most
- 2007–2008: Mladá Boleslav
- 2008–2009: FK Viktoria Žižkov
- 2011–2012: Debreceni VSC
- 2012–2015: FK Teplice
- 2015–2016: Sparta Prague
- 2018–2019: Sparta Prague
- * Club domestic league appearances and goals as of 2007-05-14

Zdeněk Ščasný (born 9 August 1957) is a Czech football manager and former player.

Ščasný has won the Czech league championship five times—three times as a player and twice as a coach—and the Czech Cup three times—twice as a player and once as a coach.

He is best known for his years with Sparta Prague—both as a player and a manager. He played as a defender and also in midfield. He has also coached Greek giants Panathinaikos.

== Playing career ==
=== Early career, Dukla Prague and first title ===
Zdenek Ščasný in his youth played for Spartak Roudnice nad Labem. At 17 years old he moved to Dukla Prague, where he made his Czechoslovak First League debut. Ščasný spent four years with Dukla Prague, and won the Czechoslovak First League in 1976–77.

=== Sparta Prague and more titles ===
In 1978 Ščasný moved to Sparta Prague, where he remained until 1985. With Sparta, Ščasný won the Czechoslovak Cup in 1979–80, a Czechoslovak League and Cup double in 1983–84, and the league again in 1984–85.

=== Late career ===
In 1985 Ščasný joined Bohemians, playing there for four and a half seasons. After Bohemians Ščasný played with Agro Slušovice for a short time and then moved to Cyprus to play for Anagennisi Dherynia before ending his playing career.

=== International career ===
During his career Ščasný earned four caps as a Czechoslovakia national team player, making his debut against Cyprus on 27 March 1983. He also made five appearances for the Czechoslovakia national under-21 football team in 1979.

== Managerial career ==
=== Early career ===
Ščasný began his coaching career by acting as a player-coach at Anagennisi Dherynia, and he later supervised the youth there.

Ščasný returned to his homeland in 1993, and, after working with some smaller clubs, he became an assistant coach at Sparta Prague in 1996.

=== Sparta Prague ===
In the middle of the 1997–98 season Ščasný took over as Sparta's head coach and led the team to the 1. Liga championship. The following season Ščasný and Sparta repeated as league champions.

=== FK Viktoria Žižkov ===
After his second league championship with Sparta, Ščasný took over Viktoria Žižkov in 1999–2000. Ščasný spent three seasons with Žižkov, guiding them to great improvement year after year, as the team finished 9th-place in 1999–2000, 5th-place in 2000–01, and 3rd-place—the club's highest-ever finish—in 2001–02. In 2000–01 Ščasný led Žižkov to win the Czech Cup in 2000–01—the club's first title since 1993–94.

=== Greece: OFI and Panathinaikos ===
After leaving Žižkov, Ščasný moved to Greece to be the head coach of OFI. Ščasný led OFI to an 8th-place finish in his first season with the club. Scasny had very poor relations with many of the players at OFI and by the time he left the club the situation between him and many of the players was terrible.

His work at OFI led Greek giants Panathinaikos to hire him early in the 2004–05 season to replace Itzhak Shum. Ščasný took over in the middle of Panathinaikos' UEFA Champions League campaign, and with two impressive draws against Arsenal, another draw in Norway against Rosenborg and a resounding win over PSV Eindhoven in Athens, Ščasný guided the Greek side to finish 3rd in a difficult group, thus moving them to the UEFA Cup. Before Panathinaikos began the UEFA Cup competition later that season though, Ščasný was replaced in favor of Alberto Malesani.

=== FK SIAD Most ===
In the middle of the 2005–06 season modest Czech side FK SIAD Most was in its first-ever season in the Czech top flight, and was in danger of being relegated right back to the second division. Most turned to Ščasný during the winter break, Ščasný helped Most stay in the top flight that season, boosting the team to a surprising 10th-place finish. In the 2006–07 Gambrinus liga Ščasný's Most finished 12th and again remained in the first division. However, Ščasný left Most at the end of the season by mutual consent.

=== Mladá Boleslav ===
After leaving Most, Ščasný took over at Mladá Boleslav early in the 2007–08 season. Boleslav was competing in the UEFA Cup that season, and in the first round of the competition Ščasný helped Boleslav pull off a stunning elimination of Italian club Palermo by winning 1–0 in the second leg of the tie in Italy. In the group stage of the competition, Boleslav finished 4th, behind Villarreal, Fiorentina and AEK Athens. Boleslav parted ways with Ščasný before the end of the season.

=== Return to FK Viktoria Žižkov ===
In the middle of the 2008–09 season Žižkov were bottom of the table and likely to be relegated. Žižkov turned to Ščasný for help for the final 16 matches of the season, but it was too late - Ščasný could not save the club and they were relegated to the second division.

=== Debreceni VSC ===
On 30 December 2010 Ščasný signed a two-year contract with Hungarian champions, Debreceni VSC. On 16 April 2011, he left the Hungarian club, after he failed to deliver sufficient wins.

=== Return to Czech football ===
In October 2012 Ščasný returned to Czech football after a three-year absence, taking over at FK Teplice.

== Personal life ==
Zdenek's son Michal and daughter Pavlína are both professional footballers.

== Managerial statistics ==
As of 28 December 2018

Team	From	To	Record							
Team	From	To	G	W	D	L	GF	GA	GD	Win %
Sparta Prague	8 January 1998	30 June 1999	54	33	11	10	103	39	+64	61.11
Viktoria Žižkov	27 September 1999	1 July 2002	96	49	23	24	151	105	+46	51.04
Panathinaikos	5 October 2004	5 February 2005	23	11	7	5	30	14	+16	47.83
Most	13 December 2005	1 June 2007	47	13	21	13	58	61	−3	27.66
Mladá Boleslav	4 September 2007	18 March 2008	25	9	6	10	35	30	+5	36.00
Viktoria Žižkov	4 November 2008	2 August 2009	18	3	6	9	14	23	−9	16.67
Debreceni VSC	30 December 2010	16 April 2011	14	4	4	6	17	22	−5	28.57
Teplice	2 October 2012	16 February 2015	76	30	19	27	123	94	+29	39.47
Sparta Prague	16 April 2015	26 September 2016	73	38	17	18	134	79	+55	52.05
Sparta Prague	27 July 2018	Present	21	10	6	5	34	18	+16	47.62
Career totals			447	200	120	127	699	485	+214	44.74

== Honours ==
=== As player ===
Dukla Prague

- Czechoslovak First League: 1976–77

Sparta Prague

- Czechoslovak First League: 1983–84, 1984–85
- Czechoslovak Cup: 1979–80, 1983–84

=== As manager ===
Sparta Prague

- 1. Liga: 1997–98, 1998–99, runner-up 2014-15, runner-up 2015–16

Viktoria Žižkov

- Czech Cup: 2000–01
- 1. Liga: 3rd place 2001–02
