= Martin Müller (footballer, born 1970) =

Czech footballer (born 1970)

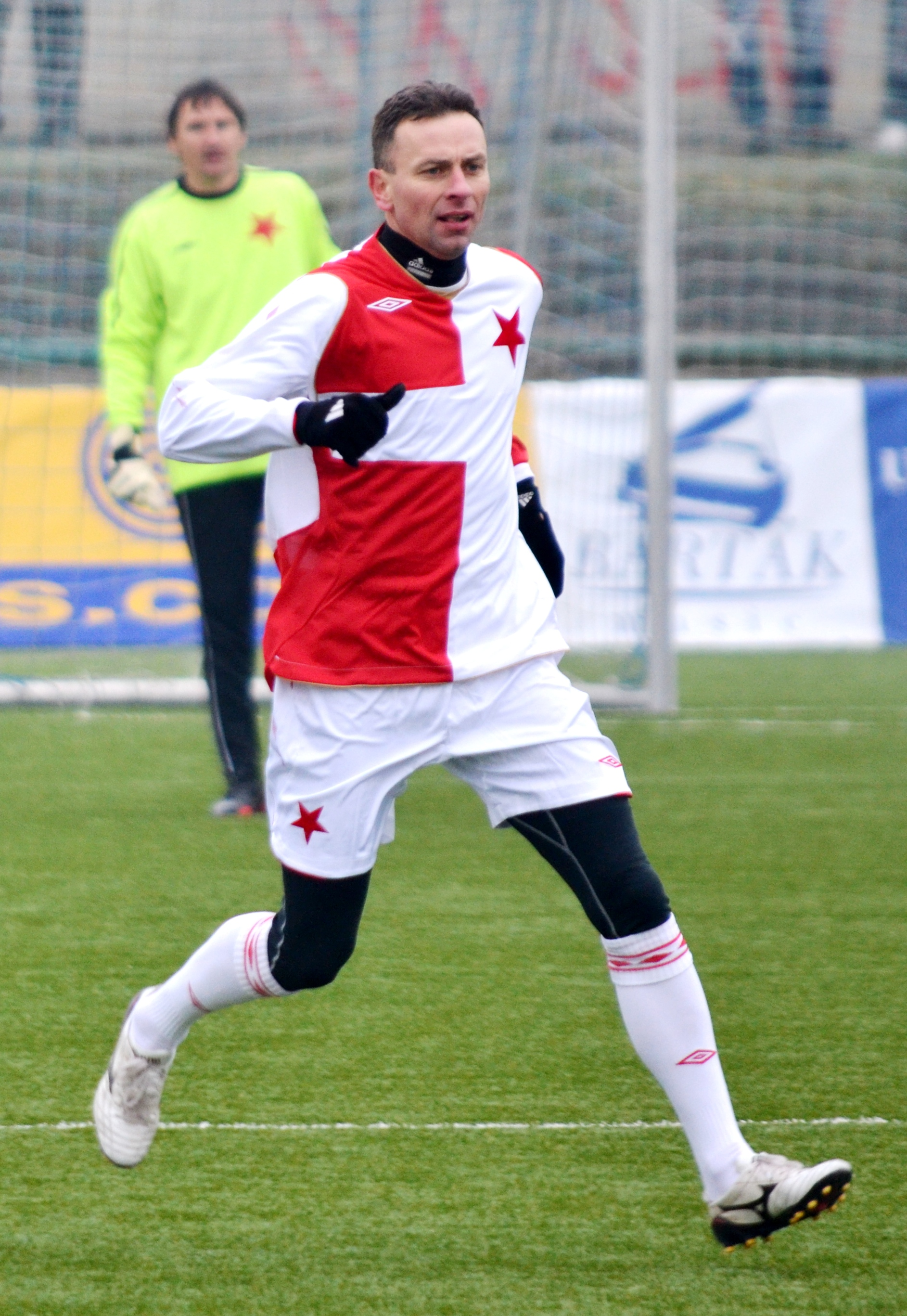

Personal information
- Full name: Martin Müller
- Date of birth: 6 November 1970 (age 55)
- Place of birth: Czechoslovakia
- Height: 1.82 m (6 ft 0 in)
- Position: Defender

Senior career*
Years	Team	Apps	(Gls)
1993–1996	RH Cheb	45	(2)
1996–2001	Petra Drnovice	106	(2)
2001–2004	SK Slavia Praha	81	(2)
2004–2006	Chmel Blšany	23	(1)
2005	→Vissel Kobe (loan)	12	(0)
2006	Chmel Blšany	13	(0)
2006–2008	FC Viktoria Plzeň	23	(1)
2008–2010	1. FK Příbram	32	(0)
Total		335	(8)
- * Club domestic league appearances and goals

Martin Müller (born 6 November 1970) is a Czech former professional football player.

== Club statistics ==
Club performance			League	
Season	Club	League	Apps	Goals
Czech Republic			League	
1993/94	Union Cheb	Gambrinus liga	1	0
1994/95	Union Cheb	Gambrinus liga	16	0
1995/96	Union Cheb	Gambrinus liga	28	2
1996/97	Petra Drnovice	Gambrinus liga	24	0
1997/98	Petra Drnovice	Gambrinus liga	24	1
1998/99	Petra Drnovice	Gambrinus liga	28	0
1999/00	Petra Drnovice	Gambrinus liga	18	1
2000/01	Drnovice	Gambrinus liga	12	0
2000/01	Slavia Prague	Gambrinus liga	14	0
2001/02	Slavia Prague	Gambrinus liga	19	1
2002/03	Slavia Prague	Gambrinus liga	24	0
2003/04	Slavia Prague	Gambrinus liga	24	1
2004/05	Chmel Blšany	Gambrinus liga	23	1
Japan			League	
2005	Vissel Kobe	J1 League	12	0
Czech Republic			League	
2005/06	Chmel Blšany	Gambrinus liga	13	0
Country	Czech Republic		268	7
Country	Japan		12	0
Total			280	7
