= Marcel Mácha =

Czech footballer (born 1969)

Personal information
- Date of birth: 26 May 1969 (age 57)
- Place of birth: Czechoslovakia
- Height: 1.71 m (5 ft 7 in)
- Position: Defender

Senior career*
Years	Team	Apps	(Gls)
1995–1996	FC Slovan Liberec	1	(0)
1997–2009	FC Dukla Příbram	234	(2)
- * Club domestic league appearances and goals

Marcel Mácha (born 26 May 1969) is a retired Czech football defender. He made over 200 appearances in the Czech First League, featuring mainly for FC Dukla Příbram. During his final season, Mácha was recognised as the oldest player in the Czech First League, although he only managed to play one minute of the season.
