= Pavel Trubila =

Belarusian footballer

Personal information
- Date of birth: 5 June 1991 (age 35)
- Height: 1.72 m (5 ft 7 1/2 in)
- Position: Defender

Youth career
- 2007–2010: Gomel

Senior career*
Years	Team	Apps	(Gls)
2010	Gomel-2	14	(3)
2010–2011	Vedrich-97 Rechitsa	38	(3)
2012–2013	Dnepr Mogilev	6	(0)
2014–2015	Rechitsa-2014	47	(3)
2016	Gomelzheldortrans	17	(0)
2017–2018	Sputnik Rechitsa	35	(1)
- * Club domestic league appearances and goals as of 17 December 2018

Pavel Trubila (Belarusian: Павел Трубіла; Russian: Павел Валерьевич Трубило; born 5 June 1991) is a Belarusian former professional footballer.

His brother Vitali Trubila is also a professional footballer and former Belarus international player.
