= Oldřich Pařízek =

Czech footballer

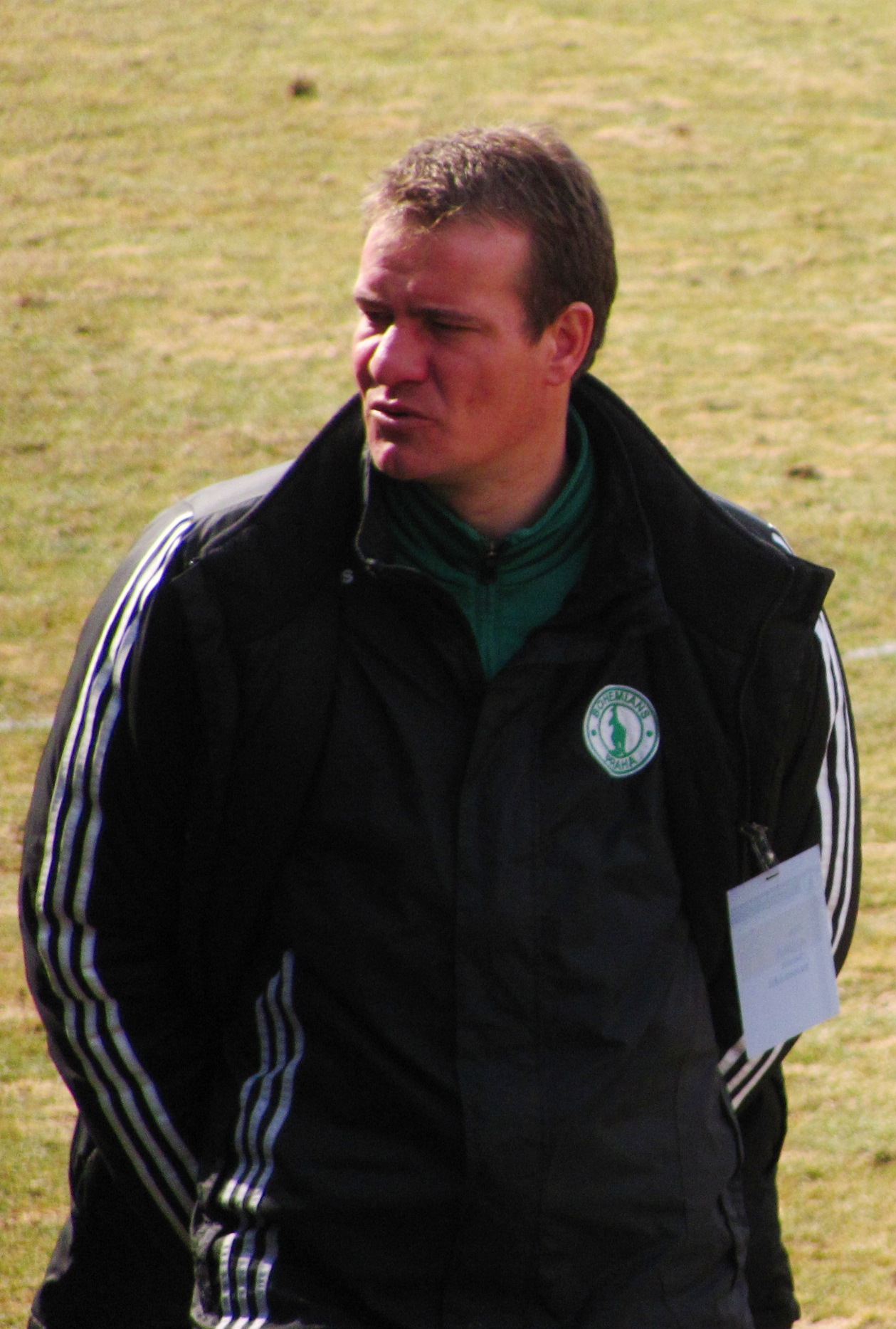
- Oldřich Pařízek (2012)

Personal information
- Date of birth: 24 March 1972 (age 54)
- Place of birth: Mladá Boleslav, Czechoslovakia
- Height: 1.91 m (6 ft 3 in)
- Position: Goalkeeper

Youth career
- Mladá Boleslav

Senior career*
| Years | Team | Apps | (Gls) |
| 1991–1992 | Slaný | | |
| 1992–1993 | Jablonec | | |
| 1993–1998 | Viktoria Žižkov | 59 | (0) |
| 1998–2002 | Royal Antwerp | 84 | (0) |
| 2002 | Marila Příbram | | |
| 2003 | FK Admira/Slavoj | | |
| 2003 | Semily | | |
| 2004–2007 | Marila Příbram | 73 | (0) |
| 2007–2008 | Viktoria Žižkov | 3 | (0) |
- * Club domestic league appearances and goals

Oldřich Pařízek (born 24 March 1972) is a retired football goalkeeper who played for clubs in Czechoslovakia and Belgium.

== Career ==
Pařízek spent most of his career playing in Czechoslovakia, but he played for Belgian Pro League side Royal Antwerp FC from 1998 to 2002. He finished his playing career with Gambrinus liga side FK Viktoria Žižkov.
