= Martin Zbončák =

Czech footballer and coach (born 1975)

Personal information
- Date of birth: 21 July 1975 (age 51)
- Place of birth: Třinec, Czechoslovakia
- Height: 1.80 m (5 ft 11 in)
- Position: Defender

Youth career
- FK Fotbal Třinec

Senior career*
| Years | Team | Apps | (Gls) |
| 1991–1995 | VTJ Znojmo | | |
| 1995–2001 | 1. FC Brno | 122 | (4) |
| 2001–2003 | FC Slovan Liberec | 29 | (5) |
| 2003 | Sparta Prague | 21 | (1) |
| 2004 | FC Dynamo Moscow | 14 | (2) |
| 2005 | Slavia Prague | 31 | (4) |
| 2006–2007 | FK Baník Most | 39 | (1) |
| 2007 | Iraklis | 11 | (0) |
| 2008 | FC Hradec Králové | 11 | (0) |
| 2008 | Bohemians (Střížkov) Prague | 6 | (0) |
| 2009 | FK Fotbal Trinec | 30 | (1) |
| 2009 | FK Slavoj Vyšehrad | | |

International career
| 1996 | Czech Republic U21 | 1 | (0) |

Managerial career
- 2016: FK Třinec (assistant)
- 2016–2021: FK Třinec (youth)
- 2021–2023: FK Třinec
- * Club domestic league appearances and goals

Martin Zbončák (born 21 July 1975) is a Czech football coach and a former player.

== Club career ==
Zbončák previously had spells in the Russian Premier League with FC Dynamo Moscow and in the Super League Greece with Iraklis
