= Martin Svoboda (footballer) =

Czech footballer

Personal information
- Date of birth: 2 January 1975 (age 51)
- Place of birth: Czechoslovakia
- Height: 1.96 m (6 ft 5 in)
- Position: Goalkeeper

Youth career
- Slavia Prague

Senior career*
Years	Team	Apps	(Gls)
2000–2003	Hradec Králové	26	(0)
2004	→ Xaverov (loan)		
2004–2008	Most	73	(0)
2007	→ Blšany (loan)	13	(0)
2008–2010	Dukla Prague	40	(0)
2010–2011	Vysočina Jihlava	3	(0)
2011–	Litvínov		
- * Club domestic league appearances and goals as of 31 December 2011

Martin Svoboda (born 2 January 1975) is a Czech football goalkeeper who currently plays for FK Litvínov.

In July 2008, Svoboda transferred from Most to Czech 2. Liga side FK Dukla Prague.
