= Tomáš Randa =

Czech footballer (born 1974)

Personal information
- Date of birth: 23 December 1974 (age 51)
- Place of birth: Czechoslovakia
- Height: 1.75 m (5 ft 9 in)
- Position: Defender

Youth career
- 1982–1992: FC Veselí nad Moravou

Senior career*
Years	Team	Apps	(Gls)
1992–1993	TJ Zarazice		
1995–1997	FC Veselí nad Moravou		
1998–2000	LeRK Prostějov		
2001–2002	FK Drnovice	38	(1)
2002	Marila Příbram	12	(0)
2003–2008	Sigma Olomouc	139	(7)
2008–2010	1. FC Slovácko	36	(0)
- * Club domestic league appearances and goals as of 18 May 2010

Tomáš Randa (born 23 December 1974) is a Czech former football player.

Randa played for several Gambrinus liga clubs during his career, including SK Sigma Olomouc and FK Drnovice.
