= Petr Cigánek =

Czech footballer (born 1986)

Personal information
- Date of birth: 3 September 1986 (age 40)
- Place of birth: Frýdek-Místek, Czechoslovakia
- Height: 1.81 m (5 ft 11 1/2 in)
- Position: Defender

Youth career
- 1992–1998: SK Brušperk
- 1998–2004: FC Baník Ostrava

Senior career*
Years	Team	Apps	(Gls)
2004–2008	FC Baník Ostrava	37	(1)
2006	SFC Opava (loan)		
2008–2012	SFC Opava		
2012	Neusiedl		

International career
2003	Czech Republic U17	5	(0)
2003	Czech Republic U18	7	(2)
2004–2005	Czech Republic U19	15	(2)
2007	Czech Republic U21	3	(0)
- * Club domestic league appearances and goals as of 8 May 2010

Petr Cigánek (born 3 September 1986) is a Czech former football player.

Cigánek played Gambrinus liga for Baník Ostrava, where he played since the youth teams. He won the Czech Cup with Baník in 2005.
