= Martin Švejnoha =

Czech footballer (born 1977)

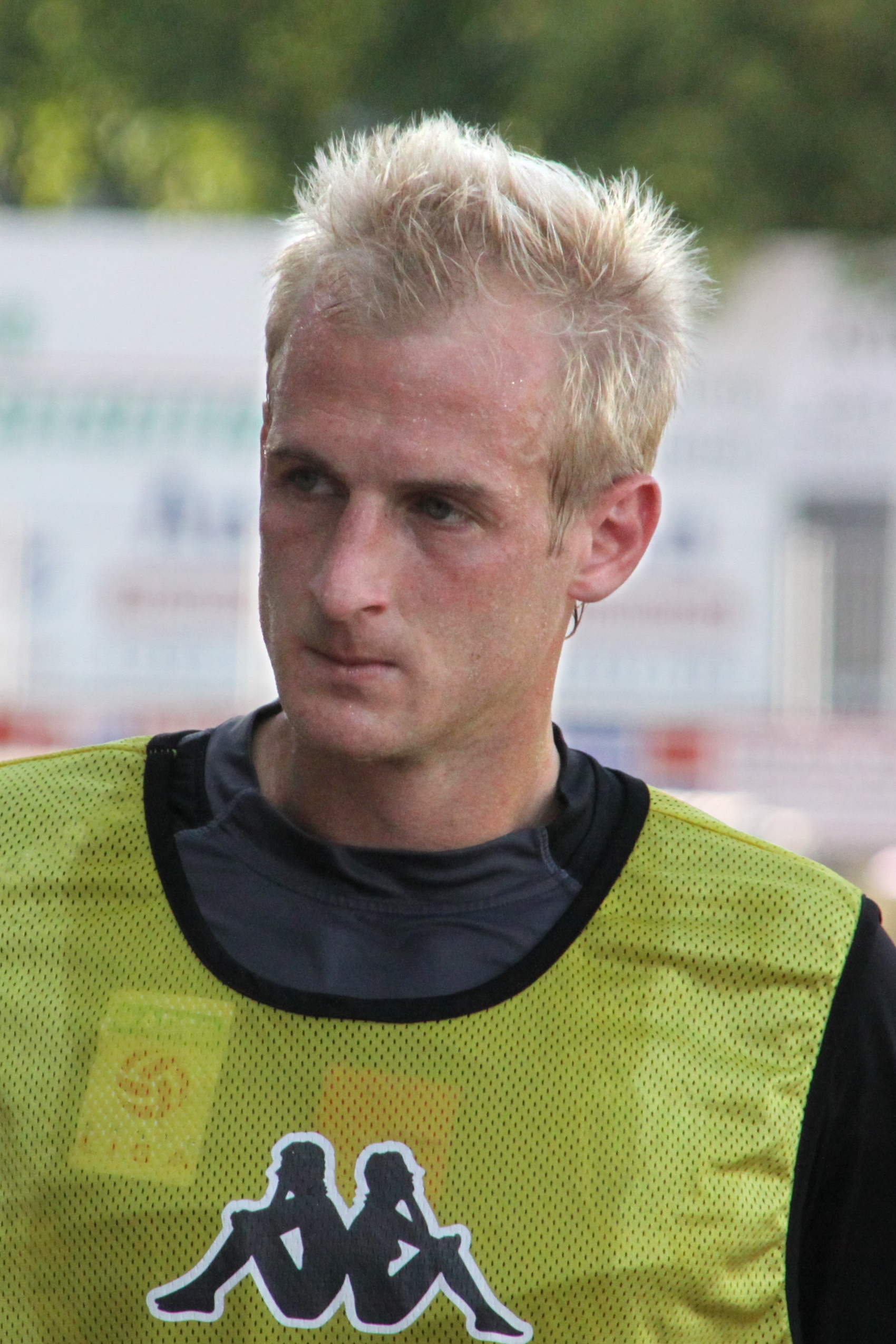

Personal information
- Date of birth: 25 November 1977 (age 48)
- Place of birth: Příbram, Czechoslovakia
- Height: 1.82 m (6 ft 0 in)
- Position: Defender

Youth career
- 1983–1988: TJ Březnice
- 1988–1991: UD Příbram
- 1991–1996: Viktoria Plzeň

Senior career*
Years	Team	Apps	(Gls)
1997–2004	Viktoria Plzeň	83	(1)
1999	→ FC Senec (loan)	?	(?)
2004–2006	FC Slovácko	48	(1)
2006–2009	1. FC Brno	59	(2)
2009–2013	Wacker Innsbruck	108	(1)
2013–2017	WSG Wattens	87	(6)

International career
1997	Czech Republic U-20	2	(0)
1997–1998	Czech Republic U-21	3	(0)
- * Club domestic league appearances and goals

Martin Švejnoha (born 25 November 1977) is a former Czech football player.
