= Fotbalový stadion Josefa Masopusta =

Multi-use stadium in Most, Czech Republic

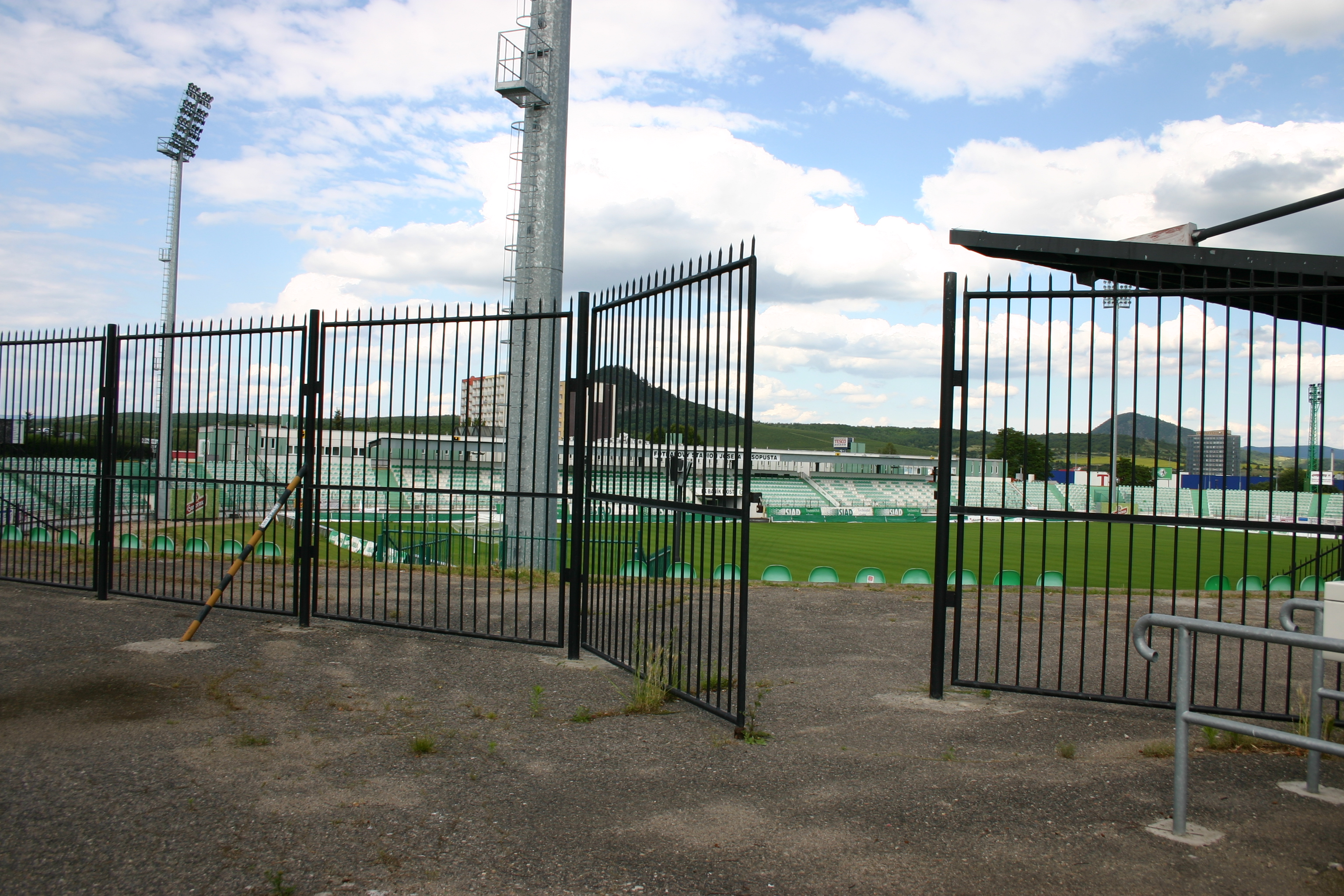
- Fotbalový stadion
- Interactive map of Fotbalový stadion Josefa Masopusta
- Location: Svatopluka Čecha 275, Most, Czech Republic, 434 01
- Coordinates: 50°30′38.31″N 13°38′48.78″E
- Operator: FK Baník Most-Souš
- Capacity: 7,500
- Field size: 105m x 68m

Construction
- Opened: 1961
- Renovated: 2004–2005, 2006

Tenant
- FK Baník Most-Souš

Fotbalový stadion Josefa Masopusta is a multi-use stadium in Most, Czech Republic. It is currently used mostly for football matches. It was the home ground of FK Baník Most 1909 and after it was disbanded, it is the home ground of FK Baník Most-Souš. The stadium has an all-seated capacity of 7,500 people.
