= FC Einheit Rudolstadt =

German football club

Einheit Rudolstadt
- Full name: Fußballclub Einheit Rudolstadt
- Founded: 1950
- Ground: Städtisches Stadion im Heinepark
- Capacity: 4,000
- Manager: Holger Jähnisch
- League: NOFV-Oberliga Süd (V)
- 2025–26: NOFV-Oberliga Süd, 12th of 16
- Website: http://www.einheit-rudolstadt.de/
Home colours	Away colours

FC Einheit Rudolstadt is a German football club from Rudolstadt in the district of Saalfeld-Rudolstadt, Thuringia. The ground of the club is called Städtisches Stadion im Heinepark. They play in the NOFV-Oberliga Süd.

== Club history ==
FC Einheit Rudolstadt was founded on 11 November 1950 as BSG Einheit Rudolstadt. In 1957, Rudolstadt, together with Stahl Silbitz and Chemie Elsterberg, succeeded in promotion to the II. DDR-Liga. The then-third-highest division of the GDR proved to be too strong for the East Thuringians, so after only one season Einheit and Motor Gotha were relegated back to the Bezirksliga.

In the Bezirksliga, Einheit acted solely at the local level in the Gera district and was used for the training of young players of FC Carl Zeiss Jena. Between rises and drops from and to the Bezirksklasse in the next decades, Einheit regained its resurgence in the Bezirksliga Gera. Its progress was stalled by city rivals Chemie Schwarza who repeatedly managed to rise to the DDR-Liga.

After German reunification in 1990, Einheit merged with the football section of Chemie Schwarza and was renamed FC Rudolstadt/Schwarza. In 1996, the two clubs de-merged. With Rudolstadt regaining the old name Einheit Rudolstadt and Schwarza rejoining SV Schwarza. In 2012, Einheit finished 3rd in the Thüringenliga but was promoted to the NOFV-Oberliga Süd as 2nd placed Eintracht Sondershausen waived its promotion right.

== First team squad 2014/15 ==
No	Nation	Name	Date of birth
GK
1	Germany	Tim Ackermann	23.11.1988
23	Germany	Patrick Richter	09.08.1992
DF
4	Germany	Christoph Grabinski	12.03.1990
6	Germany	René Kirsten	29.08.1985
10	Germany	Philipp Röppnack	21.11.1989
19	Germany	Marian Spanier	01.01.1988
21	Poland	Robert Stachowiak	28.02.1990
22	Germany	Georg Westrup	21.08.1992
24	Germany	Tino Langhammer	16.06.1989
25	Germany	Gary Häußler	06.05.1991
–	Germany	Sven Kutzner	07.07.1986
–	Germany	Robert Teske	26.06.1988
MF
3	Germany	Sebastian Schröter	13.10.1987
5	Ukraine	Mykhaylo Kopolovets	29.01.1984
7	Germany	Rico Heuschkel	20.03.1987
8	Germany	Rene Rudolph	07.01.1986
13	Germany	Stefan Staskewitsch	26.10.1986
16	Germany	Christian Schultz	16.01.1996
17	Poland	Maciej Zielinski	15.09.1990
20	Germany	Marcel Schulz	11.07.1988
21	Poland	Bartosz Latuszek	15.09.1990
FW
9	Germany	Steven Sonnenberg	22.10.1983
11	Germany	Benjamin Schröter	01.05.1989
15	Germany	Maik Müller	23.10.1994
18	Germany	Patrick Schröter	21.11.1990

== Coaching staff ==
Head coach: Holger Jähnisch
Assistants: Thomas Rothe, Michael Schoke, René Just, Jörg Schneider
