= FK Baník Most 1909 =

Baník Most
- Full name: Fotbalový klub Baník Most 1909
- Founded: 1909
- Dissolved: 2016 (youth section was merged with Mostecký FK)
- Ground: Fotbalový stadion Josefa Masopusta, Most, Czech Republic
- Capacity: 7,500
- Chairman: Milan Fric
- Manager: Stanislav Hofmann
- League: Bohemian Football League
- 2014–15: Czech 2. Liga, 15th (relegated)
- Website: fkbms.cz
Home colours	Away colours

FK Baník Most 1909 was a Czech football club based in the city of Most, approximately 75 kilometres north-west of Prague. The club played top-flight football for the first time in its history in the 2005–06 Czech First League.

The club's home stadium is Fotbalový stadion Josefa Masopusta, opened on 24 May 1961. Its inaugural fixture was a 4–1 defeat to Liverpool F.C.

In 2011, Baník Most signed an agreement whereby Arsenal Česká Lípa would function as their farm team.

== History ==
=== Historical names ===
- 1909 — SK Most (full name: Sportovní klub Most)
- 1948 — ZSJ Uhlomost Most (full name: Základní sportovní jednota Uhlomost Most)
- 1953 — DSO Baník Most (full name: Dobrovolná sportovní organizace Baník Most)
- 1961 — TJ Baník Most (full name: Tělovýchovná jednota Baník Most)
- 1979 — TJ Baník SHD Most (full name: Tělovýchovná jednota Baník Severočeské hnědouhelné doly Most)
- 1993 — FK Baník SHD Most (full name: Fotbalový klub Baník Severočeské hnědouhelné doly Most)
- 1995 — FC MUS Most 1996 (full name: Football Club Mostecká uhelná společnost Most 1996, a.s.)
- 2003 — FK SIAD Most (full name: Fotbalový klub SIAD Most, a.s.)
- 2008 — FK Baník Most
- 2013 — FK Baník Most 1909

=== Early history and Lower League Football ===
The club was founded on 19 May 1909, and there were very basic beginnings. Football activity in Most would be interrupted for significant periods of time during World War I and World War II, but even long thereafter, the quality of football in Most remained modest, as Most would play in the lower Czechoslovak leagues from the 1950s all the way through to the 1980s.

In the 1990s though, Most earned two promotions – first to the Bohemian Football League, the third-highest league in the country, then, in the 1996/97 season, to the Czech 2. Liga.

=== SIAD ownership and First Division Football ===
In spring 2003, Italian industrial-gas company SIAD acquired the club. Their investment marked the start of a gradually more successful era. The club took the name "FK SIAD Most" from the 2003/04 season.

By winning the 2. liga championship in the 2004/05 season, Most finally gained promotion to the Czech First League, for the 2005/06 season. Extensive reconstruction of the club's stadium – which included the installation of a new pitch, 7,500 seats, and floodlights – was completed in time for the club's first match in the top flight. After a slow start, manager Přemysl Bičovský was dismissed, making way for the arrival of Zdeněk Ščasný. Ščasný – a highly regarded manager, who had previously been in charge of Czech clubs AC Sparta Prague and FK Viktoria Žižkov and Greek clubs OFI and Panathinaikos – helped the club hold its position in the Czech First League, guiding the team to a respectable 10th place in the table.

For the 2006/07 season, the club had high expectations, with the ultimate goal being to finish in the top half of the table, but inconsistency would plague the team throughout the season. The team seemed capable of competing with the league's top sides, especially at home – Most managed to draw with AC Sparta Prague (eventual league champions), defeat Slavia Prague (eventual runners-up) and was overall unbeaten at home against the clubs who would finish in the top 5 league positions – but the team was less efficient when playing away from home, and an even bigger problem was an inability to consistently take full advantage of the relatively weaker sides of the league. This translated into Most finishing the season with a league-high 16 draws, good enough only for a somewhat disappointing 12th place in the league, but the club's top-flight status was secured once again.

At the end of the season the club and manager Zdeněk Ščasný mutually decided to end their relationship, and the club hired Robert Žák, who had previously been in charge of the club's youth set-up.

== Honours ==
- Czech 2. Liga
  - Winners (1): 2004–05
- Czech Cup
  - Semifinals: 2001–02

== Managers and players ==
=== Head coaches in club's history ===
Head coaches in club's history

- 2004 (Czech Republic) Přemysl Bičovský
- 2005 (Czech Republic) Zdeněk Ščasný
- 2007 (Czech Republic) Robert Žák
- 2009 (Czech Republic) Martin Pulpit
- 2010 (Uruguay) Jorge Aňon
- 2011 (Czech Republic) Michal Zach
- 2013 (Czech Republic) Zbyněk Busta
- 2013 (Czech Republic) Pavel Chaloupka
- 2014 (Czech Republic) Vít Raszyk
- 2014 (Germany) Wolfgang Jerat
- 2015 (Czech Republic) Pavel Medynský
- 2015 (Czech Republic) Robert Vágner
- 2016 (Czech Republic) Stanislav Hofmann

=== Notable former players ===
- (Czech Republic) Patrik Gedeon
- (Czech Republic) Stanislav Hofmann
- (Czech Republic) Petr Johana
- (Czech Republic) Josef Masopust
- (Czech Republic) Jiří Novotný
- (Czech Republic) Horst Siegl
- (Czech Republic) Jiří Štajner
- (North Macedonia) Goce Toleski
- (Czech Republic) Martin Vaniak

== History in domestic competitions ==
- 1991–1997: Bohemian Football League
- 1997–2005: Czech 2. Liga
- 2005–2008: Czech First League
- 2008–2015: Czech 2. Liga
- 2015–2016: Bohemian Football League

- Seasons spent at Level 1 of the football league system: 3
- Seasons spent at Level 2 of the football league system: 15
- Seasons spent at Level 3 of the football league system: 7
- Seasons spent at Level 4 of the football league system: 1

=== Czech Republic ===
Season	League	Placed	Pld	W	D	L	GF	GA	GD	Pts	Cup
1993–1994	3. liga	5th	34	14	9	11	52	45	+7	37 (Note: Two points for a win in 1993–94.)	First Round
1994–1995	3. liga	6th	34	15	9	10	56	40	+16	54	Round of 64
1995–1996	3. liga	6th	34	15	9	10	53	42	+11	54	First Round
1996–1997	3. liga	2nd	30	6	11	13	17	33	-16	29	Round of 64
1997–1998	2. liga	6th	28	12	7	9	36	30	+6	43	Quarterfinals
1998–1999	2. liga	4th	30	16	8	6	47	31	+16	56	Round of 16
1999–2000	2. liga	4th	30	10	15	5	43	32	+11	45	Round of 32
2000–2001	2. liga	8th	30	9	11	10	27	27	0	38	Round of 32
2001–2002	2. liga	9th	30	9	9	12	36	37	-1	36	Semifinals
2002–2003	2. liga	10th	30	9	11	10	28	30	-2	38	Round of 32
2003–2004	2. liga	9th	30	11	5	14	33	34	-1	38	Second Round
2004–2005	2. liga	1st	28	17	10	1	58	30	+28	61	Quarterfinals
2005–2006	1. liga	10th	30	10	6	14	34	41	-7	36	Second Round
2006–2007	1. liga	12th	30	5	16	9	31	41	-10	31	Round of 16
2007–2008	1. liga	16th	30	4	8	18	31	58	-27	20	Round of 32
2008–2009	2. liga	12th	30	10	7	13	30	43	-13	37	Second Round
2009–2010	2. liga	11th	30	8	12	10	35	38	-3	36	Second Round
2010–2011	2. liga	12th	30	10	7	13	35	46	-11	37	Second Round
2011–2012	2. liga	9th	30	11	5	14	31	44	-13	38	First Round
2012–2013	2. liga	14th	30	8	7	15	33	48	-15	31	Second Round
2013–2014	2. liga	12th	30	10	7	13	34	46	-12	37	First Round
2014–2015	2. liga	15th	30	5	6	19	25	51	-26	21	First Round
2015–2016	3. liga	18th	36	5	7	24	28	81	-53	18 (Note: No points for draws; After 90 minutes games were decided on penalties; two points for winning the penalty shootout and one for losing. Most won 2 and lost 5 such matches.) (Note: 6 points deducted due to outstanding debts.)	Second Round
