= 2012–13 Czech 2. Liga =

2. česká fotbalová liga
- Season: 2012–13
- Matches: 240
- Goals: 623 (2.6 per match)
- Top goalscorer: Lukáš Železník (13 goals)
- Biggest home win: Karviná 7–1 HFK Olomouc
- Biggest away win: Opava 1–5 Pardubice; Střížkov 0–4 Pardubice
- Highest scoring: Vlašim 5–3 HFK Olomouc; Táborsko 5–3 Opava; Karviná 7–1 HFK Olomouc

The 2012–13 Czech 2. Liga was the 20th season of the Czech Second Division, the second tier of the Czech football league. The season began on 4 August 2012 and finished on 5 June 2013. In addition to the two lowest-placed clubs being relegated, third-placed HFK Olomouc were also relegated due to financial difficulties.

== Team changes ==
=== From 2. Liga ===
Promoted to Czech First League

- FC Vysočina Jihlava
- FC Zbrojovka Brno

Relegated to Moravian-Silesian Football League

- FK Fotbal Třinec

Relegated to Bohemian Football League

- Sparta B

=== To 2. Liga ===
HFK Olomouc returned to the Czech Second Division after an absence of three seasons.

Relegated from Czech First League

- Bohemians 1905
- FK Viktoria Žižkov

Promoted from Bohemian Football League

- FK Pardubice

Promoted from Moravian-Silesian Football League

- 1. HFK Olomouc

== Team overview ==
Location of clubs in the 2012–13 2. Liga

Club	Location	Stadium	Capacity	2011-12 Position
Bohemians 1905	Prague	Ďolíček	7,500	15th in Czech First League
Bohemians Prague	Prague	Stadion SK Prosek ^{Note 1}	1,000	5th
Čáslav	Čáslav	Stadion pod Hrádkem	2,575	14th
HFK Olomouc	Olomouc	Stadion FK Holice	2,900	1st in MSFL
Karviná	Karviná	Městský stadion (Karviná)	8,000	6th
Most	Most	Fotbalový stadion Josefa Masopusta	7,500	9th
Opava	Opava	Stadion v Městských sadech	7,758	8th
Pardubice	Pardubice	Pod Vinicí	2,500	2nd in ČFL
Sokolov	Sokolov	Stadion FK Baník Sokolov	5,000	3rd
Táborsko	Sezimovo Ústí	Sportovní areál Soukeník	900	12th
Ústí nad Labem	Ústí nad Labem	Městský stadion (Ústí nad Labem)	3,000	1st
Varnsdorf	Varnsdorf	Městský stadion v Kotlině	900	7th
Viktoria Žižkov	Prague	FK Viktoria Stadion	5,600	16th in Czech First League
Vlašim	Vlašim	Stadion Kollárova ulice	6,000	11th
Zlín	Zlín	Letná Stadion	6,375	10th
Znojmo	Znojmo	Městský stadion (Znojmo)	5,000	13th

Notes:

1. FK Bohemians Prague played their home match against Bohemians 1905 at Na Litavce in Příbram due to security concerns.

== League table ==
Pos	Team	Pld	W	D	L	GF	GA	GD	Pts	Promotion or relegation
1	Znojmo (C, P)	30	17	7	6	45	24	+21	58	Promotion to 2013–14 1. Liga
2	Bohemians 1905 (P)	30	16	8	6	50	25	+25	56	Promotion to 2013–14 1. Liga
3	HFK Olomouc (R)	30	15	5	10	41	44	−3	50 (Note: HFK 1–0 SOK; SOK 1–2 HFK)	Relegation to 2013–14 MSFL
4	Sokolov	30	14	8	8	36	26	+10	50	
5	Varnsdorf	30	15	4	11	49	37	+12	49	
6	Zlín	30	14	6	10	49	37	+12	48	
7	Pardubice	30	14	4	12	47	31	+16	46	
8	Viktoria Žižkov	30	12	9	9	38	30	+8	45	
9	Karviná	30	11	9	10	43	43	0	42	
10	Ústí nad Labem	30	11	6	13	32	42	−10	39	
11	Bohemians Prague (Střížkov)	30	6	17	7	30	33	−3	35	
12	Táborsko	30	8	10	12	35	42	−7	34	
13	Vlašim	30	8	7	15	37	58	−21	31 (Note: VLA 2–1 MOS; MOS 1–1 VLA)	
14	Most	30	8	7	15	33	48	−15	31	
15	Čáslav (R)	30	6	7	17	24	43	−19	25	Relegation to 2013–14 ČFL
16	Opava (R)	30	5	6	19	34	60	−26	21	Relegation to 2013–14 MSFL

Source: The Football Association of the Czech Republic
Rules for classification: 1) points; 2) head-to-head points; 3) head-to-head goal difference; 4) head-to-head goals scored; 5) goal difference; 6) number of goals scored.
(C) Champions; (P) Promoted; (R) Relegated

== Results ==
Home \ Away	ZLN	KAR	B05	ZNO	OPA	VDF	VLA	TAB	VŽI	CAS	ÚST	MOS	BOH	HFO	SOK	PAR
Zlín		2–1	0–1	3–1	2–2	3–0	1–2	3–2	1–1	3–0	5–0	1–1	0–0	3–0	2–1	2–1
Karviná	0–1		0–0	0–1	5–2	2–1	0–0	1–0	2–1	1–1	1–0	2–2	2–0	7–1	1–0	1–0
Bohemians 1905	2–1	5–1		1–0	1–0	2–1	2–3	2–2	1–1	3–0	3–0	2–0	0–0	5–1	3–0	3–1
Znojmo	2–0	3–0	2–0		2–1	3–0	6–1	1–0	0–0	1–2	2–0	3–0	2–1	0–0	1–1	3–2
Opava	2–1	1–1	1–4	0–1		3–0	5–2	2–0	1–2	2–3	1–2	1–1	1–1	0–1	0–1	1–5
Varnsdorf	2–0	4–1	0–2	0–1	2–0		3–2	4–1	1–1	3–1	1–0	4–0	0–0	3–0	3–1	2–0
Vlašim	2–2	4–1	0–0	0–3	2–0	2–1		0–2	0–1	0–0	1–2	2–1	2–2	5–3	1–1	0–2
Táborsko	1–1	1–3	1–1	0–0	5–3	1–3	2–1		3–1	0–0	3–1	2–0	1–1	2–0	0–1	1–1
Viktoria Žižkov	1–2	3–1	2–0	1–1	5–0	0–2	3–1	5–1		1–0	0–0	0–0	1–0	3–1	1–2	0–2
Čáslav	1–3	1–3	0–0	0–1	1–0	0–1	3–0	2–1	1–1		1–2	0–3	0–0	3–0	0–2	0–1
Ústí nad Labem	1–2	3–2	3–2	1–2	0–0	1–2	0–1	0–0	0–2	2–1		2–0	1–1	0–0	1–2	1–0
Most	0–3	2–0	0–1	1–1	5–1	4–2	1–1	2–1	2–0	2–1	1–3		1–0	0–2	0–3	1–2
Bohemians Prague (Střížkov)	2–1	2–2	3–2	4–1	1–1	0–0	3–1	0–0	2–0	0–0	1–1	3–2		1–1	1–1	0–4
HFK Olomouc	4–0	0–0	0–2	2–0	2–1	3–2	4–0	2–0	0–0	4–2	1–3	2–0	1–0		1–0	2–1
Sokolov	2–1	1–1	0–0	0–0	1–0	1–0	2–0	1–1	3–0	1–0	3–0	2–0	1–1	1–2		1–3
Pardubice	2–0	1–1	2–0	3–1	1–2	2–2	2–1	0–1	0–1	2–0	1–2	1–1	3–0	0–1	2–0	

Source: The Football Association of the Czech Republic
Legend: Blue = home team win; Yellow = draw; Red = away team win.

== Top goalscorers ==
As of 5 June 2013.

Rank	Player	Club	Goals
1	(Czech Republic) Lukáš Železník	Zlín	13
2	(Czech Republic) Vladimír Mišinský	Karviná	10
2	(Czech Republic) Miloslav Strnad	Táborsko	10
4	(Czech Republic) Matěj Kotiš	Varnsdorf	8
4	(Czech Republic) Radim Nepožitek	Znojmo	9
4	(Czech Republic) David Petrus	Pardubice	9
4	(Czech Republic) Jiří Schubert	Varnsdorf	9
8	(Czech Republic) David Čada	Baník Sokolov	8
8	(Czech Republic) Marek Heinz	Znojmo	8
8	(Czech Republic) Jan Jícha	Vlašim	8
8	(Czech Republic) Martin Surynek	Žižkov	8

== See also ==
- 2012–13 Czech First League
- 2012–13 Czech Cup
