= 2013–14 Czech National Football League =

Czech National Football League
- Season: 2013–14
- Champions: České Budějovice
- Promoted: České Budějovice; Hradec Králové
- Relegated: Loko Vltavín; Bohemians Prague
- Matches played: 240
- Goals scored: 606 (2.53 per match)
- Top goalscorer: David Vaněček II (17 goals)
- Best goalkeeper: Michal Toma (14 clean sheets)
- Biggest home win: Bohemians Prague 7–1 Frýdek-Místek
- Biggest away win: Táborsko 0–6 České Budějovice
- Highest scoring: Bohemians Prague 7–1 Frýdek-Místek
- Highest attendance: 7,465; Táborsko 0–6 České Budějovice (4 June 2014)
- Lowest attendance: 154; Loko Vltavín 1–1 Třinec (26 April 2014)

The 2013–14 Czech National Football League was the 21st season of the second tier of the Czech football league, and the first full season since the league was officially renamed from the 2. fotbalová liga to the fotbalová národní liga. The season began on 26 July 2013 and finished on 4 June 2014, with a winter break between November and March.

The title and promotion race for the two promotion places to the 2014–15 1. Liga was contended on the final matchday between Dynamo České Budějovice, Hradec Králové and Táborsko. The former two had been relegated from the 2012–13 Czech First League while the latter would be a newcomer to the top flight. České Budějovice sealed their title with a 6–0 away win against Táborsko, thus ending the only unbeaten home streak in the league, and Hradec Králové won second place by beating local rivals FK Pardubice 1–0. FK Bohemians Prague (Střížkov) and newcomers Loko Vltavín were relegated to the Bohemian Football League after losing both their matches on the 27th matchday.

== Team changes ==
=== From 2. Liga ===
In addition to the two lowest-placed clubs being relegated, third-placed HFK Olomouc were also relegated due to financial difficulties.

Promoted to Czech First League

- 1. SC Znojmo
- Bohemians 1905

Relegated to Moravian-Silesian Football League

- 1. HFK Olomouc
- SFC Opava

Relegated to Bohemian Football League

- FC Zenit Čáslav

=== To 2. Liga ===
Relegated from Czech First League

- SK Dynamo České Budějovice
- FC Hradec Králové

Promoted from Bohemian Football League

- Loko Vltavín

Promoted from Moravian-Silesian Football League

- FK Fotbal Třinec
- MFK Frýdek-Místek

== Team overview ==
Location of clubs in the 2013–14 2. Liga

Club	Location	Stadium	Capacity	2012-13 Position
Bohemians Prague (Střížkov)	Prague	Stadion SK Prosek	1,000	11th
České Budějovice	České Budějovice	Stadion Střelecký ostrov	6,681	15th in Czech First League
Frýdek-Místek	Frýdek-Místek	Stovky	12,000	2nd in MSFL
Hradec Králové	Hradec Králové	Všesportovní stadion	7,220	16th in Czech First League
Karviná	Karviná	Městský stadion (Karviná)	8,000	9th
Loko Vltavín	Prague	Stadion na Plynárně	3,000	1st in ČFL
Most	Most	Fotbalový stadion Josefa Masopusta	7,500	14th
Pardubice	Pardubice	Pod Vinicí	2,500	7th
Sokolov	Sokolov	Stadion FK Baník Sokolov	5,000	4th
Táborsko	Sezimovo Ústí	Sportovní areál Soukeník	5,000	12th
Třinec	Třinec	Stadion Rudolfa Labaje	2,200	1st in MSFL
Ústí nad Labem	Ústí nad Labem	Městský stadion (Ústí nad Labem)	3,000	10th
Varnsdorf	Varnsdorf	Městský stadion v Kotlině	5,000	5th
Viktoria Žižkov	Prague	FK Viktoria Stadion	5,600	8th
Vlašim	Vlašim	Stadion Kollárova ulice	6,000	13th
Zlín	Zlín	Letná Stadion	6,375	6th

== League table ==
Pos	Team	Pld	W	D	L	GF	GA	GD	Pts	Promotion or relegation
1	České Budějovice (C, P)	30	19	5	6	57	20	+37	62	Promotion to 2014–15 1. Liga
2	Hradec Králové (P)	30	18	7	5	54	27	+27	61	Promotion to 2014–15 1. Liga
3	Táborsko	30	17	8	5	46	27	+19	59	
4	Varnsdorf	30	13	8	9	42	31	+11	47	
5	Viktoria Žižkov	30	14	5	11	39	30	+9	47	
6	Sokolov	30	13	7	10	33	37	−4	46	
7	Ústí nad Labem	30	13	4	13	38	37	+1	43	
8	Karviná	30	12	6	12	44	39	+5	42	
9	Třinec	30	11	6	13	37	44	−7	39	
10	Zlín	30	10	7	13	33	30	+3	37	
11	Pardubice	30	10	7	13	32	32	0	37	
12	Most	30	10	7	13	34	46	−12	37	
13	Vlašim	30	11	3	16	29	46	−17	36	
14	Frýdek-Místek	30	8	10	12	33	40	−7	34	
15	Bohemians Prague (Střížkov) (R)	30	6	4	20	30	66	−36	22	Relegation to 2014–15 ČFL
16	Loko Vltavín (R)	30	4	8	18	25	54	−29	20	Relegation to 2014–15 ČFL

Source: http://www.fnliga.cz/tabulka.asp
Rules for classification: 1) points; 2) goal difference; 3) number of goals scored.
(C) Champions; (P) Promoted; (R) Relegated

== Results ==
Home \ Away	ZLN	KAR	ČBU	HRK	TRI	VDF	VLA	TAB	VŽI	VLT	ÚST	MOS	BOH	FRY	SOK	PAR
Zlín		3–0	1–1	1–1	3–0	0–1	2–1	0–1	1–2	1–2	0–0	2–1	2–0	0–1	5–0	2–1
Karviná	1–0		1–2	2–1	2–1	1–2	2–0	0–0	1–1	3–1	6–1	0–0	1–1	0–0	1–1	3–0
České Budějovice	2–0	4–0		1–1	3–0	1–0	0–0	2–0	4–0	1–0	0–2	4–1	1–0	3–0	0–3	1–0
Hradec Králové	2–0	2–1	3–2		3–1	3–1	4–2	0–2	0–0	2–0	3–1	4–1	4–1	3–0	2–2	2–2
Třinec	2–2	3–2	1–3	1–2		1–0	0–1	1–1	1–0	4–2	1–0	0–0	3–0	0–0	1–2	1–2
Varnsdorf	2–1	1–2	0–0	0–3	3–1		1–0	2–2	0–1	2–2	0–0	4–0	2–3	1–0	5–0	2–1
Vlašim	1–0	0–3	0–1	1–1	4–3	3–0		0–3	1–5	2–1	2–1	0–4	0–1	1–1	0–4	1–0
Táborsko	1–1	2–1	0–6	2–1	4–0	1–1	2–0		1–0	3–0	2–0	0–0	3–2	2–0	2–0	1–0
Viktoria Žižkov	0–1	2–0	1–0	0–1	0–2	1–3	0–1	0–2		3–2	2–0	2–0	1–1	2–2	1–2	2–0
Loko Vltavín	2–2	0–1	0–5	1–1	1–1	0–2	1–0	1–4	0–1		0–0	0–0	1–0	2–2	4–0	0–0
Ústí nad Labem	0–2	2–1	1–2	0–2	3–1	0–0	1–2	1–2	1–0	3–0		3–1	4–1	2–1	2–0	0–1
Most	2–0	1–4	3–2	0–1	0–2	0–2	2–0	2–1	2–2	4–1	2–1		2–0	1–0	0–0	2–2
Bohemians Prague (Střížkov)	0–1	1–0	0–3	1–0	1–3	2–4	0–4	1–1	0–4	3–0	1–3	0–2		7–1	1–1	0–3
Frýdek-Místek	0–0	4–1	0–2	3–1	0–1	0–0	0–2	3–0	0–2	1–0	2–3	3–0	5–1		1–1	1–1
Sokolov	2–0	1–3	1–0	0–0	0–0	1–0	1–0	1–1	1–2	2–1	0–2	3–1	2–0	0–1		2–0
Pardubice	1–0	2–1	1–1	0–1	0–1	1–1	2–0	1–0	0–2	1–0	0–1	3–0	5–1	1–1	1–2	

Source: http://www.fnliga.cz/zapas.asp
Legend: Blue = home team win; Yellow = draw; Red = away team win.

== Top goalscorers ==
Rank	Player	Club	Goals
1	(Czech Republic) David Vaněček II	Hradec Králové	17
2	(Czech Republic) Miloslav Strnad	Táborsko	13
3	(Czech Republic) Jiří Procházka	Most	12
4	(Czech Republic) Radek Voltr	Viktoria Žižkov	11
5	(Slovakia) Jaroslav Machovec	České Budějovice	10
5	(Czech Republic) Matěj Fiala	Karviná	10
5	(Czech Republic) Lukáš Železník	Zlín	10
8	(Czech Republic) Hynek Prokeš	Frýdek-Místek	9
8	(Czech Republic) Zdeněk Linhart	České Budějovice	9
8	(Czech Republic) David Čada	Sokolov	9

== See also ==
- 2013–14 Czech First League
- 2013–14 Czech Cup
