= 2014–15 Czech National Football League =

Czech National Football League
- Season: 2014–15
- Champions: Sigma Olomouc
- Promoted: Sigma Olomouc, Zlín
- Relegated: Kolín, Most, Žižkov
- Matches: 240
- Goals: 644 (2.68 per match)
- Top goalscorer: Václav Vašíček (13 goals)
- Biggest home win: Olomouc 7–0 Sokolov
- Biggest away win: Kolín 0–5 Varnsdorf; Opava 0–5 Pardubice
- Highest scoring: Olomouc 7–0 Sokolov

The 2014–15 Czech National Football League is the 22nd season of the Czech Republic's second tier football league. The season started on 2 August 2014 and ran until May 2015, with a winter break between November and March.

== Team changes ==
=== From FNL ===
- SK Dynamo České Budějovice (promoted to 2014–15 Czech First League)
- FC Hradec Králové (promoted to 2014–15 Czech First League)
- FK Bohemians Prague (Střížkov) (relegated to 2014–15 Bohemian Football League)
- Loko Vltavín (relegated to 2014–15 Bohemian Football League)

=== To FNL ===
- SK Sigma Olomouc (relegated from 2013–14 Czech First League after 30 years in the top flight)
- 1. SC Znojmo (relegated from 2013–14 Czech First League)
- FK Kolín (promoted from 2013–14 Bohemian Football League)
- SFC Opava (promoted from 2013–14 Moravian–Silesian Football League)

== Team overview ==
Location of clubs in the 2014–15 2. Liga

Club	Location	Stadium	Capacity	2013-14 Position
MFK Frýdek-Místek	Frýdek-Místek	Stovky	12,000	14th
MFK Karviná	Karviná	Městský stadion (Karviná)	8,000	8th
FK Kolín	Kolín	Mestský stadion (Kolín)	2,800	1st in ČFL
FK Baník Most	Most	Fotbalový stadion Josefa Masopusta	7,500	12th
SFC Opava	Opava	Stadion v Městských sadech	7,758	1st in MSFL
FK Pardubice	Pardubice	Pod Vinicí	2,500	11th
SK Sigma Olomouc	Olomouc	Andrův stadion	12,566	15th in 1. Liga
FK Baník Sokolov	Sokolov	Stadion FK Baník Sokolov	5,000	6th
FK MAS Táborsko	Sezimovo Ústí	Sportovní areál Soukeník	5,000	3rd
FK Fotbal Třinec	Třinec	Stadion Rudolfa Labaje	2,200	9th
FK Ústí nad Labem	Ústí nad Labem	Městský stadion (Ústí nad Labem)	3,000	7th
FK Varnsdorf	Varnsdorf	Městský stadion v Kotlině	5,000	4th
FK Viktoria Žižkov	Prague	FK Viktoria Stadion	5,600	5th
FC Graffin Vlašim	Vlašim	Stadion Kollárova ulice	6,000	13th
FC Fastav Zlín	Zlín	Letná Stadion	6,375	10th
1. SC Znojmo	Znojmo	Městský stadion (Znojmo)	5,000	16th in 1. Liga

== League table ==
Pos	Team	Pld	W	D	L	GF	GA	GD	Pts	Promotion or relegation
1	Sigma Olomouc (C, P)	30	19	6	5	64	25	+39	63	Promotion to 2015–16 1. Liga
2	Varnsdorf (Note: FK Varnsdorf were not promoted to 2015–16 Czech First League as their stadium failed to meet the league requirements.)	30	17	8	5	47	27	+20	59	
3	Zlín (P)	30	16	7	7	53	32	+21	55	Promotion to 2015–16 1. Liga
4	Viktoria Žižkov (Note: Viktoria Žižkov were denied a license for the 2015-16 season.) (R)	30	16	7	7	50	32	+18	55	Relegation to 2015–16 ČFL
5	Sokolov	30	13	9	8	44	39	+5	48	
6	Táborsko	30	13	8	9	55	42	+13	47	
7	Karviná	30	12	10	8	39	31	+8	46	
8	Pardubice	30	12	9	9	37	34	+3	45	
9	Opava	30	11	9	10	36	35	+1	42	
10	Vlašim	30	11	6	13	36	50	−14	39	
11	Znojmo	30	11	5	14	37	43	−6	38	
12	Ústí nad Labem	30	10	4	16	34	46	−12	34	
13	Třinec	30	8	6	16	33	51	−18	30	
14	Frýdek-Místek	30	8	4	18	28	41	−13	28	
15	Most (R)	30	5	6	19	25	51	−26	21	Relegation to 2015–16 ČFL
16	Kolín (R)	30	3	6	21	26	74	−48	15	Relegation to 2015–16 ČFL

Source: Fotbalová národní liga
Rules for classification: 1) points; 2) goal difference; 3) number of goals scored.
(C) Champions; (P) Promoted; (R) Relegated

== Results ==
Home \ Away	FRY	KAR	KOL	MOS	OPA	PAR	SIG	SOK	TAB	TRI	ÚST	VDF	VŽI	VLA	ZLN	ZNO
Frýdek-Místek		2–4	1–0	0–0	2–3	2–1	0–1	0–1	1–1	1–2	3–1	0–1	1–0	1–1	0–2	1–0
Karviná	1–0		1–0	1–1	1–0	1–3	2–2	2–1	2–2	3–1	0–1	0–0	1–1	2–0	2–1	3–1
Kolín	0–3	0–0		3–1	0–1	2–4	0–2	1–4	3–1	3–1	1–0	0–5	0–4	1–3	1–2	0–4
Most	3–2	0–1	1–1		0–3	2–5	0–2	0–1	0–1	2–3	0–1	2–1	2–2	0–1	0–0	2–0
Opava	2–0	0–0	3–1	3–0		0–5	0–0	0–0	3–3	3–1	1–0	0–1	2–1	2–1	3–1	0–0
Pardubice	1–0	2–1	2–0	0–0	0–0		1–2	0–3	0–3	1–0	3–2	0–1	1–1	1–1	0–0	2–1
Sigma Olomouc	3–0	2–2	4–1	3–2	1–1	1–0		7–0	4–0	1–0	5–0	2–1	0–1	6–0	4–2	0–2
Sokolov	1–0	1–1	3–0	2–0	2–1	1–1	3–2		1–1	1–1	1–1	2–0	0–1	2–0	0–2	3–1
Táborsko	1–0	1–1	3–0	3–0	2–2	0–1	1–2	2–2		3–1	3–1	1–1	0–4	3–1	2–0	2–0
Třinec	3–1	1–3	2–2	1–0	2–1	0–1	1–3	0–2	1–0		3–1	1–4	0–0	0–1	0–3	2–2
Ústí nad Labem	2–3	1–0	5–1	1–3	1–0	3–0	1–0	4–3	0–4	1–3		0–0	0–0	2–0	1–2	1–2
Varnsdorf	1–0	3–1	3–1	3–1	2–1	0–0	0–0	1–1	2–1	3–1	1–1		0–0	2–0	3–0	4–1
Viktoria Žižkov	2–0	1–0	4–0	3–1	2–0	1–1	2–1	4–2	3–1	2–0	1–0	3–0		3–0	1–2	0–2
Vlašim	0–2	2–1	3–3	2–0	2–0	1–0	1–1	1–1	2–4	3–2	1–0	1–3	2–1		2–3	0–2
Zlín	1–1	1–0	1–1	2–0	3–0	4–0	0–1	3–0	3–2	0–0	2–1	6–0	3–2	1–1		1–2
Znojmo	2–1	0–2	3–2	0–2	1–1	1–1	1–2	2–0	1–4	2–0	0–1	0–1	1–0	1–3	2–2	

Source: Fotbalová národní liga
Legend: Blue = home team win; Yellow = draw; Red = away team win.

== Statistics ==
=== Goalscorers ===
Correct as of 23 November 2014

8 goals

- Zdeněk Folprecht (FK Viktoria Žižkov)
- Lubomír Urgela (MFK OKD Karviná)

7 goals

- Lukáš Budínský (MFK OKD Karviná)
- Marek Červenka (FK Baník Sokolov)
- Jakub Plšek (SK Sigma Olomouc)

6 goals

- Zbyněk Musiol (FC MAS Táborsko)
- Michal Ordoš (SK Sigma Olomouc)
- Jan Pázler (1. SC Znojmo FK)
- Miloslav Strnad (FC MAS Táborsko)
- Igor Súkenník (FK Viktoria Žižkov)
- Lukáš Železník (FC Fastav Zlín)
- Libor Žondra (1. SC Znojmo FK)

5 goals

- Radim Breite (FK Varnsdorf)
- Adnan Džafić (FC MAS Táborsko)
- Petr Javorek (FC MAS Táborsko)
- Martin Matúš (MFK Frýdek-Místek)
- Tomáš Smola (FK Ústí nad Labem)

== See also ==
- 2014–15 Czech First League
- 2014–15 Czech Cup
