= Leoš Kalvoda =

Czech footballer and manager

Personal information
- Date of birth: 26 March 1958 (age 68)
- Place of birth: Brno, Czechoslovakia
- Positions: Defender; midfielder

Team information
- Current team: MFK Frýdek-Místek (Head coach)

Senior career*
Years	Team	Apps	(Gls)
1982–1990	Sigma Olomouc	180	(17)

Managerial career
- 2000–2001: Sigma Olomouc
- 2002: MŠK Žilina
- 2002–2003: FC Hradec Králové
- 2004–2007: HFK Olomouc
- 2008: 1. FC Slovácko
- 2008–2010: MFK Karviná
- 2012: 1. FC Přerov
- 2012–2014: 1. SC Znojmo
- 2014–2015: Sigma Olomouc
- 2016: MFK Frýdek-Místek
- 2016: FK Mladá Boleslav
- 2017–: MFK Frýdek-Místek
- * Club domestic league appearances and goals

Leoš Kalvoda (born 26 March 1958) is a Czech football manager and former player. He is currently the manager of MFK Frýdek-Místek in the Czech First League.

As a player, he played in the Czechoslovak First League for Sigma Olomouc. As a manager, he has had a number of clubs, including spells in the Czech First League with Sigma Olomouc and Hradec Králové. Arguably his greatest achievement to date is winning the Slovak Super Liga in 2002 with Slovak side Žilina.

== Playing career ==
As a player, Kalvoda could play as either a defender or midfielder. During the 1980s he played for Sigma Olomouc in the Czechoslovak First League, scoring 17 goals in 180 league matches.

== Management career ==
=== First League and European football ===
Kalvoda took over as manager of Sigma Olomouc towards the end of the 1999–2000 Czech First League season. In his first full season with the club, Sigma finished third in the league and qualified for the following season's UEFA Cup. However the club lost in the first round against Spanish side Celta de Vigo. Following an indifferent start to the 2001–02 Czech First League league campaign, with the club 13th after 11 games, Kalvoda resigned as manager in October 2001.

Kalvoda joined Slovak side Žilina as manager in January 2002, leading the club to their first-ever league title in the 2001–02 Slovak Superliga. The club subsequently played in the UEFA Champions League but lost to Swiss club FC Basel in the second qualifying round, resulting in Kalvoda's dismissal.

He went on to Hradec Králové in December 2002, a club who were lying in penultimate place in the Gambrinus liga. He arrived as the club's new manager, replacing Petr Uličný and signed a deal lasting until June 2004. Hradec were relegated in May 2003 at the end of the league season.

=== Second League and lower ===
Although Kalvoda stayed at Hradec Králové in spite of their relegation to the second division, he was with the club for just a short time longer; with just three wins in the first six games, Kalvoda was removed from his position in September 2003.

Kalvoda took charge of HFK Olomouc in March 2004, initially alongside Vítězslav Kolda. He stayed on as the club's manager until 2007, when he was appointed manager of Czech 2. Liga side Slovácko during the winter break of the 2007–08 season. His tenure at Slovácko lasted just five months before he was replaced in May 2008, before the season had finished.

July 2008 saw Kalvoda appointed to the vacant manager's position at MFK Karviná.

In spring 2012, Kalvoda saved Czech Fourth Division side Přerov from relegation. He attracted the attention of Czech 2. Liga side Znojmo, replacing Bohumil Smrček as the manager there in June 2012. In his first season with the club, Kalvoda brought in players such as Marek Heinz in the winter break and went on to celebrate promotion with Znojmo at the end of the season. He left Znojmo at the end of the 2013–14 season, following their relegation from the Czech First League.

== Personal life ==
Kalvoda's son, Ondřej, played club football for HFK Olomouc.

== Honours ==
=== Managerial ===
Žilina

- Slovak Super Liga (1): 2001–02

Znojmo

- Czech 2. Liga (1): 2012–13

Sigma Olomouc

- Czech 2. Liga (1): 2014–15
