= 2011–12 Czech 2. Liga =

2. česká fotbalová liga
- Season: 2011–12
- Champions: Ústí nad Labem
- Promoted: Jihlava; Brno
- Relegated: Třinec; Sparta B
- Matches played: 240
- Goals scored: 591 (2.46 per match)
- Top goalscorer: Jiří Mlika (13)
- Biggest home win: Vlašim 7–0 Most
- Biggest away win: Táborsko 1–6 Opava
- Highest scoring: Jihlava 2–5 Ústí nad Labem; Varnsdorf 2–5 Sparta B Vlašim 7–0 Most; Táborsko 1–6 Opava

The 2011–12 Czech 2. Liga is the 19th season of the Czech Second Division, the second tier of the Czech football league. The season began on 5 August 2011 and concluded on 26 May 2012. The winter break commenced after 19 November 2011 and the league restarted on 10 March 2012.

FK Ústí nad Labem secured promotion to the Czech First League on 12 May 2012. However, due to their stadium, which did not comply with league regulations, Ústí were not granted a license to play in the following season's Czech First League. The promotion place therefore went to fourth-placed Brno.

== Team changes ==
=== From 2. Liga ===
Promoted to Czech First League

- FK Dukla Prague
- FK Viktoria Žižkov

Relegated to Moravian-Silesian Football League

- FC Hlučín

Relegated to Bohemian Football League

- SK Kladno

=== To 2. Liga ===
Opava returned to the Czech Second Division after a one-season absence, winning promotion from the MSFL at the first attempt.

Relegated from Czech First League

- FC Zbrojovka Brno
- FK Ústí nad Labem

Promoted from Bohemian Football League

- FK Bohemians Prague (Střížkov)

Promoted from Moravian-Silesian Football League

- SFC Opava

== Team overview ==
Location of clubs in the 2011–12 2. Liga

Club	Location	Stadium	Capacity	2010-11 Position
Bohemians Prague	Prague	Stadion SK Prosek	1,000	1st in ČFL
Čáslav	Čáslav	Stadion pod Hrádkem	2,575	8th
Jihlava	Jihlava	Stadion v Jiráskově ulici	4,075	3rd
Karviná	Karviná	Městský stadion (Karviná)	8,000	4th
Most	Most	Fotbalový stadion Josefa Masopusta	7,500	12th
Opava	Opava	Stadion v Městských sadech	7,758	1st in MSFL
Sezimovo Ústí	Sezimovo Ústí	Sportovní areál Soukeník	900	9th
Sokolov	Sokolov	Stadion FK Baník Sokolov	5,000	6th
Sparta Prague B	Prague	Stadion SC Horní Počernice ^{Note 1}	3,400	10th
Třinec	Třinec	Stadion Rudolfa Labaje	2,200	5th
Ústí nad Labem	Ústí nad Labem	Městský stadion (Ústí nad Labem)	3,000	16th in Czech First League
Varnsdorf	Varnsdorf	Městský stadion v Kotlině	5,000	13th
Vlašim	Vlašim	Stadion Kollárova ulice	6,000	7th
Zbrojovka Brno	Brno	Městský stadion (Brno)	12,550	15th in Czech First League
Zlín	Zlín	Letná Stadion	6,375	11th
Znojmo	Znojmo	Městský stadion (Znojmo)	5,000	14th

Notes:

1. Sparta B does not have a home stadium, for the 2011–12 season Sparta B are ground-sharing at Stadion SC Horní Počernice.

== League table ==
Pos	Team	Pld	W	D	L	GF	GA	GD	Pts	Promotion or relegation
1	Ústí nad Labem (Note: Brno were promoted in place of Ústí due to the latter's stadium not meeting Czech First League standards.) (C)	30	19	4	7	52	35	+17	61	
2	Jihlava (P)	30	16	7	7	45	29	+16	55	Promotion to 2012–13 1. Liga
3	Sokolov	30	15	7	8	43	31	+12	52	
4	Zbrojovka Brno (P)	30	13	10	7	37	29	+8	49	Promotion to 2012–13 1. Liga
5	Bohemians Prague (Střížkov)	30	14	6	10	43	31	+12	48	
6	Karviná	30	12	7	11	36	35	+1	43	
7	Varnsdorf	30	10	12	8	33	34	−1	42	
8	Opava	30	11	8	11	46	36	+10	41	
9	Most	30	11	5	14	31	44	−13	38	
10	Tescoma Zlín	30	9	9	12	28	36	−8	36 (Note: ZLI 2–1 VLA; VLA 1–1 ZLI)	
11	Vlašim	30	9	9	12	36	38	−2	36	
12	Táborsko (Sezimovo Ústí) (Note: Táborsko played until 31 December 2011 as Sezimovo Ústí before changing their name.)	30	10	4	16	37	51	−14	34 (Note: TAB: 6 pts; ZNO: 5 pts > GD 5-4; CAS: 5 pts > GD 4-5)	
13	Znojmo	30	8	10	12	28	35	−7	34	
14	Čáslav	30	8	10	12	27	39	−12	34	
15	Třinec (R)	30	7	9	14	31	41	−10	30	Relegation to 2012-13 ČFL or MSFL
16	Sparta Prague B (R)	30	8	3	19	37	46	−9	27	Relegation to 2012-13 ČFL or MSFL

Source: The Football Association of the Czech Republic
Rules for classification: 1) points; 2) head-to-head points; 3) head-to-head goal difference; 4) head-to-head goals scored; 5) goal difference; 6) number of goals scored.
(C) Champions; (P) Promoted; (R) Relegated

== Results ==
Home \ Away	SPA	VDF	ZLI	OPA	KAR	MOS	JIH	SOK	BOH	TAB	BRN	CAS	TRI	ÚST	ZNO	VLA
Sparta Prague B		0–1	0–1	0–1	1–2	0–2	1–2	1–2	3–1	2–0	2–2	3–0	3–1	0–1	1–4	1–1
Varnsdorf	2–5		2–0	0–0	1–1	2–1	4–0	1–3	1–1	3–3	1–2	2–2	1–0	2–0	1–1	0–1
Tescoma Zlín	2–0	0–0		2–0	0–1	2–1	0–1	1–1	3–0	1–2	0–0	1–0	2–0	2–2	3–1	2–1
Opava	1–0	5–0	0–0		3–2	2–2	0–2	2–2	2–3	0–1	1–4	4–0	0–0	3–1	0–1	4–1
Karviná	2–1	0–1	1–0	2–0		2–1	1–1	2–1	2–0	1–1	0–1	1–2	2–1	1–1	4–1	3–1
Most	4–2	0–1	1–0	1–4	1–0		0–0	0–0	1–0	3–0	1–0	3–2	1–4	0–2	0–0	2–0
Jihlava	1–0	0–1	3–3	3–1	1–1	3–0		1–1	0–3	4–0	1–0	3–0	3–0	2–5	2–0	2–0
Sokolov	2–0	0–0	2–0	1–0	2–0	0–2	3–1		3–0	0–2	2–2	3–1	2–1	3–2	2–2	0–1
Bohemians Prague (Střížkov)	3–2	1–2	0–0	1–2	1–0	1–0	2–0	3–0		1–2	0–1	0–0	1–2	2–0	4–0	1–1
Táborsko	1–3	1–1	2–0	1–6	0–2	2–0	0–1	1–2	2–4		1–2	3–0	2–1	5–0	1–0	0–0
Brno	1–1	3–1	0–0	0–1	4–1	2–0	0–2	1–0	1–1	2–1		1–0	0–0	1–4	2–0	0–0
Čáslav	2–0	0–0	3–0	2–1	0–0	1–2	0–0	0–2	1–1	2–0	1–0		0–0	1–2	1–1	2–1
Třinec	0–2	2–2	4–1	1–1	2–0	0–0	1–3	1–0	0–4	2–0	1–2	1–1		1–2	2–1	1–2
Ústí nad Labem	2–1	1–0	3–0	2–1	4–2	4–2	0–0	2–0	0–1	2–1	2–2	2–0	1–0		1–0	1–0
Znojmo	0–1	0–0	4–1	0–0	0–0	1–0	1–0	0–1	0–2	3–1	3–0	1–1	0–0	2–1		0–2
Vlašim	2–1	1–0	1–1	1–1	2–0	7–0	1–3	1–3	0–1	3–1	1–1	1–2	2–2	0–2	1–1	

Source: The Football Association of the Czech Republic
Legend: Blue = home team win; Yellow = draw; Red = away team win.

== Top goalscorers ==
As of 26 May 2012

Rank	Player	Club	Goals
1	(Czech Republic) Jiří Mlika	Sokolov / Most	13
2	(Czech Republic) Miloslav Strnad	Vlašim	12
2	(Czech Republic) Stanislav Tecl	Jihlava	12
4	(Lithuania) Tomas Radzinevičius	Opava	11
5	(Czech Republic) Václav Vašíček	Znojmo	10

== See also ==
- 2011–12 Czech First League
- 2011–12 Czech Cup
