= Joseph Hoffmann =

Joseph Hoffmann or Josef Hoffmann (the surname spelled with a double f) may refer to:

- Josef Hoffmann (1870–1956), Austrian architect
- Josef Hoffmann (footballer) (born 1978), Czech footballer
- Joseph L. Hoffmann, American professor of law
- R. Joseph Hoffmann (born 1957), American historian

== See also ==
- Joseph Hofmann (disambiguation), the surname spelled with a single f
- Joseph Hoffman (1909–1997), American screenwriter
- Joseph F. Hoffman (1925-2022), American scientist
