= Vaněček =

Vaněček (feminine Vaněčková) is a Czech surname. Notable people with the surname include:

- David Vaněček (footballer, born 1983), Czech footballer
- David Vaněček (footballer, born 1991), Czech footballer and under-19 national team representative
- František Vaněček, Czech gymnast
- Vítek Vaněček, Czech ice hockey player
