= David Vaněček =

David Vaněček may refer to

- David Vaněček (footballer born 1983), Czech footballer
- David Vaněček (footballer, born 1991), Czech footballer and under-19 national team representative
