= Marek Heinz =

Czech footballer (born 1977)

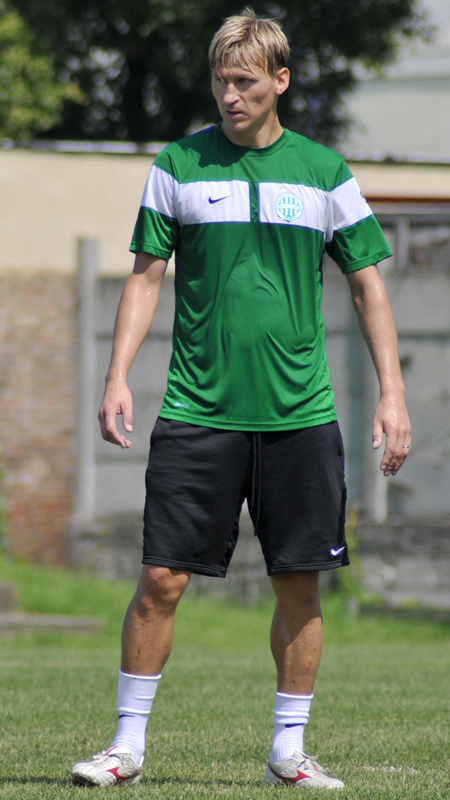
- Heinz training with Ferencváros in 2010

Personal information
- Full name: Marek Heinz
- Date of birth: 4 August 1977 (age 49)
- Place of birth: Olomouc, Czechoslovakia
- Height: 1.88 m (6 ft 2 in)
- Position: Striker

Team information
- Current team: Sigma Olomouc B (assistant)

Youth career
- Lokomotiva Hodolany
- Olomouc-Holice
- Sigma MŽ Olomouc

Senior career*
| Years | Team | Apps | (Gls) |
| 1996–1997 | → AFK Lázně Bohdaneč (loan) | 8 | (0) |
| 1997–2000 | Sigma Olomouc | 70 | (17) |
| 2000–2003 | Hamburger SV | 52 | (5) |
| 2003 | → Arminia Bielefeld (loan) | 14 | (0) |
| 2003–2004 | Baník Ostrava | 32 | (19) |
| 2004–2005 | Borussia Mönchengladbach | 23 | (1) |
| 2005–2006 | Galatasaray | 18 | (3) |
| 2006–2007 | Saint-Étienne | 28 | (4) |
| 2007–2008 | Nantes | 16 | (1) |
| 2008–2009 | 1. FC Brno | 21 | (2) |
| 2009–2010 | Kapfenberger SV | 27 | (5) |
| 2010–2011 | Ferencváros | 25 | (7) |
| 2011–2013 | Sigma Olomouc | 21 | (4) |
| 2013 | → 1. SC Znojmo (loan) | 20 | (10) |
| 2013 | → HFK Olomouc (loan) | | |
| Total | | 375 | (78) |

International career
| 1997 | Czech Republic U20 | 4 | (0) |
| 1998–2000 | Czech Republic U21 | 20 | (6) |
| 2000 | Czech Republic Olympic | 5 | (1) |
| 2000–2006 | Czech Republic | 30 | (5) |

Managerial career
- 2025–: Sigma Olomouc B (assistant)
Medal record
Men's football
Representing Czech Republic
UEFA European Championship
| Bronze medal – third place | 2004 Portugal |
- * Club domestic league appearances and goals

Marek Heinz (born 4 August 1977) is a Czech assistant manager for Sigma Olomouc B since 2025 and a former professional footballer who played as a striker. Heinz was top scorer of the Czech First League in the 2003–04 season, concurrently celebrating the league championship with Baník Ostrava. His other Czech clubs included Sigma Olomouc, where he started his professional career, 1. FC Brno and 1. SC Znojmo. Heinz played in the domestic leagues of five other countries: Germany's Bundesliga, where he represented Hamburger SV, Arminia Bielefeld and Borussia Mönchengladbach; Turkey's Süper Lig, which he won with Galatasaray in 2006; Ligue 1 and Ligue 2 of France, playing for Saint-Étienne and Nantes; the Austrian Bundesliga, in which he played for Kapfenberger SV and lastly Hungary, playing for Ferencváros in the Nemzeti Bajnokság I.

Heinz made 30 appearances for the Czech Republic, scoring 5 goals in an international career which spanned from 2000 to 2006. He scored two goals in UEFA Euro 2004 in Portugal and played in his second major tournament at the 2006 FIFA World Cup in Germany.

== Club career ==
=== Early career ===
As a youth player, Heinz played for such Czech football clubs as Lokomotiva Hodolany, Olomouc-Holice and Sigma MŽ Olomouc. Although he trained as a car mechanic and considered becoming involved in natural science, Heinz went into professional football, playing for Sigma Olomouc with a short loan spell at Lázně Bohdaneč before moving to Germany in 2000.

=== First stint in Germany and Return to the Czech Republic (2000–2004) ===
Heinz headed to German side Hamburger SV in 2000. A surplus to requirements under head coach Kurt Jara midway through the 2002–03 season, he joined Arminia Bielefeld for the remainder of the campaign with an option to make the move permanent if Bielefeld avoided relegation. Bielefeld were relegated from the Bundesliga after losing their final game of the season in May 2003.

Baník Ostrava signed Heinz from the Hamburg club ahead of the 2003–04 season. He made his debut for the club in July 2003, providing two assists in a win against České Budějovice. Heinz scored his first Baník goal in a 1–1 draw against Liberec just a week into the season, ultimately leading Baník to the Czech title in the 2003–04 Czech First League and finishing the season as the league's top goalscorer with 19 goals. He formed a partnership with Miroslav Matušovič which returned 29 goals for the club that season.

=== Second stint in Germany and Turkey (2004–2006) ===
After Euro 2004 Heinz returned to Germany, signing for Borussia Mönchengladbach at the start of the 2004–05 season. He scored his first and ultimately only Bundesliga goal for Gladbach in a 3–1 victory against Werder Bremen. Heinz played 14 matches in the first half of the season but was demoted to the amateur reserve side in March 2005 after the club appointed Dick Advocaat as head coach mid-season. A proposed move back to the Czech Republic to play for Sparta Prague fell through the same month after the involved clubs were unable to agree on a transfer fee. He left Borussia Mönchengladbach in August 2005, having made 23 Bundesliga appearances and scored one goal.

In September 2005, Heinz joined Turkish side Galatasaray on a three-year contract. He scored his first goal for his new club in a 4–1 win over Trabzonspor in October, Following its victory in the 2005–06 Süper Lig, Heinz left the club on 31 August 2006 and became a free agent.

=== France and third stint in the Czech Republic (2006–2009) ===
In September 2006, Heinz signed a one-year contract with French side Saint-Étienne to play under Czech head coach Ivan Hašek. In a 2–0 win against Lorient in early December, Heinz scored a left-footed free-kick from 18 metres, with the ball finishing in the goalkeeper's top-left corner. It was shortlisted as one of the five best goals of matchday 16. He scored 4 goals in 28 Ligue 1 matches for Saint-Étienne but left the club after Hašek was replaced as head coach by Laurent Roussey.

On 21 August 2007, Heinz signed with another French club Nantes to play in the 2007–08 Ligue 2. He scored in the third round of the 2007–08 Coupe de la Ligue against Monaco, although a 2–0 half time lead was not enough as Monaco secured the win and progression to the fourth round with three second-half goals. Heinz played a total of 16 league matches, scoring once, as Nantes achieved promotion to the French top flight.

On 30 September 2008, Heinz returned the Czech league, signing a two-year contract with Brno. He scored his first league goal for Brno with a header in a 2–0 win against Banik Ostrava on 22 February 2009. He left the club after a single season, having scored two league goals in 21 appearances.

=== Austria and Hungary (2009–2011) ===
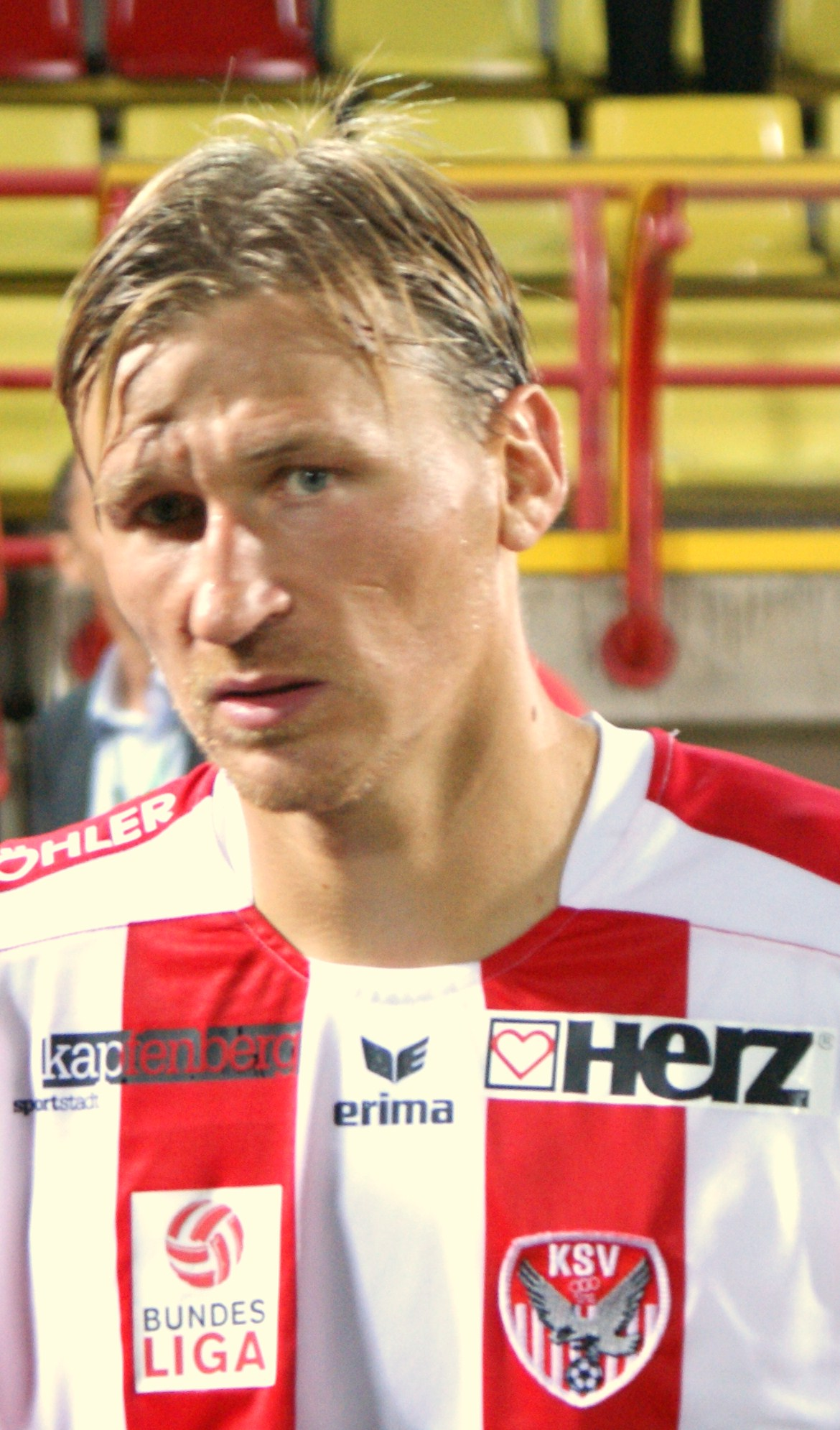
Heinz at Kapfenberger, 2009

On 29 June 2009 it was announced that Heinz had signed a one-year contract with Kapfenberger SV to play in the 2009–10 Austrian Football Bundesliga. He made his competitive debut for the club in a 1–0 home loss to Ried in July 2009. Heinz was suspended for three matches in February 2010 for being verbally abusive after a 4–3 loss against Austria Vienna. He left the club as his contract expired after the season.

Heinz moved to his fifth foreign country to play football in July 2010, signing a one-year deal with Hungarian side Ferencváros. He made his debut for the club in the opening game of the 2010–11 Nemzeti Bajnokság I season, a 2–1 win against Paks, scoring a follow-up shot after his initial shot was blocked. Heinz scored 7 goals in 25 league appearances for the club, receiving a first-half red card in a 6–0 Derbi loss against Újpest as well as another red card in his final match for the club, which was against Szombathelyi Haladás.

=== Return to Olomouc and Znojmo (2011–2013) ===
Heinz returned to Olomouc in 2011, signing a two-year contract. Despite playing 20 matches in his first season, Heinz played just seventeen minutes in one substitute appearance in the first half of his second season. In November 2012, manager Roman Pivarník announced Heinz was surplus to requirements and free to find another club.

He joined second league 1. SC Znojmo on loan in January 2013 for the rest of the season. In his league debut for Znojmo at the start of March 2013, Heinz scored a hat trick against Karvina in a 3–0 win. His opening goal came after 10 minutes with a successful shot from less than 20 metres from goal. In the 17th minute Heinz made it 2–0 with a curling shot over the goalkeeper's head and the scoring was complete in the 49th minute when he nutmegged the goalkeeper. On 23 March Znojmo defeated Bohemians 1905 2–0 with goals from Heinz and Radim Nepožitek, lifting the side to first place in the Second League table. Heinz contributed 8 goals in 12 league matches. helping Znojmo finish the season top of the league to win promotion to the Czech First League for the 2013–14 season. Znojmo became the third Czech First League club that employed Heinz.

In the 2013–14 season match played on 17 August he was one of two players, alongside fellow player Jan Kopic, to score twice in a 5–5 draw away at Jablonec. In September 2013, after Znojmo started with nine consecutive winless games, Heinz agreed to part ways with the club. He made eight appearances for Znojmo in the First League, all starts, being unavailable for selection once due to suspension. He later signed on loan for third-tier side HFK Olomouc, his former youth team, until the end of 2013.

== International career ==
=== Youth teams ===
Heinz played for his country at various age groups. He played for the under-20 (4 appearances without scoring) and the under-21 sides (17 matches, 6 goals). He took part in the 2000 UEFA European Under-21 Championship held in Slovakia, where the Czech side finished as runners-up after losing 2–1 to Italy in the final. Heinz provided the assist to Tomáš Došek in the 51st minute of the final, which made the score 1–1, although a free-kick from Italian player Andrea Pirlo in the 81st minute decided the game.

==== 2000 Summer Olympics ====
Heinz was part of the Czech squad that participated in the football tournament at the 2000 Summer Olympics in Australia. On 13 September he played in the opening group match against the United States, being fouled by Chad McCarty, which resulted in a penalty to the Czechs. Lukáš Došek converted the spot kick, equalising the game for the final score of 2–2. He was one of four forwards who started the match in Brisbane against Kuwait on 16 September, although he played in midfield. Heinz scored the opening goal of the game after just 64 seconds but Kuwait scored three second-half goals to ultimately register a 3–2 win. After receiving yellow cards in both of the first two matches, Heinz was unavailable for selection for the third group game against Cameroon, which the Czech team drew 1–1 and got eliminated from the tournament.

=== Senior side ===
Heinz made his debut for the Czech Republic senior side on 16 August 2000 in a 1–0 loss against Slovenia. After his second appearance in 2001, more than two years passed before he was next called up to the national team squad by Karel Brückner in September 2003 ahead of a Euro 2004 qualification match against Austria, due to injuries to first-choice strikers Milan Baroš and Jan Koller. With qualification for the tournament already decided, Heinz had an opportunity to score in the seventh minute but his shot from 10 metres hit the post. He was however involved in the opening goal, passing to Pavel Nedvěd, who supplied the ball to Marek Jankulovski to open the scoring. The match finished 3–2 in the Czech Republic's favour. Heinz scored his first goal for the national team in a November 2003 friendly game against Canada, hitting the back of the net with the Czechs' second goal in a 5–1 win, although the stadium announcer incorrectly reported the goalscorer as Karel Poborský.

==== Euro 2004 ====
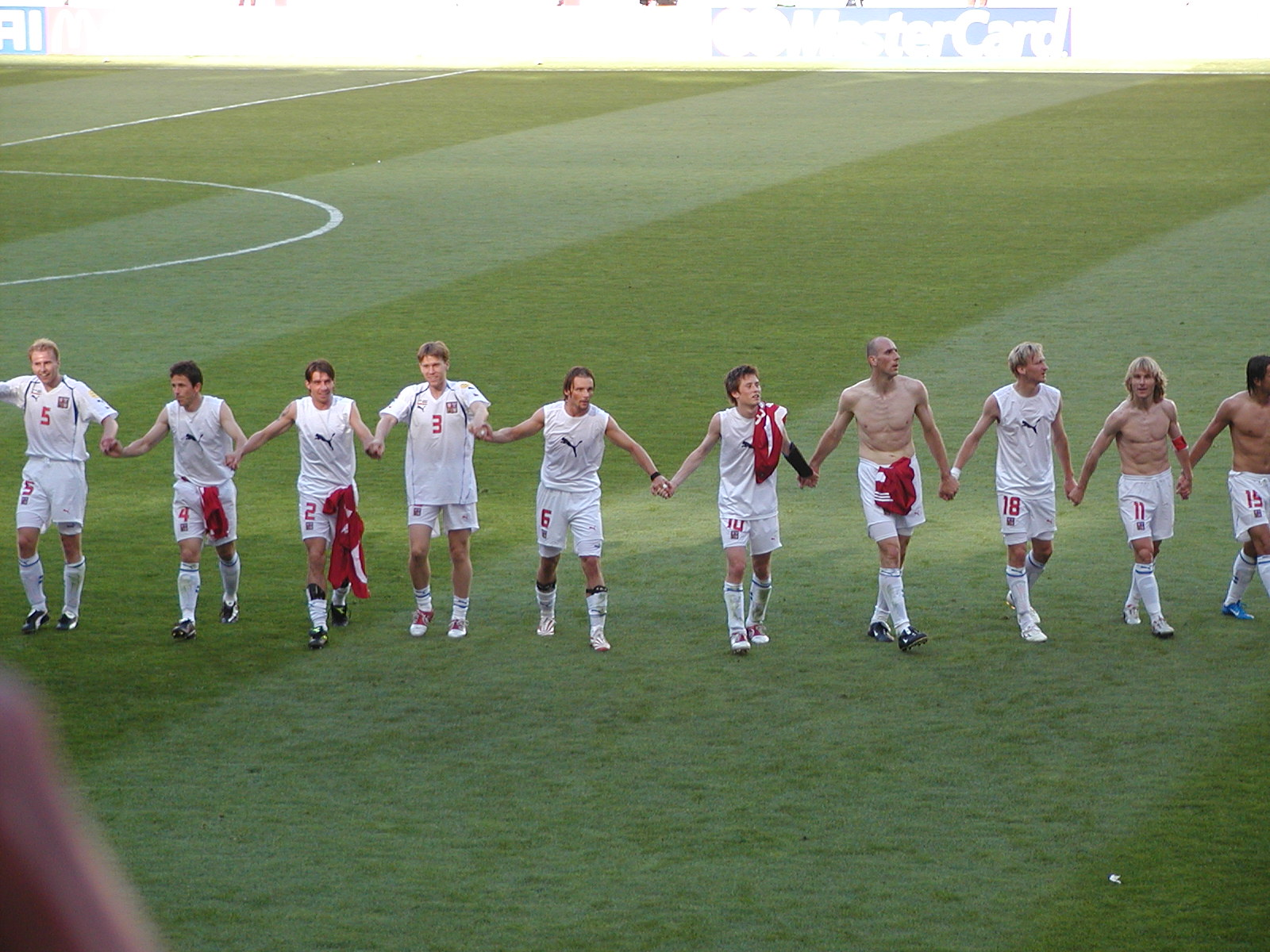
Heinz (18) with the Czech team at Euro 2004

In June 2004 Heinz was one of four forwards selected by Karel Brückner for the Czech Republic squad for Euro 2004. At UEFA Euro 2004 held in Portugal the Czech Republic were drawn into Group D with Germany, the Netherlands and Latvia. In the first match, on 15 June against Latvia, the Czech Republic went into half time trailing by a single goal. Heinz, a second-half substitute for Zdeněk Grygera, scored the winning goal in the 85th minute after Milan Baroš had equalised twelve minutes prior. The game finished 2–1. The second match took place in Aveiro against the Netherlands. With the Netherlands taking a 2–0 lead early in the game, Heinz remained on the bench before making an appearance as a second-half substitute. The Czechs turned the game around with three goals in response to celebrate a 3–2 win. In the last group match against Germany, Czech head coach Karel Brückner made nine changes to his starting lineup. After Germany had opened the scoring, Heinz was felled by German opponent Philipp Lahm. He scored from the resultant direct free kick to level the scores. The Czech Republic went on to win the match 2–1, which was their eighth consecutive competitive victory.

The quarter final against Denmark was held on 27 June 2004. After a goalless first half, Jan Koller opened the scoring and Milan Baroš quickly scored two more goals. Heinz appeared as a second-half substitute for Baroš as the game finished in a 3–0 win. Heinz was an unused substitute in the semi final against Greece, which resulted in a Greece win decided by a silver goal, concluding Heinz's participation in the tournament.

==== 2006 World Cup ====
At the 2006 FIFA World Cup in Germany, the Czech Republic were placed into Group E alongside the USA, Ghana and Italy. Heinz did not play in the first two matches, a 3–0 win against the United States and a 2–0 loss to Ghana. He took part in the final group stage match against Italy; with the Czech team reduced to 10 players after Jan Polák's dismissal, Heinz came on as a second-half substitute for Radoslav Kováč in another 2–0 loss, which eliminated the Czech side from the World Cup.

Heinz's next match after the World Cup was a friendly game in Prague against Denmark in November 2006. He played the whole of the second half as a substitute for David Jarolím, with the match finishing 1–1.

== Playing style ==
Sports advisor at Saint Etienne Claude Robin described Heinz as "a superb technician who delivers excellent passes". He was also known for scoring goals from direct free kicks.

== Coaching career ==
Heinz worked with coaching Sigma Olomouc youth teams until July 2019, when he switched focus to training individual attacking players and being the head coach of the FK Šternberk youth team. As assistant coach of the Šternberk senior side, he was expelled from a Czech Fourth Division match against FC Vsetín in April 2025 after verbally abusing the referee among some controversial decisions. In June 2025, Heinz was appointed assistant coach at Sigma Olomouc B.

== Personal life ==
Heinz was born on 4 August 1977 to parents who both worked in collective farming. He grew up with his mother Agáta and two older sisters. He has two daughters with his former wife, Denisa.

== Career statistics ==
=== Club ===
Appearances and goals by club, season and competition
| Club | Season | League | | | National cup (Note: Includes Czech Cup, DFB-Pokal, Turkish Cup, Coupe de France, Austrian Cup.) | | League cup (Note: Includes Coupe de la Ligue.) | | Continental | | Total | |
| Club | Season | Division | Apps | Goals | Apps | Goals | Apps | Goals | Apps | Goals | Apps | Goals |
|---|---|---|---|---|---|---|---|---|---|---|---|---|
| Lázně Bohdaneč | 1996–97 | Czech 2. Liga | 8 | 0 | | | – | | | | | |
| Sigma Olomouc | 1996–97 | Czech First League | 4 | 0 | | | – | | | | | |
| Sigma Olomouc | 1997–98 | Czech First League | 23 | 4 | | | – | | | | | |
| Sigma Olomouc | 1998–99 | Czech First League | 28 | 9 | | | – | | | | | |
| Sigma Olomouc | 1999–2000 | Czech First League | 15 | 4 | | | – | | | | | |
| Sigma Olomouc | Total | | 70 | 17 | | | 0 | 0 | | | | |
| Hamburger SV | 2000–01 | Bundesliga | 26 | 4 | 2 | 1 | 1 | 0 | 2 | 0 | 31 | 5 |
| Hamburger SV | 2001–02 | Bundesliga | 15 | 1 | 1 | 0 | – | | – | | 16 | 1 |
| Hamburger SV | 2002–03 | Bundesliga | 11 | 0 | 1 | 0 | – | | – | | 12 | 0 |
| Hamburger SV | Total | | 52 | 5 | 4 | 1 | 1 | 0 | 2 | 0 | 59 | 6 |
| Arminia Bielefeld | 2002–03 | Bundesliga | 14 | 0 | 0 | 0 | – | | – | | 14 | 0 |
| Baník Ostrava | 2003–04 | Czech First League | 30 | 19 | | | – | | | | | |
| Baník Ostrava | 2004–05 | Czech First League | 2 | 0 | | | – | | | | | |
| Baník Ostrava | Total | | 32 | 19 | | | 0 | 0 | | | | |
| Borussia Mönchengladbach | 2004–05 | Bundesliga | 20 | 1 | 0 | 0 | – | | – | | 20 | 1 |
| Borussia Mönchengladbach | 2005–06 | Bundesliga | 3 | 0 | 1 | 1 | – | | – | | 4 | 1 |
| Borussia Mönchengladbach | Total | | 23 | 1 | 1 | 1 | 0 | 0 | 0 | 0 | 24 | 2 |
| Galatasaray | 2005–06 | Süper Lig | 18 | 3 | | | | | | | | |
| Saint-Étienne | 2006–07 | Ligue 1 | 28 | 4 | | | | | | | | |
| Nantes | 2007–08 | Ligue 2 | 16 | 1 | | | | | | | | |
| 1. FC Brno | 2008–09 | Czech First League | 21 | 2 | | | – | | | | | |
| Kapfenberger SV | 2009–10 | Austrian Bundesliga | 27 | 5 | | | – | | | | | |
| Ferencváros | 2010–11 | Nemzeti Bajnokság I | 25 | 7 | | | – | | | | | |
| Sigma Olomouc | 2011–12 | Czech First League | 20 | 4 | | | – | | | | | |
| Sigma Olomouc | 2012–13 | Czech First League | 1 | 0 | | | – | | | | | |
| Sigma Olomouc | Total | | 21 | 4 | | | | | | | | |
| 1. SC Znojmo | 2012–13 | Czech 2. Liga | 12 | 8 | | | – | | | | | |
| 1. SC Znojmo | 2013–14 | Czech First League | 8 | 2 | | | – | | | | | |
| 1. SC Znojmo | Total | | 20 | 10 | | | | | | | | |
| Career total | | | 375 | 78 | | | | | | | | |

=== International ===
Appearances and goals by national team and year
| National team | Year | Apps | Goals |
|---|---|---|---|
| Czech Republic | 2000 | 1 | 0 |
| Czech Republic | 2001 | 1 | 0 |
| Czech Republic | 2002 | 0 | 0 |
| Czech Republic | 2003 | 2 | 1 |
| Czech Republic | 2004 | 14 | 2 |
| Czech Republic | 2005 | 7 | 2 |
| Czech Republic | 2006 | 5 | 0 |
| Total | | 30 | 5 |

Scores and results list Czech Republic's goal tally first, score column indicates score after each Heinz goal.

List of international goals scored by Marek Heinz
| No. | Date | Venue | Cap | Opponent | Score | Result | Competition |
|---|---|---|---|---|---|---|---|
| 1 | 15 November 2003 | Na Stínadlech, Teplice, Czech Republic | 4 | Canada | 2–0 | 5–1 | Friendly |
| 2 | 15 June 2004 | Estádio Municipal de Aveiro, Aveiro, Portugal | 10 | Latvia | 2–1 | 2–1 | UEFA Euro 2004 |
| 3 | 23 June 2004 | Estádio José Alvalade, Lisbon, Portugal | 12 | Germany | 1–1 | 2–1 | UEFA Euro 2004 |
| 4 | 7 September 2005 | Andrův stadion, Olomouc, Czech Republic | 22 | Armenia | 1–0 | 4–1 | 2006 FIFA World Cup qualification |
| 5 | 12 October 2005 | Helsinki Olympic Stadium, Helsinki, Finland | 24 | Finland | 3–0 | 3–0 | 2006 FIFA World Cup qualification |

== Honours ==
Baník Ostrava

- Czech First League: 2003–04

Galatasaray

- Süper Lig: 2005–06

Znojmo

- Czech 2. Liga: 2012–13

Individual

- Czech First League top scorer: 2003–04
