= Joseph Hofmann =

Joseph Hofmann or Josef Hofmann (the surname spelled with a single f) may refer to:

- Josef Hofmann (1876–1957), Polish-American pianist and composer
- Josef Anton Hofmann (1924–2010), London-born American loudspeaker designer, son of Josef Hofmann
- Joseph Ehrenfried Hofmann (1900–1973), German historian of mathematics

== See also ==
- Joseph Hoffmann (disambiguation), the surname spelled with a double f
- Joseph Hoffman (1909–1997), American screenwriter
- Joseph F. Hoffman (1925–2022), American scientist
