= Boris Kočí =

Czech footballer

Personal information
- Date of birth: 9 October 1964 (age 62)
- Place of birth: Příbram, Czechoslovakia
- Position: Midfielder

Youth career
- 1978–1983: UD Příbram

Senior career*
Years	Team	Apps	(Gls)
1983–1985	UD Příbram		
1985–1987	Sparta Prague	17	(1)
1988–1990	DP Xaverov Praha 9		
1990–1992	FC Bohemians Prague	52	(4)
1993–1995	Slovan Liberec	59	(2)
1995–1996	FC Příbram	13	(0)

Managerial career
- 2007: FK Baník Sokolov
- 2009–2011: Baník Ostrava (assistant)
- 2011: Vlašim
- 2011–: FK Mladá Boleslav (assistant)
- * Club domestic league appearances and goals

Boris Kočí (born 9 October 1964) is a Czech football manager and former player who works as assistant manager for Mladá Boleslav. A midfielder, he played over 50 matches in the Czech First League between its inception in 1993 and 1996.

== Career ==
Kočí was appointed manager of Czech National Football League side Vlašim in January 2011. The club was in second place at the time of his appointment, but finished seventh in the 2010–11 Czech 2. Liga. In June 2011, he was appointed assistant manager to Miroslav Koubek at Mladá Boleslav.
