= Jan Jeřábek =

Jan Jeřábek may refer to

- Jan Jeřábek (footballer born 1984), Czech footballer
- Jan Jeřábek (footballer born 1992), Czech footballer
