= Václav Vašíček =

Czech footballer

Personal information
- Date of birth: 10 February 1991 (age 35)
- Place of birth: Šumperk, Czech Republic
- Height: 1.87 m (6 ft 1 1/2 in)
- Position: Forward

Team information
- Current team: SU Grabern
- Number: 19

Senior career*
Years	Team	Apps	(Gls)
2009–2019	Sigma Olomouc	50	(15)
2011–2012	→ 1. SC Znojmo (loan)	50	(20)
2013	→ Vysočina Jihlava (loan)	2	(0)
2013–2014	→ 1. SC Znojmo (loan)	25	(10)
2016	→ Dukla Prague (loan)	8	(0)
2018	→ 1. SC Znojmo (loan)	13	(1)
2018	→ Baník Sokolov (loan)	8	(0)
2019	Frýdek-Místek	15	(7)
2019–2022	SK Wullersdorf		
2023–	SV Großkrut	0	(0)

International career
2006–2007	Czech Republic U16	8	(3)
2007	Czech Republic U17	5	(3)
2008–2009	Czech Republic U18	12	(2)
2009–2010	Czech Republic U19	2	(0)
- * Club domestic league appearances and goals as of 20:42, 9 March 2023 (UTC)

Václav Vašíček (born 10 February 1991) is a Czech footballer. He plays as a striker, currently for SV Großkrut.

== Career ==
After being Znojmo's top scorer in the 2011–12 Czech 2. Liga, Vašíček re-signed on loan at Znojmo for another six months in August 2012. He joined Dukla on a half-season loan during the winter break of the 2015–16 season.

In the beginning of 2019, Vašíček joined MFK Frýdek-Místek. A half year later, he moved to Austrian club SK Wullersdorf. Since July 2024 he plays for the Austrian club SU Grabern

== Career statistics ==
As of 30 June 2012.

Club	Season	League		Cup		Total	
Club	Season	Apps	Goals	Apps	Goals	Apps	Goals
Olomouc	2009–10	2	0	0	0	2	0
Olomouc	2010–11	8	1	0	0	8	1
Znojmo	2011–12	27	10	0	0	27	10
Career total		37	11	0	0	37	11
