= David Langer =

David Langer may refer to:

- David Langer (neurosurgeon), neurosurgeon at Lenox Hill Hospital
- David Langer (footballer) (born 1976), Czech footballer
