= Rostislav Kiša =

Czech footballer

Personal information
- Date of birth: 24 December 1978 (age 47)
- Place of birth: Moravská Ostrava, Czechoslovakia
- Height: 1.81 m (5 ft 11 1/2 in)
- Position: Midfielder

Youth career
- 1986–1996: FC Baník Ostrava

Senior career*
Years	Team	Apps	(Gls)
1996–2004	FC Baník Ostrava	41	(1)
2004–2005	SFC Opava (loan)	25	(2)
2005–2006	FK Jablonec	11	(2)
2006–2011	SFC Opava	45	(2)
2011–2012	SV BW Neustadt		
2012–2013	FK Nový Jičín		
2013–2014	SC Pustá Polom		
2014–2015	TJ Háj ve Slezsku		
- * Club domestic league appearances and goals as of 12 January 2021

Rostislav Kiša (born 24 December 1978) is a Czech football player.

Kiša started his football career at Baník Ostrava and played for this club until the age of 26. He was a member of the squad of Baník Ostrava in the 2003-2004 season, when Baník won the league title.
