= Jiří Mlika =

Czech footballer

Personal information
- Date of birth: 18 July 1980 (age 46)
- Place of birth: Kutná Hora, Czechoslovakia
- Height: 1.85 m (6 ft 1 in)
- Position: Forward

Senior career*
Years	Team	Apps	(Gls)
2004–2005	Příbram	15	(2)
2005–2006	Pardubice		
2006–2008	Sokolov		
2008–2010	Plzeň	26	(3)
2010–2012	Sokolov	54	(23)
2012	→ Most (loan)	13	(6)
- * Club domestic league appearances and goals

Jiří Mlika (born 18 July 1980) is a Czech former professional football player. A forward, he played in the Czech First League for Příbram and Plzeň. He played in the second league for Pardubice, Sokolov, and Most. He was the top scorer of the 2011–12 Czech 2. Liga.

== Career ==
Mlika started his career with Příbram, playing 15 times in the Czech First League between 2004 and 2005. He scored his first league goal against Mladá Boleslav in a 2–1 win in October 2004, hitting the ball into an empty net after receiving a pass from Alexandre Mendy. He joined second league side Pardubice in September 2005, scoring a hat-trick within 26 minutes in a November league match against Drnovice. Mlika subsequently joined Sokolov in the same division. After scoring 6 goals in the 2007–08 season, Mlika transferred to First League side Plzeň, signing a three-year contract. Mlika scored his first league goal for Plzeň as a substitute in a game against Bohemians; his second league goal for the club came in similar circumstances away against Brno. His third and final league goal for the club came in February 2009: Mlika scored a goal against Slavia Prague with a close-range shot with Plzeň trailing 3–0; the match ultimately finished 3–2 to Slavia.

Mlika returned to Sokolov at the start of 2010, scoring 10 goals in mid-season friendly matches. During the 2011–12 Czech 2. Liga Mlika scored seven goals for Sokolov in the first part of the season. After a dispute with Sokolov manager Radoslav Látal, Mlika moved to Most in the winter break, scoring a further six goals in the second half of the season to become the league's top scorer.
