= Jiří Kulhánek (footballer) =

Czech footballer

Personal information
- Full name: Jiří Kulhánek
- Date of birth: 8 March 1996 (age 30)
- Place of birth: Prague, Czech Republic
- Height: 1.84 m (6 ft 0 in)
- Position: Defensive midfielder

Team information
- Current team: Sellier & Bellot Vlašim
- Number: 28

Youth career
- Sparta Prague

Senior career*
Years	Team	Apps	(Gls)
2016–2022	Sparta Prague	16	(0)
2016–2017	→ Sellier & Bellot Vlašim (loan)	37	(0)
2017	→ Slovan Liberec (loan)	11	(0)
2018–2019	→ Spartak Trnava (loan)	10	(0)
2019–2020	→ České Budějovice (loan)	15	(0)
2020	→ Mladá Boleslav (loan)	5	(0)
2021	→ Opava (loan)	16	(0)
2021–2022	→ Dukla Prague (loan)	29	(0)
2022–	Sellier & Bellot Vlašim	80	(0)

International career
2011	Czech Republic U16	2	(0)
2013–2014	Czech Republic U18	19	(0)
2014–2015	Czech Republic U19	12	(0)
2015–2017	Czech Republic U20	10	(0)
2017–2018	Czech Republic U21	11	(0)
- * Club domestic league appearances and goals as of 28 May 2026

Jiří Kulhánek (born 8 March 1996) is a Czech footballer who plays for Sellier & Bellot Vlašim as a defensive midfielder.

== Club career ==
=== Slovan Liberec ===
Kulhánek made his professional debut for Slovan Liberec against Fastav Zlín on 30 July 2017.

== Controversy ==
On 23 May 2024, Kulhánek was banned by Disciplinary commission FAČR for eight matches for racist insult in the second league home loss against SK Líšeň 4–5. The club and Kulhánek appealed his ban, denying the allegations.

== Honours ==
Spartak Trnava

- Slovnaft Cup: 2018–19
