= Jakub Blažek =

Czech footballer (born 1989)

Personal information
- Date of birth: 20 August 1989 (age 37)
- Place of birth: Plzeň, Czechoslovakia
- Height: 1.83 m (6 ft 0 in)
- Position: Defender

Team information
- Current team: Senco Doubravka
- Number: 11

Youth career
- 1995–2005: Baník Sokolov
- 2003–2004: → Kalovy Vary (loan)
- 2005–2006: Chmel Blšany
- 2006–2009: Viktoria Plzeň

Senior career*
| Years | Team | Apps | (Gls) |
| 2010–2017 | Sokolov | 114 | (3) |
| 2013–2014 | → Kalovy Vary (loan) | 1 | (1) |
| 2016–2017 | → Jiskra Domažlice (loan) | | |
| 2017–2018 | Jiskra Domažlice | 32 | (2) |
| 2018–2019 | Tachov | | |
| 2019 | Mariánské Lázně | | |
| 2019–2021 | Králův Dvůr | 21 | (0) |
| 2021 | Mariánské Lázně | | |
| 2021–2022 | Králův Dvůr | 0 | (0) |
| 2022–2023 | Union Diersbach | 0 | (0) |
| 2023– | Senco Doubravka | 0 | (0) |
- * Club domestic league appearances and goals as of 21:49, 12 December 2019 (UTC)

Jakub Blažek (born 20 August 1989 in Plzeň) is a professional Czech football player who currently plays for Senco Doubravka.

== Career ==
=== Football ===
Blažek played in his youth for FK Baník Sokolov, SK Buldoci Kalovy Vary (on loan from Banik Sokolov), FK Chmel Blšany, FC Viktoria Plzeň and 1. FC Karlovy Vary.

In the summer 2021, Blažek returned to Baník Sokolov.

=== Futsal ===
He played since 2008 futsal in the summer and winter break for SK INDOSS Plzeň.
