= 2003–04 Czech First League =

11th season of top-tier football league in Czech Republic

Czech First League
- Season: 2003–04
- Champions: Baník Ostrava
- Relegated: Viktoria Žižkov; Viktoria Plzeň
- Champions League: Baník Ostrava; Sparta Prague
- UEFA Cup: Olomouc; Slavia Prague
- Intertoto Cup: Liberec; Zlín; Teplice
- Matches: 240
- Goals: 578 (2.41 per match)
- Top goalscorer: Marek Heinz (19)
- Biggest home win: Sparta Prague 4–0 Opava; Synot 4–0 Žižkov; Ostrava 4–0 Opava; Opava 4–0 Brno; Brno 4–0 Plzeň; Ostrava 6–2 Synot; Ostrava 5–1 Brno
- Biggest away win: Blšany 0–4 Sparta Prague; Plzeň 0–4 Příbram
- Highest scoring: Ostrava 6–2 Synot
- Highest attendance: 20,032; Sparta Prague 1–1 Ostrava
- Lowest attendance: 51; Blšany 3–1 Jablonec
- Average attendance: 4,827

The 2003–04 Czech First League, known as the Gambrinus liga for sponsorship reasons, was the eleventh season of top-tier football in the Czech Republic.

== Stadia and locations ==
Location of clubs in the 2003–04 Czech First League

== League table ==
Pos	Team	Pld	W	D	L	GF	GA	GD	Pts	Qualification or relegation
1	Baník Ostrava (C)	30	18	9	3	60	25	+35	63	Qualification for Champions League third qualifying round
2	Sparta Prague	30	16	10	4	48	24	+24	58	Qualification for Champions League second qualifying round
3	Sigma Olomouc	30	16	7	7	43	24	+19	55	Qualification for UEFA Cup second qualifying round (Note: Since the finalists of the 2003–04 Czech Cup, Baník Ostrava and Sparta Prague, were qualified for Champions League based on league position, the spot awarded to the cup winners was passed to the third-placed team, and the spot awarded to the third-placed team was passed to the fourth-placed team.)
4	Slavia Prague	30	15	7	8	43	24	+19	52	Qualification for UEFA Cup second qualifying round
5	Synot	30	14	6	10	43	37	+6	48	
6	Slovan Liberec	30	12	10	8	38	27	+11	46	Qualification for Intertoto Cup second round
7	Tescoma Zlín	30	12	5	13	31	39	−8	41	Qualification for Intertoto Cup first round
8	České Budějovice	30	11	7	12	38	38	0	40	
9	Teplice	30	9	12	9	32	32	0	39	Qualification for Intertoto Cup first round
10	Jablonec	30	8	14	8	27	32	−5	38	
11	Marila Příbram	30	10	7	13	33	37	−4	37	
12	Opava	30	8	7	15	34	55	−21	31	
13	Blšany	30	8	6	16	34	54	−20	30	
14	Brno	30	7	9	14	33	43	−10	30	
15	Viktoria Žižkov (R)	30	6	9	15	18	34	−16	27	Relegation to Czech 2. Liga
16	Viktoria Plzeň (R)	30	4	7	19	23	53	−30	19	Relegation to Czech 2. Liga

Source: Fortuna liga
Rules for classification: 1) points; 2) head-to-head points; 3) head-to-head goal difference; 4) head-to-head goals scored; 5) goal difference; 6) number of goals scored.
(C) Champions; (R) Relegated

== Results ==
Home \ Away	OST	BLŠ	BRN	ČBU	JAB	PŘÍ	OPA	OLO	SLA	LIB	SPA	SSM	TEP	ZLÍ	PLZ	VŽI
Baník Ostrava		5–2	5–1	3–1	0–0	3–1	4–0	2–1	0–2	1–1	1–2	6–2	1–0	3–0	2–0	0–0
Blšany	2–1		2–1	2–2	3–1	1–0	4–3	2–2	0–2	0–2	0–4	1–3	2–2	1–0	1–2	1–0
Brno	0–0	1–1		0–1	1–1	1–1	2–0	1–2	2–2	2–0	0–0	3–1	2–1	1–2	4–0	2–1
České Budějovice	1–1	1–1	0–2		3–0	0–0	4–1	2–1	0–1	2–1	2–2	2–2	1–1	3–0	1–0	2–0
Jablonec	1–1	2–1	1–0	3–2		0–2	2–0	0–2	0–0	0–0	4–2	1–0	2–0	2–1	1–1	1–1
Marila Příbram	0–3	1–2	2–1	0–2	4–1		2–2	1–1	1–0	2–0	0–0	1–0	1–0	2–4	2–1	1–1
Opava	2–4	2–1	4–0	1–0	1–1	3–2		1–2	0–0	1–3	3–4	1–0	0–0	2–0	2–0	1–1
Sigma Olomouc	0–1	3–0	3–1	1–0	0–0	1–0	3–0		2–0	2–0	1–1	1–0	1–3	2–0	1–0	3–0
Slavia Prague	1–2	2–0	4–1	0–1	0–0	3–0	4–1	3–1		1–2	0–2	2–0	2–2	2–0	3–0	2–0
Slovan Liberec	0–2	1–0	0–0	2–1	0–0	4–1	3–1	1–1	0–1		2–0	3–3	1–1	3–0	3–1	3–0
Sparta Prague	1–1	1–0	1–0	3–0	2–1	0–0	4–0	0–0	0–0	0–0		3–1	3–0	3–1	3–1	3–1
Synot	0–2	1–0	0–0	3–0	1–0	1–0	3–1	3–2	4–2	2–1	2–0		2–0	0–0	2–2	4–0
Teplice	1–1	2–2	2–1	2–0	1–1	1–0	2–0	0–0	0–1	2–1	1–1	1–1		3–0	2–1	1–1
Tescoma Zlín	1–1	3–1	3–2	2–0	2–0	0–2	0–0	1–0	1–2	0–0	1–0	2–0	1–0		3–1	3–0
Viktoria Plzeň	1–2	2–1	1–1	2–4	1–1	0–4	0–1	1–3	2–1	0–0	1–2	0–1	2–0	0–0		0–2
Viktoria Žižkov	1–2	2–2	2–0	1–0	0–0	1–0	0–0	0–1	0–0	0–1	0–1	0–1	0–1	3–0	0–0	

Source: Fortuna liga
Legend: Blue = home team win; Yellow = draw; Red = away team win.

== Squad of the champions Baník Ostrava ==
Goalkeepers

- Michal Daněk, Jan Laštůvka, Martin Raška

Defenders

- Pavel Besta, René Bolf, Peter Drozd, Josef Dvorník, Josef Hoffmann, Aleš Neuwirth, Zdeněk Pospěch

Midfielders

- David Bystroň, Martin Čížek, Rostislav Kiša, Radoslav Látal, Mario Lička, Miroslav Matušovič, Radek Slončík

Forwards

- Marek Heinz, Přemysl Krpec, Lukáš Magera, Martin Prohászka, Adam Varadi, Libor Žůrek

== Top goalscorers ==
Rank	Player	Club	Goals
1	(Czech Republic) Marek Heinz	Baník Ostrava	19
2	(Slovakia) Lubomír Reiter	Sigma Olomouc	15
3	(Czech Republic) David Lafata	České Budějovice	14
4	(Czech Republic) Milan Pacanda	Brno	12
5	(Czech Republic) Filip Dort	Opava	11
5	(Czech Republic) Karel Poborský	Sparta Prague	11
7	(Czech Republic) Libor Došek	Slovan Liberec	10
7	(Czech Republic) Miroslav Matušovič	Baník Ostrava	10
9	(Czech Republic) Zdeněk Pospěch	Baník Ostrava	9

== Attendances ==
#	Club	Average
1	Baník Ostrava	15,376
2	Sparta Praha	7,707
3	Sigma Olomouc	6,117
4	Slovan Liberec	5,271
5	Brno	4,769
6	Teplice	4,643
7	Opava	4,334
8	Příbram	4,240
9	Synot	4,034
10	Slavia Praha	3,991
11	Viktoria Plzeň	3,622
12	Tescoma Zlín	3,488
13	Česke Budějovice	3,258
14	Jablonec	2,917
15	Viktoria Žižkov	2,197
16	Blšany	1,318

== See also ==
- 2003–04 Czech Cup
- 2003–04 Czech 2. Liga
