= Aleš Neuwirth =

Czech footballer (born 1985)

Personal information
- Date of birth: 4 January 1985 (age 41)
- Place of birth: Ostrava, Czechoslovakia
- Height: 1.92 m (6 ft 3 1/2 in)
- Position: Defender

Youth career
- 1993–2003: FC Baník Ostrava

Senior career*
Years	Team	Apps	(Gls)
2003–2011	FC Baník Ostrava	90	(3)
2004–2005	→ FK Drnovice (loan)	4	(0)
2005–2006	→ SK Kladno (loan)	42	(6)
2011–2012	FC Viktoria Plzeň	6	(0)
2011	→ FK Mladá Boleslav (loan)	0	(0)

International career
2003–2004	Czech Republic U-19	17	(1)
2004	Czech Republic U-21	2	(0)
- * Club domestic league appearances and goals as of 1 July 2011

Aleš Neuwirth (born 4 January 1985) is a Czech former football player.

Neuwirth was a member of the squad of Baník Ostrava in the 2003–2004 season, when Baník won the league title. In 2011, he was transferred from Baník to FC Viktoria Plzeň and won the league title for the second time.

Neuwirth has ninety-four league starts to his credit. At the time of his transfer he was not in the best financial situation which influenced his decision to move.
