= Jan Jeřábek (footballer, born 1992) =

Czech footballer

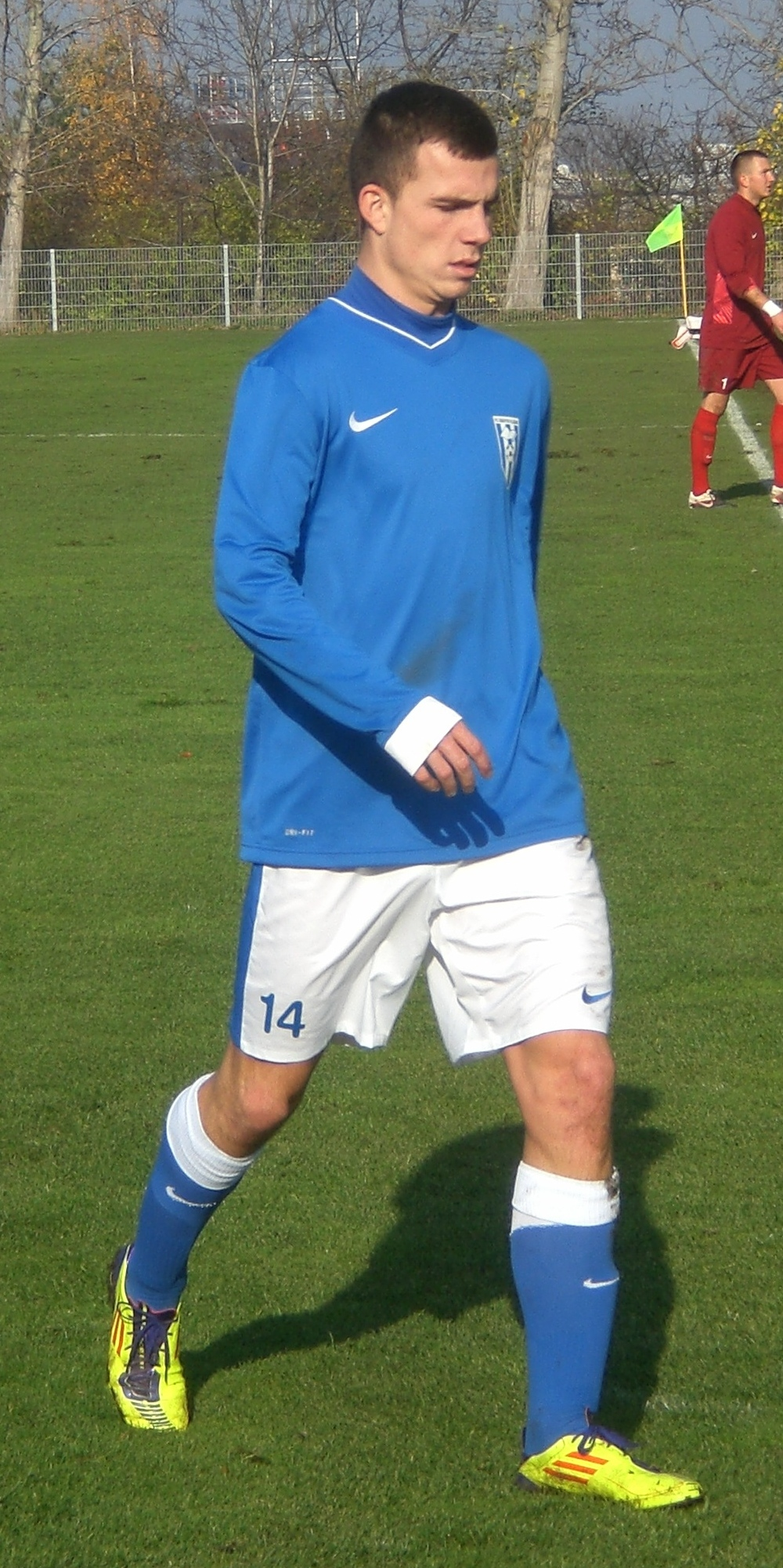

Personal information
- Date of birth: 1 September 1992 (age 34)
- Place of birth: Prague, Czechoslovakia
- Height: 1.67 m (5 ft 5 1/2 in)
- Position: Forward

Team information
- Current team: Vlašim
- Number: 14

Youth career
- 1996–1998: Horní Měcholupy
- 1998–2003: Bohemians 1905
- 2003–2004: Horní Měcholupy
- 2004–2010: AC Sparta Prague

Senior career*
Years	Team	Apps	(Gls)
2010–2012	Sparta Prague B	12	(0)
2012–	Vlašim	37	(5)
- * Club domestic league appearances and goals as of 30 June 2014

Jan Jeřábek (born 1 September 1992) is a Czech football forward currently playing for Vlašim.
