= Adam Varadi =

Czech football player (born 1985)

Personal information
- Full name: Adam Varadi
- Date of birth: 30 April 1985 (age 41)
- Place of birth: Frýdek-Místek, Czechoslovakia
- Height: 1.82 m (5 ft 11 1/2 in)
- Position: Striker

Team information
- Current team: 1. BFK Frýdlant nad Ostravicí
- Number: 14

Youth career
- 1992–1999: VP Frýdek-Místek
- 1999–2003: Baník Ostrava

Senior career*
Years	Team	Apps	(Gls)
2003–2004	Baník Ostrava	15	(0)
2005	→ Viktoria Žižkov (loan)	12	(0)
2005	Teplice (loan)	11	(2)
2006–2008	Baník Ostrava	49	(12)
2008–2009	Viktoria Plzeň	39	(9)
2009–2011	Baník Ostrava	54	(9)
2011–2015	Sigma Olomouc	74	(14)
2012	→ Senica (loan)	14	(2)
2015	Dynamo České Budějovice	10	(2)
2015–2016	Sigma Olomouc II	2	(1)
2016–2017	GKS Tychy	21	(2)
2017	Polonia Bytom	7	(0)
2017–2021	MFK Frýdek-Místek	80	(31)
2021–2022	FC Vratimov	32	(4)
2022–	1. BFK Frýdlant nad Ostravicí	44	(9)

International career
2002–2004	Czech Republic U19	22	(0)
2004–2006	Czech Republic U21	6	(0)
- * Club domestic league appearances and goals as of 08:45, 30 April 2024 (UTC)

Adam Varadi (born 30 April 1985) is a Czech footballer who plays as a striker for 1. BFK Frýdlant nad Ostravicí.

Varadi was a member of the squad of Baník Ostrava in the 2003–04 season, when Baník won the league title. He played for the Czech Republic youth national teams since the under-15 level.

== Honours ==
Baník Ostrava

- Czech First League: 2003–04

Sigma Olomouc

- Czech Cup: 2011–12
