= David Langer (footballer) =

Czech footballer

Personal information
- Date of birth: 27 January 1976 (age 50)
- Place of birth: Rýmařov, Czechoslovakia
- Height: 1.82 m (6 ft 0 in)
- Position: Midfielder

Senior career*
Years	Team	Apps	(Gls)
1997–1999	SK Uničov		
1999–2000	MFK Vítkovice		
2001–2004	FC Slovan Liberec	95	(3)
2005	FK Mladá Boleslav	9	(0)
2005–2006	Panionios		
2006–2007	TJ Tatran Jakubčovice		

Managerial career
- 2020–2021: 1. SC Znojmo FK
- * Club domestic league appearances and goals

David Langer (born 27 January 1976) is a Czech football manager and former player, who played as a midfielder. He started his career with SK Uničov, where he played from 1997 to 1999. Langer played for FC Slovan Liberec in the Czech First League between 2000 and 2004, winning the national title in the 2001–02 season. He joined Mladá Boleslav in January 2005, before signing a two-year contract with Greek side Panionios ahead of the 2005–06 season. He then returned to the Czech Republic, signing for TJ Tatran Jakubčovice of the second league ahead of the 2006–07 season.

He was appointed manager of 1. SC Znojmo FK in the third-tier Moravian-Silesian Football League in November 2020, a position he held until September 2021.
