= Jiří Schubert =

Czech footballer

Personal information
- Date of birth: 18 April 1988 (age 38)
- Place of birth: Mladá Boleslav, Czechoslovakia
- Height: 1.85 m (6 ft 1 in)
- Position: Forward

Senior career*
| Years | Team | Apps | (Gls) |
| 2007–2013 | FK Mladá Boleslav | 2 | (0) |
| 2012–2013 | → FK Varnsdorf (loan) | 27 | (8) |
| 2013–2016 | FK Varnsdorf | 61 | (4) |
| 2016–2017 | FK Dobrovice | | |
- * Club domestic league appearances and goals

Jiří Schubert (born 18 April 1988) is a professional Czech football player.
