= Bohumil Smrček =

Czech football manager

Personal information
- Date of birth: 3 July 1961 (age 65)
- Place of birth: Czech Republic

Managerial career
- Years: Team
- 1998 – 2000: SV Manhartsberg
- 2001–2003: 1. FC Brno
- 2004: SV Horn
- 2005: SC Retz
- 2006–2009: SK Líšeň
- 2010–2012: 1. SC Znojmo FK
- 2012–2016: SK Líšeň
- 2019: 1. SC Znojmo FK
- 2020–: FC Moravský Krumlov

Bohumil Smrček (born 3 July 1961) is a Czech football manager.

Schach und Dachshund und Deutsch
