= David Vaněček (footballer, born 1991) =

Czech footballer

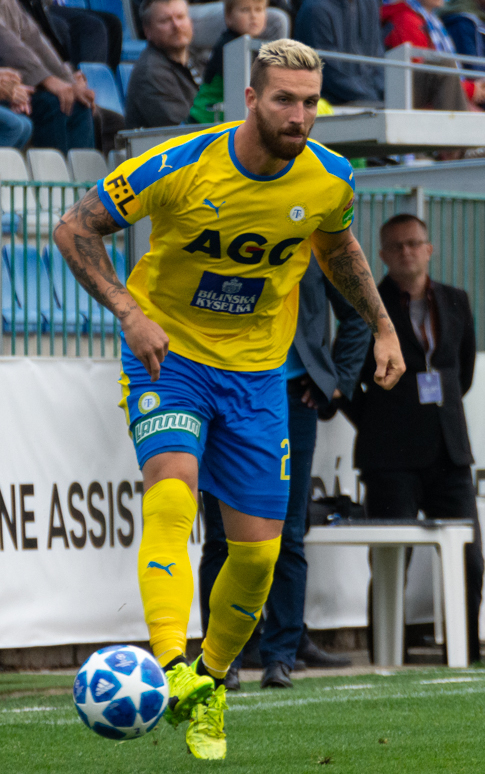

Personal information
- Date of birth: 9 March 1991 (age 35)
- Place of birth: Planá, Czechoslovakia
- Height: 1.93 m (6 ft 4 in)
- Position: Forward

Team information
- Current team: Opava
- Number: 10

Senior career*
Years	Team	Apps	(Gls)
2010–2014	Viktoria Plzeň	4	(0)
2010–2011	→ Sezimovo Ústí (loan)	4	(0)
2011	→ Ústí nad Labem (loan)	11	(2)
2012	→ Vlašim (loan)	12	(3)
2012	→ Sokolov (loan)	16	(6)
2013	→ Jihlava (loan)	6	(0)
2013–2014	→ Hradec Králové (loan)	14	(13)
2014–2016	Hradec Králové	40	(9)
2016–2019	Teplice	76	(24)
2019	Heart of Midlothian	5	(0)
2019–2021	Puskás Akadémia	32	(11)
2021	Diósgyőr	14	(2)
2021–2023	Sigma Olomouc	19	(2)
2023–2024	Opava	17	(2)

International career^{‡}
2007	Czech Republic U16	2	(0)
2008	Czech Republic U18	3	(0)
2010	Czech Republic U19	1	(0)
- * Club domestic league appearances and goals as of 20 June 2024 ‡ National team caps and goals as of 30 June 2015

David Vaněček (born 9 March 1991) is a Czech professional football player who currently plays for FK Motorlet Prague. He previously played for several top-tier Czech club, including Teplice, for which he played the most matches and scored the most goals. He has represented his country at Under-16, Under-18 and Under-19 levels.

== Career ==
=== Early career and loans ===
While registered as a player at Viktoria Plzeň, Vaněček spent time on loan at six clubs over a three-year period between 2010 and 2013.

=== Mid-career ===
Vaněček left Viktoria Plzeň permanently in February 2014, signing a permanent contract with Hradec Králové, tying him to the club until the end of the 2015–16 season. He is the cousin of another David Vaněček; they played together at Sokolov.

Vaněček joined Scottish Premiership side Heart of Midlothian in January 2019, having signed a pre-contract agreement in July 2018. In his second appearance for the club he was described as "rubbish" by manager Craig Levein, and substituted after 34 minutes. Levein later said that Vaněček had apologised to him for his lack of fitness. Vaněček was released the following summer having left Hearts by mutual consent, and two days later signed to Hungarian Nemzeti Bajnokság I team Puskás Akadémia. He went on to play for another Hungarian side, Diósgyőr during 2021.

=== Later career ===
Vaněček returned to the Czech Republic in the summer of 2021, signing a two-year contract with SK Sigma Olomouc. During two years at the club, he played just 275 minutes across 19 league games, mainly due to injury issues with his knee. He left the club after his contract expired at the end of the 2022–23 Czech First League season. Vaněček subsequently signed with SFC Opava in the second-tier Czech National Football League.
