= Josef Hoffmann (footballer) =

Czech footballer (born 1978)

Personal information
- Date of birth: 19 November 1978 (age 47)
- Place of birth: Czechoslovakia
- Height: 1.79 m (5 ft 10 in)
- Position: Defender

Youth career
- 1985–1989: SK Hranice
- 1989–1996: SK Sigma Olomouc

Senior career*
Years	Team	Apps	(Gls)
1996–1997	Dukla Hranice		
1997–2001	FC Baník Ostrava	3	(0)
2001–2002	FK Mladá Boleslav (loan)		
2002–2004	FC Baník Ostrava	27	(0)
2005	FK Viktoria Žižkov (loan)		
2005	SK Kladno (loan)		
2005–2007	FC Baník Ostrava	34	(1)
2007–2008	SK Kladno	8	(0)
2008–2014	MFK Karviná	45	(1)
- * Club domestic league appearances and goals as of 7 June 2011

Josef Hoffmann (born 19 November 1978) is a Czech former football player.

Hoffmann played for several Gambrinus liga clubs, most notably for Baník Ostrava. He was a member of the squad of Baník Ostrava in the 2003–04 season, when Baník won the league title.
