= Miloslav Strnad =

Czech football player (born 1981)

Personal information
- Full name: Miloslav Strnad
- Date of birth: 3 December 1981 (age 44)
- Place of birth: Czechoslovakia
- Height: 1.88 m (6 ft 2 in)
- Position: Striker

Team information
- Current team: FK MAS Táborsko
- Number: 11

Senior career*
Years	Team	Apps	(Gls)
2005–2009	Bohemians 1905	11	(0)
2008	→ FC Zenit Čáslav (loan)	16	(9)
2009–2011	FC Baník Ostrava	20	(3)
2010–2011	→ Vlašim (loan)	23	(12)
2011–	Vlašim	14	(8)
2012	→ FK Baník Sokolov (loan)	13	(4)
- * Club domestic league appearances and goals as of 30 June 2012

Miloslav Strnad (born 3 December 1981) is a Czech football player who currently plays for Táborsko.

Strnad joined Gambrinus liga side FC Baník Ostrava in 2009, signing a two-year contract making it his first spell at a top-flight club. He marked his first league start for the club by scoring in the first minute of a 2–2 draw with FK Teplice.

Strnad signed for Vlašim on a one-year loan deal from Baník Ostrava in the summer of 2010, a year later signing for Vlašim permanently in the summer of 2011. Despite finishing the autumn part of the 2011–12 Czech 2. Liga as top scorer, Strnad headed to Sokolov on a six-month loan deal in January 2012.

== Career statistics ==
As of 30 June 2012.

Club	Season	League		Cup		Total	
Club	Season	Apps	Goals	Apps	Goals	Apps	Goals
Čáslav	2008–09	16	9	0	0	16	9
Bohemians 1905	2008–09	11	0	0	0	11	0
Baník Ostrava	2009–10	20	3	0	0	20	3
Vlašim	2010–11	23	12	0	0	23	12
Vlašim	2011–12	14	8	0	0	14	8
Sokolov	2011–12	13	4	0	0	13	4
Career total		97	36	0	0	97	36
