= Radim Nepožitek =

Czech footballer

Personal information
- Date of birth: 26 June 1988 (age 38)
- Place of birth: Czechoslovakia
- Position: Midfielder

Team information
- Current team: SK Eggenburg

Youth career
- Sigma Olomouc

Senior career*
Years	Team	Apps	(Gls)
2007–2014	Sigma Olomouc	17	(0)
2009–2010	→ SFC Opava (loan)	20	(1)
2010–2011	→ 1. SC Znojmo (loan)	14	(2)
2012–2013	→ 1. SC Znojmo (loan)	25	(9)
2013	→ 1. SC Znojmo (loan)	14	(1)
2015–2017	Sigma Olomouc	56	(5)
2017–2018	SK Eggenburg		
2018–2019	U. Stinkenbrunn		
2022–	SK Náměšť na Hané		
- * Club domestic league appearances and goals as of 19 November 2017

Radim Nepožitek (born 26 June 1988) is a professional Czech football player, who currently plays for SK Eggenburg.

== Honours ==
SK Sigma Olomouc

- Czech Cup: 2011–12
