= David Vaněček (footballer, born 1983) =

Czech footballer

Personal information
- Full name: David Vaněček
- Date of birth: 25 July 1983 (age 43)
- Place of birth: Czechoslovakia
- Height: 1.66 m (5 ft 5 in)
- Position: Midfielder

Team information
- Current team: Viktoria Plzeň B (assistant)

Senior career*
Years	Team	Apps	(Gls)
2003–2007	Viktoria Plzeň	2	(0)
2006–2007	Karlovy Vary (loan)		
2007–2008	Mladá Boleslav	10	(1)
2008–2016	Sokolov	105	(14)

Managerial career
- 2016–2019: Sokolov (assistant)
- 2019: Sokolov
- 2020: Sokolov (U-19)
- 2020–: Viktoria Plzeň B (assistant)
- * Club domestic league appearances and goals as of 31 December 2011

David Vaněček (born 25 July 1983) is a former professional Czech football player and current manager. He is the cousin of another David Vaněček; they played together at Sokolov.
