= Miroslav Matušovič =

Czech footballer

Personal information
- Date of birth: 2 November 1980 (age 45)
- Place of birth: Havířov, Czechoslovakia
- Height: 1.72 m (5 ft 7 1/2 in)
- Position: Midfielder

Team information
- Current team: Hranice (manager)

Youth career
- 1986–1996: Baník Havířov
- 1996–1998: Baník Ostrava

Senior career*
Years	Team	Apps	(Gls)
1998–2005	Banik Ostrava	93	(19)
2005–2009	Sparta Prague	108	(13)
2009–2010	Apollon Limassol	22	(1)
2011	MFK Havířov	13	(7)
2011–2012	Apollon Limassol	9	(1)
2012–2013	MFK Havířov	13	(2)
- * Club domestic league appearances and goals as of 5 March 2020

Miroslav Matušovič (born 2 November 1980) is a former Czech footballer and current manager. He was an attacking midfielder, left winger or second striker, who last played for Apollon Limassol. His strengths were his dangerous left-foot, dribbling skills and pace.

He started his career in Havířov. In 1996 - 2005 he played for FC Baník Ostrava, with whom he won the Czech First League in the 2003/04 season. In January 2005 he signed a contract with Sparta Prague. Matušovič scored a goal in his first UEFA Champions League appearance against Ajax Amsterdam on 28 September 2005. In the summer of 2009 he left Sparta and went to Cyprus to play for Apollon Limassol. In 2011, he signed a short-term contract at boyhood club Havířov, playing in the Czech Fourth Division, but in July of the same year he returned to Limassol on a new contract.

== Honours ==
Baník Ostrava

- Czech First League: 2003–04

Apollon Limassol

- Cypriot Cup: 2009–10
