= David Čada =

Czech footballer

Personal information
- Date of birth: 5 August 1986 (age 40)
- Place of birth: Czechoslovakia
- Height: 1.83 m (6 ft 0 in)
- Position: Midfielder

Team information
- Current team: FK Baník Sokolov
- Number: 15

Youth career
- AS Pardubice
- Union Cheb

Senior career*
Years	Team	Apps	(Gls)
2007–	Sokolov	124	(14)
- * Club domestic league appearances and goals as of 31 December 2011

David Čada (born 5 August 1986) is a professional Czech football player who currently plays for FK Baník Sokolov.
