= Joseph F. Hoffman =

American scientist (1925–2022)

- Born: March 7, 1925; Oklahoma City, Oklahoma, U.S.
- Died: May 19, 2022 (aged 97); North Haven, Connecticut, U.S.
- Education: University of Oklahoma; Princeton University
- Spouses: Marilyn Brachman Hoffman; Elena Citkowitz

Joseph Frederick Hoffman (March 7, 1925 – May 19, 2022) was an American scientist who primary researched the physiology of red blood cells. His research accomplishments were recognized in 1981 when he was elected to the National Academy of Sciences.

== Early life and education ==
Joseph Frederick Hoffman was born in 1925 in Oklahoma City. His mother, Rena Crossman Hoffman, was a college graduate and a school teacher, and his father, Henry R. Hoffman, was a self-taught businessman in cigar manufacturing. He had two brothers, Edmund M. and Henry R. Hoffman.

Hoffman attended the University of Oklahoma, where he majored in zoology for his undergraduate degree. He described a course in cytology as a turning point in his education, as he became fascinated by the cell membrane. He decided to further study the topic by taking a course in cell physiology. Faculty member Francis R. Hunter then invited Hoffman to work in his lab over the summer, researching the permeability of red blood cells. While an undergraduate, he participated in a sit-in for three days and nights over the university's rejection of Ada Lois Sipuel Fisher, a black woman, from its law school on the basis of race. After completing his undergraduate degree, he stayed at the University of Oklahoma for another year to complete a master's degree. Hoffman attended Princeton University for a second master's degree and his doctoral studies, under the advisement of Arthur K. Parpart.

== Career ==
After graduating from Princeton with his PhD, he became a junior faculty member at the biology department at Princeton. He was later hired at the National Heart Institute of the National Institutes of Health. In 1965, he joined the faculty of the Yale School of Medicine in the physiology department. He succeeded Robert M. Berne as the editor of the Annual Review of Physiology in 1989. He remained editor through 2005.

== Personal life ==
In 1958, he married Marilyn Brachman. He was later married to Elena Citkowitz, whom he met around 1973. His pastimes included opera. Hoffman died in North Haven, Connecticut, on May 19, 2022, at the age of 97.

== Awards and honors ==
Hoffman was elected as a member of the National Academy of Sciences in 1981. In 1998, he was awarded the Yale Science and Engineering Association Award for the Advancement of Basic and Applied Science.
