= Pod Vinicí =

Football stadium in Pardubice, Czech Republic

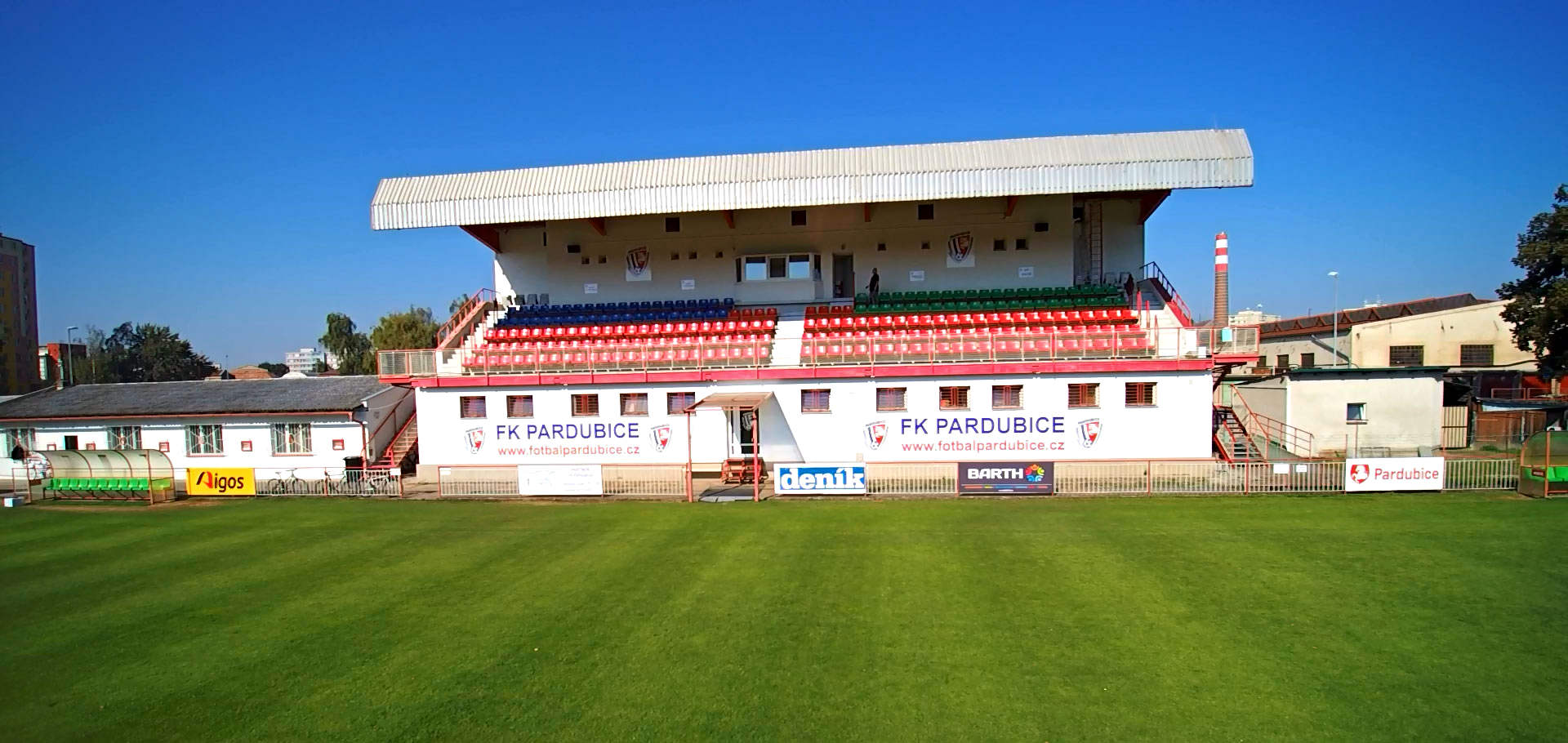
- Interactive map of Pod Vinicí
- Location: K Vinici 1901, Pardubice, Czech Republic, 530 02
- Coordinates: 50°01′47″N 15°46′54″E
- Owner: TJ Tesla Pardubice
- Capacity: 2,500 (600 seated)
- Surface: Grass
- Field size: 105x68 m

Construction
- Opened: 1934
- Renovated: 1988, 2012

Tenants
- FK Pardubice; FK Pardubice (women)

Pod Vinicí is a football stadium in Pardubice, Czech Republic. It is the former home stadium of FK Pardubice. The total capacity is 2,500, including 600 seated.

In 2012 FK Pardubice invested over one million CZK in the redevelopment of the seating in order to meet league requirements as the team was promoted to the Czech 2. Liga. In September 2011 a crowd of around 3,000 watched the third round 2011–12 Czech Cup match against Sparta Prague at the stadium.
