= Městský stadion (Znojmo) =

Multi-purpose stadium in Znojmo, Czech Republic

Městský stadion v Horním parku
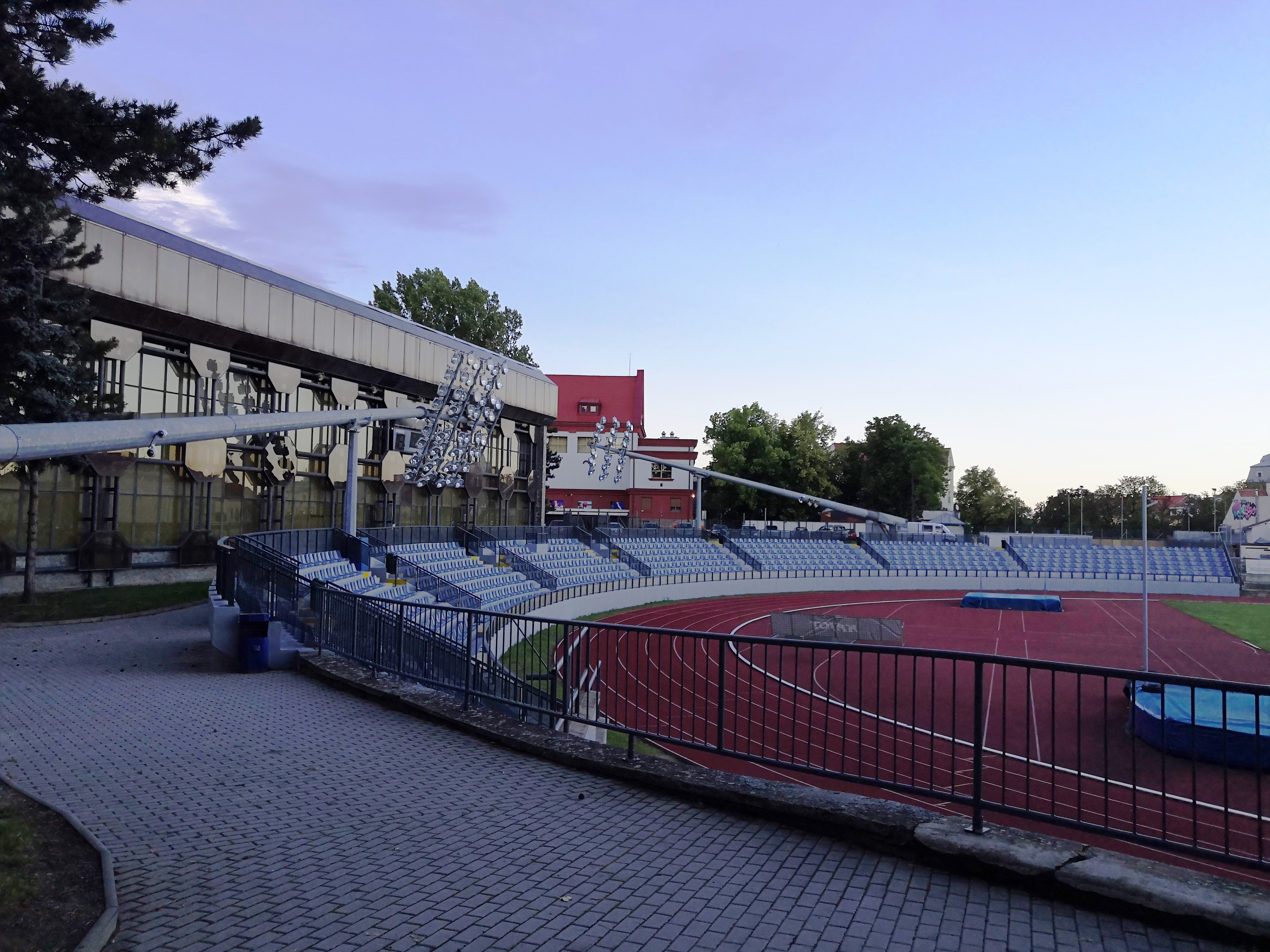
- Interactive map of Městský stadion v Horním parku
- Location: F. J. Curie 957/9, Znojmo, Czech Republic, 669 02
- Coordinates: 48°51′29.92″N 16°3′7.27″E
- Owner: Town of Znojmo
- Capacity: 2,599
- Field size: 105 by 68 metres (115 by 74 yd)

Construction
- Groundbreaking: 1948
- Opened: 1952
- Renovated: 2006, 2014

Tenant
- 1. SC Znojmo

Městský stadion, also known as Městský stadion v Horním parku (formerly known as Stadion v Husových sadech), is a multi-purpose stadium in Znojmo, Czech Republic. It is mainly used for football matches and is the home ground of 1. SC Znojmo FK. The stadium has a capacity of 2 599 people.
