= 1. SC Znojmo FK =

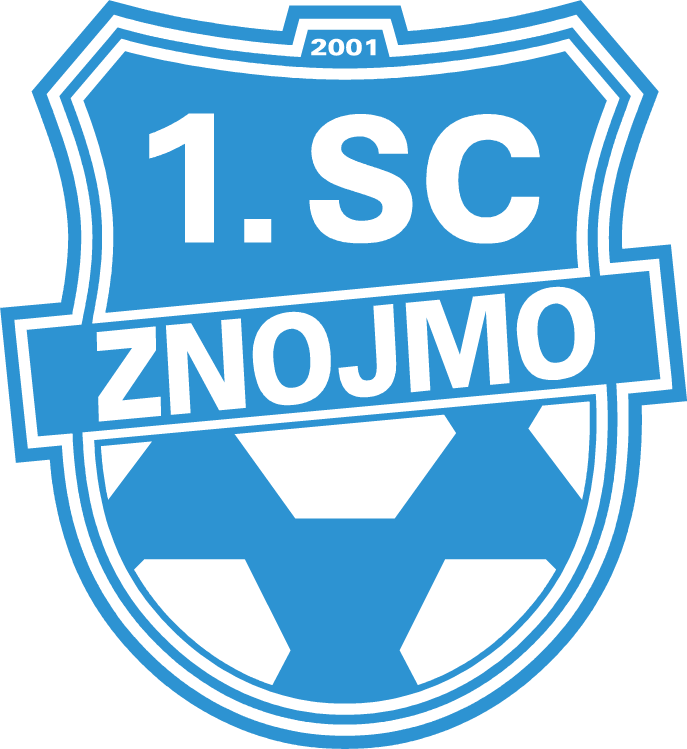
- Full name: 1. Sport Club Znojmo Fotbalový klub a.s.
- Founded: 1953 (as Rudá Hvězda Znojmo); 2001 (after merger with FC Znojmo)
- Ground: Městský stadion
- Capacity: 2,599
- Chairman: František Šturma
- Manager: Milan Valachovič
- League: Czech Fourth Division D
- 2025–26: 5th
- Website: https://www.1scznojmo.cz/
Home colours	Away colours

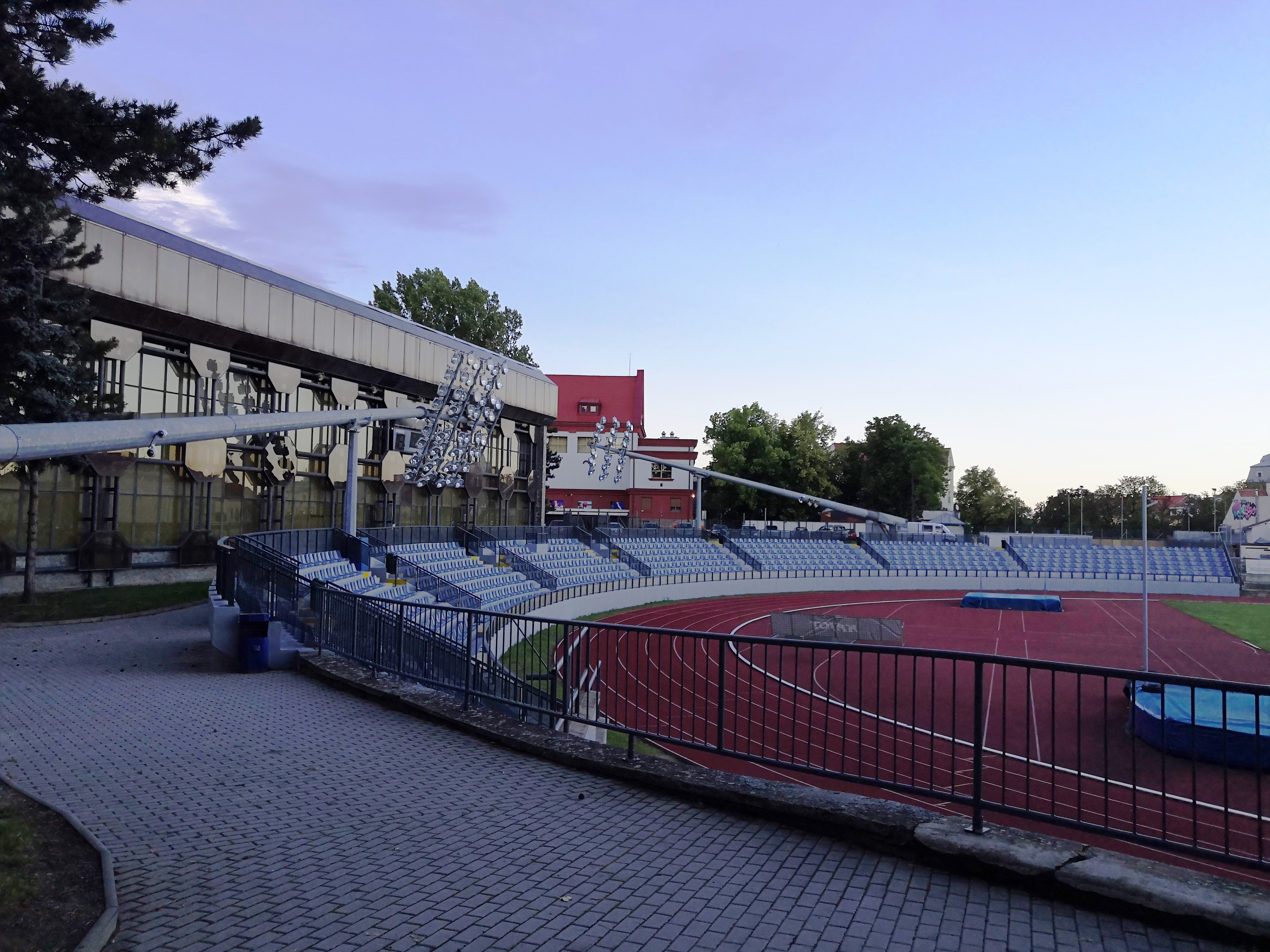
Municipal Stadium in Znojmo

1. SC Znojmo FK is a football club from Znojmo in the Czech Republic. After the 2024–25 season, the club was relegated into the Czech Fourth Division.

== History ==
Znojmo won promotion from the Czech Fourth Division in 2002, finishing first in Division D in the 2001–02 season. The club followed this with eight seasons in the Moravian–Silesian Football League, before winning another promotion in 2010 under manager Michal Sobota. The club secured promotion to the Czech 2. Liga two matches before the end of 2009–10 season. Znojmo replaced Sobota in the summer of 2010, partly due to him not having a coaching license for professional football. His replacement was Bohumil Smrček.

Two relatively unsuccessful seasons followed under Smrček, with the club finishing 14th and 13th respectively. This prompted the club to replace Smrček with new manager Leoš Kalvoda. Kalvoda went on to lead the club to a first-place finish in the 2012–13 Czech 2. Liga and Znojmo celebrated promotion from the Czech 2. Liga, winning the right to play in the top flight for the first time in their history. They finished bottom of the 2013–14 Czech First League, and played all of their matches in Brno (aside from one which was played in Jihlava) due to their own stadium not meeting league requirements.

Znjomo were scheduled to participate in the preliminary round of the 2024–25 Czech Cup but withdrew before their match with TJ Sokol Tasovice.

=== Historical names ===
- 1953 – DSO Rudá Hvězda Znojmo
- 1969 – TJ Rudá Hvězda Znojmo
- 1990 – SKP Znojmo-Práče (after incorporation of TJ Sokol Práče)
- 1992 – SKPP Znojmo
- 1993 – VTJ SKP Znojmo
- 1994 – VTJ Znojmo-Rapotice (after incorporation of TJ Sokol Rapotice, 1997 Sokol Rapotice split again)
- 1995 – VTJ Znojmo
- 1999 – Fotbal Znojmo
- 2001 – 1. SC Znojmo FK (after incorporation of FC Znojmo)

== Stadium ==
Znojmo's home stadium is Městský stadion. In the 2013–14 season, when Znojmo played in the Czech First League, the team played league matches at Brno's Městský fotbalový stadion Srbská, because the Znojmo's stadium did not meet the standards required for the Czech First League.

== Players ==
=== Current squad ===
As of 27 October 2025

Note: Flags indicate national team as defined under FIFA eligibility rules; some limited exceptions apply. Players may hold more than one non-FIFA nationality.

No.	Pos.	Nation	Player
1	GK	CZE	Jiří Koukal
2	DF	CZE	Martin Frolek (on loan from Zlín B)
3	DF	CZE	Michal Suchý
4	DF	CZE	Eduard Hospodar
5	MF	UKR	Zhan Matitsiv
6	DF	CZE	Tomáš Drozd
7	MF	UKR	Pavlo Ostrovka
8	MF	FRA	Mohamed-Lamine Diakité
9	MF	SRB	Amar Brunčević
10	MF	UKR	Artem Tarasenko
11	MF	CZE	Daniel Frébort

No.	Pos.	Nation	Player
14	MF	UKR	Oleksandr Shelkovenko
15	DF	GEO	Zaur Kereleishvili
17	MF	UKR	Oleh Dyshuk
18	DF	GHA	Emmanuel Maaboah
19	FW	NGR	Peter Desmond Chiemela
20	DF	GHA	Stephen Badu Dankwah
21	MF	CZE	Dmytro Pavlovyč Džupenjuk
22	MF	FRA	Moctar Diakité
30	GK	CZE	Marek Kalina (on loan from Uničov)
99	FW	UKR	Yehor Syniak
—	FW	COL	William Mackleyther

=== Notable former players ===
- (Czech Republic) Robert Caha
- (Czech Republic) Patrik Siegl
- (Czech Republic) Libor Sionko
- (Czech Republic) Michal Špit

== Managers ==
- Jiří Fryš (1988–92)
- Josef Čech (1993)
- Jiří Fryš (1993–98)
- Michal Sobota (2006–10)
- Bohumil Smrček (2010–12)
- Leoš Kalvoda (2012–14)
- Oldřich Machala (2014)
- Ludevít Grmela (2014–15)
- Radim Kučera (2015–17)
- Jiří Balcárek (2017–2018)
- Leoš Kalvoda (2018)
- František Šturma (2019)
- Leoš Kalvoda (2019)
- Milan Volf (2019–2020)
- David Langer (2020–2021)
- Alois Skácel (2021–2022)
- Michal Pacholík (2022)
- Darko Janacković (2023)
- Rui Capela (2023)
- Luís Filipe Silva (2023)
- Ridi Dauti (2023)
- Rui Amorim (2023–2024)
- Filipe Moreira (2024)
- Jorge Casquilha (2024–2025)
- Ihor Dudnyk (2025)
- Róbert Kafka (2025–)

== History in domestic competitions ==
- 2001–2002 Czech Fourth Division
- 2002–2010 Moravian–Silesian Football League
- 2010–2013 Czech 2. Liga
- 2013–2014 Czech First League
- 2014–2019 Czech 2. Liga
- 2019–2025 Moravian–Silesian Football League
- 2025– Czech Fourth Division

- Seasons spent at Level 1 of the football league system: 1
- Seasons spent at Level 2 of the football league system: 8
- Seasons spent at Level 3 of the football league system: 13
- Seasons spent at Level 4 of the football league system: 1

=== Czech Republic ===
Season	League	Placed	Pld	W	D	L	GF	GA	GD	Pts	Cup
2001–2002	4. liga	1st	30	20	6	4	59	27	32	66	First round
2002–2003	3. liga	7th	30	13	4	13	43	40	3	43	First round
2003–2004	3. liga	11th	30	9	7	14	47	54	-7	24	First round
2004–2005	3. liga	11th	30	9	11	10	39	42	-3	38	First round
2005–2006	3. liga	7th	30	11	10	9	47	36	11	43	Second round
2006–2007	3. liga	11th	30	12	2	16	40	49	-9	38	Second round
2007–2008	3. liga	2nd	30	18	6	6	57	35	22	60	Second round
2008–2009	3. liga	2nd	30	17	8	5	54	30	24	59	First round
2009–2010	3. liga	1st	28	18	5	5	52	23	29	59	Round of 16
2010–2011	2. liga	14th	30	10	6	14	30	40	-10	36	Second round
2011–2012	2. liga	13th	30	8	10	12	28	35	-7	34	Round of 16
2012–2013	2. liga	1st	30	17	7	6	45	24	21	58	Second round
2013–2014	1. liga	16th	30	6	9	15	32	49	−17	27	Round of 16
2014–2015	2. liga	11th	30	11	5	14	37	43	-6	38	Round of 16
2015–2016	2. liga	3rd	28	17	5	6	62	33	+29	56	Round of 32
2016–2017	2. liga	6th	30	11	8	11	49	47	+2	41	Second round
2017–2018	2. liga	9th	30	10	7	13	36	49	-13	37	Round of 32
2018–2019	2. liga	16th	30	6	7	17	37	53	−16	25	Second round
2019–2020	3. liga	13th	18	5	5	8	17	32	−15	20	First round
2020–2021	3. liga	16th	11	3	1	7	16	24	−8	10	Second round
2021–2022	3. liga	10th	32	11	5	16	62	74	−12	38	First round
2022–2023	3. liga	12th	34	11	8	15	43	67	−24	41	Preliminary round
2023–2024	3. liga	4th	34	17	8	9	60	42	+18	59	Second round
2024–2025	3. liga	18th	34	4	6	24	26	87	−61	18	withdrawn

== Honours ==
- Czech 2. Liga (second tier)
  - Champions: 2012–13
- Moravian–Silesian Football League (third tier)
  - Champions: 2009–10
- Czech Fourth Division (fourth tier)
  - Champions: 2001–02
