= Stadion FK Baník Sokolov =

Sports venue in Sokolov, Czech Republic

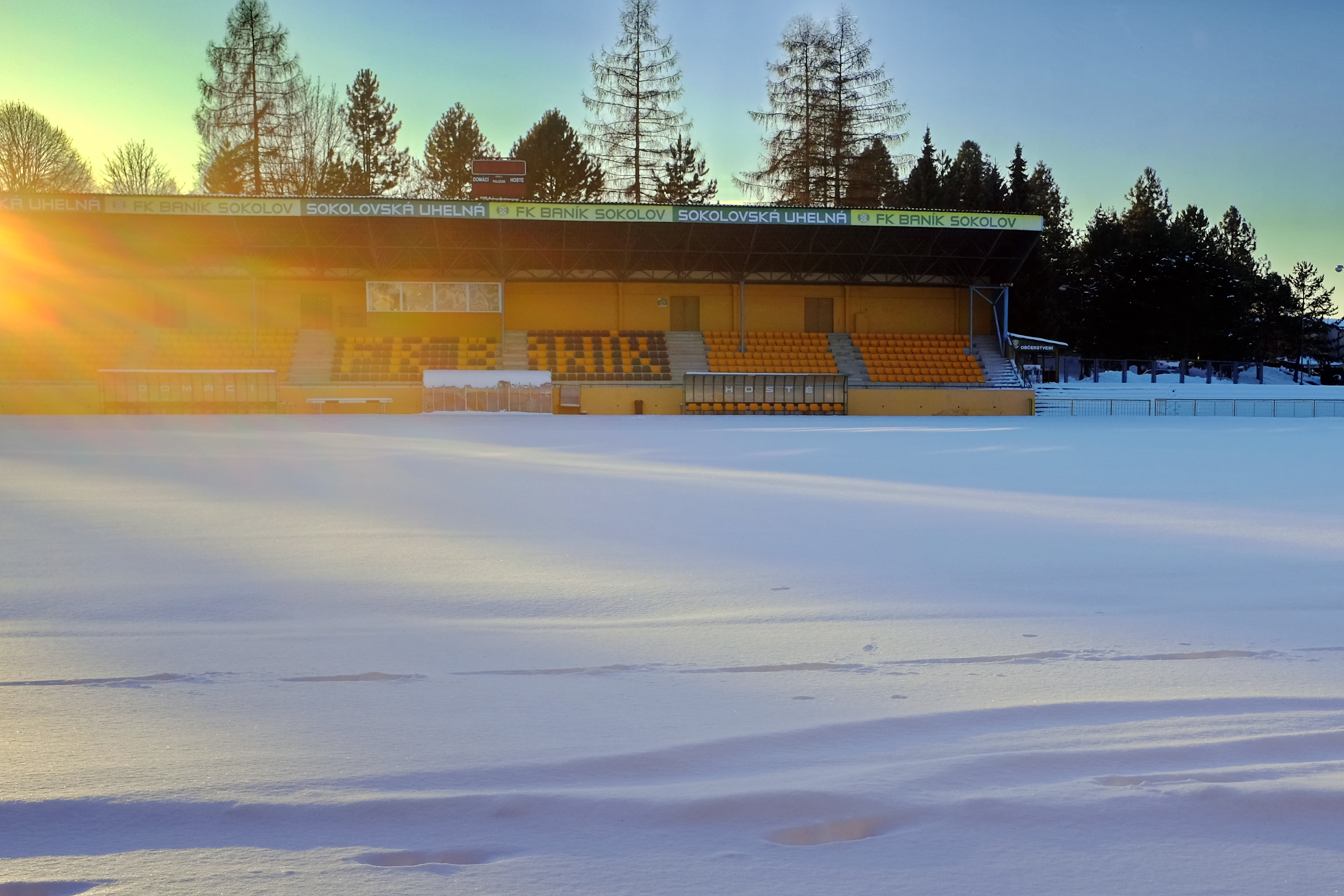
- FK Sokolov football stadium
- Interactive map of Stadion FK Baník Sokolov
- Location: Jednoty 1628, Sokolov, Czech Republic, 356 01
- Coordinates: 50°10′16″N 12°39′24″E
- Owner: Sokolov
- Capacity: 770
- Field size: 105m x 68m

Construction
- Renovated: 2008, 2014

Tenant
- FK Baník Sokolov

Stadion FK Baník Sokolov is a multi-purpose stadium in Sokolov, Czech Republic. It is mainly used for football matches and is the home ground of FK Baník Sokolov. The stadium holds 5,000 spectators, which, as of 2012, included 770 seated.
