= FK Baník Sokolov =

Association football club in the Czech Republic

- Full name: FK Baník Sokolov 1948, s.r.o.
- Founded: 1948; 78 years ago
- Ground: Stadion FK Baník Sokolov
- Capacity: 5,000 (770 seated)
- Chairman: Tomáš Provazník
- Manager: Marian Václavík
- League: Czech Fourth Division – Divize B
- 2025–26: 9th
- Website: https://www.fksokolov.cz/
Home colours	Away colours

FK Baník Sokolov is a Czech football club based in Sokolov. The club plays in Division B, which is the fourth tier of Czech football.

== Historical names ==
Club logo 2006–2023

- 1948 – SK HDB Falknov nad Ohří
- 1948 – ZTS Sokol HDB Sokolov
- 1953 – DSO Baník Sokolov
- 1962 – TJ Baník Sokolov
- 1992 – FK Baník Sokolov

== Players ==
=== Current squad ===
As of 28 August 2021.

Note: Flags indicate national team as defined under FIFA eligibility rules; some limited exceptions apply. Players may hold more than one non-FIFA nationality.

No.	Pos.	Nation	Player
1	GK	CZE	Vojtěch Štrunc
2	MF	CZE	Kryštof Kýček
4	MF	CZE	Dominik Hajdo
5	DF	UKR	Nutsu Stan
6	MF	CZE	Daniel Krlička
7	DF	CZE	Vaclav Neudert
8	DF	CZE	Vojtěch Čermuš
9	MF	CZE	Petr Řezáč
10	MF	CZE	Daniel Kovář
11	DF	CZE	Jakub Blažek
12	DF	CZE	Marek Stockner
13	MF	CZE	Patrik Fišer
14	FW	CZE	Jiří Mlika
16	FW	CZE	David Kolář
17	MF	CZE	Dan Martinec
18	MF	CZE	Jaroslav Oláh

No.	Pos.	Nation	Player
19	DF	CZE	Lukáš Šulc
20	MF	CZE	Petr Bilek
21	DF	CZE	Slavomir Strmiska
22	GK	CZE	Jakub Richter
—	GK	CZE	Jakub Dvořák
—	DF	CZE	Vaclav Heger
—	MF	CZE	Marek Stockner
—	MF	CZE	Tomas Holik
—	MF	CZE	Miroslav Hackl
—	MF	CZE	Wolfgang Dotzauer
—	MF	CZE	David Kursa
—	MF	CZE	Martin Olah
—	MF	CZE	Tomas Földes
—	MF	CZE	Josef Frič
—	MF	CZE	Matyáš Dubnický
—	FW	CZE	Jiří Procházka

=== Out on loan ===
Note: Flags indicate national team as defined under FIFA eligibility rules; some limited exceptions apply. Players may hold more than one non-FIFA nationality.

No.	Pos.	Nation	Player
4	MF	CZE	Patrik Fišer (at FK Ostrov until 30 June 2020)

== History in domestic competitions ==
- 2006–2020 Czech 2. Liga
- 2020–2023 Bohemian Football League
- 2023– Czech Fourth Division

- Seasons spent at Level 1 of the football league system: 0
- Seasons spent at Level 2 of the football league system: 14
- Seasons spent at Level 3 of the football league system: 3
- Seasons spent at Level 4 of the football league system: 2

=== Czech Republic ===
Season	League	Placed	Pld	W	D	L	GF	GA	GD	Pts	Cup
2006–2007	2. liga	6th	30	12	10	8	36	33	+3	46	Round of 64
2007–2008	2. liga	9th	30	9	13	8	26	24	+2	40	Round of 64
2008–2009	2. liga	6th	30	12	7	11	56	37	+19	43	Round of 32
2009–2010	2. liga	10th	30	9	10	11	37	43	–6	37	Round of 64
2010–2011	2. liga	6th	30	12	7	11	53	51	+2	43	Round of 16
2011–2012	2. liga	3rd	30	15	7	8	43	31	+12	52	Round of 32
2012–2013	2. liga	4th	30	14	8	8	36	26	+10	50	First round
2013–2014	2. liga	6th	30	13	7	10	33	37	–4	46	Round of 64
2014–2015	2. liga	5th	30	13	9	8	44	39	+5	48	Round of 64
2015–2016	2. liga	4th	28	10	11	7	32	26	+6	41	Round of 64
2016–2017	2. liga	13th	30	7	11	12	28	44	–16	32	Round of 64
2017–2018	2. liga	7th	30	12	5	13	34	39	–5	41	Round of 32
2018–2019	2. liga	11th	30	9	6	15	28	40	–12	33	Round of 32
2019–2020	2. liga	15th	30	7	5	18	34	51	–17	26	Round of 32
2020–2021	3. liga	16th	6	0	0	6	1	23	–22	0	First round
2021–2022	3. liga	13th	28	9	5	14	35	54	–19	32	Round of 64
2022–2023	3. liga	16th	30	7	2	21	31	63	–32	23	Prelim. round
2023–2024	4. liga (A)	5th	30	13	10	7	73	50	+23	49	Did not participate
2024–2025	4. liga (B)	7th	28	10	9	9	44	41	+3	39	
