= FC Sellier & Bellot Vlašim =

FC Vlašim
- Full name: Football Club Sellier & Bellot Vlašim a.s.
- Founded: 1922; 104 years ago
- Ground: Stadion Kollárova ulice, Vlašim
- Capacity: 6,000
- Chairman: Oldřich Jiruš
- Manager: David Střihavka
- League: Czech National Football League
- 2025–26: 9th of 16
- Website: www.fcsbvlasim.cz
Home colours

FC Sellier & Bellot Vlašim is a professional football club based in Vlašim, Czech Republic. It currently plays in Czech National Football League.

== Players ==
=== Current squad ===
As of 8 September 2026.

Note: Flags indicate national team as defined under FIFA eligibility rules; some limited exceptions apply. Players may hold more than one non-FIFA nationality.

No.	Pos.	Nation	Player
1	GK	CZE	František Kotek
2	DF	MLI	Mamadou Kone
4	DF	CZE	Václav Jindra
5	MF	CZE	Jakub Dufek
6	MF	CZE	Dominik Soukeník
7	MF	CZE	Jan Záviška
8	MF	CZE	David Hájek
9	FW	CZE	Jakub Hodek (on loan from Hradec Králové)
10	DF	CZE	Lukáš Musil
11	FW	CZE	Samuel Pikolon (on loan from Slavia Prague)
12	DF	CZE	Petr Kurka
13	MF	CZE	Jiří Hrubeš (on loan from Dukla Prague)

No.	Pos.	Nation	Player
15	MF	CZE	Jan Franěk
16	FW	CZE	Roman Teterja (on loan from Mladá Boleslav)
17	FW	UKR	Oleksandr Koval
21	FW	NGA	Basit Ahmed
22	MF	CZE	Marek Naskos
23	MF	SRB	Bojan Djordjić
24	DF	CZE	Ferdinand Říha (on loan from Sparta Prague)
26	DF	CZE	Jiří Kulhánek
27	DF	MLI	Ibrahima Kane
29	GK	CZE	David Kořán (on loan from Mladá Boleslav)
—	DF	CZE	Filip Dostál
—	FW	SEN	Deco Mané

=== Out on loan ===
Note: Flags indicate national team as defined under FIFA eligibility rules; some limited exceptions apply. Players may hold more than one non-FIFA nationality.

No. / Pos. / Nation / Player; — / FW / CZE / David Kašpárek (at Kladno)	No. / Pos. / Nation / Player; — / MF / CZE / David Beránek (at Považská Bystrica)

== Managers ==
- Zdeněk Hašek (?–2008)
- Roman Nádvorník (2009–2010)
- Boris Kočí (2011)
- Roman Nádvorník (2011)
- Luboš Urban (2011–2012)
- Martin Frýdek (2012–2013)
- Michal Horňák (2013)
- Vlastimil Petržela (2014–2016)
- Martin Hašek (2016–2017)
- Petr Havlíček (2017–2018)
- Erich Brabec (2018–2019)
- Michal Mašek (2019)
- Daniel Šmejkal (2019–2021)
- Martin Hyský (2021–2024)
- Aleš Majer (2024–2025)
- Jakub Harant (2025)
- Bohuslav Pilný (2025)
- David Střihavka (2026–)

== Honours ==
- Bohemian Football League (third tier)
  - Champions: 2008–09
