= 2008–09 Czech Cup =

Pohár ČMFS

Tournament details
- Country: Czech Republic
- Teams: 129

Final positions
- Champions: Teplice
- Runners-up: Slovácko

Tournament statistics
- Top goal scorer(s): David Střihavka; Ladislav Volešák (5 goals)

The 2008–09 Czech Cup was the 16thh edition of the annual football knockout tournament organized by the Czech Football Association of the Czech Republic. It began on 20 July 2008 with the preliminary round and ended with the final on 27 May 2009.

Teplice prevailed in Stadion Evžena Rošického, Prague at the 27 May 2009 Cup defeating 1. FC Slovácko, 1–0. 4,820 in attendance.

== Teams ==
Round	Clubs remaining	Clubs involved	Winners from previous round	New entries this round	Leagues entering this round
Preliminary round	129	34	none	34	Levels 4 and 5 in football league pyramid
First round	112	96	17	79	Czech 2. Liga; Bohemian Football League; Moravian-Silesian Football League; Level 4 in football league pyramid
Second round	64	64	48	16	Czech First League
Third round	32	32	32	none	none
Fourth round	16	16	16	none	none
Quarter finals	8	8	8	none	none
Semi finals	4	4	4	none	none
Final	2	2	2	none	none

== Preliminary round ==
Team 1	Score	Team 2
20 July 2008
Union Čelákovice	3–0	Admira Prague
Česká Lípa	1–0	Sokol Ovčáry
Vilémov	1–1 (aet, p. 4–5)	Litvínov
Sokol Zápy	5–0	Český Brod
SKP Rapid Sport	5–2	Strakonice 1908
Sokol Cholupice	1–3	Hořovicko
Podještědský FC Český Dub	0–4	RMSK Cidlina Nový Bydžov
Olympia Hradec Králové	6–3	Pardubice
Viktoria Mariánské Lázně	1–2	Jiskra Domažlice
Řezuz Děčín	2–0	Sokol Brozany
Háj ve Slezsku	2–1	D.Benešov
Mohelnice	1–2	Velké Losiny
Provodov	2–0	Napajedla
Jesenec	1–3	Protivanov
Dubňany	0–3	Šardice
Ždírec	2–2 (aet, p. 3–4)	Třebíč
Světlá n.S.	0–2	Velké Meziříčí

== First round ==
Team 1	Score	Team 2
22 July 2008
Frenštát	0–4	Fotbal Fulnek
23 July 2008
Bystřice p.H.	0–3	Fotbal Třinec
26 July 2008
Protivanov	0–1	1. HFK Olomouc
Třebíč	1–4	Vysočina Jihlava
Líšeň	1–1 (aet, p. 4–3)	1. SC Znojmo
Šardice	2–1	Břeclav
Tatran Prachatice	1–2	Dukla Prague
Hranice	3–0	Konice
Orlová	0–1	MFK Karviná
Litvínov	0–0 (aet, p. 4–5)	Baník Most
Chomutov	0–0 (aet, p. 4–5)	Ústí nad Labem
Boskovice	1–1 (aet, p. 3–1)	Kroměříž
27 July 2008
Toužim	1–4	Rakovník
Bavorovice	1–6	Sezimovo Ústí
Tachov	2–3	Karlovy Vary
Jiskra Ústí n. Orlicí	1–1 (aet, p. 7–8)	Týniště n. Orlicí
Meteor Prague VIII	2–2 (aet, p. 5–4)	Zenit Čáslav
Sokol Živanice	2–3	Hradec Králové
Jiskra Třeboň	0–3	Vlašim
Kunice	1–1 (aet, p. 3–4)	Písek
Klatovy	0–2	Slavoj Vyšehrad
Loko Vltavín	0–0 (aet, p. 4–5)	Votice
Čelákovice	0–1	Kolín
Česká Lípa	1–2	Bohemians 1905
Sokol Zápy	2–3	Velim
SKP Rapid Sport	0–9	Baník Sokolov
Hořovicko	0–0 (aet, p. 4–3)	SK Sparta Krč
RMSK Cidlina Nový Bydžov	2–3	Hlavice
Olympia Hradec Králové	3–0	Převýšov
Jiskra Domažlice	4–1	Slavia Vejprnice
Řezuz Děčín	4–0	Nový Bor
Motorlet Prague	w/o	Králův Dvůr
Holice	2–3	Dvůr Králové
Pěnčín-Turnov	2–1	Náchod-Deštné
AFK Chrudim	2–2 (aet, p. 3–4)	OEZ Letohrad
Šumperk	2–4	Uničov
Valašské Meziříčí	2–2 (aet, p. 4–5)	Viktoria Otrokovice
Velké Losiny	2–0	Zábřeh
Vyškov	0–4	1. FC Slovácko
Provodov	1–2	Brumov
Slavičín	2–2 (aet, p. 6–7)	Hulín
Háj ve Slezsku	2–4	SFC Opava
Rájec	0–1	Mutěnice
Velké Meziříčí	1–1 (aet, p. 3–2)	Žďár
Rousínov	0–0 (aet, p. 3–4)	Bystrc
Rýmařov	1–4	Hlučín
Havířov	0–5	Vítkovice
Velké Karlovice	0–1	Fotbal Frýdek-Místek

== Second round ==
Team 1	Score	Team 2
2 August 2008
Boskovice	1–0	Velké Losiny
5 August 2008
Hranice	0–0 (aet, p. 3–5)	Uničov
27 August 2008
Šardice	0–5	Mutěnice
Brumov	1–2	Baník Ostrava
2 September 2008
Bohemians 1905	1–3	Hradec Králové
Bystrc	0–3	Fotbal Fulnek
Hlučín	0–3	MFK Karviná
3 September 2008
Votice	0–0 (aet, p. 3–2)	Vlašim
Sezimovo Ústí	2–2 (aet, p. 4–2)	Příbram
Karlovy Vary	1–1 (aet, p. 6–7)	Baník Sokolov
Řezuz Děčín	2–3	Teplice
Písek	0–0 (aet, p. 6–5)	Dukla Prague
Slavoj Vyšehrad	2–1	Viktoria Žižkov
Letohrad	2–2 (aet, p. 2–4)	Jablonec
Viktoria Otrokovice	0–3	Tescoma Zlín
Líšeň	0–3	Vysočina Jihlava
Velké Meziříčí	0–4	Dynamo České Budějovice
Týniště n. O.	1–4	Brno
Hulín	0–1	1. FC Slovácko
Baník Most	1–1 (aet, p. 0–3)	Ústí nad Labem
Hlavice	2–2 (aet, p. 4–3)	Mladá Boleslav
Velim	2–2 (aet, p. 4–3)	Meteor Prague VIII
Jiskra Domažlice	0–3	Viktoria Plzeň
SFC Opava	1–1 (aet, p. 5–4)	1. HFK Olomouc
Fotbal Třinec	0–4	Sigma Olomouc
Králův Dvůr	0–3	Bohemians (Střížkov) Prague
Olympia Hradec Králové	1–1 (aet, p. 6–5)	Kolín
Fotbal Frýdek-Místek	4–2	Vítkovice
Dvůr Králové	0–3	Sparta Prague
4 September 2008
Rakovník	0–7	Slavia Prague
Turnov	0–3	Slovan Liberec
9 September 2008
Hořovicko	1–2	Kladno

== Third round ==
Team 1	Score	Team 2
23 September 2008
Fotbal Fulnek	0–2	Viktoria Plzeň
24 September 2008
Sezimovo Ústi	2–0	Baník Sokolov
Uničov	0–2	Jablonec
Mutěnice	4–0	Dynamo České Budějovice
Boskovice	0–7	Baník Ostrava
Ústí nad Labem	1–2	Kladno
Velim	2–2 (aet, p. 2–4)	Hlavice
SFC Opava	2–2 (aet, p. 3–5)	Slovan Liberec
MFK Karviná	0–2	Sigma Olomouc
Olympia Hradec Králové	1–5	Bohemians Prague (Střížkov)
25 September 2008
Votice	1–2	Slavia Prague
Fotbal Frýdek-Místek	0–0 (aet, p. 1–4)	Sparta Prague
30 September 2008
Slavoj Vyšehrad	0–2	Hradec Králové
1 October 2008
Písek	1–4	Teplice
1. FC Slovácko	0–0 (aet, p. 4–3)	Brno
7 October 2008
Vysočina Jihlava	1–1 (aet, p. 2–4)	Tescoma Zlín

== Fourth round ==
Team 1	Score	Team 2
22 October 2008
Sezimovo Ústi	0–4	Slavia Prague
28 October 2008
Sigma Olomouc	0–2	Slovan Liberec
29 October 2008
Hradec Králové	0–1	Teplice
Jablonec	1–2	Tescoma Zlín
1. FC Slovácko	1–1 (aet, p. 7–6)	Kladno
Hlavice	1–7	Viktoria Plzeň
Sparta Prague	2–0	Bohemians (Střížkov) Prague
30 October 2008
Mutěnice	0–3	Baník Ostrava

== Quarter-finals ==
The first legs were played on 8 and 9 April 2009. The second legs were played on 22 and 23 April 2009.

Team 1	Agg.	Team 2	1st leg	2nd leg
Tescoma Zlín	0–3	Slavia Prague	0–0	0–3
Teplice	2–0	Slovan Liberec	0–0	2–0
1. FC Slovácko	2–1	Baník Ostrava	1–0	1–1
Sparta Prague	3–0	Viktoria Plzeň	0–0	3–0

=== First leg ===
8 April 2009	1. FC Slovácko	1–0	Baník Ostrava	Uherské Hradiště
18:00 CEST	Chmelíček 90+3' (pen.)	Report		Stadium: Městský fotbalový stadion Miroslava Valenty; Attendance: 4,976; Referee: Michal Paták

8 April 2009	Tescoma Zlín	0–0	Slavia Prague	Zlín
18:00 CEST		Report		Stadium: Letná Stadion; Attendance: 2,403; Referee: Jan Jílek

9 April 2009	Teplice	0–0	Slovan Liberec	Teplice
17:30 CEST		Report		Stadium: Na Stínadlech; Attendance: 1,630; Referee: Pavel Franěk

9 April 2009	Sparta Prague	0–0	Viktoria Plzeň	Prague
18:00 CEST		Report		Stadium: AXA Arena; Attendance: 1,393; Referee: Jiří Jech

=== Second leg ===
22 April 2009	Baník Ostrava	1–1 (1–2 agg.)	1. FC Slovácko	Ostrava
17:00 CEST	Mičola 25'	Report	Bolf 66' (o.g.)	Stadium: Bazaly; Attendance: 4,203; Referee: Libor Kovařík

22 April 2009	Viktoria Plzeň	0–3 (0–3 agg.)	Sparta Prague	Plzeň
17:30 CEST		Report	Kulič 21'; Kladrubský 55' (pen.); Vacek 60'	Stadium: Stadion města Plzně; Attendance: 4,380; Referee: Jan Jílek

22 April 2009	Slovan Liberec	0–2 (0–2 agg.)	Teplice	Liberec
17:30 CEST		Report	Vachoušek 54'; Klein 71'	Stadium: Stadion u Nisy; Attendance: 2,500; Referee: Radek Příhoda

23 April 2009	Slavia Prague	3–0 (3–0 agg.)	Tescoma Zlín	Prague
18:00 CEST	Pekhart 4'; M. Černý 25'; Besta 82'	Report		Stadium: Synot Tip Arena; Attendance: 3,457; Referee: Jiří Jech

== Semi-finals ==
The first legs were played on 6 and 7 May 2009. The second legs were played on 13 May 2009.

Team 1	Agg.	Team 2	1st leg	2nd leg
Slavia Prague	1–3	1. FC Slovácko	0–1	1–2
Sparta Prague	1–1 (p. 4–5)	Teplice	1–0	0–1

=== First leg ===
6 May 2009	Slavia Prague	0–1	1. FC Slovácko	Prague
18:00 CEST		Report	Formánek 63'	Stadium: Synot Tip Arena; Attendance: 2,463; Referee: Karel Hrubeš

7 May 2009	Sparta Prague	1–0	Teplice	Prague
18:00 CEST	Kušnír 82'	Report		Stadium: AXA Arena; Attendance: 1,308; Referee: Milan Makovička

=== Second leg ===
13 May 2009	1. FC Slovácko	2–1 (3–1 agg.)	Slavia Prague	Uherské Hradiště
18:00 CEST	Ondřejka 84'; Cléber 90'	Report	Ivana 65'	Stadium: Městský fotbalový stadion Miroslava Valenty; Attendance: 8,121; Referee: Pavel Franěk

13 May 2009	Teplice	1–0 (1–1 agg.) (5–4 p)	Sparta Prague	Teplice
18:00 CEST	Mahmutović 83'	Report		Stadium: Na Stínadlech; Attendance: 3,943; Referee: Jiří Adam
	Penalties
	Matula (penalty scored); Doležal (penalty scored); Mareš (penalty scored); Verbíř (penalty scored); Klein (penalty scored)		(penalty scored) Kucka; (penalty scored) Kušnír; (penalty scored) Berger; (penalty scored) Kladrubský; (penalty missed) Piroska

== Final ==
27 May 2009
17:00 CEST

Teplice	1–0	1. FC Slovácko
Mahmutović 49'

Stadion Evžena Rošického, Prague
Attendance: 4,820
Referee: Libor Kovařík

== See also ==
- 2008–09 Czech First League
- 2008–09 Czech 2. Liga
