= 2015–16 Czech Cup =

MOL Cup

Tournament details
- Country: Czech Republic
- Teams: 135

Final positions
- Champions: Mladá Boleslav
- Runners-up: Jablonec

Tournament statistics
- Top goal scorer: Jan Chramosta (7 goals)

The 2015–16 Czech Cup, known as the MOL Cup for sponsorship reasons, was the 23nd season of the annual knockout football tournament of the Czech Republic. It began with the preliminary round on 18 July 2015 and ended with the final on 18 May 2016. As winners of the cup, FK Mladá Boleslav gained the right to play in the third qualifying round of the 2016–17 UEFA Europa League.

== Preliminary round ==
The preliminary round ties were scheduled for 18 – 19 July 2015. 66 teams competed in this round, all from level 4 or below of the Czech league system.

Team 1	Score	Team 2
18 July 2015
Holice (5)	2–0	OEZ Letohrad (4)
Rakovník (4)	0–2	Meteor Praha VIII (4)
Blansko (4)	0–3	Líšeň (3)
Dvůr Králové (4)	3–0	Sparta Kutná Hora (4)
Havířov (4)	1–2	Lokomotiva Petrovice (4)
Kladno (4)	3–1	Aritma Prague (4)
Sokol Kratonohy (5)	1–1 (4–5 p)	Sokol Jablonec nad Jizerou (4)
OSS Lomnice (5)	1–5	Senco Doubravka (4)
Jiskra Mšeno (5)	1–5	Nový Bor (4)
Odra Petřkovice (4)	1–2	Dolní Benešov (4)
Stap Tratec Vilémov (4)	2–2 (4–3 p)	Lovosice (4)
Sokol Živanice (4)	4–1	Benátky nad Jizerou (3)
Chomutov (4)	2–1	Baník Souš (4)
19 July 2015
Ústí nad Labem (2)	2–1	Valašské Meziříčí (4)
ZVVZ Milevsko (4)	0–3	Klatovy 1898 (4)
Uherský Brod (4)	1–2	Hodonín (4)
Brandýs nad Labem (6)	3–0	Sokol Nové Strašecí (4)
ABC Braník (5)	3–2	Sokol Libiš (4)
FC Chotíkov 1932 (5)	2–2 (0–3 p)	Hořovicko (4)
Slovan Havlíčkův Brod (4)	0–1	Pelhřimov (4)
Hradiště (7)	1–8	Slavoj Český Krumlov (4)
Jiskra Jaroměř (4)	0–6	Trutnov (4)
Litvínov (4)	0–1	Admira Prague (4)
SK Mondi Štětí (5)	1–1 (0–3 p)	FK Litoměřice (4)
Olympia Hradec Králové (4)	2–0	Pěnčín–Turnov (4)
ZČE Plzeň (4)	2–4	Karlovy Vary (4)
Louny (4)	1–1 (3–4 p)	Neratovice–Byškovice (4)
Semily (4)	5–2	Jiskra Ústí nad Orlicí (4)
Tatran Sedlčany (4)	1–2	Český Brod (4)
Vysoké Mýto (4)	3–1	Úvaly (4)
Nedachlebice (6)	0–4	Viktorie Přerov (4)
FC Vsetín (4)	1–1 (3–4 p)	Velké Karlovice+Karolinka (4)
Nová Ves (6)	4–3	Bystřice nad Pernštejnem (4)

== First round ==
The first round ties were scheduled for 24 – 30 July 2015.

Team 1	Score	Team 2
24 July 2015
Sokol Ústí (5)	1–2	MFK Frýdek-Místek (2)
25 July 2015
Holice (5)	0–1	Chrudim (3)
Admira Prague (4)	0–3	Vlašim (2)
Meteor Praha VIII (4)	1–1 (4–5 p)	Tachov (3)
Slavoj Český Krumlov (4)	2–2 (4–2 p)	Písek (3)
Hořovicko (4)	0–1	Baník Sokolov (2)
Senco Doubravka (4)	0–5	České Budějovice (2)
FK Litoměřice (4)	0–5	Varnsdorf (2)
Nový Bor (4)	0–1	Pardubice (2)
Olympia Hradec Králové (4)	1–0	Benešov (3)
Karlovy Vary (4)	3–1	Jiskra Domažlice (3)
Stap Tratec Vilémov (4)	2–4	Baník Most (3)
Neratovice–Byškovice (4)	2–1	Sokol Brozany (3)
Chomutov (4)	0–2	Štěchovice (3)
Semily (4)	0–3	Dobrovice (3)
Český Brod (4)	0–1	Ústí nad Labem (2)
Sokol Jablonec nad Jizerou (4)	2–2 (3–4 p)	FK Čáslav (3)
Vysoké Mýto (4)	0–3	Union 2013 Nový Bydžov (3)
Dvůr Králové (4)	0–3	Táborsko (2)
Kladno (4)	0–4	Králův Dvůr (3)
Sokol Živanice (4)	2–4	Převýšov (3)
Sokol Zápy (3)	2–2 (6–7 p)	Kolín (3)
Dolní Benešov (4)	1–2	Jiskra Rýmařov (4)
Viktorie Přerov (4)	0–2	Vyškov (3)
Velké Karlovice+Karolinka (4)	2–1	Brumov (4)
Nová Ves (6)	0–6	Velké Meziříčí (3)
Líšeň (3)	1–2	Kroměříž (3)
Hodonín (4)	0–4	Prostějov (3)
Lokomotiva Petrovice (4)	0–1	Vítkovice (3)
Pelhřimov (4)	1–4	Znojmo (2)
Sokol Tasovice (4)	2–1	Břeclav (3)
Hranice (4)	1–5	Karviná (2)
Mohelnice (3)	4–3	Uničov (3)
Nový Jičín (4)	0–5	Fotbal Třinec (2)
Slovan Rosice (4)	1–0	1. HFK Olomouc (3)
Slavičín (4)	4–0	Viktoria Otrokovice (3)
26 July 2015
ABC Braník (5)	1–8	Slavoj Vyšehrad (2)
Brandýs nad Labem (6)	0–2	Loko Vltavín (3)
Trutnov (4)	0–4	Hradec Králové (2)
Krnov (4)	2–4	Hlučín (3)
Šumperk (4)	0–3	Opava (2)
Stará Říše (4)	4–0	Třebíč (3)
30 July 2015
Klatovy 1898 (4)	1–0	Viktoria Žižkov (3)

== Second round ==
The second round ties were scheduled for 26 August – 2 September 2015.

Team 1	Score	Team 2
26 August 2015
Stará Říše (4)	2–3	Vysočina Jihlava (1)
Sokol Tasovice (4)	1–3	Znojmo (2)
Vyškov (3)	1–1 (6–7 p)	Kroměříž (3)
27 August 2015
Slavoj Český Krumlov (4)	2–3	České Budějovice (2)
Jiskra Rýmařov (4)	4–3	Baník Ostrava (1)
Prostějov (3)	0–0 (5–4 p)	Fotbal Třinec (2)
28 August 2015
Union 2013 Nový Bydžov (3)	0–7	Slavia Prague (1)
Loko Vltavín (3)	1–9	1. FK Příbram (1)
Neratovice–Byškovice (4)	0–4	Dukla Prague (1)
Klatovy 1898 (4)	1–0	Baník Most (3)
Velké Meziříčí (3)	1–2	Zbrojovka Brno (1)
29 August 2015
Olympia Hradec Králové (4)	1–2	Bohemians 1905 (1)
Karlovy Vary (4)	2–6	Táborsko (2)
Dobrovice (3)	1–2	Varnsdorf (2)
Králův Dvůr (3)	1–1 (3–1 p)	Vlašim (2)
Hlučín (3)	0–1	Opava (2)
Mohelnice (3)	1–2	MFK Frýdek-Místek (2)
Slavičín (4)	2–0	FC Slovácko (1)
Velké Karlovice+Karolinka (4)	1–6	Fastav Zlín (1)
Vítkovice (3)	2–2 (3–5 p)	Karviná (2)
Tachov (3)	2–2 (5–3 p)	Baník Sokolov (2)
Chrudim (3)	0–5	Hradec Králové (2)
30 August 2015
Štěchovice (3)	1–4	FK Teplice (1)
FK Čáslav (3)	0–3	Slavoj Vyšehrad (2)
Kolín (3)	1–2	Ústí nad Labem (2)
Převýšov (3)	1–2	MFK Frýdek-Místek (2)
2 September 2015
Slovan Rosice (4)	0–5	Sigma Olomouc (1)

== Third round ==
The third round ties were scheduled for 22 September – 6 October 2015.

Team 1	Score	Team 2
22 September 2015
Táborsko (2)	1–2	Dukla Prague (1)
Prostějov (3)	1–4	Fastav Zlín (1)
Ústí nad Labem (2)	4–2	Slavia Prague (1)
23 September 2015
Tachov (3)	0–2	Viktoria Plzeň (1)
Králův Dvůr (3)	1–1 (4–5 p)	Sparta Prague (1)
Pardubice (2)	3–0	FK Teplice (1)
Varnsdorf (2)	0–0 (2–3 p)	Slovan Liberec (1)
Slavičín (4)	1–2	MFK Frýdek-Místek (2)
Kroměříž (3)	0–1	Zbrojovka Brno (1)
Znojmo (2)	0–5	Vysočina Jihlava (1)
29 September 2015
Slavoj Vyšehrad (2)	0–2	Jablonec (1)
Klatovy 1898 (4)	0–5	Mladá Boleslav (1)
České Budějovice (2)	2–5	1. FK Příbram (1)
Opava (2)	1–5	Sigma Olomouc (1)
30 September 2015
Hradec Králové (2)	1–0	Bohemians 1905 (1)
6 October 2015
Jiskra Rýmařov (4)	0–3	Karviná (2)

== Fourth round ==
Team 1	Agg.	Team 2	1st leg	2nd leg
Ústí nad Labem (2)	0–6	Dukla Prague (1)	0–3	0–3
Slovan Liberec (1)	1–1 (7–6 p)	Fastav Zlín (1)	1–0	0–1
Vysočina Jihlava (1)	2–3	Sigma Olomouc (1)	0–1	2–2
Pardubice (2)	2–3	Sparta Prague (1)	1–0	1–3
Karviná (2)	0–4	Mladá Boleslav (1)	0–1	0–3
Viktoria Plzeň (1)	3–1	Zbrojovka Brno (1)	2–1	1–0
MFK Frýdek-Místek (2)	0–5	Jablonec (1)	0–2	0–3
Hradec Králové (2)	5–2	Příbram (1)	0–1	5–1

== Quarter-finals ==
The draw for the quarter-finals was held on 7 December 2015. The first legs were scheduled for 2 March, and the second legs for 16 March 2016.

Team 1	Agg.	Team 2	1st leg	2nd leg
Hradec Králové (2)	2–5	Mladá Boleslav (1)	1–4	1–1
Slovan Liberec (1)	2–3	Sparta Prague (1)	2–1	0–2
Dukla Prague (1)	1–2	Jablonec (1)	0–0	1–2
Viktoria Plzeň (1)	5–3	Sigma Olomouc (1)	4–2	1–1

=== First legs ===
16 March 2016	FC Hradec Králové	1–4	FK Mladá Boleslav	Hradec Králové
	Pazler 41'		Baroš 20' (pen.); Chramosta 66', 84'; Takács 86'	Stadium: Všesportovní stadion Referee: Pavel Julínek

3 March 2016	FC Slovan Liberec	2–1	AC Sparta Prague	Liberec
	Rabušic 45+2'; Bakoš 79'		Konaté 42'	Stadium: Stadion u Nisy; Referee: Pavel Franěk

3 March 2016	FK Dukla Prague	0–0	Jablonec	Prague
				Stadium: Stadion Juliska; Referee: Petr Ardeleánu

2 March 2016	FC Viktoria Plzeň	4–2	SK Sigma Olomouc	Plzeň
	Matějů 11'; Holenda 31'; Krmenčík 66'; Kovařík 84'		Ordoš 57'; Plšek 74' (pen.)	Stadium: Doosan Arena; Referee: Ondřej Berka

=== Second legs ===
30 March 2016	FK Mladá Boleslav	1–1 (5–2 agg.)	FC Hradec Králové	Mladá Boleslav
	Chramosta 84'		Shejbal 54'	Stadium: Městský stadion Referee: Josef Váňa

30 March 2016	AC Sparta Prague	2–0 (3–2 agg.)	FC Slovan Liberec	Prague
	Jiráček 27'; Fatai 80'			Stadium: Generali Arena; Referee: Jiří Jech

15 March 2016	Jablonec	2–1 (2–1 agg.)	FK Dukla Prague	Jablonec nad Nisou
	Doležal 52', 59'		Beauguel 33'	Stadium: Stadion Střelnice; Referee: Radek Příhoda

16 March 2016	SK Sigma Olomouc	1–1 (3–5 agg.)	FC Viktoria Plzeň	Olomouc
	Ordos 22'		Kopic 63'	Stadium: Andrův stadion Referee: Ondřej Pechanec

== Semi-finals ==
Team 1	Agg.	Team 2	1st leg	2nd leg
Mladá Boleslav (1)	1–0	Viktoria Plzeň (1)	1–0	0–0
Jablonec (1)	4–1	Sparta Prague (1)	2–0	2–1

=== First legs ===
5 April 2016	FK Mladá Boleslav	1–0	FC Viktoria Plzeň	Mladá Boleslav
	Čermák 74'			Stadium: Městský stadion Referee: Emanuel Marek

27 April 2016	Jablonec	2–0	AC Sparta Prague	Jablonec nad Nisou
	Greguš 8'; Trávník 50'			Stadium: Stadion Střelnice; Referee: Petr Ardeleánu

=== Second legs ===
13 April 2016	FC Viktoria Plzeň	0–0 (0–1 agg.)	FK Mladá Boleslav	Plzeň
				Stadium: Doosan Arena; Referee: Pavel Franěk

4 May 2016	AC Sparta Prague	1–2 (1–4 agg.)	Jablonec	Prague
	Turyna 54'		Wágner 22'; Doležal 39'	Stadium: Generali Arena; Referee: Pavel Královec

== Final ==
The final was played on 18 May 2016 at the Na Stínadlech stadium in Teplice between FK Mladá Boleslav and FK Jablonec. Boleslav won 2–0 for their second Czech Cup win, adding to their victory in 2011.

18 May 2016	FK Mladá Boleslav	2–0	Jablonec	Teplice
18:15	Chramosta 71'; Šćuk 74'			Stadium: Na Stínadlech; Attendance: 2,543; Referee: Karel Hrubeš

== See also ==
- 2015–16 Czech First League
- 2015–16 Czech National Football League
