= 2013–14 Czech Cup =

Pohár ČMFS

Tournament details
- Country: Czech Republic
- Teams: 133

Final positions
- Champions: Sparta Prague
- Runners-up: Viktoria Plzeň

Tournament statistics
- Top goal scorer: Josef Čtvrtníček (5 goals)

The 2013–14 Czech Cup was the twenty-first season of the annual football knock-out tournament of the Czech Republic. It began on 13 July 2013 with the preliminary round and ended with the final on 17 May 2014. The winners of the competition would have qualified for the third qualifying round of the 2014–15 UEFA Europa League, however, since both finalists (Sparta Prague and Viktoria Plzeň) qualified for Europe through their league position, the Europa League berth for the cup winners was assigned to a team in the league instead. Sparta Prague won the final 8–7 on penalties after the match finished 1–1, earning them a league-cup double.

== Preliminary round ==
The preliminary round ties were played on 13 & 14 July 2013

Team 1	Score	Team 2
13 July 2013
ČSK Uherský Brod (4)	2–3	FC ELSEREMO Brumov (4)
FK Blansko (4)	0–1	Dosta Bystrc (4)
FSC Stará Říše (4)	4–0	Velké Meziříčí (4)
SFK Vrchovina Nové Město (4)	1–3	FK Pelhřimov (4)
14 July 2013
FC Olympia Hradec Králové (5)	1–1 (5–6 p)	Dvůr Králové (4)
SK VTJ Rapid Liberec (4)	1–3	FC Nový Bor (4)
Jablonec nad Jizerou (4)	2–2 (8–7 p)	Pěnčín-Turnov (4)
Zličín (4)	1–1 (5–6 p)	FK Hořovicko (4)
FK Dobrovice (4)	1–5	Nová Paka (4)
FK Litol (4)	1–2	FK Lovochemie Lovosice (4)
MSA Dolní Benešov (4)	4–3	MFK Havířov (4)
Nový Jičín (4)	1–0	TJ Sokol Lískovec (4)
Vyškov (4)	1–2	Mohelnice (4)
Sokol Tasovice (4)	2–1	Tatran Brno Bohunice (4)
Žďas Žďár nad Sázavou (3)	1–3	Slovan Rosice (4)
FC Jílové (6)	1–1 (4–5 p)	Tempo Prague (6)
SK Vysoké Mýto (4)	0–3	TJ Svitavy (4)
Lokomotiva Veselí n.Lužnicí (7)	0–4	Hodonín (4)
FC Vřesina (7)	2–1	TJ Lokomotiva Petrovice (4)
SK Štítná nad Vlář (6)	1–1 (5–3 p)	Slavičín (4)
FK Litoměřice (5)	2–0	FK Baník Souš (4)
TJ Sušice (4)	1–1 (5–6 p)	Senco Doubravka (4)
Dražice (5)	3–1	FK Slavoj Český Krumlov (7)
TJ Valašské Meziříčí (4)	1–2	Hranice (4)
SK Mondi Štětí (4)	4–4 (4–2 p)	Neratovice-Byškovice (4)
FK Ostrov (5)	1–5	FK Slavoj Žatec (4)
Sokol Živanice (4)	3–1	Jiskra Ústí nad Orlicí (4)
SK ZČE Plzeň (4)	2–0	Tachov (4)
TJ Jesenik (6)	1–3	Šumperk (4)

== First round ==
Team 1	Score	Team 2
19 July 2013
MSA Dolní Benešov (4)	0–4	Opava (3)
Kutná Hora (4)	0–2	Chrudim (3)
Šumperk (4)	0–5	Uničov (3)
20 July 2013
Hodonín (4)	1–5	Břeclav (3)
FK Hořovicko (4)	0–0 (5–3 p)	Bohemians Prague (2)
SK ZČE Plzeň (4)	0–3	Rokycany (4)
Mohelnice (4)	0–5	Zlín (2)
SK Mondi Štětí (4)	1–4	Chomutov (3)
Tempo Prague (6)	2–2 (3–4 p)	Štěchovice (3)
Dražice (5)	0–2	Písek (4)
Dvůr Králové (4)	1–1 (13–12 p)	Sokol Živanice (4)
FK Slavoj Žatec (4)	2–3	Karlovy Vary (3)
FK Litoměřice (5)	2–6	Ústí nad Labem (2)
FC Nový Bor (4)	0–3	Varnsdorf (2)
Jablonec nad Jizerou (4)	2–1	Letohrad (4)
FK Lovochemie Lovosice (4)	2–4	Admira Praha (3)
Milevsko (4)	0–3	Táborsko (2)
Strakonice (3)	w/o	České Budějovice (2)
Hvězda Cheb (4)	1–3	Baník Sokolov (2)
Benešov (4)	0–2	Vlašim (2)
Český Brod (4)	2–2 (3–4 p)	Loko Vltavín (2)
Slavoj Vyšehrad (4)	4–3	Kunice (3)
Kladno (4)	3–0	Králův Dvůr (3)
Úvaly (4)	0–0 (4–3 p)	Sokol Zápy (3)
Kolín (3)	3–0	Meteor Praha (3)
Roudnice (3)	2–1	Baník Most (2)
Náchod Deštné (4)	0–1	Pardubice (2)
FC Vřesina (7)	1–8	Karviná (2)
Dosta Bystrc (4)	3–2	Viktoria Otrokovice (4)
Hranice (4)	1–1 (4–5 p)	HFK Olomouc (3)
FSC Stará Říše (4)	1–2	Třebíč (3)
Nový Jičín (4)	1–6	Třinec (2)
FK Pelhřimov (4)	1–3	Slovan Rosice (4)
Přerov (4)	0–3	Hanácká Slávia Kroměříž (3)
Hlučín (3)	3–0	Slavia Orlová-Lutuně (3)
Líšeň (4)	0–1	Frýdek-Místek (2)
Zábřeh (3)	1–3	Mikulovice (3)
Senco Doubravka (4)	2–6	Jiskra Domažlice (3)
21 July 2013
TJ Svitavy (4)	1–1 (5–4 p)	Zenit Čáslav (3)
Nová Paka (4)	1–3	Hradec Králové (2)
Trutnov (4)	1–2	Převýšov (3)
Horní Měcholupy (3)	2–7	Viktoria Žižkov (2)
SK Štítná nad Vlář (6)	0–1	FC ELSEREMO Brumov (4)
Sokol Tasovice (4)	1–4	Prostějov (3)

== Second round ==
Team 1	Score	Team 2
20 August 2013
Kladno (4)	2–1	Rokycany (4)
Karlovy Vary (3)	3–3 (4–3 p)	Baník Sokolov (2)
Třebíč (3)	0–5	Znojmo (1)
Prostějov (3)	2–2 (0–3 p)	Fastav Zlín (2)
Vlašim (2)	6–1	Loko Vltavín (2)
Štěchovice (3)	1–4	Dukla Prague (1)
21 August 2013
Mikulovice (3)	1–2	Sigma Olomouc (1)
Chrudim (3)	2–1	Kolín (3)
Slovan Rosice (4)	1–6	Vysočina Jihlava (1)
Dosta Bystrc (4)	0–3	HFK Olomouc (3)
Uničov (3)	0–1	Zbrojovka Brno (1)
Dvůr Králové (4)	0–7	Hradec Králové (2)
FK Hořovicko (4)	0–2	Ústí nad Labem (2)
Hanácká Slávia Kroměříž (3)	1–3	Baník Ostrava (1)
Hlučín (3)	2–0	Opava (3)
Jablonec nad Jizerou (4)	0–1	Pardubice (2)
Frýdek-Místek (2)	1–2	Třinec (2)
Písek (4)	0–1	České Budějovice (2)
TJ Svitavy (4)	0–2	Převýšov (3)
Slavoj Vyšehrad (4)	2–4	Viktoria Žižkov (2)
27 August
Úvaly (4)	0–4	Mladá Boleslav (1)
28 August 2013
FC ELSEREMO Brumov (4)	0–1	Karviná (2)
Varnsdorf (2)	2–0	Teplice (1)
Admira Praha (3)	1–1 (2–4 p)	Roudnice (3)
Chomutov (3)	0–7	Slavia Prague (1)
3 September 2013
Táborsko (2)	0–1	Příbram (1)
4 September 2013
Jiskra Domažlice (3)	2–1	Bohemians 1905 (1)
Břeclav (3)	0–3	Slovácko (1)

== Third round ==
Team 1	Score	Team 2
18 September 2013
HFK Olomouc (3)	1–2	Slavia Prague (1)
24 September 2013
Fastav Zlín (2)	0–1	Sparta Prague (1)
25 September 2013
Jiskra Domažlice (3)	3–1	Karviná (2)
Chrudim (3)	0–2	Sigma Olomouc (1)
Varnsdorf (2)	2–2 (5–3 p)	Vlašim (2)
Roudnice (3)	0–4	Zbrojovka Brno (1)
Viktoria Žižkov (2)	2–2 (5–4 p)	Slovan Liberec (1)
Hradec Králové (2)	0–1	Baumit Jablonec (1)
Ústí nad Labem (2)	2–0	Baník Ostrava (1)
Hlučín (3)	1–5	Mladá Boleslav (1)
Pardubice (2)	1–2	Slovácko (1)
Třinec (2)	1–1 (6–7 p)	Dukla Prague (1)
Převýšov (3)	1–4	Znojmo (1)
2 October 2013
Karlovy Vary (3)	0–1	Vysočina Jihlava (1)
České Budějovice (2)	0–0 (2–4 p)	Příbram (1)
12 October 2013
Kladno (4)	1–3	Viktoria Plzeň (1)

== Fourth round ==
Team 1	Agg.	Team 2	1st leg	2nd leg
Viktoria Plzeň (1)	7–0	Jiskra Domažlice (3)	3–0	4–0
Sigma Olomouc (1)	0–4	Vysočina Jihlava (1)	0–4	0–0
Varnsdorf (2)	0–1	Slavia Prague (1)	0–0	0–1
Viktoria Žižkov (2)	1–4	Zbrojovka Brno (1)	1–0	0–4
Baumit Jablonec (1)	3–0	Ústí nad Labem (2)	1–0	2–0
Mladá Boleslav (1)	3–0	Slovácko (1)	1–0	2–0
Dukla Prague (1)	6–1	Příbram (1)	4–0	2–1
Znojmo (1)	3–5	Sparta Prague (1)	2–3	1–2

== Quarter-finals ==
Team 1	Agg.	Team 2	1st leg	2nd leg
FC Viktoria Plzeň	(a)3–3	Vysočina Jihlava	1–0	2–3
Slavia Prague	1–1 (4–5 p)	Zbrojovka Brno	0–1	1–0
Baumit Jablonec	2–1	Mladá Boleslav	2–0	0–1
Dukla Prague	2–3	Sparta Prague	2–1	0–2

=== First legs ===
26 March 2014	Dukla Prague	2–1	Sparta Prague	Prague
18:00	Mareš 37'; Pospěch 65' (pen.)	Report	Krejčí 80'	Stadium: Stadion Juliska; Attendance: 2,943; Referee: Tomáš Kocourek

26 March 2014	Slavia Prague	0–1	Zbrojovka Brno	Prague
18:30		Report	Šisler 63'	Stadium: Eden Arena; Attendance: 2,542; Referee: Radek Příhoda

27 March 2014	Baumit Jablonec	2–0	Mladá Boleslav	Jablonec nad Nisou
17:00	Rossi 34'; Kopic 40'	Report		Stadium: Chance Arena; Attendance: 1,856; Referee: Jiří Jech

1 April 2014	Viktoria Plzeň	1–0	Vysočina Jihlava	Plzeň
18:00	Kovařík 77'	Report		Stadium: Doosan Arena; Attendance: 6,102; Referee: Ondřej Lerch

=== Second legs ===
2 April 2014	Sparta Prague	2–0 (3–2 agg.)	Dukla Prague	Prague
17:00	Lafata 34', 41'	Report		Stadium: Generali Arena; Attendance: 2,795; Referee: Jan Jílek

2 April 2014	Zbrojovka Brno	0–1 (1–1 agg.) (5–4 p)	Slavia Prague	Brno
18:00		Report	Škoda 80'	Stadium: Městský fotbalový stadion Srbská; Attendance: 2,031; Referee: Zbynek Proske
	Penalties
	Zavadil (penalty scored); Šisler (penalty scored); Keresteš (penalty scored); Marković (penalty scored); Skalák (penalty scored)		(penalty scored) Necid; (penalty missed) Juhar; (penalty scored) Gecov; (penalty scored) Hruby; (penalty scored) Nitrianský

3 April 2014	Mladá Boleslav	1–0 (2–1 agg.)	Baumit Jablonec	Mladá Boleslav
18:00	Šćuk 21'	Report		Stadium: Městský stadion Attendance: 1,297; Referee: Pavel Královec

9 April 2014	Vysočina Jihlava	3–2 (3(a)–3 agg.)	Viktoria Plzeň	Jihlava
18:00	Karlík 32'; Mešanović 37'; Vepřek 90'	Report	Tecl 15'; Kovařík 50' (pen.)	Stadium: Stadion v Jiráskově ulici Attendance: 3,389; Referee: Jiří Jech

== Semi-finals ==
The semi-finals were played between 16 April and 1 May.

Team 1	Agg.	Team 2	1st leg	2nd leg
Viktoria Plzeň	2–0	Zbrojovka Brno	2–0	0–0
Baumit Jablonec	3–5	Sparta Prague	3–1	0–4

=== First legs ===
16 April 2014	Baumit Jablonec	3–1	Sparta Prague	Jablonec nad Nisou
16:45	Rossi 35'; Kopic 70'; Čížek 87'	Report	Přikryl 84'	Stadium: Chance Arena; Attendance: 7,056; Referee: Radek Příhoda

17 April 2014	Viktoria Plzeň	2–0	Zbrojovka Brno	Plzeň
17:30	Tecl 2'; Ďuriš 88'	Report		Stadium: Doosan Arena; Attendance: 2,396; Referee: Karel Hrubeš

=== Second legs ===
30 April 2014	Sparta Prague	4–0 (5–3 agg.)	Baumit Jablonec	Prague
18:00	Kadeřábek 29'; Hybš 35'; Hušbauer 55'; Vácha 60'	Report		Stadium: Generali Arena; Attendance: 3,395; Referee: Pavel Franek

1 May 2014	Zbrojovka Brno	0–0 (0–2 agg.)	Viktoria Plzeň	Brno
19:00		Report		Stadium: Městský fotbalový stadion Srbská; Attendance: 3,286; Referee: Jaroslav Bilek

== Final ==
The final was played at Eden Arena on 17 May 2014. Sparta Prague, having already mathematically won the 2013–14 Czech First League two weeks previously, were aiming for a double. The game remained in goalless deadlock until the 79th minute when Radim Řezník gave Plzeň the lead. In the dying minutes of stoppage time, Milan Petržela conceded a penalty for handball, which was converted by Josef Hušbauer. The match proceeded to a penalty shootout involving every outfield player in each team, with Petržela having his decisive penalty saved by Tomáš Vaclík.

Initial ticket sales were soon halted by the football association due to "radical hooligans from the Czech Republic, Poland and Slovakia" purchasing tickets en-masse. Sales were reopened on 11 May, but tickets were restricted to the stands behind each goal, and could only be bought from each club at their stadium. Fans staged a protest during which they sat in silence for the first thirty minutes of the match.

17 May 2014	Sparta Prague	1–1 (8–7 p)	Viktoria Plzeň	Prague
18:45	Hušbauer 90+5' (pen.)	Report	Řezník 79'	Stadium: Eden Arena; Attendance: 11,752; Referee: Miroslav Zelinka
	Penalties
	Vácha (penalty scored); Švejdík (penalty missed); Hušbauer (penalty scored); Bednář (penalty scored); Lafata (penalty scored); Holek (penalty scored); Krejčí (penalty scored); Mareček (penalty missed); Přikryl (penalty scored); Kadeřábek (penalty scored)		(penalty missed) Procházka; (penalty scored) Hořava; (penalty scored) Wágner; (penalty scored) Horváth; (penalty scored) Kolář; (penalty scored) Limberský; (penalty scored) Řezník; (penalty missed) Hubník; (penalty scored) Hejda; (penalty missed) Petržela

== Bracket ==
Fourth round
1	(1) Viktoria Plzeň	3	4	7
16	(3) Jiskra Domažlice	0	0	0
8	(1) Sigma Olomouc	0	0	0
9	(1) Vysočina Jihlava	4	0	4
5	(2) Varnsdorf	0	0	0
12	(1) Slavia Prague	0	1	1
4	(2) Viktoria Žižkov	1	0	1
13	(1) Zbrojovka Brno	0	4	4
6	(1) Jablonec	1	2	3
11	(2) Ústí nad Labem	0	0	0
3	(1) Mladá Boleslav	1	2	3
14	(1) Slovácko	0	0	0
7	(1) Dukla Prague	4	2	6
10	(1) Příbram	0	1	1
2	(1) Znojmo	2	1	3
15	(1) Sparta Prague	3	2	5

Quarter-finals
(1) Viktoria Plzeň (a)	1	2	3
(1) Vysočina Jihlava	0	3	3
(1) Slavia Prague	0	1	1 (4)
(1) Zbrojovka Brno	1	0	1 (5)
(1) Jablonec	2	0	2
(1) Mladá Boleslav	0	1	1
(1) Dukla Prague	2	0	2
(1) Sparta Prague	1	2	3

Semi-finals
(1) Viktoria Plzeň	2	0	2
(1) Zbrojovka Brno	0	0	0
(1) Jablonec	3	0	3
(1) Sparta Prague	1	4	5

Final
Viktoria Plzeň	1 (7)
Sparta Prague	1 (8)

== See also ==
- 2013–14 Czech First League
- 2013–14 Czech National Football League
