= 2011–12 Czech Cup =

Pohár ČMFS
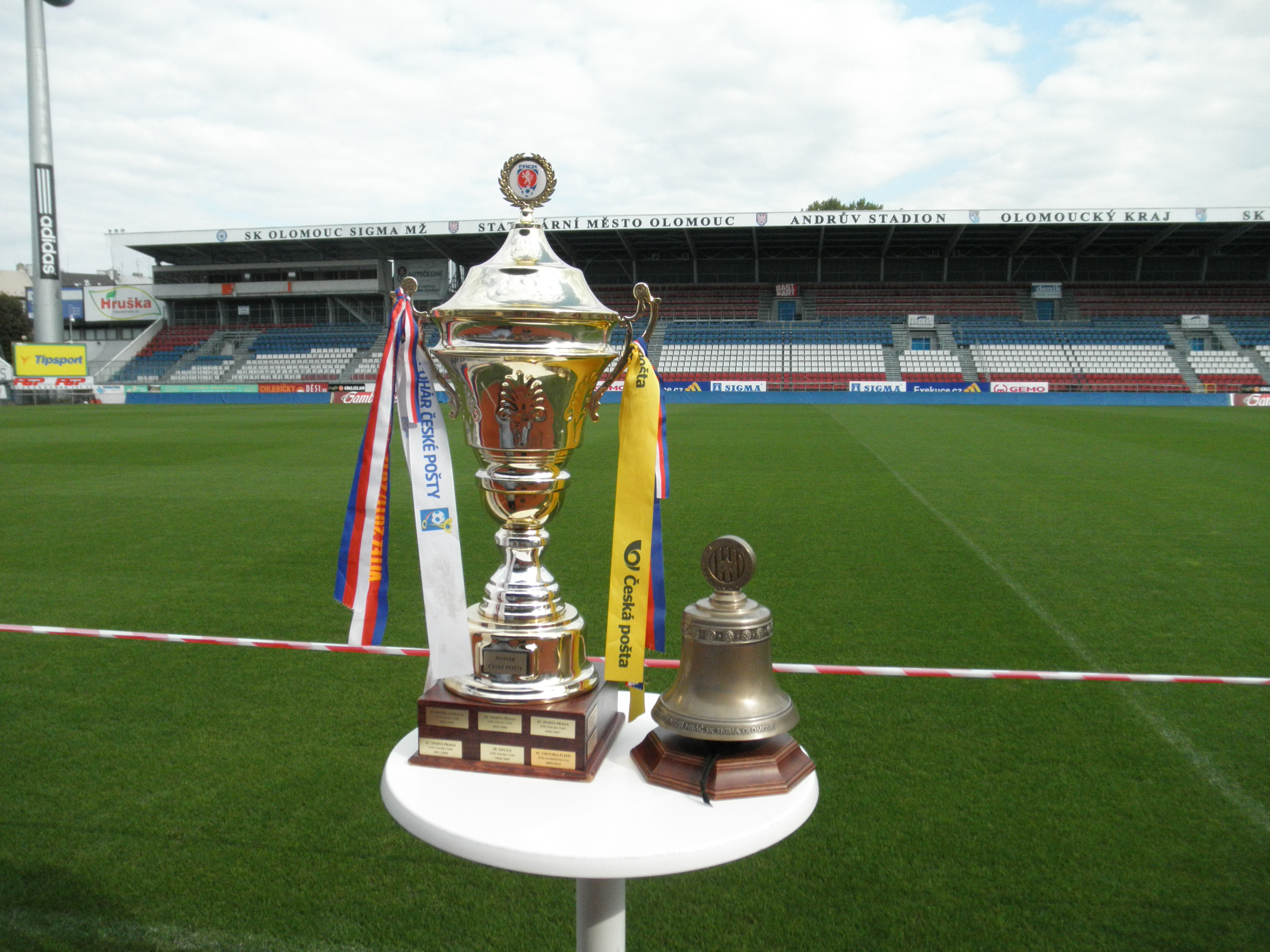
- Czech Cup at the Andrův stadion

Tournament details
- Country: Czech Republic
- Teams: 126

Final positions
- Champions: SK Sigma Olomouc
- Runners-up: AC Sparta Prague

Tournament statistics
- Top goal scorer(s): Alexander Jakubov; Jan Chramosta (5 goals)

The 2011–12 Czech Cup was the 19th edition of the annual football knockout tournament organized by the Czech Football Association of the Czech Republic. The draw for the whole competition was made on 8 July 2011. It began on 24 July 2011 with the preliminary round and was due to conclude with the final on 16 May 2012, but the Czech Republic's qualification for UEFA Euro 2012, the final brought forward the close to 2 May 2012. The winners of the competition qualified for the third qualifying round of the 2012–13 UEFA Europa League.

== Teams ==
Round	Clubs remaining	Clubs involved	Winners from previous round	New entries this round	Leagues entering at this round
Preliminary round	126	28	none	28	Levels 4 and 5 in football league pyramid
First round	112	96	14	82	Czech 2. Liga; Bohemian Football League; Moravian-Silesian Football League; Czech Fourth Division
Second round	64	64	48	16	Czech First League
Third round	32	32	32	none	none
Fourth round	16	16	16	none	none
Quarter finals	8	8	8	none	none
Semi finals	4	4	4	none	none
Final	2	2	2	none	none

== Preliminary round ==
The Preliminary round was played on 24 July 2011.

Team 1	Score	Team 2
VTJ Rapid Liberec	1–3	FK Jiskra Mšeno
Jaroměř	1–3	Dvůr Králové
MARINER Bavorovice	1–4	FK Tábor
Ústí n.Orlicí	0–1	1.FK Nová Paka
FK Nejdek	3–6	FK Slavoj Žatec
Čechie Uhříněves	1–2	SK Zápy
SK Hřebeč	2–6	Admira Prague
FC Spartak Chrást	0–5	Slavoj Koloveč
FK Lovochemie Lovosice	0–3	FK SIAD Souš
SK Převýšov	2–1	FK Trutnov
SK Union Čelákovice	2–1	FK Pěnčín-Turnov
Štěchovice	1–2	FK Slavoj Vyšehrad
SK Benešov	5–2	Polepy
Polná	4–0	Velké Meziříčí

== First round ==
The First round was played on the weekend of 30 and 31 July 2011.

Team 1	Score	Team 2
FK Jiskra Mšeno	0–2	SK Hlavice
Dvůr Králové	2–3	FK OEZ Letohrad
FK Tábor	0–2	FC Písek
1.FK Nová Paka	3–2	FC Velim
FK Slavoj Žatec	1–2	1. FC Karlovy Vary
SK Zápy	1–3	Sokol Ovčáry
Admira Prague	0–0; 4–2 pen	SK Kladno
Slavoj Koloveč	2–3	Jiskra Domažlice
FK SIAD Souš	0–5	FK Baník Sokolov
SK Převýšov	2–0	Arsenal Česká Lípa
SK Union Čelákovice	0–7	Kunice
FK Slavoj Vyšehrad	2–1	FK Hořovicko
SK Benešov	1–4	FK Sp. MAS Sezimovo Ústí
FC Hlinsko	1–5	FK Pardubice
FK Náchod	0–4	MFK Chrudim
Sokol Brozany	2–1	FK Baník Most
SK Vilémov	0–6	FK Ústí n.Labem
FC Český Dub	0–4	FK Varnsdorf
RMSK Nový Bydžov	2–2; 3–1 pen	FK Čáslav
SK Strakonice 1908	0–5	Vlašim
SK Roudnice n.Labem	1–0	FK Bohemians Prague
FC Přední Kopanina	1–2	FK Králův Dvůr
FK Meteor Prague	2–1	FC Chomutov
Litol	0–5	Loko Vltavín
FK Kolín	2–1	SK Marila Votice
Polná	3–0	Pelhřimov
Heřmanice	1–1; 7–6 pen	Lískovec
Nový Jičín	2–5	Frýdek Místek
Náměšť	0–2	Šumperk
Havířov	1–2	MFK OKD Karviná
Brumov	1–1; 3–1 pen	FC Tescoma Zlín
Sparta Brno	1–2	FC Zbrojovka Brno
Vyškov	1–1; 13–12 pen	Zábřeh
Tasovice	3–1	Líšeň
Žďár n.Sázavou	2–3	1.SC Znojmo FK
Třebíč	1–3	Rosice
Mikulovice	2–0	FC Hlučín
Dolní Benešov	1–0	Orlová
Mohelnice	0–2	Uničov
Petrovice	0–1	SFC Opava
Vrchovina	0–5	FC Vysočina Jihlava
Bystrc	2–1	Břeclav
Otrokovice	1–8	1. HFK Olomouc
Hodonín	0–3	SK HS Kroměříž
Slavičín	1–4	FK Fotbal Třinec
Spytihněv	2–1	Valašské Meziříčí
Přerov	1–3	Hulín
Bořetice	2–2; 4–3 pen	Brno Bohunice

== Second round ==
Teams from the Czech First League entered at this stage. The second round was played on 10 August 2011.

Team 1	Score	Team 2
1. FC Karlovy Vary	1–4	FC Viktoria Plzeň
Admira Prague	1–3	FK Baník Sokolov
Polná	0–4	FC Zbrojovka Brno
MFK Chrudim	0–3	FK Mladá Boleslav
Bystrc	1–1; 0–2 pen	1.SC Znojmo FK
1.FK Nová Paka	0–7	Bohemians 1905
Jiskra Domažlice	1–7	AC Sparta Prague
FK Pardubice	1–0	FK OEZ Letohrad
FK Kolín	2–2; 6–7 pen	FK Králův Dvůr
Vlašim	0–3	SK D.Č.Budějovice
Sokol Ovčáry	4–1	SK Hlavice
FC Písek	2–3	FK Viktoria Žižkov
RMSK Nový Bydžov	1–4	Kunice
SK Roudnice n.Labem	0–8	FK Baumit Jablonec
Tasovice	7–3	Rosice
Sokol Brozany	0–1	FK Dukla Prague
Bořetice	1–4	SK HS Kroměříž
FK Sp. MAS Sezimovo Ústí	3–1	1. FK Příbram
Spytihněv	2–3	SK Sigma Olomouc
Hulín	0–3	FC Vysočina Jihlava
Heřmanice	0–2	1. FC Slovácko
Broumov	1–2	Frýdek Místek
Šumperk	3–0	Vyškov
Uničov	0–3	FC Baník Ostrava
Mikulovice	4–0	Dolní Benešov
FK Ústí n.Labem	0–2	FK Teplice
1. HFK Olomouc	2–2; 2–4 pen	MFK OKD Karviná
SFC Opava	2–2; 3–2 pen	FK Fotbal Třinec
FK Varnsdorf	0–4	FC Slovan Liberec
Loko Vltavín	1–2	FC Hradec Králové
FK Slavoj Vyšehrad	1–3	SK Převýšov
FK Meteor Prague	1–6	SK Slavia Prague

== Third round ==
The third round was played on 31 August 2011.

Team 1	Score	Team 2
FK Baník Sokolov	1–3	FC Viktoria Plzeň
FC Zbrojovka Brno	1–3	FK Mladá Boleslav
1.SC Znojmo FK	2–1	Bohemians 1905
FK Pardubice	1–3	AC Sparta Prague
FK Králův Dvůr	0–2	SK D.Č.Budějovice
Sokol Ovčáry	0–2	FK Viktoria Žižkov
Kunice	4−6	FK Baumit Jablonec
Tasovice	0–4	FK Dukla Prague
SK HS Kroměříž	1–3	FK Sp. MAS Sezimovo Ústí
FC Vysočina Jihlava	1–2	SK Sigma Olomouc
Frýdek Místek	0–2	1. FC Slovácko
Šumperk	0–2	FC Baník Ostrava
Mikulovice	0–4	FK Teplice
MFK OKD Karviná	4–1	SFC Opava
FC Slovan Liberec	3–1	FC Hradec Králové
SK Převýšov	3–0	SK Slavia Prague

== Fourth round ==
The fourth round was played on 21 September and 19 October 2011.

Team 1	Agg.	Team 2	1st leg	2nd leg
FC Viktoria Plzeň	1−3	FK Mladá Boleslav	1−1	0−2
1.SC Znojmo FK	1−7	AC Sparta Prague	1−4	0−3
SK D.Č.Budějovice	2−1	FK Viktoria Žižkov	1−0	1−1
FK Baumit Jablonec	3−3 (a)	FK Dukla Prague	1−0	2−3
FK Sp. MAS Sezimovo Ústí	1−5	SK Sigma Olomouc	1−4	0−1
1. FC Slovácko	1−1 (a)	FC Baník Ostrava	1−1	0−0
FK Teplice	4−1	MFK OKD Karviná	1−0	3−1
SK Převýšov	2−6	FC Slovan Liberec	1−4	1−2

== Quarter-finals ==
The quarter-finals were played on 21 and 28 March 2012.

Team 1	Agg.	Team 2	1st leg	2nd leg
FK Mladá Boleslav	1–2	AC Sparta Prague	1–1	0–1
SK D.Č.Budějovice	0–5	FK Baumit Jablonec	0–0	0–5
SK Sigma Olomouc	4–2	FC Baník Ostrava	2–1	2–1
FK Teplice	3–1	FC Slovan Liberec	1–1	2–0

=== First leg ===
21 March 2012	FK Mladá Boleslav	1–1	AC Sparta Prague	Mladá Boleslav
16:00	Janíček 17'		Přikryl 21'	Stadium: Městský stadion Attendance: 3,786; Referee: Jaroslav Bílek

21 March 2012	SK České Budějovice	0–0	FK Baumit Jablonec	České Budějovice
16:30				Stadium: Stadion Střelecký ostrov Attendance: 743; Referee: Karel Hrubeš

21 March 2012	SK Sigma Olomouc	2–1	FC Baník Ostrava	Olomouc
17:30	Tomeček 21'; Jirouš 52' (pen.)		Fantiš 64'	Stadium: Andrův stadion Attendance: 3,811; Referee: Tomáš Adámek

21 March 2012	FK Teplice	1–1	FC Slovan Liberec	Teplice
18:00	Jindráček 73'		Šural 75'	Stadium: Na Stínadlech; Attendance: 2,013; Referee: Zbyněk Proske

=== Second leg ===
28 March 2012	FC Slovan Liberec	0–2 (1–3 agg.)	FK Teplice	Liberec
15:30			Lukáš 14'; Jindráček 83'	Stadium: Stadion u Nisy; Attendance: 2,860; Referee: Ondřej Lerch

28 March 2012	FC Baník Ostrava	1–2 (2–4 agg.)	SK Sigma Olomouc	Ostrava
17:30	Fantiš 73'		Klesnil 3'; Ordoš 90+1'	Stadium: Bazaly; Attendance: 2,236; Referee: Jan Paták

28 March 2012	AC Sparta Prague	1–0 (2–1 agg.)	FK Mladá Boleslav	Prague
18:00	Hušbauer 66'			Stadium: Generali Arena; Attendance: 3,012; Referee: Tomáš Adámek

29 March 2012	FK Baumit Jablonec	5–0 (5–0 agg.)	SK České Budějovice	Jablonec nad Nisou
16:30	Pavlík 17'; Eliáš 32'; Lafata 40' (pen.); Piták 57'; Třešňák 75'			Stadium: Chance Arena; Attendance: 1,235; Referee: Drahoslav Drábek

== Semi-finals ==
The semi finals were played on 11 and 18 April 2012.

Team 1	Agg.	Team 2	1st leg	2nd leg
AC Sparta Prague	4–2	FK Baumit Jablonec	1–0	3–2
SK Sigma Olomouc	3–0	FK Teplice	0–0	3–0

=== First leg ===
11 April 2012	SK Sigma Olomouc	0–0	FK Teplice	Olomouc
16:00				Stadium: Andrův stadion Attendance: 2,305; Referee: Radek Matějek

11 April 2012	AC Sparta Prague	1–0	FK Baumit Jablonec	Prague
20:15	Krejčí 17'			Stadium: Generali Arena; Attendance: 2,603; Referee: Pavel Královec

=== Second leg ===
18 April 2012	FK Baumit Jablonec	2–3 (2–4 agg.)	AC Sparta Prague	Jablonec nad Nisou
16:00	Lafata 17'; Beneš 73'		Hušbauer 82', 87'; Brabec 16'	Stadium: Chance Arena; Attendance: 3,120; Referee: Radek Příhoda

19 April 2012	FK Teplice	0–3 (0–3 agg.)	SK Sigma Olomouc	Teplice
16:00			Ordoš 38', 64'; Siva 45' (o.g.)	Stadium: Na Stínadlech; Attendance: 2,650; Referee: Jiří Jech

== Final ==
The final was held on 2 May 2012 at Stadion města Plzně.

2 May 2012	AC Sparta Prague	0–1	SK Sigma Olomouc	Plzeň
19:15			Vepřek 46'	Stadium: Stadion města Plzně; Attendance: 7,231; Referee: Michal Paták

== See also ==
- 2011–12 Czech First League
- 2011–12 Czech 2. Liga
