= 2004–05 Czech Cup =

Pohár ČMFS

Tournament details
- Country: Czech Republic
- Teams: 125

Final positions
- Champions: Baník Ostrava
- Runners-up: Slovácko

The 2004–05 Czech Cup was the 12th edition of the annual football knockout tournament organized by the Czech Football Association of the Czech Republic.

FC Baník Ostrava prevailed in Andrův stadion, Olomouc at the 31 May 2005 Cup defeating 1. FC Slovácko, 2–1. 11,251 in attendance. Baník Ostrava qualified for the 2005–06 UEFA Cup.

== Teams ==
| Round | Clubs remaining | Clubs involved | Winners from previous round | New entries this round | Leagues entering at this round |
|---|---|---|---|---|---|
| Preliminary round | 125 | 26 | none | 26 | Levels 4 and 5 in football league pyramid |
| First round | 112 | 96 | 13 | 83 | Czech 2. Liga; Bohemian Football League; Moravian-Silesian Football League; Czech Fourth Division |
| Second round | 64 | 64 | 48 | 16 | Czech First League |
| Third round | 32 | 32 | 32 | none | none |
| Fourth round | 16 | 16 | 16 | none | none |
| Quarter finals | 8 | 8 | 8 | none | none |
| Semi finals | 4 | 4 | 4 | none | none |
| Final | 2 | 2 | 2 | none | none |

== Preliminary round ==
The preliminary round was played on 25 July 2004.

| Team 1 | Score | Team 2 |
|---|---|---|
| FC Zličín | 2–0 | Králův Dvůr |
| Kácov | 2–3 | Benešov |
| Hrdějovice | 0–3 | Třeboň |
| Sokol Teplá | 0–7 | Vejprnice |
| SIAD Souš | 1–1; 8-9 pen | SK Rakovník |
| Skuteč | 1–2 | Choceň |
| Trutnov | 2–2; 5-6 pen | Týniště nad Orlicí |
| TJ Valy | 0–6 | Loko Pardubice |
| SK Skalice | 0–0; 4-5 pen | Český Dub |
| Velká nad Veličkou | 3–1 | Kyjov |
| Provodov | 0–2 | Slavičín |
| Vidnava | 1–1; 11-10 pen | Mikulovice |
| Stěbořice | 0–3 | Jakubčovice |

== Round 1 ==
The first round was played on 31 July 2004.

| Team 1 | Score | Team 2 |
|---|---|---|
| FC Zličín | 0–2 | Sparta Krč |
| Motorlet Prague | 1–2 | SK Kladno |
| Lokomotiva Praha-Vltavín | 2–2; 4-5 pen | FK Kolín |
| Hořovice | 0–6 | Viktoria Žižkov |
| Benešov | 1–1; 3-4 pen | Sezimovo Ústí |
| Vyšehrad | 1–3 | Xaverov |
| Dobrovice | 1–1; 5-4 pen | Střížkov |
| Čelákovice | 0–0; 4-5 pen | Břevnov |
| Český Brod | 2–1 | Bohemians Prague |
| Třeboň | 1–1; 3-1 pen | Strakonice |
| Tábor | 1–4 | Prachatice |
| Chanovice | 0–7 | Klatovy |
| Doubravka | 0–4 | Karlovy Vary-Dvory |
| Vejprnice | 4–0 | Trstěnice |
| SK Rakovník | 0–3 | Viktoria Plzeň |
| Neštěmice | 2–1 | Chomutov |
| Roudnice nad Labem | 0–4 | Siad Most |
| Litvínov | 1–2 | Varnsdorf |
| Český Dub | 1–0 | Semily |
| Česká Lípa | 1–0 | Nový Bor |
| Týniště nad Orlicí | 3–5 | Náchod-Deštné |
| Dvůr Králové | 1–1; 4-2 pen | Velim |
| Loko Pardubice | 2–3 | Ovčáry |
| Ústí nad Orlicí | 1–3 | AS Pardubice |
| Chrudim | 2–4 | Hradec Králové |
| Choceň | 0–2 | Letohrad |
| Velké Meziříčí | 5–1 | Žďár nad Sázavou |
| Ždírec nad Doubravou | 0–5 | Jihlava |
| Hrušovany nad Jevišovkou | 1–0 | Znojmo |
| Třebíč | 0–2 | Bystrc-Kníničky |
| Vyškov | 1–3 | Brno Kohoutovice |
| Velká nad Veličkou | 2–4 | Kunovice |
| Slavičín | 3–0 | Kroměříž |
| Rousínov | 1–2 | Mutěnice |
| Břeclav | 0–0; 1-4 pen | Poštorná |
| Velké Karlovice | 0–2 | 1. Valašský FC |
| Bystřice pod Hostýnem | 2–1 | Vítkovice |
| Horka nad Moravou | 2–1 | LeRK Prostějov |
| Králová | 0–6 | HFK Olomouc |
| Velké Losiny | 1–5 | Uničov |
| Zábřeh | 2–0 | Lipová |
| Lipník | 2–3 | Hranice |
| Vidnava | 1–6 | Město Albrechtice |
| Jakubčovice | 1–3 | Dolní Benešov |
| Karviná | 3–3; 5-4 pen | Baník Albrechtice |
| Český Těšín | 3–0 | Frýdek-Místek |
| Dětmarovice | 1–0 | Třinec |
| Orlová | 1–3 | Hlučín |

== Round 2 ==
The second round was played on 22 September 2004.

| Team 1 | Score | Team 2 |
|---|---|---|
| Karviná | 0–4 | Baník Ostrava |
| Dětmarovice | 1–1; 4-2 pen | Bystřice pod Hostýnem |
| Brno Kohoutovice | 0–4 | FK Drnovice |
| Horka n. Moravou | 1–3 | Uničov |
| 1. Valašský FC | 1–6 | 1. FC Slovácko |
| Mutěnice | 1–1; 5-4 pen | Poštorná |
| Dolní Benešov | 0–6 | SFC Opava |
| Město Albrechtice | 0–3 | Hlučín |
| Český Dub | 0–2 | FK Jablonec 97 |
| Sparta Krč | 0–0; 5-4 pen | Viktoria Žižkov |
| Třeboň | 1–4 | České Budějovice |
| Sezimovo Ústí | 0–2 | Prachatice |
| Viktoria Plzeň | 1–0 | Chmel Blšany |
| Vejprnice | 1–2 | Karlovy Vary-Dvory |
| Hranice | 0–0; 4-3 pen | SK Sigma Olomouc |
| Zábřeh | 0–2 | HFK Olomouc |
| Bystrc-Kníničky | 0–3 | Slavia Prague |
| Velké Meziříčí | 1–6 | Jihlava |
| Hrušovany | 1–4 | 1. FC Brno |
| Slavičín | 2–2; 6-5 pen | Kunovice |
| Český Těšín | 1–4 | Tescoma Zlín |
| Letohrad | 0–2 | Hradec Králové |
| Xaverov | 1–4 | FK Teplice |
| Česká Lípa | 1–4 | Náchod-Deštné |
| Dvůr Králové | 0–5 | Slovan Liberec |
| Ovčáry | 0–1 | AS Pardubice |
| Klatovy | 1–2 | Marila Příbram |
| Kolín | 1–1; 2-4 pen | SK Kladno |
| Dobrovice | 0–2 | FK Mladá Boleslav |
| Český Brod | 1–1; 3-4 pen | Břevnov |
| Varnsdorf | 1–2 | Siad Most |
| Neštěmice | 1–2 | Sparta Prague |

== Round 3 ==
The third round was played on 6 October 2004.

| Team 1 | Score | Team 2 |
|---|---|---|
| Dětmarovice | 1–2 | Baník Ostrava |
| Uničov | 2–1 | FK Drnovice |
| Mutěnice | 1–6 | 1. FC Slovácko |
| Hlučín | 1–0 | SFC Opava |
| Sparta Krč | 0–1 | Jablonec |
| Prachatice | 1–2 | České Budějovice |
| Karlovy Vary-Dvory | 0–3 | Viktoria Plzeň |
| HFK Olomouc | 0–0; 5-3 pen | Hranice |
| Jihlava | 0–2 | Slavia Prague |
| Slavičín | 0–0; 8-7 pen | Brno |
| Hradec Králové | 0–2 | Zlín |
| Náchod-Deštné | 1–1; 3-4 pen | FK Teplice |
| Pardubice | 0–3 | Slovan Liberec |
| SK Kladno | 1–1; 3-2 pen | Marila Příbram |
| Břevnov | 0–2 | Mladá Boleslav |
| Siad Most | 1–1; 5-4 pen | Sparta Prague |

== Round 4 ==
The fourth round was played on 27 October 2004.

| Team 1 | Score | Team 2 |
|---|---|---|
| Uničov | 0–1 | Baník Ostrava |
| Hlučín | 1–1; 1-4 pen | 1. FC Slovácko |
| České Budějovice | 1–2 | Jablonec |
| HFK Olomouc | 0–1 | Viktoria Plzeň |
| Slavičín | 0–6 | Slavia Prague |
| Tescoma Zlín | 1–2 | FK Teplice |
| SK Kladno | 0–1 | Slovan Liberec |
| Most | 1–0 | Mladá Boleslav |

== Quarterfinals ==
The quarterfinals were played between 20 and 26 April 2005.

| Team 1 | Score | Team 2 |
|---|---|---|
| 1. FC Slovácko | 0–0; 9-8 pen | FK Teplice |
| FC Viktoria Plzeň | 1–1; 4-3 pen | FK Siad Most |
| FC Slovan Liberec | 4–1 | FK Jablonec 97 |
| FC Baník Ostrava | 5–1 | SK Slavia Prague |

== Semifinals ==
The semifinals were played on 11 and 12 May 2005.

| Team 1 | Score | Team 2 |
|---|---|---|
| FC Slovan Liberec | 2–2; 2-3 pen | 1. FC Slovácko |
| FC Viktoria Plzeň | 0–0; 0-3 pen | FC Baník Ostrava |

== Final ==
31 May 2005
18:00 CEST

| FC Baník Ostrava | 2–1 | 1. FC Slovácko |
|---|---|---|
| Metelka 54'; Papadopulos 88' | | 90' Dostálek |

Andrův stadion, Olomouc
Attendance: 11,251
Referee: Milan Šedivý

== See also ==
- 2004–05 Czech First League
- 2004–05 Czech 2. Liga
