= 2005–06 Czech Cup =

Pohár ČMFS

Tournament details
- Country: Czech Republic
- Teams: 131

Final positions
- Champions: Sparta Prague
- Runners-up: Baník Ostrava

Tournament statistics
- Top goal scorer(s): Adam Varadi; Libor Došek (5 goals)

The 2005–06 Czech Cup was the 13th edition of the annual football knockout tournament organized by the Czech Football Association of the Czech Republic. It began on 24 July 2005 with the preliminary round and ended with the final on 19 May 2006.

AC Sparta Prague prevailed in Stadion u Nisy, Liberec at the 19 May 2006 Cup defeating FC Baník Ostrava, under a penalty score of 4–2.4,464 in attendance. AC Sparta Prague qualified for the 2006–07 UEFA Cup.

== Teams ==
Round	Clubs remaining	Clubs involved	Winners from previous round	New entries this round	Leagues entering at this round
Preliminary round	131	38	none	38	Levels 4 and 5 in football league pyramid
First round	112	96	19	77	Czech 2. Liga; Bohemian Football League; Moravian-Silesian Football League; Czech Fourth Division
Second round	64	64	48	16	Czech First League
Third round	32	32	32	none	none
Fourth round	16	16	16	none	none
Quarter finals	8	8	8	none	none
Semi finals	4	4	4	none	none
Final	2	2	2	none	none

== Preliminary round ==
The preliminary round took place on 24 July 2005.

Team 1	Score	Team 2
Bzová	0–5	Vejprnice
Horní Měcholupy	1–1; 3-4 pen	Velim
Admira/Slavoj	3–0^{1}	Český Brod
Rožmitál	0–0; 2-4 pen	Kácov
Vodňany	1–2	FK Tábor
ZČE Plzeň	2–3	Hořovice
Chodov u Karlových Varů	0–6	Doubravka
FK Brandov	2–1	Rakovník
Skalice u České Lípy	2–0	Libiš
Nový Bydžov	2–1	Choceň
Holice v Čechách	1–3	Ústí nad Orlicí
Slavoj Polná	1–1; 4-5 pen	Ždírec nad Doubravou
Pálava Mikulov	1–2	Hrušovany nad Jevišovkou
Ostrožská Nová Ves	2–1	Kyjov
Dolany	0–0; 3-4 pen	Horka
Slavia Stachovice	0–4	Fulnek
Morkovice	4–2	Vyškov
Konice	2–0	Velké Losiny
Baník Albrechtice	1–1; 3-2 pen	Dětmarovice

Notes: 1: match awarded to Admira/Slavoj.

== Round 1 ==
The first round was played on 31 July 2005.

Team 1	Score	Team 2
Hořovice	2–0	Vejprnice
Velim	0–4	Viktoria Žižkov
Admira/Slavoj	0–2	Xaverov H.Počernice
Kácov	1–3	Zenit Čáslav
FK Tábor	0–1	Tatran Prachatice
Doubravka	0–2	Karlovy Vary-Dvory
FK Brandov	0–3	Sokolov
Skalice u České Lípy	1–2	Varnsdorf
Nový Bydžov	2–1	Svitavy
Ústí nad Orlicí	0–3	AS Pardubice
Dvůr Králové	2–2; 3-2 pen	Týniště nad Orlicí
Předměřice	2–2; 5-6 pen	Náchod
Chrudim	1–5	Hradec Králové
Hlavice	0–3	Ústí nad Labem
Holýšov	1–0	Klatovy
Jankov	0–1	Strakonice
Benešov	0–2	Sezimovo Ústí
Stříbrná Skalice	1–1; 3-4 pen	Kolín
Třeboň	0–2	České Budějovice
Pěnčín-Turnov	1–0	Nový Bor
Tesla Pardubice	0–1	Letohrad
Motorlet	0–1	Litvínov
Králův Dvůr	2–1	Sparta Krč
Vyšehrad	1–1; 2-3 pen	Chomutov
Čelákovice	2–2; 4-3 pen	Bohemians 1905
Loko Vltavín	0–4	SK Kladno
Dobrovice	1–2	Břevnov
Ovčáry	1–3	Bohemians Prague
Velké Meziříčí	0–2	Bystrc
Ždírec nad Doubravou	1–0	Žďár nad Sázavou
Třebíč	2–2; 0-3 pen	Kohoutovice
Hrušovany nad Jevišovkou	1–2	Břeclav
Ostrožská Nová Ves	2–1	Poštorná (Šardice)
Rousínov	2–3	Znojmo
Slavičín	1–3	Kunovice
Mutěnice	0–0; 5-4 pen	FKD
Konice	3–3; 6-7 pen	Město Albrechtice
Morkovice	2–0	Lipová
Zábřeh	1–1; 4-2 pen	Uničov
Horka	0–6	HFK Olomouc
Hranice	1–1; 2-4 pen	Kroměříž
Velké Karlovice	4–0	Bystřice pod Hostýnem
Fulnek	0–3	Jakubčovice
Baník Albrechtice	0–4	Hlučín
Karviná	w/o	Opava
Frýdek-Místek	0–2	Vítkovice
Český Těšín	1–1; 6-7 pen	Fotbal Třinec
Orlová	1–4	Dolní Benešov

== Round 2 ==
The second round was played on 31 August 2005.

Team 1	Score	Team 2
Zenit Čáslav	0–6	Sparta Prague
Litvínov	2–0	Chomutov
SK Kladno	2–1	Siad Most
Varnsdorf	2–1	Xaverov
Pěnčín-Turnov	0–3	Slovan Liberec
Nový Bydžov	0–1	Viktoria Žižkov
Karlovy Vary-Dvory	0–2	Chmel Blšany
Holýšov	0–3	Strakonice
Velké Karlovice	2–2; 4-5 pen	Tescoma Zlín
Znojmo	0–2	Kunovice
Tatran Prachatice	2–1	Viktoria Plzeň
Králův Dvůr	1–4	České Budějovice
Břeclav	0–1	Slovácko
Morkovice	1–1; 5-6 pen	Mutěnice
Sokolov	0–5	Teplice
Hořovice	2–2; 2-4 pen	Čelákovice
HFK Olomouc	1–1; 4-1 pen	Sigma Olomouc
Zábřeh	0–0; 7-8 pen	Kroměříž
Náchod	2–0	Mladá Boleslav
Letohrad	1–1; 5-6 pen	Hradec Králové
Třinec	1–1; 4-5 pen	Baník Ostrava
Karviná	0–1	Jakubčovice
Sezimovo Ústí	3–6	Marila Příbram
Kolín	4–1	Břevnov
Ústí nad Labem	2–1	Jablonec 97
Bohemians Prague	1–2	AS Pardubice
Ostrožská Nová Ves	0–8	Brno
Kohoutovice	0–1	Bystrc
Ždírec n Doubravou	0–3	Vysočina Jihlava
Dolní Benešov	0–1	Vítkovice
Město Albrechtice	0–3	Hlučín
Dvůr Králové	0–3	Slavia Prague

== Round 3 ==
The third round was played on 21 September 2005.

Team 1	Score	Team 2
Litvínov	1–7	Sparta Prague
Varnsdorf	0–1	SK Kladno
Viktoria Žižkov	4–3	Slovan Liberec
Strakonice	1–3	Chmel Blšany
Kunovice	2–1	Tescoma Zlín
Tatran Prachatice	1–2	České Budějovice
Mutěnice	1–2	Slovácko
Čelákovice	0–5	Teplice
HFK Olomouc	0–0; 5-4 pen	Kroměříž
Náchod	2–3	Hradec Králové
Jakubčovice	0–1	Baník Ostrava
Kolín	0–2	Marila Příbram
AS Pardubice	0–1	Ústí nad Labem
Bystrc	0–1	Brno
Vítkovice	2–0	Vysočina Jihlava
Hlučín	0–4	Slavia Prague

== Round 4 ==
The fourth round was played on 26 October 2005.

Team 1	Score	Team 2
SK Kladno	0–2	Sparta Prague
Viktoria Žižkov	2–2; 6-5 pen	Chmel Blšany
Kunovice	1–0	České Budějovice
Slovácko	2–0	FK Teplice
Hradec Králové	2–1	HFK Olomouc
Marila Příbram	1–2	Baník Ostrava
Ústí nad Labem	0–1	Brno
Vítkovice	0–1	Slavia Prague

== Quarterfinals ==
The quarterfinals were played between 12 and 19 April 2006.

Team 1	Score	Team 2
AC Sparta Prague	2–0	FK Viktoria Žižkov
1. FC Slovácko	0–0; 1-4 pen	1. FC Brno
FK Kunovice	0–2	FC Baník Ostrava
FC Hradec Králové	2–0	SK Slavia Prague

== Semifinals ==
The semifinals were played on 16 May 2006.

Team 1	Score	Team 2
AC Sparta Prague	2–0	1. FC Brno
FC Baník Ostrava	2–0	FC Hradec Králové

== Final ==
19 May 2006
17:00 CEST

AC Sparta Prague	0–0	FC Baník Ostrava
Penalties
Kadlec (penalty scored); Matušovič (penalty scored); Sivok (penalty scored); Kóňa (penalty missed); Herzán (penalty scored)	4–2	(penalty scored) Besta; (penalty scored) Klimpl; (penalty missed) Slončík; (penalty missed) Magera

Stadion u Nisy, Liberec
Attendance: 4,464
Referee: Dagmar Damková

== See also ==
- 2005–06 Czech First League
- 2005–06 Czech 2. Liga
