= Zdeněk Zlámal =

Czech footballer (born 1985)

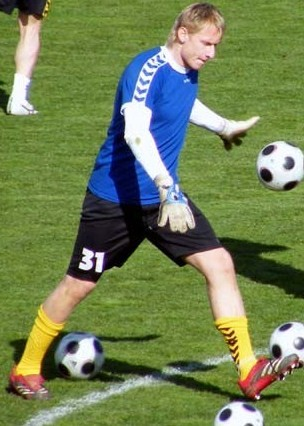
- Zlámal in 2009

Personal information
- Date of birth: 5 November 1985 (age 41)
- Place of birth: Přerov, Czechoslovakia
- Height: 1.93 m (6 ft 4 in)
- Position: Goalkeeper

Youth career
- 1990–2002: Spartak Hulín

Senior career*
Years	Team	Apps	(Gls)
2002–2004	Spartak Hulín		
2004–2005	Hanácká Slavia Kroměříž	36	(0)
2006	Sparta Prague	0	(0)
2006–2007	→ Tescoma Zlín (loan)	19	(0)
2007–2009	Slovan Liberec	44	(0)
2009–2011	Udinese	0	(0)
2009–2010	→ Cádiz CF (loan)	2	(0)
2010–2011	→ Slavia Prague (loan)	9	(0)
2011–2012	Bari	0	(0)
2011–2012	→ Sigma Olomouc (loan)	25	(0)
2012–2014	Sigma Olomouc	39	(0)
2014–2016	Bohemians	41	(1)
2016–2017	Alanyaspor	10	(0)
2017–2018	Fastav Zlín	10	(0)
2018–2021	Heart of Midlothian	36	(0)
2020	→ St Mirren (loan)	3	(0)
2021	→ St Johnstone (loan)	1	(0)

International career
2006–2007	Czech Republic U-21	9	(0)
2009	Czech Republic	1	(0)
- * Club domestic league appearances and goals

Zdeněk Zlámal (born 5 November 1985) is a Czech retired professional footballer who played as a goalkeeper. After he ended his professional career in 2021, he plays as an outfield player on amateur level.

He has previously played for Spartak Hulín, Hanácká Slavia Kroměříž, Sparta Prague, Zlín, Slovan Liberec, Udinese, Cádiz CF, Slavia Prague, Bari, Sigma Olomouc, Bohemians, Alanyaspor, Heart of Midlothian, St Mirren and St Johnstone.

Zlámal is a Czech Republic international, having been capped once in 2009.

== Club career ==
=== Early career ===
Zlámal began his career with Spartak Hulín at the age of 5. He first started as a goalkeeper for Spartak Hulín when he was 16, he debuted on 14 July 2002 in the Czech Cup game against FC Morkovice. In the 82nd minute he remained unconscious after a collision with an opponent, and was sent to the local hospital. For the 2004–05 season, Zlámal moved to the Czech second division, to play for Hanácká Slavia Kroměříž, where he was immediately a starting player.

After 36 starts in the Czech second division Zlámal signed with a team from Czech First League, FC Slovan Liberec. Despite his signing of the contract with Slovan Liberec, Zlámal agreed on a contract with Czech champion Sparta Prague. The young goalkeeper had to pay a fine for breaking his contract, but in January 2006 Zlámal was finally in Prague ready to play for Sparta. Unfortunately, number one goalkeeper at Sparta Prague was experienced Jaromír Blažek that time. Zlámal played just a couple of matches for the reserve team.

For the 2006–07 season, Zlámal was sent to FC Tescoma Zlín. The clubs agreed on a loan lasting one year. There Zlámal regularly started as the goalkeeper. In the summer of 2007, after the transfer of Blažek to Bundesliga team 1. FC Nürnberg, Zlámal was sent back to Sparta Prague, although in August, just one month later, he was sold on to Slovan Liberec.

=== Udinese and loans ===
In August 2009, Zlámal signed a five-year contract with Italian club side Udinese Calcio. Zlámal was sent on a loan to Cádiz immediately after his transfer to Italy.

In September 2010, Zlámal moved on loan to Slavia Prague until the end of the 2010–11 season. In July 2011, Zlámal returned to Italy after two years out on loan, reportedly for a domestic loan to Bari.

=== Bari ===
On 13 July 2011, he was called up to Bari's pre-season camp and on 15 July Udinese confirmed Zlámal moved to Bari in co-ownership deal, which Fernando Forestieri also moved from the northern side to the south.

=== Heart of Midlothian ===
Zlámal signed a three-year contract with Scottish Premiership club Heart of Midlothian in May 2018.

On 12 September 2020, Zlámal signed for Scottish Premiership club St. Mirren on a seven-day emergency loan. He played in three matches during that week, as cover for two goalkeepers who had tested positive for COVID-19.

In May 2021, Zlámal signed for St Johnstone on an emergency loan, and was an unused substitute in the Scottish Cup semi-final on 8 May. Despite not being selected to start or sit on the bench for the final, Zlámal was part of the squad when the Saints won the Scottish Cup.

Zlámal was released from Hearts in May 2021 upon the expiry of his contract. In September 2021, Zlámal announced his retirement from football in an Instagram post.

=== FC Sigma Hodolany ===
In March 2024, Zlámal signed for Czech seventh tier side FC Sigma Hodolany. Signed as an outfield player, he scored a hat-trick in a 4–4 draw with FC Kralice na Hané.

== International career ==
Zlámal was a member of the Czech Republic U-21 team between 2006 and 2007. He was also part of the squad during the 2007 UEFA European Under-21 Football Championship.

Zlámal was nominated by the former Czech Republic national team coach František Straka for the international friendly match against Malta in May 2009.

== Honours ==
SK Sigma Olomouc

- Czech Cup: 2011–12
- Czech Supercup: 2012

St Johnstone

- Scottish Cup: 2020–21
