= Zdeněk Klesnil =

Czech footballer

Personal information
- Full name: Zdeněk Klesnil
- Date of birth: 28 October 1986 (age 40)
- Place of birth: Kroměříž, Czechoslovakia
- Height: 1.95 m (6 ft 5 in)
- Position: Striker

Team information
- Current team: Sigma Olomouc
- Number: 16

Youth career
- Hulín

Senior career*
Years	Team	Apps	(Gls)
2005–2007	Hulín		
- FC Viktorie Přerov
- TJ Sokol Němčice
2007–2010	Sigma Olomouc	1	(0)
2010–2011	Opava	12	(3)
2011–	Sigma Olomouc	13	(5)
- * Club domestic league appearances and goals as of 3 May 2012

Zdeněk Klesnil (born 28 October 1986 in Kroměříž) is a Czech football striker who currently plays for the Gambrinus liga club SK Sigma Olomouc.

== Honours ==
SK Sigma Olomouc

- Czech Cup: 2011–12
