= Tomáš Sivok =

Czech footballer (born 1983)

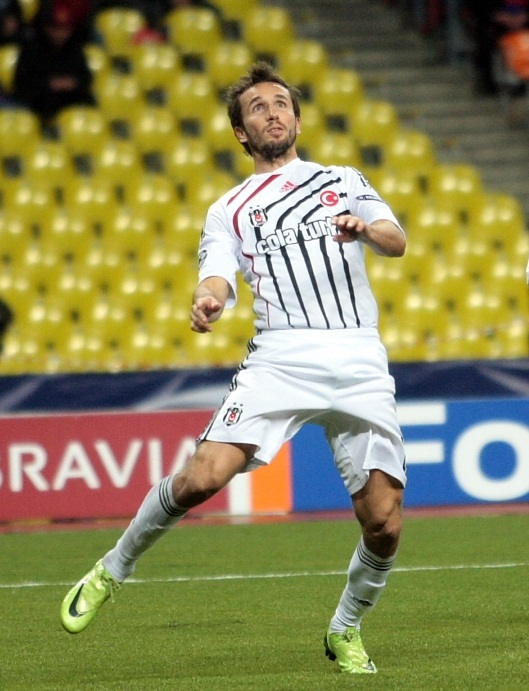
- Sivok in the 2009–10 season

Personal information
- Full name: Tomáš Sivok
- Date of birth: 15 September 1983 (age 43)
- Place of birth: Pelhřimov, Czechoslovakia
- Height: 1.85 m (6 ft 1 in)
- Positions: Centre-back; midfielder

Youth career
- České Budějovice

Senior career*
Years	Team	Apps	(Gls)
2000–2002	České Budějovice	31	(1)
2002–2007	Sparta Prague	95	(4)
2003	→ České Budějovice (loan)	13	(1)
2007–2008	Udinese	23	(1)
2008	→ Sparta Prague (loan)	25	(1)
2008–2015	Beşiktaş	156	(15)
2015–2017	Bursaspor	42	(2)
2017–2019	Maccabi Petah Tikva	57	(4)
2019–2020	České Budějovice	19	(1)
Total		499	(34)

International career
1998–1999	Czech Republic U15	9	(2)
1999–2000	Czech Republic U16	21	(2)
2000–2001	Czech Republic U17	7	(0)
2000	Czech Republic U18	1	(0)
2001–2002	Czech Republic U19	8	(1)
2003	Czech Republic U20	10	(2)
2002–2005	Czech Republic U21	13	(2)
2005–2017	Czech Republic	64	(5)
- * Club domestic league appearances and goals

Tomáš Sivok (born 15 September 1983) is a Czech former professional footballer who played as a centre-back or midfielder. He made 64 appearances for the Czech national team scoring 5 goals. At club level, Sivok is best known for a seven-year spell with Turkish club Beşiktaş, playing over 200 matches for them. He has also played abroad for Udinese in Italy, Bursaspor in Turkey and Maccabi Petah Tikva in Israel.

== Club career ==
In September 2005, Sivok became a captain of Sparta Prague.

In the middle of 2006, Sivok became a main face of a Czech government anti-racist campaign which is called Together Against The Racism.

He signed for Udinese during the January 2007 transfer window. In May 2008, he was sold by Udinese to the Turkish side Beşiktaş for €4.7 million. He signed a four-plus-one-year contract worth €800,000 per season and up to €100,000 in bonuses; his salary would have risen to €1.2 million if he had extended his contract to 2013.

Sivok joined Czech First League club Dynamo České Budějovice in 2019.

== International career ==
Sivok was captain of the Czech Republic U21 national team in 2006. He made his debut for the Czech national team on 3 September 2005.

== Personal life ==
Sivok married Michaela Šachlová on 9 March 2009 in Istanbul. Their first child is a son named André Thomas second child is girl Megan.

== Career statistics ==
=== Club ===
As of 30 May 2015

Appearances and goals by club, season and competition
Club	Season	League		Cup		Other		Europe		Total	
Club	Season	Apps	Goals	Apps	Goals	Apps	Goals	Apps	Goals	Apps	Goals
Beşiktaş	2008–09	29	2	6	0	0	0	3	0	38	2
Beşiktaş	2009–10	31	2	2	0	1	0	5	0	39	2
Beşiktaş	2010–11	11	0	5	2	0	0	5	0	21	2
Beşiktaş	2011–12	27	4	1	0	0	0	12	2	40	6
Beşiktaş	2012–13	28	5	1	0	0	0	0	0	29	5
Beşiktaş	2013–14	13	2	0	0	0	0	2	0	15	2
Beşiktaş	2014–15	17	0	0	0	0	0	4	0	21	0
Beşiktaş	Total	156	15	15	2	1	0	28	2	203	19
Career total		156	15	15	2	1	0	28	2	203	19

=== International ===
Scores and results list Czech Republic's goal tally first, score column indicates score after each Sivok goal.

List of international goals scored by Tomáš Sivok
No.	Date	Venue	Opponent	Score	Result	Competition
1	26 May 2010	Rentschler Field, Connecticut, United States	United States	1–1	4–2	Friendly
2	9 February 2011	Stadion Aldo Drosina, Pula, Croatia	Croatia	1–2	2–4	Friendly
3	11 November 2011	Generali Arena, Prague, Czech Republic	Montenegro	2–0	2–0	UEFA Euro 2012 qualifying
4	10 October 2014	Şükrü Saracoğlu Stadium, Istanbul, Turkey	Turkey	1–1	2–1	UEFA Euro 2016 qualifying
5	13 November 2015	Generali Arena, Prague, Czech Republic	Serbia	1–0	4–1	Friendly

== Honours ==
Sparta Prague

- Czech First League: 2002–03, 2004–05
- Czech Cup: 2004–05, 2005–06, 2007–08

Beşiktaş

- Süper Lig: 2008–09
- Turkish Cup: 2008–09, 2010–11
