= Vilémov (Děčín District) =

- Municipality
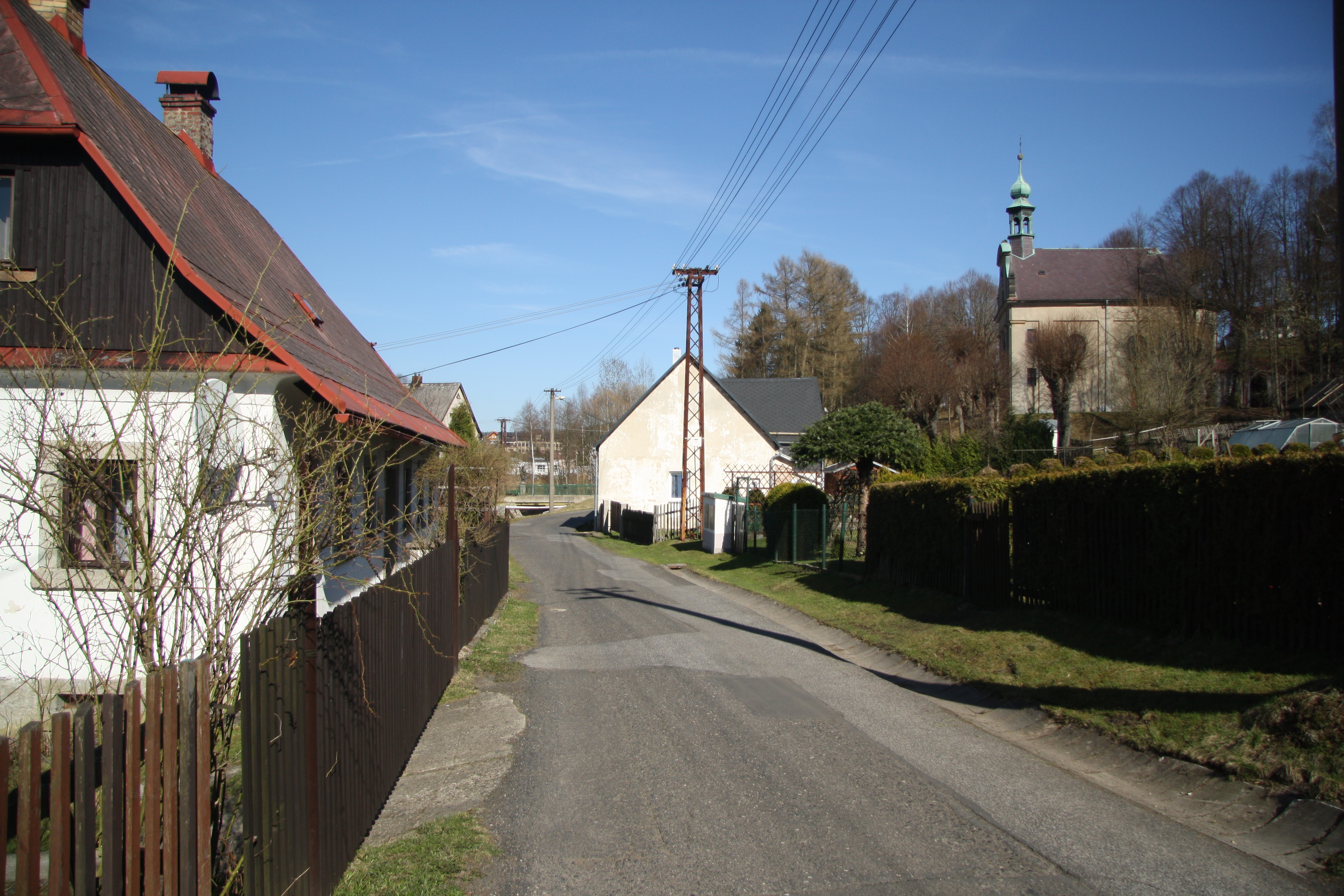
- Dolina, a part of Vilémov

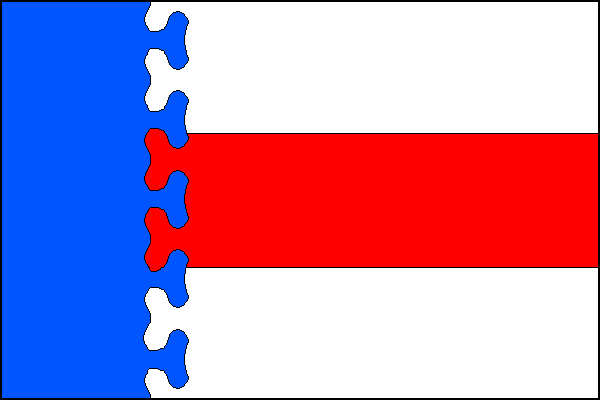
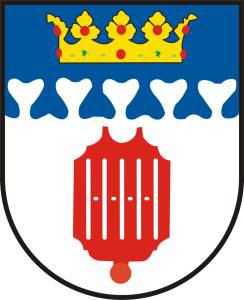
- Flag Coat of arms

- Location in the Czech Republic
- Coordinates: 50°59′26″N 14°20′8″E
- Country: Czech Republic
- Region: Ústí nad Labem
- District: Děčín
- First mentioned: 1410

Area
  - Total: 4.07 km^{2} (1.57 sq mi)
- Elevation: 322 m (1,056 ft)

Population (2026-01-01)
  - Total: 855
  - Density: 210/km^{2} (544/sq mi)
- Time zone: UTC+1 (CET)
  - Summer (DST): UTC+2 (CEST)
- Postal code: 407 80
- Website: www.vilemov.cz

Vilémov (German: Wölmsdorf) is a municipality and village in Děčín District in the Ústí nad Labem Region of the Czech Republic. It has about 900 inhabitants.

== Administrative division ==
Vilémov consists of two municipal parts (in brackets population according to the 2021 census):

- Vilémov (872)
- Dolina (12)

== Etymology ==
The initial German name of Vilémov was Wilhelmsdorf (i.e. "Wilhelm's village"). The German name Wölmsdorf was a dialectical form of Wilhelmsdorf and was used both in Czech and German from 1833 until 1946. In 1946, the municipality and the village were renamed Vilémov.

== Geography ==
Vilémov is located about 25 kilometres (16 mi) northeast of Děčín and 41 km (25 mi) northeast of Ústí nad Labem, on the border with Germany. It lies in the Lusatian Highlands. The highest point is at 475 m (1,558 ft) above sea level. The municipality is located in the Šluknov Hook area. The Sebnitz River (here called Vilémovský potok) flows through the municipality.

== History ==
The first written mention of Vilémov is from 1410. The village was founded during the colonisation by the Berka of Dubá family in the 13th century. The Berkas of Dubá owned Vilémov until 1451. In 1451, it was acquired by Duke Frederick II of Saxony. From 1566, Vilémov was part of the Lipová estate and shared its owners.

== Demographics ==
Historical population

Year	Pop.	±%
1869	876	—
1880	933	+6.5%
1890	1,121	+20.2%
1900	1,174	+4.7%
1910	1,348	+14.8%

Year	Pop.	±%
1921	1,242	−7.9%
1930	1,471	+18.4%
1950	847	−42.4%
1961	732	−13.6%
1970	790	+7.9%

Year	Pop.	±%
1980	946	+19.7%
1991	1,011	+6.9%
2001	1,028	+1.7%
2011	875	−14.9%
2021	884	+1.0%

Source: Censuses

== Transport ==
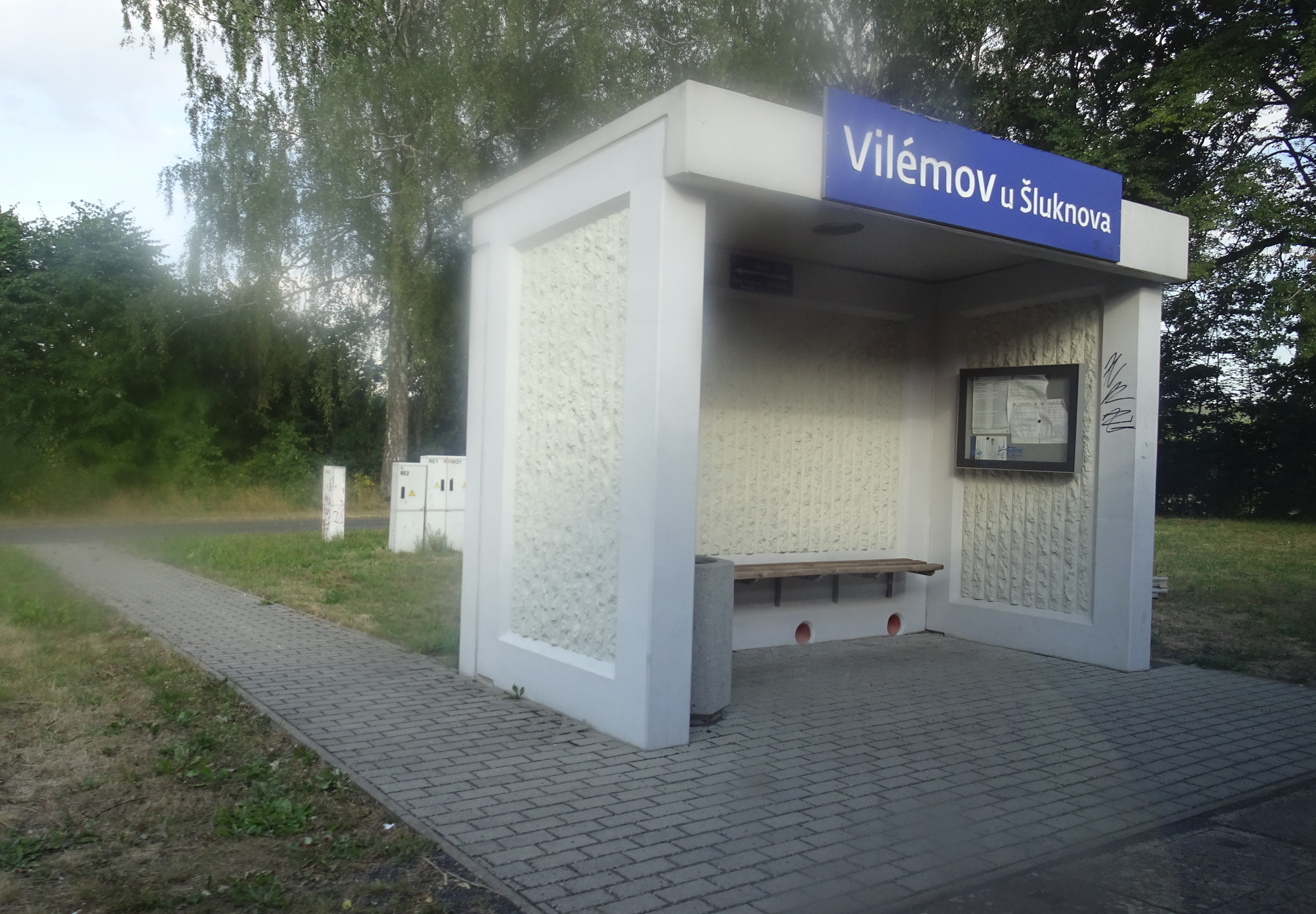
Train stop

Vilémov is located on the railway line Děčín–Rumburk via Bad Schandau and Sebnitz.

== Sport ==
Vilémov is home to a football club SK Stap Tratec Vilémov, which plays in the lower amateur tiers.

== Sights ==
The main landmark of Vilémov is the Church of the Annunciation. It was built in the Baroque style in 1728–1731. The Stations of the Cross around the church were added in 1765–1766.
