= FC Slovácká Sparta Spytihněv =

Spytihněv
- Full name: Slovácká Sparta Spytihněv z.s.
- Founded: 1927
- Manager: Onda Martin
- League: Regional Championship (Zlín) 3.A
- 2022–23: 3rd
Home colours

FC Slovácká Sparta Spytihněv is a Czech football club located in the village of Spytihněv in the Zlín Region. The club has taken part in the Czech Cup numerous times, reaching the second round in 2011–12.

The club won the regional cup for the Zlin region in 2011, beating Podkopná Lhota in the final.
