= FC Boskovice =

- Full name: FC Boskovice, z.s.
- Founded: 1926
- Chairman: Radek Stříž
- Manager: Jan Havlíček
- League: Jihomoravský krajský přebor (level 5)
- 2022–23: 3rd

FC Boskovice is a football club located in Boskovice, Czech Republic. The club has participated numerous times in the Czech Cup, reaching the third round in the 2008–09 edition.
