= Jan Šisler =

Czech footballer

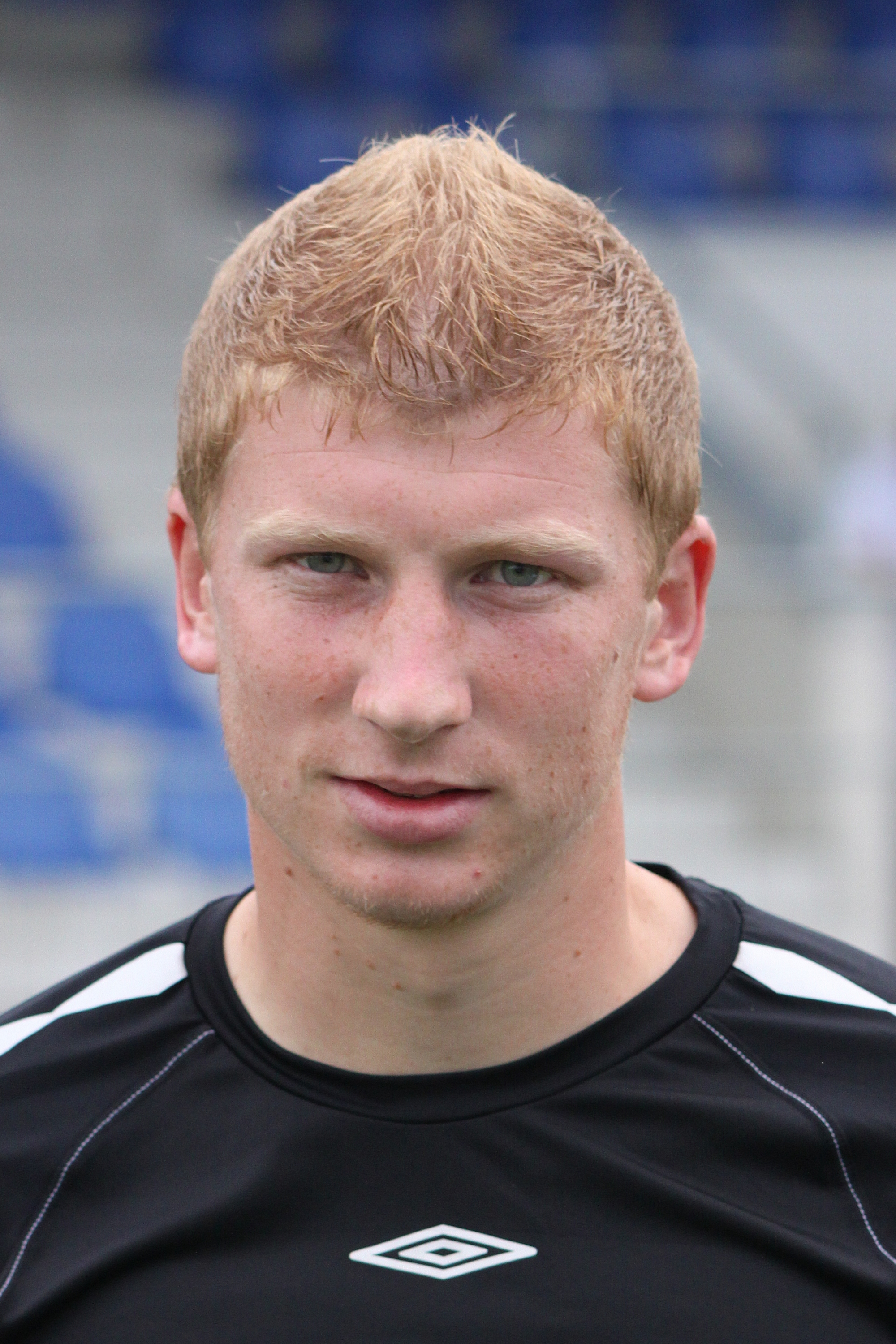

Personal information
- Date of birth: 24 April 1988 (age 38)
- Place of birth: Pavlovice, Czechoslovakia
- Height: 1.80 m (5 ft 11 in)
- Position: Midfielder

Team information
- Current team: Karvina (on loan from Mladá Boleslav)
- Number: 6

Youth career
- 1994–1996: Rapid Pavlovice
- 1996–2007: Jablonec 97

Senior career*
| Years | Team | Apps | (Gls) |
| 2007–2010 | Jablonec 97 | 1 | (0) |
| 2010–2012 | Zenit Čáslav | | |
| 2012–2014 | Hradec Králové | 49 | (8) |
| 2014– | Mladá Boleslav | 9 | (0) |
| 2014 | → Zbrojovka Brno (loan) | 12 | (1) |
| 2015– | → Karvina (loan) | | |
- * Club domestic league appearances and goals as of 1 November 2014

Jan Šisler (born 24 April 1988) is a Czech footballer who plays as a midfielder for Karvina, on loan from Mladá Boleslav. He is the brother of fellow Czech midfielder Jiri Sisler.
