= FK TJ Štěchovice =

- Full name: Fotbalový klub Tělovýchovná jednota Štěchovice
- Founded: 1926; 99 years ago
- Ground: Fotbalový stadion Štěchovice
- Capacity: 1,500
- Chairman: Zbyněk Broulík
- Manager: Vladimír Kučera
- League: Regional Championship - Prague - west
- 2021–22: 9th
- Website: https://www.fotbalstechovice.cz/
Home colours

FK TJ Štěchovice is a Czech football club located in Štěchovice. It currently plays in the Regional Championship - Prague - west, which is the fifth tier of the Czech football system.

== History ==
The club was officially founded in 1926 and it started play in lower tiers after the World War II.

The club won the regional championship in 2011, gaining promotion to the Czech Fourth Division. The team placed second in Division A, part of the Czech Fourth Division, in the 2012–13 season. From season 2012–13 to 2019-20 Štěchovice played in the Bohemian Football League. Since 2020–21 season it plays in the Regional Championship - Prague - west.

== Czech Cup ==
The club played in the 2013–14 Czech Cup, reaching the second round before losing 4–1 against FK Dukla Prague.
