= Václav Ondřejka =

Czech footballer (born 1988)

Personal information
- Date of birth: 30 April 1988 (age 38)
- Place of birth: Czechoslovakia
- Height: 1.76 m (5 ft 9 in)
- Position: Forward

Team information
- Current team: Spartak Hulín

Senior career*
| Years | Team | Apps | (Gls) |
| 2007–2014 | 1. FC Slovácko | 94 | (16) |
| 2012–2013 | → FK Mladá Boleslav (loan) | 13 | (0) |
| 2014 | MFK Karviná | 5 | (0) |
| Total | | 112 | (16) |

International career
| 2003–2004 | Czech Republic U16 | 6 | (1) |
| 2004–2005 | Czech Republic U17 | 16 | (1) |
| 2005–2006 | Czech Republic U18 | 8 | (1) |
- * Club domestic league appearances and goals

Václav Ondřejka (born 30 April 1988) is a professional Czech football player who for most of his career played for 1. FC Slovácko. He currently plays for Spartak Hulín in lower Czech tier.
