= Aleš Besta =

Czech footballer

Personal information
- Date of birth: 10 April 1983 (age 43)
- Place of birth: Ostrava, Czechoslovakia
- Height: 1.80 m (5 ft 11 in)
- Position: Striker

Youth career
- –1993: Sokol Hrabůvka
- 1993–2001: Baník Ostrava

Senior career*
Years	Team	Apps	(Gls)
2001–2005	Baník Ostrava	11	(0)
2003–2004	→ Žilina (loan)	5	(0)
2004–2005	→ Matador Púchov (loan)	31	(3)
2005–2008	Brno	84	(16)
2009–2010	Slavia Prague	8	(0)
2009–2010	→ Górnik Zabrze (loan)	13	(3)
2010	Slavia Prague B		
2012	Zlín	6	(0)
2012-2013	Karviná	21	(5)
2013	UFC Sankt Peter in der Au	0	(0)
2014	Mikulovice	10	(5)
2014-2015	SU Bischofstetten	26	(6)
2015	SK Dětmarovice		
2016	USV Kühnring	22	(18)
2017	USV Großriedenthal		

International career
1998–1999	Czech Republic U15	5	(0)
1999–2000	Czech Republic U16	8	(1)
2000–2001	Czech Republic U17	13	(0)
2001	Czech Republic U18	2	(1)
2001–2002	Czech Republic U19	10	(0)
2002–2003	Czech Republic U20	10	(5)
2004–2005	Czech Republic U21	7	(1)
- * Club domestic league appearances and goals

Aleš Besta (born 10 April 1983) is a Czech former professional footballer who played as a striker.

Besta played for Czech youth national football teams from the under-15 level and played at the 2003 FIFA World Youth Championship in the United Arab Emirates.
