= René Formánek =

Czech footballer (born 1975)

Personal information
- Date of birth: 9 January 1975 (age 51)
- Place of birth: Nový Jičín, Czechoslovakia
- Height: 1.87 m (6 ft 2 in)
- Position: Defender

Youth career
- 1983–1989: Tatra Kopřivnice
- 1989–1992: TJ Vítkovice

Senior career*
Years	Team	Apps	(Gls)
1993–1994	Tatra Kopřivnice		
1994–1995	Dukla Hranice		
1995–1998	SK Město Albrechtice		
1998–1999	Synot Staré Město		
1999–2002	FK Drnovice	40	(1)
2002–2006	Marila Příbram	119	(5)
2007–2008	Sigma Olomouc	4	(0)
2008	Fotbal Třinec (loan)	13	(1)
2008–2010	1. FC Slovácko	9	(0)
2010–2012	SFC Opava	37	(1)
- * Club domestic league appearances and goals as of 28 February 2021

René Formánek (born 9 January 1975) is a Czech former football player.

Formánek played for several Gambrinus liga clubs during his career, including 1. FC Slovácko and FK Drnovice.
