= Michal Vepřek =

Czech footballer (born 1985)

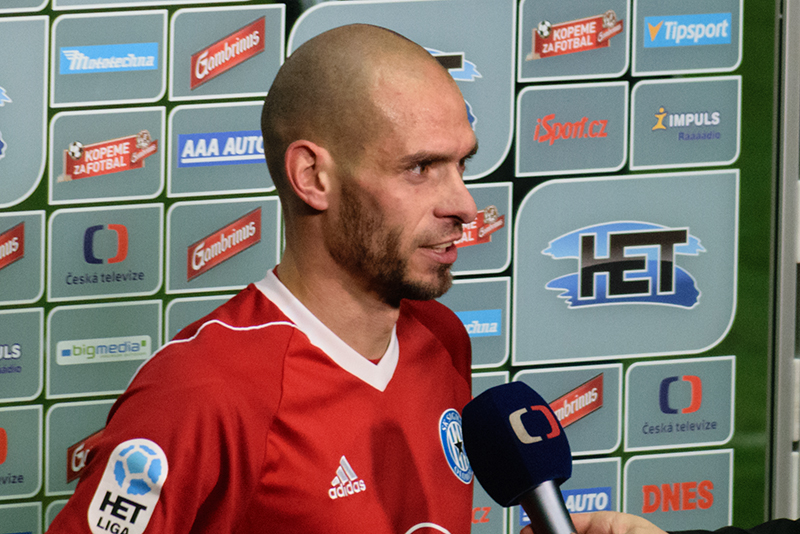

Personal information
- Date of birth: 17 June 1985 (age 41)
- Place of birth: Czechoslovakia
- Height: 1.79 m (5 ft 10 1/2 in)
- Position: Defender

Team information
- Current team: Vysocina Jihlava
- Number: 20

Youth career
- 1991–1999: TJ Šumperk
- 1999–2004: SK Sigma Olomouc

Senior career*
Years	Team	Apps	(Gls)
2004–2005	SK Lipová		
2005–	SK Sigma Olomouc	326	(7)
2007–2009	→ Vysocina Jihlava (loan)	22	(0)
2010	→ Viktoria Zizkov (loan)	13	(0)
2014–2015	→ Vysocina Jihlava (loan)	8	(0)

International career^{‡}
2002	Czech Republic U18	2	(0)
2006	Czech Republic U21	1	(0)
- * Club domestic league appearances and goals as of 2 February 2021 ‡ National team caps and goals as of 22 December 2014

Michal Vepřek (born 17 June 1985) is a Czech football player who plays for Sigma Olomouc.

At Sigma Olomouc Vepřek scored the winning goal in the final of the 2011–12 Czech Cup.

== Honours ==
SK Sigma Olomouc

- Czech Cup: 2011–12
- Czech Supercup: 2012
