= 1. FK Nová Paka =

- Full name: 1. fotbalový klub Nová Paka
- Founded: 1911
- Ground: Stadion v Jírových sadech
- League: 1.B Class, Group A – Hradec Králové Region (7th tier)
- 2022-23: 7th

1.FK Nová Paka is a Czech football club located in Nová Paka in the Hradec Králové Region. As of 2021–22, it plays in 1.B Class, Group A of the Hradec Králové Region, which is the 7th tier of the Czech football system.

The club has taken part in the Czech Cup numerous times, reaching the second round in 2011–12.
