= FC Dolní Benešov =

Dolní Benešov
- Full name: Football Club Dolní Benešov
- Founded: 1926; 99 years ago
- Ground: Stadion Dolní Benešov
- Capacity: 5,000
- Chairman: Petr Machovský
- Manager: Martin Štverka
- League: Moravskoslezský krajský přebor
- 2022–23: 12th
- Website: https://fcdb.cz/
Home colours

FC Dolní Benešov is a Czech football club located in the town of Dolní Benešov in the Moravian–Silesian Region. After winning the Czech Fourth Division in the 2017–18 season, the club played in the Moravian–Silesian Football League (3rd tier of the Czech football system).

== Historical names ==
Former club logo

- 1926 – SK Dolní Benešov (Sportovní klub Dolní Benešov)
- 1933 – SK JHB Dolní Benešov (Sportovní klub Josef Holuscha Benešov Dolní Benešov)
- 1945 – SK Dolní Benešov (Sportovní klub Dolní Benešov)
- 1949 – ZSJ MSA Dolní Benešov (Závodní sokolská jednota Moravsko-Slezská armaturka Dolní Benešov) – merger of SK Dolní Benešov with ZSK MSA Dolní Benešov (founded 1947)
- 1953 – DSO Spartak Dolní Benešov (Dobrovolná sportovní organisace Spartak Dolní Benešov)
- 1957 – TJ Spartak Dolní Benešov (Tělovýchovná jednota Spartak Dolní Benešov)
- 1974 – TJ MSA Dolní Benešov (Tělovýchovná jednota Moravsko-Slezská armaturka Dolní Benešov)
- 1979 – TJ Sigma Dolní Benešov (Tělovýchovná jednota Sigma Dolní Benešov)
- 1992 – FC MSA Dolní Benešov (Football Club Moravsko-Slezská armaturka Dolní Benešov)
- 2014 – FC Dolní Benešov (Football Club Dolní Benešov)

== Czech Cup ==
The club reached the second round of the 2011–12 Czech Cup before losing to divisional rivals, FK Mikulovice, by a 4–0 scoreline. The club reached the same stage in the cup in 2004–05 and 2005–06.
