= Martin Jindráček =

Czech footballer

Personal information
- Date of birth: 29 November 1989 (age 36)
- Place of birth: Roudnice nad Labem, Czechoslovakia
- Height: 1.85 m (6 ft 1 in)
- Position: Midfielder

Team information
- Current team: Příbram
- Number: 19

Senior career*
Years	Team	Apps	(Gls)
2008–2016	Teplice	70	(6)
2009–2011	→ Ústí nad Labem (loan)	58	(7)
2015	→ Slavoj Vyšehrad (loan)	14	(0)
2016	→ Baník Most (loan)		
2016–2018	Ústí nad Labem	54	(13)
2018	→ Teplice (loan)	10	(0)
2019	Teplice	18	(0)
2020–	Příbram	7	(0)

International career
2006–2007	Czech Republic U18	12	(4)
- * Club domestic league appearances and goals as of 19:52, 20 July 2020 (UTC)

Martin Jindráček (born 29 November 1989) is a Czech football player who currently plays for 1. FK Příbram.
