= FC Slovan Rosice =

- Full name: Football Club Slovan Rosice
- Founded: 1909; 116 years ago
- Ground: Stadion FC Slovan Rosice
- Capacity: 1,500
- Chairman: Petr Soustružník
- Manager: Zdeněk Matoušek
- League: Moravian–Silesian Football League
- 2024–25: 15th
- Website: http://www.fc-rosice.cz/
Home colours

FC Slovan Rosice is a Czech football club located in Rosice in the South Moravian Region. After promotion from the Czech Fourth Division in 2019, the club played in the Moravian–Silesian Football League. After 2024–25 season, director and main sponsor Zdeňek Fukan left and since then the club only play in the 5 tier Czech regional championships.

== Historical names ==
- 1909 – SK Slovan Rosice (Sportovní klub Slovan Rosice)
- 1954 – TJ Slovan Rosice (Tělovýchovná jednota Slovan Rosice)
- 1999 – FC Slovan Rosice (Football Club Slovan Rosice)

== Czech Cup ==
In the 2012–13 Czech Cup, Rosice knocked out Czech First League side FC Zbrojovka Brno at the second round stage, eventually progressing to the fourth round.
