= FK Jaroměř =

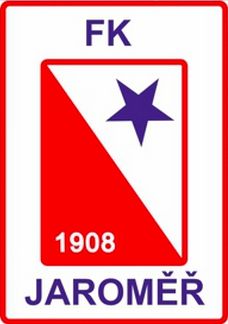
- Full name: FK Jaroměř
- Founded: 1908
- Ground: V Růžovce
- Capacity: 200
- League: Krajský přebor (5th tier)
- 2022–23: 6th
- Website: https://www.fotbaljaromer.cz

FK Jaroměř is a Czech football club located in Jaroměř.

== Stadium ==
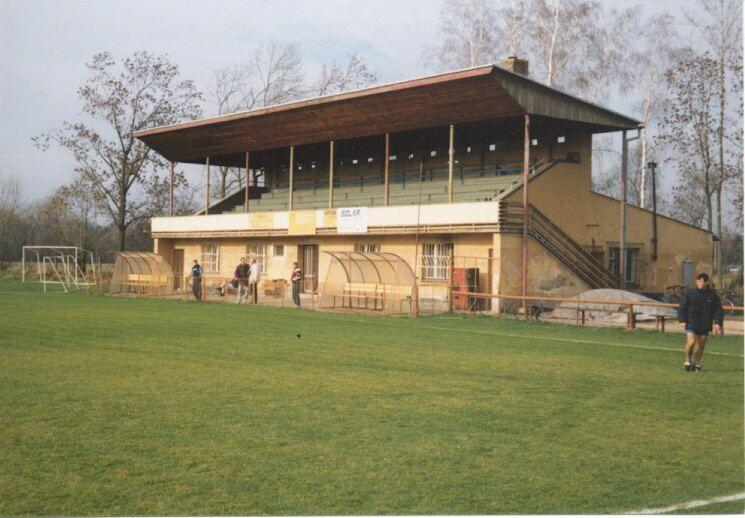
Tribune before reconstruction

FK Jaroměř plays at V Růžovce stadium with a seating capacity of 200.
