= TJ Dvůr Králové =

- Full name: TJ Dvůr Králové nad Labem
- Founded: 1906
- Manager: František Šturma
- League: Czech Fourth Division – Divize C
- 2022–23: 15th (relegated)

TJ Dvůr Králové is a Czech football club located in the town of Dvůr Králové nad Labem in the Hradec Králové Region. It currently plays in Divize C, which is in the Czech Fourth Division. The club has taken part in the Czech Cup numerous times, reaching the second round in 2004–05, 2005–06, 2006–07, 2007–08, 2008–09, 2009–10, 2010–11, 2012–13 and 2013–14.
