= FC Dragoun Břevnov =

Dragoun Břevnov
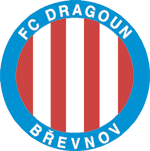
- Full name: FC Dragoun Břevnov
- Founded: 1906
- Dissolved: 2006
- Final season 2005–06: 15th in Bohemian Football League
Home colours

FC Dragoun Břevnov was a Czech football club located in the district of Břevnov in Prague and sponsored by the company Dragoun. The club was founded in 1906. The club won Divize A in the Czech Fourth Division in the 2002–03 season. It went on to play in the Bohemian Football League, finishing in third place in the 2003–04 season. This was despite being bottom of the league after having played 20 of its 34 games that season. Between the 2001–02 and 2005–06 seasons, the club took part in the Czech Cup. After losing the support of the main sponsor, Dragoun, the club went defunct, with the reserve team of FK Mladá Boleslav taking over Břevnov's place in the Bohemian Football League in 2006.
