= FK Litoměřicko =

Czech football club

- Full name: Fotbalový klub Litoměřicko
- Founded: 1919; 107 years ago
- Ground: Fotbalový stadion Města Litoměřice
- Capacity: 2,300 (1,000 seated)
- Chairman: Robert Mühlfait
- Manager: Štefan Knapík
- League: A1A - Krajský přebor, Ústecký kraj
- 2022–23: 5th
- Website: https://www.fklitomericko.cz/

Former club logo

FK Litoměřicko is a Czech football club located in Litoměřice, in the Ústí nad Labem Region. It plays in the Krajský přebor (the fifth tier of football in the country).

For the first time in club history, they got promoted into the third tier of Czech football in 2016, upon having bought the licence from nearby Lovosice, having spent the previous 97 years of their existence in the fourth tier or below. In 2019 the club announced financial problems and voluntarily moved from 3rd to 5th league.
