= SK Klatovy 1898 =

Football club in the Czech Republic

- Full name: SK Klatovy 1898
- Founded: 1898
- Ground: Na Rozvoji, Klatovy
- Capacity: 500
- Coordinates: 49°24′01″N 13°18′10″E
- Chairman: Jindřich Sojka
- Manager: Milan Dejmek
- League: Czech Fourth Division – Divize A
- 2016–17: 6th

SK Klatovy 1898 is a Czech football club located in Klatovy in the Plzeň Region. It currently plays in the Czech Fourth Division. The club has taken part in the Czech Cup numerous times, reaching the third round of the tournament in 2006–07 and 2015–16.
