= FK Mikulovice =

- Full name: Fotbalový Klub Mikulovice z.s.
- Nickname: Mikulky
- Ground: Stadion Ivana Dosta
- Chairman: Jiří Zlatník
- Manager: Jaroslav Maňur
- League: I.B třída OK, skup.C
- 2023/24: I.B třída OK, skup.C, 1st
Home colours	Away colours

FK Mikulovice is a Czech football club located in the village of Mikulovice in the Olomouc Region. Mikulovice played in the Moravian–Silesian Football League, which is the third highest league in the Czech republic.

In 2011 FK Mikulovice played against team from Synot Liga – FK Teplice in Czech Cup, but they lost 0–4.

Two years later they had their second chance. They played against SK Sigma Olomouc, but they lost again 1–2. Kamil Šebesta scored Mikulovice's only goal.

At the season 2013/2014 Mikulovice were in Moravian–Silesian Football League. Mikulovice ended the season on the 13th place, but they voluntarily relegated to Okresní Přebor because MSFL was very financially demanding for such a small club as FK Mikulovice was.

Season 2014/15 was the beginning of the new age of this football club. They were in Okresní Přebor and they ended the season on the 10th position. Next season 2015/16 it wasn't better, because of the 11th position. But the 2016/17 season was breakthrough. At the half of the season, the team was on the 6th place with just 4 points loss for the league leader. And at the end of the season they were on the 4th position. First three teams didn't want to promote to higher league, so Mikulovice play I.B třída since the 2017/18 season.

== Players ==
=== Former famous players ===
Note: Flags indicate national team as defined under FIFA eligibility rules; some limited exceptions apply. Players may hold more than one non-FIFA nationality.

No.	Pos.	Nation	Player
—	GK	CZE	Filip Mucha
—	MF	CZE	Tomáš Kazár
—	FW	CZE	Aleš Besta
—	FW	SVK	Martin Prohászka
