= SK Stap Tratec Vilémov =

SK Vilémov
- Full name: SK Stap Tratec Vilémov
- Founded: 1956 (as Jiskra Stap Vilémov)
- League: Czech Fourth Division B
- 2022–23: 16th
- Website: http://www.skvilemov.cz/

SK Stap Tratec Vilémov is a Czech football club located in Vilémov (Děčín District) in the Ústí nad Labem Region. It currently plays on the 4th tier of the Czech football system.
