= SK Převýšov =

Czech football club

- Full name: Sportovní klub Převýšov
- League: A2B - CK VOTROK 3. třída západ
- 2022–23: 5th

SK Převýšov is a Czech football club located in the village of Převýšov in the Hradec Králové Region. It currently (2024–25) plays in the III. třída of the Hradec Králové District, which is the lowest tier of Czech football. SK Převýšov played in the Bohemian Football League in 2012–2019, but in 2019 the club decided to sell its licence to FK Chlumec nad Cidlinou.

In August 2011, the club rose to national attention after defeating one of the biggest clubs in the country, SK Slavia Prague, 3–0 in the third round of the 2011–12 Czech Cup as a club from the Czech Fourth Division.
