= FK Tachov =

Tachov
- Full name: FK Tachov
- Founded: 1950
- Manager: Pavel Vaigl
- League: Krajský přebor, Plzeňský kraj
- 2022–23: 1st (promoted)
Home colours

Former club logo

FK Tachov is a Czech football club located in the town of Tachov in the Plzeň Region. It currently (2026-27) plays in the Plzeň regional champiomship, which is at the fifth level of domestic football competition.

In 2009, Tachov reached the second round of the 2009–10 Czech Cup, where they lost to 1. FC Karlovy Vary, 16–15 on penalties. The club set an attendance record in September 2015, as 2,850 spectators watched the Czech Cup third round match against Viktoria Plzeň, a game which finished 2–0 to the visitors.

Between 2015 and 2017, the club played at the third level of Czech league system.
