= SK Spartak Hulín =

Spartak Hulín
- Full name: SK Spartak Hulín - kopaná, z.s.
- Founded: 1932
- Ground: Sportovní areál města Hulín; Hulín, Czech Republic
- Capacity: 2,500
- Manager: Jindřich Lehkoživ
- League: Kroměříž, Okresní přebor
- 2022–23: 10th
- Website: http://www.spartakhulin.com/
Home colours

SK Spartak Hulín is a Czech football club located in Hulín. After relegation from the Moravian–Silesian Football League in 2019, the club stopped its activities and since 2020–21 season it plays in the lower amateur tiers.

== Historical names ==
- 1932 – SK Sparta Hulín (Sportovní klub Sparta Hulín)
- 1939 – DSK Hulín (Dělnický sportovní klub Hulín)
- 1941 – SK Hulín (Sportovní klub Hulín)
- 1947 – SK Pilana Hulín (Sportovní klub Pilana Hulín)
- 1948 – JTO Sokol Hulín (Sokol Hulín)
- 1951 – ZSJ ZPS Hulín (Závodní sokolská jednota Závody přesného strojírenství Hulín)
- 1953 – DSO Spartak Hulín (Dobrovolná sportovní organisace Spartak Hulín)
- 1956 – TJ Spartak Hulín (Tělovýchovná jednota Spartak Hulín)
- 1994 – fusion with VTJ Kroměříž => SK VTJ Spartak Hulín (Sportovní klub Vojenská tělovýchovná jednota Spartak Hulín)
- 2003 – SK Spartak Hulín (Sportovní klub Spartak Hulín)

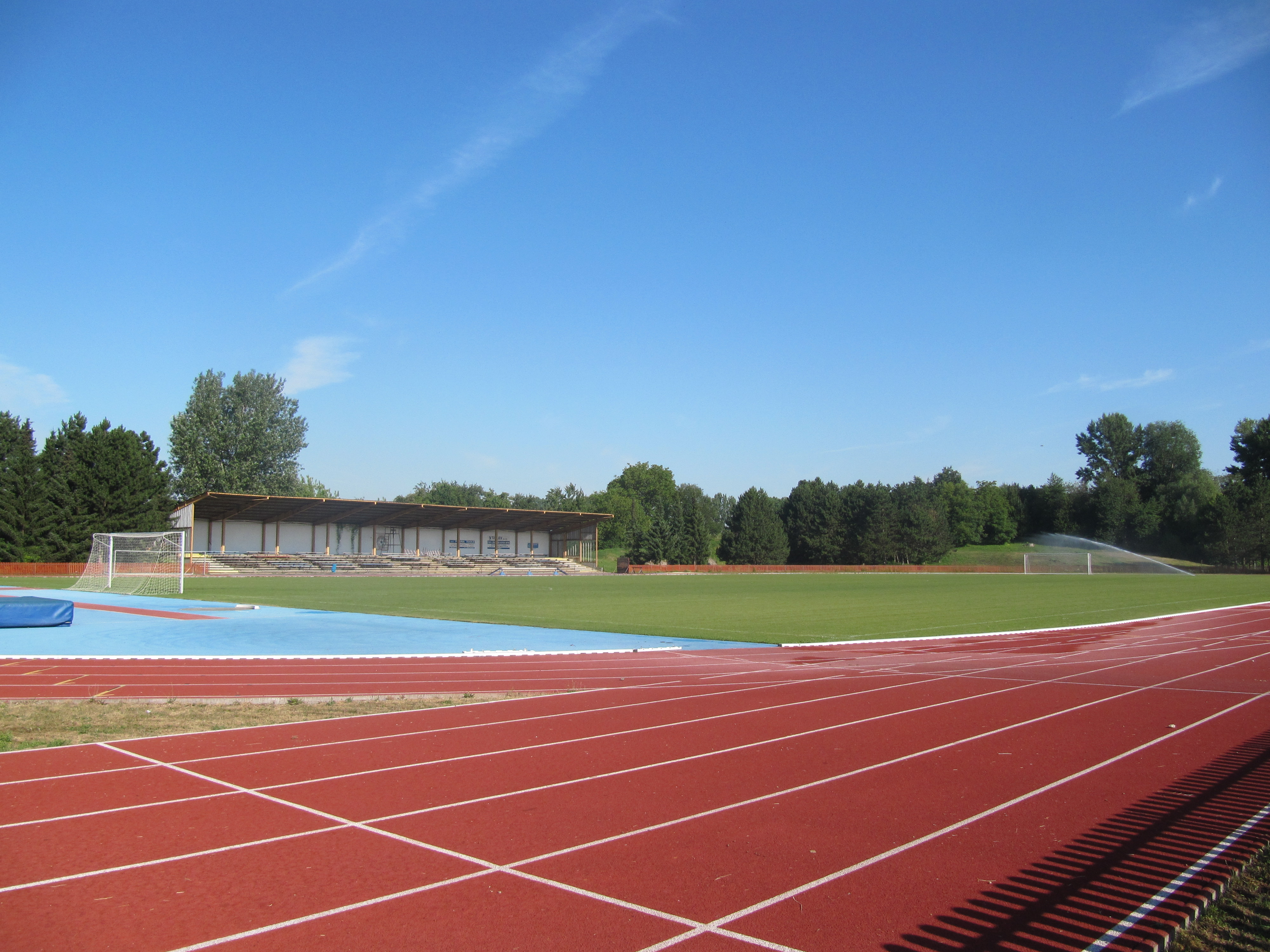
Stadium of SK Spartak Hulín
