= FK Mohelnice =

Mohelnice
- Full name: FK Mohelnice
- Founded: 1946
- Ground: Městský stadion Mohelnice
- Capacity: 650 (500 seated)
- Manager: Roman Sedláček
- League: Krajský přebor (5th tier)
- 2021–22: 3rd

FK Mohelnice is a Czech football club located in Mohelnice in the Olomouc Region. Since the 2018–19 season, it plays in the fifth tier of Czech football. The clubs FK Mohelnice and Tatran Moravičany merged in 1995 to become FK Mohelnice–Moravičany. The club has taken part in the Czech Cup on a number of occasions.

== Controversy ==
In 2017, the club was purchased by a Chinese investor. This led to a flurry of seemingly irrational transfer activity and suspicions of match fixing. In early 2018, the Czech Football Association reported their findings about the situation to the police and the organized crime department launched an investigation of the club and its owners. On 5 February, an unnamed Mohelnice player came forward as a witness, admitting to having been complicit in fixing a Third Division match, being both blackmailed and offered bribes by a teammate to deliberately make defensive errors during the match.
