= FK Hořovicko =

- Full name: FK Hořovicko
- Founded: 2008
- Ground: Městský stadion Hořovice
- Manager: Pavel Trávník
- League: Czech Fourth Division – Divize A
- 2021–22: 13th

FK Hořovicko is a Czech football club located in Hořovice. It currently plays in Divize A, which is in the Czech Fourth Division. Pavel Trávník was announced as their new coach on 11 July 2011, replacing Jan Berger.
