= 1. HFK Olomouc =

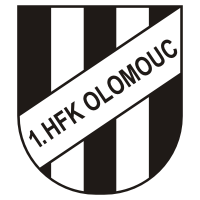
- Full name: 1. Holický Fotbalový Klub Olomouc
- Founded: 1932
- Ground: Stadion FK Holice; Olomouc
- Capacity: 2,900
- Chairman: Vladimír Dostál
- Manager: Vojtěch Pospíšil
- League: Divize E
- 2024–25: 15th (relegated)
- Website: https://www.1hfkolomouc.cz/
Home colours	Away colours

1. HFK Olomouc is a football club in the Czech Republic, based in Olomouc. The club is currently playing in the Czech regional championships. The club previously played in the Czech 2. Liga from 2005–06 until relegation in the 2008–09 season. In 2012–13, HFK Olomouc finished third in the Second Division but were relegated due to financial difficulties.

Following a promotion to the 2. Liga for the 2000–01 season, the club changed its name from FK Holice 1932 to 1. HFK Olomouc.

1. HFK Olomouc advanced to the last 16 stage of the Czech Cup during the 2002–03, 2004–05, 2005–06 and 2010–11 seasons, but never made it into the quarter finals, losing on each occasion.

== Historical names ==
- 1932 – FK Holice 1932
- 1948 – Sokol Holice
- 1950 – Závodní sokolská jednota Holice
- 1953 – TJ Spartak Holice
- 1968 – Sokol Holice
- 1972 – TJ Olomouc-Holice
- 1994 – FK Holice 1932 (merged with FC Lokomotiva Olomouc)
- 2000 – 1. HFK Olomouc 1. HFK OLOMOUC, a. s. (První Holický Fotbalový Klub)

== Players ==
=== Current squad ===
As of 27 February 2016.

Note: Flags indicate national team as defined under FIFA eligibility rules; some limited exceptions apply. Players may hold more than one non-FIFA nationality.

No.	Pos.	Nation	Player
1	GK	(Czech Republic) CZE	Filip Mucha
2	DF	(Czech Republic) CZE	Jiří Bernard
4	MF	(Czech Republic) CZE	Ondřej Buček
5	MF	(Czech Republic) CZE	Jan Tögel
6	DF	(Czech Republic) CZE	Jan Kotouč
8	DF	(Czech Republic) CZE	Jaroslav Grézl
9	FW	(Czech Republic) CZE	Marek Heinz
—	MF	(Czech Republic) CZE	Jan Šteigl

No.	Pos.	Nation	Player
16	MF	(Czech Republic) CZE	Petr Štěpánek
17	MF	(Czech Republic) CZE	Ondřej Buček
20	MF	(Czech Republic) CZE	Gianpaolo Pezzotti
30	GK	(Czech Republic) CZE	Patrik Neuer
—	FW	(Czech Republic) CZE	Ondřej Pyclík
—	DF	(Czech Republic) CZE	Filip Přikryl
—	DF	(Slovenia) SVN	Jure Srnec

== Managers ==
- Karel Trnečka (1999–2000)
- Milan Gajdůšek (2000)
- Petr Mrázek (2000)
- Josef Pučálka (2000)
- Alexander Bokij (2001)
- Roman Pivarník (2001)
- Karel Trnečka (2001)
- Roman Pivarník (2001–2002)
- Bohuš Keller (2002)
- Miloslav Machálek (2002–2003)
- Luděk Kokoška (2003–2004)
- Vítězslav Kolda (2004)
- Leoš Kalvoda (2004–2007)
- Tomáš Uličný (2008)
- Josef Mucha (2008–2009)
- Miroslav Kouřil (2009)
- Petr Uličný (2009–2011)
- Oldřich Machala (2011–2013)
- Jiří Derco (2013–)

== History in domestic competitions ==
- 1996–1999 Czech Fourth Division
- 1999–2000 MSFL
- 2000–2004 Czech 2. Liga
- 2004–2005 MSFL
- 2005–2009 Czech 2. Liga
- 2009–2012 MSFL
- 2012–2013 Czech 2. Liga
- 2013–2018 MSFL
- 2018–2025 Czech Fourth Division
- 2025– Czech regional championships

- Seasons spent at Level 1 of the football league system: 0
- Seasons spent at Level 2 of the football league system: 9
- Seasons spent at Level 3 of the football league system: 10
- Seasons spent at Level 4 of the football league system: 10
- Seasons spent at Level 5 of the football league system: 1

=== Czech Republic ===
Season	League	Placed	Pld	W	D	L	GF	GA	GD	Pts	Cup
1996–1997	4. liga	2nd	30	17	5	8	56	32	+24	56	First Round
1997–1998	4. liga	2nd	30	20	4	6	83	39	+44	64	First Round
1998–1999	4. liga	1st	30	26	3	1	78	15	+63	81	
1999–2000	3. liga	1st	28	16	7	5	52	37	+15	55	
2000–2001	2. liga	13th	30	10	5	15	38	45	-7	35	
2001–2002	2. liga	11th	30	9	8	13	34	41	-7	35	Round of 32
2002–2003	2. liga	9th	30	10	11	9	42	43	-1	41	Round of 16
2003–2004	2. liga	15th	30	7	11	12	21	35	-14	32	Round of 32
2004–2005	3. liga	1st									Round of 16
2005–2006	2. liga	6th	30	9	14	7	27	31	-4	41	Round of 16
2006–2007	2. liga	3rd	30	16	5	9	40	28	+12	53	Round of 32
2007–2008	2. liga	8th	30	11	8	11	33	38	-5	41	Quarterfinals
2008–2009	2. liga	15th	30	5	12	13	32	42	-10	27	Second Round
2009–2010	3. liga	2nd	28	14	6	8	53	33	+20	48	Second Round
2010–2011	3. liga	2nd									Round of 16
2011–2012	3. liga	1st									Second Round
2012–2013	2. liga	3rd	30	15	5	10	41	44	-3	50	Round of 32
2013–2014	3. liga	10th									Round of 32
2014–2015	3. liga	14th									First Round
2015–2016	3. liga	14th	30	6	8	16	27	54	–27	26	First Round
2016–2017	3. liga	13th	30	9	8	13	31	52	–21	35	Preliminary Round
2017–2018	3. liga	15th	30	6	4	20	39	74	–35	22	Round of 32
2018–2019	4. liga (E)	13th									Did not participate
2019–2020	4. liga (E)	3rd									First Round
2020–2021	4. liga (E)	12th									First Round
2021–2022	4. liga (E)	12th									Preliminary Round
2022–2023	4. liga (E)	14th									Preliminary Round
2023–2024	4. liga (E)	11th									First Round
2024–2025	4. liga (E)	16th	28	7	3	18	35	66	-31	24	
2025–2026	5. liga										

== Honours ==
- Moravian–Silesian Football League (third tier)
  - Champions (3): 1999–2000, 2004–05, 2011–12
