= TJ Sokol Ovčáry =

Czech football club

Sokol Ovčáry
- Full name: TJ Sokol Ovčáry
- League: 3. třída Mělník
- 2022–23: 5th

TJ Sokol Ovčáry is a football club located in the village of Ovčáry (Mělník District), Czech Republic. The club played in the Bohemian Football League in the 2011–2012 season.

Despite finishing 10th of 18 teams in the 2011–12 Bohemian Football League, due to financial reasons Ovčáry left the league at the end of the season and took their place two divisions lower, in the Středočeský krajský přebor, the following season.
