= Jiří Jech =

Czech football referee

- Born: 22 December 1975 (age 50); Czechoslovakia

Domestic
Years	League	Role

International
Years	League	Role
2007–2010	FIFA listed	Referee

Jiří Jech (born 22 December 1975) is a Czech football referee. He was a full international for FIFA from 2007 to 2010, and served as a referee in 2010 World Cup qualifiers.

== Career statistics ==
Statistics for Gambrinus liga matches only.

Season	Games	Total (yellow card)	(yellow card) per game	Total (red card)	(red card) per game	Reference
2006/07	24	88	3.67	2	0.09	
2007/08	21	70	3.33	0	0	
2008/09	19	64	3.37	0	0	
2009/10	10	30	3	1	0.1	
2010/11	10	38	3.8	2	0.2	
Overall	84	290	3.45	5	0.06	
Please Note: There are no available records prior to 2006/2007
