= FC Hlučín =

- Full name: Football Club Hlučín
- Founded: 1923; 103 years ago
- Ground: Městský fotbalový stadion Hlučín
- Capacity: 2,380
- Chairman: Josef Trejtnar
- Manager: Radomír Korytář
- League: Moravian-Silesian Football League
- 2025–26: 17th (relegated)
- Website: https://www.fchlucin.cz/
Home colours	Away colours

FC Hlučín is a Czech football club based in Hlučín. It currently plays in the Divize F, which is the fourth tier of Czech football. The club played in the Czech 2. Liga for three seasons between 2005 and 2008, and returned for two more seasons in 2009–2010 and 2010–2011.

== Historical names ==
Club logo until 2021

- 1923 – SK Hlučín (Sportovní klub Hlučín)
- 1948 – Sokol Hlučín
- 1953 – DSO Slavoj Hlučín
- 1959 – TJ Hlučín
- 1991 – FC Hlučín

== Honours ==
- Moravian–Silesian Football League (third tier)
  - Champions 2008–09
