= FK Frýdek-Místek =

- Full name: Fotbalový klub Frýdek-Místek
- Founded: 1921; 105 years ago
- Ground: Stovky
- Capacity: 12,400
- Chairman: Radek Šmíd
- Manager: Lukáš Papřok
- League: Moravian-Silesian Football League
- 2025–26: 6th
- Website: https://fotbal-fm.cz/
Home colours	Away colours

FK Frýdek-Místek is a football club based in Frýdek-Místek, Czech Republic. It currently plays in the Moravian-Silesian Football League, which is the third tier of Czech football.

== History ==
Club crest until 2025

Club crest until 2021

The club was founded in 1921 as Karlovohutní fotbalový klub. It took part in the 1976–77 Czechoslovak First League. On 1 July 2011, the club became officially known as Městský fotbalový klub Frýdek-Místek, marking a new period in the club's history, having the town of Frýdek-Místek as its main sponsor.

== Historical names ==
- 1921 — Karlovohutní fotbalový klub
- 1950 — ZJS Železárny Stalingrad
- 1954 — Baník Místek
- 1958 — TJ Železárny Stalingrad
- 1960 — TJ Válcovny plechu Frýdek-Místek
- 1991 — FK Válcovny plechu Frýdek-Místek
- 2003 — FK Frýdek-Místek
- 2004 — Fotbal Frýdek-Místek
- 2011 — MFK Frýdek-Místek
- 2021 — FK Frýdek-Místek

== Past results ==
=== 1971–1993 ===
	71/72	72/73	73/74	74/75	75/76	76/77	77/78	78/79	79/80	80/81	81/82	82/83	83/84	84/85	85/86	86/87	87/88	88/89	89/90	90/91	91/92	92/93
1. Liga						15.
2. Liga					1.		1.	1.	7.	6.	9.	10.	6.	13.	13.	4.	3.	9.	16.
3. Liga			5.	1.																14.	2.	1.
4. Liga		1.
5. Liga	1.

=== 1993–present ===
	93/94	94/95	95/96	96/97	97/98	98/99	99/00	00/01	01/02	02/03	03/04	04/05	05/06	06/07	07/08	08/09	09/10	10/11	11/12	12/13	13/14
1. Liga
2. Liga	6.	7.	10.	11.	9.	10.	16.														14.
3. Liga								12.	14.	4.	15.			4.	5.	6.	4.	3.	2.	2.
4. Liga												9.	2.
