= FK Letohrad =

Letohrad
- Full name: FK Letohrad
- Founded: 1919
- Ground: Stadion Letohrad
- Capacity: 2,750 (1,050 seated)
- Chairman: Stanislav Beneš
- Manager: Aleš Majvald
- League: Pardubice regional championship (level 5)
- 2025–26: 11th

FK Letohrad is a football club located in Letohrad, Czech Republic. Since the 2024/2025 season, it plays in Pardubice regional Championship, one of the Czech regional championships.

The club was promoted from the Czech Fourth Division in 2011.
