= Moravian-Silesian Football League =

Moravskoslezská fotbalová liga
- Founded: 1991
- Country: Czech Republic
- Confederation: UEFA
- Number of clubs: 18
- Level on pyramid: 3
- Promotion to: Czech National Football League
- Relegation to: Fourth Division (Divize D, E or F)
- Domestic cup: Czech Cup
- Current champions: Třinec
- Website: www.msfl.cz
- Current: 2026–27

The Moravian-Silesian Football League (MSFL; Czech: Moravskoslezská fotbalová liga) is one of the third level football leagues in the Czech Republic (the other is the Bohemian Football League) headquartered in Olomouc. The league comprises teams from the historic regions of Moravia and Silesia and partially also Bohemia.

The league was formed in 1991 during the Czechoslovakia era, replacing the former II.ČNL (II. Česká národni liga; Second Czech National League) at the third tier of Czechoslovak football alongside sister league ČFL.

The winner of MSFL is promoted to the Czech National Football League. Three clubs are promoted to the MSFL – the winners of Divize D, E and F of the Czech Fourth Division.

== Moravian-Silesian Football League clubs in 2026–27 ==
Club	Previous season
FK Hodonín	2nd
SK Uničov	3rd
Zbrojovka Brno B	4th
SK Sigma Olomouc B	5th
FK Frýdek-Místek	6th
SFK Vrchovina	7th
TJ Unie Hlubina	8th
FC Vsetín	9th
MFK Vítkovice	10th
FC Zlín B	11th
1. FC Slovácko B	12th
FK SK Polanka nad Odrou	13th
FK Blansko	14th
MFK Karviná B	15th
SK Hranice	16th
SK Artis Brno B	Promoted from Divize D
Uherský Brod	Promoted from Divize E
Havířov	Promoted from Divize F

== Moravian-Silesian Football League champions ==
Season	Winners	Runners-up
1991–92	SKP Znojmo-Práče	VP Frýdek-Místek
1992–93	VP Frýdek-Místek	ZD Bohumín
1993–94	FC Slovácká Slavia Uherské Hradiště	ČSK Uherský Brod
1994–95	FC Alfa Slušovice	FC Tatran Poštorná
1995–96	FC Vítkovice	ČSK Uherský Brod
1996–97	FC Synot Staré Město	SK Baník Ratíškovice
1997–98	FC NH Ostrava	SK Baník Ratíškovice
1998–99	SK Baník Ratíškovice	FC MSA Dolní Benešov
1999–00	FK Holice 1932	FC PSJ Jihlava
2000–01	SK Sigma Olomouc B	Fotbal Kunovice
2001–02	Fotbal Kunovice	FC Group Dolní Kounice
2002–03	FK Drnovice	FC Baník Ostrava B
2003–04	SK Hanácká Slavia Kroměříž	FC Dosta Bystrc-Kníničky
2004–05	1. HFK Olomouc	FC Hlučín
2005–06	Jakubčovice Fotbal	FC Dosta Bystrc-Kníničky
2006–07	Fotbal Fulnek	FK Mutěnice
2007–08	SK Sigma Olomouc B	1. SC Znojmo
2008–09	FC Hlučín	1. SC Znojmo
2009–10	1. SC Znojmo	1. HFK Olomouc
2010–11	SFC Opava	1. HFK Olomouc
2011–12	1. HFK Olomouc	MFK Frýdek-Místek
2012–13	FK Fotbal Třinec	MFK Frýdek-Místek
2013–14	SFC Opava	SK Sigma Olomouc B
2014–15	SK Sigma Olomouc B	SK Hanácká Slavia Kroměříž
2015–16	1. SK Prostějov	MFK Vítkovice
2016–17	SK Uničov	SK Sigma Olomouc B
2017–18	1. SK Prostějov	FC Velké Meziříčí
2018–19	SK Líšeň	FC Odra Petřkovice
2019–20	FK Blansko	FC Odra Petřkovice
2020–21	1. FC Slovácko B	FC Odra Petřkovice
2021–22	SK Sigma Olomouc B	SK Hanácká Slavia Kroměříž
2022–23	SK Hanácká Slavia Kroměříž	FC Hlučín
2023–24	FC Baník Ostrava B	FC Zlínsko
2024–25	SK Hanácká Slavia Kroměříž	FK Třinec
2025–26	FK Třinec	FK Hodonín
