= 2024–25 Czech Cup =

MOL Cup

Tournament details
- Country: Czech Republic

Final positions
- Champions: Sigma Olomouc (2nd title)
- Runners-up: Sparta Prague

The 2024–25 Czech Cup, known as the MOL Cup for sponsorship reasons, was the 32nd season of the annual knockout football tournament of the Czech Republic. The winners qualified for the 2025–26 UEFA Europa League.

== Extra preliminary round ==
Twelve teams from the eastern part of the country took part in the extra preliminary round. The draw was made on 2 July.

Team 1	Score	Team 2
20 July 2024
TJ Tatran Rousínov	0–3	FC Kuřim
SK Tichá	2–2 (8–9 p)	FK Nový Jičín
21 July 2024
TJ Sokol Čechovice	5–2	FC Kostelec na Hané
SK Fotbalová škola Třebíč	2–2 (3–4 p)	FC Velké Meziříčí
FK Petřvald na Moravě	3–2	TJ Řepiště
24 July 2024
SC Pustá Polom	1–5	FC Bílovec

== Preliminary round ==
The draw was made on 2 July. 1. SC Znojmo FK withdrew from their match against TJ Sokol Tasovice after Znojmo's owner stopped funding the club. TJ Sokol Tasovice were awarded a walkover and advanced directly to the first round.

Team 1	Score	Team 2
26 July 2024
FC Velké Meziříčí	0–2	TJ Tatran Bohunice
FK Krnov	0–7	FC Hlučín
MSK Břeclav	0–3	FK Hodonín
FC TVD Slavičín	1–3	FC Strání
SK Hranice	2–1	Tatran Všechovice
FK Petřvald na Moravě	0–1	MFK Vítkovice
FC Fastav Vsetín	1–3	FC Zlínsko
27 July 2024
FC Kuřim	4–1	SFK Vrchovina
TJ Skaštice	0–4	ČSK Uherský Brod
TJ Břidličná	1–2	SK Jiskra Rýmařov
FK Nový Jičín	0–1	FC Vratimov
TJ Slovan Bzenec	1–1 (4–1 p)	TJ Sokol Lanžhot
TJ Sokol Čechovice	0–6	1. HFK Olomouc
FC Slovan Havlíčkův Brod	3–3 (2–4 p)	FC Slovan Rosice
FC ŽĎAS Žďár nad Sázavou	5–1	FK Blansko
28 July 2024
TJ Sokol Tasovice	3–0 w/o	1. SC Znojmo FK
MFK Havířov	1–1 (4–3 p)	FK Třinec
FK Bospor Bohumín	0–0 (6–5 p)	TJ Unie Hlubina
FC Kvasice	2–1	SK Baťov 1930
FK Kozlovice	1–0	SFK ELKO Holešov
TJ Valašské Meziříčí	1–4	FK Frýdek-Místek
FC Bílovec	1–0	FK SK Polanka nad Odrou
SK Beskyd Frenštát pod Radhoštěm	4–0	BFK Frýdlant nad Ostravicí
FK Šumperk	0–4	SK Uničov
TJ MILO Olomouc	1–4	TJ Start Brno
Tatran Ždírec nad Doubravou	1–0	AFC Humpolec
31 July 2024
SK Hořovice	1–0	FK Komárov
2 August 2024
FK Turnov	0–0 (4–2 p)	Slovan Hrádek nad Nisou
FC Rokycany	4–3	SK Senco Doubravka
3 August 2024
SK Hřebeč	1–0	SK Štětí
FK Olympie Březová	2–2 (6–5 p)	FK Baník Sokolov
TJ Sokol Pěnčín	2–2 (4–5 p)	FK Velké Hamry
FK Slavoj Český Krumlov	1–6	FK Benešov
FK Meteor Prague VIII	1–1 (3–0 p)	FK Neratovice–Byškovice
TJ Spartak Soběslav	3–0	TJ Hluboká nad Vltavou
RMSK Cidlina Nový Bydžov	1–2	FK Dobrovice
FK Slavoj Žatec	1–5	SK Slaný
FC Přední Kopanina	1–1 (3–4 p)	TJ Ligmet Milín
FK Česká Třebová	0–1	FK Horní Ředice
FK Ostrov	1–2	FC Viktoria Mariánské Lázně
SK Český Brod	3–1	SK Kosmonosy
SK Rapid Psáry	3–2	FK Brandýs nad Labem
SK Vysoké Mýto	4–0	FC Hlinsko
4 August 2024
Slavoj Koloveč	3–1	SK Slavia Vejprnice
MFK Trutnov	0–3	Spartak Police nad Metují
TJ Sokol Železnice	0–2	FC Slavia Hradec Králové

== First round ==
The draw was made on 6 August. The 46 winners from the preliminary round were joined by 40 clubs entering at this stage of the competition.

Team 1	Score	Team 2
13 August 2024
SK Slaný (4)	0–5	SK Sokol Brozany (3)
20 August 2024
SK Aritma Prague (4)	3–2	Sokol Hostouň (3)
FK Arsenal Česká Lípa (3)	2–0	SK Sparta Kolín (3)
FC Rokycany (4)	1–6	FK Příbram (3)
1. HFK Olomouc (4)	0–2	MFK Vyškov (2)
FC Kuřim (4)	1–0	TJ Start Brno (3)
21 August 2024
FK Velké Hamry (4)	0–3	SK Benátky nad Jizerou (3)
TJ Spartak Soběslav (4)	1–3	Povltavská fotbalová akademie (3)
FK Dobrovice (4)	1–5	FK Viktoria Žižkov (2)
SK Rapid Psáry (5)	2–10	FC Silon Táborsko (2)
FK Turnov (4)	0–4	SK Zápy (3)
FK Horní Ředice (4)	0–2	TJ Sokol Živanice (3)
FK Přepeře (4)	2–3	FK Varnsdorf (2)
TJ Ligmet Milín (4)	1–1 (4–3 p)	FC Sellier & Bellot Vlašim (2)
SK Hřebeč (4)	1–3	SK Kladno (3)
FK Meteor Prague VIII (4)	0–5	FK Viagem Ústí nad Labem (3)
SK Český Brod (4)	1–4	FK Admira Prague (3)
FK Králův Dvůr (4)	1–1 (3–4 p)	FK Loko Vltavín (3)
Slovan Velvary (3)	2–2 (2–3 p)	FK Motorlet Prague (3)
SK Hořovice (4)	w/o	TJ Přeštice (3)
FK Olympie Březová (4)	1–3	SK Petřín Plzeň (3)
Slavoj Koloveč (5)	0–7	TJ Jiskra Domažlice (3)
FC Viktoria Mariánské Lázně (4)	0–4	FK Baník Most-Souš (3)
SK Beskyd Frenštát pod Radhoštěm (4)	0–0 (5–3 p)	FC Zlínsko (3)
FC Kvasice (4)	1–3	FC Strání (3)
SK Jiskra Rýmařov (4)	0–6	SK Hanácká Slavia Kroměříž (3)
MFK Vítkovice (4)	2–0	FK Frýdek-Místek (3)
FK Kozlovice (4)	0–0 (8–9 p)	ČSK Uherský Brod (3)
Tatran Ždírec nad Doubravou (4)	0–4	SK Líšeň (2)
27 August 2024
FC ŽĎAS Žďár nad Sázavou (4)	2–2 (8–7 p)	FC Vysočina Jihlava (2)
SK Hranice (4)	1–2	FC Zlín (2)
SK Vysoké Mýto (4)	1–0	MFK Chrudim (2)
28 August 2024
FC Bílovec (4)	2–2 (3–2 p)	SK Uničov (3)
MFK Havířov (4)	2–2 (3–5 p)	FC Hlučín (3)
TJ Sokol Tasovice (4)	2–1	FC Slovan Rosice (3)
TJ Slovan Bzenec (4)	3–3 (5–4 p)	FK Hodonín (3)
29 August 2024
TJ Tatran Bohunice (4)	2–6	FC Zbrojovka Brno (2)
4 September 2024
FC Slavia Hradec Králové (4)	1–2	Ústí nad Orlicí (3)
FK Benešov (4)	1–3	FC Písek (3)
FC Vratimov (4)	0–4	SFC Opava (2)
FK Bospor Bohumín (4)	0–2	1. SK Prostějov (2)
11 September 2024
Spartak Police nad Metují (4)	2–0	FK Chlumec nad Cidlinou (3)
FC Slavia Karlovy Vary (4)	5–1	FC Chomutov (3)

== Second round ==
The 43 winners from the first round were joined by the 11 First League teams not playing in European competitions.

Team 1	Score	Team 2
24 September 2024
ČSK Uherský Brod (3)	2–1	1. SK Prostějov (2)
MFK Vítkovice (4)	0–3	FC Hlučín (3)
FK Viagem Ústí nad Labem (3)	4–4 (4–3 p)	SK Kladno (3)
25 September 2024
Ústí nad Orlicí (3)	0–4	FK Dukla Prague (1)
SK Petřín Plzeň (3)	0–2	FC Silon Táborsko (2)
SK Sokol Brozany (3)	1–3	Bohemians 1905 (1)
TJ Ligmet Milín (4)	0–2	FK Teplice (1)
TJ Sokol Živanice (3)	0–3	FK Varnsdorf (2)
FK Motorlet Prague (3)	0–1	FC Hradec Králové (1)
SK Aritma Prague (4)	0–3	FK Pardubice (1)
Povltavská fotbalová akademie (3)	1–3	FC Slovan Liberec (1)
FK Příbram (3)	2–2 (2–4 p)	SK Dynamo České Budějovice (1)
FC Písek (3)	0–4	FK Viktoria Žižkov (2)
Spartak Police nad Metují (4)	2–0	FC Slavia Karlovy Vary (4)
FK Baník Most-Souš (3)	1–1 (3–5 p)	SK Benátky nad Jizerou (3)
FK Loko Vltavín (3)	3–1	FK Arsenal Česká Lípa (3)
SK Vysoké Mýto (4)	1–1 (6–7 p)	SK Hořovice (4)
SK Zápy (3)	3–1	FK Admira Prague (3)
FC Kuřim (4)	1–3	1. FC Slovácko (1)
TJ Sokol Tasovice (4)	1–5	FC Zlín (2)
SK Beskyd Frenštát pod Radhoštěm (4)	1–3	FC Zbrojovka Brno (2)
FC Strání (3)	0–1	SFC Opava (2)
FC Bílovec (4)	1–3	MFK Vyškov (2)
FC ŽĎAS Žďár nad Sázavou (4)	1–2	SK Líšeň (2)
SK Hanácká Slavia Kroměříž (3)	1–0	MFK Karviná (1)
2 October 2024
TJ Jiskra Domažlice (3)	0–2	FK Jablonec (1)
TJ Slovan Bzenec (4)	0–6	SK Sigma Olomouc (1)

== Third round ==
The draw took place on 4 October 2024. The last entrants were the five clubs involved in the UEFA club competitions.

Team 1	Score	Team 2
23 October 2024
SK Hořovice (4)	0–6	FK Dukla Prague (1)
30 October 2024
FK Loko Vltavín (3)	0–1	FC Hradec Králové (1)
SK Zápy (3)	1–2	FK Pardubice (1)
SK Hanácká Slavia Kroměříž (3)	3–1	1. FC Slovácko (1)
Spartak Police nad Metují (4)	1–3	FK Mladá Boleslav (1)
FC Hlučín (3)	1–0	FC Slovan Liberec (1)
FK Viagem Ústí nad Labem (3)	3–4	FC Viktoria Plzeň (1)
FK Viktoria Žižkov (2)	0–2	SK Sigma Olomouc (1)
FK Varnsdorf (2)	1–3	FC Baník Ostrava (1)
AC Sparta Prague (1)	4–0	FC Zbrojovka Brno (2)
SK Líšeň (2)	1–3	FK Teplice (1)
MFK Vyškov (2)	0–1	Bohemians 1905 (1)
SFC Opava (2)	1–2	FC Zlín (2)
31 October 2024
SK Benátky nad Jizerou (3)	1–4	SK Slavia Prague (1)
5 November 2024
ČSK Uherský Brod (3)	0–1	FK Jablonec (1)
6 November 2024
FC Silon Táborsko (2)	2–0 (a.e.t.)	SK Dynamo České Budějovice (1)

== Fourth round ==
The draw took place on 21 November 2024.

Team 1	Score	Team 2
25 February 2025
AC Sparta Prague (1)	3–0	FK Dukla Prague (1)
26 February 2025
FK Mladá Boleslav (1)	0–2	Bohemians 1905 (1)
SK Slavia Prague (1)	1–0 (a.e.t.)	FC Silon Táborsko (2)
27 February 2025
FC Viktoria Plzeň (1)	4–1 (a.e.t.)	FC Zlín (2)
4 March 2025
SK Sigma Olomouc (1)	2 –1	SK Hanácká Slavia Kroměříž (3)
5 March 2025
FK Pardubice (1)	0–2	FC Baník Ostrava (1)
11 March 2025
FC Hlučín (3)	1–2	FK Teplice (1)
12 March 2025
FC Hradec Králové (1)	1–2	FK Jablonec (1)

== Quarter-finals ==
The draw took place on 13 March 2025.

8 April 2025	SK Slavia Prague	0–1	SK Sigma Olomouc	Prague
18:00			Kliment 28'	Stadium: Fortuna Arena

9 April 2025	FK Jablonec	0–1	FC Baník Ostrava	Jablonec nad Nisou
16:30			Rigo 64'	Stadium: Stadion Střelnice

9 April 2025	AC Sparta Prague	3–2 (a.e.t.)	FK Teplice	Prague
19:00	Sørensen 5'; Kuchta 76'; Haraslín 117'		Takács 40'; Trubač 89' (pen.)	Stadium: Stadion Letná

10 April 2025	Bohemians 1905	1–3	FC Viktoria Plzeň	Prague
	Čermák 64'		Vydra 54'; Šulc 75' (pen.); Valenta 90+6'	Stadium: Ďolíček

== Semi-finals ==
22 April 2025	FC Baník Ostrava	2–3	SK Sigma Olomouc	Ostrava
19:00	Šín 24'; Rigo 57'		Zorvan 45+1', 64' (pen.); Dolžnikov 54'	Stadium: Městský stadion

23 April 2025	AC Sparta Prague	1–0	FC Viktoria Plzeň	Prague
19:00	J. Zelený 19'			Stadium: Stadion Letná

== Final ==
The final took place on 14 May 2025 at Andrův stadion in Olomouc. Sigma Olomouc held a 3–0 lead at half time, with two goals from Filip Zorvan and one from Matěj Mikulenka. In the second half, video referee Kocourek indicated a penalty for Sparta due to a handball committed by Sigma player Jan Navrátil. Albion Rrahmani converted the penalty but there were no further goals, with the final score 3–1 to Sigma Olomouc, who won the cup.

14 May 2025
18:00

SK Sigma Olomouc	3–1	AC Sparta Prague
Zorvan 4', 45'; Mikulenka 45+2'		Rrahmani 61' (pen.)

Andrův stadion, Olomouc
Attendance: 12,014
Referee: Karel Rouček

Sigma Olomouc	Sparta Prague

GK	91	(Czech Republic) Jan Koutný	Booked
RB	13	(Czech Republic) Jiří Sláma
CB	21	(Czech Republic) Jan Král
CB	38	(Czech Republic) Jakub Pokorný	Booked
LB	34	(Czech Republic) Matěj Hadaš
DM	7	(Czech Republic) Radim Breite (c)	Booked
DM	37	(Czech Republic) Štěpán Langer	Booked
MF	47	(Lithuania) Artūr Dolžnikov		(substituted off) 70'
MF	10	(Czech Republic) Filip Zorvan
MF	30	(Czech Republic) Jan Navrátil		(substituted off) 78'
CF	25	(Czech Republic) Matěj Mikulenka		(substituted off) 78'
Substitutes:
DF	4	(Czech Republic) Jakub Elbel		(substituted on) 78'
DF	20	(Slovakia) Juraj Chvátal		(substituted on) 70'
FW	18	(Czech Republic) Jan Fiala		(substituted on) 78'
Manager:
(Czech Republic) Tomáš Janotka

GK	44	(Slovakia) Jakub Surovčík
DF	19	(Czech Republic) Adam Ševínský	Booked
DF	27	(Czech Republic) Filip Panák (c)		(substituted off) 69'
DF	41	(Czech Republic) Martin Vitík
MF	30	(Czech Republic) Jaroslav Zelený
MF	26	(Czech Republic) Patrik Vydra	Booked	(substituted off) 58'
MF	18	(Albania) Qazim Laçi
MF	2	(Czech Republic) Lukáš Sadílek		(substituted off) 46'
MF	19	(Czech Republic) Martin Suchomel		(substituted off) 58'
FW	10	(Czech Republic) Jan Kuchta	Booked
FW	22	(Slovakia) Lukáš Haraslín		(substituted off) 46'
Substitutes:
DF	17	(Ecuador) Ángelo Preciado	Booked	(substituted on) 58'
MF	6	(Finland) Kaan Kairinen		(substituted on) 58'
MF	29	(Kosovo) Ermal Krasniqi		(substituted on) 69'
FW	7	(Nigeria) Victor Olatunji		(substituted on) 46'
FW	9	(Kosovo) Albion Rrahmani	Booked	(substituted on) 46'
Manager:
(Denmark) Lars Friis

Match officials

- Assistant referees:
  - Jiří Kříž
  - Lukáš Machač
- Video assistant referee:
  - Tomáš Kocourek
