= 2022–23 Czech Cup =

MOL Cup

Tournament details
- Country: Czech Republic
- Teams: 103

Final positions
- Champions: Slavia Prague (7th title)
- Runners-up: Sparta Prague

The 2022–23 Czech Cup, known as the MOL Cup for sponsorship reasons, was the 30th season of the annual knockout football tournament of the Czech Republic. It began with the preliminary round on 22 July 2022. The winner qualified for the third round of 2023–24 Europe League.

== Extra preliminary round ==
Team 1	Score	Team 2
22 July 2022
TJ Sokol Kateřinice	2–8	FC Vsetín
23 July 2022
FC Dolany	2–1	FK Šternberk
TJ Nová Ves u N. M. na Moravě	1–2	FC ŽĎAS Žďár nad Sázavou

== Preliminary round ==
Team 1	Score	Team 2
29 July 2022
FC TVD Slavičín	1–5	SK Kvítkovice
FK Nový Jičín	5–0	FK Nové Sady
AFC Humpolec	1–3	TJ Dálnice Speřice
SK Slaný	0–1	Sokol Hostouň
FC Slovan Havlíčkův Brod	2–3	FC Velké Meziříčí
TJ Start Brno	1–1 (6–5 p)	1. SC Znojmo FK
FC Rokycany	1–0	FC Komárov
SK Baťov	0–5	ČSK Uherský Brod
30 July 2022
FC Vsetín	1–2 (a.e.t.)	TJ Valašské Meziříčí
FK Olympie Březová	5–2	FK Baník Sokolov
SK Štětí	3–6	FK Dobrovice
SK Újezd Prague 4	4–2	SK Petřín Plzeň
FK Neratovice-Býškovice s.r.o.	2–2 (0–1 p)	FK Čáslav, a.s.
SK Kladno	1–0	FK Zbuzany
MSK Břeclav	1–3	TJ Sokol Tasovice
FK Slavoj Český Krumlov	0–1	SK Benešov
TJ Unie Hlubina	1–3	MFK Vítkovice
SK Jankov	1–3	TJ Spartak Soběslav
FK Turnov	3–2	SK STAP-TRATEC Vilémov
TJ Tatran Rousínov	0–4	TJ Slovan Bzenec
TJ Břidličná	1–3	FK Šumperk
1. HFK Olomouc	0–5	FK Kozlovice
SK Bystřive nad Pernštejnem	2–6	FC Slovan Rosice
1. FC Viktorie Přerov	5–3 (a.e.t.)	TJ Skaštice
FK Krnov	0–7	FC Hlučín
Tatran Všechovice	3–0	1. BFK Frýdlant nad Ostravicí
TJ Sokol Kralovice	2–5 (a.e.t.)	SK Klatovy 1898
FC Dolany	0–0 (2–4 p)	SK Jiskra Rýmařov
FC ŽĎAS Žďár nad Sázavou	3–0	FC PBS Velká Bíteš
SK Tatran Ždírec nad Doubravou	5–0	FSC Stará Říše
FK Náchod	0–0 (6–7 p)	TJ Velké Hamry
SK Libčany	1–0	FC Hlinsko
SK Beskyd Frenštát pod Radhoštěm	1–4	FK Frýdek-Místek
FK Seko Louny	0–2	FK Baník Most-Souš
FC Libišany	4–1	SK Vysoké Mýto }
SK Tochovice	0–5	FK Králův Dvůr
SK Hořovice	0–3	TJ Přeštice
FC Nový Bor	0–7	FK Arsenal Česká Lípa
SFK ELKO Holešov	2–2 (3–4 p)	SK Hranice
FK Bospor Bohumín	5–2	MFK Havířov
TJ Karlovy Vary-Dvory	1–1 (2–4 p)	FK Hvězda Cheb
31 July 2022
TJ Sokol Lanžhot	0–3	FK Hodonín
MFK Trutnov	0–4	TJ Jiskra Ústí nad Orlicí
RMSK Cidlina Nový Bydžov	3–1	TJ Dvůr Králové nad Labem
FK SK Polanka nad Odrou	1–2	FK Bílovec
TJ Tatran Bohunice	1–0	FK Blansko
2 August 2022
FC Slavoj Olympia Bruntál	0–1	SK Uničov
3 August 2022
TJ Sokol Libiš	5–3	SK Sparta Kolín
SK Hřebeč	5–1	FK Brandýs nad Labem

== First round ==
Team 1	Score	Team 2
10 August 2022
1. FC Viktorie Přerov	1–4	1. SK Prostějov
16 August 2022
SK Hranice	2–2 (1–4 p)	MFK Karviná
ČSK Uherský Brod	1–3	MFK Vyškov
SK Aritma Prague	3–2 (a.e.t.)	FK Olympie Březová
17 August 2022
FK Šumperk	0–1	SK Uničov
TJ Slovan Bzenec	2–1 (a.e.t.)	TJ Tatran Bohunice
TJ Sokol Libiš	1–9	FC Sellier & Bellot Vlašim
SK Klatovy 1898	1–5	FK Viagem Příbram
FC ŽĎAS Žďár nad Sázavou	2–4	FC Vysočina Jihlava
TJ Sokol Tasovice	5–4 (a.e.t.)	FK Hodonín
FK Nový Jičín	0–2	SK Hanácká Slavia Kroměříž
SK Sokol Brozany	1–3	FK Varnsdorf
Tatran Všechovice	2–0	TJ Valašské Meziříčí
SK Tatran Ždírec nad Doubravou	1–1 (4–5 p)	SK Líšeň
RMSK Cidlina Nový Bydžov	1–2	FK Přepeře
SK Libčany	3–2	SK Český Brod
FK Dobrovice	1–5	FK Ústí nad Labem
TJ Start Brno	3–1	FC Velké Meziříčí
SK Benešov	0–1	FC Silon Táborsko
FK Králův Dvůr	2–1 (a.e.t.)	TJ Jiskra Domažlice
SK Otava Katovice	1–3	TJ Přeštice
FK Hvězda Cheb	2–3	FC Viktoria Mariánské Lázně
FC Chomutov	4–1	FC Slavia Karlovy Vary
TJ Dálnice Speřice	0–4	FC Slovan Rosice
FK Bílovec	2–6	FK Fotbal Třinec
FC Libišany	5–1	FK Letohrad
TJ Jiskra Ústí nad Orlicí	3–2	TJ Sokol Živanice
FK Kozlovice	2–3 (a.e.t.)	FK Frýdek-Místek
TJ Spartak Soběslav	3–0	FC Písek
FK Bospor Bohumín	0–3	FC Hlučín
MFK Vítkovice	2–4	SK Kvítkovice
FK Baník Most-Souš	2–1	FK Admira Prague
TJ Velké Hamry	2–4	FK Chlumec nad Cidlinou
Povltavská fotbalová akademie	0–1	MFK Chrudim
FK Motorlet Prague	3–2 (a.e.t.)	SK Újezd Prague 4
SK Hřebeč	1–3	SK Zápy
FK Arsenal Česká Lípa	3–4	SK Benátky nad Jizerou
FC Rokycany	1–0 (a.e.t.)	SK Kladno
FK Čáslav, a.s.	2–0	FK Loko Vltavín
FK Turnov	1–5	Slovan Velvary
SK Kosmonosy	0–3	FK Viktoria Žižkov
23 August 2022
SK Jiskra Rýmařov	0–9	SFC Opava
24 August 2022
Sokol Hostouň	0–3	FK Dukla Prague

== Second round ==
The draw took place on 26 August 2022.

Team 1	Score	Team 2
13 September 2022
SK Kvítkovice	1–5	FK Fotbal Třinec
SK Uničov	2–4 (a.e.t.)	SK Sigma Olomouc
14 September 2022
FK Viktoria Žižkov	1–2 (a.e.t.)	FK Teplice
Slovan Velvary	1–0	FK Pardubice
FK Přepeře	0–1 (a.e.t.)	FC Silon Táborsko
FC Rokycany	1–5	FC Slovan Liberec
FK Motorlet Prague	0–4	FK Jablonec
TJ Start Brno	0–3	FC Trinity Zlín
FC Slovan Rosice	0–4	FC Zbrojovka Brno
FK Frýdek-Místek	2–0	SFC Opava
SK Libčany	1–3	FK Dukla Prague
SK Zápy	2–1	MFK Chrudim
TJ Jiskra Ústí nad Orlicí	0–1	FK Chlumec nad Cidlinou
TJ Spartak Soběslav	3–1	FK Robstav Přeštice
TJ Jiskra Domažlice	4–1	SK Aritma Prague
TJ Sokol Tasovice	2–2 (2–3 p)	1. SK Prostějov
FC Hlučín	2–0	SK Líšeň
Tatran Všechovice	2–9	MFK Vyškov
20 September 2022
FC Viktoria Mariánské Lázně	2–3	FK Viagem Příbram
21 September 2022
FC Libišany	1–3 (a.e.t.)	FC Vysočina Jihlava
SK Hanácká Slavia Kroměříž	3–3 (1–4 p)	FC Baník Ostrava
SK Benátky nad Jizerou	1–2	FK Varnsdorf
FK Baník Most-Souš	1–4	FC Sellier & Bellot Vlašim
FK Čáslav	0–11	FC Hradec Králové
TJ Slovan Bzenec	1–2	MFK Karviná
FK Ústí nad Labem	0–3	Bohemians 1905
FK Chomutov	0–5	SK Dynamo České Budějovice

== Third round ==
The draw took place on 23 September 2022.

Team 1	Score	Team 2
11 October 2022
FK Jablonec	0–1	MFK Vyškov
18 October 2022
TJ Spartak Soběslav	0–2	MFK Karviná
FK Viagem Příbram	0–3	FK Teplice
19 October 2022
Slovan Velvary	0–2	FC Baník Ostrava
FC Hlučín	3–2	FC Viktoria Plzeň
TJ Jiskra Domažlice	1–6	AC Sparta Prague
SK Zápy	1–3	SK Sigma Olomouc
FK Chlumec nad Cidlinou	0–4	FC Hradec Králové
FK Dukla Prague	0–4	SK Slavia Prague
SK Dynamo České Budějovice	3–1	FC Sellier & Bellot Vlašim
FK Mladá Boleslav	4–0	1. SK Prostějov
Bohemians 1905	2–1	FK Třinec
1. FC Slovácko	6–0	FK Varnsdorf
FC Silon Táborsko	1–2	FC Zbrojovka Brno
25 October 2022
FK Frýdek-Místek	0–6	FC Slovan Liberec
FC Trinity Zlín	2–0	FC Vysočina Jihlava

== Fourth round ==
The draw took place on 31 October 2022.

Team 1	Score	Team 2
17 November 2022
FK Teplice	2–3 (a.e.t.)	FC Zbrojovka Brno
FC Trinity Zlín	0–1	MFK Vyškov
18 November 2022
MFK Karviná	0–2	SK Slavia Prague
1. FC Slovácko	1–0	FK Mladá Boleslav
19 November 2022
FC Baník Ostrava	2–3	AC Sparta Prague
Bohemians 1905	3–0	FC Hlučín
26 November 2022
FC Slovan Liberec	4–1	SK Sigma Olomouc
1 February 2023
SK Dynamo České Budějovice	2–0	FC Hradec Králové

== Quarter-finals ==
1 March 2023	1. FC Slovácko	1–2	Bohemians 1905	Uherské Hradiště
17:00	Hofmann 23'		Čermák 41'; Hůlka 90+1'	Stadium: Městský fotbalový stadion Miroslava Valenty; Attendance: 4,165; Referee: Miroslav Zelinka

1 March 2023	FC Slovan Liberec	2–2 (a.e.t.) (3–5 p)	AC Sparta Prague	Liberec
17:00	Rondić 4'; Rabušic 90+2'		Kuchta 76', 82'	Stadium: Stadion u Nisy; Attendance: 3,258; Referee: Ladislav Szikszay
	Penalties
	Rabušic (penalty scored); Olatunji (penalty scored); Červ (penalty missed); Mészáros (penalty scored)		(penalty scored) Karabec; (penalty scored) Krejčí II; (penalty scored) Kairinen; (penalty scored) Sørensen; (penalty scored) Kuchta

1 March 2023	SK Dynamo České Budějovice	2–1	FC Zbrojovka Brno	České Budějovice
17:00	Zajíc 18', 43'		Divíšek 90+2'	Stadium: Stadion Střelecký ostrov Attendance: 952; Referee: Petr Hocek

1 March 2023	SK Slavia Prague	4–0	MFK Vyškov	Prague
18:00	Lingr 12'; Jurečka 19', 62'; Jurásek 22'			Stadium: Fortuna Arena; Attendance: 6,697; Referee: Dominik Starý

== Semi-finals ==
5 April 2023	AC Sparta Prague	2–0	SK Dynamo České Budějovice	Prague
18:00	Minchev 37'; Sadílek 76'			Stadium: epet ARENA; Attendance: 11,562; Referee: Petr Hocek

5 April 2023	SK Slavia Prague	3–2 (a.e.t.)	Bohemians 1905	Prague
20:15	Douděra 23'; Lingr 90+7'; Jurečka 110'		Prekop 14'; Hála 84'	Stadium: Fortuna Arena; Attendance: 16,087; Referee: Dalibor Černý

== Final ==
3 May 2023	AC Sparta Prague	0–2	SK Slavia Prague	Prague
19:00			Douděra 59'; Panák 64' (o.g.)	Stadium: epet ARENA; Attendance: 17,037; Referee: Dalibor Černý
