= 2023–24 Czech Cup =

MOL Cup

Tournament details
- Country: Czech Republic

Final positions
- Champions: AC Sparta Prague (8th title)
- Runners-up: FC Viktoria Plzeň

The 2023–24 Czech Cup, known as the MOL Cup for sponsorship reasons, is the 31st season of the annual knockout football tournament of the Czech Republic. The winners qualify for the third qualifying round of the 2024–25 UEFA Europa League.

In the first round 1. SK Prostějov recorded the competition's record win as they defeated lower-league side Řepiště, 26–0.

== Extra preliminary round ==
Fourteen teams took part in the extra preliminary round.

== Preliminary round ==
46 games were played in the preliminary round. The 7 winners of the previous round were joined in the draw by 85 entrants.

Team 1	Score	Team 2
28 July 2023
TJ Slovan Bzenec	0–3	TJ Sokol Lanžhot
AFC Humpolec	1–3	FC ŽĎAS Žďár nad Sázavou
SK Baťov 1930	2–4	FK Hodonín
FC TVD Slavičín	0–1	FC Zlínsko
FC Slavia Hradec Králové	2–0	SK Vysoké Mýto
SK Hořovice	1–2	Sokol Hostouň
29 July 2023
SK Beskyd Frenštát pod Radhoštěm	1–2	MFK Vítkovice
TJ Velké Hamry	6–1	MFK Trutnov
TJ Spoje Prague	1–3	SK Benátky nad Jizerou
SK Petřín Plzeň	2–1	FK Hvězda Cheb
TJ SK Hřebeč	3–4 (a.e.t.)	SK Újezd Prague 4
FK Olympie Březová	4–5 (a.e.t.)	FC Viktoria Mariánské Lázně
FK Robstav Přeštice	8–0	FK Ostrov
FK SK Polanka nad Odrou	0–1	FC Hlučín
TJ Sokol Nespeky	2–0	FK Komárov
FC Bílovec	0–3	FK Frýdek-Místek
FC Kostelec na Hané	0–8	TJ Tatran Bohunice
TJ Břidličná	0–6	SK Uničov
FC Tempo Prague	2–3	SK Kladno
FK Tachov	1–3	SK Klatovy 1898
TJ Skaštice	0–3	FC Slovan Rosice
SK Jiskra Rýmařov	3–2 (a.e.t.)	FK Krnov
FK Rokycany	1–2 (a.e.t.)	SK Senco Doubravka
FK Nové Sady	5–3	FK Blansko
FC Libišany	3–9	RMSK Cidlina Nový Bydžov
FK Letohrad	0–2	FC Hlinsko
TJ Spartak Chrastava	0–2	FK Turnov
FC Chomutov	3–1	SK Aritma Prague
SFK ELKO Holešov	2–1	ČSK Uherský Brod
TJ Tatran Všechovice	0–1	SK Hranice
FC Vsetín	7–1	TJ Valašské Meziříčí
30 July 2023
TJ Řepiště	3–1	FK Nový Jičín
FK Jeseník	0–2	FK Šumperk
FC Kuřim	1–2	SFK Nové Město na Moravě
TJ Sokol Čechovice	1–5	FK Kozlovice
TJ Sokol Tasovice	3–5	TJ Start Brno
FC Strání	5–3	MSK Břeclav
FSC Stará Říše	0–2 (a.e.t.)	1. SC Znojmo FK
TJ Dálnice Speřice	0–2	SK Tatran Ždírec nad Doubravou
Spartak Průhonice	0–6	SK Benešov
FK Pelhřimov	0–2	FC Slovan Havlíčkův Brod
SK Baník Modlany	2–2 (13–14 p)	SK Štětí
TJ Hluboká nad Vltavou	1–1 (3–4 p)	TJ Spartak Soběslav
TJ Unie Hlubina	2–1	1. BFK Frýdlant nad Ostravicí
MFK Havířov	2–1	FK Bospor Bohumín
SK Český Brod	2–0	SK Slaný

== First round ==
43 matches were played in the first round. The 46 winners from the previous round were joined in the draw by 40 entrants.

Team 1	Score	Team 2
2 August 2023
FK Turnov	1–2	FK Arsenal Česká Lípa
8 August 2023
TJ Sokol Lanžhot	2–2 (5–2 p)	TJ Start Brno
SK Senco Doubravka	1–4	TJ Jiskra Domažlice
SK Tatran Ždírec nad Doubravou	1–4	FC Zbrojovka Brno
9 August 2023
TJ Řepiště	0–26	1. SK Prostějov
FC Chomutov	0–2	SK Sokol Brozany
SK Petřín Plzeň	2–1	FK Robstav Přeštice
MFK Vítkovice	0–4	FK Třinec
SK Benátky nad Jizerou	0–3	SK Zápy
SK Otava Katovice	1–2	FK Příbram
FK Neratovice–Byškovice	0–1	FK Baník Most-Souš
FK Brandýs nad Labem	0–2	FK Chlumec nad Cidlinou
TJ Sokol Nespeky	6–3 (a.e.t.)	FK Motorlet Prague
FK Slavoj Český Krumlov	0–7	FC Sellier & Bellot Vlašim
FC Slovan Havlíčkův Brod	0–8	FC Vysočina Jihlava
SK Český Brod	0–3	FK Loko Vltavín
SK Újezd Prague 4	0–1	Slovan Velvary
SK Klatovy 1898	1–6	FC Silon Táborsko
SK Štětí	2–3	FK Viagem Ústí nad Labem
Sokol Hostouň	1–4	FK Dukla Prague
FK Čáslav	1–2 (a.e.t.)	FK Admira Prague
FC Viktoria Mariánské Lázně	4–0	FC Slavia Karlovy Vary
MFK Havířov	0–2	TJ Unie Hlubina
SFK ELKO Holešov	4–1	FK Nové Sady
FC Slavia Hradec Králové	0–2	MFK Chrudim
FC Vsetín	3–1	FK Kozlovice
FC Hlinsko	1–0	TJ Sokol Živanice
FK Hodonín	2–2 (3–5 p)	MFK Vyškov
SK Kladno	1–0	FK Králův Dvůr
15 August 2023
SK Jiskra Rýmařov	0–4	FC Hlučín
FK Šumperk	1–5	SFC Opava
FC Zlínsko	3–1	FK Frýdek-Místek
16 August 2023
SK Kosmonosy	1–4	FK Varnsdorf
FC ŽĎAS Žďár nad Sázavou	0–3	1. SC Znojmo FK
FC Strání	1–0	FC Slovan Rosice
SFK Nové Město na Moravě	1–3	SK Líšeň
TJ Velké Hamry	2–1 (a.e.t.)	FK Přepeře
SK Benešov	1–2	Povltavská fotbalová akademie
TJ Spartak Soběslav	1–0	FC Písek
RMSK Cidlina Nový Bydžov	0–1	SK Sparta Kolín
TJ Tatran Bohunice	2–4 (a.e.t.)	SK Hanácká Slavia Kroměříž
22 August 2023
SK Hranice	0–1	SK Uničov
23 August 2023
TJ Jiskra Ústí nad Orlicí	0–5	FK Viktoria Žižkov

== Second round ==
The draw for the second round took place on 14 August. 27 matches were scheduled, involving the 43 winners from the previous round, as well as 11 entrants.

Team 1	Score	Team 2
29 August 2023
SFK ELKO Holešov	0–7	SFC Opava
TJ Velké Hamry	1–3 (a.e.t.)	SK Dynamo České Budějovice
TJ Sokol Nespeky	1–6	FC Vysočina Jihlava
FC Zlínsko	1–5	MFK Vyškov
FC Hlučín	0–2	FC Baník Ostrava
30 August 2023
FK Třinec	1–4	SK Sigma Olomouc
TJ Jiskra Domažlice	2–0 (a.e.t.)	FK Příbram
FK Mladá Boleslav	4–2	FK Viagem Ústí nad Labem
FK Baník Most-Souš	0–3	FK Pardubice
TJ Sokol Lanžhot	0–1	FC Zlín
FC Vsetín	0–4	FC Zbrojovka Brno
TJ Unie Hlubina	0–8	1. FC Slovácko
SK Sparta Kolín	3–1	FK Chlumec nad Cidlinou
FC Strání	1–2	SK Hanácká Slavia Kroměříž
SK Sokol Brozany	3–4	FK Teplice
5 September 2023
FK Admira Prague	1–5	FK Jablonec
1. SC Znojmo FK	2–4	1. SK Prostějov
6 September 2023
FK Loko Vltavín	0–3	FK Dukla Prague
SK Zápy	1–0	FC Silon Táborsko
FK Arsenal Česká Lípa	1–2	MFK Chrudim
SK Kladno	2–1	FK Varnsdorf
FC Hlinsko	1–2 (a.e.t.)	SK Líšeň
SK Petřín Plzeň	0–1	FC Viktoria Mariánské Lázně
SK Uničov	1–0	MFK Karviná
TJ Spartak Soběslav	2–4	FC Hradec Králové
Povltavská fotbalová akademie	1–6	FK Viktoria Žižkov
20 September 2023
Slovan Velvary	1–1 (5–4 p)	FC Sellier & Bellot Vlašim

== Third round ==
The draw took place on 15 September 2023. The last entrants are the five clubs involved into the European Cups.

Team 1	Score	Team 2
26 September 2023
SK Kladno	0–2	FC Slovan Liberec
FK Mladá Boleslav	4–2	1. SK Prostějov
27 September 2023
SFC Opava	3–2	FC Zbrojovka Brno
SK Zápy	1–2	FC Baník Ostrava
TJ Jiskra Domažlice	1–1 (4–5 p)	FK Jablonec
SK Hanácká Slavia Kroměříž	0–2	SK Slavia Prague
MFK Vyškov	1–0	FK Teplice
SK Líšeň 2019	0–1	AC Sparta Prague
1. FC Slovácko	3–4	FK Dukla Prague
FC Vysočina Jihlava	0–1	FC Hradec Králové
TJ Slovan Velvary	1–1 (5–4 p)	FK Pardubice
10 October 2023
SK Dynamo České Budějovice	2–0	MFK Chrudim
11 October 2023
FK Viktoria Žižkov	0–1	SK Sigma Olomouc
SK Uničov	1–2	FC Zlín
SK Sparta Kolín	1–7	Bohemians 1905
12 October 2023
FC Viktoria Mariánské Lázně	0–10	FC Viktoria Plzeň

== Fourth round ==
The draw took place on 12 October 2023.

Team 1	Score	Team 2
1 November 2023
FC Slovan Liberec	1–0	FK Mladá Boleslav
FK Dukla Prague	3–1	MFK Vyškov
FC Baník Ostrava	0–1	FC Zlín
Bohemians 1905	1–2	AC Sparta Prague
16 November 2023
SK Dynamo České Budějovice	1–2	FK Jablonec
SK Sigma Olomouc	1–3	FC Viktoria Plzeň
17 November 2023
TJ Slovan Velvary	1–2	SFC Opava
6 December 2023
FC Hradec Králové	0–2 (a.e.t.)	SK Slavia Prague

== Quarter-finals ==
25 February 2024	SFC Opava	2–0	FK Dukla Prague	Opava
14:00	Blecha 36'; Přichystal 39'			Stadium: Stadion v Městských sadech Attendance: 3,125; Referee: Michael Kvítek

28 February 2024	FC Zlín	2–1 (a.e.t.)	FC Slovan Liberec	Zlín
17:00	Schánělec 11'; Janetzký 91'		Pourzitidis 83'	Stadium: Stadion Letná; Attendance: 2,466; Referee: Vít Zaoral

28 February 2024	SK Slavia Prague	2–3 (a.e.t.)	AC Sparta Prague	Prague
18:00	Schranz 39'; Diouf 48'		Olatunji 55', 70'; Karabec 113' (pen.)	Stadium: Fortuna Arena; Attendance: 19,223; Referee: Karel Rouček

2 April 2024	FK Jablonec	0–3	FC Viktoria Plzeň	Jablonec nad Nisou
18:00			Tekijaški 34' (o.g.); Kopic 36'; Souaré 65'	Stadium: Stadion Střelnice; Attendance: 2,011; Referee: Marek Radina

== Semi-finals ==
3 April 2024	SFC Opava	0–2	AC Sparta Prague	Opava
18:00			Kuchta 44'; Olatunji 81'	Stadium: Stadion v Městských sadech Attendance: 6,583; Referee: Petr Hocek

24 April 2024	FC Viktoria Plzeň	3–0	FC Zlín	Plzeň
18:00	Chorý 6', 58'; Červ 32'			Stadium: Doosan Arena; Attendance: 7,584; Referee: Karel Rouček

== Final ==
22 May 2024	FC Viktoria Plzeň	1–2	AC Sparta Prague	Plzeň
18:00	Chorý 87'		Dweh 79' (o.g.); Birmančević 90+1'	Stadium: Doosan Arena; Attendance: 10,647; Referee: Ondřej Berka
