= 2026–27 Czech Cup =

MOL Cup

Tournament details
- Country: Czech Republic

The 2026–27 Czech Cup, known as the MOL Cup for sponsorship reasons, was the 34th season of the annual knockout football tournament of the Czech Republic. The winners qualified for the 2027–28 UEFA Europa League. Karviná were the defending cup holders, but lost in the second round to Czech Fourth Division side FK Kozlovice.

Times up to 24 October 2026 and from 28 March 2027 are CEST (UTC+2). Times from 25 October 2026 to 27 March 2027 are CET (UTC+1).

== Second preliminary round ==
The first preliminary round was not held. The draw was made on 5 July.

Team 1	Score	Team 2
24 July 2026
MFK Kravaře	1–6	FK Bospor Bohumín
FC Strání	1–2	FC Fastav Vsetín
TJ Tatran Všechovice	1–1 (4–2 p)	TJ Unie Hlubina
25 July 2026
TJ Tatran Bohunice	1–1 (4–5 p)	ČSK Uherský Brod
FC Vratimov	1–1 (3–4 p)	MFK Havířov
FK Blansko	1–1 (3–4 p)	FC PBS Velká Bíteš
FC Sparta Brno	1–0	SFK Vrchovina Nové Město
TJ Břidličná	1–0	FC Hlučín
TJ Sokol Lanžhot	1–0	FC Dosta Bystrc-Kníničky
TJ Sokol Horní Bečva	0–1	TJ Valašské Meziříčí
FK Bzenec-Vracov	1–0	MSK Břeclav
SFK ELKO Holešov	1–3	FC TVD Slavičín
FK Šternberk	1–1 (5–3 p)	SK Jiskra Rýmařov
SK Stonava	1–1 (1–3 p)	FK SK Polanka nad Odrou
TJ Spartak Hluk	2–3	FC Brumov
26 July 2026
SK Tatran Ždírec nad Doubravou	1–1 (3–4 p)	FC Kuřim
SK Fotbalová škola Třebíč	0–1	TJ Sokol Tasovice
FK Nové Sady	2–1	FK Prumrent Šumperk
SK Krumvíř	2–1	1. SC Znojmo FK
FC Chotěboř	2–0	FC Velké Meziříčí
FK Bílovec	0–1	MFK Vítkovice
TJ Sokol Bělotín	4–0	FK Nový Jičín
TJ Sokol Bedřichov	1–3	AFC Humpolec
SK Olympia Ráječko	4–1	FC Žďas Žďár nad Sázavou
FK Kozlovice	0–0 (5–3 p)	FK Frýdek-Místek
SK Sulko Zábřeh	2–2 (5–4 p)	SK Hranice
TJ Bystřice	1–2	1. BFK Frýdlant nad Ostravicí
29 July 2026
FSC Stará Říše	0–4	FC Slovan Havlíčkův Brod
30 July 2026
TJ Hluboká nad Vltavou	3–2	TJ Spartak Soběslav
31 July 2026
FC Rokycany	1–0	SK Hořovice
FC Slavoj Vyšehrad	0–2	Sokol Hostouň
TJ Viktoria Vestec	2–4	FK Benešov
1 August 2026
SK Petřín Plzeň	2–3	FK Komárov
FC Slavia Hradec Králové	1–2	MFK Trutnov
SK Slavia Vejprnice	2–2 (4–5 p)	SK Senco Doubravka
ABC Braník	1–4	FK Meteor Prague VIII
TJ Jiskra Ústí nad Orlicí	2–1	TJ Svitavy
FK Přepeře	3–0	TJ Velké Hamry
FK Klášterec nad Ohří	4–3	FK Ostrov
FK Okula Nýrsko	0–6	FK Křimice
TJ FC Pěnčín	0–3	FK Turnov
SK Strakonice 1908	2–1	FC ZVVZ Milevsko
FK Čechie Vykáň	4–3	FK Čáslav
TJ Slovan Velvary	0–1	FK Brandýs nad Labem
FC Tempo Prague	2–3	FK Loko Prague
SK Sparta Kolín	0–3	FK Horní Ředice
SK Spartak Příbram	2–2 (4–1 p)	Povltavská Fotbalová Akademie
SK Rapid Psáry	2–3	FK Motorlet Prague
FC Spartak Rychnov nad Kněžnou	0–2	FK Chlumec nad Cidlinou
SK Štěti	0–6	FK Varnsdorf
FK Hvězda Cheb	0–3	FK Baník Sokolov
SK Slavia České Budějovice	1–5	FK Slavoj Český Krumlov
FK Jiskra Heřmanův Měštec	3–0	FC Hlinsko
SK Kosmonosy	1–4	FK Neratovice-Byškovice
SK Slaný	0–2	SK Sokol Brozany
2 August 2026
TJ Dvůr Králové nad Labem	1–2	Spartak Police nad Metuji
FC Slavia Karlovy Vary	1–1 (2–0 p)	FC Chomutov
SK Vysoké Mýto	8–1	FK Letohrad

== First round ==
The draw was made on 24 July. The 58 winners from the second preliminary round were joined by 26 clubs entering at this stage of the competition.

Team 1	Score	Team 2
11 August 2026
TJ Valašské Meziříčí (4)	1–2	SK Uničov (3)
FC Kuřim (4)	0–7	1. SK Prostějov (2)
SK Vysoké Mýto (4)	2–4	FC Sellier & Bellot Vlašim (2)
TJ Hluboká nad Vltavou (4)	1–0	SK Aritma Prague (3)
Sokol Hostouň (4)	0–4	SK Kladno (2)
FK Čechie Vykáň (4)	0–3	FK Dukla Prague (2)
12 August 2026
FK Bospor Bohumín (4)	1–2	FK Třinec (2)
FC Sparta Brno (4)	2–0	TJ Sokol Lanžhot (4)
FK Šternberk (4)	1–5	FK SK Polanka nad Odrou (3)
TJ Břidličná (4)	2–2 (1–4 p)	TJ Tatran Všechovice (4)
FC Brumov (4)	0–4	MFK Karviná (2)
FK Bzenec-Vracov (4)	2–0	FK Hodonín (3)
TJ Sokol Tasovice (4)	2–3	ČSK Uherský Brod (3)
AFC Humpolec (4)	0–2	FC PBS Velká Bíteš (4)
1. BFK Frýdlant nad Ostravicí (4)	1–1 (5–4 p)	SFC Opava (2)
FC Chotěboř (4)	1–6	FC Fastav Vsetín (3)
TJ Sokol Bělotín (5)	1–3	MFK Havířov (3)
SK Krumvíř (4)	0–3	SK Hanácká Slavia Kroměříž (2)
FK Nové Sady (4)	0–6	MFK Vítkovice (3)
SK Olympia Ráječko (5)	2–5	SK Sulko Zábřeh (4)
FC Slovan Havlíčkův Brod (4)	1–5	FC Vysočina Jihlava (2)
FK Benešov (3)	0–1	FC Silon Táborsko (2)
FK Komárov (4)	3–6	TJ Jiskra Domažlice (3)
MFK Trutnov (4)	2–5	SK Benátky nad Jizerou (3)
FK Křimice (4)	2–0	SK Dynamo České Budějovice (3)
FK Přepeře (4)	4–3	TJ Jiskra Ústí nad Orlicí (4)
FK Turnov (4)	0–2	FK Baník Most - Souš (3)
SK Senco Doubravka (4)	2–5	FK Motorlet Prague (3)
FC Rokycany (4)	0–2	FK Loko Prague (3)
FK Jiskra Heřmanův Měštec (5)	0–3	SK Zápy (3)
FK Slavoj Český Krumlov (4)	3–4	FK Králův Dvůr (3)
SK Strakonice 1908 (4)	0–2	FK Příbram (2)
FK Klášterec nad Ohří (5)	1–10	FK Neratovice-Byškovice (3)
FK Horní Ředice (3)	3–0	MFK Chrudim (3)
SK Spartak Příbram (4)	2–3	FC Písek (3)
FK Chlumec nad Cidlinou (4)	0–4	FK Admira Prague (3)
FK Brandýs nad Labem (4)	1–1 (3–4 p)	FK Varnsdorf (3)
FK Baník Sokolov (4)	3–1	FK Arsenal Česká Lípa (2)
FK Meteor Prague VIII (4)	4–1	SK Sokol Brozany (3)
Spartak Police nad Metuji (4)	2–4	FK Viktoria Žižkov (2)
FC Slavia Karlovy Vary (4)	0–3	FK VIAGEM Ústí nad Labem (2)
19 August 2026
FK Kozlovice (4)	4–3	FC TVD Slavičín (4)

== Second round ==
The draw was made on 14 August 2026. The 42 winners from the first round were joined by the 10 First League teams not playing in European competitions.

Team 1	Score	Team 2
25 August 2026
FK Varnsdorf (3)	0–0 (4–3 p)	FK VIAGEM Ústí nad Labem (2)
FK Horní Ředice (3)	0–5	FK Dukla Prague (2)
SK Zápy (3)	2–3	Bohemians 1905 (1)
FK Motorlet Prague (3)	0–3	FC Vysočina Jihlava (2)
SK Uničov (3)	0–2	FC Zlín (1)
TJ Hluboká nad Vltavou (4)	0–2	FK Viktoria Žižkov (2)
26 August 2026
FC Sparta Brno (4)	0–9	FC Baník Ostrava (1)
FK Baník Most - Souš (3)	1–1 (3–4 p)	FK Příbram (2)
FK Křimice (4)	1–2	FK Teplice (1)
FC Písek (3)	0–2	FK Pardubice (1)
FK Baník Sokolov (4)	0–3	FC Sellier & Bellot Vlašim (2)
FK Přepeře (4)	0–2	FC Slovan Liberec (1)
FK Admira Prague (3)	0–4	FC Silon Táborsko (2)
FK Meteor Prague VIII (4)	0–4	FK Mladá Boleslav (1)
TJ Jiskra Domažlice (3)	3–4	SK Kladno (2)
SK Benátky nad Jizerou (3)	1–1 (4–5 p)	FK Neratovice-Byškovice (3)
FK Králův Dvůr (3)	4–1	FK Loko Prague (3)
ČSK Uherský Brod (3)	0–2	SK Artis Brno (1)
FC PBS Velká Bíteš (4)	1–2	1. FC Slovácko (1)
TJ Tatran Všechovice (4)	0–3	1. SK Prostějov (2)
FC Fastav Vsetín (3)	2–1	SK Hanácká Slavia Kroměříž (2)
1. BFK Frýdlant nad Ostravicí (4)	0–10	FC Zbrojovka Brno (1)
FK Bzenec-Vracov (4)	1–4	FK Třinec (2)
MFK Vítkovice (3)	1–1 (5–4 p)	FK SK Polanka nad Odrou (3)
SK Sulko Zábřeh (4)	0–4	MFK Havířov (3)
FK Kozlovice (4)	1–1 (5–4 p)	MFK Karviná (2)

== Third round ==
The draw for the third round took place on 28 August 2026.

Team 1	Score	Team 2
9 September 2026
1. SK Prostějov (2)	2–2 (a.e.t.) (4–3 p)	SK Sigma Olomouc (1)
FK Viktoria Žižkov (2)	0–5	AC Sparta Prague (1)
15 September 2026
FK Třinec (2)	0–3	FK Mladá Boleslav (1)
FC Sellier & Bellot Vlašim (2)	0–2	FC Slovan Liberec (1)
16 September 2026
FK Varnsdorf (3)	1–5	SK Slavia Prague (1)
FK Neratovice-Byškovice (3)	0–4	1.FC Slovácko (1)
FK Králův Dvůr (3)	0–3	FC Zbrojovka Brno (1)
MFK Havířov (3)	0–4	FC Zlín (1)
FK Kozlovice (4)	0–6	FK Pardubice (1)
MFK Vítkovice (3)	0–3	SK Artis Brno (1)
FK Příbram (2)	1–2	FC Hradec Králové (1)
FC Silon Táborsko (2)	0–5	FK Teplice (1)
23 September 2026
SK Kladno (2)	1–2 (a.e.t.)	FC Baník Ostrava (1)
30 September 2026
FC Fastav Vsetín (3)	0–5	Bohemians 1905 (1)
2 October 2026
FK Dukla Prague (2)	0–1	FK Jablonec (1)
28 October 2026
FC Vysočina Jihlava (2)	1–6	FC Viktoria Plzeň (1)

== Fourth round ==
Team 1	Score	Team 2
27 October 2026
FC Slovan Liberec (1)	1–0	FK Teplice (1)
SK Slavia Prague (1)	4–0	FC Zbrojovka Brno (1)
28 October 2026
1. SK Prostějov (2)	1–3 (a.e.t.)	FC Hradec Králové (1)
FK Mladá Boleslav (1)	3–2	Bohemians 1905 (1)
1. FC Slovácko (1)	1–4	FK Pardubice (1)
AC Sparta Prague (1)	0–2	FC Baník Ostrava (1)
11 November 2026
SK Artis Brno (1)	2–1	FK Jablonec (1)
3 December 2026
FC Zlín (1)	–	FC Viktoria Plzeň (1)

== Quarter-finals ==
3 March 2027	–
:

3 March 2027	–
:

3 March 2027	–
:

3 March 2027	–
:

== Semi-finals ==
21 April 2027	–
:

21 April 2027	–
:

== Final ==
12 May 2027
:

–
