= 2025–26 Czech Cup =

MOL Cup

Tournament details
- Country: Czech Republic

Final positions
- Champions: MFK Karviná (1st title)
- Runners-up: FK Jablonec

The 2025–26 Czech Cup, known as the MOL Cup for sponsorship reasons, was the 33rd season of the annual knockout football tournament of the Czech Republic. The winners qualified for the 2026–27 UEFA Europa League.

== Extra preliminary round ==
Team 1	Score	Team 2
20 July 2025
TJ Spartak Hluk	1–3	FC TVD Slavičín
FK Kovofiniš Ledeč nad Sázavou	0–1	TJ Dálnice Speřice
Jakubčovice Fotbal	0–2	FK Nový Jičín

== Preliminary round ==
Team 1	Score	Team 2
25 July 2025
TJ Tatran Všechovice	1–3	TJ Unie Hlubina
TJ Tatran Bohunice	4–2	FC Velké Meziříčí
FC Slovan Havlíčkův Brod	3–0	FC Žďas Žďár nad Sázavou
26 July 2025
FC Vratimov	2–2 (3–0 p)	MFK Havířov
FC Český Těšin	0–7	FK Třinec
FC Sparta Brno	5–0	TJ Slovan Bzenec
FC TVD Slavičín	1–3	FC Strání
FK Nový Jičín	1–3	FC Fastav Vsetín
TJ Sokol Lanžhot	2–1	1. SC Znojmo
SFK ELKO Holešov	0–2	FK Hodonín
SK Stonava	1–6	MFK Vítkovice
TJ Valašské Meziříčí	1–3	SK Hranice
27 July 2025
TJ Dálnice Speřice	0–3	SFK Vrchovina Nové Město
SK Sulko Zábřeh	2–1	FK Šumperk
AFC Humpolec	0–1	SK Fotbalová škola Třebíč
FC Brumov	0–0 (4–2 p)	ČSK Uherský Brod
TJ Sokol Tasovice	0–0 (4–3 p)	MSK Břeclav (IV
FC Chotěboř	3–2	SK Tatran Ždírec nad Doubravou
FK Bospor Bohumín	1–1 (3–2 p)	FK SK Polanka
TJ Skaštice	0–8	TJ Start Brno
FK Petřvald na Moravě	0–4	FK Frýdek-Místek
SK Jiskra Rýmařov	3–5	FK Nové Sady
TJ Břidličná	2–6	SK Uničov
29 July 2025
FK Bílovec	1–3	FK Kozlovice
SK Olympia Ráječko	2–2 (2–4 p)	FC Kuřim
2 August 2025
FK Brandýs nad Labem	3–2	FK Neratovice-Byškovice
FK Baník Sokolov	1–1 (4–3 p)	FK Ostrov
FK Olympie Březová	3–5	FC Slavia Karlovy Vary
FK Slavoj Český Krumlov	1–1 (3–4 p)	TJ Hluboká nad Vltavou
TJ FC Pěnčín	1–0	FK Slovan Hrádek nad Nisou 1910
SK Kosmonosy	3–1	FK Dobrovice
FK Přepeře	1–1 (4–3 p)	FK Turnov
FK Komárov	4–3	TJ Ligmet Milín
FK Meteor Prague VIII	2–0	FC Přední Kopanina
FC Tempo Prague	1–5	FK Králův Dvůr
SK Hořovice	2–3	Povltavská Fotbalová Akademie
TJ Přeštice	1–1 (2–4 p)	FC Rokycany
Spartak Kbely	1–5	SK Slaný
FK Česká Třebová	2–3	FC Hlinsko
FK Litoměřicko	0–4	SK Štěti
TJ Spoje Prague	2–3	FK Chlumec nad Cidlinou
SK Rapid Psáry	3–2	FK Benešov
FK Náchod	2–4	MFK Trutnov
FK Tachov	1–6	FC Viktoria Mariánské Lázně
FK Křimice	1–2	SK Senco Doubravka
FC ZVVZ Milevsko	2–4	TJ Spartak Soběslav
FK SEKO Louny	1–4	FC Chomutov
3 August 2025
TJ Svitavy	0–7	SK Vysoké Mýto
FK Čáslav	3–3 (6–7 p)	FK Horní Ředice
26 August 2025
SK Libčany	0–0 (3–1 p)	Spartak Police nad Metuji
1. BFK Frýdlant nad Ostravicí	0–1	FC Hlučín

== First round ==
Team 1	Score	Team 2
6 August 2025
FK Kozlovice	0–6	FK Frýdek-Místek
12 August 2025
FC Slovan Havlíčkův Brod	0–1	FC Zbrojovka Brno
FK Chlumec nad Cidlinou	1–1 (5–6 p)	FK Sparta Kolín
Povltavská Fotbalová Akademie	0–8	FC Silon Táborsko
FK Přepeře	0–3	FK Arsenal Česká Lípa
TJ Hluboká nad Vltavou	1–1 (6–5 p)	FK Loko Prague
13 August 2025
FC Brumov	1–6	1. SK Prostějov
FC Slavia Karlovy Vary	1–1 (4–3 p)	FK Viktoria Žižkov
TJ Sokol Lanžhot	0–0 (8–7 p)	SFC Opava
TJ Tatran Bohunice	1–0	TJ Start Brno
SK Benátky nad Jizerou	0–2	SK Kladno
SK Libčany	0–6	TJ Velké Hamry
FK Nové Sady	1–1 (4–3 p)	FC Hlučín
FC Chomutov	0–3	FK Admira Prague
FK Horní Ředice	2–1	FC Sellier & Bellot Vlašim
SK Vysoké Mýto	2–1	MFK Chrudim
TJ Spartak Soběslav	0–4	FC Písek
SK Senco Doubravka	1–6	SK Aritma Prague
FC Viktoria Mariánské Lázně	2–3	FK Baník Most-Souš
MFK Trutnov	2–0	TJ Jiskra Ústí nad Orlicí
SK Rapid Psáry	2–3	SK Petřín Plzeň
SK Štěti	0–1	SK Motorlet Prague
FC Hlinsko	3–0	FK Zápy
SK Slaný	2–2 (4–5 p)	Sokol Hostouň
FC Rokycany	3–0	FK Příbram
FK Meteor Prague VIII	1–2	FK Králův Dvůr
FK Komárov	1–2	TJ Jiskra Domažlice
SK Kosmonosy	0–3	TJ Slovan Velvary
FK Baník Sokolov	0–2	FK VIAGEM Ústi nad Labem
TJ FC Pěnčín	1–2	FK Brandýs nad Labem
FC Kuřim	0–2	SK Artis Brno
SK Sulko Zábřeh	0–4	SK Uničov
FC Fastav Vsetín	0–4	FK Třinec
FC Vratimov	1–1 (3–2 p)	MFK Vítkovice
FK Varnsdorf	0–2	SK Sokol Brozany
SK Fotbalová škola Třebíč	2–2 (3–2 p)	SFK Vrchovina Nové Město
FC Strání	0–1	SK Hanácká Slavia Kroměříž
FC Chotěboř	0–5	FC Vysočina Jihlava
TJ Sokol Tasovice	2–2 (3–4 p)	SK Hranice
FC Sparta Brno	0–6	FK Hodonín
FK Bospor Bohumín	4–1	TJ Unie Hlubina

== Second round ==
Team 1	Score	Team 2
26 August 2025
FK Třinec	2–2 (4–3 p)	1. SK Prostějov
TJ Slovan Velvary	0–2	FK Teplice
FK Horní Ředice	1–0	SK Aritma Prague
SK Kladno	2–3	SK Dynamo České Budějovice
FK Admira Prague	0–3	FK Jablonec
FK Arsenal Česká Lípa	1–2	FK Pardubice
27 August 2025
TJ Sokol Lanžhot	3–1	SK Hanácká Slavia Kroměříž
SK Fotbalová škola Třebíč	1–2	FK Nové Sady
FC Vratimov	1–4	FK Frýdek-Místek
SK Uničov	2–2 (3–4 p)	SK Artis Brno
TJ Tatran Bohunice	0–4	FC Zbrojovka Brno
FK Hodonín	0–2	1. FC Slovácko
FK Bospor Bohumín	1–6	MFK Karviná
SK Petřín Plzeň	1–0	SK Motorlet Prague
SK Sokol Brozany	2–2 (8–7 p)	FK Sparta Kolín
FC Hlinsko	2–1	MFK Trutnov
TJ Velké Hamry	0–2	FK Dukla Prague
FK Králův Dvůr	4–5	FK VIAGEM Ústi nad Labem
TJ Hluboká nad Vltavou	0–4	FC Silon Táborsko
FC Rokycany	0–1	FK Mladá Boleslav
SK Vysoké Mýto	0–1	FC Vysočina Jihlava
Sokol Hostouň	1–2	Bohemians 1905
FK Brandýs nad Labem	0–6	FC Slovan Liberec
SK Hranice	0–5	FC Zlín
FC Slavia Karlovy Vary	3–0	FK Baník Most-Souš
28 August 2025
TJ Jiskra Domažlice	1–0	FC Písek

== Third round ==
The draw took place on 28 August 2025.

Team 1	Score	Team 2
16 September 2025
TJ Sokol Lanžhot	1–6	FC Viktoria Plzeň
23 September 2025
SK Sokol Brozany	0–2	SK Slavia Prague
FK Horní Ředice	1–2	1. FC Slovácko
FC Silon Táborsko	1–6	MFK Karviná
24 September 2025
TJ Jiskra Domažlice	1–4	Bohemians 1905
SK Dynamo České Budějovice	2–3	Baník Ostrava
FK Nové Sady	3–2	SK Sigma Olomouc
FC Slavia Karlovy Vary	0–5	AC Sparta Prague
FK Frýdek-Místek	1–2 (a.e.t.)	FK Pardubice
FC Hlinsko	0–2	FK Jablonec
SK Petřín Plzeň	1–4	FK Mladá Boleslav
FK VIAGEM Ústi nad Labem	0–2	FC Zlín
FC Zbrojovka Brno	2–1	FK Teplice
30 September 2025
SK Artis Brno	1–1 (6–5 p)	FC Slovan Liberec
FC Vysočina Jihlava	0–1	FK Dukla Prague
1 October 2025
FK Třinec	3–4 (a.e.t.)	FC Hradec Králové

== Fourth round ==
Team 1	Score	Team 2
28 October 2025
MFK Karviná	1–0	1. FC Slovácko
FK Jablonec	2–1	FK Dukla Prague
29 October 2025
FK Nové Sady	0–2	FC Viktoria Plzeň
FC Zlín	0–4	SK Slavia Prague
5 November 2025
FK Pardubice	3–4 (a.e.t.)	Baník Ostrava
Bohemians 1905	0–0 (4–5 p)	FK Mladá Boleslav
12 November 2025
FC Zbrojovka Brno	0–3	FC Hradec Králové
3 December 2025
SK Artis Brno	1–2	AC Sparta Prague

== Quarter-finals ==
3 March 2026	FK Jablonec	2–2 (a.e.t.) (3–2 p)	SK Slavia Prague	Jablonec nad Nisou
17:00	Chramosta 53'; Singhateh 80'		Suleiman 6'; Mbodji 90+4'	Stadium: Stadion Střelnice; Attendance: 3,351; Referee: Jan Všetečka
	Penalties
	Novák (penalty missed); Štěpánek (penalty scored); Jawo (penalty scored); Singhateh (penalty scored)		(penalty scored) Chorý; (penalty missed) Chaloupek; (penalty scored) Jurásek; (penalty missed) Holeš; (penalty missed) Kušej

3 March 2026	FK Mladá Boleslav	0–0 (a.e.t.) (4–2 p)	AC Sparta Prague	Mladá Boleslav
20:00				Stadium: Lokotrans Aréna; Attendance: 3,580; Referee: Dominik Starý
	Penalties
	Karafiát (penalty scored); Zíka (penalty scored); Kolářík (penalty scored); Lehký (penalty scored)		(penalty missed) Haraslín; (penalty missed) Kairinen; (penalty scored) Ryneš; (penalty scored) Vydra

4 March 2026	FC Hradec Králové	0–0 (a.e.t.) (5–6 p)	FC Baník Ostrava	Hradec Králové
17:00				Stadium: Malšovická aréna Attendance: 6,107; Referee: Dalibor Černý
	Penalties
	Darida (penalty missed); Regža (penalty scored); Dancák (penalty scored); Trubač (penalty missed); Horák (penalty scored); Čihák (penalty scored); Vlkanova (penalty scored); Uhrinčať (penalty missed)		(penalty scored) Planka; (penalty scored) Holzer; (penalty scored) Kričfaluši; (penalty missed) Kohút; (penalty missed) Jurečka; (penalty scored) Boula; (penalty scored) Frydrych; (penalty scored) Chaluš

5 March 2026	MFK Karviná	3–0	FC Viktoria Plzeň	Karviná
20:00	Ayaosi 24'; Labík 39'; Kačor 76'			Stadium: Městský stadion Attendance: 2,023; Referee: Pavel Orel

== Semi-finals ==
21 April 2026	FK Jablonec	1–0	FK Mladá Boleslav	Jablonec nad Nisou
17:00	Jawo 34'			Stadium: Stadion Střelnice; Attendance: 3,827; Referee: Ondrej Berka

21 April 2026	MFK Karviná	2–1	FC Baník Ostrava	Karviná
20:00	Kačor 67'; Vinícius 82'		Kričfaluši 90'	Stadium: Městský stadion Attendance: 4,750; Referee: Karel Roucek

== Final ==
20 May 2026
17:00

FK Jablonec	1–3	MFK Karviná
Jawo 16' (pen.)		Condé 44'; Vinícius 48', 90+1'

Malšovická aréna, Hradec Králové
Attendance: 7,352
Referee: Marek Radina
