= 2000–01 Czech Cup =

Pohár ČMFS

Tournament details
- Country: Czech Republic
- Teams: 125

Final positions
- Champions: Viktoria Žižkov
- Runners-up: Sparta Prague

The 2000–01 Czech Cup was the eighth edition of the annual football knockout tournament organized by the Czech Football Association of the Czech Republic.

Viktoria Žižkov prevailed at the 28 May 2001 Cup and qualified for the 2001–02 UEFA Cup.

== Teams ==
Round	Clubs remaining	Clubs involved	Winners from previous round	New entries this round	Leagues entering at this round
Preliminary round	125	26	none	26	Levels 4 and 5 in football league pyramid
First round	112	96	13	83	Czech 2. Liga; Bohemian Football League; Moravian-Silesian Football League; Czech Fourth Division
Second round	64	64	48	16	Czech First League
Third round	32	32	32	none	none
Fourth round	16	16	16	none	none
Quarter finals	8	8	8	none	none
Semi finals	4	4	4	none	none
Final	2	2	2	none	none

== Preliminary round ==
26 teams took part in the preliminary round.

Team 1	Score	Team 2
Dukla Dejvice	2–3	Uhelné sklady
FK Brandýs	3–0	Bělá pod Bezdězem
Rako Rakovník	3–1	Žatec
Velim	1–0	Olympia Hradec Králové
Hrdějovice	1–3	Sezimovo Ústí
Sušice	0–1	Přeštice
Siad Braňany	1–0	Litvínov
Velké Hamry	0–1	Trutnov
Loko Pardubice	2–1	Choceň
Deštné	1–0	Rychnov nad Kněžnou
Holešov	0–0; 5-4 pen	Napajedla
Hodolany	0–3 w/o	Rýmařov
Inter Petrovice	1–2	FK Slavia Orlová

== Round 1 ==
83 teams entered the competition at this stage. Along with the 13 winners from the preliminary round, these teams played 48 matches to qualify for the second round.

Team 1	Score	Team 2
SK Smíchov	0–2	Sparta Krč
SK Motorlet Prague	2–2; 1-3 pen	Admira/Slavoj
Uhelné sklady	4–3	Střížkov
FK Brandýs	0–2	SC Xaverov H.Počernice
Kralupy	0–3	Spolana Neratovice
Čelákovice	0–0; 6-5 pen	Mladá Boleslav
Litoměřice	0–7	SK Kladno
Sibřina	1–1; 3-1 pen	Semice
Rako Rakovník	3–5	TJ Rakovník
Velim	1–2	Kolín
Sezimovo Ústí	3–2	FK Tábor
Tachov	1–5	Prachatice
Chlumčany	0–0; 5-4 pen	Třeboň
Přeštice	3–0	Klatovy
Roudnice	1–3	Chomutov
Štětí	0–5	Most
Kadaň	3–0	Karlovy Vary – Dvory
Siad Braňany	1–0	Neštěmice
Trutnov	1–1; 2-4 pen	Varnsdorf
Loko Pardubice	2–4	FK AS Pardubice
Česká Třebová	4–1	Chrudim
Letohrad	0–2	Hradec Králové
Deštné	2–1	Semily
Slavkov u Brna	1–2	Zeman Brno
Svitavy	2–2; 5-4 pen	Dolní Kounice
Znojmo	1–2	Kyjov
Slavia Třebíč	1–2	Bopo Třebíč
ČAFC Židenice	0–1	FC Vysočina Jihlava
Břeclav	1–1; 2-3 pen	SK Tatran Poštorná
Rajhrad	1–2	Dosta Bystrc
Slušovice	1–2	FK Baník Ratíškovice
Slavičín	1–1; 3-2 pen	Brumov
Chropyně	0–5	Prostějov
Holešov	1–6	Kunovice
Bystřice p.Host.	0–2	FK Zlín
Hulín	2–3	Kroměříž
Rýmařov	1–1; 6-5 pen	Holice
Bruntál	0–8	Opava
Velké Losiny	3–1	Uničov
Šumperk	0–6	Město Albrechtice
Dukla Hranice	0–0; 6-5 pen	SK Hranice
Valašské Meziříčí	0–2	VP Frýdek/Místek
Kravaře	0–2	Dolní Benešov
Vratimov	1–1; 4-1 pen	FC Vítkovice
FC Bílovec	0–2	Nový Jičín
FK Slavia Orlová	0–1	Fotbal Třinec
Refotal Albrechtice	0–0; 4-3 pen	FC Karviná
Lokomotiva Petrovice	3–0	Dětmarovice

== Round 2 ==
Team 1	Score	Team 2
Kolín	0–5	Sparta Prague
Kadaň	0–1	Most
Přeštice	1–3	FC Viktoria Plzeň
Uhelné sklady	0–4	Chomutov
Varnsdorf	2–6	Teplice
TJ Rakovník	1–0	Spolana Neratovice
Prostějov	2–0	Sigma Olomouc
Velké Losiny	0–5	Opava
Deštné	1–2	Liberec
Dosta Bystrc	1–1; 3-2 pen	Svitavy
Prachatice	2–2; 2-4 pen	Viktoria Žižkov
Kroměříž	2–1	Rýmařov
Čelákovice	1–3	Jablonec
Kunovice	1–1; 4-1 pen	FK Zlín
Sparta Brno	1–8	Stavo Brno
Bopo Třebíč	0–1	FC Vysočina Jihlava
SK Tatran Poštorná	1–8	Drnovice
Kyjov	0–1	FK Baník Ratíškovice
Sezimovo Ústí	0–4	České Budějovice
Město Albrechtice	1–1; 9-10 pen	Fotbal Třinec
Siad Braňany	0–2	Bohemians Prague
Sibřina	1–1; 4-5 pen	FK AS Pardubice
Kladno	0–2	Chmel Blšany
Sparta Krč	0–0; 3-0 pen	Hradec Králové
Chlumčany	0–6	Marila Příbram
Admira/Slavoj	0–1	SC Xaverov H.Počernice
Dolní Benešov	0–1	Baník Ostrava
Dukla Hranice	0–3 w/o	Nový Jičín
Slavičín	0–5	FC Synot
VP Frýdek/Místek	0–3	Vratimov
Česká Třebová	2–6	Slavia Prague
Lok. Petrovice	1–1; 3-4 pen	Refotal Albrechtice

== Round 3 ==
Team 1	Score	Team 2
Most	1–3	Sparta Prague
Chomutov	3–1	FC Viktoria Plzeň
TJ Rakovník	1–3	Teplice
Opava	1–1; 4-3 pen	Prostějov
Dosta Bystrc	0–2	Liberec
Kroměříž	1–7	Viktoria Žižkov
Kunovice	1–2	Jablonec
FC Vysočina Jihlava	2–2; 2-3 pen	Stavo Brno
FK Baník Ratíškovice	1–2	Drnovice
Fotbal Třinec	1–2	České Budějovice
FK AS Pardubice	0–0; 4-5 pen	Bohemians Prague
Sparta Krč	0–0; 4-5 pen	Chmel Blšany
SC Xaverov H.Počernice	0–1	Marila Příbram
Nový Jičín	1–2	Baník Ostrava
Vratimov	2–3	FC Synot
Refotal Albrechtice	0–4	Slavia Prague

== Round 4 ==
The fourth round was played between 20 and 25 March 2001.

Team 1	Score	Team 2
Chomutov	0–3	Sparta Prague
Opava	0–0; 2-3 pen	Teplice
Viktoria Žižkov	3–1	Liberec
Stavo Brno	0–2	Jablonec
České Budějovice	2–2; 4-2 pen	Drnovice
Chmel Blšany	2–1	Bohemians Prague
Baník Ostrava	3–0	Marila Příbram
Slavia Prague	5–3	FC Synot

== Quarterfinals ==
The quarterfinals were played between 10 and 12 April 2001.

Team 1	Score	Team 2
Sparta Prague	3–1	Baník Ostrava
Viktoria Žižkov	3–2 (a.e.t.)	Teplice
Chmel Blšany	3–2	České Budějovice
Jablonec	1–1; 1-3 pen	Slavia Prague

== Semifinals ==
The semifinals were played on 1 and 2 May 2001.

Team 1	Score	Team 2
Slavia Prague	1–3	Viktoria Žižkov
Sparta Prague	2–0	Chmel Blšany

== Final ==
The final was played with the golden goal rule; in the event of a tie after 90 minutes, 30 minutes additional time would be added, with any goal signalling the immediate end of the game.

28 May 2001
19:00 CEST

Sparta Prague	1–2 (a.e.t./g.g.)	Viktoria Žižkov
Jarošík 32'		14' Stracený; 98' Pikl

Stadion Evžena Rošického, Prague
Attendance: 4,050
Referee: Miroslav Liba

== See also ==
- 2000–01 Czech First League
- 2000–01 Czech 2. Liga
