= Denny Samko =

Czech footballer (born 2000)

Personal information
- Date of birth: 20 July 2000 (age 26)
- Height: 1.72 m (5 ft 8 in)
- Position: Attacking midfielder

Team information
- Current team: MFK Karviná
- Number: 10

Youth career
- 2007–2009: FK Náchod
- 2009–2020: Hradec Králové

Senior career*
Years	Team	Apps	(Gls)
2020–2024	Hradec Králové	15	(2)
2021–2022	→ Chlumec nad Cidlinou (loan)	29	(9)
2022–2024	→ Varnsdorf (loan)	55	(10)
2024–	MFK Karviná	60	(7)

International career
2015–2016	Czech Republic U16	6	(0)
2017	Czech Republic U17	1	(2)
- * Club domestic league appearances and goals as of 27 May 2026

Denny Samko (born 20 July 2000) is a Czech professional footballer who plays as an attacking midfielder for Czech club MFK Karviná. He is also a former Czech Republic youth international.

== Club career ==
=== Hradec Králové ===
Samko was raised in FK Náchod, but at the age of nine, he transferred to FC Hradec Králové. In the 2017–18 season, he worked his way up to the senior category, where he initially played for the junior team in the local league, and later also played for the youth team or reserve.

He made his league debut for the "A" team of Hradec Králové on 11 June 2020, in a match against FK Viktoria Žižkov, coming on as a substitute in the 80th minute for of Adam Vlkanova. Samko scored his first league goal for the senior team on 18 June 2020 against Zbrojovka Brno. He scored for the second time for Hradec Králové in the 2020–21 season in a match against Ústí nad Labem (5–1 win) in the eighth round, when he increased the lead to 4–0 in the 76th minute.

=== MFK Karviná ===
Samko's performances in Varnsdorf impressed Karviná, which resulted in a transfer to the club in July 2024. He scored his first goal for the club in August against FK Teplice, when he made it 3–0 for the guests in the 74th minute of the 6th round of the Czech First League.

He waited almost a year until his next goal contribution, scoring and assisting a goal in a 3–2 loss against Sparta Prague.

In the 2025–26 season, Samko was praised for his form, contributing seven goals and assists in 12 matches.

== Career statistics ==
As of 18 July 2025

Appearances and goals by club, season and competition
Club	Season	League			Czech Cup		Other		Total	
Club	Season	Division	Apps	Goals	Apps	Goals	Apps	Goals	Apps	Goals
Hradec Králové	2019–20	Czech National Football League	9	1	1	0	—		10	1
Hradec Králové	2020–21	Czech National Football League	6	1	2	1	—		8	2
Hradec Králové	Total		15	2	3	1	—		18	3
Chlumec nad Cidlinou	2021–22	Bohemian Football League	29	9	2	1	—		31	10
Varnsdorf	2022–23	Czech National Football League	28	2	1	0	—		29	2
Varnsdorf	2023–24	Czech National Football League	27	8	1	0	—		28	8
Varnsdorf	Total		55	10	2	0	—		57	10
Karviná	2024–25	Czech First League	26	2	1	0	2 (Note: Appearances in Czech First League middle group play-offs)	0	29	2
Karviná	2025–26	Czech First League	29	4	6	2	3	1	38	7
Karviná	Total		55	6	7	2	5	1	67	9
Career total			154	27	14	4	5	1	173	32

== Honours ==
Karviná

- Czech Cup: 2025–26
