= 2024–25 FK Pardubice season =

Pardubice
2024–25 season
- Manager: Jiří Saňák
- Stadium: CFIG Arena
- Czech First League: Pre-season
- Czech Cup: Pre-season
- Average home league attendance: 2,547

The 2024–25 season is the 17th season in the history of FK Pardubice, and the club's fifth consecutive season in Czech First League. In addition to the domestic league, the team is scheduled to participate in the Czech Cup.

== Transfers ==
=== In ===
Pos.	Player	Transferred to	Fee	Date	Source
MF	(Czech Republic) Tomáš Polyák	(Czech Republic) Slovan Liberec	Loan	18 July 2024	

== Friendlies ==
=== Pre-season ===
29 June 2024 Friendly	Slavia Prague (Czech Republic)	1–1	(Czech Republic) Pardubice	Roudnice nad Labem
14:00	Jurečka 90+3'		Míšek 57'	Stadium: Stadion Pod Lípou

6 July 2024 Friendly	Greuther Fürth (Germany)	2–1	(Czech Republic) Pardubice
16:00	Futkeu 42'; Gießelmann 57'		Jindra 44'

12 July 2024 Friendly	Pardubice (Czech Republic)	0–0	(Czech Republic) MFK Chrudim
18:00

== Competitions ==
=== Overall record ===
Competition	First match	Last match	Starting round	Final position	Record							
Competition	First match	Last match	Starting round	Final position	Pld	W	D	L	GF	GA	GD	Win %
Czech First League regular season	20 July 2024	19 April 2025	Matchday 1	14th	0	0	0	0	0	0	+0	—
Czech First League relegation round	26 April 2024	25 May 2025	Matchday 1		0	0	0	0	0	0	+0	—
Czech Cup					0	0	0	0	0	0	+0	—
Total					0	0	0	0	0	0	+0	—

Last updated: 19 July 2024
Source: Soccerway

=== Czech First League ===
==== Regular season ====
Pos	Team	Pld	W	D	L	GF	GA	GD	Pts	Qualification or relegation
12	Teplice	30	9	7	14	32	42	−10	34 (Note: Head to head points: Bohemians 1905 8, Mladá Boleslav 7, Teplice 1.)	Qualification for the relegation group
13	Slovácko	30	7	9	14	25	51	−26	30	Qualification for the relegation group
14	Dukla Prague	30	5	9	16	23	47	−24	24	Qualification for the relegation group
15	Pardubice	30	4	7	19	22	49	−27	19	Qualification for the relegation group
16	České Budějovice	30	0	5	25	14	78	−64	5	Qualification for the relegation group

Source: Chance Liga
Rules for classification: 1) Points; 2) Head-to-head points; 3) Head-to-head goal difference; 4) Head-to-head goals scored; 5) Goal difference; 6) Goals scored; 7) Fair-play ranking; 8) Draw.

==== Results summary ====
Overall								Home						Away					
Pld	W	D	L	GF	GA	GD	Pts	W	D	L	GF	GA	GD	W	D	L	GF	GA	GD
1	0	0	1	1	2	−1	0	0	0	0	0	0	0	0	0	1	1	2	−1

Last updated: 19 July 2024.
Source: Chance Liga

==== Results by round ====
Round	1
Ground	A
Result	L
Position	

Updated to match(es) played on 19 July 2024. Source: Chance Liga
A = Away; H = Home; W = Win; D = Draw; L = Loss

==== Matches ====
The match schedule was released on 20 June 2024.

19 July 2024 1	Sparta Prague	2–1	Pardubice	Prague
19:00 CEST (UTC+2)	Ryneš 45+3'; Olatunji 59'	Report	Kalabiška 25'	Stadium: Stadion Letná; Attendance: 16,744; Referee: Jan Všetečka

==== Relegation round ====
Pos	Team	Pld	W	D	L	GF	GA	GD	Pts	Qualification or relegation
11	Teplice	35	12	8	15	41	45	−4	44	
12	Mladá Boleslav	35	11	8	16	48	48	0	41	
13	Slovácko	35	9	11	15	31	56	−25	38	
14	Dukla Prague (O)	35	8	10	17	34	55	−21	34	Qualification for the relegation play-offs
15	Pardubice (O)	35	6	7	22	25	56	−31	25	Qualification for the relegation play-offs
16	České Budějovice (R)	35	0	6	29	16	86	−70	6	Relegation to FNL

Source: Chance Liga
Rules for classification: 1) Total points; 2) Points earned in regular season; 3) Head-to-head points (regular season); 4) Head-to-head goal difference (regular season); 5) Head-to-head goals scored (regular season); 5) Goal difference (all matches); 6) Goals scored (all matches); 7) Fair-play ranking; 8) Draw.
(O) Play-off winners; (R) Relegated
