= Jiří Štajner =

Czech footballer (born 1976)

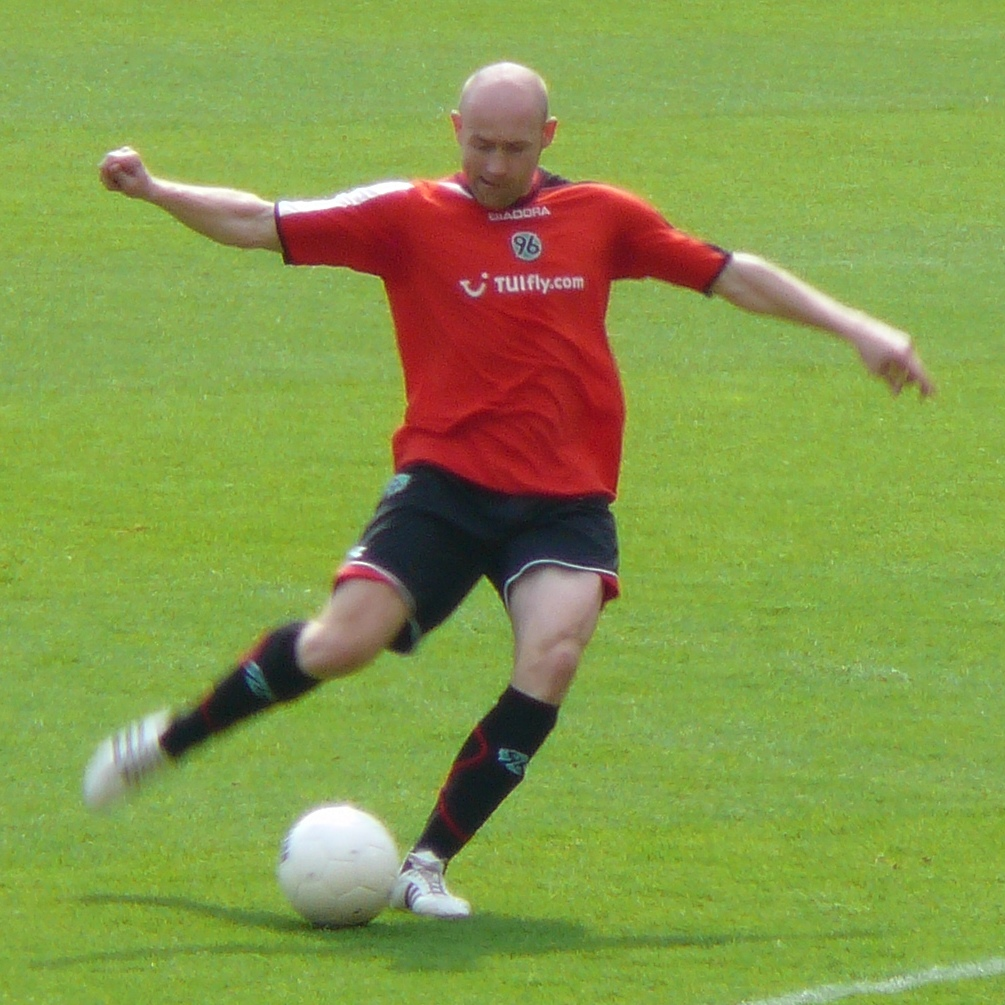
- Štajner playing for Hannover 96 in 2008

Personal information
- Full name: Jiří Štajner
- Date of birth: 27 May 1976 (age 50)
- Place of birth: Benešov, Czechoslovakia
- Height: 1.85 m (6 ft 1 in)
- Positions: Attacking midfielder; second striker

Team information
- Current team: Turnov (manager)

Youth career
- 1982–1990: TJ Senohraby
- 1990–1994: Slavia Prague

Senior career*
Years	Team	Apps	(Gls)
1994–1996	Slavia Prague	6	(0)
1995	→ Švarc Benešov (loan)	1	(1)
1996	České Budějovice	0	(0)
1996–1997	Slavia Louňovice	23	(22)
1998–1999	MUS Most	59	(26)
2000–2002	Slovan Liberec	63	(25)
2002–2010	Hannover 96	218	(42)
2004	→ Sparta Prague (loan)	14	(3)
2010–2013	Slovan Liberec	80	(32)
2013–2014	Mladá Boleslav	23	(4)
2015	Neugersdorf	13	(6)
Total		500	(161)

International career
2002–2012	Czech Republic	37	(4)

Managerial career
- 2020–2024: Arsenal Česká Lípa (assistant)
- 2024–: Turnov
- * Club domestic league appearances and goals

Jiří Štajner (born 27 May 1976) is a Czech former professional footballer who played as an attacking midfielder or second striker. Eight years a player for Hannover 96, he is extremely popular with Hannover fans and is seen as a cult figure at the club.

== Club career ==
=== Czech Republic ===
Štajner started his active footballing career in the youth teams of SK Dynamo České Budějovice. At a young age, he was picked up by one of the league's best teams, Slavia Prague. He failed to make a breakthrough at Slavia, continuing his youth career with TJ Senohraby, an amateur club close to the city where he grew up - Benešov.

In 1998, Štajner moved on to MUS Most in an attempt to advance his career, although his breakthrough was to come at the beginning of the new millennium after signing for Slovan Liberec, as he became known as an excellent goalscorer and attracted attention with his European performances in the UEFA Cup. In the 2001–02 season he was the Czech First League's top goalscorer with 15 goals as Slovan secured the title. In the summer of 2002, Štajner was signed by German Bundesliga side Hannover 96.

=== Hannover 96 ===
Štajner quickly became a favourite with coach Ralf Rangnick, although the club from the Lower Saxonian capital had to pay his former club €3.5 million, which made Štajner the most expensive player in the history of Hannover 96.

At the beginning of his spell in Germany he had trouble adapting to the style of play, only becoming a regular starter in his second season. On 22 May 2003, Štajner helped cement his status as a cult hero for the club, notably scoring the decisive goal against Borussia Mönchengladbach to retain Hannover's place in the top flight. The match ended 2–2.

On 15 May 2010, he announced his return to his former club Slovan Liberec.

In 2015, he joined Czech lower league side TJ Spartak Chrastava.

== International career ==
Štajner was a member of the Czech Republic national team, and played in the 2006 FIFA World Cup.

== Coaching career ==
On 14 January 2020, Štajner was appointed as a playing assistant of Arsenal Česká Lípa.

On 12 September 2024, Štajner was appointed manager of Turnov.

== Honours ==
Slovan Liberec

- Czech Cup: 1999–2000
- Czech First League: 2001–02
