= Václav Jurečka =

Czech footballer (born 1994)

Personal information
- Full name: Václav Jurečka
- Date of birth: 26 June 1994 (age 32)
- Place of birth: Opava, Czech Republic
- Height: 1.82 m (6 ft 0 in)
- Position: Forward

Team information
- Current team: Baník Ostrava
- Number: 15

Youth career
- Opava

Senior career*
| Years | Team | Apps | (Gls) |
| 2012–2019 | Opava | 142 | (28) |
| 2014 | → Kolín (loan) | 12 | (0) |
| 2020–2022 | Slovácko | 71 | (25) |
| 2022–2024 | Slavia Prague | 62 | (41) |
| 2024–2025 | Çaykur Rizespor | 40 | (2) |
| 2026– | Baník Ostrava | 16 | (4) |

International career^{‡}
| 2013 | Czech Republic U19 | 3 | (1) |
| 2022– | Czech Republic | 9 | (1) |
- * Club domestic league appearances and goals as of 25 May 2026 ‡ National team caps and goals as of 7 September 2023

Václav Jurečka (born 26 June 1994) is a Czech professional footballer who plays as a forward for Czech First League club Baník Ostrava and the Czech Republic national football team.

== Club career ==
At the 2016–17 Czech Cup, Jurečka scored five goals, becoming the top scorer of Opava. On 26 April 2017, he scored the second goal in Opava's 2–0 victory at Mladá Boleslav in the semi-finals, helping his Second League team to defeat their fourth First League opponents in a row and advance to the cup final for the first time in club history.

On 6 January 2020, Jurečka signed with Slovácko. He made his league debut on 22 February in a goalless draw against FK Mladá Boleslav. Jurečka scored his first league goal 27 June in a 1–2 loss against Bohemians 1905. On 30 April 2022, he scored his first league hat-trick in a 3–1 victory against Baník Ostrava.

On 4 June 2022, Jurečka signed with Slavia Prague. He scored four goals in a 6–0 victory against Bohemians 1905. In the 2023–24 Czech First League, Jurečka became the season's top scorer of Czech First League against Mlada Boleslav.

On 13 September 2024, Jurečka signed a two-year contract with Turkish club Çaykur Rizespor with option for another year.

On 2 January 2026, Jurečka signed a contract with Baník Ostrava.

== International career ==
After Patrik Schick suffered an injury in early 2022, Jurečka received his first senior call-up for the 2022 FIFA World Cup play-off against Sweden and a friendly match against Wales. He made his international debut in the latter tournament on 29 March, coming off as a substitute in the second half which ended in a 1–1 draw. On 10 September 2023, Jurečka scored his first goal in a 1–1 friendly draw against Hungary.

== Career statistics ==
As of 5th of January 2026

Appearances and goals by club, season and competition
| Club | Season | League | | | Czech Cup | | Europe | | Total | |
| Club | Season | Division | Apps | Goals | Apps | Goals | Apps | Goals | Apps | Goals |
|---|---|---|---|---|---|---|---|---|---|---|
| Opava | 2012–13 | Czech National Football League | 12 | 3 | — | | — | | 12 | 3 |
| Opava | 2013–14 | Czech National Football League | 0 | 0 | 2 | 0 | — | | 2 | 0 |
| Opava | 2014–15 | Czech National Football League | 12 | 3 | — | | — | | 13 | 3 |
| Kolín | 2014–15 | Czech National Football League | 12 | 0 | — | | — | | 13 | 1 |
| Opava | 2015–16 | Czech National Football League | 28 | 4 | 3 | 3 | — | | 31 | 7 |
| Opava | 2016–17 | Czech National Football League | 26 | 9 | 6 | 5 | — | | 32 | 14 |
| Opava | 2017–18 | Czech National Football League | 29 | 6 | 2 | 0 | — | | 31 | 6 |
| Opava | 2018–19 | Czech First League | 27 | 2 | 3 | 1 | — | | 30 | 3 |
| Opava | 2019–20 | Czech First League | 7 | 1 | 1 | 1 | — | | 8 | 2 |
| | Total | | 142 | 28 | 16 | 10 | — | | 157 | 38 |
| Slovácko | 2019–20 | Czech First League | 9 | 1 | 1 | 0 | — | | 10 | 1 |
| Slovácko | 2020–21 | Czech First League | 27 | 7 | 1 | 1 | — | | 28 | 8 |
| Slovácko | 2021–22 | Czech First League | 35 | 17 | 4 | 3 | 2 (Note: Appearances in UEFA Europa Conference League) | 0 | 41 | 20 |
| Slovácko | Total | | 71 | 25 | 6 | 4 | 2 | 0 | 79 | 29 |
| Slavia Prague | 2022–23 | Czech First League | 27 | 20 | 4 | 3 | 3 | 2 | 34 | 25 |
| Slavia Prague | 2023–24 | Czech First League | 32 | 19 | 1 | 0 | 11 (Note: Appearances in UEFA Europa League) | 3 | 44 | 22 |
| Slavia Prague | 2024-25 | Czech First League | 2 | 1 | 0 | 0 | 1 | 1 | 3 | 2 |
| Slavia Prague | Total | | 45 | 28 | 5 | 3 | 12 | 5 | 62 | 36 |
| Çaykur Rizespor | 2024-25 | Süper Lig | 28 | 1 | 4 | 3 | 0 | 0 | 32 | 4 |
| Çaykur Rizespor | 2025-26 | Süper Lig | 12 | 1 | 1 | 1 | 0 | 0 | 13 | 2 |
| Çaykur Rizespor | Total | | 40 | 2 | 5 | 4 | 0 | 0 | 45 | 6 |
| FC Baník Ostrava | 2025-26 | Czech First League | 0 | 0 | 0 | 0 | 0 | 0 | 0 | 0 |
| FC Baník Ostrava | Total | | 0 | 0 | 0 | 0 | 0 | 0 | 0 | 0 |
| Career total | | | 325 | 95 | 35 | 21 | 17 | 6 | 377 | 123 |

== Honours ==
Slavia Prague

- Czech Cup: 2022–23

Individual

- Czech First League Top goalscorer: 2022–23, 2023–24
