= FC Zlínsko =

- Full name: FC Zlínsko, spolek
- Founded: 1928; 98 years ago
- Ground: Fotbalový stadion ve Zlínské ulici
- Capacity: 1,000 (600 seated)
- Chairman: Tomáš Macek
- League: 8. league Zlín Region
- 2025–26: 10th
- Website: https://fczlinsko.cz/

FC Zlínsko is a Czech football club located in Otrokovice in the Zlín Region. From 2015 to 2025 the club played in the Moravian–Silesian Football League, which is the third tier of Czech football.

On 10 September 2026, Zlínsko was administratively relegated to the lowest 10th league by the Ethics Committee of the FAČR due to alleged match-fixing.

== Historical names ==
Club logo 2022–2023

Club logo until 2022

- 1928 — SK Viktoria Kvítkovice
- 1949 — Československé stavební závody Gottwaldov, Pozemní závody Gottwaldov, TATRAN GOTTWALDOV
- 1958 — TJ Sokol Kvítkovice
- 1961 — Moravan Kvítkovice, Moravan Otrokovice
- 1993 — FC Viktoria Otrokovice
- 2022 — SK Kvítkovice
- 2023 — FC Zlínsko

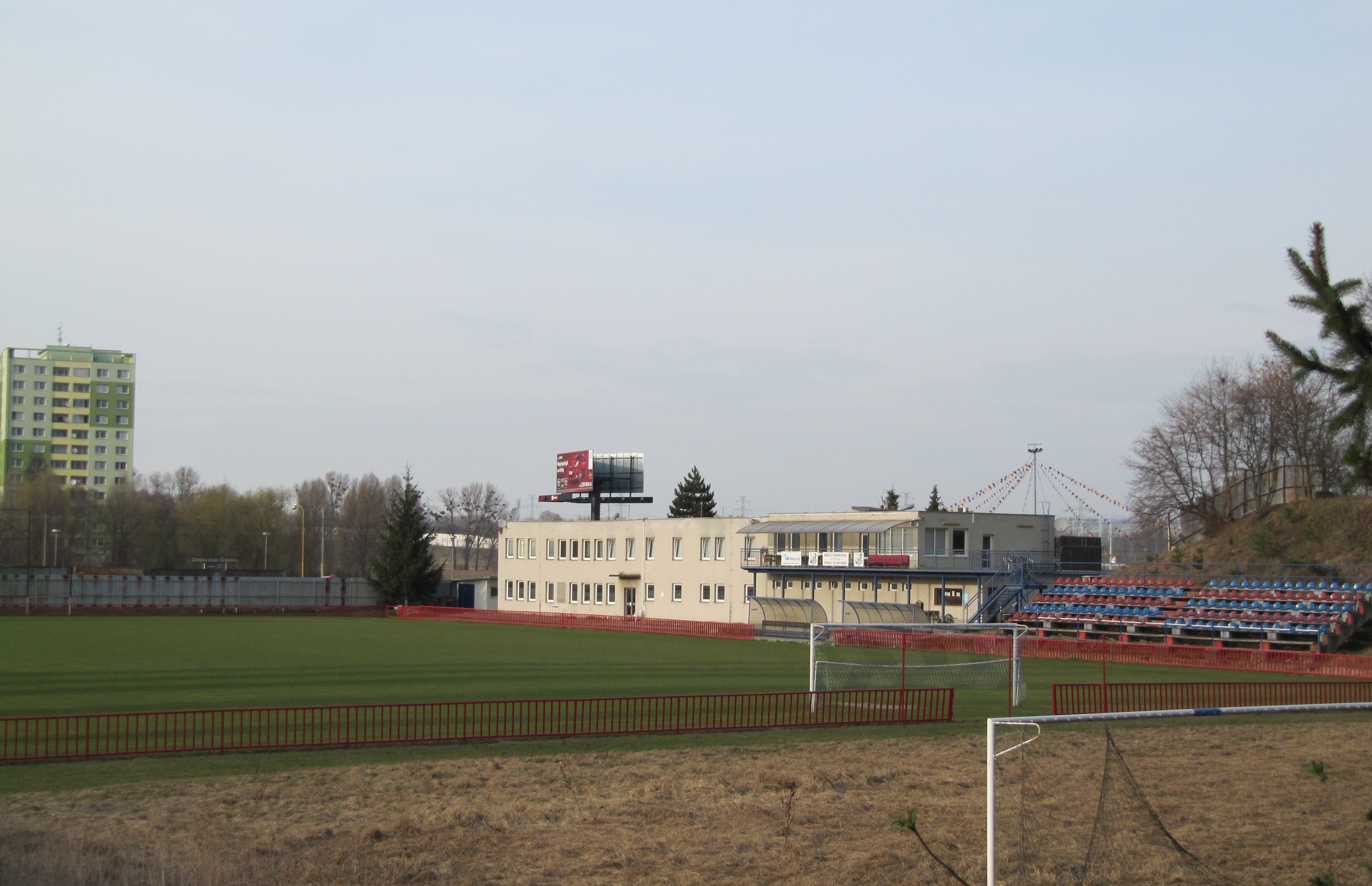
Stadium of SK Kvítkovice.
