= FK Dobrovice =

- Full name: Fotbalový klub Dobrovice
- Founded: 1911; 115 years ago
- Ground: Stadion FK Dobrovice
- Capacity: 1,000 (500 seated)
- Chairman: Oldřich Reinbergr
- Manager: Lukáš Tuma
- League: Czech Fourth Division - Divize C
- 2025–26: 16th (relegated)
- Website: https://www.fkdobrovice.cz/
Home colours

FK Dobrovice is a Czech football club located in the town of Dobrovice in the Central Bohemian Region. It currently plays in the Czech Fourth Division. The club played Bohemian Football League from 2014 to 2019, but in 2019 the club announced financial problems of its main sponsor and voluntarily moved from 3rd to 5th league.

The club has taken part in the Czech Cup numerous times, reaching the second round in 2004–05, 2007–08 and 2015–16, and the third round in 2014–15.
