= SK Český Brod =

- Full name: SK Český Brod
- Founded: 1898
- Ground: Na Kutilce, Český Brod
- Capacity: 4.200
- Chairman: Michal Mrázek
- Manager: Ondřej Kejha
- League: Czech Fourth Division – Divize B
- 2023–24: 12th

SK Český Brod is a Czech football club from the town of Český Brod. They were founded in 1898. They currently play in Central Bohemian Championship of the Czech regional championships.

== History ==
Former club logo

The SK Český Brod was founded in 1898 by young students named Hyros, Winkler and Lukeš. In 1948 they advanced to the Divize (Division) B and in the 1990s they advanced to the third-level league in the country.

SK Český Brod won the Championship of Brod five times – in 1952, 1956, 1962, 1982 and 1991. In the 1991–92 season the club won Divize C of the Czech Fourth Division. They subsequently played in the third tier Bohemian Football League until being relegated at the end of the 1997–98 season.
