= SFK Vrchovina Nové Město na Moravě =

SFK Nové Město na Moravě
- Full name: SFK Vrchovina z.s. Nové Město na Moravě
- Founded: 1900; 126 years ago
- Ground: Stadion SFK Vrchovina
- Capacity: 1,000
- Chairman: René Horakovský
- Manager: Richard Zeman
- League: Moravian-Silesian Football League
- 2025–26: 7th
- Website: https://www.sfkvrchovina.cz/
Home colours

SFK Nové Město na Moravě is a Czech football club located in the town of Nové Město na Moravě in the Vysočina Region. In the 2017–18 season the club was promoted from the Czech Fourth Division and played in the Moravian–Silesian Football League, which is the third tier of the Czech football system, from 2018 to 2023. In the 2024–25 season the club was promoted again from the Czech Fourth Division to the Moravian–Silesian Football League.

== Czech Cup ==
Club logo until 2014

Nové Město na Moravě has taken part in the national cup a number of times, defeating Czech 2. Liga side FC Vysočina Jihlava and Moravian–Silesian Football League side SK Líšeň on the way to the third round of the 2010–11 Czech Cup.

== Historical names ==
- 1900 — SK Nové Město na Moravě (originally a skating club)
- 1950 — TJ Nové Město na Moravě
- 1998 — Bohemia Breeding
- 2001 — SFK Vrchovina Nové Město - Radešínská Svratka
- 2014 — SFK Vrchovina z.s. Nové Město na Moravě
- 2018 — SFK Nové Město na Moravě
