= TJ Jiskra Ústí nad Orlicí =

Jiskra Ústí n. Orlicí
- Full name: Tělovýchovná jednota Jiskra Ústí nad Orlicí
- Founded: 1914; 112 years ago
- Ground: TJ Jiskra fotbalový stadion
- Capacity: 3,000
- Chairman: Roman Langer
- Manager: Vladimír Chudý
- League: Bohemian Football League B
- 2025–26: 15th (relegated)
- Website: https://www.jiskraustifotbal.cz/
Home colours

TJ Jiskra Ústí nad Orlicí is a Czech football club located in the town of Ústí nad Orlicí in the Pardubice Region. It currently plays in the Bohemian Football League, which is the third level of Czech football.

The team played in the Czech Fourth Division for five seasons between 2002 and 2007 before being relegated. After two seasons, the club returned to the Fourth Division in 2009, where it has since remained.

The club reached the second round of the 2010–11 Czech Cup before being beaten at home by top-flight team SK Sigma Olomouc in front of over one thousand spectators.

== Players ==
=== Current squad ===
As of 20 February 2025.

Note: Flags indicate national team as defined under FIFA eligibility rules; some limited exceptions apply. Players may hold more than one non-FIFA nationality.

| No. | Pos. | Nation | Player |
|---|---|---|---|
| 1 | GK | CZE | Jakub Tlustý |
| 2 | DF | CZE | Michal Kuja |
| 4 | DF | CZE | Patrik Chleboun |
| 5 | DF | CZE | Tomáš Hrnčíř |
| 6 | DF | CZE | Patrik Langer |
| 7 | MF | CZE | Vojtěch Špatenka |
| 8 | MF | CZE | Tomáš Sokol |
| 9 | MF | CZE | Tomáš Hynek |
| 10 | DF | CZE | Marek Táborský |
| 11 | FW | CZE | Jan Bednář |

| No. | Pos. | Nation | Player |
|---|---|---|---|
| 12 | MF | CZE | Josef Stránský |
| 14 | FW | CZE | Michal Zvolánek |
| 15 | MF | CZE | Jan Souček |
| 16 | MF | CZE | Filip Faltus |
| 17 | MF | CZE | Adam Mach |
| 18 | DF | CZE | Jiří Kozák |
| 20 | MF | CZE | David Ráliš |
| 21 | MF | CZE | Filip Hoffman |
| 30 | GK | CZE | Matěj Jeřábek |

== Honours ==
- Czech Fourth Division C
  - Champions 2023–2024
