= SK Zápy =

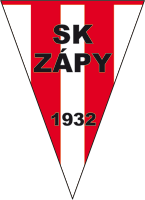
- Full name: Sportovní klub Zápy
- Founded: 1932; 94 years ago
- Ground: Teletník Arena
- Capacity: 1,000
- Chairman: František Hrdlička
- Manager: Martin Poustka
- League: Bohemian Football League B
- 2025–26: 2nd
- Website: https://www.skzapy.cz/
Home colours

SK Zápy is a Czech football club located in the market town of Zápy in the Central Bohemian Region. It currently plays in the Bohemian Football League.

The club won a double in the 2010–11 season, winning the Regional Championship (fifth-tier league) as well as the Ondrášovka Cup competition for the Central Bohemian Region. The 2011–12 saw the club finish second in the Czech Fourth Division and they were subsequently promoted into the third-tier Bohemian Football League in the summer of 2012.
