= SK Senco Doubravka =

Senco Doubravka
- Full name: SK SENCO Doubravka, z.s.
- Founded: 1921
- Ground: Sportovní areál SK SENCO Doubravka
- Capacity: 2,007
- Chairman: Pavel Štverák
- Manager: Daniel Boček jr.
- League: Czech Fourth Division – Divize A
- 2025–26: Divize A, 12th
Home colours

SK Senco Doubravka is a football club located in Plzeň, Czech Republic. The club plays in the Czech Fourth Division as of the 2020–21 season. The club was relegated from Divize A in the Czech Fourth Division at the end of the 2010–11 season, but won promotion back to the same division the following season.
