= FK Hodonín =

- Full name: Fotbalový klub Hodonín
- Founded: 1994; 32 years ago
- Ground: Stadion U Červených domků
- Capacity: 500
- Chairman: Vlastimil Polák
- Manager: Pavol Švantner
- League: Moravian–Silesian Football League
- 2025–26: 2nd
- Website: https://www.fkhodonin.com/
Home colours

FK Hodonín is a Czech football club located in the town of Hodonín. It currently plays in the Moravian-Silesian Football League.

Hodonín won promotion to the Moravian–Silesian Football League in 2017, passing rivals ČSK Uherský Brod on the last day of the season with a 12–2 win over Bystřice nad Pernštejnem to finish first in group D of the Czech Fourth Division. In 2019 the club was relegated to the Czech Fourth Division.

== Czech Cup ==
The team reached the third round of the Czech Cup in 2017–18, defeating Vítkovice 1–0 in the second round.
