= FC Velké Meziříčí =

- Full name: Football Club Velké Meziříčí
- Founded: 1906; 120 years ago
- Ground: Stadion U Tržiště, Velké Meziříčí
- Capacity: 2,500 (250 seated)
- Chairman: Jan Šimáček
- Manager: Martin Kasálek
- League: Czech Fourth Division – Divize D
- 2025–26: 6th
- Website: https://www.fcvm.cz/
Home colours

FC Velké Meziříčí is a Czech football club located in Velké Meziříčí in the Vysočina Region. It currently plays in the Czech Fourth Division, having spent 8 seasons in the third tier of Czech football Moravian–Silesian Football League until 2023.

== Czech Cup ==
In the 2008–09 Czech Cup, Velké Meziříčí played a top-flight team for the first time in its 102-year history, being paired with SK Dynamo České Budějovice. They lost 0–4 in the second round.
