= TJ Sokol Lanžhot =

- Full name: Tělovýchovná jednota Sokol Lanžhot, z.s.
- Founded: 1922; 104 years ago
- Ground: Stadion Na Šlajsi
- Capacity: 5,500
- Chairman: Pavel Tuček
- Manager: Milan Valachovič
- League: Czech Fourth Division - Divize E
- 2025–26: 5th
- Website: https://www.sokol-lanzhot.cz/

TJ Sokol Lanžhot is a Czech football club located in the town of Lanžhot. The club was founded in 1922. It currently plays in the Czech Fourth Division.

== Historical names ==
- 1922 – SK Lanžhot (Sportovní klub Lanžhot)
- 1948 – JTO Sokol Lanžhot (Jednotná tělovýchovná organisace Sokol Lanžhot)
- 1953 – DSO Sokol Lanžhot (Dobrovolná sportovní organisace Sokol Lanžhot)
- 1957 – TJ Sokol Lanžhot (Tělovýchovná jednota Sokol Lanžhot)
- 2010 – TJ Sokol Podluží (Tělovýchovná jednota Sokol Podluží)
- 2010 – TJ Sokol Lanžhot (Tělovýchovná jednota Sokol Lanžhot)
