= FC Slovan Havlíčkův Brod =

- Full name: FC SLOVAN Havlíčkův Brod, z.s.
- Founded: 1911
- Ground: Havlíčkův Brod, Czech Republic
- Capacity: 2,700 (2,000 seated)
- Coordinates: 49°36′17.875″N 15°34′20.377″E
- Chairman: Pavel Mazánek jr.
- Manager: Martin Slavík
- League: Czech Fourth Division – Divize D
- 2025–26: 15th
- Website: https://www.fcslovanhb.cz/
Home colours

FC Slovan Havlíčkův Brod is a Czech football club located in Havlíčkův Brod. It currently plays in the Czech Fourth Division. The club was founded in 1911 and celebrated its centenary in 2011. The club has taken part in the Czech Cup on numerous occasions, reaching the first round in 2007–08.

Former club logo
