= FK Bospor Bohumín =

Bospor Bohumín
- Full name: FK Bospor Bohumín, z.s.
- Founded: 1931
- Ground: Stadion FK Bohumín, Bohumín, Czech Republic
- Capacity: 1,200
- Chairman: Lukáš Fluxa
- Manager: Filip Racko
- League: Czech Fourth Division – Divize F
- 2025–26: 4th
- Website: https://www.fotbalbohumin.cz/
Home colours

FK Bospor Bohumín is a Czech football club, playing in the town of Bohumín. The club was founded in 1931. The club spent two years in the Czech 2. Liga, from the 1993–94 to the 1994–95 season. It currently plays in the Czech Fourth Division (group F), at the fourth tier of Czech football.

== Club's name ==
Former club logo

- 1931 AFK Nový Bohumín
- 1948 AFK Baňská a hutní Bohumín
- 1949 TJ BŽGK Bohumín
- 1953 TJ Baník BŽGK Bohumín
- 1958 TJ ŽD Bohumín
- 1993 FC ŽD Bohumín
- 1994 FC Dipol Bohumín
- 1994 FC Coring Bohumín
- 1996 SK Bohumín
- 199? ŽD Bohumín
- 2006 FK Bohumín
- 2015 FK Bospor Bohumín
