= TJ Sokol Tasovice =

Sokol Tasovice
- Full name: TJ Sokol Tasovice
- Founded: 1946
- Ground: Stadion Tasanda
- Capacity: 1,200
- Chairman: Pavel Houšť
- Manager: Miroslav Paul
- League: Czech Fourth Division – Divize D
- 2025–26: 9th
- Website: https://www.sokoltasovice.cz
Home colours

TJ Sokol Tasovice is a Czech football club located in the village of Tasovice (Znojmo District) in the South Moravian Region. It currently plays in Divize D, which is in the Czech Fourth Division.

In 2011, Tasovice reached the third round of the 2011–12 Czech Cup, where their fans enjoyed a home match against top flight side FK Dukla Prague. Despite the population of the village being only 1,252, the attendance for the game was 1,180. The home side lost by four goals to nil.
