= TJ Jiskra Domažlice =

Czech football club

- Full name: Tělovýchovná jednota Jiskra Domažlice
- Founded: 1908; 118 years ago as SK Šumava
- Ground: Městský stadion Střelnice
- Capacity: 1,160
- Chairman: Jaroslav Ticháček
- Manager: Pavel Vaigl
- League: Bohemian Football League A
- 2025–26: 2nd
- Website: https://www.fotbaldomazlice.cz/
Home colours

TJ Jiskra Domažlice is a Czech football club located in Domažlice. It currently plays in the Bohemian Football League, which is the third tier of the Czech football system.

The team won Divize A, part of the Czech Fourth Division in the 2010–11 season.
