= FC Písek =

- Full name: FC PÍSEK fotbal z.s.
- Founded: 1910; 116 years ago (as SK Písek)
- Ground: Městský sportovní areál Písek
- Capacity: 1,500
- Chairman: Leoš Gornický
- Manager: Milan Nousek
- League: Bohemian Football League A
- 2025–26: 4th
- Website: https://www.fcpisek.cz/
Home colours

FC Písek is a football club located in Písek, Czech Republic. It currently plays in the Bohemian Football League, which is the third tier of the Czech football system.

== History ==
The club was founded in 1910 as SK Písek. In 2008 the club was promoted to the Bohemian Football League (3rd league) and with an exception of 2013–14 season it is a regular participant of this league.

=== Historical names ===
- 1910 – SK Písek (Sportovní klub Písek)
- 1941 – ČASK Písek (Český atletický a sportovní klub Písek) - sloučení s ČAFK Písek
- 1949 – ZSJ ČSSZ Písek (Závodní sportovní jednotka ČSSZ Písek)
- 1951 – DSO Tatran ČSSZ Písek (Dobrovolná sportovní organizace Tatran ČSSZ Písek)
- 1956 – TJ Spartak Písek (Tělovýchovná jednota Spartak Písek) - sloučení s DSO Spartak Písek
- 1966 – TJ Jitex Písek (Tělovýchovná jednota Jihočeské textílie Písek)
- 1990 – VTJ Jitex Písek (Vojenská tělovýchovná jednota Jihočeské textílie Písek) - merger with VTJ Písek
- 1995 – FC Písek (Football Club Písek)
