= FK Turnov =

- Full name: FK Turnov, z.s.
- Founded: 1902
- Chairman: Jiří Šteffan
- Manager: Jiří Štajner
- League: Czech Fourth Division – Divize C
- 2025–26: 5th
- Website: https://www.fkturnov.cz

FK Turnov is a Czech football club located in Turnov. It currently plays in Divize C, which is in the Czech Fourth Division. In 2004, two clubs, FK Pěnčín, who had been playing in the regional championship, and Turnov, who had previously played in the Czech 2. Liga under the names FC Agro and SK Český Ráj, merged to form FK Pěnčín-Turnov.

Club logo until 2016
