= SK Benátky nad Jizerou =

Benátky nad Jizerou
- Full name: SK Benátky nad Jizerou, z.s.
- Founded: 1920
- Ground: Městský stadion (Benátky nad Jizerou)
- Capacity: 4,000 (322 seated)
- Chairman: Marek Mařík
- Manager: Pavel Jícha
- League: Bohemian Football League B
- 2025–26: 6th
- Website: www.kopanabenatky.cz
Home colours	Away colours

SK Benátky nad Jizerou is a Czech football club located in Benátky nad Jizerou. It plays in the Bohemian Football League, the third tier of football in the country.

Benátky was promoted to the Czech Fourth Division in June 2014. In 2015, the club was functioning as a farm team for First League side FK Mladá Boleslav. The club played in the third-tier Bohemian Football League for the first time in its history in the 2015–16 season, and were relegated in 2017–18, their third season in the league. They returned to the third level after finishing second in the 2023–24 Czech Fourth Division.

== Historical names ==
- 1920 – SK Benátky nad Jizerou (Sportovní klub Benátky nad Jizerou)
- 1948 – DSO Sokol Karbo Benátky nad Jizerou (Dobrovolná sportovní organizace Sokol Karbo Benátky nad Jizerou)
- 1953 – TJ Spartak Benátky nad Jizerou (Tělovýchovná jednota Spartak Benátky nad Jizerou)
- 1973 – TJ Karbo Benátky nad Jizerou (Tělovýchovná jednota Karbo Benátky nad Jizerou)
- 1993 – SK Kopaná Karbo Benátky nad Jizerou (Sportovní klub Kopaná Karbo Benátky nad Jizerou)
- 2013 – SK Benátky nad Jizerou (Sportovní klub Benátky nad Jizerou)
