= FK Králův Dvůr =

Czech football club

- Full name: Fotbalový klub Králův Dvůr
- Nickname: Cábelíci
- Founded: 1949; 77 years ago
- Ground: Městský stadion Králův Dvůr
- Capacity: 2,500
- Chairman: Zbyněk Hrabák
- Manager: Petr Janota
- League: Bohemian Football League – Gr. A
- 2025–26: 6th
- Website: https://www.cabelici.cz/
Home colours

FK Králův Dvůr is a football club located in Králův Dvůr, Czech Republic. It currently (2025–26) plays in the Bohemian Football League.

The club, playing in the third division, caused an upset in the second round of the 2012–13 Czech Cup by dumping out top flight side 1. FK Příbram.
