= FK Nový Jičín =

Nový Jičín
- Full name: FK Nový Jičín z.s.
- Founded: 1919; 107 years ago
- Ground: Fotbalový stadion Nový Jičín
- Capacity: 1,500
- Chairman: Pavel Tokař
- Manager: Pavel Kunc
- League: Czech Fourth Division – Divize F
- 2025–26: 13th
- Website: http://www.fknj.cz

FK Nový Jičín is a football club located in Nový Jičín, Czech Republic. It currently plays in Divize F, which is in the Czech Fourth Division.

The team has taken part a number of times in the Czech Cup, reaching the third round in 2000–01. In the 2012–13 Czech Cup the club qualified for the main draw of the cup, winning on penalties against Sokol Lískovec in the qualifying round.

== Historical names ==
Club logo until 2011

- 1922 – SK Slavia Nový Jičín (Sportovní klub Slavia Nový Jičín)
- 1924 – SK Slovan Nový Jičín (Sportovní klub Slovan Nový Jičín)
- 1934 – SK Národní jednota Šenov (Sportovní klub Národní jednota Šenov)
- 1935 (spring) – SK Huckel Nový Jičín (Sportovní klub Huckel Nový Jičín)
- 1935 (autumn) – SK Nový Jičín (Sportovní klub Nový Jičín)
- 1946 – SK Tonak Nový Jičín (Sportovní klub Továrna na klobouky Nový Jičín)
- 1952 – Autopal Nový Jičín
- 1953 – DSO Spartak Nový Jičín (Dobrovolná sportovní organizace Spartak Nový Jičín)
- 1961 – TJ Nový Jičín (Tělovýchovná jednota Nový Jičín)
- 2011 – FK Nový Jičín (Fotbalový klub Nový Jičín)
