= TJ Tatran Bohunice =

- Full name: Tělovýchovná jednota Tatran Bohunice
- Founded: 1929
- Ground: Stadion Tatran Bohunice
- Capacity: 600
- Chairman: Lubomír Němec
- Manager: František Schneider, Zdeněk Partyš
- League: Czech Fourth Division – Divize D
- 2025–26: 3rd
Home colours	Away colours

TJ Tatran Bohunice is a Czech sports club from the district of Bohunice in Brno, founded in 1929 as SK Slavoj Brno-Bohunice. As of 2024 the football club plays in the Czech Fourth Division. The club plays its home games at the Tatran Bohunice Stadium with capacity of 600 people.

== History ==
The club competed in the regional championship, the fifth tier of Czech football, between 2014 and 2022. After playing a single season, 2022–23, in the Czech Fourth Division, the club had an administrative promotion to the third tier. In their sole season playing in the Moravian-Silesian Football League the club finished last, ensuring their immediate relegation to the Fourth Division.

== Other sports ==
TJ Tatran is best known for the success of the association football department within the club. However, TJ Tatran does have departments for other sports such as men's and women's handball.

== Historical names ==
Sources:

- 1929 – SK Slavoj Brno-Bohunice (Sportovní klub (Sports club) Slavoj Brno-Bohunice)
- 1948 – JTO Sokol Brno-Bohunice (Jednotná tělovýchovná organisace (Unified physical education organization) Sokol Brno-Bohunice)
- 1953 – DSO Tatran Brno-Bohunice (Dobrovolná sportovní organisace (Voluntary sports organization) Tatran Bohunice)
- 1956 – TJ Tatran Brno-Bohunice (Tělovýchovná jednota (Physical education unity) Tatran Brno-Bohunice)
- 1991 – Tatran Brno-Bohunice
- 2013 – TJ Tatran Bohunice (Tělovýchovná jednota (Physical education unity) Tatran Bohunice)

== Season-by-season record ==
=== Association football ===
Season	Division	Level	Position	Notes
Czechoslovakia (1946–1993)
1946–47	I. B class, BZMŽF – II. district	4	2nd	Promoted
...
1965–66	I. A class, South Moravia – group A	5	7th	
1966–67	I. A class, South Moravia – group A	5	4th	
...
1991–92	I. A class, South Moravia – group B	6	1st	Promoted
1992–93	Regional Championship (South Moravia)	5	4th	
Czech Republic (1993– )
1993–94	Regional Championship (South Moravia)	5	6th	
1994–95	Regional Championship (South Moravia)	5	3rd	
1995–96	Regional Championship (South Moravia)	5	10th	
1996–97	Regional Championship (South Moravia)	5	10th	
1997–98	Regional Championship (South Moravia)	5	4th	
1998–99	Regional Championship (South Moravia)	5	9th	
1999–00	Regional Championship (South Moravia)	5	4th	
2000–01	Regional Championship (South Moravia)	5	3rd	
2001–02	Regional Championship (South Moravia)	5	3rd	
2002–03	Regional Championship (South Moravia)	5	6th	
2003–04	Regional Championship (South Moravia)	5	3rd	
2004–05	Regional Championship (South Moravia)	5	8th	
2005–06	Regional Championship (South Moravia)	5	7th	
2006–07	Regional Championship (South Moravia)	5	6th	
2007–08	Regional Championship (South Moravia)	5	6th	
2008–09	Regional Championship (South Moravia)	5	9th	
2009–10	Regional Championship (South Moravia)	5	5th	
2010–11	Regional Championship (South Moravia)	5	1st	Promoted
2011–12	Division D	4	14th	
2012–13	Division D	4	14th	
2013–14	Division D	4	16th	Relegated
2014–15	Regional Championship (South Moravia)	5	1st	
2015–16	Regional Championship (South Moravia)	5	2nd	
2016–17	Regional Championship (South Moravia)	5	4th	
2017–18	Regional Championship (South Moravia)	5	2nd	
2018–19	Regional Championship (South Moravia)	5	5th	
2019–20	Regional Championship (South Moravia)	5	1st	Season abandoned
2020–21	Regional Championship (South Moravia)	5	3rd	Season abandoned
2021–22	Regional Championship (South Moravia)	5	1st	Promoted
2022–23	Division D	4	3rd	Promoted
2023–24	Moravian-Silesian Football League	3	17th	Relegated

=== Association football (reserve team; defunct) ===
Season	Division	Level	Position	Notes
Czechoslovakia (1992–1993)
1992–93	City Competition (Brno)	9	8th	
Czech Republic (1993–2015)
1993–94	City Competition (Brno)	9	1st	Promoted
1994–95	City Championship (Brno)	8		
1995–96	City Championship (Brno)	8	7th	
1996–97	City Championship (Brno)	8	6th	
1997–98	City Championship (Brno)	8		
1998–99	City Championship (Brno)	8	3rd	
1999–00	City Championship (Brno)	8		
2000–01	City Championship (Brno)	8	1st	Promoted
2001–02	I. B class, South Moravia – group D	7	11th	
2002–03	I. B class, South Moravia – group B	7	4th	
2003–04	I. B class, South Moravia – group B	7	4th	
2004–05	I. B class, South Moravia – group B	7	9th	
2005–06	I. B class, South Moravia – group B	7	11th	
2006–07	I. B class, South Moravia – group B	7	11th	
2007–08	I. B class, South Moravia – group B	7	13th	Relegated
2008–09	City Championship (Brno)	8	3rd	
2009–10	City Championship (Brno)	8	3rd	
2010–11	City Championship (Brno)	8	4th	
2011–12	City Championship (Brno)	8	4th	
2012–13	City Championship (Brno)	8	2nd	
2013–14	City Championship (Brno)	8	1st	Promoted
2014–15	I. B class, South Moravia – group A	7	8th	Reserve team defunct

=== Men's Czech handball ===
Season	Division	Level	Position	Notes
Czech Republic (2009– )
2009–10	Second League (South Moravia)	3	7th	
2010–11	Second League (South Moravia)	3	8th	
2011–12	Second League (South Moravia)	3	5th	
2012–13	Second League (South Moravia)	3	1st	Promoted
2013–14	First League	2	8th	
2014–15	First League	2	12th	Relegated
2015–16	Second League (South Moravia)	3	1st	Match for promotion (defeat)
2016–17	Second League (South Moravia)	3	5th	
2017–18	Second League (South Moravia)	3	9th	
2018–19	Second League (South Moravia)	3	1st	Match for promotion (defeat)
2019–20	Second League (South Moravia)	3	1st	Season abandoned
2020–21	Second League (South Moravia)	3	2nd	Season abandoned
2021–22	Second League (South Moravia)	3	1st	Promoted
2022–23	First League	2	3rd	
2023–24	First League	2		

=== Women's Czech handball ===
Season	Division	Level	Position	Notes
Czech Republic (2009– )
2009–10	Second League (Moravia)	3	6th	
2010–11	Second League (Moravia)	3	6th	
2011–12	Second League (Moravia)	3	3rd	
2012–13	Second League (Moravia)	3	1st	Promoted
2013–14	First League	2	11th	Relegated
2014–15	Second League (Moravia)	3	7th	
2015–16	Second League (East)	3	4th	
2016–17	Second League (East)	3	4th	
2017–18	Second League (East)	3	3rd	Promoted
2018–19	First League	2	10th	
2019–20	First League	2	11th	Season abandoned
2020–21	First League	2	5th	Season abandoned
2021–22	First League	2	7th	
2022–23	First League	2	9th	
2023–24	First League	2		
