= FC Slavia Karlovy Vary =

- Full name: Football Club Slavia Karlovy Vary
- Founded: 1928; 98 years ago
- Ground: Stadion Karlovy Vary-Dvory
- Capacity: 2,000
- Chairman: Stanislav Štípek
- Manager: Marian Geňo
- League: Czech Fourth Division – Divize B
- 2025–26: 5th
- Website: https://www.slaviakv.cz/

FC Slavia Karlovy Vary is a football club located in Karlovy Vary, Czech Republic. The club currently plays in the Czech Fourth Division. The club took part in the Bohemian Football League, which is the third tier of the Czech football system, between 2003 and 2014, and again between 2018 and 2024.

== Historical names ==
- 1928 — SK Slavia Karlovy Vary
- 2001 — SK BULDOCI Karlovy Vary-Dvory
- 2007 — FC BULDOCI Karlovy Vary
- 2009 — 1. FC Karlovy Vary a.s.
- 2017 — FC Slavia Karlovy Vary
