= ČSK Uherský Brod =

Czech football club

- Full name: Český sportovní klub Uherský Brod
- Founded: 1893; 133 years ago
- Ground: Orelský stadion Uherský Brod
- Capacity: 6,000
- Chairman: Josef Hamšík
- Manager: Roman Dobeš
- League: Divize E
- 2025–26: 1st (promoted)
- Website: https://www.cskub.cz/

ČSK Uherský Brod is a Czech football club located in Uherský Brod. It currently plays in the Moravian-Silesian Football League.

In the 1994–95 season, the club played in the Czech 2. Liga, finishing 15th of 18 teams and being relegated in its only season at such a level. While playing in the Czech Fourth Division, the club reached the third round of the 2003–04 Czech Cup before suffering a heavy 8–0 home defeat against FC Tescoma Zlín.
