= MSK Břeclav =

- Full name: Městský sportovní klub Břeclav
- Founded: 1920
- Ground: Stadion na Lesní ulici Břeclav, Czech Republic
- Capacity: 7,230
- League: Czech Fourth Division - Divize E
- 2025–26: 10th
- Website: https://www.mskbreclav.cz/fotbal
Home colours

MSK Břeclav is a Czech football club located in the town of Břeclav. It currently plays in the Czech Fourth Division. Between 2005 and 2016 the club played in the Moravian-Silesian Football League, the third tier of Czech football. They were relegated in 2016.
