= SK Uničov =

- Full name: SK Uničov z.s.
- Founded: 1935; 91 years ago
- Ground: Areál SK Uničov, Uničov
- Capacity: 1,500
- Chairman: Pavel Nezval
- Manager: David Rojka
- League: Moravian–Silesian Football League
- 2025–26: 4th
- Website: https://www.fotbalunicov.cz/
Home colours	Away colours	Third colours

SK Uničov is a Czech football club located in Uničov, Czech Republic. It currently plays in the Moravian–Silesian Football League, which is the third tier of Czech football.

== Historical names ==
Club logo until 2006

- 1935 – SK Union Uničov
- 1952 – Sokol ZVIL Uničov
- 1953 – DSO Spartak Uničov (Dobrovolná sportovní organizace Spartak Uničov)
- 1966 – TJ Uničovské strojírny Uničov (Tělovýchovná jednota Uničovské strojírny Uničov)
- 1994 – SK UNEX Uničov
- 2006 – SK Uničov

== Colours and Kit ==
SK Uničov have always worn navy blue shirts with white stripes, navy blue shorts and navy blue socks. The team does not have traditional away colours. In 2010/11 the away kit is a yellow shirt with navy blue strips, navy blue shorts and yellow socks, but, as with most teams, they have some more unusual ones.

The kit is currently manufactured by Adidas. Previously, the kit was manufactured by Jako, Joma and Diadora.
