= SK Hranice =

Hranice
- Full name: SK Hranice, z.s.
- Founded: 1920
- Ground: Stadion SK Hranice
- Chairman: Daniel Vitonský
- Manager: Miroslav Matušovič
- League: Moravian-Silesian Football League
- 2025–26: 16th

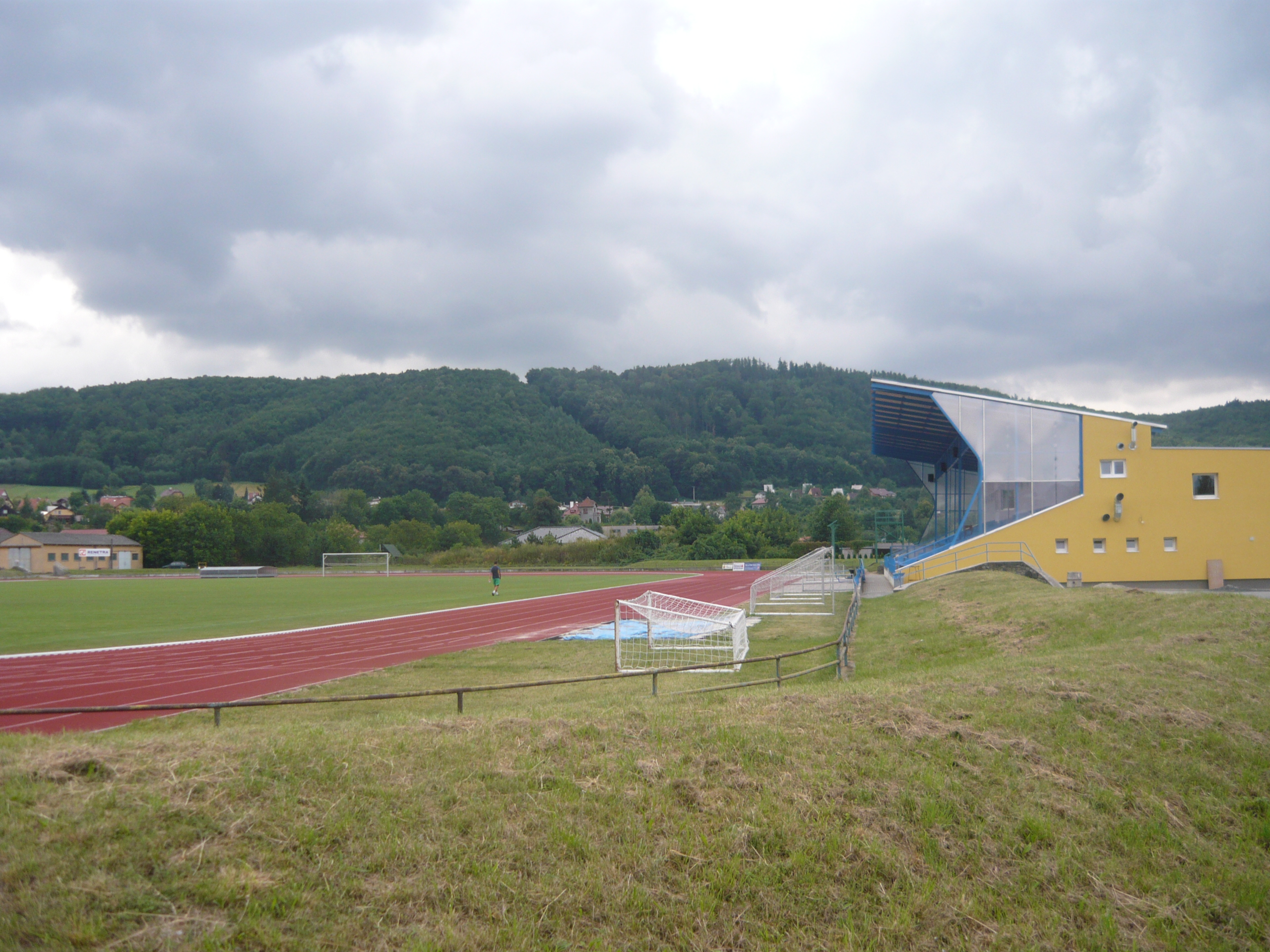
SK Hranice, football pitch

SK Hranice is a Czech football club located in Hranice (Přerov District) in the Olomouc Region. It currently plays in the Moravian-Silesian Football League.

The club has taken part in the Czech Cup on a number of occasions, reaching the third round in 2001–02, 2002–03 and 2004–05.

Former club logo

Hranice played in the Regional Championship (fifth tier) for two years between 2010 and 2012 before winning promotion back to the Czech Fourth Division in June 2012.

The club was given a state subsidy of 1 million Czech koruna in 2012 to help facilitate the reconstruction of their stadium, which was badly affected by the 1997 Central European flood, due to the stadium's proximity to the Bečva. After playing two seasons in the third-tier MSFL, Hranice were relegated at the end of the 2023–24 season. After the 2024–25 season the club was promoted again from the Czech Fourth Division to the MSFL.
