= FC TVD Slavičín =

Slavičín
- Full name: FC TVD Slavičín z.s.
- Founded: 1935
- Ground: Stadion FC TVD Slavičín
- Capacity: 3000
- Chairman: Otto Durďák
- Manager: Pavel Tomeček
- League: Czech Fourth Division – Divize E
- 2025–26: 6th

FC TVD Slavičín is a Czech football club located in Slavičín, Czech Republic. It currently plays in Divize E, which is in the Czech Fourth Division.

The team gained notoriety following a penalty shootout win against Czech First League team Baník Ostrava in the second round of the 2010–11 Czech Cup. At the time, the team was playing in the third-level Moravian–Silesian Football League. A few seasons before, in the third round of the 2004–05 Czech Cup, Slavičín, at the time playing in the Czech Fourth Division beat top flight side Brno, also on penalties.

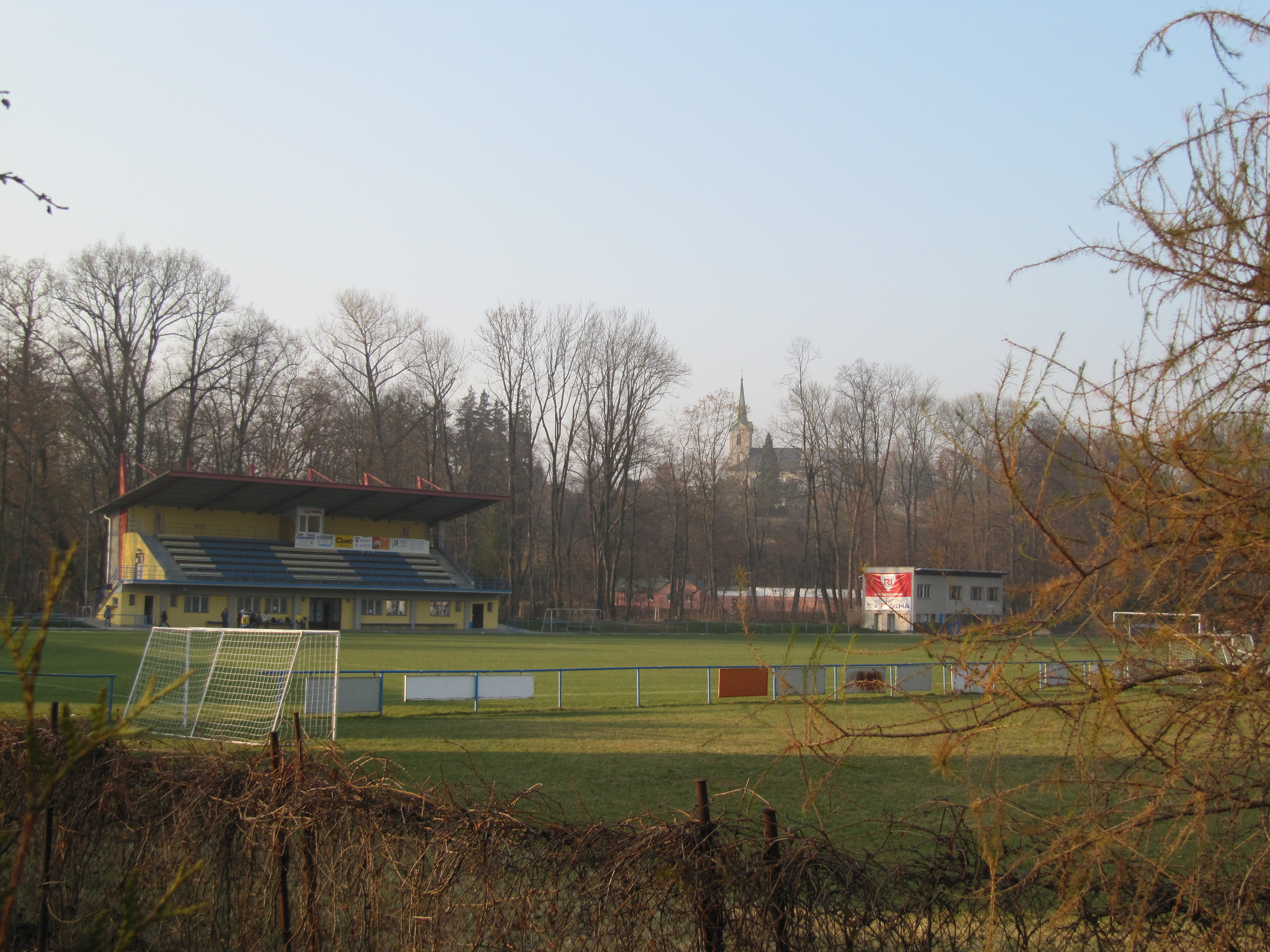
Stadium of FC TVD Slavičín.
