= FK Šumperk =

- Full name: FK Prumrent Šumperk, z.s.
- Founded: 1945
- Ground: Tyršův Stadion, Šumperk
- Coordinates: 49.957050°N 16.978812°E
- Chairman: Ladislav Šabo
- Manager: Radim Netopil
- League: Czech Fourth Division – Divize F
- 2025–26: 8th
- Website: https://fksumperk.cz/
Home colours	Away colours

FK Šumperk is a Czech football club located in Šumperk in the Olomouc Region. The club now plays at the fourth level of Czech football, the Czech Fourth Division.

Club logo until 2025

Since 2011, Šumperk have been the farm team of first tier Fortuna liga club SK Sigma Olomouc.
