= FC Chomutov =

- Full name: FC Chomutov, s.r.o.
- Founded: 1920
- Ground: Letní stadion, Chomutov
- Capacity: 10,000
- Manager: Ladislav Jamrich
- League: Czech Fourth Division – Divize B
- 2023–24: 1st (promoted)
- Website: https://fcchomutov.cz/
Home colours	Away colours

FC Chomutov is a football club located in Chomutov, Czech Republic. It currently plays in the Bohemian Football League.

In the 2000–01, 2001–02 and 2002–03 seasons, the club played in the Czech 2. Liga.

In September 2011, head coach Jiří Černý was sacked following a staggering 12–1 defeat away at Mladá Boleslav B in the Bohemian Football League.

== Players ==
=== Current squad ===
As of 21 February 2025.

Note: Flags indicate national team as defined under FIFA eligibility rules; some limited exceptions apply. Players may hold more than one non-FIFA nationality.

No.	Pos.	Nation	Player
1	GK	CZE	Radek Charvát
3	DF	CZE	Filip Schreiner
4	DF	CZE	Štěpán Holák
5	MF	CZE	Robert Hamouz
6	MF	CZE	Dominik Nobst
7	MF	CZE	Václav Černý
7	MF	CZE	František Mikeš
8	MF	CZE	Alexej Červeňák
9	DF	CZE	Vojtěch Kubík
10	MF	NGA	Daok Plangdi Wilfred

No.	Pos.	Nation	Player
12	MF	GHA	Kwadwo Poku
12	DF	CZE	Radek Kibal
15	FW	CZE	Lukáš Vymyslický
17	FW	CZE	Jan Kopta
20	MF	CZE	Daniel Kováč
27	DF	CZE	Martin Hříbal
—	GK	CZE	Jan Stránský
—	DF	GHA	Zimba Longu Issifu
—	MF	CZE	Kristian Majid

== Honours ==
Club logo until 2016

- Bohemian Football League (third tier)
  - Champions 1999–2000
- Czech Fourth Division B
  - Champions 2023–2024
