= FK Chlumec nad Cidlinou =

Czech football club

- Full name: Fotbalový klub Chlumec nad Cidlinou
- Founded: 4 June 1906
- Ground: Městský fotbalový stadion Chlumec
- President: Martin Firbacher
- Head coach: Tomáš Hrabík
- Website: www.chlumecky-fotbal.com
Home colours

FK Chlumec nad Cidlinou is a Czech football club based in the town of Chlumec nad Cidlinou. From 2019, it played in the Bohemian Football League until its relegation to the Czech Fourth Division. In 2019, Chlumec nad Cidlinou bought the license to play in the 3rd division from SK Převýšov.

== History ==
=== Early years ===
The club was founded on 4 June 1906, but the first idea of founding a football club dates back to 1902. From 1983 to 1987, the club played steadily in the regional championship.

=== Recent years: 2019–present ===
At the beginning of spring 2019, FK Chlumec nad Cidlinou bought the third league license from SK Převýšov. Převýšov did not have the required number of youth teams, which cost the club owner Jiří Ryba at least 500 thousand CZK in fines from the FAČR.

In the same year, Chlumec nad Cidlinou made history by beating Czech First League side Příbram 2–1 with a late winner in the 91st minute in the Czech Cup. They were knocked out in the next round by Viktoria Plzeň in a 4–3 loss.

== Stadium ==
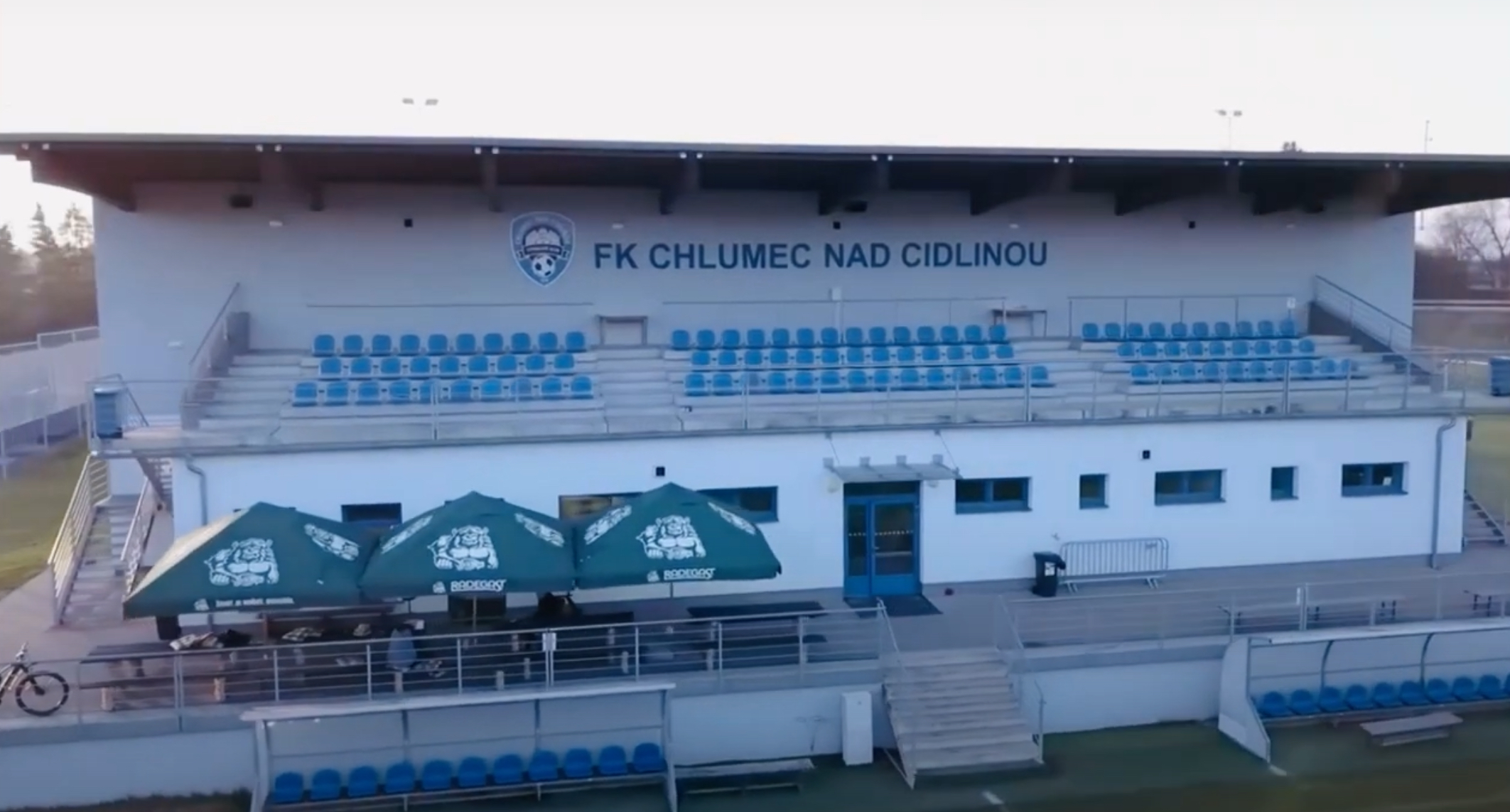
Městský fotbalový stadion Chlumec.

The club plays its home games in the Městský fotbalový stadion Chlumec.

Since 1953, Chlumec Stadium has had a wooden grandstand with five cabins next to the pitch. In the 1990s, sanitary facilities (toilets and showers) with two more cabins were added. However, in the summer of 2013, these areas were razed to the ground and a new grandstand with cabins, a clubhouse, sanitary facilities and a pub was built. In 2009, there was a record attendance, when 2,700 spectators attended a friendly match between Slavia Prague and Hradec Králové. At the ceremonial opening of the new stand in August 2014, 630 spectators were present at the match with Nový Bydžov, which is still the highest attendance of the 2014–15 season at Regional Championship. Another record in terms of attendance was recorded in the 2018–19 season, when 1,170 spectators came to the stands again during the derby with Nový Bydžov. The stadium experienced its largest attendance in 2019 at the Czech Cup match, where FK Chlumec nad Cidlinou played against Viktoria Plzeň. 3,470 spectators came to the match.
