= TJ Valašské Meziříčí =

- Full name: TJ Valašské Meziříčí
- Founded: 1925
- Chairman: Jaromír Odstrčil
- Manager: Radek Malina
- League: Czech Fourth Division – Divize F
- 2025–26: 7th

TJ Valašské Meziříčí (Tělovýchovná jednota Valašské Meziříčí) is a football club located in Valašské Meziříčí, Czech Republic. It currently plays in Czech Fourth Division – Divize E, which is the fourth tier of the Czech football system. In 2017 the club won promotion to the third-tier Moravian-Silesian Football League for the first time in their history. After two seasons the club was relegated at the end of the 2018–19 season, having registered only 5 points across the whole of that season.

== Historical names ==
- 1925 SK Valašské Meziřčí
- 1949 Sokol Valašské Meziříčí
- 1953 Tatran Valašské Meziříčí
- 1958 TJ Valašské Meziříčí
