= SK Sparta Kolín =

- Full name: SK Sparta Kolín, z. s.
- Founded: 1912; 114 years ago
- Ground: Městský stadion
- Capacity: 2,800 (300 seated)
- Chairman: Vladimír Zeman
- Manager: František Douděra
- League: Bohemian Football League B
- 2025–26: 17th (relegated)
- Website: sparta-kolin.cz
Home colours	Away colours

SK Sparta Kolín is a Czech football club located in Kolín. It plays in the Bohemian Football League, the third tier of football in the country. The club played in the Czech 2. Liga in the 2001–02 season and 2014–15 season. The club won the Bohemian Football League in the 2013–14 season and their promotion to the Second League was confirmed in June 2014.

== Historical names ==
Club logo until 2020

- 1912–1948: SK Sparta Kolín
- 1951–1990: TJ Jiskra Kolín
- 1996–2001: FK Mogul Kolín
- 2001–2020: FK Kolín
- 2020–present: SK Sparta Kolín

== Honours ==
- Bohemian Football League (third tier)
  - Champions (2): 2000–01, 2013–14
