= 2007–08 Czech Cup =

Pohár ČMFS

Tournament details
- Country: Czech Republic
- Teams: 129

Final positions
- Champions: Sparta Prague
- Runners-up: Slovan Liberec

Tournament statistics
- Top goal scorer: David Kočián (5 goals)

The 2007–08 Czech Cup was the 15th edition of the annual football knockout tournament organized by the Czech Football Association of the Czech Republic. It began on 22 August 2007 with the preliminary round and ended with the final on 13 May 2008.

Sparta Prague qualified for the 2008–09 UEFA Cup but as they qualified for the Champions League through the Czech First League the same season, the place went to Slovan Liberec as runner-up.

== Teams ==
Round	Clubs remaining	Clubs involved	Winners from previous round	New entries this round	Leagues entering at this round
Preliminary round	129	34	none	34	Levels 4 and 5 in football league pyramid
First round	112	96	17	79	Czech 2. Liga; Bohemian Football League; Moravian-Silesian Football League; Level 4 in football league pyramid
Second round	64	64	48	16	Czech First League
Third round	32	32	32	none	none
Fourth round	16	16	16	none	none
Quarter finals	8	8	8	none	none
Semi finals	4	4	4	none	none
Final	2	2	2	none	none

== Preliminary round ==
The preliminary round was held on 22 August 2007. The 34 participants were teams from fourth level leagues (Divize A, Divize B, Divize C, Divize D, Divize E) and from 5th level leagues (regional championships). Bold teams won and advanced to the first round.

Team 1	Score	Team 2
Meteor Prague VIII	2–2; 5-4 pen	Bzová
Semice^{*}	2–3	Sokol Libiš
Sokol Kamenný újezd^{*}	0–2	Jankov
Rapid Sport Plzeň^{*}	3–2	Senco Doubravka
Spartak Chodov^{*}	1–3	Slavia Vejprnice
Stap Tratec Vilémov^{*}	4–0	Litvínov
Česká Lípa^{*}	1–1; 4-2 pen	Motorlet Prague
Nový Bydžov^{*}	4–1	Chrudim
Sokol Živanice^{*}	3–0	Agria Choceň
Nový Jičín^{*}	1–0	EPO Frenštát pod Radhoštěm
Tatran Brno Bohunice^{*}	1–5	Rostex Vyškov
Vidnava^{*}	3–2	Avízo Město Albrechtice
Rak Provodov^{*}	0–2	Spartak Hulín
Slovan Havlíčkův Brod	2–2; 6-5 pen	Velké Meziříčí
Vsetín	1–2	Velké Karlovice
Ledeč nad Sázavou^{*}	2–2; 2-4 pen	Žďas Žďár nad Sázavou
Sokol Protivanov	2–0	Hranice

^{*} teams from regional championships

== First round ==
The first round was held on 29 July 2007. The 96 participating teams were the 17 winners from the preliminary round and 79 teams from the second, third and fourth level leagues (Czech 2. Liga; ČFL, MSFL; Divize A, Divize B, Divize C, Divize D, Divize E).

Team 1	Score	Team 2
Čelákovice	2–4	FK Kolín
Rakovník	0–4	Union Cheb 2001
Domažlice	0–2	FK Baník Sokolov
FC Písek	2–0	Sezimovo Ústí
Brozany	0–4	Varnsdorf
Pěčín-Turnov	0–1	Dobrovice
Převýšov	1–2	Náchod-Deštné
Dvůr Králové	1–1; 3-2 pen	Velim BB
SK Holice v Čechách	0–4	Letohrad
TJ Sokol Živanice	2–0	Tesla Pardubice
Nový Bydžov	2–1	FK Trutnov
Týniště nad Orlicí	0–1	FC Hradec Králové
Česká Lípa	2–5	Jiskra Nový Bor
Chomutov	1–1; 11-10 pen	K.Vary-Dvory
Vilémov	0–0; 7-6 pen	FK Ústí nad Labem
Vejprnice	2–1	FK Chmel Blšany
Rapid Sport Plzeň	2–3	Klatovy
Jankov	3–4	Jiskra Třeboň
Horažďovice	1–1; 4-3 pen	Prachatice
Strakonice 1908	0–5	FK Marila Příbram
Libiš	4–1	SK Český Brod
Meteor Prague VIII	0–3	FK Dukla Prague
Ovčáry	0–3	Vyšehrad
Votice	2–4	Bohemians (Střížkov) Prague
Králův Dvůr	0–3	Sparta Krč
Admira Prague	0–4	FC Zenit Čáslav
Loko Vltavín	0–1	Vlašim
Bohuslavice	1–3	Orlová
MFK Havířov	1–2	SFC Opava
Vidnava	2–4	Rýmařov
Velké Losiny	1–1; 2-3 pen	SK Uničov
FC TVD Slavičín	0–5	FK Fotbal Třinec
Nový Jičín	0–2	Fotbal F-M
Protivanov	0–4	1. FC Slovácko
Konice	1–0	SK Sulko Zábřeh
Boskovice	0–3	MSK Břeclav
FK Apos Blansko	0–2	FK Mutěnice
Vyškov	1–1; 6-7 pen	SK Líšeň
MKZ Rájec Jestřebí	0–1	1.SC Znojmo
Velké Karlovice	4–2	FK Bystřice p.H.
Viktoria Otrokovice	0–3	Fotbal Fulnek
Framoz Rousínov	0–2	1. HFK Olomouc
SK HS Kroměříž	2–1	Hulín
Havlíčkův Brod	1–2	Žďár n.S.
HFK Třebíč	0–4	Vysočina Jihlava
Cukrovar Hrušovany	0–3	FC Dosta Bystrc
MFK Karviná	1–1; 3-0 pen	FC Hlučín
Dolní Benešov	0–1	FC Vítkovice

== Second round ==
The second round was held on 5 September 2007. The 64 participating teams were the 48 winners from the first round and 16 teams from the Czech First League. Teams in Bold won and advanced to the third round.

Team 1	Score	Team 2
FK Baník Sokolov	1–5	**AC Sparta Prague**
Vyšehrad	0–3	**FK Dukla Prague**
Dvůr Králové	1–4	**Bohemians 1905**
**MSK Břeclav**	1–0	FC Dosta Bystrc
FK Mutěnice	3–4	**1. FC Brno**
FC Žďas Žďár nad Sázavou	2–3	**Vysočina Jihlava**
FK Horažďovice	0–1	**SK Dynamo České Budějovice**
Jiskra Nový Bor	0–2	**FK Union Cheb 2001**
Varnsdorf	0–3	**FK Siad Most**
**FC Chomutov**	4–0	SK Slavia Vejprnice
SK Stap Tratec Vilémov	0–4	**FK Teplice**
SK HS Kroměříž	0–1	**1. HFK Olomouc**
**FK Fotbal Třinec**	1–1; 5-4 pen	FC Tescoma Zlín
SK Uničov	0–3	**1. FC Slovácko**
TJ Sokol Libiš	1–5	**FK Mladá Boleslav**
Dobrovice	1–2	**FK Kolín**
FC Zenit Čáslav	0–2	**FC Slovan Liberec**
**Jiskra Rýmařov**	3–2	SFC Opava
**Sokol Konice**	0–0; 5-4 pen	SK Sigma Olomouc
**Fotbal Fulnek**	5–3	FC Vítkovice
**Fotbal Frýdek-Místek**	2–0	FC Baník Ostrava
Orlová	0–3	**MFK Karviná**
FK Nový Bydžov	0–7	**FK Jablonec 97**
**Jiskra Třeboň**	3–0	FC Písek
Klatovy	0–3	**FC Viktoria Plzeň**
SK Sparta Krč	1–3	**FK Marila Příbram**
**Bohemians (Střížkov) Prague**	1–1; 4-2 pen	SK Kladno
TJ Sokol Živanice	1–3	**FC Hradec Králové**
Vlašim	0–1	**FK Viktoria Žižkov**
**FK Náchod-Deštné**	0–0; 5-4 pen	FK OEZ Letohrad
**SK Líšeň**	2–1	1. SC Znojmo
FC Velké Karlovice	0–4	**SK Slavia Prague**

== Third round ==
The third round was held on 26 September 2007. The 32 participating teams were all winners from the second round. Teams in Bold won and advanced to the fourth round.

Team 1	Score	Team 2
FK Dukla Prague (2)	1–3	**AC Sparta Prague** (1)
MSK Břeclav (3)	0–1	**Bohemians 1905** (1)
FC Vysočina Jihlava (2)	0–2	**1. FC Brno** (1)
FK Union Cheb 2001 (3)	0–1	**SK Dynamo České Budějovice** (1)
**FC Chomutov** (4)	0–0; 5-4 pen	FK SIAD Most (1)
**1. HFK Olomouc** (2)	2–1	FK Teplice (1)
**FK Fotbal Třinec** (2)	0–0; 5-4 pen	1. FC Slovácko (2)
FK Kolín (3)	0–4	**FK Mladá Boleslav** (1)
Jiskra Rýmařov (4)	0–4	**FC Slovan Liberec** (1)
Sokol Konice (4)	1–3	**Fotbal Fulnek** (2)
**Fotbal Frýdek-Místek** (3)	2–1	MFK Karviná (3)
Jiskra Třeboň (4)	0–2	**FK Jablonec 97** (1)
FK Marila Příbram (2)	0–1	**FC Viktoria Plzeň** (1)
**Bohemians (Střížkov) Prague** (2)	1–0	FC Hradec Králové (2)
FK Náchod-Deštné (3)	1–4	**FK Viktoria Žižkov** (1)
**SK Líšeň** (4)	4–3	SK Slavia Prague (1)

== Fourth round ==
The fourth round was held on 10 October 2007. The 16 participating teams were the winners from the third round. Bold teams won and qualified for the quarter-finals.

Team 1	Score	Team 2
AC Sparta Prague (1)	2–0	Bohemians 1905 (1)
SK Dynamo České Budějovice (1)	0–2	1. FC Brno (1)
FC Chomutov (4)	0–3	1. HFK Olomouc (2)
FK Fotbal Třinec (2)	2–1	FK Mladá Boleslav (1)
Fotbal Fulnek (2)	1–1; 3-4 pen	FC Slovan Liberec (1)
Fotbal Frýdek-Místek (3)	1–2	FK Jablonec 97 (1)
Bohemians (Střížkov) Prague (2)	2–0	FC Viktoria Plzeň (1)
SK Líšeň (4)	0–1	FK Viktoria Žižkov (1)

== Quarter-finals ==
The quarter finals were played over two legs on 9 April and 16 April 2008. The 8 participating teams were the winners from the fourth round matches. Bold teams won and progressed to the semi-finals.

Team 1	Agg.	Team 2	1st leg	2nd leg
FK Fotbal Třinec	2–5	FC Slovan Liberec	0–3	2–2
1. HFK Olomouc	2–5	AC Sparta Prague	1–2	1–3
FK Viktoria Žižkov	1–1 (a)	Bohemians (Střížkov) Prague	1–1	0–0
FK Jablonec 97	1–5	1. FC Brno	0–3	1–2

=== First leg ===
9 April 2008	FK Fotbal Třinec	0–3	FC Slovan Liberec	Třinec
16:30 CEST		Report	Papoušek 7'; Frejlach 81'; Dočkal 86'	Stadium: Stadion Rudolfa Labaje; Attendance: 2,221; Referee: Jan Jílek

9 April 2008	1. HFK Olomouc	1–2	AC Sparta Prague	Olomouc
16:30 CEST	Došek 19'	Report	Slepička 65', 69'	Stadium: Stadion FK Holice; Attendance: 1,520; Referee: Jiří Jech

9 April 2008	FK Viktoria Žižkov	1–1	Bohemians (Střížkov) Prague	Prague
16:45 CEST	Koukal 6'	Report	Ibe 66'	Stadium: FK Viktoria Stadion; Attendance: 1,208; Referee: Jiří Adam

9 April 2008	FK Jablonec 97	0–3	1. FC Brno	Jablonec nad Nisou
18:00 CEST		Report	Polách 32'; Besta 36'; Večeřa 83'	Stadium: Stadion Střelnice; Attendance: 2,040; Referee: Pavel Franěk

=== Second leg ===
16 April 2008	FC Slovan Liberec	2–2 (5–2 agg.)	FK Fotbal Třinec	Liberec
17:00 CEST	Radzinevičius 42'; Frejlach 83'	Report	Cieslar 50'; Lukšík 90'	Stadium: Stadion u Nisy; Attendance: 978; Referee: Tomáš Adámek

16 April 2008	Bohemians (Střížkov) Prague	0–0 (1(a)–1 agg.)	FK Viktoria Žižkov	Prague
17:00 CEST		Report		Stadium: Na Chvalech; Attendance: 981; Referee: Radek Matějek

16 April 2008	AC Sparta Prague	3–1 (5–2 agg.)	1. HFK Olomouc	Prague
18:00 CEST	Kulič 22'; Holenda 47'; Kolář 80'	Report	Korčián 48'	Stadium: AXA Arena; Attendance: 1,339; Referee: Petr Ardeleánu

16 April 2008	1. FC Brno	2–1 (5–1 agg.)	FK Jablonec 97	Brno
19:30 CEST	Baláž 45'; Trousil 74'	Report	Michálek 85' (pen.)	Stadium: Městský fotbalový stadion Srbská; Attendance: 1,150; Referee: Petr Mikel

== Semi-finals ==
The semi finals were played on 30 April and 7 May 2008. The 4 participating teams were the winners from the quarter-finals. Bold teams won and qualified for the final.

Team 1	Agg.	Team 2	1st leg	2nd leg
1. FC Brno	3–4	FC Slovan Liberec	2–2	1–2
Bohemians (Střížkov) Prague	0–2	AC Sparta Prague	0–1	0–1

=== First leg ===
30 April 2008	Bohemians (Střížkov) Prague	0–1	AC Sparta Prague	Prague
17:00 CEST		Report	Jeslínek 44'	Stadium: Na Chvalech; Attendance: 1,530; Referee: Tomáš Kocourek

1 May 2008	1. FC Brno	2–2	FC Slovan Liberec	Brno
17:00 CEST	Došek 21'; Pavlík 79' (pen.)	Report	Dočkal 1'; Dort 9' (pen.)	Stadium: Městský fotbalový stadion Srbská; Attendance: 1,308; Referee: Michal Paták

=== Second leg ===
7 May 2008	AC Sparta Prague	1–0 (2–0 agg.)	Bohemians (Střížkov) Prague	Prague
17:00 CEST	Jeslínek 73'	Report		Stadium: AXA Arena; Attendance: 1,339; Referee: Jan Jílek

7 May 2008	FC Slovan Liberec	2–1 (4–3 agg.)	1. FC Brno	Liberec
20:00 CEST	Nezmar 78'; Smetana 90'	Report	Došek 64'	Stadium: Stadion u Nisy; Attendance: 4,665; Referee: Milan Makovička

== Final ==
13 May 2008
17:00 CEST

Slovan Liberec	0–0	Sparta Prague
	Report
Penalties
Radzinevičius (penalty missed); Holeňák (penalty scored); Kerić (penalty scored); Bílek (penalty scored); Dočkal (penalty missed)	3–4	(penalty scored) Kladrubský; (penalty missed) Matušovič; (penalty scored) Horváth; (penalty scored) Kolář; (penalty scored) Kadlec

Stadion Evžena Rošického, Prague
Attendance: 2,865
Referee: Radek Příhoda

FC Slovan Liberec qualified for the 2008–09 UEFA Cup Second Qualifying Round because Sparta Prague had already qualified for European competition through the league.

== Way to the victory ==
As all Czech First League teams, Sparta Prague joined in the second round. They won all six matches. This was their third consecutive victory in the competition.

Round	Home team	1st Leg	2nd Leg	Agg	Away team
2nd	FK Baník Sokolov	1-5		1-5	AC Sparta Prague
3rd	FK Dukla Prague	1-3		1-3	AC Sparta Prague
4th	AC Sparta Prague	2-0		2-0	Bohemians 1905
Quarter final	1. HFK Olomouc	1-2	1-3	2-5	AC Sparta Prague
Semi final	FK Bohemians Prague (Střížkov)	0-1	0-1	0-2	AC Sparta Prague
Final	FC Slovan Liberec	0-0 (p.s. 3–4)		0-0 (p.s. 3–4)	AC Sparta Prague

== See also ==
- 2007–08 Czech First League
- 2007–08 Czech 2. Liga
