= Šilhavý =

Šilhavý (feminine Šilhavá) is a Czech surname. Notable people with the surname include:

- Heidrun Silhavy (born 1956), Austrian politician
- Jaroslav Šilhavý (born 1961), Czech football player and coach
- Josef Šilhavý (born 1946), Czech discus thrower
- Michal Šilhavý (born 1976), Czech footballer
- Thomas J. Silhavy (born 1948), American biologist
- Tomáš Šilhavý (born 1981), Czech footballer
- Zdeňka Šilhavá (born 1954), Czech discus thrower
- Vladimír Šilhavý (1913–1984), Czech arachnologist
