= František Barát =

Czech footballer

Personal information
- Date of birth: 25 July 1950 (age 76)
- Place of birth: Topoľčany, Czechoslovakia
- Position: Midfielder

Managerial career
- Years: Team
- 2006–2007: Příbram
- 2007–2008: Příbram
- 2010–2011: Strakonice
- 2011–2012: Bohemians Prague

František Barát (born 25 July 1950) is a Czech former football player who has also worked as a football manager.

== Career ==
Barát managed Příbram until he was replaced by Italian Massimo Morales in April 2008 after 17 rounds of the 2007–08 Czech 2. Liga. He became manager of SK Strakonice 1908 in September 2010 but left in June 2011, when he was announced as the new manager of Bohemians Prague, replacing Jaromír Jindráček.
