= Jiří Šisler =

Czech footballer

Personal information
- Date of birth: 24 November 1984 (age 41)
- Place of birth: Czechoslovakia
- Position: Midfielder

Senior career*
Years	Team	Apps	(Gls)
2007	→ Bohemians Prague (loan)	?	(9)
2008	Most	4	(0)
2008–2009	→ Kladno (loan)	16	(1)
2009–2010	Bohemians 1905	3	(0)
2009	→ Jihlava (loan)	8	(1)
2010–2011	Čáslav	44	(3)
2011–2012	Bohemians Prague	19	(4)
2012–2016	FC Oberlausitz Neugersdorf	53	(26)
2016–2017	FSV Budissa Bautzen	?	(?)
2017–2020	FV Eintracht Niesky	?	(?)
- * Club domestic league appearances and goals as of 14 June 2014

Jiří Šisler (born 24 November 1984) is a former professional Czech football player, who played in the Czech First League for clubs including Most, Kladno and Bohemians 1905. He played on loan at Bohemians Prague during the first part of the 2007–08 Czech 2. Liga, leading the team with nine league goals. His brother Jan Sisler is also a football midfielder.
