= 2009–10 Czech First League =

17th season of top-tier football league in Czech Republic

Czech First League
- Season: 2009–10
- Champions: Sparta Prague
- Relegated: SK Kladno; FC Bohemians
- Champions League: Sparta Prague
- Europa League: Jablonec; Baník Ostrava; Viktoria Plzeň (via Domestic Cup)
- Matches: 240
- Goals: 574 (2.39 per match)
- Top goalscorer: Michal Ordoš (12)
- Biggest home win: Olomouc 5–0 Brno; Teplice 5–0 SK Kladno
- Biggest away win: Liberec 0–4 Olomouc; FC Bohemians 0–4 Jablonec
- Highest scoring: Olomouc 6–2 Teplice
- Highest attendance: 19,370; Slavia Prague 0–1 Sparta Prague (5 October 2009)
- Lowest attendance: 0 Bohemians 1905 2–0 Olomouc (6 March 2010)
- Average attendance: 4,924

The 2009–10 Czech First League, known as the Gambrinus liga for sponsorship reasons, was the seventeenth season of the Czech Republic's top-tier football. It started on 24 July 2009 and ended on 15 May 2010. Defending champions Slavia Prague could only finish seventh in the league, 21 points behind eventual winners Sparta Prague.

== Team changes from last season ==
FK Viktoria Žižkov and FC Tescoma Zlín were relegated to the second division after finishing last and second to last, respectively, in the 2008–09 Czech First League.

Bohemians 1905 were promoted from the second division as champions. Second division runners-up FC Zenit Čáslav decided not to enter the Czech First League and sold the rights to 1. FC Slovácko, who were promoted in their place.

== Team overview ==
Location of clubs in the 2009–10 Czech First League

Team	Location	Stadium	Capacity
Baník Ostrava	Ostrava	Bazaly	17,372
Bohemians 1905	Prague	Ďolíček Stadion ^{Note 2}	7,500
FC Bohemians	Prague	Stadion Evžena Rošického ^{Note 1}	19,032
1. FC Brno	Brno	Městský fotbalový stadion Srbská	12,550
Dynamo České Budějovice	České Budějovice	E-On Stadion	6,708
FK Jablonec 97	Jablonec	Stadion Střelnice	6,280
SK Kladno	Kladno	Stadion Františka Kloze ^{Note 2}	4,000
FK Mladá Boleslav	Mladá Boleslav	Městský stadion	5,000
1. FK Příbram	Příbram	Na Litavce	9,100
Sigma Olomouc	Olomouc	Andrův stadion	12,072
Slavia Prague	Prague	Synot Tip Arena	21,000
1. FC Slovácko	Uherské Hradiště	Městský fotbalový stadion Miroslava Valenty	8,121
Slovan Liberec	Liberec	Stadion u Nisy	9,900
Sparta Prague	Prague	Generali Arena	20,852
FK Teplice	Teplice	Na Stínadlech	18,221
Viktoria Plzeň	Plzeň	Štruncovy Sady Stadion	7,842

Notes:

1. Bohemians Prague were previously playing at FK Viktoria Stadion, but were not allowed to continue due to league rules regarding under-soil heating. Therefore, Bohemians played their home matches in the 2009–10 season at Stadion Evžena Rošického.
2. Bohemians 1905 and Kladno played one home match each at Stadion Evžena Rošického after the winter break due to under-soil heating requirements.

=== Managerial changes ===
Team	Outgoing manager	Manner of departure	Date of vacancy	Incoming manager	Date of appointment
FC Bohemians	(Czech Republic) Robert Žák	Sacked	17 August 2009	(Czech Republic) Jaromír Jindráček	22 August 2009

== League table ==
Pos	Team	Pld	W	D	L	GF	GA	GD	Pts	Qualification or relegation
1	Sparta Prague (C)	30	16	14	0	42	14	+28	62	Qualification for Champions League second qualifying round
2	Jablonec	30	18	7	5	42	24	+18	61	Qualification for Europa League third qualifying round
3	Baník Ostrava	30	17	9	4	47	25	+22	60	Qualification for Europa League second qualifying round
4	Teplice	30	15	10	5	44	25	+19	55	
5	Viktoria Plzeň	30	12	12	6	42	33	+9	48	Qualification for Europa League third qualifying round (Note: Viktoria Plzeň won the 2009–10 Czech Cup and qualified for the third qualifying round of the UEFA Europa League.)
6	Sigma Olomouc	30	14	5	11	49	36	+13	47	
7	Slavia Prague	30	11	8	11	37	35	+2	41	
8	Mladá Boleslav	30	11	6	13	47	41	+6	39	
9	Slovan Liberec	30	10	7	13	34	39	−5	37	
10	Příbram	30	10	6	14	35	41	−6	36	
11	Brno	30	9	8	13	31	40	−9	35	
12	Bohemians 1905	30	8	10	12	21	29	−8	34	
13	Dynamo České Budějovice	30	7	10	13	24	35	−11	31	
14	Slovácko	30	8	6	16	28	42	−14	30	
15	Kladno (R)	30	7	4	19	24	50	−26	25	Relegation to Czech 2. Liga
16	Bohemians Prague (Střížkov) (Note: Bohemians Prague (Střížkov) were docked 20 points and fined six million koruna because they refused to play against Bohemians 1905 and accused Sigma Olomouc of bribery without presenting evidence. The points deduction was later reduced to 15 points.) (R)	30	4	4	22	27	65	−38	1	Relegation to ČFL (Note: Bohemians Prague (Střížkov) were not awarded a license for the following season's Czech 2. Liga and were therefore automatically relegated to the third-tier ČFL.)

Source: Fortuna liga
Rules for classification: 1) points; 2) goal difference; 3) number of goals scored.
(C) Champions; (R) Relegated

== Results ==
Home \ Away	OST	B05	BOH	BRN	ČBU	JAB	KLA	LIB	MLA	PŘI	SIG	SLA	SLO	SPA	TEP	VPL
Baník Ostrava		3–1	1–0	1–1	0–1	4–1	2–0	1–0	2–2	2–1	2–0	3–1	3–2	1–1	2–2	1–0
Bohemians 1905	0–1		3–0 (Note: The match was awarded to Bohemians 1905 by a score of 3–0 after the visiting team refused to take the pitch.)	0–0	2–0	0–1	0–0	0–1	2–0	1–0	2–0	1–1	0–1	0–2	1–1	0–1
Bohemians Prague (Střížkov)	0–3	0–0		2–1	0–2	0–4	1–4	2–1	2–4	1–0	0–2	0–1	1–1	2–3	1–3	2–2
Brno	1–1	1–2	0–0		0–3	0–1	3–0	1–0	2–3	2–1	1–2	2–0	1–0	1–1	2–3	2–2
Dynamo České Budějovice	1–2	0–0	3–0	1–3		1–1	0–0	1–1	1–3	2–1	2–1	0–1	0–0	0–0	0–0	0–0
Jablonec	2–1	3–0	1–0	1–0	2–0		1–0	2–1	1–0	0–0	3–1	1–1	3–2	0–0	0–0	0–1
Kladno	0–3	1–2	3–2	1–0	2–1	1–2		1–2	1–3	0–2	2–3	0–2	1–0	0–1	0–2	1–3
Slovan Liberec	0–1	1–1	2–3	0–1	3–0	4–2	1–1		3–0	1–0	0–4	1–1	2–0	2–2	1–0	0–2
Mladá Boleslav	3–1	0–1	4–2	0–0	0–1	1–2	0–1	4–1		2–0	2–2	0–1	3–2	1–2	0–1	4–0
Příbram	1–1	2–0	3–2	3–1	3–1	1–2	3–2	1–1	2–2		2–1	1–0	2–0	1–1	0–3	1–0
Sigma Olomouc	0–0	1–1	3–0	5–0	2–0	0–1	1–2	2–0	1–2	3–1		3–1	1–0	1–1	6–2	1–0
Slavia Prague	3–1	3–0	3–1	3–1	3–2	0–3	0–0	0–2	1–1	3–0	1–2		3–0	0–1	0–0	0–0
Slovácko	0–2	1–1	2–0	0–2	1–0	1–1	2–0	0–0	1–0	2–1	2–0	3–1		0–1	0–2	2–3
Sparta Prague	1–1	0–0	1–0	3–0	1–1	2–0	2–0	2–0	1–0	1–1	4–0	1–0	4–0		1–0	0–0
Teplice	0–1	1–0	2–1	0–1	3–0	1–0	5–0	2–0	2–2	1–0	1–1	1–1	2–1	0–0		2–1
Viktoria Plzeň	0–0	3–0	3–2	1–1	0–0	1–1	1–0	2–3	2–1	3–1	1–0	4–2	2–2	2–2	2–2	

Source: Fortuna liga
Legend: Blue = home team win; Yellow = draw; Red = away team win.

== Top goalscorers ==
Rank	Player	Club	Goals
1	(Czech Republic) Michal Ordoš	Sigma Olomouc	12
2	(Czech Republic) David Lafata	FK Jablonec	11
2	(Czech Republic) Marek Kulič	Mladá Boleslav	11
4	(Czech Republic) Pavel Šultes	Sigma Olomouc	9
4	(Ivory Coast) Bony Wilfried	Sparta Prague	9
6	(Czech Republic) Mario Lička	Baník Ostrava	8
6	(Czech Republic) Daniel Huňa	1. FK Příbram	8

== Attendances ==
#	Club	Average
1	Sparta Praha	10,766
2	Slavia Praha	9,783
3	Baník Ostrava	7,346
4	Bohemians 1905	6,045
5	Slovácko	5,723
6	Teplice	5,307
7	Slovan Liberec	4,384
8	Sigma Olomouc	4,351
9	Jablonec	3,878
10	Brno	3,649
11	Viktoria Plzeň	3,629
12	Mladá Boleslav	3,580
13	Příbram	3,276
14	České Budějovice	3,258
15	Kladno	2,109
16	Bohemians	1,307

== See also ==
- 2009–10 Czech Cup
- 2009–10 Czech 2. Liga
