= Lukáš Krbeček =

Czech footballer

Personal information
- Date of birth: 27 October 1985 (age 41)
- Place of birth: Cheb, Czechoslovakia
- Height: 1.87 m (6 ft 1 1/2 in)
- Position: Goalkeeper

Youth career
- 1990–1993: TJ Agro Cheb
- 1993–1995: FK Zlín
- 1995–1997: FK Teplice
- 1997–2004: Viktoria Plzeň

Senior career*
| Years | Team | Apps | (Gls) |
| 2004–2014 | FC Viktoria Plzeň | 18 | (0) |
| 2008–2010 | → 1. FK Příbram (loan) | 38 | (0) |
| 2011 | → FC Zbrojovka Brno (loan) | 6 | (0) |
| 2011–2012 | → FC Baník Ostrava (loan) | 2 | (0) |
| 2012 | → FC Chomutov (loan) | ? | (?) |
| 2013 | → FK Bohemians Praha (loan) | 3 | (0) |
| 2013–2014 | → FK Baník Sokolov (loan) | 5 | (0) |
| 2014–2015 | 1. FK Příbram | 2 | (0) |
| 2015 | Slavoj Vyšehrad | 9 | (0) |
| 2016–2017 | SpVgg Bayern Hof | 17 | (0) |
- * Club domestic league appearances and goals as of 25 August 2017

Lukáš Krbeček (born 27 October 1985) is a Czech former footballer.
