= Petr Pavlík =

Petr Pavlík may refer to:

- Petr Pavlík (footballer, born 1987), Czech footballer
- Petr Pavlík (footballer, born 1978), Czech footballer
