= FC Bohemians Praha =

FC Bohemians Praha may refer to the following Czech football clubs based in Prague:

- Bohemians 1905, a club re-established by ex-staff of the original Bohemians Praha, widely considered as the successor of the traditional club
- FK Bohemians Prague (Střížkov), formerly FC Střížkov Praha 9, a club that in 2005 bought the name and colours of Bohemians.
