= Radim Nečas =

Czech football manager & player (born 1969)

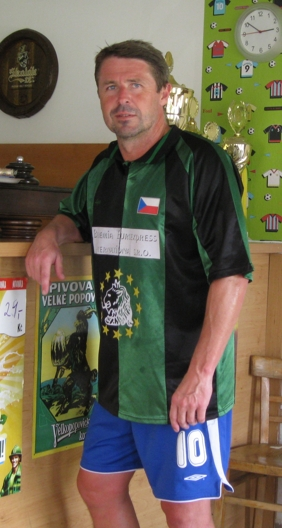

Personal information
- Date of birth: 26 August 1969 (age 57)
- Place of birth: Valtice, Czechoslovakia
- Position: Midfielder

Senior career*
Years	Team	Apps	(Gls)
1987–1992	FC Baník Ostrava	133	(41)
1992–1994	SK Slavia Prague	59	(11)
1994–1996	Union Cheb	43	(12)
1996	Skoda Xanthi	19	(2)
1996–2000	Jablonec	95	(16)
2000	Slavia Prague	10	(0)
2001–2003	Slovan Bratislava	46	(6)
Total		405	(88)

International career
1988–1992	Czechoslovakia U21	28	(6)
1995–2000	Czech Republic	4	(0)

Managerial career
- 2006: FK Bohemians Prague (Střížkov)
- 2010: FK Senica
- 2010–2011: Arsenal Česká Lípa
- 2012–2013: Arsenal Česká Lípa
- 2013–2014: Dečić Tuzi
- 2014: FK Kolín
- 2015: FK Fotbal Třinec
- 2016–2018: FK Teplice (assistant)
- 2025: Arsenal Česká Lípa
- 2025–: Motorlet Prague
- * Club domestic league appearances and goals

Radim Nečas (born 26 August 1969) is a Czech football manager and former player. He played for the Czech Republic four times between 1995 and 2000. Nečas made more than 300 top-flight appearances spanning the existence of the Czechoslovak First League and the Czech First League. He also played top-flight football in Greece and Slovakia.

Nečas became the most expensive player in the history of Czech football in 1992 when Slavia Prague signed him from Baník Ostrava for 25 million Czechoslovak koruna.

== Playing career ==
=== Club ===
Nečas started his professional career at Baník Ostrava in 1987, where he played for five years. One of the highlights of Nečas' time at Ostrava was scoring from a free kick at Bazaly in the first round of the 1990–91 UEFA Cup against Aston Villa. The same season, Nečas won the Czechoslovak Cup with Ostrava.

Nečas became the most expensive player in the history of Czech football in 1992, when he left Ostrava for Slavia Prague for a fee of 25 million Czechoslovak koruna. Two years later, he went to Cheb and then on to Greek side Skoda Xanthi in December 1995. When he returned to the Czech Republic, he played for Jablonec, where he won the 1997–98 Czech Cup. He returned to Slavia in 2000, playing and scoring in the second round of the 2000–01 UEFA Cup against OFI. In January 2001 he signed for Slovak club Slovan Bratislava. He played for Bratislava for two years before returning to the Czech Republic in 2003, where he signed for Bohemian Football League team Chrudim.

=== International ===
Nečas started playing for the national youth teams of Czechoslovakia in 1984, making a combined total of 47 appearances over four years at age groups from under-15 to under-18. In 1988, he made his first appearance for Czechoslovakia U21; he went on to make 28 appearances and score six goals during his four years with the team.

He made his full international debut for the Czech Republic in a friendly match against Slovakia on 8 May 1995. He played in another friendly match later the same year, against Kuwait, but it was 1998 before he made his third appearance, again in a friendly, this time against Slovenia. His fourth and final appearance was at the 2000 Carlsberg Cup tournament in a match against Mexico.

Czech Republic national team
Year	Apps	Goals
1995	2	0
1998	1	0
2000	1	0
Total	4	0

== Management career ==
In the summer of 2006, Nečas took over at Bohemian Football League side FK Bohemians Prague (Střížkov), replacing Luboš Urban. However his tenure lasted just five matches before he was dismissed, having lost only once during this period.

In 2007, Nečas joined Čáslav as assistant to manager Luboš Zákostelský.

In September 2007, Nečas joined Czech First League side Liberec as assistant to manager Michal Zach. Although Zach left his position in October 2007, Nečas continued in his position under replacement manager Ladislav Škorpil until they were both sacked, along with other assistant coach Luboš Kozel in November 2009.

Nečas went to Slovakia to manage FK Senica in February 2010 during the 2009–10 Slovak Superliga. At the beginning of the 2010–11 season he went back to the Czech Republic and joined another Bohemian Football League club, Arsenal Česká Lípa. Having steered the club to mid-table safety, with the club in 11th position with just two games remaining, it was announced that Nečas would leave Česká Lípa at the end of the season.

In the summer of 2011, Nečas joined Sezimovo Ústí in the Czech 2. Liga as assistant manager to Luboš Zákostelský.

Nečas returned to Česká Lípa as manager in October 2012, achieving a win in his first match in charge.

In October 2013 he took charge of FK Dečić in the Montenegrin First League. He took over from Roman Veselý as the manager of FK Kolín in March 2014, and the club celebrated the league title and promotion to the Czech National Football League at the end of the 2013–14 season.

In March 2025, Nečas returned to coach Arsenal Česká Lípa in the Bohemian Football League.

In December 2025, Nečas was appointed manager of Motorlet Prague in the Bohemian Football League.

=== Managerial statistics ===
As of 13 September 2006

Team	Nat	From	To	Record				
Team	Nat	From	To	P	W	D	L	Win %
Bohemians Prague	Czech Republic	28 June 2006	13 September 2006	5	1	3	1	20

== Personal ==
The son of Radim Nečas, also called Radim, is also a professional footballer.

== Honours ==
=== As a player ===
==== Club ====
Baník Ostrava

- Czechoslovak Cup: 1990–91

Jablonec

- Czech Cup: 1997–98
