= Robert Žák =

Czech footballer & manager (born 1966)

Personal information
- Date of birth: 6 May 1966 (age 60)
- Place of birth: Strakonice, Czechoslovakia
- Position: Midfielder

Senior career*
Years	Team	Apps	(Gls)
1987–1990	Slavia Prague	87	(12)
1991–1992	Hradec Králové	12	(4)
1993–1994	České Budějovice	39	(6)
Total		138	(22)

Managerial career
- 2004–2005: České Budějovice
- 2007–2009: Most
- 2009: Bohemians Prague
- 2010: Litvínov
- * Club domestic league appearances and goals

Robert Žák (born 6 May 1966) is a Czech football manager and former player.

As a player, he played in the Czechoslovak First League until its conclusion in 1993, after which he continued in the Czech First League for one season before finishing his professional playing career in 1994.

He has managed three clubs in the Czech First League, firstly České Budějovice followed by Most and most recently Bohemians Prague.

== Playing career ==
As a player, Žák played as a midfielder. He played a total of 111 matches and scored 18 goals in the Czechoslovak First League, representing Slavia Prague, Hradec Králové and České Budějovice before the league's discontinuation in 1993. After the formation of the Czech First League in 1993, Zak went on to play one more league season, playing 27 matches and scoring 4 goals for České Budějovice.

== Management career ==
Žák's first position as a football manager commenced in October 2004, when he was announced as the replacement for Pavel Tobiáš at Czech First League side České Budějovice. He signed a two-year contract with the club, although due to a run of seven consecutive defeats which left the club last in the table, he was replaced by František Cipro in March 2005.

Žák was appointed manager at Most in the summer of 2007, replacing outgoing manager Zdeněk Ščasný. He had previously worked with the youth teams at the club. Most finished the 2007–08 season in last place and were relegated to the Czech 2. Liga, although Žák refused to resign despite pressure from fans to do so. He was finally relieved of his duties at Most three matches before the end of the 2008–09 season.

Žák was appointed as manager of Bohemians Prague, replacing Luboš Urban before the start of the 2009–10 Czech First League. Despite his recent appointment, Žák was the first league manager of the season to lose his job in August 2009, with the club failing to score any points in their opening four league matches.

Žák took over at Litvínov of the Czech Fourth Division in the summer of 2010. His spell in charge lasted just a short time as he was sacked in September 2010 following a run of four matches without scoring a point.
