= Stadion Františka Kloze =

Multi-use stadium in Kladno, Czech Republic

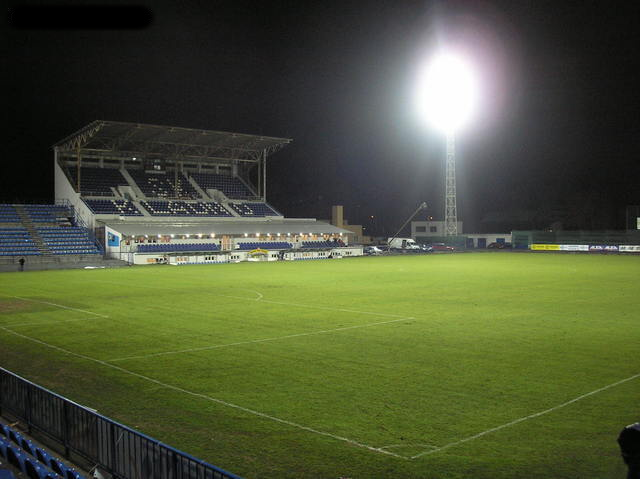
- Interactive map of Stadion Františka Kloze
- Location: Františka Kloze, Kladno, Czech Republic, 272 01
- Coordinates: 50°8′18.01″N 14°5′24.515″E
- Owner: SK Kladno
- Capacity: 3,804
- Surface: Grass
- Field size: 105m x 68m

Construction
- Opened: 25 October 1914
- Renovated: 1951, 1988

Tenant
- SK Kladno

Stadion Františka Kloze is a multi-use stadium in Kladno, Czech Republic. It is currently used mostly for football matches and is the home ground of SK Kladno. The stadium holds 4,000 people and was opened in 1914. It is named after former player František Kloz, situated by the street also named after him.

The pitch was relaid in July 2007 ahead of the 2007–08 Czech First League. The city of Kladno mooted plans to purchase the stadium for 45 million Czech koruna from the club in December 2008, owing to SK Kladno's financial difficulties. The Ministry of Finance subsequently blocked the sale in early 2009. In the 2009–10 season, Stadion Františka Kloze was one of five stadiums not compliant with the Stadiony 2012 project. Due to the lack of under-soil heating, SK Kladno were unable to use their stadium for the last two autumn matches and first four spring matches, which were moved to Prague's Stadion Evžena Rošického.
