= Jindráček =

Jindráček (feminine Jindráčková) is a Czech surname. Notable people with the surname include:

- Jaromír Jindráček (born 1970), Czech footballer and manager
- Martin Jindráček (born 1989), Czech footballer
