= Michal Šilhavý =

Czech footballer and coach

Personal information
- Date of birth: 29 May 1976 (age 50)
- Place of birth: Czechoslovakia
- Position: Goalkeeper

Senior career*
Years	Team	Apps	(Gls)
1994–1995	Viktoria Žižkov		
1996	Dolní Benešov		
1996–1997	Viktoria Žižkov		
1998	Mladá Boleslav		
1998	Dukla Příbram		
1999–2000	Sparta Krč		
2000–2001	Viktoria Plzeň		
2002	FC Slovan Liberec B		
2002–2003	Baník Most		
2004–2005	Budapest Honvéd		
2005–2007	Sparta Krč		
2007–2008	Thể Công		
2008–2009	Song Lam		
2009–2010	HAGL		
2011	FK Kunice		

Managerial career
- 2013–2014: FC Zličín
- * Club domestic league appearances and goals

Michal Šilhavý (born 29 May 1976) is a Czech retired football player and coach.

== Vietnam ==
Moving to Thể Công of the V.League 1 through his Hungarian mentor at Budapest Honvéd, Silhavy was surprised at the penurious state of locals there and did not settle in well in his first few months, despite earning a salary higher than what he had in the Czech lower leagues. One of five foreign imports, the Czech goalkeeper mixed with two Brazilians, a Hungarian and a Cameroonian, helping The Cong get 14 points from their first seven rounds. He then switched to HAGL in 2009 making a penalty save to spearhead HAGL to the 2010 Vietnamese Cup final which they lost.

On the level of the Vietnamese league, Silhavy commented that it was very technical and focused on attack.
