= Jaroslav Šilhavý =

Czech footballer and manager

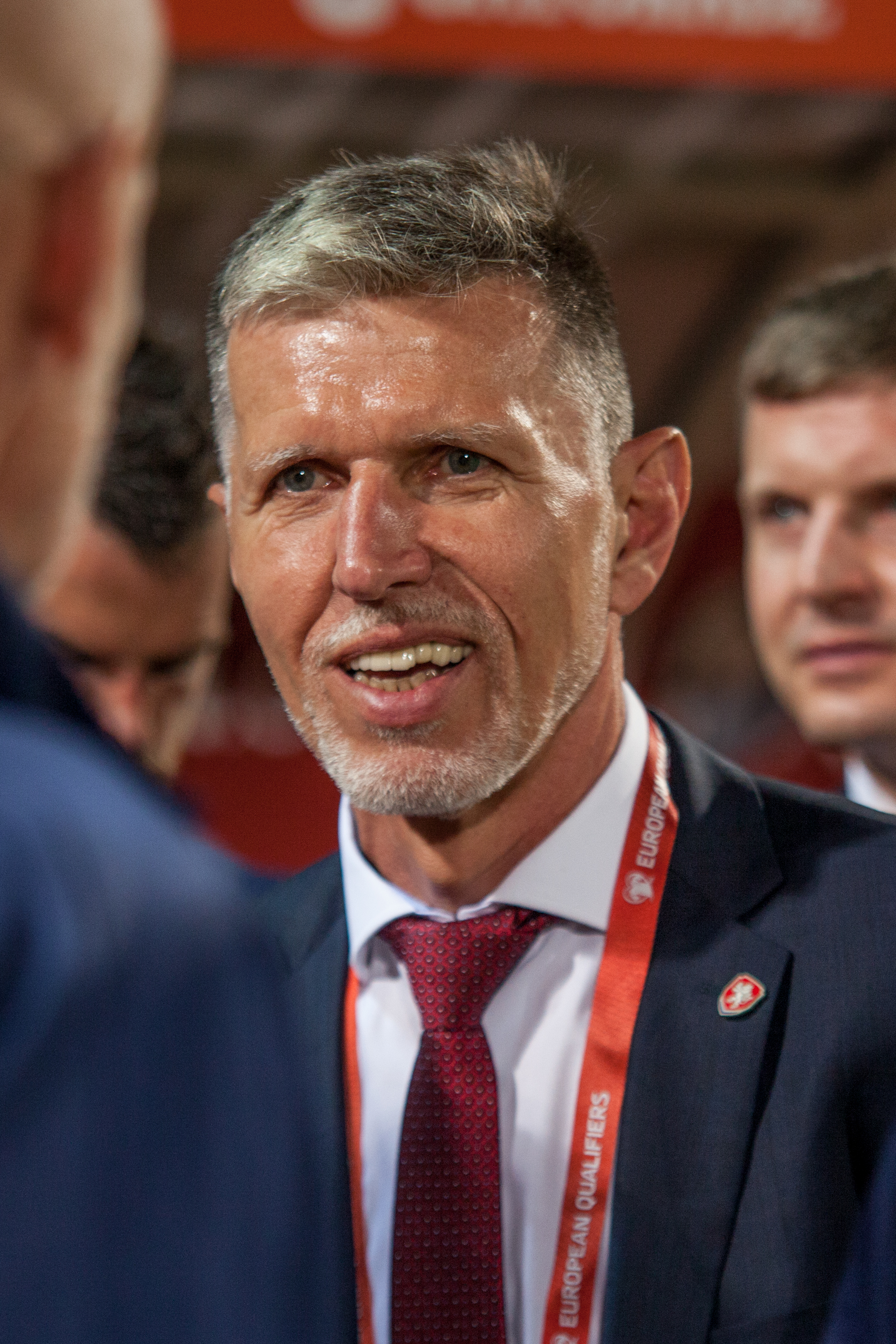
- Šilhavý in 2019

Personal information
- Date of birth: 3 November 1961 (age 64)
- Place of birth: Plzeň, Czechoslovakia
- Position: Defender

Youth career
- 1967–1975: TJ Chotěšov
- 1975–1978: ČSAD Plzeň
- 1978–1979: Škoda Plzeň

Senior career*
Years	Team	Apps	(Gls)
1979–1980	Škoda Plzeň	8	(0)
1980–1990	RH Cheb	243	(9)
1990–1994	Slavia Prague	83	(3)
1994–1997	Petra Drnovice	69	(8)
1997–1999	Viktoria Žižkov	62	(5)
Total		465	(25)

International career
1980–1988	Czechoslovakia U21	18	(0)
1990–1991	Czechoslovakia	4	(0)
1992	Czechoslovakia B	1	(0)

Managerial career
- 2005–2007: Sparta Prague B
- 2007–2008: SK Kladno
- 2008: Viktoria Plzeň
- 2001–2009: Czech Republic (assistant)
- 2009–2011: Dynamo České Budějovice
- 2011–2014: Slovan Liberec
- 2014–2015: FK Baumit Jablonec
- 2016: FK Dukla Prague
- 2016–2017: Slavia Prague
- 2018–2023: Czech Republic
- 2024: Oman
- * Club domestic league appearances and goals

Jaroslav Šilhavý (Czech pronunciation: [ˈjaroslaf ˈʃɪlhaviː]; born 3 November 1961) is a Czech professional football manager and former player.

As a player, Šilhavý made a total of 464 top flight appearances spanning the end of the Czechoslovak First League and the beginning of the Czech First League, scoring 25 goals. His 464 appearances was a Czech league record until 6 November 2022, when Šilhavý was surpassed by Milan Petržela. His son, Tomáš Šilhavý, also played football in the Czech First League.

As a manager, Šilhavý won the 2011–12 Czech First League with Slovan Liberec. He has also had spells managing other top flight clubs in the Czech Republic, including Kladno, Viktoria Plzeň and Dynamo České Budějovice. He was an assistant manager for the Czech Republic national team from 2001 to 2009 before eventually taking full charge in 2018, later resigning in 2023 after qualifying the team for UEFA Euro 2024. In 2024, he was appointed the head coach of Oman, but last only seven months.

== Club career ==
As a player, Šilhavý played as a defender. Born in Plzeň, he started playing at the top level in the 1979–80 Czechoslovak First League for Škoda Plzeň. He subsequently played for ten years with RH Cheb before moving to Slavia Prague partway through the 1989–90 Czechoslovak First League.

At Slavia, Šilhavý was part of the team which finished second in the 1992–93 Czechoslovak First League. After four years in Prague, he moved to Petra Drnovice to continue his footballing career. He moved back to Prague in 1997, this time to play for Viktoria Žižkov, where he served as club captain. While at Žižkov, he won the 1998 Personality of the League award at the Czech Footballer of the Year awards.

During his playing career, Šilhavý became known for the record number of red cards he collected in the Czech First League, which still remains unbeaten as of 2023. He collected 9 red cards, the same as three other players, but with the lowest number of matches played. Combined with the Czechoslovak First League, he collected a total of 12 red cards.

== International career ==
Šilhavý played for the Czechoslovakia U21 national team for eight years, some of these as an authorised over-age player. In this time he made 18 appearances for his country.

Šilhavý represented Czechoslovakia four times as a player, making his debut against Finland on 29 August 1990. His final appearance for the full national side was on 27 March 1991, when he played eight minutes of a match against Poland. He also played one match, in 1992, for Czechoslovakia B.

== Managerial career ==
Following his career as a player, Šilhavý became assistant manager to Zdeněk Ščasný at Viktoria Žižkov. He also joined the Czech national team set-up as a coach in December 2001, a position he continued to hold until April 2009.

Šilhavý joined Czech First League side Kladno as manager in 2007, signing a one-year deal. Kladno subsequently finished 14th in the 2007–08 Czech First League, one place above the relegation zone.

In May 2008, Šilhavý was named as the new manager of Viktoria Plzeň, although his tenure only lasted nine matches, during which time the club won just once. He was relieved of his duties in October 2008.

He took up his post at Dynamo České Budějovice on 14 October 2009, replacing Pavel Tobiáš at the club, who were bottom of the league at that time. Budějovice finished the season in 13th place and avoided relegation. The following season, in the 2010–11 Czech First League, Šilhavý led České Budějovice to a final position of 11th in the league table.

In June 2011, Šilhavý was announced as the replacement for outgoing coach Petr Rada as manager of FC Slovan Liberec. Liberec started the season well, reaching second place in the league behind Sparta after seven games. The club finished the 2011–12 Czech First League in first place, winning the league and qualifying for the UEFA Champions League.

Šilhavý replaced Luboš Kozel as manager of FK Dukla Prague in May 2016, signing a three-year contract. He joined Slavia Prague in September of the same year.

=== Czech Republic ===
In September 2018, Šilhavý replaced Karel Jarolím as head coach of the Czech Republic national football team. His debut came in a 2–1 victory against Slovakia in the 2018–19 UEFA Nations League.

Šilhavý led the Czech Republic in Group E of the UEFA Euro 2024 qualifying. They opened their qualification campaign with a victory over Poland, though unexpected poor results against Moldova and Albania led to rising criticism regarding the team.

On 20 November 2023, following a 3–0 victory over Moldova in the final qualifying match that resulted in the Czech Republic qualifying for the final tournament, Šilhavý stated that he would not extend his contract with the national team.

=== Oman ===
On 1 February 2024, Šilhavý was announced as the manager of the Oman national football team, signing a two-year contract. He was sacked on 19 September after poor performances in the 2026 FIFA World Cup qualification.
