= Zbyněk Busta =

Czech football manager

Personal information
- Date of birth: 10 March 1967 (age 59)
- Place of birth: Czechoslovakia

Team information
- Current team: Povltavská FA (manager)

Managerial career
- Years: Team
- 2005–2008: Bohemians 1905
- 2008–2010: Varnsdorf
- 2011: Kladno
- 2012: Písek
- 2013: Most
- 2014: Hvozdnice
- 2016–2019: Štěchovice
- 2022–: Povltavská FA

Zbyněk Busta (born 10 March 1967) is a Czech football manager, currently the manager of Povltavská FA. He managed Bohemians 1905 in the 2007–08 Czech First League.

Busta led Bohemians 1905, resigning with six matches of the 2007–08 Czech First League remaining.

On 7 July 2008 Busta signed a contract with third league club, FK Varnsdorf. On 26 August 2010, he left the club, after three matches of the 2010–11 Czech 2. Liga.

In October 2011 Busta took over at Kladno. During the winter break of the 2011–12 season, Busta moved to Písek, saving them from relegation from the Bohemian Football League in his tenancy before leaving in June 2012.

After the first match of the spring part of the 2012–13 Czech 2. Liga, Busta replaced Michal Zach as manager of Most.

In August 2014 after match against Všenory manager of Hvozdnice Busta pushed assistant referee Petr Chovanec and was banned for nine months by disciplinary commission.

Busta was appointed to the manager's position at third league club Štěchovice in November 2015 following the resignation of Jiří Hruška.
