= Luboš Urban =

Czech footballer and manager

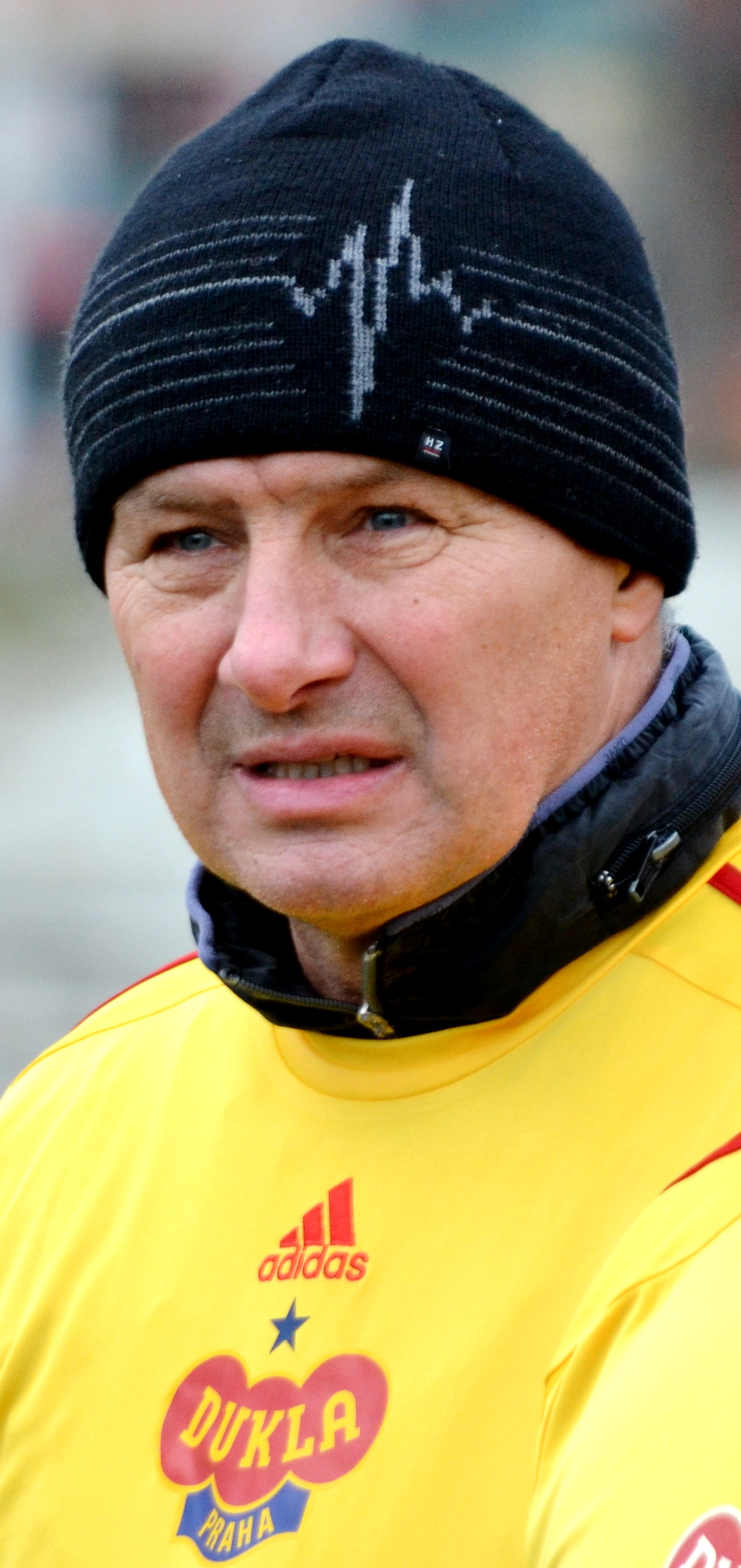
- Luboš Urban in 2013

Personal information
- Date of birth: 19 November 1957 (age 68)
- Place of birth: Jihlava, Czechoslovakia
- Position: Midfielder

Senior career*
Years	Team	Apps	(Gls)
1975–1978	DP Xaverov Horní Počernice		
1978–1982	LIAZ Jablonec		
1982–1988	Dukla Prague		
1988–1989	Škoda Plzeň		
1989–1990	DP Xaverov Horní Počernice		
1990–1994	US Ivry		
1994–1995	SK Spolana Neratovice		
1995–2004	SK Černolice		

Managerial career
- 1999–2000: FC Viktoria Plzeň
- 2000–2002: FC MUS Most 1996
- 2004–2005: Břevnov
- 2005–2006: FK Bohemians Prague (Střížkov)
- 2006–2009: FK Bohemians Prague (Střížkov)
- 2009–2010: FC Vysočina Jihlava
- 2011–2012: Vlašim
- 2012–2014: FC Chomutov
- 2014–2015: Dynamo České Budějovice
- * Club domestic league appearances and goals

Luboš Urban (born 19 November 1957 in Jihlava) is a Czech football manager and former player.

== Playing career ==
Urban played football for Dukla Prague and Plzeň.

== Early managerial career ==
Urban was sacked as the manager of FC Viktoria Plzeň in October 2000. He had been leading the team in the 2000–01 Gambrinus liga.

Urban was appointed as the manager of Most in December 2000, becoming the club's fourth manager in a year. Having led Most to an eight-game unbeaten streak in the spring, he signed a contract extension in May 2001 for the next season. He was relieved of his duties five games before the end of the season in the 2001–02 Czech 2. Liga, after a sequence of six home games without a win.

In early 2004, Urban took over at Břevnov in the Bohemian Football League. He stayed at Břevnov until taking over at Bohemians in October 2005.

== Bohemians ==
After leading the team to a third-place finish in the 2005–06 Bohemian Football League, Urban's contract was not renewed and Radim Nečas was appointed as his successor. However, after just five rounds of the 2006–07 season, Urban was reinstated as boss. Bohemians went on to finish the season as champions, winning the Bohemian Football League four games before the end of the season and claiming promotion to the Czech 2. Liga.

The following season, the 2007–08 Czech 2. Liga, Urban led Bohemians Prague to the Czech 2. Liga title in their first season. This was their second successive promotion. The following season, the 2008–09 Gambrinus liga, he led the club to a mid-table position. Following the end of the season, Urban's contract was not renewed and he left after three years at Bohemians.

== Return to 2. Liga ==
In June 2009, Urban joined Czech 2. Liga side FC Vysočina Jihlava. He remained in the position until October 2010, when Urban finished at Jihlava.

In December 2011, Urban was announced as the new manager of Czech 2. Liga club Vlašim, taking over from Roman Nádvorník. After leading Vlašim to 11th place in the 2011–12 Czech 2. Liga, Urban's contract was not renewed and Martin Frýdek was brought in to replace him as the manager.

== Honours ==
=== Managerial ===
Bohemians Prague

- Czech 2. Liga (1): 2007–08
- Bohemian Football League (1): 2006–07

Dynamo České Budějovice

- Czech 2. Liga (1): 2013–14
