= FC Žďas Žďár nad Sázavou =

Žďár nad Sázavou
- Full name: FC Žďas Žďár nad Sázavou, z.s.
- Founded: 1930
- Ground: Stadion Bouchalky
- Chairman: Pavel Vašek
- Manager: Václav Pohanka
- League: Czech Fourth Division – Divize D
- 2025–26: 10th
- Website: https://www.fczdas.cz/
Home colours

FC Žďas Žďár nad Sázavou is a Czech football club located in Žďár nad Sázavou in the Vysočina Region. It currently plays in the Czech Fourth Division.

Since 2004, the club's best result in the Czech Cup has been getting to the second round, which they did in the 2007–08 season.

In the summer of 2011, the club made many changes to their squad, something unknown in the years before.
