= SK Sparta Krč =

Sparta Krč 1910, z.s.
- Full name: Sparta Krč 1910
- Founded: 1910
- Ground: ABC Braník; Prague
- League: A4A, 2. class, group A
- 2025–26: 9th
Home colours	Away colours

Sparta Krč 1910 is a football club from Prague, Czech Republic. It plays in the ninth level of Czech football.

In 2007–08, the club played in the Czech 2. Liga.

After finishing second behind Bohemians Prague in the 2006–07 Bohemian Football League, Sparta Krč was promoted to the 2. Liga. After being relegated in their only season in the 2. Liga, the club finished third in the 2008–09 Bohemian Football League, and elected to play the following season in the fifth-tier Prague Championship.
