= Michal Zach =

Czech football manager (born 1969)

Personal information
- Date of birth: 21 March 1969 (age 57)
- Place of birth: Prague, Czechoslovakia

Team information
- Current team: Sparta Prague B (assistant)

Managerial career
- Years: Team
- 2002–2004: Baník Most
- 2004–2005: Ústí nad Labem
- 2007: Slovan Liberec (assistant)
- 2008: Bohemians 1905 (assistant)
- 2009–2011: Sydney FC (assistant)
- 2011–2013: Baník Most
- 2020–2021: Slavoj Vyšehrad
- 2022–2026: Loko Prague
- 2026–: Sparta Prague B (assistant)

Michal Zach (born 21 March 1969) is a Czech football manager. He managed FC Slovan Liberec and Bohemians 1905 in the 2007–08 Czech First League.

== Early career ==
Zach managed Most in the 2003–04 Czech 2. Liga. He lost his position in May 2004 following a series of five consecutive defeats.

Zach managed Ústí nad Labem in the 2004–05 Czech 2. Liga but was replaced before the end of the season.

After serving as assistant manager to Vítězslav Lavička at Liberec, Zach became manager as Lavička's replacement in May 2007. In October 2007, after winning just one of nine league games in charge, Zach left Liberec. In November 2007 he joined Bohemians 1905 as assistant to Zbyněk Busta and went on to lead the team as caretaker manager following Busta's resignation with six matches of the 2007–08 Czech First League remaining.

== Australia ==
In 2009 Zach moved to Sydney FC as the assistant manager to compatriot Vítězslav Lavička. Lavička and Zach extended their deals in 2010. In January 2011, it was announced that Zach would be leaving Sydney and returning to the Czech Republic following the expiry of his contract on 31 March.

== Return to the Czech Republic ==
On 22 June 2011, Zach was announced as the new manager of Czech 2. Liga side Most. He remained in his position until after the first match of the spring part of the 2012–13 Czech 2. Liga, being replaced by Zbyněk Busta. In July 2022, Zach was announced as the new manager of Czech 2. Liga side Loko Prague.
