= Jaromír Jindráček =

Czech former football player (born 1970)

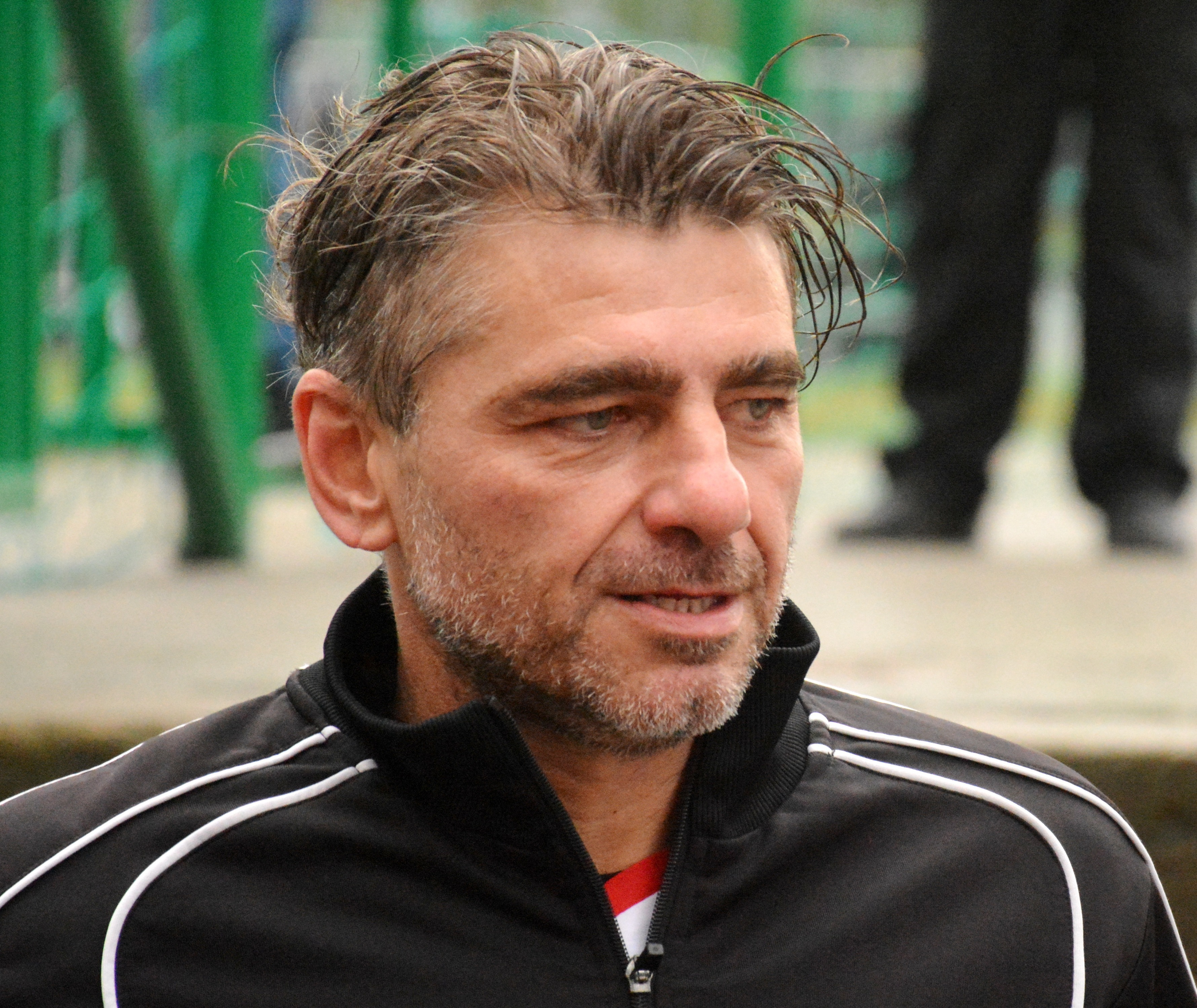

Personal information
- Full name: Jaromír Jindráček
- Date of birth: 1 February 1970 (age 56)
- Place of birth: Czechoslovakia
- Height: 1.83 m (6 ft 0 in)
- Position: Midfielder

Senior career*
Years	Team	Apps	(Gls)
1993–1995	SK České Budějovice JČE	38	(3)
1995–1996	FC Union Cheb	29	(9)
1996–1997	SK Slavia Prague	21	(4)
1997	FK Jablonec 97	12	(1)
1998–2000	FK Teplice	61	(13)
Total		161	(30)

Managerial career
- 2009–2011: Bohemians Prague
- 2012: Bohemians Prague
- 2013–: Bohemians Prague (women)
- 2026–: Slavoj Vyšehrad (assistant)
- * Club domestic league appearances and goals

Jaromír Jindráček (born 1 February 1970) is a Czech former football player who later became a football manager. He played in the Czech First League for seven seasons, representing five different clubs.

He was appointed head coach of Czech First League team Bohemians Prague in August 2009, replacing Robert Žák. After relegation from the Czech First League in his first season, he led Bohemians to first place with a record 80 points in the Bohemian Football League in the 2010–11 season. He left his position in June 2011, when he was replaced by František Barát. He returned to Bohemians in 2012 but was replaced by Ivan Pihávek in October 2012, having held a record of one win, seven draws and one loss in the first nine league games of the season.
