= Fotbal Fulnek =

- Full name: Fotbal Fulnek
- Founded: 1947
- Ground: Stadion Fulnek
- Capacity: 1,200
Home colours	Away colours

Fotbal Fulnek is an association football team from Fulnek in the Czech Republic, as of the 2022–23 season they don't play in any level of the Czech football league. In the 2009–2010 season, the club played in the Moravian–Silesian Football League (third-level league) but did not fulfil their fixtures and their results for the season were expunged in February 2010.

The best achievement of the club was a presence in the Second League in the 2007–08 and 2008–09 seasons.

== Honours ==
- Moravian–Silesian Football League (third tier)
  - Champions 2006–07
