= Tomáš Frejlach =

Czech footballer

Personal information
- Date of birth: 24 November 1985 (age 40)
- Place of birth: Čáslav, Czechoslovakia
- Height: 1.79 m (5 ft 10 in)
- Position: Midfielder

Youth career
- 1995–1998: SK Sparta Kutná Hora
- 1998–1999: Zenit Čáslav
- 1999–2001: SK Sparta Kutná Hora
- 2001–2005: FK Kolín

Senior career*
Years	Team	Apps	(Gls)
2005–2006	FK Marila Příbram	17	(4)
2006–2010	FC Slovan Liberec	63	(3)
2010–2011	FC Baník Ostrava	25	(4)
2011–2014	SK Slavia Praha	8	(0)
2013	→ FC Zbrojovka Brno (loan)	13	(3)
2014	SK Sparta Kutná Hora		

International career
2006	Czech Republic U-21	8	(3)
- * Club domestic league appearances and goals as of 7 January 2023

Tomáš Frejlach (born 24 November 1985 in Čáslav) is a Czech former football midfielder.

Frejlach also played for the Czech youth national teams at the under-19 and under-21 levels.
