= David Korčián =

Czech footballer

Personal information
- Date of birth: 3 April 1986 (age 40)
- Place of birth: Czechoslovakia
- Height: 1.78 m (5 ft 10 in)
- Position: Forward

Team information
- Current team: 1. HFK Olomouc
- Number: 15

Senior career*
Years	Team	Apps	(Gls)
2005	Opava	1	(0)
2005	Drnovice		
2006–2009	HFK Olomouc	52	(9)
2009–2010	Jihlava		
2010–2011	Opava		
2011–	HFK Olomouc		
- * Club domestic league appearances and goals as of 1 July 2011

David Korčián (born 3 April 1986) is a Czech footballer, who plays as a forward. He currently plays for 1. HFK Olomouc.
