= Tomáš Šilhavý =

Czech footballer

Personal information
- Date of birth: 3 January 1981 (age 45)
- Place of birth: Czechoslovakia
- Position: Defender

Senior career*
Years	Team	Apps	(Gls)
2001–2005	Slavia Prague	9	(0)
2003	→ Chmel Blšany (loan)	0	(0)
2004–2005	→ Ústí nad Labem (loan)		
2009–2010	Vlašim	1	(0)

International career
2003	Czech Republic U21	3	(0)

Managerial career
- 2017: Králův Dvůr (assistant)
- 2018–2024: Králův Dvůr
- 2024–2026: Hradec Králové B
- 2026–: Hradec Králové (assistant)
- * Club domestic league appearances and goals

Tomáš Šilhavý (born 3 January 1981) is a Czech former footballer, who played in the Czech First League for Slavia Prague. He is the son of the record-holder of the most number of league starts, Jaroslav Šilhavý.
