= Zdeněk Koukal =

Czech footballer (born 1984)

Personal information
- Date of birth: 14 March 1984 (age 42)
- Place of birth: Czechoslovakia
- Height: 1.82 m (5 ft 11 1/2 in)
- Position: Defender

Youth career
- 1991–1992: FC Vilshofen
- 1993–2002: Bohemians Prague

Senior career*
Years	Team	Apps	(Gls)
2002–2003	Bohemians Prague	13	(0)
2003	→ Pardubice (loan)		
2004	Bohemians Prague		
2004–2006	Teplice	7	(0)
2006	→ Vysočina Jihlava (loan)	4	(0)
2007	Baník Sokolov		
2007	Teplice	6	(0)
2008–2010	Viktoria Žižkov	38	(2)
2010–2013	Baník Ostrava	9	(2)
2011	→ Příbram (loan)	25	(9)
2013–2014	Viktoria Plzeň		
2014	Viktoria Žižkov		
2014–2015	Králův Dvůr		
2015	Baník Most 1909		
2015–2016	Motorlet Prague		
2016	Kingston City		
2016–2017	Motorlet Prague		

International career
2004	Czech Republic U21	3	(0)

Managerial career
- 2017–2018: MAS Táborsko (assistant)
- 2018: Karviná (assistant)
- 2019: Písek (assistant)
- 2020–2021: Viktoria Žižkov (youth)
- 2021: Viktoria Žižkov B
- 2021: Viktoria Žižkov (caretaker)
- 2022: Viktoria Žižkov (caretaker)
- 2023–2025: Zápy
- 2025: Motorlet Prague
- 2026–: Sellier & Bellot Vlašim (assistant)
- * Club domestic league appearances and goals as of 25 October 2011

Zdeněk Koukal (born 14 March 1984) is a Czech coach and former football player.

Koukal is a son of a former footballer, who played for Bohemians Prague. He started his football career in Germany, where his father was playing at that time. Since 1993, he played for Bohemians Prague. During subsequent years, he several times changed his teams. He played for Czech 2. Liga teams and Czech First League sides FK Teplice and FK Viktoria Žižkov. In 2010, Koukal was transferred to FC Baník Ostrava.
