= Heidrun Silhavy =

Austrian politician (born 1956)

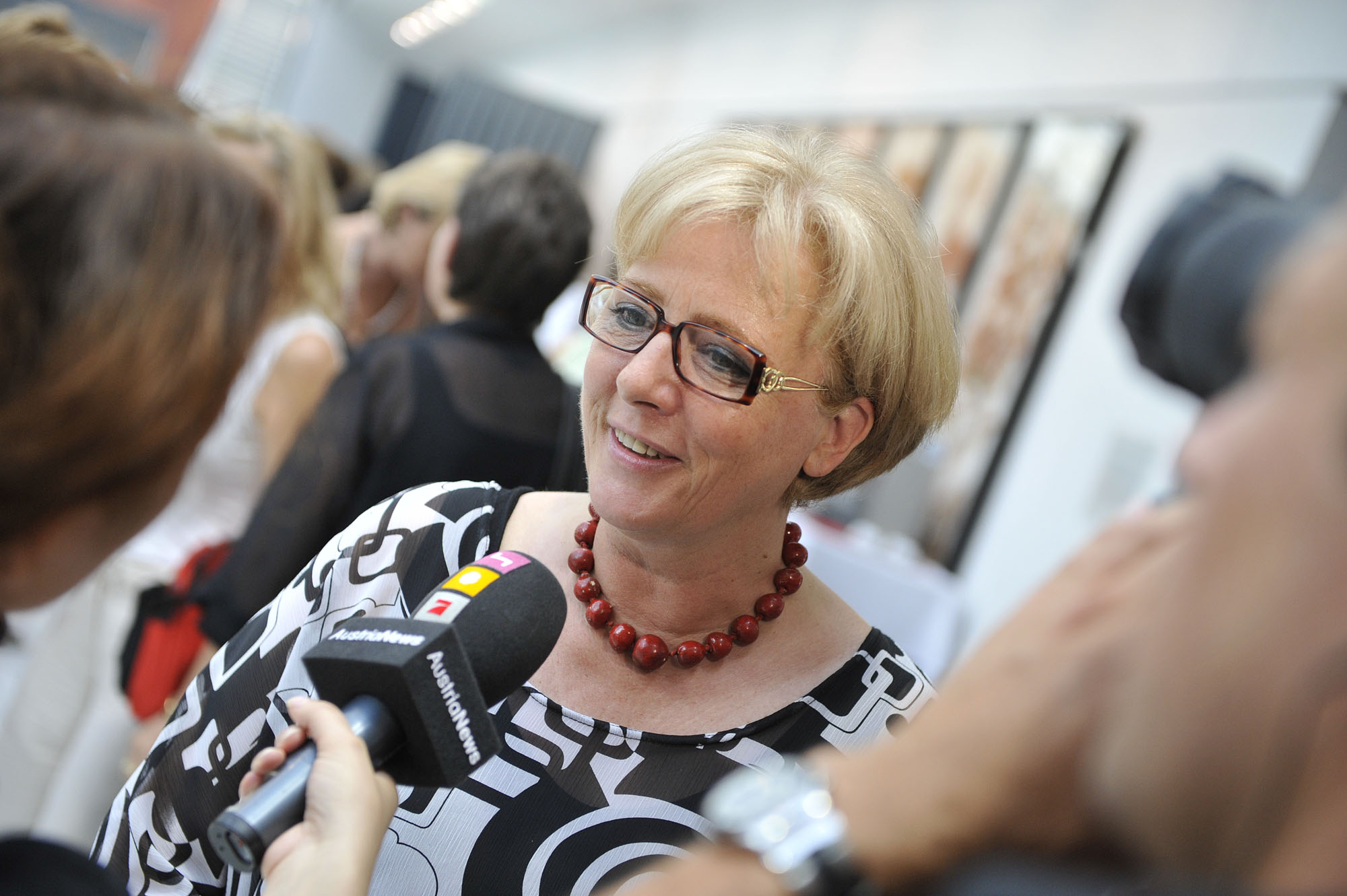
Silhavy in 2008

Heidrun Silhavy (born 20 May 1956) is an Austrian politician who was Minister for Women, Media and Public Service in 2008.

Silhavy was born and grew up in Graz. After completing the Matura she worked for the Chamber for Workers and Employees. She continued her career in the trade unions until becoming a member of the National Council in 1994. She later became deputy chairperson of the Social Democratic Party of Austria (SPÖ). She received the Grand Decoration of Honour in Silver with Star for Services to the Republic of Austria in 2004. She held a leading position in the Austrian Trade Union Federation and was offered the role of deputy president of the organisation in 2009, which she however declined.

Chancellor Alfred Gusenbauer made her part of his cabinet. She was state secretary at the Chancellery from 11 January 2007, and then succeeded Doris Bures as Minister for Women, Media and Public Service in July 2008. When the government dissolved in December of the same year after early elections, Silhavy reverted to being a member of parliament until the next election in 2013, when she did not run.
