= 2007–08 Czech 2. Liga =

2. česká fotbalová liga
- Season: 2007–08
- Champions: Bohemians Prague
- Promoted: Bohemians Prague; Marila Příbram
- Relegated: Hlučín; Krč
- Matches played: 240
- Goals scored: 558 (2.33 per match)
- Top goalscorer: Petr Faldyna (13)
- Average attendance: 1,276

The 2007–08 Czech 2. Liga was the 15th season of the 2. česká fotbalová liga, the second tier of the Czech football league.

== Team changes ==
=== From 2. Liga ===
Promoted to Czech First League

- FK Viktoria Žižkov
- Bohemians 1905

Relegated to Moravian-Silesian Football League

- Sigma Olomouc "B"
- Dosta Bystrc

Relegated to Bohemian Football League

- Blšany

Relegated to 1.A třída (level 6)

- Jakubčovice

=== To 2. Liga ===
Relegated from Czech First League

- FK Marila Příbram
- 1. FC Slovácko

Promoted from Bohemian Football League

- FK Bohemians Praha (Střížkov)
- SK Sparta Krč

Promoted from Moravian-Silesian Football League

- Fotbal Fulnek

Promoted

- FK Dukla Prague

== League table ==
Pos	Team	Pld	W	D	L	GF	GA	GD	Pts	Promotion or relegation
1	Bohemians Prague (Střížkov) (C, P)	30	15	8	7	46	38	+8	53	Promotion to 2008–09 1. Liga
2	Příbram (P)	30	14	10	6	33	18	+15	52	Promotion to 2008–09 1. Liga
3	Opava	30	15	5	10	46	31	+15	50 (Note: OPA 2–0 HRA; HRA 0–1 OPA)	
4	Hradec Králové	30	13	11	6	34	24	+10	50	
5	Slovácko	30	13	9	8	40	27	+13	48	
6	Fulnek	30	12	11	7	36	36	0	47	
7	Jihlava	30	11	10	9	42	35	+7	43	
8	HFK Olomouc	30	11	8	11	33	38	−5	41	
9	Sokolov	30	9	13	8	26	24	+2	40	
10	Třinec	30	10	6	14	26	39	−13	36 (Note: TRI 1–1 VIT; VIT 0–2 TRI)	
11	Vítkovice	30	10	6	14	35	41	−6	36	
12	Ústí nad Labem	30	9	7	14	35	44	−9	34	
13	Čáslav	30	8	9	13	37	44	−7	33 (Note: CAS 2–0 DUK; DUK 2–2 CAS)	
14	Dukla Prague	30	9	6	15	36	44	−8	33	
15	Hlučín (R)	30	7	9	14	26	35	−9	30	Relegation to 2008–09 MSFL
16	Krč (R)	30	4	12	14	27	40	−13	24	Relegation to 2008–09 ČFL

Source: The Football Association of the Czech Republic
Rules for classification: 1) points; 2) head-to-head points; 3) head-to-head goal difference; 4) head-to-head goals scored; 5) goal difference; 6) number of goals scored.
(C) Champions; (P) Promoted; (R) Relegated

== Top goalscorers ==
Rank	Scorer	Club	Goals
1	(Czech Republic) Petr Faldyna	Jihlava	13
2	(Czech Republic) Libor Kozák	Opava	11
3	(Czech Republic) Daniel Huňa	Marila Příbram	10
4	(Czech Republic) Aleš Chmelníček	Slovácko	9
4	(Czech Republic) Jiří Šisler	Bohemians Prague	9
6	(Czech Republic) Pavel Simr	Jihlava	8
6	(Czech Republic) Jan Svatonský	FK Dukla Prague	8
8	(Czech Republic) Václav Pilař	Hradec Králové	7
8	(Slovakia) Martin Prohászka	Vítkovice	7
8	(Czech Republic) Michal Schön	Vítkovice	7
8	(Czech Republic) Ondřej Smetana	Fulnek	7
8	(Czech Republic) Miloslav Strnad	Čáslav	7
8	(Czech Republic) Pavel Šultes	Slovácko	7
8	Vlastní	Vítkovice	7

== See also ==
- 2007–08 Czech First League
- 2007–08 Czech Cup
