= Petr Pavlík (footballer, born 1978) =

Czech footballer

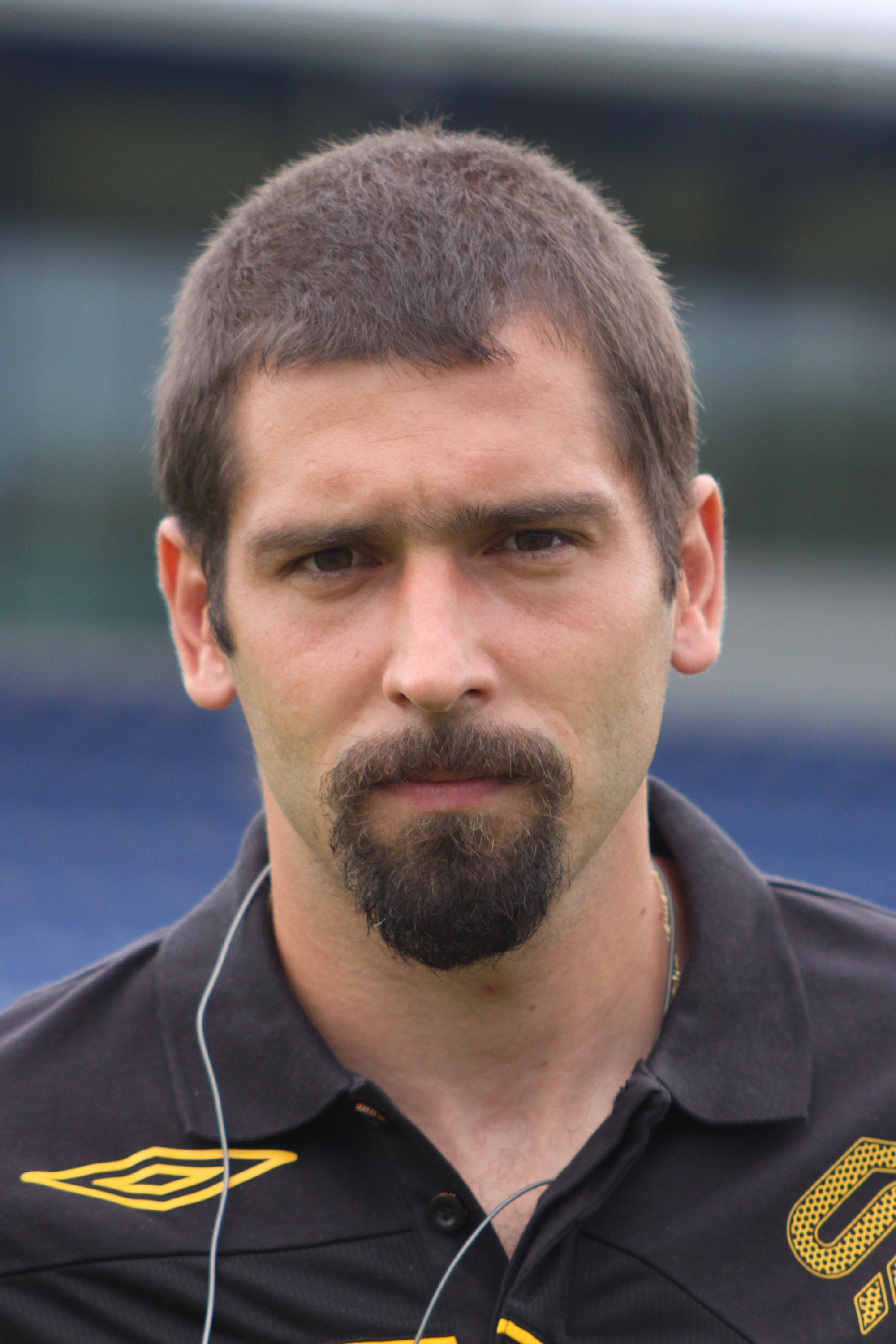

Personal information
- Date of birth: 17 July 1978 (age 48)
- Place of birth: Prague, Czechoslovakia
- Height: 1.86 m (6 ft 1 in)
- Position: Defender

Senior career*
Years	Team	Apps	(Gls)
2001	Jablonec	2	(0)
2001–2004	AS Pardubice		
2004–2006	Slovácko	48	(5)
2006–2008	Brno	71	(6)
2008–2012	Jablonec	114	(10)
2012–2013	1. SK Prostějov	?	(?)
2013–2017	SK Zápy	?	(?)
2017–2018	Meteor Prague	?	(?)
2018–2019	Sparta Kolín	?	(?)
- * Club domestic league appearances and goals

Petr Pavlík (born 17 July 1978) is a Czech former football player who was once captain of FK Jablonec. He played for amateur club Meteor Prague.
