= SK Strakonice 1908 =

Strakonice
- Full name: SK Strakonice 1908
- Founded: 1908
- Dissolved: 2014
- Final season 2013–14: 18th in Bohemian Football League
Home colours

SK Strakonice 1908 was a Czech football club located in Strakonice. Before the 2012–13 season, the club most recently competed in the third tier in the 2005–06 season.

From 2011, Strakonice was a farm team for Czech First League side SK Dynamo České Budějovice.
