= SK Kladno =

- Full name: SK Kladno, z. s.
- Nickname: Oceláři (Steelers) Modrobílí (Bluewhites)
- Founded: 1903 as Sportovní kroužek Kladno
- Ground: Stadion Františka Kloze, Kladno
- Capacity: 4,000
- Chairman: Martin Šmejkal
- Manager: Zdeněk Hašek
- League: Czech National Football League
- 2025–26: ČFL, 2nd (promoted)
- Website: www.skkladno.cz
Home colours	Away colours	Third colours

Sportovní klub Kladno, commonly known as SK Kladno, is a football club from Kladno, Czech Republic. It plays in the Bohemian Football League (third tier of the Czech football system). The club was founded on 15 February 1903. The team plays at the Stadion Františka Kloze, named after legendary player of this club František Kloz. At the time of the Czechoslovak First League, SK Kladno has spent most of its history in the top division, but from 2011, it plays in amateur tiers.

== History ==
On 15 February 1903, a group of young men sitting in the former "U Českého dvora" Hotel in Kladno decided to establish their own sports club, at which they "cultivated" the new game of the time – football. On that day, the chapters of the rich history of Kladno football began to be written. The first team played under the name of the Kladno Sports Club (Sportovní klub Kladno) in 1905. It soon achieved a strong position among the Czech rural teams and also achieved good results in matches with the high quality Prague clubs. The first championship encounter took place in Kladno as early as 1908 when AFK Kolín was defeated to the tune of 5–1. The Kladno team played continually in the highest football competition between 1925 and 1947 before being expelled from the league in the 1946/47 season for the manipulation of results. The club later returned to the top flight several times, specifically in 1948–1949, 1952–1958 and 1960–1965. The club's last premier league season for almost four decades was in 1969–70. The waiting for promotion to the top flight was until 2006. In the statistics for the highest Czechoslovak club competition (1925–1993) SK Kladno ranks 8th among the Czech clubs. The club played a total of 618 matches, acquired 558 points and had a goal difference of 1189–1398 in the highest league competition. Ever since 1907 when Slovan Wien left Kladno with a 1–8 defeat, Kladno has maintained international sports relations. As early as 1908, the well-known English team Crystal Palace F.C. played in Kladno and over the years SK Kladno has encountered teams from 34 countries in four continents (Europe, Asia, Africa and America). The most frequent international opponents have been European teams, in particular those from Norway, France, Germany and Austria. Throughout the period of its existence, SK Kladno has also participated in a number of significant football tournaments. These have included the popular Mitropa Cup (1934, 1938, 1961), the 1963–64 International Football Cup and the city competition in Belgium (Brussels 1931 and Liege 1932 and 1938). In 1934, the Kladno team undertook its longest ever international trip to the US, which proved to be good promotion not only for Czechoslovakia, but also European football. In their tour, they played sides including St. Louis All-Stars.

A number of important footballers began their football in the blue and white of Kladno or wore it at some time during their careers. Among them were Otakar Škvain-Mazal (1894–1941), a pupil of SK Kladno and the author of three goals at the Antwerp Olympics in 1920 where the Czechoslovak national team made it to the final. František Kloz (1905–1945), Kladno's most popular player and most active goal scorer (592 goals in Kladno colours) and a Czechoslovak international player who, like his teammate, Josef Kusala, laid down his life with a gun in his hand during the liberation of his homeland in 1945. Karel Kolský (1914–1984), a player and coach of Czechoslovak national team. Jan Fábera (1928–1984), a player SK Kladno, who successfully trained the national team of Sudan and was active as a coach in Algeria and Iceland. From 1971 to 1972, he and Jozef Vengloš trained the Czechoslovak under-23 team, which won the European Championship. Josef Kadraba (born 1933), a Kladno striker and a player and coach for Slovan Wien, but mostly a member of the Czechoslovak national team, which surprised many by achieving the silver medal at the 1962 FIFA World Cup in Chile. Jan Suchopárek (born 1969), a Kladno pupil, a player with 61 caps in the national team. In 1996, he brought back "silver" for the second place at the Euro held in England. It should also be recalled that the legendary Czech striker and long-time player at Slavia Praha, Josef Bican (1913–2001), trained the Kladno first team in the 1962–63 season.

== Historical names ==
- 1903 — SK Kladno (full name: Sportovní kroužek Kladno)
- 1904 — SK Kladno (full name: Sportovní klub Kladno)
- 1948 — ZSJ SONP Kladno (full name: Základní sportovní jednota Spojené ocelárny národní podnik Kladno) – merged with STAK Letná
- 1949 — TJ Sokol SONP Kladno (full name: Tělovýchovná jednota Sokol Spojené ocelárny národní podnik Kladno)
- 1953 — DSO Baník Kladno (full name: Dobrovolná sportovní organizace Baník Kladno)
- 1958 — TJ SONP Kladno (full name: Tělovýchovná jednota Spojené ocelárny národní podnik Kladno)
- 1960 — TJ Baník Kladno (full name: Tělovýchovná jednota Baník Kladno)
- 1961 — TJ SONP Kladno (full name: Tělovýchovná jednota Spojené ocelárny národní podnik Kladno)
- 1977 — TJ Poldi SONP Kladno (full name: Tělovýchovná jednota Poldi Spojené ocelárny národní podnik Kladno)
- 1989 — TJ Poldi Kladno (full name: Tělovýchovná jednota Poldi Kladno)
- 1993 — FC Terrex Kladno (full name: Football Club Terrex Kladno, a.s.)
- 1994 — FC Agrox Kladno (full name: Football Club Agrox Kladno, a.s.)
- 1995 — SK Kladno (full name: Sportovní klub Kladno, a.s.) – in 2003 merged with SK Spolana Neratovice

== Players ==
=== Current squad ===
As of 19 September 2026.

Note: Flags indicate national team as defined under FIFA eligibility rules; some limited exceptions apply. Players may hold more than one non-FIFA nationality.

No.	Pos.	Nation	Player
1	GK	CZE	Filip Nalezinek (on loan from Sparta Prague)
4	MF	CZE	Jakub Chalupa (on loan from Viktoria Plzeň)
5	DF	CZE	Pavel Hrdlička
6	DF	CZE	Matyáš Jedlička
7	MF	CZE	Hynek Hruška (on loan from Slovan Liberec)
8	DF	CZE	Vojtěch Čítek
9	FW	CZE	David Jurčenko
10	FW	CZE	Tadeáš Pospíšil
11	FW	CZE	Ondřej Novotný
12	DF	BRA	Marco Túlio
13	FW	CZE	Filip Růžička (on loan from Viktoria Plzeň)
15	DF	CZE	Karel Hrubeš
17	MF	CZE	Dominik Gembický
18	FW	CZE	Jan Lacko

No.	Pos.	Nation	Player
19	MF	NGR	Sulaiman Shehu
20	DF	CZE	Radek Fojt
21	MF	CZE	Jiří Hudec
22	MF	CZE	Daniel Samek (on loan from Artis Brno)
23	FW	CZE	Enes Osmani (on loan from Sparta Prague)
24	DF	CZE	Jakub Rubeš
25	DF	CZE	Martin Toml
27	DF	CZE	Jan Kozojed
30	GK	CZE	Albert Kotlín (on loan from Jablonec)
61	GK	CZE	Daniel Spilka
—	FW	CZE	Jaroslav Vaněk
—	FW	CZE	David Kašpárek (on loan from Vlašim)
—	MF	CZE	Jakub Jeřábek
—	MF	CZE	Tomáš Smejkal

== Managers ==
- Miroslav Koubek (Jun 2002 – Jun 2007)
- Jaroslav Šilhavý (Jun 2007 – Jun 2008)
- Martin Hřídel (Jun 2008 – Apr 2010)
- Stanislav Procházka (Apr 2010 – Jun 2010)
- Stanislav Hejkal (Jun 2010 – Aug 2010)
- Miroslav Beránek (Aug 2010 – Jan 2011)
- Jaroslav Peřina (Jan 2011 – Jul 2011)
- Eduard Novák (Jul 2011 – Oct 2011)
- Zbyněk Busta (Oct 2011 – Nov 2011)
- Martin Čurda (Nov 2011 – Apr 2012)
- Daniel Drahokoupil (Apr 2012 – May 2013)
- Ivan Pihávek (Jun 2013 – Jul 2017)
- Jan Pejsa (Jul 2017 – Jun 2021)
- Dušan Binder (Jul 2021 – Feb 2022)
- Jan Procházka (Feb 2022 – Jun 2023)
- František Doudera (Jun 2023 – Nov 2023)
- Zdeněk Hašek (Nov 2023 – present)

== History in domestic competitions ==
- 1993–1995 Czech 2. Liga
- 1995–1997 Bohemian Football League
- 1997–2000 Czech Fourth Division (Divize B)
- 2000–2002 Bohemian Football League
- 2002–2003 Czech Fourth Division (Divize B)
- 2003–2006 Czech 2. Liga
- 2006–2010 Czech First League
- 2010–2011 Czech 2. Liga
- 2011–2013 Bohemian Football League
- 2013–2024 Czech Fourth Division (Divize B)
- 2024–2026 Bohemian Football League
- 2026– Czech National Football League

- Seasons spent at Level 1 of the football league system: 4
- Seasons spent at Level 2 of the football league system: 6
- Seasons spent at Level 3 of the football league system: 8
- Seasons spent at Level 4 of the football league system: 15

=== Czech Republic ===
Season	League	Placed	Pld	W	D	L	GF	GA	GD	Pts	Cup
1993–94	2. liga	14th	30	7	7	16	24	45	–21	21	
1994–95	2. liga	16th	34	8	11	15	36	51	–15	41	
1995–96	3. liga	11th	34	10	8	16	34	43	–9	38	
1996–97	3. liga	17th	34	8	9	17	36	64	–28	33	Round of 64
1997–98	4. liga	7th	30	11	9	10	46	33	+13	42	Round of 64
1998–99	4. liga	3rd	30	17	7	4	61	23	+38	58	First round
1999–2000	4. liga	1st	30	21	6	3	62	18	+44	69	First round
2000–01	3. liga	6th	34	15	9	10	42	33	+9	54	Round of 64
2001–02	3. liga	18th	34	7	9	18	36	57	–21	30	Round of 32
2002–03	4. liga	3rd	30	16	7	7	65	37	+28	55	Round of 64
2003–04	2. liga	4th	30	15	5	10	47	27	+20	50	Round of 64
2004–05	2. liga	4th	28	11	10	7	37	22	+15	43	Round of 16
2005–06	2. liga	1st	30	17	6	7	45	21	+24	57	Round of 16
2006–07	1. liga	11th	30	7	10	13	23	37	–14	31	Round of 32
2007–08	1. liga	14th	30	6	9	15	31	45	–14	27	Round of 64
2008–09	1. liga	14th	30	8	7	15	21	41	–20	31	Round of 16
2009–10	1. liga	15th	30	7	4	19	24	50	–26	25	Round of 16
2010–11	2. liga	15th	30	8	7	15	42	48	–6	31	First round
2011–12	3. liga	17th	34	10	3	21	48	64	–16	33	First round
2012–13	3. liga	16th	34	11	5	18	42	51	–9	38	First round
2013–14	4. liga	7th	30	10	10	10	56	58	–2	40	Round of 32
2014–15	4. liga	5th	30	13	8	9	58	37	+21	52	First round
2015–16	4. liga	3rd	30	16	8	6	63	32	+31	58	First round
2016–17	4. liga	5th	30	14	6	10	54	43	+11	52	First round
2017–18	4. liga	9th	30	12	4 / 2	11	46	40	+6	49	Preliminary round
2018–19	4. liga	5th	30	12	5 / 4	9	39	37	+2	50	Round of 64
2019–20	4. liga	9th	16	7	0 / 1	8	31	27	+4	22	First round
2020–21	4. liga	4th	8	5	0 / 1	2	15	12	+3	16	First round
2021–22	4. liga	4th	30	16	8	6	61	37	+24	56	First round
2022–23	4. liga	3rd	30	17	6	7	77	35	+42	57	First round
2023–24	4. liga	2nd	30	21	4	5	82	23	+59	67	Round of 32
2024–25	3. liga	2nd	32	20	6	6	64	34	+30	66	Round of 64
2025–26	3. liga	2nd	32	22	6	4	84	26	+58	72	Round of 64

== History in European competitions ==
Season	Competition	Round	Country	Club	Home	Away
1934	Mitropa Cup	1st Round	(Italy)	Inter Milano	1–1	3–2
		Quarterfinals	(Hungary)	Ferencvárosi TC	4–1	0–6
1938	Mitropa Cup	1st Round	(Socialist Federal Republic of Yugoslavia)	HAŠK Zagreb	3–1	1–2
		Quarterfinals	(Italy)	Juventus FC	1–2	2–4
1961	Mitropa Cup	1st Round	(Italy)	Udinese Calcio		2–3 a.e.t.
			(Austria)	1. Wiener Neustädter SC		5–0
			(Austria)	Linzer ASK	1–1	
		Semifinals	(Italy)	Bologna FC	1–2	0–1
1963–64	Rappan Cup	1st Round	(Poland)	Odra Opole	1–1	0–4
			(Socialist Federal Republic of Yugoslavia)	Hajduk Split	2–0	2–1
			(East Germany)	Motor Zwickau	2–1	0–1

== Honours ==
- First League
  - 3rd place: 1933–34, 1946–47
- Second League
  - Champions: 1925, 1947–48, 1951, 1959–60, 2005–06
  - Runners-up: (promotion) 1968–69
- Bohemian Football League
  - Runners-up: (promotion) 2025–26
- Czech Fourth Division
  - Runners-up: (promotion) 2023–24
- Czech Cup
  - Runners-up: 1975–76
