= 2007–08 Czech First League =

15th season of top-tier football league in Czech Republic

Czech First League
- Season: 2007–08
- Champions: Slavia Prague
- Relegated: Bohemians 1905; Most
- Champions League: Slavia Prague; Sparta Prague
- UEFA Cup: Baník Ostrava; Liberec (via Domestic Cup)
- Intertoto Cup: Teplice
- Matches: 240
- Goals: 556 (2.32 per match)
- Top goalscorer: Václav Svěrkoš (15)
- Biggest home win: Slavia Prague 7–1 Zlín
- Biggest away win: Most 0–5 Sparta Prague
- Highest scoring: Slavia Prague 7–1 Zlín; Plzeň 6–2 Most
- Highest attendance: 20,698; Slavia Prague 2–2 Jablonec (17 May 2008)
- Lowest attendance: 1,050; Jablonec 1–0 Teplice (9 December 2007)
- Average attendance: 5,156

The 2007–08 Czech First League, known as the Gambrinus liga for sponsorship reasons, was the fifteenth season of Czech Republic's top-tier of football. The season started on 4 August 2007 and concluded on 17 May 2008.

== Teams ==
Příbram and Slovácko were relegated to the second division after finishing last and second to last, respectively, in the 2006–07 season.

Viktoria Žižkov (as champions) and Bohemians 1905 (as runners-up) were promoted from the second division.

=== Stadia and locations ===
Location of clubs in the 2007–08 Czech First League

Club	Location	Stadium	Capacity
SK Slavia Prague	Prague	Stadion Evžena Rošického	19,032
AC Sparta Prague	Prague	AXA Arena	20,374
FK Teplice	Teplice	Na Stínadlech	18,221
FC Baník Ostrava	Ostrava	Bazaly	17,372
1. FC Brno	Brno	Městský fotbalový stadion Srbská	12,550
SK Sigma Olomouc	Olomouc	Andrův stadion	12,014
FC Slovan Liberec	Liberec	Stadion U Nisy	9,900
FC Viktoria Plzeň	Plzeň	Struncovy Sady Stadion	7,842
FK SIAD Most	Most	Fotbalový stadion Josefa Masopusta	7,500
FC Bohemians 1905	Prague	Ďolíček Stadion	6,836
SK Dynamo České Budějovice	České Budějovice	E-On Stadion	6,746
FC Tescoma Zlín	Zlín	Letná Stadion	6,375
FK Jablonec 97	Jablonec nad Nisou	Stadion Střelnice	6,280
FK Viktoria Žižkov	Prague	FK Viktoria Stadion	5,600
FK Mladá Boleslav	Mladá Boleslav	Městský Stadion	5,000
SK Kladno	Kladno	Stadion Františka Kloze	4,000

=== Managerial changes ===
Team	Outgoing manager	Manner of departure	Date of vacancy	Incoming manager	Date of appointment
České Budějovice	(Czech Republic) František Cipro	Mutual consent	29 August 2007	(Czech Republic) František Straka	30 August 2007
Mladá Boleslav	(Czech Republic) Luděk Zajíc	Sacked	4 September 2007	(Czech Republic) Zdeněk Ščasný	4 September 2007
Slovan Liberec	(Czech Republic) Michal Zach	Sacked	7 October 2007	(Czech Republic) Ladislav Škorpil	15 October 2007
Jablonec 97	(Czech Republic) Luboš Kozel	Sacked	8 October 2007	(Czech Republic) František Komňacký	11 October 2007
Bohemians 1905	(Czech Republic) Zbyněk Busta	Resigned	10 April 2008	(Czech Republic) Pavel Hoftych	30 May 2008
Sparta Prague	(Czech Republic) Michal Bílek	Resigned	11 May 2008	(Czech Republic) Vítězslav Lavička	4 June 2008

- ^1 Bohemians 1905 appointed assistant manager Michal Zach to the position of caretaker manager for the six remaining matches of the season. Following the end of the season, Pavel Hoftych took over.
- ^2 Sparta Prague appointed club president Jozef Chovanec to the position of caretaker manager for the two remaining matches of the season. Following the end of the season, Vítězslav Lavička took over.

== League table ==
Pos	Team	Pld	W	D	L	GF	GA	GD	Pts	Qualification or relegation
1	Slavia Prague (C)	30	17	9	4	45	24	+21	60	Qualification for Champions League third qualifying round
2	Sparta Prague	30	17	6	7	53	26	+27	57	Qualification for Champions League second qualifying round
3	Baník Ostrava	30	15	10	5	51	28	+23	55 (Note: Baník Ostrava ahead of Brno on head-to-head record; Baník Ostrava–Brno 2–1, Brno–Baník Ostrava 0–0.)	Qualification for UEFA Cup first round
4	Brno	30	16	7	7	43	32	+11	55	
5	Teplice	30	16	5	9	40	27	+13	53	Qualification for Intertoto Cup second round
6	Slovan Liberec	30	12	8	10	35	31	+4	44	Qualification for UEFA Cup second qualifying round (Note: Slovan Liberec were qualified for the 2008–09 UEFA Cup as runners-up of the 2007–08 Czech Cup.)
7	Mladá Boleslav	30	11	9	10	37	36	+1	42	
8	Tescoma Zlín	30	10	8	12	28	31	−3	38 (Note: Tescoma Zlín ahead of Viktoria Plzeň on head-to-head record; Tescoma Zlín–Viktoria Plzeň 3–1, Viktoria Plzeň–Tescoma Zlín 1–1.)	
9	Viktoria Plzeň	30	10	8	12	32	37	−5	38	
10	Viktoria Žižkov	30	10	7	13	35	48	−13	37	
11	Sigma Olomouc	30	8	12	10	20	26	−6	36	
12	Jablonec	30	8	9	13	24	32	−8	33	
13	Dynamo České Budějovice	30	8	8	14	27	35	−8	32	
14	Kladno	30	6	9	15	31	45	−14	27	
15	Bohemians 1905 (R)	30	5	11	14	24	40	−16	26	Relegation to Czech 2. Liga
16	Most (R)	30	4	8	18	31	58	−27	20	Relegation to Czech 2. Liga

Source: Fortuna liga
Rules for classification: 1) points; 2) head-to-head points; 3) head-to-head goal difference; 4) head-to-head goals scored; 5) goal difference; 6) number of goals scored.
(C) Champions; (R) Relegated

== Results ==
Home \ Away	OST	B05	BRN	ČBU	JAB	KLA	MLA	MOS	SIG	SLA	LIB	SPA	TEP	ZLI	VPL	VŽI
Baník Ostrava		2–0	2–1	2–0	3–0	4–1	3–3	5–2	0–1	2–2	3–1	0–0	0–0	2–1	2–0	3–0
Bohemians 1905	0–2		3–1	0–2	1–1	1–1	1–1	1–0	0–0	2–0	1–0	0–0	0–2	1–2	2–2	2–2
Brno	0–0	2–0		2–1	2–1	0–0	0–3	2–1	1–0	2–1	2–0	4–2	2–2	0–0	0–1	3–1
Dynamo České Budějovice	3–0	2–0	0–2		0–0	0–0	2–2	1–0	2–0	1–2	2–0	1–1	1–0	1–0	1–1	1–1
Jablonec	1–1	0–0	2–0	1–0		1–0	1–1	1–0	2–0	0–1	1–2	0–2	1–0	0–3	0–1	3–0
Kladno	3–0	2–1	1–2	5–1	1–1		0–1	1–1	1–0	0–1	1–3	0–1	0–2	2–2	1–2	3–2
Mladá Boleslav	3–1	2–0	1–3	2–1	1–1	2–1		1–1	1–1	0–2	0–2	1–4	1–1	0–1	3–0	0–1
Most	0–2	2–4	2–2	3–1	2–1	2–2	2–1		1–1	2–3	0–1	0–5	2–3	0–1	1–1	1–0
Sigma Olomouc	1–0	1–1	1–1	1–0	1–1	1–1	1–0	2–2		1–3	1–0	0–0	1–0	0–1	1–0	2–0
Slavia Prague	0–0	2–1	1–0	1–0	2–2	2–0	1–1	2–0	0–0		1–0	1–1	1–0	7–1	3–0	0–3
Slovan Liberec	1–1	0–0	1–1	0–0	2–1	1–1	1–2	2–1	2–1	1–1		4–3	4–0	0–1	2–0	2–2
Sparta Prague	1–2	3–1	0–2	1–0	1–0	4–1	0–1	3–0	1–0	0–2	1–0		1–0	2–1	3–1	6–1
Teplice	1–1	2–0	0–1	4–2	1–0	1–0	1–2	1–0	1–1	3–1	2–0	2–1		2–1	1–0	4–1
Tescoma Zlín	2–2	0–0	0–1	1–0	0–1	4–0	0–1	1–1	0–0	0–1	0–1	0–2	1–0		3–1	0–0
Viktoria Plzeň	0–4	2–0	2–0	1–1	2–0	1–2	2–0	6–2	2–0	0–0	0–1	0–0	0–2	1–1		3–1
Viktoria Žižkov	0–2	2–1	3–4	2–0	2–0	1–0	1–0	1–0	2–0	1–1	1–1	1–4	1–2	2–0	0–0	

Source: Fortuna liga
Legend: Blue = home team win; Yellow = draw; Red = away team win.

== Top goalscorers ==
Rank	Player	Club	Goals
1	(Czech Republic) Václav Svěrkoš	Baník Ostrava	15
2	(Czech Republic) Miroslav Slepička	Sparta Prague	12
3	(Czech Republic) Jan Rajnoch	Mladá Boleslav	11
3	(North Macedonia) Goce Toleski	Slavia Prague / Most	11
5	(Czech Republic) Lukáš Magera	Baník Ostrava	9
6	(Czech Republic) Libor Došek	Sparta Prague	8
6	(Slovakia) Róbert Zeher	Baník Ostrava	8
6	(Czech Republic) Libor Žůrek	Tescoma Zlín	8
9	(Czech Republic) Aleš Besta	Brno	7
9	(Czech Republic) Martin Fenin*	Teplice	7
9	(Czech Republic) Stanislav Vlček*	Slavia Prague	7

- *play abroad after winter transfer

== Czech teams in European competitions ==
- Sparta Prague – UEFA Champions League (eliminated in third qualifying round) & UEFA Cup (eliminated in group stage)
- Slavia Prague – UEFA Champions League (eliminated in group stage) & UEFA Cup (round of 32)
- FK Mladá Boleslav – UEFA Cup (eliminated in group stage)
- FK Jablonec 97 – UEFA Cup (eliminated in second qualifying round)
- Slovan Liberec – UEFA Intertoto Cup (eliminated in second round)

== Attendances ==
Rank	Club	Average	Highest
1	Baník Ostrava	11,022	17,372
2	Sparta Praha	9,378	20,565
3	Bohemians	6,627	7,500
4	Slavia Praha	6,457	20,698
5	Slovan Liberec	5,185	7,615
6	Teplice	5,070	14,700
7	Brno	4,968	9,550
8	Sigma Olomouc	4,846	11,085
9	Mladá Boleslav	4,125	5,000
10	Baník Most	4,104	7,500
11	Viktoria Plzeň	3,828	7,887
12	Jablonec	3,707	6,105
13	Viktoria Žižkov	3,649	5,540
14	České Budějovice	3,484	5,978
15	Zlín	3,457	6,058
16	Kladno	2,446	4,000

== See also ==
- 2007–08 Czech Cup
- 2007–08 Czech 2. Liga
