= FK Bohemians Prague (Střížkov) =

Bohemians Prague
- Full name: Fotbalový klub Bohemians Praha
- Nickname: Střížkov
- Founded: 1996
- Dissolved: 2016 (men's team); 2017 (women's team became FC Praha)
- Ground: Stadion SK Prosek; Lovosická 559; Prague 9 – Letňany
- Capacity: 920
- Chairman: Karel Kapr
- Final season 2015–16: 2nd in Prague Championship
- Website: www.bohemiansfc.cz
Home colours	Away colours

FK Bohemians Prague (Czech: FK Bohemians Praha), formerly known as FC Střížkov Praha 9, was a football club from Střížkov, Prague, Czech Republic. The club played two seasons in the Czech First League, attracting controversy for refusing to play a fixture and ultimately receiving a 15-point deduction from the league, coinciding with their relegation.

The club won the Bohemian Football League in the 2006–07 season and the Second League the subsequent season, reaching the First League in 2008, In 2010 the club was relegated from Czech First League. In 2011 the club won the Bohemian Football League again and was promoted to the Czech 2. Liga. In June 2011 the club appointed SK Strakonice 1908 coach František Barát as manager, replacing coach Jaromír Jindráček.

After losing the battle over the naming rights, their owner Karel Kapr decided to disband the men's side of the club. Most of the players were transferred to SK Třeboradice. The club decided to continue with an adult women's team and junior male and female teams.

== History ==
The old name of the club was FC Střížkov Praha 9. The club bought the logo of the traditional team Bohemians Prague in 2005 after the old Bohemians Prague were relegated from the Second League to the Bohemian Football League. In 2010 the Prague City Court ruled that the club cannot use the name Bohemians, as it has no connection with traditional Bohemians Prague.

In 2010, Bohemians were deducted 20 points and fined 6 million CZK because they refused to play a league fixture against Bohemians 1905 and accused SK Sigma Olomouc of bribery without presenting evidence and the club was relegated from the Czech First League. In June 2010 the club was not given a license by the football association to play in the Second League as the club's officials refused to pay their fine, thus it was automatically relegated to the Bohemian Football League (third-level league). The following season, 2010–2011, the club won the Bohemian Football League and returned to professional football in the Czech 2. Liga.

In September 2012 a Czech court ruled that the club must not continue to use the name Bohemians after 31 January 2013. However, in December 2012, the club was granted the right to appeal against the decision, thus protracting the process yet further.

The club was relegated to the third-tier football league, the Bohemian Football League, in 2014 after finishing 15th in the National Football League. They won the division in their first season, but refused the promotion back to the National Football League. On 23 June 2015, the club announced that their leadership had decided to enter the 5th division of Czech football pyramid for the 2015–16 season.

== Relation to Bohemians 1905 ==
In 1993, Bohemians 1905 broke away from the TJ Bohemians Praha sports franchise and became a separate legal entity. The club functioned normally until financial troubles came up and the club nearly collapsed in 2005. TJ Bohemians took advantage of the situation and rented out the Bohemians logo to FC Střížkov Praha 9, a lowly team in the third tier of Czech football. TJ were able to pour money into the small club and help them rise to the first division. However, fans remained loyal to the Bohemians 1905 team, and helped the large club to recover.

== Stadium ==
In the 2008–09 Czech First League, Bohemians played its home matches at FK Viktoria Stadion, due to its own stadium in Horní Počernice not meeting league standards.

In the 2009–10 Czech First League, Bohemians was forced to move again due to the league's requirements for under-soil heating and played its home matches at Stadion Evžena Rošického.

In the 2011–12 Czech 2. Liga, after reconstruction work on the ground, Bohemians returned to their home stadium in Střížkov.

== Managers ==
- Luboš Urban (2005–06)
- Radim Nečas (2006)
- Luboš Urban (2006–09)
- Robert Žák (2009)
- Jaromír Jindráček (2009–11)
- František Barát (2011–12)
- Jaromír Jindráček (2012)
- Ivan Pihávek (2012–2013)
- Miloš Sazima (2013–2016)

== History in domestic competitions ==
- 2004–2007 Bohemian Football League
- 2007–2008 Czech 2. Liga
- 2008–2010 Czech First League
- 2010–2011 Bohemian Football League
- 2011–2014 Czech 2. Liga
- 2014–2015 Bohemian Football League
- 2015–2016 Prague Championship

- Seasons spent at Level 1 of the football league system: 2
- Seasons spent at Level 2 of the football league system: 4
- Seasons spent at Level 3 of the football league system: 5
- Seasons spent at Level 4 of the football league system: 0

=== Czech Republic ===
Season	League	Placed	Pld	W	D	L	GF	GA	GD	Pts	Cup
2004–2005	3. liga	10th	32	11	8	13	36	43	–7	41	First Round
2005–2006	3. liga	3rd	34	19	6	9	58	26	+32	63	Round of 64
2006–2007	3. liga	1st	34	21	8	5	69	26	+43	71	Round of 32
2007–2008	2. liga	1st	30	15	8	7	46	38	+8	53	Semifinals
2008–2009	1. liga	13th	30	10	4	16	33	46	–13	34	Round of 16
2009–2010	1. liga	16th	30	4	4	22	27	65	–38	1 (Note: 15 points deducted.)	Round of 32
2010–2011	3. liga	1st	34	26	2	6	87	34	+53	80	–
2011–2012	2. liga	5th	30	14	6	10	43	31	+12	48	First Round
2012–2013	2. liga	11th	30	6	17	7	30	33	–3	35	Round of 32
2013–2014	2. liga	15th	30	6	4	20	30	66	–36	22	First Round
2014–2015	3. liga	1st	34	25	5	4	67	23	+44	83	Round of 32
2015–2016	Prague Championship	2nd	30	17	7	6	69	44	+25	58	Did not enter

== Honours ==
- Czech 2. Liga (second tier)
  - Champions: 2007–08
- Bohemian Football League (third tier)
  - Champions: 2006–07, 2010–11
