= 2017–18 Czech Cup =

MOL Cup

Tournament details
- Country: Czech Republic
- Teams: 141

Final positions
- Champions: Slavia Prague (4th title)
- Runners-up: Jablonec

The 2017–18 Czech Cup, known as the MOL Cup for sponsorship reasons, was the 25th season of the annual knockout football tournament of the Czech Republic. It began with the preliminary round in July 2017 and is due to end with the final in May 2018. The winner of the cup will gain the right to play in the group stage of the 2018–19 UEFA Europa League.

== Teams ==
Round	Clubs remaining	Clubs involved	Winners from previous round	New entries this round	Leagues entering at this round
Preliminary round	141	78	none	78	Levels 4 and 5 in football league pyramid
First round	102	86	39	47	Czech 2. Liga; Bohemian Football League; Moravian–Silesian Football League
Second round	59	54	43	11	Czech First League – teams not playing in UEFA competitions
Third round	32	32	27	5	Czech First League – teams entered into UEFA competitions
Fourth round	16	16	16	none	none
Quarter-finals	8	8	8	none	none
Semi-finals	4	4	4	none	none
Final	2	2	2	none	none

== Preliminary round ==
The preliminary round ties were played from 13 – 16 July 2017. 78 teams competed in this round, all from level 4 or below of the Czech league system, as well as two teams from the third tier of Czech football. All time listed are CEST.

13 July 2017	Slovan Havlíčkův Brod (4)	0–1	Slavoj Polná (4)	Havlíčkův Brod
17:00			Urbánek 67'	Stadium: Fotbalový areál Na Losích

15 July 2017	Přeštice (4)	1–6	1. FC Karlovy Vary (4)	Přeštice
10:15	Besta 79'		Geňo 16'; Kalina 57'; Psohlavec 62', 73', 89'; Maňák 87'

15 July 2017	Hořovicko (4)	1–0	Rakovník (4)	Hořovice
14:30	O. Bělohlávek 87'

15 July 2017	Spartak Slatiňany (5)	3–1	OEZ Letohrad (4)	Slatiňany
17:00	T. Koudelka 59'; J. Kopecký 63'; L. Rešetář 82'		R. Macek 66'

15 July 2017	Arsenal Česká Lípa (4)	1–3	Kolín (4)	Česká Lípa
17:00	K. Karel 50'		Janecký J. 12', 63'; M. Puk 29'

15 July 2017	Nový Bor (4)	1–5	Turnov (4)	Nový Bor
17:00	P. Stromecký 29'		M. Petrlák 2', 67'; V. Tvrdý 46'; J. Šimek 49'; M. Horák 59'

15 July 2017	Tatran Ždírec (4)	3–0	Vrchovina (4)	Ždírec
17:00	P. Novotný 1'; P. Klimeš 15'; M. Najman 48'

15 July 2017	Sokol Tasovice (4)	2–1	Břeclav (4)	Tasovice
17:00	R. Švarc 22'; R. Hrobař 55'		P. Musil 13'

15 July 2017	Lokomotiva Petrovice (4)	1–3 (a.e.t.)	Havířov (4)	Petrovice u Karviné
17:00	J. Paduch 78'		L. Skoupý 45'; B. Förster 105'; M. Matušovič 114'

15 July 2017	Frýdlant nad Ostravicí (4)	0–0 (a.e.t.) (2–4 p)	Nový Jičín (4)	Frýdlant nad Ostravicí
17:30

16 July 2017	Sokol Ústí (4)	3–0	Nové Sady (4)	Hranice
10:00	V. Smolka 28'; P. Zagol 54'; T. Orava 68'

16 July 2017	Střešovice 1911 (6)	1–3	Baník Souš (4)	Prague
17:00	D. Vokurka 42'		J. Zápotocký 13' (pen.); V. Popelka 37'; T. Karlovec 85'

16 July 2017	Komárov (6)	1–2	Viktoria Mariánské Lázně (4)	Komárov
17:00	M. Pužík 68'		M. Kravař 32'; V. Kafka 75'

16 July 2017	Nová Včelnice (5)	0–1	Malše Roudné (4)	Nová Včelnice
17:00			J. Píša 8'

16 July 2017	Nejdek (5)	1–3	Chomutov (4)	Nejdek
17:00	T. Pilař 70'		B. Martin 18', 59', 83'

16 July 2017	Seko Louny (4)	4–1	Motorlet Prague (4)	Louny
17:00	J. Suchý 73', 85'; V. Trup 82'; M. Lesniak 90'		J. Sodoma 44'

16 July 2017	Doksy (5)	0–2	Ostrá (4)	Doksy
17:00			P. Vobořil 54'; J. Petlička 89'

16 July 2017	Červený Kostelec (5)	0–0 (a.e.t.) (5–4 p)	Dvůr Králové nad Labem (4)	Červený Kostelec
17:00

16 July 2017	Čechie Vykáň (4)	2–1	Spartak Chrastava (4)	Vykáň
17:00	J. David 39' (pen.), 66'		L. Čurgali 68' (pen.)

16 July 2017	Brná (5)	2–9	Zbuzany (4)	Ústí nad Labem
17:00	J. Králík 32'; M. Semetana 71'		M. Kincl 6'; M. Lička 16', 27', 30', 37', 58', 81'; R. Barciaga 42'; J. Brodský 90'

16 July 2017	Spartak Soběslav (4)	1–3	Tatran Sedlčany (4)	Soběslav
17:00	M. Dvořák 54'		D. Němec 6', 52'; M. Sirotek 12'

16 July 2017	Petřín Plzeň (4)	1–2	Klatovy 1898 (4)	Plzeň
17:00	P. Bednář 36'		F. Diviš 40'; J. Szedmák 86'

16 July 2017	Brandýs nad Labem (4)	0–5	Vysoké Mýto (4)	Brandýs nad Labem
17:00			P. Štěpánek 15', 56', 62', 89'; A. Kopřiva 30'

16 July 2017	Hrobce (4)	3–1	Tatran Rako Rakovník (4)	Hrobce
17:00	M. Polák 68', 82'		V. Hradecký 38'; L. Černý 63' (o.g.)

16 July 2017	Jiskra Mšeno - Jablonec n. N. (4)	3–2	Kratonohy (4)	Jablonec nad Nisou
17:00	M. Štemberk 21'; O. Rozkovec 23', 27'		B. David 80'; O. Karanský 82'

16 July 2017	Aritma Prague (4)	0–2	Čáslav (4)	Prague
17:00			J. Jícha 17'; D. Dastych 32'

16 July 2017	Dobříš (4)	5–2	Kladno (4)	Dobříš
17:00	F. Dort 18'; P. Junek 26', 51'; Š. Maryška 44'; J. Karas 85'		F. Suchý 29'; Š. Hanzlíl 88'

16 July 2017	Neratovice–Byškovice (4)	2–1	Admira Prague (4)	Neratovice
17:00	A. Ďurinda 24'; J. Moravec 69'		R. Šulc 71'

16 July 2017	Trutnov (4)	0–2	Sokol Živanice (4)	Trutnov
17:00			R. Gorol 71'; D. Petrus 89'

16 July 2017	Sokol Provodov (5)	2–2 (a.e.t.) (4–5 p)	TVD Slavičín (4)	Provodov
17:00	M. Huťka 36'. T. Ulman 52'		P. Elšík 15'; P. Kříž 15'
	Penalties
			A. Bartos (penalty scored)

16 July 2017	Bospor Bohumín (4)	4–2	Dolní Benešov (4)	Bohumín
17:00	L. Poštulka 9'; D. Jatagandzidis 47'; M. Opic 57'; F. Hanus 77' (o.g.)		T. Moravec 5' (o.g.); J. Oberherr 62'

16 July 2017	Tišnov (4)	5–4 (a.e.t.)	Slovan Rosice (4)	Tišnov
17:00	F. Kudlan 27', 87', 102', 118'; D. Duda 89'		O. Přichystal 12', 45'; T. Selinger 40'; P. Drbal 95'

16 July 2017	Strání (4)	2–1	Slovan Bzenec (4)	Strání
17:00	R. Bihári 76'; L. Jaroněk 78'		T. Reška 18'

16 July 2017	Vsetín (4)	1–2	Elseremo Brumov (4)	Vsetín
17:00	J. Kapusta 38'		P. Naňák 23'; M. Novák 70'

16 July 2017	Hranice (4)	1–2	Kozlovice (4)	Hranice
17:00	R. Kundrát 89' (pen.)		J. Šolín 30'; L. Kaďorek 88'

16 July 2017	Spartak Velká Bíteš (4)	3–1	Blansko (4)	Velká Bíteš
17:00	J. Pohl 7'; J. Chlup 47', 79'		D. Šmerda 26'

16 July 2017	Šumperk (4)	1–3	HFK Olomouc (3)	Šumperk
17:00	F. Rozsíval 11'		P. Chlopek 22'; T. Drmola 53'; L. Horka 84' (pen.)

16 July 2017	Jeseník (4)	2–2 (a.e.t.) (4–2 p)	Jiskra Rýmařov (3)	Jeseník
17:00	M. Furik 47'; P. Navrátil 55'		P. Ondruška 26'; T. Šupák 63'

16 July 2017	Třebíč (4)	0–6	Stará Říše (4)	Třebíč
17:00			A. Plichta 11', 68'; M. Kelbler 27'; M. Vacek 29'; J. Vodáček 52'; R. Nehyba 86'

== First round ==
The first round started on 18 July, with matches played between then and 23 July. 86 teams took part in this stage of the competition.

18 July 2017	Havířov (4)	3–7	Třinec (2)	Havířov
18:00	M. Lisanik 31'; T. Omasta 83'; P. Lisicky 86'		Čelůstka 5'; V. Jurena 16', 25'; Bedecs 28'; Hošek 51'; Ižvolt 73'; Reintam 82'

19 July 2017	Jeseník (4)	2–4	Opava (2)	Jeseník
17:00	P. Navrátil 27'; B. Mlynář 62'		Smola 8', 48', 52'; Kuzmanović 79'

19 July 2017	Viktoria Mariánské Lázně (4)	1–4	Viktoria Žižkov (2)	Mariánské Lázně
18:00	J. Sadilek 8'		Volek 20'; J. Bazal 26'; Stratil 81'; M. Čermák 87'

22 July 2017	Meteor Prague (4)	1–4	Vlašim (2)	Prague
10:15

22 July 2017	Spartak Slatiňany (5)	1–3	Chrudim (3)	Slatiňany
10:15

22 July 2017	Zbuzany (4)	2–3	Písek (3)	Zbuzany
10:30

22 July 2017	Tišnov (4)	3–4	Spartak Hulín (3)	Tišnov
10:30

22 July 2017	Český Brod (4)	3–4	Loko Vltavín (3)	Český Brod
17:00

22 July 2017	Slovan Velvary (4)	1–0	Dynamo České Budějovice (2)	Velvary
17:00

22 July 2017	Mohelnice (3)	0–2	Prostějov (3)	Mohelnice
17:00

22 July 2017	Seko Louny (4)	0–7	Baník Sokolov (2)	Louny
17:00

22 July 2017	Baník Souš (4)	0–3	Varnsdorf (2)	Most
17:00

22 July 2017	Čechie Vykáň (4)	0–4	Ústí nad Labem (2)	Vykáň
17:00

22 July 2017	Klatovy 1898 (4)	1–4	Jiskra Domažlice (3)	Klatovy
17:00

22 July 2017	Jiskra Mšeno - Jablonec n. N. (4)	4–2	Dobrovice (3)	Jablonec nad Nisou
17:00

22 July 2017	Tatran Sedlčany (4)	0–5	Táborsko (2)	Sedlčany
17:00

22 July 2017	1. FC Karlovy Vary (4)	0–3	Králův Dvůr (3)	Karlovy Vary
17:00

22 July 2017	Neratovice–Byškovice (4)	0–2	Převýšov (3)	Neratovice
17:00

22 July 2017	Čáslav (4)	1–2	Příbram (2)	Čáslav
17:00

22 July 2017	Hrobce (4)	2–3	Sokol Brozany (3)	Hrobce
17:00

22 July 2017	Sokol Živanice (4)	2–2 (a.e.t.) (5–3 p)	Olympia Prague (2)	Živanice
17:00

22 July 2017	Hořovicko (4)	1–4	Štěchovice (3)	Hořovice
17:00

22 July 2017	Malše Roudné (4)	0–5	Benešov (3)	Roudné
17:00

22 July 2017	Dobříš (4)	1–0	Litoměřicko (3)	Dobříš
17:00

22 July 2017	Turnov (4)	3–2	Benátky nad Jizerou (3)	Turnov
17:00

22 July 2017	Kolín (4)	1–3	Jiskra Ústí nad Orlicí (3)	Kolín
17:00

22 July 2017	TVD Slavičín (4)	6–0	Viktoria Otrokovice (3)	Slavičín
17:00

22 July 2017	Sokol Ústí (4)	1–2	Hlučín (3)	Hranice
17:00

22 July 2017	Slavoj Polná (4)	0–3	Znojmo (2)	Polná
17:00

22 July 2017	Bospor Bohumín (4)	0–4	Odra Petřkovice (3)	Bohumín
17:00

22 July 2017	Strání (4)	3–5	Hanácká Slavia Kroměříž (3)	Strání
17:00

22 July 2017	Elseremo Brumov (4)	0–3	Valašské Meziříčí (3)	Brumov
17:00

22 July 2017	Tatran Ždírec (4)	1–0	Velké Meziříčí (3)	Ždírec
17:00

22 July 2017	Kozlovice (4)	3–0	Uničov (3)	Přerov
17:00

22 July 2017	Nový Jičín (4)	2–3	Vítkovice (2)	Nový Jičín
17:00

22 July 2017	Spartak Velká Bíteš (4)	0–2	Vyškov (3)	Velká Bíteš
17:00

22 July 2017	HFK Olomouc (3)	2–0	Frýdek-Místek (2)	Olomouc
17:00

22 July 2017	Ostrá (4)	1–1 (a.e.t.) (2–4 p)	Zápy (3)	Ostrá
17:00

23 July 2017	Chomutov (4)	1–2	Slavoj Vyšehrad (3)	Chomutov
17:00

23 July 2017	Červený Kostelec (5)	1–7	Hradec Králové (2)	Červený Kostelec
17:00	J. Hundák 51'		Pázler 8', 13', 43'; Zorvan 31', 82', 84'; Schwarz 42'

23 July 2017	Sokol Tasovice (4)	1–4	Hodonín (3)	Tasovice
17:00

23 July 2017	Stará Říše (4)	0–3	Líšeň (3)	Stará Říše
17:00

25 July 2017	Vysoké Mýto (4)	1–2	Pardubice (2)	Vysoké Mýto
17:00

== Second round ==
54 teams participated in the second round; 11 First League teams (all other than those playing in European competitions) entered the competition at this stage, joining the 43 winners of the first round matches. The draw was made on 26 July.

2 August 2017	Slavoj Vyšehrad (3)	1–2 (a.e.t.)	Vlašim (2)	Prague
17:00

5 August 2017	Jiskra Domažlice (3)	2–0	Chrudim (3)	Domažlice
16:00

8 August 2017	Slovan Velvary (4)	0–1	Hradec Králové (2)	Velvary
17:00

8 August 2017	Odra Petřkovice (3)	1–1 (a.e.t.) (2–4 p)	Znojmo (2)	Petřkovice
17:00

8 August 2017	Hodonín (3)	1–0	Vítkovice (2)	Hodonín
17:00

8 August 2017	Hlučín (3)	1–3 (a.e.t.)	Sigma Olomouc (1)	Hlučín
17:00

8 August 2017	Turnov (4)	1–3	Ústí nad Labem (2)	Turnov
17:00

8 August 2017	Benešov (3)	1–5	Bohemians 1905 (1)	Benešov
17:30

8 August 2017	HFK Olomouc (3)	2–1	Zbrojovka Brno (1)	Olomouc
18:00

9 August 2017	Sokol Brozany (3)	0–4	Viktoria Žižkov (2)	Brozany nad Ohří
17:00

9 August 2017	Písek (3)	2–2 (a.e.t.) (5–4 p)	Pardubice (2)	Písek
17:00

9 August 2017	Králův Dvůr (3)	1–2	Táborsko (2)	Králův Dvůr
17:00

9 August 2017	Sokol Živanice (4)	1–0	Varnsdorf (2)	Živanice
17:00

9 August 2017	Štěchovice (3)	1–3	Příbram (2)	Štěchovice
17:00

9 August 2017	Dobříš (4)	0–3	Liberec (1)	Dobříš
17:00

9 August 2017	Jiskra Mšeno - Jablonec n. N. (4)	1–4	FK Jablonec (1)	Jablonec nad Nisou
17:00

9 August 2017	Zápy (3)	2–4	Baník Sokolov (2)	Zápy
17:00

9 August 2017	Převýšov (3)	0–2	Dukla Prague (1)	Převýšov
17:00

9 August 2017	Loko Vltavín (3)	2–3	Teplice (1)	Prague
17:00

9 August 2017	Jiskra Ústí nad Orlicí (3)	1–1 (a.e.t.) (4–5 p)	Slovácko (1)	Ústí nad Orlicí
17:00

9 August 2017	TVD Slavičín (4)	0–2	Karviná (1)	Slavičín
17:00

9 August 2017	Tatran Ždírec (4)	0–4	Třinec (2)	Ždírec
17:00

9 August 2017	Spartak Hulín (3)	0–5	Baník Ostrava (1)	Hulín
17:00

9 August 2017	Kozlovice (4)	0–2	Hanácká Slavia Kroměříž (3)	Přerov
17:00

9 August 2017	Valašské Meziříčí (3)	3–1	Líšeň (3)	Valašské Meziříčí
17:00

15 August 2017	Prostějov (3)	1–3	Opava (2)	Prostějov
17:00

16 August 2017	Vyškov (3)	1–4	Jihlava (1)	Vyškov
17:00

== Third round ==
32 teams participate in the third round; the final five First League teams entered the competition at this stage (holders FC Fastav Zlín, Slavia Prague, Viktoria Plzeň, Sparta Prague and Mladá Boleslav). They are joined by the 27 winners of the second round matches. The draw was made on 30 August.

19 September 2017	Táborsko (2)	3–4	Teplice (1)	Sezimovo Ústí
16:00

19 September 2017	Bohemians 1905 (1)	2–2 (a.e.t.) (3–4 p)	Vlašim (2)	Prague
18:00

20 September 2017	Sokol Živanice (4)	0–8	Sigma Olomouc (1)	Živanice
16:00

20 September 2017	Hodonín (3)	0–4 (a.e.t.)	Liberec (1)	Hodonín
16:00

20 September 2017	HFK Olomouc (3)	1–8	Hradec Králové (2)	Olomouc
16:00

20 September 2017	Jiskra Domažlice (3)	3–2	Dukla Prague (1)	Domažlice
16:00

20 September 2017	Hanácká Slavia Kroměříž (3)	0–4	Karviná (1)	Kroměříž
17:00

20 September 2017	Mladá Boleslav (1)	3–0	Příbram (2)	Mladá Boleslav
17:00

20 September 2017	Jablonec (1)	2–1	Viktoria Žižkov (2)	Jablonec nad Nisou
17:00

20 September 2017	Jihlava (1)	1–0	Baník Sokolov (2)	Jihlava
17:00

20 September 2017	Znojmo (2)	0–1	Sparta Prague (1)	Znojmo
18:15

20 September 2017	Slavia Prague (1)	5–1	Třinec (2)	Prague
18:30

27 September 2017	Valašské Meziříčí (3)	0–6	Baník Ostrava (1)	Valašské Meziříčí
16:00

4 October 2017	Písek (3)	0–2	Zlín (1)	Písek
16:00

4 October 2017	Ústí nad Labem (2)	0–2	Slovácko (1)	Ústí nad Labem
18:00

5 October 2017	Viktoria Plzeň (1)	4–1	Opava (2)	Plzeň
17:00

== Fourth round ==
The fourth round commenced on 24 October 2017.

24 October 2017	Sigma Olomouc (1)	3–4	Jablonec (1)	Olomouc
17:00				Stadium: Andrův stadion

24 October 2017	Teplice (1)	2–3	Hradec Králové (2)	Teplice
18:00				Stadium: Na Stínadlech

25 October 2017	Jiskra Domažlice (3)	2–4	Mladá Boleslav (1)	Domažlice
14:30

25 October 2017	Vlašim (2)	1–1 (a.e.t.) (3–5 p)	Zlín (1)	Vlašim
15:00				Stadium: Stadion Kollárova ulice

25 October 2017	Sparta Prague (1)	2–2 (a.e.t.) (2–4 p)	Baník Ostrava (1)	Prague
17:00				Stadium: Generali Arena

25 October 2017	Jihlava (1)	1–3	Slavia Prague (1)	Jihlava
18:00				Stadium: Stadion v Jiráskově ulici

1 November 2017	Liberec (1)	5–3 (a.e.t.)	Karviná (1)	Liberec
16:30				Stadium: Stadion u Nisy

10 November 2017	Viktoria Plzeň (1)	2–3 (a.e.t.)	Slovácko (1)	Plzeň
18:00

== Quarter-finals ==
7 March 2018	Slavia Prague (1)	2–0	Liberec (1)	Prague
17:00				Stadium: Eden Arena

7 March 2018	Jablonec (1)	3–1	Slovácko (1)	Jablonec nad Nisou
16:00				Stadium: Stadion Střelnice

14 March 2018	Mladá Boleslav (1)	1–1 (a.e.t.) (5–4 p)	Baník Ostrava (1)	Mladá Boleslav
				Stadium: Městský stadion

14 March 2018	Hradec Králové (2)	0–2	Zlín (1)	Hradec Králové
				Stadium: Všesportovní stadion

== Semi-finals ==
17 April 2018	Slavia Prague (1)	2–0	Mladá Boleslav (1)	Prague
20:00 CEST (UTC+02:00)	Hušbauer 48'; Stoch 56'	Report		Stadium: Eden Arena; Attendance: 7,326; Referee: Emanuel Marek

25 April 2018	Zlín (1)	0–1	Jablonec (1)	Zlín
		Report	Masopust 28'	Stadium: Letná Stadion; Attendance: 4,702; Referee: Radek Příhoda

== Final ==
9 May 2018	Slavia Prague (1)	3–1	Jablonec (1)	Mladá Boleslav
21:15 CEST (UTC+02:00)	Tecl 14', 39'; Stoch 90'	Report	Pernica 34'	Stadium: Městský stadion Attendance: 4,625; Referee: Miroslav Zelinka

== See also ==
- 2017–18 Czech First League
- 2017–18 Czech National Football League
