= Hrobice =

Hrobice may refer to places in the Czech Republic:

- Hrobice (Pardubice District), a municipality and village in the Pardubice Region
- Hrobice (Zlín District), a municipality and village in the Zlín Region

== See also ==
- Hrobce
- Hrobčice
