= Brumov =

- Municipality
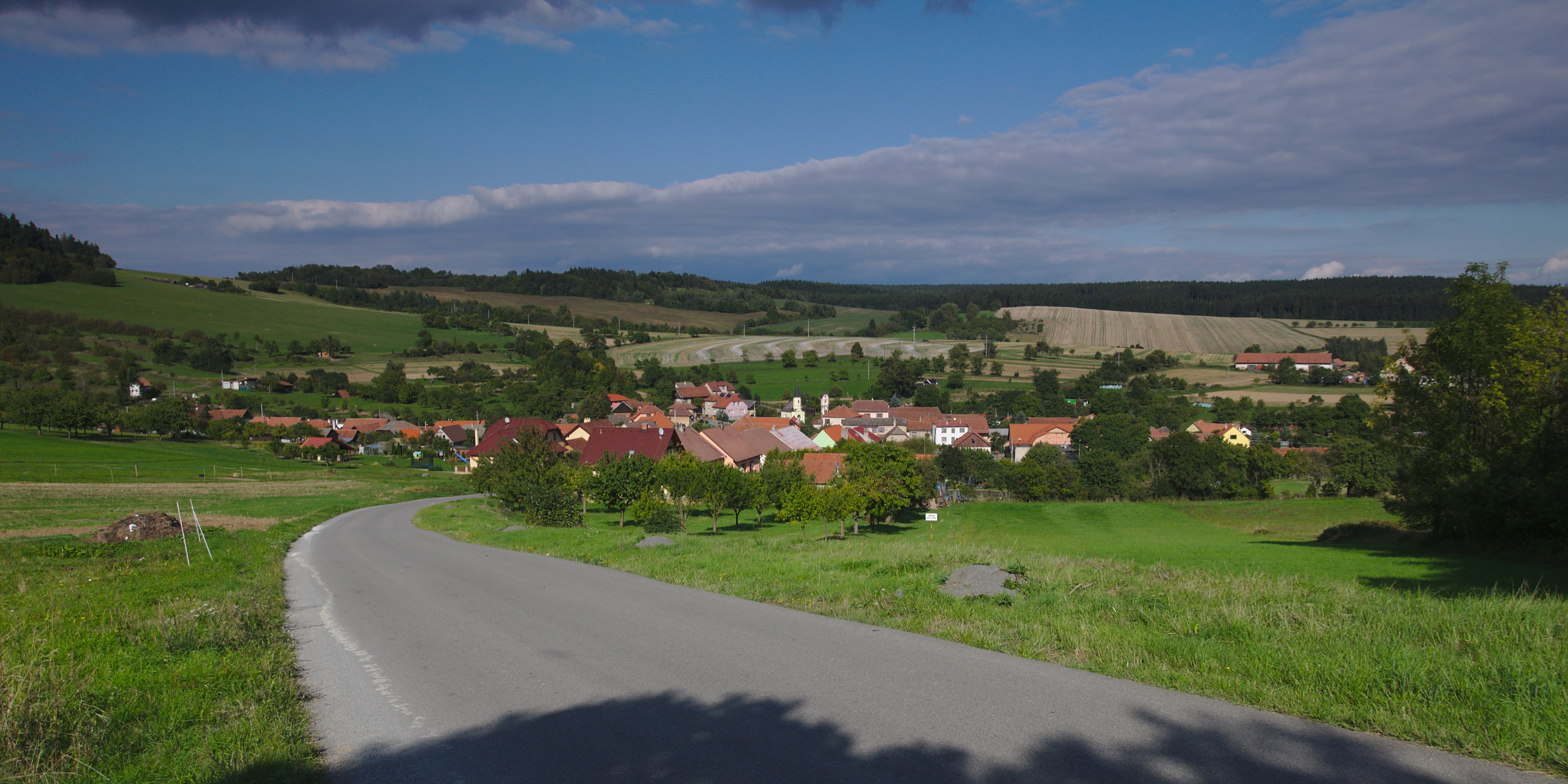
- View from the south

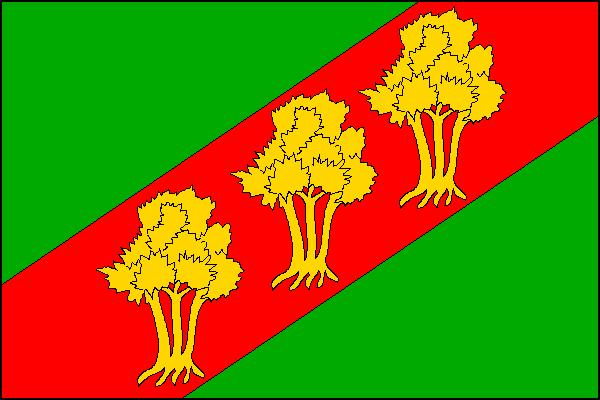
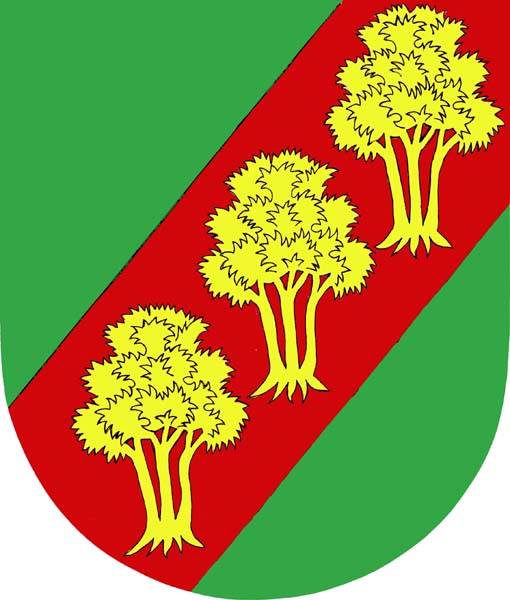
- Flag Coat of arms

- Location in the Czech Republic
- Coordinates: 49°27′45″N 16°25′33″E
- Country: Czech Republic
- Region: South Moravian
- District: Brno-Country
- First mentioned: 1390

Area
  - Total: 2.84 km^{2} (1.10 sq mi)
- Elevation: 542 m (1,778 ft)

Population (2026-01-01)
  - Total: 265
  - Density: 93.3/km^{2} (242/sq mi)
- Time zone: UTC+1 (CET)
  - Summer (DST): UTC+2 (CEST)
- Postal code: 679 23
- Website: www.obecbrumov.cz

Brumov is a municipality and village in Brno-Country District in the South Moravian Region of the Czech Republic. It has about 300 inhabitants.

Brumov lies approximately 33 kilometres (21 mi) north-west of Brno and 161 km (100 mi) south-east of Prague.

== Demographics ==
Historical population
Year	Pop.	±%
1869	325	—
1880	316	−2.8%
1890	313	−0.9%
1900	302	−3.5%
1910	296	−2.0%
1921	290	−2.0%
1930	310	+6.9%
1950	267	−13.9%
1961	294	+10.1%
1970	300	+2.0%
1980	270	−10.0%
1991	249	−7.8%
2001	236	−5.2%
2011	241	+2.1%
2021	250	+3.7%
Source: Censuses
