= Živanice =

- Municipality
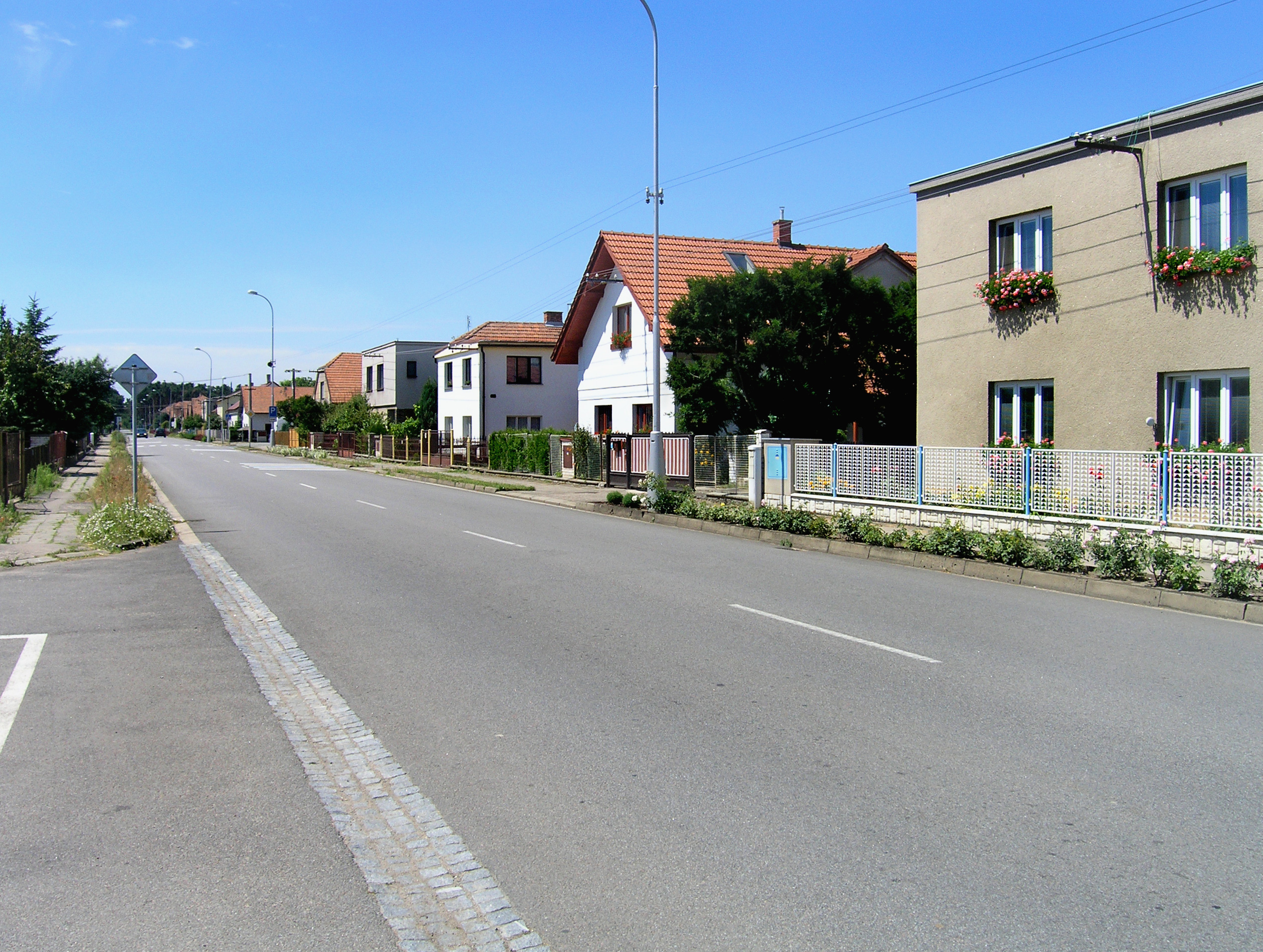
- Main street

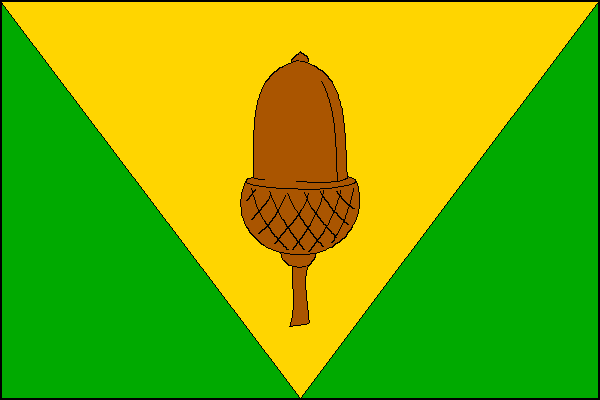
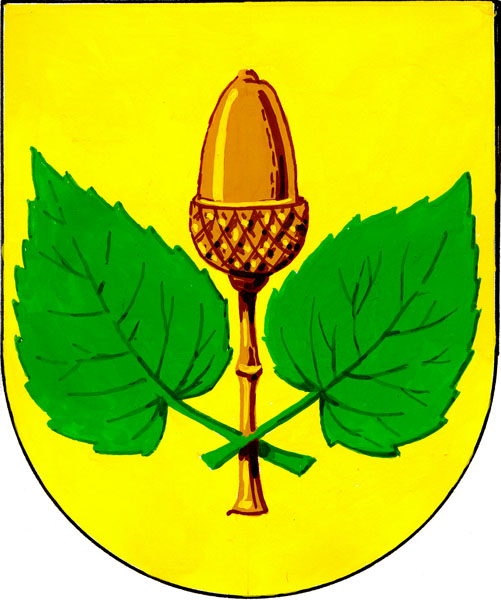
- Flag Coat of arms

- Location in the Czech Republic
- Coordinates: 50°3′42″N 15°38′58″E
- Country: Czech Republic
- Region: Pardubice
- District: Pardubice
- First mentioned: 1226

Area
  - Total: 8.05 km^{2} (3.11 sq mi)
- Elevation: 217 m (712 ft)

Population (2026-01-01)
  - Total: 1,016
  - Density: 126/km^{2} (327/sq mi)
- Time zone: UTC+1 (CET)
  - Summer (DST): UTC+2 (CEST)
- Postal code: 533 42
- Website: www.zivanice.cz

Živanice is a municipality and village in Pardubice District in the Pardubice Region of the Czech Republic. It has about 1,000 inhabitants.

== Administrative division ==
Živanice consists of three municipal parts (in brackets population according to the 2021 census):

- Živanice (642)
- Dědek (150)
- Nerad (153)

== Demographics ==
Historical population
Year	Pop.	±%
1869	1,029	—
1880	1,075	+4.5%
1890	1,038	−3.4%
1900	1,061	+2.2%
1910	1,059	−0.2%
1921	969	−8.5%
1930	1,003	+3.5%
1950	830	−17.2%
1961	937	+12.9%
1970	883	−5.8%
1980	872	−1.2%
1991	788	−9.6%
2001	828	+5.1%
2011	901	+8.8%
2021	945	+4.9%
Source: Censuses

== Sport ==
Živanice is home of a football club TJ Sokol Živanice. It plays in lower amateur tiers.

== Sights ==
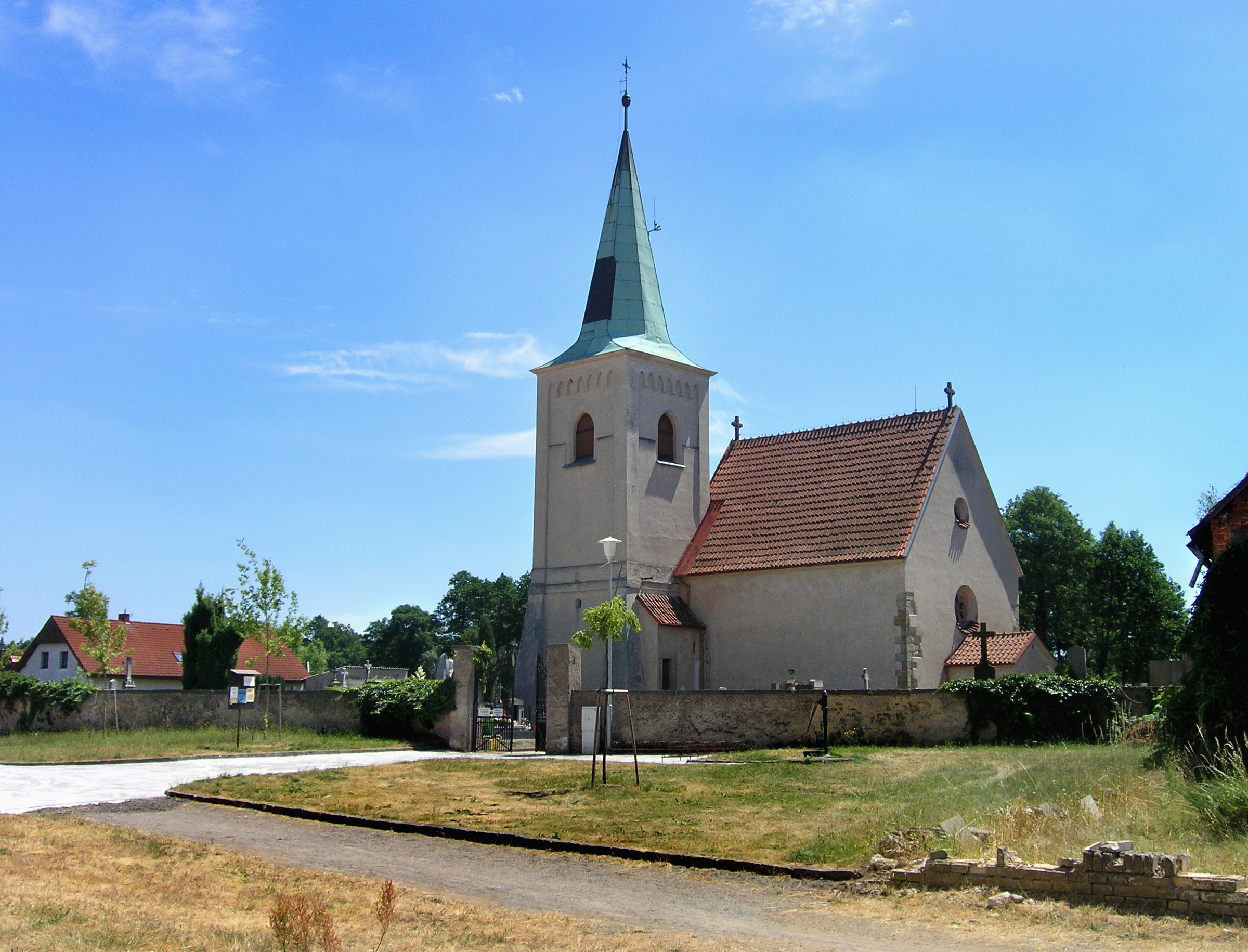
Church of the Annunciation

The main landmark of Živanice is the Church of the Annunciation. It was built in the late Gothic style at the end of the 15th century.
