= Hrobice (Pardubice District) =

- Municipality
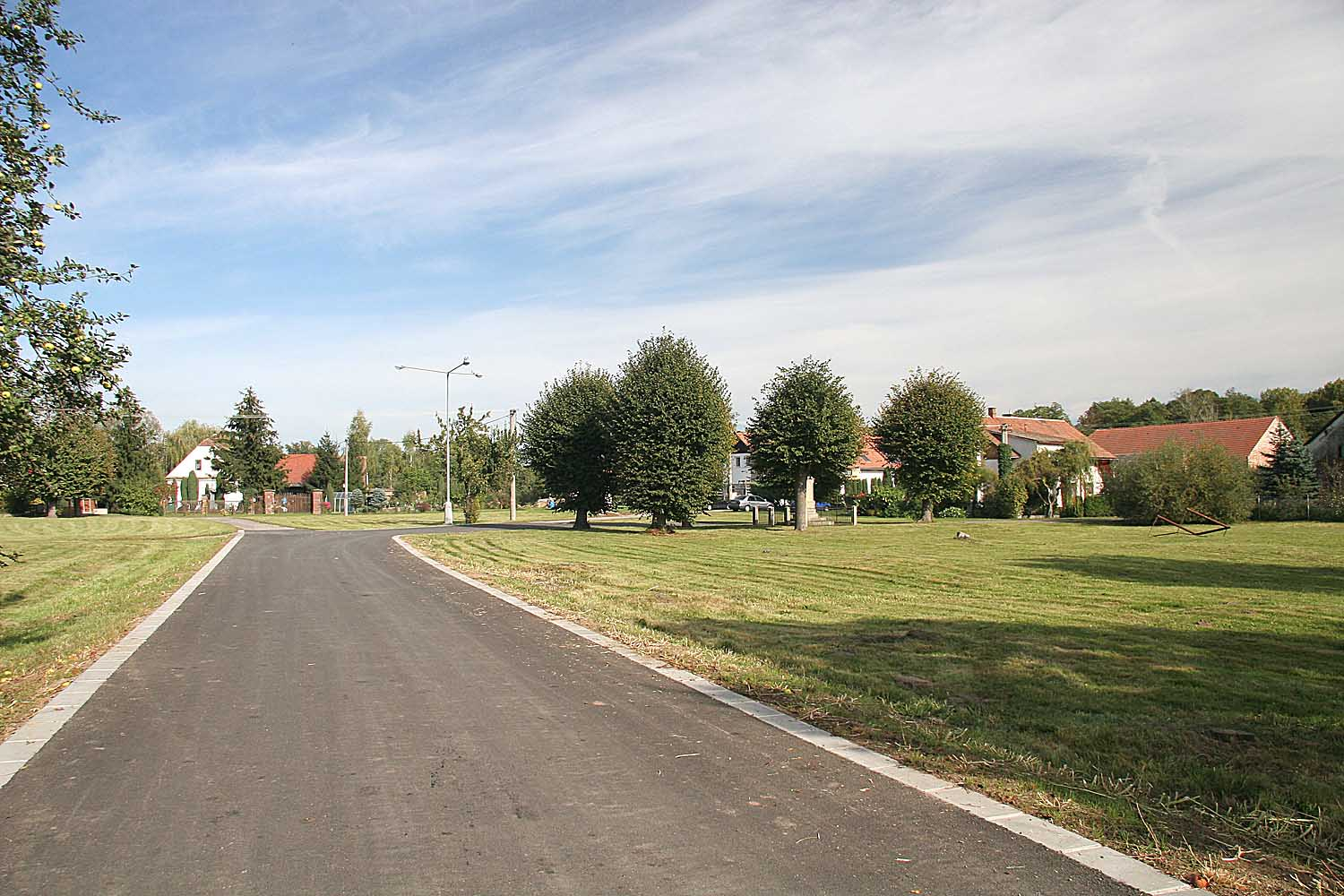
- Centre of Hrobice

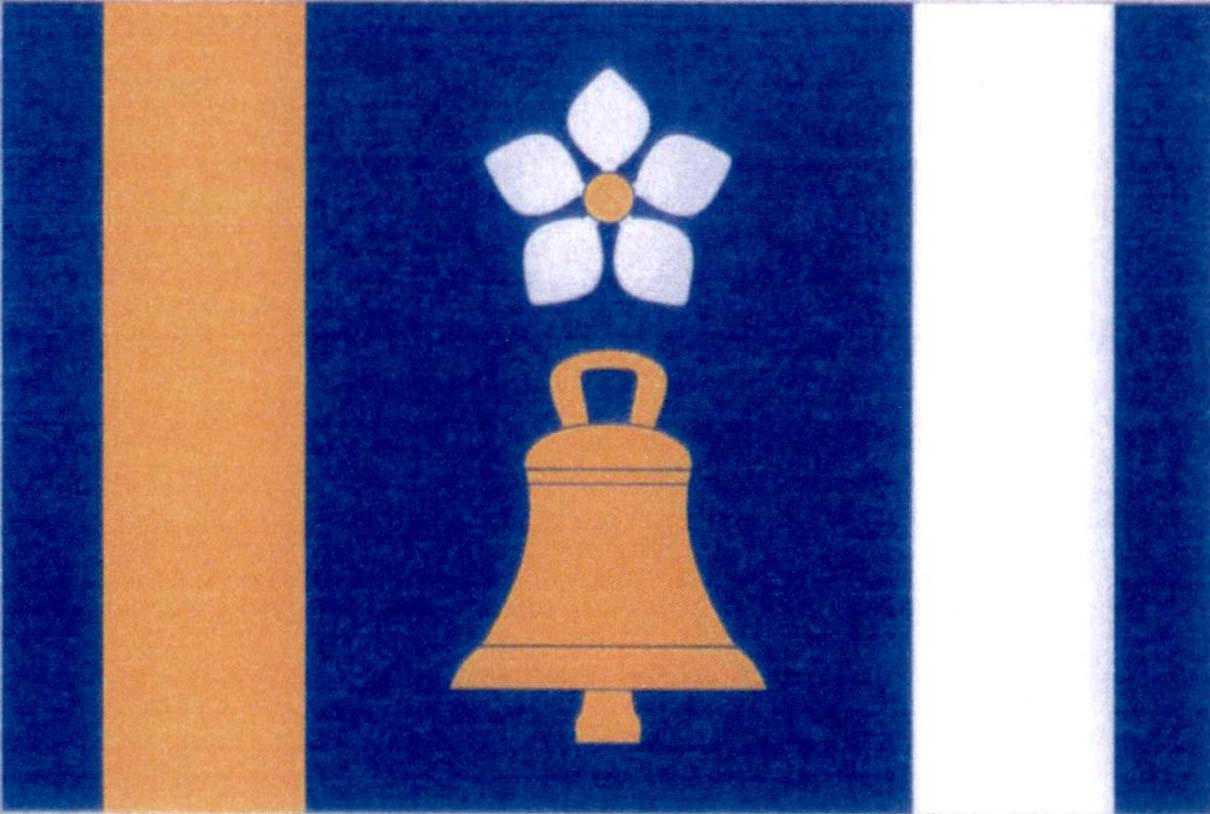
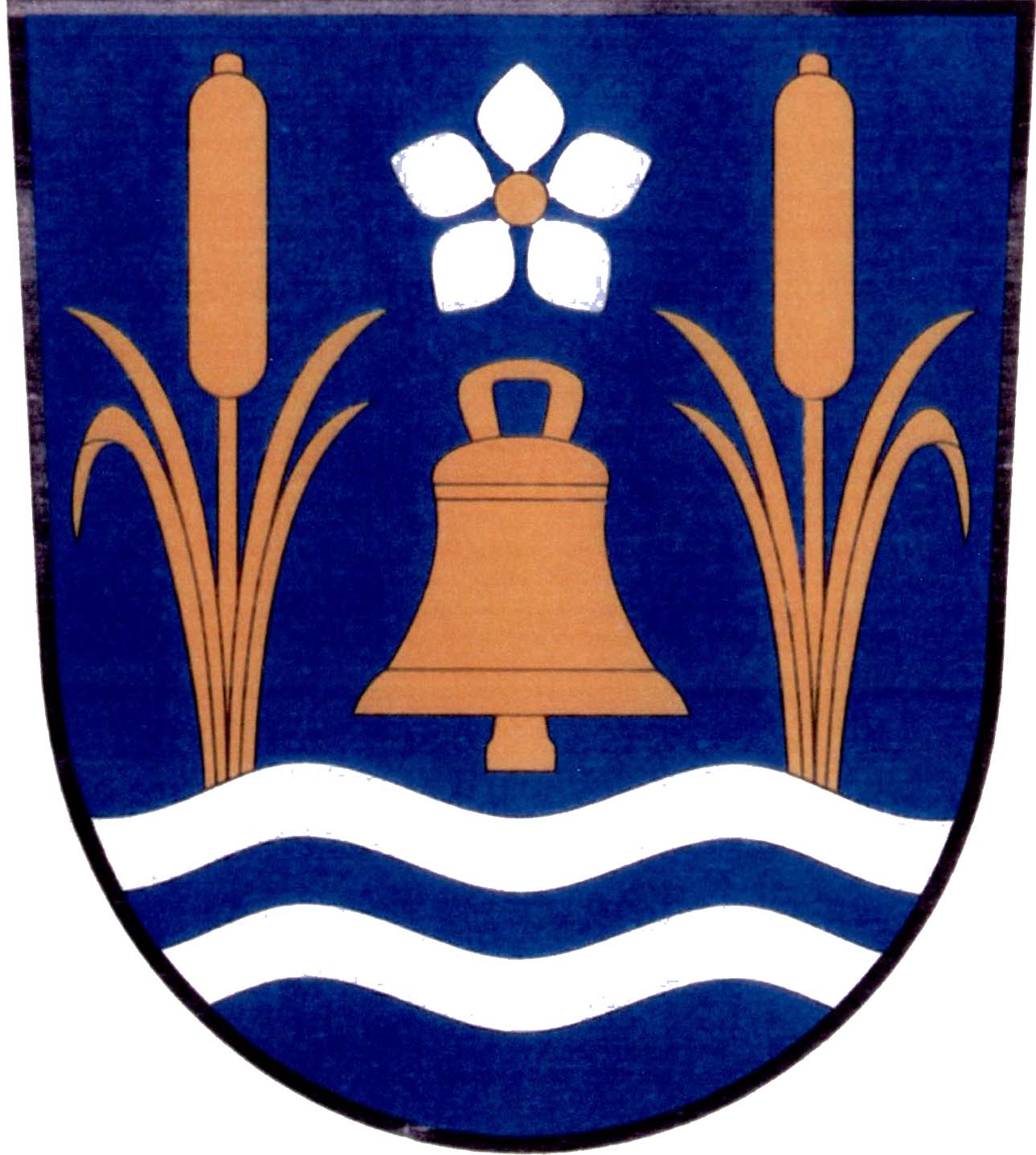
- Flag Coat of arms

- Location in the Czech Republic
- Coordinates: 50°6′12″N 15°47′20″E
- Country: Czech Republic
- Region: Pardubice
- District: Pardubice
- First mentioned: 1371

Area
  - Total: 6.15 km^{2} (2.37 sq mi)
- Elevation: 225 m (738 ft)

Population (2026-01-01)
  - Total: 273
  - Density: 44.4/km^{2} (115/sq mi)
- Time zone: UTC+1 (CET)
  - Summer (DST): UTC+2 (CEST)
- Postal code: 533 52
- Website: www.obec-hrobice.cz

Hrobice is a municipality and village in Pardubice District in the Pardubice Region of the Czech Republic. It has about 300 inhabitants.

== Demographics ==
Historical population
Year	Pop.	±%
1869	173	—
1880	210	+21.4%
1890	193	−8.1%
1900	191	−1.0%
1910	176	−7.9%
1921	157	−10.8%
1930	148	−5.7%
1950	117	−20.9%
1961	223	+90.6%
1970	190	−14.8%
1980	188	−1.1%
1991	163	−13.3%
2001	187	+14.7%
2011	218	+16.6%
2021	230	+5.5%
Source: Censuses
