= Martin Psohlavec =

Czech footballer

Personal information
- Full name: Martin Psohlavec
- Date of birth: 12 February 1981 (age 45)
- Place of birth: Czechoslovakia
- Height: 1.89 m (6 ft 2 in)
- Position: Forward

Youth career
- FK Chmel Blsany

Senior career*
Years	Team	Apps	(Gls)
2007–2008	FC Viktoria Plzeň	33	(3)
2008–2009	1. FC Slovácko	7	(1)
2009	SpVgg Weiden	9	(4)
- * Club domestic league appearances and goals

Martin Psohlavec (born 12 February 1981) is a Czech footballer (forward) who played in the Czech First League for FC Viktoria Plzeň. He later played for 1. FC Slovácko in the second tier before moving to lower-league football.
