= Provodov =

- Municipality
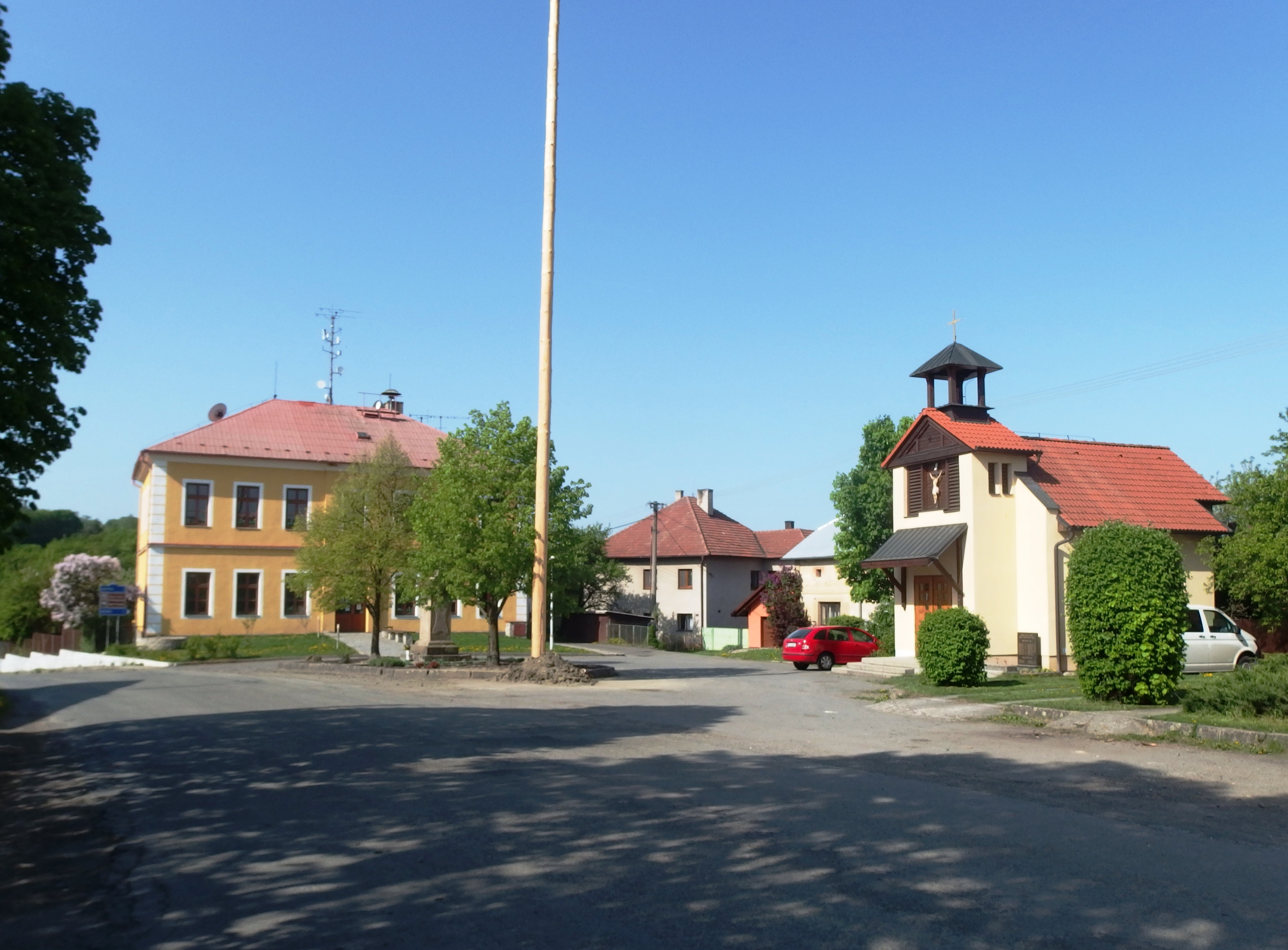
- Centre of Provodov

- Flag Coat of arms

- Location in the Czech Republic
- Coordinates: 49°9′37″N 17°44′12″E
- Country: Czech Republic
- Region: Zlín
- District: Zlín
- First mentioned: 1412

Area
  - Total: 11.95 km^{2} (4.61 sq mi)
- Elevation: 380 m (1,250 ft)

Population (2026-01-01)
  - Total: 794
  - Density: 66.4/km^{2} (172/sq mi)
- Time zone: UTC+1 (CET)
  - Summer (DST): UTC+2 (CEST)
- Postal code: 763 45
- Website: www.provodov.cz

Provodov is a municipality and village in Zlín District in the Zlín Region of the Czech Republic. It has about 800 inhabitants.

Provodov lies approximately 10 kilometres (6 mi) south-east of Zlín and 261 km (162 mi) south-east of Prague.

== Demographics ==
Historical population
Year	Pop.	±%
1869	693	—
1880	707	+2.0%
1890	711	+0.6%
1900	790	+11.1%
1910	893	+13.0%
1921	826	−7.5%
1930	822	−0.5%
1950	928	+12.9%
1961	987	+6.4%
1970	952	−3.5%
1980	865	−9.1%
1991	774	−10.5%
2001	778	+0.5%
2011	768	−1.3%
2021	771	+0.4%
Source: Censuses

== Twin towns – sister cities ==
Provodov is twinned with:

- Lednické Rovne, Slovakia
