= Roudné =

- Municipality
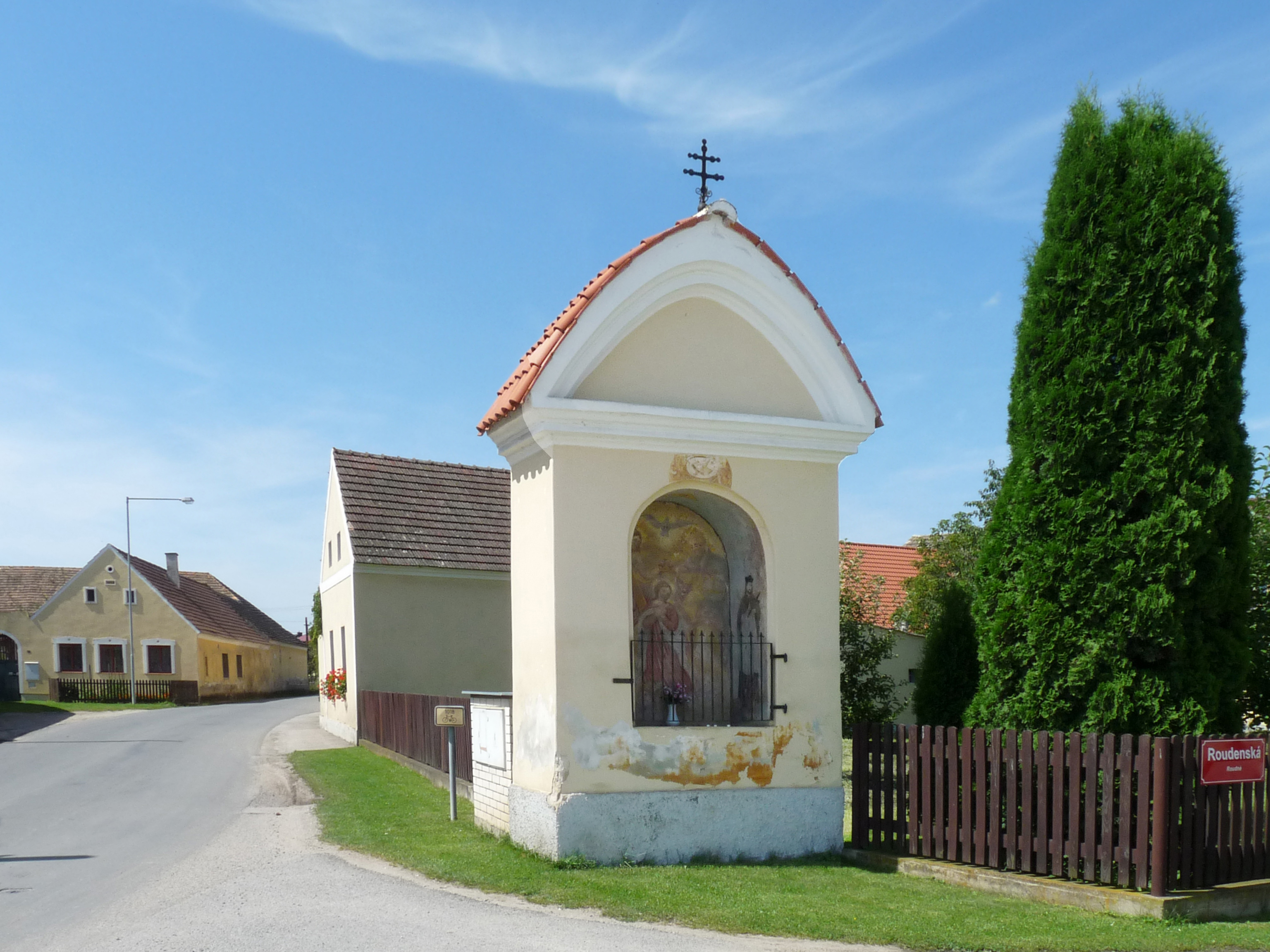
- Niche chapel in Roudné

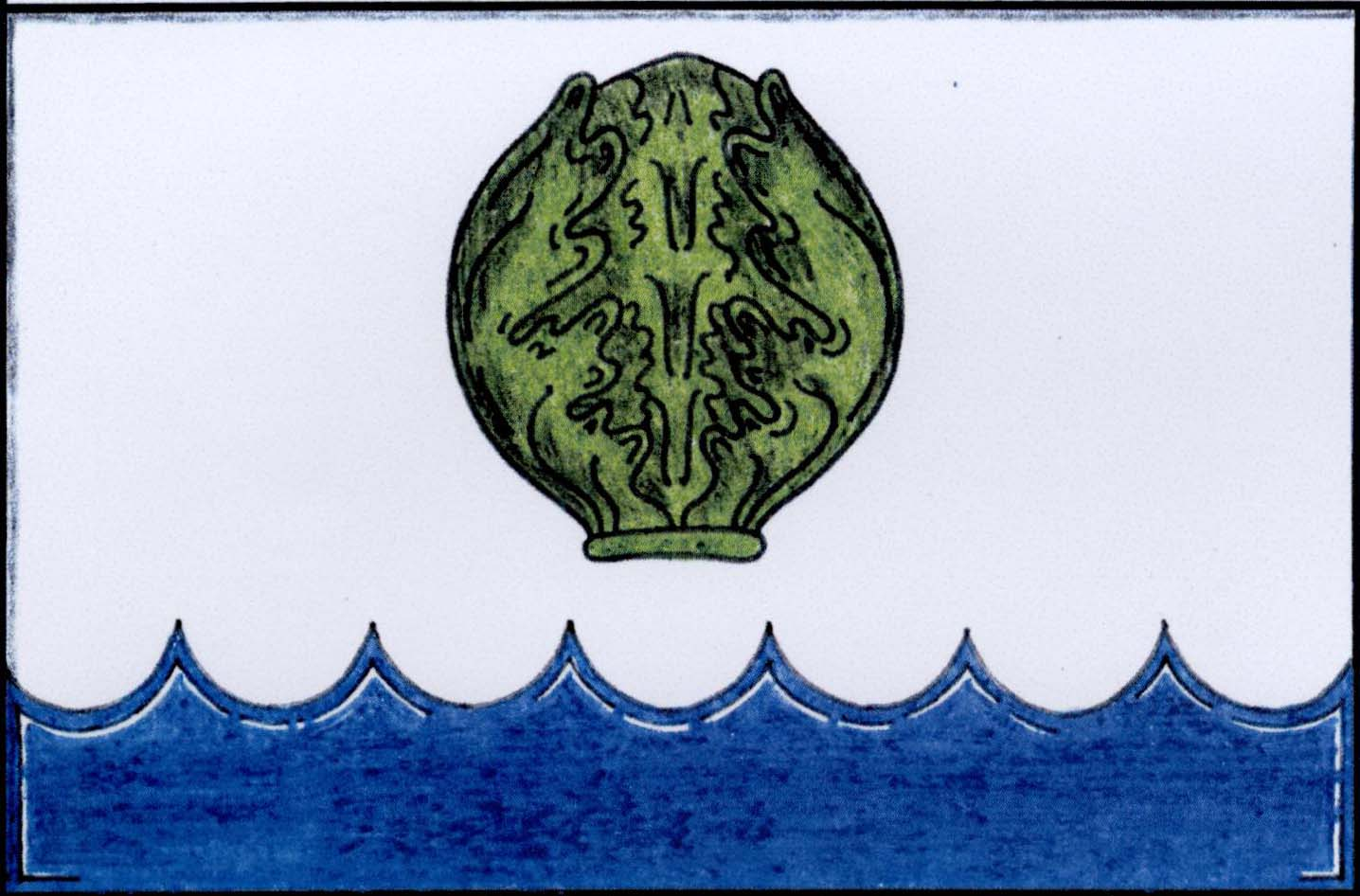
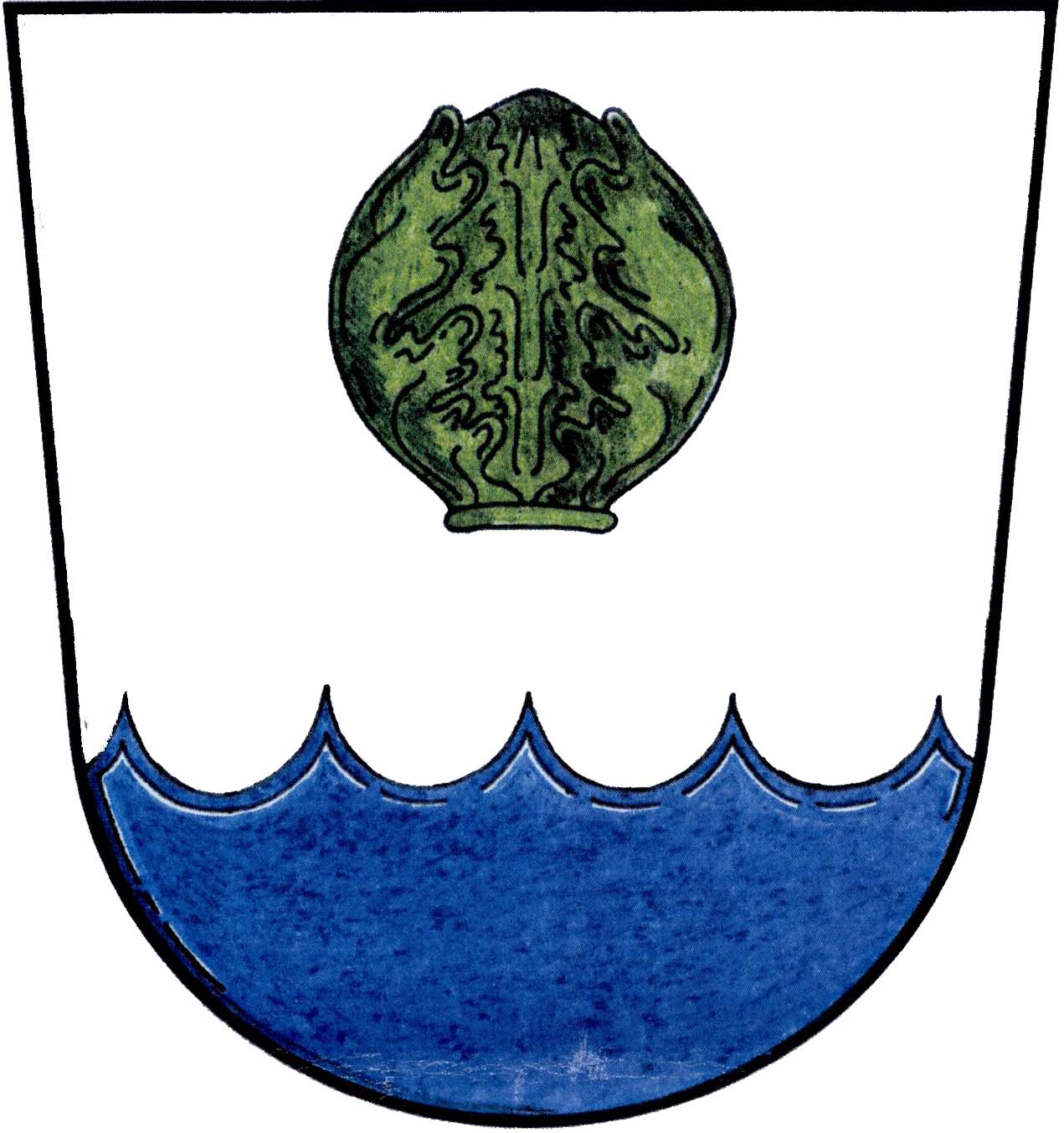
- Flag Coat of arms

- Location in the Czech Republic
- Coordinates: 48°56′6″N 14°29′15″E
- Country: Czech Republic
- Region: South Bohemian
- District: České Budějovice
- First mentioned: 1411

Area
  - Total: 3.83 km^{2} (1.48 sq mi)
- Elevation: 393 m (1,289 ft)

Population (2026-01-01)
  - Total: 1,545
  - Density: 403/km^{2} (1,040/sq mi)
- Time zone: UTC+1 (CET)
  - Summer (DST): UTC+2 (CEST)
- Postal code: 370 07
- Website: www.roudne.cz

Roudné (German: Ruden) is a municipality and village in České Budějovice District in the South Bohemian Region of the Czech Republic. It has about 1,500 inhabitants.

Roudné lies approximately 5 kilometres (3 mi) south of České Budějovice and 128 km (80 mi) south of Prague.

== Demographics ==
Historical population
| Year | Pop. | ±% |
|---|---|---|
| 1869 | 194 | — |
| 1880 | 192 | −1.0% |
| 1890 | 169 | −12.0% |
| 1900 | 176 | +4.1% |
| 1910 | 198 | +12.5% |
| 1921 | 224 | +13.1% |
| 1930 | 295 | +31.7% |
| 1950 | 323 | +9.5% |
| 1961 | 361 | +11.8% |
| 1970 | 370 | +2.5% |
| 1980 | 424 | +14.6% |
| 1991 | 458 | +8.0% |
| 2001 | 554 | +21.0% |
| 2011 | 1,058 | +91.0% |
| 2021 | 1,389 | +31.3% |
Source: Censuses
