= Ždírec nad Doubravou =

- Town
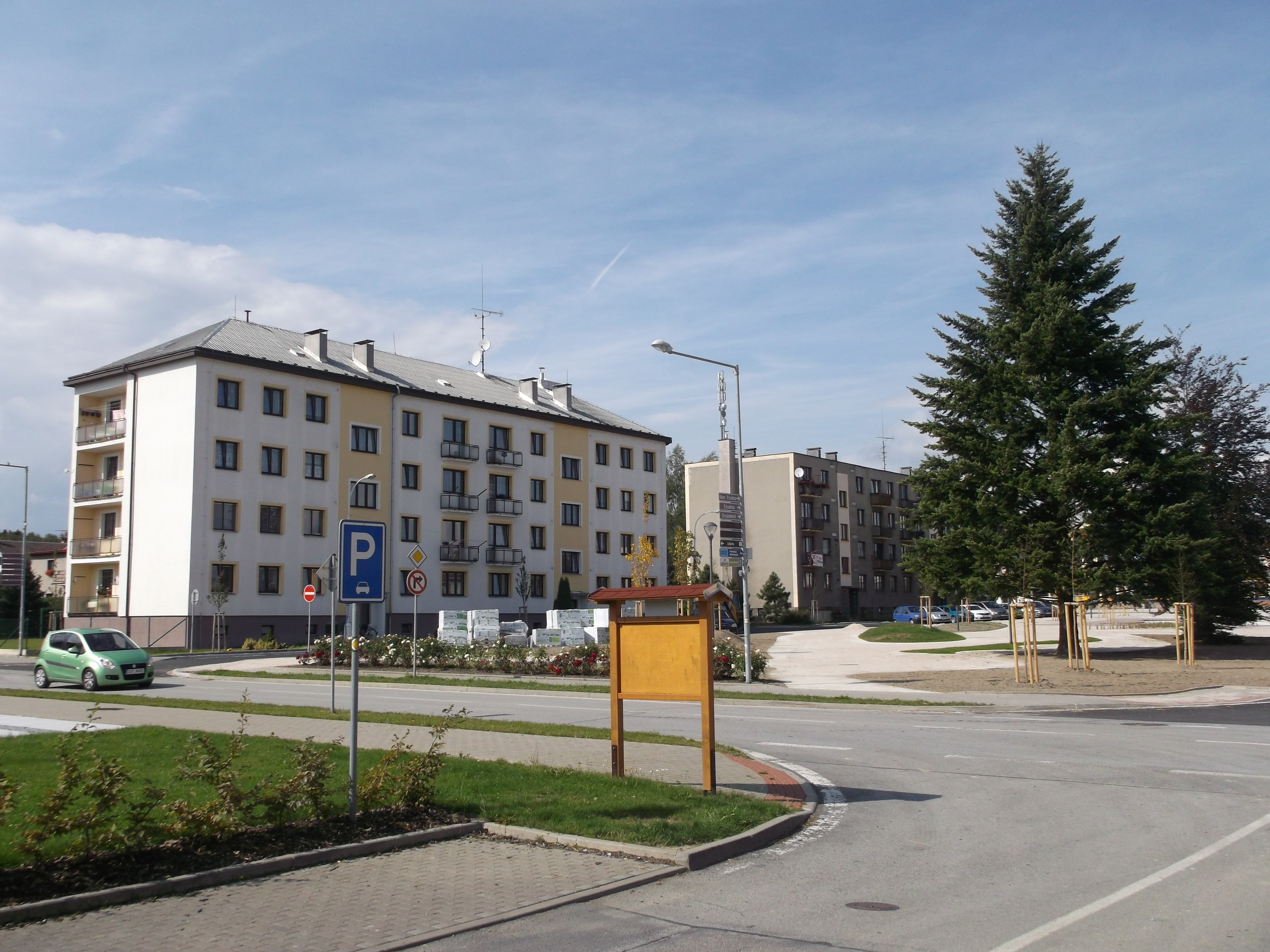
- Town square

- Flag Coat of arms

- Location in the Czech Republic
- Coordinates: 49°41′46″N 15°48′49″E
- Country: Czech Republic
- Region: Vysočina
- District: Havlíčkův Brod
- First mentioned: 1399

Government
  - Mayor: Bohumír Nikl

Area
  - Total: 26.73 km^{2} (10.32 sq mi)
- Elevation: 545 m (1,788 ft)

Population (2026-01-01)
  - Total: 3,064
  - Density: 114.6/km^{2} (296.9/sq mi)
- Time zone: UTC+1 (CET)
  - Summer (DST): UTC+2 (CEST)
- Postal code: 582 63
- Website: www.zdirec.cz

Ždírec nad Doubravou (Czech pronunciation: [ˈʒɟiːrɛts ˈnad doubravou]; until 1950 Ždírec) is a town in Havlíčkův Brod District in the Vysočina Region of the Czech Republic. It has about 3,100 inhabitants. The town is located on the Doubrava River, on the border between the Upper Sázava Hills and Iron Mountains.

Ždírec nad Doubravou was founded in the 14th century, but it became a town only in 2000.

== Administrative division ==
Ždírec nad Doubravou consists of eight municipal parts (in brackets population according to the 2021 census):

- Ždírec nad Doubravou (2,191)
- Benátky (141)
- Horní Studenec (235)
- Kohoutov (89)
- Nové Ransko (93)
- Nový Studenec (116)
- Stružinec (36)
- Údavy (93)

== Etymology ==
The name Ždírec is derived from the Old Czech word žďářit, which means "to remove the forest with fire" (slash-and-burn). It refers to the method used during colonisation to create space for newly established settlements.

== Geography ==
Ždírec nad Doubravou is located about 19 kilometres (12 mi) northeast of Havlíčkův Brod and 35 km (22 mi) northeast of Jihlava. The town proper lies in the Upper Sázava Hills, but most of the municipal territory lies in the Iron Mountains. The highest point is the hill Barchanec at 624 m (2,047 ft) above sea level.

The town is situated on the right bank of the Doubrava River. The municipal territory lies in the protected landscape areas of Železné hory and Žďárské vrchy.

== History ==
The first written mention of Ždírec nad Doubravou is from 1399. It was probably founded shortly before, during the colonisation of the area. For centuries, it was a small village administered as a part of the Přibyslav estate, and since 1677 as part of the Polná estate.

The worst tragedy in the history of Ždírec nad Doubravou took place on 9 May 1945, when it was damaged by a Red Army raid and dozens of inhabitants were killed. In the second half of the 20th century, the village began to be expanded, and the number of inhabitants grew. In 2000, Ždírec nad Doubravou was promoted to a town.

== Demographics ==
Historical population

Year	Pop.	±%
1869	2,276	—
1880	2,687	+18.1%
1890	2,753	+2.5%
1900	2,725	−1.0%
1910	2,974	+9.1%

Year	Pop.	±%
1921	2,588	−13.0%
1930	2,656	+2.6%
1950	2,078	−21.8%
1961	2,355	+13.3%
1970	2,618	+11.2%

Year	Pop.	±%
1980	2,852	+8.9%
1991	2,792	−2.1%
2001	2,783	−0.3%
2011	3,095	+11.2%
2021	2,994	−3.3%

Source: Censuses

== Economy ==
The largest employer based in the town is Stora Enso Wood Products Ždírec, a manufacturer of paper and wooden products. It employs more than 500 people.

== Transport ==
The town is situated at the crossroads of two main roads: I/34 (from Havlíčkův Brod to Svitavy) and I/37 (the section from Chrudim to Žďár nad Sázavou).

Ždírec nad Doubravou is located on the railway line Pardubice–Havlíčkův Brod.

== Sights ==
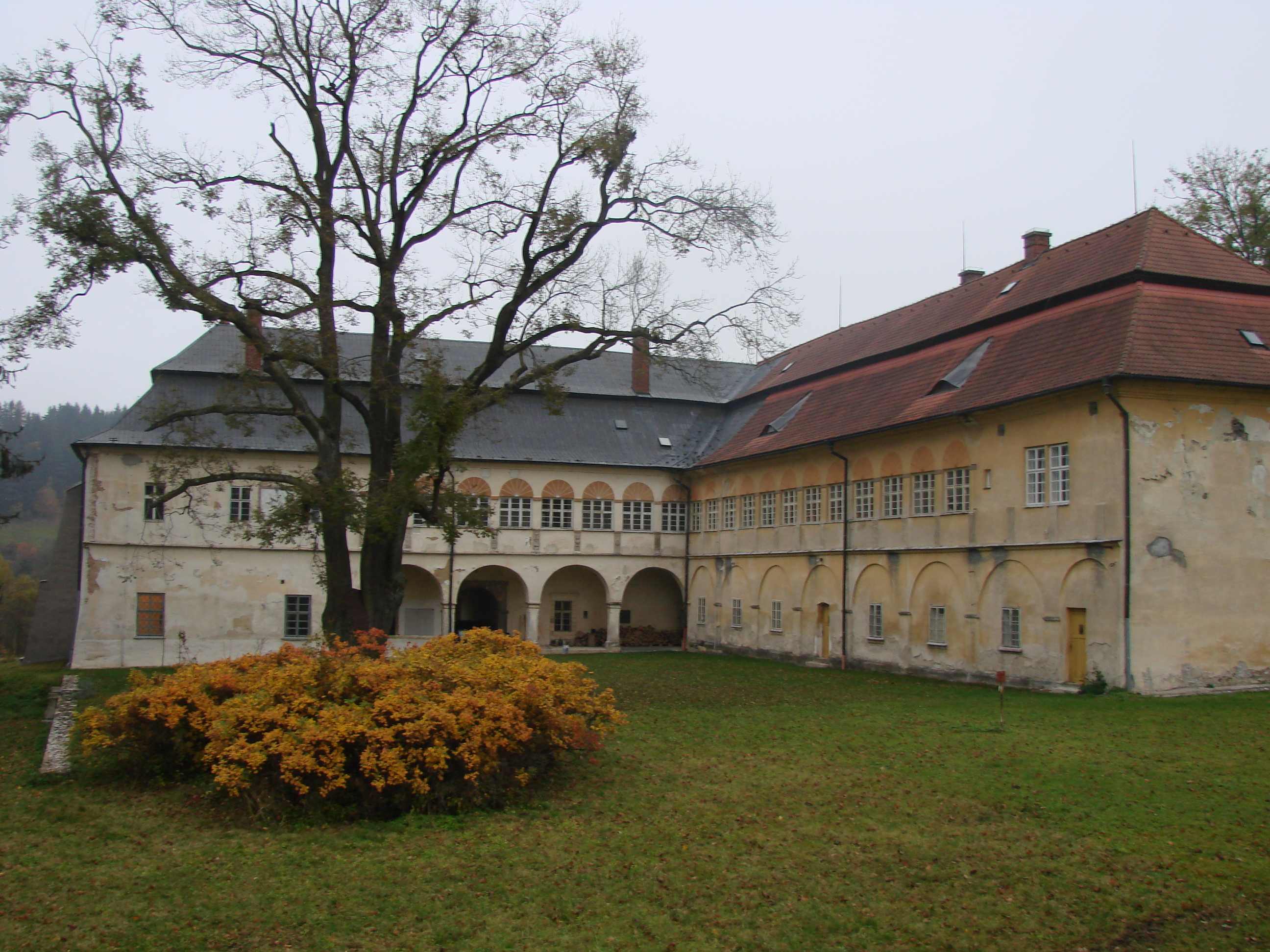
Nový Studenec Castle

The Church of Saint Wenceslaus was originally a Gothic building, first mentioned in 1352. Its present appearance is a result of a Baroque reconstruction. Next to the church is a separate wooden bell tower.

The Nový Studenec Castle was originally a fortress, rebuilt in the Renaissance style in 1592. In 1612, the fortress was rebuilt into a late Renaissance castle. The chapel was added around 1699. In the 18th century, the chapel was rebuilt and the third wing of the castle was removed. Today the building is privately owned.

== Twin towns – sister cities ==
Ždírec nad Doubravou is twinned with:

- Michelhausen, Austria
- Velké Pavlovice, Czech Republic
