= TJ Sokol Živanice =

Sokol Živanice
- Full name: Tělocvičná jednota Sokol Živanice
- Founded: 1958; 68 years ago
- Ground: Sportovní areál Živanice
- Capacity: 2,000
- Chairman: Jiří Novák
- Manager: Roman Oliva
- League: Bohemian Football League B
- 2023–24: 10th
- Website: https://sokolzivanice.webnode.cz/
| Home colours | Away colours |

TJ Sokol Živanice is a football club from the village of Živanice in the Pardubice Region of the Czech Republic. The club plays in the Bohemian Football League, which is the third tier of Czech football system.

The team made national headlines in the 2009–10 Czech Cup when, as a fourth-tier amateur team, they defeated top clubs such as Mladá Boleslav and Vítkovice, en route to the fourth round, where they finally lost to Jablonec. The season ended badly for the team, as they were relegated from the Czech Fourth Division on the last day of the season.

== Honours ==
- Czech Fourth Division C
  - Champions 2017–2018
