= Vykáň =

- Municipality
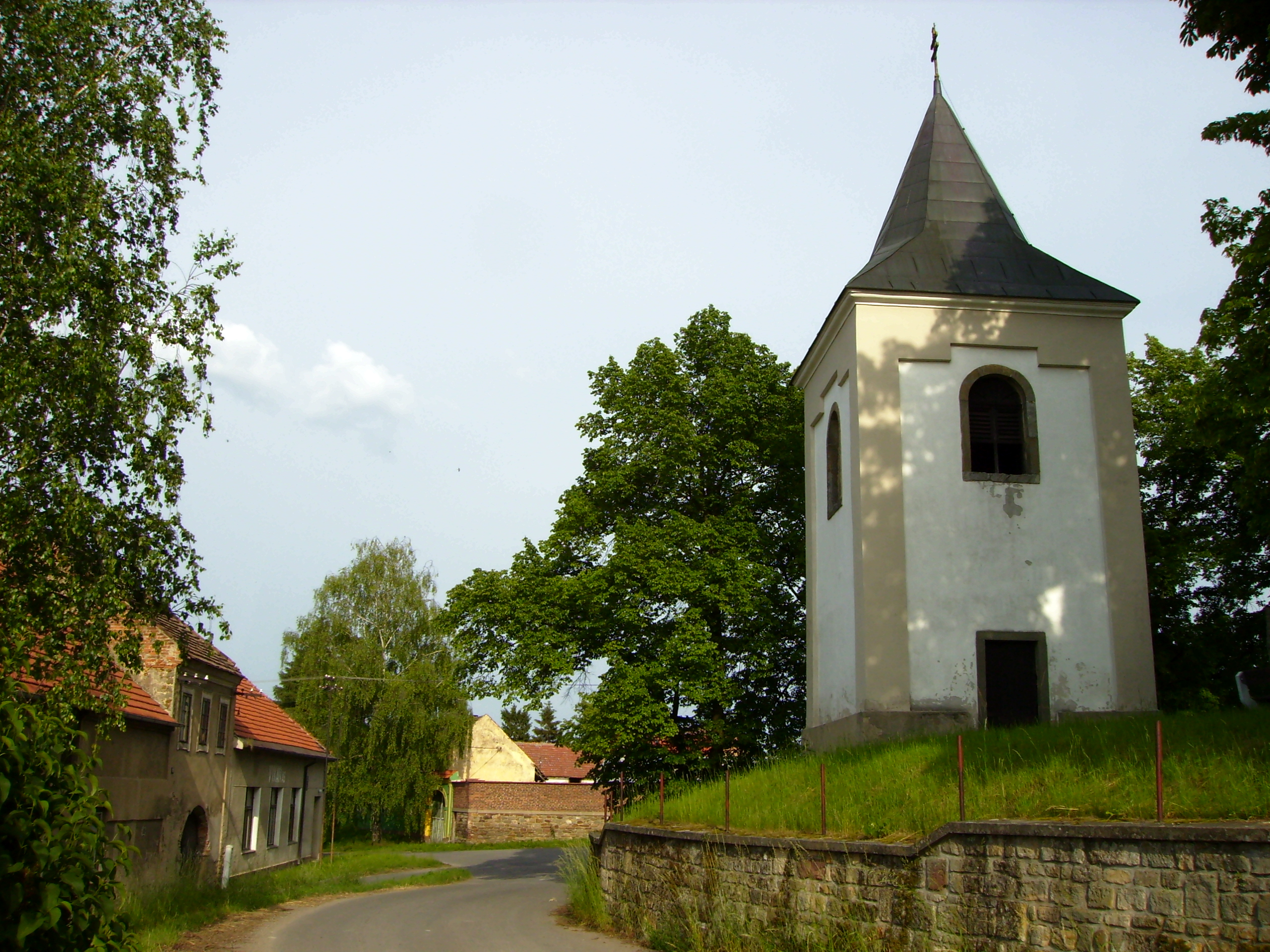
- Belfry

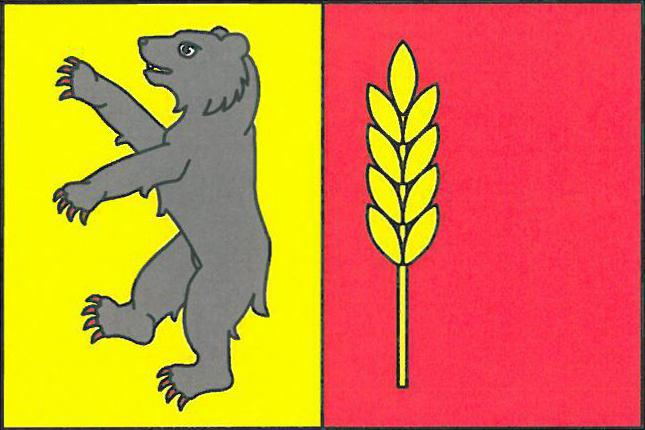
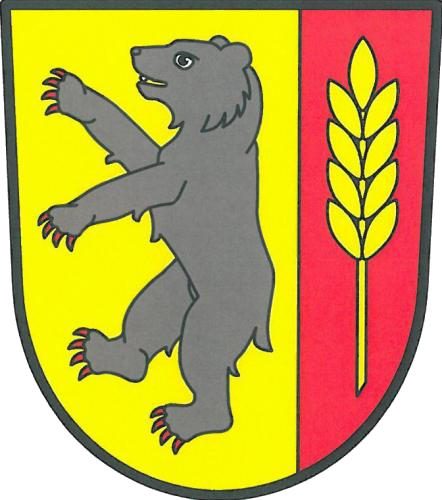
- Flag Coat of arms

- Location in the Czech Republic
- Coordinates: 50°7′12″N 14°49′0″E
- Country: Czech Republic
- Region: Central Bohemian
- District: Nymburk
- First mentioned: 993

Area
  - Total: 6.17 km^{2} (2.38 sq mi)
- Elevation: 194 m (636 ft)

Population (2026-01-01)
  - Total: 438
  - Density: 71.0/km^{2} (184/sq mi)
- Time zone: UTC+1 (CET)
  - Summer (DST): UTC+2 (CEST)
- Postal code: 289 15
- Website: www.vykan.cz

Vykáň is a municipality and village in Nymburk District in the Central Bohemian Region of the Czech Republic. It has about 400 inhabitants.

== History ==
The first written mention of Vykáň is from 993, when Adalbert of Prague donated the village to the newly established Břevnov Monastery. It was owned by the monastery until the Hussite Wars.

== Demographics ==
Historical population
Year	Pop.	±%
1869	456	—
1880	524	+14.9%
1890	533	+1.7%
1900	485	−9.0%
1910	573	+18.1%
1921	568	−0.9%
1930	523	−7.9%
1950	387	−26.0%
1961	409	+5.7%
1970	347	−15.2%
1980	321	−7.5%
1991	273	−15.0%
2001	328	+20.1%
2011	388	+18.3%
2021	391	+0.8%
Source: Censuses
