= Hrobce =

- Municipality
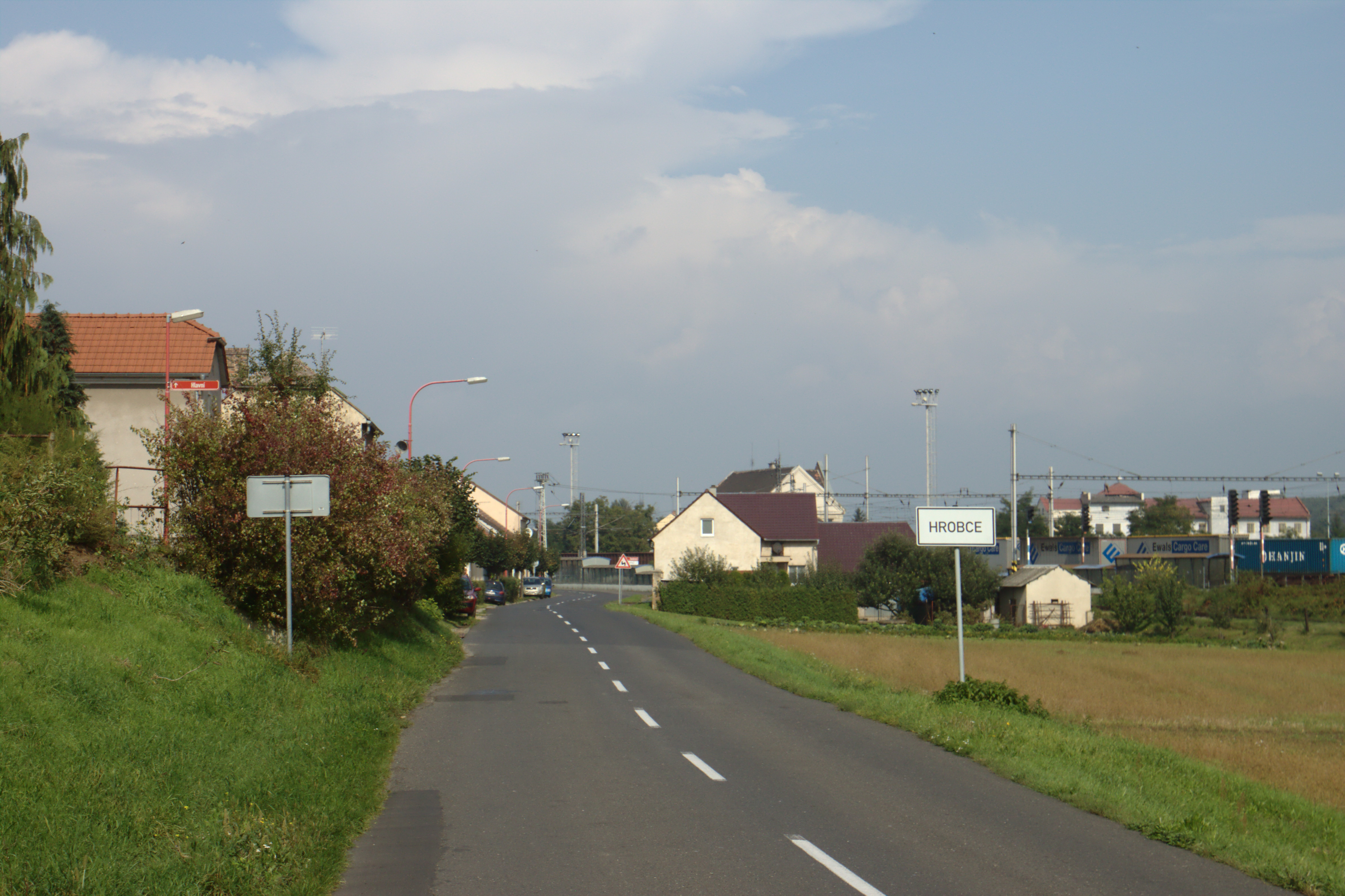
- View from the south

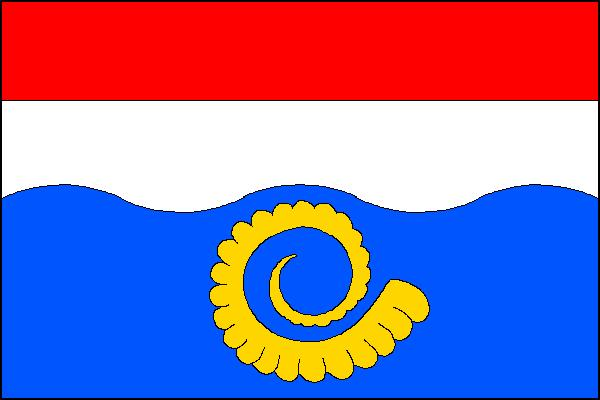
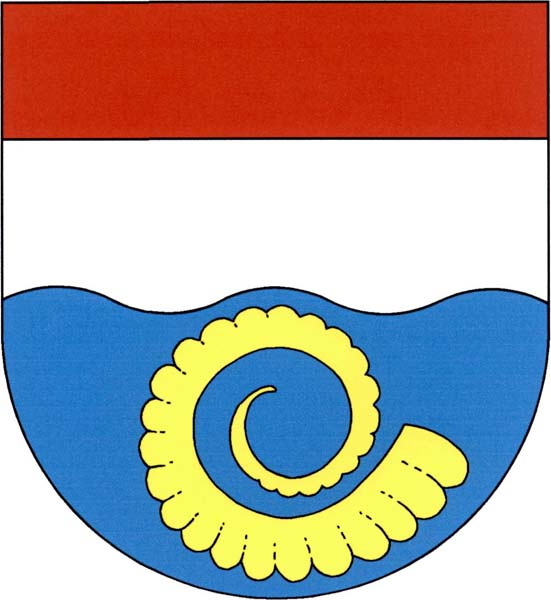
- Flag Coat of arms

- Location in the Czech Republic
- Coordinates: 50°27′45″N 14°13′51″E
- Country: Czech Republic
- Region: Ústí nad Labem
- District: Litoměřice
- First mentioned: 1115

Area
  - Total: 7.38 km^{2} (2.85 sq mi)
- Elevation: 153 m (502 ft)

Population (2026-01-01)
  - Total: 741
  - Density: 100/km^{2} (260/sq mi)
- Time zone: UTC+1 (CET)
  - Summer (DST): UTC+2 (CEST)
- Postal codes: 411 83, 412 01
- Website: hrobce.cz

Hrobce (Czech pronunciation: [ˈɦroptsɛ]) is a municipality and village in Litoměřice District in the Ústí nad Labem Region of the Czech Republic. It has about 700 inhabitants.

Hrobce lies approximately 12 kilometres (7 mi) south-east of Litoměřice, 26 km (16 mi) south-east of Ústí nad Labem, and 44 km (27 mi) north of Prague.

== Administrative division ==
Hrobce consists of two municipal parts (in brackets population according to the 2021 census):

- Hrobce (431)
- Rohatce (271)

== Demographics ==
Historical population
Year	Pop.	±%
1869	420	—
1880	508	+21.0%
1890	576	+13.4%
1900	692	+20.1%
1910	843	+21.8%
1921	894	+6.0%
1930	957	+7.0%
1950	638	−33.3%
1961	673	+5.5%
1970	663	−1.5%
1980	567	−14.5%
1991	495	−12.7%
2001	509	+2.8%
2011	583	+14.5%
2021	702	+20.4%
Source: Censuses
