= Desna =

Desna or Desná may refer to:

== Places ==
=== Settlements ===
- Desná (Jablonec nad Nisou District), a town in the Liberec Region of the Czech Republic
- Dešná (Jindřichův Hradec District), a municipality and village in the South Bohemian Region of the Czech Republic
- Desná (Svitavy District), a municipality and village in the Pardubice Region of the Czech Republic
- Dešná (Zlín District), a municipality and village in the Zlín Region of the Czech Republic
- Desna, Bihar, a village in Nalanda District of Bihar, India
- Desna, Chernihiv Oblast, a rural settlement in Chernihiv Oblast of Ukraine
- Desna, Vinnytsia Oblast, a rural settlement in Vinnytsia Oblast of Ukraine

=== Rivers ===
- Desna (river), a river in Russia and Ukraine
- Desna (Vrbas), a river in Bosnia and Herzegovina
- Desna (Guslitsa), a tributary of the Guslitsa, a river in Moscow Oblast, Russia
- Desna (Pakhra), a tributary of the Pakhra, a river in Moscow Oblast, Russia
- Desna (Southern Bug), a tributary of the Southern Bug in Ukraine
- Desná (Kamenice), a tributary of the Kamenice, a river in the Jizera Mountains of the Czech Republic
- Desná (Morava), river in the Hrubý Jeseník Mountains of the Czech Republic

== Other ==
- R-9 Desna, Russian intercontinental ballistic missile
- FC Desna Chernihiv, a Ukrainian football club based in Chernihiv
- Desná Dam, a former dam, collapsed in 1916
