= 2006–07 Czech Cup =

Pohár ČMFS

Tournament details
- Country: Czech Republic
- Teams: 128

Final positions
- Champions: Sparta Prague
- Runners-up: Jablonec 97

Tournament statistics
- Top goal scorer: Vojtěch Zedníček (6 goals)

The 2006–07 Czech Cup was the 14th edition of the annual football knockout tournament organized by the Czech Football Association of the Czech Republic. It began on 22 July 2006 with the preliminary round and ended with the final on 24 May 2007.

Sparta Prague prevailed at the 24 May 2007 Cup and qualified for the 2007–08 UEFA Cup but as they also qualified for the Champions League via the Czech First League in the same season, the place went to Jablonec 97 as runner-up.

== Teams ==
Round	Clubs remaining	Clubs involved	Winners from previous round	New entries this round	Leagues entering at this round
Preliminary round	128	32	none	32	Levels 4 and 5 in football league pyramid
First round	112	96	16	80	Czech 2. Liga; Bohemian Football League; Moravian-Silesian Football League; Czech Fourth Division
Second round	64	64	48	16	Czech First League
Third round	32	32	32	none	none
Fourth round	16	16	16	none	none
Quarter finals	8	8	8	none	none
Semi finals	4	4	4	none	none
Final	2	2	2	none	none

== Preliminary round ==
The preliminary round took place on 22 July 2006.

Team 1	Score	Team 2
TJ Desná	2–0	Hlavice
Bavorovice	0–2	Jankov
Polaban Nymburk	1–1; 2-4 pen	Meteor Prague
Město Touškov	2–3	Toužim
Nový Bydžov	3–1	Týniště n. Orlicí
Holice v Čechách	0–0; 5-4 pen	Tesla Pardubice
Votice	0–3	Benešov
Protivanov	0–3	Konice
Štěpánkovice	0–4	Orlová
Boskovice	3–0	Líšeň
Val. Příkazy	0–1	Slavičín
Přibyslav	1–5	Žďár n.Sázavou
Hartvíkovice	1–3	Třebíč
Kroměříž	5–0	Šardice
Baník Albrechtice	1–4	Český Těšín
Hulín	6–1	Morkovice

== Round 1 ==
The first round was played on 29 July 2006.

Team 1	Score	Team 2
TJ Desná	0–0; 4-3 pen	Sedmihorky
Nový Bor	3–3; 5-4 pen	Slovan Varnsdorf
Jankov	3–5	Jiskra Třeboň
Malše Roudné	3–0	Strakonice 1908
Sezimovo Ústí	0–2	Prachatice
Meteor Prague	1–0	Dobrovice
Jirny	4–3	Ovčáry
Admira Prague	2–3	SK Český Brod
Toužim	0–5	K.Vary-Dvory
Loko Chomutov	0–4	Litvínov
Řezuz Děčín	1–4	FK Ústí n.Labem
FK Chomutov	1–0	FK Chmel Blšany
Nový Bydžov	1–7	Náchod-Deštné
Dvůr Králové	3–1	FK Agria Choceň
FK Trutnov	2–0	Předměřice
Holice v Čechách	1–1; 5-6 pen	Letohrad
FC Hlinsko	1–4	FC Hradec Králové
Jiskra Ústí n. Orlicí	2–2; 3-1 pen	AFK Chrudim
Benešov	0–1	Sparta Krč
Horažďovice	0–2	Klatovy
Vejprnice	1–1; 5-4 pen	Doubravka
Motorlet Prague	0–1	FK Baník Sokolov
Králův Dvůr	0–1	FK Viktoria Žižkov
Libiš	2–3	FC Velim
Stříbrná Skalice	0–1	Bohemians 1905
FC Bzová	0–2	Bohemians Prague
Loko Vltavín	0–4	FC Zenit Čáslav
Slavoj Vyšehrad	0–3	FK Kolín
Velké Meziříčí	0–3	FC Vysočina Jihlava
Třebíč	0–3	Znojmo
Žďár n.Sázavou	2–4	FC Dosta-Bystrc
Hrušovany	1–1; 3-4 pen	Břeclav
Boskovice	1–1; 4-2 pen	Mutěnice
Vyškov	1–0	Hranice
Slavičín	3–1	Bystřice p. Host.
Rousínov	2–0	Napajedla
Kroměříž	2–1	Brumov
Karlovice-Karolinka	2–0	Frýdek Místek
ČAFC Židenice	0–3	Lipová
Konice	1–2	Uničov
Zábřeh	0–0; 4-5 pen	1. HFK Olomouc
Hulín	0–2	Fulnek
Dětmarovice	3–2	Dolní Benešov
Karviná	1–3	FC Hlučín
Orlová	2–6	FC Vítkovice
Město Albrechtice	0–3	SFC Opava
Frenštát	0–4	Jakubčovice
Český Těšín	0–1	Fotbal Třinec

== Round 2 ==
The second round was played on 3 August 2006.

Team 1	Score	Team 2
TJ Desná	0–4	FC Slovan Liberec
Jiskra Třeboň	1–1; 5-4 pen	Malše Roudné
FC Vysočina Jihlava	1–2	SK Dynamo České Budějovice
Meteor Prague	3–0	Jirny
Dvůr Králové	2–5	AC Sparta Prague
Znojmo	1–2	FC Dosta-Bystrc
Břeclav	0–0; 5-4 pen	1. FC Brno
Rousínov	4–3	Lipová
SK Český Brod	0–5	FK Siad Most
Litvínov	0–2	K.Vary-Dvory
Nový Bor	0–3	FK Jablonec 97
FK Chomutov	0–0; 4-3 pen	FK Ústí nad Labem
FK Baník Sokolov	1–3	FK Marila Příbram
Klatovy	6–1	Vejprnice
FC Zenit Čáslav	4–3	SK Slavia Prague
FC Velim	0–2	FK Viktoria Žižkov
Bohemians 1905	1–1; 5-6 pen	FK Teplice
Bohemians Prague	1–1; 4-3 pen	FK Kolín
Prachatice	0–1	FC Viktoria Plzeň
Slavičín	0–4	1. HFK Olomouc
Boskovice	2–5	1. FC Slovácko
Vyškov	0–0; 6-5 pen	FC Vítkovice
Uničov	0–3	SK Sigma Olomouc
Dětmarovice	1–2	SFC Opava
FC Hlučín	0–2	FC Baník Ostrava
Fulnek	1–1; 6-7 pen	Jakubčovice Fotbal
Kroměříž	0–4	FC Tescoma Zlín
Karlovice-Karolinka	0–0; 9-10 pen	Fotbal Třinec
Sparta Krč	0–1	SK Kladno
Jiskra Ústí n. Orlicí	0–2	FC Hradec Králové
FK Trutnov	2–3	Letohrad
Náchod-Deštné	2–6	FK Mladá Boleslav

== Round 3 ==
The third round was played on 20 September 2006.

Team 1	Score	Team 2
Jiskra Třeboň	0–3	FC Slovan Liberec
Meteor Prague	1–2	SK Dynamo České Budějovice
FC Dosta Bystrc	0–6	AC Sparta Prague
Rousínov	0–3	Břeclav
K.Vary-Dvory	1–2	FK Siad Most
FK Chomutov	1–3	FK Jablonec 97
Klatovy	1–5	FK Marila Příbram
FK Viktoria Žižkov	2–0	FC Zenit Čáslav
Bohemians Prague	1–2	FK Teplice
1. HFK Olomouc	1–2	FC Viktoria Plzeň
Vyškov	0–2	1. FC Slovácko
SFC Opava	1–1; 4-2 pen	SK Sigma Olomouc
Jakubčovice Fotbal	1–2	FC Baník Ostrava
Fotbal Třinec	1–2	FC Tescoma Zlín
FC Hradec Králové	1–0	SK Kladno
Letohrad	0–1	FK Mladá Boleslav

== Round 4 ==
The fourth round was played on 25 October 2006.

Team 1	Score	Team 2
FC Slovan Liberec	1–2	SK Dynamo České Budějovice
Břeclav	0–2	AC Sparta Prague
FK Siad Most	0–2	FK Jablonec 97
FK Viktoria Žižkov	1–1; 2-4 pen	FK Marila Příbram
FC Viktoria Plzeň	0–0; 4-3 pen	FK Teplice
SFC Opava	0–1	1. FC Slovácko
FC Tescoma Zlín	1–0	FC Baník Ostrava
FC Hradec Králové	1–4	FK Mladá Boleslav

== Quarterfinals ==
The quarterfinals were played on 25 April 2007.

Team 1	Score	Team 2
FC Viktoria Plzeň	0–3	FK Jablonec 97
FC Tescoma Zlín	2–1	FK Mladá Boleslav
FK Marila Příbram	1–2	AC Sparta Prague
SK Dynamo České Budějovice	2–0	1. FC Slovácko

== Semifinals ==
The semifinals were played on 16 and 17 May 2007.

Team 1	Score	Team 2
FK Jablonec 97	0–0; 4-2 pen	SK Dynamo České Budějovice
FC Tescoma Zlín	1–2	AC Sparta Prague

== Final ==
24 May 2007
17:15 CEST

FK Jablonec 97	1–2	AC Sparta Prague
Svátek 6'	Report	45' Kulič; 68' (pen.) Horváth

Stadion Evžena Rošického, Prague
Attendance: 6,022
Referee: Jiří Jech

== See also ==
- 2006–07 Czech First League
- 2006–07 Czech 2. Liga
