= TJ Desná =

Football club based in Czech Republic

- Full name: Tělovýchovná jednota Desná
- Founded: 1946
- Ground: gymnasium of ZŚ Desná and Městský areál Desná - Údolní 426 Desná, Czech Republic 07416
- League: I.B Class
- 2022–23: 9th
- Website: https://tjdesna.webnode.cz/

TJ Desná is an association football club based in Desná, Czech Republic. It plays in lower amateur tiers.

== History ==
TJ Desná was established in 1946. The club is currently based in Desná in the Jablonec nad Nisou District in Czech Republic. The team play in I.B Class competition. In 2006–07, the team got into the round 2 of the Czech Cup.

== Infrastructure ==
The training ground is in gymnasium of Desná primary school and in Městský areál Desná.
