= Desná Dam =

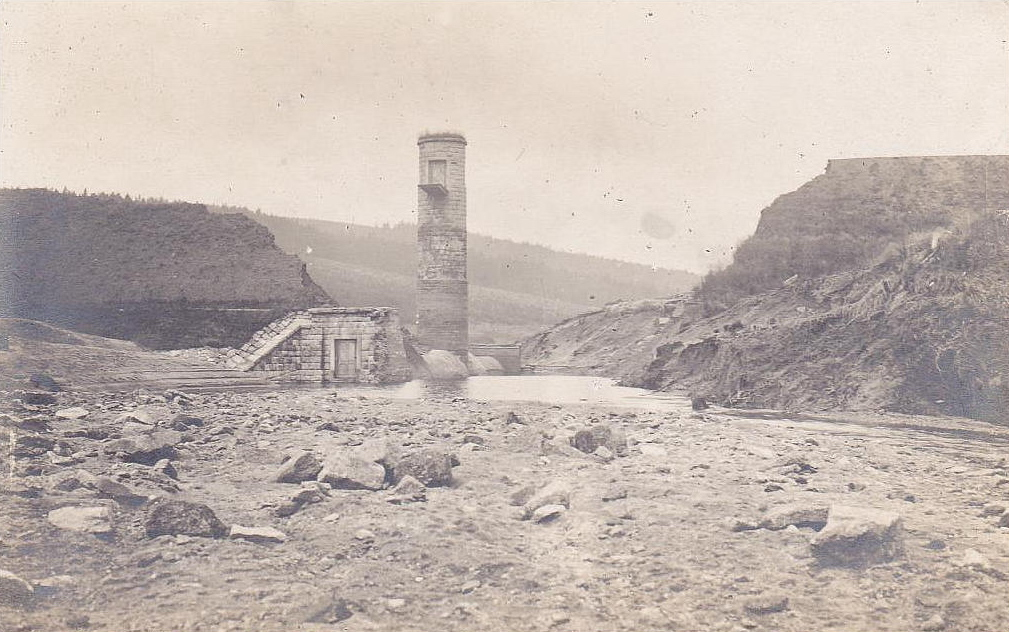
- Desná Dam shortly after collapsing.
- Interactive map of Desná Dam
- Country: Austria-Hungary (while operational); Czech Republic (present day)
- Location: Jizera Mountains
- Coordinates: 50.8009°N 15.2770°E
- Status: Destroyed (1916)
- Construction began: 1911
- Opening date: 1915

Dam and spillways
- Impounds: Bílá Desná

The Desná Dam (locally known as the Burst Dam) was a dam constructed on the Bílá Desná river in the Jizera Mountains, which are in the Liberec Region of the Czech Republic. It is known for bursting on September 18, 1916, ten months after it was built, which caused the river to flood the nearby town of Desná, killing 67 people and causing hundreds of others to lose their homes.

The dam was constructed over a five-year period and was given final approval on November 18, 1915. On September 18 the next year, at around 3:30pm, log workers noticed the first evidence of water leaking through the dam. The dam keeper ordered the reservoir to be drained, but the flow rate continued to increase. At 4:00pm, inhabitants of Desná were warned, and at 4:15pm, the dam burst with 250,000 cubic meters of water inside, which swept through the town. The number of fatalities was originally considered to be 62, though in 2016, researcher Dana Nývltová found that court documents from the time showed 65 victims, and that 2 additional victims died later in hospital.

== Aftermath ==
Ing. Karel Podhajský, the senior state supervisor of the dam's construction, committed suicide upon hearing of the dam bursting. In 1925, three other men who had led the dam's construction (Wilhelm Riedel, Ing. August Klamt and Ing. Emil Gebauer) were sentenced to prison, though they were later pardoned in 1929 by President Tomáš Masaryk. A court in 1932 acquitted those who had worked on the dam of all charges, and stated that the cause of the collapse was a geological instability that was too deep to detect during construction. A 1996 study by SG Geotechnika a.s. found that the absence of a sufficient geotechnical survey resulted in errors in the project, specifically not taking into account the great strength of the compressible layers below the dam body and their unacceptable permeability, and the excessively large hydraulic gradient of the water.

The ruins of the dam are currently a Czech Republic cultural monument and a European Union Special Area of Conservation. A plaque commemorating the tragedy's victims sits at the site.

== Gallery ==
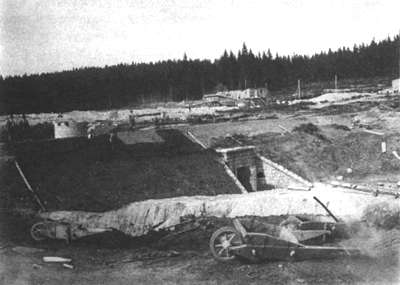
Dam under construction in 1914.

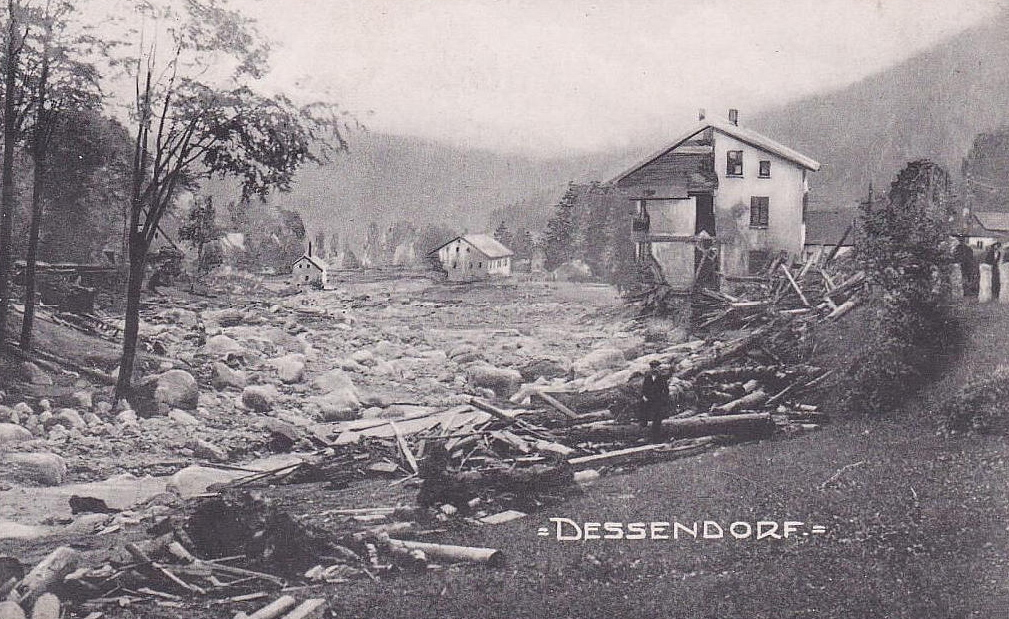
Damage in Desná (Dessendorf).

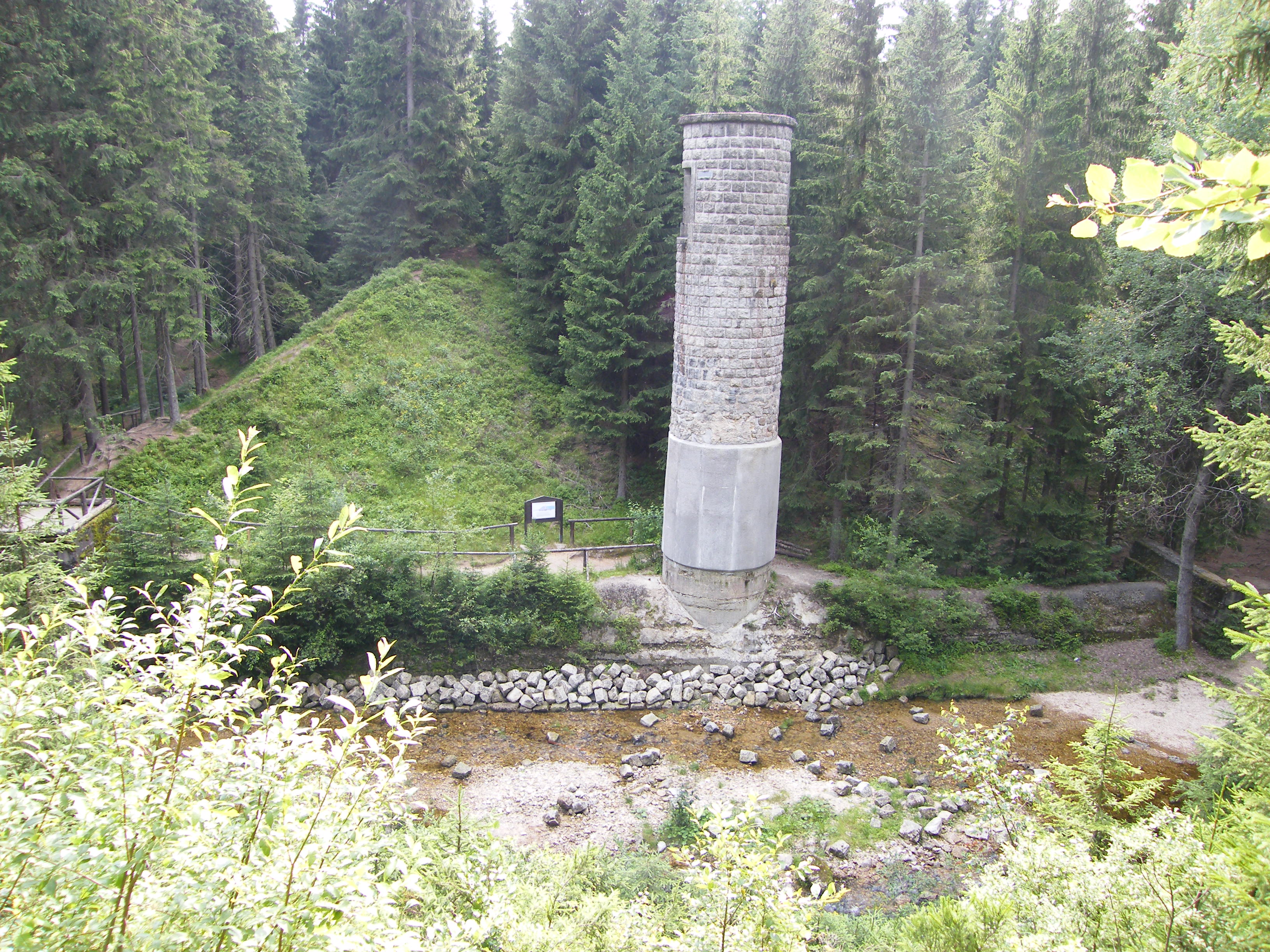
Ruins of the dam in 2009.

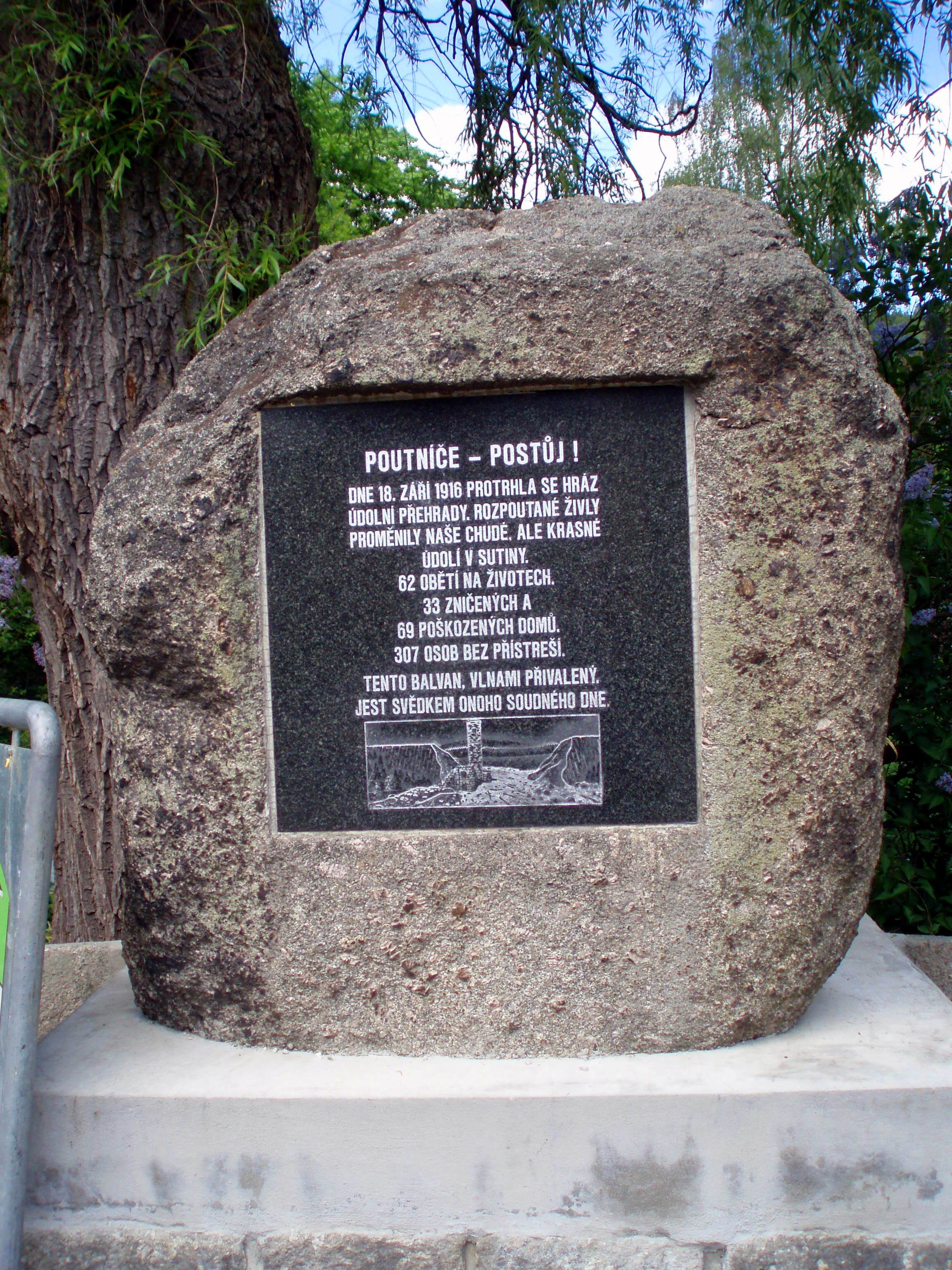
Plaque commemorating the victims.
