= Albrechtice v Jizerských horách =

- Municipality
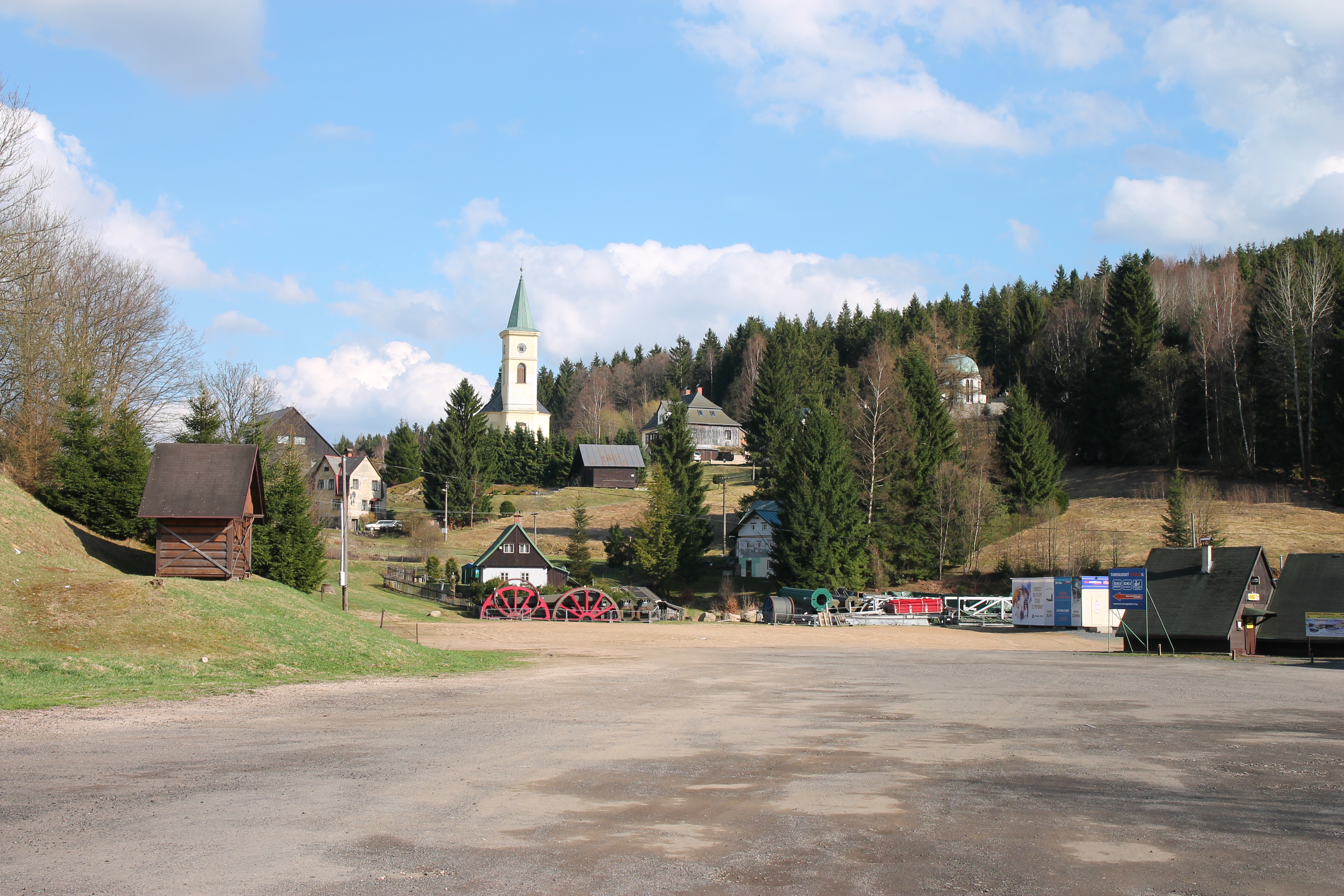
- Centre of Albrechtice v Jizerských horách

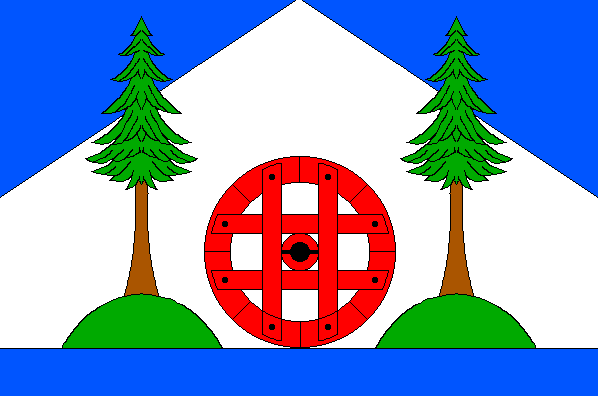
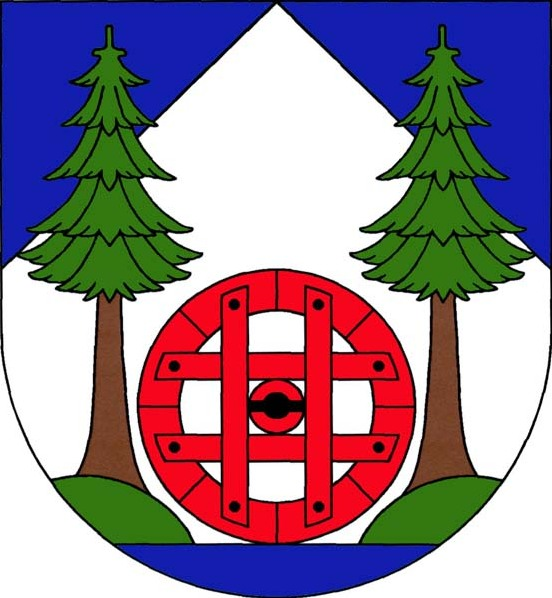
- Flag Coat of arms

- Location in the Czech Republic
- Coordinates: 50°45′44″N 15°16′33″E
- Country: Czech Republic
- Region: Liberec
- District: Jablonec nad Nisou
- Founded: 1670

Area
  - Total: 24.54 km^{2} (9.47 sq mi)
- Elevation: 610 m (2,000 ft)

Population (2026-01-01)
  - Total: 335
  - Density: 13.7/km^{2} (35.4/sq mi)
- Time zone: UTC+1 (CET)
  - Summer (DST): UTC+2 (CEST)
- Postal code: 468 43
- Website: www.albrechtice-jh.cz

Albrechtice v Jizerských horách (German: Albrechtsdorf) is a municipality and village in Jablonec nad Nisou District in the Liberec Region of the Czech Republic. It has about 300 inhabitants.

== Administrative division ==
Albrechtice v Jizerských horách consists of two municipal parts (in brackets population according to the 2021 census):

- Albrechtice v Jizerských horách (295)
- Mariánská Hora (37)

== Etymology ==
Albrechtice was named after its founder, Count Albrecht Maximilian Desfours.

== Geography ==
Albrechtice v Jizerských horách is located about 8 kilometres (5 mi) northeast of Jablonec nad Nisou and 13 km (8 mi) east of Liberec. It lies in the Jizera Mountains and the eponymous protected landscape area. The highest point is the mountain Milíře at 1,002 m (3,287 ft) above sea level. The municipality is situated on the left bank of the Kamenice River, which flows briefly along the southern municipal border. The Bílá Desná Stream flows through the woods in the northern and central parts of the municipality.

== History ==
Albrechtice was founded in 1670 by Count Albrecht Maximilian Desfours. The hamlet of Mariánská Hora was founded around 1700. The first inhabitants of the settlements engaged in logging and agriculture.

== Demographics ==
Historical population

Year	Pop.	±%
1869	2,292	—
1880	2,042	−10.9%
1890	2,209	+8.2%
1900	2,266	+2.6%
1910	2,351	+3.8%

Year	Pop.	±%
1921	1,890	−19.6%
1930	1,890	+0.0%
1950	827	−56.2%
1961	684	−17.3%
1970	494	−27.8%

Year	Pop.	±%
1980	390	−21.1%
1991	332	−14.9%
2001	329	−0.9%
2011	351	+6.7%
2021	332	−5.4%

Source: Censuses

== Transport ==
There are no railways or major roads passing through the municipality.

== Sights ==
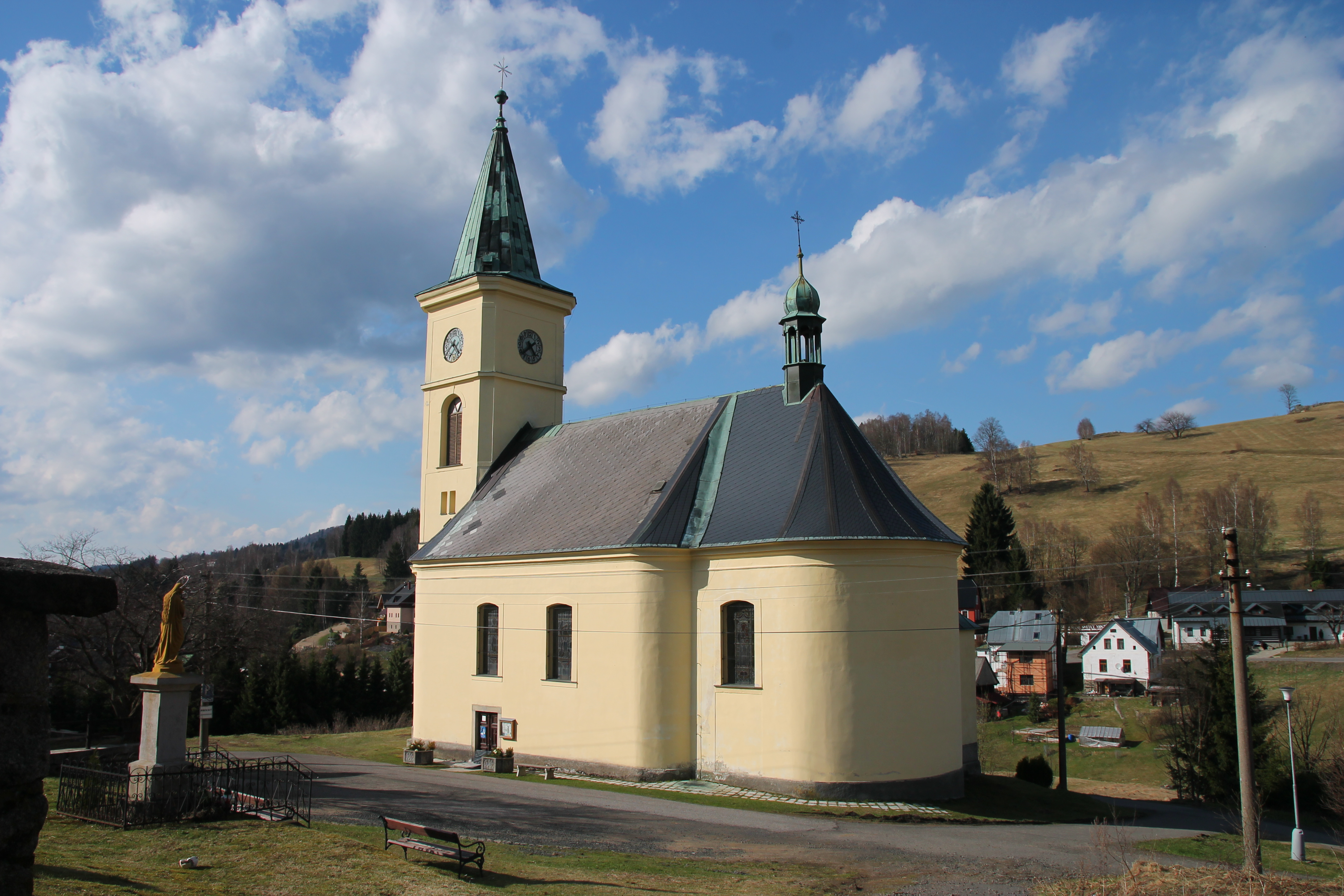
Church of Saint Francis of Paola

The main landmark of the municipality is the Church of Saint Francis of Paola. It was built in 1779–1784. The church tower was added in 1898. The cemetery next to the church includes the valuable building of Schowanek's mausoleum built in 1935.
