= Stadion FK Řezuz Děčín =

Football stadium in Děčín, Czech Republic

- Interactive map of Stadion FK Řezuz Děčín
- Location: Ve Vilách 1020/19, Děčín, Czech Republic, 405 02
- Coordinates: 50°46′26″N 14°13′21″E
- Capacity: 3,000 (350 seated)

Tenant
- FK Řezuz Děčín

Stadion FK Řezuz Děčín is a football stadium in Děčín, Czech Republic. It is the home stadium of FK Řezuz Děčín.
