= Desná (Kamenice) =

River in the Czech Republic

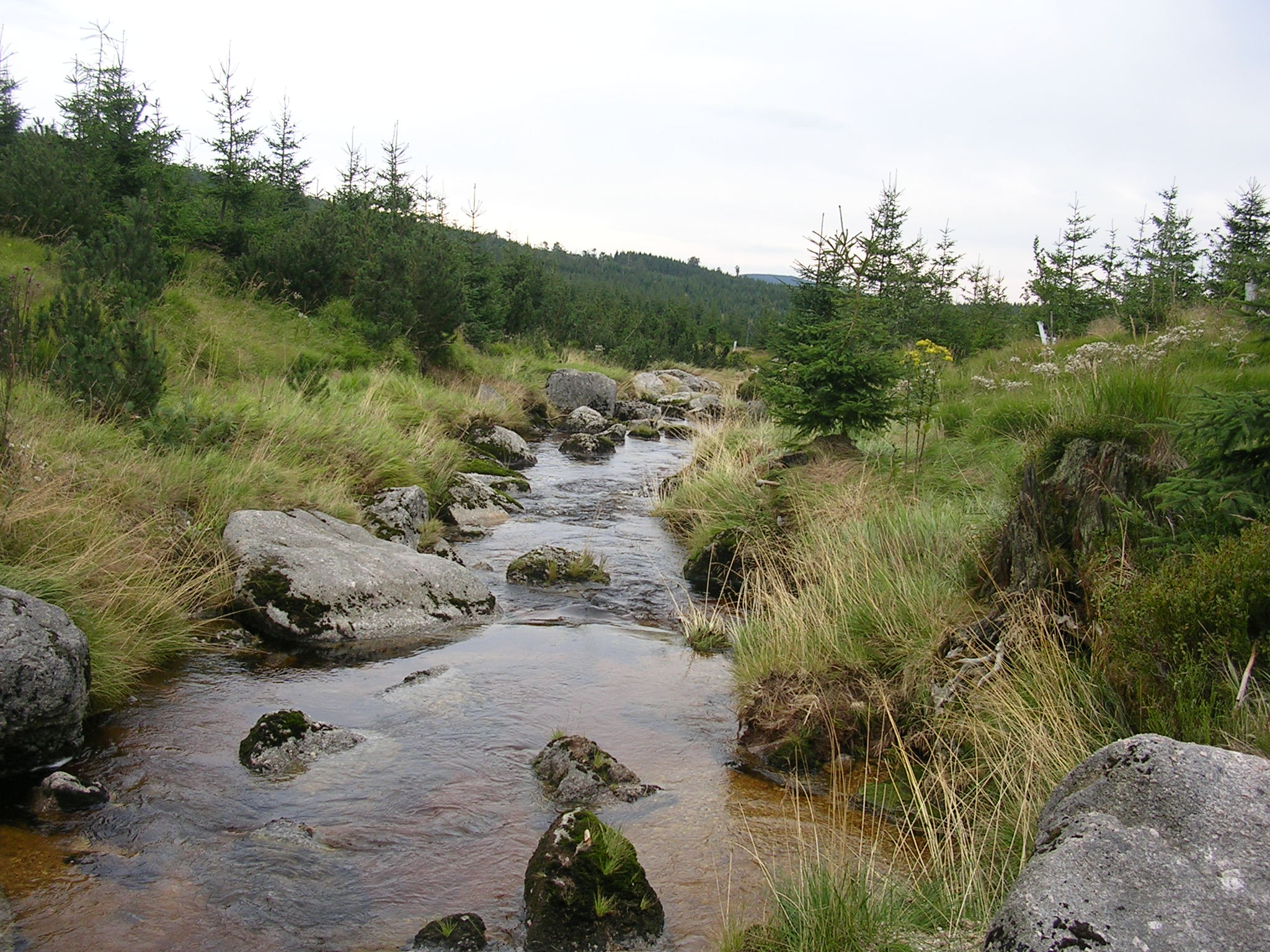
- The Bílá Desná in the woods south of Hejnice

Location
- Country: Czech Republic
- Region: Liberec

Physical characteristics
- Source: Černá Desná
  - location: Kořenov, Jizera Mountains
  - coordinates: 50°49′52″N 15°16′56″E
  - elevation: 878 m (2,881 ft)
- Mouth
  - location: Kamenice
  - coordinates: 50°44′9″N 15°18′35″E
  - elevation: 446 m (1,463 ft)
- Length: 13.6 km (8.5 mi)
- Basin size: 50.8 km^{2} (19.6 sq mi)
- Discharge
  - average: 1.41 m^{3}/s (50 cu ft/s) near estuary

Basin features
- Progression: Kamenice→ Jizera→ Elbe→ North Sea

The Desná (Czech pronunciation: [ˈdɛsnaː]; German: Desse) is a river in the Czech Republic, a left tributary of the Kamenice River. It flows through the Liberec Region. It is formed by the confluence of the Černá Desná and Bílá Desná streams. Together with the Černá Desná, which is its main source, the Desná is 13.6 km (8.5 mi) long. Without the Černá Desná, it is only 2.4 km (1.5 mi) long.

== Etymology ==
The Old Czech adjective desná meant 'right'. Because people went upstream when settling the landscape, the rivers with this name flowed as if from the right side (although they are actually left-side tributaries). The first written mention of the river (respectively Černá Desná) is from 1577. The names of the river sources Bílá Desná and Černá Desná means 'white Desná' and 'black Desná'. Names of rivers with colours in their names often referred to nature of the river bed.

== Characteristic ==
From a water management point of view, the Desná and Černá Desná are two different rivers with separate numbering of river kilometres. In a broader point of view, the Desná (as Černá Desná) originates in the territory of Kořenov in the Jizera Mountains at an elevation of 878 m (2,881 ft) and flows to Tanvald, where it enters the Kamenice River at an elevation of 446 m (1,463 ft). It is 13.6 km (8.5 mi) long. Its drainage basin has an area of 50.8 km^{2} (19.6 sq mi). The name Desná is used from the confluence of the Černá Desná with the Bílá Desná in the town on Desná and from this point to the confluence with the Kamenice, the river is 2.4 km (1.5 mi) long.

The Desná and Bílá Desná have only insignificant nameless tributaries. The only named tributary of the Černá Desná is the creek Černá říčka with a length of 4.4 km (2.7 mi). The sources of the Desná are:

Tributary	Length (km)	Side
Bílá Desná	11.6	left
Černá Desná	11.2	–

== Course ==
The Černá Desná flows through the territories of Kořenov and Desná, The Bílá Desná flows through the territories of Hejnice, Albrechtice v Jizerských horách and Desná. After their confluence in the town of Desná, the river flows only through Tanvald.

== Bodies of water ==
The Souš Reservoir was built on the Černá Desná in 1911–1915. It serves as a reservoir of drinking water for the region. The second reservoir was built in the same years on the Bílá Desná, but its dam bursted in 1916.

== Nature ==
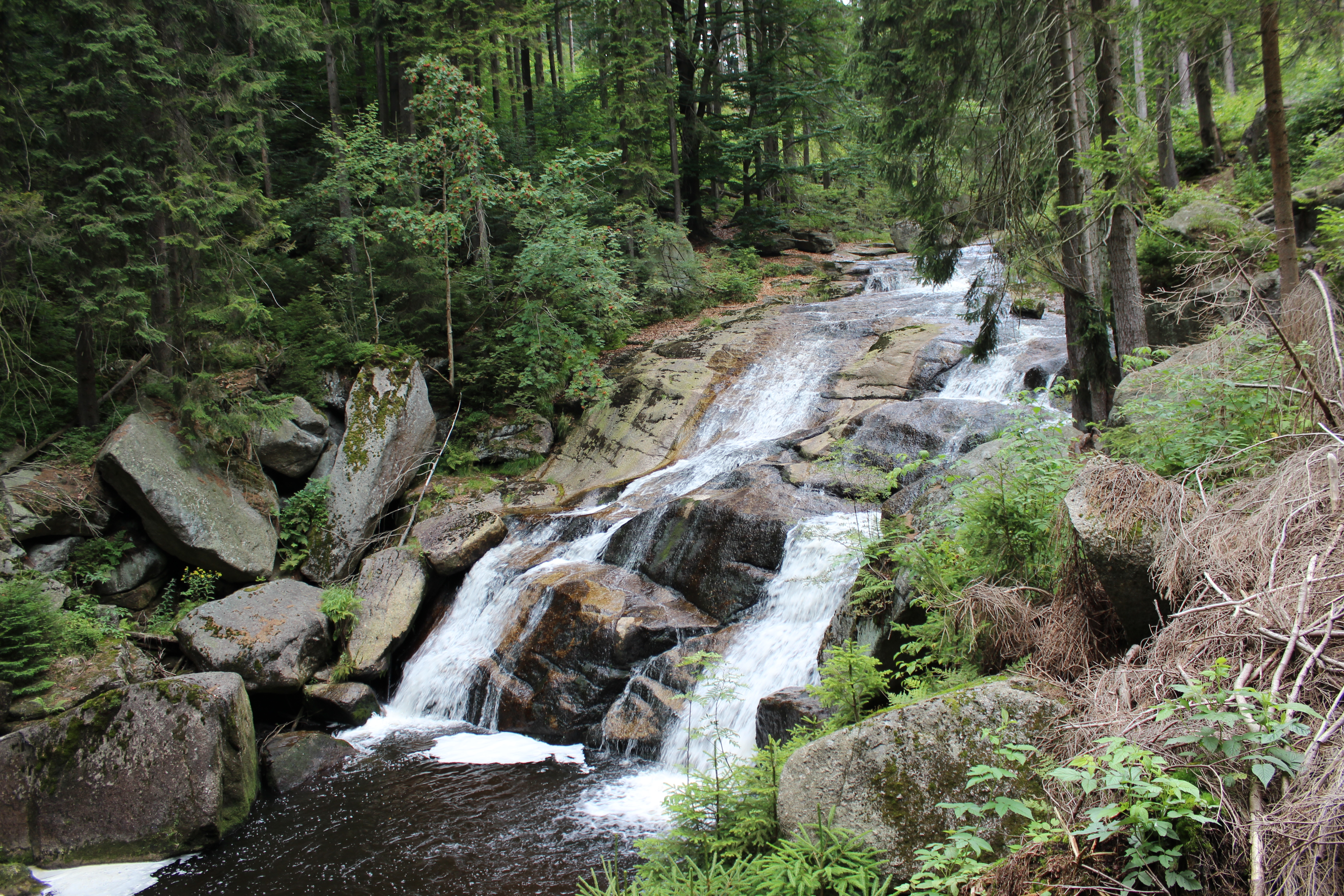
Černá Desná Nature Monument

With the exception of the last one kilometre of the river, the Desná and its sources flow through the Jizerské hory Protected Landscape Area.

A part of the river bed in the Desná town is protected as the Černá Desná Nature Monument. It has an area of 2.2 ha (5.4 acres). The object of protection is the valley of a mountain stream with a system of waterfalls, rapids, rock plates and giant's kettles, and the surrounding slope forest with endangered species of herbs.

== See also ==
- List of rivers of the Czech Republic
