= Jan Svátek =

Czech footballer

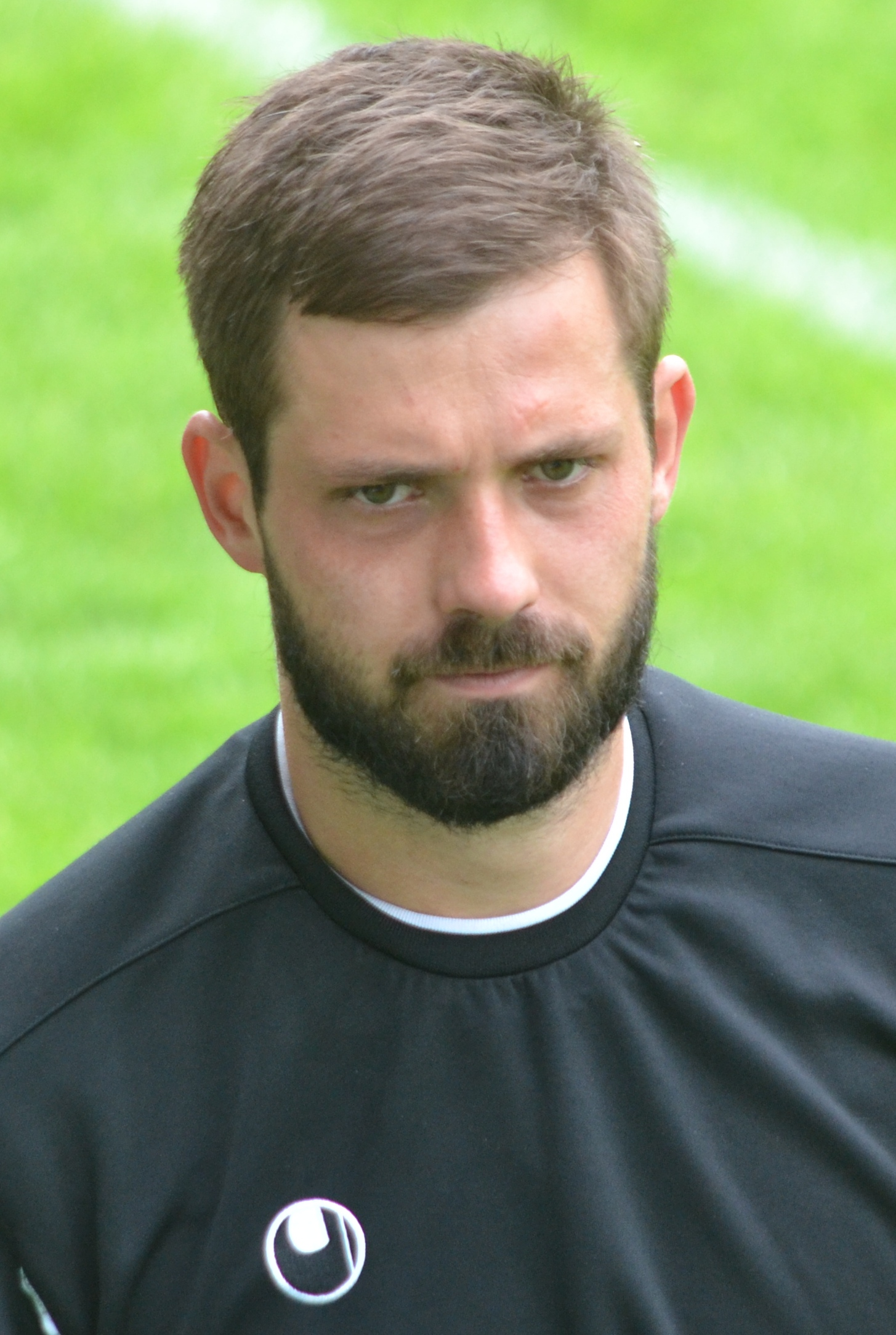
- Jan Svátek (2015)

Personal information
- Date of birth: 24 May 1983 (age 43)
- Place of birth: Prague, Czechoslovakia
- Height: 1.83 m (6 ft 0 in)
- Position: Striker

Team information
- Current team: FK Jablonec 97
- Number: 23

Senior career*
Years	Team	Apps	(Gls)
2005	SFC Opava	13	(2)
2005–2006	FC Viktoria Plzeň	7	(0)
2006	FK Jablonec 97	12	(1)
2006–2007	SK Dynamo České Budějovice	16	(4)
2007–2008	FK Jablonec 97	25	(3)
2008–2009	SK Dynamo České Budějovice	38	(2)
2010–present	→ Vlašim (loan)		
- * Club domestic league appearances and goals as of 15 February 2010

Jan Svátek (born 24 May 1983 in Prague) is a Czech footballer (striker) playing currently for FK Jablonec 97.
