= FK Řezuz Děčín =

- Full name: FK Řezuz Děčín
- Nickname: Řezníky
- Founded: 1999
- Ground: Stadion FK Řezuz Děčín
- Capacity: 3,000 (350 seated)
- Chairman: Vladimír Šoltys
- Manager: Vladimír Vašák
- 2010–11: Divize B, 16th (relegated)

FK Řezuz Děčín is a Czech football club located in Děčín.

== League and cup history ==
Season	League Contested	Level	Pld	W	D	L	GF	GA	GD	Pts	League Position	Cup
2004–05	Czech 5. Liga; Krajský přebor – Ústecký kraj	5	30	14	7	9	59	46	+13	49	4th of 16	–
2005–06	Czech 5. Liga; Krajský přebor – Ústecký kraj	5	30	23	5	2	89	37	+52	74	1st of 16; Promoted	–
2006–07	Czech Fourth Division; Divize B	4	30	11	3	16	50	61	−11	36	13th of 16; Relegated	R1
2007–08	Czech 5. Liga; Krajský přebor – Ústecký kraj	5	30	23	3	4	97	22	+75	72	1st of 16; Promoted	–
2008–09	Czech Fourth Division; Divize B	4	30	14	6	10	56	50	+6	48	5th of 16	R2
2009–10	Czech Fourth Division; Divize B	4	30	11	8	11	41	50	-9	41	8th of 16	R1
2010–11	Czech Fourth Division; Divize B	4	30	2	2	26	28	91	−63	8	16th of 16; Relegated	R1

Last Updated: 19 June 2011.
P = Position; Pld = Matches played; W = Matches won; D = Matches drawn; L = Matches lost; GF = Goals for; GA = Goals against; GD = Goal difference; Pts = Points;
