= Dešná (Zlín District) =

- Municipality
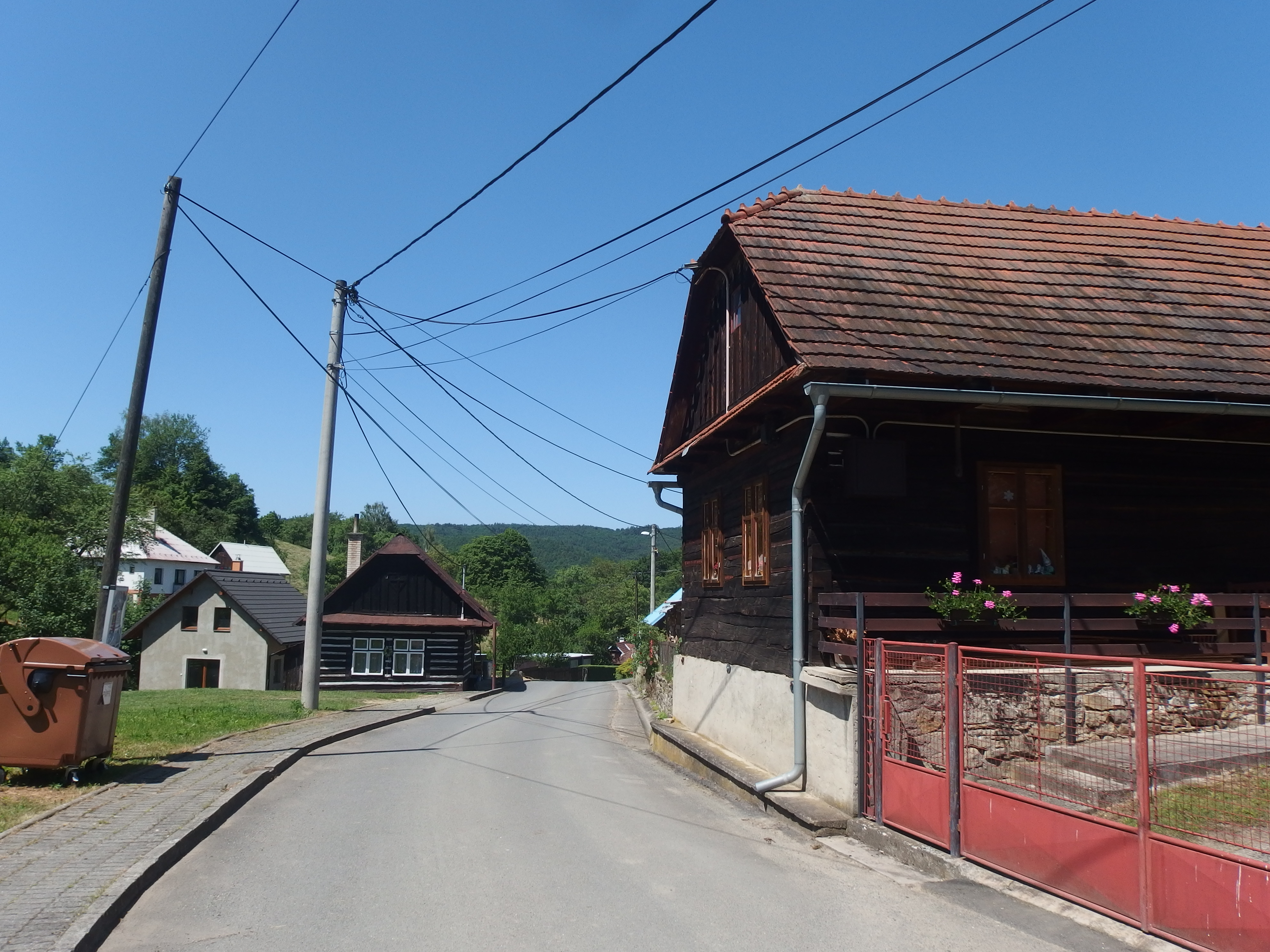
- Main street

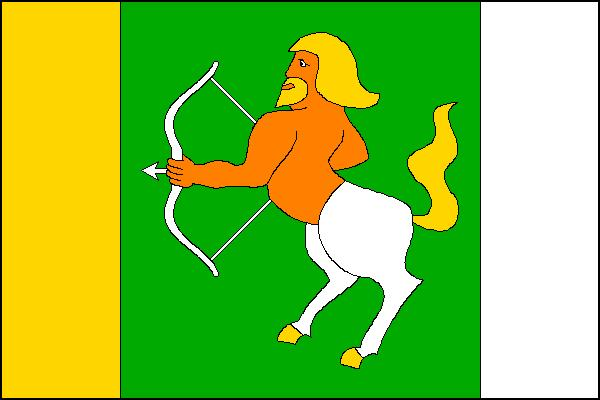
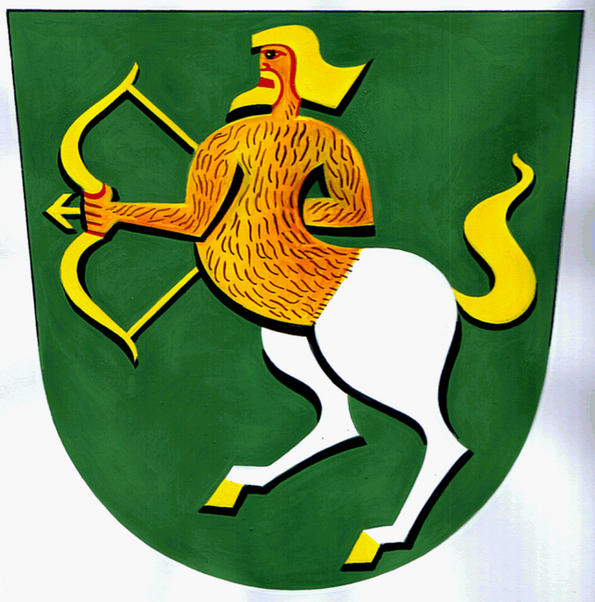
- Flag Coat of arms

- Location in the Czech Republic
- Coordinates: 49°16′0″N 17°50′45″E
- Country: Czech Republic
- Region: Zlín
- District: Zlín
- First mentioned: 1373

Area
  - Total: 2.16 km^{2} (0.83 sq mi)
- Elevation: 360 m (1,180 ft)

Population (2026-01-01)
  - Total: 208
  - Density: 96.3/km^{2} (249/sq mi)
- Time zone: UTC+1 (CET)
  - Summer (DST): UTC+2 (CEST)
- Postal code: 763 15
- Website: desnauzlina.cz

Dešná is a municipality and village in Zlín District in the Zlín Region of the Czech Republic. It has about 200 inhabitants.

Dešná lies approximately 15 kilometres (9 mi) east of Zlín and 264 km (164 mi) east of Prague.

== Demographics ==
Historical population
Year	Pop.	±%
1869	141	—
1880	117	−17.0%
1890	136	+16.2%
1900	136	+0.0%
1910	148	+8.8%
1921	135	−8.8%
1930	155	+14.8%
1950	165	+6.5%
1961	176	+6.7%
1970	180	+2.3%
1980	164	−8.9%
1991	145	−11.6%
2001	195	+34.5%
2011	208	+6.7%
2021	190	−8.7%
Source: Censuses
