= Desná (Jablonec nad Nisou District) =

- Town
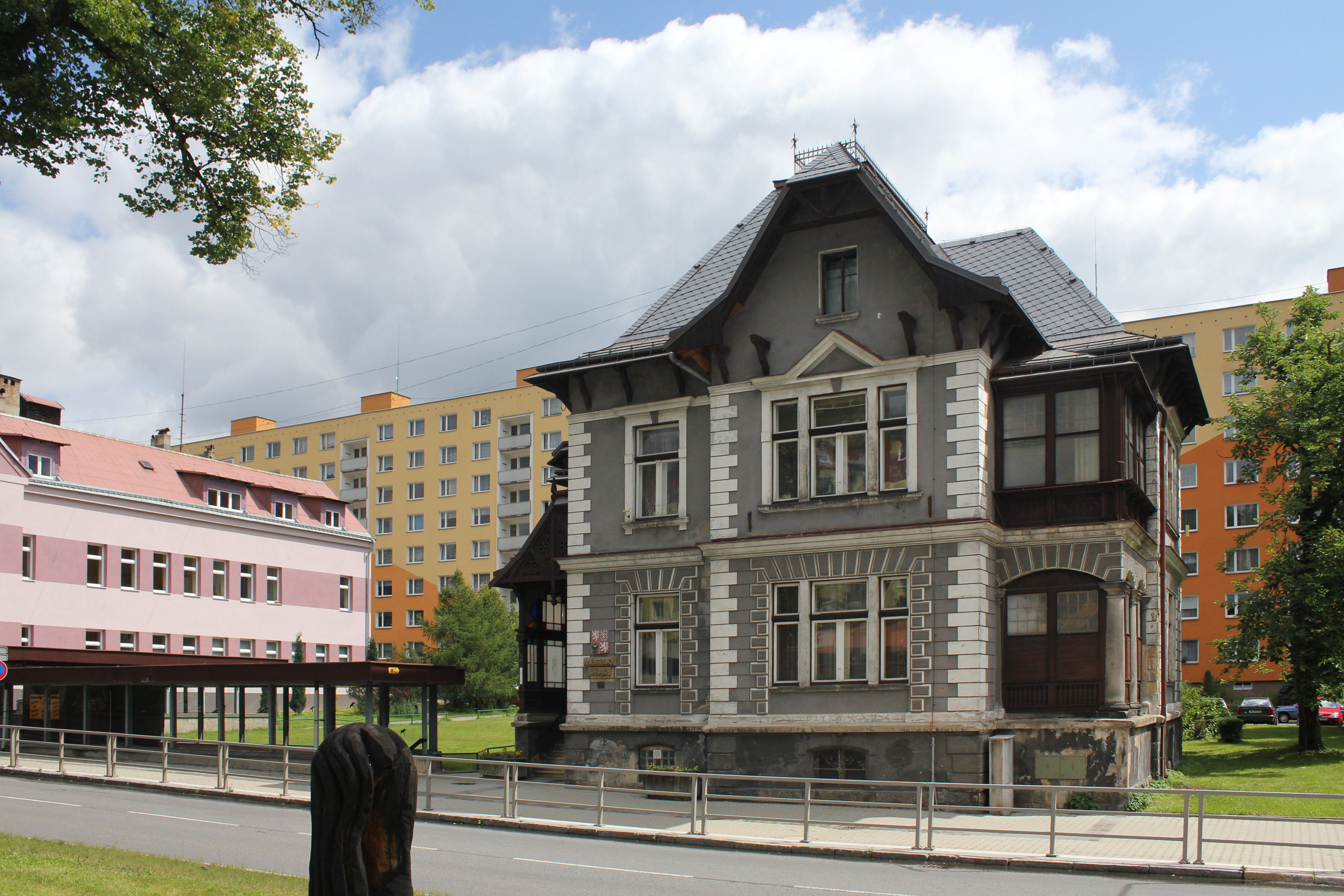
- Town hall

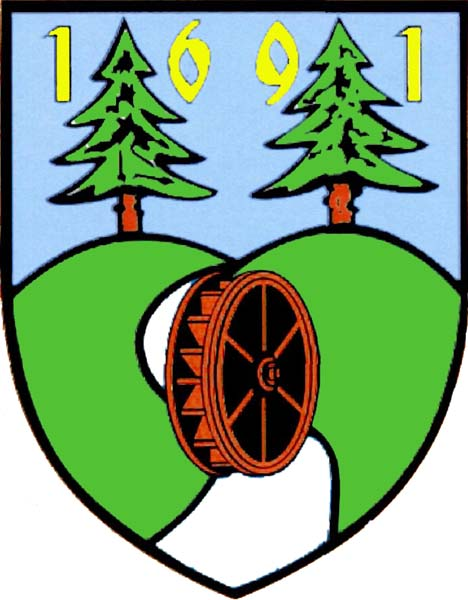
- Flag Coat of arms

- Location in the Czech Republic
- Coordinates: 50°45′35″N 15°18′10″E
- Country: Czech Republic
- Region: Liberec
- District: Jablonec nad Nisou
- Founded: 1691

Government
  - Mayor: Jaroslav Kořínek

Area
  - Total: 12.58 km^{2} (4.86 sq mi)
- Elevation: 490 m (1,610 ft)

Population (2026-01-01)
  - Total: 2,986
  - Density: 237.4/km^{2} (614.8/sq mi)
- Time zone: UTC+1 (CET)
  - Summer (DST): UTC+2 (CEST)
- Postal code: 468 61
- Website: mesto-desna.cz

Desná (Czech pronunciation: [ˈdɛsnaː]; German: Dessendorf) is a town in Jablonec nad Nisou District in the Liberec Region of the Czech Republic. It has about 3,000 inhabitants. The town is located in the Jizera Mountains, at the confluence of the Černá Desná and Bílá Desná streams, which form the Desná River. Desná was founded in 1691 and became a town in 1968.

== Administrative division ==
Desná consists of three municipal parts (in brackets population according to the 2021 census):

- Desná I (912)
- Desná II (1,462)
- Desná III (589)

== Etymology ==
Desná supposed to be named Desfoursdorf ("Desfours' village") after its founder, Count Maximilian Desfours II. However the name Dessendorf was adopted instead (referring to the Desná River). The Czech name Desná only began to be used in the first half of the 20th century.

== Geography ==
Desná is located about 9 kilometres (6 mi) east of Jablonec nad Nisou. It lies in the Jizera Mountains. The highest point is the mountain Novina at 804 m (2,638 ft) above sea level. The town is situated at the confluence of the Černá Desná and Bílá Desná streams, which form the Desná River. The Souš Reservoir, built on the Černá Desná, is located in the northern part of the municipal territory.

== History ==
Desná was founded by Count Maximilian Desfours II in 1691. In 1913, Desná was promoted to a market town. In 1949, eleven hamlets and their parts were joined to Desná and the municipality was established in its current form. In 1968, it became a town.

== Demographics ==
Historical population

| Year | Pop. | ±% |
|---|---|---|
| 1869 | 1,270 | — |
| 1880 | 1,807 | +42.3% |
| 1890 | 2,123 | +17.5% |
| 1900 | 2,447 | +15.3% |
| 1910 | 2,347 | −4.1% |

| Year | Pop. | ±% |
|---|---|---|
| 1921 | 1,681 | −28.4% |
| 1930 | 1,740 | +3.5% |
| 1950 | 3,516 | +102.1% |
| 1961 | 3,697 | +5.1% |
| 1970 | 3,436 | −7.1% |

| Year | Pop. | ±% |
|---|---|---|
| 1980 | 3,372 | −1.9% |
| 1991 | 3,811 | +13.0% |
| 2001 | 3,549 | −6.9% |
| 2011 | 3,130 | −11.8% |
| 2021 | 2,963 | −5.3% |

Source: Censuses

== Transport ==
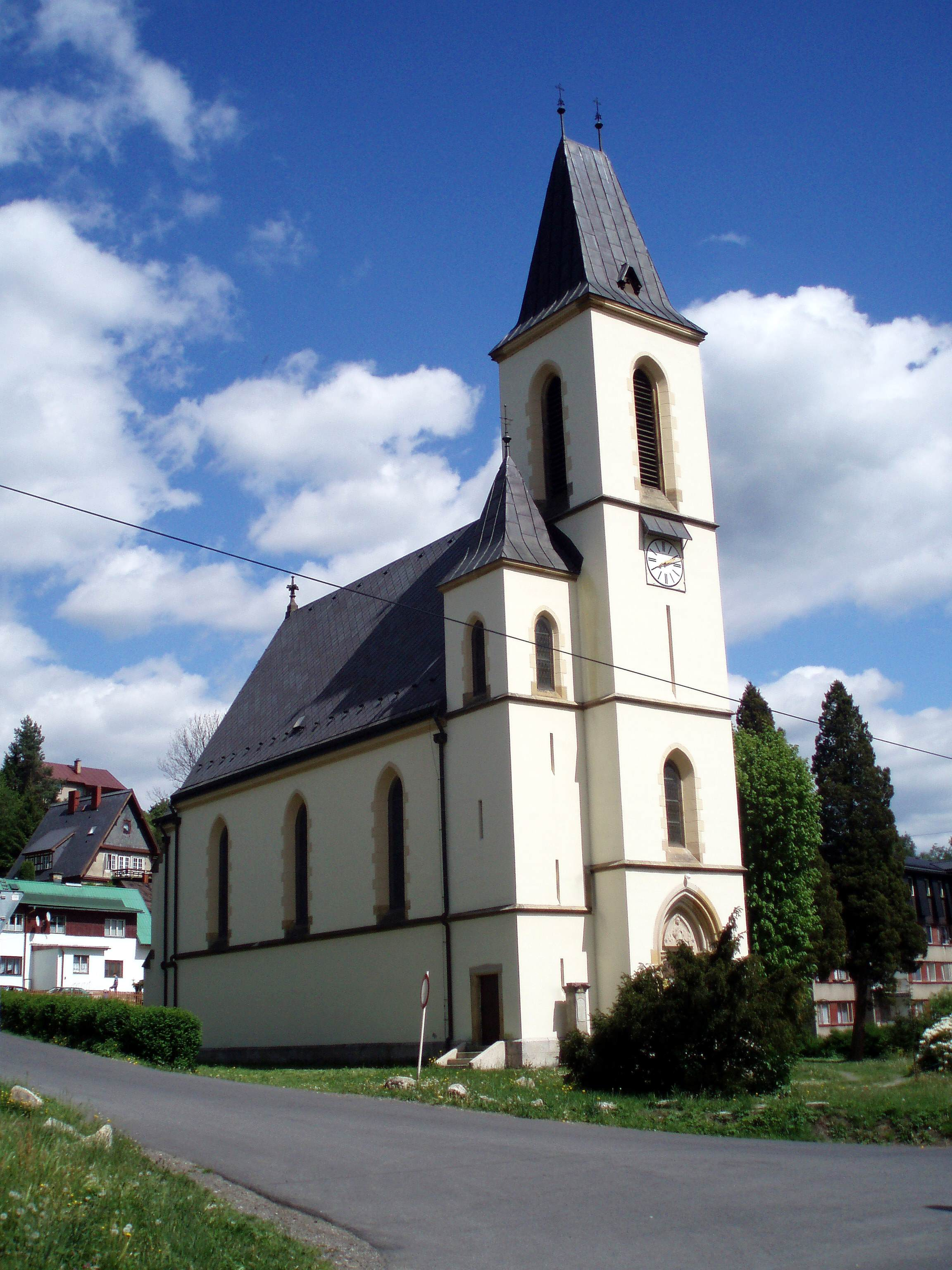
Church of the Assumption of the Virgin Mary

Desná is located on the railway line Liberec–Szklarska Poręba. The territory is served by four train stations and stops: Desná, Desná-Riedlova vila, Dolní Polubný and Desná-Pustinská.

== Sport ==
The town is home to the amateur football club TJ Desná.

== Sights ==
The main landmark of the town is the Church of the Assumption of the Virgin Mary. It was built in the neo-Gothic style in 1903.

== Notable people ==
- Tomáš Goder (born 1974), ski jumper

== Twin towns – sister cities ==
Desná is twinned with:

- Malschwitz, Germany
- Podgórzyn, Poland
