= 2010–11 FC Viktoria Plzeň season =

Viktoria Plzeň
2010–11 season
- Chairman: (Czech Republic) Ladislav Valášek
- Manager: (Czech Republic) Pavel Vrba
- Stadium: Stadion města Plzně
- Czech First League: 1st
- CMFS Cup: Quarter-finals
- Czech Supercup: Runners-up
- UEFA Europa League: Third qualifying round
- Top goalscorer: Daniel Kolář (13)
- Highest home attendance: 7,500 v Sparta Prague (12 March 2011)
- Lowest home attendance: 4,819 v Olomouc (18 July 2010)
- Average home league attendance: 6,415
Home colours	Away colours

The 2010–11 season was Viktoria Plzeň's sixth consecutive season in the Czech First League. Having won the Czech Cup, they entered the competition as defending champions. They also took part in the inaugural Czech Supercup and played in the UEFA Europa League for the first time in their history.

Plzeň started the season by losing to AC Sparta Prague by a 1–0 scoreline in the first ever Czech Supercup. Later in July the club played its first ever fixture in the Europa League, drawing 1–1 with Turkish side Beşiktaş in the third qualifying round of the competition. Their European run was to be short-lived as the Turkish club won 3–0 in the return leg, sending Plzeň out of the competition, 4–1 on aggregate.

Despite being the defending champions of the Czech Cup, the club could only reach the quarter final stage, where they suffered a 4–2 aggregate loss to fellow Gambrinus liga side Mladá Boleslav. In the Czech First League, the club celebrated their first title as they won the league by a single point from second-placed Sparta Prague.

== Czech First League ==
=== Results summary ===
Overall								Home						Away					
Pld	W	D	L	GF	GA	GD	Pts	W	D	L	GF	GA	GD	W	D	L	GF	GA	GD
30	21	6	3	70	28	+42	69	11	4	0	39	15	+24	10	2	3	31	13	+18

Source: Gambrinus liga

=== League table ===
Pos	Team	Pld	W	D	L	GF	GA	GD	Pts	Qualification or relegation
1	Viktoria Plzeň (C)	30	21	6	3	70	28	+42	69	Qualification for Champions League second qualifying round
2	Sparta Prague	30	22	2	6	54	21	+33	68	Qualification for Europa League third qualifying round
3	Jablonec	30	17	7	6	65	34	+31	58	Qualification for Europa League second qualifying round
4	Sigma Olomouc	30	14	5	11	47	29	+18	47	
5	Mladá Boleslav	30	13	7	10	49	40	+9	46	Qualification for Europa League third qualifying round (Note: Mladá Boleslav won the 2010–11 Czech Cup and qualified for the third qualifying round of the UEFA Europa League.)

Source: Fortuna liga
Rules for classification: 1) points; 2) head-to-head points; 3) head-to-head goal difference; 4) head-to-head goals scored; 5) goal difference; 6) number of goals scored.
(C) Champions

=== Results by round ===
Round	1	2	3	4	5	6	7	8	9	10	11	12	13	14	15	16	17	18	19	20	21	22	23	24	25	26	27	28	29	30
Ground	H	A	H	A	H	A	A	H	A	H	A	H	A	H	A	H	A	H	A	H	H	A	H	A	H	A	H	A	H	A
Result	D	W	W	W	W	W	W	W	W	W	W	W	L	W	W	D	L	W	D	W	W	W	D	W	D	D	W	W	W	L
Position	5	3	1	1	1	1	1	1	1	1	1	1	1	1	1	1	1	1	1	1	1	1	1	1	1	1	1	1	1	1

Source: Matches
A = Away; H = Home; W = Win; D = Draw; L = Loss

=== Matches ===
Win Draw Loss

==== July ====
18 July 2010 Round 1	Plzeň	2–2	Olomouc	Plzeň
17:00	Horváth 45' (pen.); Janotka 80' (o.g.); Rezek (yellow card) 62'	Report	64' Šultes; 79' (yellow card) 63' Janotka; (yellow card) 18' Petr	Stadium: Stadion města Plzně; Attendance: 4,819; Referee: D. Drábek

24 July 2010 Round 2	Liberec	2–3	Plzeň	Liberec
18:15	Kerič 19'; Bosančić 71' (pen.); Holeňák (yellow card) 25'; Nezmar (yellow card) 41'; Papoušek (yellow card) 56'; Bičík (yellow card) 64'; Štajner (yellow card) 64'; Liška (yellow card) 90'	Report	1' 64' Rezek; 3' Limberský; (yellow card) 21' Jiráček; (yellow card) 33' Rajtoral; (yellow card) 41' Bystroň; (yellow card) 66' Petržela; (yellow card) 90' Rada	Stadium: Stadion u Nisy; Attendance: 4,785; Referee: T. Kocourek

==== August ====
1 August 2010 Round 3	Plzeň	2–1	Bohemians 1905	Plzeň
17:00	Kolář 44'; Horváth 69'	Report	83' (yellow card) 68' Nešpor; (yellow card) 57' Štohanzl	Stadium: Stadion města Plzně; Attendance: 5,228; Referee: P. Franěk

9 August 2010 Round 4	Hradec Králové	0–3	Plzeň	Hradec Králové
18:00	Kasálek (yellow card) 55'; Janoušek (yellow card) 63'; Fischer (yellow card) 77'	Report	38' Rada; 56' 83' (pen.) Rezek; (yellow card) 65' Jiráček	Stadium: Všesportovní stadion Attendance: 6,000; Referee: R. Matějek

15 August 2010 Round 5	Plzeň	3–0	Slovácko	Plzeň
17:00	Horváth 10'; Rezek 58'; Kolář 62'	Report	(yellow card) 24' Hlúpik; (yellow card) 73' Kordula; (yellow card) 77' Košút	Stadium: Stadion města Plzně; Attendance: 5,421; Referee: L. Kovařík

21 August 2010 Round 6	Sparta	0–1	Plzeň	Prague
18:15	Adiaba (yellow card) 70'	Report	60' Jiráček; (yellow card) 74' Pavlík; (yellow card) 79' Petržela; (yellow card) 90' Bystroň; (yellow card) 90' Limberský	Stadium: Generali Arena; Attendance: 7,943; Referee: R. Hrubeš

29 August 2010 Round 7	České Budějovice	0–3	Plzeň	České Budějovice
17:00	Černák (yellow card) 16'; Kučera (yellow card) 35'; Lengyel (yellow card) 54'; Ondrášek (yellow card) 66' (yellow-red card) 78'	Report	50' 72' Kolář; 57' Rezek; (yellow card) 84' Pavlík; (yellow card) 90' Bystroň	Stadium: Stadion Střelecký ostrov Attendance: 4,082; Referee: M. Zelinka

==== September ====
12 September 2010 Round 8	Plzeň	7–0	Ústí nad Labem	Plzeň
17:00	Kolář 4' 58'; Bakoš 27'; Petržela 34'; Horváth 42' (pen.); Limberský 49'; Navrátil 67'	Report	(yellow card) 42' Valenta	Stadium: Stadion města Plzně; Attendance: 7,425; Referee: J. Bílek

17 September 2010 Round 9	Jablonec	1–2	Plzeň	Jablonec nad Nisou
18:15	Lafata 83'; Jablonský (yellow card) 20'; Jarolím (yellow card) 67'; Pavlík (yellow card) 70'; Pekhart (yellow card) 75'; Vošahlík (yellow card) 78'; Kovařík (yellow card) 88'	Report	18' Kolář; 65' Bakoš; (yellow card) 20' Petržela; (yellow card) 73' Rada	Stadium: Chance Arena; Attendance: 3,512; Referee: D. Drábek

26 September 2010 Round 10	Plzeň	2–1	Příbram	Plzeň
17:00	Jiráček 19' (yellow card) 56'; Střihavka 82'; Limberský (yellow card) 70'; Navrátil (yellow card) 78'	Report	4' (o.g.) Limberský; (yellow card) 15' Štochl; (yellow card) 27' Plašil; (yellow card) 55' (yellow-red card) 75' Videgla; (yellow card) 59' Hruška; (yellow card) 87' Pleško	Stadium: Stadion města Plzně; Attendance: 7,045; Referee: T. Adámek

==== October ====
1 October 2010 Round 11	Slavia	0–1	Plzeň	Prague
19:30	Hubáček (yellow card) 29'; Belaid (yellow card) 38'; Vyhnal (yellow card) 57'; Kisel (yellow card) 70'	Report	17' (pen.) Rezek; (yellow card) 32' Navrátil; (yellow card) 40' Rajtoral; (yellow card) 45' Bakoš	Stadium: Synot Tip Arena; Attendance: 6,133; Referee: P. Franěk

17 October 2010 Round 12	Plzeň	4–1	Brno	Plzeň
15:00	Petržela 16'; Rezek 27' (pen.) 71' (yellow card) 68'; Kolář 79' (yellow card) 73'	Report	40' Michálek; (yellow card) 10' Dostálek; (yellow card) 27' Hudec; (yellow card) 49' Hamouz; (yellow card) 70' Trousil	Stadium: Stadion města Plzně; Attendance: 6,138; Referee: P. Mikel

23 October 2010 Round 13	Mladá Boleslav	4–3	Plzeň	Mladá Boleslav
18:20	Chramosta 20'; Rolko 32'; Táborský 59' (pen.); Dimitrovski 70' (yellow card) 89'; Procházka (yellow card) 42'; Fabián (yellow card) 90'	Report	38' Petržela; 61' (yellow card) 49' Rada; 86' (yellow card) 41' Rajtoral; (yellow card) 58' Pavlík; (yellow card) 88' Brezinský; (yellow card) 90' Horváth	Stadium: Městský stadion (Mladá Boleslav); Attendance: 3,751; Referee: M. Zelinka

29 October 2010 Round 14	Plzeň	4–2	Teplice	Plzeň
18:15	Petržela 8' 81' (yellow card) 35'; Bystroň 33'; Rezek 57'; Horváth (yellow card) 38'; Pavlík (yellow card) 90'	Report	59' (yellow card) 47' Matula; 84' Vondrášek; (yellow card) 41' Čajić	Stadium: Stadion města Plzně; Attendance: 6,657; Referee: J. Bílek

==== November ====
1 November 2010 Round 15	Ostrava	0–2	Plzeň	Ostrava
19:30	Marek (yellow card) 36'; Bolf (yellow card) 55'	Report	17' Rajtoral; 78' Kolář	Stadium: Bazaly; Attendance: 4,780; Referee: D. Možíš

13 November 2010 Round 16	Plzeň	1–1	Liberec	Plzeň
18:20	Horváth 20' (pen.) (yellow card) 34'; Navrátil (yellow card) 6' (yellow-red card) 90'; Limberský (yellow card) 45'	Report	80' (yellow card) 69' Kerić; (yellow card) 33' Vácha; (yellow card) 50' Kelić; (yellow card) 87' Nezmar; (yellow card) 88' Fleišman	Stadium: Stadion města Plzně; Attendance: 6,859; Referee: J. Adam

19 November 2010 Round 17	Bohemians 1905	1–0	Plzeň	Prague
19:30	Trubila 4'; Štohanzl (yellow card) 10'; Cseh (yellow card) 21'; Ibragimov (yellow card) 75'	Report	(yellow card) 63' Kolář; (yellow card) 87' Rajtoral	Stadium: Ďolíček; Attendance: 3,578; Referee: R. Příhoda

==== February ====
26 February 2011 Round 18	Plzeň	2–1	Hradec Králové	Plzeň
17:20	Bakoš 73'; Kolář 80'	Report	90' Hochmeister	Stadium: Stadion města Plzně; Attendance: 5,488; Referee: R. Hrubeš

==== March ====
5 March 2011 Round 19	Slovácko	2–2	Plzeň	Uherské Hradiště
17:20	Mezlík 34'; Valenta 67' (yellow card) 65'; Fujerik (yellow card) 49'; Kordula (yellow card) 59'	Report	1' Bakoš; 83' (yellow card) 62' Jiráček; (yellow card) 33' Rajtoral	Stadium: Městský fotbalový stadion Miroslava Valenty; Attendance: 5,012; Referee: P. Mikel

12 March 2011 Round 20	Plzeň	1–0	Sparta	Plzeň
17:20	Horváth 16' (yellow card) 55'; Trapp (yellow card) 30'; Rezek (yellow card) 81'; Pavlík (yellow card) 90'	Report	(yellow card) 30' Kadlec; (yellow card) 39' Abena; (yellow card) 54' Podaný; (yellow card) 60' Pamić; (yellow card) 63' Vacek; (yellow card) 79' Řepka	Stadium: Stadion města Plzně; Attendance: 7,500; Referee: M. Zelinka

18 March 2011 Round 21	Plzeň	2–1	České Budějovice	Plzeň
20:15	Ďuriš 43'; Bakoš 67'; Neuwirth (yellow card) 81'; Limberský (yellow card) 84'	Report	57' (yellow card) 72' Nitrianský; (yellow card) 90' Mezlík	Stadium: Stadion města Plzně; Attendance: 5,670; Referee: J. Jech

==== April ====
3 April 2011 Round 22	Ústí nad Labem	0–5	Plzeň	Teplice
17:00	Bakoš 3' 40'; Petržela 45'; Bystroň 83'; Ďuriš 90'	Report		Stadium: Na Stínadlech; Attendance: 2,114; Referee: T. Adámek

8 April 2011 Round 23	Plzeň	1–1	Jablonec	Plzeň
20:15	Rezek 55'; Bakoš (yellow card) 22'; Rajtoral (yellow card) 50'; Petržela (yellow card) 90'	Report	62' Lafata; (yellow card) 10' Vošahlík; (yellow card) 48' (yellow-red card) 53' Beneš; (yellow card) 59' Piták; (yellow card) 74' Eliáš	Stadium: Stadion města Plzně; Attendance: 7,425; Referee: D. Drábek

15 April 2011 Round 24	Příbram	0–3	Plzeň	Příbram
20:15	Pilík (yellow card) 36'; Tarczal (yellow card) 64'	Report	16' (yellow card) 65' Horváth; 68' Jiráček; 83' Ďuriš	Stadium: Na Litavce; Attendance: 3,287; Referee: R. Matějek

25 April 2011 Round 25	Plzeň	2–2	Slavia	Plzeň
18:30	Kolář 21'; Ševínský 28'; Limberský (yellow card) 62'; Jiráček (yellow card) 64'	Report	88' (yellow card) 25' Kisel; 90' Černý; (yellow card) 56' Trubila	Stadium: Stadion města Plzně; Attendance: 7,140; Referee: L. Kovařík

30 April 2011 Round 26	Brno	1–1	Plzeň	Brno
17:20	Rabušic 56'; Střeštík (yellow card) 10'; Přerovský (yellow card) 17'; Dostálek (yellow card) 29'; Simerský (yellow card) 59'; Šamánek (red card) 68'; Husár (yellow card) 80'; Bureš (yellow card) 90'	Report	28' Petržela; (yellow card) 66' Bakoš; (yellow card) 78' Ďuriš; (yellow card) 86' Fillo	Stadium: Městský fotbalový stadion Srbská; Attendance: 1,862; Referee: P. Mikel

==== May ====
7 May 2011 Round 27	Plzeň	3–1	Mladá Boleslav	Plzeň
17:20	Kolář 16'; Bakoš 31' (yellow card) 14'; Rajtoral 63'; Horváth (yellow card) 6' (yellow-red card) 86'; Trapp (yellow card) 8'; Ševínský (yellow card) 69'	Report	74' Řezníček; (yellow card) 3' Dimoutsos; (yellow card) 90' Šćuk	Stadium: Stadion města Plzně; Attendance: 6,311; Referee: R. Příhoda

14 May 2011 Round 28	Teplice	0–1	Plzeň	Teplice
18:20	Rosa (yellow card) 19'; Čajić (yellow card) 52'; Matula (yellow card) 57'; Ljevaković (yellow card) 73'	Report	10' (yellow card) 85' Kolář; (yellow card) 85' Trapp	Stadium: Na Stínadlech; Attendance: 4,750; Referee: J. Jech

21 May 2011 Round 29	Plzeň	3–1	Ostrava	Plzeň
17:30	Jiráček 25'; Bakoš 31'; Horváth 64'	Report	5' (o.g.) Limberský; (yellow card) 39' Marek; (yellow card) 44' Greguš	Stadium: Stadion města Plzně; Attendance: 7,100; Referee: M. Zelinka

28 May 2011 Round 30	Olomouc	2–1	Plzeň	Olomouc
17:30	Petr 63' 73'; Škerle (yellow card) 53'; Šultes (yellow card) 61'	Report	12' (o.g.) Kučera; (yellow card) 35' Brezinský; (yellow card) 55' Limberský	Stadium: Andrův stadion Attendance: 3,562; Referee: D. Možíš

Last updated: 27 June 2013
Source: iDnes.cz, gambrinusliga.cz

== Czech Cup ==
As a Gambrinus liga team, Plzeň entered the Czech Cup at the second round stage. In the second round, they comfortably overcame home side Baník Most by a 4–1 scoreline. The third round match at Vlašim was another comfortable game, with Plzeň emerging 2–0 winners. Over two legs, Plzeň defeated Opava by a 6–3 aggregate scoreline in the fourth round; having won the home leg 3–0, a 3–3 draw was enough for the team to progress to the next round. In the quarter finals, up against Gambrinus liga competition for the first time in the form of Mladá Boleslav, Plzeň lost both matches 2–1 and therefore went out of the competition 4–2 on aggregate.

7 September 2010 Second Round	Baník Most	1–4	Viktoria Plzeň	Most
	Danovski 85'	Report	10', 29', 37' Bakoš; 23' Rada	Stadium: Fotbalový stadion Josefa Masopusta

6 October 2010 Third Round	Vlašim	0–2	Viktoria Plzeň	Vlašim
		Report	29' Rezek; 62' Ďuriš	Stadium: Stadion Kollárova ulice Referee: Dušan Možíš

10 November 2010 Fourth Round, 1st Leg	Viktoria Plzeň	3–0	Opava	Plzeň
	Bakoš 12'; Jiráček 14'; Horváth 30'	Report		Stadium: Stadion města Plzně; Attendance: 2,565; Referee: Karel Hrubeš

23 November 2010 Fourth Round, 2nd Leg	Opava	3–3 (3–6 agg.)	Viktoria Plzeň	Opava
	Knapp 13', 37' (pen.); Neubert 78'	Report	19' Bakoš; 29' (pen.) Rezek; 57' (pen.) Horváth	Stadium: Stadion v Městských sadech Attendance: 2,032; Referee: Bíma

12 April 2011 Quarter final, 1st Leg	Mladá Boleslav	2–1	Viktoria Plzeň	Mladá Boleslav
	Dimitrovski 30'; Chramosta 37'	Report	78' Bakoš	Stadium: Městský stadion Attendance: 1,824; Referee: Radek Příhoda

20 April 2011 Quarter final, 2nd Leg	Viktoria Plzeň	1–2 (2–4 agg.)	Mladá Boleslav	Plzeň
	Fillo 9'	Report	49' Chramosta; 85' Dimoutsos	Stadium: Stadion města Plzně; Referee: Jaroslav Bílek

== Czech Supercup ==
As winners of the previous season's Czech Cup, Plzeň played defending league champions Sparta Prague in the Czech Supercup on 8 July. It was the first edition of the competition. Both teams had a player sent off in the match; Sparta won the match by a single goal.

8 July 2010 Final	Sparta Prague	1–0	Viktoria Plzeň	Prague
18:00	Sionko 77'	Report		Stadium: Generali Arena; Attendance: 3,401; Referee: Libor Kovařík

== UEFA Europa League ==
Plzeň entered the UEFA Europa League in the third qualifying round, due to having won the 2009–10 Czech Cup. In their first match, they faced Turkish opponents Beşiktaş, drawing 1–1 in the Czech Republic but subsequently losing 3–0 in Turkey, thus losing 4–1 on aggregate.

29 July 2010 Third qualifying round, 1st Leg	Viktoria Plzeň	1–1	(Turkey) Beşiktaş	Prague^{1}
20:30	Limberský 28'	Report	44' (pen.) Delgado	Stadium: Generali Arena; Attendance: 5,875; Referee: Carlos Clos Gómez (Spain)

5 August 2010 Third qualifying round, 2nd Leg	Beşiktaş (Turkey)	3–0 (4–1 agg.)	Viktoria Plzeň	Istanbul
20:00	Quaresma 38'; Delgado 57'; Hološko 71'	Report		Stadium: BJK İnönü Stadium; Attendance: 25,975; Referee: Jérôme Efong Nzolo (Belgium)

- Note 1: Played in Prague at Generali Arena as Viktoria Plzeň's Stadion města Plzně did not meet UEFA criteria.
