= 2011–12 FC Viktoria Plzeň season =

Viktoria Plzeň
2011–12 season
- Chairman: (Czech Republic) Adolf Šádek
- Manager: (Czech Republic) Pavel Vrba
- Stadium: Stadion města Plzně
- Gambrinus liga: 3rd
- CMFS Cup: Fourth Round
- Czech Supercup: Winners
- UEFA Champions League: Group stage (3rd)
- UEFA Europa League: Round of 32
- Top goalscorer: League: Marek Bakoš (16); All: Marek Bakoš (24)
- Highest home attendance: 20,145 v Barcelona (1 November 2011)
- Lowest home attendance: 3,740 v Liberec (30 July 2011)
| Home colours | Away colours |

The 2011–12 season was Viktoria Plzeň's seventh consecutive season in the Gambrinus liga. Having won the Gambrinus liga the previous season, they entered the competition as defending champions. As league champions they also took part in the UEFA Champions League for the first time in their history.

Plzeň started the season by defeating FC Pyunik in the second qualifying round of the UEFA Champions League, winning with an aggregate score of 9–1. Later that month they claimed the Supercup with a penalty shootout win over rivals Mladá Boleslav. The club subsequently navigated the third qualifying round and play-off round of the Champions League to qualify for the group stage, where they were drawn with giants Barcelona and A.C. Milan as well as BATE Borisov. Plzeň scored their first point on 13 September, drawing 1–1 in Prague against Borisov, and their first win came on matchday 5 in the return fixture. Plzeň recorded another point in the final group match, a 2–2 draw with Milan in the San Siro. Having achieved third place in the group, Plzeň qualified for the Europa League.

In the new year, Plzeň entered the UEFA Europa League round of 32, where they lost over two legs to German outfit Schalke 04, this was soon followed by an aggregate defeat to Mladá Boleslav in the Czech Cup. Other than one loss, a 4–0 defeat at home against Olomouc, Plzeň were undefeated in the league in the spring part and went into the final match against title rivals Liberec knowing that a win would seal the title for either team, although a draw would end Plzeň's hopes. The game finished goalless and Liberec won the title, Plzeň having to settle for third place.

== Gambrinus liga ==
=== Results summary ===
| Overall | | | | | | | | Home | | | | | | Away | | | | | |
| Pld | W | D | L | GF | GA | GD | Pts | W | D | L | GF | GA | GD | W | D | L | GF | GA | GD |
|---|---|---|---|---|---|---|---|---|---|---|---|---|---|---|---|---|---|---|---|
| 30 | 19 | 6 | 5 | 66 | 33 | +33 | 63 | 10 | 3 | 2 | 39 | 16 | +23 | 9 | 3 | 3 | 27 | 17 | +10 |

Last updated: 12 May 2012.
Source: Gambrinus liga

=== League table ===
| Pos | Team | Pld | W | D | L | GF | GA | GD | Pts | Qualification or relegation |
|---|---|---|---|---|---|---|---|---|---|---|
| 1 | Slovan Liberec (C) | 30 | 20 | 6 | 4 | 68 | 29 | +39 | 66 | Qualification for Champions League second qualifying round |
| 2 | Sparta Prague | 30 | 20 | 4 | 6 | 51 | 25 | +26 | 64 | Qualification for Europa League third qualifying round (Note: Sigma Olomouc, the 2011–12 Czech Cup winner, were initially to enter the third qualifying round of the Europa League. However, UEFA banned them from participating in Europa League over the club’s involvement in a corruption scandal. As a result, Sparta Prague, the second-placed team of the league, entered the Europa League third qualifying round instead of the second qualifying round, and Mladá Boleslav, the fourth-placed team of the league, will take one of Czech Republic's Europa League places in the second qualifying round.) |
| 3 | Viktoria Plzeň | 30 | 19 | 6 | 5 | 66 | 33 | +33 | 63 | Qualification for Europa League second qualifying round |
| 4 | Mladá Boleslav | 30 | 15 | 5 | 10 | 49 | 34 | +15 | 50 | Qualification for Europa League second qualifying round |
| 5 | Teplice | 30 | 12 | 10 | 8 | 36 | 30 | +6 | 46 | |

Source: Fortuna liga
Rules for classification: 1) points; 2) goal difference; 3) number of goals scored.
(C) Champions

=== Matches ===
==== July ====
| 30 July 2011 Round 1 | Viktoria Plzeň | 2 – 2 | Liberec | Plzeň |
| | Rajtoral 16'; Bystroň 33' | Report | 26' Breznaník; 47' Štajner | Stadium: Stadion města Plzně; Attendance: 3,740; Referee: M. Zelinka |

==== August ====
| 7 August 2011 Round 2 | Bohemians 1905 | 2 – 1 | Viktoria Plzeň | Prague |
| | Nešpor 27'; Bálek 79' | Report | 39' Jiráček | Stadium: Synot Tip Arena; Attendance: 3,023; Referee: Radek Příhoda |

| 12 August 2011 Round 3 | Viktoria Plzeň | 2 – 0 | Teplice | Plzeň |
| | Ďuriš 59'; Pilař 84' | Report | | Stadium: Stadion města Plzně; Attendance: 5,213; Referee: Jaroslav Bílek |

| 20 August 2011 Round 4 | Dukla Prague | 2 – 4 | Viktoria Plzeň | Prague |
| | Hanousek 57', 88' | Report | 23' Jiráček; 44', 80' Pilař; 72' Ďuriš | Stadium: Stadion Juliska; Attendance: 2,857; Referee: Radek Matějek |

| 29 August 2011 Round 5 | Viktoria Plzeň | 0 – 2 | Sparta Prague | Plzeň |
| | | Report | 5', 29' Kweuke | Stadium: Stadion města Plzně; Attendance: 8,415; Referee: Tomáš Adámek |

==== September ====
| 9 September 2011 Round 6 | Olomouc | 2 - 3 | Viktoria Plzeň | Olomouc |
| | Heinz 7', 90' | Report | 4', 9' Bakoš; 79' Kolář | Stadium: Andrův stadion Attendance: 7,144; Referee: Pavel Královec |

| 17 September 2011 Round 7 | Viktoria Plzeň | 4 – 2 | Jablonec | Plzeň |
| | Ďuriš 9', 80'; Horváth 65' (pen.); Kolář 90' | Report | 32' Lafata; 45' Kopic | Stadium: Stadion města Plzně; Attendance: 5,810; Referee: Jan Jílek |

| 23 September 2011 Round 8 | České Budějovice | 0 – 0 | Viktoria Plzeň | České Budějovice |
| | | Report | | Stadium: Stadion Střelecký ostrov Attendance: 3,295; Referee: Petr Mikel |

==== October ====
| 2 October 2011 Round 9 | Viktoria Plzeň | 1 – 1 | Baník Ostrava | Plzeň |
| | Jiráček 17' | Report | 35' Svěrkoš | Stadium: Stadion města Plzně; Attendance: 6,085; Referee: Pavel Franěk |

| 14 October 2011 Round 10 | Slovácko | 1 – 3 | Viktoria Plzeň | Uherské Hradiště |
| | Ondřejka 27' | Report | 4' Bakoš; 39' Petržela; 78' Kolář | Stadium: Městský stadion Referee: Libor Kovařík |

| 23 October 2011 Round 11 | Viktoria Plzeň | 4 – 1 | Viktoria Žižkov | Plzeň |
| | Petržela 51'; Pilař 62'; Čišovský 73'; Bakoš (yellow card) 77' | Report | 67' Böhm | Stadium: Stadion města Plzně; Attendance: 5,736; Referee: Radek Matějek |

| 28 October 2011 Round 12 | Viktoria Plzeň | 5 – 0 | Hradec Králové | Plzeň |
| | Čišovský 11'; Bakoš 60', 79'; Petržela 65'; Fukal 71' (o.g.) | Report | | Stadium: Stadion města Plzně; Attendance: 5,811; Referee: Jiří Jech |

==== November ====
| 6 November 2011 Round 13 | Slavia Prague | 2 – 1 | Viktoria Plzeň | Prague |
| | Pospěch 33'; Hurka 40' | Report | 29' Kolář | Stadium: Synot Tip Arena; Attendance: 8,545; Referee: Jan Jílek |

| 19 November 2011 Round 14 | Viktoria Plzeň | 3 – 2 | Mladá Boleslav | Plzeň |
| | Bakoš 14', 34'; Jiráček 37' | Report | 25' Procházka; 90' Johana | Stadium: Stadion města Plzně; Attendance: 5,835; Referee: Jaroslav Bílek |

| 27 November 2011 Round 15 | Příbram | 2 – 1 | Viktoria Plzeň | Příbram |
| | Pleško 36'; Wágner 52' | Report | 74' Čišovský | Stadium: Na Litavce; Referee: Tomáš Kocourek |

==== December ====
| 2 December 2011 Round 16 | Viktoria Plzeň | 4 – 1 | Bohemians 1905 | Plzeň |
| | Horváth 25' (pen.); Rajtoral 27'; Pilař 41'; Darida 84' | Report | 4' Nešpor | Stadium: Stadion města Plzně; Attendance: 6,090; Referee: Tomáš Adámek |

==== February ====
| 19 February 2012 Round 17 | Teplice | 3 – 4 | Viktoria Plzeň | Teplice |
| | Vondrášek 40'; Vachoušek 48'; Mahmutović 76' | Report | 45' Ďuriš; 56' Pilař; 78', 81' Bakoš | Stadium: Na Stínadlech; Referee: Radek Matějek |

| 25 February 2012 Round 18 | Viktoria Plzeň | 1 – 1 | Dukla Prague | Plzeň |
| | Horváth 30' (pen.) | Report | 52' Malý | Stadium: Stadion města Plzně; Attendance: 6,441; Referee: Tomáš Kocourek |

==== March ====
| 3 March 2012 Round 19 | Sparta Prague | 1 – 3 | Viktoria Plzeň | Prague |
| | Kweuke 15' | Report | 3', 59' Bakoš; 13' Pilař | Stadium: Generali Arena; Referee: Libor Kovařík |

| 11 March 2012 Round 20 | Viktoria Plzeň | 0 – 4 | Olomouc | Plzeň |
| | | Report | 53' Navrátil; 60' Schulmeister; 73' Varadi; 89' Podaný | Stadium: Stadion města Plzně; Attendance: 7,566; Referee: Jaroslav Bílek |

| 17 March 2012 Round 21 | Jablonec | 0 – 2 | Viktoria Plzeň | Jablonec nad Nisou |
| | | Report | 40' Petržela; 45' Kolář | Stadium: Chance Arena; Attendance: 3,120; Referee: Tomáš Adámek |

| 26 March 2012 Round 22 | Viktoria Plzeň | 4 – 0 | České Budějovice | Plzeň |
| | Darida 35', 80'; Bakoš 36'; Ďuriš 81' | Report | | Stadium: Stadion města Plzně; Attendance: 6,751; Referee: Pavel Královec |

==== April ====
| 2 April 2012 Round 23 | Baník Ostrava | 2 – 3 | Viktoria Plzeň | Ostrava |
| | Fantiš 82'; Kukec 84' | Report | 19', 37' Čišovský; 73' Kolář | Stadium: Bazaly; Attendance: 7,234; Referee: Drahoslav Drábek |

| 8 April 2012 Round 24 | Viktoria Plzeň | 1 – 0 | Slovácko | Plzeň |
| | Bakoš 10' | Report | | Stadium: Stadion města Plzně; Attendance: 9,086; Referee: Jan Jílek |

| 15 April 2012 Round 25 | Viktoria Žižkov | 0 – 0 | Viktoria Plzeň | Prague |
| | | Report | | Stadium: FK Viktoria Stadion; Attendance: 1,952; Referee: Jiří Jech |

| 22 April 2012 Round 26 | Hradec Králové | 0 – 1 | Viktoria Plzeň | Hradec Králové |
| | | Report | 40' Limberský | Stadium: Všesportovní stadion Attendance: 5,495; Referee: Pavel Franěk |

| 30 April 2012 Round 27 | Viktoria Plzeň | 3 – 0 | Slavia Prague | Plzeň |
| | Bakoš 9'; Petržela 18', 44' | Report | | Stadium: Stadion města Plzně; Attendance: 11,412; Referee: Radek Matějek |

==== May ====
| 6 May 2012 Round 28 | Mladá Boleslav | 0 – 1 | Viktoria Plzeň | Mladá Boleslav |
| | | Report | 18' Ševínský | Stadium: Městský stadion Attendance: 3,854; Referee: Radek Příhoda |

| 9 May 2012 Round 29 | Viktoria Plzeň | 5 – 0 | Příbram | Plzeň |
| | Horváth 5' (pen.), 71' (pen.); Bakoš 22'; Petržela 37'; Čišovský 69' | Report | | Stadium: Stadion města Plzně; Attendance: 11,142; Referee: Jaroslav Bílek |

| 12 May 2012 Round 30 | Liberec | 0 – 0 | Viktoria Plzeň | Liberec |
| | | Report | | Stadium: Stadion u Nisy; Attendance: 10,000; Referee: Pavel Královec |

== Czech Cup ==
As a Gambrinus liga team, Plzeň entered the Czech Cup at the second round stage. In the second round, they comfortably overcame home side Karlovy Vary by a 4–1 scoreline. The third round match at Baník Sokolov was another comfortable game, with Plzeň emerging 3–1 winners. In the fourth round, up against Gambrinus liga competition for the first time in the form of Mladá Boleslav, Plzeň managed a draw in the first game before losing by a two-goal margin in the second leg and therefore losing on aggregate and going out of the competition.

| 7 September 2011 Second Round | Karlovy Vary | 1 – 4 | Viktoria Plzeň | Karlovy Vary |
| | Nerad 66' | Report | 31', 50' Ďuriš; 81' (o.g.) Kura; 86' Krmenčík | Attendance: 1,120 |

| 12 November 2011 Third Round | Baník Sokolov | 1 – 3 | Viktoria Plzeň | Sokolov |
| | Vaněček 74' | Report | 18' Ďuriš; 29', 51' Hora | Stadium: Stadion FK Baník Sokolov; Referee: Pavel Ochotnický |

| 7 March 2012 Fourth Round, 1st Leg | Viktoria Plzeň | 1 – 1 | Mladá Boleslav | Plzeň |
| | Wágner 57' | Report | 48' Šćuk | Stadium: Stadion města Plzně; Attendance: 4,292; Referee: Pavel Orel |

| 14 March 2012 Fourth Round, 2nd Leg | Mladá Boleslav | 2 – 0 (3 – 1 agg.) | Viktoria Plzeň | Mladá Boleslav |
| | Kúdela 16'; Chramosta 76' | Report | | Stadium: Městský stadion Attendance: 1,682; Referee: Dušan Možíš |

== Czech Supercup ==
As winners of the previous season's Gambrinus liga, Plzeň played defending cup champions Mladá Boleslav in the Czech Supercup on 22 July. After finishing 1–1 in normal time, Plzeň prevailed on penalties to win the cup. Having lost to Sparta in the inaugural super cup the previous season, this was Plzeň's first title.

| 22 July 2011 Final | Viktoria Plzeň | 1 – 1 (4–2 p) | Mladá Boleslav | Plzeň |
| | Hora 84' | Report | 35' (pen.) Táborský | Stadium: Stadion města Plzně; Attendance: 2,920; Referee: Pavel Královec |

== UEFA Champions League ==
=== Qualifying rounds ===
Plzeň entered the UEFA Champions League in the second qualifying round, due to finishing first in the 2010–11 Gambrinus liga. In their first match, they faced Armenian opponents FC Pyunik, winning 9–1 on aggregate. In the third round of qualifying it was Rosenborg BK of Norway who were Plzeň's opposition, Plzeň coming through the tie 4–2 on aggregate. The next round, the playoff round, would determine which team would advance to the lucrative group stage of the competition. Denmark's F.C. Copenhagen were the team standing between Plzeň and the group stage; Plzeň won both legs of their match and progressed to the group stage. Due to the reconstruction of Plzeň's stadium, Viktoria played the play-off round at Eden Arena in Prague.

| 12 July 2011 Second Qualifying Round, 1st Leg | Pyunik (Armenia) | 0 – 4 | Viktoria Plzeň | Yerevan |
| 17:00 | | Report | 7', 40' (pen.) Bakoš; 28' (pen.) Horváth; 72' Kolář | Stadium: Hanrapetakan Stadium; Attendance: 3,000; Referee: Michael Lerjeus (Sweden) |

| 19 July 2011 Second Qualifying Round, 2nd Leg | Viktoria Plzeň | 5 – 1 (9 – 1 agg.) | (Armenia) Pyunik | Plzeň |
| 20:15 | Bakoš 38', 42'; Kolář 45+1', 57'; Pilař 90+1' | Report | 49' Malakyan | Stadium: Stadion města Plzně; Attendance: 5,400; Referee: Antti Munukka (Finland) |

| 27 July 2011 Third Qualifying Round, 1st Leg | Rosenborg (Norway) | 0 – 1 | Viktoria Plzeň | Trondheim |
| 20:45 | | Report | 33' Pilař | Stadium: Lerkendal Stadion; Attendance: 8,028; Referee: Matej Jug (Slovenia) |

| 3 August 2011 Third Qualifying Round, 2nd Leg | Viktoria Plzeň | 3 – 2 (4 – 2 agg.) | (Norway) Rosenborg | Plzeň |
| 20:15 | Bakoš 56'; Kolář 60'; Petržela 78' | Report | 44' Lustig; 77' Prica | Stadium: Stadion města Plzně; Attendance: 5,124; Referee: Marijo Strahonja (Croatia) |

| 16 August 2011 Play-off Round, 1st Leg | Copenhagen (Denmark) | 1 – 3 | Viktoria Plzeň | Copenhagen |
| 20:45 | Ottesen 69' | Report | 52' (o.g.) Ottesen; 59' Pilař; 79' Fillo | Stadium: Parken Stadium; Attendance: 19,148; Referee: Martin Atkinson (England) |

| 24 August 2011 Play-off Round, 2nd Leg | Viktoria Plzeň | 2 – 1 (5 – 2 agg.) | (Denmark) Copenhagen | Prague |
| 20:45 | Bakoš 67'; Ďuriš 90+3' | Report | 32' Bolaños | Stadium: Synot Tip Aréna; Attendance: 19,350; Referee: Carlos Velasco Carballo (Spain) |

=== Group stage ===
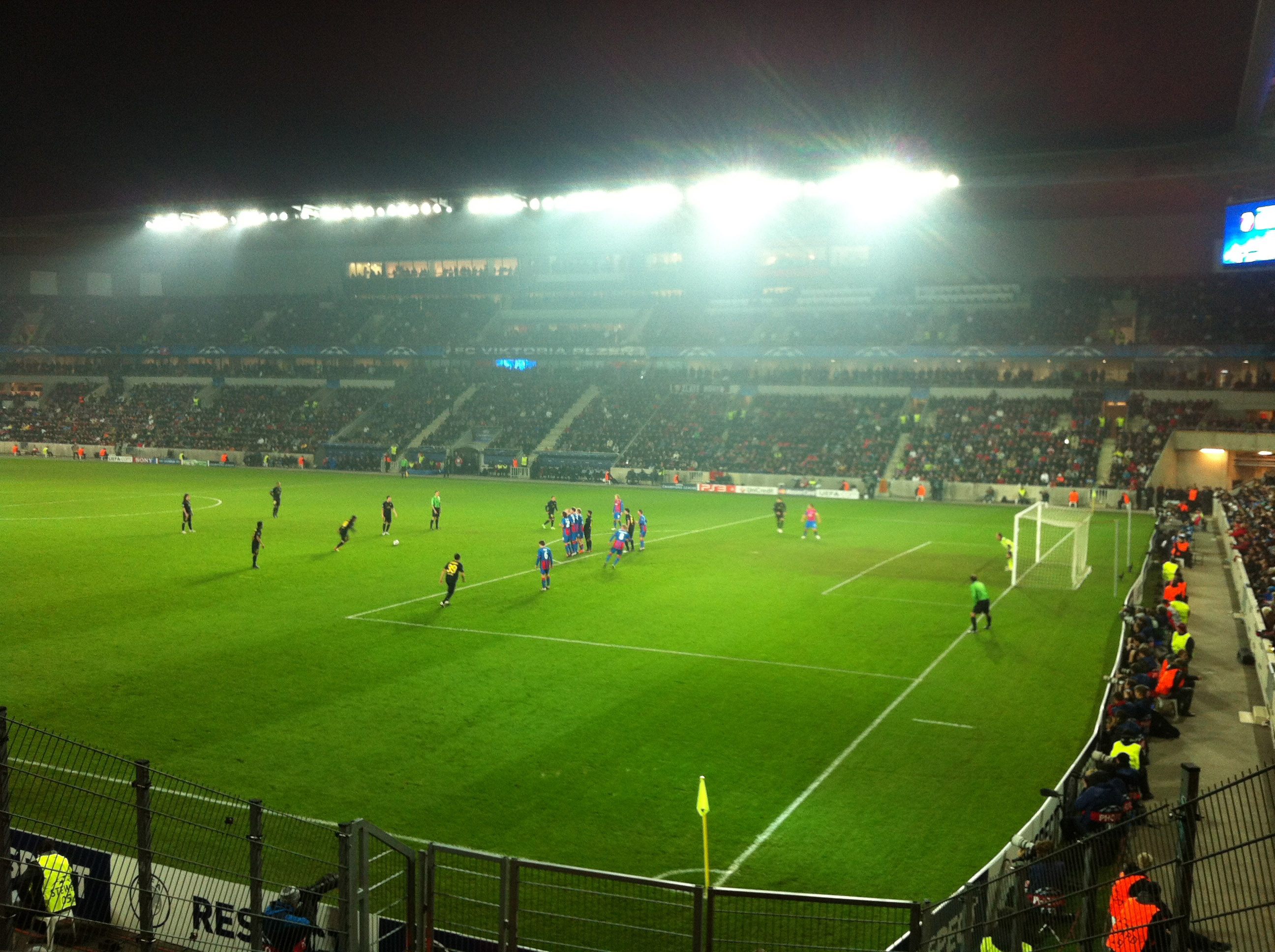
Group stage match at Prague's Eden Arena against Barcelona

Plzeň were seeded in the fourth pot for the draw, being drawn in Group H alongside defending champions Barcelona as well as A.C. Milan and BATE Borisov. In the group stage, Plzeň played their home matches at Eden Arena in Prague due to the ongoing development of their own Stadion města Plzně.

Plzeň scored their first Champions League point in the 1–1 home draw against BATE. In the following matches, in which they played away against Milan and Barcelona, Plzeň had difficulties, losing 2–0 both games and not even managing a single shot on goal in the latter.

On gameday four, Plzeň hosted Barcelona. Being reduced to ten men and witnessing a Lionel Messi hat-trick, Plzeň lost in front of a crowd of over 20,000 by a 4–0 scoreline. The last two games showed a marked improvement for Plzeň as they defeated BATE in Minsk and then scored two late goals to draw 2–2 with Milan in Prague. Finishing third in the group, they qualified for the 2011–12 UEFA Europa League knockout phase.

| Pos | Team | Pld | W | D | L | GF | GA | GD | Pts | Qualification |
|---|---|---|---|---|---|---|---|---|---|---|
| 1 | (Spain) Barcelona | 6 | 5 | 1 | 0 | 20 | 4 | +16 | 16 | Advance to knockout phase |
| 2 | (Italy) Milan | 6 | 2 | 3 | 1 | 11 | 8 | +3 | 9 | Advance to knockout phase |
| 3 | (Czech Republic) Viktoria Plzeň | 6 | 1 | 2 | 3 | 4 | 11 | −7 | 5 | Transfer to Europa League |
| 4 | (Belarus) BATE Borisov | 6 | 0 | 2 | 4 | 2 | 14 | −12 | 2 | |

Source: Soccerway

| 13 September 2011 | Viktoria Plzeň | 1 – 1 | (Belarus) BATE Borisov | Prague |
| 20:45 | Bakoš 45+1' | Report | 69' Bressan | Stadium: Synot Tip Aréna; Attendance: 19,541; Referee: Laurent Duhamel (France) |

| 28 September 2011 | Milan (Italy) | 2 – 0 | Viktoria Plzeň | Milan |
| 20:45 | Ibrahimović 53' (pen.); Cassano 66' | Report | | Stadium: San Siro; Attendance: 66,859; Referee: Florian Meyer (Germany) |

| 19 October 2011 | Barcelona (Spain) | 2 – 0 | Viktoria Plzeň | Barcelona |
| 20:45 | Iniesta 10'; Villa 82' | Report | | Stadium: Camp Nou; Attendance: 74,375; Referee: Aleksandar Stavrev (Macedonia) |

| 1 November 2011 | Viktoria Plzeň | 0 – 4 | (Spain) Barcelona | Prague |
| 20:45 | | Report | 24' (pen.), 45+2', 90+2' Messi; 72' Fàbregas | Stadium: Synot Tip Aréna; Attendance: 20,145; Referee: Robert Schörgenhofer (Austria) |

| 23 November 2011 | BATE Borisov (Belarus) | 0 – 1 | Viktoria Plzeň | Minsk |
| 19:00 | | Report | 42' Bakoš | Stadium: Stadion Dynama; Attendance: 26,520; Referee: Kevin Blom (Netherlands) |

| 6 December 2011 | Viktoria Plzeň | 2 – 2 | (Italy) Milan | Prague |
| 20:45 | Bystroň 89'; Ďuriš 90+3' | Report | 47' Pato; 49' Robinho | Stadium: Synot Tip Aréna; Attendance: 19,854; Referee: István Vad (Hungary) |

== UEFA Europa League ==
Plzeň continued their European adventure in February 2012 with a match against German outfit Schalke 04. After a 1–1 draw in the first leg, Rajtoral scored a late equaliser in Germany to take the tie into extra time. However, the German side, in front of a crowd of over 50,000, scored two goals in the additional period, signalling the end of European football this season for Plzeň.

| 16 February 2012 | Viktoria Plzeň | 1 – 1 | (Germany) Schalke 04 | Plzeň |
| 19:00 | Darida 22' | Report | 75' Huntelaar | Stadium: Stadion města Plzně; Attendance: 11,435; Referee: Stéphane Lannoy (France) |

| 23 February 2012 | Schalke 04 (Germany) | 3 – 1 (a.e.t.) (4 – 2 agg.) | Viktoria Plzeň | Gelsenkirchen |
| 21:05 | Huntelaar 8', 106', 120+1' | Report | 88' Rajtoral | Stadium: Veltins-Arena; Attendance: 54,142; Referee: Alan Kelly (Republic of Ireland) |
