= Martin Fillo =

Czech footballer (born 1986)

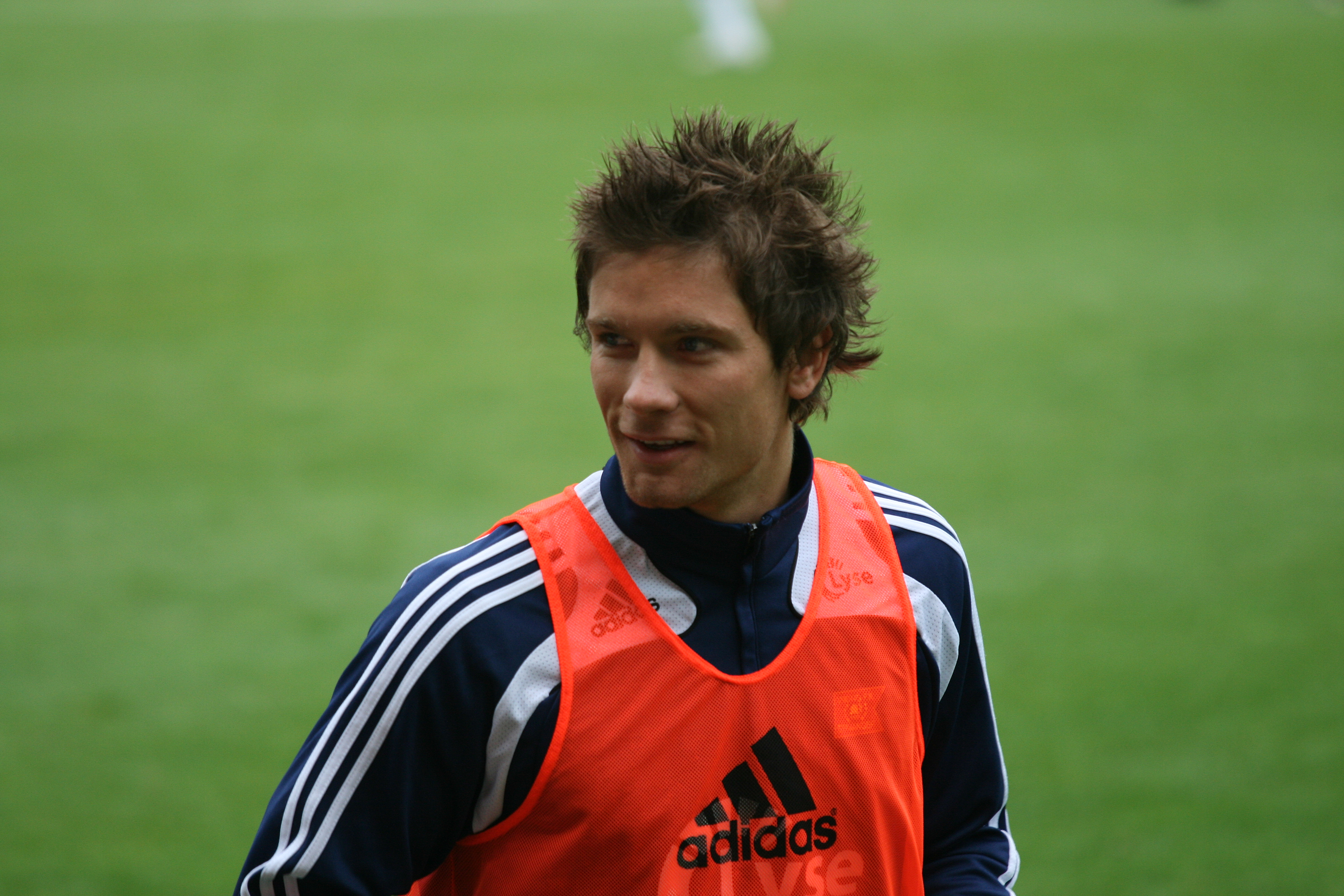
- Fillo warming up with Viking in 2008

Personal information
- Date of birth: 7 February 1986 (age 40)
- Place of birth: Planá, Czechoslovakia
- Height: 1.75 m (5 ft 9 in)
- Position: Right winger

Youth career
- 1992–1994: TJ Košutka Plzeň
- 1994–1996: SK Plzeň 1894
- 1996–2004: Viktoria Plzeň

Senior career*
Years	Team	Apps	(Gls)
2004–2007	Viktoria Plzeň	105	(23)
2008–2010	Viking	65	(14)
2011–2015	Viktoria Plzeň	33	(1)
2012	→ Mladá Boleslav (loan)	13	(2)
2012	→ Mladá Boleslav (loan)	8	(0)
2013–2014	→ Brentford (loan)	7	(0)
2014–2015	→ Příbram (loan)	24	(2)
2015–2017	Teplice	71	(22)
2018–2021	Baník Ostrava	107	(5)
2021–2023	Trinity Zlín	46	(4)
2023–2024	Jiskra Domažlice	23	(7)
2024–2025	Weiden	25	(3)

International career
2003	Czech Republic U18	2	(0)
2004–2005	Czech Republic U19	14	(4)
2006–2008	Czech Republic U21	21	(2)
2009	Czech Republic	3	(0)
- * Club domestic league appearances and goals as of 23:30, 26 January 2026 (UTC)

Martin Fillo (born 7 February 1986) is a Czech professional footballer who plays as a right winger.

Fillo is a former Czech Republic international and has played domestic football in the Czech Republic, Norway, England and Germany. He played Czech top-flight football for Viktoria Plzeň, Mladá Boleslav, Příbram, Teplice, Baník Ostrava and Zlín.

== Playing career ==
=== Viktoria Plzeň ===
After beginning his youth career with TJ Košutka Plzeň and SK Plzeň 1894, Fillo joined the youth system at Viktoria Plzeň in 1996. He began his senior career with 2. Liga club and helped it to promotion to the First League during the 2004–05 season. In his first full season in the top flight, he made 29 appearances and scored five goals, as Plzeň narrowly avoided relegation. He played 15 matches and scored five goals during the 2007–08 season, before making his last appearance for the club in December 2007.

=== Viking ===
In 2008, Fillo signed a five-year contract with Norwegian Tippeligaen club Viking, for a club record fee which amounted to more than 15.7 million kr. He made his debut for Viking on match day one of the 2008 season, assisting the winning goal and being voted man of the match in a 1–0 victory over Strømsgodset IF. He scored his first goal for Viking in a 1–0 victory over Tromsø IL on match day four. He appeared consistently during the 2008 season, making 28 appearances and scoring 8 goals. He made 25 appearances and scored three goals during the 2009 season and played in Viking's UEFA Cup qualifiers, which ended with a second round defeat to Honka. During the 2010 season, Fillo made only 15 appearances, but scored five goals, including a hat-trick against Odds on 4 July 2010.

=== Return to Viktoria Plzeň ===
Fillo re-signed for Viktoria Plzeň on a 4 1/2-year contract during the 2010–11 season and made 12 appearances, scoring one goal. He won the first silverware of his career, having helped Plzeň to the First League title and he also won the 2011 Czech Supercup with the club. Fillo made 9 appearances and scored one goal during the first half of the 2011–12 season and spent the second half of the season on loan at fellow First League club Mladá Boleslav. He made 17 appearances and helped the club a fourth-place finish (one place behind his parent club Viktoria Plzeň) and Europa League qualification.

Fillo made 27 appearances for Viktoria Plzeň during the club's First League-winning 2012–13 season. He played part of the first half of the season on loan at Mladá Boleslav, making 10 appearances before returning to Plzeň prior to the winter break.

In July 2013, Fillo agreed a season-long loan with English League One club Brentford, linking up with Uwe Rösler, his former manager at Viking. He scored one goal in 9 appearances, before being dropped from the team in October 2013. New manager Mark Warburton indicated in late December 2013 that he would hold talks with Fillo over his future. Fillo was made available for loan on 19 February 2014, but did not win any further calls into the first team squad before the end of the season.

Fillo joined First League club 1. FK Příbram on loan for the duration of the 2014–15 season. He made 27 appearances and scored two goals before his Viktoria Plzeň contract expired at the end of the season. Fillo made 56 appearances and scored three goals in his second spell with Plzeň.

=== Teplice ===
In July 2015, Fillo signed a three-year contract with First League club FK Teplice on a free transfer. Over the course of 2 1/2 seasons, he made 74 appearances and scored 23 goals and departed Na Stínadlech in December 2017.

=== Baník Ostrava ===
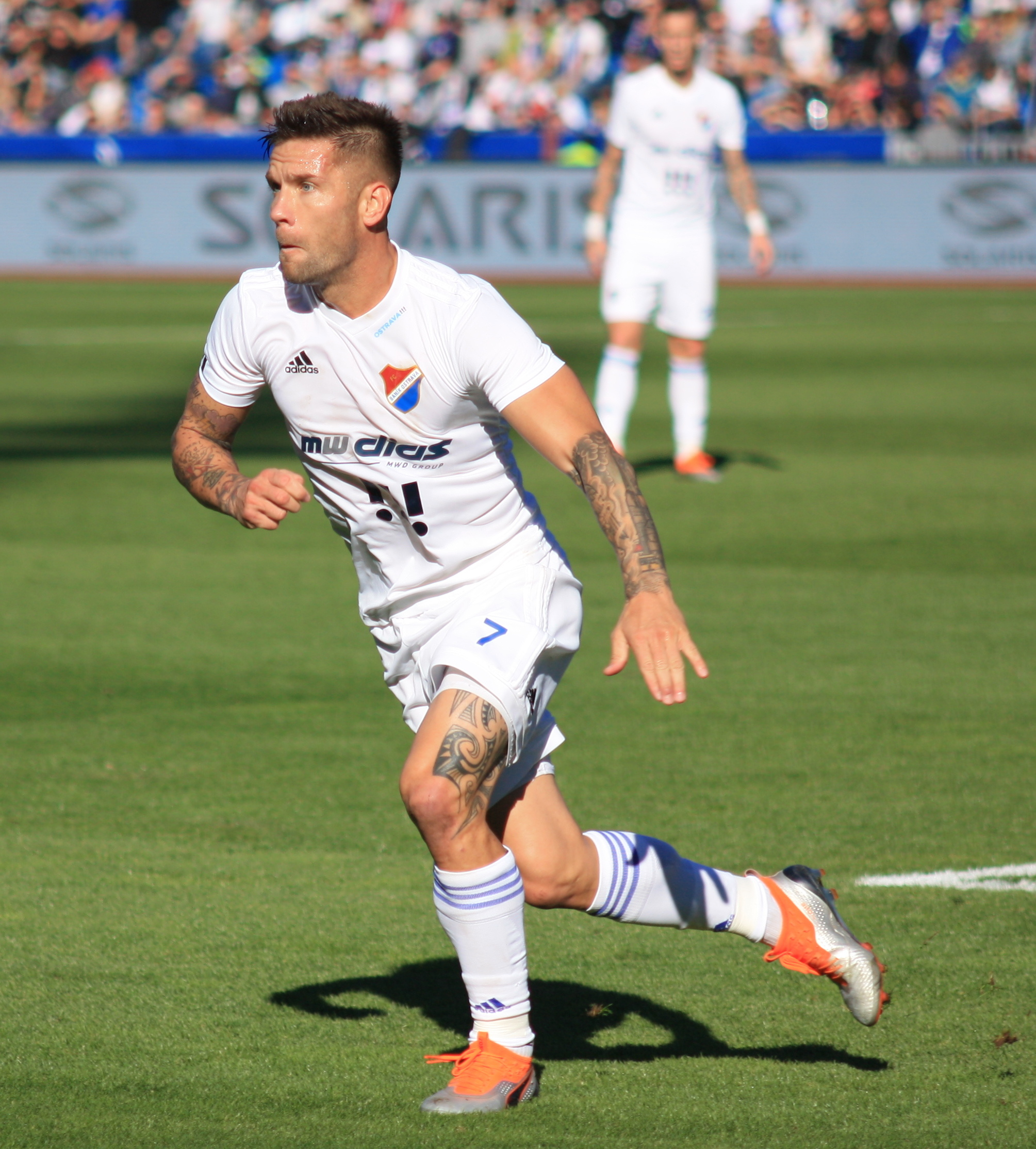
Fillo playing for FC Baník Ostrava in 2018

On 29 December 2017, Fillo joined Czech First League club FC Baník Ostrava on a permanent contract for an undisclosed fee. He made 115 appearances and scored five goals during 3 1/2 seasons with the club.

=== Trinity Zlín ===
On 4 June 2021, Fillo joined Czech First League club FC Trinity Zlín (then named FC Fastav Zlín) on a two-year contract for an undisclosed fee. He made 51 appearances and four scored goals during the 2021–22 and 2022–23 seasons, in both of which the club narrowly avoided relegation. Fillo was released when his contract expired.

=== Jiskra Domažlice ===
During the 2023 off-season, Fillo transferred to Bohemian League A club Jiskra Domažlice. He made 25 appearances and scored seven goals during a 2023–24 season in which the club narrowly missed the division's promotion playoff place. He departed the club in June 2024.

=== SpVgg SV Weiden ===
On 26 June 2024, Fillo transferred to German Bayernliga Nord club SpVgg SV Weiden. He made 25 appearances and scored three goals during the 2024–25 season. Fillo was released when his contract expired.

== International career ==
Fillo represented the Czech Republic at youth level and was U21 captain. He won three caps for the senior team in 2009.

== Career statistics ==
As of match played 17 May 2025

Appearances and goals by club, season and competition
Season	Club	League			National cup (Note: Includes Czech Cup, Norwegian Cup, FA Cup)		League cup (Note: Includes EFL Cup)		Europe		Other		Total	
Season	Club	Division	Apps	Goals	Apps	Goals	Apps	Goals	Apps	Goals	Apps	Goals	Apps	Goals
Viktoria Plzeň	2003–04	Czech First League	8	2	0	0	—		—		—		8	2
Viktoria Plzeň	2004–05	Czech 2. Liga	25	5	0	0	—		—		—		25	5
Viktoria Plzeň	2005–06	Czech First League	29	5	0	0	—		—		—		29	6
Viktoria Plzeň	2006–07	Czech First League	28	6	0	0	—		—		—		28	7
Viktoria Plzeň	2007–08	Czech First League	15	5	0	0	—		—		—		15	5
Viktoria Plzeň	Total		105	23	0	0	—		—		—		105	23
Viking	2008	Tippeligaen	25	6	3	2	—		4 (Note: Appearances in UEFA Cup/UEFA Europa League)	0	—		32	8
Viking	2009	Tippeligaen	25	3	1	0	—		—		—		26	3
Viking	2010	Tippeligaen	15	5	3	0	—		—		—		18	5
Viking	Total		65	14	7	2	—		4	0	—		76	16
Viktoria Plzeň	2010–11	Czech First League	10	0	2	1	—		—		—		12	1
Viktoria Plzeň	2011–12	Czech First League	9	0	0	0	—		7 (Note: Appearances in UEFA Champions League)	1	1 (Note: Appearance in Czech Supercup)	0	17	1
Viktoria Plzeň	2012–13	Czech First League	14	1	2	0	—		11	3	—		27	4
Viktoria Plzeň	Total		138	24	4	1	—		18	4	1	0	161	29
Mladá Boleslav (loan)	2011–12	Czech First League	13	2	4	0	—		—		—		17	2
Mladá Boleslav (loan)	2012–13	Czech First League	8	0	2	1	—		—		—		10	1
Mladá Boleslav (loan)	Total		21	2	6	1	—		—		—		27	3
Brentford (loan)	2013–14	League One	7	0	0	0	1	1	—		1 (Note: Appearance in Football League Trophy)	0	9	1
1. FK Příbram (loan)	2014–15	Czech First League	24	2	3	0	—		—		—		27	2
FK Teplice	2015–16	Czech First League	28	9	1	0	—		—		—		29	9
FK Teplice	2016–17	Czech First League	28	8	0	0	—		—		—		28	8
FK Teplice	2017–18	Czech First League	15	5	2	1	—		—		—		17	6
FK Teplice	Total		71	22	3	1	—		—		—		74	23
FC Baník Ostrava	2017–18	Czech First League	13	0	1	0	—		—		—		14	0
FC Baník Ostrava	2018–19	Czech First League	33	3	5	0	—		—		1 (Note: Appearance in Czech First League Europa League play-offs)	0	39	3
FC Baník Ostrava	2019–20	Czech First League	29	2	2	0	—		—		—		31	2
FC Baník Ostrava	2020–21	Czech First League	32	0	0	0	—		—		—		32	0
FC Baník Ostrava	Total		107	5	8	0	—		—		1	0	115	5
FC Trinity Zlín	2021–22	Czech First League	26	1	3	0	—		—		—		29	1
FC Trinity Zlín	2022–23	Czech First League	20	3	2	0	—		—		0	0	22	3
FC Trinity Zlín	Total		46	4	5	0	—		—		0	0	51	4
Jiskra Domažlice	2023–24	Bohemian League A	23	7	2	0	—		—		—		25	7
SpVgg SV Weiden	2024–25	Bayernliga Nord	25	3	—		—		—		—		25	3
Career total			526	82	38	5	1	1	22	4	3	0	190	93

== Honours ==
Viktoria Plzeň

- Czech First League: 2010–11, 2012–13
- Czech 2. Liga third-place promotion: 2004–05
- Czech Supercup: 2011–12
