= Jan Rezek =

Czech professional footballer (born 1982)

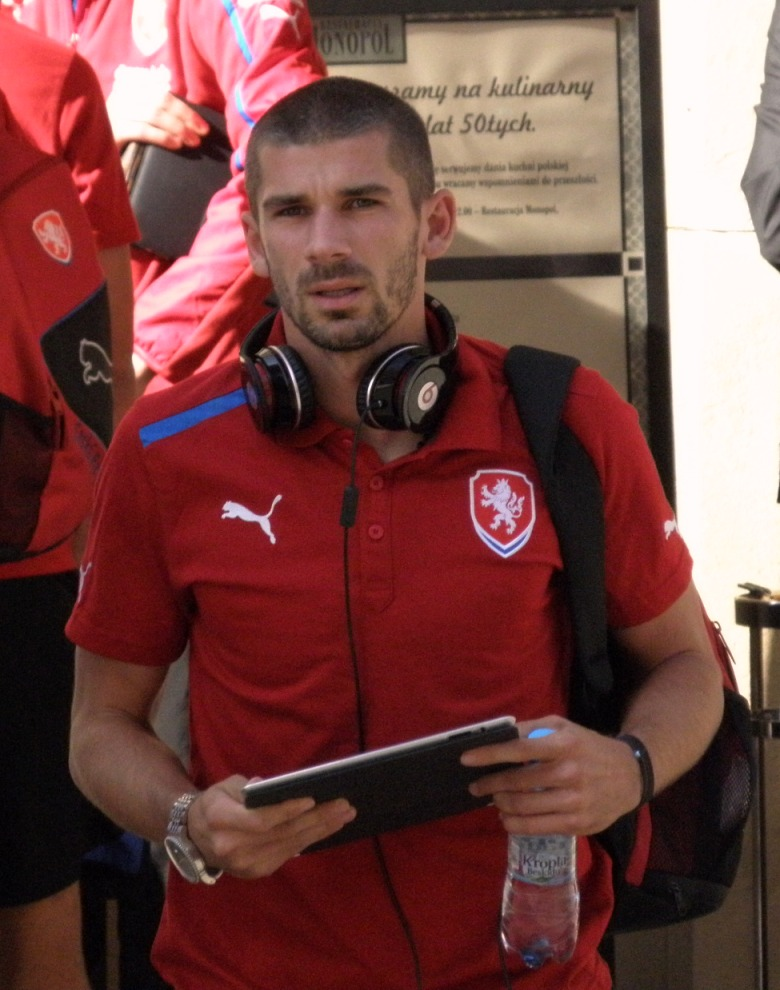

Personal information
- Date of birth: 5 May 1982 (age 44)
- Place of birth: Teplice, Czechoslovakia
- Height: 1.78 m (5 ft 10 in)
- Positions: Second striker; winger

Youth career
- 1988–1995: TJ Sokol Březno
- 1995–1997: Dioss Chomutov
- 1997–2000: Teplice

Senior career*
Years	Team	Apps	(Gls)
2002–2003	Teplice	36	(3)
2002	→ Chomutov (loan)	13	(4)
2004–2005	Sparta Prague	17	(1)
2005–2006	Kuban Krasnodar	13	(0)
2006	Viktoria Plzeň	6	(2)
2006–2008	Sparta Prague	30	(3)
2008	→ Bohemians 1905 (loan)	10	(2)
2008–2011	Viktoria Plzeň	72	(17)
2011–2013	Anorthosis Famagusta	53	(19)
2013–2014	Changchun Yatai	14	(3)
2014	Viktoria Plzeň	4	(0)
2014	Apollon Limassol	13	(1)
2015	Ermis Aradippou	9	(0)
2015–2017	1. FK Příbram	55	(10)
2017–2018	Teplice	25	(5)
2018–2021	1. FK Příbram	79	(6)
2021	Teplice B		
2021	Teplice	10	(1)
2021–2023	Teplice B		
2023–2024	Sokol Březno		

International career
2003	Czech Republic U-21	2	(0)
2010–2012	Czech Republic	21	(4)

Managerial career
- 2023–: Teplice (assistant)
- 2025–2026: Czech Republic (assistant)
- * Club domestic league appearances and goals as of 19 December 2021

Jan Rezek (born 5 May 1982) is a former Czech professional footballer. At international level, he has represented the Czech Republic.

== Career ==
Rezek played for several top Czech clubs before and spent also one season in Russia at FC Kuban Krasnodar. In 2003, he won the Czech Cup with FK Teplice, one year later he won the cup with Sparta Prague. He won the Czech First League in 2006–2007 season with Sparta and also the FA cup in the same year. In 2010, he won the cup with FC Viktoria Plzeň. He is a member of the Czech Republic national football team. In 2011, Rezek was the subject of controversy when he appeared to dive to win the Czech Republic a penalty against Scotland national football team at Hampden Park. As a result, the Czech Republic qualified for Euro 2012 ahead of the Scots.

In July 2013, Rezek signed a two-and-a-half-year contract with Chinese Super League side Changchun Yatai. On 14 July, he made his debut and scored his first goal for Changchun in a 3–2 defeat against Shandong Luneng Taishan.

== Career statistics ==
=== Club ===
As of match played 19 December 2021

Appearances and goals by club, season and competition
Club	Season	League			National Cup		Continental		Other		Total	
Club	Season	Division	Apps	Goals	Apps	Goals	Apps	Goals	Apps	Goals	Apps	Goals
Teplice	2002–03	Czech First League	23	2	1	0	2	0	—		26	2
Teplice	2003–04	Czech First League	13	1			4	2	—		17	3
Teplice	Total		36	3	1	0	6	2	—		43	5
Chomutov (loan)	2001–02	Czech National Football League	13	4			—		—		13	4
Sparta Prague	2003–04	Czech First League	10	0	1	1	0	0	—		11	1
Sparta Prague	2004–05	Czech First League	7	1			3	0	—		10	1
Sparta Prague	Total		17	1	1	1	3	0	—		21	2
Kuban Krasnodar	2005	Russian First Division	13	0			—		—		13	0
Viktoria Plzeň	2006–07	Czech First League	6	2	—		—		—		6	2
Sparta Prague	2006–07	Czech First League	19	2	2	0	0	0	—		21	2
Sparta Prague	2007–08	Czech First League	11	1			7	0	—		18	1
Sparta Prague	Total		30	3	2	0	7	0	—		39	3
Bohemians 1905 (loan)	2007–08	Czech First League	10	2			—		—		10	2
Viktoria Plzeň	2008–09	Czech First League	20	3			—		—		20	3
Viktoria Plzeň	2009–10	Czech First League	22	3	5	1	—		—		27	4
Viktoria Plzeň	2010–11	Czech First League	30	11	3	2	2	0	—		35	13
Viktoria Plzeň	Total		72	17	8	3	2	0	—		82	20
Anorthosis Famagusta	2011–12	Cypriot First Division	26	7	3	1	4	3	—		33	11
Anorthosis Famagusta	2012–13	Cypriot First Division	27	12	3	0	4	0	—		34	12
Anorthosis Famagusta	Total		53	19	6	1	8	3	—		67	23
Changchun Yatai	2013	Chinese Super League	14	3	—		—		—		14	3
Viktoria Plzeň	2013–14	Czech First League	4	0	2	1	0	0	—		6	1
Apollon Limassol	2014–15	Cypriot First Division	13	1	2	0	6	1	—		21	2
Ermis Aradippou	2014–15	Cypriot First Division	9	0	2	0	—		—		11	0
1. FK Příbram	2015–16	Czech First League	26	5	2	1	—		—		28	6
1. FK Příbram	2016–17	Czech First League	29	5	1	1	—		—		30	6
1. FK Příbram	Total		55	10	3	2	—		—		58	12
Teplice	2017–18	Czech First League	25	5	1	1	—		—		26	5
1. FK Příbram	2018–19	Czech First League	26	4	3	1	—		2	0	31	5
1. FK Příbram	2019–20	Czech First League	28	1	0	0	—		—		28	1
1. FK Příbram	2020–21	Czech First League	25	1	1	0	—		—		26	1
1. FK Příbram	Total		79	6	4	1	—		2	0	85	7
Teplice	2021–22	Czech First League	10	1	1	0	—		—		11	1
Career total			459	77	33	10	32	6	2	0	526	93

=== International goals ===
#	Date	Venue	Opponent	Score	Result	Competition
1.	6 September 2011	Prague, Czech Republic	Ukraine	3–0	4-0	Friendly
2.	11 October 2011	Kaunas, Lithuania	Lithuania	0–2	1-4	UEFA Euro 2012 qualifying Group I
3.	11 October 2011	Kaunas, Lithuania	Lithuania	0–3	1-4	UEFA Euro 2012 qualifying Group I
4.	12 October 2012	Plzeň, Czech Republic	Malta	3–1	3-1	2014 World Cup qualifier

== Honours ==
=== Club ===
Teplice

- Czech Cup: 2003

Sparta Praha

- Czech First League: 2004–05, 2006–07
- Czech Cup: 2007

Viktoria Plzeň

- Czech First League: 2010–11
- Czech Cup: 2010

Anorthosis Famagusta

- PASP best goal of the week: 2012 (3rd 4th Match day)
