= Valenta =

Valenta (feminine Valentová) is a Czech and Slovak surname. Notable people with the surname include:

- Aleš Valenta (b. 1973), Czech skier
- Arnošt Valenta (1912–1944), Czech aviator, one of "The Fifty" men murdered by the Gestapo after the Great Escape, World War II
- Edvard Valenta (1901–1978), Czech journalist and author
- Ivo Valenta, Czech businessman and politician
- Jaroslava Valentová, Czech athlete
- Jiří Valenta (footballer), Czech footballer
- Matěj Valenta, Czech footballer
- Michal Valenta, Czech footballer
- Ondřej Valenta, Czech cross-country skier
- Róbert Valenta, Slovak footballer
- Soňa Valentová, Slovak actress
- Tereza Valentová, Czech tennis player
- Velimir Valenta (1929–2004), Croatian rower
- Věroslav Valenta, Czech athlete
- Vít Valenta (b. 1983), Czech football player
- Zdeněk Valenta, Czech canoer

== Other uses ==
- Paxman Valenta, diesel engine
