= Tomáš Marek =

Czech footballer

Personal information
- Date of birth: 20 April 1981 (age 45)
- Place of birth: Kladno, Czechoslovakia
- Height: 1.77 m (5 ft 10 in)
- Position: Midfielder

Youth career
- 1986–1992: SK Kamenné Žehrovice
- 1992–2000: SK Kladno

Senior career*
Years	Team	Apps	(Gls)
2000–2002	Viktoria Plzeň	15	(1)
2002–2003	FK Admira/Slavoj		
2003–2006	SK Kladno	86	(3)
2006–2012	FC Baník Ostrava	155	(3)
2012–2016	FC Vysočina Jihlava	74	(3)

International career^{‡}
2009	Czech Republic	1	(0)
- * Club domestic league appearances and goals as of 11 October 2018 ‡ National team caps and goals as of 12 December 2012

Tomáš Marek (born 20 April 1981) is a Czech former football player.

In the 2006–07 Gambrinus liga, Marek was one of four players in the league to play every minute of every match.

His only Czech Republic appearance came in a friendly match against Morocco on 11 February 2009.
