= František Rajtoral =

Czech footballer (1986-2017)

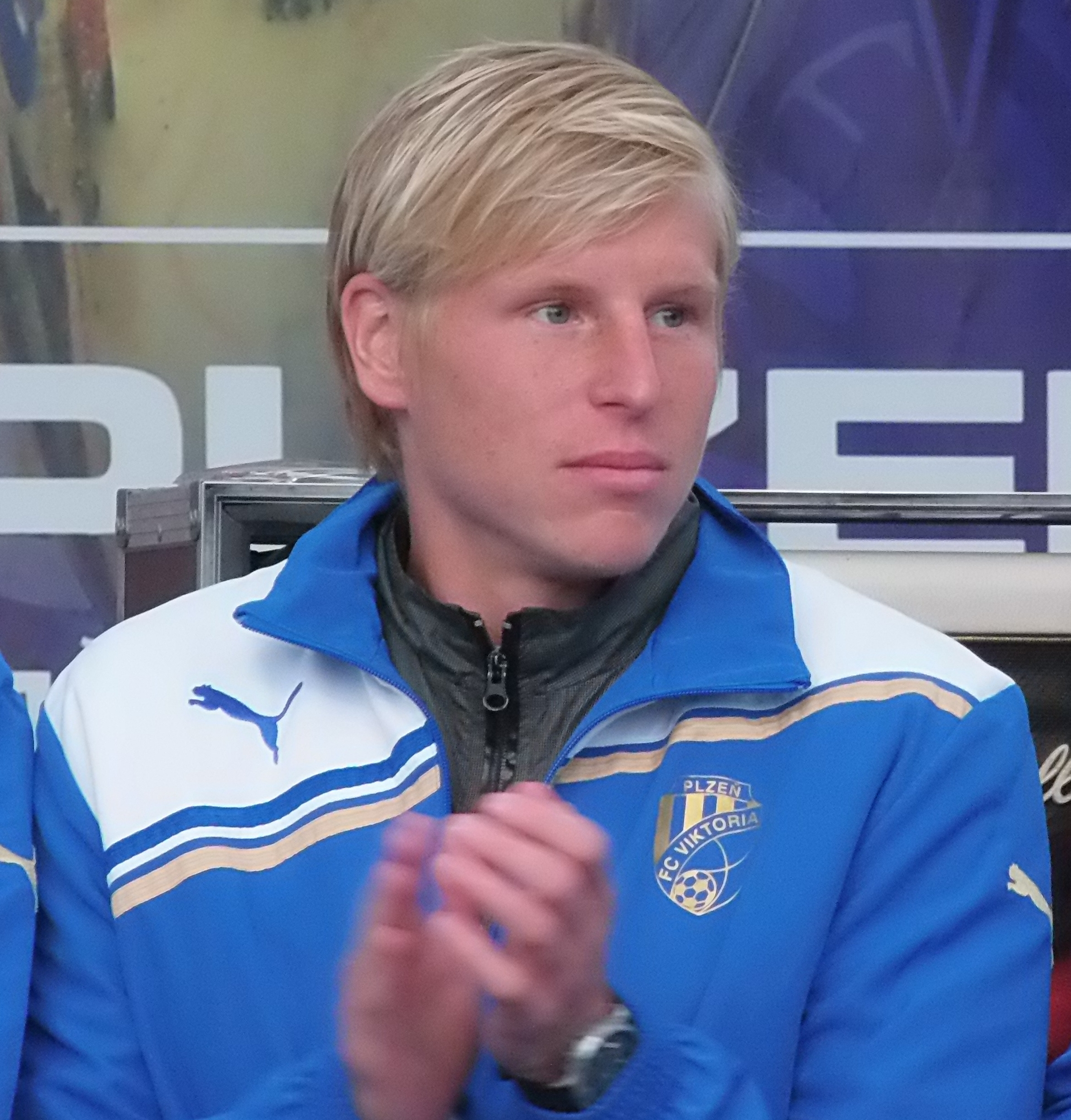
- Rajtoral in 2013

Personal information
- Date of birth: 12 March 1986
- Place of birth: Příbram, Czechoslovakia
- Date of death: c.23 April 2017 (aged 31)
- Place of death: Gaziantep, Turkey
- Height: 1.80 m (5 ft 11 in)
- Positions: Right winger; right-back

Youth career
- 1992–1994: Kovohutě Příbram
- 1994–2004: Marila Příbram

Senior career*
Years	Team	Apps	(Gls)
2004–2005	Marila Příbram	15	(1)
2005–2009	Baník Ostrava	100	(12)
2009–2016	Viktoria Plzeň	168	(19)
2014	→ Hannover 96 (loan)	7	(0)
2016–2017	Gaziantepspor	12	(0)
Total		302	(32)

International career
2004	Czech Republic U18	5	(0)
2004–2005	Czech Republic U19	10	(1)
2006–2008	Czech Republic U21	15	(1)
2012–2014	Czech Republic	14	(0)
- * Club domestic league appearances and goals

František Rajtoral (12 March 1986 – ca. 23 April 2017) was a Czech professional footballer who played as a right winger or right-back. He was best known for his stint at Viktoria Plzeň. He was a member of the Czech Republic national team.

He won the Czech Cup with Viktoria Plzeň in 2010. Further trophies he won with the club include the Gambrinus Liga twice and the Czech Supercup.

On 29 February 2012, Rajtoral earned his first cap for the senior team of his country in the 1–1 draw with Ireland in a friendly match.

Rajtoral was described as "one of the best attacking right-wingers in the Czech Republic" by journalist Mark Smith.

== Club career ==
=== Early career ===
Rajtoral played for Příbram for a season before joining Baník Ostrava, with whom he signed a three-year contract in 2005. He made his debut in European competitions in the 2005–06 UEFA Cup while playing for Ostrava.

=== Viktoria Plzeň ===
He joined Viktoria Plzeň from Ostrava in 2009 in a deal which involved the exchange of striker Adam Varadi in the other direction.

Rajtoral played in the inaugural Czech Supercup in 2010 against Sparta Prague, being one of two players to be sent off as his team lost the match. He scored his first goal of the 2010–11 season in October 2010 against Mladá Boleslav, but his team lost the game 4–3.

Rajtoral played the second half of the 2011 Czech Supercup, a match which Plzeň won on penalties against Mladá Boleslav. He replaced Marián Čišovský in the 46th minute, in a match which finished 1–1.

=== Hannover 96 ===
In January 2014 Rajtoral joined German Bundesliga club Hannover 96 on loan for the remainder of the season with an option to make the transfer permanent. Hannover passed on that option though and Rajtoral returned to Plzeň for the start of the new season.

=== Gaziantepspor and death ===
Rajtoral joined Gaziantepspor in August 2016. He was found dead in his home in Gaziantep, Turkey, on 23 April 2017 after not turning up for a training session with his team in the morning. His neighbors contacted the local authorities in concern when they found his apartment door locked from the inside with no response. Upon investigation local authorities announced that Rajtoral had committed suicide by hanging.

== International career ==
Rajtoral took part in the 2007 UEFA European Under-21 Championship. He played in all three of his nation's matches at the tournament.

He made his senior debut on 29 February 2012 in a friendly match against Ireland, a game which finished 1–1. In May 2012 he was named in his country's 23-man squad for the Euro 2012 tournament.

== Personal life ==
Rajtoral was born in Příbram, where he made his professional breakthrough in Czech First League with Marila Příbram. In 2008 he was diagnosed with chronic fatigue syndrome and underwent treatment for several months. His disease recurred again in 2014.

On 24 April 2017, he did not participate in training sessions for Gaziantepspor. He was found dead in his apartment by police after committing suicide on Sunday. It has been hypothesized that the breakup with his longtime girlfriend in 2016 and the departure of his friend Daniel Kolář in February 2017 may have worsened his psychological situation. Coincidentally, in a month, his death was followed by that of David Bystroň, a former teammate and defensive partner at Viktoria Plzeň, who committed a similar suicide.

== Career statistics ==
Appearances and goals by club, season and competition
Club	Season	League			Cup		Continental		Total	
Club	Season	Division	Apps	Goals	Apps	Goals	Apps	Goals	Apps	Goals
Marila Příbram	2004–05	Czech First League	15	1	0	0	0	0	15	1
Baník Ostrava	2005–06	Czech First League	26	0	0	0	0	0	26	0
Baník Ostrava	2006–07	Czech First League	26	8	0	0	0	0	26	8
Baník Ostrava	2007–08	Czech First League	25	3	0	0	0	0	25	3
Baník Ostrava	2008–09	Czech First League	23	1	0	0	0	0	23	1
Baník Ostrava	Total		100	12	0	0	0	0	100	12
Viktoria Plzeň	2009–10	Czech First League	27	3	5	0	0	0	32	3
Viktoria Plzeň	2010–11	Czech First League	27	3	5	0	2	0	34	3
Viktoria Plzeň	2011–12	Czech First League	29	2	2	0	14	1	45	3
Viktoria Plzeň	2012–13	Czech First League	28	3	2	0	16	3	46	6
Viktoria Plzeň	2013–14	Czech First League	16	3	1	0	12	2	29	5
Viktoria Plzeň	Total		127	14	15	0	44	6	186	20
Hannover 96	2013–14	Bundesliga	7	0	0	0	0	0	7	0
Viktoria Plzeň	2014–15	Czech First League	16	4	4	1	0	0	20	4
Viktoria Plzeň	2015–16	Czech First League	22	1	7	0	9	0	38	1
Viktoria Plzeň	2016–17	Czech First League	3	0	0	0	0	0	3	0
Viktoria Plzeň	Total		41	5	11	1	9	0	61	6
Gaziantepspor	2016–17	Süper Lig	12	0	7	0	0	0	19	0
Career total			302	32	33	1	53	6	388	39

== Honours ==
Viktoria Plzeň

- Czech Cup: 2010
- Gambrinus liga: 2010–11, 2012–13, 2014–15, 2015–16
- Czech Supercup: 2011, 2015
