= Radek Hochmeister =

Czech footballer (born 1982)

Personal information
- Full name: Radek Hochmeister
- Date of birth: 6 September 1982 (age 44)
- Place of birth: Prague, Czechoslovakia
- Height: 1.91 m (6 ft 3 in)
- Position: Defender

Youth career
- 1990–2002: Sparta Prague

Senior career*
Years	Team	Apps	(Gls)
2002–2005	Sparta Prague	0	(0)
2003–2004	→ Jablonec (loan)	44	(2)
2005–2009	Slovan Liberec	43	(1)
2007	→ Sigma Olomouc (loan)	6	(0)
2008	→ Kladno (loan)	14	(0)
2008	→Viktoria Plzeň (loan)	6	(0)
2009–2014	Hradec Králové	87	(7)
2014	→ Bohemians Prague (loan)	13	(1)

International career
2003	Czech Republic U21	1	(0)
- * Club domestic league appearances and goals as of 30 June 2014

Radek Hochmeister (born 6 September 1982) is a Czech former football defender who has played in the Czech First League for various clubs.
