= Tomáš Krbeček =

Czech footballer

Personal information
- Date of birth: 27 October 1985 (age 41)
- Place of birth: Cheb, Czechoslovakia
- Height: 1.85 m (6 ft 1 in)
- Position: Midfielder

Youth career
- 1990–1993: Agro Cheb
- 1993–1995: Svit Zlín
- 1995–1997: Teplice
- 1997–2004: Viktoria Plzeň

Senior career*
Years	Team	Apps	(Gls)
2004–2011	Viktoria Plzeň	83	(11)
2009	Slovan Liberec (loan)	4	(0)
2010–2011	Ústí nad Labem (loan)	26	(3)
2011	Ružomberok (loan)	10	(1)
2012	Příbram (loan)	14	(2)
2012–2015	Příbram	56	(3)
2015–2016	Slavoj Vyšehrad	15	(0)
2016–2017	Bayern Hof	16	(1)
2017–2021	TSV Bogen	49	(4)

International career^{‡}
2003	Czech Republic U19	1	(0)
2007	Czech Republic U21	1	(0)
- * Club domestic league appearances and goals as of 28 June 2022 ‡ National team caps and goals as of 28 June 2022

Tomáš Krbeček (born 27 October 1985) is a former Czech footballer. He played as striker and central midfielder.
