= Tomáš Rada =

Czech footballer

Personal information
- Date of birth: 28 September 1983 (age 43)
- Place of birth: Prague, Czechoslovakia
- Height: 1.88 m (6 ft 2 in)
- Position: Centre back

Team information
- Current team: Avia Čakovice
- Number: 4

Youth career
- 1988–2003: Sparta Prague

Senior career*
Years	Team	Apps	(Gls)
2003–2004	SIAD Most		
2004–2005	Sparta Prague B		
2005–2010	Viktoria Plzeň	138	(5)
2011–2013	Sivasspor	23	(0)
2012–2013	→ Vysočina Jihlava (loan)	24	(1)
2013–2018	Slovácko	91	(1)
2018–2019	Loko Vltavín	42	(2)
2019–2021	Meteor Prague		
2021–2024	Hostivař		
2024–2025	Viktoria Všestudy		
2025–	Avia Čakovice		
- * Club domestic league appearances and goals as of 18:31, 17 November 2019 (UTC)

Tomáš Rada (born 28 September 1983) is a Czech footballer, who currently plays for Avia Čakovice as a centre back.

He also played for the Czech youth national teams since the under-15 level.

== Career ==
After having played for FC Viktoria Plzeň, he signed a three-and-a-half-year contract with Sivasspor in January 2011.

== Honours ==
=== Club ===
FC Viktoria Plzeň

- Czech Cup: 2010
