= Lubor Knapp =

Czech football player (born 1976)

Personal information
- Date of birth: 3 August 1976 (age 50)
- Place of birth: Frýdek-Místek, Czechoslovakia
- Height: 1.78 m (5 ft 10 in)
- Position: Midfielder

Team information
- Current team: SK Pržno
- Number: 14

Youth career
- VP Frýdek-Místek
- Baník Ostrava

Senior career*
Years	Team	Apps	(Gls)
1997–1998	VP Frýdek-Místek	12	(0)
1998–2000	NH Ostrava	44	(3)
2000	VTJ Znojmo		
2001	Ozeta Dukla Trenčín	18	(2)
2001–2002	Spartak Trnava		
2002–2003	Baník Ostrava	0	(0)
2003–2004	Viktoria Plzeň	10	(0)
2004–2006	Vítkovice	52	(1)
2006–2007	Odra Wodzisław Śląski	5	(0)
2007	Vítkovice	12	(1)
2008	Senec	14	(0)
2008–2010	AS Trenčín	45	(5)
2010–2011	Opava	26	(2)
2011–2012	Union Baumgartenberg	21	(1)
2012	SU Bischofstetten	12	(4)
2013	FK Real Lískovec		
2013–2014	Vítkovice		
2014–2015	SK Markvartovice		
2015–2018	SC Traismauer		
2018–2019	SK Beskyd Čeladná		
2020–	SK Pržno		

International career
- Czechoslovakia U16
Medal record
Men's football
Representing Czechoslovakia
UEFA European Under-16 Championship
Third place	1993 Turkey
- * Club domestic league appearances and goals

Lubor Knapp (born 3 August 1976) is a Czech footballer player who plays as a midfielder for SK Pržno.

== Career ==
Knapp played for several top flight Czech and Slovak football clubs, including Baník Ostrava, Viktoria Plzeň and AS Trenčín. He also played briefly in Poland for Odra Wodzisław Śląski.

== Honours ==
Czechoslovakia U16

- UEFA European Under-16 Championship third place: 1993
