= Roman Pavlík =

Czech footballer

Personal information
- Full name: Roman Pavlík
- Date of birth: 17 January 1976 (age 50)
- Place of birth: Klatovy, Czechoslovakia
- Height: 1.86 m (6 ft 1 in)
- Position: Goalkeeper

Senior career*
Years	Team	Apps	(Gls)
1995–2004	Dropa Střížkov		
2004–2006	Bohemians 1905		
2006–2010	SK Kladno	89	(0)
2010–2016	FC Viktoria Plzeň	35	(0)
- * Club domestic league appearances and goals

Roman Pavlík (born 17 January 1976) is a former Czech footballer. His position was goalkeeper.
