= Adam Ševínský =

Czech footballer (born 2004)

Personal information
- Date of birth: 19 June 2004 (age 22)
- Place of birth: Czech Republic
- Height: 1.87 m (6 ft 2 in)
- Position: Centre-back

Team information
- Current team: Sparta Prague
- Number: 19

Youth career
- 2011–2016: Slavia Prague
- 2016–2023: Sparta Prague

Senior career*
Years	Team	Apps	(Gls)
2023–	Sparta Prague	24	(1)
2023–2024	→ Sparta Prague B	28	(0)
2024	→ Slovan Liberec (loan)	16	(1)

International career^{‡}
2021–2022	Czech Republic U18	11	(2)
2022	Czech Republic U19	5	(1)
2023–2024	Czech Republic U20	6	(0)
2024–	Czech Republic U21	7	(0)
- * Club domestic league appearances and goals as of 25 May 2026 ‡ National team caps and goals as of 24 March 2025

Adam Ševínský (born 19 June 2004) is a Czech professional footballer who plays as a defender for AC Sparta Prague and the Czech Republic U21 team. He is the son of footballer František Ševínský.

== Family ==
Ševínský is the son of the video analyst and former footballer František Ševínský. He has a younger brother.

== Club career ==
Ševínský started playing football at the football club in Radošovice. In 2011, he transferred to the academy of Slavia Prague. In 2016, he transferred to the academy of Sparta Prague. He made his debut in senior football in November 2022, playing for Sparta Prague B in the Czech National Football League.

Ševínský went on loan to Slovan Liberec ahead of the 2024–25 season. He scored a goal for the club on his Czech First League debut in July 2024, which Slovan Liberec won 3–1 in an away match against Karviná. During his time in Slovan Liberec, he impressed with his performances, which is why Sparta Prague withdrew him from the loan at the beginning of 2025. Ševínský then became the second runner-up in the Talent of the Year award of the 2025 Czech Footballer of the Year poll.

== International career ==
Ševínský played for the U18–U20 Czech Republic national teams. He played a total of 23 matches for the U18–U20 teams and scored three times. From 2024, he plays for the Czech Republic U21 team. He appeared in the 2025 UEFA European Under-21 Championship qualification, but was not nominated into the final tournament squad.
