= Karel Krejčí =

Czech footballer and manager

Personal information
- Date of birth: 20 December 1968 (age 57)
- Place of birth: Plzeň, Czechoslovakia
- Position: Midfielder

Senior career*
Years	Team	Apps	(Gls)
1987–1988	VTJ Jindřichův Hradec		
1988–1989	VTJ Písek		
1989–1993	TJ Škoda Plzeň		
1993–1995	FC Svit Zlín	53	(2)
1995–1998	FK Dukla Prague		
1998–2000	České Budějovice		

Managerial career
- 2008: Viktoria Plzeň
- 2014–2016: Czech Republic (assistant)
- 2015–2016: Viktoria Plzeň
- 2016–2018: Czech Republic U20
- 2018–2021: Czech Republic U21
- 2023–2024: Příbram
- * Club domestic league appearances and goals

Karel Krejčí (born 20 December 1968) is a Czech football manager and former player who was the manager of Czech Republic U-21. He was born in Plzeň.

== Playing career ==
Krejčí played in the Czech First League in the 1990s, representing FC Svit Zlín, 1. FK Příbram and České Budějovice. His last First League match was three minutes in a 7–0 loss to Sparta Prague.

== Managerial career ==
Following his career as a player, Krejčí became coach of Příbram reserve football team. Krejčí joined Czech First League side Plzeň as manager in April 2008 for the end of the 2007–08 Czech First League after Levý´s departure. In new season he became assistant of new head coach Jaroslav Šilhavý and later Pavel Vrba. This coach duo Vrba-Krejčí started in Plzeň very successful era, in which the club won two league titles, one cup title, and three consecutive seasons of participation in the UEFA Europa League knockout stage. When in December 2013 Vrba joined the Czech Republic national football team as head coach, Krejčí continued to work with him as his first assistant. In August 2015, Krejčí was named as the new manager of Viktoria Plzeň after Miroslav Koubek´s departure because of unsuccessful start of new season.

== Managerial statistics ==
As of 19 May 2016

Team	From	To	Record							
Team	From	To	G	W	D	L	GF	GA	GD	Win %
Plzeň	22 April 2008	30 May 2008	4	2	1	1	9	6	+3	50.00
Plzeň	16 August 2015	19 May 2016	41	29	3	9	74	34	+40	70.73
Career totals			45	31	4	10	83	40	+43	68.89

== Honours ==
=== Managerial ===
Viktoria Plzeň

- Czech First League: 2015–16
