= Jiří Janoušek =

Czech footballer

Personal information
- Date of birth: 17 November 1989 (age 36)
- Place of birth: Czechoslovakia
- Height: 1.88 m (6 ft 2 in)
- Position: Midfielder

Team information
- Current team: MFK Chrudim
- Number: 16

Senior career*
Years	Team	Apps	(Gls)
2009–2019	FC Hradec Králové	52	(0)
2014–2015	→FK Varnsdorf (loan)		
2015	→FK Fotbal Třinec (loan)		
2019–	MFK Chrudim		
- * Club domestic league appearances and goals as of 31 December 2011

Jiří Janoušek (born 17 November 1989) is a professional Czech football player who currently plays for MFK Chrudim.
