= Martin Kasálek =

Czech footballer

Personal information
- Full name: Martin Kasálek
- Date of birth: 8 September 1980 (age 46)
- Place of birth: Brno, Czechoslovakia
- Height: 1.91 m (6 ft 3 in)
- Position: Defender

Senior career*
| Years | Team | Apps | (Gls) |
| 2004–2006 | Kunovice | | |
| 2006–2007 | Trenčín | 16 | (0) |
| 2007–2009 | Bystrc | | |
| 2009–2011 | Hradec Králové | 58 | (4) |
| 2011–2012 | FC Zbrojovka Brno | 13 | (0) |
- * Club domestic league appearances and goals as of 30 June 2012

Martin Kasálek (born 8 September 1980) is a Czech football player who played in the Gambrinus liga for Hradec Králové.

He has played for the Czech Republic national futsal team.
