= David Limberský =

Czech footballer

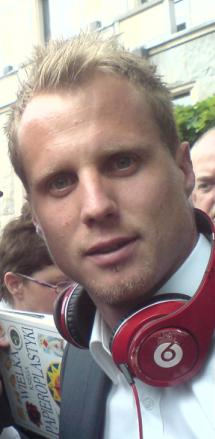
- Limberský with the Czech Republic at UEFA Euro 2012

Personal information
- Date of birth: 6 October 1983 (age 43)
- Place of birth: Plzeň, Czechoslovakia
- Height: 1.81 m (5 ft 11 in)
- Position: Left back

Team information
- Current team: Jiskra Domažlice (vice-chairman)

Youth career
- 1989–1990: Tatran Třemošná
- 1990–2002: Viktoria Plzeň

Senior career*
Years	Team	Apps	(Gls)
2003–2007	Viktoria Plzeň	56	(7)
2004	→ Modena (loan)	4	(0)
2005	→ Tottenham Hotspur (loan)	0	(0)
2007–2008	Sparta Prague	13	(0)
2008–2021	Viktoria Plzeň	327	(15)
2021–2024	Jiskra Domažlice	35	(0)
Total		435	(22)

International career
2003	Czech Republic U-20	9	(4)
2004–2005	Czech Republic U-21	11	(1)
2009–2016	Czech Republic	40	(1)
- * Club domestic league appearances and goals as of 2021-01-31

David Limberský (born 6 October 1983) is a former Czech professional footballer who played for Czech clubs FC Viktoria Plzeň and AC Sparta Prague. He was a member of the Czech Republic national football team.

== Club career ==
=== Early career ===
Born in Plzeň, Limberský played for hometown team Viktoria Plzeň and spent time at Italian side Modena on loan in the 2003–04 Serie A. He joined Tottenham Hotspur in December 2004 on a six-month loan. Upon signing for Tottenham, Limberský was compared to Czech legend Pavel Nedvěd by Spurs coach Martin Jol. Despite this, Limberský did not feature in any of Tottenham's matches during his time in England.

Limberský played in the final of the 2009–10 Czech Cup in a 2–1 victory against Jablonec. He played at the first Czech Supercup against Sparta Prague in 2010, played the entire game as Sparta won 1–0.

Limberský played in all of Plzeň's matches in the 2011–12 UEFA Champions League. In the group stages of the following season's Europa League, he was headbutted by Diego Costa, an incident which brought the Atlético Madrid forward a four-match UEFA ban.

Having ended his professional career in June 2021, Limberský joined third-tier club Jiskra Domažlice. On 13 January 2024, Limberský ended his football career due to a persistent knee injury and became sporting director of Jiskra Domažlice.

== International career ==
Limberský played for the Czech Republic at the 2003 FIFA World Youth Championship, scoring goals against Australia and Brazil respectively.

On 5 June 2009, at the age of 25, Limberský debuted for the Czech senior squad in a 1-0 friendly victory against Malta. He was chosen as part of the Czech Republic's squad for the 2011 Kirin Cup. However, Limberský did not feature in any of their games in the tournament.

=== UEFA Euro 2012 ===
Despite not playing in any qualification match for major tournaments, as well as having never previously played a competitive game for his national side, Limberský was called up for UEFA Euro 2012. He was left out of the Czechs' first game against Russia, where his side were heavily beaten 4–1. Limberský was brought in for the Czech Republic's second game against Greece in his first ever competitive game for the national side, playing at left back. The Czech Republic won that game 2–1, with Limberský doing enough to be retained for the Czech Republic's must-win game against co-hosts Poland. His side defeated Poland 1–0 and ended up as group winners, meaning that they would face Portugal in the quarter finals. Limberský again played left back against Portugal where the Czech Republic were knocked out after a 1–0 loss.

=== UEFA Euro 2016 ===
Limberský was included in the final 23-man squad for the UEFA EURO 2016, starting in all three of the Czech Republic's matches until its elimination from the group stage.

== Controversy ==
Limberský gained media attention after crashing his Bentley car in September 2015 and subsequently behaving abusively towards several police officers and testing with a high blood alcohol content, offences which carry a maximum three-year prison sentence. He was subsequently stripped of the captaincy of Viktoria Plzeň and fined for "an absolutely unacceptable violation of the professional contract". Limberský apologised, but four days after the incident, celebrated his first of two goals in a 4–0 win against Příbram by pretending to drive a car. The club moved to distance itself from Limberský's gestures.

== Career statistics ==
=== Club ===
As of 7 March 2020

Club	Season	League			Cup		Continental		Other		Total	
Club	Season	Division	Apps	Goals	Apps	Goals	Apps	Goals	Apps	Goals	Apps	Goals
Viktoria Plzeň	2003–04	Czech First League	12	0	—		—		—		12	0
Viktoria Plzeň	2005–06	Czech First League	23	3	0	0	—		—		23	3
Viktoria Plzeň	2006–07	Czech First League	21	4	0	0	—		—		21	4
Viktoria Plzeň	Total		56	7	0	0	—		—		56	7
Modena (loan)	2003–04	Serie A	4	0	—		—		—		4	0
Tottenham Hotspur (loan)	2004–05	Premier League	0	0	0	0	—		0	0	0	0
Sparta Prague	2007–08	Czech First League	12	0	0	0	6	0	—		18	0
Viktoria Plzeň	2008–09	Czech First League	27	3	0	0	—		—		27	3
Viktoria Plzeň	2009–10	Czech First League	26	1	1	0	—		—		27	1
Viktoria Plzeň	2010–11	Czech First League	29	2	0	0	2	1	1	0	32	3
Viktoria Plzeň	2011–12	Czech First League	29	1	0	0	13	0	1	0	43	1
Viktoria Plzeň	2012–13	Czech First League	28	0	2	0	15	0	—		45	0
Viktoria Plzeň	2013–14	Czech First League	27	1	6	0	12	0	0	0	45	1
Viktoria Plzeň	2014–15	Czech First League	26	2	3	0	2	0	1	0	32	2
Viktoria Plzeň	2015–16	Czech First League	27	2	3	0	10	0	1	0	41	2
Viktoria Plzeň	2016–17	Czech First League	24	0	0	0	9	0	—		33	0
Viktoria Plzeň	2017–18	Czech First League	20	1	0	0	10	0	—		30	1
Viktoria Plzeň	2018–19	Czech First League	32	0	0	0	7	0	—		39	0
Viktoria Plzeň	2019–20	Czech First League	15	1	2	0	2	0	—		19	1
Viktoria Plzeň	Total		310	14	17	0	82	1	4	0	413	15
Career total			382	21	17	0	88	1	4	0	491	22

=== International goals ===
Scores and results list Czech Republic's goal tally first.

#	Date	Venue	Opponent	Score	Result	Competition
1.	6 September 2015	Skonto Stadium, Riga, Latvia	Latvia	1–0	2–1	UEFA Euro 2016 qualifying

== Honours ==
=== Club ===
Viktoria Plzeň

- Czech First League: 2010–11, 2012–13, 2014–15
- Czech 2. Liga: 2002–03
- Czech Cup: 2009-10
- Czech Supercup: 2011
