= David Bystroň =

Czech footballer (1982–2017)

Personal information
- Date of birth: 18 November 1982
- Place of birth: Levoča, Czechoslovakia
- Date of death: 19 May 2017 (aged 34)
- Place of death: Ilanz, Switzerland
- Height: 1.92 m (6 ft 4 in)
- Position: Centre-back

Youth career
- 1990–2001: Baník Ostrava

Senior career*
Years	Team	Apps	(Gls)
2001–2008	Baník Ostrava	183	(8)
2008–2010	Levski Sofia	19	(2)
2009–2010	→ Viktoria Plzeň (loan)	24	(1)
2010–2012	Viktoria Plzeň	42	(3)
2014–2016	Sigma Olomouc	9	(1)
2016	FC Linth		
2016–2017	US Schluein Ilanz		
Total		277	(15)

International career
1997	Czech Republic U15	2	(1)
1999	Czech Republic U16	7	(1)
1999–2001	Czech Republic U17	17	(1)
2000–2001	Czech Republic U18	11	(3)
2002	Czech Republic U20	1	(0)
2002–2003	Czech Republic U21	2	(0)
- * Club domestic league appearances and goals

David Bystroň (18 November 1982 – 19 May 2017) was a Czech professional footballer who played as a centre-back, spending most of his career in the Czech First League with Baník Ostrava. He also played for Viktoria Plzeň, Sigma Olomouc and Bulgarian side Levski Sofia. He represented the Czech Republic internationally at youth levels U17, U18, U20 and U21.

== Career ==
=== Baník Ostrava ===
Bystroň played seven seasons for Czech side Baník Ostrava, where he won the 2003–04 Czech First League and won the Czech Cup in 2005.

=== Levski Sofia ===
Bystroň signed for Levski Sofia on 22 June 2008. Bystroň signed a three-year contract on 27 June 2008. He made his unofficial debut for Levski on 5 July 2008 in a friendly match against Spartak Pleven. Levski won the match and the result was 5–0.

Bystroň made his official debut for Levski on 13 August 2008 in a match against BATE Borisov. The result was 0–1 with a home loss. Bystroň scored his first goal for Levski on 17 August 2008 in a match against Botev Plovdiv. He became a Champion of Bulgaria in 2009.

=== Viktoria Plzeň ===
Bystroň joined Viktoria Plzeň on loan on 12 August 2009. He played there until the end of the 2009/10 season. He won the Czech Cup in 2010 with Viktoria Plzeň.

After a period on loan, he was bought by Viktoria.

On 6 December 2011, Bystroň scored a goal in the 2–2 draw with Milan in a UEFA Champions League match.

==== Doping ban ====
After a UEFA Champions League match against BATE Borisov in November 2011, Bystroň tested positive for prohibited substance methamphetamine in a drug test. In January 2012, the 'B' sample also tested positive for the substance. He commenced a two-year ban from professional football starting on 3 January 2012, due to finish on 3 January 2014. His contract with Plzeň was terminated on 13 February 2012.

=== Later career ===
After he had been cleared for playing again, he signed for Olomouc in the Czech National Football League. In 2016, he joined Swiss amateur club FC Linth in the Swiss fifth league. In 2017, he moved to another Swiss amateur club, US Schluein Ilanz.

== Death ==
Bystroň died on May 19, 2017, of suicide by hanging at his home in Ilanz, Switzerland.

His death occurred less than a month after František Rajtoral, a former teammate and defensive partner at Viktoria Plzeň, also died by suicide.

== Honours ==
- Champion of Bulgaria 2008–09
- Champion of the Czech Republic 2003–04, 2010–11
- Czech Cup 2004–05, 2009–10
