= Radek Mezlík =

Czech footballer (born 1982)

Personal information
- Date of birth: 20 May 1982 (age 44)
- Place of birth: Czechoslovakia
- Height: 1.83 m (6 ft 0 in)
- Position: Defender

Senior career*
Years	Team	Apps	(Gls)
2005–2007	Brno	8	(0)
2006	→ České Budějovice (loan)	8	(0)
2006–2007	→ Opava (loan)		
2007–2010	Opava		
2010–2015	Slovácko	98	(1)
2015–2018	Znojmo	56	(2)

International career
2000	Czech Republic U17	5	(0)
- * Club domestic league appearances and goals

Radek Mezlík (born 20 May 1982) is a Czech football player who played over 100 games in the Czech First League, firstly with Brno and later Slovácko. He represented the Czech Republic at under-17 level. After playing for Slovácko for five years, Mezlík joined Znojmo for the 2015–16 season. He finished his career with Znojmo, leaving in July 2018 for health reasons.
