= Rostislav Šamánek =

Czech footballer

Personal information
- Date of birth: 9 August 1989 (age 37)
- Place of birth: Czechoslovakia
- Height: 1.73 m (5 ft 8 in)
- Position: Forward

Team information
- Current team: 1. FC Brno
- Number: 28

Youth career
- –2005: 1. FC Jemnicko

Senior career*
| Years | Team | Apps | (Gls) |
| 2006–2009 | Vysočina Jihlava | 1 | (0) |
| 2009– | 1. FC Brno | 12 | (1) |
- * Club domestic league appearances and goals as of 15 June 2011

Rostislav Šamánek (born 9 August 1989) is a Czech football player who currently plays for 1. FC Brno.
