= František Ševínský =

Czech footballer (born 1979)

Personal information
- Date of birth: 31 March 1979 (age 47)
- Place of birth: Prague, Czechoslovakia
- Height: 1.88 m (6 ft 2 in)
- Position: Defender

Youth career
- 1986–1993: Sokol Pacov
- 1993–1998: Bohemians Prague

Senior career*
Years	Team	Apps	(Gls)
1998–1999	FK Říčany		
1999–2000	Sparta Krč		
2001	Střížkov		
2001	Mogul Kolín		
2001–2004	Artmedia Petržalka	36	(3)
2004–2005	Drnovice	28	(1)
2005–2009	Mladá Boleslav	74	(3)
2009–2013	Viktoria Plzeň	76	(6)
2013	Mladá Boleslav	9	(0)

International career
1994	Czech Republic U15	4	(1)
1994	Czech Republic U16	6	(0)
- * Club domestic league appearances and goals

František Ševínský (often misspelled as Ševinský; born 31 March 1979) is a Czech football video analyst and retired professional footballer. He played as a defender, most notably for the Czech First League clubs FK Mladá Boleslav and FC Viktoria Plzeň.

== Career ==
Ševínský represented his country at youth level in U15 and U16 categories. In 2001, he played in the Czech National Football League for Mogul Kolín. From 2001 to 2004, he played for the Slovak club Artmedia Petržalka. He then returned to the Czech Republic and played for Drnovice in the 2004–05 season, but due to the club's bankruptcy he had to leave after just one season.

In 2005–2009, he played for Mladá Boleslav. He experienced the club's most successful era, helping it to 2nd and 3rd place in the league and playing in European cups.

Ševínský's most successful years were in 2009–2013, when he played for Viktoria Plzeň. He won the Czech First League with the club in the 2010–11 season and appeared in the UEFA Champions League.

== Coach and video analyst ==
After finishing his active football career in 2014, Ševínský became a coach of a AC Sparta Prague youth team. During the COVID-19 pandemic, he focused more deeply on video analysis of matches and became a full-time football video analyst. He worked as a video analyst for the Czech Republic national team. In 2025, he started to work for FC Zbrojovka Brno.

== Family ==
Ševínský has two sons. Adam Ševínský is a professional footballer, and his younger son plays football in youth categories (as of 2025).

== Honours ==
=== Club ===
FC Viktoria Plzeň

- Czech First League: 2010–11
- Czech Cup: 2009–10
