= Michal Valenta =

Czech footballer (born 1977)

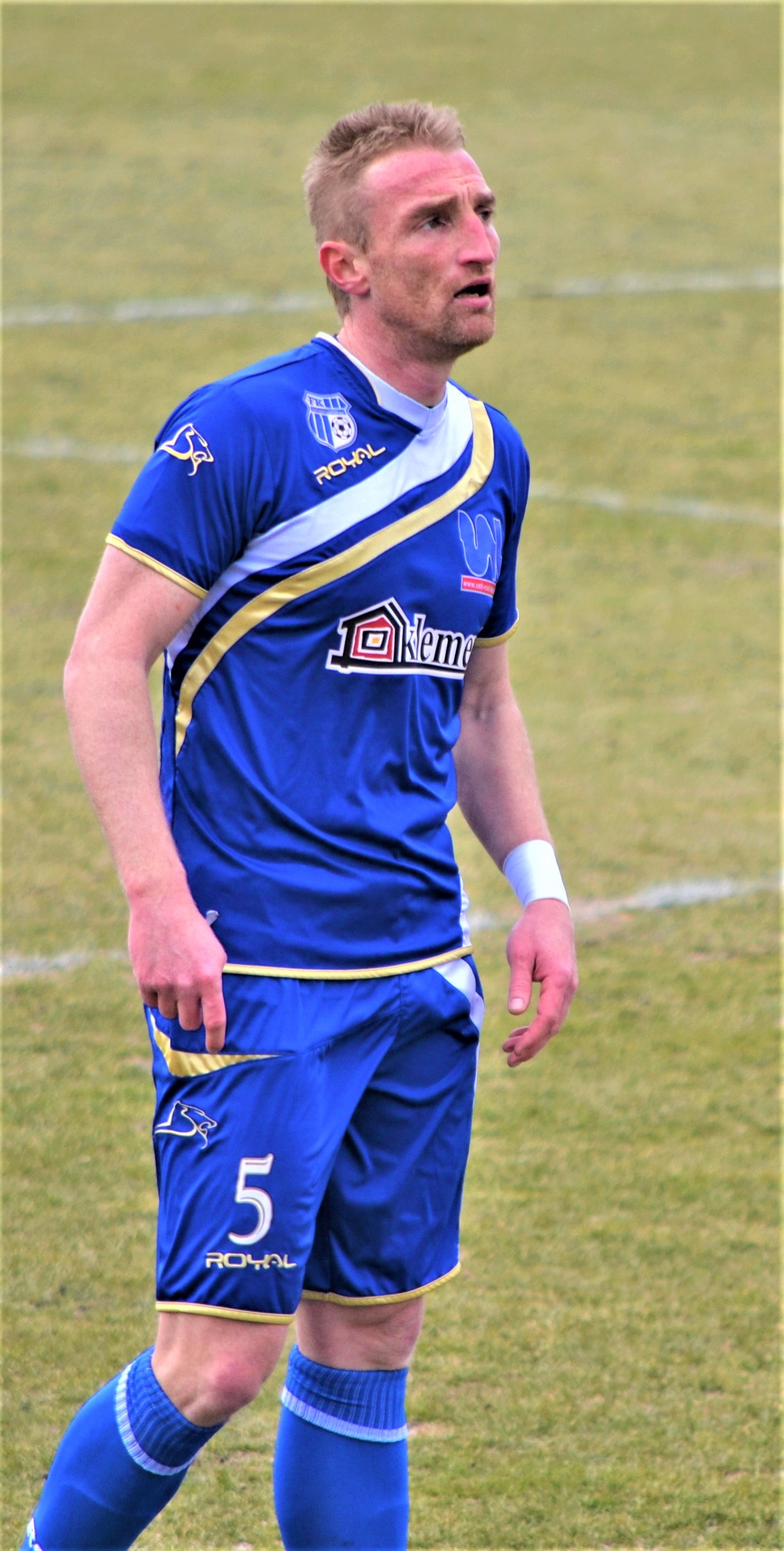

Personal information
- Date of birth: 8 June 1977 (age 49)
- Place of birth: Czechoslovakia
- Height: 1.84 m (6 ft 0 in)
- Position: Defender

Team information
- Current team: Ústí nad Labem
- Number: 5

Senior career*
Years	Team	Apps	(Gls)
2001–2004	Bohemians 1905	28	(0)
2004–	Ústí nad Labem	123	(19)
2006–2007	→ Teplice (loan)	16	(0)
- * Club domestic league appearances and goals as of 31 December 2012

Michal Valenta (born 8 June 1977) is a Czech football player who currently plays for Ústí nad Labem.
