= Daniel Kolář =

Czech footballer

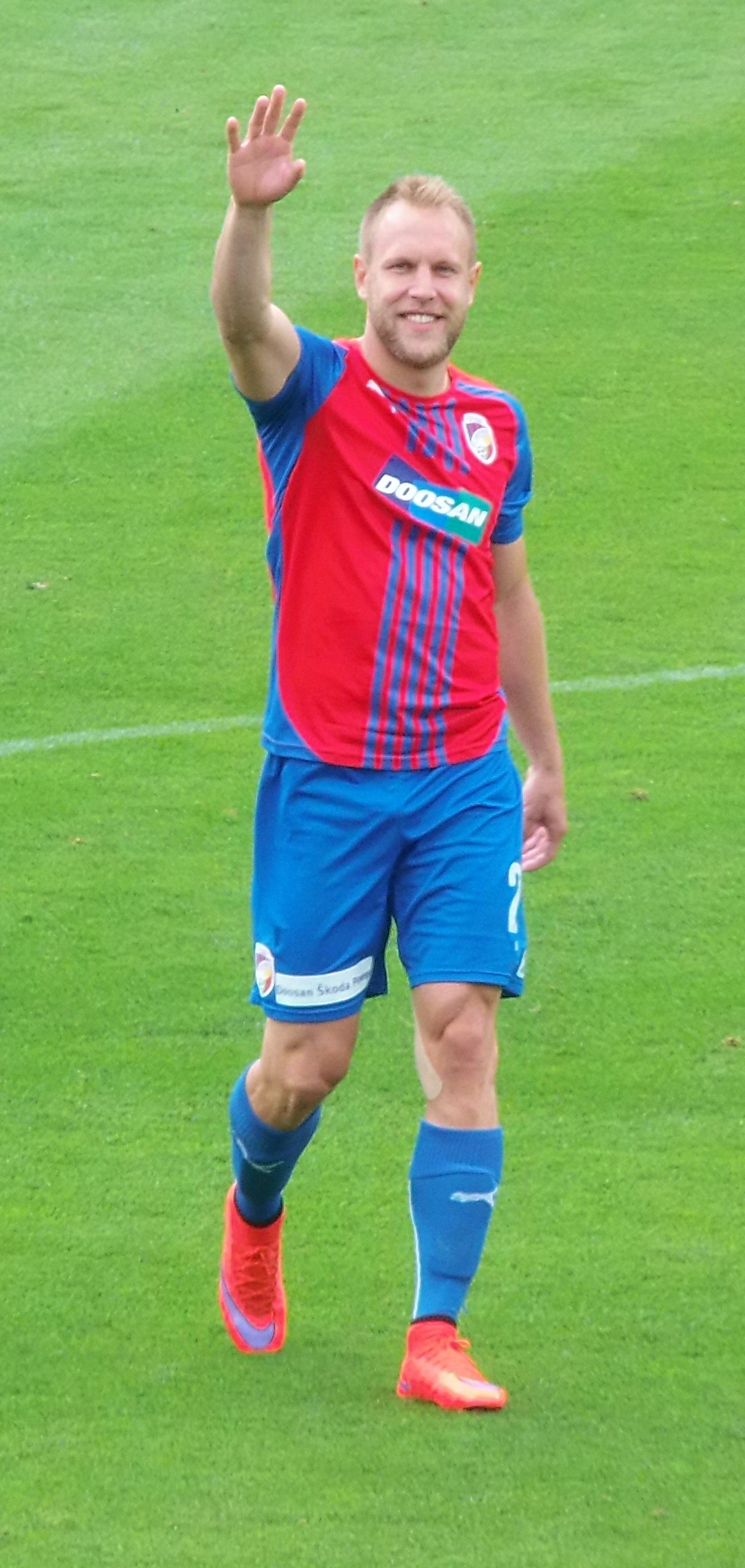
- Kolář in 2015

Personal information
- Date of birth: 27 October 1985 (age 41)
- Place of birth: Prague, Czechoslovakia
- Height: 1.80 m (5 ft 11 in)
- Position: Attacking midfielder

Youth career
- 1993–1994: SK Roztoky
- 1995–2003: Sparta Prague

Senior career*
Years	Team	Apps	(Gls)
2003–2008	Sparta Prague	54	(8)
2004–2005	→ Slovácko (loan)	13	(0)
2005	→ Blšany (loan)	14	(3)
2008–2016	Viktoria Plzeň	204	(60)
2016–2017	Gaziantepspor	8	(0)
2017–2019	Viktoria Plzeň	25	(6)
Total		318	(77)

International career
2006–2007	Czech Republic U21	10	(2)
2009–2016	Czech Republic	29	(2)
- * Club domestic league appearances and goals

Daniel Kolář (born 27 October 1985) is a Czech former professional footballer who played as an attacking midfielder, spending most of his career with Viktoria Plzeň. At international level, he made 29 appearances for Czech Republic national team scoring twice. After his retirement, he continued at Viktoria Plzeň as a sport manager.

In 2006, he won the Talent of the Year award at the Czech Footballer of the Year awards. He won the Czech Cup in 2010 and five time Czech First League title with FC Viktoria Plzeň and AC Sparta Prague.

== Career statistics ==
=== Club ===
Appearances and goals by club, season and competition
Club	Season	League			Cup		Continental		Total	
Club	Season	Division	Apps	Goals	Apps	Goals	Apps	Goals	Apps	Goals
Slovácko (loan)	2004–05	Czech First League	13	0	0	0	–		13	0
Chmel Blšany (loan)	2005–06	Czech First League	14	3	0	0	–		14	3
Sparta Prague	2005–06	Czech First League	7	1			0	0	7	1
Sparta Prague	2006–07	Czech First League	27	4			6	1	33	5
Sparta Prague	2007–08	Czech First League	17	3			2	0	19	3
Sparta Prague	2008–09	Czech First League	3	0			4	0	7	0
Sparta Prague	Total		54	8			12	1	66	9
Viktoria Plzeň	2008–09	Czech First League	22	5			–		22	5
Viktoria Plzeň	2009–10	Czech First League	26	5	8	2	–		34	7
Viktoria Plzeň	2010–11	Czech First League	29	13	4	0	2	0	35	13
Viktoria Plzeň	2011–12	Czech First League	29	6	2	0	14	4	45	10
Viktoria Plzeň	2012–13	Czech First League	21	7	2	0	11	3	34	10
Viktoria Plzeň	2013–14	Czech First League	23	7	4	0	15	5	42	12
Viktoria Plzeň	2014–15	Czech First League	25	11	0	0	2	1	27	12
Viktoria Plzeň	2015–16	Czech First League	26	6	4	0	8	1	38	7
Viktoria Plzeň	2016–17	Czech First League	3	0	–		3	0	6	0
Viktoria Plzeň	Total		204	60	24	2	55	14	283	76
Gaziantepspor	2016–17	Süper Lig	8	0	6	2	–		14	2
Viktoria Plzeň	2017–18	Czech First League	22	6	1	0	13	1	36	7
Viktoria Plzeň	2018–19	Czech First League	3	0	8	2	2	0	13	2
Viktoria Plzeň	Total		25	6	9	2	15	1	49	9
Career total			318	77	39	6	82	16	439	99

=== International ===
Scores and results list the Czech Republic's goal tally first, score column indicates score after each Kolář goal.

List of international goals scored by Daniel Kolář
No.	Date	Venue	Opponent	Score	Result	Competition
1	6 September 2011	Generali Arena, Prague, Czech Republic	Ukraine	4–0	4–0	Friendly
2	26 March 2013	Republican Stadium, Yerevan, Armenia	Armenia	3–0	3–0	2014 World Cup qualifier

== Honours ==
Viktoria Plzeň

- Czech First League: 2010–11, 2012–13, 2014–15, 2015–16
- Czech Cup: 2009–10
- Czech Supercup: 2011, 2015

Sparta Prague

- Czech First League: 2006–07

Individual

- Czech Talent of the Year: 2006
