= 2006–07 Czech First League =

14th season of top-tier football league in Czech Republic

Czech First League
- Season: 2006–07
- Champions: Sparta Prague
- Relegated: Marila Příbram; Slovácko
- Champions League: Sparta Prague; Slavia Prague
- UEFA Cup: Mladá Boleslav; Jablonec (via Domestic Cup)
- Intertoto Cup: Liberec
- Matches: 240
- Goals: 534 (2.23 per match)
- Top goalscorer: Luboš Pecka (16)
- Biggest home win: Brno 5–0 Č. Budějovice; Sparta Prague 5–0 Most
- Biggest away win: Viktoria Plzeň 0–4 Slavia Prague
- Highest scoring: Ostrava 5–1 Kladno; Mladá Boleslav 4–2 Č. Budějovice; Teplice 2–4 Slavia Prague; Most 4–2 Brno; Liberec 5–1 Příbram; Ostrava 5–1 Č. Budějovice
- Highest attendance: 20,565; Sparta Prague 1–0 Slavia Prague (23 April 2007)
- Lowest attendance: 1,620; Příbram 0–1 Brno (28 May 2007)
- Average attendance: 4,851

The 2006–07 Czech First League, known as the Gambrinus liga for sponsorship reasons, was the fourteenth season of Czech Republic's top-tier of football.

== Teams ==
=== Stadia and locations ===
Location of clubs in the 2006–07 Czech First League

=== Managerial changes ===
Team	Outgoing manager	Manner of departure	Date of vacancy	Incoming manager	Date of appointment
Sparta Prague	(Slovakia) Stanislav Griga	Sacked	31 August 2006	(Czech Republic) Michal Bílek	31 August 2006

== League table ==
Pos	Team	Pld	W	D	L	GF	GA	GD	Pts	Qualification or relegation
1	Sparta Prague (C)	30	18	8	4	44	20	+24	62	Qualification for Champions League third qualifying round
2	Slavia Prague	30	17	7	6	44	23	+21	58 (Note: Slavia Prague ahead of Mladá Boleslav and Slovan Liberec on head-to-head record; Slavia Prague: 7 pts, Mladá Boleslav: 5 pts, Slovan Liberec: 4 pts.)	Qualification for Champions League second qualifying round
3	Mladá Boleslav	30	17	7	6	48	27	+21	58	Qualification for UEFA Cup first round
4	Slovan Liberec	30	16	10	4	44	22	+22	58	Qualification for Intertoto Cup second round
5	Brno	30	13	7	10	34	32	+2	46 (Note: Brno ahead of Viktoria Plzeň and Baník Ostrava on head-to-head record; Brno: 7 pts, Viktoria Plzeň: 5 pts, Baník Ostrava: 4 pts.)	
6	Viktoria Plzeň	30	12	10	8	35	29	+6	46	
7	Baník Ostrava	30	12	10	8	43	33	+10	46	
8	Teplice	30	11	9	10	44	39	+5	42	
9	Jablonec	30	9	11	10	31	32	−1	38	Qualification for UEFA Cup second qualifying round (Note: Jablonec were qualified for the 2007–08 UEFA Cup as runners-up of the 2006–07 Czech Cup.)
10	Dynamo České Budějovice	30	9	7	14	28	46	−18	34	
11	Kladno	30	7	10	13	23	37	−14	31 (Note: Kladno ahead of Most on head-to-head record; Kladno–Most 2–2, Most–Kladno 1–3.)	
12	Most	30	5	16	9	31	41	−10	31	
13	Tescoma Zlín	30	5	12	13	21	34	−13	27	
14	Sigma Olomouc	30	6	8	16	29	43	−14	26	
15	Marila Příbram (R)	30	3	12	15	15	37	−22	21	Relegation to Czech 2. Liga
16	Slovácko (R)	30	3	10	17	20	39	−19	19	Relegation to Czech 2. Liga

Source: Fortuna liga
Rules for classification: 1) points; 2) head-to-head points; 3) head-to-head goal difference; 4) head-to-head goals scored; 5) goal difference; 6) number of goals scored.
(C) Champions; (R) Relegated

== Results ==
Home \ Away	OST	BRN	ČBU	JAB	KLA	PŘÍ	MBO	MOS	OLO	SLA	SLO	LIB	SPA	TEP	ZLÍ	PLZ
Baník Ostrava		1–2	5–1	3–0	5–1	1–1	2–0	1–0	3–1	0–2	1–0	1–1	2–2	1–1	1–0	1–1
Brno	2–1		5–0	3–2	1–0	2–0	2–0	1–1	2–1	1–0	1–0	1–2	1–2	2–2	1–0	1–2
Dynamo České Budějovice	2–2	0–0		1–0	0–2	2–1	0–3	0–0	2–0	1–2	1–0	0–2	2–0	1–2	1–1	2–1
Jablonec	1–1	0–1	0–0		3–0	0–0	0–2	2–2	2–0	1–0	3–1	1–1	0–0	2–1	1–1	2–1
Kladno	1–1	3–0	2–1	0–1		0–0	0–0	2–2	3–2	0–1	2–1	0–1	0–2	0–2	0–0	1–1
Marila Příbram	0–0	0–1	1–0	0–1	1–0		1–2	0–0	1–1	0–2	1–1	1–0	0–2	0–3	1–1	1–1
Mladá Boleslav	2–0	2–0	4–2	2–0	2–0	2–1		2–1	2–1	1–3	2–2	4–0	3–0	2–0	2–0	0–0
Most	2–1	4–2	1–2	3–1	1–3	1–1	1–1		1–1	2–0	2–0	0–0	1–1	0–0	0–0	1–1
Sigma Olomouc	1–3	1–0	0–0	1–1	2–0	0–0	3–1	2–0		1–2	2–1	0–1	0–2	1–1	3–0	1–3
Slavia Prague	2–1	2–1	2–0	2–2	0–0	1–1	1–1	3–0	3–0		0–0	0–2	0–0	3–2	2–1	0–1
Slovácko	1–2	0–0	0–1	1–1	0–1	2–0	0–2	1–1	1–0	0–0		0–1	0–1	2–2	0–0	0–2
Slovan Liberec	2–0	0–0	2–0	3–1	4–1	5–1	1–1	3–0	2–1	0–1	1–1		0–0	2–0	2–2	4–1
Sparta Prague	3–0	2–0	3–0	0–3	0–0	2–1	4–1	5–0	1–0	1–0	3–1	1–1		2–1	2–0	1–0
Teplice	1–2	0–0	1–3	1–0	2–0	1–0	2–0	2–2	2–2	2–4	3–2	3–0	1–1		1–0	1–2
Tescoma Zlín	0–0	3–0	2–1	0–0	0–0	1–0	0–2	2–1	1–1	1–2	1–2	0–0	2–0	1–4		1–2
Viktoria Plzeň	0–1	1–1	2–2	1–0	1–1	2–0	0–0	1–1	2–0	0–4	2–0	0–1	0–1	2–0	2–0	

Source: Fortuna liga
Legend: Blue = home team win; Yellow = draw; Red = away team win.

== Top goalscorers ==
Rank	Player	Club	Goals
1	(Czech Republic) Luboš Pecka	Mladá Boleslav	16
2	(Bosnia and Herzegovina) Edin Džeko	Teplice	13
2	(Czech Republic) David Střihavka	Baník Ostrava	13
4	(Czech Republic) Libor Došek	Sparta Prague	12
5	(Czech Republic) Stanislav Vlček	Slavia Prague	11
5	(Czech Republic) Luděk Zelenka	Brno	11
7	(Czech Republic) Vojtěch Schulmeister	Sigma Olomouc	10
8	(Czech Republic) Tomáš Krbeček	Viktoria Plzeň	9
9	(Czech Republic) František Rajtoral	Baník Ostrava	8

== Attendances ==
No.	Club	Average
1	Sparta Praha	11,848
2	Slovan Liberec	6,361
3	Baník Ostrava	6,283
4	Sigma	5,362
5	Baník Most	4,939
6	Viktoria Plzeň	4,836
7	Zbrojovka Brno	4,723
8	Slavia Praha	4,719
9	Slovácko	4,510
10	Mladá Boleslav	4,402
11	Dynamo Česke Budějovice	3,994
12	Jablonec	3,730
13	Teplice	3,698
14	Příbram	3,611
15	Zlín	2,520
16	Kladno	2,446

== See also ==
- 2006–07 Czech Cup
- 2006–07 Czech 2. Liga
