= FC Viktoria Plzeň =

Association football club in the Czech Republic

Viktoria Plzeň
- Full name: Football Club Viktoria Plzeň a.s.
- Founded: 11 June 1911; 115 years ago
- Ground: Doosan Arena
- Capacity: 11,700
- President: Adolf Šádek
- Head coach: Radoslav Kováč
- League: Czech First League
- 2025–26: 3rd of 16
- Website: fcviktoria.cz
Home colours	Away colours	Third colours

Football Club Viktoria Plzeň (Czech pronunciation: [ˈvɪktorɪja ˈpl̩zɛɲ]) is a Czech professional football club based in Plzeň. It plays in the Czech First League, the top division of football in the country.

As runner-up in the 1970–71 Czechoslovak Cup, the club competed in the following season's Cup Winners' Cup – the winner Spartak Trnava also won the championship and played in the European Cup. In 2010, Viktoria Plzeň competed in the UEFA Europa League after it won the 2009–10 Czech Cup.

The club won the Czech league for the first time in 2011, and participated in the 2011–12 UEFA Champions League group stage, won their first Champions League match, and finished on five points, qualifying for the Round of 32 in the 2011–12 UEFA Europa League. The club won its second Czech league title in the 2012–13 season.

In 2013–14, the team participated in the UEFA Champions League group stage and finished third. They then reached the round of 16 in UEFA Europa League before being eliminated by Lyon.

== History ==
=== Early history ===
In 1911, Jaroslav Ausobský, an official of the state railways, filed a request for the establishment of a new football club in Plzeň. In August 1911, the newly formed club Viktoria played their first match, losing 7–3 against Olympia Plzeň.

For the first 18 years of its existence, Viktoria Plzeň was a purely amateur club, although in 1922–23, they took their first foreign trip to Spain, where they won six out of nine matches. In June 1929, an extraordinary meeting of members agreed to go professional and enter the national professional league. Viktoria finished their first season in seventh place, but the very next season, improved and reached second place, which meant a first-ever promotion to the First League. In the 1934–35 Czechoslovak First League, Viktoria finished in fourth place and subsequently played in the 1935 Mitropa Cup, the top European club competition at the time. Two matches against Juventus brought Viktoria to the attention of European football at large. They drew 3–3 at home but lost 5–1 in Turin.

Viktoria played without success in the First League, being relegated for the 1938 season but returning to top competition the next year. The outbreak of World War II interrupted competition, notably through the absence of teams from Slovakia. In 1942, Viktoria fell again into the divisions, but again returned to the top league the next year, where they would remain until 1952. That same year, the club changed its name to Sokol Škoda Plzeň. For nine years they remained in the divisions, struggling to return to the First League, and in 1961, now under the name of Spartak Plzeň, achieved that promotion. The club was relegated and promoted frequently between the top two tiers until 1972, when as Škoda Plzeň they settled in the First League for eight years.

In 1971, Viktoria won the Czech Cup by drawing lots after the two-legged final ended 4–4 on aggregate and 5–5 in a limited penalty shootout against Sparta Prague B. They lost 7–2 on aggregate in the Czechoslovak Cup final against Slovak Cup winners Spartak Trnava, but as Trnava had won the league title that season, Viktoria was the country's entrant to the next season's European Cup Winners' Cup. The club's greatest honor is elimination in the first round by Bayern Munich, 7–2 on aggregate. From 1980 until the division of Czechoslovakia 13 years later, Viktoria moved frequently between the top two tiers again.

=== Recent history ===
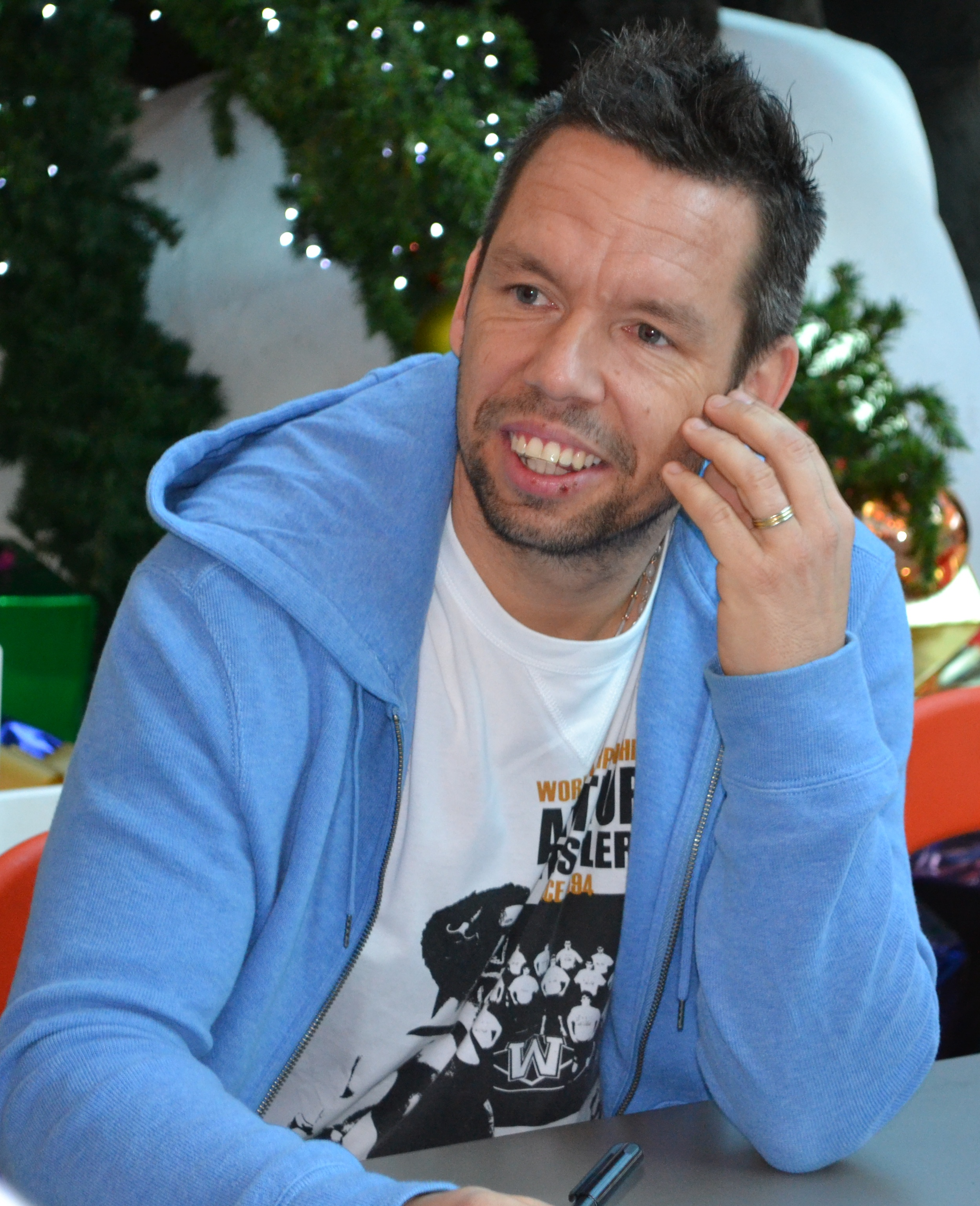
Pavel Horváth was voted as Viktoria's best player of all time at the club's centenary gala in 2012.

In 1992, the club returned to its historical name FC Viktoria Plzeň and the very next season, advanced to the first league, where it remained until 1999.

In the first years of the new millennium, Viktoria was owned by a foreign investor – Italian Football Company Ltd EAST. This situation lasted until March 2005, when 100% of the club's shares were purchased by local interests. The summer of 2005 also brought back relations with the Czech motor company Škoda, which had previously been the club's name sponsors.

On 18 May 2010, Viktoria won the Czech Cup final 2–1 against Jablonec, and returned to European competitions via the 2010–11 UEFA Europa League. Viktoria entered in the third qualifying round against Beşiktaş and held them 1–1 at home before losing 3–0 away.

Viktoria won its first ever league championship in 2010–11, finishing with 69 points to Sparta Prague's 68. The club therefore qualified for a play-off to the 2011–12 UEFA Champions League, in which they defeated Copenhagen 5–2 on aggregate. Viktoria were placed in Group H alongside reigning champions Barcelona and Milan, and reached third place in the group by recording a victory over BATE Borisov. This saw the club drop into the 2011–12 UEFA Europa League in the round of 32, where they lost 4–2 on aggregate to Schalke 04 after extra time.

The club's Stadion města Plzně was also rebuilt in 2011. The same year on 11 June, Viktoria celebrated together with fans in the courtyard of the Pilsner Urquell brewery for a centennial anniversary. In January 2012, the club held a festive gala for its centenary, and voted current midfielder Pavel Horváth as its greatest player of all time.

The 2011–12 season saw Viktoria finish in third place in the league, three points behind champions Slovan Liberec, to qualify for a third consecutive Europa League campaign. Starting in the second qualifying round, the club advanced past Metalurgi Rustavi of Georgia and Ruch Chorzów of Poland to set up a play-off against the Belgian club Lokeren, in which Viktoria advanced on away goals after a 2–2 aggregate draw. The club finished first in Group B, ahead of the tournament's reigning champions Atlético Madrid. In the round of 32, Viktoria were drawn against Napoli and won 3–0 away and 2–0 at home to advance to the last 16, where they played Fenerbahçe. Viktoria lost the home leg 1–0, and in the away leg (which was played behind closed doors due to the Istanbul club's fans' recent conduct) drew 1–1, resulting in their elimination. Viktoria won the Czech First League for a second time in the 2012–13 season.

In the 2014–15 season, Viktoria were involved in a title race between Sparta Prague and Jablonec. In the end, Viktoria emerged as league champions, finishing in front of second-placed Sparta Prague by 5 points. In the 2015–16 season, Viktoria became champions of the Czech First League for a fourth time.

In 2017, the club installed a dugout in the shape of a beer can after a deal with a local beer sponsor.

After narrowly missing out on the league title to SK Slavia Prague in the 2016-17 season, Viktoria Plzeň made a remarkable comeback the following year. Demonstrating consistent form and resilience, they clinched the championship, finishing 7 points ahead of Slavia Prague, who this time ended as runners-up.

Viktoria were named league champions for a sixth time in the 2021–22 season.

In the 2023–24 season, Viktoria reached the quarter-finals of the UEFA Europa Conference League. Viktoria reached top of their group consisting of Dinamo Zagreb, FC Astana and FC Ballkani, beating all of them to be the first Czech team in a UEFA competition to go 6 wins in the group stage while only conceding one goal. In the round of 16, Viktoria dispatched of Servette FC, before going out to Fiorentina after extra time in the quarter-finals.

== Historical names ==
- 1911 – SK Viktoria Plzeň (Sportovní klub Viktoria Plzeň)
- 1949 – Sokol Škoda Plzeň
- 1952 – Sokol ZVIL Plzeň (Sokol Závody Vladimíra Iljiče Lenina Plzeň)
- 1953 – DSO Spartak LZ Plzeň (Dobrovolná sportovní organizace Spartak Leninovy závody Plzeň)
- 1962 – TJ Spartak LZ Plzeň (Tělovýchovná jednota Spartak Leninovy závody Plzeň)
- 1965 – TJ Škoda Plzeň (Tělovýchovná jednota Škoda Plzeň)
- 1993 – FC Viktoria Plzeň (Football Club Viktoria Plzeň, a.s.)

== Players ==
=== Current squad ===
As of 8 September 2026.

Note: Flags indicate national team as defined under FIFA eligibility rules; some limited exceptions apply. Players may hold more than one non-FIFA nationality.

No.	Pos.	Nation	Player
1	GK	SVK	Dominik Ťapaj
2	DF	SVK	Tobiáš Pališčák
3	DF	SVK	Denis Vavro
5	DF	CZE	Karel Spáčil
6	MF	CZE	Lukáš Červ
7	FW	NGR	Salim Fago Lawal
9	MF	CZE	Denis Višinský
10	FW	GUI	Mohamed Toure
11	FW	CZE	Matěj Vydra
12	MF	CZE	Alexandr Sojka
13	GK	SVK	Marián Tvrdoň
14	DF	IRQ	Merchas Doski
17	MF	SVK	Patrik Hrošovský
18	MF	CZE	Tomáš Ladra

No.	Pos.	Nation	Player
19	MF	FRA	Cheick Souaré
20	MF	CZE	Jiří Panoš
21	DF	CZE	Václav Jemelka
22	DF	CZE	Jan Paluska
23	FW	GAM	Baboucarr Faal
25	FW	CZE	Christophe Kabongo
29	DF	CZE	Adam Gabriel
30	GK	CZE	Viktor Baier
36	MF	SRB	Stefan Pirgić
40	DF	LBR	Sampson Dweh
44	GK	AUT	Florian Wiegele
80	FW	GHA	Prince Kwabena Adu
98	MF	CZE	Filip Prebsl
99	MF	BIH	Amar Memić

=== Out on loan ===
Note: Flags indicate national team as defined under FIFA eligibility rules; some limited exceptions apply. Players may hold more than one non-FIFA nationality.

No.	Pos.	Nation	Player
—	MF	SLO	Adrian Zeljković (at MTK Budapest)
—	FW	TOG	Idjessi Metsoko (at Dundee United)
—	DF	CZE	Adam Kadlec (at Mladá Boleslav)
—	FW	NGR	James Bello (at Karviná)

No.	Pos.	Nation	Player
—	MF	CZE	Jakub Chalupa (at Kladno)
—	FW	CZE	Filip Růžička (at Kladno)
—	MF	CZE	Daniel Suchý (at Tatran Prešov)

== Player records in the Czech First League ==
As of 18 September 2026.

Highlighted players are in the current squad.

=== Most appearances ===
#	Name	Matches
1	(Czech Republic) David Limberský	393
2	(Czech Republic) Milan Petržela	267
2	(Czech Republic) Lukáš Hejda	267
4	(Czech Republic) Jan Kopic	241
5	(Czech Republic) Daniel Kolář	229
6	(Czech Republic) Radim Řezník	220
7	(Czech Republic) Tomáš Hořava	197
8	(Czech Republic) Jan Kovařík	195
9	(Czech Republic) Václav Procházka	188
9	(Czech Republic) Lukáš Kalvach	188

=== Most goals ===
#	Name	Goals
1	(Czech Republic) Daniel Kolář	66
2	(Slovakia) Marek Bakoš	54
3	(Czech Republic) Michael Krmenčík	45
3	(Czech Republic) Tomáš Chorý	45
5	(France) Jean-David Beauguel	43
6	(Czech Republic) Milan Petržela	38
7	(Czech Republic) Jan Kopic	36
7	(Czech Republic) Pavel Šulc	36
9	(Czech Republic) Pavel Horváth	35
10	(Slovakia) Michal Ďuriš	34

=== Most clean sheets ===
#	Name	Clean sheets
1	(Slovakia) Matúš Kozáčik	82
2	(Czech Republic) Aleš Hruška	34
2	(Czech Republic) Jindřich Staněk	34
4	(Czech Republic) Michal Čaloun	31
5	(Czech Republic) Michal Daněk	29

== Managers ==
- Rudolf Krčil (1963)
- Vlastimil Chobot (1967–68)
- Karel Kolský (1969–70)
- Jiří Rubáš (1970–75)
- Tomáš Pospíchal (1975–77)
- Jaroslav Dočkal (1977–78)
- Svatopluk Pluskal (1978–79)
- Josef Žaloudek (1979–??)
- Václav Rys
- Zdeněk Michálek (1993–95)
- Jaroslav Hřebík (1995–96)
- Antonín Dvořák (1996–97)
- Petr Uličný (1997–99)
- Milan Šíp (1999)
- Luboš Urban (1999–2000)
- Miroslav Koubek (Oct 2000 – Dec 2001)
- Petr Rada (Dec 2001 – Oct 2002)
- Zdeněk Michálek (Oct 2002 – May 2003)
- František Cipro (May 2003 – May 2004)
- Martin Pulpit (May 2004 – May 2005)
- Zdeněk Michálek (May 2005 – April 2006)
- František Straka (April 2006 – May 2006)
- Michal Bílek (July 2006 – Sept 2006)
- Stanislav Levý (Oct 2006 – April 2008)
- Karel Krejčí (April 2008 – May 2008)
- Jaroslav Šilhavý (July 2008 – Oct 2008)
- Pavel Vrba (Oct 2008 – Dec 2013)
- Dušan Uhrin Jr. (Dec 2013 – Aug 2014)
- Miroslav Koubek (Aug 2014 – Aug 2015)
- Karel Krejčí (Aug 2015 – May 2016)
- Roman Pivarník (May 2016 – April 2017)
- Zdeněk Bečka (April 2017 – June 2017)
- Pavel Vrba (Jun 2017 – Dec 2019)
- Adrián Guľa (Dec 2019 – May 2021)
- Michal Bílek (May 2021 – May 2023)
- Miroslav Koubek (June 2023 – Sep 2025)
- Marek Bakoš (Sep 2025 – Oct 2025)
- Martin Hyský (Oct 2025 – Aug 2026)
- Radoslav Kováč (Aug 2026 – present)

== History in domestic competitions ==
- 1993–1999 Czech First League
- 1999–2000 Czech 2. Liga
- 2000–2001 Czech First League
- 2001–2003 Czech 2. Liga
- 2003–2004 Czech First League
- 2004–2005 Czech 2. Liga
- 2005– Czech First League

- Seasons spent at Level 1 of the football league system: 27
- Seasons spent at Level 2 of the football league system: 4
- Seasons spent at Level 3 of the football league system: 0
- Seasons spent at Level 4 of the football league system: 0

=== Czech Republic ===
Season	League	Placed	Pld	W	D	L	GF	GA	GD	Pts	Cup	Super Cup
1993–94	1. liga	5th	30	12	11	7	35	23	+12	35	Quarter-finals	
1994–95	1. liga	9th	30	12	4	14	32	37	–5	40	Quarter-finals	
1995–96	1. liga	9th	30	11	6	13	33	34	–1	39	Round of 32	
1996–97	1. liga	11th	30	7	11	12	33	37	–4	32	Quarter-finals	
1997–98	1. liga	14th	30	9	6	15	37	47	–10	33	Quarter-finals	
1998–99	1. liga	15th	30	8	8	14	26	43	–17	32	Round of 32	
1999–00	2. liga	2nd	30	17	8	5	50	22	+28	59	Quarter-finals	
2000–01	1. liga	16th	30	4	9	17	30	65	–35	21	Round of 32	
2001–02	2. liga	4th	30	15	5	10	56	34	+22	50	Round of 32	
2002–03	2. liga	1st	30	17	7	6	47	27	+20	58	Round of 32	
2003–04	1. liga	16th	30	4	7	19	23	53	–30	19	Round of 16	
2004–05	2. liga	3rd	30	12	10	6	32	23	+9	46	Semi-finals	
2005–06	1. liga	14th	30	7	10	13	30	43	–13	31	Round of 64	
2006–07	1. liga	6th	30	12	10	8	35	29	+6	46	Quarter-finals	
2007–08	1. liga	9th	30	10	8	12	32	37	–5	38	Round of 16	
2008–09	1. liga	8th	30	11	10	9	45	38	+7	43	Quarter-finals	
2009–10	1. liga	5th	30	12	12	6	42	33	+9	48	Winners	
2010–11	1. liga	1st	30	21	6	3	70	28	+42	69	Quarter-finals	Runners-up
2011–12	1. liga	3rd	30	19	6	5	66	33	+33	63	Quarter-finals	Winners
2012–13	1. liga	1st	30	20	5	5	54	21	+33	65	Quarter-finals	
2013–14	1. liga	2nd	30	19	9	2	64	21	+43	66	Runners-up	Runners-up
2014–15	1. liga	1st	30	23	3	4	70	24	+46	72	Quarter-finals	Runners-up
2015–16	1. liga	1st	30	23	2	5	57	25	+32	71	Semi-finals	Winners
2016–17	1. liga	2nd	30	20	7	3	47	21	+26	67	Round of 16	
2017–18	1. liga	1st	30	20	6	4	55	23	+32	66	Round of 16	
2018–19	1. liga	2nd	35	24	6	5	57	32	+25	78	Round of 16	
2019–20	1. liga	2nd	35	23	7	5	68	24	+44	76	Semi-finals	
2020–21	1. liga	5th	34	17	7	10	60	45	+15	58	Runners-up	
2021–22	1. liga	1st	35	26	7	2	61	21	+40	85	Round of 16	
2022–23	1. liga	3rd	35	18	7	10	60	38	+22	61	Round of 32	
2023–24	1. liga	3rd	35	21	7	7	76	40	+36	70	Runners-up	
2024–25	1. liga	2nd	35	23	5	7	71	36	+35	74	Semi-finals	
2025–26	1. liga	3rd	35	18	9	8	60	38	+22	63	Quarter-finals	

== History in European competitions ==
The following is a list of the all-time statistics from Plzeň's games in the three UEFA tournaments it has participated in, as well as the overall total. The list contains the tournament, the number of seasons (S), games played (P), won (W), drawn (D) and lost (L). The statistics include qualification matches.

As of 7 September 2025.

Competition	S	Pld	W	D	L	GF	GA	GD
Champions League	4	53	22	9	22	82	105	-23
Cup Winners' Cup	1	2	0	0	2	1	7	–6
Europa League	8	58	27	12	19	90	69	+21
Conference League	2	12	9	1	2	24	12	+12
Total	15	125	58	22	45	197	193	+4

== Honours ==
=== National ===
- Czech First League
  - Winners (6): 2010–11, 2012–13, 2014–15, 2015–16, 2017–18, 2021–22
  - Runners-up (4): 2013–14, 2016–17, 2018–19, 2019–20
- Czech Cup
  - Winners (1): 2009–10
  - Runners-up (3): 2013–14, 2020–21, 2023–24
- Czech Supercup
  - Winners (2): 2011, 2015
  - Runners-up (3): 2010, 2013, 2014
- Czech 2. Liga
  - Winners (1): 2002–03

== Club records ==
=== Czech First League records ===
- Best position: 1st (2010–11, 2012–13, 2014–15, 2015–16, 2017–18, 2021–22)
- Worst position: 16th (2000–01, 2003–04)
- Biggest home win: Plzeň 7–0 Ústí nad Labem (2010–11), Plzeň 7–0 Teplice (2020–21)
- Biggest away win: Zlín 1–7 Plzeň (2023–24)
- Biggest home defeat: Plzeň 1–5 Drnovice (1997–98), Plzeň 0–4 Příbram (2003–04), Plzeň 0–4 Slavia (2006–07), Plzeň 0–4 Ostrava (2007–08), Plzeň 0–4 Olomouc (2011–12)
- Biggest away defeat: Ostrava 6–0 Plzeň (2005–06)
