= 2013–14 Czech First League =

21st season of top-tier football league in Czech Republic

Czech First League
- Season: 2013–14
- Champions: Sparta Prague
- Relegated: Sigma Olomouc; Znojmo
- Champions League: Sparta Prague
- Europa League: Viktoria Plzeň; Mladá Boleslav; Slovan Liberec
- Matches played: 240
- Goals scored: 673 (2.8 per match)
- Top goalscorer: Josef Hušbauer (18 goals)
- Best goalkeeper: Tomáš Vaclík (14 clean sheets)
- Biggest home win: Jablonec 6–0 Příbram (10 November 2013); Plzeň 6–0 Liberec (29 March 2014)
- Biggest away win: Slavia 0–7 Teplice (19 August 2013)
- Highest scoring: Jablonec 5–5 Znojmo (17 August 2013)
- Highest attendance: 19,089; Sparta 3–0 Slavia (12 April 2014)
- Lowest attendance: 155; Znojmo 0–2 Dukla (31 May 2014)
- Average attendance: 5,065

The 2013–14 Czech First League, known as the Gambrinus liga for sponsorship reasons, was the 21st season of the Czech Republic's top-tier football league. The season began on 19 July 2013 and ended on 31 May 2014. Sparta Prague won their 36th title on 4 May 2014, after defending champions Plzeň drew against Jablonec. They ended the season with a Czech league record of 79 points out of a possible 90, winning all of their home games, and losing only one away game and drawing a further four. Sigma Olomouc and Znojmo were relegated, the latter having played its top flight debut, and the former having played in every Czech first league season since its establishment in 1993.

== Teams ==
Hradec Králové and České Budějovice were relegated to the 2013–14 Czech 2. Liga after finishing last and second to last, respectively, in the 2012–13 season. Hradec Králové therefore returned to the second tier after three seasons in the top league, while České Budějovice left after a seven-year spell in the top flight.

The relegated teams were replaced by 2012–13 2. Liga winners Znojmo and runners-up Bohemians 1905. Bohemians thus returned to the top flight after a one-year absence. Znojmo, having never played in the top flight before, made their top-league début.

=== Stadiums and locations ===
Locations of clubs in the 2013–14 Czech First League

| Club | Location | Stadion | Capacity | 2012–13 position |
|---|---|---|---|---|
| Baník Ostrava | Ostrava | Bazaly | 17,372 | 14th |
| Bohemians 1905 | Prague | Ďolíček | 7,500 | 2L, 2nd |
| Dukla Prague | Prague | Stadion Juliska | 4,560 | 6th |
| FK Jablonec | Jablonec nad Nisou | Stadion Střelnice | 6,280 | 4th |
| FK Mladá Boleslav | Mladá Boleslav | Městský stadion (Mladá Boleslav) | 5,000 | 8th |
| 1. FK Příbram | Příbram | Na Litavce | 9,100 | 11th |
| Sigma Olomouc | Olomouc | Andrův stadion | 12,566 | 5th |
| Slavia Prague | Prague | Synot Tip Arena | 21,000 | 7th |
| 1. FC Slovácko | Uherské Hradiště | Městský fotbalový stadion Miroslava Valenty | 8,121 | 9th |
| Slovan Liberec | Liberec | Stadion u Nisy | 9,900 | 3rd |
| Sparta Prague | Prague | Generali Arena | 20,558 | 2nd |
| FK Teplice | Teplice | Na Stínadlech | 18,221 | 12th |
| Viktoria Plzeň | Plzeň | Stadion města Plzně | 13,000 | 1st |
| Vysočina Jihlava | Jihlava | Stadion v Jiráskově ulici | 4,075 | 10th |
| Zbrojovka Brno | Brno | Městský stadion (Brno) | 12,550 | 13th |
| 1. SC Znojmo | Znojmo | Městský stadion (Brno) ^{Note 1} | 12,550 | 2L, 1st |

Notes:

1. Městský stadion (Znojmo) does not meet the football association criteria, therefore Znojmo are ground-sharing in Brno. Znojmo played their final fixture against Dukla Prague at Stadion v Jiráskově ulici in Jihlava as Brno also had a home fixture on the same date.

=== Personnel and kits ===
Note: Flags indicate national team as has been defined under FIFA eligibility rules. Players may hold more than one non-FIFA nationality.

| Team | Manager^{1} | Captain | Kit manufacturer | Shirt sponsor |
|---|---|---|---|---|
| Baník Ostrava | (Czech Republic) Tomáš Bernady | (Czech Republic) Michal Frydrych | Nike | Vítkovice Machinery Group |
| Bohemians 1905 | (Czech Republic) Luděk Klusáček | (Czech Republic) Josef Jindřišek | adidas | Remal |
| Dukla Prague | (Czech Republic) Luboš Kozel | (Czech Republic) Patrik Gedeon | adidas | Staeg |
| Jablonec | (Czech Republic) Roman Skuhravý | (Czech Republic) Luboš Loučka | Umbro | Baumit |
| Mladá Boleslav | (Czech Republic) Karel Jarolím | (Czech Republic) David Jarolím | Nike | Škoda |
| Příbram | (Czech Republic) Petr Čuhel | (Czech Republic) Aleš Hruška | adidas | Startip |
| Sigma Olomouc | (Czech Republic) Martin Kotůlek | (Czech Republic) Aleš Škerle | adidas | Sigma Group |
| Slavia Prague | (Netherlands) Alex Pastoor | (Cape Verde) Fernando Maria Neves | Umbro | Chance |
| Slovácko | (Czech Republic) Svatopluk Habanec | (Czech Republic) Vít Valenta | Kappa | Z-GROUP Steel holding |
| Slovan Liberec | (Czech Republic) Jaroslav Šilhavý | (Czech Republic) Radoslav Kováč | Nike | none |
| Sparta Prague | (Czech Republic) Vítězslav Lavička | (Czech Republic) David Lafata | Nike | none |
| Teplice | (Czech Republic) Zdeněk Ščasný | (Czech Republic) Milan Matula | Umbro | AGC |
| Viktoria Plzeň | (Czech Republic) Dušan Uhrin, Jr. | (Czech Republic) Pavel Horváth | Puma | Doosan Group |
| Vysočina Jihlava | (Czech Republic) Petr Rada | (Czech Republic) Lukáš Vaculík | Hummel | PSJ |
| Zbrojovka Brno | (Czech Republic) Václav Kotal | (Czech Republic) Pavel Zavadil | Umbro | E-Motion |
| Znojmo | (Czech Republic) Leoš Kalvoda | (Bulgaria) Todor Yonov | adidas | Aventin |

- ^{1} According to current revision of List of Czech Football League managers

=== Managerial changes ===
| Team | Outgoing manager | Manner of departure | Date of vacancy | Table | Incoming manager | Date of appointment |
|---|---|---|---|---|---|---|
| Zbrojovka Brno | Ludevít Grmela | Sacked | 3 September 2013 | 15th | Václav Kotal | 3 September 2013 |
| Slavia Prague | Michal Petrouš | Resigned | 14 September 2013 | 13th | Miroslav Koubek | 18 September 2013 |
| Příbram | František Straka | Sacked | 1 October 2013 | 12th | Petr Čuhel | 7 October 2013 |
| Baník Ostrava | Erich Cviertna | Death | 5 October 2013 | 9th | Tomáš Bernady | 10 October 2013 |
| Viktoria Plzeň | Pavel Vrba | Signed by Czech Republic | 15 December 2013 | 2nd | Dušan Uhrin, Jr. | 17 December 2013 |
| Sigma Olomouc | Martin Kotůlek | Sacked | 18 December 2013 | 9th | Zdeněk Psotka | January 2014 |
| Slavia Prague | Miroslav Koubek | Sacked | 3 March 2014 | 10th | Alex Pastoor | 3 March 2014 |
| Bohemians 1905 | Jozef Weber | Sacked | 10 March 2014 | 16th | Luděk Klusáček | 10 March 2014 |
| Slovan Liberec | Jaroslav Šilhavý | Mutual consent | 16 April 2014 | 5th | David Vavruška | 16 April 2014 |
| Sigma Olomouc | Zdeněk Psotka | Sacked | 28 April 2014 | 13th | Ladislav Minář | 28 April 2014 |

== League table ==
| Pos | Team | Pld | W | D | L | GF | GA | GD | Pts | Qualification or relegation |
|---|---|---|---|---|---|---|---|---|---|---|
| 1 | Sparta Prague (C) | 30 | 25 | 4 | 1 | 78 | 19 | +59 | 79 | Qualification for Champions League second qualifying round |
| 2 | Viktoria Plzeň | 30 | 19 | 9 | 2 | 64 | 21 | +43 | 66 | Qualification for Europa League third qualifying round (Note: Since the winners of the 2013–14 Czech Cup, Sparta Prague, qualified for European competition based on league position, the spot awarded to the cup winners was passed to the third-placed team, and the spot awarded to the third-placed team was passed to the fourth-placed team.) |
| 3 | Mladá Boleslav | 30 | 14 | 8 | 8 | 54 | 38 | +16 | 50 | Qualification for Europa League second qualifying round |
| 4 | Slovan Liberec | 30 | 14 | 6 | 10 | 37 | 46 | −9 | 48 | Qualification for Europa League second qualifying round |
| 5 | Teplice | 30 | 13 | 7 | 10 | 51 | 35 | +16 | 46 | |
| 6 | Slovácko | 30 | 11 | 7 | 12 | 43 | 40 | +3 | 40 | |
| 7 | Dukla Prague | 30 | 10 | 8 | 12 | 35 | 37 | −2 | 38 | |
| 8 | Vysočina Jihlava | 30 | 10 | 7 | 13 | 45 | 50 | −5 | 37 (Note: Vysočina Jihlava ahead of Zbrojovka Brno on head-to-head record; Vysočina Jihlava–Zbrojovka Brno 2–1, Zbrojovka Brno–Vysočina Jihlava 1–0.) | |
| 9 | Zbrojovka Brno | 30 | 10 | 7 | 13 | 32 | 42 | −10 | 37 | |
| 10 | Baník Ostrava | 30 | 8 | 11 | 11 | 33 | 43 | −10 | 35 | |
| 11 | Jablonec | 30 | 9 | 7 | 14 | 43 | 53 | −10 | 34 (Note: Jablonec ahead of Zlín on head-to-head record; Jablonec–Příbram 6–0, Příbram–Jablonec 3–0.) | |
| 12 | Příbram | 30 | 9 | 7 | 14 | 34 | 49 | −15 | 34 | |
| 13 | Slavia Prague | 30 | 8 | 6 | 16 | 24 | 51 | −27 | 30 (Note: Slavia Prague ahead of Bohemians 1905 on head-to-head record; Slavia Prague–Bohemians 1905 1–0, Bohemians 1905–Slavia Prague 0–1.) | |
| 14 | Bohemians 1905 | 30 | 7 | 9 | 14 | 26 | 40 | −14 | 30 | |
| 15 | Sigma Olomouc (R) | 30 | 7 | 8 | 15 | 42 | 60 | −18 | 29 | Relegation to FNL |
| 16 | Znojmo (R) | 30 | 6 | 9 | 15 | 32 | 49 | −17 | 27 | Relegation to FNL |

Source: Fortuna liga
Rules for classification: 1) points; 2) head-to-head points; 3) head-to-head goal difference; 4) head-to-head goals scored; 5) goal difference; 6) number of goals scored.
(C) Champions; (R) Relegated

== Results ==
| Home \ Away | OST | B05 | DUK | JAB | MLA | PŘI | SIG | SLA | SLO | LIB | SPA | TEP | VPL | JIH | ZBR | ZNO |
|---|---|---|---|---|---|---|---|---|---|---|---|---|---|---|---|---|
| Baník Ostrava | | 1–3 | 2–0 | 0–4 | 2–1 | 1–1 | 1–1 | 2–0 | 0–1 | 3–0 | 1–1 | 0–0 | 1–2 | 3–1 | 2–1 | 1–1 |
| Bohemians 1905 | 0–0 | | 3–2 | 0–1 | 1–1 | 2–0 | 0–2 | 0–1 | 1–1 | 1–0 | 1–2 | 3–1 | 0–0 | 0–0 | 1–1 | 2–0 |
| Dukla Prague | 1–0 | 1–1 | | 1–1 | 1–1 | 1–1 | 4–0 | 0–1 | 1–1 | 0–1 | 1–3 | 3–1 | 0–3 | 0–3 | 2–1 | 1–1 |
| Jablonec | 1–0 | 1–2 | 1–4 | | 1–1 | 6–0 | 2–1 | 2–1 | 2–1 | 0–2 | 2–3 | 1–1 | 2–2 | 3–0 | 0–0 | 5–5 |
| Mladá Boleslav | 4–0 | 1–0 | 1–0 | 3–2 | | 1–1 | 2–2 | 3–1 | 2–0 | 4–0 | 0–4 | 1–0 | 1–2 | 3–1 | 5–2 | 5–1 |
| Příbram | 4–0 | 1–0 | 0–2 | 3–0 | 3–1 | | 3–2 | 0–0 | 3–2 | 3–1 | 0–1 | 0–4 | 2–4 | 5–0 | 2–1 | 1–1 |
| Sigma Olomouc | 2–3 | 2–1 | 1–2 | 0–1 | 1–1 | 0–0 | | 5–1 | 2–2 | 1–2 | 1–1 | 2–2 | 1–2 | 4–3 | 2–0 | 2–0 |
| Slavia Prague | 1–1 | 1–0 | 2–1 | 0–0 | 0–4 | 3–0 | 2–3 | | 1–1 | 2–1 | 0–2 | 0–7 | 0–2 | 1–2 | 0–0 | 2–1 |
| Slovácko | 2–2 | 1–0 | 0–1 | 1–0 | 0–2 | 1–1 | 3–1 | 3–0 | | 4–2 | 0–1 | 0–2 | 1–3 | 2–1 | 5–0 | 2–0 |
| Slovan Liberec | 3–2 | 1–0 | 0–1 | 3–0 | 2–2 | 1–0 | 1–1 | 2–1 | 2–1 | | 1–1 | 2–1 | 1–1 | 1–0 | 1–0 | 0–0 |
| Sparta Prague | 4–1 | 2–1 | 3–0 | 2–1 | 4–1 | 4–0 | 5–0 | 3–0 | 4–1 | 4–1 | | 2–0 | 1–0 | 4–1 | 4–0 | 3–0 |
| Teplice | 0–0 | 5–1 | 2–1 | 3–1 | 0–1 | 1–0 | 4–0 | 1–0 | 3–2 | 1–1 | 3–1 | | 1–0 | 4–2 | 0–1 | 1–3 |
| Viktoria Plzeň | 4–0 | 5–0 | 0–0 | 6–1 | 2–0 | 2–0 | 3–2 | 1–1 | 0–0 | 6–0 | 0–0 | 3–0 | | 1–1 | 1–1 | 3–2 |
| Vysočina Jihlava | 0–0 | 1–1 | 1–1 | 3–2 | 2–1 | 3–0 | 5–0 | 2–1 | 2–1 | 2–3 | 1–4 | 1–1 | 1–2 | | 2–1 | 4–0 |
| Zbrojovka Brno | 0–0 | 5–1 | 2–1 | 1–0 | 1–1 | 1–0 | 2–0 | 2–0 | 0–2 | 0–1 | 1–3 | 3–2 | 1–3 | 1–0 | | 2–0 |
| Znojmo | 0–4 | 0–0 | 0–2 | 4–0 | 2–0 | 3–0 | 2–1 | 0–1 | 1–2 | 4–1 | 0–2 | 0–0 | 0–1 | 0–0 | 1–1 | |

Source: Fortuna liga
Legend: Blue = home team win; Yellow = draw; Red = away team win.

== Top scorers ==
| Rank | Player | Club | Goals |
|---|---|---|---|
| 1 | (Czech Republic) Josef Hušbauer | Sparta Prague | 18 |
| 2 | (Czech Republic) David Lafata | Sparta Prague | 16 |
| 2 | (Czech Republic) Zbyněk Pospěch | Dukla Prague | 16 |
| 4 | (Republic of the Congo) Franci Litsingi | Teplice | 14 |
| 5 | (Bosnia and Herzegovina) Haris Harba | Vysočina Jihlava | 13 |
| 6 | (Bosnia and Herzegovina) Jasmin Šćuk | Mladá Boleslav | 12 |
| 6 | (Czech Republic) Stanislav Tecl | Viktoria Plzeň | 12 |
| 8 | (Bosnia and Herzegovina) Aidin Mahmutović | Teplice | 10 |
| 8 | (Czech Republic) Václav Vašíček | Znojmo | 10 |
| 8 | (Czech Republic) Milan Kerbr | Slovácko | 10 |

== Average home attendance by club ==
| Club | Average attendance |
|---|---|
| Sparta Prague | 11,340 |
| Viktoria Plzeň | 10,089 |
| Teplice | 6,994 |
| Baník Ostrava | 6,525 |
| Slavia Prague | 6,189 |
| Sigma Olomouc | 4,972 |
| Slovan Liberec | 4,678 |
| Slovácko | 4,660 |
| Bohemians 1905 | 4,199 |
| Zbrojovka Brno | 4,176 |
| Mladá Boleslav | 3,691 |
| Vysočina Jihlava | 3,276 |
| Příbram | 3,216 |
| Jablonec | 2,869 |
| Dukla Prague | 2,765 |
| Znojmo | 1,392 |

== See also ==
- 2013–14 Czech Cup
- 2013–14 Czech National Football League
