= 2012–13 Czech First League =

20th season of top-tier football league in Czech Republic

Czech First League
- Season: 2012–13
- Champions: Viktoria Plzeň
- Relegated: Dynamo České Budějovice; Hradec Králové
- Champions League: Viktoria Plzeň
- Europa League: Sparta Prague; Liberec; Baumit Jablonec
- Matches: 240
- Goals: 620 (2.58 per match)
- Top goalscorer: David Lafata (20 goals)
- Biggest home win: Slavia 5–0 Brno; Olomouc 6–1 Příbram
- Biggest away win: Příbram 0–4 Liberec; Teplice 0–4 Jablonec; Teplice 0–4 Slovácko
- Highest scoring: Olomouc 6–1 Příbram
- Highest attendance: 19,410; Sparta 3-1 Slavia (13 April 2013)
- Lowest attendance: 0 Sparta Prague 3–1 České Budějovice (19 August 2012)
- Average attendance: 4,797

The 2012–13 Czech First League, known as the Gambrinus liga for sponsorship reasons, was the 20th season of the Czech Republic's top-tier football league. The defending champions were Liberec, who won their third Czech First League title the previous season.

A number of games were postponed due to adverse weather conditions. On 18 March the game between Jihlava and Mladá Boleslav was postponed due to heavy snow. A second game was postponed, before, on 10 May 2013, the match between Dukla Prague and Brno became the third match to be postponed, this time due to a waterlogged pitch.

Title sponsor Gambrinus introduced Pivo za bůra, an initiative when after a team scored five goals in a league game, fans at the game received a voucher to buy a Gambrinus beer for the symbolic price of 5 Czech koruna before their next home match. During the course of the season, Slavia Prague (twice), Zbrojovka Brno, Sigma Olomouc and Dukla Prague all managed to score five or more goals in a single game to qualify fans in attendance for the offer. Gambrinus also awarded the millionth spectator of the season, a fan of Viktoria Plzeň, a voucher for 100 beers.

== Teams ==
Viktoria Žižkov and Bohemians 1905 were relegated to the 2012–13 Czech 2. Liga after finishing last and second to last, respectively, in the 2011–12 season. Žižkov therefore immediately returned to the second tier, while Bohemians left after a three-year spell in the top flight.

The relegated teams were replaced by 2011–12 2. Liga runners-up Jihlava and fourth placed Zbrojovka Brno, who were promoted in place of 2. Liga winners FK Ústí nad Labem, whose stadium did not satisfy league requirements. Brno thus returned to the top flight after a one-year absence. Jihlava, having last played in the top flight in the 2005–06 season, returned after a six-season absence.

=== Stadia and locations ===
Locations of clubs in the 2012–13 Czech First League

Club	Location	Stadium	Capacity	2011–12 position
Baník Ostrava	Ostrava	Bazaly	17,372	14th
Dukla Prague	Prague	Stadion Juliska	8,150	6th
Dynamo České Budějovice	České Budějovice	E-On Stadion	6,681	10th
FC Hradec Králové	Hradec Králové	Všesportovní stadion	7,220	13th
FK Jablonec	Jablonec	Stadion Střelnice	6,280	8th
FK Mladá Boleslav	Mladá Boleslav	Městský stadion (Mladá Boleslav)	5,000	4th
1. FK Příbram	Příbram	Na Litavce	9,100	9th
Sigma Olomouc	Olomouc	Andrův stadion	12,566	11th
Slavia Prague	Prague	Eden Arena	21,000	12th
1. FC Slovácko	Uherské Hradiště	Městský fotbalový stadion Miroslava Valenty	8,121	7th
Slovan Liberec	Liberec	Stadion u Nisy	9,900	1st
Sparta Prague	Prague	Generali Arena	20,558	2nd
FK Teplice	Teplice	Na Stínadlech	18,221	5th
Viktoria Plzeň	Plzeň	Stadion města Plzně	11,700	3rd
Vysočina Jihlava	Jihlava	Stadion v Jiráskově ulici	4,075	2L, 2nd
Zbrojovka Brno	Brno	Městský stadion (Brno)	12,550	2L, 4th

=== Personnel and kits ===
Note: Flags indicate national team as has been defined under FIFA eligibility rules. Players may hold more than one non-FIFA nationality.

Team	Manager^{1}	Captain	Kit manufacturer	Shirt sponsor
Baník Ostrava	(Czech Republic) TBD To be determined	(Czech Republic) Martin Lukeš	Joma	Vítkovice Machinery Group
Dukla Prague	(Czech Republic) Luboš Kozel	(Czech Republic) Patrik Gedeon	adidas	Staeg
Dynamo České Budějovice	(Czech Republic) TBD To be determined	(Czech Republic) David Horejš	adidas	AVE
Hradec Králové	(Czech Republic) Luboš Prokopec	(Czech Republic) Roman Fischer	Jako	City of Hradec Králové
Jablonec	(Czech Republic) Václav Kotal	(Czech Republic) Petr Pavlík	Nike	Baumit
Mladá Boleslav	(Czech Republic) Ladislav Minář	(Czech Republic) Marek Kulič	Nike	Škoda
Příbram	(Czech Republic) František Straka	(Czech Republic) Aleš Hruška	adidas	Startip
Sigma Olomouc	(Czech Republic) Roman Pivarník	(Czech Republic) Radim Kučera	adidas	Tipsport
Slavia Prague	(Czech Republic) Michal Petrouš	(Czech Republic) Lukáš Jarolím	Umbro	Synot Tip
Slovácko	(Czech Republic) Svatopluk Habanec	(Czech Republic) Vít Valenta	Kappa	Z-GROUP Steel holding
Slovan Liberec	(Czech Republic) Jaroslav Šilhavý	(Czech Republic) Tomáš Janů	Nike	Fortuna
Sparta Prague	(Czech Republic) Vítězslav Lavička	(Czech Republic) Marek Matějovský	Nike	Fortuna
Teplice	(Czech Republic) Zdeněk Ščasný	(Czech Republic) Petr Lukáš	Umbro	AGC
Viktoria Plzeň	(Czech Republic) Pavel Vrba	(Czech Republic) Pavel Horváth	Puma	Doosan Group
Vysočina Jihlava	(Czech Republic) František Komňacký	(Czech Republic) Stanislav Tecl	hummel	PSJ
Zbrojovka Brno	(Czech Republic) Ludevít Grmela	(Czech Republic) Petr Švancara	Umbro	E-Motion

- ^{1} According to current revision of List of Czech Football League managers

=== Managerial changes ===
Team	Outgoing manager	Manner of departure	Date of vacancy	Table	Incoming manager	Date of appointment
Slovácko	(Czech Republic) Miroslav Soukup	Sacked	14 August 2012	11th	(Czech Republic) Svatopluk Habanec (Note: Slovácko manager Miroslav Soukup was sacked on 14 August. Assistant manager Jíří Dekař took charge of the team's next match, against Dukla, which was just three days later, before the arrival of new boss Svatopluk Habanec.)	20 August 2012
Příbram	(Czech Republic) David Vavruška	Sacked	29 August 2012	16th	(Slovakia) Karol Marko	29 August 2012
České Budějovice	(Czech Republic) František Cipro	Sacked	3 September 2012	16th	(Czech Republic) Miroslav Soukup	3 September 2012
Mladá Boleslav	(Czech Republic) Miroslav Koubek	Resigned	15 September 2012	12th	(Czech Republic) Ladislav Minář	17 September 2012
Teplice	(Czech Republic) Lukáš Přerost	Resigned	29 September 2012	12th	(Czech Republic) Zdeněk Ščasný	2 October 2012
Baník Ostrava	(Czech Republic) Radoslav Látal	Sacked	30 October 2012	16th	(Czech Republic) Martin Pulpit	30 October 2012
České Budějovice	(Czech Republic) Miroslav Soukup	Sacked	19 February 2013	15th	(Note: České Budějovice manager Miroslav Soukup was sacked on 19 February. Coaches Martin Vozábal and Pavol Švantner took over on a caretaker basis until a permanent replacement could be selected.)	
Příbram	(Slovakia) Karol Marko	Sacked	10 March 2013	16th	(Czech Republic) František Straka	10 March 2013
Brno	(Czech Republic) Petr Čuhel	Sacked	9 April 2013	13th	(Czech Republic) Ludevít Grmela	9 April 2013
Hradec Králové	(Czech Republic) Jiří Plíšek	Sacked	21 April 2013	15th	(Czech Republic) Luboš Prokopec	21 April 2013
Slavia Prague	(Czech Republic) Petr Rada	Mutual consent	30 April 2013	8th	(Czech Republic) Michal Petrouš	(Note: Slavia manager Petr Rada was sacked on 30 April. Youth coach Michal Petrouš was announced as in temporary charge for the remaining five games of the season.)
Jablonec	(Czech Republic) Václav Kotal	Sacked	5 May 2013	5th	(Note: Jablonec manager Václav Kotal was sacked on 5 May. Youth coaches Roman Skuhravý and Pavel Drsek were announced as in temporary charge for the last four games of the season.)	
Olomouc	(Czech Republic) Roman Pivarník	Sacked	6 May 2013	4th	(Note: Olomouc manager Roman Pivarník was sacked on 6 May. Assistant manager Martin Kotůlek was appointed as caretaker manager for the last four games of the season.)	

== League table ==
Pos	Team	Pld	W	D	L	GF	GA	GD	Pts	Qualification or relegation
1	Viktoria Plzeň (C)	30	20	5	5	54	21	+33	65	Qualification for Champions League second qualifying round
2	Sparta Prague	30	19	6	5	55	23	+32	63	Qualification for Europa League second qualifying round
3	Slovan Liberec	30	16	6	8	46	34	+12	54	Qualification for Europa League second qualifying round
4	Jablonec	30	13	10	7	49	41	+8	49	Qualification for Europa League third qualifying round (Note: Jablonec won the 2012–13 Czech Cup and qualified for the third qualifying round of the UEFA Europa League.)
5	Sigma Olomouc	30	13	8	9	38	29	+9	47	
6	Dukla Prague	30	11	13	6	48	37	+11	46	
7	Slavia Prague	30	11	9	10	41	33	+8	42	
8	Mladá Boleslav	30	10	8	12	34	43	−9	38	
9	Slovácko	30	10	7	13	37	41	−4	37	
10	Vysočina Jihlava	30	7	15	8	36	42	−6	36	
11	Příbram	30	7	11	12	27	39	−12	32 (Note: Příbram ahead of Teplice and Zbrojovka Brno on head-to-head record; Příbram 7 pts, Teplice 5 pts, Zbrojovka Brno 4 pts.)	
12	Teplice	30	8	8	14	36	47	−11	32	
13	Zbrojovka Brno	30	9	5	16	34	53	−19	32	
14	Baník Ostrava	30	7	8	15	34	44	−10	29	
15	Dynamo České Budějovice (R)	30	7	5	18	24	49	−25	26	Relegation to FNL
16	Hradec Králové (R)	30	5	10	15	27	44	−17	25	Relegation to FNL

Source: Fortuna liga
Rules for classification: 1) points; 2) head-to-head points; 3) head-to-head goal difference; 4) head-to-head goals scored; 5) goal difference; 6) number of goals scored.
(C) Champions; (R) Relegated

== Results ==
Home \ Away	OST	DUK	ČBU	HRK	JAB	MLA	PŘI	SIG	SLA	SLO	LIB	SPA	TEP	VPL	JIH	ZBR
Baník Ostrava		2–2	0–0	3–0	0–1	2–2	2–0	1–2	2–2	2–1	0–1	0–1	3–2	1–3	1–0	1–1
Dukla Prague	2–0		4–0	1–0	5–1	2–1	1–0	0–0	0–0	2–2	3–0	1–1	4–0	1–4	2–2	3–2
Dynamo České Budějovice	1–2	1–1		1–0	2–1	0–1	0–1	1–0	2–1	0–0	0–2	0–2	3–2	0–1	2–1	1–1
Hradec Králové	1–1	0–3	0–1		2–2	2–2	0–0	0–2	3–2	2–3	2–2	1–2	2–0	0–3	1–1	2–0
Jablonec	2–0	2–2	2–1	3–2		2–3	2–2	2–1	0–0	4–1	1–0	1–2	0–0	1–3	1–1	2–0
Mladá Boleslav	2–0	3–0	3–2	1–0	1–1		1–0	0–1	1–0	2–0	2–3	1–1	0–4	0–2	1–3	1–0
Příbram	2–1	1–1	1–1	0–0	3–3	1–1		0–2	2–0	0–1	0–4	0–0	3–1	1–0	2–2	2–0
Sigma Olomouc	1–0	2–1	1–0	1–1	0–1	2–2	6–1		2–1	2–0	3–0	0–3	0–2	0–1	3–0	1–1
Slavia Prague	0–2	0–0	3–0	3–0	5–1	1–1	2–1	1–1		1–0	3–1	1–0	2–0	0–1	3–3	5–0
Slovácko	2–0	0–0	2–0	1–1	0–1	3–1	0–1	1–1	3–0		0–3	1–4	2–1	0–2	3–0	0–1
Slovan Liberec	2–2	3–2	3–1	1–0	1–0	2–0	1–1	1–0	0–0	3–2		2–0	3–1	1–2	1–1	2–0
Sparta Prague	2–0	3–0	3–1	1–0	2–2	4–0	2–1	1–2	3–1	4–0	2–1		1–0	1–0	2–2	2–0
Teplice	3–2	1–1	4–0	0–2	0–4	1–0	0–0	1–1	1–1	0–4	3–0	0–3		1–1	3–1	2–0
Viktoria Plzeň	1–1	4–0	3–2	3–0	1–1	2–0	2–0	3–0	0–1	0–0	1–2	1–0	2–1		1–0	2–3
Vysočina Jihlava	3–2	1–1	1–0	0–0	0–1	1–0	2–1	1–1	3–1	1–1	0–0	1–1	1–1	1–1		2–0
Zbrojovka Brno	2–1	1–3	3–1	1–3	1–4	1–1	1–0	2–0	0–1	1–3	2–1	3–2	1–1	1–3	5–1	

Source: Fortuna liga
Legend: Blue = home team win; Yellow = draw; Red = away team win.

== Season statistics ==
=== Top scorers ===
Rank	Player	Club	Goals
1	(Czech Republic) David Lafata	Sparta Prague (Note: includes 13 goals for Jablonec)	20
2	(Czech Republic) Václav Kadlec	Sparta Prague	14
2	(Czech Republic) Michal Ordoš	Sigma Olomouc	14
4	(Czech Republic) Libor Došek	Slovácko	13
5	(Bosnia and Herzegovina) Aidin Mahmutović	Teplice	12
6	(Slovakia) Marek Bakoš	Viktoria Plzeň	10
6	(Czech Republic) Stanislav Tecl	Viktoria Plzeň (Note: includes 10 goals for Vysočina Jihlava)	10
8	(Czech Republic) Zbyněk Pospěch	Dukla Prague	9
9	(Czech Republic) Tomáš Borek	Dukla Prague	8
9	(Czech Republic) Tomáš Čížek	Jablonec	8
9	(Slovakia) Karol Kisel	Slavia Prague	8
9	(Czech Republic) Michael Rabušic	Slovan Liberec	8
9	(Czech Republic) Jiří Štajner	Slovan Liberec	8

== Attendances ==
Rank	Club	Average	Highest
1	Viktoria Plzeň	10,047	11,722
2	Sparta Praha	8,786	19,410
3	Baník Ostrava	7,805	14,774
4	Slavia Praha	6,942	15,654
5	Sigma Olomouc	5,429	7,970
6	Slovácko	4,790	6,532
7	Zbrojovka Brno	4,457	8,082
8	Slovan Liberec	4,238	9,215
9	Hradec Králové	4,082	6,947
10	Teplice	3,536	6,450
11	Vysočina Jihlava	3,248	4,150
12	Mladá Boleslav	2,975	4,786
13	Příbram	2,954	5,682
14	Jablonec	2,753	5,958
15	České Budějovice	2,534	3,652
16	Dukla Praha	2,191	4,257

== See also ==
- 2012–13 Czech Cup
- 2012–13 Czech 2. Liga
