= 2010–11 Czech First League =

18th season of top-tier football league in Czech Republic

Czech First League
- Season: 2010–11
- Champions: Viktoria Plzeň; 1st title
- Relegated: Zbrojovka Brno; Ústí nad Labem
- Champions League: Viktoria Plzeň
- Europa League: Sparta Prague; Jablonec; Mladá Boleslav (via Domestic Cup)
- Matches: 240
- Goals: 634 (2.64 per match)
- Top goalscorer: David Lafata (19 goals)
- Biggest home win: Brno 7–0 Slovácko; Plzeň 7–0 Ústí n. L. Jablonec 7–0 Hradec Králové
- Biggest away win: Ústí n. L. 0–5 Plzeň; Brno 0–5 Sparta
- Highest scoring: Liberec 6–2 Teplice
- Highest attendance: 18,873; Sparta Prague 2–0 Slavia Prague (11 April 2011)
- Lowest attendance: 0 Slavia Prague 3–2 Příbram (16 May 2011); 0 Slavia Prague 3–0 Bohemians 1905 (28 May 2011)
- Average attendance: 4,473

The 2010–11 Czech First League season, known as the Gambrinus liga for sponsorship reasons, was the 18th edition of the top flight Czech First League annual football tournament. It began on 16 July 2010 and finished on 28 May 2011. Sparta Prague were the 2010 champions, their 11th Czech Republic championship.

== Teams ==
FK Bohemians and SK Kladno were relegated to the 2010–11 Czech 2. Liga after finishing last and second to last, respectively, in the 2009–10 season; Bohemians were denied a license to play professional football the following season and were thus further demoted to the Bohemian Football League (third division) in June 2010. The relegated teams were replaced by 2009–10 2. Liga champions FC Hradec Králové and runners-up FK Ústí nad Labem.

Furthermore, 1. FC Brno was renamed FC Zbrojovka Brno effective to the beginning of this season. Following trouble at their Czech Cup semi-final match, which was abandoned at half time and awarded 3–0 to the visiting team, SK Slavia Prague were fined 750,000 CZK and ordered to play three home games behind closed doors. Since there were only two home matches left in the season, one was suspended until the next season.

=== Stadia and locations ===
Locations of clubs in the 2010–11 Czech First League

| Club | Location | Stadium | Capacity | 2009–10 position |
|---|---|---|---|---|
| Baník Ostrava | Ostrava | Bazaly | 17,372 | 3rd |
| Bohemians 1905 | Prague | Synot Tip Arena ^{Note 1} | 21,000 | 12th |
| Dynamo České Budějovice | České Budějovice | E-On Stadion | 6,746 | 13th |
| FC Hradec Králové | Hradec Králové | Všesportovní stadion | 6,000 | 2. Liga, 1st |
| FK Jablonec | Jablonec | Stadion Střelnice | 6,280 | 2nd |
| FK Mladá Boleslav | Mladá Boleslav | Městský stadion (Mladá Boleslav) | 5,000 | 8th |
| 1. FK Příbram | Příbram | Na Litavce | 9,100 | 10th |
| Sigma Olomouc | Olomouc | Andrův stadion | 12,072 | 6th |
| Slavia Prague | Prague | Synot Tip Arena | 21,000 | 7th |
| 1. FC Slovácko | Uherské Hradiště | Městský fotbalový stadion Miroslava Valenty | 8,121 | 14th |
| Slovan Liberec | Liberec | Stadion u Nisy | 9,900 | 9th |
| Sparta Prague | Prague | Generali Arena | 20,558 | 1st |
| FK Teplice | Teplice | Na Stínadlech | 18,221 | 4th |
| FK Ústí nad Labem | Ústí nad Labem | Na Stínadlech ^{Note 2} | 18,221 | 2. Liga, 2nd |
| Viktoria Plzeň | Plzeň | Stadion města Plzně | 7,842 | 5th |
| Zbrojovka Brno | Brno | Městský stadion (Brno) | 8,065 | 11th |

Notes:

1. Ďolíček stadion did not meet the football association criteria, therefore Bohemians were forced to play at Synot Tip Arena.
2. Městský stadion did not meet the football association criteria, therefore Ústí nad Labem was forced to play at the stadium of FK Teplice.

=== Managerial changes ===
| Team | Outgoing manager | Manner of departure | Date of vacancy | Table | Incoming manager | Date of appointment |
|---|---|---|---|---|---|---|
| Příbram | (Czech Republic) Martin Hřídel | Sacked | 28 September 2010 | 14th | (Czech Republic) Roman Nádvorník | 4 October 2010 |
| Slavia Prague | (Czech Republic) Karel Jarolím | Mutual consent | 29 September 2010 | 12th | (Czech Republic) Michal Petrouš | 29 September 2010 |
| Baník Ostrava | (Czech Republic) Miroslav Koubek | Sacked | 25 October 2010 | 14th | (Slovakia) Karol Marko | 8 November 2010 |
| Slovan Liberec | (Czech Republic) Josef Petřík | Resigned | 26 October 2010 | 11th | (Czech Republic) Petr Rada | 26 October 2010 |
| Brno | (Czech Republic) Karel Večeřa | Sacked | 14 April 2011 | 15th | (Czech Republic) René Wagner | 14 April 2011 |
| Příbram | (Czech Republic) Roman Nádvorník | Sacked | 26 April 2011 | 14th | (Czech Republic) David Vavruška | 26 May 2011 |
| Mladá Boleslav | (Czech Republic) Karel Stanner | Resigned | 18 May 2011 | 14th | (Czech Republic) Miroslav Koubek | 28 May 2011 |

- ^1 Příbram coach Roman Nádvorník was sacked on 26 April 2011. Two members of staff at the club, David Vavruška and František Kopač, were appointed to serve as caretaker managers until the end of the season. Exactly one month later, on 26 May, David Vavruška was appointed manager of the club on a permanent basis.
- ^2 Mladá Boleslav appointed sporting director Ladislav Minář to the position of caretaker manager until the end of the season. Following the end of the season, Miroslav Koubek took over.

== League table ==
| Pos | Team | Pld | W | D | L | GF | GA | GD | Pts | Qualification or relegation |
|---|---|---|---|---|---|---|---|---|---|---|
| 1 | Viktoria Plzeň (C) | 30 | 21 | 6 | 3 | 70 | 28 | +42 | 69 | Qualification for Champions League second qualifying round |
| 2 | Sparta Prague | 30 | 22 | 2 | 6 | 54 | 21 | +33 | 68 | Qualification for Europa League third qualifying round |
| 3 | Jablonec | 30 | 17 | 7 | 6 | 65 | 34 | +31 | 58 | Qualification for Europa League second qualifying round |
| 4 | Sigma Olomouc | 30 | 14 | 5 | 11 | 47 | 29 | +18 | 47 | |
| 5 | Mladá Boleslav | 30 | 13 | 7 | 10 | 49 | 40 | +9 | 46 | Qualification for Europa League third qualifying round (Note: Mladá Boleslav won the 2010–11 Czech Cup and qualified for the third qualifying round of the UEFA Europa League.) |
| 6 | Bohemians 1905 | 30 | 12 | 7 | 11 | 33 | 33 | 0 | 43 (Note: Bohemians 1905 ahead of Slovan Liberec on head-to-head record; Bohemians 1905–Slovan Liberec 3–1, Slovan Liberec–Bohemians 1905 1–0.) | |
| 7 | Slovan Liberec | 30 | 12 | 7 | 11 | 45 | 36 | +9 | 43 | |
| 8 | Hradec Králové | 30 | 11 | 8 | 11 | 26 | 36 | −10 | 41 | |
| 9 | Slavia Prague | 30 | 9 | 13 | 8 | 41 | 36 | +5 | 40 | |
| 10 | Teplice | 30 | 10 | 9 | 11 | 39 | 46 | −7 | 39 | |
| 11 | Dynamo České Budějovice | 30 | 7 | 12 | 11 | 30 | 48 | −18 | 33 | |
| 12 | Slovácko | 30 | 8 | 7 | 15 | 27 | 43 | −16 | 31 (Note: Slovácko ahead of Příbram on head-to-head record; Slovácko–Příbram 2–0, Příbram–Slovácko 0–1.) | |
| 13 | Příbram | 30 | 8 | 7 | 15 | 22 | 36 | −14 | 31 | |
| 14 | Baník Ostrava | 30 | 7 | 9 | 14 | 31 | 46 | −15 | 30 | |
| 15 | Zbrojovka Brno (R) | 30 | 7 | 3 | 20 | 33 | 55 | −22 | 24 | Relegation to Czech 2. Liga |
| 16 | Ústí nad Labem (R) | 30 | 4 | 7 | 19 | 22 | 67 | −45 | 19 | Relegation to Czech 2. Liga |

Source: Fortuna liga
Rules for classification: 1) points; 2) head-to-head points; 3) head-to-head goal difference; 4) head-to-head goals scored; 5) goal difference; 6) number of goals scored.
(C) Champions; (R) Relegated

== Results ==
| Home \ Away | OST | B05 | ČBU | HRK | JAB | MLA | PŘI | SIG | SLA | SLO | LIB | SPA | TEP | ÚST | VPL | ZBR |
|---|---|---|---|---|---|---|---|---|---|---|---|---|---|---|---|---|
| Baník Ostrava | | 0–0 | 3–2 | 1–0 | 1–3 | 1–0 | 0–2 | 1–2 | 1–1 | 2–1 | 0–0 | 0–2 | 0–1 | 3–3 | 0–2 | 3–0 |
| Bohemians 1905 | 1–1 | | 2–2 | 1–0 | 0–1 | 3–1 | 1–0 | 2–1 | 1–1 | 1–0 | 3–1 | 0–1 | 1–1 | 1–0 | 1–0 | 2–1 |
| Dynamo České Budějovice | 2–1 | 1–1 | | 0–0 | 2–1 | 1–3 | 3–0 | 1–0 | 1–1 | 0–0 | 0–0 | 1–0 | 2–2 | 2–0 | 0–3 | 1–0 |
| Hradec Králové | 2–1 | 1–1 | 2–0 | | 1–0 | 0–0 | 2–1 | 1–0 | 0–0 | 0–0 | 1–0 | 2–1 | 0–0 | 3–3 | 0–3 | 1–0 |
| Jablonec | 3–3 | 3–1 | 5–0 | 7–0 | | 1–1 | 5–1 | 3–2 | 2–2 | 3–0 | 3–0 | 2–1 | 1–1 | 2–0 | 1–2 | 1–0 |
| Mladá Boleslav | 1–0 | 3–2 | 1–1 | 1–2 | 1–2 | | 3–0 | 2–0 | 3–1 | 2–3 | 3–1 | 1–2 | 3–3 | 2–0 | 4–3 | 5–0 |
| Příbram | 0–0 | 0–1 | 2–0 | 1–0 | 1–2 | 0–0 | | 0–0 | 1–1 | 0–1 | 1–0 | 0–1 | 1–1 | 0–0 | 0–3 | 1–0 |
| Sigma Olomouc | 2–0 | 3–1 | 5–1 | 2–0 | 4–1 | 0–0 | 3–1 | | 0–0 | 0–2 | 4–0 | 0–1 | 3–0 | 3–0 | 2–1 | 3–0 |
| Slavia Prague | 1–1 | 3–0 | 4–0 | 0–0 | 0–3 | 1–0 | 3–2 | 1–1 | | 2–0 | 1–3 | 1–2 | 4–1 | 3–0 | 0–1 | 1–1 |
| Slovácko | 0–0 | 1–3 | 2–0 | 2–1 | 1–1 | 1–2 | 2–0 | 0–2 | 3–0 | | 0–1 | 0–2 | 3–0 | 1–1 | 2–2 | 0–2 |
| Slovan Liberec | 4–1 | 1–0 | 3–3 | 3–0 | 1–1 | 4–0 | 0–0 | 3–0 | 0–2 | 1–0 | | 1–2 | 6–2 | 3–0 | 2–3 | 3–1 |
| Sparta Prague | 4–0 | 2–0 | 2–0 | 3–1 | 1–0 | 1–1 | 1–0 | 2–0 | 2–0 | 2–1 | 3–2 | | 0–2 | 4–1 | 0–1 | 2–0 |
| Teplice | 4–0 | 0–2 | 1–1 | 2–1 | 1–2 | 1–2 | 1–2 | 1–0 | 2–1 | 1–1 | 1–0 | 2–2 | | 2–1 | 0–1 | 1–2 |
| Ústí nad Labem | 0–4 | 1–0 | 1–1 | 0–2 | 2–1 | 0–2 | 0–3 | 0–3 | 1–1 | 2–0 | 0–0 | 1–3 | 0–2 | | 0–5 | 2–3 |
| Viktoria Plzeň | 3–1 | 2–1 | 2–1 | 2–1 | 1–1 | 3–1 | 2–1 | 2–2 | 2–2 | 3–0 | 1–1 | 1–0 | 4–2 | 7–0 | | 4–1 |
| Zbrojovka Brno | 0–2 | 1–0 | 1–1 | 1–2 | 3–4 | 3–1 | 0–1 | 2–0 | 2–3 | 7–0 | 0–1 | 0–5 | 0–1 | 1–3 | 1–1 | |

Source: Fortuna liga
Legend: Blue = home team win; Yellow = draw; Red = away team win.

== Top goalscorers ==
Final standings; Source: iDNES.cz

| Rank | Player | Club | Goals |
|---|---|---|---|
| 1 | (Czech Republic) David Lafata | FK Jablonec | 19 |
| 2 | (Czech Republic) Tomáš Pekhart | Sparta Prague | 18 |
| 3 | (Cameroon) Léonard Kweuke | Sparta Prague | 14 |
| 4 | (Czech Republic) Daniel Kolář | Viktoria Plzeň | 13 |
| 5 | (Czech Republic) Michal Hubník | Sigma Olomouc | 12 |
| 6 | (Czech Republic) Jan Rezek | Viktoria Plzeň | 11 |
| 7 | (Ivory Coast) Bony Wilfried | Sparta Prague | 10 |
| 7 | (Czech Republic) Jan Nezmar | Slovan Liberec | 10 |
| 7 | (Bosnia and Herzegovina) Ajdin Mahmutović | Teplice | 10 |
| 7 | (Czech Republic) Zdeněk Ondrášek | České Budějovice | 10 |

== European competitions ==
=== 2010–11 UEFA Champions League ===
Sparta Prague started in the second qualifying round of this season's Champions League. After defeating Latvian club FK Liepājas Metalurgs by a 5–0 aggregate scoreline, they qualified for the next round. Sparta defeated Polish club Lech Poznań in the third qualifying round, winning both matches by a score of 1–0. Losing 2–0 and 1–0 to Slovak club Žilina in the play-off round ended Sparta's involvement in the competition for this season.

=== 2010–11 Europa League ===
Baník Ostrava was the only Czech team involved in the second qualifying round of the Europa League. They got past Georgian club WIT Georgia with a goalless second leg result, having won the first match 6–0. In the third round, Viktoria Plzeň and Jablonec also entered the competition. However, all three Czech teams lost: Baník Ostrava 3–1 on aggregate to Belarusian club Dnepr Mogilev; Viktoria Plzeň and Jablonec 4–1 on aggregate, respectively to Turkish club Beşiktaş and Cypriot club APOEL.

Sparta Prague qualified for the group stage of the Europa League due to their performance in the Champions League. With results of two wins, three draws, and one loss, they finished second in Group F – behind CSKA Moscow (Russia) but ahead of Palermo (Italy) and Lausanne-Sport (Switzerland). As a result, they advanced to the knockout phase of the competition. English club Liverpool provided the opposition after a goalless first game in Prague. A single goal from striker Dirk Kuyt eliminated Sparta from the Europa League, 1–0 in the match and on aggregate.

== Attendances ==
| # | Club | Average |
|---|---|---|
| 1 | Sparta Praha | 8,665 |
| 2 | Viktoria Plzeň | 6,415 |
| 3 | Slavia Praha | 5,782 |
| 4 | Sigma Olomouc | 5,782 |
| 5 | Slovácko | 5,597 |
| 6 | Hradec Králové | 5,174 |
| 7 | Slovan Liberec | 4,521 |
| 8 | Baník Ostrava | 4,319 |
| 9 | Teplice | 4,129 |
| 10 | Jablonec | 3,634 |
| 11 | Mladá Boleslav | 3,543 |
| 12 | Bohemians | 3,456 |
| 13 | Příbram | 3,118 |
| 14 | České Budějovice | 2,964 |
| 15 | Zbrojovka Brno | 2,475 |
| 16 | Ústí nad Labem | 2,298 |

== See also ==
- 2010–11 Czech Cup
- 2010–11 Czech 2. Liga
