= 2015–16 Czech First League =

23rd season of top-tier football league in Czech Republic

Czech First League
- Season: 2015–16
- Champions: Viktoria Plzeň
- Relegated: Baník Ostrava; Sigma Olomouc
- Champions League: Viktoria Plzeň; Sparta Prague
- Europa League: Slovan Liberec; Mladá Boleslav; Slavia Prague
- Matches: 240
- Goals: 676 (2.82 per match)
- Top goalscorer: David Lafata (20 goals)
- Biggest home win: Sigma Olomouc 6–0 Teplice (14 May 2016)
- Biggest away win: 4 matches: Příbram 0–4 Viktoria Plzeň (13 September 2015); Brno 0–4 Teplice (3 October 2015); Příbram 0–4 Sparta Prague (18 October 2015); Baník Ostrava 0–4 Viktoria Plzeň (8 November 2015)
- Highest scoring: Olomouc 6–2 Baník Ostrava (1 April 2016)
- Longest winning run: Viktoria Plzeň (16)
- Longest unbeaten run: Viktoria Plzeň (16)
- Longest winless run: Baník Ostrava; Bohemians 1905 (8)
- Longest losing run: Baník Ostrava (8)
- Highest attendance: 18,864; Sparta 3–1 Slavia (20 March 2016)
- All statistics correct as of 1 May 2016.

The 2015–16 Czech First League, known as the Synot liga for sponsorship reasons, was the 23rd season of the Czech Republic's top-tier football league. Defending champions Viktoria Plzeň won the league for a second consecutive season, winning their fourth Czech title as a result.

== Teams ==
Sigma Olomouc, the 2014–15 FNL champion, returned to the First League just one season after their relegation. Runner-up FK Varnsdorf were not promoted as their stadium failed to meet the league requirements. Instead, FC Fastav Zlín rejoined the top level for the first time since the 2008–09 season.

=== Stadia and locations ===
Location of teams in 2015–16 Czech First League

Club	Location	Stadium	Capacity	2014–15
Baník Ostrava	Ostrava	Městský stadion	15,163	13th
Bohemians 1905	Prague	Ďolíček	5,000	8th
Dukla Prague	Prague	Stadion Juliska	8,150	6th
FK Jablonec	Jablonec nad Nisou	Stadion Střelnice	6,280	3rd
FK Mladá Boleslav	Mladá Boleslav	Městský stadion (Mladá Boleslav)	5,000	4th
1. FK Příbram	Příbram	Na Litavce	9,100	5th
Sigma Olomouc	Olomouc	Andruv Stadion	12,500	FNL, 1st (Promoted)
Slavia Prague	Prague	Eden Arena	20,800	9th
1. FC Slovácko	Uherské Hradiště	Městský fotbalový stadion Miroslava Valenty	8,121	11th
Slovan Liberec	Liberec	Stadion u Nisy	9,900	12th
Sparta Prague	Prague	Generali Arena	19,416	2nd
FK Teplice	Teplice	Na Stínadlech	18,221	7th
Viktoria Plzeň	Plzeň	Stadion města Plzně	11,722	1st
Vysočina Jihlava	Jihlava	Stadion v Jiráskově ulici	4,075	10th
Zbrojovka Brno	Brno	Městský stadion (Brno)	12,550	14th
FC Fastav Zlín	Zlín	Letná Stadion	6,375	FNL, 3rd (Promoted)

=== Personnel and kits ===
Club	Manager	Captain	Kit manufacturer	Sponsors
Baník	(Czech Republic) Radomír Korytář	(Czech Republic)	Joma	Vítkovice; OZO
Bohemians	(Slovakia) Roman Pivarník	(Czech Republic)	adidas	Remal
Dukla	(Czech Republic) Luboš Kozel	(Czech Republic) Marek Hanousek	adidas	Carbounion
Jablonec	(Slovakia) Zdenko Frťala	(Czech Republic)	Nike	TipGames; ČPP
Mladá Bloleslav	(Czech Republic) Karel Jarolím	(Czech Republic)	adidas	Škoda
Příbram	(Czech Republic) Pavel Tobiáš	(Czech Republic)	adidas	Energon Dobříš; TipGames
Sigma	(Czech Republic) Václav Jílek	(Czech Republic)	adidas	Sigma Group
Slavia	(Czech Republic) Dušan Uhrin, Jr.	(Czech Republic)	Umbro	CEFC China
Slovácko	(Czech Republic) Svatopluk Habanec	(Czech Republic)	Nike	Z-Group; SynotTip
Slovan	(Czech Republic) Jindřich Trpišovský	(Czech Republic)	Nike	Preciosa
Sparta	(Czech Republic) Zdeněk Ščasný	(Czech Republic) David Lafata	Nike	SynotTip
Teplice	(Czech Republic) David Vavruška	(Czech Republic)	Umbro	AGC Glass; Speciální Stavby Most
Viktoria	(Czech Republic) Karel Krejčí	(Czech Republic)	Puma	Doosan
Vysočina	(Slovakia) Michal Hipp	(Czech Republic)	adidas	PSJ
Zbrojovka	(Czech Republic) Václav Kotal	(Czech Republic)	Nike	FlatStore
Zlín	(Czech Republic) Bohumil Páník	(Czech Republic)	Saller	Lukrom

== League table ==
Pos	Team	Pld	W	D	L	GF	GA	GD	Pts	Qualification or relegation
1	Viktoria Plzeň (C)	30	23	2	5	57	25	+32	71	Qualification for the Champions League third qualifying round
2	Sparta Prague	30	20	4	6	61	24	+37	64	Qualification for the Champions League third qualifying round
3	Slovan Liberec	30	17	7	6	51	35	+16	58	Qualification for the Europa League third qualifying round (Note: Mladá Boleslav qualified for the Europa League third qualifying round by winning the 2015–16 Czech Cup.)
4	Mladá Boleslav	30	16	9	5	63	37	+26	57	Qualification for the Europa League third qualifying round
5	Slavia Prague	30	14	10	6	48	26	+22	52	Qualification for the Europa League second qualifying round
6	Zbrojovka Brno	30	14	5	11	37	38	−1	47	
7	Jablonec	30	10	11	9	46	39	+7	41	
8	Slovácko	30	12	4	14	37	51	−14	40	
9	Bohemians 1905	30	8	13	9	35	37	−2	37	
10	Dukla Prague	30	8	11	11	44	41	+3	35	
11	Vysočina Jihlava	30	8	7	15	31	54	−23	31	
12	Teplice	30	7	9	14	37	52	−15	30 (Note: Teplice ahead of Zlín on head-to-head record; Zlín–Teplice 1–2, Teplice–Zlín 2–2.)	
13	Zlín	30	7	9	14	34	50	−16	30	
14	Příbram	30	7	6	17	33	53	−20	27 (Note: Příbram ahead of Sigma Olomouc on head-to-head record; Příbram–Sigma Olomouc 3–0, Sigma Olomouc–Příbram 1–3.)	
15	Sigma Olomouc (R)	30	6	9	15	35	49	−14	27	Relegation to FNL
16	Baník Ostrava (R)	30	4	2	24	27	65	−38	14	Relegation to FNL

Source: Fortuna liga, Soccerway
Rules for classification: 1) Points; 2) Head-to-head points; 3) Head-to-head goal difference; 4) Head-to-head goals scored; 5) Goal difference; 6) Goals scored; 7) Play-off (only if deciding champion, UEFA competitions, or relegation); 8) Draw.
(C) Champions; (R) Relegated

== Results ==
Home \ Away	OST	B05	DUK	ZLN	JAB	MLA	PŘI	SIG	SLA	SLO	LIB	SPA	TEP	VPL	JIH	ZBR
Baník Ostrava		1–2	1–2	3–0	1–2	2–2	0–2	1–0	1–3	2–1	0–2	0–1	1–2	0–4	1–2	1–2
Bohemians 1905	3–1		1–0	0–1	2–1	2–0	1–1	1–1	0–0	2–0	0–1	2–2	1–1	0–1	2–1	1–1
Dukla Prague	4–1	2–2		1–0	6–1	1–1	0–1	2–0	0–1	0–1	2–0	1–2	4–0	1–0	0–1	1–2
Zlín	2–0	1–1	2–2		2–2	0–2	0–0	0–0	0–2	2–1	2–0	1–2	1–2	1–2	1–0	2–1
Jablonec	1–1	2–2	3–3	3–1		1–2	0–0	4–0	0–0	3–1	1–1	1–1	1–0	0–1	2–0	3–0
Mladá Boleslav	3–0	1–1	2–2	5–2	1–0		4–0	4–1	2–1	4–1	2–2	2–4	4–3	2–0	6–1	2–0
Příbram	1–2	0–0	2–2	1–2	2–3	2–3		3–0	1–3	0–1	0–1	0–4	3–2	0–4	4–1	1–1
Sigma Olomouc	6–2	2–2	0–0	1–1	2–1	1–2	1–3		1–1	2–0	1–1	0–2	6–0	0–1	2–1	1–1
Slavia Prague	3–1	2–2	1–1	1–0	0–0	1–1	2–1	0–2		5–1	2–2	1–0	2–2	5–0	4–0	2–0
Slovácko	2–1	1–0	4–3	1–1	1–1	0–2	2–1	2–1	0–2		1–2	2–0	4–2	1–2	3–1	2–1
Slovan Liberec	2–1	3–1	1–1	4–3	3–2	4–2	3–0	2–1	2–1	0–0		1–0	2–0	0–1	2–0	4–2
Sparta Prague	3–1	3–0	2–0	3–0	2–1	2–0	2–1	4–0	3–1	4–0	3–0		3–1	0–3	5–0	2–1
Teplice	1–0	2–1	1–1	2–2	2–2	0–0	2–0	2–2	0–1	2–0	0–3	1–1		2–2	0–1	0–1
Viktoria Plzeň	2–0	2–0	3–0	4–2	1–2	1–0	4–0	2–0	2–1	2–2	2–1	2–1	1–0		2–0	2–1
Vysočina Jihlava	3–0	1–2	2–2	2–2	1–0	1–1	1–3	2–1	0–0	1–2	1–1	0–0	2–1	2–4		2–0
Zbrojovka Brno	2–1	2–1	3–0	2–0	0–3	1–1	2–0	2–0	1–0	2–0	3–1	1–0	0–4	1–0	1–1	

Source: Fortuna liga
Legend: Blue = home team win; Yellow = draw; Red = away team win.

== Top scorers ==
Rank	Player	Club	Goals
1	(Czech Republic) David Lafata	Sparta Prague	20
2	(Slovakia) Michal Ďuriš	Viktoria Plzeň	16
3	(Czech Republic) Lukáš Magera	Mladá Boleslav	14
3	(Czech Republic) Milan Škoda	Slavia Prague	14
5	(Czech Republic) Jakub Řezníček	Zbrojovka Brno	13
6	(Slovakia) Marek Bakoš	Slovan Liberec	12
6	(Bosnia and Herzegovina) Muris Mešanovič	Slavia Prague	12
8	(Czech Republic) Tomáš Berger	Dukla Prague	10

== Attendances ==
Pos	Team	Total	High	Low	Average	Change
1	Viktoria Plzeň	32,564	11,233	10,126	10,620	−2.3%
2	Sparta Prague	146,382	18,684	5,731	9,759	+4.4%
3	Slavia Prague	18,017	6,739	5,127	8,884	+35.7%
4	Slovan Liberec	17,791	7,100	5,309	4,868	+2.9%
5	Zbrojovka Brno	15,138	5,326	4,722	4,798	+11.5%
6	Slovácko	14,041	5,884	3,726	4,696	+4.6%
7	Sigma Olomouc	14,050	5,062	4,162	4,656	n/a^{1}
8	Bohemians 1905	12,744	4,818	3,728	4,628	+4.1%
9	Teplice	22,679	9,361	3,715	4,589	−3.6%
10	Baník Ostrava	10,639	6,091	4,548	4,576	+3.7%
11	Zlín	15,068	5,873	4,568	4,313	n/a^{1}
12	Mladá Boleslav	11,395	5,000	3,154	3,306	+6.9%
13	Vysočina Jihlava	10,457	3,894	2,874	3,154	−1.7%
14	Příbram	12,994	6,787	2,018	2,977	−2.5%
15	Jablonec	15,812	6,012	4,188	2,827	−24.9%
16	Dukla Prague	12,296	5,182	2,046	2,642	+5.0%
	League total	1,219,404	11,233	2,018	5,081	+7.5%

Updated to games played on 14 September 2015
Source: synotliga.cz
Notes:
1: Team played last season in FNL

== See also ==
- 2015–16 Czech Cup
- 2015–16 Czech National Football League
