= David Lafata =

Czech footballer

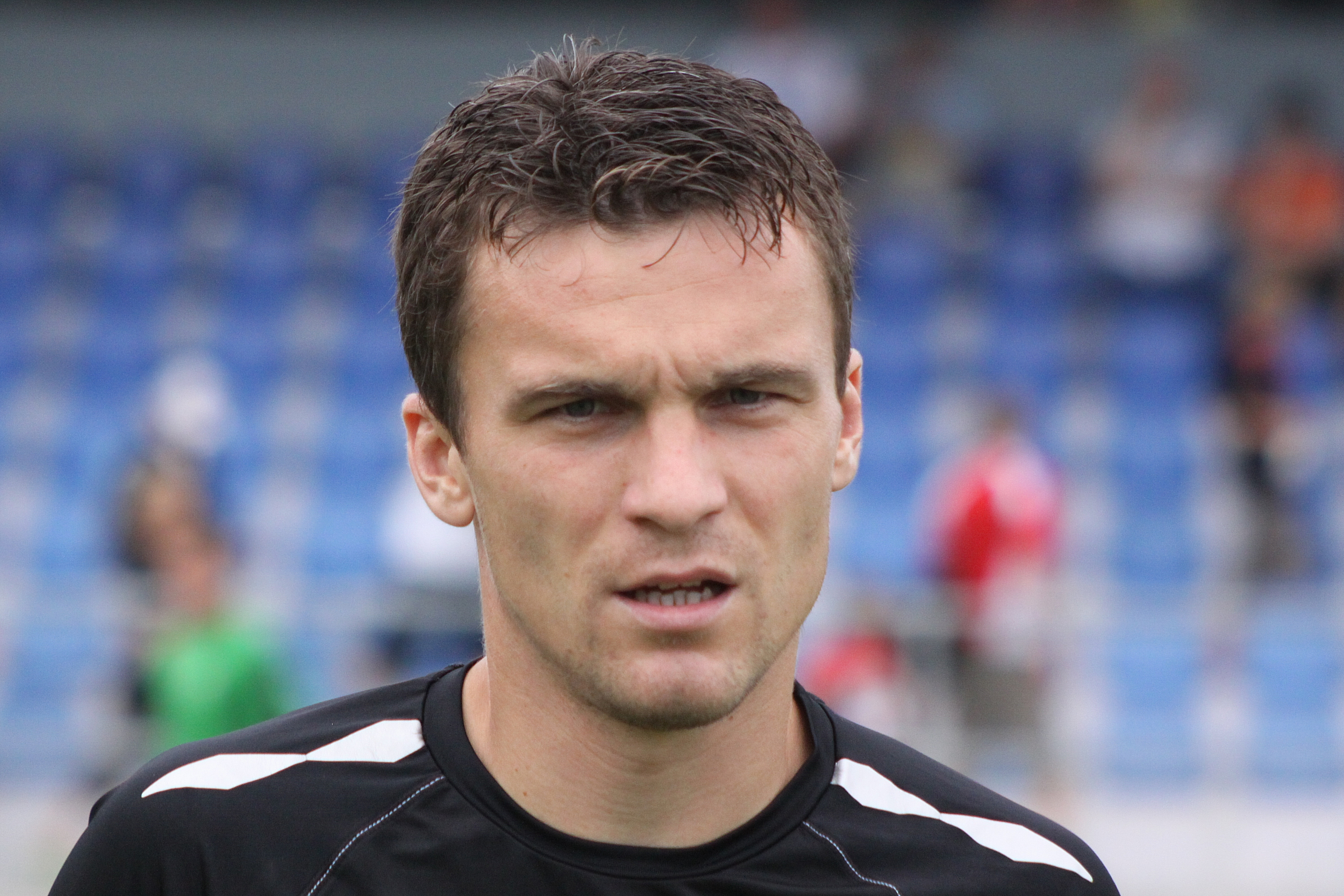
- Lafata in 2009

Personal information
- Date of birth: 18 September 1981 (age 45)
- Place of birth: České Budějovice, Czechoslovakia
- Height: 1.80 m (5 ft 11 in)
- Position: Forward

Youth career
- 1989–1992: JZD Olešník
- 1992–1999: České Budějovice

Senior career*
Years	Team	Apps	(Gls)
1999–2005	České Budějovice	109	(27)
2002	→ Jihlava (loan)	5	(1)
2005–2006	Skoda Xanthi	9	(0)
2006–2007	Jablonec	31	(10)
2007–2008	Austria Wien	36	(6)
2008–2012	Jablonec	130	(78)
2013–2018	Sparta Prague	148	(83)
Total		468	(205)

International career
1996–1997	Czech Republic U15	9	(0)
1997	Czech Republic U16	3	(0)
1998–1999	Czech Republic U17	8	(2)
1999–2000	Czech Republic U18	13	(6)
2001–2002	Czech Republic U20	6	(0)
2002–2003	Czech Republic U21	13	(3)
2006–2016	Czech Republic	41	(9)
- * Club domestic league appearances and goals

David Lafata (born 18 September 1981) is a Czech former professional footballer who played as a forward. He was the Czech First League's top scorer in six seasons and with 198 league goals, he is by far the top scorer of the Czech First League of all time. He also scored nine goals for the Czech Republic national team.

== Club career ==
From 1992 until 2005, Lafata played for Czech team SK České Budějovice, with a brief spell at FC Vysočina Jihlava in 2002. The striker then moved to Greek club Skoda Xanthi in July 2005, but returned to the Czech Liga in January 2006. After one year at Jablonec, Lafata was transferred to FK Austria Vienna in January 2007 from where he came back to Jablonec in the spring of 2008. For Austria, he scored a goal in a domestic cup final.

In the 2010–11 season, Lafata was top scorer of the Czech First League with 19 goals.

He continued his good run of form into the 2011–12 season, scoring eleven goals in the first seven games, at the end of the autumn half, he scored eighteen goals in sixteen appearances. In April 2012, Lafata broke the Czech First League season scoring record, notching his 23rd goal of the season. He finished season with 25 goals, being top scorer and setting a new record.

In the 2012–13 season, Lafata scored 13 goals in the first 16 games, being top scorer of the league before signing for AC Sparta Prague in the winter break. In February 2013, he scored a goal in the Europa League round of 32, in a 2–1 aggregate loss to Chelsea at Stamford Bridge. In March 2014 Lafata scored his 134th goal in the Czech First League, surpassing Horst Siegl as its top all-time scorer.

At the start of the 2014–15 season, Lafata scored five goals in a 7–0 Champions League qualifying round win over Levadia Tallinn in the home leg in Prague. Continuing his fine form in the Champions League qualifying round, Lafata scored a hat-trick in a 4–2 comeback victory over Malmö FF at home in Prague. In autumn 2015, Lafata was denied at hat-trick (by the Croatian referee) in Europa League match in Greece against Asteras Tripolis. He scored goal in both away and home match against Schalke 04, as Sparta progressed to the knockout stages.

In May 2016, Lafata became the first player to score five goals in a Czech First League match, netting all of the goals in a 5–0 win against Jihlava. On 30 July 2017, he scored his 200th league goal in a 1–1 draw against city rival Bohemians 1905.

== International career ==
He scored two goals on his debut for the Czech national team in a 2–1 win against Wales on 2 September 2006. He came on as a substitute after 75 mins and scored within a minute of coming on, the second coming in the 89th minute.

== Career statistics ==
=== Club ===
Source: League matches European club matches League matches for Austria

Appearances and goals by club, season and competition
Club	Season	League			Cup		Europe		Total	
Club	Season	Division	Apps	Goals	Apps	Goals	Apps	Goals	Apps	Goals
SK České Budějovice	2000–01	Czech First League	11	0			–		11	0
SK České Budějovice	2001–02	Czech 2. Liga					–			
SK České Budějovice	2002–03	Czech First League	26	8			–		26	8
SK České Budějovice	2003–04	Czech First League	29	14			–		29	14
SK České Budějovice	2004–05	Czech First League	25	5			–		25	5
SK České Budějovice	Total		91	27			–		91	27
Skoda Xanthi	2005–06	Super League Greece	9	0	2	1	–		11	1
FK Jablonec	2005–06	Czech First League	14	3			–		14	3
FK Jablonec	2006–07	Czech First League	17	7			–		17	7
FK Jablonec	Total		31	10			–		31	10
Austria Wien	2006–07	Austrian Bundesliga	13	1	–		0	0	13	1
Austria Wien	2007–08	Austrian Bundesliga	22	5	3	1	7 (Note: Appearances in UEFA Europa League)	0	32	6
Austria Wien	Total		35	6	3	1	7	0	45	7
FK Jablonec	2008–09	Czech First League	30	10			–		30	10
FK Jablonec	2009–10	Czech First League	27	11	5	3	–		32	14
FK Jablonec	2010–11	Czech First League	29	19	4	3	2	0	35	22
FK Jablonec	2011–12	Czech First League	28	25	6	3	4	3	38	31
FK Jablonec	2012–13	Czech First League	16	13	1	2	–		17	15
FK Jablonec	Total		130	78	16	11	6	3	152	92
Sparta Prague	2012–13	Czech First League	12	7	2	0	2	1	16	8
Sparta Prague	2013–14	Czech First League	30	16	6	2	2	2	38	20
Sparta Prague	2014–15	Czech First League	30	20	3 (Note: Two appearances in Czech Cup, one appearance and one goal in Czech Supercup)	1	11 (Note: Four appearances and eight goals in UEFA Champions League, seven appearances and five goals in UEFA Europa League)	13	44	34
Sparta Prague	2015–16	Czech First League	26	20	3	2	12 (Note: One appearance in UEFA Champions League, eleven appearances and five goals in UEFA Europa League)	5	41	27
Sparta Prague	2016–17	Czech First League	28	15	2	0	10 (Note: Two appearances in UEFA Champions League, eight appearances and two goals in UEFA Europa League)	2	40	17
Sparta Prague	2017–18	Czech First League	22	5	1	0	2	0	25	5
Sparta Prague	Total		148	83	17	5	39	23	204	111
Career total			444	204	38	18	52	26	534	248

=== International goals ===
Scores and results list Czech Republic's goal tally first, score column indicates score after each Lafata goal.

List of international goals scored by David Lafata
No.	Date	Venue	Cap	Opponent	Score	Result	Competition
1	2 September 2006	Na Stínadlech, Teplice, Czech Republic	1	Wales	1–0	2–1	UEFA Euro 2008 qualifying
2	2 September 2006	Na Stínadlech, Teplice, Czech Republic	1	Wales	2–1	2–1	UEFA Euro 2008 qualifying
3	26 May 2012	UPC-Arena, Graz, Austria	17	Israel	2–1	2–1	Friendly
4	14 November 2012	Andrův stadion, Olomouc, Czech Republic	24	Slovakia	1–0	3–0	Friendly
5	14 November 2012	Andrův stadion, Olomouc, Czech Republic	24	Slovakia	2–0	3–0	Friendly
6	6 February 2013	Manisa 19 Mayıs Stadium, Manisa, Turkey	25	Turkey	2–0	2–0	Friendly
7	11 October 2013	Ta' Qali National Stadium, Mdina, Malta	28	Malta	2–0	4–1	2014 FIFA World Cup qualification
8	13 October 2014	Astana Arena, Astana, Kazakhstan	33	Kazakhstan	2–0	4–2	UEFA Euro 2016 qualifying
9	27 May 2016	Kufstein Arena, Kufstein, Austria	38	Malta	4–0	6–0	Friendly

== Honours ==
Austria Wien

- Austrian Cup: 2006–07

Sparta Prague

- Czech First League: 2013–14
- Czech Cup: 2013–14
- Czech Supercup: 2014

Individual

- Czech Footballer of the Year: 2014
- Czech First League top scorer: 2010–11, 2011–12, 2012–13, 2014–15, 2015–16, 2016–17

Records

- Czech First League all-time top goalscorer
- Czech First League most goals in the row: 9 matches / 9 goals
- Most goals in a single Czech First League game: 5 goals
- FK Jablonec all-time top goalscorer in Czech First League: 88 goals
- SK Dynamo České Budějovice all-time third goalscorer in Czech First League: 27 goals
- Most goals in a single UEFA Champions League qualifying phase: 8 goals (2014–15) (shared with Cléo)
- Most goals in a single UEFA Champions League game: 5 goals (shared with Lionel Messi, Luiz Adriano and Mikhail Mikholap)
