= FK Příbram =

Czech professional football club

Coordinates: 49°40′37″N 13°58′35″E

- Full name: Fotbal Příbram a.s.
- Founded: 1928; 98 years ago
- Ground: Na Litavce, Příbram
- Capacity: 9,100
- Chairman: Jan Starka
- Manager: Jiří Kohout
- League: Czech National Football League
- 2025–26: 6th of 16
- Website: www.fkpribram.cz
Home colours	Away colours

FK Příbram is a Czech professional football club based in Příbram. After the 2024–25 season, the club replaced MFK Vyškov in the Czech National Football League. FK Příbram is the legal successor to Dukla Prague, a club which won 11 national league titles between 1953 and 1982.

== History ==
Club crest used until 2022

The team originated from two clubs, the 1966–67 European Cup semi-finalist Dukla Prague, which tradition it carries, and FC Příbram, merged in 1996. Příbram had previously spent two seasons in the second division, having been promoted from the third-tier Bohemian Football League at the end of the 1993–94 season. Dukla Prague, on the other hand, had spent the previous two seasons in the Bohemian Football League after being relegated from the inaugural season of the Czech First League in 1993–94.

The club competed in the 1996–97 Czech 2. Liga, playing home matches at Stadion Juliska in Prague. The club won the league that season and won promotion to the Czech First League. In 1997 the club moved to Příbram, playing its matches at Na Litavce stadium. The club played in the top division, changing its name to FK Marila Příbram in 2000. The club spent ten consecutive seasons in the top flight until being relegated in the 2006–07 season. The club played in the 2007–08 Czech 2. Liga, reaching third place at the time of the mid-season break under manager František Barát. At the end of the season, the club celebrated promotion back to the Czech First League after just one season away. The club changed its name to 1.FK Příbram in 2008. Příbram played in European competition in the 2000 UEFA Intertoto Cup, reaching the third round of the tournament. After finishing fourth in the 2000–01 Czech First League, Příbram again played in Europe, overcoming French side Sedan in the 2001–02 UEFA Cup before losing to Greek side PAOK in the second round of the competition. With new sponsor the club changed its name to FK Viagem Příbram in July 2022. After only one season main sponsor left and the club changed its name to FK Příbram.

== Historical names ==
- 1996–1998: FC Dukla
- 1998–2000: FC Dukla Příbram
- 2000–2008: FK Marila Příbram
- 2008–2022: 1. FK Příbram
- 2022–2023: FK Viagem Příbram
- 2023–present: FK Příbram

== Players ==
=== Current squad ===
As of 17 September 2026.

Note: Flags indicate national team as defined under FIFA eligibility rules; some limited exceptions apply. Players may hold more than one non-FIFA nationality.

No.	Pos.	Nation	Player
1	GK	CZE	Ondřej Bleha
3	DF	CZE	Milan Piško
5	DF	CZE	Filip Zápotočný
6	MF	CZE	Sebastian Kop
7	MF	CZE	Dominik Vott
8	DF	CZE	Tomáš Svoboda
9	FW	CIV	Zekinho Apea
10	FW	GUI	Defo Conte
11	MF	CZE	Jakub Tošnar
14	FW	UKR	Danyil Dolechek
15	MF	CZE	Adam Čadek
16	MF	CZE	Patrik Švestka
17	MF	CZE	Michal Vrána

No.	Pos.	Nation	Player
18	DF	SEN	Roger Faye
19	MF	CZE	Nicolas Penner (on loan from Mladá Boleslav)
20	MF	CZE	Daniel Roušar
21	GK	CZE	Martin Melichar
22	GK	CZE	Michal Gergela
23	FW	CZE	Tomáš Jedlička (on loan from Dukla Prague)
27	DF	CZE	Jakub Urbanec
29	MF	CZE	Adam Pešek
45	DF	SEN	Paul Nghabo
68	MF	CZE	Jaroslav Málek
77	MF	CZE	Lukáš Fila (on loan from Mladá Boleslav)
99	FW	CZE	Matouš Krulich (on loan from Mladá Boleslav)
—	DF	BFA	Cheick Traoré

=== Out on loan ===
Note: Flags indicate national team as defined under FIFA eligibility rules; some limited exceptions apply. Players may hold more than one non-FIFA nationality.

No.	Pos.	Nation	Player

=== Notable former players ===
Had senior international cap(s) for their respective countries. Players whose name is listed in bold represented their countries while playing for Příbram.

- (Czech Republic) Martin Hašek
- (Slovakia) Róbert Jež
- (Czech Republic) Marek Kulič
- (Kuwait) **Abdulaziz Al Masha'an**
- (Lithuania) **Marius Papšys**
- (Czech Republic) Horst Siegl
- (Czech Republic) Luděk Stracený
- (Togo) **Claude Videgla**
- (Czech Republic) Tomáš Zápotočný
- (Turkmenistan) Ruslan Mingazow

== Reserves ==
As of 2025–26, Příbram's reserve team FK Příbram B plays in the Bohemian Football League (3rd tier of Czech football system).

== Player records in the Czech First League ==
As of 29 May 2023 (after the last club's season in the Czech First League).

=== Most appearances ===
#	Name	Matches
1	(Czech Republic) Tomáš Pilík	263
2	(Czech Republic) Marcel Mácha	234
3	(Czech Republic) Rudolf Otepka	232
4	(Czech Republic) Aleš Hruška	190
5	(Czech Republic) Lukáš Pleško	155
6	(Czech Republic) Daniel Tarczal	149
7	(Czech Republic) Jaroslav Tregler	145
8	(Czech Republic) Daniel Huňa	133
9	(Czech Republic) Lukáš Jarolím	132
10	(Czech Republic) Jiří Rychlík	131

=== Most goals ===
#	Name	Goals
1	(Czech Republic) Rudolf Otepka	47
2	(Czech Republic) Tomáš Pilík	27
3	(Czech Republic) Horst Siegl	26
4	(Czech Republic) Marek Kulič	22
4	(Czech Republic) Daniel Huňa	22
6	(Czech Republic) Tomáš Wágner	21
7	(Czech Republic) Jakub Řezníček	16
8	(Czech Republic) Lukáš Jarolím	15
8	(Czech Republic) Michal Seman	15
8	(Czech Republic) Zdeněk Koukal	15
8	(Czech Republic) Jan Rezek	15

=== Most clean sheets ===
#	Name	Clean sheets
1	(Czech Republic) Aleš Hruška	45
2	(Czech Republic) Radek Sňozík	20
3	(Czech Republic) Oldřich Pařízek	19

== Managers ==
- Karel Jarolím (1997–98)
- Josef Csaplár (1998, 2000–01)
- Jozef Chovanec (Aug 2002 – Nov 2003)
- František Kopač (Nov 2003 – Nov 2004)
- Pavel Tobiáš (Dec 2004 – Sep 2006)
- František Barát (Sep 2006 – Jan 2007)
- Jiří Kotrba (Jan 2007 – Jun 2007)
- František Barát (2007 – Apr 2008)
- Massimo Morales (Apr 2008 – May 2009)
- Petr Čuhel (May 2009 – Jun 2009)
- Karol Marko (Jun 2009 – June 2010)
- Martin Hřídel (Jun 2010 – Sep 2010)
- Roman Nádvorník (Oct 2010 – Apr 2011)
- František Kopač (Apr 2011 – May 2011)
- David Vavruška (Jul 2011 – Aug 2012)
- Karol Marko (Aug 2012 – Mar 2013)
- František Straka (Mar 2013 – Oct 2013)
- Petr Čuhel (Oct 2013 – Sep 2014)
- Pavel Tobiáš (2014–16)
- Martin Pulpit (2016)
- Petr Rada (Aug 2016 – Jan 2017)
- Kamil Tobiáš (Jan 2017 – Jun 2017)
- Josef Csaplár (Jun 2017 – Mar 2019)
- Roman Nádvorník (Mar 2019 – Feb 2020)
- Pavel Horváth (Mar 2020 – Mar 2021)
- Jozef Valachovič (Mar 2021 – Nov 2021)
- Tomáš Zápotočný (Nov 2021 – Nov 2022)
- Dušan Uhrin Jr. (Nov 2022 – Apr 2023)
- Karel Krejčí (Apr 2023 – Apr 2024)
- Roman Bednář (Apr 2024 – May 2024)
- Jiří Kohout (May 2024 – present)

== History in domestic competitions ==
- 1993–1994: Bohemian Football League
- 1994–1997: Czech 2. Liga
- 1997–2007: Czech First League
- 2007–2008: Czech 2. Liga
- 2008–2017: Czech First League
- 2017–2018: Czech National Football League
- 2018–2021: Czech First League
- 2021–2024: Czech National Football League
- 2024–≥present: Bohemian Football League

- Seasons spent at Level 1 of the football league system: 22
- Seasons spent at Level 2 of the football league system: 8
- Seasons spent at Level 3 of the football league system: 1
- Seasons spent at Level 4 of the football league system: 0

=== Czech Republic ===
Season	League	Placed	Pld	W	D	L	GF	GA	GD	Pts	Cup
1993–94	3. liga	2nd	34	24	5	5	79	26	–8	53	Round of 32
1994–95	2. liga	5th	34	13	11	10	45	39	+6	50	Semi-finals
1995–96	2. liga	6th	30	12	7	11	42	32	+10	43	Quarter-finals
1996–97	2. liga	1st	30	22	5	3	53	15	+38	71	Runners-up
1997–98	1. liga	13th	30	9	6	15	37	50	–13	33	Quarter-finals
1998–99	1. liga	13th	30	8	9	13	28	41	–13	33	Round of 32
1999–00	1. liga	6th	30	11	7	12	33	36	–3	40	Round of 32
2000–01	1. liga	4th	30	14	9	7	40	26	+14	51	Round of 16
2001–02	1. liga	13th	30	9	7	14	27	39	–12	34	Quarter-finals
2002–03	1. liga	10th	30	9	12	9	34	30	+4	39	Quarter-finals
2003–04	1. liga	11th	30	10	7	13	33	37	–4	37	Quarter-finals
2004–05	1. liga	9th	30	9	8	13	30	41	–11	35	Round of 32
2005–06	1. liga	13th	30	8	10	12	36	36	0	34	Round of 16
2006–07	1. liga	15th	30	3	12	15	15	37	–22	21	Quarter-finals
2007–08	2. liga	2nd	30	14	10	6	33	18	+15	52	Round of 32
2008–09	1. liga	12th	30	9	7	14	30	40	–10	34	Round of 64
2009–10	1. liga	10th	30	10	6	14	35	41	–6	36	Quarter-finals
2010–11	1. liga	13th	30	8	7	15	22	36	–14	31	Round of 64
2011–12	1. liga	9th	30	11	6	13	44	56	–12	39	Round of 64
2012–13	1. liga	11th	30	7	11	12	27	39	–12	32	Round of 64
2013–14	1. liga	12th	30	9	7	14	34	49	–15	34	Round of 16
2014–15	1. liga	5th	30	12	7	11	40	45	–5	43	Round of 16
2015–16	1. liga	14th	30	7	6	17	33	53	–20	27	Round of 16
2016–17	1. liga	16th	30	6	4	20	29	61	–32	22	Round of 64
2017–18	2. liga	2nd	30	18	4	8	56	32	+24	58	Round of 32
2018–19	1. liga	14th	35	11	7	17	43	73	−40	40	Round of 16
2019–20	1. liga	16th	33	6	7	20	21	55	–34	25	Round of 64
2020–21	1. liga	17th	34	5	10	19	26	65	–39	25	Round of 32
2021–22	2. liga	13th	30	9	8	13	38	51	–13	35	Round of 32
2022–23	2. liga	3rd	30	14	9	7	48	32	+16	51	Round of 32
2023–24	2. liga	15th	30	11	4	15	32	43	–11	35 (Note: After season, two points were deducted.)	Round of 64
2024–25	3. liga	2nd	30	17	6	7	58	35	+23	57	Round of 64
2025–26	2. liga (Note: They purchased the license to play in the league from MFK Vyškov.)	6th	30	13	7	10	29	30	–1	46	First round

== Club records ==
=== Czech First League records ===
- Best position: 4th (2000–01)
- Worst position: 17th (2020–21)
- Biggest home win: Příbram 5–0 Hradec Králové (2002–03), Příbram 5–0 Jihlava (2013–14)
- Biggest away win: Plzeň 0–4 Příbram (2003–04)
- Biggest home defeat: Příbram 1–8 Slavia Prague (2016–17)
- Biggest away defeat: Jablonec 6–0 Příbram (2013–14)
