= Daniel Huňa =

Czech footballer

Personal information
- Date of birth: 25 June 1979 (age 47)
- Place of birth: Most, Czechoslovakia
- Height: 1.85 m (6 ft 1 in)
- Position: Striker

Youth career
- 1985–1995: Baník Most
- 1995–1999: 1. FC Plzeň

Senior career*
Years	Team	Apps	(Gls)
1999–2000	Baník Souš		
2000–2001	SAC Błyskawica		
2001	Centrum Sport Chicago		
2001–2003	Legovia Chicago		
2004	Bohemians 1905	26	(3)
2005–2012	Příbram	133	(22)
2011	→ Bohemians Prague (loan)	9	(1)
2012	→ Baník Most (loan)	13	(0)
- * Club domestic league appearances and goals

Daniel Huňa (born 25 June 1979) is a former professional Czech football player. He played over 100 games in the Czech First League for FK Příbram.

After six and a half years at Příbram, where he was captain, he joined FK Bohemians Praha (Střížkov) on loan in June 2011.
