= Petr Čuhel =

Czech footballer and manager (born 1965)

Personal information
- Date of birth: 4 January 1965 (age 61)
- Place of birth: Czechoslovakia
- Position: Defender

Senior career*
Years	Team	Apps	(Gls)
1989–1991	Brno	28	(1)

Managerial career
- 2009: Příbram
- 2011–2013: Brno
- 2013–2014: Příbram
- 2013–2014: Příbram
- 2020: Gaz Metan Mediaș (assistant)
- * Club domestic league appearances and goals

Petr Čuhel (born 4 January 1965) is a Czech football manager and former player who has managed Příbram and Brno.

He played for Brno in the Czechoslovak First League.

In May 2009, Čuhel took charge of Příbram for the final four games of the season after the dismissal of manager Massimo Morales. In November 2011, he was named the new manager of Brno, who were 14th in the Czech 2. Liga after the first half of the 2011–12 season. In the spring part of the season, Čuhel led Brno to a final position of fourth and promotion to the Gambrinus liga. After a run of 11 games in which Brno lost 9, Čuhel found himself out of the manager's position and replaced by Ludevít Grmela in April 2013. Later in 2013, he returned to Příbram, replacing František Straka. He remained there until September 2014, when he parted with the club.
