= František Straka =

Czech footballer and manager

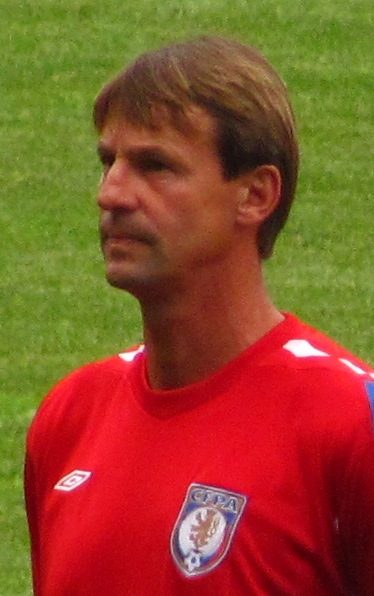
- Straka in 2011

Personal information
- Date of birth: 28 May 1958 (age 68)
- Place of birth: České Budějovice, Czechoslovakia
- Height: 1.82 m (6 ft 0 in)
- Position: Defender

Youth career
- 1966–1977: Dynamo České Budějovice

Senior career*
Years	Team	Apps	(Gls)
1977–1979	Dukla Tachov		
1979–1988	Sparta Prague	233	(10)
1988–1991	Borussia Mönchengladbach	81	(1)
1991–1992	Hansa Rostock	34	(0)
1992–1996	Wuppertaler SV	93	(7)
1996–1998	SCB Preußen Köln	35	(8)

International career
1983–1990	Czechoslovakia	35	(0)

Managerial career
- 1999–2001: Wuppertaler SV
- 2001–2002: Teplice (assistant)
- 2002–2004: Teplice
- 2004: Sparta Prague
- 2005: LR Ahlen
- 2006: Viktoria Plzeň
- 2006–2007: FC Wacker Tirol
- 2007–2008: České Budějovice
- 2008: OFI
- 2009: Czech Republic
- 2009–2010: Ružomberok
- 2010–2011: North Queensland Fury
- 2011: Arka Gdynia
- 2011–2012: Slavia Prague
- 2014: Slovan Bratislava
- 2016–2017: Ismaily SC
- 2017: Smouha SC
- 2018: Al-Ansar SC
- 2019: Karviná
- 2020–2021: Třinec
- 2023: AS Trenčín
- 2024: Michalovce
- 2024–2025: České Budějovice
- 2025: Dukla Banská Bystrica
- 2025: Košice
- * Club domestic league appearances and goals

František Straka (born 28 May 1958) is a Czech former football player and current manager.

== Playing career ==
Straka played most notably for Sparta Prague. In 1988, he moved to Germany and spent the rest of his playing career there. Straka played for Czechoslovakia and participated at the 1990 FIFA World Cup. He played total 35 matches for the national team from 1983 to 1990.

== Coaching career ==
=== Early coaching career ===
After retiring from playing, he began coaching. Straka led several top flight Czech clubs, including FK Teplice, Sparta Prague and Viktoria Plzeň. He also coached abroad in Austria, Slovakia and Greece. In 2009, he was selected as temporary manager of the Czech Republic national football team. On 30 June 2009, after only one game in charge he left the position. He won his only match, a 1–0 friendly victory against Malta on 5 June 2009.

In June 2010, Straka was appointed head coach of the North Queensland Fury in Townsville, Australia. He became a fan favourite in Australia due to his affable personality and fashion sense. Straka was ready to lead the North Queensland Fury for another season, but the club folded in 2011 because of financial difficulties.

After speculation that he was going to replace Ernie Merrick at Melbourne Victory, Straka returned to Europe, where he was announced manager of Polish Ekstraklasa club Arka Gdynia. In October 2011, he was announced as the replacement for Michal Petrouš as manager of SK Slavia Prague. His appointment as a new manager of Slavia sparked controversy and protests from Slavia fans, who saw Straka as a rival Sparta's patriot. Straka's appointment was also criticized by Sparta fans, who saw Straka as a traitor After just five months in the job, Straka resigned in March 2012. Straka returned to the Czech First League after a year's break in March 2013, joining bottom-table club 1. FK Příbram. He lasted only half a year in this job before being replaced by their former manager, Petr Čuhel.

In December 2016, Straka was appointed as manager of Egyptian club Ismaily SC signing a 1.5-year contract. It was the first time position in the Arab region or Africa of his career.

=== 2020s ===
On 20 February 2024, Straka was appointed as manager of Slovak football club Michalovce. The same year on 28 July, he was appointed as manager of Dynamo České Budějovice. On 10 January 2025, Straka was sacked by Dynamo České Budějovice following poor match results that resulted in the club being the bottom of 2024–25 Czech First League table. On 17 March 2025, he was appointed as coach of Dukla Banská Bystrica. On 8 October 2025, he was appointed as coach of Košice. On 11 November 2025, Straka was sacked after only six matches.

== Honours ==
=== Managerial ===
Teplice

- Czech Cup: 2002–03

Sparta Prague

- Czech Cup: 2003–04

Slovan Bratislava

- Slovak Super Cup: 2014
