= Karol Marko =

Slovak football manager (born 1966)

Personal information
- Date of birth: 2 April 1966 (age 60)
- Place of birth: Bratislava, Czechoslovakia
- Position: Defender

Senior career*
Years	Team	Apps	(Gls)
2001–2002	Rača		

Managerial career
- 2006: Trenčín
- 2007–2009: Jihlava
- 2009–2010: Příbram
- 2010: Banská Bystrica
- 2010–2011: Baník Ostrava
- 2012–2013: Příbram
- 2013–2015: Rača
- * Club domestic league appearances and goals

Karol Marko (born 2 April 1966) is a Slovak football manager and former player.

Marko worked as an assistant coach in several mostly Slovak clubs. His first job as a first coach was at FK AS Trenčín in 2006. In 2007, he moved to the Czech Republic to coach FC Vysočina Jihlava. Two years later he moved to 1. FK Příbram, where he worked for one season, after which he moved back to Slovakia to coach Dukla Banská Bystrica. In November 2010, after the 15th round of the Slovak League, Marko left Banská Bystrica to coach FC Baník Ostrava in the Czech Republic, where he replaced sacked coach Miroslav Koubek. He only oversaw one game of the 2011–12 Gambrinus liga season before becoming the season's first managerial casualty on 30 July 2011. In August 2012 he returned to the Gambrinus liga, taking over at Příbram.
