= Vít Valenta =

Czech footballer

Personal information
- Full name: Vít Valenta
- Date of birth: 4 January 1983 (age 43)
- Place of birth: Uherské Hradiště, Czechoslovakia
- Position: Midfielder

Youth career
- TJ Sokol Kněžpole
- SS Uherské Hradišté
- 1994–2001: Synot Staré Město

Senior career*
Years	Team	Apps	(Gls)
2001	Synot Staré Město		
2001	PSV Eindhoven	0	(0)
2002–2003	Lommel	27	(6)
2003–2005	HSC '21		
2005–2006	Cercle Brugge	17	(1)
2007–2009	FC Volendam	33	(1)
2009–2012	1. FC Slovácko	46	(0)
Total		123	(8)
- * Club domestic league appearances and goals as of 30 July 2011

Vít Valenta (born 4 January 1983 in Uherské Hradiště) is a former Czech professional football player. He played as a midfielder and was known for his long throws.

Valenta was noticed by PSV Eindhoven at the age of 17, while playing in the UEFA Intertoto Cup with Synot Staré Město. He was signed by Lommel soon afterwards, having become too expensive for PSV. The Czech Republic was not part of the European Union at that time, so PSV was ought to pay Valenta € 400.000 per year. But only one season later, Lommel went bankrupt.

Valenta did not immediately find a new team, so he signed an amateur contract with the Dutch Hoofdklasse side HSC '21. He was successful at that level, and signed a new professional contract one season later with Cercle Brugge in Belgium. Cercle considered him a successor to Harald Meyssen, but Valenta could not fulfil these expectations and was released by Cercle in January 2007 on a free transfer.

Valenta went back to Netherlands to join FC Volendam. After 4 months, he was granted a work permit, so Volendam was able to offer him a contract.

Valenta returned to the Czech Republic by signing a 3-year contract with 1. FC Slovácko, where he quickly became the team's captain. However, due to a dispute with Slovácko's manager Miroslav Soukup and the end of his contract, he decided to retire from professional football at the age of only 28. He joined the amateur team SV Großweikersdorf in the sixth tier of the Austrian league. He subsequently trained the youth team at SK Borsice.
