= FC Vysočina Jihlava =

Association football club in Czech Republic

- Full name: Football Club Vysočina Jihlava a.s.
- Founded: 1948; 78 years ago
- Stadium: Stadion v Jiráskově ulici
- Capacity: 4,500
- Chairman: Lukáš Vaculík
- Manager: Marek Nikl
- League: Czech National Football League
- 2025–26: 15th of 16
- Website: www.fcvysocina.cz
| Home colours | Away colours |

FC Vysočina Jihlava is a football club from Jihlava, Czech Republic, which plays in the Czech National Football League (second tier). The club played in the Czech First League for the first time in its history in the 2005–06 season, and also played in the league for six seasons between 2012 and 2018.

== History ==
Former logo

The club was founded under the name PAL Jihlava in 1948. After the Czech Republic became independent in 1993, the club played in the third-tier Bohemian Football League until promotion in 2000 to the Czech 2. Liga. The club went on to take part in the second division for five years, reaching the semi-finals of the Czech Cup in 2003–04 and winning promotion to the top flight after finishing second in the 2004–05 Czech 2. Liga. Jihlava played in the top flight for the first time in their history in 2005–06, being relegated back to the second league on the last day of the season, after a loss at home against Slavia Prague. Following another spell in the second league, this time of six years, the club won back a place in the top flight having finished second in the 2011–12 Czech 2. Liga. Returning to the First League in 2012, Jihlava spent six seasons in the top tier, peaking with a historic 8th-place finish. After bowing out in 2018 after a 2–0 loss against Karviná, the club instantly challenged for promotion in the 2018–19 play-offs again against Karviná. The fierce battle, however, became infamous for severe refereeing controversies that blocked Vysočina's path back to the top flight. Since then, Jihlava has remained in the second tier.

== Historical names ==
- 1948–49 – PAL Jihlava
- 1949–53 – Sokol Motorpal Jihlava
- 1953–93 – Spartak Jihlava
- 1993–95 – Spartak PSJ Jihlava
- 1995–97 – PSJ Motorpal Jihlava (merger with SK Jihlava)
- 1997–00 – FC PSJ Jihlava
- Since 2000 – FC Vysočina Jihlava

== Stadium ==
Jihlava play home matches at the Stadion v Jiráskově ulici, which boasts a 4,082 all-seater capacity. The club undertook major reconstruction each time the club was promoted to the Czech First League, in 2005 and 2012, in order for the stadium to meet league criteria. The stadium features two main stands for the crowd (sectors A and B), while the away fans are catered for with 229 seats behind one of the goals (sector D). The remaining side, sector C, is reserved for VIP guests.

== Players ==
=== Current squad ===
As of 14 September 2026.

Note: Flags indicate national team as defined under FIFA eligibility rules; some limited exceptions apply. Players may hold more than one non-FIFA nationality.

| No. | Pos. | Nation | Player |
|---|---|---|---|
| 6 | DF | CZE | David Štětka |
| 8 | MF | CZE | David Jambor |
| 9 | FW | BEL | Tyrese Omotoye |
| 10 | MF | CZE | Lukáš Moudrý (on loan from Sparta Prague) |
| 11 | FW | CZE | Radek Křivánek |
| 14 | DF | CZE | Aleš Kočí |
| 15 | DF | NGR | Muhammad Abdullahi |
| 17 | MF | NGR | Khalid Labaran |
| 18 | DF | SLO | Vito Štrakl |
| 19 | DF | CZE | Jan Haala |
| 20 | MF | CZE | Jakub Lopatář |
| 21 | DF | CZE | Michal Hošek |
| 22 | MF | SVK | Matúš Lacko |

| No. | Pos. | Nation | Player |
|---|---|---|---|
| 24 | MF | CZE | Miroslav Křehlík |
| 25 | DF | CZE | David Matoušek |
| 27 | MF | SVK | Adrián Čermák |
| 31 | GK | CZE | Filip Slavata |
| 32 | GK | CZE | Pavel Soukup |
| 33 | GK | CZE | Ondřej Mastný |
| 40 | DF | NGR | Ibrahim Alkasim |
| 42 | MF | CZE | Matěj Šelicha |
| 45 | FW | NGR | Musiliu Odekunle |
| 46 | MF | SEN | Ousmane Sambou |
| 51 | MF | CZE | Roman Mokrovics (on loan from Sparta Prague) |
| 70 | FW | NGR | Ibrahim Usman |
| — | DF | GRE | Marios Sinanaj |

=== Out on loan ===
Note: Flags indicate national team as defined under FIFA eligibility rules; some limited exceptions apply. Players may hold more than one non-FIFA nationality.

| No. | Pos. | Nation | Player |
|---|---|---|---|
| — | GK | CZE | Matyáš Trešl (at Zlaté Moravce) |

== Managers ==
- Tibor Duda (June 1999 – June 2000)
- Miloslav Machálek (July 2000 – September 2002)
- Roman Pivarník (October 2002 – July 2003)
- Jaroslav Netolička (July 2003 – June 2004)
- Karel Večeřa (July 2004 – June 2006)
- Milan Bokša (June 2006 – June 2007)
- Luboš Zákostelský (July 2007 – September 2007)
- Karol Marko (September 2007 – June 2009)
- Luboš Urban (July 2009 – March 2011)
- Roman Pivarník (July 2011 – June 2012)
- František Komňacký (May 2012 – December 2013)
- Petr Rada (December 2013 – September 2014)
- Roman Kučera (September 2014 – December 2014)
- Luděk Klusáček (December 2014 – September 2015)
- Milan Bokša (September 2015 – January 2016)
- Michal Hipp (January 2016 – September 2016)
- Michal Bílek (September 2016 – April 2017)
- Josef Jinoch (April 2017 – June 2017)
- Ivan Kopecký (June 2017 – December 2017)
- Martin Svědík (December 2017 – November 2018)
- Radim Kučera (December 2018 – July 2020)
- Aleš Křeček (July 2020 – June 2021)
- Jan Kameník (June 2021 – Oct 2022)
- Ondřej Smetana (October 2022 – April 2023)
- David Oulehla (May 2023 – August 2024)
- Marek Jarolím (Sept 2024 – Oct 2025)
- Jiří Lerch (Oct 2025 – March 2026)
- Marek Nikl (March 2026 –present)

== History in domestic competitions ==
- 1993–00 Moravian–Silesian Football League
- 2000–05 Czech National Football League
- 2005–06 Czech First League
- 2006–12 Czech National Football League
- 2012–18 Czech First League
- 2018– Czech National Football League

- Seasons spent at Level 1 of the football league system: 7
- Seasons spent at Level 2 of the football league system: 18
- Seasons spent at Level 3 of the football league system: 7
- Seasons spent at Level 4 of the football league system: 0

=== Czech Republic ===
| Season | League | Placed | Pld | W | D | L | GF | GA | GD | Pts | Cup |
|---|---|---|---|---|---|---|---|---|---|---|---|
| 1993–94 | 3. liga | 7th | 30 | 12 | 8 | 10 | 49 | 41 | +8 | 32 | Round of 64 |
| 1994–95 | 3. liga | 7th | 30 | 12 | 6 | 12 | 43 | 36 | +7 | 42 | First round |
| 1995–96 | 3. liga | 13th | 28 | 8 | 5 | 15 | 42 | 60 | –18 | 29 | Quarter-finals |
| 1996–97 | 3. liga | 12th | 28 | 9 | 5 | 14 | 29 | 50 | –21 | 32 | First round |
| 1997–98 | 3. liga | 11th | 30 | 10 | 8 | 12 | 38 | 44 | –6 | 38 | Round of 32 |
| 1998–99 | 3. liga | 3rd | 30 | 15 | 7 | 8 | 51 | 34 | +17 | 52 | Round of 64 |
| 1999–00 | 3. liga | 2nd | 28 | 16 | 7 | 5 | 48 | 23 | +25 | 55 | Round of 64 |
| 2000–01 | 2. liga | 6th | 30 | 13 | 8 | 9 | 38 | 31 | +7 | 47 | Round of 32 |
| 2001–02 | 2. liga | 7th | 30 | 12 | 6 | 12 | 47 | 46 | +1 | 42 | Round of 32 |
| 2002–03 | 2. liga | 2nd | 30 | 16 | 4 | 10 | 43 | 28 | +15 | 52 | Round of 64 |
| 2003–04 | 2. liga | 5th | 30 | 13 | 9 | 8 | 40 | 32 | +8 | 48 | Semi-finals |
| 2004–05 | 2. liga | 2nd | 28 | 13 | 9 | 6 | 46 | 30 | +16 | 48 | Round of 32 |
| 2005–06 | 1. liga | 15th | 30 | 6 | 11 | 13 | 20 | 36 | –16 | 29 | Round of 32 |
| 2006–07 | 2. liga | 5th | 30 | 14 | 9 | 7 | 49 | 26 | +23 | 51 | Round of 64 |
| 2007–08 | 2. liga | 7th | 30 | 11 | 10 | 9 | 42 | 35 | +7 | 43 | Round of 32 |
| 2008–09 | 2. liga | 3rd | 30 | 15 | 6 | 9 | 36 | 27 | +9 | 51 | Round of 32 |
| 2009–10 | 2. liga | 4th | 30 | 15 | 7 | 8 | 57 | 37 | +20 | 52 | Round of 64 |
| 2010–11 | 2. liga | 3rd | 30 | 15 | 8 | 7 | 49 | 29 | +20 | 53 | First round |
| 2011–12 | 2. liga | 2nd | 30 | 16 | 7 | 7 | 45 | 29 | +16 | 55 | Round of 32 |
| 2012–13 | 1. liga | 10th | 30 | 7 | 15 | 8 | 36 | 42 | –6 | 36 | Round of 16 |
| 2013–14 | 1. liga | 8th | 30 | 10 | 7 | 13 | 45 | 50 | –5 | 37 | Quarter-finals |
| 2014–15 | 1. liga | 10th | 30 | 10 | 6 | 14 | 33 | 38 | –5 | 36 | Round of 64 |
| 2015–16 | 1. liga | 11th | 30 | 8 | 7 | 15 | 31 | 54 | –23 | 31 | Round of 16 |
| 2016–17 | 1. liga | 14th | 30 | 6 | 9 | 15 | 26 | 47 | –21 | 27 | Round of 16 |
| 2017–18 | 1. liga | 15th | 30 | 8 | 6 | 16 | 30 | 48 | –18 | 30 | Round of 16 |
| 2018–19 | 2. liga | 2nd | 30 | 17 | 7 | 6 | 50 | 33 | +17 | 58 | Round of 32 |
| 2019–20 | 2. liga | 6th | 30 | 14 | 7 | 9 | 58 | 46 | +12 | 49 | Round of 32 |
| 2020–21 | 2. liga | 7th | 26 | 9 | 8 | 9 | 44 | 44 | 0 | 35 | Round of 32 |
| 2021–22 | 2. liga | 7th | 30 | 11 | 9 | 10 | 29 | 34 | –5 | 42 | Round of 16 |
| 2022–23 | 2. liga | 14th | 30 | 9 | 7 | 14 | 37 | 51 | –14 | 34 | Round of 32 |
| 2023–24 | 2. liga | 14th | 30 | 9 | 8 | 13 | 42 | 46 | –4 | 35 | Round of 32 |
| 2024–25 | 2. liga | 10th | 30 | 8 | 13 | 9 | 35 | 39 | –4 | 37 | First round |
| 2025–26 | 2. liga | 15th | 30 | 7 | 8 | 15 | 32 | 39 | –7 | 29 | Round of 32 |
