= Všesportovní stadion =

Former stadium in Hradec Králové, Czechia

- "Pod Lízátky"
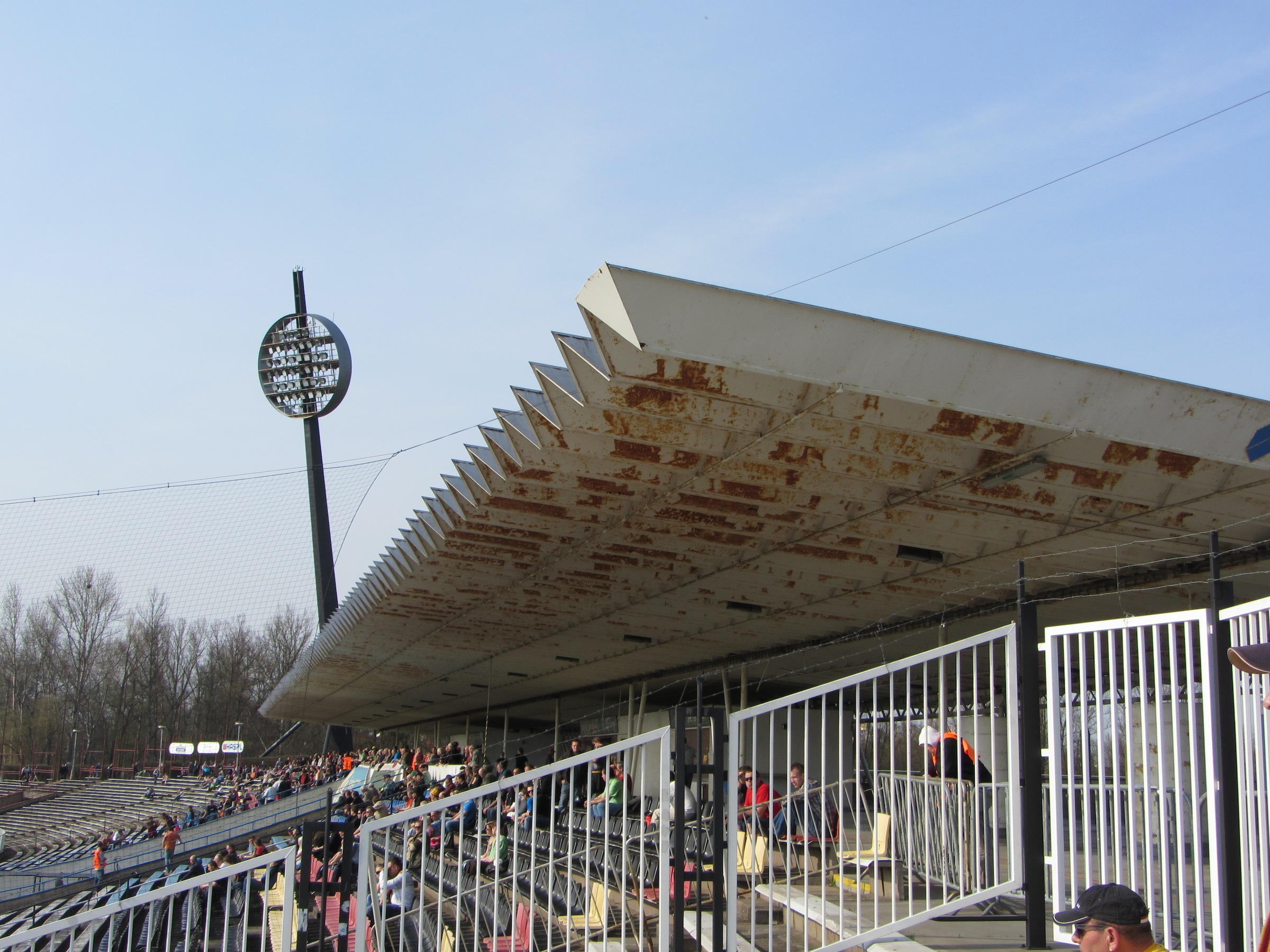
- Interactive map of Všesportovní stadion
- Location: Hradec Králové, Czech Republic
- Coordinates: 50°12′22″N 15°50′43″E
- Owner: The city of Hradec Králové
- Operator: FC Hradec Králové
- Capacity: 7,220

Construction
- Opened: 1966
- Renovated: 1974, 2007
- Closed: 2021

Tenant
- FC Hradec Králové

Všesportovní stadion was a multi-purpose stadium in Hradec Králové, Czech Republic. It was used mostly for football matches as the home stadium of FC Hradec Králové. The stadium was opened on 11 May 1966. When Hradec were promoted to the Czech First League in 2010, the capacity of the stadium was set to be reduced to 4,000, as league rules determine the capacity to be the number of separate seats. In time for the opening game of the 2010–11 Czech First League, the capacity was increased to 6,000. In the 2011–12 Czech First League, the capacity was increased to 7,220. The stadium was set to be demolished in 2017 and replaced with a new stadium Malšovická aréna with an increased capacity and suitability for Czech national team matches. The demolition of Všesportovní stadion started on 25 September 2017. The stadium would continue to be used with reduced capacity during the first stage of demolition, and was in use until the club's final game there in May 2021, an end-of-the-season second league fixture against Líšeň.
