= Miroslav Koubek =

Czech former goalkeeper and manager (born 1951)

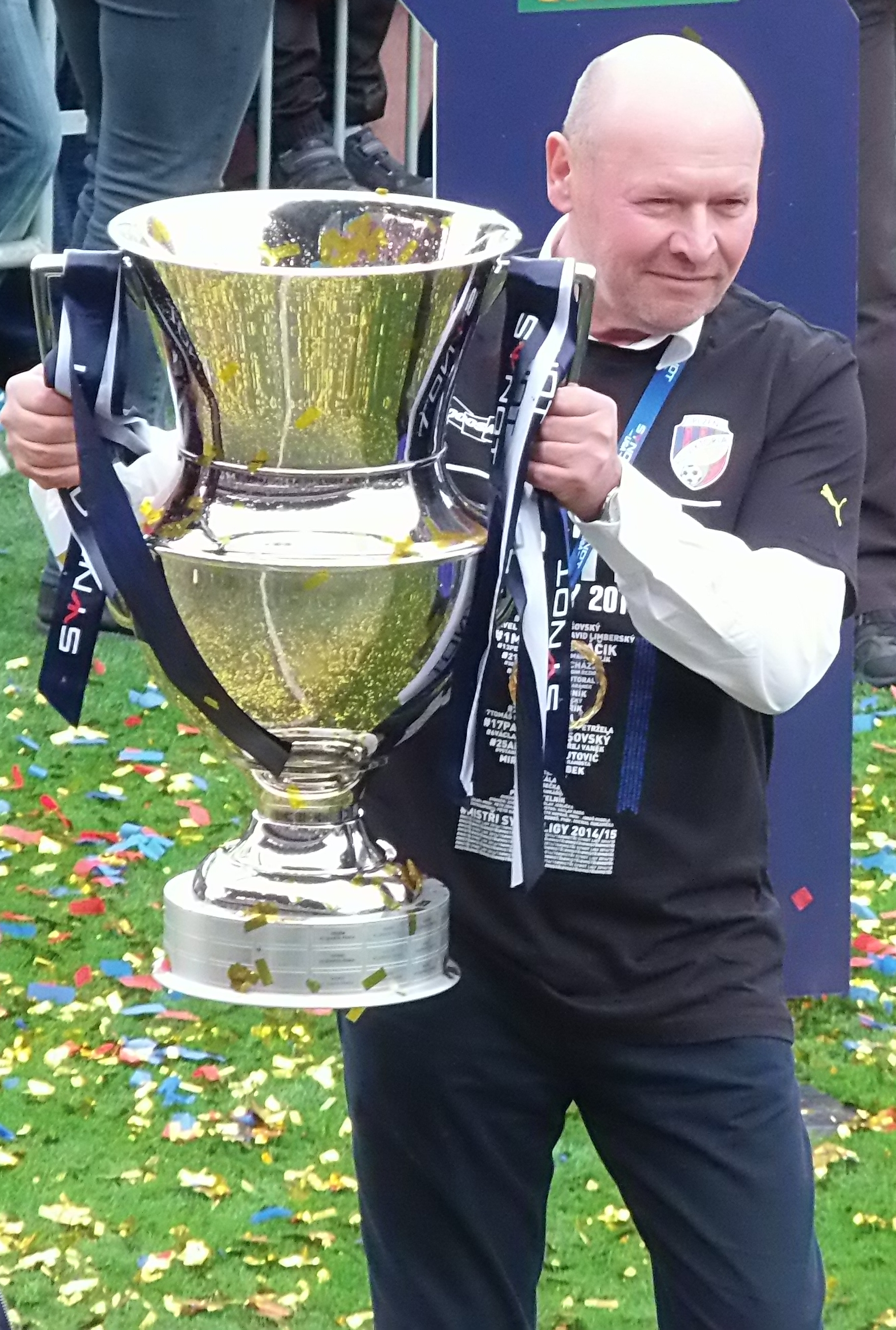
- Koubek during the title celebration of Viktoria Plzeň in 2015

Personal information
- Date of birth: 1 September 1951 (age 75)
- Place of birth: Prague, Czechoslovakia
- Position: Goalkeeper

Youth career
- 1961–1968: Union Žižkov
- 1968–1971: Admira Prague

Senior career*
Years	Team	Apps	(Gls)
1971–1973	VTJ Slaný		
1973–1978	Poldi Kladno		
1978–1982	Sparta Prague		

Managerial career
- 1983–1988: Poldi Kladno
- 1989–1991: VTŽ Chomutov
- 1992–1995: 1. FC Amberg
- 1995: Kladno
- 1997–2000: Kladno
- 2000–2001: Viktoria Plzeň
- 2002–2007: Kladno
- 2008: Tianjin Teda (assistant)
- 2008–2009: Zenit Čáslav
- 2009–2010: Baník Ostrava
- 2011–2012: Mladá Boleslav
- 2013–2014: Czech Republic U19
- 2013–2014: Slavia Prague
- 2014–2015: Viktoria Plzeň
- 2016–2017: Bohemians 1905
- 2021–2023: Hradec Králové
- 2023–2025: Viktoria Plzeň
- 2025–2026: Czech Republic
- * Club domestic league appearances and goals

Miroslav Koubek (born 1 September 1951) is a Czech professional football manager and former player who played as a goalkeeper. He last managed the Czech Republic national team. He won the Czech First League with Viktoria Plzeň in the 2014–15 season.

== Coaching career ==
Koubek coached several Czech clubs. He led SK Kladno to the Czech Second League title in the 2005–06 season, securing the club's return to top-flight football for the first time since 1970. In the 2008–09 season, he led FC Zenit Čáslav to second place in the Czech Second League and promotion to the First League, although Čáslav eventually sold the First League license to rivals and remained in the Second League. Koubek joined FC Baník Ostrava in June 2009, leading them to third place in the 2009–10 Czech First League. The 2010–11 season however started with miserable results for Baník, with the club losing seven of the opening 13 matches, and Koubek was sacked in October.

Koubek returned to the Czech First League as the manager of Mladá Boleslav on 28 May 2011. Koubek led Boleslav to fourth place in the 2011–12 Czech First League and qualification for the following season's UEFA Europa League. However, after a run of three consecutive league defeats, he resigned from his position in September 2012. Koubek was appointed to the manager's position at Slavia Prague in September 2013 following the resignation of former boss Michal Petrouš. He was sacked in March 2014.

In August 2014, Koubek became the new manager of FC Viktoria Plzeň and in May 2015 won his first league title. In July 2015 he celebrated the Czech Supercup with his side, who defeated Liberec 2–1. In spite of his league success, Plzeň only won once in their first four league matches of the 2015–16 season and were eliminated in the qualifying rounds of the Champions League, culminating in his departure from the role by mutual consent in mid-August 2015.

On 30 May 2016, Koubek was announced as the new manager of Bohemians 1905. Koubek was appointed to the manager's position at Hradec Králové in June 2021 following the resignation of manager Zdenko Frťala. In June 2023, Koubek returned to Plzeň for a third spell in charge of the club, signing a one-year contract, which made him the oldest coach in the league.

On 19 December 2025, Koubek was hired as manager of Czech Republic national team. In March 2026, he led his nation to qualification for the 2026 FIFA World Cup after winning both play-off ties on penalties against the Republic of Ireland and Denmark in the 2026 World Cup qualification European play-off round, marking their first appearance since 2006. On the opening day of the 2026 World Cup, Koubek became the oldest coach to manage a World Cup team, only hours after South Africa's coach Hugo Broos had broken the record. However, less than three days later, the title was passed to Dick Advocaat of the Curaçao national team, who surpassed Koubek by roughly four years. He stepped down from his position as Czech coach following the team's group-stage elimination from the World Cup.

== Managerial statistics ==
As of 29 June 2026

Managerial record by team and tenure
Team	Nat.	From	To	Record								Ref.
Team	Nat.	From	To	G	W	D	L	GF	GA	GD	Win %	Ref.
Viktoria Plzeň	(Czech Republic)	24 October 2000	1 December 2001	38	11	7	20	58	64	−6	28.95	
Kladno	(Czech Republic)	1 July 2003	1 June 2007	131	56	34	41	168	118	+50	42.75	
Čáslav	(Czech Republic)	1 June 2008	20 June 2009	31	16	9	6	44	27	+17	51.61	
Ostrava	(Czech Republic)	20 June 2009	25 October 2010	52	22	16	14	70	51	+19	42.31	
Mladá Boleslav	(Czech Republic)	28 May 2011	15 September 2012	50	21	11	18	73	61	+12	42.00	
Czech Republic U19	(Czech Republic)	10 July 2013	24 January 2014	9	6	1	2	21	12	+9	66.67	
Slavia Prague	(Czech Republic)	19 September 2013	3 March 2014	12	4	4	4	9	15	−6	33.33	
Viktoria Plzeň	(Czech Republic)	12 August 2014	16 August 2015	40	28	5	7	81	35	+46	70.00	
Bohemians 1905	(Czech Republic)	30 May 2016	5 April 2017	26	8	7	11	25	31	−6	30.77	
Hradec Králové	(Czech Republic)	1 June 2021	25 April 2023	66	24	17	25	93	90	+3	36.36	
Viktoria Plzeň	(Czech Republic)	1 July 2023	29 September 2025	126	76	24	26	245	123	+122	60.32	
Czech Republic	(Czech Republic)	19 December 2025	29 June 2026	7	2	3	2	11	12	−1	28.57	
Career Total				587	273	138	176	898	630	+268	46.51	

== Honours ==
=== Managerial ===
Kladno

- Czech Second League: 2005–06

Viktoria Plzeň

- Czech First League: 2014–15
- Czech Supercup: 2015

Individual

- Czech First League Manager of the Season: 2024
