= Tomáš Bernady =

Czech footballer and manager

Personal information
- Date of birth: 24 October 1969 (age 57)
- Place of birth: Ostrava, Czechoslovakia
- Height: 1.93 m (6 ft 4 in)
- Position: Goalkeeper

Youth career
- 1978–1990: Baník Ostrava

Senior career*
Years	Team	Apps	(Gls)
1990	Tatran Prešov	15	(0)
1991–1994	Baník Ostrava	48	(0)
1994–1997	Petra Drnovice	69	(0)
1997–2001	Slovan Bratislava		
2001–2005	Matador Púchov		
2005–2007	Inter Bratislava		
2007–2009	Baník Ostrava		
2009–2010	Sokol Zbyslavice		

Managerial career
- 2011: MFK Karviná B
- 2014: FC Baník Ostrava
- * Club domestic league appearances and goals

Tomáš Bernady (born 24 October 1969) is a Czech former football goalkeeper who currently works as a football manager. He took over as manager of Banik Ostrava in October 2013.

He represented Czechoslovakia in the 1989 FIFA World Youth Championship. He won Slovak league title in 1999 with Slovan Bratislava, Czechoslovak Cup in 1991 with Baník Ostrava and Slovak Cup in 2003 with Matador Púchov.

== Honours ==
Individual

- Toulon Tournament Best Goalkeeper: 1990,
- Slovak Super Liga Team of the Season: 2002–03
