= Miroslav Soukup =

Czech football manager (born 1965)

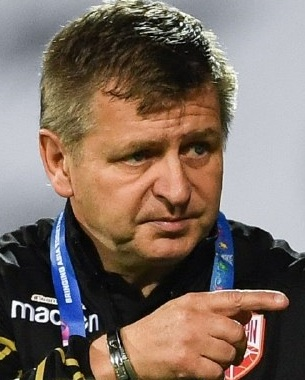
- Soukup as Bahrain manager in 2019

Personal information
- Date of birth: 13 November 1965 (age 60)
- Place of birth: Prachatice, Czechoslovakia
- Position: Midfielder

Youth career
- Tatran Prachatice

Senior career*
Years	Team	Apps	(Gls)
1983–1985	Tatran Prachatice		
1985–1987	RH Žižkov		
1987–1990	Tatran Prachatice		
1990–1995	TV Freyung		
1995–1997	FC Salzweg		
1997–2001	TV Freyung		

Managerial career
- 1995–2000: Tatran Prachatice (youth)
- 1995–1997: FC Salzweg (player-manager)
- 1997–2001: TV Freyung (player-manager)
- 2001–2003: Tatran Prachatice
- 2001–2004: České Budějovice (youth)
- 2004–2008: Zbrojovka Brno (assistant)
- 2004–2005: Czech Republic U18
- 2005–2006: Czech Republic U19
- 2006–2007: Czech Republic U20
- 2007–2008: Czech Republic U21
- 2008–2009: Egypt U20
- 2010–2012: Slovácko
- 2012–2013: České Budějovice
- 2014–2016: Yemen
- 2016–2019: Bahrain
- 2021–2022: Iraq U23
- 2022–2024: Yemen
Medal record
Men's football
Representing Czech Republic (as manager)
FIFA U-20 World Cup
Runner-up	2007
- * Club domestic league appearances and goals

Miroslav Soukup (born 13 November 1965) is a Czech football manager and former player who formerly managed the Yemen national team. Previously, he was in charge of the Iraq national Olympic team.

== Managerial career ==
He was one of the managers leading successful Czech Republic national under-20 football team, runners-up at the 2007 FIFA U-20 World Cup held in Canada and was also manager of bronze medal Czech Republic national under-19 football team at the 2006 UEFA European Under-19 Football Championship. He was manager of Egypt national under-20 football team from early 2008 until late 2009, during which time he led the team as the host nation at the 2009 FIFA U-20 World Cup, where they advanced from the group stage before losing to Costa Rica in the last 16.

He became the coach of 1. FC Slovácko, replacing Josef Mazura on 18 April 2010. After losing the opening three games of the 2012–13 Czech First League, Soukup was relieved of his duties. Soukup was not out of football for long, as he took over at Czech First League side SK Dynamo České Budějovice in September 2012 following the dismissal of František Cipro. He didn't last long as he was sacked in the winter break of the 2012–13 season after a 6–1 friendly match loss to Mladá Boleslav in February 2013. On 13 May 2014 he was confirmed as the head coach of Yemen national football team. On 27 July 2016, Soukup was appointed as the new manager of the Bahrain national football team. Under his guidance, Bahrain progressed to the knockout stage for the first time since 2004, and it was considered as a success. Despite this, Soukup left the position after the Asian Cup. In 2022 he became Yemen national team manager for the second time, but had to fulfil his duties remotely due to the security situation in the country.
