= Martin Kotůlek =

Czech footballer and manager

Personal information
- Date of birth: 11 September 1969 (age 57)
- Place of birth: Olomouc, Czechoslovakia
- Height: 1.78 m (5 ft 10 in)
- Position: Defender

Youth career
- 1976–1979: SK Těšetice
- 1980–1986: TJ Náměšť na Hané

Senior career*
Years	Team	Apps	(Gls)
1986–1989	Sigma Olomouc	19	(0)
1989–1990	Dukla Banská Bystrica	39	(0)
1990–2000	Sigma Olomouc	237	(9)
2000–2004	Stavo Artikel Brno	90	(3)
2004–2005	SFC Opava	27	(0)
2005–2008	1. HFK Olomouc	47	(1)
Total		459	(13)

International career
1991	Czechoslovakia	1	(0)
1994–1998	Czech Republic	7	(0)

Managerial career
- 2013: Sigma Olomouc
Medal record
Men's football
Representing Czech Republic
UEFA European Championship
Runner-up	1996 England
- * Club domestic league appearances and goals

Martin Kotůlek (born 11 September 1969) is a Czech football coach and former player.

At club level, Kotůlek made over 400 appearances in the top leagues of Czechoslovakia and later the Czech Republic, playing for most of his career with hometown club Sigma Olomouc. He was part of the Czech Republic team UEFA Euro 1996 that won the silver medal. In total, Kotůlek made one appearance for Czechoslovakia and seven for the Czech Republic after its independence.

== Biography ==
Kotůlek played his 400th league game in the Czech (including previously Czechoslovak) top flight in 2004 for SFC Opava, but his team lost against Zlín. His team went on to be relegated in last place in the 2004–05 Gambrinus liga and his career in the top division was over, having earned 412 appearances and 12 goals.

During his last season as a footballer, Kotůlek worked as an assistant coach at 1. HFK Olomouc in the 2007–08 Czech 2. Liga. He became assistant coach of Sigma Olomouc in 2008 under newly-appointed head coaches Zdeněk Psotka, Petr Uličný, and Roman Pivarník. Following Pivarník's dismissal in May 2013, Kotůlek was appointed as caretaker manager until the end of the season, his first such appointment.
