= Lukáš Vaculík =

Lukáš Vaculík may refer to:

- Lukáš Vaculík (actor) (born 1962), Czech actor
- Lukáš Vaculík (footballer) (born 1983), Czech footballer
- Lukáš Vaculík (skier) (born 1986), Czech skier
