= Václav Kotal =

Czech footballer and manager

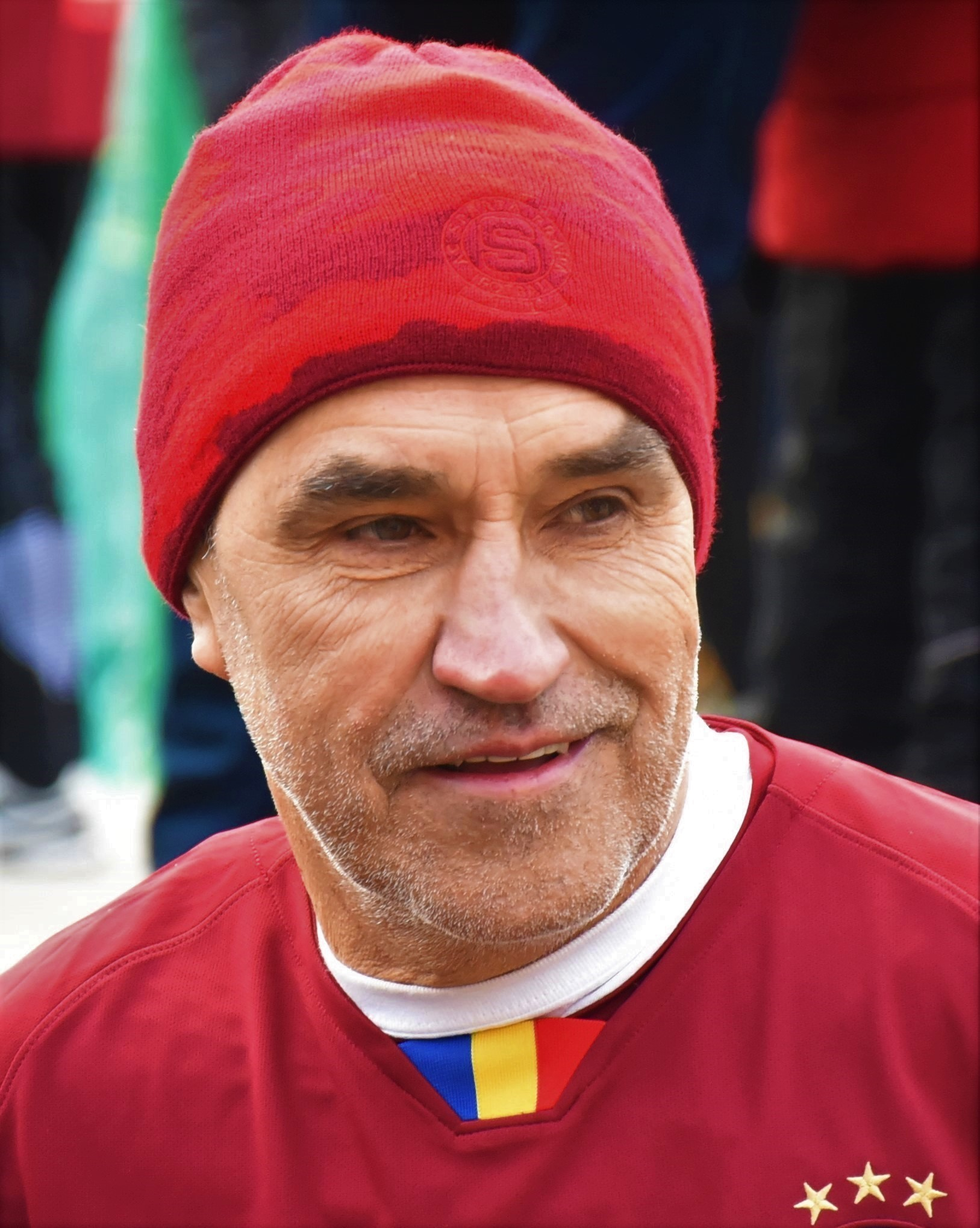
- Image of Vàclav Kotal

Personal information
- Date of birth: 2 October 1952 (age 74)
- Place of birth: Náchod, Czechoslovakia
- Position: Forward

Youth career
- 1960–1972: TJ Náchod

Senior career*
Years	Team	Apps	(Gls)
1973–1982	Sparta Prague	168	(31)
1982–1987	FC Hradec Králové	87	(21)
1987–1988	Omonia Aradippou		
1988–1993	1. SV Appel Vitis		

Managerial career
- 1995–1998: FC Hradec Králové (sports director)
- 1998–2000: FK Kolín
- 2000–2001: Baumit Jablonec
- 2001–2003: Sparta Prague B
- 2003–2004: FC Dinamo Moscow (assistant)
- 2005–2006: Sparta Prague B
- 2006–2007: AC Sparta Prague (scout)
- 2007–2008: SK Kladno (assistant)
- 2008: FC Viktoria Plzeň (assistant)
- 2009–2012: FC Hradec Králové
- 2012–2013: Baumit Jablonec
- 2013–2016: FC Zbrojovka Brno
- 2016–2019: Czech Republic U17
- 2019–2020: Sparta Prague B
- 2020–2021: Sparta Prague
- 2022–2023: Viktoria Žižkov (sporting director)
- 2023–2024: Hradec Králové
- * Club domestic league appearances and goals

Václav Kotal (born 2 October 1952) is a Czech former football player and current manager. As a player, he spent ten seasons at Sparta Prague, playing 168 matches in the Czechoslovak First League and winning two Czechoslovak Cups.

He was announced as the new manager of Hradec Králové on 24 March 2009, replacing manager Oldřich Machala. In his first full season, the 2009–10 Czech 2. Liga, Kotal led Hradec Králové to the Czech 2. Liga title and therefore promotion to the top flight. In two seasons of the Czech First League, Hradec finished in 8th and 13th place. In 2012 Kotal moved to fellow Czech First League outfit FK Jablonec. He was sacked before the end of the 2012–13 season with the club lying in fifth place in the league after a 5–1 defeat against Slavia Prague. Kotal returned to management in September 2013 as the new manager of FC Zbrojovka Brno.

== Honours ==
=== Player ===
Sparta Prague

Czechoslovak Cup (2): 1975–76, 1979–80

=== Managerial ===
Hradec Králové

Czech 2. Liga (1): 2009–10

Sparta Prague

- Czech Cup (1): 2019–20
