= Ludevít Grmela =

Czecho footballer and manager

Personal information
- Full name: Ludevít Grmela
- Date of birth: 16 April 1961 (age 65)
- Place of birth: Czechoslovakia
- Position: Midfielder

Team information
- Current team: Vítkovice (Head coach)

Senior career*
Years	Team	Apps	(Gls)
1982–1984	TJ Gottwaldov	33	(0)
1987–1990	FC Zbrojovka Brno	57	(5)
1990–1992	AEL Limassol	22	(2)

Managerial career
- FC Zbrojovka Brno (youth)
- FK Mutěnice
- TJ Slavoj Velké Pavlovice
- 2012–2013: FC Zbrojovka Brno B
- 2013: FC Zbrojovka Brno (assistant)
- 2013: FC Zbrojovka Brno
- 2014–2015: 1. SC Znojmo
- 2017–: Vítkovice
- * Club domestic league appearances and goals

Ludevít Grmela (born 16 April 1961) is a Czech football manager and former player. He is currently the head coach of Vítkovice.
