= Michal Petrouš =

Czech footballer and manager

Personal information
- Date of birth: 6 December 1969 (age 56)
- Place of birth: Czechoslovakia
- Position: Defender

Youth career
- 1976–1980: Viktoria Žižkov
- 1980–1988: Bohemians Praha

Senior career*
Years	Team	Apps	(Gls)
1988–1991	Bohemians Praha		
1991–1993	Slavia Praha		
1993–1995	Viktoria Žižkov		
1995	SK Hradec Králové		
1996	Union Cheb		
1996–1997	Viktoria Žižkov		
1997–2002	Bohemians Praha		
2002–2004	Viktoria Plzeň		

Managerial career
- 2010–2011: Slavia Prague
- 2013: Slavia Prague
- 2014: Czech Republic U18
- 2014–2015: Czech Republic U19
- 2015–2018: Slavia Prague (youth)
- 2018–: Bohemians 1905 (youth)
- * Club domestic league appearances and goals

Michal Petrouš (born 6 December 1969) is a Czech football manager and former player. He worked as a manager of Slavia Prague on two occasions and was in charge of Czech youth national teams. His younger brother Adam is also a former football player.

He participated in the 1989 FIFA World Youth Championship.

He was announced as the new manager of Slavia Prague in September 2010, following the resignation of Karel Jarolím. He continued in his role at Slavia until the ninth round of the 2011–12 Czech First League when he lost his job, leaving the team in 13th position.

Petrouš returned as caretaker manager of Slavia in 2013 after manager Petr Rada left his position with five games of the 2012–13 season remaining.

He was appointed to the position of the Czech Under-18 national team in 2014 and later moved on to manage the Under-19 team.
