= Na Litavce =

Football stadium in Příbram, Czech Republic

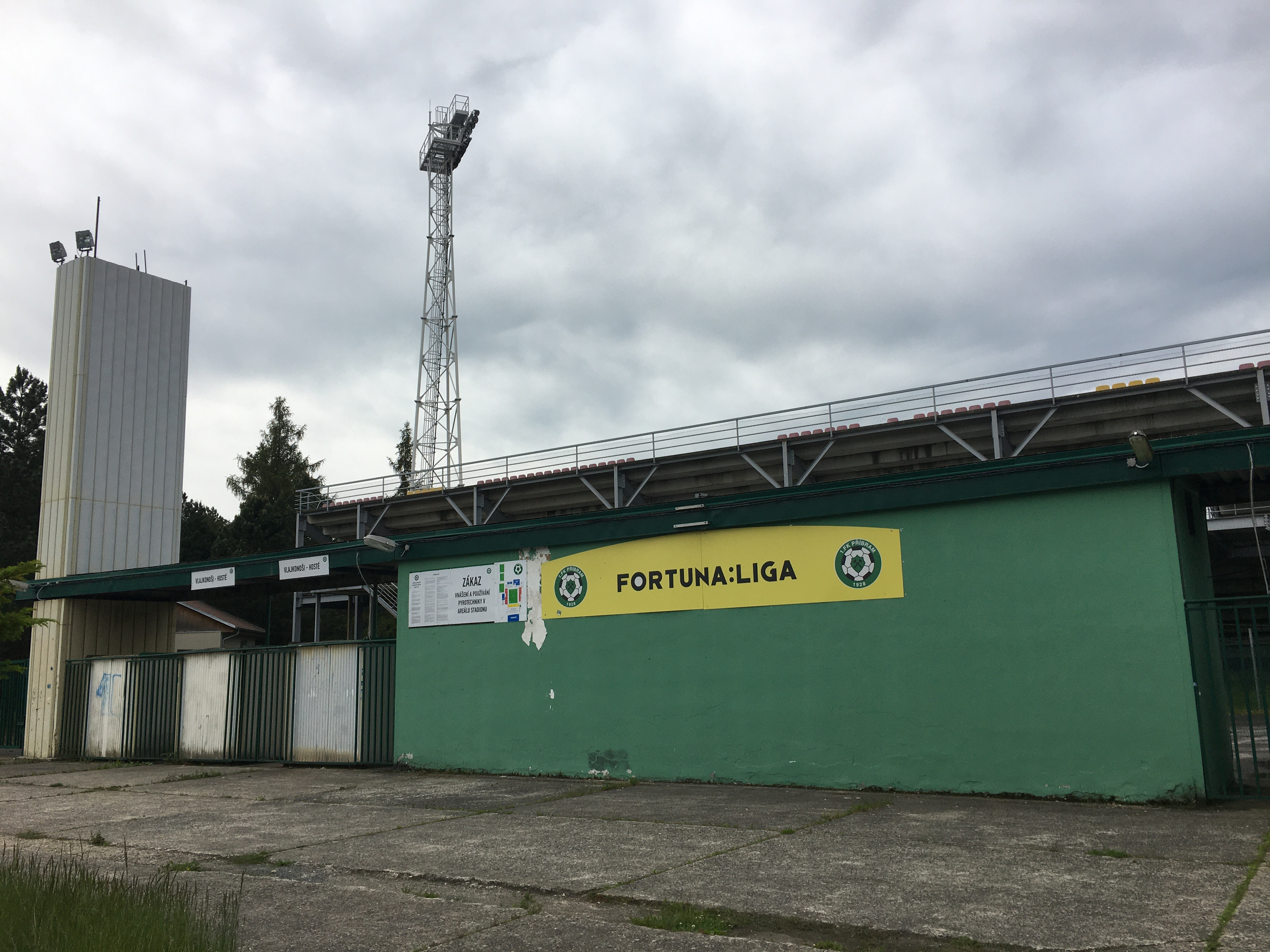
- Interactive map of Na Litavce
- Location: Lazec 60, Příbram, Czech Republic, 261 01
- Coordinates: 49°40′37″N 13°58′35″E
- Capacity: 9,100
- Field size: 105m x 68m

Construction
- Opened: 1955
- Renovated: 1978–1980

Tenant
- FK Příbram (1997–)

Na Litavce is a football stadium in Příbram, Czech Republic. It is currently used as the home ground of FK Příbram. The stadium holds 9,100 people.

== History ==
The stadium was opened on 11 September 1955, starting the series of promotions of the home club Baník Příbram from the regional competition up to the third highest nationwide league within 13 years and to the second division in 1974 (only for five seasons). The name of the stadium is derived from the name of the Litavka river, located just behind the west stand.

The major reconstruction of stadium was made between 1978 and 1980. The construction was funded by the Uranium Mines company (Czech: Uranové doly), many of the miners and company workers joined the work voluntarily. New stands and entry gate were built as well as two buildings with flats and hotel rooms, which remain the mark of the stadium. The western stand was roofed and the capacity of the stadium was around 11,000 spectators.

In 1996 FC Portál Příbram merged with Dukla Prague and the new team played in Prague for a year before moving to Příbram in 1997. The eastern stand was roofed and the third stand was built. The stadium had to be modernized to correspond with the Football Association of the Czech Republic's new standards, all stands are for seated spectators, which lowered the capacity to 9,100, and the floodlight towers were erected. Due to flooding of the nearby Litavka river, the stadium was submerged during the 2002 European floods. This caused a game with Slavia Prague to be postponed.
