= David Vavruška =

Czech football coach (born 1972)

Personal information
- Date of birth: 14 September 1972 (age 54)
- Place of birth: Czechoslovakia

Managerial career
- Years: Team
- 2011–2012: Příbram
- 2012–2013: SFC Opava
- 2014–2015: Slovan Liberec
- 2015–2016: Teplice
- 2016–2017: Viktoria Žižkov
- 2017–2020: Mladá Boleslav (youth)
- 2020: Viktoria Žižkov
- 2020–2021: Viktoria Žižkov (youth)
- 2021: SFC Opava (youth)

David Vavruška (born 14 September 1972) is a Czech football coach. His last job was as a head coach of Czech 2. Liga football club Viktoria Žižkov. He took over at the half way stage of the 2016–17 season with the club comfortably in a mid-table (7th) position in the league, shortly after the surprising departure of Zdeněk Hašek .

In May 2011, Vavruška was announced as joint caretaker manager of Příbram until the end of the season alongside František Kopač following the departure of Roman Nádvorník. On 26 May 2011, Vavruška was given the manager's position on a permanent basis with Kopač and Jiří Ryba becoming his assistants. Vavruška's departure from Příbram was announced at the end of August 2012, following a run of 12 competitive games without a win. He joined Czech 2. Liga side Opava after four matches of the 2012–13 season, with the club lying in penultimate place in the league. Vavruška resigned from Opava in May 2013, with the club still in the same position, with the club having taken just 18 points in his 22 matches in charge. The club was subsequently relegated at the end of the season.

Vavruška was appointed as the manager of Viktoria Žižkov in 2016. He was sacked on 4 October 2017 after a run of poor results, including a 5–1 home defeat by his former club, Opava. In late 2020 he again led Viktoria Žižkov, but less than three weeks after starting his role, he was announced as the head coach of the club's youth team. He subsequently took over as the head coach of the youth team at Opava, but less than three months into the 2021–22 season, he was relieved of his duties, with his team having a goal difference of 9 for, 41 against at the time.

== Managerial honours ==
Liberec

- Czech Cup (1): 2014–15
