= Petr Rada =

Czech football coach and former player (born 1958)

Personal information
- Date of birth: 21 August 1958 (age 68)
- Place of birth: Prague, Czechoslovakia
- Height: 1.72 m (5 ft 8 in)
- Position: Defender

Youth career
- ?–1973: FSC Libuš
- 1973–1977: Dukla Prague
- 1977–1979: VTJ Čáslav

Senior career*
Years	Team	Apps	(Gls)
1979–1988	Dukla Prague	257	(11)
1988–1990	Fortuna Düsseldorf	52	(3)
1990–1991	Rot-Weiss Essen	7	(1)
1991	Dukla Prague	12	(4)
1991–1992	Toronto Blizzard	87	(26)
1992	SSV Jahn Regensburg	9	(1)
1992–1993	FK Chmel Blšany	15	(2)
1993–1995	Fortuna Düsseldorf	30	(2)
1995–1996	FC Bohemians Prague	41	(19)
Total		510	(80)

International career
1982–1986	Czechoslovakia	11	(2)

Managerial career
- 1996-1997: Fortuna Düsseldorf (assistant)
- 1997-1998: SK Slavia Prague (assistant)
- 1998: SK Slavia Prague
- 1998-2000: SK Slavia Prague (assistant)
- 1998-2000: Czech Republic (assistant)
- 2000–2001: Teplice
- 2001–2002: Viktoria Plzeň
- 2003: FK Chmel Blšany (assistant)
- 2003–2007: Jablonec
- 2006–2008: Czech Republic (assistant)
- 2007–2008: Teplice
- 2008–2009: Czech Republic
- 2010–2011: Slovan Liberec
- 2011–2012: Teplice
- 2012–2013: SK Slavia Prague
- 2013–2014: Vysočina Jihlava
- 2015: Teplice
- 2016–2017: Příbram
- 2017: Sparta Prague
- 2017–2022: Jablonec
- 2022–2025: Dukla Prague
- * Club domestic league appearances and goals

Petr Rada (born 21 August 1958) is a Czech football coach and former player. He represented Czechoslovakia internationally in the 1980s and managed the Czech Republic national football team between 2008 and 2009. He is well known for his arguments with fans or trainer colleagues and also for impulsive style of coaching.

Before being named national team manager in July 2008, Rada worked as an assistant for then national team coach Karel Brückner from 2006 to 2008, and also as an assistant to Jozef Chovanec from 1998 to 2001 when Chovanec was manager of the Czech national team. Rada has also been head manager of eight various Czech clubs: FK Teplice (on four separate occasions), FC Viktoria Plzeň, FK Jablonec (twice), FC Slovan Liberec, SK Slavia Prague, FC Vysočina Jihlava, Příbram Sparta Prague and Dukla Prague.

== Playing career ==
In his playing days, Rada was a defender, who starred for Dukla Prague for nine years, from 1979 to 1988. He won the Czechoslovak First League with them in 1979 and 1982. Rada also made eleven appearances for his national team, Czechoslovakia.

== Management career ==
Rada joined Jablonec as manager in October 2003 and led the team to the final of the 2006–07 Czech Cup, where they lost against Sparta Prague. After nearly four years at the club, Rada decided to leave the club in 2007.

On 8 April 2009, he was sacked as coach of the Czech Republic national team after the team won just two of their six qualification matches for the 2010 FIFA World Cup.

He returned to coaching on 26 October 2010 as the new coach of FC Slovan Liberec. In June 2011, it was announced he was returning to coach FK Teplice for his third spell.

Rada became manager of Slavia Prague in 2012. He left Slavia in April 2013 with the club in eighth place in the league, with five matches of the season remaining. Rada led Dukla Prague from 2022 to 2025. In that time he celebrated promotion to the Czech First League by winning the 2023–24 Czech National Football League, and survival in the relegation playoffs at the end of the 2024–25 Czech First League. He received a red card in his final match.

== Controversy ==
On 21 March 2024, Rada was banned by Disciplinary commission FAČR for eight months and fined 80,000 Czech crowns for shouting racist insult to Zbrojovka Brno manager Tomáš Polách in a second league 3–3 home draw. Rada stated that he shouted only "ty zoufalej cikáne" ("you desperate gypsy"), will appeal along with Dukla Prague and rejected the racist undertones of his words. On 22 April 2024, Appeals Committee upheld the previous verdict, but reduced ban to three months.

== Personal life ==
Rada is the father of goalkeeper Filip Rada.

== Career statistics ==
=== International ===
Appearances and goals by national team and year
National team	Year	Apps	Goals
Czechoslovakia	1982	1	0
Czechoslovakia	1983	3	2
Czechoslovakia	1984	3	0
Czechoslovakia	1985	1	0
Czechoslovakia	1986	3	0
Total		11	2

Scores and results list Czechoslovakia's goal tally first, score column indicates score after each Rada goal.

List of international goals scored by Petr Rada
No.	Date	Venue	Opponent	Score	Result	Competition
1	16 November 1983	Stadion Evžena Rošického, Prague, Czechoslovakia	Italy	1–0	2–0	UEFA Euro 1984 qualification
2	16 November 1983	Stadion Evžena Rošického, Prague, Czechoslovakia	Italy	2–0	2–0	UEFA Euro 1984 qualification

=== Managerial ===
As of 27 February 2021

Team	From	To	Record							
Team	From	To	G	W	D	L	GF	GA	GD	Win %
Jablonec	21 October 2003	1 June 2007	122	47	35	40	140	127	+13	38.52
Teplice	1 June 2007	17 July 2008	32	17	5	10	45	29	+16	53.13
Czech Republic	17 July 2008	8 April 2009	8	2	4	2	8	6	+2	25.00
Liberec	26 October 2010	1 July 2011	17	9	3	5	29	16	+13	52.94
Teplice	1 July 2011	1 June 2012	37	16	12	9	48	35	+13	43.24
Slavia Prague	1 June 2012	30 April 2013	27	8	10	9	31	31	+0	29.63
Jihlava	26 November 2013	30 September 2014	27	9	5	13	35	40	−5	33.33
Teplice	17 February 2015	30 May 2015	18	6	5	7	23	24	−1	33.33
Příbram	22 August 2016	7 January 2017	12	2	3	7	12	22	−10	16.67
Sparta	13 March 2017	28 May 2017	10	5	4	1	14	9	+5	50.00
Jablonec	13 December 2017		122	60	23	39	192	142	+50	49.18
Career totals			432	181	109	142	531	454	+77	41.90

== Honours ==
=== Player ===
FK Dukla Prague

- Czechoslovak First League winner: 1981-1982
- Czechoslovak First League 2nd Place: 1980-1981, 1983-1984, 1987-1988
- Czechoslovak First League 3rd Place: 1985-1986
- Czechoslovak Cup winner: 1980-1981, 1982-1983, 1984-1985

Fortuna Düsseldorf

- 2. Bundesliga winner: 1988-1989
- 2. Bundesliga 3rd place: 1994-1995
- Oberliga Nordrhein winner: 1993-1994

FK Chmel Blšany

- Bohemian Football League winner: 1992-1993

=== Assistant Coach ===
Slavia Prague

- Czech First League 2nd place: 1999-2000
- Czech First League 3rd place: 1998-1999
- Czech Cup winner: 1998-1999

=== Managerial ===
Slavia Prague

- Czech First League 2nd place: 1997-1998

FK Jablonec

- Czech First League 3rd place: 2017-2018, 2020-2021
- Czech Cup runner-up: 2006-2007, 2017–18

Sparta Prague

- Czech First League 3rd place: 2016-2017

FK Dukla Prague

- Czech Second League winner: 2023-2024

=== Individual ===
Czech Coach of the Year: 3d place 2018, 2019, 2020.

Czech First league Manager of the month: March 2014, March 2018, May 2018, December 2020, April 2021.

Czech Second league Manager of the month: April 2023, August 2023.

=== Records ===
Most matches as a manager in the Czech First League: 476 matches.

Most clubs coached as a manager in the Czech First league: 8 Teams (shared with Jiří Kotrba, Jaroslav Šilhavý, Petr Uličný and Milan Bokša.
