= 2011–12 Czech First League =

19th season of top-tier football league in Czech Republic

Czech First League
- Season: 2011–12
- Champions: Liberec
- Relegated: Bohemians 1905; Viktoria Žižkov
- Champions League: Liberec
- Europa League: Sparta Prague; Viktoria Plzeň; Mladá Boleslav
- Matches: 240
- Goals: 635 (2.65 per match)
- Top goalscorer: David Lafata (25 goals)
- Biggest home win: Jablonec 5–0 Bohemians 1905; Plzeň 5–0 Hradec Králové; Slavia Prague 5–0 Hradec Králové
- Biggest away win: Č.Budějovice 1–5 Jablonec; Bohemians 1905 0–4 Sparta Prague; Plzeň 0–4 Olomouc; Č.Budějovice 0-4 Liberec
- Highest scoring: Olomouc 4–4 Příbram
- Highest attendance: 18,299; Sparta Prague 3–0 Slavia Prague (26 September 2011)
- Lowest attendance: 0 Slavia Prague 3–1 Příbram (14 August 2011)
- Average attendance: 4,710

The 2011–12 Czech First League, known as the Gambrinus liga for sponsorship reasons, was the 19th season of the Czech Republic's top-tier football league. It began on 29 July 2011 and was originally due to end on 26 May 2012, although due to the Czech Republic's qualification for the UEFA Euro 2012, the end of the season was brought forward to 12 May 2012. Viktoria Plzeň were the defending champions, having won their first Czech Republic championship the previous season.

Sparta Prague started the season with eight consecutive wins, the first such occurrence in league history. Sparta broke their own record when they won their ninth straight league match and opened up a 10-point lead at the top of the table.

The title was decided on the last day of the season, with Liberec hosting Viktoria Plzeň in the knowledge that a win for either team would seal the title, with a draw being enough for Liberec to retain first place. In front of a sold-out stadium at Stadion u Nisy, Liberec held the visitors to a goalless draw, winning the league for the third time since 2002.

== Teams ==
Ústí nad Labem and Zbrojovka Brno were relegated to the 2011–12 Czech 2. Liga after finishing last and second to last, respectively, in the 2010–11 season. Ústi nad Labem therefore immediately returned to the second tier, while Brno completed a nineteen-year tenure in the top flight.

The relegated terms were replaced by 2010–11 2. Liga champions Dukla Prague and Viktoria Žižkov. Viktoria Žižkov returned after a two-year absence, while Dukla Prague made their debut in the league; however, the Dukla Prague name returned to the league after seventeen seasons, with a club of the same name having played in the top Czech football division until then. The newly promoted clubs were granted licenses to play top-division football on 13 June 2011.

Viktoria Žižkov became the first team to be relegated on 5 May 2012 after Ostrava beat Příbram.

=== Stadia and locations ===
Locations of clubs in the 2011–12 Czech First League

Club	Location	Stadium	Capacity	2010–11 position
Baník Ostrava	Ostrava	Bazaly	17,372	14th
Bohemians 1905	Prague	Synot Tip Arena ^{Note 1}	21,000	6th
Dukla Prague	Prague	Stadion Juliska ^{Note 2}	4,560	2L, 1st
Dynamo České Budějovice	České Budějovice	E-On Stadion	6,681	11th
FC Hradec Králové	Hradec Králové	Všesportovní stadion	7,220	8th
FK Jablonec	Jablonec	Stadion Střelnice	6,280	3rd
FK Mladá Boleslav	Mladá Boleslav	Městský stadion (Mladá Boleslav)	5,000	5th
1. FK Příbram	Příbram	Na Litavce	9,100	12th
Sigma Olomouc	Olomouc	Andrův stadion	12,566	4th
Slavia Prague	Prague	Synot Tip Arena	21,000	9th
1. FC Slovácko	Uherské Hradiště	Městský fotbalový stadion Miroslava Valenty	8,121	13th
Slovan Liberec	Liberec	Stadion u Nisy	9,900	7th
Sparta Prague	Prague	Generali Arena	20,558	2nd
FK Teplice	Teplice	Na Stínadlech	18,221	10th
Viktoria Plzeň	Plzeň	Stadion města Plzně	13,000	1st
Viktoria Žižkov	Prague	FK Viktoria Stadion	5,600	2L, 2nd

Notes:

1. Ďolíček stadion does not meet the football association criteria, therefore Bohemians are forced to play at Synot Tip Arena.
2. FK Dukla Prague played one home match at Stadion Evžena Rošického due to the implementation of under-soil heating at Juliska.

=== Personnel and kits ===
Note: Flags indicate national team as has been defined under FIFA eligibility rules. Players may hold more than one non-FIFA nationality.

Team	Manager^{1}	Captain	Kit manufacturer	Shirt sponsor
Baník Ostrava	(Czech Republic) Pavel Malura	(Czech Republic) Martin Lukeš	Nike	Fortuna
Bohemians 1905	(Czech Republic) Jozef Weber	(Czech Republic) Radek Sňozík	Adidas	Fortuna
Dukla Prague	(Czech Republic) Luboš Kozel	(Czech Republic) Jan Vorel	Adidas	Bwin then Staeg
Dynamo České Budějovice	(Czech Republic) František Cipro	(Czech Republic) David Horejš	Adidas	AVE
Hradec Králové	(Czech Republic) Václav Kotal	(Czech Republic) Roman Fischer	Jako	City of Hradec Králové
Jablonec	(Czech Republic) František Komňacký	(Czech Republic) Petr Pavlík	Umbro	Baumit
Mladá Boleslav	(Czech Republic) Miroslav Koubek	(Czech Republic) Marek Kulič	Nike	Škoda
Příbram	(Czech Republic) David Vavruška	(Czech Republic) Aleš Hruška	Adidas	Startip
Sigma Olomouc	(Czech Republic) Petr Uličný	(Czech Republic) Radim Kučera	Adidas	Tipsport
Slavia Prague	(Czech Republic) Martin Poustka	(Czech Republic) Lukáš Jarolím	Umbro	Synot Tip
Slovácko	(Czech Republic) Miroslav Soukup	(Czech Republic) Vít Valenta	Kappa	Z-GROUP Steel holding
Slovan Liberec	(Czech Republic) Jaroslav Šilhavý	(Czech Republic) Tomáš Janů	Nike	Fortuna
Sparta Prague	(Slovakia) Jozef Chovanec	(Czech Republic) Marek Matějovský	Nike	Fortuna
Teplice	(Czech Republic) Petr Rada	(Czech Republic) Petr Lukáš	Umbro	AGC
Viktoria Plzeň	(Czech Republic) Pavel Vrba	(Czech Republic) Pavel Horváth	Puma	Doosan Group
Viktoria Žižkov	(Czech Republic) Roman Nádvorník	(Czech Republic) Tomáš Procházka	Adidas	None

- ^{1} According to current revision of List of Czech Football League managers

=== Managerial changes ===
Team	Outgoing manager	Manner of departure	Date of vacancy	Table	Incoming manager	Date of appointment
Baník Ostrava	(Slovakia) Karol Marko	Sacked	30 July 2011	14th (10–11)	(Czech Republic) Pavel Malura	31 July 2011
České Budějovice	(Czech Republic) Jiří Kotrba	Removed from position	7 September 2011	15th	(Czech Republic) František Cipro	7 September 2011
Slavia Prague	(Czech Republic) Michal Petrouš	Sacked	2 October 2011	13th	(Czech Republic) František Straka	2 October 2011
Viktoria Žižkov	(Czech Republic) Martin Pulpit	Sacked	23 November 2011	15th	(Czech Republic) Roman Nádvorník	23 November 2011
Sigma Olomouc	(Czech Republic) Zdeněk Psotka	Sacked	27 November 2011	16th	(Czech Republic) Petr Uličný	8 December 2011
Bohemians 1905	(Czech Republic) Pavel Medynský	Sacked	6 March 2012	12th	(Czech Republic) Jozef Weber	7 March 2012
Slavia Prague	(Czech Republic) František Straka	Resigned	8 March 2012	11th	(Czech Republic) Martin Poustka	14 March 2012
Baník Ostrava	(Czech Republic) Pavel Malura	Sacked	26 March 2012	15th	(Czech Republic) Radoslav Látal	26 March 2012

- ^1 Slavia manager František Straka resigned on 8 March. Assistant manager Martin Poustka was appointed to serve as caretaker manager for the next match against Jablonec, which was just three days later.

== League table ==
Pos	Team	Pld	W	D	L	GF	GA	GD	Pts	Qualification or relegation
1	Slovan Liberec (C)	30	20	6	4	68	29	+39	66	Qualification for Champions League second qualifying round
2	Sparta Prague	30	20	4	6	51	25	+26	64	Qualification for Europa League third qualifying round (Note: Sigma Olomouc, the 2011–12 Czech Cup winner, were initially to enter the third qualifying round of the Europa League. However, UEFA banned them from participating in Europa League over the club’s involvement in a corruption scandal. As a result, Sparta Prague, the second-placed team of the league, entered the Europa League third qualifying round instead of the second qualifying round, and Mladá Boleslav, the fourth-placed team of the league, will take one of Czech Republic's Europa League places in the second qualifying round.)
3	Viktoria Plzeň	30	19	6	5	66	33	+33	63	Qualification for Europa League second qualifying round
4	Mladá Boleslav	30	15	5	10	49	34	+15	50	Qualification for Europa League second qualifying round
5	Teplice	30	12	10	8	36	30	+6	46	
6	Dukla Prague	30	11	9	10	42	35	+7	42	
7	Slovácko	30	12	5	13	29	32	−3	41	
8	Jablonec	30	11	7	12	54	43	+11	40	
9	Příbram	30	11	6	13	44	56	−12	39	
10	Dynamo České Budějovice	30	9	8	13	30	51	−21	35	
11	Sigma Olomouc	30	11	10	9	42	38	+4	34 (Note: Sigma Olomouc were deducted 9 points following a disciplinary commission judgement regarding their 2009 corruption case.)	Banned from 2012–13 European competitions
12	Slavia Prague	30	8	10	12	28	34	−6	34	
13	Hradec Králové	30	8	7	15	22	38	−16	31	
14	Baník Ostrava	30	7	7	16	31	48	−17	28	
15	Bohemians 1905 (R)	30	6	6	18	20	54	−34	24	Relegation to Czech 2. Liga
16	Viktoria Žižkov (R)	30	5	4	21	23	55	−32	19	Relegation to Czech 2. Liga

Source: Fortuna liga
Rules for classification: 1) points; 2) goal difference; 3) number of goals scored.
(C) Champions; (R) Relegated

== Results ==
Home \ Away	OST	B05	DUK	ČBU	HRK	JAB	MLA	PŘI	SIG	SLA	SLO	LIB	SPA	TEP	VPL	VŽI
Baník Ostrava		0–1	1–2	1–1	1–0	2–2	1–4	0–2	0–0	3–0	0–1	1–3	0–2	3–4	2–3	3–1
Bohemians 1905	0–1		0–0	2–1	0–0	1–2	0–3	2–0	1–1	2–0	1–1	1–1	0–4	0–0	2–1	1–2
Dukla Prague	4–1	2–0		4–2	4–0	1–3	1–2	2–1	0–0	0–0	2–0	1–2	1–1	0–0	2–4	3–0
Dynamo České Budějovice	0–0	3–1	3–2		1–0	1–5	1–0	4–1	1–2	1–0	2–2	0–4	2–4	1–1	0–0	1–0
Hradec Králové	0–1	2–0	0–2	0–0		0–0	2–0	0–1	1–2	1–1	0–1	0–3	1–0	3–2	0–1	1–0
Jablonec	4–0	5–0	0–2	1–1	2–0		0–0	5–1	2–0	4–0	1–0	0–2	2–4	0–1	0–2	3–1
Mladá Boleslav	2–1	2–0	3–1	3–1	1–1	3–0		2–2	2–3	3–2	1–0	1–4	2–0	0–1	0–1	2–0
Příbram	1–2	3–0	2–2	1–2	0–0	4–3	2–0		4–1	0–0	0–4	2–3	0–3	0–0	2–1	2–1
Sigma Olomouc	3–0	4–0	2–1	0–0	0–2	1–1	1–1	4–4		1–0	1–1	2–4	0–1	1–0	2–3	2–1
Slavia Prague	0–0	3–1	0–0	2–0	5–0	0–0	1–1	3–1	1–0		0–1	1–3	1–1	0–0	2–1	2–0
Slovácko	1–0	3–2	1–0	2–0	0–3	1–0	1–0	2–3	0–1	1–3		1–2	0–2	0–0	1–3	2–1
Slovan Liberec	3–2	3–0	1–2	4–0	3–1	2–2	2–1	2–0	1–1	2–1	0–0		1–3	0–2	0–0	4–0
Sparta Prague	2–0	1–0	0–0	3–0	1–0	2–1	0–3	0–2	1–0	3–0	1–0	0–3		2–2	1–3	4–1
Teplice	1–1	2–0	4–0	0–1	0–3	3–2	1–3	2–1	3–1	0–0	2–1	1–0	0–1		3–4	0–0
Viktoria Plzeň	1–1	4–1	1–1	4–0	5–0	4–2	3–2	5–0	0–4	3–0	1–0	2–2	0–2	2–0		4–1
Viktoria Žižkov	0–3	0–1	1–0	2–0	1–1	4–2	1–2	1–2	2–2	1–0	0–1	1–4	0–2	0–1	0–0	

Source: Fortuna liga
Legend: Blue = home team win; Yellow = draw; Red = away team win.

== Top goalscorers ==
As of 10 May 2012

Rank	Player	Club	Goals
1	(Czech Republic) David Lafata	Jablonec	25
2	(Slovakia) Marek Bakoš	Plzeň	16
3	(Czech Republic) Jiří Štajner	Liberec	15
4	(Slovakia) Michal Breznaník	Liberec	12
5	(Cameroon) Léonard Kweuke	Sparta Prague	11
5	(Slovakia) Ivan Lietava	Dukla Prague	11
5	(Czech Republic) Michael Rabušic	Liberec	11

== Attendances ==
Rank	Club	Average	Highest
1	Sparta Praha	10,322	18,299
2	Viktoria Plzeň	7,009	11,412
3	Baník Ostrava	5,968	13,127
4	Slovan Liberec	5,787	10,000
5	Slavia Praha	5,745	16,516
6	Sigma Olomouc	5,493	8,094
7	Slovácko	5,274	7,638
8	Hradec Králové	4,727	7,220
9	Teplice	3,876	8,586
10	Jablonec	3,591	6,040
11	Mladá Boleslav	3,355	4,596
12	České Budějovice	3,144	6,029
13	Příbram	3,138	6,621
14	Bohemians	2,924	7,545
15	Viktoria Žižkov	2,649	5,200
16	Dukla Praha	2,434	4,590

== See also ==
- 2011–12 Czech Cup
- 2011–12 Czech 2. Liga
