= 2008–09 Czech First League =

16th season of top-tier football league in Czech Republic

Czech First League
- Season: 2008–09
- Champions: Slavia Prague
- Relegated: Zlín; Viktoria Žižkov
- Champions League: Slavia Prague; Sparta Prague
- Europa League: Liberec; Olomouc; Teplice (via Domestic Cup)
- Matches: 240
- Goals: 582 (2.43 per match)
- Top goalscorer: Andrej Kerić (15)
- Biggest home win: Jablonec 6–1 Zlín; Slavia Prague 5–0 Bohemians; Slavia Prague 5–0 Kladno; Sparta Prague 5–0 Kladno; Viktoria Plzeň 5–0 Zlín
- Biggest away win: 9 matches: Zlín 2–5 Ostrava; Ostrava 1–4 Viktoria Plzeň; České Budějovice 1–4 Sparta Prague; Mladá Boleslav 1–4 Liberec; Sparta Prague 1–4 Slavia Prague; Mladá Boleslav 0–3 Sparta Prague; Příbram 0–3 Teplice; Zlín 0–3 Slavia Prague; Viktoria Žižkov 0–3 Ostrava
- Highest scoring: Ostrava 5–4 Bohemians
- Highest attendance: 20,500; Sparta Prague 1–4 Slavia Prague (6 October 2008)
- Lowest attendance: 853; Viktoria Žižkov 0–2 Viktoria Plzeň (30 May 2009)
- Average attendance: 4,664

The 2008–09 Czech First League, known as the Gambrinus liga for sponsorship reasons, was the sixteenth season of Czech Republic's top-tier of football. It began on 2 August 2008 and ended on 30 May 2009. Slavia Prague were the defending champions. Slavia secured their 17th title overall after a 3–1 win away against Viktoria Žižkov in 28th round. They were the first club to defend Czech title since the 2000–01 season.

== Promotion and relegation ==
Most and Bohemians 1905 were relegated to the second division after finishing last and second to last, respectively, in the previous season.

FK Bohemians Prague (Střížkov) (as champions) and 1. FK Příbram (as runners-up) were promoted from the second division.

== Stadia and locations ==
Location of clubs in the 2008–09 Czech First League

=== Managerial changes ===
Team	Outgoing manager	Manner of departure	Date of vacancy	Incoming manager	Date of appointment
Český Budějovice	(Czech Republic) Jan Kmoch	Sacked	26 August 2008	(Czech Republic) Pavel Tobiáš	27 August 2008
Viktoria Žižkov	(Slovakia) Stanislav Griga	Sacked	4 September 2008	(Czech Republic) Josef Csaplár	
Zlín	(Czech Republic) Josef Mazura	Sacked		(Czech Republic) Stanislav Levý	
Plzen	(Czech Republic) Jaroslav Šilhavý	Sacked	6 October 2008	(Czech Republic) Pavel Vrba	8 October 2008
Sparta Prague	(Czech Republic) Vítězslav Lavička	Sacked		(Czech Republic) Jozef Chovanec	
Brno	(Czech Republic) Petr Uličný	Sacked	29 October 2008	(Czech Republic) Miroslav Beránek	10 December 2008
Viktoria Žižkov	(Czech Republic) Josef Csaplár	Sacked		(Czech Republic) Zdeněk Ščasný	
Zlín	(Czech Republic) Stanislav Levý	Sacked		(Czech Republic) Ladislav Minář	29 December 2008
Ostrava	(Czech Republic) Karel Večeřa	Sacked	20 April 2009	(Czech Republic) Verner Lička	20 April 2009
Pribram	(Italy) Massimo Morales	Sacked	4 May 2009	(Czech Republic) Petr Čuhel	4 May 2009

- ^1 Zlin manager Josef Mazura was relieved of his duties after the 7th round of matches; Ladislav Minář took over as caretaker manager until the appointment of Stanislav Levý before the 12th round.
- ^2 Brno appointed Aleš Křeček to the position of caretaker manager after the 11th round of matches until Miroslav Beránek took over in the winter break.

== League table ==
Pos	Team	Pld	W	D	L	GF	GA	GD	Pts	Qualification or relegation
1	Slavia Prague (C)	30	18	8	4	57	25	+32	62	Qualification for Champions League third qualifying round
2	Sparta Prague	30	16	8	6	48	25	+23	56	Qualification for Champions League third qualifying round
3	Slovan Liberec	30	14	10	6	41	28	+13	52	Qualification for Europa League third qualifying round
4	Sigma Olomouc	30	13	9	8	39	36	+3	48	Qualification for Europa League second qualifying round
5	Jablonec	30	14	4	12	43	37	+6	46 (Note: Jablonec ahead of Mladá Boleslav on head-to-head record; Jablonec–Mladá Boleslav 1–1, Mladá Boleslav–Jablonec 1–2.)	
6	Mladá Boleslav	30	12	10	8	39	38	+1	46	
7	Teplice	30	12	7	11	33	25	+8	43 (Note: Teplice ahead of Viktoria Plzeň on head-to-head record; Teplice–Viktoria Plzeň 3–0, Viktoria Plzeň–Teplice 1–1.)	Qualification for Europa League play-off round (Note: Teplice won the 2008–09 Czech Cup and qualified for the play-off round of the UEFA Europa League.)
8	Viktoria Plzeň	30	11	10	9	45	38	+7	43	
9	Baník Ostrava	30	11	6	13	38	36	+2	39	
10	Dynamo České Budějovice	30	7	15	8	30	37	−7	36	
11	Brno	30	9	8	13	32	36	−4	35	
12	Příbram	30	9	7	14	30	40	−10	34	
13	Bohemians Prague (Střížkov)	30	10	4	16	33	46	−13	34	
14	Kladno	30	8	7	15	21	41	−20	31	
15	Tescoma Zlín (R)	30	7	8	15	26	49	−23	29	Relegation to Czech 2. Liga
16	Viktoria Žižkov (R)	30	5	7	18	27	45	−18	22	Relegation to Czech 2. Liga

Source: Fortuna liga
Rules for classification: 1) points; 2) head-to-head points; 3) head-to-head goal difference; 4) head-to-head goals scored; 5) goal difference; 6) number of goals scored.
(C) Champions; (R) Relegated

== Results ==
Home \ Away	OST	BOH	BRN	ČBU	JAB	KLA	MLA	PŘI	SIG	SLA	LIB	SPA	TEP	ZLI	VPL	VŽI
Baník Ostrava		5–4	0–0	0–0	3–1	1–0	0–2	2–0	1–1	2–3	0–0	2–0	1–0	1–3	1–4	0–0
Bohemians Prague (Střížkov)	1–0		1–2	2–0	4–3	3–1	2–1	1–0	1–2	0–0	2–0	4–3	1–0	1–0	0–2	0–0
Brno	2–0	0–0		1–1	1–0	2–0	0–2	1–2	1–2	1–0	4–1	0–2	1–1	3–0	1–2	0–2
Dynamo České Budějovice	3–2	0–0	1–1		2–1	3–0	1–1	2–2	1–1	2–2	2–0	1–4	3–0	1–0	1–1	3–2
Jablonec	2–1	2–1	2–0	2–0		1–1	1–1	4–0	1–0	1–2	0–1	1–0	0–2	6–1	3–0	2–0
Kladno	0–1	1–0	1–0	0–0	1–2		0–1	1–0	2–0	2–1	0–0	0–2	1–1	1–1	1–0	1–0
Mladá Boleslav	0–2	1–0	2–4	0–0	1–2	2–1		3–1	2–1	0–0	1–4	0–3	1–0	1–0	1–1	0–0
Příbram	2–1	2–1	0–1	3–0	2–0	2–0	1–1		2–1	0–0	1–2	1–1	0–3	3–0	2–2	3–0
Sigma Olomouc	2–1	3–0	1–1	1–1	1–1	1–3	2–2	4–1		1–0	2–1	0–1	2–1	1–1	2–1	2–0
Slavia Prague	1–0	5–0	2–1	2–0	2–0	5–0	3–3	1–0	3–0		2–2	1–1	3–1	1–0	3–2	2–1
Slovan Liberec	0–0	2–1	0–0	2–0	3–0	2–0	3–3	1–0	0–1	2–1		3–0	1–0	2–1	1–1	2–1
Sparta Prague	1–0	1–0	4–0	0–0	3–2	5–0	1–0	3–0	1–1	1–4	1–1		0–0	2–0	2–0	2–0
Teplice	1–0	1–0	1–0	4–0	3–0	2–1	2–3	0–0	0–1	0–1	1–0	0–0		2–0	3–0	2–0
Tescoma Zlín	2–5	2–0	2–1	0–0	0–1	0–0	0–2	2–0	1–1	0–3	3–3	2–1	1–1		2–0	1–0
Viktoria Plzeň	1–3	3–1	3–2	1–1	1–1	1–0	2–0	0–0	4–0	1–1	0–2	1–1	1–1	5–0		3–2
Viktoria Žižkov	0–3	4–2	1–1	2–1	0–1	2–2	1–2	2–0	1–2	1–3	0–0	1–2	3–0	1–1	0–2	

Source: Fortuna liga
Legend: Blue = home team win; Yellow = draw; Red = away team win.

== Top goalscorers ==
Final standing

Rank	Player	Club	Goals
1	(Croatia) Andrej Kerić	Slovan Liberec	15
2	(Czech Republic) Daniel Huňa	Příbram	11
2	(Czech Republic) Tomáš Necid	Slavia Prague	11
4	(Czech Republic) David Lafata	Jablonec	10
4	(North Macedonia) Riste Naumov	Viktoria Žižkov	10
4	(Czech Republic) Michal Papadopulos	Mladá Boleslav	10
7	(Tunisia) Tijani Belaïd	Slavia Prague	9
7	(Czech Republic) Michal Ordoš	Sigma Olomouc	9
7	(Czech Republic) Tomáš Sedláček	České Budějovice	9
10	(Czech Republic) Roman Dobeš	Bohemians Prague (Střížkov)	8
10	(Czech Republic) Pavel Horváth	Viktoria Plzeň	8
10	(Czech Republic) Marek Kincl	Bohemians Prague (Střížkov)	8

== Attendances ==
#	Club	Average
1	Slavia Praha	11,971
2	Sparta Praha	8,642
3	Baník Ostrava	7,822
4	Sigma Olomouc	4,903
5	Slovan Liberec	4,633
6	Mladá Boleslav	4,072
7	Viktoria Plzeň	4,005
8	Teplice	3,847
9	Zbrojovka Brno	3,842
10	Příbram	3,684
11	Viktoria Žižkov	3,398
12	České Budějovice	3,314
13	Jablonec	3,229
14	Tescoma Zlín	3,011
15	Kladno	2,419
16	Bohemians	1,903

== See also ==
- 2008–09 Czech Cup
- 2008–09 Czech 2. Liga
