= Miroslav Kouřil =

Czech footballer and manager

Personal information
- Date of birth: 16 January 1960 (age 66)
- Place of birth: Zábřeh, Czechoslovakia
- Position: Forward

Senior career*
Years	Team	Apps	(Gls)
1985–1987	SK Slavia Prague		
1987–1990	SK Sigma Olomouc		
1993–1994	SK Sigma Olomouc	6	(0)

Managerial career
- 2005–2006: Drnovice
- 2006: Fulnek
- 2007–2008: Třinec
- 2009: HFK Olomouc
- 2012–2013: Třinec
- * Club domestic league appearances and goals

Miroslav Kouřil (born 16 January 1960) is a Czech football manager and former player. His playing position was forward. Kouřil played in the Czechoslovak First League and Gambrinus liga, making over 100 league appearances between 1985 and 1994.

== Management career ==
Kouřil became the manager of FK Drnovice during the 2005–06 Czech 2. Liga, replacing Josef Mazura.

Kouřil took over at FK Fotbal Třinec in September 2007, replacing outgoing manager Miroslav Čopjak. Kouřil enjoyed success in his first match as manager, defeating FC Tescoma Zlín in the second round of the 2007–08 Czech Cup. He moved to 1. HFK Olomouc during the 2008–09 Czech 2. Liga, replacing Josef Mucha after 18 matches of the season. Despite the club being relegated to the third-tier Moravian–Silesian Football League after finishing the season in 15th place, Kouřil signed a new contract in the summer. After just six games of the following season however, he was replaced by Petr Uličný.

Kouřil returned to manage Třinec in May 2012.
