= Martin Bača =

Czech footballer

Personal information
- Date of birth: 30 September 1985 (age 41)
- Place of birth: Czechoslovakia
- Height: 1.89 m (6 ft 2 in)
- Position: Forward

Senior career*
Years	Team	Apps	(Gls)
2004–2010	Zlín	124	(12)
2008	→ Nitra (loan)		
2010–2011	Jihlava	24	(4)
2011–2013	Zlín	18	(1)

International career
2002	Czech Republic U-18	2	(0)
2003–2004	Czech Republic U-19	6	(1)
2006	Czech Republic U-21	2	(0)
- * Club domestic league appearances and goals

Martin Bača (born 30 September 1985) is a Czech former professional football player who made more than 100 appearances in the Czech First League, all of which for FC Tescoma Zlín. Bača played half a season in the Slovak First Football League for Nitra on loan in 2008, while his only other club was Jihlava, who he represented in the Czech second tier between 2010 and 2011. After returning to Zlín in 2011, he retired from professional football at the age of 27 in 2013.

== Career ==
Bača started his career at Zlín, playing 69 times in the Czech First League for the club and scoring 6 goals in the competition between 2003 and the middle of the 2007–08 season.

For the second half of the 2007–08 season Bača played in the Slovak Superliga on loan at FC Nitra. He was brought in by Nitra manager Pavel Hapal, who had previously managed Bača at Zlín. He collapsed in a March 2008 match against MFK Košice, having to be substituted in the second half. Bača subsequently scored for the club in league victories against FK AS Trenčín (2–1 away) and Dukla Banská Bystrica (1–0 at home).

After returning from his loan, Bača continued at Zlín, playing a further 40 First League games and scoring another 5 goals before the club's relegation at the end of the 2008–09 season. He continued to play for Zlín in the 2009–10 season in the second league, making 15 appearances and scoring once.

Baca scored three times in 21 league appearances in the 2010–11 Czech 2. Liga for Jihlava. At the start of the 2011–12 season he made three league appearances for the club, scoring once, before signing a two-year contract to play for Zlin again in September 2011.

Bača didn't play a single minute in the 2012–13 Czech 2. Liga, announcing his professional retirement in March 2013 at the age of 27 due to persistent injury.
