= Ladislav Minář =

Czech football manager (born 1969)

Personal information
- Date of birth: 18 June 1969 (age 57)
- Place of birth: Czechoslovakia

Managerial career
- Years: Team
- 2008: Zlín
- 2008–2010: Zlín
- 2010: Mladá Boleslav
- 2012–2014: Mladá Boleslav
- 2014: Sigma Olomouc

Ladislav Minář (born 18 June 1969) is a Czech football manager.

Minář led Zlín in the 2008–09 Gambrinus liga as caretaker manager between the dismissal of previous boss Josef Mazura in the 7th round and the appointment of Stanislav Levý in the 12th round of matches. When Levy was sacked after the team took just one point from five matches, Minář was appointed to take charge of the team for the rest of the season. The club were relegated from the league at the end of the season, and the following season the club failed to win promotion back to the top division, ultimately finishing third in the 2009–10 Czech 2. Liga. Subsequently, Minář left his position at the end of the season.

Minář was appointed caretaker manager at Mladá Boleslav towards the end of the 2010–11 Gambrinus liga. During his short term in charge, the club won the 2010–11 Czech Cup. In September 2012, Minář was again given the job of manager at Mladá Boleslav. In 2014, he was briefly appointed caretaker manager of Sigma Olomouc, before the appointment of Leoš Kalvoda. He remained at the club as sporting director until September 2025.
