= Karel Kula =

Czech footballer (born 1963)

Personal information
- Date of birth: 10 August 1963 (age 63)
- Place of birth: Třinec, Czechoslovakia
- Height: 1.81 m (5 ft 11 in)
- Position: Midfielder

Youth career
- Český Těšín
- Železárny Třinec

Senior career*
Years	Team	Apps	(Gls)
1981–1991	Baník Ostrava	188	(25)
1982–1984	→ Dukla Banská Bystrica (loan)	19	(0)
1991–1992	Stuttgarter Kickers	28	(6)
1992–1995	SG Wattenscheid 09	59	(3)
1995–1996	Železárny Třinec	39	(1)
1997–1998	Baník Ostrava	21	(0)

International career
1985–1992	Czechoslovakia	40	(5)

Managerial career
- 2006–2008: Baník Ostrava (assistant)
- 2009–2010: FK Fotbal Třinec (assistant)
- 2010–2012: Karviná
- 2013–2014: FK Fotbal Třinec
- 2015–2016: FK Fotbal Třinec
- * Club domestic league appearances and goals

Karel Kula (born 10 August 1963) is a Czech local politician and former football player and manager. He played as a midfielder and was a general manager of MFK Karviná and FK Fotbal Třinec. In 2023, he became the mayor of Český Těšín.

== Playing career ==
After making his professional debut at the age of 18 for FC Baník Ostrava, with a two-year loan during his spell at the club, Kula played more than 200 official appearances with the club. He won the Czechoslovak Cup with Baník in 2001. At 28 years old, Kula was allowed to leave the country, spending the next four years in Germany, three of those with SG Wattenscheid 09. Although he made his Bundesliga debut with Stuttgarter Kickers in the 1991–92 season, his six league goals (third in the team) were not enough to prevent relegation (in 17th position). At the age of 32, Kula returned to his country, now the Czech Republic. After two years with SK Železárny Třinec, he ended his career with Baník Ostrava in 1998.

Together with his twin brother, Vlastimil, Kula played for the youth national teams of Czechoslovakia including the 1983 FIFA World Youth Championship. He debuted for the senior squad against Sweden in June 1985. The following year, in May 1986, Kula scored his first goal during a friendly match against Iceland.

== Post-playing career ==
Kula worked as assistant manager for Baník Ostrava from 2006 until 2008 and in the same role at FK Fotbal Třinec. He became head coach of Karviná in 2010. In March 2012, Kula was replaced as manager of Karviná by assistant Marek Kalivoda. He returned to FK Fotbal Třinec for the 2013–14 season as general manager; his successor was Marek Kalivoda.

Kula became chairman of Moravian-Silesian Regional Football Association in February 2015 and mayor of Český Těšín in March 2023.

== Personal life ==
Kula is married to a woman named Ivana Lipková, with whom he has two daughters. He spends his free time regularly young training footballers in Třinec.

== Career statistics ==
=== International ===
Appearances and goals by national team and year
National team	Year	Apps	Goals
Czechoslovakia	1985	5	0
Czechoslovakia	1986	8	3
Czechoslovakia	1987	7	0
Czechoslovakia	1988	4	0
Czechoslovakia	1990	4	0
Czechoslovakia	1991	8	2
Czechoslovakia	1992	4	0
Total		40	5

Scores and results list Czechoslovakia's goal tally first, score column indicates score after each Kula goal.

List of international goals scored by Karel Kula
No.	Date	Venue	Opponent	Score	Result	Competition	Ref.
1	29 May 1986	Laugardalsvöllur, Reykjavík, Iceland	Iceland	1–0	2–1	Friendly	
2	10 August 1986	Western Sydney Stadium, Parramatta, Australia	Australia	1–0	3–0	Friendly	
3	15 October 1986	Stadion Za Lužánkami, Brno, Czechoslovakia	Finland	3–0	3–0	UEFA Euro 1988 qualification	
4	6 February 1991	Western Sydney Stadium, Parramatta, Australia	Australia	1–0	2–0	Friendly	
5	16 October 1991	Andrův stadion, Olomouc, Czechoslovakia	Albania	1–0	2–1	UEFA Euro 1992 qualification	
