= Bohumil Páník =

Czech football manager

Personal information
- Date of birth: 31 December 1956 (age 69)
- Place of birth: Přílepy, Czechoslovakia

Managerial career
- Years: Team
- 2000–2001: Tescoma Zlín
- 2002: Sigma Olomouc
- 2003: Lech Poznań
- 2003–2004: Miedź Legnica
- 2004–2006: Pogoń Szczecin
- 2014: Hanácká Slavia Kroměříž
- 2014–2018: Fastav Zlín
- 2018–2019: Baník Ostrava
- 2020–2021: Fastav Zlín
- 2021–2022: MFK Karviná
- 2022: MFK Dubnica
- 2024–2025: TJ Slovan Bzenec
- 2026: Artis Brno B

Bohumil Páník (born 31 December 1956) is a Czech professional football manager who is currently the director of youth development at Artis Brno.

Páník graduated from pedagogy at Palacký University in Olomouc. As a football player, he played for several lower tier clubs. He began coaching in 2000 taking over Tescoma Zlín, at that time in Czech Second League. Three years later, he moved to Poland, where he coached Lech Poznań and Pogoń Szczecin in Ekstraklasa and Miedź Legnica in the third-tier.

In winter of 2014, he was appointed again as a manager of Fastav Zlín, replacing Martin Pulpit. In his first season in Zlín, he achieved promotion to Czech First League. In the 2016–17 season, Páník advanced with Zlín to the final of the Czech Football Cup, where Zlín beat Opava, thus qualifying for the group stage of UEFA Europa League. For the first time in 47 years, Zlín qualified for European competitions. In February of the 2017–18 season he was sacked from Zlín after unsatisfactory league results. In March 2018, he was hired by Baník Ostrava, replacing Radim Kučera. Managing Baník in the last ten matches of the 2017–18 season, he was able to avoid relegation.

== Honours ==
=== Managerial ===
Fastav Zlín

- Czech Cup: 2016–17
- Czechoslovak Supercup: 2017

Baník Ostrava

- Czech Cup runner-up: 2018–19
