= Roman Nádvorník =

Czech footballer and manager

Personal information
- Date of birth: 21 March 1973 (age 53)
- Place of birth: Czechoslovakia

Team information
- Current team: Artis Brno (manager)

Senior career*
Years	Team	Apps	(Gls)
- Motorlet Prague
- Česká Lípa
- Xaverov
- Benešov
- Vlašim

Managerial career
- 2009–2010: Vlašim
- 2010–2011: Příbram
- 2011: Vlašim
- 2011–2013: Viktoria Žižkov
- 2013–2018: Táborsko
- 2018: Karviná
- 2019–2020: Příbram
- 2020: Vyšehrad
- 2021–2022: AEP Kozani
- 2022: Al Dhaid
- 2022–2024: Táborsko
- 2025–2026: Opava
- 2026–: Artis Brno
- * Club domestic league appearances and goals

Roman Nádvorník (born 21 March 1973) is a Czech professional football manager and former player who is currently in charge of Czech First League club Artis Brno. He also managed Příbram and Viktoria Žižkov in the Czech top division.

== Managerial career ==
Nádvorník joined Vlašim as manager on 1 January 2009, taking over from Zdeněk Hašek. Nádvorník guided the team to the Bohemian Football League title in June 2009, with a thirteen-point lead at the end of the season.

Following a strong start to the 2010–11 Czech 2. Liga, with Vlašim leading the division on 4 October 2010, he moved to Czech First League side Příbram as a replacement for Martin Hřídel. His tenure only lasted six months however, as he was sacked in April 2011 following a sequence of five consecutive defeats. In June 2011, he returned to Vlašim as manager. After the autumn part of the 2011–12 Czech 2. Liga, Nádvorník moved to Czech First League liga side Viktoria Žižkov, replacing Martin Pulpit, with the club having taken just seven points from the opening 14 matches. Žižkov went on to be relegated with Nádvorník staying on as the club adjusted to life in the Czech 2. Liga, but with the club four points away from the promotion places after three games of the spring part of the 2012–13 season and not having scored in 291 minutes, he was replaced by Italian manager Giancarlo Favarin. Nádvorník joined Czech 2. Liga side Táborsko in April 2013 with the objective of saving the club's status in the division. He was replaced as manager at Táborsko in the spring of 2014 due to personal issues. On 13 September 2022, Nádvorník was named as new head coach of Silon Táborsko.

On 21 March 2025, Nádvorník was appointed as manager of Opava. On 23 March 2026, Nádvorník was named as new head coach of Artis Brno.

== Honours ==
=== Managerial ===
Vlašim

- Bohemian Football League: 2008–09
