= Jaroslav Švach =

Czech footballer (1973–2020)

Personal information
- Date of birth: 3 January 1973
- Place of birth: Czechoslovakia
- Date of death: 28 May 2020 (aged 47)
- Height: 1.85 m (6 ft 1 in)
- Position: Defender

Senior career*
Years	Team	Apps	(Gls)
1993–2008	Zlín	180	(16)
2007–2008	→ Zhenis Astana (loan)		
2008	→ Opava (loan)		

International career
1994	Czech Republic U21	4	(1)
- * Club domestic league appearances and goals

Jaroslav Švach (3 January 1973 – 28 May 2020) was a Czech football defender. He played in the Czech First League for Zlín, playing a total of eight seasons in the top flight.

Švach played international football at under-21 level for Czech Republic U21.

Švach died on 28 May 2020, at the age of 47, after suffering a stroke.
