= MFK Karviná =

- Full name: Městský fotbalový klub Karviná
- Founded: 2003; 23 years ago
- Ground: Městský stadion
- Capacity: 4,833
- Chairman: Petr Hort
- Manager: Roman West
- League: Czech National Football League
- 2025–26: Czech First League, 8th of 16 (administratively relegated)
- Website: www.mfkkarvina.cz
Home colours	Away colours	Third colours

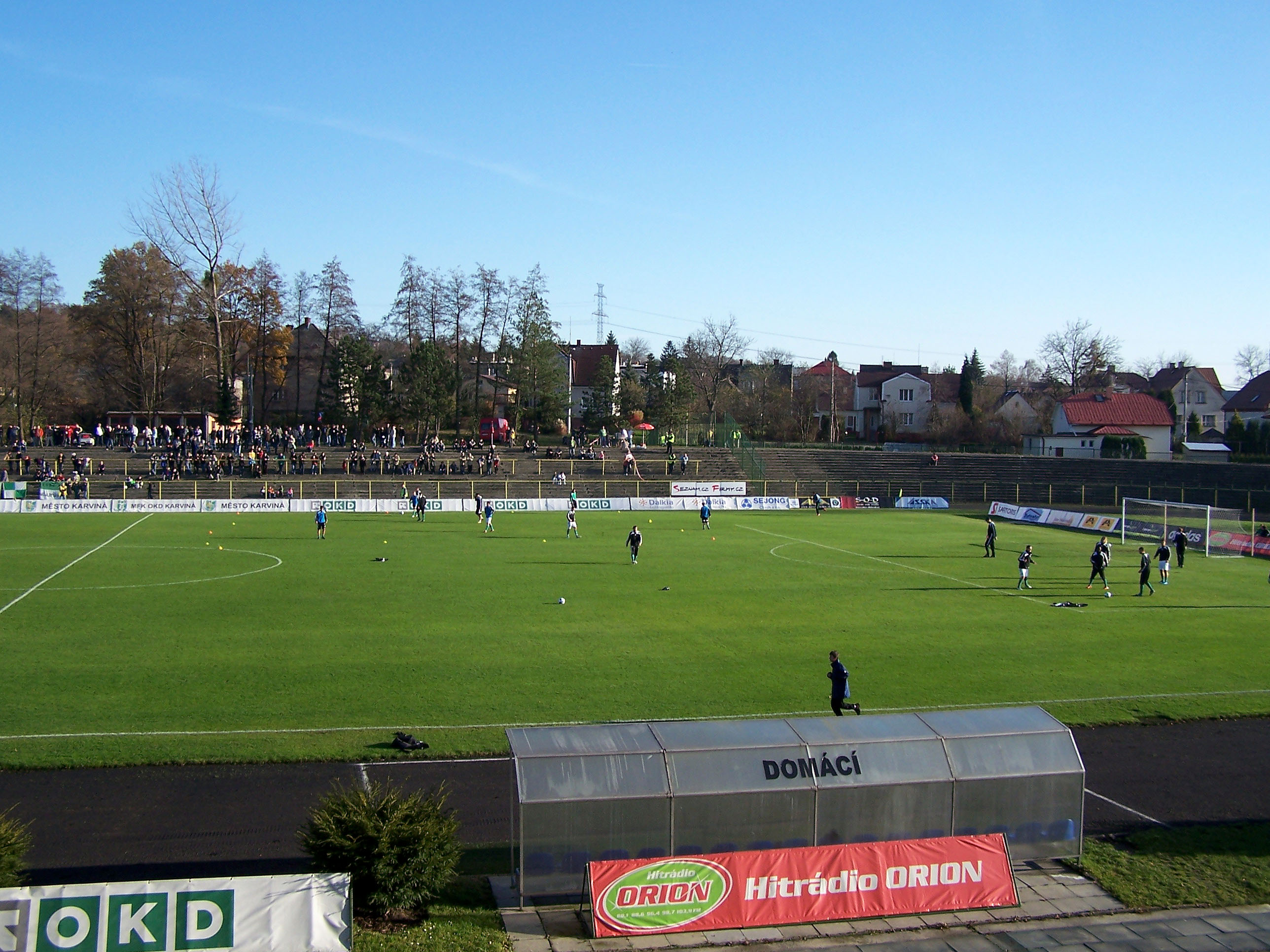
MFK Karviná players practising before a 2009 home Czech Cup match against SK Slavia Prague

MFK Karviná is a professional football club located in Karviná, Czech Republic. It plays in the Czech National Football League after it was administratively relegated in 2026. The team's colours are green and white.

== History ==
Karviná as a multi-ethnic city of Cieszyn Silesia was a home to many football clubs, which were established by particular ethnic groups after World War I. At that time many football clubs of Polish, German, Czech and Jewish communities were founded. Most known and strongest Polish club was Polonia Karwina founded in 1919. After World War II German and Jewish clubs were not re-established. Czech and Polish clubs still existed until the 1950s, when as a part of communist unification of sport life in Czechoslovakia Czech clubs were joined to ZSJ OKD Mír Karviná and Polish Polonia Karwina incorporated into that club.

The club played at the top national level of competition in the 1996–97 Czech First League and 1998–99 Czech First League, being relegated on each occasion.

In the 2000–01 Czech 2. Liga, Karviná were relegated to the Moravian–Silesian Football League (MSFL) after finishing 15th of 16 teams. They subsequently finished last in the MSFL in the 2001–02 season, signalling a second relegation in as many seasons. The club, playing in the Czech Fourth Division in the 2002–03 season, finished dead last and was thus relegated for a third time in succession.

The club merged with Jäkl Karviná in 2003, taking the name MFK Karviná. The 2003–04 season saw the club play in the Regional Championship, finishing fourth but being promoted to the Czech Fourth Division due to higher-finishing teams declining the opportunity to promote. The club subsequently spent two seasons in the Czech Fourth Division, finishing fifth in their first season and third in the 2005–06 season, winning promotion to the MSFL. The club finished 8th in their first season back in the MSFL in 2006–07 and went on to finish fourth in the 2007–08 season. They then bought the license for the second division from league champions Sigma Olomouc B, and thus qualified to play in the Czech 2. Liga. Having played in the Second League since 2008, the club celebrated promotion to the First League after the 29th round of the 2015–16 Czech National Football League.

In May 2026, Karviná won the Czech Cup and subsequently qualified for the play-off round of the 2026–27 UEFA Europa League.

On 15 June 2026, Karviná was administratively relegated to the FNL by the Ethics Committee of the FAČR due to alleged match-fixing. The club announced, that they would appeal the decision. On 28 June 2026, the club decided to withdraw its appeal and leave the league.

== Historical names ==
- 1919–38: PKS Polonia Karwina
- 1945–48: SK Polonia Karwina
- 1948–51: Sokol Polonia Karviná
- 1951–53: Sokol OKD Mír Karviná
- 1953–61: Baník Karviná Mír
- 1961–94: Baník 1. máj Karviná
- 1994–95: FC Karviná–Vítkovice (after merger with FC Vítkovice Kovkor)
- 1995–03: FC Karviná
- 2003–08: MFK Karviná (after merger with Jäkl Karviná)
- 2008–present: MFK OKD Karviná

== Players ==
=== Current squad ===
As of 5 September 2026

Note: Flags indicate national team as defined under FIFA eligibility rules; some limited exceptions apply. Players may hold more than one non-FIFA nationality.

No.	Pos.	Nation	Player
3	MF	NGA	Yahaya Lawali
5	MF	CIV	Adama Kone
6	MF	CZE	Radim Breite
7	MF	CZE	Jakub Selnar
8	MF	CZE	Adam Kronus
9	MF	CZE	Ibrahim Aldin
10	MF	CZE	Denny Samko
11	MF	CZE	Adam Čičovský
14	DF	CZE	Jiří Hamza (on loan from Pardubice)
15	DF	CZE	Lukáš Endl
17	DF	NGA	Yahaya Muhammad
18	MF	CZE	Štěpán Míšek (on loan from Pardubice)
19	DF	SVN	Nino Milić
21	DF	SRB	Alex Marković (on loan from Zbrojovka Brno)

No.	Pos.	Nation	Player
22	DF	CZE	Lukáš Rajtmajer
23	GK	CZE	Ondřej Schovanec
24	DF	CZE	Jan Chytrý
25	DF	CZE	Jiří Fleišman
27	FW	CZE	Ondřej Šašinka
29	FW	SVK	Jakub Pira (on loan from Baník Ostrava)
30	GK	CZE	Jakub Lapeš
31	MF	GUI	Ousmane Condé
32	DF	GHA	Sayibu Yakubu
34	GK	CZE	Adam Vodička
72	MF	NGA	James Bello (on loan from Viktoria Plzeň)
93	FW	BFA	Faycal Konaté
—	MF	LTU	Sidas Praleika

=== Out on loan ===
Note: Flags indicate national team as defined under FIFA eligibility rules; some limited exceptions apply. Players may hold more than one non-FIFA nationality.

No.	Pos.	Nation	Player
—	GK	CZE	Vladimír Neuman (at Pardubice)
—	MF	CZE	Dominik Žák (at Komárno)

No.	Pos.	Nation	Player
—	FW	SVK	Matej Franko (at Tatran Prešov)
—	MF	SVN	Rok Štorman (at Kortrijk)

== Managers ==
- Leoš Kalvoda (2008–2010)
- Jiří Balcárek (2010)
- Karel Kula (2010–2012)
- Marek Kalivoda (2012)
- Pavel Malura (2012)
- Petr Maslej (2012–2013)
- Josef Mazura (2013–2014)
- Jozef Weber (2014–2017)
- Lubomír Vlk (2017)
- Josef Mucha (2017–2018)
- Lubomír Vlk (2018)
- Roman Nádvorník (2018)
- Norbert Hrnčár (2018–2019)
- František Straka (2019)
- Juraj Jarábek (2019–2021)
- Jozef Weber (2021)
- Bohumil Páník (2021–2022)
- Tomáš Hejdušek (2022–2023)
- Juraj Jarábek (2023–2024)
- Marek Bielan (2024)
- Martin Hyský (2024–2025)
- Marek Jarolím (2025–2026)
- Roman West (2026–present)

== History in domestic competitions ==
- 2003–2004 Krajský přebor
- 2004–2006 Divize E
- 2006–2008 Moravian-Silesian Football League
- 2008–2016 Czech National Football League
- 2016–2022 Czech First League
- 2022–2023 Czech National Football League
- 2023– Czech First League

- Seasons spent at Level 1 of the football league system: 8
- Seasons spent at Level 2 of the football league system: 9
- Seasons spent at Level 3 of the football league system: 2
- Seasons spent at Level 4 of the football league system: 2
- Seasons spent at Level 5 of the football league system: 1

=== Czech Republic ===
Season	League	Placed	Pld	W	D	L	GF	GA	GD	Pts	Cup
2003–04	5. liga	4th	30	14	6	10	60	43	+17	48	–
2004–05	4. liga	5th	30	15	5	10	59	51	+8	50	Round of 64
2005–06	4. liga	3rd	30	15	7	8	56	32	+24	52	Round of 64
2006–07	3. liga	8th	30	12	6	12	47	40	+7	42	First round
2007–08	3. liga	4th	30	13	11	6	48	30	+18	50	Round of 32
2008–09	2. liga	8th	30	12	7	11	45	42	+3	43	Round of 32
2009–10	2. liga	8th	30	11	6	13	44	36	+8	39	Round of 16
2010–11	2. liga	4th	30	13	7	10	42	46	–4	46	Round of 16
2011–12	2. liga	6th	30	12	7	11	36	35	+1	43	Round of 16
2012–13	2. liga	9th	30	11	9	10	43	43	0	42	Round of 64
2013–14	2. liga	8th	30	12	6	12	44	39	+5	42	Round of 32
2014–15	2. liga	7th	30	12	10	8	39	31	+8	46	Round of 32
2015–16	2. liga	1st	28	17	8	3	50	17	+33	59	Round of 16
2016–17	1. liga	10th	30	9	7	14	39	49	–10	34	Quarter-finals
2017–18	1. liga	14th	30	7	9	14	32	40	–8	30	Round of 16
2018–19	1. liga	15th	35	9	5	21	42	57	–15	32	Quarter-finals
2019–20	1. liga	14th	33	5	12	16	25	46	–21	27	Round of 32
2020–21	1. liga	12th	34	9	12	13	37	49	–12	39	Round of 32
2021–22	1. liga	16th	35	3	10	22	33	63	–30	19	Round of 16
2022–23	2. liga	1st	30	17	5	8	58	37	+21	56	Round of 16
2023–24	1. liga	14th	35	8	8	19	38	62	–24	32	Round of 64
2024–25	1. liga	10th	32	11	8	13	40	57	–17	41	Round of 64
2025–26	1. liga	8th	34	13	3	18	48	61	–13	42	Winners
2026–27	2. liga										Round of 64
