= Tomáš Procházka =

Czech footballer

Personal information
- Date of birth: 14 April 1981 (age 45)
- Place of birth: Czechoslovakia
- Height: 1.90 m (6 ft 3 in)
- Position: Midfielder

Team information
- Current team: SK Kladno

Senior career*
Years	Team	Apps	(Gls)
2001–2002	FC Viktoria Plzeň		
2002–2004	FK Mladá Boleslav		
2004–2005	→ SK Kladno (loan)		
2005–2012	FK Viktoria Žižkov	50	(4)
2012–	SK Kladno		
- * Club domestic league appearances and goals as of 31 December 2012

Tomáš Procházka (born 14 April 1981) is a professional Czech football player who currently plays for SK Kladno. He was club captain for Viktoria Žižkov in the 2010–11 season.
