= Josef Mucha =

Czech footballer

Personal information
- Date of birth: 10 July 1967 (age 59)
- Place of birth: Prostějov, Czechoslovakia
- Height: 1.85 m (6 ft 1 in)
- Position: Midfielder

Team information
- Current team: Zbrojovka Brno (assistant)

Youth career
- 1975-1985: Železárny Prostějov

Senior career*
Years	Team	Apps	(Gls)
1986–1988	RH Znojmo		
1989–1993	SK Sigma Olomouc	8	(0)
1993–1994	FC Svit Zlín	39	(5)
1995–2002	SK Sigma Olomouc	202	(28)
2002–2004	FC Tescoma Zlín	51	(6)
2004–2006	HFK Olomouc		

Managerial career
- 2008–2009: HFK Olomouc
- 2014–2017: Karviná (assistant)
- 2017–2018: Karviná
- 2018–2020: Jihlava (assistant)
- 2020–2023: Slovácko (assistant)
- 2023–: Zbrojovka Brno (assistant)
- * Club domestic league appearances and goals

Josef Mucha (Czech pronunciation: [ˈjozɛf ˈmuxa]; born 10 July 1967) is a Czech former professional football player. As a midfielder, he played in the Czech First League, making over 250 appearances over the course of 11 seasons, playing over 200 league matches for SK Sigma Olomouc as well as playing for FC Tescoma Zlín.

Mucha subsequently embarked on becoming a trainer / coach and managed or become assistant at a couple of teams. He debuted as manager by 1. HFK Olomouc during the 2008–09 Czech 2. Liga season, where he was replaced by Miroslav Kouřil after 18 matches of the season. Mucha is currently the assistant manager of Zbrojovka Brno.

He is the father of professional tennis player Karolína Muchová.

== Career ==
Mucha started his career with RH Znojmo.
