= FK Třinec =

Czech association football club

- Full name: Fotbalový klub Třinec, a.s.
- Founded: 1921; 105 years ago
- Ground: Stadion Rudolfa Labaje
- Capacity: 2,200
- Chairman: Karel Maceček
- Manager: Tomáš Jakus
- League: Czech National Football League
- 2025–26 MSFL: 1st
- Website: https://www.fotbaltrinec.cz/
| Home colours | Away colours |

FK Třinec is a football club based in Třinec, Czech Republic. It plays in the Czech National Football League. It is sponsored by the Třinec Iron and Steel Works; in the past the club bore the name of the company.

The club's highest achievement was the presence in the Czechoslovak First League, where the club was present for six seasons in the 1960s and 1970s.

== History ==
=== Czechoslovak era ===
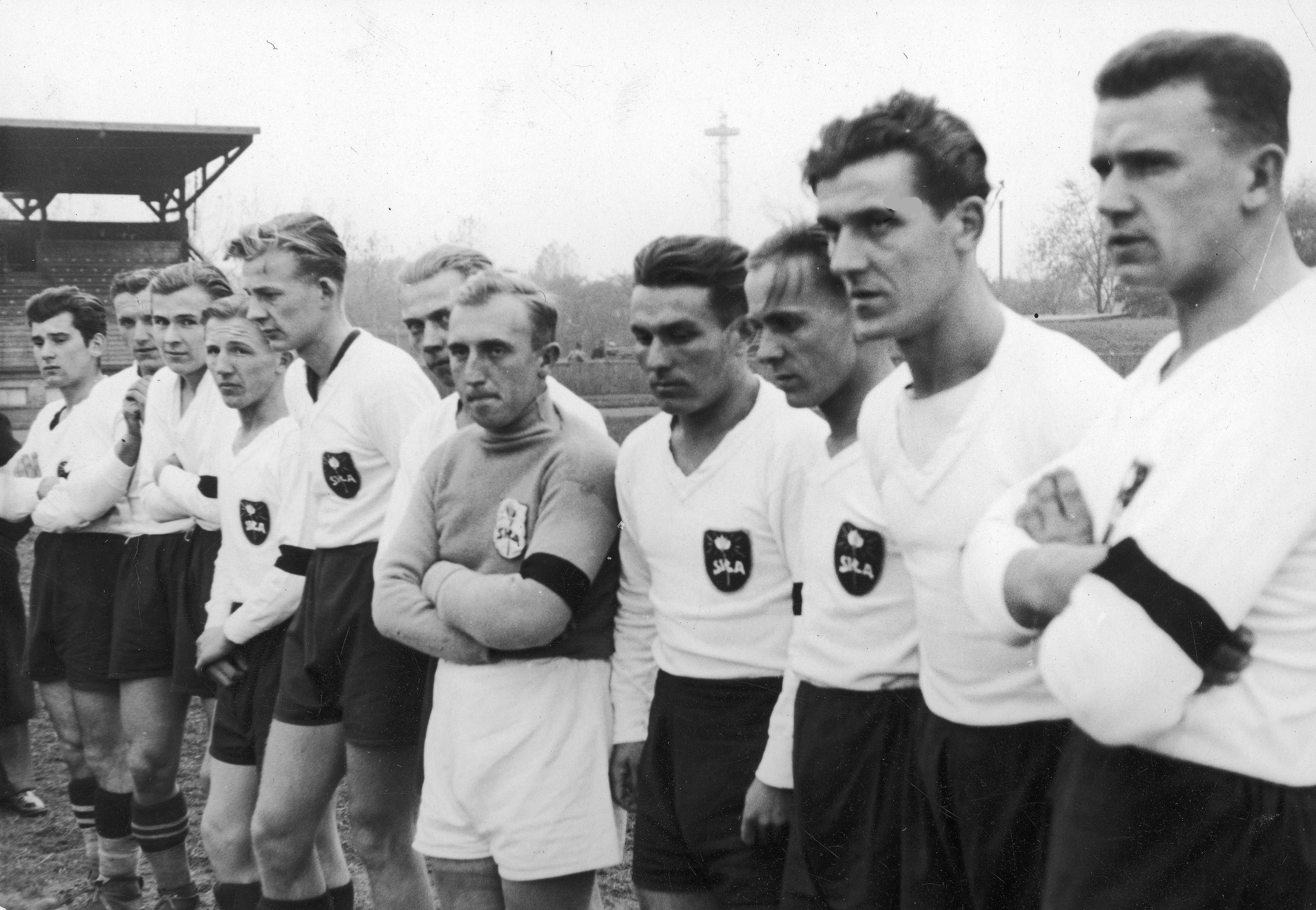
Siła Trzyniec, Katowice - 1938

In 1921 Polish population of Třinec (Polish: Trzyniec) founded KS Siła Trzyniec, ethnically Polish sport club. In the same year local German population founded DSV Trzynietz. Two years later Czechs founded their own club SK Třinec. After the communist coup d'état of 1948, communists began to curb the number of organizations in Czechoslovakia and the Polish club was fused to the Czech one in 1952. The club won promotion to the Czechoslovak First League after finishing behind Spartak Brno B, who were ineligible for promotion, in Group B of the Czechoslovak Second League in the 1962–63 season. Třinec played in the First League for the first time in the 1963–64 season, before returning to play three consecutive seasons there between 1970–71 and 1972–73. Two more seasons in the top flight followed in 1974–75 and 1975–76 before the club was relegated from the top flight.

=== Czech era ===
After the dissolution of Czechoslovakia, the club regularly took part in the Czech 2. Liga. An eight year spell there was followed by five years in the third-tier Moravian–Silesian Football League, before a return to the Second Division came in 2006. Another stint in the Second Division followed, this time lasting for six years until relegation in 2012. The club won the Moravian–Silesian Football League in the 2012–13 and 2025–26 season.

== Historic names ==
- KS Siła Trzyniec (1921–1923)
- SK Třinec (1923–1937)
- SK TŽ Třinec (1937–1950)
- Sokol Železárny Třinec (1950–1952)
- TŽ Třinec (1952–1953) (merged with KS Siła Trzyniec)
- DSO Baník Třinec (1953–1958)
- TJ TŽ Třinec (1958–1993)
- SK Železárny Třinec (1993–2000)
- FK Fotbal Třinec (2000–2022)
- FK Třinec (2022–)

== Stadium ==
Their current home ground is Stadion Rudolfa Labaje, named after former local Polish footballer, Rudolf Łabaj. The stadium has a capacity of just over 2,000. The club previously played at Lesní stadion, which is now mainly used for athletics.

== Players ==
=== Current squad ===
As of 8 September 2026.

Note: Flags indicate national team as defined under FIFA eligibility rules; some limited exceptions apply. Players may hold more than one non-FIFA nationality.

| No. | Pos. | Nation | Player |
|---|---|---|---|
| 1 | GK | CZE | Radovan Murin |
| 2 | DF | CZE | Dominik Simerský |
| 4 | DF | CZE | Matěj Helebrand |
| 7 | MF | CZE | An Khanh Andrej Nguyen |
| 9 | DF | CZE | Jakub Bolf |
| 10 | DF | CZE | Martin Samiec |
| 11 | FW | CZE | Lukáš Zdražil |
| 12 | MF | BIH | Nedžad Zinhasović |
| 13 | DF | CZE | Vojtěch Brak |
| 14 | FW | NGR | Muhammed Abdoulkarim |
| 15 | MF | CZE | Martin Vlachovský |
| 16 | MF | NGR | Chidera Jude Agbo |
| 17 | MF | CZE | Maxim Obuch |

| No. | Pos. | Nation | Player |
|---|---|---|---|
| 19 | FW | NGR | Stanley Charles |
| 20 | FW | CZE | Martin Černý (on loan from Zbrojovka Brno) |
| 21 | MF | CZE | Ondřej Machuča |
| 22 | GK | CZE | Jiří Adamuška |
| 23 | GK | CZE | Ondřej Mrózek |
| 24 | MF | CZE | Tomáš Omasta |
| 25 | FW | SVK | René Dedič |
| 26 | MF | CZE | Lukáš Ciencala |
| 27 | DF | CZE | Lukáš Dadak |
| 29 | DF | CZE | Michal Skwarczek |
| 33 | DF | BIH | Eldar Šehić |
| — | FW | SVK | Lucas Demitra |

== Managers ==
- Miroslav Kouřil (2007–08)
- Erich Cviertna (2008–09)
- Jiří Neček (2009–10)
- Zdeněk Dembinný (2010)
- Patrik Krabec (2010)
- Ľubomír Luhový (2010–12)
- Miroslav Kouřil (2012–13)
- Karel Kula (2013–14)
- Marek Kalivoda (2014–15)
- Radim Nečas (2015)
- Karel Kula (2015–16)
- Lubomír Vašek (2016)
- Jiří Neček (2016–19)
- Tomáš Jakus (2019)
- Svatopluk Habanec (2019–20)
- František Straka (2020–21)
- Martin Zbončák (2021–23)
- Roman West (2023)
- Martin Pulpit (2023)
- Tomáš Hejdušek (2024–26)
- Tomáš Jakus (2026–)

== History in domestic competitions ==
- 1981–1987 1.ČNL (tier 2)
- 1987–1991 2.ČNL (tier 3)
- 1991–1993 ČMFL (tier 2)
- 1993–2001 Czech 2. Liga
- 2001–2006 Moravian–Silesian Football League
- 2006–2012 Czech 2. Liga
- 2012–2013 Moravian–Silesian Football League
- 2013–2023 Czech 2. Liga
- 2023–2026 Moravian–Silesian Football League
- 2026– Czech 2.Liga

- Seasons spent at Level 1 of the football league system: 0
- Seasons spent at Level 2 of the football league system: 32
- Seasons spent at Level 3 of the football league system: 11
- Seasons spent at Level 4 of the football league system: 0

=== Czech Republic ===
| Season | League | Placed | Pld | W | D | L | GF | GA | GD | Pts | Cup |
|---|---|---|---|---|---|---|---|---|---|---|---|
| 1993–94 | 2. liga | 4th | 30 | 13 | 12 | 5 | 48 | 32 | +16 | 38 | Round of 32 |
| 1994–95 | 2. liga | 12th | 34 | 13 | 7 | 14 | 46 | 44 | +2 | 46 | First round |
| 1995–96 | 2. liga | 5th | 30 | 12 | 12 | 6 | 46 | 33 | +13 | 48 | Round of 64 |
| 1996–97 | 2. liga | 12th | 30 | 9 | 8 | 13 | 29 | 44 | –15 | 35 | Round of 16 |
| 1997–98 | 2. liga | 14th | 28 | 8 | 4 | 16 | 21 | 41 | –20 | 28 | Round of 64 |
| 1998–99 | 2. liga | 13th | 30 | 8 | 6 | 16 | 32 | 52 | –20 | 30 | Round of 32 |
| 1999–00 | 2. liga | 10th | 30 | 9 | 10 | 11 | 39 | 60 | –21 | 37 | First round |
| 2000–01 | 2. liga | 16th | 30 | 5 | 3 | 22 | 33 | 70 | –37 | 18 | Round of 32 |
| 2001–02 | 3. liga | 12th | 30 | 8 | 10 | 12 | 25 | 44 | -19 | 34 | First round |
| 2002–03 | 3. liga | 12th | 30 | 10 | 4 | 16 | 44 | 59 | -15 | 34 | Round of 64 |
| 2003–04 | 3. liga | 6th | 30 | 14 | 5 | 11 | 41 | 30 | +11 | 47 | First round |
| 2004–05 | 3. liga | 13th | 30 | 7 | 9 | 14 | 31 | 52 | -21 | 30 | First round |
| 2005–06 | 3. liga | 4th | 30 | 13 | 8 | 9 | 44 | 34 | +10 | 47 | Round of 64 |
| 2006–07 | 2. liga | 13th | 30 | 10 | 2 | 18 | 21 | 42 | –21 | 32 | Round of 32 |
| 2007–08 | 2. liga | 10th | 30 | 10 | 6 | 14 | 26 | 39 | –13 | 36 | Quarter-finals |
| 2008–09 | 2. liga | 9th | 30 | 9 | 12 | 9 | 31 | 29 | +2 | 39 | Round of 64 |
| 2009–10 | 2. liga | 9th | 30 | 10 | 8 | 12 | 34 | 38 | –4 | 38 | Round of 32 |
| 2010–11 | 2. liga | 5th | 30 | 12 | 8 | 10 | 32 | 34 | –2 | 44 | Round of 32 |
| 2011–12 | 2. liga | 15th | 30 | 7 | 9 | 14 | 31 | 41 | –10 | 30 | Round of 64 |
| 2012–13 | 3. liga | 1st | 30 | 22 | 2 | 6 | 80 | 27 | +53 | 68 | Round of 16 |
| 2013–14 | 2. liga | 9th | 30 | 11 | 6 | 13 | 37 | 44 | –7 | 39 | Round of 32 |
| 2014–15 | 2. liga | 13th | 30 | 8 | 6 | 16 | 33 | 51 | –18 | 30 | Quarter-finals |
| 2015–16 | 2. liga | 13th | 28 | 6 | 9 | 13 | 29 | 41 | –12 | 27 | Round of 64 |
| 2016–17 | 2. liga | 12th | 30 | 9 | 6 | 15 | 40 | 52 | –12 | 33 | Round of 64 |
| 2017–18 | 2. liga | 5th | 30 | 12 | 11 | 7 | 42 | 30 | +12 | 47 | Round of 32 |
| 2018–19 | 2. liga | 10th | 30 | 10 | 6 | 14 | 36 | 42 | -6 | 36 | Round of 32 |
| 2019–20 | 2. liga | 13th | 30 | 7 | 10 | 13 | 40 | 55 | -15 | 31 | Round of 32 |
| 2020–21 | 2. liga | 9th | 26 | 9 | 6 | 11 | 32 | 33 | -1 | 33 | Round of 32 |
| 2021–22 | 2. liga | 10th | 30 | 9 | 6 | 15 | 38 | 54 | -16 | 33 | Round of 32 |
| 2022–23 | 2. liga | 16th | 30 | 6 | 9 | 15 | 30 | 48 | -18 | 27 | Round of 32 |
| 2023–24 | 3. liga | 3rd | 34 | 17 | 8 | 9 | 69 | 45 | +24 | 59 | Round of 64 |
| 2024–25 | 3. liga | 2nd | 34 | 26 | 3 | 5 | 83 | 32 | +51 | 81 | Preliminary round |
| 2025–26 | 3. liga | 1st | 34 | 23 | 7 | 4 | 75 | 27 | +48 | 76 | Round of 32 |

== Honours ==
- Czech Republic Third Division
  - Champions: 2012–13, 2025–26
