= Roman Dobeš =

Czech footballer

Personal information
- Full name: Roman Dobeš
- Date of birth: 29 July 1978 (age 48)
- Place of birth: Zlín, Czechoslovakia
- Height: 1.73 m (5 ft 8 in)
- Position: Midfielder

Team information
- Current team: Uherský Brod (manager)

Senior career*
Years	Team	Apps	(Gls)
1997–2001	Zlín	92	(5)
2001–2002	Slovácko	9	(0)
2002–2006	Zlín	87	(4)
2006–2007	Trenčín	18	(3)
2007–2008	Dinamo Tbilisi	20	(3)
2008–2010	Bohemians Prague	48	(11)
2010–2013	Zlín	72	(13)
2013–2014	Slavia Kroměříž	-	(-)
2014	Viktoria Otrokovice	-	(-)
2014–2023	Slušovice	-	(-)

Managerial career
- 2018–2023: Zlín (youth)
- 2024: Zlín B (assistant)
- 2024: Slavia Kroměříž
- 2025–: Uherský Brod
- * Club domestic league appearances and goals

Roman Dobeš (born 29 July 1978) is a Czech former football player and current manager.
