= Stanislav Dostál =

Czech footballer (born 1991)

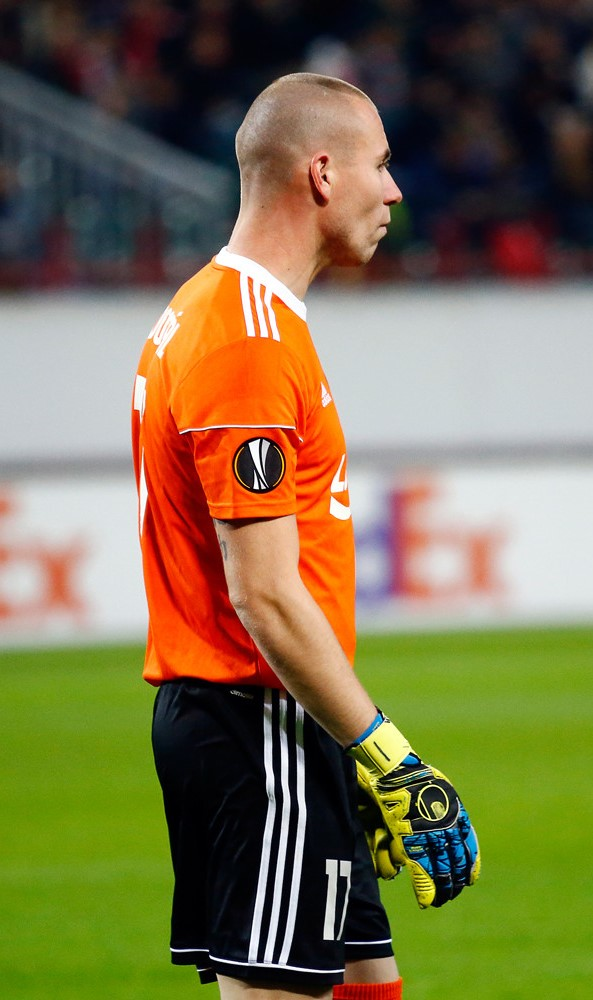

Personal information
- Date of birth: 20 June 1991 (age 35)
- Place of birth: Zlín, Czechoslovakia
- Height: 1.86 m (6 ft 1 in)
- Position: Goalkeeper

Team information
- Current team: Zlín
- Number: 17

Senior career*
Years	Team	Apps	(Gls)
2008–	Zlín	306	(0)

International career
2008–2009	Czech Republic U18	6	(0)
2010	Czech Republic U19	1	(0)
- * Club domestic league appearances and goals as of 27 May 2026

Stanislav Dostál (born 20 June 1991) is a Czech professional footballer who plays as a goalkeeper for Zlín. He plays for Zlín his entire career and is a rare example of a one-club man in the Czech football.
