= 2–0 lead is the worst lead =

Football cliché

"2–0 lead is the worst lead" (sometimes phrased as "2–0 is the most dangerous lead") is a cliché used in sporting contests to describe the situation in which one team is leading by a score of 2–0, causing them to become complacent. The phrase is most common in association football, where it is sometimes applied only to the scoreline at half-time. It is sometimes also encountered in other sports where 2–0 is a moderately large lead, such as ice hockey.

== Concept ==
The underlying concept is that, a team which is leading 2–0 will be complacent and have a 'false sense of security' in their lead. If the trailing team then scores to make it 2–1, the leading team can panic and concede further, resulting in a draw, or even a win for the other team. In contrast, a team which is leading 1–0 will tend to concentrate and play with intensity to protect or extend their narrow lead, whilst teams leading by three or more goals have a sufficiently large buffer that comebacks are unlikely.

The cliché may be invoked by coaches to encourage their players to maintain effort levels after obtaining a two-goal lead. It can also be used in broadcasting, such as by a commentator or studio pundit, to suggest that the final result is still in doubt, thereby maintaining audience interest in a game.

== Statistics ==
There is little evidence that 2–0 is the worst lead in practice. In association football, a team leading 2–0 at half-time only goes on to lose the game in about 2% of cases. A 2017 analysis by Sky Sports showed that between August 1992 and July 2017, there had been 2,766 occasions in the English Premier League where a team established two-goal lead. Of these matches, 2,481 resulted in victories for the leading team, 212 ended in draws, and 73 in defeats. In ice hockey, statistics show that if a team builds a two-goal advantage, they go on to win the game in the majority of instances, and that a one-goal lead is far more dangerous. As a result, the cliché is often used in full knowledge that 2–0 is not in fact the worst possible lead.

== Examples of usage ==
The cliché was popularized by Czech football coach and television commentator Josef Csaplár in the Czech football community. His use of the term suggested that a 2–0 half-time lead could only end in a defeat and the cliché is known in the Czech Republic as Csaplár's trap (Czech: Csaplárova past).

In Serbia, the cliché is known for being used by manager and former player Milan Živadinović.

The cliché was also used by Australian former player and TV broadcaster Johnny Warren.

In Poland, the cliché 2-0 to niebezpieczny wynik (Polish: 2-0 is a dangerous result) has been popularized by coach Czesław Michniewicz since at least 2005. In 2022, media used this cliché in connection to a game that Poland national football team, managed by Michniewicz, failed to win despite leading 2–0 against the Netherlands national football team.

Former football manager Jürgen Klopp has once stated the danger behind a 2-0 lead after Liverpool’s two-goal win against Inter Milan in the first leg of the 2021-22 UEFA Champions League, explaining that teams may become complacent which allows the opposition a chance to come back.

Television pundit and former England international footballer Gary Lineker questioned the cliché's veracity during a 2016 match between Bournemouth and Liverpool while the latter were 2–0 ahead. On that occasion, Liverpool did surrender both a 2–0 and 3–1 lead to lose 4–3.
