= Jozef Weber =

Czech footballer (born 1970)

Personal information
- Date of birth: 25 December 1970 (age 55)
- Place of birth: Bytča, Czechoslovakia
- Height: 1.79 m (5 ft 10 in)
- Position: Midfielder

Youth career
- 1980–1989: Žilina

Senior career*
Years	Team	Apps	(Gls)
1989–1991	Sparta Prague	7	(0)
1991–1994	Union Cheb	47	(1)
1994–1999	Drnovice	146	(14)
1999–2007	Jablonec	208	(10)
Total		408	(25)

Managerial career
- 2012–2014: Bohemians 1905
- 2014–2017: Karviná
- 2018–2020: Mladá Boleslav
- 2021: Karviná
- 2022: České Budějovice
- 2023: Hradec Králové
- 2025: Prostějov
- * Club domestic league appearances and goals

Jozef Weber (born 25 December 1970) is a Czech football manager and former player. His playing position was midfielder.

== Playing career ==
Weber started his professional career at MŠK Žilina before moving to Sparta Prague, where he made seven appearances in his first two seasons in the Czechoslovak First League. In the 1990–1991 season he moved to Cheb, where he continued in the Czechoslovak First League until Cheb's relegation in the 1991–92 Czechoslovak First League. Cheb returned to the top flight after a one-season absence and Weber moved to league rivals Drnovice during the 1993–94 season. Weber played in 146 games for Drnovice and scored 14 goals. He is Drnovice's leading player in terms of league appearances made.

Weber left Drnovice in 1999 and moved to Jablonec. In May 2005 he played his 350th top flight match in the Czech Republic, becoming only the 20th player to do so.

During his eight seasons in Jablonec, Weber racked up more than 200 league appearances for the club and scored 10 goals, finally hanging up his boots at the end of the 2006–07 Czech First League. In May 2007 he played his last match at the age of 36 against 1. FC Slovácko.

During his playing career, Weber played in four Czech Cup finals, but was never on the winning team.

== Managerial career ==
Weber started his non-playing career in 2007 as assistant manager in Jablonec, where he worked for more than four years.

Weber was announced as the new manager of Czech First League side Bohemians 1905 in March 2012, replacing Pavel Medynský.

Weber joined MFK Karviná in 2014. He went on to win the Czech Second League in the 2015–16 season. Although Weber guided to Karviná to safety in the 2016–17 Czech First League, he was replaced in November 2017 by the club's sport director, Lubomír Vlk.

On 10 May 2023, Weber was announced as the new manager of FC Hradec Králové, who will replace Miroslav Koubek since the end of the 2022/2023 season.

On 1 January 2025, Weber was announced as the new manager of Czech Second League club Prostějov.

== Honours ==
MFK Karviná

- Czech National Football League: 2015-16
