= Pavel Malura =

Czech football manager

Personal information
- Date of birth: 24 December 1970 (age 55)
- Place of birth: Ostrava, Czechoslovakia

Managerial career
- Years: Team
- 2004: Pogoń Szczecin
- 2005–2006: Viktoria Žižkov
- 2006–2007: Slovácko
- 2008: Hradec Králové
- 2008: Nitra
- 2011–2012: Baník Ostrava
- 2012: Karviná
- 2014: FK Dečić

Pavel Malura (born 24 December 1970) is a Czech football manager.

== Managerial career ==
Malura's management career in the Czech Republic began with FK Viktoria Žižkov, who he joined at the start of the 2005–06 season as the club was in the second-tier Czech 2. Liga. Before joining Žižkov, Malura had worked as a youth coach in Ostrava. His first Gambrinus liga managerial appointment was with 1. FC Slovácko, where he started, 13 games into the season, in 2006. In his first season, the club finished bottom of the 2006–07 Gambrinus liga and were relegated. The next season, Malura led Slovácko to first place in the first half of the season, until the winter break, but left the club in December 2007. He was subsequently appointed manager of FC Hradec Králové. Having guided Hradec to a fourth-place finish in the 2007–08 Czech 2. Liga, Malura left Hradec in the summer of 2008 in order to take up a position at Slovak club FC Nitra. His tenure at Nitra was short-lived however; after recording only three wins in the first ten rounds of the 2008–09 Slovak Superliga, Malura left by mutual consent.

He was announced as the new manager of Baník Ostrava in July 2011, following the dismissal of Karol Marko after the opening game of the 2011–12 Gambrinus liga. He had previously been in charge of Ostrava's youth team. In March 2012, with the team still in the relegation zone, Malura was replaced by Radoslav Látal. Malura had a spell at Karviná in 2012, but after a six-game winless streak he was relieved of his duties in September 2012.
