= Aleš Křeček =

Czech footballer and manager

Personal information
- Date of birth: 26 December 1971 (age 54)
- Place of birth: Czechoslovakia

Team information
- Current team: Czech Republic U-20 (Manager)

Managerial career
- Years: Team
- 2007–2008: Brno (assistant)
- 2008: Brno
- 2008–2010: Brno (assistant)
- 2010–2011: Varnsdorf
- 2011–2012: Ružomberok
- 2012: Zlín
- 2013–2014: Brno (assistant)
- 2014–2015: Slavia Praha (assistant)
- 2015: Skalica
- 2016–2017: Baník Ostrava (assistant)
- 2017–2020: Ústí nad Labem
- 2020–2021: Jihlava
- 2021–2022: České Budějovice (head of youth)
- 2022–2023: Czech Republic U-20
- 2023–2024: Czech Republic U-18
- 2024–2026: Czech Republic U-19
- 2025–: Czech Republic U-20

Aleš Křeček (born 26 December 1971) is a Czech former football player and current manager of the Czech Republic U-20.

He was appointed manager of Czech 2. Liga side Slovan Varnsdorf in August 2010. In September 2011, Křeček left his position at Varnsdorf to take over at Slovak side Ružomberok.

Křeček was named as the new manager of Zlín in May 2012. He lasted until October 2012 with the club languishing two points above the relegation zone after nine matches, when the club decided to bring back former manager Marek Kalivoda.
