= Erich Cviertna =

Czech footballer and manager (1951–2013)

Personal information
- Date of birth: 16 March 1951
- Place of birth: Nový Jičín, Czechoslovakia
- Date of death: 5 October 2013 (aged 62)
- Place of death: Ostrava, Czech Republic
- Position: Defender

Youth career
- 1959–1969: Tatra Kopřivnice

Senior career*
Years	Team	Apps	(Gls)
1971–1973	Aritma Prague		
1974–1976	Tatra Kopřivnice		
1976–1978	TJ Nový Jičín		

Managerial career
- 1979–1984: Baník Ostrava (assistant)
- 1984–1989: VP Frýdek-Místek
- 1989–1990: Sigma Olomouc
- 1990–1992: Baník Ostrava (assistant)
- 1992–1993: VP Frýdek-Místek
- 1993–1994: FC Vítkovice
- 1994–1998: VP Frýdek-Místek
- 1999–2002: Baník Ostrava (assistant)
- 2002–2003: Baník Ostrava
- 2004: FC Hlučín
- 2004–2005: Baník Ostrava (assistant)
- 2006–2007: FC Hlučín
- 2008–2009: FK Fotbal Třinec
- 2010–2011: LKS Drzewiarz Jasienica
- 2011–2013: MŠK Žilina (assistant)
- * Club domestic league appearances and goals

Erich Cviertna (16 March 1951 – 5 October 2013) was a Czech football player and manager.

As a footballer, Cviertna played for several lower league clubs. As a manager, Cviertna coached several Czech clubs, most notable of them being Gambrinus liga clubs SK Sigma Olomouc and FC Baník Ostrava. He was sacked as a manager of Baník Ostrava on 2 May 2003 for bad results of the team. Cviertna had however bad relations with the club's chairmen and was reportedly sacked for repeatedly criticizing them. Cviertna joined FK Fotbal Třinec as manager in November 2008 but didn't stay past 2009.
