= Pavel Medynský =

Czech football manager (born 1964)

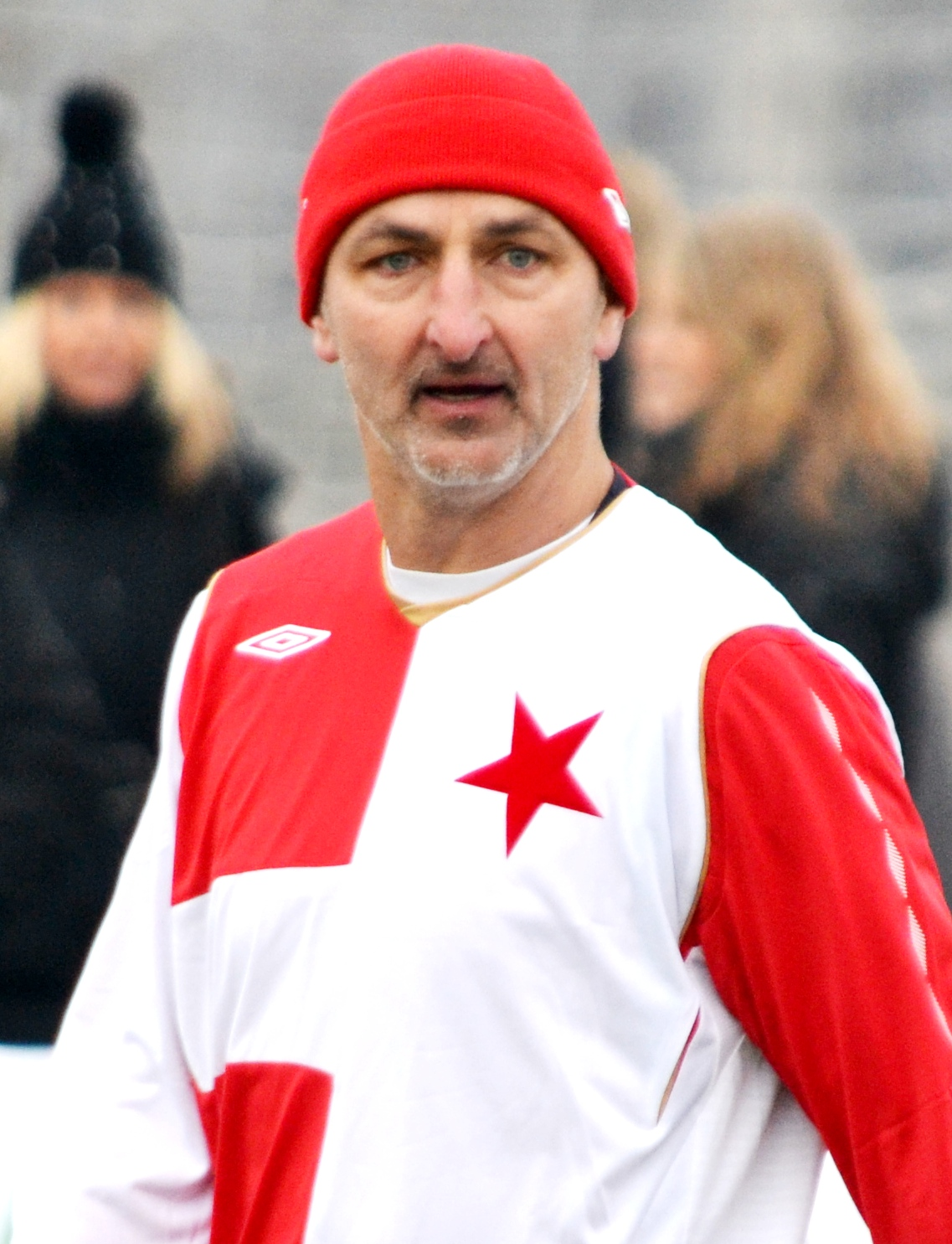
- Medynský in 2013

Personal information
- Date of birth: 28 October 1964 (age 62)
- Place of birth: Prague, Czechoslovakia
- Position: Defender

Managerial career
- Years: Team
- 2007–2008: FK Čáslav
- 2011–2012: Bohemians 1905
- 2012–?: Hradec Králové (assistant)
- 2015–2016: SK Union 2013
- 2016–2019: Slavia Prague (women)
- 2019–2021: Slovan Liberec (assistant)
- 2022–2023: Mladá Boleslav (assistant)
- 2024: Viktoria Žižkov (assistant)
- 2024–2025: Dukla Prague (assistant)
- 2026–: Arsenal Česká Lípa (assistant)

Pavel Medynský (born 28 October 1964) is a Czech football manager, who managed Bohemians 1905 in the 2011–12 Czech First League.

He joined Bohemians 1905 in 2008 as assistant coach and was promoted in May 2011, when he was announced as the new manager, replacing the outgoing Pavel Hoftych. Although Bohemians made a good start to the 2011–12 Czech First League, reaching second place, the team subsequently went on a poor run of form, scoring just four times in nine matches and the club were just five points clear of the relegation zone when Medynský was relieved of his duties in March 2012.

On 1 July 2026, Medynský was appointed as an assistant coach of Arsenal Česká Lípa.
