= FC Zlín =

Czech football club, based in Zlín

- Full name: Football Club Zlín a.s.
- Nickname: Ševci (The Cobblers)
- Founded: 1919; 107 years ago
- Ground: Letná Stadion, Zlín
- Capacity: 5,898
- Owner: Zdeněk Červenka
- Manager: Pavel Hoftych
- League: Czech First League
- 2025–26: 12th of 16
- Website: www.fczlin.com
Home colours	Away colours

FC Zlín is a professional football club from Zlín, Czech Republic. Since 2025, the club has played in the Czech First League, after winning the 2024-25 Czech National Football League.

== History ==
The club was founded in 1919 and played at the top level of Czechoslovak football between 1938 and 1947, before being disqualified from the league due to manipulation of results. The club would go on to sporadically appear four more times Czechoslovak First League before the establishment of a separate Czech League after the Velvet Divorce and the establishment of an independent Czech Republic in 1993. The club spent three years in the Czech First League before returning to the second division in 1996. After regaining promotion to the First Division in 2002, the team recorded a number of steady performances in the league, recording a 7th-place finish twice, in 2003 and 2004, and later finishing 8th in the 2007–08 season.

At the start of the 2008–09 season, the team struggled, recording just 9 points from their opening 16 matches. The club were battling relegation as the season came to a close despite a late run of good form in which they enjoyed an unbeaten run of six matches, including five wins. They needed a win in their last match of the season against Baumit Jablonec to avoid relegation, but conceded after just two minutes, trailing 5–1 at half-time and finally losing by a 6–1 scoreline, their biggest league defeat in 62 years, and dropped out of the Czech First League after seven years in the top flight. The club started the 2010–11 Czech 2. Liga with a sequence of four straight wins, and began the following season with a sequence of six matches undefeated in the 2011–12 Czech 2. Liga, although they did not manage to sustain their form on either occasion, finishing 11th and 10th respectively. The club marked the start of the 2012–13 Czech 2. Liga by changing their name, manager and captain, bringing in Aleš Křeček to manage the team, installing Tomáš Polách as club captain and signing a five-year naming deal with Czech real estate firm Fastav, replacing the former sponsorship deal with Czech kitchenware manufacturers Tescoma, renaming the club to FC Fastav Zlín. They would eventually get promoted back into the First League after coming third in the 2014–15 Czech 2. Liga.

On May 17, 2017, Zlín won the Czech Cup with a 1-0 victory over SFC Opava in the final, securing the club's biggest honor to date and subsequently qualifying them for the group stage of the 2017–18 UEFA Europa League.

The club marked the start of the 2022–23 Czech First League by changing their name, signing a three-year deal with Czech banking firm Trinity Bank, renaming the club to FC Trinity Zlín. However, after only one season, Trinity Bank left. Since July 1st, 2023, the club has been named FC Zlín.

== Historical names ==
- 1919 – SK Zlín (Sportovní klub Zlín)
- 1922 – SK Baťa Zlín (Sportovní klub Baťa Zlín)
- 1948 – SK Botostroj I. Zlín (Sportovní klub Botostroj I. Zlín)
- 1958 – TJ Gottwaldov (Tělovýchovná jednota Gottwaldov) – merger of Spartak and Jiskra
- 1989 – SK Zlín (Sportovní klub Zlín)
- 1990 – FC Svit Zlín (Football Club Svit Zlín, a.s.)
- 1996 – FC Zlín (Football Club Zlín, a.s.)
- 1997 – FK Svit Zlín (Fotbalový klub Svit Zlín, a.s.)
- 2001 – FK Zlín (Fotbalový klub Zlín, a.s.)
- 2002 – FC Tescoma Zlín (Football Club Tescoma Zlín, a.s.)
- 2012 – FC Fastav Zlín (Football Club Fastav Zlín, a.s.)
- 2022 – FC Trinity Zlín (Football Club Trinity Zlín, a.s.)
- 2023 – FC Zlín (Football Club Zlín, a.s.)

== Players ==
=== Current squad ===
As of 2 October 2026.

Note: Flags indicate national team as defined under FIFA eligibility rules; some limited exceptions apply. Players may hold more than one non-FIFA nationality.

No.	Pos.	Nation	Player
4	MF	CZE	Tom Ulbrich
5	MF	LAT	Kristers Penkevics
6	MF	CMR	Joss Didiba
8	MF	CZE	David Machalík
9	FW	CZE	Daniel Šmiga
10	MF	CZE	Stanislav Petruta (on loan from Baník Ostrava)
11	MF	SVK	Adam Gaži
14	FW	NGR	Stanley Kanu
15	DF	CRO	Zvonimir Katalinić
16	MF	NGR	Prince Emmanuel
17	GK	CZE	Stanislav Dostál
19	MF	GHA	Cletus Nombil
20	MF	GHA	Frank Appiah
22	DF	CZE	Michal Fukala
23	DF	CZE	Miloš Kopečný

No.	Pos.	Nation	Player
24	DF	CZE	Jakub Černín
25	DF	CZE	Jakub Jugas
26	MF	CZE	Michal Cupák
27	MF	CZE	Miloš Kratochvíl
28	DF	CZE	Jakub Kolář
31	DF	CZE	Lukáš Bartošák
34	GK	CZE	Milan Knobloch
35	DF	CZE	Ondřej Kukučka (on loan from Sparta Prague)
39	DF	CZE	Antonín Křapka
45	DF	COD	Prince Mukuba
53	MF	CZE	Tomáš Hellebrand
64	GK	CZE	Štěpán Bachůrek
82	MF	SVK	Marián Pišoja
88	FW	CZE	Tomáš Poznar

=== Out on loan ===
Note: Flags indicate national team as defined under FIFA eligibility rules; some limited exceptions apply. Players may hold more than one non-FIFA nationality.

No.	Pos.	Nation	Player
—	FW	CZE	Lukáš Bránecký (at Opava)

== Reserves ==
As of 2025–26, the club's reserve team FC Zlín B plays in the Moravian-Silesian Football League (3rd tier of Czech football system).

== Player records in the Czech First League ==
As of 18 September 2026.

Highlighted players are in the current squad.

=== Most appearances ===
#	Name	Matches
1	(Czech Republic) Stanislav Dostál	214
2	(Czech Republic) Jaroslav Švach	180
3	(Czech Republic) Tomáš Poznar	170
4	(Slovakia) Róbert Matejov	167
4	(Czech Republic) Antonín Fantiš	167
6	(Czech Republic) Zdeněk Kroča	162
7	(Serbia) Vukadin Vukadinović	154
8	(Czech Republic) Lukáš Bartošák	151
9	(Czech Republic) Tomáš Janíček	144
10	(Czech Republic) Jakub Janetzký	140

=== Most goals ===
#	Name	Goals
1	(Czech Republic) Tomáš Poznar	48
2	(Serbia) Vukadin Vukadinović	19
3	(Czech Republic) Igor Klejch	16
3	(Czech Republic) Jaroslav Švach	16
5	(France) Jean-David Beauguel	14
6	(Czech Republic) Edvard Lasota	13
7	(Czech Republic) Václav Činčala	12
7	(Czech Republic) Lukáš Železník	12
7	(Czech Republic) Jakub Janetzký	12
10	(Czech Republic) Josef Mucha	11
10	(Czech Republic) Martin Bača	11
10	(Czech Republic) Jakub Černín	11

=== Most clean sheets ===
#	Name	Clean sheets
1	(Czech Republic) Stanislav Dostál	47
2	(Czech Republic) Vít Baránek	36
3	(Czech Republic) František Ondrůšek	22

== Managers ==
- Petr Uličný (1990–94)
- Jozef Adamec (1994–95)
- Igor Štefanko (1995)
- Verner Lička (1995–96)
- Igor Štefanko (1996–98)
- František Mikulička (1998–99)
- Antonín Juran (1999)
- Lubomír Jegla (1999–00)
- Bohumil Páník (2000–01)
- František Komňacký (2001–02)
- Vlastislav Mareček (2002–04)
- Vlastimil Palička (2004)
- Pavel Hapal (2004–05)
- Lubomír Blaha (2005–06)
- Petr Uličný (2006)
- Pavel Hoftych (2006–08)
- Josef Mazura (2008)
- Ladislav Minář (2008)
- Stanislav Levý (2008)
- Ladislav Minář (2008–10)
- Marek Kalivoda (2010–11)
- Alois Skácel (2011–12)
- Aleš Křeček (2012)
- Marek Kalivoda (2012–13)
- Alois Skácel (2013)
- Martin Pulpit (2013–14)
- Bohumil Páník (2014–18)
- Vlastimil Petržela (2018)
- Michal Bílek (2018–19)
- Roman Pivarník (2019)
- Jan Kameník (2019)
- Josef Csaplár (2019)
- Jan Kameník (2019–20)
- Bohumil Páník (2020–21)
- Jan Jelínek (2021–22)
- Pavel Vrba (2022–23)
- Bronislav Červenka (2023–26)
- Pavel Hoftych (2026– )

== History in domestic competitions ==
- 1993–1996: Czech First League
- 1996–2002: Czech 2. Liga
- 2002–2009: Czech First League
- 2009–2015: Czech National Football League
- 2015–2024: Czech First League
- 2024–2025: Czech National Football League
- 2025–present: Czech First League

- Seasons spent at Level 1 of the football league system: 19
- Seasons spent at Level 2 of the football league system: 12
- Seasons spent at Level 3 of the football league system: 0
- Seasons spent at Level 4 of the football league system: 0

=== Czech Republic ===
Season	League	Placed	Pld	W	D	L	GF	GA	GD	Pts	Cup
1993–94	1. liga	11th	30	10	7	13	37	48	–11	37	Round of 16
1994–95	1. liga	14th	30	8	6	16	21	40	–19	30	Round of 16
1995–96	1. liga	15th	30	6	9	15	17	38	–21	27	Round of 32
1996–97	2. liga	3rd	30	12	12	6	55	33	+22	48	First round
1997–98	2. liga	5th	28	10	13	5	42	27	+15	43	Round of 32
1998–99	2. liga	8th	30	10	6	14	26	33	–7	36	Round of 32
1999–00	2. liga	8th	30	10	11	9	34	33	+11	41	Round of 16
2000–01	2. liga	5th	30	13	10	7	40	23	+17	49	Round of 64
2001–02	2. liga	2nd	30	18	10	2	56	24	+32	64	Round of 16
2002–03	1. liga	7th	30	11	9	10	34	41	–7	42	Semi-finals
2003–04	1. liga	7th	30	12	5	13	31	39	–8	41	Round of 16
2004–05	1. liga	10th	30	7	12	11	29	35	–6	33	Round of 16
2005–06	1. liga	11th	30	8	11	11	27	33	–6	35	Round of 32
2006–07	1. liga	13th	30	5	12	13	21	34	–13	27	Semi-finals
2007–08	1. liga	8th	30	10	8	12	28	31	–3	38	Round of 64
2008–09	1. liga	15th	30	7	8	15	26	49	–23	29	Quarter-finals
2009–10	2. liga	3rd	30	17	5	8	49	33	+16	56	Round of 32
2010–11	2. liga	11th	30	11	5	14	46	45	+1	38	First round
2011–12	2. liga	10th	30	9	9	12	28	36	–8	36	First round
2012–13	2. liga	6th	30	14	6	10	49	37	+12	48	Round of 32
2013–14	2. liga	11th	30	10	7	13	33	30	+3	37	Round of 32
2014–15	2. liga	3rd	30	16	7	7	53	32	+21	55	Round of 32
2015–16	1. liga	13th	30	7	9	14	34	50	–16	30	Round of 16
2016–17	1. liga	6th	30	11	8	11	34	35	–1	41	Winners
2017–18	1. liga	10th	30	8	9	13	31	48	–17	33	Semi-finals
2018–19	1. liga	8th	34	14	3	17	38	47	–9	45	Round of 16
2019–20	1. liga	13th	33	9	6	18	30	52	–22	33	Round of 16
2020–21	1. liga	14th	34	8	8	18	30	50	–20	32	Round of 64
2021–22	1. liga	12th	35	9	9	17	43	60	–17	36	Round of 16
2022–23	1. liga	15th	35	7	13	15	43	60	–17	34	Round of 16
2023–24	1. liga	16th	35	5	12	18	40	69	–29	27	Semi-finals
2024–25	2. liga	1st	30	21	8	1	45	14	+31	71	Round of 16
2025–26	1. liga	12th	35	11	8	16	43	56	–13	41	Round of 16

== European record ==
Season	Competition	Round	Club	Home	Away	Aggregate
1970–71	European Cup Winners' Cup	QR	(Republic of Ireland) Bohemians	2–2	2–1	4–3
1970–71	European Cup Winners' Cup	1R	(Netherlands) PSV Eindhoven	2–1	0–1	2–2(a)
2004	UEFA Intertoto Cup	1R	(Finland) MyPa	3–2	1–1	4–3
2004	UEFA Intertoto Cup	2R	(Belgium) Westerlo	3–0	0–0	3–0
2004	UEFA Intertoto Cup	3R	(Spain) Atlético Madrid	2–4	2–0	4–4 (a)
2005	UEFA Intertoto Cup	1R	(Belarus) Neman Grodno	0–0	1–0	1–0
2005	UEFA Intertoto Cup	2R	(Belgium) Gent	0–0	0–1	0–1
2017–18	UEFA Europa League	Group F	(Denmark) Copenhagen	1–1	0–3	4th
2017–18	UEFA Europa League	Group F	(Moldova) Sheriff Tiraspol	0–0	0–1	4th
2017–18	UEFA Europa League	Group F	(Russia) Lokomotiv Moscow	0–2	0–3	4th

== Honours ==
- Czechoslovak Cup/Czech Cup
  - Winners: 1969–70, 2016–17
- Czech-Slovak Supercup
  - Winners: 2017
- Czech National Football League
  - Winners: 2024–25

== Club records ==
=== Czech First League records ===
- Best position: 6th (2016–17)
- Worst position: 16th (2023–24)
- Biggest home win: Zlín 5–0 Sigma Olomouc (2025–26)
- Biggest away win: Slovácko 0–4 Zlín (2018–19)
- Biggest home defeat: Zlín 1–7 Viktoria Plzeň (2023–24)
- Biggest away defeat: Slavia 7–1 Zlín (2007–08)
