= Josef Csaplár =

Czech footballer and manager

Personal information
- Date of birth: 29 October 1962 (age 64)
- Place of birth: Ostrov nad Ohří, Czechoslovakia
- Position: Midfielder

Youth career
- 1973–1979: Spartak Příbram

Senior career*
Years	Team	Apps	(Gls)
1979–1985	UD Příbram		
1985–1986	Sklo Union Teplice		
1986–1987	VTJ Tábor		
1987	VTJ Karlovy Vary		
1987–1988	Sklo Union Teplice		
1988–1989	SK Rakovník		
1989–1992	UD Příbram		
1992–1996	TSV Waldkirchen		

Managerial career
- 1989–1996: UD Příbram (youth)
- 1996–1998: Dukla Příbram/FC Dukla B
- 1998: Dukla Příbram
- 2000–2001: Marila Příbram
- 2001–2003: Slovan Liberec
- 2004–2005: Slavia Prague
- 2005: Panionios
- 2005–2007: Wisła Płock
- 2008: Viktoria Žižkov
- 2009–2010: Wisła Kraków (scout)
- 2010–2012: Czech Republic U17
- 2012–2013: Czech Republic U19
- 2014–2015: Slovan Liberec
- 2015–2017: Al-Ittihad Kalba
- 2017–2019: Příbram
- 2019: Zlín
- 2024–2025: Arsenal Česká Lípa (sporting director)
- 2024–2025: Arsenal Česká Lípa
- * Club domestic league appearances and goals

Josef Csaplár (born 29 October 1962) is a Czech professional football manager and former player. He was most recently the head coach of Arsenal Česká Lípa.

== Playing career ==
Born in Ostrov nad Ohří, Csaplár began playing football at the age of 12 at Spartak Příbram.

In 1979 he moved to UD Příbram, joining the first team straight away. In the 1985/86 season he played for Sklo Union Teplice, then completed his military service in VTJ Tábor and VTJ Karlovy Vary. Following that, he returned back to Teplice, staying there for another season, after which he moved to SK Rakovník. He finished his career at German lower-league club TSV Waldkirchen.

== Managerial career ==
During his playing days, Csaplár already worked as a youth coach at UD Příbram. In 1996, he took over the club's B-team. In 1998, he was made head coach of the first team in the Czech First League, but was dismissed in November after amassing only six points from his twelve games in charge. He stayed at the club as an assistant manager.

In 2001, he managed Slovan Liberec together with Ladislav Škorpil, with the joint managers leading Liberec to the league title. In the 2003–04 winter break, he moved to manage Slavia Prague. Third in the table at the time of his appointment, Slavia finished the season in fourth place. Csaplár was eventually sacked in April 2005, leaving the team in a disappointing fourth place again.

For the 2005–06 season, Csaplár signed a two-year contract with Panionios, but was dismissed after only three months. His next club was Wisła Płock in the Polish Ekstraklasa, where he won the 2005–06 Polish Cup, the club's biggest achievement to date.

In 2008, Csaplár worked with Everton as a scout.

In September 2008, he became the manager of Czech first division side Viktoria Žižkov, replacing Stanislav Griga, but in November he was sacked after just 55 days in the job, with the club at the bottom of the league table.

In 2011, he was head coach of the Czech Republic U17 team, which qualified for the 2011 FIFA U-17 World Cup for the first time in its history.

In December 2014, after six years, Csaplár returned to Czech first division scene, when he was together with Jiří Kotrba appointed as a coach of Slovan Liberec. After only three games, in which the club lost three times with a total score of 2–8, were both coaches dismissed from their positions.

Outside of his coaching career Csaplár works as a television commentator and expert. He has popularized terms such as "Csaplár's trap", "festival of easy losses" or "heavy poor quality" in the Czech football community.

== Honours ==
=== Managerial ===
Slovan Liberec

- Czech First League: 2001–02

Wisła Płock

- Polish Cup: 2005–06
- Polish Super Cup: 2006

1.FK Příbram

- Czech National Football League runner-up: 2017–18
