= Martin Poustka =

Czech football manager

Personal information
- Date of birth: 2 December 1975 (age 50)
- Place of birth: Prague, Czechoslovakia

Senior career*
Years	Team	Apps	(Gls)
1982–2002	Motorlet Prague		

Managerial career
- 2012: Slavia Prague
- 2015–2024: Motorlet Prague
- * Club domestic league appearances and goals

Martin Poustka (born 2 December 1975) is a Czech football manager, who works for Slavia Prague.

Poustka was announced as the caretaker manager of Czech First League side Slavia Prague in March 2012, following the resignation of František Straka, who he had previously served under as assistant manager. At the age of 36, he became the fourth-youngest Slavia manager in history. Poustka was appointed until a permanent appointment could be made. However, after Vítězslav Lavička refused an offer to take over, Poustka's spell continued.
