= Marek Kalivoda =

Czech former football player (born 1974)

Personal information
- Date of birth: 2 August 1974 (age 52)
- Place of birth: Czechoslovakia
- Position: Goalkeeper

Managerial career
- Years: Team
- 2010–2011: Zlín
- 2012: Karviná
- 2012–2013: Zlín
- 2013–2014: Třinec (youth)
- 2014–2015: Třinec
- 2015–2021: Zlín (youth)
- 2021–2022: Zlín (assistant)
- 2022–: Zlín (youth)

Marek Kalivoda (born 2 August 1974) is a Czech former football player who has also worked as a football manager. He is currently the manager of FK Fotbal Třinec in the Czech National Football League.

Having previously served as the team's coach for the youth team, Kalivoda was appointed as the manager of Zlín, replacing Ladislav Minář in the summer of 2010. Having spent seven years with Zlín, Kalivoda left the club upon the expiry of his contract in 2011. He took over at Karviná in March 2012. In October 2012 he returned to Zlin.
