= Giancarlo Favarin =

Italian football manager (born 1958)

Personal information
- Date of birth: 28 August 1958 (age 68)
- Place of birth: Pisa, Italy

Managerial career
- Years: Team
- 1998–2001: Castelnuovo
- 2001–2002: Carrarese
- 2002–2003: Fano
- 2003–2004: Olbia
- 2004–2005: Latina
- 2006: Ternana
- 2007: Scafatese
- 2008: Scafatese
- 2008–2010: Lucchese
- 2012: Venezia
- 2012: Matera
- 2013: Viktoria Žižkov
- 2013–2014: Bisceglie
- 2014–2015: Fidelis Andria
- 2014: Pisa
- 2015–2016: Venezia
- 2016–2017: Fidelis Andria
- 2017–2018: Gavorrano
- 2018–2019: Lucchese
- 2019: Fidelis Andria
- 2020–2021: Gavorrano
- 2021–2022: Prato
- 2023: Tau Calcio Altopascio
- 2023–2024: Livorno

Giancarlo Favarin (born 28 August 1958) is an Italian football manager and former player.

== Early life ==
Favarin retired from professional football at the age of twenty-seven.

== Career ==
Favarin managed Italian side Lucchese, helping the club achieve promotion.

== Management style ==
Favarin has been described as a "pragmatic trainer, ready to change formation if needed - even if he favors the three-man defense -, a tough and courageous guy".

== Personal life ==
Favarin received media attention for head-butting an opposing assistant manager during a game in Italy.
