= Stanislav Levý =

Czech footballer and manager (born 1958)

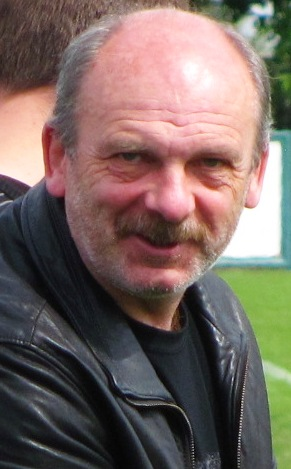
- Stanislav Levý in 2011

Personal information
- Full name: Stanislav Levý
- Date of birth: 2 May 1958 (age 68)
- Place of birth: Prague, Czechoslovakia
- Height: 1.80 m (5 ft 11 in)
- Position: Defender

Team information
- Current team: 1. FC Slovácko (manager)

Youth career
- 1964–1974: SK Úžice
- 1974–1977: Meteor Praha

Senior career*
Years	Team	Apps	(Gls)
1977–1978	RH Volary		
1978–1979	Cheb		
1979–1988	Bohemians	201	(18)
1988–1992	Blau-Weiß 90 Berlin	125	(7)
1993–1994	Tennis Borussia Berlin	20	(3)

International career
1983–1988	Czechoslovakia	25	(0)

Managerial career
- 1998–1999: Tennis Borussia Berlin
- 2001: Hannover 96
- 2003: 1. FC Saarbrücken
- 2004–2005: Viktoria Žižkov
- 2005–2006: 1. FC Slovácko
- 2006–2008: Viktoria Plzeň
- 2009–2011: Tescoma Zlín
- 2011–2012: Skënderbeu Korçë
- 2012–2014: Śląsk Wrocław
- 2015: Flamurtari Vlorë
- 2016–2017: 1. FC Slovácko
- * Club domestic league appearances and goals

Stanislav Levý (born 2 May 1958) is a Czech football manager and former player, whose playing position was defender.

During his club career, Levý played for Bohemians 1905, SpVgg Blau-Weiß 1890 Berlin and Tennis Borussia Berlin. He also made 25 appearances for the Czechoslovakia national team.

== Honours ==
=== Player ===
TJ Bohemians Praha

- Czechoslovak First League 1982–83

=== Manager ===
KF Skënderbeu Korçë

- Albanian Superliga: 2011–12
