= FK Viktoria Žižkov =

Football club in Prague, Czech Republic

Viktoria Žižkov
- Full name: FK Viktoria Žižkov
- Nickname: Viktorka
- Founded: 1903
- Ground: FK Viktoria Stadion, Prague
- Capacity: 5,037
- Manager: Radek Kronďák
- League: Czech National Football League
- 2025–26: 8th of 16
- Website: www.fkvz.cz
Home colours	Away colours

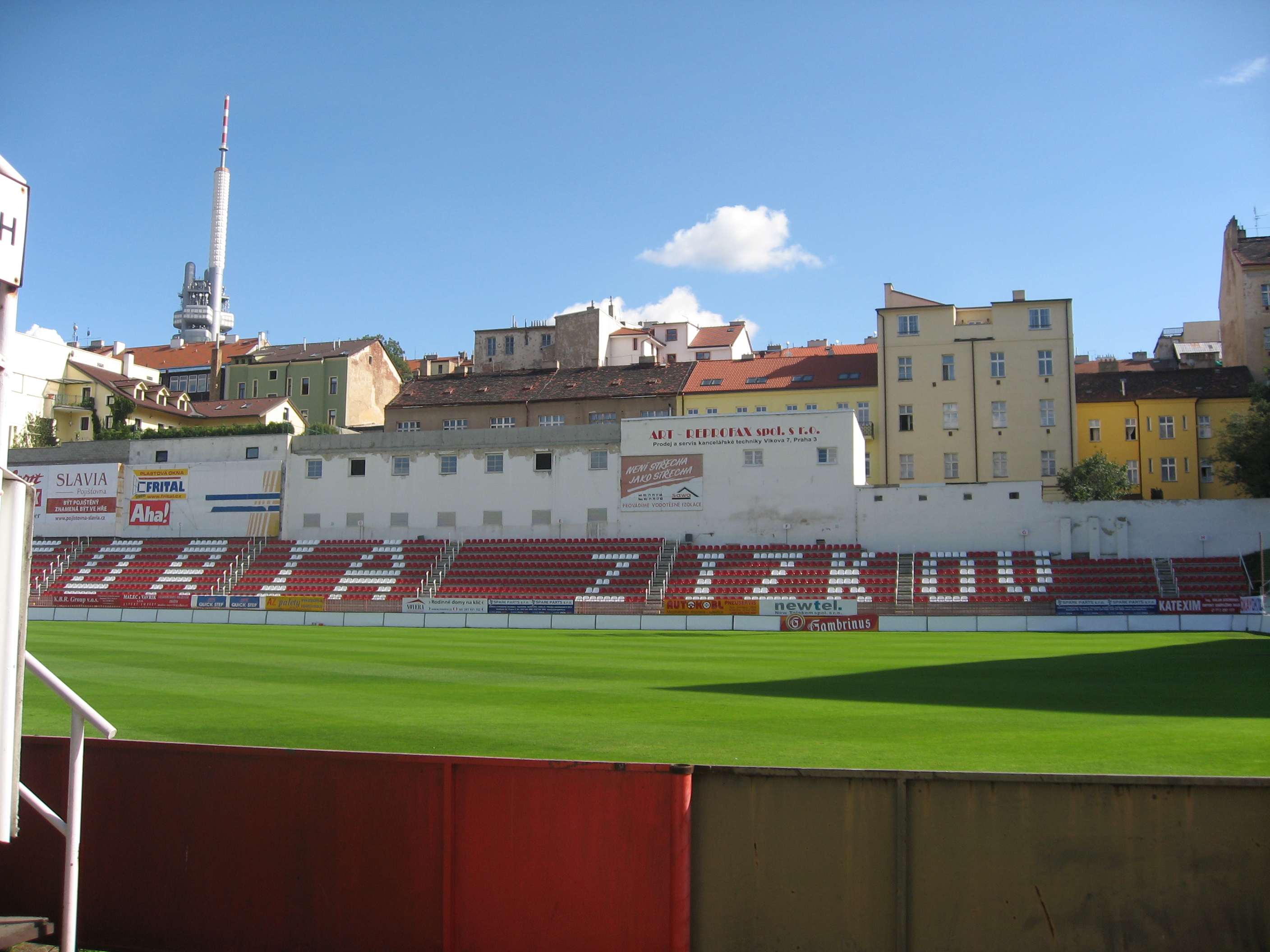
Viktoria Stadion

FK Viktoria Žižkov is a Czech professional football club from the district of Žižkov in Prague. The club competes in the Czech National Football League, the second tier of football in the country. It won the Czechoslovak First League title in the 1927–28 season, and has also won two editions of the Czech Cup.

== History ==
=== Early years ===
The team was founded by students in 1903 in the town of Žižkov (since 1922 part of Prague). At that time the students chose red and white striped shirts as their colours in honour of the colours of the Flag of Bohemia. Those same colours remain today. Viktoria's main successes fall into the period between the world wars — until 1948 it was the third most successful Czechoslovak club, winning the Czechoslovak championship in 1928 and finishing as runners-up in 1929. It won the Czechoslovak Cup in 1913, 1914, 1916, 1921, 1929, 1933, and 1940, and came runners-up in 1919 and 1920. Its successes gained international recognition, even as a result, giving the name to the Polish club Victoria Jaworzno.

=== Post-war era ===
After World War II and the beginning of communism in 1948 the club descended to the lower leagues and they didn't rejoin the top flight until 1993. In the 1950s the club underwent several name changes as a result of which the club briefly lost its historic name Viktoria; Sokol (1950), Sokol ČSAD (1951) and after a merger with Avia Čakovice the club was called TJ Slavoj Žižkov, a name which lasted until 1965 when the historic name was restored.

=== 1990s and 2000s ===
In 1993 Viktoria was promoted again to the highest league as a result of the Velvet Divorce and the Slovak clubs walking away to form their own league. Viktoria was very successful between 1993 and 2003, competing in four European cups. Žižkov won the national knock-out cup in 1994 and finished as runners-up in 1995.

In 2001 Viktoria Žižkov won their ninth cup in history followed by knocking Scottish team Rangers out of the UEFA Cup in 2002, going through on the away goals rule after extra time at Ibrox. The team finished third in the league on two more occasions, in 2002 and 2003.

In 2004, after a string of poor results and a corruption scandal, the team was relegated again to the second league. In 2007 the team successfully made it back to the Czech First League, finishing the season as runaway champions of the 2nd league. After finishing mid-table in their first season back in the top flight, in 2009 they were relegated back to the second league after struggling all season, with one of the only highlights being Petr Švancara winning Czech Television's goal of 2008 (gol roku), with his stunning individual effort to open the scoring in Žižkov's 4–2 home victory against FK Bohemians Prague (Střížkov).

Žižkov bounced back to the top flight after finishing runners-up to FK Dukla Prague in 2011. Their season started with just seven points from the opening 14 rounds of the 2011–12 Czech First League, resulting in the club parting company with coach Martin Pulpit on 23 November. In January, with the club bottom of the league, it was revealed that only ten players from the first half of the season were still at the club. A particular loss was goalkeeper Tomáš Vaclík moving to Sparta Prague. Žižkov finished bottom of the league with 19 points, and were relegated to the second division.

== Historical names ==
- 1903 – Sportovní kroužek Viktoria Žižkov
- 1904 – SK Viktoria Žižkov
- 1950 – Sokol Viktoria Žižkov
- 1951 – Sokol ČSAD Žižkov
- 1952 – TJ Slavoj Žižkov (after merger with Avia Čakovice)
- 1965 – TJ Viktoria Žižkov
- 1973 – TJ Viktoria Žižkov Strojimport
- 1982 – TJ Viktoria Žižkov PSO
- 1992 – FK Viktoria Žižkov

== Stadium ==
The club's original stadium was located in the Ohrada region, but this was closed down in 1928. Viktoria's present ground, FK Viktoria Stadion, was opened in 1952 and is situated on Seifertova třída, just a short walk (one tram stop) from Prague's main railway station. It has a capacity of 5,037. In 2007 the club opened a fanshop at the ground for the sale of club mementos.

== Players ==
=== Current squad ===
As of 14 September 2026.

Note: Flags indicate national team as defined under FIFA eligibility rules; some limited exceptions apply. Players may hold more than one non-FIFA nationality.

No.	Pos.	Nation	Player
1	GK	CZE	Mathias Škodoň
2	DF	CZE	Marek Richter
3	MF	CZE	Matěj Žitný (on loan from Dukla Prague)
4	DF	CZE	Dominik Farka
6	MF	CZE	Robert Hrubý
7	MF	CZE	Rudolf Reiter
8	MF	CZE	Milan Jirásek
9	DF	CZE	Petr Mareš
10	FW	GER	Maximilian Baafi
12	MF	CZE	Václav Prošek
13	FW	GAM	Ousman Kujabi
14	MF	CZE	Jakub Vlček (on loan from Mladá Boleslav)
15	MF	CZE	Michael Hönig
16	DF	CZE	Daniel Holásek

No.	Pos.	Nation	Player
17	MF	CZE	Denis Kaulfus (on loan from Mladá Boleslav)
18	MF	ECU	Augusto Batioja
19	MF	GAM	Mustapha Badjie
20	DF	CZE	Michal Hubínek
21	DF	FRA	Adel Kadi
22	DF	CZE	David Klusák
24	DF	CZE	Josef Divíšek
26	MF	CZE	Filip Papoušek
27	GK	CZE	Jan Sirotník
28	FW	CZE	David Huf
29	DF	CZE	Filip Novotný
33	DF	CZE	Daniel Kosek (on loan from Pardubice)
35	MF	CZE	Tomáš Polyák (on loan from Táborsko)

=== Out on loan ===
Note: Flags indicate national team as defined under FIFA eligibility rules; some limited exceptions apply. Players may hold more than one non-FIFA nationality.

No.	Pos.	Nation	Player
—	FW	CZE	Adam Toula (at Táborsko)

== In popular culture ==
The very popular 1931 Czech comedy film Muži v offsidu is centered largely on the culture and fans of Viktoria Žižkov and features unique footage of several matches from that time. The book, on which the film is based, was written by Karel Poláček.

The Czech film actor Vlasta Burian played as the regular goalkeeper for Žižkov around 1916 before setting out on his acting career. A plaque in FK Viktoria Stadion now commemorates his appearances for the club.

== Managers ==
- Vladimír Táborský (1993)
- Jiří Kotrba (1993–95)
- František Kopač (1995–96)
- Jaroslav Hřebík (1996)
- Július Bielik (1997–98)
- Jiří Štol (1998–99)
- Petr Uličný (1999)
- Zdeněk Ščasný (1999–02)
- Vítězslav Lavička (July 2002 – Sept 2003)
- Günter Bittengel (Nov 2003 – June 2004)
- Stanislav Levý (July 2004 – Dec 2004)
- František Kopač (2005)
- Pavel Malura (2005–06)
- Stanislav Griga (July 2007 – Sept 2008)
- Josef Csaplár (Sept 2008 – Nov 2008)
- Zdeněk Ščasný (Nov 2008 – Dec 2010)
- Vlastimil Petržela (June 2009 – May 2010)
- Martin Pulpit (July 2010 – Nov 2011)
- Roman Nádvorník (Dec 2011 – Mar 2013)
- Giancarlo Favarin (Mar 2013 – June 2013)
- Jindřich Trpišovský (July 2013 – May 2015)
- Roman Veselý (July 2015 – Sept 2015)
- Zdeněk Hašek (Oct 2015 – Nov 2016)
- David Vavruška (Dec 2016 – Oct 2017)
- Bohuslav Pilný (Oct 2017 – May 2018)
- Petr Mikolanda (Jun 2018 – Oct 2018)
- Miloš Sazima (Oct 2018 – May 2019)
- Zdeněk Hašek (May 2019 – Nov 2020)
- David Vavruška (Nov 2020 – Dec 2020)
- David Oulehla (Dec 2020 – Oct 2021)
- Martin Pulpit (Oct 2021 – Apr 2022)
- Daniel Veselý (Apr 2022 – May 2022)
- Michal Šmarda (May 2022 – Feb 2023)
- Michal Horňák (Feb 2023 – Dec 2023)
- Marek Nikl (Jan 2024 – May 2025)
- Jindřich Tichai (June 2025 – August 2026)
- Radek Kronďák (August 2026 – present)

== History in domestic competitions ==
- 1981–1989 2.ČNL (tier 3)
- 1989–1991 Divize (tier 4)
- 1991–1992 Bohemian Football League
- 1992–1993 ČMFL (tier 2)
- 1993–2004 Czech First League
- 2004–2007 Czech 2. Liga
- 2007–2009 Czech First League
- 2009–2011 Czech 2. Liga
- 2011–2012 Czech First League
- 2012–2015 Czech 2. Liga / Czech National Football League
- 2015–2016 Bohemian Football League
- 2016–2022 Czech National Football League
- 2022–2023 Bohemian Football League
- 2023– Czech National Football League

- Seasons spent at Level 1 of the football league system: 14
- Seasons spent at Level 2 of the football league system: 15
- Seasons spent at Level 3 of the football league system: 10
- Seasons spent at Level 4 of the football league system: 2

=== Czech Republic ===
Season	League	Placed	Pld	W	D	L	GF	GA	GD	Pts	Cup
1993–94	1. liga	8th	30	12	9	9	40	28	+12	33	Winners
1994–95	1. liga	5th	30	15	4	11	61	38	+23	49	Runners-up
1995–96	1. liga	10th	30	9	10	11	38	43	-5	37	Round of 32
1996–97	1. liga	12th	30	6	11	13	17	33	-16	29	Round of 16
1997–98	1. liga	8th	30	11	6	13	26	34	-8	39	Round of 16
1998–99	1. liga	10th	30	11	5	14	31	47	-16	38	Round of 64
1999–00	1. liga	9th	30	9	10	11	37	41	-4	37	Quarter-finals
2000–01	1. liga	5th	30	12	10	8	45	40	+5	46	Winners
2001–02	1. liga	3rd	30	19	6	5	42	20	+22	63	Round of 16
2002–03	1. liga	3rd	30	14	8	8	38	33	+5	50	Quarter-finals
2003–04	1. liga	15th	30	6	9	15	18	34	-16	27	Round of 32
2004–05	2. liga	6th	28	14	4	10	42	36	+6	46 (Note: Excluding the 12 point deduction.)	Round of 64
2005–06	2. liga	5th	30	12	10	8	42	33	+9	46	Quarter-finals
2006–07	2. liga	1st	30	19	7	4	55	23	+32	64	Round of 16
2007–08	1. liga	10th	30	10	7	13	35	48	-13	37	Quarter-finals
2008–09	1. liga	16th	30	5	7	18	27	45	-18	22	Round of 64
2009–10	2. liga	5th	30	13	7	10	42	41	+1	46	Round of 32
2010–11	2. liga	2nd	30	16	7	7	44	31	+13	55	Round of 16
2011–12	1. liga	16th	30	5	4	21	23	55	-32	19	Round of 16
2012–13	2. liga	8th	30	12	9	9	38	30	+8	45	Round of 32
2013–14	2. liga	5th	30	14	5	11	39	30	+9	47	Round of 16
2014–15	2. liga	4th	30	16	7	7	50	23	+27	55	Round of 16
2015–16	3. liga	3rd	36	24	6	6	87	32	+55	79	First round
2016–17	2. liga	9th	30	10	9	11	49	41	+8	39 (Note: Excluding the 3 point deduction.)	Round of 64
2017–18	2. liga	12th	30	10	5	15	42	52	-10	35	Round of 32
2018–19	2. liga	14th	30	7	6	17	33	59	-26	27	Round of 32
2019–20	2. liga	5th	30	15	4	11	45	40	+5	49	Round of 16
2020–21	2. liga	4th	26	13	3	10	42	38	+4	42	Round of 32
2021–22	2. liga	16th	30	3	9	18	20	43	−23	18	Round of 64
2022–23	3. liga	1st	30	22	6	2	66	19	+47	72	Round of 64
2023–24	2. liga	8th	30	11	6	13	44	51	−7	39	Round of 32
2024–25	2. liga	9th	30	11	6	13	51	49	+2	39	Round of 32
2025–26	2. liga	8th	30	12	5	13	38	52	−14	41	First round

== History in European competitions ==
=== UEFA Cup ===
Season	Round	Country	Club	Score	Goals
1994–95	Qualifying Round	(Sweden)	IFK Norrköping	4–3 (1–0, 3–3)	Poborský, Trval, Kordule, Vrabec (pen.)
	1st round	(England)	Chelsea F.C.	2–4 (2–4, 0–0)	Majoroš
2001–02	1st round	(Austria)	FC Tirol Innsbruck	0–1 (0–0, 0–1)
2002–03	Qualifying Round	(San Marino)	SP Domagnano	5–0 (2–0, 3–0)	Sabou, Stracený, Chihuri, Janoušek, Krutý
	1st round	(Scotland)	Rangers F.C.	3–3 (2–0, 1–3 A)	Pikl, Stracený, Marcel Lička
	2nd round	(Spain)	Real Betis	0–4 (0–1, 0–3)
2003–04	Qualifying Round	(Kazakhstan)	Zhenis Astana	6–1 (3–0, 3–1)	Dirnbach, Chihuri, Mikolanda, Pikl, Oravec
	1st round	(Denmark)	Brøndby IF	0–2 (0–1, 0–1)

=== Mitropa Cup ===
In 1928 Žižkov took part in the Mitropa Cup, reaching the semi-final stage, where they lost in a play off to SK Rapid Wien after the initial two-legs between the teams produced a tie. At the quarter-final stage Žižkov knocked out Građanski Zagreb (later to become Dinamo Zagreb) over two legs, winning the home tie 6–1.

== Honours ==
- Czechoslovak First League
  - Champions: 1927–28
- Czech Cup
  - Champions: 1993–94, 2000–01
- Czech 2. Liga (second tier)
  - Champions: 2006–07
- Bohemian Football League (third tier)
  - Champions: 2022–23
