= Josef Mazura =

Czech football player and manager (born 1956)

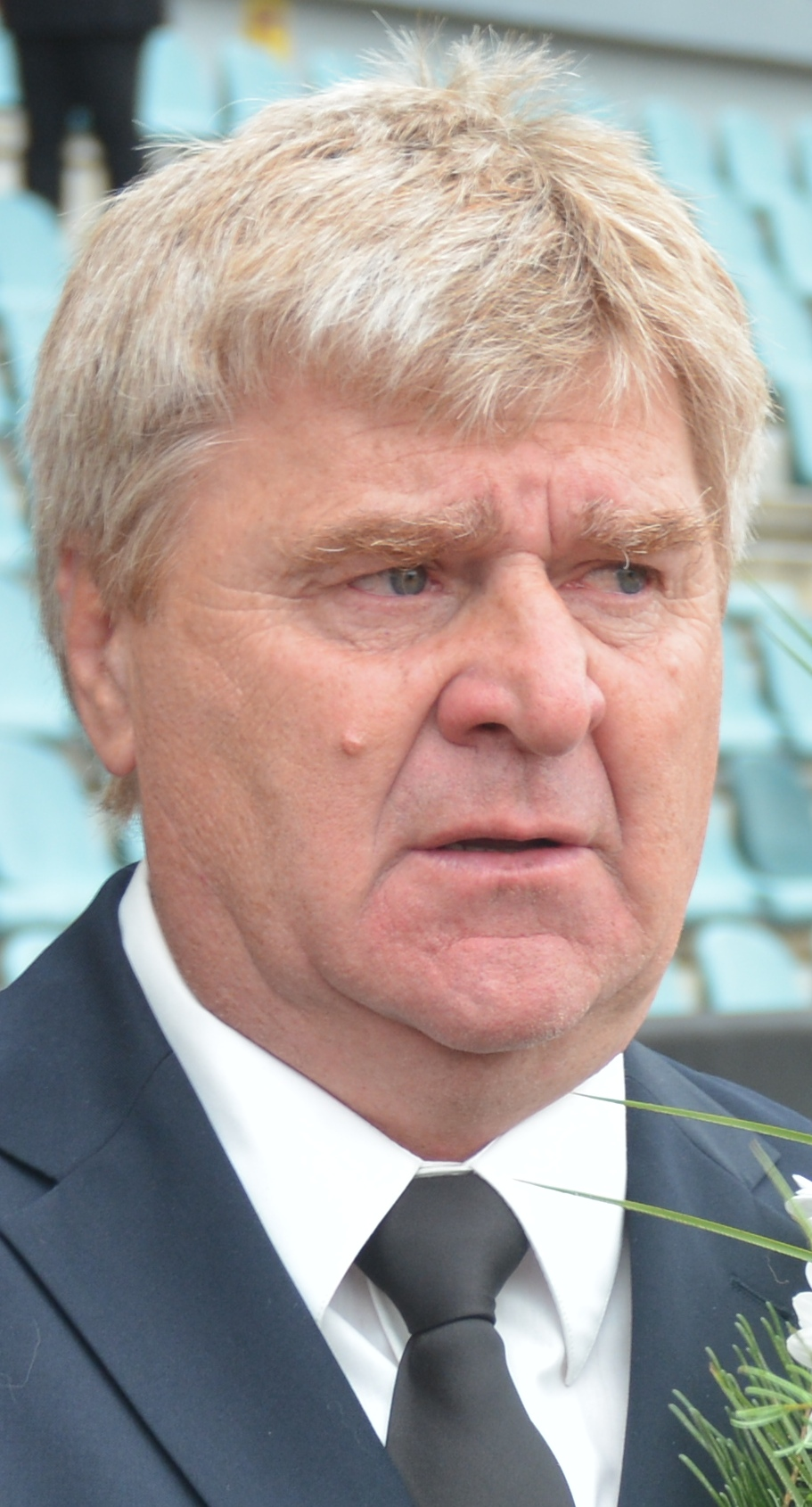

Personal information
- Full name: Josef Mazura
- Date of birth: 23 April 1956 (age 70)
- Place of birth: Vyškov, Czechoslovakia
- Position: Defender

Youth career
- 1964–1973: Sokol Lysovice
- 1973–1977: Brno

Senior career*
Years	Team	Apps	(Gls)
1977–1986	Brno		
1986–1987	St. Pölten		
1987–1988	KSC Hasselt		
1988–1998	SV Stockerau		

International career
1981	Czechoslovakia	1	(0)

Managerial career
- 1998–1999: TJ Rousínov
- 2003–2005: Drnovice
- 2005–2007: Brno
- 2007–2008: Spartak Trnava
- 2008: Zlín
- 2008–2010: Slovácko
- 2010–2012: Opava
- 2013–2014: Karviná
- 2014–2016: Líšeň
- 2020–2023: Vyškov (assistant)
- 2023–2024: Prostějov
- 2024–2025: Líšeň B
- * Club domestic league appearances and goals

Olympic medal record

Representing Czechoslovakia

Men's Football
Gold medal – first place	1980 Moscow	Team competition

Josef Mazura (born 23 April 1956) is a Czech retired football player and currently manager. He played for Czechoslovakia.

As active player, Mazura spent most of his career with FC Zbrojovka Brno. At the end of career he also played for St. Pölten, Hasselt, and Stockerau.

He was a participant at the 1980 Olympic Games, where the Czechoslovak team won the gold medal.

After retiring, he became a coach. He led Petra Drnovice, 1. FC Brno, FC Spartak Trnava and 1. FC Slovácko. He managed SFC Opava, with whom he won Moravian–Silesian Football League in 2010–11 season.
