= Martin Pulpit =

Czech football manager and former player (born 1967)

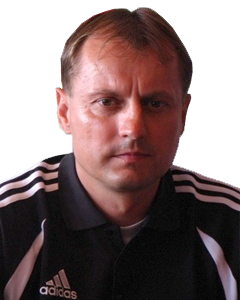

Personal information
- Date of birth: 29 January 1967 (age 59)
- Place of birth: Prague, Czechoslovakia

Managerial career
- Years: Team
- 2000–2002: Pardubice
- 2002–2004: Mladá Boleslav
- 2004: Hradec Králové
- 2004–2005: Viktoria Plzeň
- 2006: FK AS Pardubice
- 2006–2007: Baník Sokolov
- 2007–2008: Sigma Olomouc
- 2009–2010: Baník Most
- 2010–2011: Viktoria Žižkov
- 2012–2013: Baník Ostrava
- 2016: Příbram
- 2016: Vítkovice
- 2019: MFK Frýdek-Místek
- 2020: SK Rakovník
- 2021: FK Blansko
- 2021–2022: Viktoria Žižkov
- 2022: Vysoké Mýto
- 2023: Baník Sokolov
- 2023: Třinec
- 2025: Slovan Velvary

Martin Pulpit (born 29 January 1967) is a Czech football manager and former player.

He was announced as the new manager of Viktoria Žižkov in June 2010, replacing Vlastimil Petržela. Pulpit guided Žižkov to the Czech First League via a second-place finish in the 2010–11 Czech 2. Liga, but fourteen games into the 2011–12 Czech First League, he was sacked with the club having scored just seven points at that stage. He took over at Příbram in May 2016, replacing outgoing manager Pavel Tobiáš.
