= Petr Uličný =

Czech football player and manager (1950–2026)

Personal information
- Date of birth: 11 February 1950
- Place of birth: Uničov, Czechoslovakia
- Date of death: 12 June 2026 (aged 76)
- Position: Midfielder

Youth career
- 1958–1969: HS Kroměříž

Senior career*
Years	Team	Apps	(Gls)
1969–1972	Sparta Prague		
1972–1977	Škoda Plzeň		
1977–1983	Sigma Olomouc		

Managerial career
- 1984–1985: US Uničov
- 1985–1987: Sigma Olomouc B
- 1986–1989: Sigma Olomouc (assistant)
- 1989–1990: Baník Havířov
- 1990–1994: Svit Zlín
- 1994–1996: Boby Brno
- 1996–1997: Baník Ostrava
- 1997–1999: Viktoria Plzeň
- 1999: Viktoria Žižkov
- 2000: SFC Opava
- 2000–2003: SK Hradec Králové
- 2003–2006: Sigma Olomouc
- 2006: Tescoma Zlín
- 2007: MFK Ružomberok
- 2007–2008: 1. FC Brno
- 2009–2010: 1. HFK Olomouc
- 2011–2012: SK Sigma Olomouc
- * Club domestic league appearances and goals

Petr Uličný (11 February 1950 – 12 June 2026) was a Czech football player and manager.

Having previously managed Sigma Olomouc until 2006, guiding the club to finishes of third, fourth and ninth, Uličný returned in December 2011.

Uličný died on 12 June 2026, at the age of 76.

== Honours ==
=== Manager ===
Sigma Olomouc

- Czech Cup: 2011–12
