= 2011–12 FC Slovan Liberec season =

Slovan Liberec
2011–12 season
- Manager: Jaroslav Šilhavý
- Stadium: Stadion u Nisy
- Czech First League: 1st
- Czech Cup: Quarter-finals
- Top goalscorer: League: Jiří Štajner (15); All: Michal Breznaník (16)
- Average home league attendance: 5,787
- Biggest win: 4–0 v Varnsdorf (Away, 10 August 2011, Czech Cup); 4–0 v Dynamo České Budějovice (Home, 5 November 2011, Czech First League); 4–0 v Viktoria Žižkov (Home, 20 April 2012, Czech First League); 4–0 v Dynamo České Budějovice (Away, 28 April 2012, Czech First League)
- Biggest defeat: 0–2 v Teplice (Home, 27 August 2011, Czech First League); 0–2 v Teplice (Home, 28 March 2012, Czech Cup); 1–3 v Sparta Prague (Home, 7 April 2012, Czech First League)

The 2011–12 season was Football Club Slovan Liberec's 19th consecutive season in the Czech First League. In addition to the domestic league, Slovan Liberec participated in that season's editions of the Czech Cup.

== Squad ==
Squad at end of season

Note: Flags indicate national team as defined under FIFA eligibility rules; some limited exceptions apply. Players may hold more than one non-FIFA nationality.

No.	Pos.	Nation	Player
1	GK	CZE	Zbyněk Hauzr
2	DF	CRO	Renato Kelić
3	DF	SRB	Miloš Karišik
4	MF	CZE	Erik Daniel
5	MF	CZE	Emil Rilke
6	MF	CZE	Lukáš Vácha
7	FW	CZE	Jan Nezmar
8	MF	CZE	Jiří Liška
9	FW	CZE	Jakub Vojta
10	MF	SRB	Miloš Bosančić
11	DF	SVK	Michal Breznaník
13	DF	CZE	Jan Polák
14	DF	CZE	Pavel Bína
15	FW	CZE	Vojtěch Hadaščok

No.	Pos.	Nation	Player
16	GK	CZE	Ondřej Kolář
17	DF	CZE	Tomáš Janů
19	FW	CZE	Michael Rabušic
20	MF	CMR	Nesmen Ndemen
22	MF	CZE	Jiří Krystan
23	FW	CZE	Josef Šural
24	FW	CZE	Jiří Štajner
25	MF	CZE	Jiří Fleišman
27	MF	SVK	Ján Vlasko
28	FW	CZE	Zbyněk Musiol
29	DF	CZE	Petr Zieris
30	GK	CZE	David Bičík
32	DF	CZE	Theodor Gebre Selassie

== Competitions ==
=== Overview ===
Competition	First match	Last match	Starting round	Final position	Record							
Competition	First match	Last match	Starting round	Final position	Pld	W	D	L	GF	GA	GD	Win %
Czech First League	30 July 2011	12 May 2012	Matchday 1	Winners	30	20	6	4	68	29	+39	66.67
Czech Cup	10 August 2011	28 March 2012	Second round	Quarter-finals	6	4	1	1	14	6	+8	66.67
Total					36	24	7	5	82	35	+47	66.67

Source: Competitions

=== Czech First League ===
==== League table ====
Pos	Team	Pld	W	D	L	GF	GA	GD	Pts	Qualification or relegation
1	Slovan Liberec (C)	30	20	6	4	68	29	+39	66	Qualification for Champions League second qualifying round
2	Sparta Prague	30	20	4	6	51	25	+26	64	Qualification for Europa League third qualifying round (Note: Sigma Olomouc, the 2011–12 Czech Cup winner, were initially to enter the third qualifying round of the Europa League. However, UEFA banned them from participating in Europa League over the club’s involvement in a corruption scandal. As a result, Sparta Prague, the second-placed team of the league, entered the Europa League third qualifying round instead of the second qualifying round, and Mladá Boleslav, the fourth-placed team of the league, will take one of Czech Republic's Europa League places in the second qualifying round.)
3	Viktoria Plzeň	30	19	6	5	66	33	+33	63	Qualification for Europa League second qualifying round
4	Mladá Boleslav	30	15	5	10	49	34	+15	50	Qualification for Europa League second qualifying round
5	Teplice	30	12	10	8	36	30	+6	46	

Source: Fortuna liga
Rules for classification: 1) points; 2) goal difference; 3) number of goals scored.
(C) Champions

==== Results summary ====
Overall								Home						Away					
Pld	W	D	L	GF	GA	GD	Pts	W	D	L	GF	GA	GD	W	D	L	GF	GA	GD
30	20	6	4	68	29	+39	66	8	4	3	28	15	+13	12	2	1	40	14	+26

Source: Competitions

==== Results by round ====
Round	1	2	3	4	5	6	7	8	9	10	11	12	13	14	15	16	17	18	19	20	21	22	23	24	25	26	27	28	29	30
Ground	A	H	A	A	H	A	H	A	H	A	H	A	H	A	H	A	H	H	A	H	A	H	A	H	A	H	A	H	A	H
Result	D	W	W	W	L	W	D	D	L	W	W	W	W	W	D	W	W	W	L	W	W	W	W	L	W	W	W	D	W	D
Position	7	7	2	3	5	3	2	3	4	3	4	3	2	2	2	2	2	2	2	2	2	2	1	2	1	1	1	1	1	1
Points	1	4	7	10	10	13	14	15	15	18	21	24	27	30	31	34	37	40	40	43	46	49	52	52	55	58	61	62	65	66

Source: Matches
A = Away; H = Home; W = Win; D = Draw; L = Loss

==== Matches ====
30 July 2011 1	Viktoria Plzeň	2–2	Slovan Liberec	Plzeň
17:30 CEST (UTC+2)	Rajtoral 16'; Bystroň 33'; Horváth (yellow card) 50'; Čišovský (yellow card) 72' (red card) 85'	Report	Breznaník 25'; Štajner 47'; Vácha (yellow card) 60'; Nezmar (yellow card) 90'	Stadium: Stadion města Plzně; Attendance: 3,740; Referee: Miroslav Zelinka; Assistant referees: Ivo Chytil, Ondřej Pelikán

6 August 2011 2	Slovan Liberec	2–1	Slavia Prague	Liberec
18:00 CEST (UTC+2)	Gebre Selassie 2'; Vácha (yellow card) 26'; Rabušic 38'; Nezmar (yellow card) 48'	Report	Petrák (yellow card) 56'; Pospěch 64' (pen.); Trubila (yellow card) 90'	Stadium: Stadion u Nisy; Attendance: 7,967; Referee: Jiří Adam; Assistant referees: Martin Wilczek, Drahoslav Handlíř

14 August 2011 3	Hradec Králové	0–3	Slovan Liberec	Hradec Králové
17:00 CEST (UTC+2)	Dvořák (yellow card) 64'	Report	Vácha (yellow card) 42', (goal) 66'; Breznaník 83', 85'	Stadium: Všesportovní stadion Attendance: 7,220; Referee: Libor Kovařík; Assistant referees: Antonín Kordula, Radek Kocián

20 August 2011 4	Příbram	2–3	Slovan Liberec	Příbram
16:00 CEST (UTC+2)	Ricka 45'; Wágner 70'	Report	Blažek (yellow card) 50'; Rabušic 64', 83'; Vácha 65'	Stadium: Na Litavce; Attendance: 2,938; Referee: Radek Příhoda; Assistant referees: Luděk Lhoták, Jiří Moláček

27 August 2011 5	Slovan Liberec	0–2	Teplice	Liberec
19:20 CEST (UTC+2)	Nezmar (yellow card) 51'; Blažek (yellow card) 55'	Report	Čajić (yellow card) 23'; Vachoušek (yellow card) 45'; Mahmutović 47'; Ljevaković 56'; Smejkal (yellow card) 87'	Stadium: Stadion u Nisy; Attendance: 4,750; Referee: Jan Jílek; Assistant referees: Martin Večeřa, Zdeněk Dobrovolný

10 September 2011 6	Mladá Boleslav	1–4	Slovan Liberec	Mladá Boleslav
20:24 CEST (UTC+2)	Kulič 49', (red card) 75'; Šírl (yellow card) 60'; Zahustel (yellow card) 68'	Report	Polák 19'; Šural 44'; Štajner 51', 80'; Breznaník (yellow card) 74'	Stadium: Městský stadion Attendance: 2,741; Referee: Roman Hrubeš; Assistant referees: Josef Košec, Libor Kovařík

17 September 2011 7	Slovan Liberec	1–1	Sigma Olomouc	Liberec
18:00 CEST (UTC+2)	Štajner 2'; Nezmar (red card) 15'; Vácha (yellow card) 42'	Report	Schulmeister 4'; Škerle (yellow card) 54'; Navrátil (yellow card) 71'; Varadi (yellow card) 77'; Kučera (yellow card) 84'	Stadium: Stadion u Nisy; Attendance: 4,930; Referee: Karel Hrubeš; Assistant referees: Josef Košec, Jiří Jiřík

25 September 2011 8	Bohemians 1905	1–1	Slovan Liberec	Prague (Note: The match was played at the Synot Tip Arena in Prague, instead of Bohemians 1905 regular stadium, the Ďolíček, which did not meet FAČR requirements.)
17:00 CEST (UTC+2)	Borek 17'; Cseh (yellow card) 23'; Nešpor (yellow card) 33'; Škoda (yellow card) 35'; Žižka (yellow card) 45'; Jindřišek (yellow card) 53'	Report	Rabušic 31'; Kelić (yellow card) 37'; Breznaník (yellow card) 39'; Štajner (yellow card) 60'	Stadium: Synot Tip Arena; Attendance: 2,666; Referee: Drahoslav Drábek; Assistant referees: Ivo Nádvorník, Petr Blažej

1 October 2011 9	Slovan Liberec	1–2	Dukla Prague	Liberec
18:00 CEST (UTC+2)	Rilke 13'	Report	Svatonský (yellow card) 42'; Gedeon 63'; Vrzal (yellow card) 73'; Rada (yellow card) 82'; Lietava 84'	Stadium: Stadion u Nisy; Attendance: 5,320; Referee: Petr Ardeleánu; Assistant referees: Patrik Filípek, Jiří Moláček

15 October 2011 10	Sparta Prague	0–3	Slovan Liberec	Prague
18:20 CEST (UTC+2)	Pamić (yellow card) 76'	Report	Breznaník 7', 64'; Šural 10'; Štajner (yellow card) 58'; Vácha (yellow card) 67'; Polák (yellow card) 68'	Stadium: Generali Arena; Attendance: 12,305; Referee: Pavel Královec; Assistant referees: Martin Wilczek, Antonín Kordula

21 October 2011 11	Slovan Liberec	3–2	Baník Ostrava	Liberec
20:15 CEST (UTC+2)	Hadaščok 19'; Nezmar 38', 90'	Report	Droppa (yellow card) 4'; Svěrkoš 27', 67'; Poliaček (yellow card) 33'; Pietrzkiewicz (yellow card) 38'; Vomáčka (yellow card) 81'	Stadium: Stadion u Nisy; Attendance: 3,812; Referee: Miroslav Zelinka; Assistant referees: Emanuel Marek, Pavel Peřina

29 October 2011 12	Viktoria Žižkov	1–4	Slovan Liberec	Prague
10:15 CEST (UTC+2)	Starý (yellow card) 39'; Böhm 54'; Folprecht (yellow card) 73'	Report	Breznaník 44', 82', (yellow card) 80'; Rabušic 45'; Štajner 69' (pen.)	Stadium: FK Viktoria Stadion; Attendance: 2,367; Referee: Radek Příhoda; Assistant referees: Dušan Pospíšil, Jiří Jiřík

5 November 2011 13	Slovan Liberec	4–0	Dynamo České Budějovice	Liberec
16:00 CET (UTC+1)	Breznaník 26'; Gebre Selassie 38'; Nezmar 42'; Štajner 66'	Report	Petráň (yellow card) 63'	Stadium: Stadion u Nisy; Attendance: 3,988; Referee: Tomáš Adámek; Assistant referees: Petr Slavík, Jan Paták

19 November 2011 14	Slovácko	1–2	Slovan Liberec	Uherské Hradiště
17:00 CET (UTC+1)	Pavelka (yellow card) 19'; Kordula (yellow card) 27'	Report	Rabušic 39', 90'	Stadium: Městský fotbalový stadion Miroslava Valenty; Attendance: 4,529; Referee: Radek Matějek; Assistant referees: Martin Wilczek, Ondřej Pelikán

26 November 2011 15	Slovan Liberec	2–2	Jablonec	Liberec
17:45 CET (UTC+1)	Fleišman (yellow card) 31'; Rabušic 51'; Štajner 64'	Report	Lafata 38'; Jarolím 56'	Stadium: Stadion u Nisy; Attendance: 5,926; Referee: Jaroslav Bílek; Assistant referees: Emil Ubias, Tomáš Kovařík

3 December 2011 16	Slavia Prague	1–3	Slovan Liberec	Prague
16:00 CET (UTC+1)	Trubila (yellow card) 28'; Blažek (yellow card) 38'; Milutinović (yellow card) 57'; Latka 77'	Report	Štajner 29' (pen.); Gebre Selassie 34'; Breznaník 63'; Karišik (yellow card) 83'	Stadium: Synot Tip Arena; Attendance: 4,851; Referee: Drahoslav Drábek; Assistant referees: Zdeněk Dobrovolný, Ivo Nádvorník

18 February 2012 17	Slovan Liberec	3–1	Hradec Králové	Liberec
16:00 CET (UTC+1)	Breznaník 32'; Fleišman (yellow card) 41'; Štajner 51', (yellow card) 76'; Karišik (yellow card) 54'; Gebre Selassie (yellow card) 58'; Vácha (yellow card) 85'; Bosančić 90'	Report	Pávek (yellow card) 22'; Yedunov (yellow card) 59' (red card) 72'; Hochmeister 83'	Stadium: Stadion u Nisy; Attendance: 3,897; Referee: Drahoslav Drábek; Assistant referees: Petr Vysloužil, Zdeněk Dobrovolný

25 February 2012 18	Slovan Liberec	2–0	Příbram	Liberec
18:50 CET (UTC+1)	Štajner 14', 18' (pen.)	Report	Pilík (yellow card) 16' (red card) 67'; Pleško (yellow card) 20'	Stadium: Stadion u Nisy; Attendance: 3,965; Referee: Petr Ardeleánu; Assistant referees: Jiří Moláček, Dušan Pospíšil

2 March 2012 19	Teplice	1–0	Slovan Liberec	Teplice
20:15 CET (UTC+1)	Dolejš (yellow card) 23'; Mahmutović 53'; Rosa (yellow card) 63'; Vachoušek (yellow card) 65'; Vondrášek (yellow card) 77'	Report	Bosančić (yellow card) 36'; Nezmar (yellow card) 74'; Vácha (yellow card) 81'	Stadium: Na Stínadlech; Attendance: 3,051; Referee: Pavel Královec; Assistant referees: Radek Kocián, Robert Hájek

10 March 2012 20	Slovan Liberec	2–1	Mladá Boleslav	Liberec
19:30 CET (UTC+1)	Gebre Selassie 90'; Bosančić 90'	Report	Kúdela 30', (yellow card) 90'; Šírl (yellow card) 41'; Kulič (yellow card) 66'; Šćuk (yellow card) 74'; Mareš (yellow card) 86'	Stadium: Stadion u Nisy; Attendance: 4,358; Referee: Michal Paták; Assistant referees: Jiří Jiřík, Ladislav Gallo

17 March 2012 21	Sigma Olomouc	2–4	Slovan Liberec	Olomouc
16:00 CET (UTC+1)	Ordoš 25', 61', (yellow card) 50'	Report	Rabušic (yellow card) 52', (goal) 57'; Breznaník 53'; Štajner 71'; Musiol 90'	Stadium: Andrův stadion Attendance: 6,828; Referee: Jan Jílek; Assistant referees: Tomáš Lakomý, Václav Štěrba

24 March 2012 22	Slovan Liberec	3–0	Bohemians 1905	Liberec
16:00 CET (UTC+1)	Gebre Selassie 17'; Rilke (yellow card) 25'; Rabušic (yellow card) 41'; Bosančić 53'; Nezmar 75'	Report	Lukáš (yellow card) 14'; Moravec (yellow card) 71'	Stadium: Stadion u Nisy; Attendance: 5,508; Referee: Tomáš Adámek; Assistant referees: Ivo Chytil, Petr Slavík

1 April 2012 23	Dukla Prague	1–2	Slovan Liberec	Prague
20:10 CEST (UTC+2)	Pázler (yellow card) 58'; Podrazký 85'	Report	Rilke 5', (yellow card) 70'; Fleišman (yellow card) 66'; Štajner 75'	Stadium: Stadion Juliska; Attendance: 1,683; Referee: Jiří Jech; Assistant referees: Emanuel Marek, Ivo Nádvorník

7 April 2012 24	Slovan Liberec	1–3	Sparta Prague	Liberec
19:00 CEST (UTC+2)	Nezmar (yellow card) 42'; Rilke (yellow card) 45'; Fleišman (yellow card) 65'; Šural 76'; Gebre Selassie (yellow card) 78'; Kelić (yellow card) 90'	Report	Hušbauer 32'; Brabec (yellow card) 48'; Sionko (yellow card) 63'; Krejčí 74', 80'	Stadium: Stadion u Nisy; Attendance: 10,000; Referee: Radek Příhoda; Assistant referees: Jiří Jiřík, Dušan Pospíšil

16 April 2012 25	Baník Ostrava	1–3	Slovan Liberec	Ostrava
19:00 CEST (UTC+2)	Kukec 11', (yellow card) 69'; Vašenda (yellow card) 54'; Marek (yellow card) 67'; Frydrych (yellow card) 72'; Adámik (yellow card) 78'; Vrťo (yellow card) 90'	Report	Bosančić 13'; Janů (yellow card) 16'; Rabušic 23'; Štajner 68' (pen.)	Stadium: Bazaly; Attendance: 4,387; Referee: Libor Kovařík; Assistant referees: Patrik Filípek, Kryštof Mencl

20 April 2012 26	Slovan Liberec	4–0	Viktoria Žižkov	Liberec
20:15 CEST (UTC+2)	Bosančić (yellow card) 35'; Vácha (yellow card) 71'; Breznaník (yellow card) 73'; Musiol 81'; Rabušic (yellow card) 81', (goal) 88'; Fleišman (yellow card) 89'	Report	Šťastný (yellow card) 71' (red card) 76'	Stadium: Stadion u Nisy; Attendance: 5,235; Referee: Roman Hrubeš; Assistant referees: Ivo Chytil, Milan Makovička

28 April 2012 27	Dynamo České Budějovice	0–4	Slovan Liberec	České Budějovice
16:45 CEST (UTC+2)	Řezníček (yellow card) 42'; Javorek (yellow card) 75'; Machovec (yellow card) 83'	Report	Štajner 22' (pen.); Breznaník (yellow card) 26'; Bosančić 59', 69'; Hadaščok 85'	Stadium: Stadion Střelecký ostrov Attendance: 3,337; Referee: Drahoslav Drábek; Assistant referees: Martin Wilczek, Roman Páral

4 May 2012 28	Slovan Liberec	0–0	Slovácko	Liberec
20:15 CEST (UTC+2)	Rabušic (yellow card) 20'	Report	Kubáň (yellow card) 31'; Volešák (yellow card) 38'; Ondřejka (yellow card) 48'; Kordula (yellow card) 80'; Melichárek (yellow card) 89'; Kuncl (yellow card) 90'; Reinberk (yellow card) 90'	Stadium: Stadion u Nisy; Attendance: 7,250; Referee: Jiří Adam; Assistant referees: Ivo Chytil, Ladislav Gallo

9 May 2012 29	Jablonec	0–2	Slovan Liberec	Jablonec nad Nisou
18:00 CEST (UTC+2)	Lafata (yellow card) 13'; Zábojník (yellow card) 44'; Novák (yellow card) 50'	Report	Kelić (yellow card) 45'; Hadaščok 66', 90'; Breznaník (yellow card) 71'	Stadium: Stadion Střelnice; Attendance: 6,040; Referee: Jiří Jech; Assistant referees: Michal Urban, Václav Štěrba

12 May 2012 30	Slovan Liberec	0–0	Viktoria Plzeň	Liberec
17:30 CEST (UTC+2)	Fleišman (yellow card) 61'; Breznaník (yellow card) 63'; Štajner (yellow card) 68'	Report	Darida (yellow card) 22'; Limberský (yellow card) 34'	Stadium: Stadion u Nisy; Attendance: 9,900; Referee: Pavel Královec; Assistant referees: Martin Wilczek, Josef Košec

=== Czech Cup ===
10 August 2011 Second round	Varnsdorf	0–4	Slovan Liberec	Varnsdorf
17:00 CEST (UTC+2)	Cana (yellow card) 41'; Koblizek (yellow card) 74'	Report	Šural 23'; Rabušic 27', 57', (yellow card) 66'; Nezmar 82' (pen.)	Stadium: Městský stadion v Kotlině

31 August 2011 Third round	Slovan Liberec	3–1	Hradec Králové	Liberec
18:00 CEST (UTC+2)	Hadaščok 3', 59'; Nezmar (yellow card) 36'; Štajner 51' (pen.)	Report	Plašil (yellow card) 45'; Fischer (yellow card) 59'; 90'	Stadium: Stadion u Nisy

==== Fourth round ====
21 September 2011 First leg	Převýšov	1–4	Slovan Liberec	Převýšov
16:30 CEST (UTC+2)	Svoboda 86'	Report	Breznaník 20', 39'; Rabušic 41'; Kelić 59'

26 October 2011 Second leg	Slovan Liberec	2–1 (6–2 agg.)	Převýšov	Liberec
17:30 CEST (UTC+2)	Breznaník 50', 72'	Report	Knobloch 80'	Stadium: Stadion u Nisy
Note: Slovan Liberec won 6–2 on aggregate.

==== Quarter-finals ====
21 March 2012 First leg	Teplice	1–1	Slovan Liberec	Teplice
18:00 CET (UTC+1)	Volek 72'	Report	Šural 74'	Stadium: Na Stínadlech

28 March 2012 Second leg	Slovan Liberec	0–2 (1–3 agg.)	Teplice	Liberec
15:30 CEST (UTC+2)		Report	Lukáš 14'; Jindráček 83'	Stadium: Stadion u Nisy
Note: Teplice won 3–1 on aggregate.
