= 2012–13 FC Slovan Liberec season =

Slovan Liberec
2012–13 season
- Manager: Jaroslav Šilhavý
- Stadium: Stadion u Nisy
- Czech First League: 3rd
- Czech Cup: Semi-finals
- Czech Supercup: Runners-up
- UEFA Champions League: Third qualifying round
- UEFA Europa League: Play-off round
- Top goalscorer: League: Michael Rabušic; Jiří Štajner (8 each)
- Average home league attendance: 4,238
- Biggest win: 4–0 v Příbram (Away, 28 July 2012, Czech First League)
- Biggest defeat: 0–3 v Sigma Olomouc (Away, 16 September 2012, Czech First League); 0–3 v Teplice (Away, 11 November 2012, Czech First League); 0–3 v Dukla Prague (Away, 23 November 2012, Czech First League)

The 2012–13 season was Football Club Slovan Liberec's 20th consecutive season in the Czech First League. In addition to the domestic league, Slovan Liberec participated in that season's editions of the Czech Cup, the Czech Supercup, the UEFA Champions League and the UEFA Europa League.

== Squad ==
Squad at end of season

Note: Flags indicate national team as defined under FIFA eligibility rules; some limited exceptions apply. Players may hold more than one non-FIFA nationality.

No.	Pos.	Nation	Player
1	GK	CZE	Zbyněk Hauzr
2	DF	CRO	Renato Kelić
3	DF	SRB	Miloš Karišik
4	DF	SVK	Michal Janec
5	DF	CZE	Vladimír Coufal
7	MF	CZE	Luboš Hušek
8	MF	CZE	David Pavelka
10	MF	UKR	Serhiy Rybalka
11	DF	CZE	Martin Frýdek
12	MF	GHA	Isaac Sackey
13	MF	CZE	Ondřej Kušnír
14	DF	SVK	Martin Tóth

No.	Pos.	Nation	Player
15	DF	CZE	Radoslav Kováč
16	GK	CZE	Přemysl Kovář
17	DF	CZE	Tomáš Janů
18	FW	SEN	Moustapha Ndiaye
19	FW	CZE	Michael Rabušic
22	DF	CZE	Jiří Pimpara
23	MF	CZE	Josef Šural
24	FW	CZE	Jiří Štajner
25	MF	CZE	Jiří Fleišman
28	FW	CGO	Dzon Delarge
30	GK	CZE	Daniel Bojčuk

== Competitions ==
=== Overview ===
Competition	First match	Last match	Starting round	Final position	Record							
Competition	First match	Last match	Starting round	Final position	Pld	W	D	L	GF	GA	GD	Win %
Czech First League	28 July 2012	1 June 2013	Matchday 1	3rd	30	16	6	8	46	34	+12	53.33
Czech Cup	26 September 2012	8 May 2013	Third round	Semi-finals	7	4	2	1	15	8	+7	57.14
Czech Supercup	20 July 2012		Final	Runners-up	1	0	0	1	0	2	−2	0.00
UEFA Champions League	17 July 2012	8 August 2012	Second qualifying round	Third qualifying round	4	1	1	2	3	4	−1	25.00
UEFA Europa League	23 August 2012	30 August 2012	Play-off round	Play-off round	2	0	1	1	4	6	−2	0.00
Total					44	21	10	13	68	54	+14	47.73

Source: Competitions

=== Czech First League ===
==== League table ====
Pos	Team	Pld	W	D	L	GF	GA	GD	Pts	Qualification or relegation
1	Viktoria Plzeň (C)	30	20	5	5	54	21	+33	65	Qualification for Champions League second qualifying round
2	Sparta Prague	30	19	6	5	55	23	+32	63	Qualification for Europa League second qualifying round
3	Slovan Liberec	30	16	6	8	46	34	+12	54	Qualification for Europa League second qualifying round
4	Jablonec	30	13	10	7	49	41	+8	49	Qualification for Europa League third qualifying round (Note: Jablonec won the 2012–13 Czech Cup and qualified for the third qualifying round of the UEFA Europa League.)
5	Sigma Olomouc	30	13	8	9	38	29	+9	47	

Source: Fortuna liga
Rules for classification: 1) points; 2) head-to-head points; 3) head-to-head goal difference; 4) head-to-head goals scored; 5) goal difference; 6) number of goals scored.
(C) Champions

==== Results summary ====
Overall								Home						Away					
Pld	W	D	L	GF	GA	GD	Pts	W	D	L	GF	GA	GD	W	D	L	GF	GA	GD
30	16	6	8	46	34	+12	54	10	4	1	26	12	+14	6	2	7	20	22	−2

Source: Competitions

==== Results by round ====
Round	1	2	3	4	5	6	7	8	9	10	11	12	13	14	15	16	17	18	19	20	21	22	23	24	25	26	27	28	29	30
Ground	A	H	A	H	A	H	A	H	A	A	H	A	H	A	H	A	H	A	H	A	H	A	H	H	A	H	A	H	A	H
Result	W	W	L	D	W	D	L	D	D	L	W	L	W	L	L	L	W	D	W	L	W	W	W	W	W	W	W	W	W	D
Position	1	1	4	4	3	4	6	6	8	9	7	7	5	7	9	9	7	7	7	7	7	5	5	5	5	3	3	3	3	3
Points	3	6	6	7	10	11	11	12	13	13	16	16	19	19	19	19	22	23	26	26	29	32	35	38	41	44	47	50	53	54

Source: Matches
A = Away; H = Home; W = Win; D = Draw; L = Loss

==== Matches ====
28 July 2012 1	Příbram	0–4	Slovan Liberec	Příbram
16:00 CEST (UTC+2)		Report	Štajner 41' (pen.); Hájovský 57' (o.g.); Vácha (yellow card) 57', (goal) 70'; Hadaščok (yellow card) 65'; Fleišman 77'	Stadium: Na Litavce; Attendance: 3,276; Referee: Michal Paták; Assistant referees: Jiří Jiřík, Petr Blažej

4 August 2012 2	Slovan Liberec	3–2	Dukla Prague	Liberec
18:00 CEST (UTC+2)	Breznaník (yellow card) 30'; Janů (yellow card) 36'; Šural 47', 60', 80', (yellow card) 81'; Karišik (yellow card) 51'	Report	Hašek 37'; Malý 51', (yellow card) 77' (red card) 85'; Borek (yellow card) 55'; Gedeon (yellow card) 62'; Přeučil (yellow card) 67'	Stadium: Stadion u Nisy; Attendance: 4,232; Referee: Radek Matějek; Assistant referees: Pavel Peřina, Jan Paták

11 August 2012 3	Jablonec	1–0	Slovan Liberec	Jablonec nad Nisou
18:00 CEST (UTC+2)	Novák (yellow card) 30'; Lyulka 74' (o.g.)	Report	Morozenko (yellow card) 36'; Kelić (yellow card) 90'; Lyulka (yellow card) 90'	Stadium: Stadion Střelnice; Attendance: 4,532; Referee: Pavel Franěk; Assistant referees: Josef Košec, Tomáš Kovařík

19 August 2012 4	Slovan Liberec	1–1	Vysočina Jihlava	Liberec
15:00 CEST (UTC+2)	Nezmar (yellow card) 21'; Kelić (yellow card) 58'; Fleišman (yellow card) 62'; Šural 90'	Report	Jungr 10'; Tlustý (yellow card) 32'; Kryštůfek (yellow card) 42'; Josl (yellow card) 61'; Hanuš (yellow card) 89'	Stadium: Stadion u Nisy; Attendance: 2,853; Referee: Miroslav Zelinka; Assistant referees: Dušan Pospíšil, Libor Zeman

26 August 2012 5	Dynamo České Budějovice	0–2	Slovan Liberec	České Budějovice
17:00 CEST (UTC+2)	Řepka (yellow card) 45'; Hanzlík (yellow card) 76'	Report	Šural 24'; Souza 58'	Stadium: Stadion Střelecký ostrov Attendance: 2,920; Referee: Petr Ardeleánu; Assistant referees: Kryštof Mencl, Patrik Filípek

2 September 2012 6	Slovan Liberec	0–0	Slavia Prague	Liberec
17:00 CEST (UTC+2)	Janů (yellow card) 61'; Fleišman (red card) 87'	Report	Juhar (yellow card) 54'; Vošahlík (yellow card) 64'; Mičola (yellow card) 84'; Cicman (yellow card) 90'	Stadium: Stadion u Nisy; Attendance: 4,848; Referee: Radek Příhoda; Assistant referees: Josef Košec, Tomáš Kovařík

16 September 2012 7	Sigma Olomouc	3–0	Slovan Liberec	Olomouc
17:15 CEST (UTC+2)	Pospíšil 18'; Ordoš 62'; Doležal 79'	Report	Lyulka (yellow card) 42'; Janů (yellow card) 45'; Blažek (yellow card) 64'	Stadium: Andrův stadion Attendance: 5,285; Referee: Pavel Královec; Assistant referees: Martin Wilczek, Roman Slyško

21 September 2012 8	Slovan Liberec	2–2	Baník Ostrava	Liberec
20:15 CEST (UTC+2)	Blažek 69', 83', (yellow card) 83'	Report	Kraut 20'; Fantiš 40'; Kaprálik (yellow card) 52'	Stadium: Stadion u Nisy; Attendance: 3,095; Referee: Petr Mikel; Assistant referees: Pavel Peřina, Stanislav Pochylý

30 September 2012 9	Hradec Králové	2–2	Slovan Liberec	Hradec Králové
17:00 CEST (UTC+2)	Dvořák 25'; Poděbradský (yellow card) 59'; Uškovič (yellow card) 65'; Hochmeister (red card) 65'; Šisler (yellow card) 69'; Harba 83', (yellow card) 84'	Report	Štajner 7', 66' (pen.), (yellow card) 88'; Kušnír (yellow card) 51'; Vácha (yellow card) 76'	Stadium: Všesportovní stadion Attendance: 4,231; Referee: Michal Paták; Assistant referees: Jan Paták, Emanuel Marek

7 October 2012 10	Zbrojovka Brno	2–1	Slovan Liberec	Brno
16:00 CEST (UTC+2)	Šoljić (yellow card) 27'; Zavadil 56'; Přerovský 90'	Report	Vácha (yellow card) 37' (red card) 86'; Šural (yellow card) 72'; Bosančić 77'	Stadium: Městský fotbalový stadion Srbská; Attendance: 3,001; Referee: Jan Jílek; Assistant referees: Josef Košec, Roman Tacina

22 October 2012 11	Slovan Liberec	2–0	Mladá Boleslav	Liberec
18:00 CEST (UTC+2)	Delarge 51'; Vácha 65'; Kušnír (yellow card) 67'	Report	Mareš (yellow card) 22'	Stadium: Stadion u Nisy; Attendance: 3,270; Referee: Jiří Jech; Assistant referees: Patrik Filípek, Michal Urban

28 October 2012 12	Sparta Prague	2–1	Slovan Liberec	Prague
18:00 CET (UTC+1)	Balaj (yellow card) 28'; Jarošík 32'; Švejdík 63'; Krejčí (yellow card) 68'	Report	Vácha (yellow card) 13' (red card) 90'; Blažek 74'; Bosančić (yellow card) 79'	Stadium: Generali Arena; Attendance: 7,350; Referee: Libor Kovařík; Assistant referees: Kryštof Mencl, Ivo Nádvorník

5 November 2012 13	Slovan Liberec	3–2	Slovácko	Liberec
18:00 CET (UTC+1)	Štajner 25'; Šural 26', (yellow card) 90'; Hadaščok 84'; Fleišman (yellow card) 86'	Report	Reinberk (yellow card) 17' (red card) 81'; Trousil 45'; Lukáš (yellow card) 48'; Kovář (yellow card) 60'; Došek 85'	Stadium: Stadion u Nisy; Attendance: 3,076; Referee: Michal Paták; Assistant referees: Emanuel Marek, Petr Blažej

11 November 2012 14	Teplice	3–0	Slovan Liberec	Teplice
15:00 CET (UTC+1)	Mahmutović 1', (yellow card) 61'; Lüftner 35'; Rosa (yellow card) 45'; M. Jarolím 76'; Ljevaković (yellow card) 86'	Report	Kušnír (yellow card) 50'; Bosančić (yellow card) 54'; Kelić (yellow card) 86'	Stadium: Na Stínadlech; Attendance: 3,015; Referee: Radek Příhoda; Assistant referees: Tomáš Kovařík, Dušan Pospíšil

17 November 2012 15	Slovan Liberec	1–2	Viktoria Plzeň	Liberec
18:20 CET (UTC+1)	Vácha (yellow card) 1'; Bosančić 19', (yellow card) 90'; Šural (yellow card) 38'; Blažek (yellow card) 45'; Kušnír (yellow card) 70'	Report	Limberský (yellow card) 10'; Darida (yellow card) 27', (goal) 78'; Procházka (red card) 43'; Bakoš (yellow card) 45'; Štípek 62'	Stadium: Stadion u Nisy; Attendance: 4,180; Referee: Tomáš Kocourek; Assistant referees: Kryštof Mencl, Ivo Nádvorník

23 November 2012 16	Dukla Prague	3–0	Slovan Liberec	Prague
18:00 CET (UTC+1)	Pospěch 34', 86'; Vorel 75'; Božić (yellow card) 78'; Engelmann (yellow card) 89'	Report	Bosančić (yellow card) 24'; Fleišman (yellow card) 51'	Stadium: Stadion Juliska; Attendance: 1,681; Referee: Pavel Franěk; Assistant referees: Jiří Jiřík, Jan Paták

23 February 2013 17	Slovan Liberec	1–0	Jablonec	Liberec
19:10 CET (UTC+1)	Pavelka (yellow card) 56'; Rabušic (yellow card) 59'; Štajner 65', (yellow card) 88'	Report		Stadium: Stadion u Nisy; Attendance: 3,666; Referee: Jiří Jech; Assistant referees: Josef Košec, Dušan Pospíšil; Fourth official: Karel Hrubeš

1 March 2013 18	Vysočina Jihlava	0–0	Slovan Liberec	Jihlava
18:00 CET (UTC+1)	Vaculík (yellow card) 90'; Šimonek (yellow card) 90'	Report	Kelić (yellow card) 44'; Kováč (yellow card) 55'	Stadium: Stadion v Jiráskově ulici Attendance: 2,650; Referee: Libor Kovařík; Assistant referees: Patrik Filípek, Radek Kotík; Fourth official: Radek Matějek

9 March 2013 19	Slovan Liberec	3–1	Dynamo České Budějovice	Liberec
16:00 CET (UTC+1)	Štajner (yellow card) 28'; Kušnír 31'; Rybalka 78'; Šural (yellow card) 83'; Fleišman 90'	Report	Hora 15'; Rýdel (yellow card) 59'	Stadium: Stadion u Nisy; Attendance: 3,438; Referee: Petr Ardeleánu; Assistant referees: Václav Štěrba, Pavel Vlasjuk; Fourth official: Drahoslav Drábek

16 March 2013 20	Slavia Prague	3–1	Slovan Liberec	Prague
15:40 CET (UTC+1)	Bortel (yellow card) 32'; Dobrotka 39'; Mičola (yellow card) 44'; Škutka 55'; Čonka (yellow card) 58'; Kisel 63', (yellow card) 64'; Petrák (yellow card) 89'	Report	Rabušic (yellow card) 20'; Štajner 49'; Sackey (yellow card) 58' (red card) 66'; Rybalka (yellow card) 68'; Kušnír (yellow card) 90'	Stadium: Eden Arena; Attendance: 5,999; Referee: Radek Příhoda; Assistant referees: Jiří Moláček, Jakub Hrabovský; Fourth official: Jiří Adam

29 March 2013 21	Slovan Liberec	1–0	Sigma Olomouc	Liberec
20:15 CET (UTC+1)	Delarge 86'	Report	Dreksa (yellow card) 40'	Stadium: Stadion u Nisy; Attendance: 3,964; Referee: Jiří Jech; Assistant referees: Antonín Kordula, Ondřej Pelikán; Fourth official: Tomáš Kocourek

6 April 2013 22	Baník Ostrava	0–1	Slovan Liberec	Ostrava
17:00 CEST (UTC+2)	Hable (yellow card) 47'; Droppa (yellow card) 62'	Report	Delarge 6'; Fleišman (yellow card) 37'; Pavelka (yellow card) 46'; Sackey (yellow card) 50'	Stadium: Bazaly; Attendance: 6,570; Referee: Jiří Adam; Assistant referees: Patrik Filípek, Pavel Vlasjuk; Fourth official: Zbyněk Proske

13 April 2013 23	Slovan Liberec	1–0	Hradec Králové	Liberec
16:00 CEST (UTC+2)	Rybalka 51'; Kušnír (yellow card) 57'	Report	Uškovič (yellow card) 67'; Hadaščok (yellow card) 77'	Stadium: Stadion u Nisy; Attendance: 5,116; Referee: Jan Kalenda; Assistant referees: Dušan Pospíšil, Robert Hájek; Fourth official: Libor Kovařík

20 April 2013 24	Slovan Liberec	2–0	Zbrojovka Brno	Liberec
16:00 CEST (UTC+2)	Rabušic 26', 82'; Frýdek (yellow card) 48'; Pavelka (yellow card) 55'	Report	Mezlík (yellow card) 15'; Frejlach (yellow card) 28'; Husár (yellow card) 90'	Stadium: Stadion u Nisy; Attendance: 3,653; Referee: Radek Matějek; Assistant referees: Roman Tacina, Marek Pilný; Fourth official: Karel Hrubeš

28 April 2013 25	Mladá Boleslav	2–3	Slovan Liberec	Mladá Boleslav
18:05 CEST (UTC+2)	Zahustel (yellow card) 42'; Bořil (yellow card) 50'; Kelić 56' (o.g.); Dosoudil (yellow card) 68'; Sivrić 89'; D. Jarolím (yellow card) 90'	Report	Sackey (yellow card) 20'; Delarge (yellow card) 28'; Kováč (yellow card) 33'; Rabušic 45', 70'; Kušnír (yellow card) 90'; Štajner 90'	Stadium: Městský stadion Attendance: 3,541; Referee: Martin Nenadál; Assistant referees: Tomáš Kovařík, Jakub Hrabovský; Fourth official: Karel Hrubeš

4 May 2013 26	Slovan Liberec	2–0	Sparta Prague	Liberec
16:35 CEST (UTC+2)	Rabušic 8'; Rybalka (yellow card) 41'; Pavelka (yellow card) 43'; Delarge (yellow card) 52'; Štajner 66'; Kováč (yellow card) 73'; Kušnír (yellow card) 90'	Report	Hybš (yellow card) 53'; Jarošík (yellow card) 60'; Bednář (yellow card) 76'; Vidlička (yellow card) 85'	Stadium: Stadion u Nisy; Attendance: 9,215; Referee: Miroslav Zelinka; Assistant referees: Antonín Kordula, Jiří Jiřík; Fourth official: Jiří Jech

11 May 2013 27	Slovácko	0–3	Slovan Liberec	Uherské Hradiště
19:00 CEST (UTC+2)	Kubáň (yellow card) 60'	Report	Pavelka 32', (yellow card) 53'; Rabušic 59'; Delarge 81'	Stadium: Městský fotbalový stadion Miroslava Valenty; Attendance: 4,103; Referee: Pavel Královec; Assistant referees: Václav Štěrba, Dušan Pospíšil; Fourth official: Petr Mikel

21 May 2013 28	Slovan Liberec	3–1	Teplice	Liberec
20:15 CEST (UTC+2)	Kelić 28'; Pavelka 67'; Rabušic 81'	Report	Litsingi (yellow card) 59'; Mahmutović (yellow card) 67'; Podaný 74'	Stadium: Stadion u Nisy; Attendance: 4,514; Referee: Petr Ardeleánu; Assistant referees: Patrik Filípek, Petr Vysloužil; Fourth official: Ondřej Lerch

26 May 2013 29	Viktoria Plzeň	1–2	Slovan Liberec	Plzeň
18:00 CEST (UTC+2)	Štípek 82', (yellow card) 85'; Darida (yellow card) 90'	Report	Rabušic 17'; Rybalka (yellow card) 25'; Šural (yellow card) 65'; Delarge (yellow card) 67'; Hušek 90'	Stadium: Doosan Arena; Attendance: 11,315; Referee: Jiří Jech; Assistant referees: Tomáš Kovařík, Petr Blažej; Fourth official: Miroslav Zelinka

1 June 2013 30	Slovan Liberec	1–1	Příbram	Liberec
17:00 CEST (UTC+2)	Šural 57'	Report	Wágner 10' (pen.); Azíz (yellow card) 65' (red card) 67'	Stadium: Stadion u Nisy; Attendance: 4,444; Referee: Radek Matějek; Assistant referees: Ladislav Gallo, Martin Černý; Fourth official: Tomáš Kocourek

=== Czech Cup ===
26 September 2012 Third round	Arsenal Česká Lípa	0–0 (2–4 p)	Slovan Liberec	Česká Lípa
16:30 CEST (UTC+2)	Broschinský (yellow card) 67'; Gibala (yellow card) 77'	Report	Blažek (yellow card) 64'; Hadaščok (yellow card) 80'	Stadium: Městský stadion u Ploučnice
	Penalties
	Broschinský (penalty scored); Kankovsky (penalty scored)		(penalty scored) Štajner; (penalty scored) Bosančić; (penalty scored) Blažek; (penalty scored) Vácha
Note: Slovan Liberec won 4–2 on penalties.

==== Fourth round ====
17 October 2012 First leg	Rosice	1–4	Slovan Liberec	Rosice
16:00 CEST (UTC+2)	Micko 27'	Report	Šural 2', 64'; Rabušic 9', 12'	Stadium: Stadion FC Slovan Rosice

31 October 2012 Second leg	Slovan Liberec	3–0 (7–1 agg.)	Rosice	Liberec
17:00 CET (UTC+1)	Blažek 21'; Štajner 77'; Šural 88'	Report		Stadium: Stadion u Nisy
Note: Slovan Liberec won 7–1 on aggregate.

==== Quarter-finals ====
3 April 2013 First leg	Slovan Liberec	2–0	Teplice	Liberec
18:00 CEST (UTC+2)	Rabušic 24'; Delarge 31'	Report	Janič (yellow card) 21'; Jablonský (yellow card) 49'; Čajić (yellow card) 84'	Stadium: Stadion u Nisy

16 April 2013 Second leg	Teplice	2–2 (2–4 agg.)	Slovan Liberec	Teplice
17:30 CEST (UTC+2)	Chovanec 5'; Vůch 71'	Report	Fleišman (yellow card) 7'; Delarge 38', (yellow card) 68'; Pavelka 79'	Stadium: Na Stínadlech
Note: Slovan Liberec won 4–2 on aggregate.

==== Semi-finals ====
24 April 2013 First leg	Slovan Liberec	4–3	Jablonec	Liberec
18:30 CEST (UTC+2)	Štajner 37' (pen.), 38', 59'; Rabušic (yellow card) 41'; Delarge 63'	Report	Vaněk 11', 58'; Loučka (yellow card) 61'; Třešňák 67', (yellow card) 79'; Beneš (yellow card) 69'	Stadium: Stadion u Nisy

8 May 2013 Second leg	Jablonec	2–0 (5–4 agg.)	Slovan Liberec	Jablonec nad Nisou
17:15 CEST (UTC+2)	Loučka (yellow card) 20'; Hubník 52'; Piták 63', (yellow card) 76'; Kopic (yellow card) 86'	Report	Kušnír (yellow card) 18'; Delarge (yellow card) 22'; Štajner (yellow card) 25'; Frýdek (yellow card) 66'; Kováč (yellow card) 71'	Stadium: Stadion Střelnice
Note: Jablonec won 5–4 on aggregate.

=== Czech Supercup ===
20 July 2012 Final	Slovan Liberec	0–2	Sigma Olomouc	Liberec
17:30 CEST (UTC+2)	Fleišman (yellow card) 26'; Butenin (yellow card) 38'; Kušnír (yellow card) 55'	Report	Doležal 24'; Ordoš 27' (pen.); Škerle (yellow card) 29'; Hořava (yellow card) 31'	Stadium: Stadion u Nisy; Attendance: 2,870

=== UEFA Champions League ===
==== Qualifying rounds ====
===== Second qualifying round =====
17 July 2012 First leg	Slovan Liberec (Czech Republic)	1–0	(Kazakhstan) Shakhter Karagandy	Liberec, Czech Republic
19:00 CEST (UTC+2)	Hadaščok 23'; Vácha (yellow card) 65'; Bosančić (yellow card) 88'	Report	Bayzhanov (yellow card) 8'; Vasiljević (yellow card) 40'; Đidić (yellow card) 60'	Stadium: Stadion u Nisy; Attendance: 5,500; Referee: Aleksei Eskov (Russia); Assistant referees: Tikhon Kalugin (Russia), Vyacheslav Semenov (Russia); Fourth official: Sergey Lapochkin (Russia)

24 July 2012 Second leg	Shakhter Karagandy (Kazakhstan)	1–1 (a.e.t.) (1–2 agg.)	(Czech Republic) Slovan Liberec	Karagandy, Kazakhstan
19:00 EKT (UTC+6)	Kukeyev 40' (pen.), (yellow card) 51'; Vasiljević (yellow card) 56'	Report	Fleišman (yellow card) 39'; Janů (yellow card) 67'; Blažek 120'	Stadium: Shakhter Stadium; Attendance: 15,000; Referee: Kenn Hansen (Denmark); Assistant referees: Lars Rix (Denmark), David Vang Andersen (Denmark); Fourth official: Jakob Kehlet (Denmark)
Note: Slovan Liberec won 2–1 on aggregate.

===== Third qualifying round =====
1 August 2012 First leg	CFR Cluj (Romania)	1–0	(Czech Republic) Slovan Liberec	Cluj-Napoca, Romania
21:45 EEST (UTC+3)	Cadú 53' (pen.); Deac (yellow card) 64'; Rada (yellow card) 70'; Camora (yellow card) 88'	Report	Breznaník (yellow card) 27'; Tóth (yellow card) 52'; Hadaščok (yellow card) 61'	Stadium: Stadionul Dr. Constantin Rădulescu; Attendance: 6,914; Referee: Bülent Yıldırım (Turkey); Assistant referees: Çem Satma (Turkey), Erdinç Sezertam (Turkey); Fourth official: Barış Şimşek (Turkey)

8 August 2012 Second leg	Slovan Liberec (Czech Republic)	1–2 (1–3 agg.)	(Romania) CFR Cluj	Liberec, Czech Republic
19:00 CEST (UTC+2)	Šural (yellow card) 46', (goal) 58'; Blažek (yellow card) 62'; Kelić (yellow card) 79'	Report	Kapetanos 45+1'; Rada (yellow card) 79'; Sougou 90+4'	Stadium: Stadion u Nisy; Attendance: 5,537; Referee: Serge Gumienny (Belgium); Assistant referees: Frank Bleyen (Belgium), Kristof Meers (Belgium); Fourth official: Peter Vervecken (Belgium)
Note: CFR Cluj won 3–1 on aggregate.

=== UEFA Europa League ===
==== Play-off round ====
23 August 2012 First leg	Slovan Liberec (Czech Republic)	2–2	(Ukraine) Dnipro Dnipropetrovsk	Liberec, Czech Republic
19:00 CEST (UTC+2)	Breznaník 62'; Hadaščok (yellow card) 65'; Janů (yellow card) 67'; Vácha 90' (pen.)	Report	Konoplyanka 43'; Matheus 49'; Mazuch (yellow card) 90'	Stadium: Stadion u Nisy; Attendance: 4,226; Referee: Pol van Boekel (Netherlands); Assistant referees: Angelo Boonman (Netherlands), Rob van de Ven (Netherlands); Fourth official: Serdar Gözübüyük (Netherlands)

30 August 2012 Second leg	Dnipro Dnipropetrovsk (Ukraine)	4–2 (6–4 agg.)	(Czech Republic) Slovan Liberec	Dnipropetrovsk, Ukraine
19:00 EEST (UTC+3)	Aliyev 12' (pen.), 59' (pen.); Odibe (yellow card) 69'; Konoplyanka 76'; Cheberyachko (yellow card) 82'; Kalinić 87'	Report	Nezmar (yellow card) 12' (yellow-red card) 25'; Kušnír (yellow card) 14'; Kelić (yellow card) 31', (goal) 72'; Bičík (yellow card) 58'; Breznaník 61'; Lyulka (yellow card) 68'	Stadium: Dnipro Arena; Attendance: 27,076; Referee: Duarte Gomes (Portugal); Assistant referees: Tiago Trigo (Portugal), Ricardo Santos (Portugal); Fourth official: Marco Ferreira (Portugal)
Note: Dnipro Dnipropetrovsk won 6–4 on aggregate.
