= 2018–19 Czech National Football League =

Czech National Football League
- Champions: České Budějovice (3rd title)
- Promoted: České Budějovice
- Relegated: Znojmo, Táborsko
- Matches: 240
- Goals: 634 (2.64 per match)
- Top goalscorer: David Ledecký (18)
- Biggest home win: Brno 6–0 Žižkov, Varnsdorf 7–1 Znojmo
- Biggest away win: Vítkovice 0–6 Znojmo
- Highest scoring: Varnsdorf 7–1 Znojmo
- Longest winning run: 12 matches (České Budějovice)
- Longest unbeaten run: 15 matches (České Budějovice)

The 2018–19 Czech National Football League was the 26th season of the Czech Republic's second tier football league. SK Dynamo České Budějovice won their third second division title, and were promoted.

== From FNL ==
- Opava (promoted to 2018–19 Czech First League)
- Příbram (promoted to 2018–19 Czech First League)
- Olympia Prague (relegated to Bohemian Football League)
- Frýdek-Místek (relegated to Moravian–Silesian Football League)

== To FNL ==
- Zbrojovka Brno (relegated from 2017–18 Czech First League)
- Vysočina Jihlava (relegated from 2017–18 Czech First League)
- Chrudim (promoted from 2017–18 Bohemian Football League)
- Prostějov (promoted from 2017–18 Moravian–Silesian Football League)

== Team overview ==
Location of clubs in the 2018–19 2. Liga

== League table ==
Pos	Team	Pld	W	D	L	GF	GA	GD	Pts	Promotion or relegation
1	Dynamo České Budějovice (C, P)	30	23	3	4	60	24	+36	72	Promotion to 2019–20 I. liga
2	Vysočina Jihlava	30	17	7	6	50	33	+17	58	Qualification for promotion play-offs
3	FC Zbrojovka Brno	30	17	6	7	63	31	+32	57	Qualification for promotion play-offs
4	Hradec Králové	30	15	8	7	36	18	+18	53	
5	FK Ústí nad Labem	30	15	4	11	44	39	+5	49	
6	FK Varnsdorf	30	13	9	8	33	26	+7	48	
7	FK Pardubice	30	11	11	8	45	34	+11	44	
8	Vítkovice	30	11	7	12	32	44	−12	40	
9	1. SK Prostějov	30	9	9	12	28	37	−9	36	
10	Fotbal Třinec	30	10	6	14	36	42	−6	36	
11	Baník Sokolov	30	9	6	15	28	40	−12	33	
12	Vlašim	30	7	11	12	30	38	−8	32	
13	MFK Chrudim	30	8	5	17	39	56	−17	29	
14	Viktoria Žižkov	30	7	6	17	33	59	−26	27	
15	Táborsko (R)	30	6	7	17	37	53	−16	25	Relegation to 2019–20 ČFL
16	Znojmo (R)	30	6	7	17	40	60	−20	25	Relegation to 2019–20 MSFL

Source: Fortuna národní liga
Rules for classification: 1) Points; 2) Goal difference; 3) Goals scored.
(C) Champions; (P) Promoted; (R) Relegated

== Results ==
Each team plays home-and-away against every other team in the league, for a total of 30 matches played each.

Home \ Away	BSO	DYN	FTR	HRK	JIH	MFK	PAR	PRO	TAB	UST	VAR	VIT	VLA	VZI	ZBR	ZNO
Sokolov	—	0–2	1–0	1–3	2–2	0–1	1–0	3–0	0–2	1–5	2–3	4–0	2–0	1–0	0–2	2–2
České Budějovice	1–0	—	3–1	3–1	2–0	3–1	1–0	3–1	4–0	2–0	3–0	3–0	1–0	4–1	3–2	1–2
Třinec	2–0	2–3	—	2–2	1–2	2–1	1–2	0–2	1–1	1–2	2–0	1–1	0–0	4–0	2–1	1–1
Hradec Králové	2–0	1–0	1–0	—	0–1	3–1	4–1	3–0	1–0	2–0	0–1	0–0	3–1	4–0	0–1	2–1
Vysočina Jihlava	1–0	1–1	2–1	0–1	—	2–0	1–0	1–0	2–1	4–1	3–1	2–2	3–0	4–1	1–6	2–1
Chrudim	1–2	2–2	1–2	1–0	4–3	—	1–1	4–0	2–1	2–3	0–1	1–2	2–1	1–2	1–2	4–1
Pardubice	0–0	2–0	4–0	0–0	0–0	4–0	—	2–1	3–2	2–0	0–0	3–1	0–0	2–1	1–1	3–1
Prostějov	2–1	0–1	0–1	0–0	1–1	0–0	2–2	—	2–1	1–0	0–2	0–0	2–2	0–0	2–1	5–1
Táborsko	0–1	1–1	1–1	0–1	1–1	0–1	3–3	1–1	—	2–3	2–3	4–2	2–2	2–1	1–2	1–0
Ústí nad Labem	2–1	0–1	1–0	0–1	2–3	3–1	3–1	2–1	3–0	—	0–2	2–1	0–0	4–1	2–2	2–1
Varnsdorf	0–0	0–1	0–1	1–0	1–0	2–2	0–0	0–0	1–0	1–0	—	0–0	0–2	3–1	2–0	7–1
Vítkovice	2–0	1–2	3–1	0–0	1–0	2–1	1–0	0–2	1–0	1–1	2–0	—	1–0	2–0	2–4	0–6
Vlašim	3–0	0–1	0–3	0–0	1–1	2–1	2–0	0–1	2–3	1–2	1–1	1–0	—	2–1	2–2	2–2
Viktoria Žižkov	1–1	1–2	0–3	1–1	0–1	1–1	4–4	4–1	2–1	0–1	2–0	2–0	2–0	—	3–2	1–1
Brno	0–0	2–1	5–0	2–0	1–3	3–0	3–1	1–0	4–1	0–0	0–0	4–1	1–2	6–0	—	2–0
Znojmo	1–2	2–5	2–0	0–0	0–3	6–1	0–4	0–1	2–3	3–0	1–1	0–3	1–1	1–0	0–1	—

Source: https://www.fnliga.cz/
Legend: Blue = home team win; Yellow = draw; Red = away team win.
For upcoming matches, an "a" indicates there is an article about the rivalry between the two participants.

== Top scorers ==
Rank	Player	Club	Goals
1	(Czech Republic) David Ledecký	České Budějovice	18
2	(Czech Republic) Lukáš Zoubele	Jihlava	12
2	(Czech Republic) Lukáš Magera	Brno	12
4	(Slovakia) Peter Štepanovský	Brno	11
4	(Czech Republic) Michal Petráň	Pardubice	11
4	(Czech Republic) Zbyněk Musiol	Táborsko	11
7	(Czech Republic) Stanislav Klobása	Jihlava	9
7	(Czech Republic) Ivo Táborský	České Budějovice	9
7	(Czech Republic) Vojtěch Hadaščok	Vlašim	9
10	4 players		8
