= Ricka =

Ricka is a surname and a masculine given name. Notable people and characters with the name include:

- Ricka Stenger (born 1979), Danish Paralympic swimmer
- Pavel Ricka (born 1987), Czech footballer
- One of the triplets depicted in the children's book Flicka, Ricka, Dicka
