= Ivo Svoboda =

Ivo Svoboda may refer to:

- Ivo Svoboda (footballer) (born 1977), professional Czech football player
- Ivo Svoboda (politician) (1948–2017), Minister of Finance of the Czech Republic 1998–99
