= Vrťo =

Vrt'o is a surname. Notable people with the surname include:

- Dušan Vrťo (born 1965), Slovak footballer
- Tomáš Vrťo (born 1988), Czech footballer
