= 2007 FIFA U-20 World Cup final =

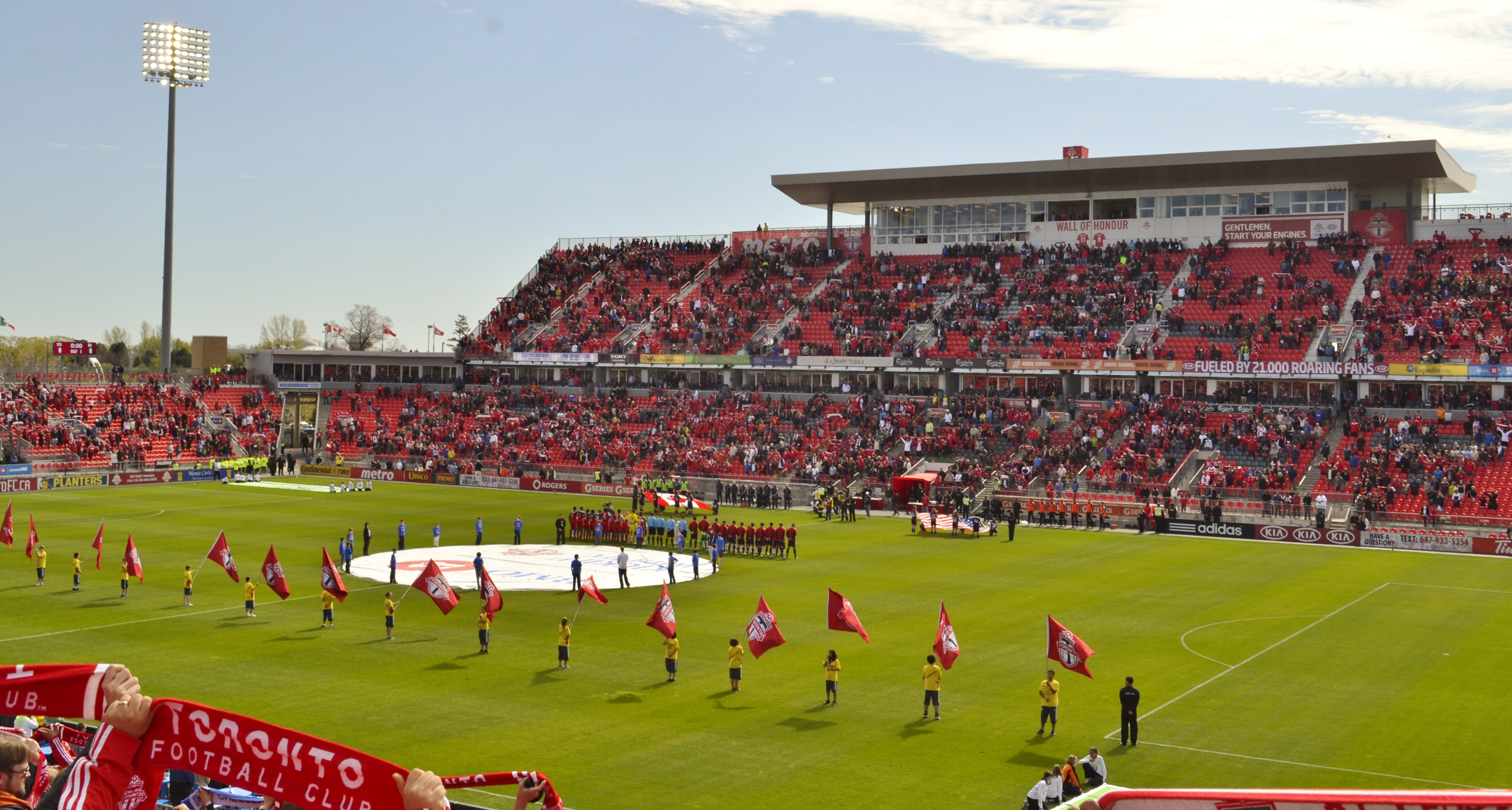
- The BMO Field in 2012
- Event: 2007 FIFA U-20 World Cup
Czech Republic	Argentina
(Czech Republic)	(Argentina)
1	2
- Date: 22 July 2007
- Venue: BMO Field, Toronto
- Man of the Match: Sergio Agüero (Argentina)
- Referee: Alberto Undiano Mallenco (Spain)
- Attendance: 19,526

The 2007 FIFA U-20 World Cup final was the final match and culmination of the 2007 FIFA U-20 World Cup, hosted by Canada. The match was played at the BMO Field in Toronto on 22 July 2007, and was contested by Argentina and the Czech Republic, being the seventh final for Argentina and the first for the Czechs. The match was won by Argentina 2–1, obtaining their sixth FIFA U-20 World Cup and becoming the most successful team at the tournament.

== Background ==
At the 2007 World Cup, Argentina U-20 was seeking the back-to-back trophy, having previously won the 2005 FIFA World Youth Championship in the Netherlands, where a Messi-led team defeated Nigeria 2–1 in the final. In 2007, then Atlético Madrid striker Sergio Agüero captained the team. For the Czechs, the final in Toronto marked their first final at a FIFA U-20 World Cup since appearing as an independent country for the first time in the 2001 FIFA U-20 World Cup in Argentina, and remains, to October 2025, as their country's best performance at a youth tournament.

Both Argentina and the Czech Republic were pooled into Group E, facing each other in the first match of the group, which ended in a goalless draw. Argentina went on to crush Panama 6–0 and narrowly defeat North Korea 1–0, while the Czechs' game with North Korea ended in a 2–2 draw, to later defeat Panama 2–1 in the group's last match day. Argentina advanced to the round of 16 with seven points, while the Czech Republic secured the second place. Both North Korea and Panama were eliminated in that first round.

The road to the final was harder for Czechia than for Argentina. In the round of 16, the Czechs advanced to the next round after a hard-fought match against Japan, eventually defeating them by penalties. In the quarter-finals, Czechia held another draw, this time with Spain. By scoring the first four penalty kicks, the Czechs advanced to the semifinals, where they defeated Austria 2–0.

Argentina, on the other side, defeated Poland in the round of 16 (3–1), Mexico in the quarter-finals by a margin of 1–0, and the hosts Chile by a score of 3–0 in a controversial and tense match which ended with Chilean players confronting the match's official, German referee Wolfgang Stark, and later clashing with Toronto police, which left some of the Chilean players pepper-sprayed, tasered, and briefly arrested by Canadian police. The match reached diplomacy when Chilean President Michelle Bachelet filed a complaint against the Canadian government and protests took place in Santiago against the alleged repression and racism of Canadian police. The Canadian embassy in Santiago received a bomb threat and security around the building was upgraded. Prime Minister Stephen Harper minimized the issue and didn't comment further.

== Match ==
The final match took place at the BMO Field in Toronto, with an attendance of 19,526 and the officiating of Spanish referee Alberto Undiano Mallenco, who was assisted on the lines by fellow Spaniards Fermín Martínez Núñez and Juan Carlos Yuste Jiménez. Ravshan Irmatov from Uzbekistan was assigned as the fourth referee.

A total of ten yellow cards were shown by Undiano Mallenco, six to the Czechs and four to the Argentines. More than 20 faults were committed by both teams, while ball possession was largely positive for Argentina, ending the match with 61% against 39% of possession for the Czechs. After an uneventful first half, Martin Fenin surprisingly put Czechia in a brief advantage before Sergio Agüero equalized two minutes later. Mauro Zárate made it 2–1 on the 86th, winning Argentina the match.

John F. Molinaro of CBC News highlighted the contrast between both teams, noting the differences in styles, adjudicating "grit" to the Czechs and "flair" to the Argentines. Molinaro also said that the Czechs played a physical game while Argentina relied on a flurry of quick and short passes to advance in the field.

Argentina became the most-successful team in the FIFA U-20 World Cup by achieving their sixth title, having won all of their finals in the category except for one.

== Road to the final ==
Argentina
Round
Czech Republic
Opponent
Result
Group stage
Opponent
Result
Czech Republic
0–0
Match 1
Argentina
0–0
Panama
6–0
Match 2
North Korea
2–2
North Korea
1–0
Match 3
Panama
2–1

Team	Pld	W	D	L	GF	GA	GD	Pts
Argentina	3	2	1	0	7	0	+7	7
Czech Republic	3	1	2	0	4	3	+1	5
North Korea	3	0	2	1	2	3	−1	2
Panama	3	0	1	2	1	8	−7	1

Final standing

Team	Pld	W	D	L	GF	GA	GD	Pts
Argentina	3	2	1	0	7	0	+7	7
Czech Republic	3	1	2	0	4	3	+1	5
North Korea	3	0	2	1	2	3	−1	2
Panama	3	0	1	2	1	8	−7	1

Opponent
Result
Knockout stage
Opponent
Result
Poland
3–1
Round of 16
Japan
2–2 (a.e.t.)
(4–3 p)
Mexico
1–0
Quarter-finals
Spain
1–1 (a.e.t.)
(4–3 p)
Chile
3–0
Semi-finals
Austria
2–0

=== Details ===
22 July 2007
15:15 (UTC–4)

Czech Republic	1–2	Argentina
Fenin 60'		Agüero 62'; Zárate 86'

National Soccer Stadium, Toronto
Attendance: 19,526
Referee: Alberto Undiano Mallenco (Spain)

Czech Republic	Argentina

GK	1	Radek Petr
RB	17	Marek Suchý
CB	4	Ondřej Mazuch	(yellow card) 81'
CB	5	Jan Šimůnek (c)	(yellow card) 35'
LB	6	Ondřej Kúdela	(yellow card) 14'
CM	13	Tomáš Mičola	(yellow card) 73'
CM	19	Luboš Kalouda
CM	15	Marek Střeštík		(substituted off) 83'
RF	10	Jakub Mareš		(substituted off) 76'
CF	9	Martin Fenin	(yellow card) 87'
LF	3	Lukáš Kubáň	(yellow card) 1'
Substitutes:
MF	14	Marcel Gecov		(substituted on) 76'
FW	18	Tomáš Pekhart		(substituted on) 83'
Manager:
Miroslav Soukup

GK	1	Sergio Romero
CB	4	Gabriel Mercado	(yellow card) 33'
CB	14	Leonardo Sigali
CB	2	Federico Fazio
DM	8	Matías Sánchez	(yellow card) 25'
RM	9	Mauro Zárate	(yellow card) 40'
CM	5	Éver Banega	(yellow card) 90+2'
LM	3	Emiliano Insúa
AM	17	Maxi Moralez		(substituted off) 90+3'
AM	19	Pablo Piatti		(substituted off) 80'
CF	10	Sergio Agüero (c)
Substitutes:
MF	15	Ariel Cabral		(substituted on) 80'
FW	20	Lautaro Acosta		(substituted on) 90+3'
Manager:
Hugo Tocalli

Man of the Match:
Sergio Agüero (Argentina)

Assistant referees:
Fermín Martínez Ibáñez (Spain)
Juan Carlos Yuste Jiménez (Spain)
Fourth official:
Ravshan Irmatov (Uzbekistan)

Match rules:

- 90 minutes.
- 30 minutes of extra time if necessary.
- Penalty shoot-out if scores still level.
