= Alberto Undiano Mallenco =

Spanish football referee

Alberto Undiano
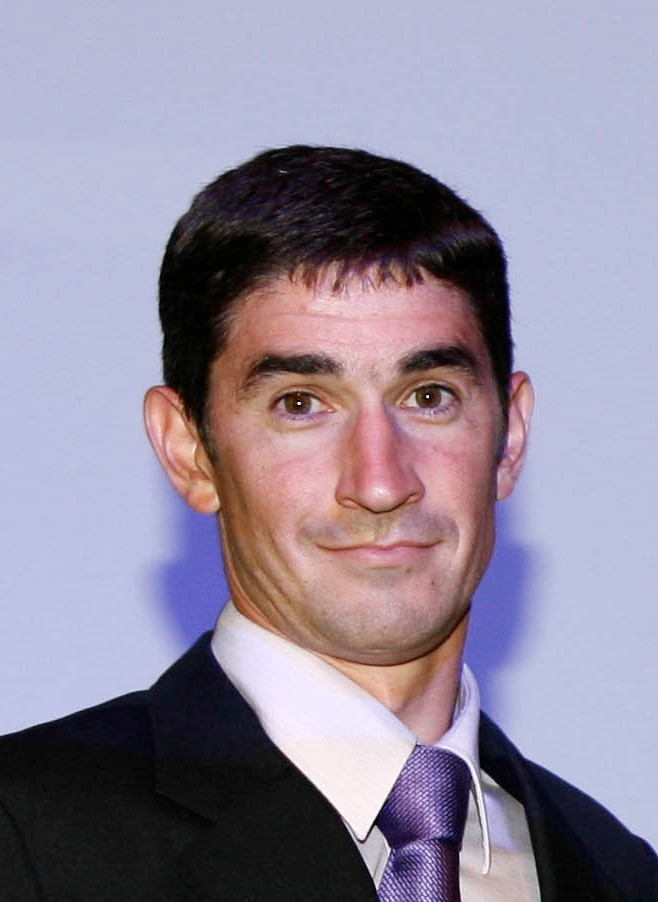
- Full name: Alberto Undiano Mallenco
- Born: 8 October 1973 (age 53); Pamplona, Navarra, Spain
- Other occupation: Sociologist

Domestic
Years	League	Role
2000–2019	La Liga	Referee

International
Years	League	Role
2004–2019	FIFA listed	Referee

Alberto Undiano Mallenco (Spanish pronunciation: [alˈβeɾto wnˈdjano maˈʎeŋko]; born 6 October 1973) is a retired Spanish football referee. He was a full international referee for FIFA from 2004 to 2019. Undiano is also a part-time sociologist.

== Career ==
Mallenco was born in Pamplona.

=== Club ===
On 8 May 2019, Mallenco refereed the 2018–19 Armenian Cup between Alashkert and Lori.

He refereed in La Liga from 2000 to 2019.

=== International ===
==== 2007 FIFA U-20 World Cup ====
Undiano was selected as a referee for the 2007 FIFA U-20 World Cup in Canada, where he refereed the match between Canada and Chile on 1 July 2007. He also refereed the final match between Argentina and Czech Republic on 22 July 2007.

==== 2010 FIFA World Cup ====
Undiano was selected as a referee for the 2010 FIFA World Cup in South Africa. He was the only Spanish referee at the 2010 FIFA World Cup. The group stage game between Germany and Serbia resulted in a 1–0 win for Serbia. Undiano gave a second yellow card to German player Miroslav Klose in the 36th minute, thus resulting in a red card. In the 59th minute Nemanja Vidić received a yellow card for handball, also resulting in a penalty. Undiano awarded yellow cards to Klose (2), Branislav Ivanović, Aleksandar Kolarov, Sami Khedira, Philipp Lahm, Neven Subotić, Bastian Schweinsteiger and Nemanja Vidić – a total of nine yellow cards.

== Nations League ==
He refereed the 2019 UEFA Nations League Final. It was his last game as a professional referee.

== Honours ==
- Don Balón Award (Best Spanish Referee) : 2005 and 2007

== Selected performances ==
2010 FIFA World Cup – South Africa
Date	Match	Result	Round	Venue
18 June 2010	Germany – Serbia	0–1	Group stage	Nelson Mandela Bay Stadium, Port Elizabeth
25 June 2010	North Korea – Ivory Coast	0–3	Group stage	Mbombela Stadium, Nelspruit
28 June 2010	Netherlands – Slovakia	2–1	Round of 16	Moses Mabhida Stadium, Durban
2007 FIFA U-20 World Cup – Canada
22 July 2007	Czech Republic – Argentina	1–2	Final	BMO Field, Toronto

== See also ==
- List of football referees

Sporting positions (Spain) Alberto Undiano Mallenco
Preceded by none	2019 UEFA Nations League Final Referee	Succeeded by (England) Anthony Taylor
