= Ravshan Irmatov =

Uzbek professional football referee

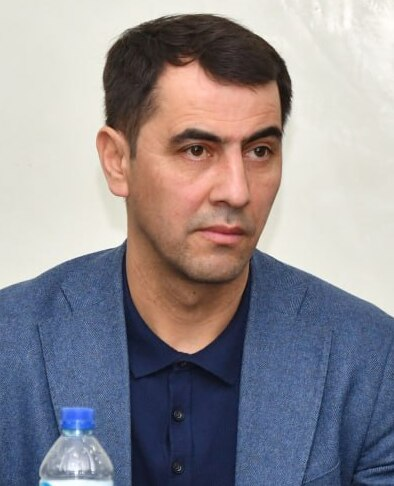
- Irmatov in 2023
- Full name: Ravshan Sayfiddinovich Irmatov
- Born: 9 August 1977 (age 49); Tashkent, Uzbek SSR, Soviet Union (now Uzbekistan)
- Other occupation: Teacher

Domestic
Years	League	Role
2000–2019	Uzbek League	Referee

International
Years	League	Role
2003–2019	FIFA listed	Referee

Ravshan Sayfiddinovich Irmatov (born 9 August 1977) is an Uzbek professional football referee. He officiated in the Uzbek League from 2000–2019 and internationally from 2003–2019. Irmatov holds the record for officiating the most FIFA World Cup matches with 11.

In June 2019, Ravshan Irmatov was appointed as the first Vice-President of the Uzbekistan Football Association. The first Vice-President of this organization is the de facto leader of Uzbekistan’s football. He began reforms in Uzbekistani football after long criticism and corruption scandals in the country's football. During the inauguration, he said, “If we all come together and work for the same goal, we will overcome any difficulties”.

== Biography and career ==
Irmatov was born on 9 August 1977, in Tashkent in a footballer's family. His father was also a referee, working in Soviet competitions. He has been a full international referee for FIFA since 2003 and is considered one of the elite referees in the world. He was selected as a referee for the 2007 FIFA U-20 World Cup in Canada, where he refereed the group-stage match between Gambia and Mexico, as well as the match between Chile and Congo. He was also selected as the fourth referee for the final match between Argentina and the Czech Republic at the BMO Field in Toronto.

He was named The Best Referee in Asia for four consecutive years (2008, 2009, 2010, 2011 and also in 2014), and was selected to officiate the final of both the 2008 and 2011 FIFA Club World Cup.

Irmatov was selected as a referee for the 2010 FIFA World Cup and was in charge of the opening match between South Africa and Mexico on 11 June. Irmatov equalled the record for number of matches in charge in a single FIFA World Cup when he took charge of the Netherlands-Uruguay semi-final. He took charge of the World Cup 2010 Group C Fixture, where England met Algeria in Cape Town – thus becoming the youngest official to take charge of an opening World Cup match since 1934 and the youngest referee of 2010 FIFA World Cup. Irmatov also officiated at the 2011 AFC Asian Cup and was selected to referee the final between Australia and Japan. At the 2012 Summer Olympics in London, he took charge of the bronze medal match between South Korea and Japan.

Irmatov was selected as a referee at the 2013 FIFA Confederations Cup. In the Group A match between Brazil and Italy on 22 June, he blew his whistle to award Italy a penalty and was seen pointing at the penalty spot. A second later, as play continued, Giorgio Chiellini scored with a low shot, with Irmatov instead pointing to the halfway line to signal a goal. Irmatov admitted to his mistake after the game saying: “While I was whistling for a penalty, out of the corner of my eye I saw the goal and I thought advantage should be played and gave the goal.”

On 27 December 2015, at Globe Soccer Awards ceremony in Dubai Ravshan Irmatov was named as Best Referee of the Year in 2015. On 31 December 2015, the president of Uzbekistan Islam Karimov signed a decree “On awarding Ravshan Irmatov with the order Buyuk Hizmatlari Uchun” (For outstanding services). On 4 March 2016, Irmatov was named Referee of the Year 2015 in Uzbekistan by the Football Federation for 10th time after survey results among sport journalists.

In 2023, Irmatov was elected to be the AFC executive committee representative of the central zone.

== Honours ==
=== Individual ===
- Uzbekistan Referee of the Year (10): 2006, 2007, 2008, 2009, 2010, 2011, 2012, 2013, 2014, 2015
- AFC Referee of the Year (5): 2008, 2009, 2010, 2011, 2014
- Globe Soccer Award for the Best Referee of the Year: 2015

=== Order ===
- El-Yurt Hurmati (Honour of people and Motherland) in 2014
- Buyuk Hizmatlari Uchun (For outstanding services) in 2015

== Matches ==
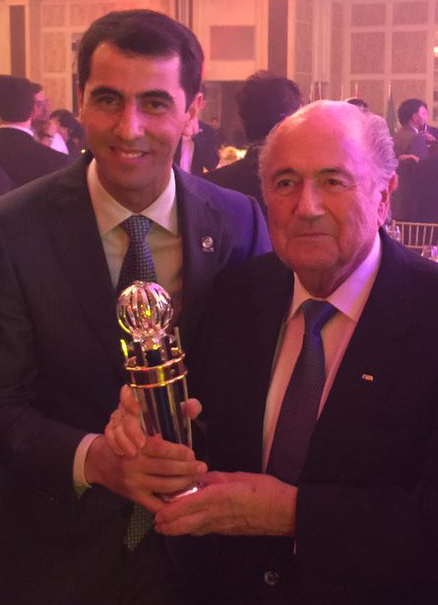
Irmatov with FIFA president Sepp Blatter in 2013

- 2019 AFC Asian Cup
  - Syria vs Palestine
  - Iran vs Iraq
  - Japan vs Saudi Arabia (round of 16)
  - South Korea vs Qatar (quarter-finals)
  - Japan vs Qatar (final)
- 2018 FIFA World Cup
  - Argentina vs Croatia
  - Spain vs Morocco
- 2017 FIFA Club World Cup
  - Pachuca (Mexico) vs (Morocco) Wydad AC (second round)
- 2017 FIFA Confederations Cup
  - Video assistant referee
- 2018 FIFA World Cup qualification (AFC)
  - Syria vs Japan (second round)
  - Saudi Arabia vs Australia (third round)
  - United Arab Emirates vs Japan (third round)
  - Australia vs Saudi Arabia (third round)
  - Australia vs Syria (fourth round)
- 2015 AFC Asian Cup
  - Australia vs Kuwait
  - Qatar vs Iran
  - Japan vs Jordan
  - Australia vs United Arab Emirates (semi-final)
- 2014 FIFA World Cup
  - Switzerland vs Ecuador
  - Croatia vs Mexico
  - United States vs Germany
  - Netherlands vs Costa Rica (quarter-finals)
- 2013 FIFA Confederations Cup
  - Italy vs Brazil
- 2013 EAFF East Asian Cup
  - South Korea vs Japan (final tournament)
- 2012 AFF Suzuki Cup
  - Thailand vs Singapore (final leg 2nd)
- 2014 FIFA World Cup qualification (AFC)
  - Jordan vs China (third round)
  - Thailand vs Saudi Arabia (third round)
  - United Arab Emirates vs South Korea (third round)
  - Iran vs Qatar (third round)
- 2012 Summer Olympics
  - Great Britain vs Senegal
  - Mexico vs Switzerland
  - South Korea vs Japan (bronze medal match)
- 2011 FIFA Club World Cup
  - Monterrey (Mexico) vs (Tunisia) Espérance de Tunis (match for fifth place)
  - Santos (Brazil) vs (Spain) Barcelona (final)
- 2011 AFC Asian Cup
  - Iraq vs Iran
  - Saudi Arabia vs Japan
  - South Korea vs Iran (quarter-finals)
  - Australia vs Japan (final)
- 2010 FIFA World Cup
  - South Africa vs Mexico (Opening match)
  - England vs Algeria
  - Greece vs Argentina
  - Argentina vs Germany (quarter-finals)
  - Uruguay vs Netherlands (semi-finals)
- 2008 FIFA Club World Cup
  - Al Ahly (Egypt) vs (Mexico) Pachuca (quarter-finals)
  - LDU Quito (Ecuador) vs (England) Manchester United (final)

== See also ==
- List of football referees

Preceded by (Mexico) Marco Rodríguez	FIFA Club World Cup final match referees 2008 (Uzbekistan) Ravshan Irmatov	Succeeded by (Mexico) Benito Archundia
Preceded by (Japan) Yuichi Nishimura	FIFA Club World Cup final match referees 2011 (Uzbekistan) Ravshan Irmatov	Succeeded by (Turkey) Cüneyt Çakır
Preceded by (Australia) Mark Shield	AFC Asian Cup final match referees 2011 (Uzbekistan) Ravshan Irmatov	Succeeded by (Iran) Alireza Faghani
Preceded by (Japan) Ryuji Sato	AFC Champions League Second-leg Final referee 2017 (Uzbekistan) Ravshan Irmatov	Succeeded by (Oman) Ahmed Al-Kaf
Preceded by (Iran) Alireza Faghani	AFC Asian Cup final match referees 2019 (Uzbekistan) Ravshan Irmatov	Succeeded by (China) Ma Ning
