= Jiří Krystan =

Czech footballer

Personal information
- Date of birth: 31 January 1990 (age 36)
- Place of birth: Czechoslovakia
- Position: Midfielder

Team information
- Current team: FK Dobrovice

Senior career*
Years	Team	Apps	(Gls)
2011–2014	Slovan Liberec	3	(0)
2012	→ Bohemians Prague (loan)	10	(0)
2014–2015	Roudnice nad Labem		
2015–	FK Dobrovice		
2016–2017	→ Viktoria Žižkov (loan)	22	(0)
- * Club domestic league appearances and goals as of 12 October 2017

Jiří Krystan (born 31 January 1990) is a Czech footballer currently playing for FK Dobrovice. He plays as a midfielder.
