= Dzon Delarge =

Congolese footballer

Personal information
- Full name: Dzon Delarge
- Date of birth: 24 June 1990 (age 36)
- Place of birth: Brazzaville, Congo
- Height: 1.73 m (5 ft 8 in)
- Positions: Winger; forward

Youth career
- 2008–2009: Epéna de la Likouala

Senior career*
Years	Team	Apps	(Gls)
2010–2011	Union Douala		
2011–2012	Dunajská Streda	32	(8)
2012–2016	Slovan Liberec	74	(16)
2016–2017	Admira Wacker	0	(0)
2016–2017	→ Osmanlıspor (loan)	36	(1)
2017–2018	Bursaspor	25	(5)
2018–2019	Qarabağ	10	(2)
2019	→ Qarabağ-2 (loan)		
2019	Dynamo Budějovice	3	(0)
2020	Boluspor	8	(1)
2021	Akhisarspor	17	(5)

International career^{‡}
2012–	Congo	14	(1)
- * Club domestic league appearances and goals as of 15:14, 2 January 2022 (UTC) ‡ National team caps and goals as of 21 July 2018

Dzon Delarge (born 24 June 1990) is a Congolese footballer who plays as a winger.

== Career ==
He started his football career in Union Douala, a club from Cameroon, where has been spotted by the Slovak club DAC Dunajská Streda. He joined this club in July 2011.

He made his debut in Slovak Super Liga for Dunajská Streda against FC Spartak Trnava on 17 July 2011. Despite his 8 goals in 32 matches, the club was relegated to the Slovak Second League.

In summer 2012, he was transferred to Slovan Liberec, a club in the Czech Gambrinus liga.

On 24 July 2018, Delarge left Bursaspor and signed a three-year contract with Qarabağ FK. On 17 January 2019, Qarabağ announced that Delarge had been sent to train with Qarabağ-2.

== Honours ==
Slovan Liberec

- Czech Cup: 2014–15
