= Jiří Pimpara =

Czech footballer (born 1987)

Personal information
- Full name: Jiří Pimpara
- Date of birth: 4 February 1987 (age 39)
- Place of birth: Rumburk, Czechoslovakia
- Height: 1.90 m (6 ft 3 in)
- Position: Defender

Team information
- Current team: Ústí nad Labem
- Number: 5

Youth career
- Michalovce

Senior career*
Years	Team	Apps	(Gls)
2006–2010	Teplice	3	(0)
2009	→ Ústí nad Labem (loan)	9	(1)
2010–2012	Varnsdorf	71	(5)
2013–2017	Liberec	40	(2)
2015	→ Podbrezová (loan)	9	(0)
2016	→ Vlašim (loan)	12	(0)
2016	→ Viktoria Žižkov (loan)	16	(1)
2017	→ Ústí nad Labem (loan)	13	(0)
2017–	Ústí nad Labem	5	(0)
- * Club domestic league appearances and goals as of 8 September 2017

Jiří Pimpara (born 4 February 1987), is a Czech professional footballer who plays for Ústí nad Labem as a defender.

== Honours ==
Slovan Liberec

- Czech Cup: 2014–15
