= Marcel Šťastný =

Czech footballer (born 1983)

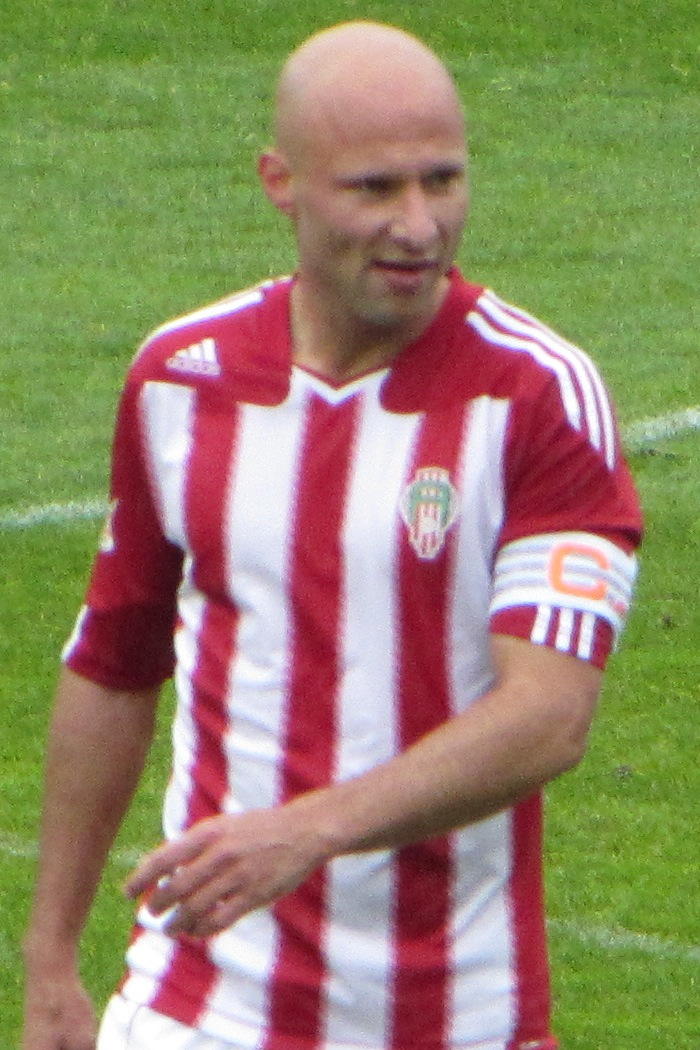
- Šťastný in 2014

Personal information
- Date of birth: 18 February 1983 (age 43)
- Place of birth: Czechoslovakia
- Height: 1.82 m (5 ft 11 1/2 in)
- Position: Defender

Team information
- Current team: Viktoria Žižkov
- Number: 18

Senior career*
| Years | Team | Apps | (Gls) |
| 2003–2005 | Viktoria Žižkov | | |
| 2005 | Pardubice | | |
| 2005– | Viktoria Žižkov | | |
| 2009 | → Nitra (loan) | 16 | (0) |
- * Club domestic league appearances and goals as of 20 July 2011

Marcel Šťastný (born 18 February 1983) is a Czech football player who currently plays for Viktoria Žižkov.
