= Petr Tlustý =

Czech footballer (born 1986)

Personal information
- Date of birth: 17 January 1986 (age 40)
- Place of birth: Czechoslovakia
- Height: 1.84 m (6 ft 0 in)
- Position: Defender

Team information
- Current team: FC Vysočina Jihlava
- Number: 17

Senior career*
Years	Team	Apps	(Gls)
2009–	FC Vysočina Jihlava	126	(5)
- * Club domestic league appearances and goals as of 1 June 2014

Petr Tlustý (born 17 January 1986) is a Czech football defender, who currently plays for FC Vysočina Jihlava.

== Career ==
Tlustý started playing football at the age of six in Prague, in the Žižkov district, after being introduced to the sport by his father. However, due to limited youth development opportunities there, he joined Slavia Prague a year later. He spent two years at the club before moving to FC Bohemians Prague in 1995. At Bohemians, he progressed through all youth categories up to the under-17 level.

In order to play in the highest youth league, he decided to return to Slavia Prague in 2003. He stayed there for two years, helping the team finish second in the top division of older youth teams. During the summer preparation period, after moving to the reserve team, he suffered a cruciate ligament injury in his knee. After six months of rehabilitation, he joined FK Slavoj Vyšehrad on loan and later signed permanently with the club in the summer of 2007, following its promotion to the Czech Third League (ČFL).

After half a season in the third tier, he attracted interest from FC Vysočina Jihlava. He first joined the club on trial, where he met his former Slavia teammate Martin Bayer. Unlike Bayer, Tlustý impressed and moved to the second-tier Jihlava initially on loan, with the move becoming permanent after six months. He later became a regular member of Vysočina's starting lineup and helped the club earn promotion to the Czech First League in the 2011–12 season.

== Honours ==
- SK Slavia Praha
  - Runner-up in the Czech top youth league
- FC Vysočina Jihlava
  - Promotion to the Czech First League (2011–12)
