= David Ledecký =

Czech footballer

Personal information
- Full name: David Ledecký
- Date of birth: 24 July 1993 (age 33)
- Place of birth: Brandýs nad Labem-Stará Boleslav, Czech Republic
- Height: 1.84 m (6 ft 1/2 in)
- Position: Forward

Team information
- Current team: SK Wullersdorf
- Number: 20

Youth career
- 2000–2012: Sparta Prague

Senior career*
Years	Team	Apps	(Gls)
2012–2014	Sparta Prague	0	(0)
2012	→ Hlavice (loan)		
2014	→ Jablonec B (loan)		
2014–2016	Znojmo FK	58	(18)
2016–2018	Górnik Zabrze	36	(5)
2017	Górnik Zabrze II	8	(4)
2018	→ Odra Opole (loan)	10	(0)
2018–2021	České Budějovice	60	(23)
2021–2022	Teplice	25	(2)
2022	→ Silon Táborsko (loan)	12	(2)
2023	Znojmo FK	15	(3)
2023–	SK Wullersdorf	23	(14)
- * Club domestic league appearances and goals as of 09:45, 24 July 2024 (UTC)

David Ledecký (born 24 July 1993) is a Czech professional footballer who plays as a forward for Austrian club SK Wullersdorf.
