= Luboš Loučka =

Czech football manager and former player (born 1982)

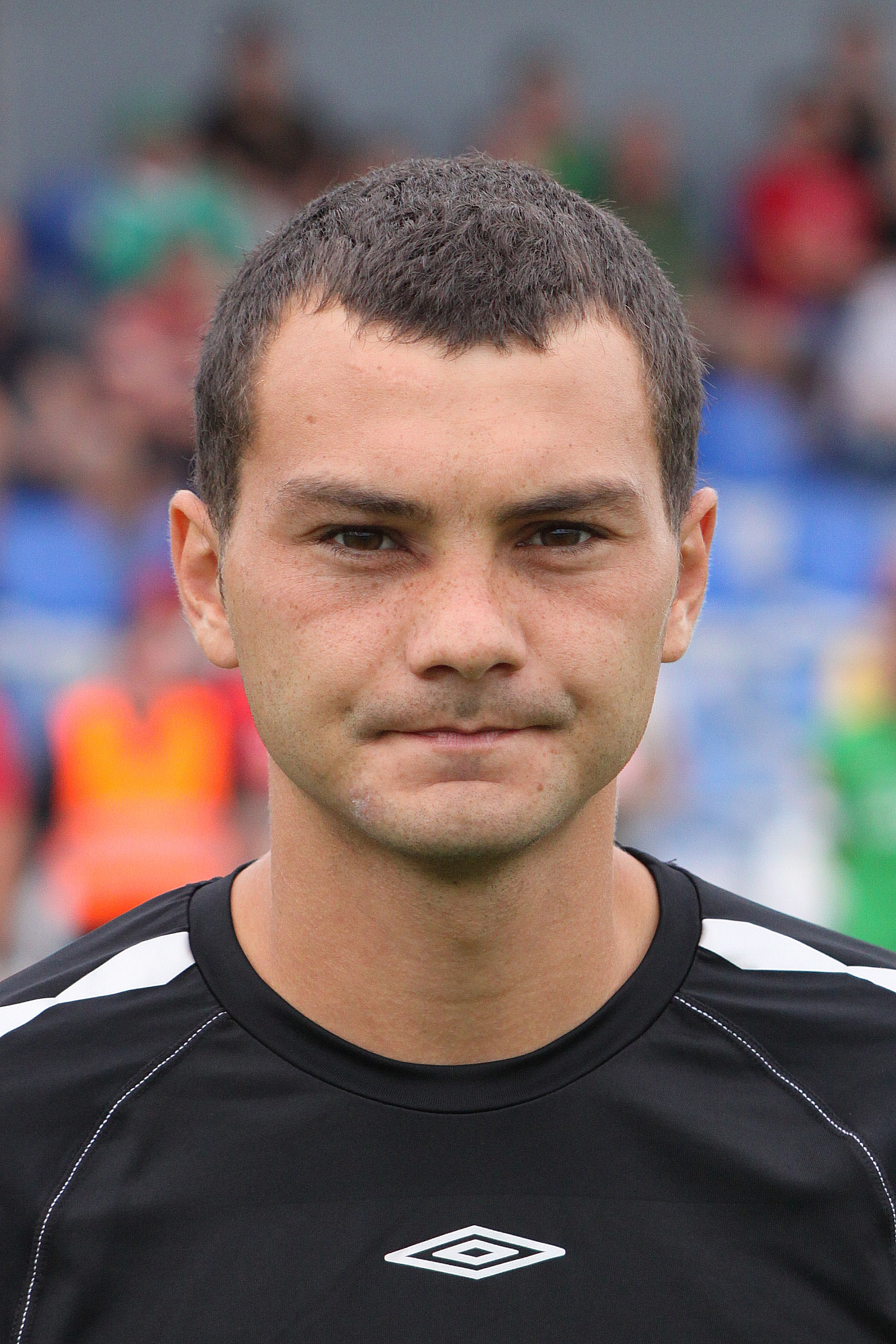

Personal information
- Date of birth: 25 August 1982 (age 44)
- Place of birth: Chrudim, Czechoslovakia
- Height: 1.76 m (5 ft 9 in)

Team information
- Current team: Sparta Prague B (manager)

Youth career
- 1988–1992: AFK Chrudim
- 1992–1994: SK Pardubice
- 1994–2000: Sparta Prague

Senior career*
Years	Team	Apps	(Gls)
2000–2003	Sparta Prague B		
2003–2004	→ Opava (loan)	25	(2)
2004–2005	Jablonec	32	(1)
2005–2006	Sparta Prague	5	(1)
2006–2015	Jablonec	117	(7)
2015–2018	Neugersdorf		

Managerial career
- 2018–2019: Sparta Prague (youth)
- 2019–2020: Sparta Prague B (assistant)
- 2020–2023: Sparta Prague (assistant)
- 2023–: Sparta Prague B
- 2025: Sparta Prague (caretaker)
- * Club domestic league appearances and goals as of 9 January 2019

Luboš Loučka (born 25 August 1982) is a Czech football manager and former player.

He was a Sparta Prague trainee, but did not break into the first team. In summer 2003 was loaned to Opava. A year later Loučka went to Jablonec where he scored his first goal in the Czech First League in the match against Viktoria Plzeň on 28 August 2005.

Sparta bought him back in summer 2005.
