= Artem Butenin =

Ukrainian footballer (born 1989)

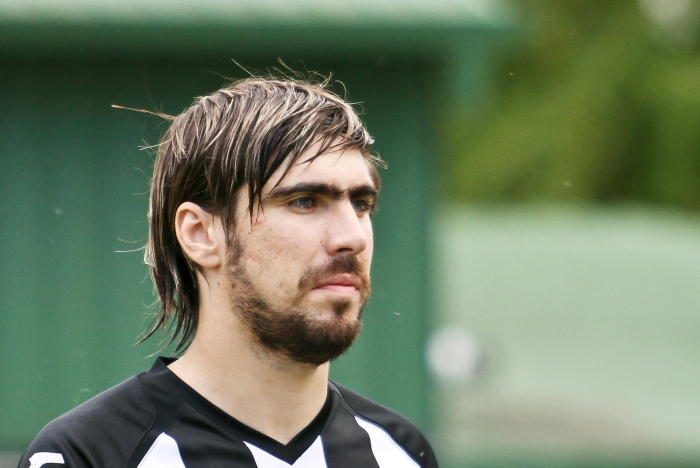

Personal information
- Full name: Artem Oleksiyovych Butenin
- Date of birth: 3 October 1989 (age 37)
- Place of birth: Kyiv, Soviet Union (now Ukraine)
- Height: 1.87 m (6 ft 2 in)
- Position: Defender

Youth career
- 2002–2006: FC Dynamo Kyiv

Senior career*
Years	Team	Apps	(Gls)
2006–2013	Dynamo Kyiv	0	(0)
2006–2013	→ Dynamo-2 Kyiv	171	(8)
2010	→ Volyn Lutsk (loan)	1	(0)
2012	→ Slovan Liberec (loan)	0	(0)
2014–2015	Poltava	34	(1)
2015	Zaria Bălți	0	(0)
2015	Ravan Baku	0	(0)

International career^{‡}
2004	Ukraine-15	1	(0)
2004–2005	Ukraine-16	12	(2)
2005–2006	Ukraine-17	13	(1)
2006–2007	Ukraine-18	10	(2)
2006–2008	Ukraine-19	8	(0)
2007	Ukraine-21	1	(0)
- * Club domestic league appearances and goals as of 4 April 2013 ‡ National team caps and goals as of 10 December 2010

Artem Oleksiyovych Butenin (Ukrainian: Артем Олексійович Бутенін, born 3 October 1989) is a Ukrainian former professional football defender.

== Career ==
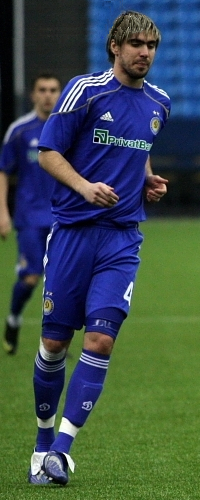
Playing for Dynamo-2 Kyiv

He is product of FC Dynamo Kyiv sportive school.

He was loaned to Volyn Lutsk in Ukrainian Premier League from July 2010.

In December 2015, he was disqualified for one year for doping.
