= Emil Rilke =

Czech footballer

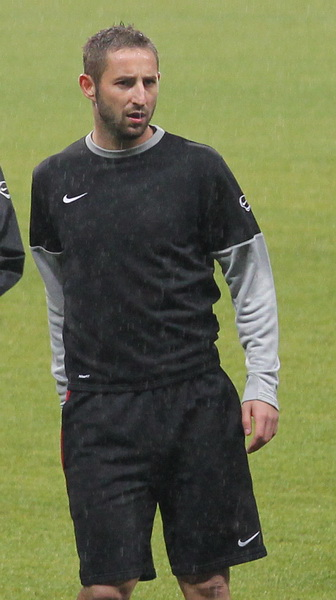

Personal information
- Full name: Emil Rilke
- Date of birth: 19 November 1983 (age 42)
- Place of birth: Ústí nad Labem, Czechoslovakia
- Height: 1.76 m (5 ft 9 in)
- Position: Winger

Youth career
- Chemika Ústí nad Labem
- Teplice

Senior career*
Years	Team	Apps	(Gls)
2003–2007	Teplice	62	(5)
2003	→ Opava (loan)	11	(0)
2007	→ Příbram (loan)	9	(1)
2007	→ Jablonec (loan)	9	(0)
2007	Most	11	(0)
2008–2011	Žilina	65	(14)
2011–2012	Slovan Liberec	14	(2)
2012–2013	Hansa Rostock	2	(0)
2013	Universitatea Cluj	10	(0)
2013–2014	Ústí nad Labem	6	(0)
2014–2018	TJ Krupka		
Total		199	(22)

International career
2004–2005	Czech Republic U21	8	(1)
- * Club domestic league appearances and goals as of 25 June 2020

Emil Rilke (born 19 November 1983) is a Czech former footballer who played as a midfielder. He played for Czech clubs including Teplice, Jablonec 97, SIAD Most, Slovan Liberec, and Ústí nad Labem. Abroad he played for Universitatea Cluj of Romania, German side Hansa Rostock, and Žilina of Slovakia. Rilke was a member of the Czech Republic Under-20 national team which competed in the 2003 U20 FIFA World Cup in the United Arab Emirates.

== Honours ==
Žilina

- Slovak Super Liga: 2009–10
- Slovak Super Cup: 2010

Slovan Liberec

- Czech First League: 2011–12
