= Michal Pávek =

Czech footballer (born 1985)

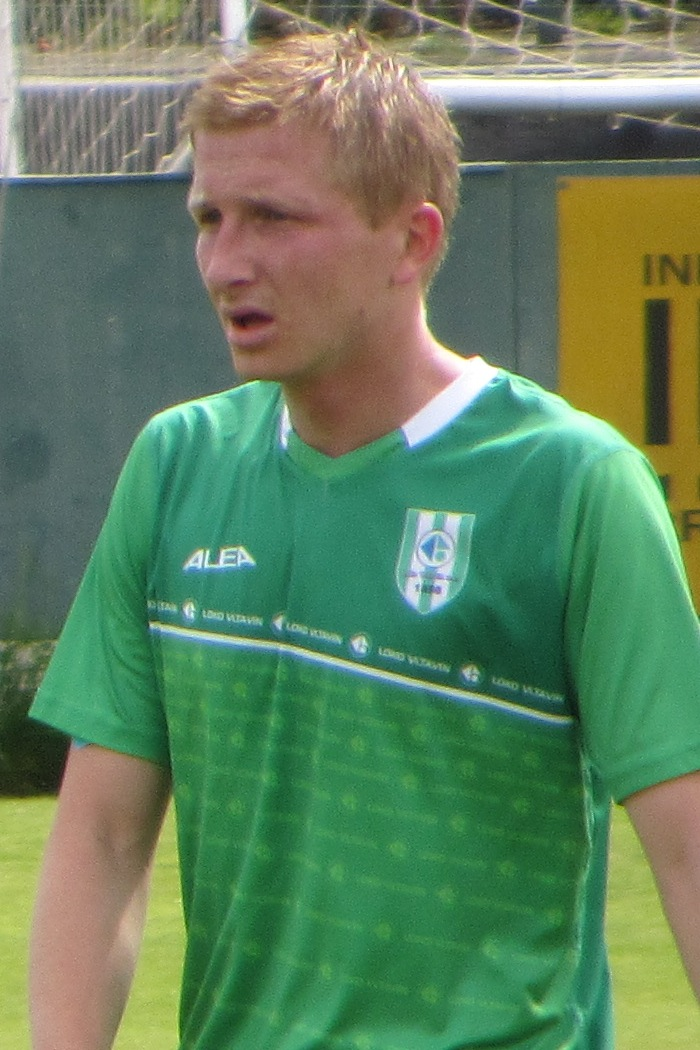
- Pávek with Vltavín in 2014

Personal information
- Date of birth: 13 February 1985 (age 41)
- Place of birth: Czechoslovakia
- Height: 1.85 m (6 ft 1 in)
- Position: Defender

Team information
- Current team: Ústí nad Labem
- Number: 17

Senior career*
Years	Team	Apps	(Gls)
2005–2010	Bohemians 1905	34	(0)
2010–2013	Hradec Králové	47	(1)
2013–2014	Loko Vltavín	27	(4)
2014–	Ústí nad Labem	3	(0)

International career^{‡}
2002	Czech Republic U-18	2	(0)
- * Club domestic league appearances and goals as of 31 August 2014 ‡ National team caps and goals as of 31 August 2014

Michal Pávek (born 13 February 1985) is a Czech football player who currently plays for Ústí nad Labem.
