= Dalibor Vašenda =

Czech footballer

Personal information
- Date of birth: 2 June 1991 (age 35)
- Place of birth: Czechoslovakia
- Height: 1.78 m (5 ft 10 in)
- Position: Midfielder

Team information
- Current team: FC Lalden
- Number: 26

Youth career
- 1996–2006: MFK Frýdek-Místek
- 2007–2011: Baník Ostrava

Senior career*
| Years | Team | Apps | (Gls) |
| 2011–2013 | Baník Ostrava | 34 | (1) |
| 2013–2016 | MFK Frýdek-Místek | 40 | (2) |
| 2016 | Nadwiślan Góra | 1 | (0) |
| 2016–2023 | FC Naters | | |
| 2023– | FC Lalden | | |

International career
| 2007–2008 | Czech Republic U17 | 4 | (0) |
| 2008–2009 | Czech Republic U18 | 10 | (1) |
| 2009–2010 | Czech Republic U19 | 2 | (0) |
- * Club domestic league appearances and goals as of 3 June 2024

Dalibor Vašenda (born 2 June 1991) is a Czech footballer who plays as a midfielder for Swiss club FC Lalden.
