= Zdeněk Volek =

Czech footballer

Personal information
- Date of birth: 12 April 1985 (age 41)
- Place of birth: Czechoslovakia
- Height: 1.72 m (5 ft 8 in)
- Position: Midfielder

Team information
- Current team: SC Amaliendorf-Aalfang
- Number: 17

Senior career*
Years	Team	Apps	(Gls)
2005–2008	Sparta Prague	0	(0)
2006	→ Blšany (loan)	12	(0)
2007–2008	→ Dukla Prague (loan)		
2008–2013	Ústí nad Labem	122	(23)
2012	→ Teplice (loan)	2	(0)
2013–2015	Ústí nad Labem	122	(23)
2015–2019	Viktoria Žižkov		
2019	Olympia Radotín	15	(1)
2019–	SC Amaliendorf-Aalfang	6	(1)

International career
2000–2001	Czech Republic U15	3	(0)
2002–2003	Czech Republic U18	10	(0)
- * Club domestic league appearances and goals as of 20:36, 25 September 2019 (UTC)

Zdeněk Volek (born 12 April 1985) is a Czech football player who currently plays for Austrian club SC Amaliendorf-Aalfang.

He played at youth level for the Czech Republic.
