= Matej Sivrić =

Croatian football forward (born 1989)

Personal information
- Date of birth: 27 November 1989 (age 36)
- Place of birth: Slavonski Brod, SFR Yugoslavia
- Height: 1.80 m (5 ft 11 in)
- Position: Forward

Team information
- Current team: Marsonia 1909
- Number: 17

Youth career
- 1999–2005: Marsonia
- 2005–2007: Livada Željezničar
- 2007–2008: Marsonia

Senior career*
Years	Team	Apps	(Gls)
2007–2008	Marsonia	10	(1)
2008	Maksimir	5	(0)
2009–2010	MV Croatia		
2010–2011	Slovan Liberec	7	(1)
2011–2012	Viktoria Žižkov	19	(4)
2012–2015	Mladá Boleslav	22	(4)
2013	→ Viktoria Žižkov (loan)	8	(3)
2015	→ Baník Ostrava (loan)	10	(1)
2015–2016	Karviná	13	(2)
2016	SK Benatky nad Jizerou		
2016–2017	Zrinjski Mostar	7	(0)
2017	Široki Brijeg	11	(1)
2017–	Marsonia		
- * Club domestic league appearances and goals as of 7 February 2018

Matej Sivrić (born 27 November 1989) is a Croatian football forward, who plays for NK Marsonia 1909 in Croatia.
