= Jan Broschinský =

Czech footballer

Personal information
- Date of birth: 1 September 1985 (age 41)
- Place of birth: Czechoslovakia
- Height: 1.82 m (6 ft 0 in)
- Position: Midfielder

Senior career*
Years	Team	Apps	(Gls)
2003–2008	Liberec	11	(0)
2005	→ Plzeň (loan)		
2005–2006	→ Blšany (loan)	21	(0)
2008–2009	Nitra	8	(1)
2009	Kladno	1	(0)
2010	Vlašim	8	(0)

International career^{‡}
2000–2001	Czech Republic U15	3	(0)
2002–2003	Czech Republic U18	9	(0)
2003–2004	Czech Republic U19	7	(0)
2003	Czech Republic U20	3	(0)
- * Club domestic league appearances and goals as of 17 September 2011 ‡ National team caps and goals as of 17 September 2011

Jan Broschinský (born 1 September 1985) is a Czech football midfielder who most recently played for Vlašim in the Czech 2. Liga. He represented his country at youth international level.
