= Petr Zieris =

Czech footballer (born 1989)

Personal information
- Date of birth: 19 March 1989 (age 37)
- Place of birth: Opava, Czechoslovakia
- Height: 1.90 m (6 ft 3 in)
- Position: Defender

Team information
- Current team: Slovan Varnsdorf
- Number: 3

Senior career*
Years	Team	Apps	(Gls)
2008–2009	Hradec Králové		
2009–2011	Náchod-Deštné		
2011–	Slovan Liberec	3	(0)
2012–	→ Slovan Varnsdorf (loan)	11	(3)
- * Club domestic league appearances and goals as of 27 October 2012

Petr Zieris (born 19 March 1989) is a Czech footballer currently playing for SK Slovan Varnsdorf on loan from Slovan Liberec. He plays as a central defender.
