= Ivo Svoboda (footballer) =

Czech footballer (born 1977)

Personal information
- Date of birth: 8 May 1977 (age 48)
- Place of birth: Czechoslovakia
- Height: 1.79 m (5 ft 10 in)
- Position(s): Forward

Senior career*
Years	Team	Apps	(Gls)
2000–2002	Slavia Prague	11	(1)
2000	→ Viktoria Plzeň (loan)	9	(2)
2001	→ České Budějovice (loan)	12	(3)
2002–2006	České Budějovice	42	(3)
2004	→ Drnovice (loan)	14	(0)
2006–2007	Jihlava	13	(1)
2007–2008	Hradec Králové		
2009–2010	Kolín		
2010–2012	Převýšov		
- *Club domestic league appearances and goals

Ivo Svoboda (born 8 May 1977) is a Czech former football player. He played in over 100 games in the Czech First League, for various clubs. In August 2011, he scored for Czech Fourth Division side SK Převýšov in their 3–0 Czech Cup win against former club Slavia Prague.
