= Vojtěch Hadaščok =

Czech footballer

Personal information
- Date of birth: 8 January 1992 (age 34)
- Place of birth: Opava, Czechoslovakia
- Height: 1.78 m (5 ft 10 in)
- Position: Striker

Youth career
- Opava

Senior career*
Years	Team	Apps	(Gls)
2011–2015	Slovan Liberec II	12	(1)
2011–2017	Slovan Liberec	66	(9)
2013	→ Hradec Králové (loan)	12	(0)
2014	→ Viktoria Žižkov (loan)	11	(1)
2015	→ FK Příbram (loan)	9	(0)
2016	→ Vlašim (loan)	12	(6)
2017–2018	Vlašim	54	(24)
2019–2021	Dukla Prague	41	(8)
2021–2022	FK Přepeře		

International career
2011	Czech Republic U19	6	(1)
2012	Czech Republic U20	1	(0)
2012–2014	Czech Republic U21	4	(0)
- * Club domestic league appearances and goals as of 18 July 2020

Vojtěch Hadaščok (born 8 January 1992) is a Czech former footballer, who played as a striker. He was on the books of Slovan Liberec for six years, during which time he won the 2011–12 Czech First League. After early success with the club, he later played for numerous clubs on loan. His other permanent clubs were Vlašim and Dukla Prague. He represented the Czech Republic at youth level.

== Playing career ==
=== Club career ===
Hadaščok arrived at Liberec in February 2011 and made his league debut against Jablonec on 27 February 2011. He won the Czech First League with Liberec in the 2011–12 season. He made his debut in the UEFA Champions League on the 17 July 2012 against FC Shakhter Karagandy. He scored the only goal of the game in the 23rd minute.

Hadaščok joined Hradec Králové on a half-season loan during the middle of the 2012–13 Czech First League. He went out on loan to Viktoria Žižkov of the Second League, playing the second half of the 2013–14 Czech National Football League for the club. He was loaned to Příbram for half a season at the start of the 2015–16 Czech First League.

Hadaščok scored 9 goals in 14 matches for Vlašim in the first half of the 2018–19 Czech National Football League, prompting a move to Dukla Prague in the First League during the winter break.

He moved to FK Přepeře in the Bohemian Football League B at the start of the 2021–22 season, but left after one season as the team failed to win promotion.

=== International career ===
Hadaščok represented his country at youth international level. He was part of Czech U-19 team on 2011 UEFA EURO U-19, where Czech were runners-up.
