= Michal Breznaník =

Slovak footballer (born 1985)

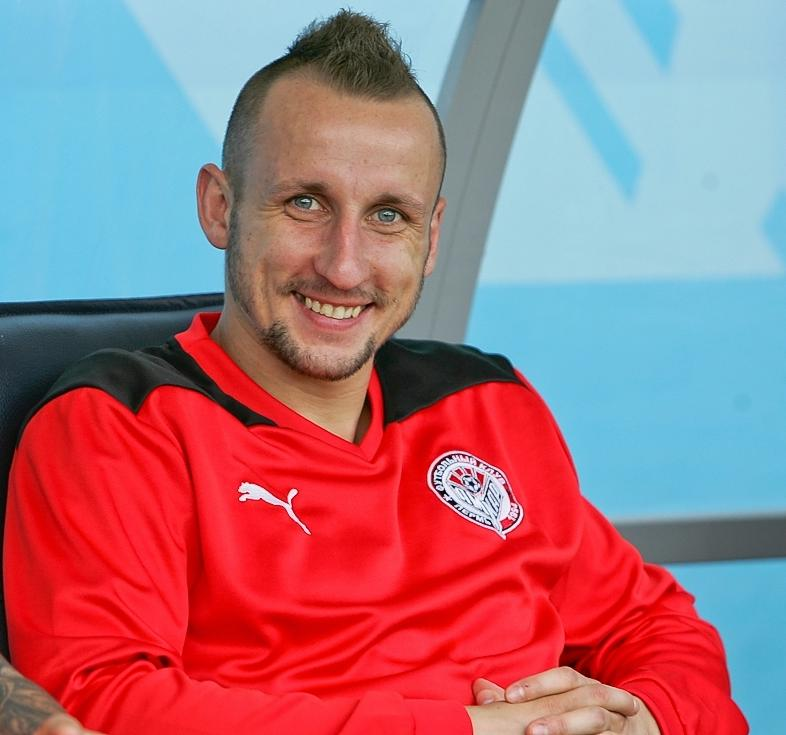
- Breznaník with Amkar Perm in 2012

Personal information
- Date of birth: 16 December 1985 (age 40)
- Place of birth: Revúca, Czechoslovakia
- Height: 1.78 m (5 ft 10 in)
- Positions: Left winger; left back

Team information
- Current team: Baník Kalinovo
- Number: 6

Youth career
- MFK Revúca
- 2001–2002: FC Junior - Radvaň
- 2002–2004: ŽP Šport Podbrezová

Senior career*
Years	Team	Apps	(Gls)
2004–2006	ŽP Šport Podbrezová		
2007–2010	Slovan Bratislava	80	(8)
2010–2012	Slovan Liberec	55	(16)
2012–2014	Amkar Perm	8	(1)
2014–2016	Sparta Prague	9	(0)
2015	→ Slovan Liberec (loan)	9	(1)
2016	→ Dukla Prague (loan)	6	(0)
2016–2022	Železiarne Podbrezová	99	(21)
2023–	Baník Kalinovo	20	(7)

International career
2012–2014	Slovakia	10	(0)
- * Club domestic league appearances and goals as of 09:38, 2 January 2024 (UTC)

Michal Breznaník (born 16 December 1985) is a Slovak football midfielder who plays for TJ Baník Kalinovo.

== Club career ==
Breznaník started his career playing in the youth teams of hometown club MFK Revúca, later FC Junior - Radvaň and was then transferred to ŽP Šport Podbrezová. In 2007, he joined Slovak side Slovan Bratislava. For the 2010–11 season, Slovan Bratislava loaned Breznaník to Slovan Liberec. After the season, Breznaník moved to Slovan Liberec permanently. On 6 September 2012, Breznaník signed three-year contract with Russian side Amkar Perm. His contract in Russia was terminated early due to a shoulder injury, with the player eventually signing as a free agent for Sparta Prague in 2014. He took part in the 2014 Czech Supercup, scoring the third goal as a substitute as Sparta defeated Viktoria Plzeň 3–0. Breznaník signed on loan for former club Slovan Liberec in the spring of 2015, and joined Dukla Prague, also on loan, in the spring of 2016.

== International career ==
Breznaník made his debut for the senior national team of his country on 29 February 2012 in the 2–1 away win over Turkey in a friendly match.

== Honours ==
ŠK Slovan Bratislava

- Corgoň Liga champion: 2008–09
- Slovak Cup winner: 2009–10

FC Slovan Liberec

- Czech First League champion: 2011–12
- Czech Cup: 2014–15

AC Sparta Prague

- Czech Supercup: 2014
