= Miloš Karišik =

Serbian footballer

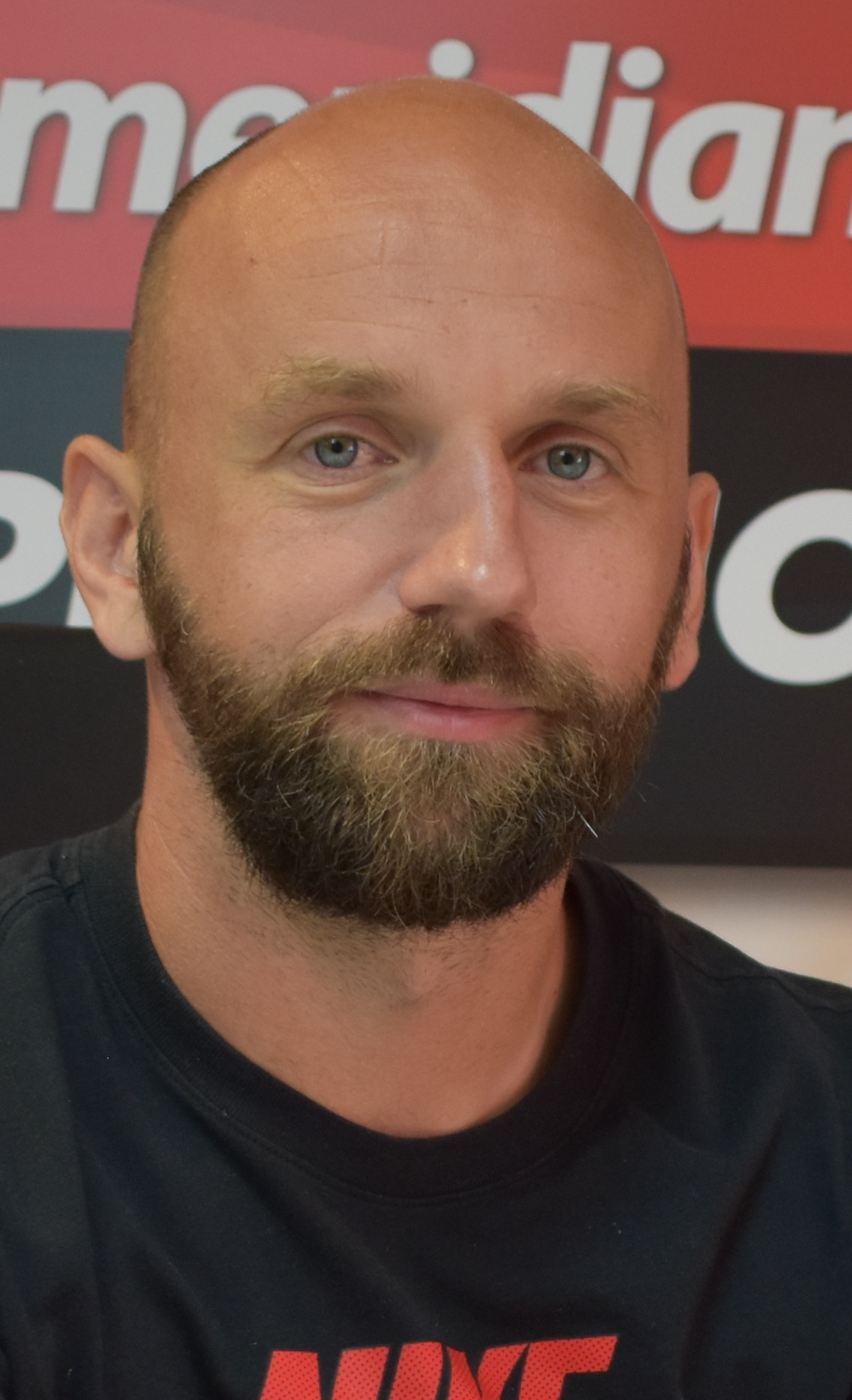
- Karišik in 2021

Personal information
- Full name: Miloš Karišik
- Date of birth: 7 October 1988 (age 38)
- Place of birth: Banatsko Novo Selo, SFR Yugoslavia
- Height: 1.84 m (6 ft 0 in)
- Position: Centre-back

Team information
- Current team: BASK

Youth career
- Partizan

Senior career*
Years	Team	Apps	(Gls)
2005–2010	Teleoptik	119	(3)
2011	Smederevo	5	(0)
2011–2016	Slovan Liberec	47	(1)
2016–2018	Javor Ivanjica	61	(3)
2018–2019	Krupa	20	(0)
2019–2020	Dinamo 1945		
2020–2021	Krupa	25	(0)
2021–2022	Sloboda Tuzla	23	(0)
2022-	BASK		

International career
2004–2005	Serbia and Montenegro U17 (Note: Only official UEFA matches included)	6	(3)
2006–2007	Serbia U19	8	(1)
- * Club domestic league appearances and goals as of 21 March 2022

Miloš Karišik (Serbian Cyrillic: Милош Каришик; born 7 October 1988) is a Serbian professional footballer who plays as a centre-back.

== Club career ==
Karišik came through the youth system at Partizan, alongside Miloš Bosančić, Nenad Marinković, and Miralem Sulejmani, among others. He made his senior debuts with affiliated side Teleoptik, making over 100 competitive appearances over the course of six seasons. In the 2011 winter transfer window, Karišik joined Serbian SuperLiga side Smederevo until the end of the campaign.

In the summer of 2011, Karišik was transferred to Czech club Slovan Liberec. He spent five seasons there, winning one Czech First League title and one Czech Cup trophy. During his stay at the club, Karišik collected 62 appearances in all competitions, failing to make any in his final season.

In July 2016, after spending five years abroad, Karišik returned to his homeland and signed with Javor Ivanjica. He then signed with Bosnian Premier League club Krupa in July 2018. Ahead of the 2019–20 season, Karišik joined Dinamo Pančevo.

On 22 July 2020, he came back to Krupa, signing a contract with the club. Karišik played his first official game since his return on 2 August 2020, a league match against Sarajevo.

== International career ==
Karišik represented Serbia at the 2007 UEFA European Under-19 Championship.

== Career statistics ==
=== Club ===
As of match played 21 March 2021.

Club	Season	League	League		Cup		Continental		Total	
Club	Season	League	Apps	Goals	Apps	Goals	Apps	Goals	Apps	Goals
Teleoptik	2010–11	Serbian First League	14	1	2	0	—		16	1
Smederevo	2010–11	Serbian SuperLiga	5	0	0	0	—		5	0
Slovan Liberec	2011–12	Czech First League	11	0	2	0	—		13	0
Slovan Liberec	2012–13	Czech First League	14	0	2	0	2	0	18	0
Slovan Liberec	2013–14	Czech First League	6	0	1	0	2	0	9	0
Slovan Liberec	2014–15	Czech First League	16	1	3	0	3	0	22	1
Slovan Liberec	2015–16	Czech First League	0	0	0	0	0	0	0	0
Slovan Liberec	Total		47	1	8	0	7	0	62	1
Javor Ivanjica	2016–17	Serbian SuperLiga	32	1	1	0	—		33	1
Javor Ivanjica	2017–18	Serbian SuperLiga	29	2	1	0	—		30	2
Javor Ivanjica	Total		61	3	2	0	—		63	3
Krupa	2018–19	Bosnian Premier League	20	0	2	0	—		22	0
Krupa	2020–21	Bosnian Premier League	18	0	1	0	—		19	0
Krupa	Total		38	0	3	0	—		42	0
Career total			165	5	15	0	7	0	187	5

== Honours ==
Slovan Liberec

- Czech First League: 2011–12
- Czech Cup: 2014–15
