= Zbyněk Hauzr =

Czech footballer

Personal information
- Full name: Zbyněk Hauzr
- Date of birth: 20 April 1973 (age 53)
- Place of birth: Liberec, Czechoslovakia
- Height: 1.89 m (6 ft 2 in)
- Position: Goalkeeper

Youth career
- FKP Turnov

Senior career*
Years	Team	Apps	(Gls)
1998–2013	Slovan Liberec	138	(0)
2001	→ České Budějovice (loan)	3	(0)
2001–2002	→ Viktoria Plzeň (loan)	42	(0)
- * Club domestic league appearances and goals as of 31 December 2010

Zbyněk Hauzr (born 20 April 1973 in Liberec) is a former Czech football goalkeeper. He ended his professional career in FC Slovan Liberec on 1 June 2013 together with his teammate Tomáš Janů.

== Coaching career ==
After retiring from professional football career, Hauzr became goalkeeper coach in FC Slovan Liberec.

== Personal life ==
In September 2014, Hauzr was charged by Czech police for participating in betting fraud organized by southeast Asian mafia. He had to partake in manipulation of three matches.
