= Tomáš Janů =

Czech footballer (born 1973)

Personal information
- Date of birth: 17 September 1973 (age 53)
- Place of birth: Příbram, Czechoslovakia
- Height: 1.74 m (5 ft 8 1/2 in)
- Position: Defender

Youth career
- 1984–1992: UD Příbram

Senior career*
Years	Team	Apps	(Gls)
1992–1993	VTJ Dukla Tábor		
1993–1996	FC Příbram	29	(2)
1996–1998	FC Dukla	60	(1)
1998–2013	FC Slovan Liberec	307	(4)
2010–2011	→ FK Ústí nad Labem (loan)	9	(0)
- * Club domestic league appearances and goals as of 21 May 2011

Tomáš Janů (born 17 September 1973 in Příbram) is a former Czech footballer. He was able to play either left back or left defensive midfielder. Janů was the longest serving player in the club of FC Slovan Liberec (over 350 starts). He was also the team captain. In summer of 2010 he moved to FK Ústí nad Labem on loan.

He ended professional career on 1 June 2013 in FC Slovan Liberec together with his teammate Zbyněk Hauzr.

== Honours ==
=== Club ===
Slovan Liberec

- Czech Cup: 1999–2000
- Gambrinus liga: 2001–02, 2005–06, 2011–12
