= Zbyněk Musiol =

Czech footballer

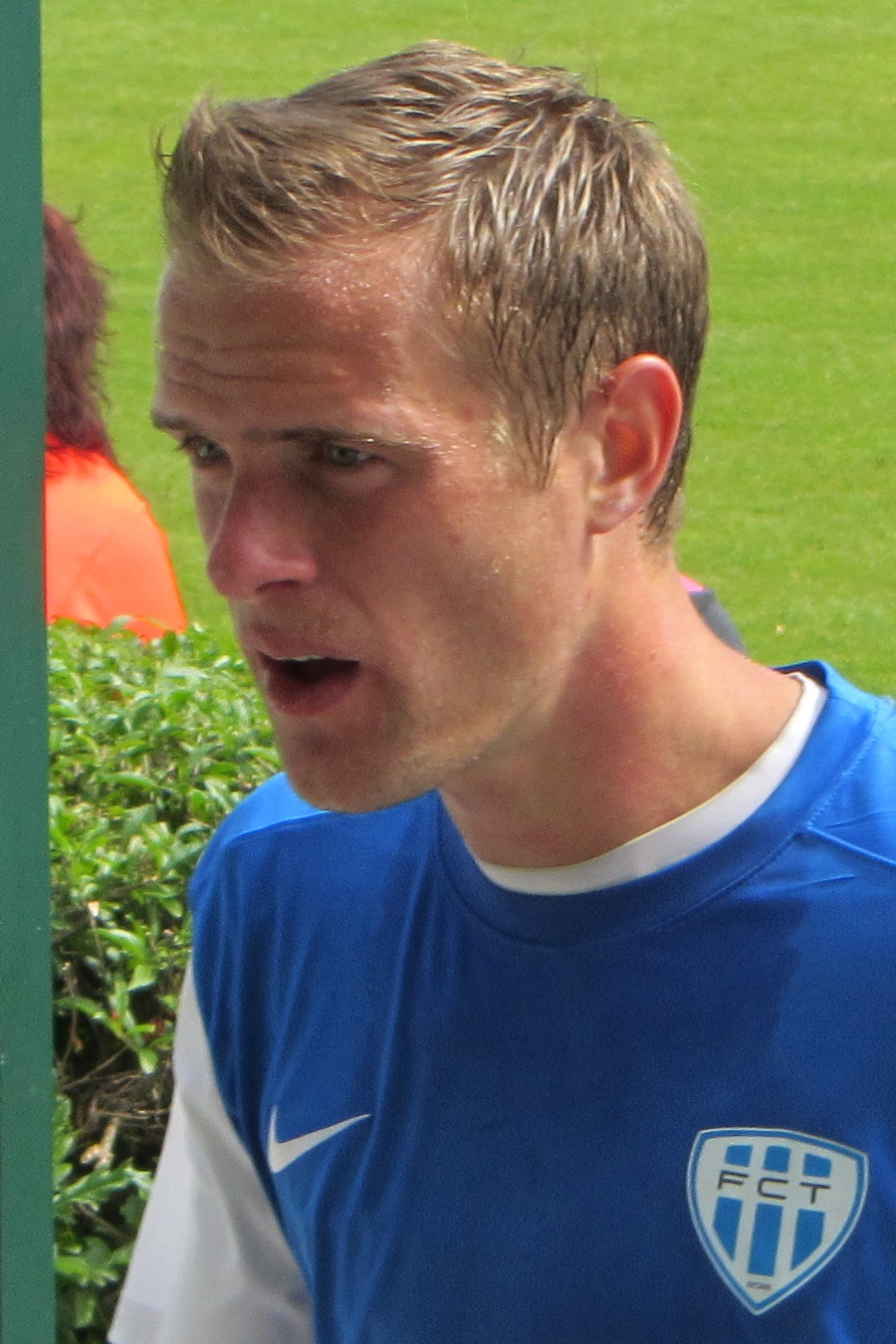
- Musiol playing for Táborsko in 2014

Personal information
- Date of birth: 1 July 1991 (age 35)
- Place of birth: Ostrava, Czechoslovakia
- Height: 1.85 m (6 ft 1 in)
- Position: Forward

Team information
- Current team: Táborsko
- Number: 13

Youth career
- Baník Ostrava

Senior career*
| Years | Team | Apps | (Gls) |
| 2010–2011 | Baník Ostrava | 0 | (0) |
| 2011–2013 | Liberec | 13 | (2) |
| 2011 | → Viktoria Žižkov (loan) | 2 | (0) |
| 2013 | → Baník Most (loan) | 9 | (0) |
| 2013–2015 | Táborsko | 47 | (11) |
| 2015–2017 | MFK Vítkovice | | |
| 2017– | Táborsko | 3 | (1) |

International career
| 2008–2009 | Czech Republic U18 | 8 | (2) |
| 2009–2010 | Czech Republic U19 | 3 | (2) |
- * Club domestic league appearances and goals as of 30 March 2017 (UTC)

Zbyněk Musiol (born 1 July 1991) is a Czech football player who currently plays for Táborsko. He has represented his country at under-19 level.
