= Pavel Ricka =

Czech footballer (born 1987)

Personal information
- Date of birth: 28 January 1987 (age 39)
- Place of birth: Czechoslovakia
- Position: Defender

Team information
- Current team: FK Viktoria Žižkov
- Number: 20

Senior career*
Years	Team	Apps	(Gls)
2006–2009	FC Baník Ostrava	2	(0)
2009–2010	FC Zenit Čáslav	24	(1)
2010–2012	1. FK Příbram	30	(1)
2012–	FK Viktoria Žižkov	3	(0)
- * Club domestic league appearances and goals as of 31 December 2012

Pavel Ricka (born 28 January 1987) is a professional Czech football player who currently plays for FK Viktoria Žižkov.
