= Tomáš Vrťo =

Czech footballer

Personal information
- Full name: Tomáš Vrťo
- Date of birth: 6 September 1988 (age 38)
- Place of birth: Ostrava, Czechoslovakia
- Height: 1.83 m (6 ft 0 in)
- Position: Forward

Senior career*
Years	Team	Apps	(Gls)
2007–2012	Baník Ostrava	20	(1)
2008	→ Fulnek (loan)	6	(0)
2009–2010	→ Senica (loan)	24	(3)
2011	→ Vlašim (loan)	13	(2)
2013	Senica	2	(0)
2013	→ Frýdek-Místek (loan)	14	(3)
2014	Energetyk ROW Rybnik	8	(0)
2014–2015	OFC Gabčíkovo	24	(4)
2015–2019	FC Mistelbach		
2019–2020	SC Neusiedl/Zaya		
- * Club domestic league appearances and goals

Tomáš Vrťo (born 6 September 1988) is a Czech former professional footballer who played as a forward.
