= Lukáš Kubáň =

Czech footballer (born 1987)

Personal information
- Full name: Lukáš Kubáň
- Date of birth: 22 June 1987 (age 39)
- Place of birth: Czechoslovakia
- Height: 1.77 m (5 ft 10 in)
- Position: Defender

Team information
- Current team: Powiśle Dzierzgoń
- Number: 21

Youth career
- 1993–1997: Sokol Stařič
- 1997–2003: VP Frýdek-Místek
- 2003–2006: 1. FC Slovácko

Senior career*
Years	Team	Apps	(Gls)
2006–2007	1. FC Slovácko	10	(0)
2007–2008	1. FC Brno	21	(0)
2008–2014	1. FC Slovácko	114	(1)
2014–2015	FK Fotbal Třinec	34	(1)
2015–2016	GKS Bełchatów	31	(0)
2016–2018	Sandecja Nowy Sącz	37	(2)
2018–2020	Stomil Olsztyn	63	(1)
2020–2022	Wisła Puławy	58	(1)
2022–2024	Stomil Olsztyn	45	(0)
2024–2025	GKS Wikielec	44	(0)
2026–	Powiśle Dzierzgoń	16	(0)

International career
2007	Czech Republic U20	11	(0)
2007	Czech Republic U21	4	(0)
Medal record
Men's football
Representing Czech Republic
FIFA U-20 World Cup
Runner-up	2007 Canada
- * Club domestic league appearances and goals as of 20:50, 27 June 2026 (UTC)

Lukáš Kubáň (born 22 June 1987) is a Czech professional footballer who plays as a defender for Polish IV liga Pomerania club Powiśle Dzierzgoń.

== Club career ==
In June 2016, Kubáň joined Sandecja Nowy Sącz.

On 11 August 2020, he signed a one-year contract with Polish fourth-tier III liga club Wisła Puławy.

On 30 June 2022, Kubáň rejoined Stomil Olsztyn, signing a one-year contract with an extension option.

== International career ==
Kubáň played at the 2007 FIFA U-20 World Cup where the Czech Republic finished second. He also represented his country at under-21 level.

== Honours ==
Sandecja Nowy Sącz

- I liga: 2016–17

Wisła Puławy

- III liga, group IV: 2020–21

GKS Wikielec

- Polish Cup (Warmia-Masuria regionals): 2024–25

Czech Republic U20

- FIFA U-20 World Cup runner-up: 2007
