= 2016–17 SK Slavia Prague season =

Slavia Prague
2016–17 season
- President: Jaroslav Tvrdík
- Head coach: Dušan Uhrin Jr. (until 29 August); Jaroslav Šilhavý (from 5 September)
- Stadium: Eden Arena
- Czech First League: 1st
- Czech Cup: Semi-final
- UEFA Europa League: Play-off round
- Top goalscorer: League: Milan Škoda (15); All: Milan Škoda (16)
| Home colours | Away colours |

The 2016–17 season was SK Slavia Prague's 24th season in the Czech First League. The team competed in Czech First League and the Czech Cup.

== Season events ==
On 6 May, Slavia gathered three points against Bohemians Prague (match-week 27), which was sufficient to be mathematically assured that the team will finish ahead of Sparta in the league table.

== Squad ==
Note: Flags indicate national team as defined under FIFA eligibility rules; some limited exceptions apply. Players may hold more than one non-FIFA nationality.

| No. | Pos. | Nation | Player |
|---|---|---|---|
| 1 | GK | CZE | Jiří Pavlenka |
| 6 | MF | CZE | Jan Sýkora |
| 8 | MF | CZE | Jaromír Zmrhal |
| 9 | MF | TKM | Ruslan Mingazow |
| 10 | MF | CZE | Josef Hušbauer |
| 11 | MF | CRO | Marko Alvir |
| 13 | DF | CMR | Michael Ngadeu-Ngadjui |
| 14 | FW | NED | Mick van Buren |
| 15 | DF | NOR | Per-Egil Flo |
| 17 | FW | CZE | Stanislav Tecl |
| 18 | DF | CZE | Jan Bořil |

| No. | Pos. | Nation | Player |
|---|---|---|---|
| 19 | DF | CIV | Simon Deli |
| 20 | DF | CZE | Jiří Bílek |
| 21 | FW | CZE | Milan Škoda |
| 23 | MF | BIH | Jasmin Šćuk |
| 24 | FW | BIH | Muris Mešanović |
| 25 | DF | CZE | Michal Frydrych |
| 26 | DF | CZE | Michael Lüftner |
| 27 | MF | CZE | Antonín Barák |
| 29 | GK | CZE | Martin Otáhal |
| 31 | GK | CZE | Přemysl Kovář |
| 81 | MF | SVK | Dušan Švento |

=== Out on loan ===
Note: Flags indicate national team as defined under FIFA eligibility rules; some limited exceptions apply. Players may hold more than one non-FIFA nationality.

| No. | Pos. | Nation | Player |
|---|---|---|---|
| 3 | DF | CZE | Jan Mikula (at Slovan Liberec) |
| 12 | GK | CZE | Martin Berkovec (at Bohemians 1905) |
| 15 | DF | CZE | Libor Holík (at Karviná) |
| 17 | MF | SVK | Jaroslav Mihalík (at Cracovia) |
| 22 | MF | CZE | Tomáš Souček (at Slovan Liberec) |
| 99 | FW | CUW | Gino van Kessel (at Lechia Gdańsk) |

| No. | Pos. | Nation | Player |
|---|---|---|---|
| — | FW | CZE | Zdeněk Linhart (at Příbram) |
| — | MF | CZE | Josef Bazal (at Příbram) |
| — | DF | CZE | Tomáš Valenta (at Dobrovice) |
| — | MF | CZE | František Mysliveček (at Ústí nad Labem) |
| — | FW | CZE | Oskar Fotr (at Varnsdorf) |

== Transfers ==
=== In ===
| Date | Position | Nationality | Name | From | Fee | Ref. |
|---|---|---|---|---|---|---|
| 5 June 2016 | MF | (Slovakia) | Dušan Švento | 1. FC Köln | Undisclosed | |
| 14 June 2016 | MF | (Turkmenistan) | Ruslan Mingazow | Jablonec | Undisclosed | |
| 14 June 2016 | FW | (Netherlands) | Mick van Buren | Esbjerg | Undisclosed | |
| 1 July 2016 | DF | (Cameroon) | Michael Ngadeu-Ngadjui | Botoșani | Undisclosed | |
| 1 July 2016 | MF | (Bosnia and Herzegovina) | Jasmin Šćuk | Mladá Boleslav | Undisclosed | |
| 13 July 2016 | FW | (Curaçao) | Gino van Kessel | Trenčín | Undisclosed | |
| 22 December 2016 | GK | (Czech Republic) | Přemysl Kovář | Cherno More | Undisclosed | |
| 28 December 2016 | DF | (Norway) | Per-Egil Flo | Molde | Undisclosed | |
| 30 December 2016 | MF | (Croatia) | Marko Alvir | Domžale | Undisclosed | |
| 1 January 2017 | DF | (Czech Republic) | Michael Lüftner | Teplice | Undisclosed | |
| 5 January 2017 | MF | (Czech Republic) | Jan Sýkora | Slovan Liberec | Undisclosed | |
| 25 January 2017 | FW | (Czech Republic) | Stanislav Tecl | Jablonec | Undisclosed | |

=== Loans in ===
| Date from | Position | Nationality | Name | From | Date to | Ref. |

=== Out ===
| Date | Position | Nationality | Name | To | Fee | Ref. |
|---|---|---|---|---|---|---|
| 23 December 2016 | MF | (Czech Republic) | Robert Hrubý | Baník Ostrava | Undisclosed | |
| 6 January 2017 | FW | (Czech Republic) | Radek Voltr | Slovan Liberec | Undisclosed | |
| 19 January 2019 | DF | (Czech Republic) | Tomáš Jablonský | Zbrojovka Brno | Undisclosed | |
| 20 January 2017 | FW | (Czech Republic) | Lukáš Železník | Mladá Boleslav | Undisclosed | |
| 1 February 2017 † | MF | (Czech Republic) | Antonín Barák | Udinese | Undisclosed | |
| 21 February 2017 | MF | (Czech Republic) | Alex Král | Teplice | Undisclosed | |

† Barák's move was announced on the above date, becoming official at the end of the season.

=== Loans out ===
| Date from | Position | Nationality | Name | To | Date to | Ref. |
|---|---|---|---|---|---|---|
| 1 July 2016 | FW | (Czech Republic) | Zdeněk Linhart | Bohemians 1905 | 31 December 2016 | |
| 3 July 2016 | MF | (Czech Republic) | Josef Bazal | Jablonec | 31 December 2016 | |
| 1 January 2017 | GK | (Czech Republic) | Martin Berkovec | Bohemians 1905 | End of Season | |
| 5 January 2017 | MF | (Slovakia) | Jaroslav Mihalík | KS Cracovia | End of Season | |
| 27 January 2017 | DF | (Czech Republic) | Jan Mikula | Slovan Liberec | End of Season | |
| 4 February 2018 | FW | (Curaçao) | Gino van Kessel | Lechia Gdańsk | End of Season | |
| 9 January 2017 | MF | (Czech Republic) | Josef Bazal | 1. FK Příbram | End of Season | |
| 9 January 2017 | FW | (Czech Republic) | Zdeněk Linhart | 1. FK Příbram | End of Season | |
| 17 February 2018 | MF | (Czech Republic) | Tomáš Souček | Slovan Liberec | End of Season | |

=== Released ===
| Date | Position | Nationality | Name | Joined | Date | Ref. |
|---|---|---|---|---|---|---|
| 11 July 2016 | DF | (Czech Republic) | Martin Latka | Slovan Liberec | | |

== Competitions ==
=== Overall record ===
| Competition | First match | Last match | Starting round | Final position | Record | | | | | | | |
| Competition | First match | Last match | Starting round | Final position | Pld | W | D | L | GF | GA | GD | Win % |
|---|---|---|---|---|---|---|---|---|---|---|---|---|
| Czech First League | 8 August 2016 | 27 May 2017 | Matchday 1 | Winners | 30 | 20 | 9 | 1 | 65 | 22 | +43 | 66.67 |
| Czech Cup | 28 September 2016 | 25 April 2017 | Third round | Semi-finals | 4 | 3 | 0 | 1 | 15 | 4 | +11 | 75.00 |
| UEFA Europa League | 14 July 2016 | 25 August 2016 | Second qualifying round | Play-off round | 7 | 1 | 3 | 3 | 4 | 10 | −6 | 14.29 |
| Total | | | | | 41 | 24 | 12 | 5 | 84 | 36 | +48 | 58.54 |

Source: Soccerway

=== Czech First League ===
==== League table ====
| Pos | Team | Pld | W | D | L | GF | GA | GD | Pts | Qualification or relegation |
|---|---|---|---|---|---|---|---|---|---|---|
| 1 | Slavia Prague (C) | 30 | 20 | 9 | 1 | 65 | 22 | +43 | 69 | Qualification for the Champions League third qualifying round |
| 2 | Viktoria Plzeň | 30 | 20 | 7 | 3 | 47 | 21 | +26 | 67 | Qualification for the Champions League third qualifying round |
| 3 | Sparta Prague | 30 | 16 | 9 | 5 | 47 | 26 | +21 | 57 | Qualification for the Europa League third qualifying round |
| 4 | Mladá Boleslav | 30 | 13 | 10 | 7 | 47 | 37 | +10 | 49 | Qualification for the Europa League second qualifying round |
| 5 | Teplice | 30 | 13 | 9 | 8 | 38 | 25 | +13 | 48 | |

Source: Fortuna liga, Soccerway
Rules for classification: 1) Points; 2) Head-to-head points; 3) Head-to-head goal difference; 4) Head-to-head goals scored; 5) Goal difference; 6) Goals scored; 7) Play-off (only if deciding champion, UEFA competitions, or relegation); 8) Draw.
(C) Champions

==== Results summary ====
| Overall | | | | | | | | Home | | | | | | Away | | | | | |
| Pld | W | D | L | GF | GA | GD | Pts | W | D | L | GF | GA | GD | W | D | L | GF | GA | GD |
|---|---|---|---|---|---|---|---|---|---|---|---|---|---|---|---|---|---|---|---|
| 30 | 20 | 9 | 1 | 65 | 22 | +43 | 69 | 10 | 5 | 0 | 28 | 9 | +19 | 10 | 4 | 1 | 37 | 13 | +24 |

Source: See results

==== Results by round ====
| Round | 1 | 2 | 3 | 4 | 5 | 6 | 7 | 8 | 9 | 10 | 11 | 12 | 13 | 14 | 15 | 16 | 17 | 18 | 19 | 20 | 21 | 22 | 23 | 24 | 25 | 26 | 27 | 28 | 29 | 30 |
|---|---|---|---|---|---|---|---|---|---|---|---|---|---|---|---|---|---|---|---|---|---|---|---|---|---|---|---|---|---|---|
| Ground | H | A | H | A | A | H | A | H | A | A | H | A | H | A | H | A | H | A | H | H | A | H | A | H | A | H | A | H | A | H |
| Result | D | D | W | L | D | W | W | W | W | W | W | D | D | W | W | W | W | W | W | W | D | D | W | W | W | D | W | D | W | W |
| Position | 8 | 10 | 8 | 10 | 10 | 7 | 5 | 5 | 5 | 3 | 3 | 3 | 3 | 3 | 2 | 2 | 2 | 1 | 1 | 1 | 2 | 2 | 2 | 2 | 1 | 1 | 1 | 1 | 1 | 1 |

Source: See results
A = Away; H = Home; W = Win; D = Draw; L = Loss

==== Matches ====
| 8 August 2016 2 | Slavia Prague | 2–2 | Fastav Zlín | Prague |
| 18:00 CEST (UTC+02:00) | van Kessel 71'; Mešanović 90+5' | Report | Poznar 18'; Živulić (yellow card) 21'; Štípek (yellow card) 29'; Holík 30' (yellow card) 90'; Matejov (yellow card) 33'; Dostál (yellow card) 86' | Stadium: Eden Aréna; Attendance: 7,702; Referee: Jiří Houdek |

| 14 August 2016 3 | Vysočina Jihlava | 1–1 | Slavia Prague | Jihlava |
| 19:30 CEST (UTC+02:00) | Ikaunieks 7' | Report | Ngadeu-Ngadjui (yellow card) 26' van Kessel 51' | Stadium: Stadion v Jiráskově ulici Attendance: 4,500; Referee: Jan Jilek |

| 21 August 2016 4 | Slavia Prague | 3–0 | 1. FK Příbram | Prague |
| 15:00 CEST (UTC+02:00) | Frydrych (yellow card) 38'; Hušbauer (yellow card) 40' (goal) 90'; Mešanović 45'; Škoda 65' | Report | Trapp (yellow card) 18'; J.Divíšek (yellow card) 55' | Stadium: Eden Aréna; Attendance: 5,043; Referee: Zbynek Proske |

| 28 August 2016 5 | Viktoria Plzeň | 3–1 | Slavia Prague | Plzeň |
| 19:30 CEST (UTC+02:00) | Petržela 48'; Hejda 65'; Hořava (yellow card) 69'; Krmenčík 85' | Report | Bílek 13' van Kessel (yellow card) 51'; Ngadeu-Ngadjui (yellow card) 58' | Stadium: Doosan Arena; Attendance: 11,317; Referee: Petr Ardeleánu |

| 11 September 2016 6 | Teplice | 2–2 | Slavia Prague | Teplice |
| 18:15 CEST (UTC+02:00) | Vondrášek 43'; Krob (yellow card) 63'; Vachoušek (yellow card) 80'; Vaněček 88' | Report | van Kessel (yellow card) 50'; Mešanović 73'; Mihalík 85' | Stadium: Na Stínadlech; Attendance: 7,113; Referee: Pavel Kralovec |

| 19 September 2016 7 | Slavia Prague | 1–0 | Slovan Liberec | Prague |
| 18:30 CEST (UTC+02:00) | Mingazow (yellow card) 2'; Škoda 60' | Report | | Stadium: Eden Aréna; Attendance: 6,882; Referee: Karel Hrubes |

| 25 September 2016 8 | Sparta Prague | 0–2 | Slavia Prague | Prague |
| 15:30 CEST (UTC+02:00) | Nhamoinesu (yellow card) 32'; Kadlec (yellow card) 60'; Lafata (yellow card) 83'; Frýdek (yellow card) 90'; Čermák (yellow card) 90' | Report | Mešanović 62'; Zmrhal 78' | Stadium: Generali Arena; Attendance: 18,397; Referee: Radek Prihoda |

| 1 October 2016 9 | Slavia Prague | 1–0 | Karviná | Prague |
| 20:05 CEST (UTC+02:00) | Barák (yellow card) 31'; Frydrych (yellow card) 62'; Mešanović 77' | Report | Košťál (yellow card) 68' | Stadium: Eden Aréna; Attendance: 6,513; Referee: Jan Machálek |

| 15 October 2016 10 | Hradec Králové | 0–3 | Slavia Prague | Hradec Králové |
| 15:00 CEST (UTC+02:00) | P.Schwarz (yellow card) 9'; Holeš (yellow card) 83' | Report | Škoda 24'; Ngadeu-Ngadjui (yellow card) 71'; Zmrhal 73'; Barák 75' | Stadium: Všesportovní stadion Attendance: 4,561; Referee: Pavel Julínek |

| 19 October 2016 1 | Zbrojovka Brno | 1–4 | Slavia Prague | Brno |
| 18:00 CEST (UTC+02:00) | Přichystal 26' | Report | Barák 9', 47'; Frydrych 59'; Škoda 66' | Stadium: Městský fotbalový stadion Srbská; Attendance: 8,818; Referee: Pavel Franek |
Note: Match originally scheduled for 31 July 2016, but postponed due to heavy rain.

| 22 October 2016 11 | Slavia Prague | 1–0 | Slovácko | Prague |
| 20:05 CEST (UTC+02:00) | Zmrhal 56' | Report | Břečka (yellow card) 43'; Kerbr (yellow card) 77'; Chvátal (yellow card) 82' | Stadium: Eden Aréna; Attendance: 7,108; Referee: Petr Ardeleánu |

| 30 October 2016 12 | Jablonec | 0–0 | Slavia Prague | Jablonec nad Nisou |
| 15:00 CET (UTC+01:00) | Mihálik (yellow card) 40' | Report | Bílek (yellow card) 26'; Bořil (yellow card) 51' | Stadium: Stadion Střelnice; Attendance: 4255; Referee: Zbynek Proske |

| 5 November 2016 13 | Slavia Prague | 1–1 | Bohemians 1905 | Prague |
| 20:05 CET (UTC+01:00) | Škoda 13'; Barák (yellow card) 45'; Bořil (yellow card) 86' | Report | Šmíd 4'; Luts (yellow card) 27'; Jirásek (yellow card) 35'; Hašek (yellow card) 42' | Stadium: Eden Aréna; Attendance: 11,753; Referee: Jan Jilek |

| 18 November 2016 14 | Dukla Prague | 1–2 | Slavia Prague | Prague |
| 20:15 CET (UTC+01:00) | Kušnír (yellow card) 27'; Čajić 45'; Tetour (yellow card) 62'; Považanec (yellow card) 83' | Report | Hušbauer (yellow card) 48'; Mešanović 53'; Škoda 63'; Bořil (yellow card) 82' | Stadium: Stadion Juliska; Attendance: 5,273; Referee: Pavel Kralovec |

| 26 November 2016 15 | Slavia Prague | 2–1 | Mladá Boleslav | Prague |
| 15:00 CET (UTC+01:00) | Ngadeu-Ngadjui 35'; Mešanović (yellow card) 55'; Zmrhal 71' | Report | Fleišman (yellow card) 41'; Matějovský (yellow card) 63' (yellow-red card) 79'; Mebrahtu (yellow card) 74'; Magera (yellow card) 83' (goal) 86' (pen.) | Stadium: Eden Aréna; Attendance: 10,074; Referee: Radek Prihoda |

| 2 December 2016 16 | Fastav Zlín | 0–4 | Slavia Prague | Zlín |
| 20:15 CET (UTC+01:00) | Matejov (yellow card) 45'; Fantiš (yellow card) 75' | Report | Škoda 8' (pen.), 37'; Ngadeu-Ngadjui (yellow card) 41'; Mešanović 42'; Zmrhal 81' | Stadium: Letná Stadion; Attendance: 4,304; Referee: Karel Hrubes |

| 18 February 2017 17 | Slavia Prague | 2–0 | Vysočina Jihlava | Prague |
| 16:30 CET (UTC+01:00) | Škoda 29', 50' (pen.); Šćuk (yellow card) 90+2' | Report | Batioja (yellow card) 36'; Štěpánek (yellow card) 50'; Kryštůfek (yellow card) 87' | Stadium: Eden Aréna; Attendance: 14,116; Referee: Miroslav Zelinka |

| 25 February 2017 18 | 1. FK Příbram | 1–8 | Slavia Prague | Příbram |
| 19:15 CET (UTC+01:00) | Ayong (yellow card) 34'; Rezek (yellow card) 39'; Květ (yellow card) 40'; Divíšek 59'; Lupták (yellow card) 79'; Hruška (yellow card) 86' | Report | Škoda 8'; Sýkora (yellow card) 17'; Hušbauer 29'; Ngadeu-Ngadjui 55', 73', 81' (pen.); Mešanović 61'; Bořil 82' | Stadium: Na Litavce; Attendance: 5,962; Referee: Pavel Julínek |

| 5 March 2017 19 | Slavia Prague | 1–0 | Viktoria Plzeň | Prague |
| 16:00 CET (UTC+01:00) | Hušbauer (yellow card) 80'; Frydrych 88'; Sýkora (yellow card) 90+1' | Report | Řezník (yellow card) 45' (yellow-red card) 71'; Hořava (yellow card) 55'; Limberský (yellow card) 60'; Bakoš (yellow card) 75'; Zeman (yellow card) 78' | Stadium: Eden Aréna; Attendance: 19,084; Referee: Radek Prihoda |

| 12 March 2017 20 | Slavia Prague | 2–1 | Teplice | Prague |
| 17:30 CET (UTC+01:00) | Flo (yellow card) 16'; Škoda 25' van Buren (yellow card) 74'; Vaněček 87' (o.g.) | Report | Kučera (yellow card) 18'; Susnjar (yellow card) 27'; Fillo 30' (yellow card) 75'; Vošahlík (yellow card) 32' | Stadium: Eden Aréna; Attendance: 15,081; Referee: Zbynek Proske |

| 18 March 2017 21 | Slovan Liberec | 1–1 | Slavia Prague | Liberec |
| 16:30 CET (UTC+01:00) | Moses 40'; Ševčík (yellow card) 59'; Potočný (yellow card) 73'; Dúbravka (yellow card) 90'; Bosančić (red card) 90' | Report | Zmrhal 15' (yellow card) 75'; Bořil (yellow card) 59'; Sýkora (yellow card) 89' | Stadium: Stadion u Nisy; Attendance: 8,880; Referee: Petr Ardeleánu |

| 2 April 2017 22 | Slavia Prague | 1–1 | Sparta Prague | Prague |
| 17:30 CEST (UTC+02:00) | Hušbauer (yellow card) 68'; Škoda 90+1' (pen.) | Report | Vácha (yellow card) 70'; Lafata (yellow card) 70'; Šural (yellow card) 74'; Kadlec 81'; Pulkrab (yellow card) 82' | Stadium: Eden Aréna; Attendance: 19,084; Referee: Pavel Franek |

| 8 April 2017 23 | Karviná | 1–2 | Slavia Prague | Karviná |
| 20:15 CEST (UTC+02:00) | Jovanović (yellow card) 14'; Wágner 36' (pen.); Eismann (yellow card) 58'; Košťál (yellow card) 79' | Report | Mešanović 12', 80'; Šćuk (yellow card) 75'; Pavlenka (yellow card) 90+1'; Barák (yellow card) 90+3'; Mingazow (yellow card) 90+5' | Stadium: Městský stadion Attendance: 4,830; Referee: Pavel Orel |

| 17 April 2017 24 | Slavia Prague | 4–0 | Hradec Králové | Prague |
| 17:30 CEST (UTC+02:00) | Frydrych 6'; Škoda 23' (pen.); Mingazow 40'; Barák (yellow card) 59'; Hušbauer 74' | Report | Martan (yellow card) 21' | Stadium: Eden Aréna; Attendance: 9,786; Referee: Jan Jilek |

| 21 April 2017 25 | Slovácko | 0–2 | Slavia Prague | Uherské Hradiště |
| 20:15 CEST (UTC+02:00) | Daníček (yellow card) 78' | Report | Škoda 30'; Ngadeu-Ngadjui (yellow card) 55'; Frydrych (yellow card) 62'; Deli 83' | Stadium: Městský fotbalový stadion Miroslava Valenty; Attendance: 5,648; Referee: Pavel Kralovec |

| 30 April 2017 26 | Slavia Prague | 1–1 | Jablonec | Prague |
| 17:30 CEST (UTC+02:00) | Šćuk (yellow card) 14'; Hušbauer (yellow card) 78'; Mešanović 90' | Report | Lüftner 73' (o.g.); Hrubý (yellow card) 77'; Kubista (yellow card) 85' | Stadium: Eden Aréna; Attendance: 15,873; Referee: Miroslav Zelinka |

| 6 May 2017 27 | Bohemians 1905 | 1–3 | Slavia Prague | Prague |
| 19:00 CEST (UTC+02:00) | Marković 16' (pen.); Šmíd (yellow card) 66' | Report | Mingazow 12' (yellow card) 28'; Škoda (yellow card) 17'; Mešanović (yellow card) 17'; Zmrhal 50'; Sýkora 82' | Stadium: Ďolíček; Attendance: 5,000; Referee: Pavel Orel |

| 13 May 2017 28 | Slavia Prague | 2–2 | Dukla Prague | Prague |
| 18:45 CEST (UTC+02:00) | Mešanović 16'; Barák (yellow card) 29' (goal) 69' (pen.); Hušbauer (yellow card) 31'; Ngadeu-Ngadjui (yellow card) 39' | Report | Šimůnek (yellow card) 16'; Koreš 30'; Juroška (yellow card) 65'; Štetina (yellow card) 69'; Edmond 80' | Stadium: Eden Aréna; Attendance: 13,974; Referee: Radek Prihoda |

| 20 May 2017 29 | Mladá Boleslav | 1–2 | Slavia Prague | Mladá Boleslav |
| 17:00 CEST (UTC+02:00) | Chramosta 88' | Report | Ngadeu-Ngadjui 11'; Lüftner (yellow card) 70'; Mingazow 85' | Stadium: Městský stadion Attendance: 5,000; Referee: Miroslav Zelinka |

| 27 May 2017 30 | Slavia Prague | 4–0 | Zbrojovka Brno | Prague |
| 17:00 CEST (UTC+02:00) | Frydrych 27'; Tecl 30', 58'; Škoda (yellow card) 45+5'; Flo (yellow card) 62'; Ngadeu-Ngadjui 68' | Report | | Stadium: Eden Aréna; Attendance: 12,300; Referee: Zbynek Proske |

=== Czech Cup ===
| 28 September 2016 Third round | Chrudim | 1–3 | Slavia Prague | Chrudim |
| 15:00 CEST (UTC+02:00) | S.Langr (yellow card) 23' (yellow-red card) 70'; L.Kopecký 68' (pen.) | Report | Barák 45'; Mihalík 72' (pen.); Bořil (yellow card) 79' van Buren 90' | Stadium: Za Vodojemem; Attendance: 3,450; Referee: Pavel Franěk |

| 26 October 2016 Fourth round | Slavia Prague | 7–0 | Litoměřice | Prague |
| 18:30 CEST (UTC+02:00) | Mešanović 11', 12', 20'; Mingazow 41' van Kessel 62'; Železník 70' van Buren 89' | Report | J.Grunert (yellow card) 75'; F.Suchý (yellow card) 82' | Stadium: Eden Arena; Attendance: 3,237; Referee: Jana Adamkova |

| 12 April 2017 Quarter-finals | Slavia Prague | 5–2 | MFK Karviná | Prague |
| 18:45 CEST (UTC+02:00) | Frydrych 25'; Šćuk 38'; Mingazow 49' (yellow card) 68'; Tecl 63'; Bořil 68' | Report | Wágner 34' (yellow card) 36'; Lüftner (54.); Budínský (yellow card) 68' | Stadium: Eden Arena; Attendance: 4,438; Referee: Ondřej Berka |

| 25 April 2017 Semi-finals | Slavia Prague | 0–1 | Fastav Zlín | Prague |
| 20:15 CEST (UTC+02:00) | | Report | Holík 32' (yellow card) 86'; Z.Gajić (yellow card) 49'; J.Hnaníček (yellow card) 89'; Dostál (yellow card) 90+1' | Stadium: Eden Arena; Attendance: 5,012; Referee: Jan Machálek |

=== UEFA Europa League ===
==== Qualifying rounds ====
===== Second qualifying round =====
| 14 July 2016 First leg | Levadia Tallinn (Estonia) | 3–1 | (Czech Republic) Slavia Prague | Tallinn, Estonia |
| 18:00 CEST (UTC+02:00) | Hunt 35'; Gando 67'; Antonov 90' (yellow card) 90+4' | Report | Mingazow 63'; Hušbauer (yellow card) 79' | Stadium: Kadriorg Stadium; Attendance: 2,750; Referee: Neil Doyle (Republic of Ireland) |

| 21 July 2016 Second leg | Slavia Prague (Czech Republic) | 2–0 (a 3–3 agg.) | (Estonia) Levadia Tallinn | Prague, Czech Republic |
| 19:00 CEST (UTC+02:00) | Škoda 10' (yellow card) 87'; Van Kessel (yellow card) 59' (goal) 67' | Report | L.Manga (yellow card) 29'; Antonov (yellow card) 46'; Gatagov (yellow card) 88' | Stadium: Eden Arena; Attendance: 14,856; Referee: Christos Nicolaides (Cyprus) |

===== Third qualifying round =====
| 28 July 2016 First leg | Slavia Prague (Czech Republic) | 0–0 | (Portugal) Rio Ave | Prague, Czech Republic |
| 19:00 CEST (UTC+02:00) | Hušbauer (yellow card) 37'; Souček (yellow card) 88'; Bořil (yellow card) 90' | Report | Tarantini (yellow card) 90+1' | Stadium: Eden Arena; Attendance: 15,082; Referee: Sergey Lapochkin (Russia) |

| 4 August 2016 Second leg | Rio Ave (Portugal) | 1–1 (a 1–1 agg.) | (Czech Republic) Slavia Prague | Vila do Conde, Portugal |
| 21:00 CEST (UTC+02:00) | Cassamá (yellow card) 28' (yellow-red card) 45+1'; Ribeiro (yellow card) 42' (goal) 57'; Vilas Boas (yellow card) 45+3'; Tarantini (yellow card) 67'; Roderick (yellow card) 73' | Report | Mikula (yellow card) 10'; Hušbauer 22' (yellow card) 75'; Deli (yellow card) 40' | Stadium: Estádio dos Arcos; Attendance: 6,081; Referee: Andrew Dallas (Scotland) |

===== Play-off round =====
| 18 August 2016 First leg | Slavia Prague (Czech Republic) | 0–3 | (Belgium) Anderlecht | Prague, Czech Republic |
| 19:00 CEST (UTC+02:00) | Mešanović (yellow card) 79' | Report | Sylla 49'; Teodorczyk 60'; Hanni 71' | Stadium: Eden Arena; Attendance: 16,096; Referee: Martin Strömbergsson (Sweden) |

| 25 August 2016 Second leg | Anderlecht (Belgium) | 3–0 (6–0 agg.) | (Czech Republic) Slavia Prague | Anderlecht, Belgium |
| 20:00 CEST (UTC+02:00) | Tielemans 22' (pen.); Teodorczyk 40' (pen.); Heylen 61'; Chipciu (yellow card) 79'; Sylla (yellow card) 81' | Report | Mikula (yellow card) 16'; Ngadeu-Ngadjui (yellow card) 22' | Stadium: Constant Vanden Stock Stadium; Attendance: 13,075; Referee: Anthony Taylor (England) |

== Squad statistics ==
As of match played 27 May 2017

=== Appearances and goals ===
| No. | Pos | Nat | Player | Total | | HET liga | | MOL Cup | | Europa League | |
| No. | Pos | Nat | Player | Apps | Goals | Apps | Goals | Apps | Goals | Apps | Goals |
|---|---|---|---|---|---|---|---|---|---|---|---|
| 1 | GK | (Czech Republic) CZE | Jiří Pavlenka | 33 | 0 | 28 | 0 | 1 | 0 | 4 | 0 |
| 6 | MF | (Czech Republic) CZE | Jan Sýkora | 13 | 2 | 10+1 | 2 | 0+1 | 0 | 1 | 0 |
| 8 | MF | (Czech Republic) CZE | Jaromír Zmrhal | 39 | 8 | 27+3 | 7 | 2+2 | 1 | 4+1 | 0 |
| 9 | MF | (Turkmenistan) TKM | Ruslan Mingazow | 21 | 5 | 8+8 | 3 | 2+1 | 2 | 1+1 | 0 |
| 10 | MF | (Czech Republic) CZE | Josef Hušbauer | 37 | 4 | 29 | 3 | 2+1 | 0 | 5 | 1 |
| 13 | DF | (Cameroon) CMR | Michael Ngadeu-Ngadjui | 36 | 6 | 26+1 | 6 | 4 | 0 | 4+1 | 0 |
| 14 | FW | (Netherlands) NED | Mick van Buren | 15 | 2 | 10 | 0 | 0+3 | 2 | 0+2 | 0 |
| 15 | DF | (Norway) NOR | Per-Egil Flo | 12 | 0 | 10+1 | 0 | 1 | 0 | 0 | 0 |
| 17 | FW | (Czech Republic) CZE | Stanislav Tecl | 13 | 3 | 3+8 | 2 | 2 | 1 | 0 | 0 |
| 18 | DF | (Czech Republic) CZE | Jan Bořil | 32 | 2 | 22+2 | 1 | 3 | 1 | 5 | 0 |
| 19 | DF | (Ivory Coast) CIV | Simon Deli | 31 | 1 | 25 | 1 | 1 | 0 | 5 | 0 |
| 20 | DF | (Czech Republic) CZE | Jiří Bílek | 23 | 1 | 16+1 | 1 | 1 | 0 | 4+1 | 0 |
| 21 | FW | (Czech Republic) CZE | Milan Škoda | 34 | 16 | 27+2 | 15 | 0+1 | 0 | 4 | 1 |
| 23 | MF | (Bosnia and Herzegovina) BIH | Jasmin Šćuk | 22 | 1 | 4+13 | 0 | 3 | 1 | 0+2 | 0 |
| 24 | FW | (Bosnia and Herzegovina) BIH | Muris Mešanović | 33 | 16 | 11+15 | 12 | 4 | 3 | 2+1 | 1 |
| 25 | DF | (Czech Republic) CZE | Michal Frydrych | 30 | 5 | 24+1 | 4 | 3 | 1 | 1+1 | 0 |
| 26 | DF | (Czech Republic) CZE | Michael Lüftner | 16 | 0 | 14 | 0 | 2 | 0 | 0 | 0 |
| 27 | MF | (Czech Republic) CZE | Antonín Barák | 33 | 5 | 18+7 | 4 | 2+1 | 1 | 3+2 | 0 |
| 31 | GK | (Czech Republic) CZE | Přemysl Kovář | 2 | 0 | 0 | 0 | 2 | 0 | 0 | 0 |
| 81 | DF | (Slovakia) SVK | Dušan Švento | 14 | 0 | 7+5 | 0 | 0+1 | 0 | 1 | 0 |
Players away from Slavia Prague on loan:
| 3 | DF | (Czech Republic) CZE | Jan Mikula | 11 | 0 | 4 | 0 | 2 | 0 | 5 | 0 |
| 12 | GK | (Czech Republic) CZE | Martin Berkovec | 5 | 0 | 2 | 0 | 1 | 0 | 2 | 0 |
| 15 | DF | (Czech Republic) CZE | Libor Holík | 1 | 0 | 0 | 0 | 0 | 0 | 1 | 0 |
| 17 | MF | (Slovakia) SVK | Jaroslav Mihalík | 16 | 2 | 4+5 | 1 | 2 | 1 | 1+4 | 0 |
| 22 | MF | (Czech Republic) CZE | Tomáš Souček | 13 | 0 | 5+2 | 0 | 1 | 0 | 5 | 0 |
| 99 | FW | (Curaçao) CUW | Gino van Kessel | 14 | 4 | 5+2 | 2 | 2 | 1 | 5 | 1 |
Players who left Slavia Prague during the season:
| 2 | FW | (Czech Republic) CZE | Lukáš Železník | 2 | 0 | 0+1 | 0 | 0+1 | 0 | 0 | 0 |
| 6 | DF | (Czech Republic) CZE | Tomáš Jablonský | 1 | 0 | 0 | 0 | 1 | 0 | 0 | 0 |
| 11 | MF | (Georgia (country)) GEO | Levan Kenia | 5 | 0 | 1 | 0 | 0 | 0 | 3+1 | 0 |

=== Goal scorers ===
| Place | Position | Nation | Number | Name | HET liga | MOL Cup | Europa League | Total |
|---|---|---|---|---|---|---|---|---|
| 1 | FW | (Czech Republic) | 21 | Milan Škoda | 15 | 0 | 1 | 16 |
| 2 | FW | (Bosnia and Herzegovina) | 24 | Muris Mešanović | 12 | 3 | 0 | 15 |
| 3 | MF | (Czech Republic) | 8 | Jaromír Zmrhal | 7 | 0 | 0 | 7 |
| 4 | MF | (Cameroon) | 13 | Michael Ngadeu-Ngadjui | 6 | 0 | 0 | 6 |
| 4 | MF | (Turkmenistan) | 9 | Ruslan Mingazow | 3 | 2 | 1 | 6 |
| 6 | MF | (Czech Republic) | 27 | Antonín Barák | 4 | 1 | 0 | 5 |
| 6 | DF | (Czech Republic) | 25 | Michal Frydrych | 4 | 1 | 0 | 5 |
| 8 | MF | (Czech Republic) | 10 | Josef Hušbauer | 3 | 0 | 1 | 4 |
| 8 | FW | (Curaçao) | 99 | Gino van Kessel | 2 | 1 | 1 | 4 |
| 10 | FW | (Czech Republic) | 17 | Stanislav Tecl | 2 | 1 | 0 | 3 |
| 11 | MF | (Czech Republic) | 6 | Jan Sýkora | 2 | 0 | 0 | 2 |
| 11 | MF | (Slovakia) | 17 | Jaroslav Mihalík | 1 | 1 | 0 | 2 |
| 11 | DF | (Czech Republic) | 18 | Jan Bořil | 1 | 1 | 0 | 2 |
| 11 | FW | (Netherlands) | 14 | Mick van Buren | 0 | 2 | 0 | 2 |
| 15 | DF | (Ivory Coast) | 19 | Simon Deli | 1 | 0 | 0 | 1 |
| 15 | DF | (Czech Republic) | 20 | Jiří Bílek | 1 | 0 | 0 | 1 |
| 15 | FW | (Czech Republic) | 2 | Lukáš Železník | 0 | 1 | 0 | 1 |
| 15 | MF | (Bosnia and Herzegovina) | 23 | Jasmin Šćuk | 0 | 1 | 0 | 1 |
| 15 | | | | Own goal | 0 | 1 | 0 | 1 |
| | | | | TOTALS | 65 | 15 | 4 | 84 |

=== Clean sheets ===
| Place | Position | Nation | Number | Name | HET liga | MOL Cup | Europa League | Total |
|---|---|---|---|---|---|---|---|---|
| 1 | GK | (Czech Republic) | 1 | Jiří Pavlenka | 12 | 0 | 2 | 14 |
| 2 | GK | (Czech Republic) | 12 | Martin Berkovec | 1 | 1 | 0 | 2 |
| | | | | TOTALS | 13 | 1 | 2 | 16 |

=== Disciplinary record ===
| Number | Nation | Position | Name | HET liga | | MOL Cup | | Europa League | | Total | |
| Number | Nation | Position | Name | Yellow card | Red card | Yellow card | Red card | Yellow card | Red card | Yellow card | Red card |
| 1 | (Czech Republic) | GK | Jiří Pavlenka | 1 | 0 | 0 | 0 | 0 | 0 | 1 | 0 |
| 6 | (Czech Republic) | MF | Jan Sýkora | 2 | 0 | 0 | 0 | 0 | 0 | 2 | 0 |
| 8 | (Czech Republic) | MF | Jaromír Zmrhal | 1 | 0 | 0 | 0 | 0 | 0 | 1 | 0 |
| 9 | (Turkmenistan) | MF | Ruslan Mingazow | 3 | 0 | 1 | 0 | 0 | 0 | 4 | 0 |
| 10 | (Czech Republic) | MF | Josef Hušbauer | 6 | 0 | 0 | 0 | 3 | 0 | 9 | 0 |
| 13 | (Cameroon) | DF | Michael Ngadeu-Ngadjui | 6 | 0 | 0 | 0 | 0 | 0 | 6 | 0 |
| 14 | (Netherlands) | FW | Mick van Buren | 1 | 0 | 0 | 0 | 0 | 0 | 1 | 0 |
| 15 | (Norway) | DF | Per-Egil Flo | 2 | 0 | 0 | 0 | 0 | 0 | 2 | 0 |
| 18 | (Czech Republic) | DF | Jan Bořil | 4 | 0 | 1 | 0 | 1 | 0 | 6 | 0 |
| 19 | (Ivory Coast) | DF | Simon Deli | 0 | 0 | 0 | 0 | 1 | 0 | 1 | 0 |
| 20 | (Czech Republic) | DF | Jiří Bílek | 1 | 0 | 0 | 0 | 0 | 0 | 1 | 0 |
| 21 | (Czech Republic) | FW | Milan Škoda | 2 | 0 | 0 | 0 | 1 | 0 | 3 | 0 |
| 23 | (Bosnia and Herzegovina) | MF | Jasmin Šćuk | 3 | 0 | 0 | 0 | 0 | 0 | 3 | 0 |
| 24 | (Bosnia and Herzegovina) | FW | Muris Mešanović | 2 | 0 | 0 | 0 | 1 | 0 | 3 | 0 |
| 25 | (Czech Republic) | DF | Michal Frydrych | 3 | 0 | 0 | 0 | 0 | 0 | 3 | 0 |
| 26 | (Czech Republic) | DF | Michael Lüftner | 1 | 0 | 0 | 0 | 0 | 0 | 1 | 0 |
| 27 | (Czech Republic) | MF | Antonín Barák | 5 | 0 | 0 | 0 | 0 | 0 | 5 | 0 |
Players away on loan:
| 3 | (Czech Republic) | DF | Jan Mikula | 0 | 0 | 0 | 0 | 1 | 0 | 1 | 0 |
| 22 | (Czech Republic) | MF | Tomáš Souček | 0 | 0 | 0 | 0 | 1 | 0 | 1 | 0 |
| 99 | (Curaçao) | FW | Gino van Kessel | 2 | 0 | 0 | 0 | 1 | 0 | 3 | 0 |
Players who left Slavia Prague during the season:
| | | | TOTALS | 45 | 0 | 2 | 0 | 10 | 0 | 57 | 0 |
