= 2015–16 SK Slavia Prague season =

Slavia Prague
2015–16 season
- President: Jaroslav Tvrdík
- Head coach: Dušan Uhrin Jr.
- Stadium: Eden Arena
- Czech First League: 5th
- Czech Cup: Third round
- Top goalscorer: League: Milan Škoda (14); All: Milan Škoda (15)
Home colours	Away colours

The 2015–16 season was SK Slavia Prague's 23rd season in the Czech First League. The team competed in Czech First League and the Czech Cup.

== Squad ==
Squad at end of season

Note: Flags indicate national team as defined under FIFA eligibility rules; some limited exceptions apply. Players may hold more than one non-FIFA nationality.

No.	Pos.	Nation	Player
1	GK	CZE	Jiří Pavlenka
2	FW	CZE	Lukáš Železník
3	DF	CZE	Jan Mikula
4	FW	CZE	Jan Kuchta
6	DF	CZE	Tomáš Jablonský
8	MF	CZE	Jaromír Zmrhal
9	MF	CZE	Jan Štohanzl (on loan from Mladá Boleslav)
10	MF	CZE	Josef Hušbauer
11	MF	GEO	Levan Kenia
12	GK	CZE	Martin Berkovec
14	MF	SRB	Miljan Vukadinović (on loan from Mladá Boleslav)
15	DF	CZE	Libor Holík
16	MF	CZE	Milan Černý

No.	Pos.	Nation	Player
17	MF	SVK	Jaroslav Mihalík
18	MF	CZE	Jan Bořil
19	DF	CIV	Simon Deli
20	DF	CZE	Jiří Bílek
21	FW	CZE	Milan Škoda
22	DF	CZE	Tomáš Souček
23	MF	CZE	Karel Piták
24	FW	BIH	Muris Mešanović
25	DF	CZE	Michal Frydrych (on loan from Baník Ostrava)
27	MF	CZE	Antonín Barák
28	DF	CZE	Martin Latka
29	GK	CZE	Josef Řehák

=== Out on loan ===
Note: Flags indicate national team as defined under FIFA eligibility rules; some limited exceptions apply. Players may hold more than one non-FIFA nationality.

No.	Pos.	Nation	Player
—	DF	CZE	Martin Dostál (at Baník Ostrava)
—	GK	CZE	Karel Hrubeš (at Slovan Bratislava)

No.	Pos.	Nation	Player
—	FW	CZE	Marek Červenka (at Baník Ostrava)
—	MF	ARG	Aldo Baéz (at Spartak Trnava)

== Competitions ==
=== Overall record ===
Competition	First match	Last match	Starting round	Final position	Record							
Competition	First match	Last match	Starting round	Final position	Pld	W	D	L	GF	GA	GD	Win %
Czech First League	24 July 2015	14 May 2016	Matchday 1	5th	30	14	10	6	48	26	+22	46.67
Czech Cup	28 August 2015	22 September 2015	Second round	Third round	2	1	0	1	9	4	+5	50.00
Total					32	15	10	7	57	30	+27	46.88

Source: Soccerway

=== Czech First League ===
==== League table ====
Pos	Team	Pld	W	D	L	GF	GA	GD	Pts	Qualification or relegation
3	Slovan Liberec	30	17	7	6	51	35	+16	58	Qualification for the Europa League third qualifying round (Note: Mladá Boleslav qualified for the Europa League third qualifying round by winning the 2015–16 Czech Cup.)
4	Mladá Boleslav	30	16	9	5	63	37	+26	57	Qualification for the Europa League third qualifying round
5	Slavia Prague	30	14	10	6	48	26	+22	52	Qualification for the Europa League second qualifying round
6	Zbrojovka Brno	30	14	5	11	37	38	−1	47	
7	Jablonec	30	10	11	9	46	39	+7	41	

Source: Fortuna liga, Soccerway
Rules for classification: 1) Points; 2) Head-to-head points; 3) Head-to-head goal difference; 4) Head-to-head goals scored; 5) Goal difference; 6) Goals scored; 7) Play-off (only if deciding champion, UEFA competitions, or relegation); 8) Draw.

==== Results summary ====
Overall								Home						Away					
Pld	W	D	L	GF	GA	GD	Pts	W	D	L	GF	GA	GD	W	D	L	GF	GA	GD
30	14	10	6	48	27	+21	52	8	6	1	31	13	+18	6	4	5	17	14	+3

Source: See results

==== Results by round ====
Round	1	2	3	4	5	6	7	8	9	10	11	12	13	14	15	16	17	18	19	20	21	22	23	24	25	26	27	28	29	30
Ground	A	H	A	H	A	H	A	H	H	A	H	A	H	A	H	A	H	A	H	A	H	A	A	H	A	H	A	H	A	H
Result	L	D	L	W	W	D	W	W	D	D	L	W	D	W	W	L	W	D	W	L	W	L	W	D	D	D	D	W	W	W
Position	13	12	15	11	7	7	6	4	5	5	7	5	6	5	4	5	4	5	5	5	5	5	5	5	5	5	5	5	5	5

Source: See results
A = Away; H = Home; W = Win; D = Draw; L = Loss

==== Matches ====
24 July 2015 1	Viktoria Plzeň	2–1	Slavia Prague	Plzeň
17:30 CEST (UTC+02:00)	Kolář 19'; Mahmutović 80'	Report	Škoda 90'	Stadium: Doosan Arena; Attendance: 11,233; Referee: Pavel Franěk

2 August 2015 2	Slavia Prague	2–2	Slovan Liberec	Prague
17:00 CEST (UTC+02:00)	Škoda 10'; Mikula 13'	Report	Bakoš 2'; Šural 55'	Stadium: Eden Aréna; Attendance: 6,739; Referee: Pavel Královec

7 August 2015 3	Zbrojovka Brno	1–0	Slavia Prague	Brno
20:15 CEST (UTC+02:00)	Škoda 28'	Report		Stadium: Městský fotbalový stadion Srbská; Attendance: 5,090; Referee: Zbynek Proske

16 August 2015 4	Slavia Prague	4–0	Vysočina Jihlava	Prague
17:00 CEST (UTC+02:00)	Škoda 8', 65'; Deli 29'; Souček 59'	Report		Stadium: Eden Aréna; Attendance: 5,127; Referee: Miroslav Zelinka

22 August 2015 5	Baník Ostrava	1–3	Slavia Prague	Ostrava
20:15 CEST (UTC+02:00)	Mišák 74'	Report	Škoda 45', 90+1'; Voltr 8'	Stadium: Městský stadion Attendance: 4,548; Referee: Karel Hrubeš

12 September 2015 6	Slavia Prague	1–1	Mladá Boleslav	Prague
20:15 CEST (UTC+02:00)	Polom 61' (o.g.)	Report	Skalák 79'; Fleišman (red card) 87'	Stadium: Eden Aréna; Attendance: 6,151; Referee: Michal Paták

19 September 2015 7	Fastav Zlín	0–2	Slavia Prague	Zlín
17:00 CEST (UTC+02:00)		Report	Kenia 47'; Souček 61'	Stadium: Letná Stadion; Attendance: 5,678; Referee: Jan Jilek

27 September 2015 8	Slavia Prague	1–0	Sparta Prague	Prague
15:00 CEST (UTC+02:00)	Zmrhal 45+1'	Report		Stadium: Eden Aréna; Attendance: 17,663; Referee: Miroslav Zelinka

4 October 2015 9	Slavia Prague	1–1	Dukla Prague	Prague
14:30 CEST (UTC+02:00)	Škoda 63'	Report	Krmenčík 5'	Stadium: Eden Aréna; Attendance: 10,547; Referee: Pavel Královec

17 October 2015 10	Jablonec	0–0	Slavia Prague	Jablonec nad Nisou
14:30 CEST (UTC+02:00)		Report		Stadium: Stadion Střelnice; Attendance: 3,042; Referee: Radek Příhoda

23 October 2015 11	Slavia Prague	0–2	Sigma Olomouc	Prague
20:15 CEST (UTC+02:00)		Report	Houska 45+1', 50'	Stadium: Eden Aréna; Attendance: 5,321; Referee: Pavel Franěk

1 November 2015 12	Teplice	0–1	Slavia Prague	Teplice
18:30 CET (UTC+01:00)		Report	Bílek 86'	Stadium: Na Stínadlech; Attendance: 6,871; Referee: Tomáš Kocourek

8 November 2015 13	Slavia Prague	2–2	Bohemians 1905	Prague
15:00 CET (UTC+01:00)	Škoda 38', 87'	Report	Deli 9' (o.g.); Jindřišek 32' (pen.)	Stadium: Eden Aréna; Attendance: 13,976; Referee: Ondřej Lerch

21 November 2015 14	Slovácko	0–2	Slavia Prague	Uherské Hradiště
17:00 CET (UTC+01:00)		Report	Vukadinović 33'; Zmrhal 59'	Stadium: Městský fotbalový stadion Miroslava Valenty; Attendance: 4,548; Referee: Pavel Orel

28 November 2015 15	Slavia Prague	2–1	1. FK Příbram	Prague
17:00 CET (UTC+01:00)	Škoda 27' (pen.); Piták 67'	Report	Divíšek 74'	Stadium: Eden Aréna; Attendance: 5,642; Referee: Radek Příhoda

6 December 2015 16	Slovan Liberec	2–1	Slavia Prague	Liberec
14:00 CET (UTC+01:00)	Bakoš 57'; Pavelka 59'	Report	Zmrhal 2'	Stadium: Stadion u Nisy; Attendance: 6,919; Referee: Jan Jilek

13 February 2016 17	Slavia Prague	2–0	Zbrojovka Brno	Prague
18:20 CET (UTC+01:00)	Mešanović 15'; Bílek 42'	Report		Stadium: Eden Aréna; Attendance: 12,067; Referee: Tomáš Kocourek

20 February 2016 18	Vysočina Jihlava	0–0	Slavia Prague	Jihlava
18:00 CET (UTC+01:00)		Report		Stadium: Stadion v Jiráskově ulici Attendance: 4,290; Referee: Michal Paták

28 February 2016 19	Slavia Prague	3–1	Baník Ostrava	Prague
17:30 CET (UTC+01:00)	Souček 32', 37', 65'	Report	Dyjan 27'	Stadium: Eden Aréna; Attendance: 12,985; Referee: Zbynek Proske

5 March 2016 20	Mladá Boleslav	2–1	Slavia Prague	Mladá Boleslav
18:00 CET (UTC+01:00)	Magera 57' (pen.); Rada 85'; Kúdela (red card) 90+1'	Report	Frydrych (red card) 55'; Mešanović 90'	Stadium: Městský stadion Attendance: 5,000; Referee: Petr Ardeleánu

11 March 2016 21	Slavia Prague	1–0	Fastav Zlín	Prague
20:15 CET (UTC+01:00)	Souček 6'	Report		Stadium: Eden Aréna; Attendance: 6,673; Referee: Miroslav Zelinka

20 March 2016 22	Sparta Prague	3–1	Slavia Prague	Prague
19:30 CET (UTC+01:00)	Lafata 56'; Costa 74'; Zahustel 77'	Report	Škoda 6'	Stadium: Generali Arena; Attendance: 18,684; Referee: Tomáš Kocourek

3 April 2016 23	Dukla Prague	0–1	Slavia Prague	Prague
15:00 CEST (UTC+02:00)		Report	Štetina 33' (o.g.)	Stadium: Stadion Juliska; Attendance: 7,753; Referee: Zbynek Proske

9 April 2016 24	Slavia Prague	0–0	Jablonec	Prague
17:00 CEST (UTC+02:00)		Report		Stadium: Eden Aréna; Attendance: 8,085; Referee: Jan Jilek

16 April 2016 25	Sigma Olomouc	1–1	Slavia Prague	Olomouc
17:00 CEST (UTC+02:00)	Navrátil 59'	Report	Zmrhal 79'	Stadium: Andrův stadion Attendance: 5,459; Referee: Ondřej Pechanec

23 April 2016 26	Slavia Prague	2–2	Teplice	Prague
20:15 CEST (UTC+02:00)	Škoda 16', 51'	Report	Kukec 31'; Táborský 79'; Soungole (red card) 90+5'	Stadium: Eden Aréna; Attendance: 6,157; Referee: Jiří Houdek

30 April 2016 27	Bohemians 1905	0–0	Slavia Prague	Prague
19:00 CEST (UTC+02:00)		Report		Stadium: Ďolíček; Attendance: 5,000; Referee: Jiří Jech

7 May 2016 28	Slavia Prague	5–1	Slovácko	Prague
15:30 CEST (UTC+02:00)	Barák 22', 43'; Hušbauer 73'; Bílek 79'; Škoda 87'	Report	Diviš 72'	Stadium: Eden Aréna; Attendance: 6,011; Referee: Martin Nenadál

11 May 2016 29	1. FK Příbram	1–3	Slavia Prague	Příbram
18:15 CEST (UTC+02:00)	Brandner 52'	Report	Souček 12'; Mešanović 15'; Barák 29'	Stadium: Na Litavce; Attendance: 4,386; Referee: Emanuel Marek

14 May 2016 30	Slavia Prague	5–0	Viktoria Plzeň	Prague
15:30 CEST (UTC+02:00)	Mihalík 4'; Barák 20'; Mešanović 27'; Hušbauer 57'; Vukadinović 87'	Report		Stadium: Eden Aréna; Attendance: 10,121; Referee: Pavel Julínek

=== Czech Cup ===
28 August 2015 Second round	SK Union 2013	0–7	Slavia Prague	Nový Bydžov
17:30 CEST (UTC+02:00)		Report	Voltr 20', 36', 39'; Štohanzl 54'; Červenka 73', 83'; Zmrhal 80'	Stadium: Městský stadion Attendance: 2,056; Referee: Ondřej Berka

22 September 2015 Third round	FK Ústí nad Labem	4–2	Slavia Prague	Ústí nad Labem
18:00 CEST (UTC+02:00)	Peterka 26'; Smola 36' (pen.); Hošek 66'; Novotný 90+2'	Report	Zmrhal 71'; Škoda 89'	Stadium: Městský stadion Attendance: 3,296; Referee: Ondřej Pechanec
