= Jan Bořil =

Czech footballer (born 1991)

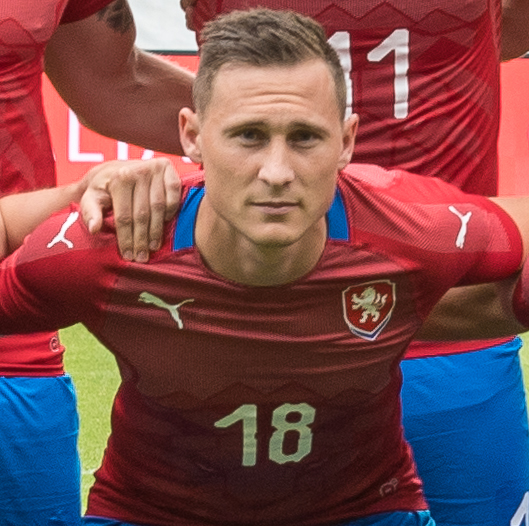
- Bořil with Czech Republic in 2018

Personal information
- Date of birth: 11 January 1991 (age 35)
- Place of birth: Nymburk, Czechoslovakia
- Height: 1.75 m (5 ft 9 in)
- Position: Left-back

Team information
- Current team: Slovan Liberec

Senior career*
Years	Team	Apps	(Gls)
2009–2016	Mladá Boleslav	111	(1)
2010–2011	→ Viktoria Žižkov (loan)	39	(3)
2016–2026	Slavia Prague	210	(13)
2016–2023	Slavia Prague B	15	(1)
2026–	Slovan Liberec	0	(0)

International career^{‡}
2007	Czech Republic U16	5	(0)
2007–2008	Czech Republic U17	14	(2)
2008–2009	Czech Republic U18	11	(2)
2017–	Czech Republic	31	(0)
- * Club domestic league appearances and goals as of 19 April 2026 ‡ National team caps and goals as of 19 November 2024

Jan Bořil (born 11 January 1991) is a Czech professional footballer who plays as a left-back for Czech First League club Slovan Liberec.

On 23 April 2026, Bořil was banned by the LFA Disciplinary commission for seven matches after he received red card and subsequently threatened referee Dalibor Černý, shouting at him "Počkej uvnitř!" (lit. 'Wait inside!') in the away match against Hradec Králové. Bořil apologized for his behavior.

On 27 June 2025, Bořil signed a one-year contract with Slovan Liberec.

On 1 September 2017, he debuted for the Czech senior squad in a 2018 FIFA World Cup qualifier against Germany.

== Career statistics ==
=== Club ===
As of match played 19 April 2026

Appearances and goals by club, season and competition
Club	Season	League			Czech Cup		Continental		Other		Total	
Club	Season	Division	Apps	Goals	Apps	Goals	Apps	Goals	Apps	Goals	Apps	Goals
Mladá Boleslav	2009–10	Czech First League	11	0	0	0	—		—		11	0
Mladá Boleslav	2011–12	Czech First League	3	0	0	0	—		—		3	0
Mladá Boleslav	2012–13	Czech First League	29	0	5	1	4 (Note: Appearance(s) in UEFA Europa League)	0	—		38	1
Mladá Boleslav	2013–14	Czech First League	25	0	3	0	—		—		27	0
Mladá Boleslav	2014–15	Czech First League	28	1	6	0	4	0	—		38	1
Mladá Boleslav	2015–16	Czech First League	15	0	3	0	1	0	—		19	0
Mladá Boleslav	Total		111	1	17	1	9	0	—		137	2
Viktoria Žižkov (loan)	2010–11	Czech National Football League	28	3	0	0	—		—		28	3
Viktoria Žižkov (loan)	2011–12	Czech First League	11	0	0	0	—		—		11	0
Viktoria Žižkov (loan)	Total		39	3	0	0	—		—		39	3
Slavia Prague	2015–16	Czech First League	11	0	0	0	—		—		11	0
Slavia Prague	2016–17	Czech First League	24	1	3	1	5	0	—		32	2
Slavia Prague	2017–18	Czech First League	26	0	4	0	7 (Note: Appearances in UEFA Champions League)	0	—		37	0
Slavia Prague	2018–19	Czech First League	29	2	3	0	13 (Note: Two appearances in UEFA Champions League, eleven appearances in UEFA Europa League)	0	—		45	2
Slavia Prague	2019–20	Czech First League	28	1	0	0	8	2	1 (Note: Appearance in Czech-Slovak Supercup)	0	37	3
Slavia Prague	2020–21	Czech First League	27	3	3	0	13	0	—		43	3
Slavia Prague	2021–22	Czech First League	5	0	0	0	1	0	—		6	0
Slavia Prague	2022–23	Czech First League	2	0	0	0	0	0	—		2	0
Slavia Prague	2023–24	Czech First League	13	2	2	0	4	0	—		19	2
Slavia Prague	2024–25	Czech First League	23	1	0	0	9 (Note: Four appearances in UEFA Champions League, five appearances in UEFA Europa League)	0	—		32	1
Slavia Prague	2025–26	Czech First League	22	3	0	0	3	0	—		25	3
Slavia Prague	Total		210	13	15	1	63	2	1	0	289	16
Slavia Prague B	2022–23	Czech National Football League	12	1	—		—		—		12	1
Slavia Prague B	2023–24	Bohemian Football League	3	0	—		—		—		3	0
Slavia Prague B	Total		15	1	—		—		—		15	1
Career total			375	18	32	2	72	2	1	0	480	22

=== International ===
As of match played 19 November 2024

Appearances and goals by national team and year
National team	Year	Apps	Goals
Czech Republic	2017	4	0
Czech Republic	2018	5	0
Czech Republic	2019	6	0
Czech Republic	2020	3	0
Czech Republic	2021	9	0
Czech Republic	2024	4	0
Total		31	0

== Honours ==
Slavia Prague

- Czech First League: 2016–17, 2018–19, 2019–20, 2020–21, 2024–25, 2025–26
- Czech Cup: 2017–18, 2018–19, 2020–21
- Czech-Slovak Supercup: 2019
