= Milan Škoda =

Czech footballer

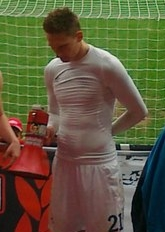
- Škoda in 2015

Personal information
- Date of birth: 16 January 1986 (age 40)
- Place of birth: Prague, Czechoslovakia
- Height: 1.90 m (6 ft 3 in)
- Position: Forward

Youth career
- 1992–2000: ČAFC Praha
- 2000: Pragis Satalice
- 2000: ČAFC Praha
- 2001–2004: Bohemians 1905

Senior career*
Years	Team	Apps	(Gls)
2004–2012	Bohemians 1905	114	(25)
2012–2020	Slavia Prague	210	(78)
2020–2021	Çaykur Rizespor	46	(19)
2021–2023	Mladá Boleslav	42	(10)
2023–2025	Slavia Prague B	36	(8)
2025	Slavia Prague	2	(0)
Total		450	(140)

International career
2015–2019	Czech Republic	19	(4)
- * Club domestic league appearances and goals as of 4 January 2025

Milan Škoda (born 16 January 1986) is a Czech former professional footballer who last played as a forward for Bohemian Football League club Slavia Prague B. He has played for the Czech Republic national team at international level.

== Club career ==
=== Slavia Prague ===
Škoda came to Slavia as a forward but he had to play as a central defender in the 2013–14 season. The following season he moved forward again scoring 19 goals and he became Slavia fan's favorite.

On 9 May 2018, Škoda played as Slavia Prague won the 2017–18 Czech Cup final against FK Jablonec. On 5 January 2019, he signed a new contract with Slavia Prague, until 30 June 2020.

=== Çaykur Rizespor ===
On 11 January 2020, Škoda signed a contract with Çaykur Rizespor.

=== Mladá Boleslav ===
On 6 July 2021, Škoda signed a contract with FK Mladá Boleslav.

=== Slavia Prague B ===
On 2 September 2023, Škoda signed a two-year contract with Slavia Prague B. His last season before retirement was the 2024–25 season, in which he played 17 games for Slavia B in the second league, scoring 3 times. He featured for Slavia's A-team on two occasions at the end of the season, making substitute appearances in May 2025 against Jablonec and Baník Ostrava.

== International career ==
Škoda made his senior international debut for the Czech Republic on 12 June 2015 in a 2–1 away loss to Iceland in UEFA Euro 2016 qualifying, coming on as a substitute for Lukáš Vácha in the 79th minute. He scored his first two international goals against Kazakhstan in Euro 2016 qualifying. Škoda later represented the Czech Republic at the tournament proper, and scored the first goal in a 2–2 draw against Croatia in the group stage.

== Career statistics ==
=== Club ===
As of match played 15 May 2021

Appearances and goals by club, season and competition
Club	Season	League			National cup		Continental		Other		Total	
Club	Season	Division	Apps	Goals	Apps	Goals	Apps	Goals	Apps	Goals	Apps	Goals
Bohemians 1905	2007–08	Czech First League	24	4	0	0	—		—		24	4
Bohemians 1905	2008–09	Czech National Football League	26	8	0	0	—		—		26	8
Bohemians 1905	2009–10	Czech First League	22	3	0	0	—		—		22	3
Bohemians 1905	2010–11	Czech First League	28	8	0	0	—		—		28	8
Bohemians 1905	2011–12	Czech First League	14	2	0	0	—		—		14	2
Bohemians 1905	Total		114	25	0	0	—		—		114	25
Slavia Prague	2011–12	Czech First League	9	2	0	0	—		—		9	2
Slavia Prague	2012–13	Czech First League	28	4	0	0	—		—		28	4
Slavia Prague	2013–14	Czech First League	25	0	4	1	—		—		29	1
Slavia Prague	2014–15	Czech First League	28	19	0	0	—		—		28	19
Slavia Prague	2015–16	Czech First League	25	14	1	1	—		—		26	15
Slavia Prague	2016–17	Czech First League	29	15	1	0	4	1	—		34	16
Slavia Prague	2017–18	Czech First League	28	11	3	1	8	2	—		39	14
Slavia Prague	2018–19	Czech First League	28	7	2	0	10	2	—		40	9
Slavia Prague	2019–20	Czech First League	14	5	1	4	4	0	0	0	19	9
Slavia Prague	Total		214	77	12	7	26	5	0	0	252	89
Çaykur Rizespor	2019–20	Süper Lig	17	10	2	0	—		—		19	10
Çaykur Rizespor	2020–21	Süper Lig	29	9	0	0	—		—		29	9
Çaykur Rizespor	Total		46	19	2	0	0	0	0	0	48	19
Career total			345	112	14	7	26	5	0	0	385	124

=== International ===
As of match played 5 June 2017

Appearances and goals by national team and year
National team	Year	Apps	Goals
Czech Republic	2015	7	2
Czech Republic	2016	8	2
Czech Republic	2017	3	0
Total		18	4

As of match played 17 June 2016
Scores and results list Czech Republic's goal tally first, score column indicates score after each Škoda goal.

List of international goals scored by Milan Škoda
No.	Date	Venue	Cap	Opponent	Score	Result	Competition
1	3 September 2015	Doosan Arena, Plzeň, Czech Republic	2	Kazakhstan	1–1	2–1	UEFA Euro 2016 qualification
2	3 September 2015	Doosan Arena, Plzeň, Czech Republic	2	Kazakhstan	2–1	2–1	UEFA Euro 2016 qualification
3	27 May 2016	Kufstein Arena, Kufstein, Austria	8	Malta	2–0	6–0	Friendly
4	17 June 2016	Stade Geoffroy-Guichard, Saint-Étienne, France	10	Croatia	1–2	2–2	UEFA Euro 2016

== Honours ==
Slavia Prague

- Czech First League: 2016–17, 2018–19
- Czech Cup: 2017–18, 2018–19

Individual

- Czech First League top scorer: 2016–17
