= Mick van Buren =

Dutch footballer

Personal information
- Date of birth: 24 August 1992 (age 34)
- Place of birth: Ridderkerk, Netherlands
- Height: 1.84 m (6 ft 0 in)
- Position: Forward

Team information
- Current team: Hradec Králové
- Number: 10

Youth career
- Slikkerveer
- Excelsior
- Feyenoord
- Excelsior

Senior career*
Years	Team	Apps	(Gls)
2011–2013	Excelsior	40	(13)
2013–2016	Esbjerg	68	(18)
2016–2024	Slavia Prague	113	(20)
2020	→ ADO Den Haag (loan)	4	(0)
2020	→ České Budějovice (loan)	8	(1)
2021–2022	→ České Budějovice (loan)	24	(4)
2022	→ Slovan Liberec (loan)	15	(9)
2024–2025	Cracovia	22	(4)
2025–	Hradec Králové	23	(3)
- * Club domestic league appearances and goals as of 15 May 2026

Mick van Buren (born 24 August 1992) is a Dutch professional footballer who plays as a forward for Czech First League club Hradec Králové.

== Club career ==
Born in Ridderkerk, Netherlands, van Buren joined Excelsior from SV Slikkerveer as a teenager. Aside from a brief spell at Feyenoord, he played for the Dutch club until the summer of 2013. During his time with SBV Excelsior, he scored 13 goals in 27 appearances in the Dutch Eerste Divisie.

van Buren's performances caught the attention of Esbjerg fB. On 4 July 2013, he became new manager Niels Frederiksen's first signing, joining on a free transfer and agreeing a three-year long contract with the defending Danish Cup champions.

=== Slavia Prague ===
In July 2016, van Buren moved to Czech First League club Slavia Prague. During a pre-season friendly, Van Buren scored a hat trick against Nice. It took him 14 league games to score a goal for Slavia, eventually scoring twice in their 4–0 home win against Mladá Boleslav on 27 August 2017. On 9 May 2018, he played as Slavia Prague won the 2017-18 Czech Cup final against Jablonec.

On 22 November 2018, van Buren signed a new contract with Slavia until the summer of 2021.

=== Cracovia ===
On 15 July 2024, van Buren joined Polish Ekstraklasa club Cracovia on a two-year deal, with an extension option.

=== Hradec Králové ===
On 9 July 2025, van Buren signed a multi-year contract with Czech First League club Hradec Králové.

== Personal life ==
Born in Ridderkerk, he was raised at local side Slikkerveer. His father Leo van Buren was also a professional footballer and he is a grandson of former Dutch international player Theo Laseroms.

== Career statistics ==
As of match played 24 May 2025

Appearances and goals by club, season and competition
Club	Season	League			National cup (Note: Includes KNVB Cup, Danish Cup, Czech Cup)		Continental		Other		Total	
Club	Season	Division	Apps	Goals	Apps	Goals	Apps	Goals	Apps	Goals	Apps	Goals
Excelsior	2011–12	Eredivisie	11	0	1	0	—		—		12	0
Excelsior	2012–13	Eerste Divisie	28	13	1	0	—		—		29	13
Excelsior	Total		39	13	2	0	—		—		41	13
Esbjerg	2013–14	Danish Superliga	26	7	1	0	9 (Note: Appearances in UEFA Europa League)	4	—		36	11
Esbjerg	2014–15	Danish Superliga	17	5	3	1	3	0	—		23	6
Esbjerg	2015–16	Danish Superliga	25	6	2	2	—		—		27	8
Esbjerg	Total		68	18	6	3	12	4	—		86	25
Slavia Prague	2016–17	Czech First League	10	0	3	2	2	0	—		15	2
Slavia Prague	2017–18	Czech First League	16	5	2	0	9 (Note: Three appearances in UEFA Champions League, six appearances in UEFA Europa League)	0	—		27	5
Slavia Prague	2018–19	Czech First League	13	3	2	2	4	1	—		19	6
Slavia Prague	2019–20	Czech First League	14	1	2	1	3 (Note: Appearances in UEFA Champions League)	0	1 (Note: Appearance in Czech-Slovak Supercup)	0	20	2
Slavia Prague	2020–21	Czech First League	12	1	4	0	—		—		16	1
Slavia Prague	2021–22	Czech First League	2	0	—		—		—		2	0
Slavia Prague	2022–23	Czech First League	19	5	3	0	—		—		22	5
Slavia Prague	2023–24	Czech First League	27	5	2	1	9	0	—		38	6
Slavia Prague	Total		113	20	18	6	27	1	1	0	159	27
ADO Den Haag (loan)	2019–20	Eredivisie	4	0	—		—		—		4	0
České Budějovice (loan)	2020–21	Czech First League	8	1	0	0	—		—		8	1
České Budějovice (loan)	2021–22	Czech First League	24	4	2	1	—		—		26	5
Slovan Liberec (loan)	2022–23	Czech First League	15	9	2	3	—		—		17	12
Cracovia	2024–25	Ekstraklasa	22	4	0	0	—		—		22	4
Career total			293	69	30	13	39	5	1	0	363	87

== Honours ==
Slavia Prague

- Czech First League: 2016–17, 2018–19, 2019–20, 2020–21
- Czech Cup: 2017–18, 2018–19, 2020–21, 2022–23
