= Michael Ngadeu-Ngadjui =

Cameroonian footballer

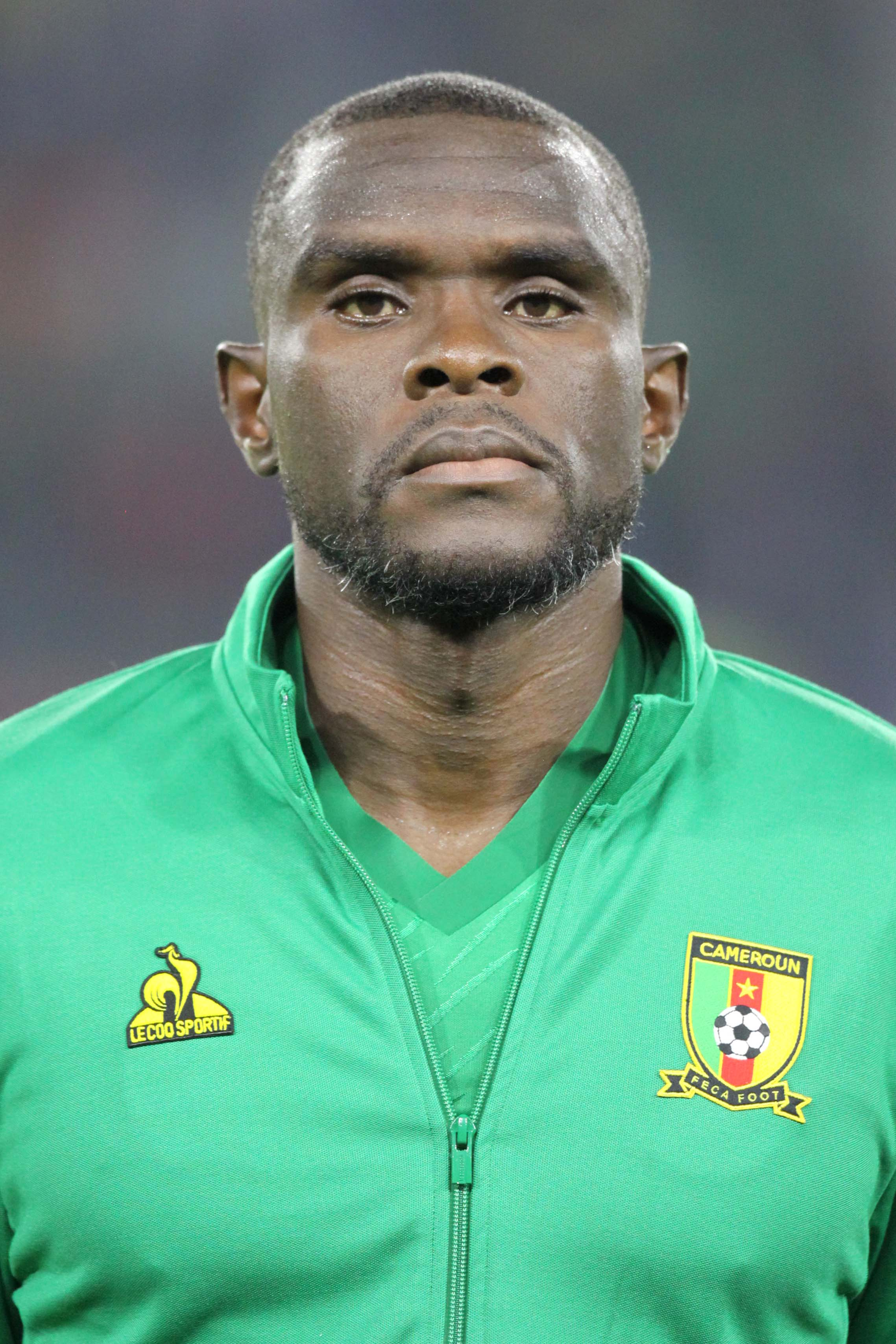
- Ngadeu-Ngadjui in 2022

Personal information
- Full name: Michael Ngadeu-Ngadjui
- Date of birth: 23 November 1990 (age 35)
- Place of birth: Bafang, Cameroon
- Height: 1.90 m (6 ft 3 in)
- Position: Centre-back

Team information
- Current team: Chongqing Tonglianglong
- Number: 32

Youth career
- Diables Rouges Maroua
- 2007–2008: Canon Yaoundé

Senior career*
Years	Team	Apps	(Gls)
2008–2010	Canon Yaoundé		
2010–2011	Kirchhörder SC		
2011–2012	SV Sandhausen II	18	(1)
2012–2014	1. FC Nürnberg II	54	(4)
2014–2016	Botoșani	53	(7)
2016–2019	Slavia Prague	76	(7)
2019–2023	Gent	119	(9)
2023–2025	Beijing Guoan	79	(5)
2026–	Chongqing Tonglianglong	25	(3)

International career^{‡}
2016–	Cameroon	64	(5)
Medal record
Men's football
Representing Cameroon
Africa Cup of Nations
Winner	2017 Gabon
Third place	2021 Cameroon
- * Club domestic league appearances and goals as of 8 November 2026 ‡ National team caps and goals as of 8 October 2025

Michael Ngadeu-Ngadjui (born 23 November 1990) is a Cameroonian professional footballer who plays as a centre-back for Chinese Super League club Chongqing Tonglianglong and captains the Cameroon national team.

== Club career ==
Ngadeu trained as a youth with Canon Yaoundé. After graduating in Cameroon, he spent six months learning German in order to study Civil Engineering in Germany. Whilst in Germany, he played for SV Sandhausen II and 1. FC Nürnberg II, before transferring to Romanian club Botoșani in 2014, where he eventually wore the captain's armband.

=== Slavia Prague ===
Despite rumours linking him with a move to Steaua Bucharest, in the summer of 2016 he completed a €500k transfer to Slavia Prague.

Upon his return from the 2017 Africa Cup of Nations, he scored the only hat-trick of his senior career for Slavia Prague in his first game back on 25 February 2017 in their 8–1 away win at Příbram. On 9 May 2018, he played as Slavia Prague won the 2017–18 Czech Cup final against Jablonec.

In January 2019, a €4.5 million transfer to Premier League side Fulham fell through at the last minute, after Ngadeu had flown to London and passed a medical.

He again featured heavily in the 2018–19 season, both in Slavia's Europa League campaign that ended in the quarter finals, and domestically, where the team secured their first domestic double since 1942. At the end of the 2018–19 Czech First League season, he was voted the league's best defender.

=== Gent ===
In July 2019, Ngadeu moved to Belgian club Gent.

=== Beijing Guoan ===
On 30 March 2023, Ngadeu joined Chinese Super League club Beijing Guoan. On 15 April 2024, Ngadeu made his debut for Guoan in a 1–1 home draw against Meizhou Hakka. On 13 August 2023, he scored his first goal for Guoan in a 1–0 away win against Nantong Zhiyun. He was selected in China Super League's 2023 Team of the Season.

Throughout the 2024 season, he was selected in the league's team of the month 4 times. Guoan extended his contract to the end of the 2025 season on 4 May 2025.

He departed Guoan at the end of the 2025 season after his contract expired. Across 92 appearances, he scored 6 goals. He won the 2025 Chinese FA Cup with the club.

=== Chongqing Tonglianglong ===
On 7 February 2026, newly-promoted Chinese Super League side Chongqing Tonglianglong announced the signing of Ngadeu.

== International career ==
Ngadeu made his senior debut for the Cameroon national team in a 2–0 win over The Gambia for 2017 Africa Cup of Nations qualification. He went on to play every minute of Cameroon's victorious 2017 Africa Cup of Nations campaign, scoring two goals, including a clearance off the line followed by the winning goal in the group stage match against Guinea-Bissau. He was ultimately named one of three defenders in the Confederation of African Football's Team of the Tournament. He played in all 3 group games for Cameroon in the 2017 FIFA Confederations Cup.

In September 2018, he was named as captain for new manager Clarence Seedorf's first 2019 Africa Cup of Nations qualifying game against The Comoros. He participated the 2019 and 2021 editions of Africa Cup of Nations, playing every single minute in both tournaments except the third place play-off of the latter. However, he was not included in Cameroon's squad for the 2022 FIFA World Cup. He was later one of four veteran players left out of the 2025 Africa Cup of Nations squad.

== Career statistics ==
=== Club ===
As of match played 8 November 2026

Appearances and goals by club, season and competition
Club	Season	League			Cup		Continental		Other		Total	
Club	Season	Division	Apps	Goals	Apps	Goals	Apps	Goals	Apps	Goals	Apps	Goals
1. FC Nürnberg II	2012–13	Regionalliga Bayern	23	1	—		—		—		23	1
1. FC Nürnberg II	2013–14	Regionalliga Bayern	31	3	—		—		—		31	3
1. FC Nürnberg II	Total		54	4	—		—		—		54	4
Botoșani	2014–15	Liga I	28	1	1	0	—		—		29	1
Botoșani	2015–16	Liga I	25	6	0	0	0	0	—		25	6
Botoșani	Total		53	7	1	0	0	0	—		54	7
Slavia Prague	2016–17	Czech First League	27	6	4	0	5 (Note: Appearances in UEFA Europa League)	0	—		36	6
Slavia Prague	2017–18	Czech First League	20	1	2	0	9 (Note: Four appearances in UEFA Champions League, five appearances and one goal in UEFA Europa League)	1	—		31	2
Slavia Prague	2018–19	Czech First League	29	0	3	0	13 (Note: Two appearances in UEFA Champions League, eleven appearances and one goal in UEFA Europa League)	1	—		45	1
Slavia Prague	Total		76	7	9	0	27	2	—		112	9
Gent	2019–20	Belgian First Division A	29	3	1	0	12	1	—		42	4
Gent	2020–21	Belgian First Division A	27	1	0	0	7 (Note: Three appearances in UEFA Champions League, four appearances in UEFA Europa League)	0	—		34	1
Gent	2021–22	Belgian First Division A	33	4	3	0	13 (Note: Appearances in UEFA Europa Conference League)	0	—		49	4
Gent	2022–23	Belgian First Division A	30	1	3	0	11 (Note: Nine appearances in UEFA Europa Conference League, two appearances in UEFA Europa League qualifiers)	0	1 (Note: Appearance in Belgian Super Cup)	0	45	1
Gent	Total		119	9	7	0	43	1	1	0	170	10
Beijing Guoan	2023	Chinese Super League	29	1	2	0	—		—		31	1
Beijing Guoan	2024	Chinese Super League	28	3	2	0	—		—		30	3
Beijing Guoan	2025	Chinese Super League	22	1	3	0	6 (Note: Appearances in AFC Champions League Two)	1	—		31	2
Beijing Guoan	Total		79	5	7	0	6	1	—		92	6
Chongqing Tonglianglong	2026	Chinese Super League	25	3	2	0	—		—		27	3
Career total			406	35	26	0	76	4	1	0	509	39

=== International ===
As of match played 13 November 2025

Appearances and goals by national team and year
National team	Year	Apps	Goals
Cameroon	2016	4	0
Cameroon	2017	17	2
Cameroon	2018	4	0
Cameroon	2019	9	0
Cameroon	2020	1	0
Cameroon	2021	9	2
Cameroon	2022	9	0
Cameroon	2024	7	1
Cameroon	2025	4	0
Total		64	5

Scores and results list Cameroon's goal tally first, score column indicates score after each Ngadeu-Ngadjui goal.

List of international goals scored by Michael Ngadeu-Ngadjui
No.	Date	Venue	Opponent	Score	Result	Competition
1	18 January 2017	Stade d'Angondjé, Libreville, Gabon	Guinea-Bissau	2–1	2–1	2017 Africa Cup of Nations
2	2 February 2017	Stade de Franceville, Franceville, Gabon	Ghana	1–0	2–0	2017 Africa Cup of Nations
3	3 September 2021	Paul Biya Stadium, Yaoundé, Cameroon	Malawi	2–0	2–0	2022 FIFA World Cup qualification
4	11 October 2021	Ibn Batouta Stadium, Tangiers, Morocco	Mozambique	1–0	1–0	2022 FIFA World Cup qualification
5	8 June 2024	Ahmadou Ahidjo Stadium, Yaoundé, Cameroon	Cape Verde	1–0	4–1	2026 FIFA World Cup qualification

== Honours ==
Slavia Prague

- Czech First League: 2016–17, 2018–19
- Czech Cup: 2017–18, 2018–19

Gent

- Belgian Cup: 2021–22

Beijing Guoan

- Chinese FA Cup: 2025

Cameroon

- Africa Cup of Nations: 2017

Individual

- Africa Cup of Nations Team of the Tournament: 2017
- Czech First League Best Defender of the Season: 2018–19
