= Michal Frydrych =

Czech footballer (born 1990)

Personal information
- Date of birth: 27 February 1990 (age 36)
- Place of birth: Hustopeče nad Bečvou, Czechoslovakia
- Height: 1.87 m (6 ft 2 in)
- Position: Centre-back

Team information
- Current team: Baník Ostrava
- Number: 17

Youth career
- 1996–1998: Sokol Hustopeče nad Bečvou
- 1998–2004: Hranice
- 2004–2010: Baník Ostrava

Senior career*
| Years | Team | Apps | (Gls) |
| 2010–2015 | Baník Ostrava | 118 | (8) |
| 2015–2020 | Slavia Prague | 102 | (9) |
| 2020–2022 | Wisła Kraków | 55 | (7) |
| 2022– | Baník Ostrava | 71 | (6) |

International career
| 2012 | Czech Republic U21 | 4 | (0) |
- * Club domestic league appearances and goals as of 25 May 2026

Michal Frydrych (born 27 February 1990) is a Czech professional footballer who plays as a centre-back for Czech First League side Baník Ostrava.

== Career ==
On 5 March 2017, he scored the winning goal in Slavia's 1–0 victory over Viktoria Plzeň, a match between the two forerunners for the title that season. He also opened the scoring in a 4–0 win over Zbrojovka Brno on 27 May that clinched the title for Slavia.

== Career statistics ==
As of 16 July 2020

Appearances and goals by club, season and competition
| Club | Season | League | | | Czech Cup | | Continental | | Other | | Total | |
| Club | Season | Division | Apps | Goals | Apps | Goals | Apps | Goals | Apps | Goals | Apps | Goals |
|---|---|---|---|---|---|---|---|---|---|---|---|---|
| Baník Ostrava | 2009–10 | Czech First League | 1 | 0 | 0 | 0 | — | | — | | 1 | 0 |
| Baník Ostrava | 2010–11 | Czech First League | 10 | 0 | 0 | 0 | 1 (Note: Appearance(s) in UEFA Europa League) | 0 | — | | 11 | 0 |
| Baník Ostrava | 2011–12 | Czech First League | 18 | 1 | 2 | 0 | — | | — | | 20 | 1 |
| Baník Ostrava | 2012–13 | Czech First League | 28 | 3 | 0 | 0 | — | | — | | 28 | 3 |
| Baník Ostrava | 2013–14 | Czech First League | 28 | 0 | 1 | 0 | — | | — | | 29 | 0 |
| Baník Ostrava | 2014–15 | Czech First League | 29 | 4 | 2 | 0 | — | | — | | 31 | 4 |
| Baník Ostrava | 2015–16 | Czech First League | 4 | 0 | 0 | 0 | — | | — | | 4 | 0 |
| Baník Ostrava | Total | | 118 | 8 | 5 | 0 | 1 | 0 | — | | 124 | 8 |
| Slavia Prague | 2015–16 | Czech First League | 15 | 0 | 0 | 0 | — | | — | | 16 | 0 |
| Slavia Prague | 2016–17 | Czech First League | 25 | 4 | 3 | 1 | 2 | 0 | — | | 30 | 5 |
| Slavia Prague | 2017–18 | Czech First League | 20 | 1 | 4 | 3 | 8 (Note: Four appearances in UEFA Champions League, four appearances in UEFA Europa League) | 0 | — | | 32 | 4 |
| Slavia Prague | 2018–19 | Czech First League | 19 | 3 | 5 | 2 | 7 (Note: One appearance in UEFA Champions League, six appearances in UEFA Europa League) | 0 | — | | 31 | 5 |
| Slavia Prague | 2019–20 | Czech First League | 23 | 1 | 2 | 1 | 3 (Note: Appearances in UEFA Champions League) | 0 | 0 | 0 | 28 | 2 |
| Slavia Prague | Total | | 102 | 9 | 15 | 7 | 20 | 0 | 0 | 0 | 137 | 16 |
| Career total | | | 220 | 17 | 20 | 7 | 21 | 0 | 0 | 0 | 261 | 24 |

== Honours ==
Slavia Prague

- Czech First League: 2016–17, 2018–19, 2019–20
- Czech Cup: 2017–18, 2018–19
