= Pavel Eismann =

Czech footballer

Personal information
- Full name: Pavel Eismann
- Date of birth: 20 August 1984 (age 42)
- Place of birth: Chrudim, Czechoslovakia
- Height: 1.82 m (5 ft 11 1/2 in)
- Position: Midfielder

Youth career
- 1993–1998: MFK Chrudim
- 1998–2001: FC Hradec Králové

Senior career*
Years	Team	Apps	(Gls)
2002–2005	Slovan Liberec B		
2004	→ Pardubice (loan)	3	(0)
2005–2006	Viktoria Žižkov	25	(0)
2007	Marila Příbram	9	(0)
2007–2008	1. FC Slovácko	18	(1)
2008	Fotbal Třinec	15	(1)
2009	Bohemians 1905	11	(0)
2009–2010	Fotbal Třinec	28	(1)
2010–2012	Sandecja Nowy Sącz	48	(2)
2012–2013	Fotbal Třinec	54	(2)
2013–2018	Karviná	139	(5)
2018–2020	Zbrojovka Brno	60	(3)
- * Club domestic league appearances and goals

Pavel Eismann (born 20 August 1984) is a Czech former professional footballer who played as a midfielder.

== Notes ==
- Pavel Eismann – Czech First League statistics at Fotbal DNES (in Czech)
- Pavel Eismann at 90minut.pl (in Polish)
