= Jasmin Šćuk =

Bosnian footballer (born 1990)

Personal information
- Date of birth: 14 July 1990 (age 36)
- Place of birth: Jablanica, SFR Yugoslavia
- Height: 1.85 m (6 ft 1 in)
- Position: Midfielder

Youth career
- 2006–2007: Turbina Jablanica
- 2007–2009: Radnik Hadžići
- 2009–2010: Mladá Boleslav

Senior career*
Years	Team	Apps	(Gls)
2011–2016	Mladá Boleslav	128	(27)
2016–2017	Slavia Prague	18	(0)
2017–2020	BB Erzurumspor	92	(10)
2020–2021	Altay	27	(1)

International career^{‡}
2008	Bosnia and Herzegovina U19	2	(0)
- * Club domestic league appearances and goals as of 14 May 2021 ‡ National team caps and goals as of 17 September 2008

Jasmin Šćuk (born 14 July 1990) is a Bosnian footballer.

== Club career ==
Šćuk was part of the youth team of FK Mladá Boleslav before breaking into the first team in November 2010. He signed for Slavia Prague in 2016 after his contract at Mladá Boleslav had run out. He scored his first competitive goal for Slavia on 12 April 2017 in a 5–2 Czech FA Cup win against Karviná.

Following 3 season spent in BB Erzurumspor with 96 games played across all competitions and 10 goals scored, Scuk joined İzmir-based Altay S.K. on 8 August 2020.
