= Ladislav Martan =

Czech footballer

Personal information
- Full name: Ladislav Martan
- Date of birth: 2 October 1989 (age 37)
- Place of birth: Varnsdorf, Czechoslovakia
- Height: 1.75 m (5 ft 9 in)
- Position: Striker

Team information
- Current team: FK Přepeře
- Number: 9

Youth career
- Slovan Liberec

Senior career*
Years	Team	Apps	(Gls)
2009–2013	Slovan Liberec	8	(0)
2009–2010	→ Viktoria Žižkov (loan)	21	(5)
2011–2016	Varnsdorf	113	(28)
2013	→ Slovácko (loan)	7	(0)
2016–2019	Hradec Králové	69	(3)
2019–2020	České Budějovice	15	(2)
2019	→ Viktoria Žižkov (loan)	9	(0)
2020–	FK Přepeře	52	(13)
- * Club domestic league appearances and goals as of 18:58, 23 April 2023 (UTC)

Ladislav Martan (born 2 October 1989 in Varnsdorf, Czechoslovakia) is a Czech football striker currently playing for FK Přepeře.

== Career ==
=== České Budějovice ===
Martan joined SK Dynamo České Budějovice in January 2019. On 3 September 2019, he returned to FK Viktoria Žižkov on loan for the rest of 2019.
