= Josef Bazal =

Czech footballer

Personal information
- Date of birth: 6 November 1993 (age 33)
- Place of birth: Znojmo, Czech Republic
- Height: 1.75 m (5 ft 9 in)
- Position: Winger

Team information
- Current team: Viktoria Žižkov
- Number: 17

Youth career
- Trstěnice
- Znojmo
- 2007–2014: Slavia Prague

Senior career*
Years	Team	Apps	(Gls)
2014–2017	Slavia Prague	5	(0)
2014–2015	→ Viktoria Žižkov (loan)	32	(6)
2016	→ Jihlava (loan)	12	(1)
2016	→ Jablonec (loan)	5	(0)
2017	→ 1. FK Příbram (loan)	11	(0)
2017–	Viktoria Žižkov	94	(12)
2020	→ FK Ústí nad Labem (loan)	8	(2)
- * Club domestic league appearances and goals as of 7 January 2023

Josef Bazal (born 6 November 1993) is a Czech professional footballer who plays as a winger for FK Viktoria Žižkov.

He made his senior league debut for Viktoria Žižkov on 9 March 2014 in a Czech National Football League 1–2 home loss against Sokolov. He scored his first league goals on 24 June in Žižkov's 2–0 away win at Pardubice.
