= Muris Mešanović =

Bosnian footballer (born 1990)

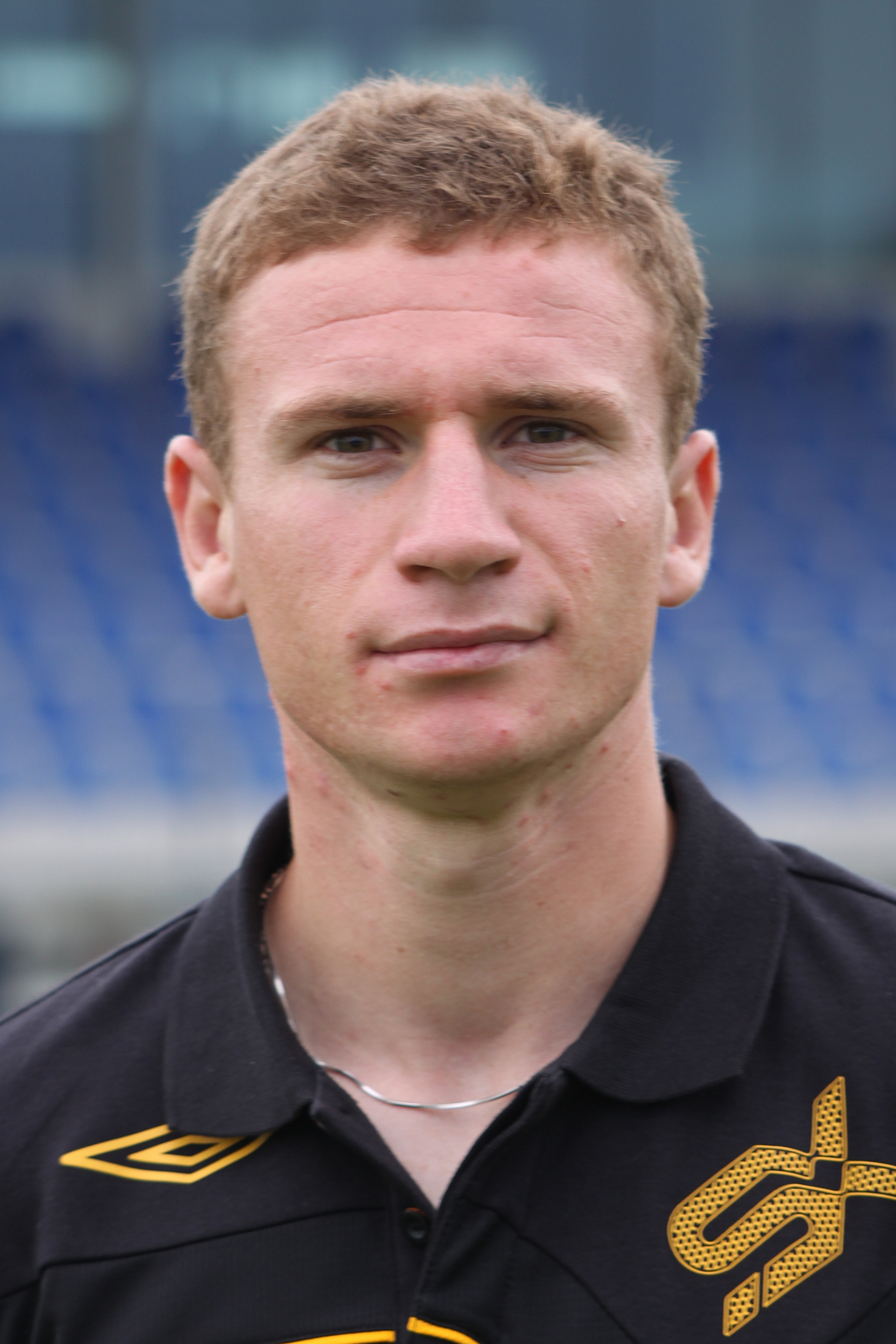

Personal information
- Date of birth: 6 July 1990 (age 36)
- Place of birth: Sarajevo, SFR Yugoslavia
- Height: 1.77 m (5 ft 9 1/2 in)
- Position: Forward

Youth career
- Radnik Hadžići
- Jablonec

Senior career*
Years	Team	Apps	(Gls)
2008–2011	Jablonec	0	(0)
2009–2010	→ Vysočina Jihlava (loan)	17	(13)
2011	→ Vysočina Jihlava (loan)	10	(3)
2011–2016	Vysočina Jihlava	86	(21)
2013	→ DAC Dunajská Streda (loan)	9	(1)
2016–2019	Slavia Prague	48	(16)
2019–2021	Mladá Boleslav	29	(13)
2020	→ Kayserispor (loan)	14	(3)
2020–2021	→ Denizlispor (loan)	36	(6)
2021–2023	Bruk-Bet Termalica	66	(20)
2023–2024	Puszcza Niepołomice	12	(0)
2024	→ Dukla Prague (loan)	13	(5)
2024–2025	Dukla Prague	19	(4)

International career
2009	Bosnia and Herzegovina U21	4	(0)
- * Club domestic league appearances and goals as of 4 January 2025

Muris Mešanović (born 6 July 1990) is a Bosnian professional footballer who plays as a forward. He represented his country at under-21 level.

== Career ==
=== Early career ===
Mešanović arrived in the Czech Republic from Bosnia in 2008. He made his league debut while on loan from Jablonec at Jihlava in the 2009–10 Czech 2. Liga, Mešanović missed the first half of the 2010–11 season due to an injury sustained in May 2010, but returned to Jihlava for a second loan period after the winter break. He scored five goals in the 2011–12 Czech 2. Liga as Jihlava won promotion to the Czech First League, and permanently joined Jihlava at the end of the season. Although he played 12 First League games in 2012–13, Mešanović did not score, and in August 2013 he joined Slovak side DAC Dunajská Streda for the first half of the 2013–14 Slovak First Football League.

=== Slavia Prague ===
Mešanović joined Slavia Prague in January 2016. During his time with Slavia, the club won two league titles.

=== Mladá Boleslav ===
In February 2019, Mešanović signed a three-year contract with Mladá Boleslav. While at Boleslav, he had two loans in Turkey. He scored 3 goals in 15 games for Kayserispor in the second half of the 2019–20 Süper Lig, before moving on loan to fellow Süper Lig side Denizlispor in August 2020.

=== Poland ===
In the summer of 2021, Mešanović and teammate Michal Hubínek left Mladá Boleslav to sign permanent deals with Polish side Bruk-Bet Termalica Nieciecza, who had just been promoted to the top-tier Ekstraklasa. After Bruk-Bet Termalica's relegation in 2023, he moved to another top-flight club Puszcza Niepołomice on a one-year contract, with an extension option.

=== Dukla Prague ===
At the start of 2024, he returned to the Czech Republic, joining Dukla Prague on loan until the end of the 2023–24 Czech National Football League. On 28 May that year, soon after Dukla clinched the league title, it was announced Mešanović would join them on a permanent basis on 1 July. On 22 July 2025, Mešanović terminated the contract with Dukla Prague due to health reasons.

== Honours ==
Slavia Prague

- Czech First League: 2016–17
- Czech Cup: 2017–18

Dukla Prague

- Czech National Football League: 2023–24
