= Josef Hušbauer =

Czech footballer (born 1990)

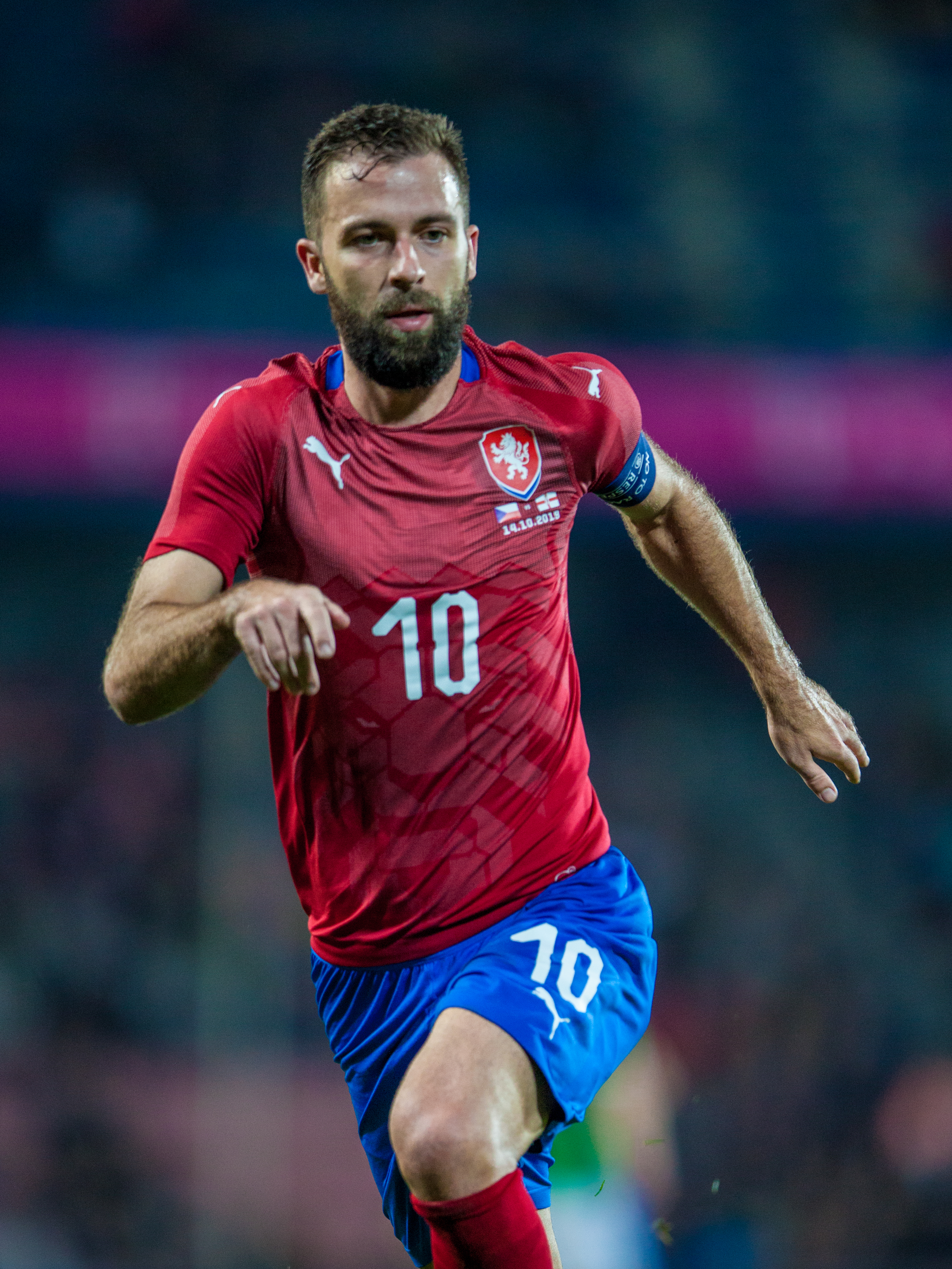
- Hušbauer with the Czech national team in 2019

Personal information
- Date of birth: 16 March 1990 (age 36)
- Place of birth: Hradištko, Czechoslovakia
- Height: 1.82 m (6 ft 0 in)
- Position: Midfielder

Team information
- Current team: Spartakos Kitiou
- Number: 22

Youth career
- 1996–2007: Sparta Prague
- 2007–2008: Jihlava

Senior career*
| Years | Team | Apps | (Gls) |
| 2008 | Jihlava | 8 | (0) |
| 2008–2010 | Viktoria Žižkov | 23 | (0) |
| 2009–2010 | → Příbram (loan) | 22 | (4) |
| 2010–2011 | Baník Ostrava | 26 | (3) |
| 2011–2015 | Sparta Prague | 97 | (33) |
| 2015 | → Cagliari (loan) | 2 | (0) |
| 2016–2020 | Slavia Prague | 122 | (22) |
| 2020 | → Dynamo Dresden (loan) | 10 | (1) |
| 2020–2022 | Anorthosis | 60 | (1) |
| 2022 | Karmiotissa | 8 | (0) |
| 2022–2023 | Ypsonas | 14 | (3) |
| 2023–2024 | Příbram | 15 | (0) |
| 2024– | Spartakos Kitiou | 14 | (2) |

International career
| 2005–2006 | Czech Republic U16 | 10 | (2) |
| 2006–2007 | Czech Republic U17 | 8 | (1) |
| 2007–2008 | Czech Republic U18 | 6 | (1) |
| 2008–2009 | Czech Republic U19 | 7 | (0) |
| 2011–2012 | Czech Republic U21 | 5 | (1) |
| 2012–2019 | Czech Republic | 21 | (1) |
- * Club domestic league appearances and goals as of 25 January 2024

Josef Hušbauer (born 16 March 1990) is a Czech professional footballer who played as a midfielder for Cypriot Second Division club Spartakos Kitiou. A product of the Sparta Prague football academy, Hušbauer represented the Czech Republic 21 times, scoring once, between 2012 and 2019.

== Club career ==
=== Sparta Prague ===
Hušbauer started his football career at Sparta Prague. He made his first league appearances in the 2007–08 Czech 2. Liga for Vysočina Jihlava. In 2008, Hušbauer was sold to FK Viktoria Žižkov, where he spent one season. For the 2009–10 season, he was sent on loan to 1. FK Příbram. In 2010, Hušbauer moved to Baník Ostrava, where he played for one season before being sold to Sparta Prague.

Hušbauer joined Italian club Cagliari on loan in January 2015. However, he only played two matches under manager Gianfranco Zola and no further first-team matches after said coach was replaced by Zdeněk Zeman, subsequently cutting his loan period short and returning to Sparta. In autumn 2015–16 Czech First League, Hušbauer dropped out of Sparta Prague first team starting eleven and played only two out of fifteen full matches.

=== Slavia Prague ===
Hušbauer signed for Sparta Prague's fierce rival Slavia Prague in December 2015 for a reported fee of 15 million CZK.

In January 2020, Hušbauer joined 2. Bundesliga club Dynamo Dresden on loan until the end of the 2019–20 season, with an option to sign him permanently.

=== Later career ===
On 24 July 2020, Hušbauer joined Cypriot club Anorthosis Famagusta on a two-year contract until May 2022. He joined another club compatriot Karmiotissa in June 2022. On 14 July 2023, Hušbauer returned to the Czech Republic and signed a contract with Příbram. On 20 July 2024, he had a third stint in Cyprus, playing for Cypriot Second Division club Spartakos Kitiou.

== International career ==
Hušbauer played for Czech youth national teams from the under-16 level. He was first called up to the Czech Republic national football team in August 2012. He made his first appearance in a goalless friendly draw against Ukraine the same month. Hušbauer scored his first international goal in an international friendly match against Finland, which finished 2–2. Between June 2014's friendly match against Austria and March 2017, he did not play for the national team.

== Career statistics ==
=== Club ===
As of 5 January 2023

Appearances and goals by club, season and competition
| Club | Season | League | | | National cup | | Continental | | Other | | Total | |
| Club | Season | Division | Apps | Goals | Apps | Goals | Apps | Goals | Apps | Goals | Apps | Goals |
|---|---|---|---|---|---|---|---|---|---|---|---|---|
| Viktoria Žižkov | 2008–09 | Czech First League | 16 | 0 | 0 | 0 | — | | — | | 16 | 0 |
| Viktoria Žižkov | 2009–10 | Czech National Football League | 7 | 0 | 0 | 0 | — | | — | | 7 | 0 |
| Viktoria Žižkov | Total | | 23 | 0 | 0 | 0 | — | | — | | 23 | 0 |
| Příbram (loan) | 2009–10 | Czech First League | 22 | 4 | 0 | 0 | — | | — | | 22 | 4 |
| Baník Ostrava | 2010–11 | Czech First League | 24 | 2 | 0 | 0 | 4 | 1 | — | | 28 | 3 |
| Baník Ostrava | 2011–12 | Czech First League | 2 | 1 | 0 | 0 | — | | — | | 2 | 1 |
| Baník Ostrava | Total | | 26 | 3 | 0 | 0 | 4 | 1 | — | | 30 | 4 |
| Sparta Prague | 2011–12 | Czech First League | 21 | 7 | 5 | 3 | — | | — | | 26 | 10 |
| Sparta Prague | 2012–13 | Czech First League | 26 | 4 | 0 | 0 | 11 | 2 | — | | 37 | 6 |
| Sparta Prague | 2013–14 | Czech First League | 29 | 18 | 5 | 2 | 2 | 0 | — | | 36 | 20 |
| Sparta Prague | 2014–15 | Czech First League | 9 | 3 | 3 | 2 | 7 | 1 | — | | 19 | 6 |
| Sparta Prague | 2015–16 | Czech First League | 12 | 1 | 2 | 0 | 5 | 1 | — | | 19 | 2 |
| Sparta Prague | Total | | 97 | 33 | 15 | 7 | 25 | 5 | — | | 137 | 44 |
| Cagliari (loan) | 2014–15 | Serie A | 2 | 0 | 1 | 0 | — | | — | | 3 | 0 |
| Slavia Prague | 2015–16 | Czech First League | 13 | 2 | 0 | 0 | — | | — | | 13 | 2 |
| Slavia Prague | 2016–17 | Czech First League | 29 | 3 | 3 | 0 | 5 | 1 | — | | 37 | 4 |
| Slavia Prague | 2017–18 | Czech First League | 29 | 3 | 3 | 1 | 6 | 2 | — | | 38 | 6 |
| Slavia Prague | 2018–19 | Czech First League | 33 | 9 | 4 | 2 | 9 | 1 | — | | 46 | 12 |
| Slavia Prague | 2019–20 | Czech First League | 18 | 5 | 1 | 0 | 5 | 0 | 1 | 1 | 25 | 6 |
| Slavia Prague | Total | | 122 | 22 | 11 | 3 | 25 | 4 | 1 | 1 | 159 | 30 |
| Dynamo Dresden | 2019–20 | 2. Bundesliga | 10 | 1 | 0 | 0 | — | | — | | 10 | 1 |
| Anorthosis | 2020–21 | Cypriot First Division | 31 | 1 | 5 | 2 | 0 | 0 | — | | 36 | 3 |
| Anorthosis | 2021–22 | Cypriot First Division | 29 | 0 | 6 | 0 | 10 | 0 | 1 | 0 | 46 | 0 |
| Anorthosis | Total | | 60 | 1 | 11 | 2 | 10 | 0 | 1 | 0 | 82 | 3 |
| Karmiotissa | 2022–23 | Cypriot First Division | 8 | 0 | 1 | 0 | — | | — | | 9 | 0 |
| Career total | | | 356 | 64 | 38 | 12 | 54 | 9 | 2 | 1 | 450 | 86 |

=== International ===
As of 14 January 2020

Appearances and goals by national team and year
| National team | Year | Apps | Goals |
|---|---|---|---|
| Czech Republic | 2012 | 2 | 0 |
| Czech Republic | 2013 | 4 | 0 |
| Czech Republic | 2014 | 3 | 1 |
| Czech Republic | 2015 | 0 | 0 |
| Czech Republic | 2016 | 0 | 0 |
| Czech Republic | 2017 | 4 | 0 |
| Czech Republic | 2018 | 4 | 0 |
| Czech Republic | 2019 | 3 | 0 |
| Total | | 20 | 1 |

As of 14 January 2020

Scores and results list the Czech Republic's goal tally first, score column indicates score after each Hušbauer goal.

List of international goals scored by Josef Hušbauer
| No. | Date | Venue | Opponent | Score | Result | Competition |
|---|---|---|---|---|---|---|
| 1 | 21 May 2014 | Olympic Stadium, Helsinki, Finland | Finland | 2–2 | 2–2 | Friendly |

== Honours ==
Sparta Prague

- Czech First League: 2013–14
- Czech Cup: 2013–14
- Czech Supercup: 2014

Slavia Prague

- Czech First League: 2016–17
- Czech Cup: 2017–18

Anorthosis

- Cypriot Cup: 2020-21

Individual

- Czech First League top goalscorer: 2013–14
