= Lukáš Železník =

Czech footballer

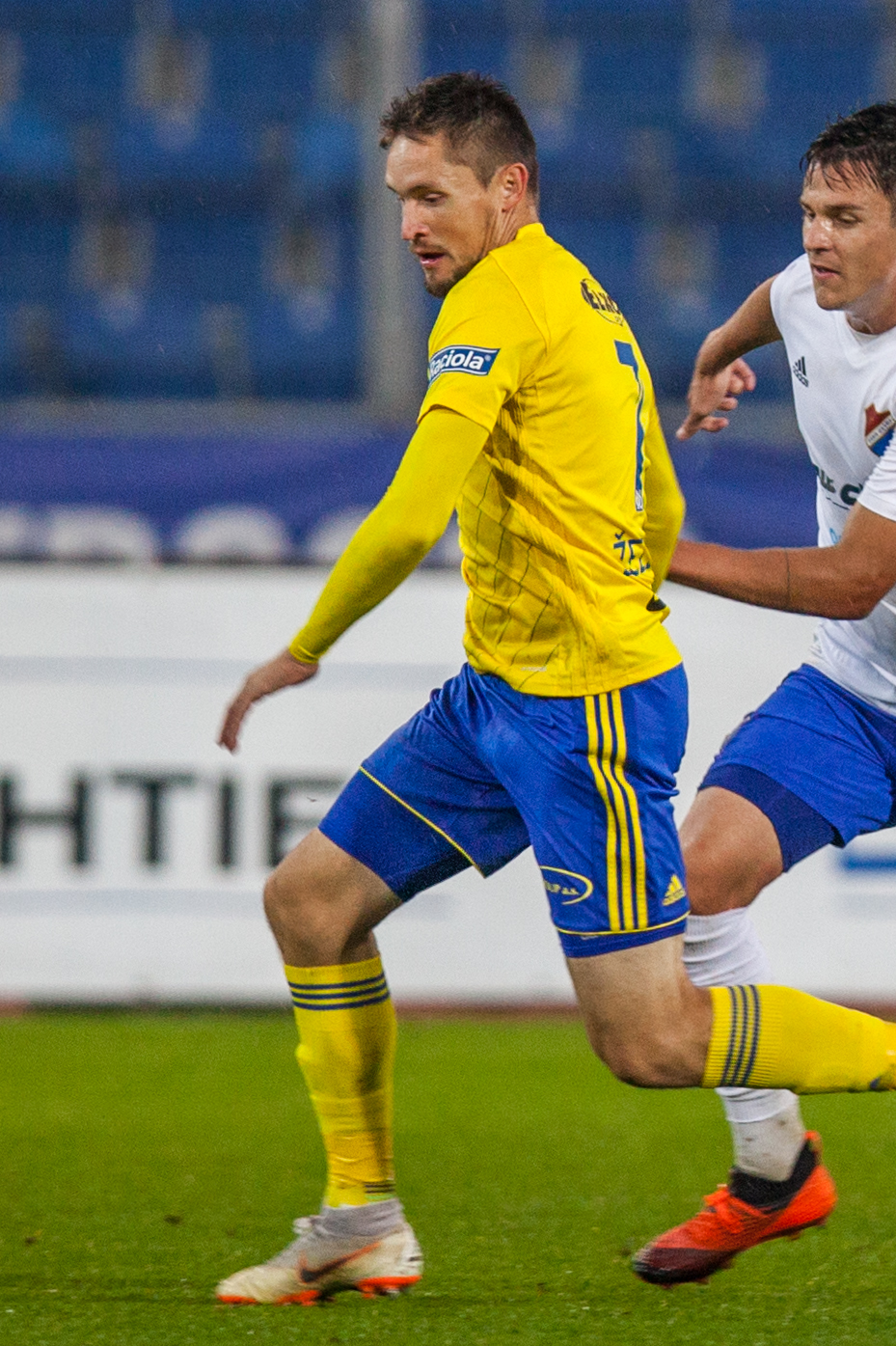

Personal information
- Date of birth: 18 June 1990 (age 36)
- Place of birth: Czechoslovakia
- Height: 1.79 m (5 ft 10 in)
- Position: Forward

Youth career
- Fastav Zlín

Senior career*
Years	Team	Apps	(Gls)
2010–2016	Fastav Zlín	82	(28)
2011	→ Hlučín (loan)	3	(0)
2016–2017	Slavia Prague	9	(0)
2017	Mladá Boleslav	12	(3)
2017–2020	Fastav Zlín	58	(4)
2020–2021	SFC Opava	10	(1)

International career
2007	Czech Republic U17	4	(0)
2007	Czech Republic U18	3	(1)
2008	Czech Republic U19	2	(0)
- * Club domestic league appearances and goals

Lukáš Železník (born 18 June 1990) is a former professional Czech football player who played in the Czech First League for SFC Opava.

He has played at youth level for his country.
