= Petr Ardeleánu =

Czech football referee

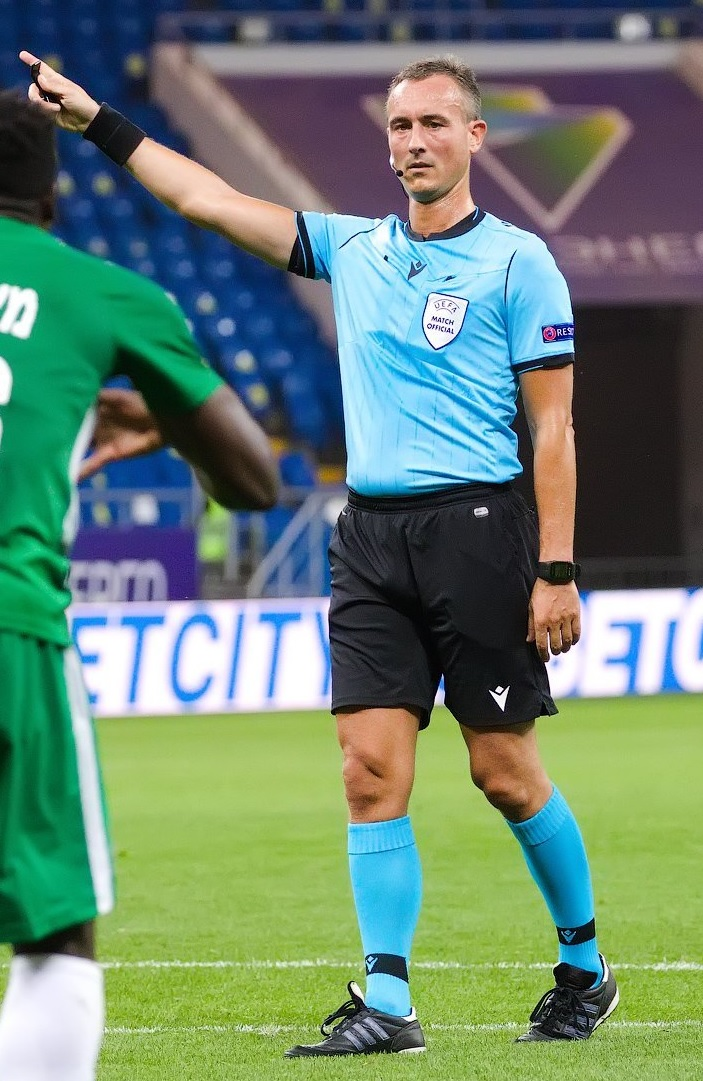
- Ardeleánu in 2020
- Born: 14 December 1980 (age 45); Czechoslovakia

Domestic
Years	League	Role
2005–	Czech National Football League	Referee
2005–	Czech First League	Referee
2018–	Czech Cup	Referee
2019–	Chinese Super League	Referee

International
Years	League	Role
2013–	FIFA listed	Referee

Petr Ardeleánu (Romanian: Petre Ardeleanu; born 14 December 1980) is a Czech football referee who officiates in the Czech First League. He has been a FIFA referee since 2013, and is ranked as a UEFA first category referee. He has Romanian and Czech ancestry.

== Refereeing career ==
In 2005, Ardeleánu began officiating in the Czech First League. In 2013, he was put on the FIFA referees list. He officiated his first senior international match on 16 October 2018 between Latvia and Georgia. In 2019, he was selected as the referee for the final of the 2018–19 Czech Cup on 22 May 2019 between Baník Ostrava and Slavia Prague. He also officiated matches in the Chinese Super League in 2019.
