= Tomáš Jablonský =

Czech footballer

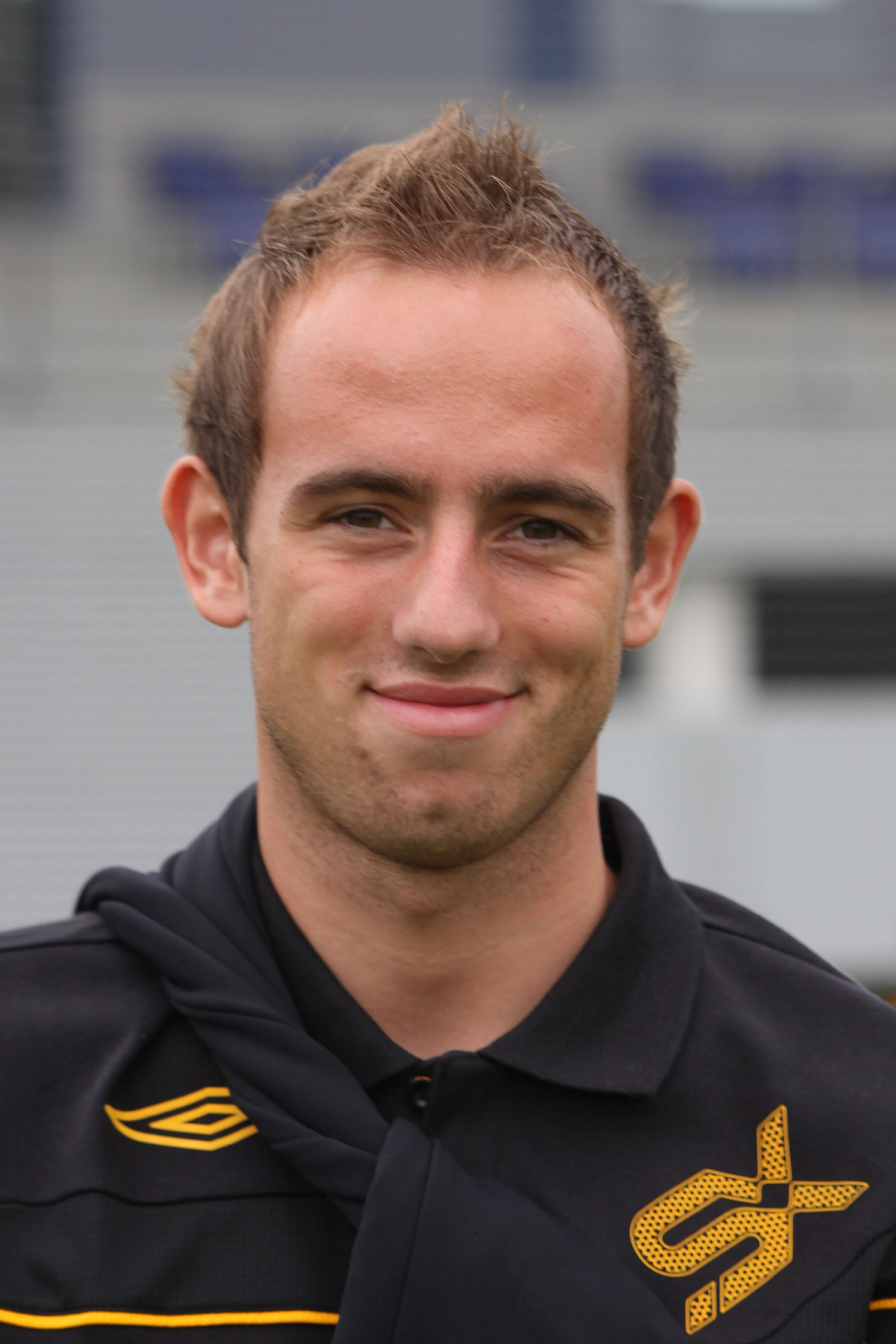

Personal information
- Full name: Tomáš Jablonský
- Date of birth: 21 June 1987 (age 39)
- Place of birth: Prague, Czechoslovakia
- Height: 1.82 m (6 ft 0 in)
- Positions: Left back; left winger

Team information
- Current team: SK Hřebeč

Youth career
- 1994–2000: TJ Háje Jižní Město
- 2000–2002: Viktoria Žižkov
- 2002–2007: Slavia Prague

Senior career*
Years	Team	Apps	(Gls)
2007–2009	Slavia Prague	14	(0)
2008	→ Kladno (loan)	14	(0)
2008	→ Bohemians (loan)	8	(0)
2009–2014	Jablonec	114	(3)
2014–2015	Slovan Bratislava	21	(0)
2015–2016	Slavia Prague	21	(0)
2017	Zbrojovka Brno	19	(0)
2018–2019	Zápy	30	(0)
2019–2021	Příbram	17	(1)
2019–2020	→ Slavoj Vyšehrad (loan)	9	(0)
2021–	SK Hřebeč		

International career
2008	Czech Republic U-21	2	(0)
- * Club domestic league appearances and goals as of 00:20, 20 February 2020 (UTC)

Tomáš Jablonský (born 21 June 1987) is a Czech football player who plays for SK Hřebeč.

Previously a left midfielder, Slavia coach Karel Jarolím moved him into defence in 2008. In June 2009, Jablonský was transferred, along with Jan Kovařík, to Jablonec in a deal that sent Adam Hloušek to Slavia Prague. On 19 January 2017 he signed a one-and-a-half-year contract with FC Zbrojovka Brno. After his spell at Brno, he retired from professional football. However, 14 months after his retirement, he signed a two-year deal with 1. FK Příbram and returned to Czech First League football.

== Honours ==
=== Club ===
Slavia Praha

- Czech First League (2): 2007–08, 2008-09

Slovan Bratislava

- Slovak Super Cup (1): 2014

Jablonec

- Czech Cup (1): 2012–13
