= Jiří Bílek =

Czech footballer (born 1983)

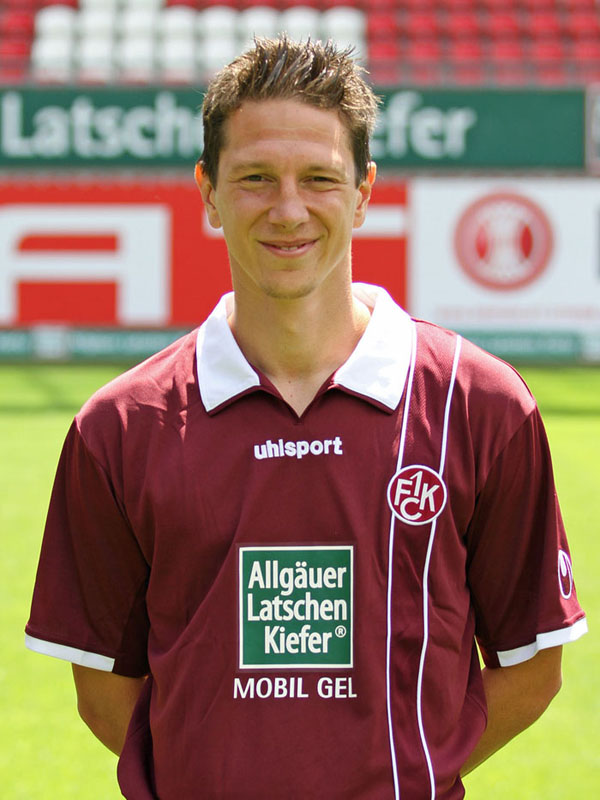
- Jiří Bílek in 2011

Personal information
- Date of birth: 4 November 1983 (age 43)
- Place of birth: Prague, Czechoslovakia
- Height: 1.86 m (6 ft 1 in)
- Position: Centre-back

Team information
- Current team: Slavia Prague (sporting director)

Youth career
- –2003: Sparta Prague

Senior career*
Years	Team	Apps	(Gls)
2001–2003	→ Spolana Neratovice (loan)		
2003–2006	Chmel Blšany	64	(1)
2006–2009	Slovan Liberec	76	(4)
2009	1. FC Kaiserslautern II	8	(0)
2009–2011	1. FC Kaiserslautern	47	(0)
2012–2014	Zagłębie Lubin	71	(1)
2014–2017	Slavia Prague	67	(7)
Total		333	(13)

International career
2002–2003	Czech Republic U20	5	(0)
2004	Czech Republic U21	2	(0)
- * Club domestic league appearances and goals

Jiří Bílek (born 4 November 1983) is a Czech former professional footballer who played as a centre-back. He is currently a member of Slavia Prague's board of directors, and serves as the club's sporting director.

== Playing career ==
Born in Prague, Bílek began his career at Sparta Prague before joining Chmel Blšany in 2003. He played in Blšany three years before being transferred to Slovan Liberec in 2006. On 7 January 2009, he signed a 3 1/2-year contract with 1. FC Kaiserslautern. He was suspended for unprofessional behaviour on 30 January 2009. He had trials with Championship side Ipswich Town, and will also spend time with Birmingham City. In January 2012, he transferred to Zagłębie Lubin.

After two years in Poland, he signed for Slavia Prague in July 2014. Despite having played as a defensive midfielder for most of his career, he moved into the centre back position in Slavia.

== Honours ==
Slovan Liberec

- Czech First League: 2005–06

Slavia Prague

- Czech First League: 2016–17
