= Radek Voltr =

Czech football player (born 1991)

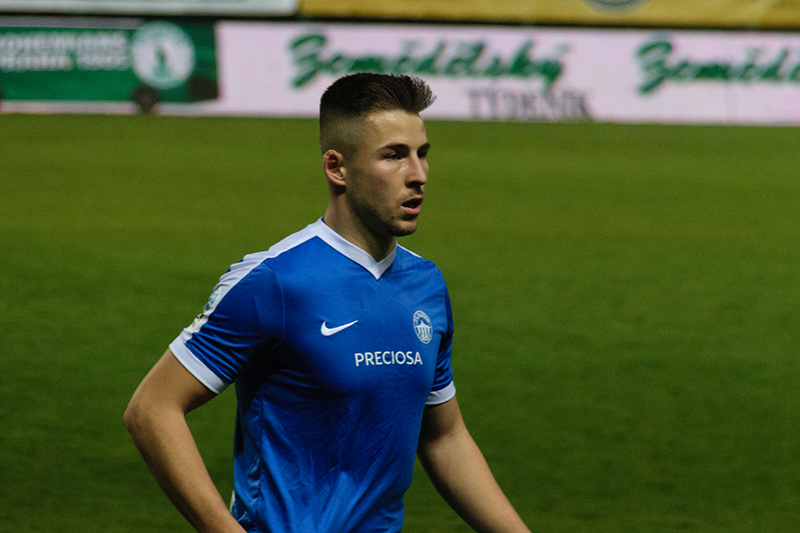

Personal information
- Date of birth: 28 November 1991 (age 34)
- Place of birth: Hradec Králové, Czechoslovakia
- Height: 1.77 m (5 ft 10 in)
- Position: Forward

Team information
- Current team: Viktoria Žižkov
- Number: 9

Senior career*
Years	Team	Apps	(Gls)
2009–2015	Hradec Králové	17	(0)
2011	→ Česká Lípa (loan)		
2011	→ Čáslav (loan)	16	(8)
2013–2015	→ Viktoria Žižkov (loan)	49	(21)
2015–2017	Slavia Prague	15	(1)
2016	→ Vysočina Jihlava (loan)	14	(0)
2016	→ MFK Karviná (loan)	11	(2)
2017–2018	Slovan Liberec	27	(2)
2018	→ Příbram (loan)	11	(1)
2019–2022	Příbram	56	(9)
2022–	Viktoria Žižkov	5	(0)

International career
2007	Czech Republic U16	2	(0)
2007	Czech Republic U17	4	(0)
2009	Czech Republic U18	2	(0)
- * Club domestic league appearances and goals as of 11 April 2022

Radek Voltr (born 28 November 1991) is a Czech football player who currently plays for Viktoria Žižkov.

== Career ==
After a half season on loan at 1. FK Příbram, Voltr signed permanently for the club on 16 January 2019.
