= Czech-Slovak Supercup =

Annual football match

- Founded: 2017; 9 years ago
- Abolished: 2020; 6 years ago
- Region: Czech Republic and Slovakia
- Teams: 2
- Related competitions: Czech Cup (qualifier); Slovak Cup (qualifier)
- Last champions: SK Slavia Prague (1st title)

The Czech-Slovak Supercup (Czech/Slovak: Česko-slovenský superpohár) was an annual football match between the winners of the Czech Cup and the Slovak Cup.

The first Czech-Slovak Supercup was held on 23 June 2017. The first champions were the Czech side Zlín.

The competition was canceled in 2020 due to the COVID-19 pandemic.

== Format ==
The Supercup was played as a single match with no extra time and a penalty shoot-out if the score is tied after 90 minutes of play. In 2017, the winner received CZK 500,000 (€19,000) in prize money, while the loser received half of that sum.

== Finals by year ==
Year	Czech-Slovak Supercup			
Year	Czech Cup winners	Result	Slovak Cup winners	Venue
2017	FC Fastav Zlín	1–1 (6–5 pen.)	ŠK Slovan Bratislava	Městský fotbalový stadion Miroslava Valenty, Uherské Hradiště, Czech Republic
2018	SK Slavia Prague	Not played	ŠK Slovan Bratislava	Štadión Pasienky, Bratislava, Slovakia
2019	SK Slavia Prague	3–0	FC Spartak Trnava	Anton Malatinský Stadium, Trnava, Slovakia
2020	AC Sparta Prague	Not played	ŠK Slovan Bratislava	not scheduled

Notes

1. The 2018 Supercup was canceled 7 days before its scheduled start due to security concerns and the Slovak FA's unwillingness to postpone the match to a later date. A separate event was created to replace it, entitled the Pohár Ferdinanda Daučíka. Slovan Bratislava won the 2018 edition 0–1.
2. The 2020 Supercup was canceled due to the COVID-19 outbreak.

== See also ==
- Czech Supercup
- Slovak Super Cup
