= 2018–19 Czech Cup =

MOL Cup

Tournament details
- Country: Czech Republic

Final positions
- Champions: Slavia Prague (5th title)
- Runners-up: Baník Ostrava

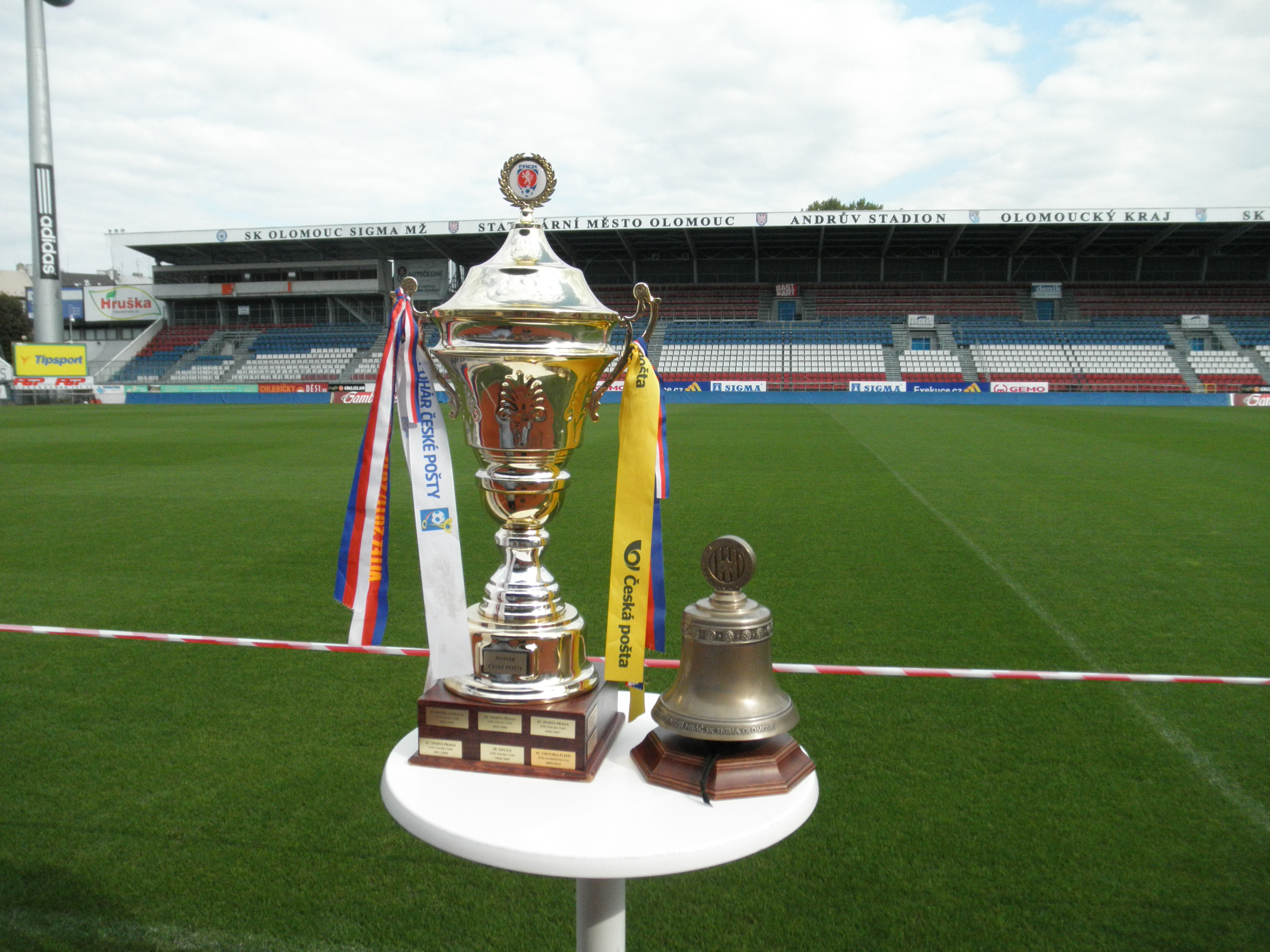
Czech Republic Football Cup at Andrův stadion in Olomouc.

The 2018–19 Czech Cup, known as the MOL Cup for sponsorship reasons, was the 26th season of the annual knockout football tournament of the Czech Republic. It began with the preliminary round in July 2018 and ended with the final in May 2019. The winner of the cup will gain the right to play in the third qualifying round of the 2019–20 UEFA Europa League.

== Teams ==
Round	Clubs remaining	Clubs involved	Winners from previous round	New entries this round	Leagues entering at this round
Preliminary round	148	92	none	92	Levels 4 and 5 in football league pyramid
First round	102	86	46	40	Czech 2. Liga; Bohemian Football League; Moravian–Silesian Football League
Second round	59	54	43	11	Czech First League – teams not playing in UEFA competitions
Third round	32	32	27	5	Czech First League – teams entered into UEFA competitions
Fourth round	16	16	16	none	none
Quarter-finals	8	8	8	none	none
Semi-finals	4	4	4	none	none
Final	2	2	2	none	none

== Preliminary round ==
92 teams competed in this round.

== First round ==
86 teams took part in this stage of the competition.

== Second round ==
54 teams participated in the second round; 11 First League teams (all other than those playing in European competitions) entered the competition at this stage, joining the 43 winners of the first round matches.

28 August 2018	Frýdek-Místek (3)	0–5	Opava (1)	Frýdek-Místek
16:30

28 August 2018	Slovan Velvary (3)	0–1	Baník Sokolov (2)	Velvary
17:00

28 August 2018	Uničov (3)	0–2	Baník Ostrava (1)	Uničov
17:00

28 August 2018	Jiskra Domažlice (3)	1–2	Táborsko (2)	Domažlice
17:00

28 August 2018	Dolní Benešov (3)	2–5	Jihlava (2)	Dolní Benešov
17:00

28 August 2018	TJ Jiskra Ústí nad Orlicí (3)	0–1	Viktoria Žižkov (2)	Ústí nad Orlicí
17:00

29 August 2018	Slavičín (4)	3–3 (a.e.t.) (5–4 p)	Znojmo (2)	Slavičín
16:00

29 August 2018	Převýšov (3)	1–2	Mladá Boleslav (1)	Převýšov
17:00

29 August 2018	Slavoj Polná (4)	2–1	Hranice (4)	Polná
17:00

29 August 2018	Olympia Radotín (3)	2–1	Hradec Králové (2)	Radotín
17:00

29 August 2018	Líšeň (3)	0–4	Karviná (1)	Brno
17:00

29 August 2018	Litoměřicko (3)	0–2	Dynamo České Budějovice (2)	Litoměřice
17:00

29 August 2018	Sokol Hostouň (4)	1–5	Loko Vltavín (3)	Hostouň
17:00

29 August 2018	Dvůr Králové nad Labem (4)	0–2	Vlašim (2)	Dvůr Králové nad Labem
17:00

29 August 2018	Dobrovice (3)	0–3	Bohemians 1905 (1)	Dobrovice
17:00

29 August 2018	Sokol Brozany (3)	1–2	Chrudim (2)	Brozany nad Ohří
17:00

29 August 2018	Benátky nad Jizerou (4)	0–2	Pardubice (2)	Benátky nad Jizerou
17:00

29 August 2018	Admira Prague (4)	0–6	Teplice (1)	Prague
17:00

4 September 2018	Vyškov (3)	3–2 (a.e.t.)	Vítkovice (2)	Vyškov
16:30

4 September 2018	Písek (3)	0–2	Dukla Prague (1)	Písek
17:00

4 September 2018	Odra Petřkovice (3)	0–4	Třinec (2)	Petřkovice
17:00

4 September 2018	Kladno (4)	1–2	Ústí nad Labem (2)	Kladno
17:00

5 September 2018	Zápy (3)	1–4	Příbram (1)	Zápy
17:00

5 September 2018	Sokol Tasovice (4)	2–5	Slovácko (1)	Tasovice
17:00

5 September 2018	Štěchovice (3)	1–5	Slovan Liberec (1)	Štěchovice
17:00

5 September 2018	Slovan Rosice (4)	0–2	Zbrojovka Brno (2)	Rosice
17:00

5 September 2018	Hanácká Slavia Kroměříž (3)	0–5	Zlín (1)	Kroměříž
18:00

== Third round ==
32 teams participated in the third round; the final five First League teams entered the competition at this stage (holders Slavia Prague, Viktoria Plzeň, Jablonec, Sigma Olomouc and Sparta Prague). They were joined by the 27 winners of the second round matches.

25 September 2018	Chrudim (2)	2–0	Mladá Boleslav (1)	Chrudim
16:00

25 September 2018	Baník Sokolov (2)	1–2	Baník Ostrava (1)	Sokolov
16:00

25 September 2018	Slavičín (4)	3–9	Zlín (1)	Slavičín
16:00

26 September 2018	Příbram (1)	4–1	Vlašim (2)	Příbram
16:00

26 September 2018	Olympia Radotín (3)	0–5	Slovácko (1)	Radotín
16:00

26 September 2018	Loko Vltavín (3)	1–2	Teplice (1)	Prague
16:00

26 September 2018	Sigma Olomouc (1)	7–0	Třinec (2)	Olomouc
17:00

26 September 2018	Zbrojovka Brno (2)	0–1	Slovan Liberec (1)	Brno
18:00

26 September 2018	Slavia Prague (1)	2–0	Ústí nad Labem (2)	Prague
18:30

2 October 2018	Slavoj Polná (4)	1–4	Sparta Prague (1)	Polná
17:00

3 October 2018	Bohemians 1905 (1)	1–0	Dynamo České Budějovice (2)	Prague
18:00

10 October 2018	Karviná (1)	2–0	Táborsko (2)	Karviná
17:00

11 October 2018	Vyškov (3)	1–5	Viktoria Plzeň (1)	Vyškov
16:00

12 October 2018	Opava (1)	1–0	Jihlava (2)	Opava
17:00

12 October 2018	Viktoria Žižkov (2)	0–1	Dukla Prague (1)	Prague
18:00

13 October 2018	Pardubice (2)	1–2	Jablonec (1)	Pardubice
16:00

== Fourth round ==
The fourth round is due to commence on 31 October 2018.

31 October 2018	Karviná (1)	1–0	Jablonec (1)	Karviná
15:30				Stadium: Městský stadion

31 October 2018	Viktoria Plzeň (1)	2–3 (a.e.t.)	Baník Ostrava (1)	Plzeň
18:00				Stadium: Doosan Arena

7 November 2018	Příbram (1)	1–2	Bohemians 1905 (1)	Příbram
16:00				Stadium: Na Litavce

15 November 2018	Sigma Olomouc (1)	2–1	Zlín (1)	Olomouc
17:00				Stadium: Andrův stadion

15 November 2018	Liberec (1)	1–0	Slovácko (1)	Liberec
17:30				Stadium: Stadion u Nisy

16 November 2018	Dukla Prague (1)	1–3	Teplice (1)	Prague
17:00				Stadium: Stadion Juliska

16 November 2018	Slavia Prague (1)	3–1	Chrudim (2)	Prague
18:30				Stadium: Eden Arena

28 November 2018	Opava (1)	0–0 (a.e.t.) (3–4 p)	Sparta Prague (1)	Opava
15:45		Report		Stadium: Stadion v Městských sadech

== Quarter-finals ==
2 April 2019	Teplice (1)	2–2 (a.e.t.) (2–4 p)	Sparta Prague (1)	Teplice
17:30	Jeřábek 90'; Hošek 100'	Report	Plavšić 75'; Drchal 120'	Stadium: Na Stinadlech; Referee: Pavel Orel
	Penalties
	Hora (penalty scored); Kučera (penalty missed); Ljevaković (penalty scored); Jindráček (penalty scored)		(penalty scored) Zahustel; (penalty scored) Frýdek; (penalty scored) Plavšić; (penalty scored) Drchal; (penalty scored) Kanga

2 April 2019	Slavia Prague (1)	5–0	Karviná (1)	Prague
17:30	Frydrych 40'; Băluță 43' van Buren 51', 67'; Hušbauer 59'	Report		Stadium: Sinobo Stadium; Attendance: 5,749; Referee: Jan Váňa

3 April 2019	Bohemians 1905 (1)	1–0	Sigma Olomouc (1)	Prague
18:00	Vaníček 77'	Report		Stadium: Ďolíček

3 April 2019	Baník Ostrava (1)	2–1 (a.e.t.)	Liberec (1)	Ostrava
18:00	Baroš 43'; O. Šašinka 102'	Report	Sýkora 16'	Attendance: 5,734; Referee: Královec

== Semi-finals ==
24 April 2019	Slavia Prague (1)	3–0	Sparta Prague (1)	Prague
19:30 CEST (UTC+02:00)	Souček 25', 45+3'; Masopust 51'	Report		Stadium: Sinobo Stadium; Attendance: 16,264; Referee: Ondej Pechanec

24 April 2019	Baník Ostrava (1)	1–0	Bohemians 1905 (1)	Ostrava
17:00 CEST (UTC+02:00)	Hrubý 12'	Report		Stadium: Městský stadion (Ostrava); Attendance: 10,712; Referee: Emanuel Marek

== Final ==
22 May 2019	Baník Ostrava (1)	0–2	Slavia Prague (1)	Olomouc
19:15 CEST (UTC+02:00)		Report	Souček 36' (pen.); Masopust 78'	Stadium: Andrův Stadion; Attendance: 11,661; Referee: Petr Ardeleánu

== See also ==
- 2018–19 Czech First League
- 2018–19 Czech National Football League
