= Jaroslav Mihalík =

Slovak international footballer

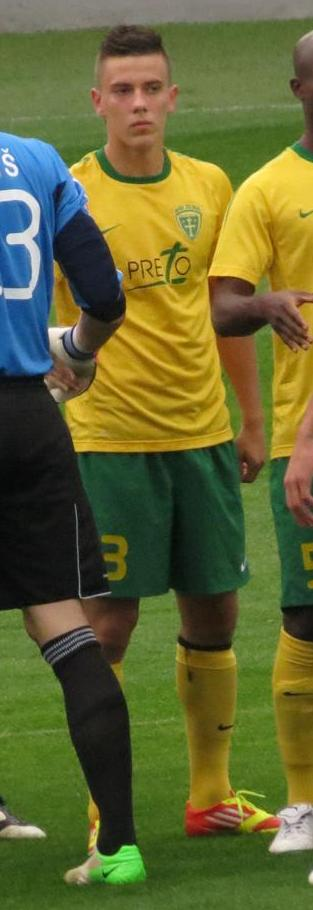

Personal information
- Full name: Jaroslav Mihalík
- Date of birth: 27 July 1994 (age 32)
- Place of birth: Spišská Nová Ves, Slovakia
- Height: 1.80 m (5 ft 11 in)
- Position: Winger

Team information
- Current team: FILJO Ladomerská Vieska

Youth career
- Spišská Nová Ves
- Žilina

Senior career*
| Years | Team | Apps | (Gls) |
| 2011–2016 | Žilina | 102 | (23) |
| 2016–2017 | Slavia Prague | 20 | (2) |
| 2017 | → Cracovia (loan) | 10 | (1) |
| 2017–2021 | Cracovia | 14 | (0) |
| 2018–2019 | → Žilina (loan) | 40 | (9) |
| 2019–2020 | → Lechia Gdańsk (loan) | 26 | (3) |
| 2021 | → Sigma Olomouc (loan) | 10 | (1) |
| 2021–2022 | Maccabi Petah Tikva | 12 | (0) |
| 2022 | Pohronie | 11 | (2) |
| 2022 | Skalica | 12 | (1) |
| 2023 | Karviná | 4 | (0) |
| 2024– | FILJO Ladomerská Vieska | | |

International career
| 2010–2011 | Slovakia U17 | 2 | (0) |
| 2010–2013 | Slovakia U19 | 3 | (0) |
| 2013–2017 | Slovakia U21 | 18 | (4) |
| 2017–2020 | Slovakia | 8 | (1) |
- * Club domestic league appearances and goals as of 21:48, 23 January 2024 (UTC)

Jaroslav Mihalík (born 27 July 1994) is a Slovak footballer who plays as a winger for FILJO Ladomerská Vieska.

He signed for Slavia Prague from Žilina in January 2016 for a fee of €650,000. He made 20 league appearances and scored two goals in the next 12 months, before joining Cracovia on loan with an option to buy.

== International career ==
Mihalík was an important part of Slovakia's squad at the 2017 UEFA European Under-21 Championship, where Mihalík scored Slovakia's second goal in the final group stage match against Sweden, contributing to a 3–0 victory. He was in the starting line-up of all three games of Slovakia in the group stage.

Mihalík was first called up to Slovakia's senior national football team in September 2017, for a double qualification matchday in a 2018 FIFA World Cup qualifying campaign, by Ján Kozák. He did not make a cap in a game against Slovenia or England, but he was also called up for the October double matchday, making his debut against Malta, on 8 October 2017, substituting Albert Rusnák in the 87th minute. Slovakia won the game 3–0 and regained the 2nd place in Group F. By the end of the year, he was capped again in a friendly match against Norway, coming on as a substitute in the second half.

In 2018, he was substituted into friendly matches against UAE and Netherlands, but lost the spot in the national team for the debut edition of the UEFA Nations League.

He regained the spot in the national team in the second nomination of the new Czech-born coach Pavel Hapal, in the March 2019 squad for a double UEFA Euro 2020 qualifying fixture against Hungary and Wales. In June's friendly fixture, on 7 June 2019, against Jordan, Mihalík scored his first international goal for the senior team at Štadión Antona Malatinského in Trnava. Although Slovakia was one down at half time, after a goal from Musa Al-Taamari, Slovakia managed to score 5 in the second half to settle the score at 5–1. Mihalík scored Slovakia's last goal in the 84th minute, after a pass by a former team-mate from MŠK Žilina, László Bénes. Mihalík however did not appear 4 days later in Baku, in a qualifier against Azerbaijan (5–1 win).

== Career statistics ==
=== International ===
Appearances and goals by national team and year
| National team | Year | Apps | Goals |
|---|---|---|---|
| Slovakia | 2017 | 2 | 0 |
| Slovakia | 2018 | 2 | 0 |
| Slovakia | 2019 | 2 | 1 |
| Slovakia | 2020 | 2 | 0 |
| Total | | 8 | 1 |

Scores and results list Slovakia's goal tally first, score column indicates score after each Mihalík goal.

List of international goals scored by Jaroslav Mihalík
| No. | Date | Venue | Opponent | Score | Result | Competition |
|---|---|---|---|---|---|---|
| 1 | 7 June 2019 | Anton Malatinský Stadium, Trnava, Slovakia | Jordan | 5–1 | 5–1 | Friendly |

== Honours ==
Žilina

- Slovak First Football League: 2011–12
- Slovak Cup: 2011–12

Slovakia

- King's Cup: 2018
