= 2016–17 FC Zbrojovka Brno season =

Zbrojovka Brno
2016–17 season
- Chairman: Václav Bartoňek
- Manager: Svatopluk Habanec
- Stadium: Městský fotbalový stadion Srbská
- Czech First League: 11th
- Czech Cup: Quarter-finals
Home colours	Away colours	Third colours

The 2016–17 FC Zbrojovka Brno season was the 104th season in club history.

== Squad ==
=== Current squad ===
As of 3 July 2016.

Note: Flags indicate national team as defined under FIFA eligibility rules; some limited exceptions apply. Players may hold more than one non-FIFA nationality.

No.	Pos.	Nation	Player
1	GK	CZE	Dušan Melichárek
6	DF	SRB	Mihailo Jovanović
7	MF	CZE	Pavel Zavadil (Captain)
8	MF	CZE	Jan Polák
9	FW	SVK	Tomáš Brigant
11	FW	CZE	Stanislav Vávra
15	DF	CZE	Jakub Šural
16	MF	CZE	Tomáš Weber
17	GK	CZE	Pavel Halouska
19	MF	CZE	Milan Lutonský
20	GK	CZE	Vlastimil Veselý
23	FW	CZE	Michal Škoda
24	MF	CZE	Alois Hyčka
25	MF	CZE	David Pašek

No.	Pos.	Nation	Player
26	MF	CZE	Radek Buchta
29	MF	CZE	Jakub Kučera
28	MF	SVK	Matúš Lacko
37	FW	CZE	Jakub Řezníček
—	DF	CZE	Jiří Janoščin
—	DF	LTU	Tadas Kijanskas
—	DF	SLO	Boštjan Frelih
—	DF	CZE	Jan Sedlák
—	MF	CZE	Jan Štohanzl
—	FW	CGO	Francis Litsingi
—	FW	CZE	David Štrombach
—	FW	CZE	Jakub Přichystal
—	FW	CZE	Jindřich Stehlík

== Transfers ==
=== In ===
No.	Pos.	Name	NAT	Age	Moving from	Type	Transfer Window	Sources
	MF	Jan Polák	Czech Republic	35	1. FC Nürnberg	Transfer	Summer	
	MF	Jan Štohanzl	Czech Republic	31	SK Slavia Praha	Transfer	Summer	
	DF	Tadas Kijanskas	Lithuania	30	Hapoel Haifa F.C.	Transfer	Summer	
	FW	Francis Litsingi	Republic of the Congo	29	AC Sparta Prague	Loan	Summer	
	DF	Lukáš Vraštil	Czech Republic	24	FK Mladá Boleslav	Transfer	Summer	
	FW	Petr Rybička	Czech Republic	20	MFK Chrudim	Transfer	Summer	
	MF	Jan Sedlák	Czech Republic	21	MFK Karviná	Loan return	Summer	
	DF	Jiří Janoščin	Czech Republic	23	FK Fotbal Třinec	Loan return	Summer	
	DF	Boštjan Frelih	Slovenia	23	NK Inter Zaprešić	Loan return	Summer	
	MF	Tomáš Weber	Czech Republic	20	1. SC Znojmo	Loan return	Summer	
	FW	Jakub Přichystal	Czech Republic	20	SFC Opava	Loan return	Summer	
	FW	David Štrombach	Czech Republic	20	MFK Skalica	Loan return	Summer	

=== Out ===
No.	Pos.	Name	NAT	Age	Moving to	Type	Transfer Window
	DF	Pavel Košťál	Czech Republic	35	FK Senica	End of contract	Summer
	DF	Miroslav Keresteš	Slovakia	26	FK Mladá Boleslav	Transfer	Summer
	DF	Aleš Schuster	Czech Republic	34	1. SK Prostějov	End of contract	Summer
	DF	Petr Buchta	Czech Republic	23	Unknown	End of contract	Summer
	MF	Jan Malík	Czech Republic	24	PFC Cherno More Varna	End of contract	Summer

== Friendly matches ==
Win Draw Loss

25 June 2016	FK Blansko (Czech Republic)	0 – 3	FC Zbrojovka Brno	Blansko
17:30 CEST (UTC+02)		Match Report	41' Stratil; 51' Přichystal; 80' Štrombach	Attendance: 313; Referee: Sedlář – Hlubinka, Nejezchleb

6 July 2016	FC Vysočina Jihlava (Czech Republic)	1 – 2	FC Zbrojovka Brno	Jihlava
17:00 CEST (UTC+02)	70' Batioja	Match Report	5' Řezníček; 71' Vávra	Stadium: Stadion v Jiráskově ulici Attendance: 300; Referee: Orel – Dobrovolný, Starý

9 July 2016	FC Zbrojovka Brno	2 – 2	SFC Opava (Czech Republic)	Brno–Bosonohy
11:00 CEST (UTC+02)	54' Litsingi; 72' Vávra	Match Report	3' Machálek; 71' Šural o.g.	Attendance: 420; Referee: Zelinka

== Competitions ==
=== Overview ===
Competition	First match	Last match	Starting round	Final position	Record							
Competition	First match	Last match	Starting round	Final position	Pld	W	D	L	GF	GA	GD	Win %
Czech First League	6 August 2016	27 May 2017	Matchday 1	11th	30	6	14	10	32	45	−13	20.00
Czech Cup	10 August 2016	26 March 2017	Second round	Quarter-finals	4	3	0	1	10	5	+5	75.00
Total					34	9	14	11	42	50	−8	26.47

Source: Competitions

=== Czech First League ===
==== League table ====
Pos	Team	Pld	W	D	L	GF	GA	GD	Pts
9	Slovan Liberec	30	10	9	11	31	28	+3	39 (Note: Head-to-head record: Slovan 1–1 Jablonec, Jablonec 3–0 Slovan.)
10	Karviná	30	9	7	14	39	49	−10	34
11	Zbrojovka Brno	30	6	14	10	32	45	−13	32 (Note: Head-to-head record: Zbrojovka 1–0 Slovácko, Slovácko 0–0 Zbrojovka .)
12	Slovácko	30	6	14	10	29	38	−9	32
13	Bohemians 1905	30	7	7	16	22	39	−17	28

Source: Fortuna liga, Soccerway
Rules for classification: 1) Points; 2) Head-to-head points; 3) Head-to-head goal difference; 4) Head-to-head goals scored; 5) Goal difference; 6) Goals scored; 7) Play-off (only if deciding champion, UEFA competitions, or relegation); 8) Draw.

==== Results summary ====
Overall								Home						Away					
Pld	W	D	L	GF	GA	GD	Pts	W	D	L	GF	GA	GD	W	D	L	GF	GA	GD
30	6	14	10	32	45	−13	32	4	8	3	17	16	+1	2	6	7	15	29	−14

Source: Fortuna Liga

==== Matches ====
6 August 2016 2	Karviná	1–1	Zbrojovka Brno	Karviná
17:00 CEST (UTC+2)	Jurčo 28'	Report	Řezníček 37'	Stadium: Městský stadion Attendance: 4,522; Referee: Radek Příhoda

13 August 2016 3	Zbrojovka Brno	0–0	Teplice	Brno
17:15 CEST (UTC+2)		Report		Stadium: Městský fotbalový stadion Srbská; Attendance: 4,228; Referee: Pavel Franěk

21 August 2016 4	Slovan Liberec	0–0	Zbrojovka Brno	Liberec
17:00 CEST (UTC+2)		Report		Stadium: Stadion u Nisy; Attendance: 4,054; Referee: Jiří Houdek

27 August 2016 5	Zbrojovka Brno	1–0	Slovácko	Brno
18:00 CEST (UTC+2)	Polák 47'	Report		Stadium: Městský fotbalový stadion Srbská; Attendance: 4,322; Referee: Karel Hrubeš

11 September 2016 6	Bohemians 1905	3–0	Zbrojovka Brno	Prague
15:00 CEST (UTC+2)	Hašek 27'; Šmíd 32'; Havel 45'	Report		Stadium: Ďolíček; Attendance: 4,329; Referee: Miroslav Zelinka

17 September 2016 7	Zbrojovka Brno	1–1	Hradec Králové	Brno
16:00 CEST (UTC+2)	Škoda 80'	Report	Plašil 88'	Stadium: Městský fotbalový stadion Srbská; Attendance: 3,821; Referee: Martin Nenadál

24 September 2016 8	Dukla Prague	4–2	Zbrojovka Brno	Prague
15:00 CEST (UTC+2)	Beauguel 2'; Štetina 11', 69'; Juroška 63'	Report	Škoda 37', 46'	Stadium: Stadion Juliska; Attendance: 1,432; Referee: Jan Machálek

2 October 2016 9	Zbrojovka Brno	3–3	Sparta Prague	Brno
14:30 CEST (UTC+2)	Škoda 4'; Přichystal 80'; Hyčka 90'	Report	Mazuch 34'; Dočkal 42'; Pulkrab 88'	Stadium: Městský fotbalový stadion Srbská; Attendance: 9,223; Referee: Pavel Královec

15 October 2016 10	Jablonec	1–2	Zbrojovka Brno	Jablonec nad Nisou
17:00 CEST (UTC+2)	Doležal 28'	Report	Škoda 8'; Řezníček 46'	Stadium: Stadion Střelnice; Attendance: 1,546; Referee: Petr Ardeleánu

19 October 2016 1	Zbrojovka Brno	1–4	Slavia Prague	Brno
18:00 CEST (UTC+2)	Přichystal 26'	Report	Barák 9', 47'; Frydrych 59'; Škoda 66'	Stadium: Městský fotbalový stadion Srbská; Attendance: 8,818; Referee: Pavel Franěk
Note: The match was originally scheduled for 31 July 2016, but was postponed due to heavy rain.

22 October 2016 11	Mladá Boleslav	3–3	Zbrojovka Brno	Mladá Boleslav
17:00 CEST (UTC+2)	Přikryl 32'; da Silva 63'; Mareš 79'	Report	Řezníček 18'; Fleišman 72' (o.g.); Škoda 90'	Stadium: Městský stadion Attendance: 2,931; Referee: Jan Jílek

29 October 2016 12	Zbrojovka Brno	1–1	Vysočina Jihlava	Brno
17:00 CEST (UTC+2)	Škoda 79'	Report	Dvořák 42'	Stadium: Městský fotbalový stadion Srbská; Attendance: 3 ,526; Referee: Radek Příhoda

5 November 2016 13	Fastav Zlín	2–1	Zbrojovka Brno	Zlín
15:00 CET (UTC+1)	Harba 29'; Štípek 65'	Report	Škoda 69'	Stadium: Letná Stadion; Attendance: 4,621; Referee: Jiří Houdek

19 November 2016 14	Zbrojovka Brno	2–2	Příbram	Brno
15:00 CET (UTC+1)	Škoda 37', 44'	Report	T. Pilík 22' (pen.); Brandner 80'	Stadium: Městský fotbalový stadion Srbská; Attendance: 2,988; Referee: Zbyněk Proske

27 November 2016 15	Viktoria Plzeň	2–0	Zbrojovka Brno	Plzeň
18:30 CET (UTC+1)	Krmenčík 22'; Ďuriš 75'	Report		Stadium: Doosan Arena; Attendance: 8,812; Referee: Ondřej Berka

3 December 2016 16	Zbrojovka Brno	1–1	Karviná	Brno
15:00 CET (UTC+1)	Vraštil 90'	Report	Šisler 47'	Stadium: Městský fotbalový stadion Srbská; Attendance: 2,949; Referee: Petr Ardeleánu

18 February 2017 17	Teplice	1–1	Zbrojovka Brno	Teplice
15:30 CET (UTC+1)	Fillo 21'	Report	Vondrášek 34' (o.g.)	Stadium: Na Stínadlech; Attendance: 2,516; Referee: Jan Machálek

25 February 2017 18	Zbrojovka Brno	1–0	Slovan Liberec	Brno
16:00 CET (UTC+1)	Řezníček 80'	Report		Stadium: Městský fotbalový stadion Srbská; Attendance: 3,818; Referee: Radek Příhoda

4 March 2017 19	Slovácko	0–0	Zbrojovka Brno	Uherské Hradiště
15:00 CET (UTC+1)		Report		Stadium: Městský fotbalový stadion Miroslava Valenty; Attendance: 5,019; Referee: Pavel Franěk

11 March 2017 20	Zbrojovka Brno	0–0	Bohemians 1905	Brno
15:30 CET (UTC+1)		Report		Stadium: Městský fotbalový stadion Srbská; Attendance: 5,016; Referee: Ondřej Pechanec

19 March 2017 21	Hradec Králové	0–0	Zbrojovka Brno	Hradec Králové
15:00 CET (UTC+1)		Report		Stadium: Všesportovní stadion Attendance: 1,931; Referee: Zbyněk Proske

1 April 2017 22	Zbrojovka Brno	0–0	Dukla Prague	Brno
17:00 CEST (UTC+2)		Report		Stadium: Městský fotbalový stadion Srbská; Attendance: 3,216; Referee: Ondřej Ginzel

9 April 2017 23	Sparta Prague	3–2	Zbrojovka Brno	Prague
17:30 CEST (UTC+2)	Kadlec 6'; Lafata 40', 54' (pen.)	Report	Polák 30'; Tashchy 58'	Stadium: Generali Arena; Attendance: 8,997; Referee: Jan Jílek

15 April 2017 24	Zbrojovka Brno	2–0	Jablonec	Brno
15:00 CEST (UTC+2)	Tashchy 17'; Řezníček 76'	Report		Stadium: Městský fotbalový stadion Srbská; Attendance: 3,133; Referee: Radek Příhoda

22 April 2017 25	Zbrojovka Brno	2–3	Mladá Boleslav	Brno
17:00 CEST (UTC+2)	Přichystal 16'; Zavadil 64'	Report	Mebrahtu 29', 60' (pen.), 65'	Stadium: Městský fotbalový stadion Srbská; Attendance: 2,918; Referee: Petr Ardeleánu

28 April 2017 26	Vysočina Jihlava	3–0	Zbrojovka Brno	Jihlava
18:00 CEST (UTC+2)	Zoubele 49'; Fulnek 75'; Ikaunieks 89'	Report		Stadium: Stadion v Jiráskově ulici Attendance: 2,249; Referee: Pavel Orel

7 May 2017 27	Zbrojovka Brno	2–0	Fastav Zlín	Brno
17:00 CEST (UTC+2)	Řezníček 45'; Pavlík 65'	Report		Stadium: Městský fotbalový stadion Srbská; Attendance: 4,418; Referee: Karel Hrubeš

13 May 2017 28	Příbram	2–3	Zbrojovka Brno	Příbram
15:00 CEST (UTC+2)	T. Pilík 19'; P. Pilík 90'	Report	Zavadil 38'; Lutonský 67'; Řezníček 76'	Stadium: Na Litavce; Attendance: 2,128; Referee: Pavel Franěk

20 May 2017 29	Zbrojovka Brno	0–1	Viktoria Plzeň	Brno
17:00 CEST (UTC+2)		Report	Krmenčík 90'	Stadium: Městský fotbalový stadion Srbská; Attendance: 6,158; Referee: Pavel Orel

27 May 2017 30	Slavia Prague	4–0	Zbrojovka Brno	Prague
17:00 CEST (UTC+2)	Frydrych 27'; Tecl 30', 57'; Ngadeu-Ngadjui 68'	Report		Stadium: Stadion Evžena Rošického; Attendance: 12,300; Referee: Zbyněk Proske

=== Czech Cup ===
10 August 2016 Second round	Slavičín	1–3	Zbrojovka Brno	Slavičín
17:00 CEST (UTC+2)	Matůš 82'	Report	Litsingi 10'; Vraštil 38'; Vávra 70'	Stadium: Stadion FC TVD Slavičín; Attendance: 600; Referee: Dresler

21 September 2016 Third round	Ústí nad Labem	1–4	Zbrojovka Brno	Ústí nad Labem
17:00 CEST (UTC+2)	Procházka 38'	Report	Řezníček 41', 80'; Pašek 49'; Hyčka 83'	Stadium: Městský stadion Attendance: 858; Referee: Ondřej Ginzel

26 October 2016 Fourth round	Zbrojovka Brno	2–1	Vysočina Jihlava	Brno
17:00 CEST (UTC+2)	Řezníček 38'; Škoda 51' (pen.)	Report	Rosa 57'	Stadium: Městský fotbalový stadion Srbská; Attendance: 1,230; Referee: Josef Váňa

26 March 2017 Quarter-finals	Opava	2–1	Zbrojovka Brno	Opava
12:15 CEST (UTC+2)	Janetzký 65'; Schaffartzik 76'	Report	Řezníček 45'	Stadium: Stadion v Městských sadech Referee: Ondřej Berka
