= 2014–15 FC Zbrojovka Brno season =

FC Zbrojovka Brno
2014–15 season
- President: Václav Bartoněk
- Manager: Václav Kotal
- Stadium: Městský fotbalový stadion Srbská
- Czech First League: 14th
- Czech Cup: Third round
- Top goalscorer: League: Pavel Zavadil (5); All: Three players (5)
Home colours	Away colours	Third colours

The 2014–15 FC Zbrojovka Brno season is the club's 21st season in the Czech First League. The team is competing in Czech First League and the Czech Cup.

== First team squad ==
As of 20 March 2015.

Note: Flags indicate national team as defined under FIFA eligibility rules; some limited exceptions apply. Players may hold more than one non-FIFA nationality.

No.	Pos.	Nation	Player
1	GK	CZE	Dušan Melichárek (on loan from Zaprešić)
3	DF	CZE	Petr Buchta
4	DF	CZE	Jakub Jugas (on loan from Zlín)
6	FW	CZE	Josef Čtvrtníček
7	MF	CZE	Pavel Zavadil (captain)
8	DF	CZE	Jan Malík
9	FW	SRB	Miroslav Marković
10	MF	CZE	Lukáš Zoubele
11	FW	CZE	Stanislav Vávra
14	DF	CZE	Pavel Košťál
15	MF	CZE	Jan Sýkora (on loan from Sparta)
16	MF	CZE	Šimon Šumbera
17	GK	CZE	Václav Hladký

No.	Pos.	Nation	Player
18	MF	CZE	Roman Fischer (on loan from Senica)
19	MF	CZE	Milan Lutonský
20	GK	CZE	Vlastimil Veselý
22	DF	CZE	Aleš Schuster
23	FW	SVK	Fabián Slančík
24	DF	CZE	Alois Hyčka
25	MF	CZE	David Pašek
26	MF	CZE	Radek Buchta
27	FW	FRA	Donneil Moukanza
28	FW	SVK	Tomáš Brigant
30	DF	SVK	Miroslav Keresteš
--	MF	SVK	Kamil Kopúnek

=== In affiliated clubs ===
As of 20 February 2015.

Note: Flags indicate national team as defined under FIFA eligibility rules; some limited exceptions apply. Players may hold more than one non-FIFA nationality.

No.	Pos.	Nation	Player
—	MF	CZE	Daniel Přerovský (at Líšeň)
—	MF	CZE	David Jukl (at Blansko)
—	FW	CZE	Jindřich Stehlík (at Líšeň)
—	FW	CZE	Ondřej Ullmann (at Blansko)

No.	Pos.	Nation	Player
—	FW	CZE	Martin Levai (at Blansko)
—	FW	CZE	Jakub Krejčíř (at Blansko)
—	FW	CZE	Tomáš Sodomka (at Blansko)

=== Out on loan ===
As of 20 February 2015.

Note: Flags indicate national team as defined under FIFA eligibility rules; some limited exceptions apply. Players may hold more than one non-FIFA nationality.

No.	Pos.	Nation	Player
—	GK	CZE	Jan Zádrapa (at Břeclav)
—	DF	BIH	Muamer Avdić (at Most)
—	MF	SEN	Lamine Fall (at Most)
—	DF	CZE	Jakub Šural (at Most)
—	MF	CZE	Martin Sus (at Prostějov)
—	DF	CZE	Jiří Janoščin (at Třinec)
—	DF	CZE	Pavel Drbal (at HFK Olomouc)
—	DF	CZE	Tadeáš Zezula (at Břeclav)
—	MF	CZE	Rostislav Varaďa (at HFK Olomouc)

No.	Pos.	Nation	Player
—	MF	CZE	Dalibor Dvořák (at HFK Olomouc)
—	MF	CZE	Tomáš Kunc (at Břeclav)
—	MF	CZE	Michal Kugler (at Břeclav)
—	MF	CZE	Jakub Dvořák (at Bystrc)
—	FW	CZE	Karel Kroupa (at Prostějov)
—	FW	CZE	Michal Škoda (at České Budějovice)
—	FW	CZE	Pavel Lapeš (at Břeclav)
—	FW	CZE	Milan Halaška (at Frýdek-Místek)
—	MF	GUI	Mohamed Traoré (at AFK Tišnov)

== Competitions ==
Win Draw Loss

=== Overview ===
Competition	First match	Last match	Starting round	Final position	Record							
Competition	First match	Last match	Starting round	Final position	Pld	W	D	L	GF	GA	GD	Win %
Fortuna liga	26 July 2014	30 May 2015	Matchday 1	Matchday 34	30	9	6	15	34	45	−11	30.00
Česká Pošta Cup	13 August 2014	8 October 2014	Second round	Third round	2	1	0	1	4	1	+3	50.00
Total					32	10	6	16	38	46	−8	31.25

Last updated: 30 May 2015
Source: Competitions

=== Czech First League ===
==== Results summary ====
Overall								Home						Away					
Pld	W	D	L	GF	GA	GD	Pts	W	D	L	GF	GA	GD	W	D	L	GF	GA	GD
30	9	6	15	34	45	−11	33	6	3	6	20	17	+3	3	3	9	14	28	−14

Last updated: 30 May 2015.

==== Results by round ====
Round	1	2	3	4	5	6	7	8	9	10	11	12	13	14	15	16	17	18	19	20	21	22	23	24	25	26	27	28	29	30
Ground	A	H	A	H	A	H	A	H	H	A	H	A	H	A	H	A	H	A	H	A	H	A	A	H	A	H	A	H	A	H
Result	L	W	D	D	L	D	W	W	L	L	L	L	L	D	W	L	L	W	D	W	W	L	L	W	L	W	D	L	L	L
Position	16	6	6	8	11	12	10	7	9	9	10	13	14	15	13	14	14	11	12	11	8	9	11	10	11	10	10	11	12	14

Updated to match(es) played on 30 May 2015. Source:
A = Away; H = Home; W = Win; D = Draw; L = Loss

==== League table ====
Pos	Team	Pld	W	D	L	GF	GA	GD	Pts	Qualification or relegation
12	Slovan Liberec	30	7	12	11	39	43	−4	33 (Note: Slovan Liberec ahead of Baník Ostrava and Zbrojovka Brno on head-to-head record; Slovan Liberec 7 pts, Baník Ostrava 5 pts, Zbrojovka Brno 4 pts.)	Qualification for the Europa League third qualifying round (Note: Slovan Liberec won the 2014–15 Czech Cup and qualified for the third qualifying round of the UEFA Europa League.)
13	Baník Ostrava	30	8	9	13	23	41	−18	33	
14	Zbrojovka Brno	30	9	6	15	34	45	−11	33	
15	Hradec Králové (R)	30	6	7	17	26	52	−26	25	Relegation to FNL
16	Dynamo České Budějovice (R)	30	5	7	18	29	72	−43	22	Relegation to FNL

Source: Fortuna liga
Rules for classification: 1) Points; 2) Head-to-head points; 3) Head-to-head goal difference; 4) Head-to-head goals scored; 5) Goal difference; 6) Goals scored; 7) Play-off (only if deciding champion, UEFA competitions, or relegation); 8) Draw.
(R) Relegated

=== Results ===
26 July 2014 1	Jablonec	2–0	Zbrojovka Brno	Jablonec nad Nisou
17:00 CEST (UTC+2)	Čížek 37'; Pospíšil 87'	Report	Hladký (yellow card) 32'	Stadium: Chance Arena; Attendance: 4,158; Referee: Pavel Královec

2 August 2014 2	Zbrojovka Brno	3–0	Hradec Králové	Brno
17:00 CEST (UTC+2)	Schuster 63'; Jugas 77'; Marković 90'	Report	Černý (yellow card) 35'	Stadium: Městský fotbalový stadion Srbská; Attendance: 4,150; Referee: Karel Hrubeš

9 August 2014 3	Dukla Prague	1–1	Zbrojovka Brno	Prague
17:00 CEST (UTC+2)	Hanousek 7'; Štetina (yellow card) 27'; Gedeon (yellow card) 80'	Report	Marković 17'	Stadium: Stadion Juliska; Attendance: 1,579; Referee: Ondřej Lerch

16 August 2014 4	Zbrojovka Brno	2–2	Dynamo České Budějovice	Brno
17:00 CEST (UTC+2)	Klesa 5' (o.g.); Vávra 39'; Kaščák (yellow card) 63'; Hyčka (yellow card) 72'	Report	Koreš 13'; Volešák (yellow card) 58'; Vošahlík (yellow card) 66'; Hora 74'; Hála (yellow card) 75'	Stadium: Městský fotbalový stadion Srbská; Attendance: 3,418; Referee: Petr Ardeleánu

22 August 2014 5	Baník Ostrava	1–0	Zbrojovka Brno	Ostrava
18:00 CEST (UTC+2)	Jugas 20' (o.g.); Byrtus (yellow card) 85'; Mensah (yellow card) 90'	Report	Zavadil (yellow card) 36'; Jugas (red card) 61'	Stadium: Bazaly; Attendance: 4,091; Referee: Jan Jílek

29 August 2014 6	Zbrojovka Brno	1–1	Teplice	Brno
18:00 CEST (UTC+2)	Zavadil (yellow card) 34'; Pašek 68'; Kaščák (yellow card) 71'; Malík (yellow card) 85'	Report	Vůch 17'; Vondrášek (yellow card) 27'; Kapolongo (yellow card) 29'; Jablonský (yellow card) 47'; Krob (yellow card) 60'; Lüftner (yellow card) 75'	Stadium: Městský fotbalový stadion Srbská; Attendance: 3,505; Referee: Tomáš Kocourek

12 September 2014 7	Slavia Prague	1–3	Zbrojovka Brno	Prague
20:15 CEST (UTC+2)	Vukadinović (yellow card) 9'; Černý 17' (yellow card) 75'; Juhar (yellow card) 74'	Report	Zavadil (yellow card) 10' (goal) 77' (pen.); Vávra 42', 60'	Stadium: Eden Arena; Attendance: 5,823; Referee: Martin Nenadál

20 September 2014 8	Zbrojovka Brno	1–0	Slovan Liberec	Brno
17:00 CEST (UTC+2)	Sýkora 11'; Košťál (yellow card) 44'	Report	Pavelka (yellow card) 2'; Ďubek (yellow card) 13'; Karišik (yellow card) 86'	Stadium: Městský fotbalový stadion Srbská; Attendance: 3,284; Referee: Pavel Královec

27 September 2014 9	Zbrojovka Brno	2–3	Viktoria Plzeň	Brno
15:00 CEST (UTC+2)	Košťál (yellow card) 10'; Hladký (yellow card) 25'; Lutonský (yellow card) 25' (goal) 45'; Brigant 31'; Sýkora (yellow card) 43'; Schuster (yellow card) 44'; Moukanza (yellow card) 82' (yellow-red card) 89'	Report	Kolář 26' (pen.); Hejda (yellow card) 47'; Tecl 52' (yellow card) 88'; Řezník 62'; Horváth (yellow card) 88'	Stadium: Městský fotbalový stadion Srbská; Attendance: 6,492; Referee: Karel Hrubeš

4 October 2014 10	Mladá Boleslav	5–1	Zbrojovka Brno	Mladá Boleslav
17:00 CEST (UTC+2)	Šćuk 4'; Hůlka 7'; Ďuriš 46', 63' (yellow card) 69'; Košťál 78' (o.g.)	Report	Vávra 54'; Buchta (yellow card) 65'	Stadium: Městský stadion Attendance: 2,892; Referee: Michal Paták

18 October 2014 11	Zbrojovka Brno	1–3	Sparta Prague	Brno
20:15 CEST (UTC+2)	Schuster (yellow card) 26'; Malík (yellow card) 51'; Hladký (red card) 59'; Košťál 73'	Report	Krejčí 13'; Dočkal 61' (pen.); Lafata 70'	Stadium: Městský fotbalový stadion Srbská; Attendance: 8,262; Referee: Pavel Královec

24 October 2014 12	Vysočina Jihlava	2–0	Zbrojovka Brno	Jihlava
18:00 CEST (UTC+2)	Mešanović 37'; Hybš 74'; Vaculík (yellow card) 84'; Jánoš (yellow card) 90'	Report	Zavadil (yellow card) 35'	Stadium: Stadion v Jiráskově ulici Attendance: 3,303; Referee: Ondřej Lerch

1 November 2014 13	Zbrojovka Brno	0–1	Slovácko	Brno
17:00 CEST (UTC+2)		Report	Šumulikoski (yellow card) 30'; Kalouda (yellow card) 46'; Došek 74'	Stadium: Městský fotbalový stadion Srbská; Attendance: 3,322; Referee: Petr Ardeleánu

10 November 2014 14	Bohemians 1905	0–0	Zbrojovka Brno	Prague
19:00 CEST (UTC+2)	Nerad (yellow card) 72'	Report	Zavadil (yellow card) 34'	Stadium: Ďolíček; Attendance: 4,108; Referee: Zbyněk Proske

22 November 2014 15	Zbrojovka Brno	1–0	1. FK Příbram	Brno
17:00 CEST (UTC+2)	Moukanza 4'	Report	Zápotočný (red card) 32'	Stadium: Městský fotbalový stadion Srbská; Attendance: 2,923; Referee: Martin Nenadál

29 November 2014 16	Hradec Králové	2–1	Zbrojovka Brno	Hradec Králové
17:00 CEST (UTC+2)	Štípek 15'; Dvořák 59'	Report	Zavadil 33' (pen.); Malík (yellow card) 79'; Hladký (yellow card) 89'	Stadium: Všesportovní stadion Attendance: 1,917; Referee: Jiří Houdek

21 February 2015 17	Zbrojovka Brno	0–1	Dukla Prague	Brno
17:00 CEST (UTC+2)	Buchta (yellow card) 47'; Košťál (yellow card) 82'	Report	Považanec (yellow card) 31'; Berger 64' (pen.) (yellow card) 89'	Stadium: Městský fotbalový stadion Srbská; Attendance: 3,890; Referee: Karel Hrubeš

28 February 2015 18	Dynamo České Budějovice	1–3	Zbrojovka Brno	České Budějovice
17:00 CEST (UTC+2)	Kladrubský 87'	Report	Sýkora 11'; Jugas 51'; Vávra (yellow card) 71'; Malík 78'	Stadium: Stadion Střelecký ostrov Attendance: 2,666; Referee: Michal Paták

6 March 2015 19	Zbrojovka Brno	0–0	Baník Ostrava	Brno
18:00 CEST (UTC+2)	Zavadil (yellow card) 88'	Report	Sivrić (yellow card) 72'	Stadium: Městský fotbalový stadion Srbská; Attendance: 6,409; Referee: Pavel Královec

14 March 2015 20	Teplice	0–1	Zbrojovka Brno	Teplice
14:00 CEST (UTC+2)		Report	Keresteš (yellow card) 42'; Zoubele 61'; Jugas (yellow card) 88'; Marković (yellow card) 90+1'	Stadium: Na Stínadlech; Attendance: 4,091; Referee: Martin Nenadál

22 March 2015 21	Zbrojovka Brno	3–0	Slavia Prague	Brno
18:00 CEST (UTC+2)	Pašek 51'; Čtvrtníček 64'; Sýkora 89'; Hyčka (yellow card) 90'	Report	Bílek (yellow card) 24'; Kenia (yellow card) 77'	Stadium: Městský fotbalový stadion Srbská; Attendance: 5,318; Referee: Jiří Houdek

5 April 2015 22	Slovan Liberec	1–0	Zbrojovka Brno	Liberec
17:00 CEST (UTC+2)	Šural (yellow card) 51'; Karišik (yellow card) 61'; Bakoš 81'; Luckassen (yellow card) 84'; Breznaník (yellow card) 86'; Frýdek (yellow card) 90'	Report	Melichárek (yellow card) 35'; Čtvrtníček (red card) 61'; Keresteš (yellow card) 90'	Stadium: Stadion u Nisy; Attendance: 3,748; Referee: Petr Ardeleánu

12 April 2015 23	Viktoria Plzeň	4–1	Zbrojovka Brno	Plzeň
14:45 CEST (UTC+2)	Mahmutović 12', 24'; Kovařík 54'; Hořava 71'	Report	Buchta (yellow card) 19'; Marković 76'	Stadium: Stadion města Plzně; Attendance: 11,712; Referee: Pavel Franěk

19 April 2015 24	Zbrojovka Brno	1–0	Mladá Boleslav	Brno
16:00 CEST (UTC+2)	Marković 12' (pen.); Lutonský (yellow card) 75'	Report	Navrátil (yellow card) 11'; Šćuk (yellow card) 28'; Šisler (yellow card) 36'; Ďuriš (yellow card) 39'	Stadium: Městský fotbalový stadion Srbská; Attendance: 3,782; Referee: Ondřej Lerch

26 April 2015 25	Sparta Prague	4–0	Zbrojovka Brno	Prague
17:45 CEST (UTC+2)	Lafata 17', 37', 75'; Dočkal 54'	Report	Keresteš (yellow card) 69'; Schuster (yellow card) 82'	Stadium: Generali Arena; Attendance: 7,811; Referee: Martin Nenadál

1 May 2015 26	Zbrojovka Brno	3–2	Vysočina Jihlava	Brno
18:00 CEST (UTC+2)	Zavadil 42' (pen.); Pašek 51', 63'; Kopúnek (red card) 80'	Report	Marek (yellow card) 25'; Jungr 32', 72' (yellow card) 38'; Jánoš (yellow card) 62'; Kučera (yellow card) 74'	Stadium: Městský fotbalový stadion Srbská; Attendance: 3,010; Referee: Michal Paták

8 May 2015 27	Slovácko	1–1	Zbrojovka Brno	Uherské Hradiště
20:15 CEST (UTC+2)	Došek 55' (pen.); Kalouda (yellow card) 88'	Report	Buchta (yellow card) 69'; Zavadil 78'; Melichárek (yellow card) 90'	Stadium: Městský fotbalový stadion Miroslava Valenty; Attendance: 4,517; Referee: Petr Ardeleánu

15 May 2015 28	Zbrojovka Brno	0–1	Bohemians 1905	Brno
18:00 CEST (UTC+2)	Keresteš (yellow card) 50'; Jugas (yellow card) 61'	Report	Gajić (yellow card) 53'; Bratanović 80'	Stadium: Městský fotbalový stadion Srbská; Attendance: 3,523; Referee: Ondřej Pechanec

23 May 2015 29	1. FK Příbram	3–2	Zbrojovka Brno	Příbram
17:15 CEST (UTC+2)	Suchan 27'; Pilík (yellow card) 60'; Zeman 67' (pen.); Fořt 86'	Report	Bednář 44' (o.g.); Slančík (yellow card) 66'; Hyčka 76'	Stadium: Na Litavce; Attendance: 3,128; Referee: Karel Hrubeš

30 May 2015 30	Zbrojovka Brno	2–3	Jablonec	Brno
17:15 CEST (UTC+2)	Moukanza (yellow card) 70'; Sýkora 72'; Jugas 81'	Report	Novák 6'; Doležal 14', 43'; Čížek (yellow card) 73'	Stadium: Městský fotbalový stadion Srbská; Attendance: 3,256; Referee: Radek Příhoda

=== Czech Cup ===
==== Results ====
13 August 2014 Second round	Třebíč	0–4	Zbrojovka Brno	Třebíč, Czech Republic
17:00 CEST (UTC+2)	P. Svoboda (yellow card) 61'; Š. Svoboda (red card) 69'	Report	Pašek 3'; Mezlík 40', 71' (pen.); Marković 73'	Stadium: Janáčkovo stromořadí Attendance: 430; Referee: Jan Jílek

8 October 2014 Third round	Znojmo	1–0	Zbrojovka Brno	Znojmo, Czech Republic
16:00 CEST (UTC+2)	Okleštěk 3'; R. Buchta (yellow card) 34' (yellow-red card) 70'; Žondra (yellow card) 54'; Hříbek (yellow card) 82'	Report	Fischer (yellow card) 34'; Šumbera (yellow card) 57'; Hyčka (yellow card) 87'	Stadium: Městský stadion Attendance: 945; Referee: Pavel Julínek
