= 2014–15 SK Slavia Prague season =

Slavia Prague
2014–15 season
- President: Jaroslav Tvrdík
- Head coach: Miroslav Beránek
- Stadium: Eden Arena
- Czech First League: 11th
- Czech Cup: Third round
- Top goalscorer: League: Milan Škoda (19); All: Milan Škoda (19)
Home colours	Away colours

SK Slavia Prague played their 22nd season in the Czech First League in 2014–15. The team competed in Czech First League and the Czech Cup.

== Squad ==
Squad at end of season

Note: Flags indicate national team as defined under FIFA eligibility rules; some limited exceptions apply. Players may hold more than one non-FIFA nationality.

No.	Pos.	Nation	Player
1	GK	CZE	Karel Hrubeš
2	DF	CZE	Lukáš Fialka
3	DF	CZE	Jan Mikula
4	MF	CZE	Robert Hrubý
5	DF	CZE	Michal Švec
6	DF	HUN	Krisztián Tamás (on loan from Milan)
8	MF	CZE	Jaromír Zmrhal
10	MF	FRA	Damien Boudjemaa
11	MF	GEO	Levan Kenia
12	MF	CZE	Václav Prošek
14	DF	CZE	Marek Kodr
15	MF	SRB	Zoran Mihajlović
16	MF	CZE	Milan Černý

No.	Pos.	Nation	Player
17	FW	SEN	Dame Diop
18	MF	SRB	Vukadin Vukadinović
19	DF	CIV	Simon Deli
20	DF	CZE	Jiří Bílek
21	FW	CZE	Milan Škoda
23	MF	CZE	Karel Pitak
25	MF	CZE	Tomáš Mičola
26	MF	ARG	Aldo Baéz
27	FW	CZE	Marek Červenka
28	DF	CZE	Martin Latka
29	GK	CZE	Martin Berkovec
30	DF	CZE	Martin Dostál
34	GK	SVK	Matej Rakovan

=== Out on loan ===
Note: Flags indicate national team as defined under FIFA eligibility rules; some limited exceptions apply. Players may hold more than one non-FIFA nationality.

No. / Pos. / Nation / Player; 23 / FW / CZE / Josef Bazal (at Viktoria Žižkov)	No. / Pos. / Nation / Player; — / FW / CZE / Marek Červenka (at Sokolov)

== Competitions ==
=== Overall record ===
Competition	First match	Last match	Starting round	Final position	Record							
Competition	First match	Last match	Starting round	Final position	Pld	W	D	L	GF	GA	GD	Win %
Czech First League	26 July 2014	30 May 2015	Matchday 1	11th	30	9	7	14	40	45	−5	30.00
Czech Cup	13 August 2014	3 September 2014	Second round	Third round	2	1	0	1	4	3	+1	50.00
Total					32	10	7	15	44	48	−4	31.25

Source: Soccerway

=== Czech First League ===
==== League table ====
Pos	Team	Pld	W	D	L	GF	GA	GD	Pts	Qualification or relegation
9	Slovácko	30	10	7	13	43	46	−3	37	
10	Vysočina Jihlava	30	10	6	14	33	38	−5	36	
11	Slavia Prague	30	9	7	14	40	45	−5	34	
12	Slovan Liberec	30	7	12	11	39	43	−4	33 (Note: Slovan Liberec ahead of Baník Ostrava and Zbrojovka Brno on head-to-head record; Slovan Liberec 7 pts, Baník Ostrava 5 pts, Zbrojovka Brno 4 pts.)	Qualification for the Europa League third qualifying round (Note: Slovan Liberec won the 2014–15 Czech Cup and qualified for the third qualifying round of the UEFA Europa League.)
13	Baník Ostrava	30	8	9	13	23	41	−18	33	

Source: Fortuna liga
Rules for classification: 1) Points; 2) Head-to-head points; 3) Head-to-head goal difference; 4) Head-to-head goals scored; 5) Goal difference; 6) Goals scored; 7) Play-off (only if deciding champion, UEFA competitions, or relegation); 8) Draw.

==== Results summary ====
Overall								Home						Away					
Pld	W	D	L	GF	GA	GD	Pts	W	D	L	GF	GA	GD	W	D	L	GF	GA	GD
30	9	7	14	40	45	−5	34	6	4	5	26	23	+3	3	3	9	14	22	−8

Source: See results

==== Results by round ====
Round	1	2	3	4	5	6	7	8	9	10	11	12	13	14	15	16	17	18	19	20	21	22	23	24	25	26	27	28	29	30
Ground	A	H	H	A	H	A	H	A	H	A	H	A	H	A	H	A	A	H	A	H	A	H	A	H	A	H	A	H	A	H
Result	W	W	W	L	W	L	L	L	L	L	D	D	W	D	D	D	W	D	L	L	L	D	L	L	L	W	L	W	W	L
Position	2	2	1	2	1	2	4	8	10	10	9	11	9	9	9	8	6	8	7	10	12	11	12	13	14	13	13	13	10	11

Source: See results
A = Away; H = Home; W = Win; D = Draw; L = Loss

==== Matches ====
26 July 2014 1	Slovácko	1–2	Slavia Prague	Uherské Hradiště
20:15 CEST (UTC+02:00)	Trávník 33'	Report	Škoda 73'; Balaj 77'	Stadium: Městský fotbalový stadion Miroslava Valenty; Attendance: 5,320; Referee: Libor Kovařík

1 August 2014 2	Slavia Prague	3–1	Baník Ostrava	Prague
20:15 CEST (UTC+02:00)	Škoda 3'; Zmrhal 76'; Latka 85'	Report	Baránek 81'	Stadium: Eden Aréna; Attendance: 7,612; Referee: Emanuel Marek

10 August 2014 3	Slavia Prague	4–1	Slovan Liberec	Prague
20:15 CEST (UTC+02:00)	Balaj 18'; Zmrhal 74'; Škoda 86', 89'	Report	Šural 43'	Stadium: Eden Aréna; Attendance: 8,248; Referee: Michal Paták

16 August 2014 4	Teplice	2–1	Slavia Prague	Teplice
20:15 CEST (UTC+02:00)	Litsingi 12'; Nivaldo 18'	Report	Škoda 90+3'	Stadium: Na Stínadlech; Attendance: 8,680; Referee: Radek Příhoda

23 August 2014 5	Slavia Prague	1–0	Viktoria Plzeň	Prague
20:15 CEST (UTC+02:00)	Zmrhal 66'	Report		Stadium: Eden Aréna; Attendance: 11,003; Referee: Miroslav Zelinka

30 August 2014 6	Mladá Boleslav	2–1	Slavia Prague	Mladá Boleslav
20:15 CEST (UTC+02:00)	Šćuk 39'; Navrátil 45'	Report	Škoda 7'	Stadium: Městský stadion Attendance: 4,823; Referee: Pavel Franěk

12 September 2014 7	Slavia Prague	1–3	Zbrojovka Brno	Prague
20:15 CEST (UTC+02:00)	Černý 17'	Report	Vávra 42', 60'; Zavadil 77' (pen.)	Stadium: Eden Aréna; Attendance: 5,823; Referee: Martin Nenadál

20 September 2014 8	Bohemians 1905	2–0	Slavia Prague	Prague
20:15 CEST (UTC+02:00)	Jindřišek 60' (pen.); Lietava 77'	Report	Nitrianský (yellow card) 67' (yellow-red card) 81'	Stadium: Ďolíček; Attendance: 5,000; Referee: Pavel Orel

27 September 2014 9	Slavia Prague	0–2	Sparta Prague	Prague
18:00 CEST (UTC+02:00)		Report	Lafata 53', 80'	Stadium: Eden Aréna; Attendance: 16,661; Referee: Michal Paták

4 October 2014 10	Vysočina Jihlava	1–0	Slavia Prague	Jihlava
17:00 CEST (UTC+02:00)	Kukoľ 25'	Report		Stadium: Stadion v Jiráskově ulici Attendance: 3,593; Referee: Emanuel Marek

18 October 2014 11	Slavia Prague	1–1	Jablonec	Prague
17:00 CEST (UTC+02:00)	Bílek 45'	Report	Novák 30'	Stadium: Eden Aréna; Attendance: 3,943; Referee: Miroslav Zelinka

24 October 2014 12	Dynamo České Budějovice	1–1	Slavia Prague	České Budějovice
18:00 CEST (UTC+02:00)	Vošahlík 87'	Report	Piták 75' (pen.)	Stadium: Stadion Střelecký ostrov Attendance: 4,517; Referee: Pavel Královec

1 November 2014 13	Slavia Prague	3–2	1. FK Příbram	Prague
17:00 CET (UTC+01:00)	Latka 37' (pen.); Bílek 47'; Balaj 87'	Report	Zápotočný 45'; Řezníček 68'	Stadium: Eden Aréna; Attendance: 4,123; Referee: Ondřej Pechanec

7 November 2014 14	Dukla Prague	2–2	Slavia Prague	Prague
17:00 CET (UTC+01:00)	Hanousek 25'; Považanec 35'	Report	Dobrotka 16'; Škoda 29'	Stadium: Stadion Juliska; Attendance: 6,080; Referee: Tomáš Kocourek

23 November 2014 15	Slavia Prague	1–1	Hradec Králové	Prague
18:00 CET (UTC+01:00)	Škoda 57'	Report	Plašil 55'; Malinský (yellow card) 56' (yellow-red card) 78'	Stadium: Eden Aréna; Attendance: 5,228; Referee: Radek Příhoda

28 November 2014 16	Baník Ostrava	0–0	Slavia Prague	Ostrava
20:15 CET (UTC+01:00)		Report		Stadium: Bazaly; Attendance: 4,269; Referee: Michal Paták

21 February 2015 17	Slovan Liberec	1–3	Slavia Prague	Liberec
17:00 CET (UTC+01:00)	Obročník 25'	Report	Škoda 4', 36', 37'	Stadium: Stadion u Nisy; Attendance: 6,103; Referee: Michal Paták

28 February 2015 18	Slavia Prague	2–2	Teplice	Prague
20:15 CET (UTC+01:00)	Škoda 19'; Grigar 54' (o.g.)	Report	Potočný 11', 23'	Stadium: Eden Aréna; Attendance: 6,221; Referee: Miroslav Zelinka

13 March 2015 20	Slavia Prague	3–4	Mladá Boleslav	Prague
20:15 CET (UTC+01:00)	Zmrhal 23'; Kenia 37'; Škoda 47'	Report	Šćuk 38'; Šisler 43'; Skalák 62'; Wágner 90+1'	Stadium: Eden Aréna; Attendance: 5,182; Referee: Pavel Královec

18 March 2015 19	Viktoria Plzeň	1–0	Slavia Prague	Plzeň
18:00 CET (UTC+01:00)	Holenda 73'	Report		Stadium: Doosan Arena; Attendance: 11,675; Referee: Tomáš Kocourek

22 March 2015 21	Zbrojovka Brno	3–0	Slavia Prague	Brno
18:00 CET (UTC+01:00)	Pašek 51'; Čtvrtníček 64'; Sýkora 89'	Report		Stadium: Městský fotbalový stadion Srbská; Attendance: 5,315; Referee: Jiří Houdek

4 April 2015 22	Slavia Prague	1–1	Bohemians 1905	Prague
20:15 CEST (UTC+02:00)	Vukadinović 55' (red card) 58'	Report	Mikuš 88'	Stadium: Eden Aréna; Attendance: 8,019; Referee: Radek Příhoda

11 April 2015 23	Sparta Prague	2–1	Slavia Prague	Prague
19:05 CEST (UTC+02:00)	Lafata 66'; Brabec 89'	Report	Škoda 4'	Stadium: Generali Arena; Attendance: 18,665; Referee: Pavel Královec

18 April 2015 24	Slavia Prague	1–2	Vysočina Jihlava	Prague
17:00 CEST (UTC+02:00)	Diop 82'	Report	Šulek 50'; Kučera 65'	Stadium: Eden Aréna; Attendance: 4,351; Referee: Pavel Franěk

25 April 2015 25	Jablonec	2–1	Slavia Prague	Jablonec nad Nisou
17:00 CEST (UTC+02:00)	Novák 4'; Pospíšil 62'	Report	Škoda 11'	Stadium: Stadion Střelnice; Attendance: 4,230; Referee: Michal Paták

3 May 2015 26	Slavia Prague	2–0	Dynamo České Budějovice	Prague
17:00 CEST (UTC+02:00)	Škoda 1', 90'	Report		Stadium: Eden Aréna; Attendance: 4,493; Referee: Petr Ardeleánu

9 May 2015 27	1. FK Příbram	2–1	Slavia Prague	Příbram
16:00 CEST (UTC+02:00)	Bednář 25', 90'	Report	Škoda 16'	Stadium: Na Litavce; Attendance: 4,826; Referee: Tomáš Kocourek

17 May 2015 28	Slavia Prague	2–0	Dukla Prague	Prague
18:00 CEST (UTC+02:00)	Kenia 36'; Červenka 90'	Report		Stadium: Eden Aréna; Attendance: 3,331; Referee: Radek Příhoda

23 May 2015 29	Hradec Králové	0–1	Slavia Prague	Hradec Králové
17:15 CEST (UTC+02:00)		Report	52' Škoda	Stadium: Všesportovní stadion Attendance: 2,014; Referee: Jiří Houdek

30 May 2015 30	Slavia Prague	1–3	Slovácko	Prague
17:00 CEST (UTC+02:00)	Bílek 88'	Report	Došek 17'; Trávník 55'; Valenta 69'	Stadium: Eden Aréna; Attendance: 3,987; Referee: Martin Nenadál

=== Czech Cup ===
13 August 2014 Second round	Chrudim	1–3	Slavia Prague	Chrudim
17:00 CEST (UTC+02:00)	Vácha 43'	Report	Prošek 21'; Dobrotka 54'; Piták 64'	Stadium: Letní stadion v Průhonech; Attendance: 2,800; Referee: Jaroslav Bílek

3 September 2014 Third round	Viktoria Žižkov	2–1	Slavia Prague	Prague
17:00 CEST (UTC+02:00)	Bazal 33'; Voltr 90'	Report	Piták 16' (pen.)	Stadium: FK Viktoria Stadion; Attendance: 2,867; Referee: Jiří Jech
