= 2016–17 Czech Cup =

MOL Cup

Tournament details
- Country: Czech Republic
- Teams: 122

Final positions
- Champions: Zlín
- Runners-up: Opava

Tournament statistics
- Top goal scorer(s): Václav Jurečka; Haris Harba; Lukáš Magera; Lukáš Kopecký (5 goals)

The 2016–17 Czech Cup, known as the MOL Cup for sponsorship reasons, was the 24th season of the annual knockout football tournament of the Czech Republic. It began with the preliminary round on 22 July 2016 and ended with the final in May 2017. The winner of the cup gained the right to play in the group stage of the 2017–18 UEFA Europa League.

Zlín won the competition after beating Opava in the final.

== Preliminary round ==
The preliminary round ties are scheduled for 22 – 24 July 2016. 70 teams compete in this round, all from level 4 or below of the Czech league system.

22 July 2016	Frýdlant nad O. (4)	0–0 (a.e.t.) (3–4 p)	Havířov (4)	Frýdlant nad Ostravicí
				Stadium: Stadion 1. BFK Frýdlant
	Penalties
	Hrdlička (penalty scored); Šigut (penalty scored); Svatonský (penalty missed); Dvořák (penalty scored); Polach (penalty missed)		Lisický (penalty scored); K. Skoupý (penalty scored); L. Skoupý (penalty scored); Uher (penalty scored)

23 July 2016	TJ Přeštice (5)	1–3 (a.e.t.)	Přední Kopanina (4)	Přeštice
	Turek 90'		Čihák 68' (pen.); Flaks 97'; Fárka 118'

23 July 2016	FK Kratonohy (4)	2–0	Jiskra Ústí nad Orlicí (4)
	Jost 10'; Fidra 78'

23 July 2016	SK Aritma Prague (4)	2–3 (a.e.t.)	FK Kolín (4)
	Turbák 61'; Bogár 90' (pen.)		Novák 8'; Šourek 44'; Ludvíček 104'

23 July 2016	SK Rakovník (5)	1–1 (a.e.t.) (4–3 p)	1. FC Karlovy Vary (4)
	Mates 79'		Geňo 20'

23 July 2016	SK Vysoké Mýto (4)	0–1 (a.e.t.)	FK Čáslav (4)
			Maxa 108'

23 July 2016	Jakubčovice Fotbal (6)	1–3	SK Hranice (4)	Jakubčovice nad Odrou
	Ďurica 57'		Ferenc 23', 28' (pen.), 87'	Stadium: Stadion Jakubčovice

23 July 2016	FC TVD Slavičín (4)	3–0	TJ Valašské Meziříčí (4)
	T. Švach 12'; P. Švach 45+1' (?)

23 July 2016	TJ Lokomotiva Petrovice (4)	1–2	FC Odra Petřkovice (3)
	Hanusek 76'		Ptáček 47'; Václavik 56'

23 July 2016	FK Náchod (4)	3–1 (a.e.t.)	MFK Trutnov (4)

24 July 2016	SK Uhelné sklady Praha (5)	1–5	FC Olympia Hradec Králové (3)
	Šafránek 67'	Report	Očovan 8' (pen.), 38'; Kuťák 36'; Korba 67'; Ličman 74'	Attendance: 150; Referee: Duchoň

24 July 2016	TJ Sokol Sezimovo Ústí (6)	2–0	Sokol Hostouň (4)
	Hoffmann 4'; Kutner 72'

24 July 2016	TJ Proboštov (5)	4–4 (a.e.t.) (5–3 p)	FK Neratovice–Byškovice (4)

24 July 2016	Arsenal Česká Lípa (5)	2–2 (a.e.t.) (1–4 p)	FC Slovan Velvary (4)

24 July 2016	RMSK Cidlina Nový Bydžov (5)	1–3	TJ Spartak Chrastava (4)

24 July 2016	TJ Svitavy (5)	0–3	FK OEZ Letohrad (4)

24 July 2016	SK Štětí (4)	2–2 (a.e.t.) (4–2 p)	FK Turnov (4)

24 July 2016	SK Motorlet Prague (4)	8–2	FC Nový Bor (4)

24 July 2016	FK Baník Souš (4)	4–2	FK Ostrov (4)

24 July 2016	TJ Sušice (4)	0–5	SK Klatovy (4)

24 July 2016	FC Viktoria Mariánské Lázně (4)	4–1	FC Rokycany (4)

24 July 2016	SS Ostrá (4)	0–7	FK Admira Prague (4)

24 July 2016	TJ Tatran Sedlčany (4)	3–4	SK Kladno (4)

24 July 2016	SK Sokol Brozany (4)	3–1	FC Chomutov (4)

24 July 2016	AFK Tišnov (5)	2–2 (a.e.t.) (9–8 p)	FK Blansko (3)

24 July 2016	FC Restra Kralice na Hané (5)	0–2	Královské Nové Sady (4)

24 July 2016	FC RAK Provodov (5)	0–1	SFK ELKO Holešov (4)

24 July 2016	SC Pustá Polom (4)	0–2	FC Dolní Benešov (4)

24 July 2016	FK Jeseník (4)	0–2	FK Šumperk (4)

24 July 2016	TJ Slovan Bzenec (4)	0–1	MSK Břeclav (4)

24 July 2016	FC Spartak Velká Bíteš (4)	1–2	TJ Sokol Tasovice (4)

24 July 2016	FC Elseremo Brumov (4)	2–1	FC Velké Karlovice + Karolinka (4)

24 July 2016	1. FC Viktorie Přerov (4)	3–2	1. HFK Olomouc (3)

24 July 2016	FSC Stará Říše (4)	2–1	SFK Vrchovina Nové Město na Moravě (4)

24 July 2016	FC Chotěboř (5)	3–2 (a.e.t.)	FK Pelhřimov (4)

24 July 2016	OSS Lomnice (5)	w/o	FK Baník Most 1909 (4)

== First round ==
30 July 2016	MFK Havířov (4)	1–2	FK Fotbal Třinec (3)

30 July 2016	FK Kratonohy (4)	1–5	MFK Chrudim (3)

30 July 2016	FC Viktoria Mariánské Lázně (4)	1–6	FK Baník Sokolov (2)

30 July 2016	FC TVD Slavičín (4)	1–0	SK Hanácká Slavia Kroměříž (3)
17:00

30 July 2016	FC Slovan Rosice (4)	0–1	1. SC Znojmo (2)
17:00

30 July 2016	FC Elseremo Brumov (4)	0–5	MFK Vítkovice (2)
17:00

30 July 2016	FSC Stará Říše (4)	1–2	FC Velké Meziříčí (3)
17:00

30 July 2016	FK Šumperk (4)	1–0	FK Mohelnice (3)
17:00

30 July 2016	FC Dolní Benešov (4)	0–3	FC Baník Ostrava (2)
17:00

30 July 2016	SFK ELKO Holešov (4)	0–6	SK Sigma Olomouc (2)
17:00

30 July 2016	1.FC Viktorie Přerov (4)	1–5	SK Uničov (3)
17:00

30 July 2016	FC Odra Petřkovice (3)	0–1	SFC Opava (2)
17:00		Report	Jursa 66'	Attendance: 532; Referee: Mrázek

30 July 2016	SK Hranice (4)	0–5	FK Nový Jičín (4)
17:00

30 July 2016	SK Líšeň (3)	1–0	FC Viktoria Otrokovice (3)
17:00

30 July 2016	MSK Břeclav (4)	4–3	MFK Vyškov (3)
17:00

30 July 2016	FK Čáslav (4)	0–3	Sokol Živanice (4)
18:00

31 July 2016	FK Meteor Praha VIII (4)	2–3	FK Litoměřicko (3)
17:00

31 July 2016	SK Rakovník (5)	0–2	FK TJ Štěchovice (3)
17:00

== Second round ==
All times listed below are at CEST

9 August 2016	Nový Jičín	1–2	Karviná	Nový Jičín
18:00		Report		Stadium: Stadion TJ Nový Jičín

10 August 2016	Šumperk	1–4	Opava	Šumperk
18:00	Rozsíval 26' (pen.)	Report	Radić 35'; Jurečka 62' (pen.), 90'; Kuzmanović 86'	Stadium: Městský stadion Attendance: 350; Referee: Nenadál

10 August 2016	Chrudim	1–0 (a.e.t.)	Vítkovice	Chrudim
18:00		Report		Stadium: Za Vodojemem

10 August 2016	Líšeň	1–3	Prostějov	Brno
18:00		Report		Stadium: Stadion SK Líšeň

10 August 2016	Slavoj TKZ Polná	1–10	Sigma Olomouc	Polná
18:00		Report		Stadium: Stadion Slavoj Polná

10 August 2016	Hlučín	2–1 (a.e.t.)	Frýdek-Místek	Hlučín
18:00		Report		Stadium: Městský stadion

10 August 2016	Spartak Hulín	2–1	Znojmo	Hulín
18:00		Report		Stadium: Sportovní areál města Hulín

10 August 2016	Uničov	1–3	Slovácko	Uničov
18:00		Report		Stadium: Stadion SK Uničov

10 August 2016	Slavičín	1–3	Zbrojovka Brno	Slavičín
18:00		Report		Stadium: Stadion FC TVD Slavičín

10 August 2016	Klatovy	1–9	Vysočina Jihlava	Klatovy
18:00		Report		Stadium: Stadion Na Rozvoji

10 August 2016	Jiskra Domažlice	1–4	FK Jablonec	Jablonec nad Nisou
18:00		Report		Stadium: Stadion Střelnice

10 August 2016	Štěchovice	2–3	Bohemians 1905	Štěchovice
18:00		Report		Stadium: Stadion Štěchovice

10 August 2016	Loko Vltavín	1–2	Táborsko	Prague
18:00		Report		Stadium: Stadion na Plynárně

10 August 2016	Písek	3–0	Varnsdorf	Písek
18:00		Report		Stadium: Městský sportovní areál

10 August 2016	Sokol Živanice	0–1	Pardubice	Živanice
18:00		Report		Stadium: Stadion SK Náchod v Bělovsi

10 August 2016	Admira Prague	1–4	Hradec Králové	Prague
18:00		Report		Stadium: Stadion Na Pecích

10 August 2016	Převýšov	0–3	Dukla Prague	Převýšov
18:00		Report		Stadium: Stadion Převýšov

10 August 2016	Tachov	1–1 (a.e.t.) (5–4 p)	Viktoria Žižkov	Tachov
18:00		Report		Stadium: Stadion města Tachova

10 August 2016	Benátky nad Jizerou	2–5 (a.e.t.)	Vlašim	Benátky nad Jizerou
18:00		Report		Stadium: Městský stadion

10 August 2016	Český Brod	3–4	Dynamo České Budějovice	Český Brod
18:00		Report		Stadium: Na Kutilce

10 August 2016	Králův Dvůr	1–0	Teplice	Králův Dvůr
18:00		Report		Stadium: Městský stadion

16 August 2016	Litoměřice	3–1	Příbram	Litoměřice
18:00		Report		Stadium: Stadion Litoměřice

17 August 2016	Velké Meziříčí	2–1	Třinec	Velké Meziříčí
18:00		Report		Stadium: Stadión U Tržiště

23 August 2016	MSK Břeclav	0–6	Baník Ostrava	Břeclav
17:30		Report		Stadium: Stadion Lesní ulici

23 August 2016	Třebíč	0–4	Fastav Zlín	Třebíč
18:00		Report		Stadium: Horácky stadion Za Nemocnicí

23 August 2016	Benešov	2–4	Ústí nad Labem	Benešov
18:00		Report		Stadium: Stadion u Konopiště

24 August 2016	Zápy	2–1	Baník Sokolov	Brandýs nad Labem
18:00		Report		Stadium: Stadion SK Zápy

== Third round ==
All times listed below are at CEST

14 September 2016	Zápy	1–2	Mladá Boleslav	Brandýs nad Labem
16:30	Matějka 3'	Report	Mebrahtu 20' (pen.); Magera 85'	Stadium: Stadion TJ Sokol Zápy; Attendance: 325; Referee: Jana Adamkova

20 September 2016	Spartak Hulín	0–2	Bohemians 1905	Hulín
16:00		Report	Mašek 8'; Kuchta 56'	Stadium: Sportovní areál města Hulín; Attendance: 1,143; Referee: Jan Mikyska

20 September 2016	Vlašim	0–1	Hradec Králové	Vlašim
16:00		Report	Mudra 2'	Stadium: Stadion Kollárova ulice Attendance: 335; Referee: Radim Dresler

20 September 2016	Pardubice	1–3	Vysočina Jihlava	Pardubice
16:30	Rosa 13' (o.g.)	Report	Dvořák 4'; Jeřábek 21' (o.g.); Vaculík 36' (pen.)	Stadium: Pod Vinicí; Attendance: 595; Referee: Pavel Rejžek

20 September 2016	Sigma Olomouc	1–2	Táborsko	Olomouc
17:00	Chorý 61'	Report	Froněk 10'; Fulnek 22'	Stadium: Andrův stadion Attendance: 621; Referee: Martin Nenadál

21 September 2016	Litoměřice	2–1	Baník Ostrava	Litoměřice
16:00	Kabele 54'; Šimkovský 72'	Report	Sus 71'	Stadium: Stadion Litoměřice; Attendance: 1,893; Referee: Jan Váňa

21 September 2016	Hlučín	0–7	Viktoria Plzeň	Hlučín
16:30		Report	Baránek 16'; Kaçe 44'; Řezník 56'; Poznar 58' (pen.); Krmenčík 67'; Ďuriš 79' (pen.); Hořava 89'	Stadium: Městský stadion Attendance: 1,412; Referee: Jan Machálek

21 September 2016	Velké Meziříčí	1–2	Dukla Prague	Velké Meziříčí
16:30	Demeter 65' (pen.)	Report	Milošević 62'; Hanousek 69' (pen.)	Stadium: Stadión U Tržiště; Attendance: 1,620; Referee: Emanuel Marek

21 September 2016	Ústí nad Labem	1–4	Zbrojovka Brno	Ústí nad Labem
17:00	Procházka 38'	Report	Řezníček 41', 80'; Pašek 49'; Hyčka 83'	Stadium: Městský stadion Attendance: 858; Referee: Ondřej Ginzel

27 September 2016	Karviná (1)	2–0 (a.e.t.)	Prostějov (2)	Karviná
14:30	Jurčo 97'; Šisler 103'	Report		Stadium: Městský stadion Attendance: 962; Referee: Peter Mrázek

28 September 2016	Chrudim (3)	1–3	Slavia Prague (1)	Chrudim
15:00	Kopecký 68' (pen.)	Report	Barák 45'; Mihalík 72' (pen.); van Buren 90'	Stadium: Za Vodojemem; Attendance: 3,450; Referee: Pavel Franěk

5 October 2016	Tachov (3)	0–4	Zlín (1)	Tachov
15:00		Report	Diop 18'; Štípek 38'; Harba 48'; Holík 71'	Stadium: Měststa Tachov; Attendance: 700; Referee: Karel Hrubeš

11 October 2016	Králův Dvůr (3)	1–1 (a.e.t.) (5–3 p)	Jablonec (1)	Králův Dvůr
16:00	Hell 44'	Report	Kubitsa 8'	Stadium: Městský stadion Attendance: 680; Referee: Milan Matejcek

11 October 2016	Slovácko (1)	3–4 (a.e.t.)	Opava (2)	Uherské Hradiště
17:00	Havlík 44'; Ťok 44'; Hlúpik 93'	Report	Žídek 58'; Jurečka 76'; Jursa 102'; Schaffartzik 105' (pen.)	Stadium: Městský fotbalový stadion Miroslava Valenty; Attendance: 630; Referee: Pavel Julínek

12 October 2016	Písek (3)	1–5	Slovan Liberec (1)	Písek
16:00	Milec 18'	Report	Marković 8', 55'; Wesley da Silva 15'; Karafiát 35'; Navrátil 45'	Stadium: Městský sportovní Attendance: 500; Referee: Jiří Houdek

12 October 2016	České Budějovice (2)	1–2	Sparta Prague (1)	České Budějovice
16:00	Táborský 82'	Report	Pulkrab 51'; Juliš 55'	Stadium: Stadion Střelecký ostrov Attendance: 4,550; Referee: Martin Nenadál

== Fourth round ==
All times listed below are at CEST

26 October 2016	Mladá Boleslav	4–2	Hradec Králové	Mladá Boleslav
15:30	Mebrahtu 20'; Magera 31', 66', 90+1' (pen.)	Report	Schwarz 24' (pen.), 54'	Stadium: Adidas Aréna; Attendance: 693; Referee: Jiří Houdek

26 October 2016	Zlín	3–1 (a.e.t.)	Sparta Prague	Zlín
16:30	Jordan 52'; Harba 105'; Vukadinović 112'	Report	Pulkrab 18'	Stadium: Letná Stadion; Attendance: 4,485; Referee: Ondřej Berka

26 October 2016	Opava	4–2	Viktoria Plzeň	Opava
16:30	Janetzký 42'; Jurečka 68'; Žídek 83'; Jursa 90+3'	Report	Suchan 13'; Hejda 89'	Stadium: Stadion v Městských sadech Attendance: 6,784; Referee: Pavel Franěk

26 October 2016	Zbrojovka Brno	2–1	Vysočina Jihlava	Brno
17:00	Řezníček 38'; Škoda 50' (pen.)	Report	Rosa 56'	Stadium: Městský fotbalový stadion Srbská; Attendance: 1,230; Referee: Josef Váňa

26 October 2016	Bohemians 1905	3–1	Králův Dvůr	Prague
18:00	Berger 11'; Holenda 18'; Mikuš 78'	Report	Balšánek 49'	Stadium: Ďolíček; Attendance: 1,905; Referee: Ondřej Ginzel

26 October 2016	Slavia Prague	7–0	Litoměřice	Prague
18:30	Mešanović 11', 12', 20'; Mingazow 41'; van Kessel 62'; Železník 70'; van Buren 89'	Report		Stadium: Eden Arena; Attendance: 3,237; Referee: Jana Adamkova

30 November 2016	Karviná	2–2 (a.e.t.) (4–2 p)	Dukla Prague	Karviná
16:00		Report		Stadium: Městský stadion

1 March 2017	Táborsko	1–3	Slovan Liberec	Sezimovo Ústí
13:00	Mrázek 45'	Report	Bosančić 18' (pen.); Mikula 35'; Toml 79' (o.g.)	Stadium: Stadion Soukeník

== Quarter-finals ==
26 March 2017	SFC Opava	2–1	FC Zbrojovka Brno	Opava
12:15	Janetzký 65'; Schaffartzik 76'	Report	Řezníček 45'	Stadium: Stadion v Městských sadech Referee: Ondřej Berka

4 April 2017	Bohemians 1905	1–1 (a.e.t.) (3–4 p)	FK Mladá Boleslav	Prague
20:15	Mašek 75'	Report	Magera 59'	Stadium: Ďolíček; Attendance: 999; Referee: Martin Nenadál
	Penalties
	Jindřišek (penalty scored); Hašek (penalty scored); Bartek (penalty missed); Havel (penalty scored); Mašek (penalty missed)		Přikryl (penalty scored); Matějovský (penalty scored); Čmovš (penalty scored); Železník (penalty scored)

5 April 2017	FC Slovan Liberec	2–4 (a.e.t.)	FC Fastav Zlín	Liberec
20:15	Gajić 11' (o.g.); Voltr 60'	Report	Vukadinović 52'; Matejov 57'; Holík 95'; Kopečný 119'	Stadium: Stadion u Nisy; Attendance: 1,527; Referee: Jiri Houdek

12 April 2017	SK Slavia Prague	5–2	MFK Karviná	Prague
18:45	Frydrych 25'; Scuk 38'; Mingazov 49'; Stanislav Tecl 63'; Boril 68'		Wagner 34' (pen.); Luftner (54.)	Stadium: Eden Arena

== Semi-finals ==
25 April 2017	SK Slavia Prague	0–1	FC Fastav Zlín	Prague
20:15			Holík 31'	Stadium: Eden Arena

26 April 2017	FK Mladá Boleslav	0–2	SFC Opava	Mladá Boleslav
20:15			Helebrand 22'; Jurečka 42'	Stadium: Městský stadion

== Final ==
17 May 2017	SFC Opava	0–1	FC Fastav Zlín	Olomouc
17:30			Bartolomeu 20'	Stadium: Andrův stadion Attendance: 11,219; Referee: Radek Příhoda

== See also ==
- 2016–17 Czech First League
- 2016–17 Czech National Football League
