= 2016–17 Czech National Football League =

Czech National Football League
- Season: 2016–17
- Champions: Sigma Olomouc
- Promoted: Sigma Olomouc; Baník Ostrava
- Relegated: Prostějov
- Matches played: 240
- Goals scored: 676 (2.82 per match)
- Top goalscorer: Jakub Plšek (18 goals)

The 2016–17 Czech National Football League was the 24th season of the Czech Republic's second tier football league.

== Team changes ==
After one season played with 15 teams, the number of teams in the Czech National Football League increased back to 16 for the 2016–17 season.

=== From FNL ===
- FC Hradec Králové (promoted to 2016–17 Czech First League)
- Karviná (promoted to 2016–17 Czech First League)
- Olomouc B (relegated to 2016–17 Moravian–Silesian Football League)
- FK Slavoj Vyšehrad (relegated to 2016–17 Bohemian Football League)

=== To FNL ===
- SK Sigma Olomouc (relegated from 2015–16 Czech First League)
- FC Baník Ostrava (relegated from 2015–16 Czech First League)
- FK Viktoria Žižkov (promoted from 2015–16 Bohemian Football League)
- 1. SK Prostějov (promoted from 2015–16 Moravian-Silesian Football League)
- MFK Vítkovice (promoted from 2015–16 Moravian-Silesian Football League)

== Team overview ==
Location of clubs in the 2016–17 2. Liga

Club	Location	Stadium	Capacity	2015-16 Position
Baník Ostrava	Ostrava	Městský stadion (Ostrava)	15,123	16th in 1. Liga
České Budějovice	České Budějovice	Stadion Střelecký ostrov	6,681	12th
Frýdek-Místek	Frýdek-Místek	Stovky	12,000	10th
Opava	Opava	Stadion v Městských sadech	7,758	11th
Pardubice	Pardubice	Pod Vinicí	2,500	6th
Prostějov	Prostějov	Stadion Za Místním nádražím	3,500	1st in MSFL
Sigma Olomouc	Olomouc	Andrův stadion	12,566	15th in 1. Liga
Sokolov	Sokolov	Stadion FK Baník Sokolov	5,000	4th
Táborsko	Sezimovo Ústí	Sportovní areál Soukeník	5,000	5th
Třinec	Třinec	Stadion Rudolfa Labaje	2,200	13th
Ústí nad Labem	Ústí nad Labem	Městský stadion (Ústí nad Labem)	3,000	7th
Varnsdorf	Varnsdorf	Městský stadion v Kotlině	5,000	9th
Viktoria Žižkov	Prague	FK Viktoria Stadion	5,600	3rd in ČFL
Vítkovice	Vítkovice	Městský stadion (Ostrava)	15,123	2nd in MSFL
Vlašim	Vlašim	Stadion Kollárova ulice	6,000	8th
Znojmo	Znojmo	Městský stadion (Znojmo)	5,000	3rd

== League table ==
Pos	Team	Pld	W	D	L	GF	GA	GD	Pts	Promotion or relegation
1	Sigma Olomouc (C, P)	30	21	6	3	59	22	+37	69	Promotion to 2017–18 I. liga
2	Baník Ostrava (P)	30	18	10	2	48	20	+28	64	Promotion to 2017–18 I. liga
3	Opava	30	19	6	5	61	33	+28	63	
4	Vlašim	30	16	6	8	61	34	+27	54	
5	Dynamo České Budějovice	30	12	10	8	39	31	+8	46	
6	Znojmo	30	11	8	11	49	47	+2	41	
7	Pardubice	30	10	9	11	31	33	−2	39	
8	Ústí nad Labem	30	10	7	13	34	41	−7	37	
9	Viktoria Žižkov (Note: Viktoria Žižkov were deducted 3 points after the season due to late payments of debts to the Czech FA.)	30	10	9	11	49	41	+8	36	
10	Táborsko	30	9	9	12	38	48	−10	36	
11	Varnsdorf	30	10	5	15	44	46	−2	35	
12	Fotbal Třinec	30	9	6	15	40	52	−12	33	
13	Baník Sokolov	30	7	11	12	28	44	−16	32	
14	Vítkovice	30	9	4	17	35	47	−12	31	
15	Frýdek-Místek (Note: Frýdek-Místek were spared from relegation after MSFL winners SK Uničov and next three best-placed teams refused promotion.)	30	7	8	15	40	57	−17	29	
16	Prostějov (R)	30	3	3	24	20	80	−60	12	Relegation to 2017–18 MSFL

Source: Fortuna národní liga
Rules for classification: 1) Points; 2) Goal difference; 3) Goals scored.
(C) Champions; (P) Promoted; (R) Relegated

== Top scorers ==
Rank	Player	Club	Goals
1	(Czech Republic) Jakub Plšek	Olomouc B	18
2	(Czech Republic) Tomáš Chorý	Olomouc B	16
3	(Czech Republic) Pavel Vyhnal	Vlašim	15
4	(Czech Republic) Jan Schaffartzik	Opava	14
5	(Bosnia and Herzegovina) Adnan Džafić	Táborsko	13
6	(Czech Republic) Michal Petráň	Pardubice	12
7	(Czech Republic) Alexander Jakubov	Ostrava	11
7	(Czech Republic) Vojtěch Engelmann	Žižkov	11
7	(Czech Republic) Ivo Táborský	České Budějovice	11
10	(Czech Republic) Tomáš Dočekal	Žižkov	10
10	(Czech Republic) Petr Glaser	Sokolov	10
10	(Czech Republic) Pavel Moulis	Ústí nad Labem	10

== See also ==
- 2016–17 Czech First League
- 2016–17 Czech Cup
