= Mohamed Traoré (footballer, born 1993) =

Guinean footballer

Personal information
- Full name: Mohamed Traoré
- Date of birth: 17 May 1993 (age 33)
- Place of birth: Conakry, Guinea
- Height: 1.85 m (6 ft 1 in)
- Position: Winger

Team information
- Current team: Tišnov
- Number: 10

Youth career
- Touba
- Aubervilliers

Senior career*
Years	Team	Apps	(Gls)
2010−2012	Aubervilliers	7	(0)
2012−	Zbrojovka Brno	17	(1)
2013	→ Líšeň (loan)	1	(0)
2014−2015	→ Tišnov (loan)	38	(50)
2016	→ Blansko (loan)	1	(2)
2016−	→ Tišnov (loan)	5	(8)
- * Club domestic league appearances and goals as of 7 September 2016

Mohamed Traoré (born 17 May 1993 in Conakry) is a Guinean footballer who currently plays as a winger for FK Blansko on loan from FC Zbrojovka Brno.

== Personal life ==
Traoré was born in Conakry, Guinea. His favorite player is a Brazilian retired footballer Ronaldo.

== Football career ==
=== Early career ===
He started playing football at Conakry by local club FC Touba.

=== Aubervilliers ===
At the age of 16 he moved to the France to his uncle, where he stayed. After five months he joined FCM Aubervilliers playing CFA. He did not receive many opportunities to play, but he scored in the final match of youth tournament at Stade de France.

=== Zbrojovka Brno ===
==== 2012–13 season ====
During the autumn of 2012 he was on trial at FC Zbrojovka Brno. In January 2013, he signed a three-year contract there. After scoring 2 goals in 8 games for the reserve team, he got a chance to play for Zbrojovka's first team on 11 November 2012 in their game against Sparta, where he came in the game as a substitute for Milan Lutonský in the 81st minute. On 1 February 2013, in the friendly match against Daegu FC, he scored his premiere goal for the first team. He was part of the Zbrojovka youth team that won the Czech U-21 Junior League in 2013.

==== 2013–14 season ====
Traoré scored his first Zbrojovka goal in the home game against Bohemians on 29 July 2013 on an assist by Pavel Zavadil in a 5–1 win.

On 26 August 2013 Traore collapsed after league match at Ostrava. He underwent surgery with clogged arteries in Ostrava. According to the doctors, extensive myocardial infarction could result in death. Traoré is from their perspective exceptional case, certainly the first in the country and possibly in the world. On 30 August 2013 Traoré left the hospital and continues home treatment. During the 2014–15 season he prepared individually and, in the meantime, underwent several medical examinations. Professional football was not recommended to him.

==== Loan to Tišnov ====
Since August 2014, he has been trying lower-level football to restart his career. In AFK Tišnov he plays 1.B třída, group A, which is the seventh tier of Czech football and the third tier of South Moravian Region. He scored twelve goals in the first half of the season, becoming the second best goalscorer in the competition. According to Zbrojovka, his condition has highly improved in the past period. From 12 January 2015, he started training with the Zbrojovka Brno U-21 team in full workload, but still does not play any matches. In January 2015, he got permission to play warm-up matches. He became the top goalscorer with 33 goals in 25 matches.

==== Loan to Blansko ====
During the winter break 2015−2016, Traoré joined Czech Fourth Division side FK Blansko on a half-season-long loan. He made his debut on 19 March in their 4–3 away win against Rosice, in which he scored 2 goals.

== Career statistics ==
=== Club ===
As of match played 7 September 2016.

Club performance			League		National cup		Total	
Season	Club	League	Apps	Goals	Apps	Goals	Apps	Goals
2011–12	Aubervilliers	CFA	2	0	0	0	2	0
2012–13	Aubervilliers	CFA	5	0	0	0	5	0
Aubervilliers total			7	0	0	0	7	0
2012–13	Brno	Gambrinus liga	11	0	0	0	11	0
2013–14	Brno	Gambrinus liga	6	1	0	0	6	1
Brno total			17	1	0	0	17	1
2014–15	Tišnov	1.B třída (7th tier)	25	33	0	0	25	33
2015–16	Tišnov	1.A třída (6th tier)	13	17	0	0	13	17
2015−16	Blansko	Divize "D" (4th tier)	1	2	0	0	1	2
2016−17	Tišnov	South Moravian Championship (5th tier)	5	8	0	0	5	8
Professional career total			24	1	0	0	24	1

== Honours ==
- Zbrojovka Brno
  - Czech U-21 Junior League: 2012-2013
