= Frelih =

Frelih is a surname. Notable people with the surname include:

- Boštjan Frelih (born 1993), Slovenian footballer
- Jasmin B. Frelih, Slovenian writer, editor and translator
- Polona Frelih, Slovenian table tennis player
- Žiga Frelih (born 1998), Slovenian footballer
