= Martin Sus =

Martin Sus may refer to:

- Martin Sus (footballer, born 1989), Czech footballer for FC Zbrojovka Brno
- Martin Sus (footballer, born 1990), Czech footballer for Baník Ostrava
