= Přerovský =

Přerovský (feminine: Přerovská) is a Czech surname, meaning 'from Přerov'. Notable people with the surname include:

- Daniel Přerovský (born 1992), Czech footballer
- Thomas Prerovsky (born 1969), Austrian tennis player
