= Dominik Duda =

Czech footballer

Personal information
- Full name: Dominik Duda
- Date of birth: 3 March 1995 (age 31)
- Place of birth: Znojmo, Czech Republic
- Height: 1.75 m (5 ft 9 in)
- Position: Midfielder

Team information
- Current team: Senica
- Number: 10

Youth career
- –2015: Zbrojovka Brno

Senior career*
Years	Team	Apps	(Gls)
2015–2016	Opava B		
2016–2017	Blansko	29	(0)
2017	Tišnov		
2018	Slovan Bratislava		
2018–2019	Příbram	0	(0)
2019–2020	SC Stronsdorf		
2020–	Senica	55	(0)
- * Club domestic league appearances and goals as of 19:06, 31 May 2022 (UTC)

Dominik Duda (born 3 March 1995) is a Czech footballer who plays for Senica in the Fortuna Liga as a midfielder.

== Club career ==
=== FK Senica ===
Duda made his Fortuna Liga debut for Senica against iClinic Sereď on 13 June 2020. Duda was featured in the starting-XI but was replaced in the second half by Filip Černák.
