= David Štrombach =

Czech footballer

Personal information
- Date of birth: 9 January 1996 (age 30)
- Place of birth: Znojmo, Czech Republic
- Height: 1.79 m (5 ft 10 in)
- Position: Striker

Team information
- Current team: Viktoria Žižkov
- Number: 7

Youth career
- 2002–2003: TJ Tatran Šatov
- 2003–2010: Znojmo
- 2010–2014: Zbrojovka Brno

Senior career*
Years	Team	Apps	(Gls)
2014–2016	Zbrojovka Brno B	46	(21)
2016	→ Skalica (loan)	3	(0)
2016	→ Prostějov (loan)	14	(4)
2017–2019	Znojmo	31	(6)
2019–2020	Blansko	16	(1)
2020–2022	Znojmo	25	(13)
2022–	Viktoria Žižkov	8	(1)

International career
2014	Czech Republic U-18	2	(0)
- * Club domestic league appearances and goals as of 22:19, 11 June 2019 (UTC)

David Štrombach (born 9 January 1996) is a Czech football player who currently plays for Viktoria Žižkov.

== Career ==
Štrombach joined FK Blansko in 2019.
