= Borys Tashchy =

Ukrainian footballer (born 1993)

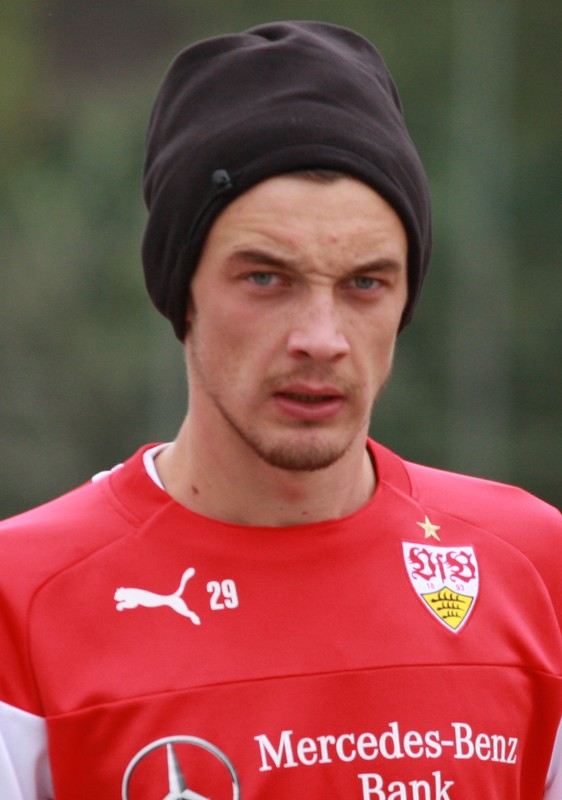
- Tashchy with VfB Stuttgart II

Personal information
- Full name: Borys Borysovych Tashchy
- Date of birth: 26 July 1993 (age 33)
- Place of birth: Odesa, Ukraine
- Height: 1.92 m (6 ft 4 in)
- Positions: Forward; attacking midfielder

Youth career
- 2005–2009: Chornomorets Odesa

Senior career*
Years	Team	Apps	(Gls)
2009–2011	Chornomorets Odesa	26	(5)
2010	→ Chornomorets-2 Odesa	4	(0)
2011–2014	Dynamo Moscow	0	(0)
2012–2013	→ Chornomorets Odesa (loan)	1	(0)
2013–2014	→ Hoverla Uzhhorod (loan)	0	(0)
2014–2016	VfB Stuttgart II	45	(9)
2014–2017	VfB Stuttgart	14	(0)
2017	→ Zbrojovka Brno (loan)	12	(2)
2017–2019	MSV Duisburg	51	(12)
2019–2021	FC St. Pauli	28	(0)
2019	FC St. Pauli II	2	(1)
2021	Pohang Steelers	20	(1)
2022–2026	Erzgebirge Aue	117	(12)

International career
2008–2009	Ukraine U16	11	(1)
2010	Ukraine U17	5	(2)
2011	Ukraine U18	4	(1)
2010–2011	Ukraine U19	8	(0)
2012	Ukraine U20	4	(2)
2012–2013	Ukraine U21	9	(0)
- * Club domestic league appearances and goals as of 16:10, 20 March 2026 (UTC)

Borys Borysovych Tashchy (Ukrainian: Бори́с Бори́сович Тащи́; born 26 July 1993) is a Ukrainian professional footballer who plays as a forward or attacking midfielder.

== Club career ==
Tashchy was born in Odesa. He was sold by his original club Chornomorets Odesa to the Latvian side JFK Olimps on 22 August 2011, and the very next day Olimps re-sold him to Dynamo Moscow. Dynamo's general director Roman Dyakov could not explain why they did not directly buy him from Chornomorets, citing confidentiality, and Serhiy Kernitsky, Chornomorets' vice-president was perplexed at this scheme as the transfer price given by Chornomorets would be the same for Dynamo as it was for Olimps.

=== VfB Stuttgart ===
On 9 October 2014, Tashchy moved to VfB Stuttgart II. He made his debut for VfB Stuttgart in the Bundesliga on 29 November 2015 against Borussia Dortmund. Stuttgart relegated from Bundesliga at the end of 2015–16 season, but Tashchy remain with the team for the next season. He scored his first official goal for the team on 22 August 2016 in a match against FC 08 Homburg for the DFB-Pokal.

==== Loan to FC Zbrojovka Brno ====
On 22 February 2017, Tashchy moved to FC Zbrojovka Brno on a half-year loan. In July 2017 he became a free agent after his contract with Stuttgart was terminated.

=== MSV Duisburg ===
On 4 July 2017, Tashchy moved to MSV Duisburg.

=== FC St. Pauli ===
For the 2019–20 season, he was signed by FC St. Pauli. He agreed the termination of his contract with the club in January 2021.

=== Pohang Steelers ===
On 5 March. 2021 Tashchy moved to Pohang Steelers of K League 1. At the end of the season, he left the club through mutual consent.

== International career ==
Tashchy represented Ukraine in all national selections from U16 to U21.

Due to his Bessarabian Bulgarian roots, in 2014 he received a Bulgarian passport making him eligible for the Bulgaria national football team. On 28 March 2016, Bulgarian media reported that Borys had already spoken with BFU officials and had expressed his desire to represent Bulgaria. Petev once again confirmed that Tashchy will play for Bulgaria on 27 May 2016, but he couldn't join the team for the Kirin Cup due to paper problems. The process of finalizing his paperwork to play for Bulgaria was put to a halt after Petar Houbchev succeeded Petev as manager of the national side.

== Career statistics ==
As of match played on 25 November 2023

Club statistics
Club	Season	League			National Cup		Continental		Other		Total	
Club	Season	Division	Apps	Goals	Apps	Goals	Apps	Goals	Apps	Goals	Apps	Goals
Chornomorets Odesa	2010–11	Ukrainian First League	23	5	1	0	—		—		24	5
Chornomorets Odesa	2011–12	Ukrainian Premier League	3	0	0	0	—		—		3	0
Chornomorets Odesa	2012–13	Ukrainian Premier League	1	0	0	0	—		—		1	0
Chornomorets Odesa	Totals		27	5	1	0	0	0	0	0	28	5
VfB Stuttgart II	2014–15	3. Liga	23	3	—		—		—		23	3
VfB Stuttgart II	2015–16	3. Liga	19	6	—		—		—		19	6
VfB Stuttgart II	2016–17	Regionalliga Südwest	3	0	—		—		—		3	0
VfB Stuttgart II	Totals		45	9	0	0	0	0	0	0	45	9
VfB Stuttgart	2015–16	Bundesliga	9	0	1	0	—		—		10	0
VfB Stuttgart	2016–17	2. Bundesliga	5	0	2	1	—		—		7	1
VfB Stuttgart	Totals		14	0	3	1	0	0	0	0	17	1
Zbrojovka Brno (loan)	2016–17	Czech First League	12	2	1	0	—		—		13	2
MSV Duisburg	2017–18	2. Bundesliga	32	11	1	0	—		—		33	11
MSV Duisburg	2018–19	2. Bundesliga	19	1	2	1	—		—		21	2
MSV Duisburg	Totals		51	12	3	1	0	0	0	0	54	13
FC St. Pauli II	2019–20	Regionalliga Nord	2	1	—		—		—		2	1
FC St. Pauli	2019–20	2. Bundesliga	19	0	1	0	—		—		20	0
FC St. Pauli	2020–21	2. Bundesliga	9	0	1	0	—		—		10	0
FC St. Pauli	Totals		28	0	2	0	0	0	0	0	30	0
Pohang Steelers	2021	K League 1	20	1	2	0	6 (Note: Appearances in the AFC Champions League)	3	—		28	4
Erzgebirge Aue	2022–23	3. Liga	32	6	1	0	—		2 (Note: Appearances in the Saxony Cup)	0	35	6
Erzgebirge Aue	2023–24	3. Liga	16	1	0	0	—		1	0	17	1
Erzgebirge Aue	Total		48	7	1	0	0	0	3	0	52	7
Career totals			247	37	13	2	6	3	3	0	269	42
