= Matěj Helebrand =

Czech footballer (born 1997)

Personal information
- Date of birth: 19 June 1997 (age 29)
- Place of birth: Opava, Czech Republic
- Height: 1.87 m (6 ft 2 in)
- Position: Defender

Team information
- Current team: Zlaté Moravce
- Number: 4

Youth career
- Opava

Senior career*
Years	Team	Apps	(Gls)
2016–2024	Opava	101	(3)
2020	→ Vítkovice (loan)	10	(0)
2020–2021	→ Blansko (loan)	20	(1)
2024-2026	Zlaté Moravce	52	(3)

International career^{‡}
2015–	Czech Republic U18	2	(0)
2015–	Czech Republic U19	14	(0)
2016–	Czech Republic U20	1	(0)
- * Club domestic league appearances and goals as of 25 May 2026 ‡ National team caps and goals as of 26 April 2017

Matěj Helebrand (born 19 June 1997) is a Czech professional footballer who plays as a defender for a Slovak team FC ViOn Zlaté Moravce-Vrable

He made his senior league debut for Opava on 21 August 2016 in a Czech National Football League 3–3 draw at Viktoria Žižkov. On 26 April 2017, he scored the winning goal in Opava's 2–0 win at Mladá Boleslav in the Czech FA Cup semi-finals, helping his Second League team to defeat their fourth First League opponents in a row and advance to the FA Cup final for the first time in club history.

On 1 July 2024, Matej moved to Zlate Moravce on a free transfer.
