= David Jukl =

Czech footballer

Personal information
- Date of birth: 2 January 1991 (age 35)
- Place of birth: Nové Město na Moravě, Czechoslovakia
- Height: 1.82 m (6 ft 0 in)
- Position: Midfielder

Team information
- Current team: FC Zbrojovka Brno

Youth career
- –2010: FC Zbrojovka Brno

Senior career*
Years	Team	Apps	(Gls)
2010–2012	FC Zbrojovka Brno B	39	(2)
2011	→ FK Čáslav (loan)	10	(0)
2012–	FC Zbrojovka Brno	1	(0)
2013	→ SFC Opava (loan)	3	(0)
- * Club domestic league appearances and goals as of 3 July 2013

David Jukl (born 2 January 1991) is a professional Czech football player currently playing for FC Zbrojovka Brno.
