= Marko Radić =

Serbian footballer

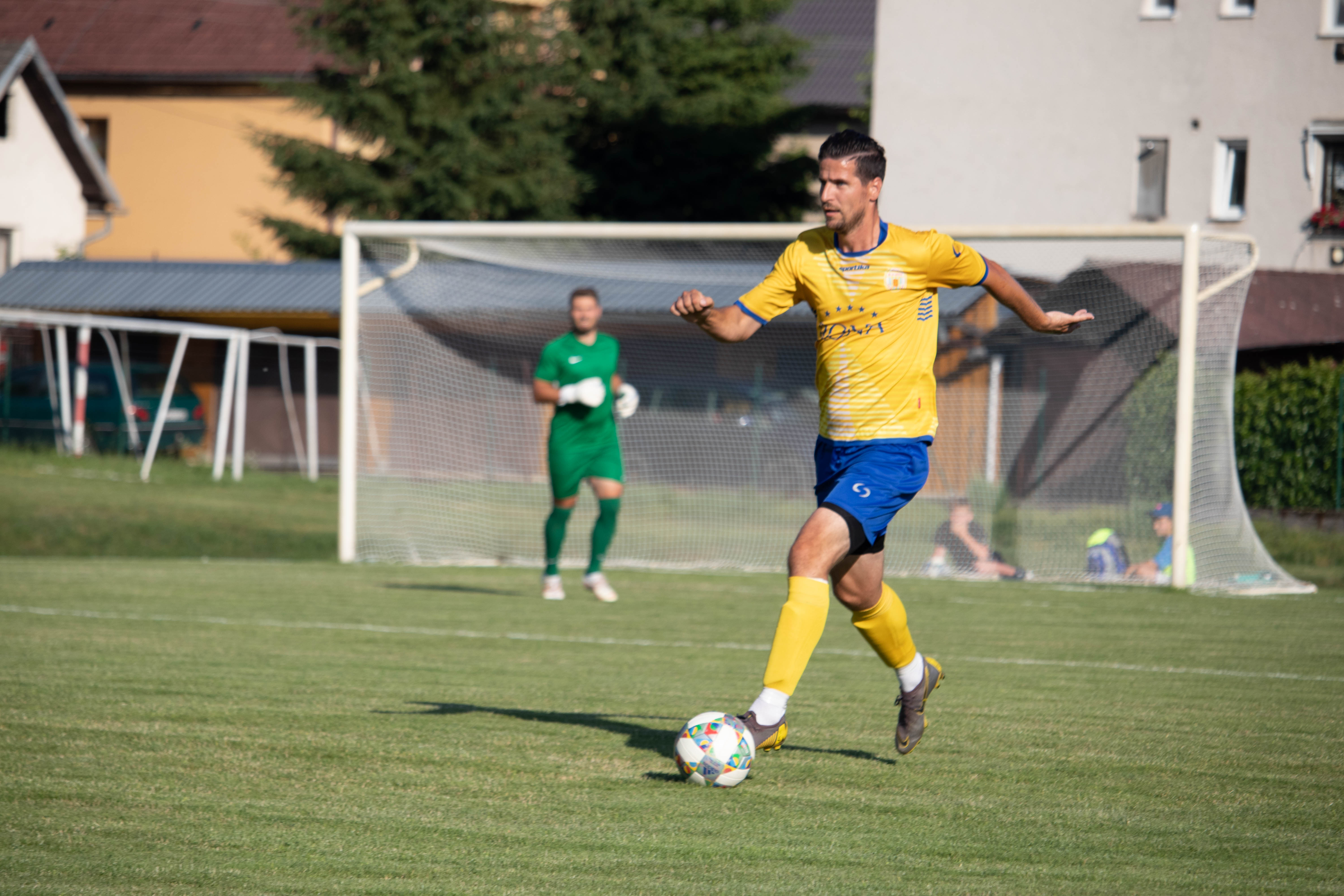

Personal information
- Full name: Marko Radić
- Date of birth: 1 October 1985 (age 41)
- Place of birth: Belgrade, SFR Yugoslavia
- Height: 1.88 m (6 ft 2 in)
- Position: Defender

Team information
- Current team: TJ Spartak Kvašov

Youth career
- Obilić
- Radnički Beograd

Senior career*
Years	Team	Apps	(Gls)
2008	Čadca		
2009–2010	Púchov		
2010–2011	Ružomberok	17	(0)
2012–2016	Wisła Płock	98	(7)
2016–2019	Opava	24	(1)
2020	TJ Spartak Kvašov		
2020–2024	Crystal Lednické Rovne		
2024–	TJ Spartak Kvašov		
- * Club domestic league appearances and goals as of 30 September 2024

Marko Radić (Serbian Cyrillic: Марко Радић, (born 1 October 1985) is a Serbian footballer who plays as a defender for Slovak amateur club TJ Spartak Kvašov.

== Honours ==
Wisła Płock

- II liga East: 2012–13
