= Marek Kodr =

Czech footballer (born 1996)

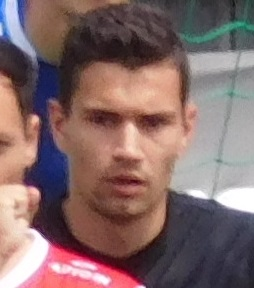

Personal information
- Date of birth: 17 August 1996 (age 30)
- Place of birth: Prague, Czech Republic
- Height: 1.92 m (6 ft 4 in)
- Position: Centre back

Team information
- Current team: Arezzo
- Number: 29

Youth career
- 2002–2014: Slavia Prague

Senior career*
Years	Team	Apps	(Gls)
2014–2017	Slavia Prague	15	(0)
2015	→ Varnsdorf (loan)	9	(0)
2016	→ Baník Sokolov (loan)	8	(1)
2017–2020	Příbram	65	(6)
2019–2020	→ Slavoj Vyšehrad (loan)	11	(6)
2020–	Arezzo	10	(0)

International career
2011–2012	Czech Republic U16	3	(0)
2012–2013	Czech Republic U17	2	(1)
2013–2014	Czech Republic U18	19	(1)
2014	Czech Republic U19	3	(0)
- * Club domestic league appearances and goals as of 19:19, 24 April 2021 (UTC)

Marek Kodr (born 17 August 1996) is a professional Czech footballer who plays as a defender for S.S. Arezzo.

He made his career league debut for SK Slavia Prague on 10 August 2014 in a 4–1 home win against FC Slovan Liberec, one week before his 18th birthday.
