= Roman Fischer (footballer) =

Czech football player

Personal information
- Date of birth: 24 March 1983 (age 43)
- Place of birth: Aš, Czechoslovakia
- Height: 1.75 m (5 ft 9 in)
- Position: Midfielder

Team information
- Current team: FC Zbrojovka Brno
- Number: 18

Senior career*
Years	Team	Apps	(Gls)
2004–2006	Kunovice	55	(3)
2006–2007	Jakubčovice	26	(1)
2007–2008	Slovácko	20	(2)
2008–2012	Hradec Králové	98	(16)
2012–	Senica	0	(0)
2012–2013	→ Karviná (loan)	23	(3)
2013–	→ FC Zbrojovka Brno (loan)	20	(1)

International career^{‡}
1999	Czech Republic U15	3	(0)
1999–2000	Czech Republic U16	11	(0)
2000–2001	Czech Republic U17	14	(1)
2001–2002	Czech Republic U19	4	(0)
2002	Czech Republic U20	1	(0)
- * Club domestic league appearances and goals as of 4 June 2013 ‡ National team caps and goals as of 4 June 2011

Roman Fischer (born 24 March 1983) is a Czech football player who currently plays for FC Zbrojovka Brno on loan from Senica. He was once the club captain of his former team FC Hradec Králové.
