= Donneil Moukanza =

French footballer

Donnell Moukanza
Personal information
- Date of birth: 27 February 1991 (age 35)
- Place of birth: Paris, France
- Height: 1.87 m (6 ft 2 in)
- Position: Forward

Team information
- Current team: Blanc-Mesnil SF

Youth career
- Pierrefitte-sur-Seine
- U.S St Denis
- 2008–2009: Nancy

Senior career*
Years	Team	Apps	(Gls)
2009–2010	Nancy B	18	(3)
2010–2011	Epinal	12	(1)
2011–2012	Ivry	27	(1)
2012	Aubervilliers	1	(0)
2013	Paris FC B	5	(0)
2013–2014	Valence	18	(5)
2014–2015	Zbrojovka Brno	22	(9)
2016	Slavia Sofia	9	(4)
2016	Aris Limassol	3	(0)
2017–2019	Barnet FC	48	(19)
2019	Hamrun Spartans	6	(1)
2019–	Blanc-Mesnil SF	2	(0)
- * Club domestic league appearances and goals as of 00:04, 8 December 2019 (UTC)

Donneil Mike Moukanza (born 27 February 1993 in Paris) is a French footballer who plays as a forward for Maltese club Hamrun Spartans.

== Career ==
Moukanza started his career with Nancy B.
