= Jasmin B. Frelih =

Slovenian writer, editor and translator

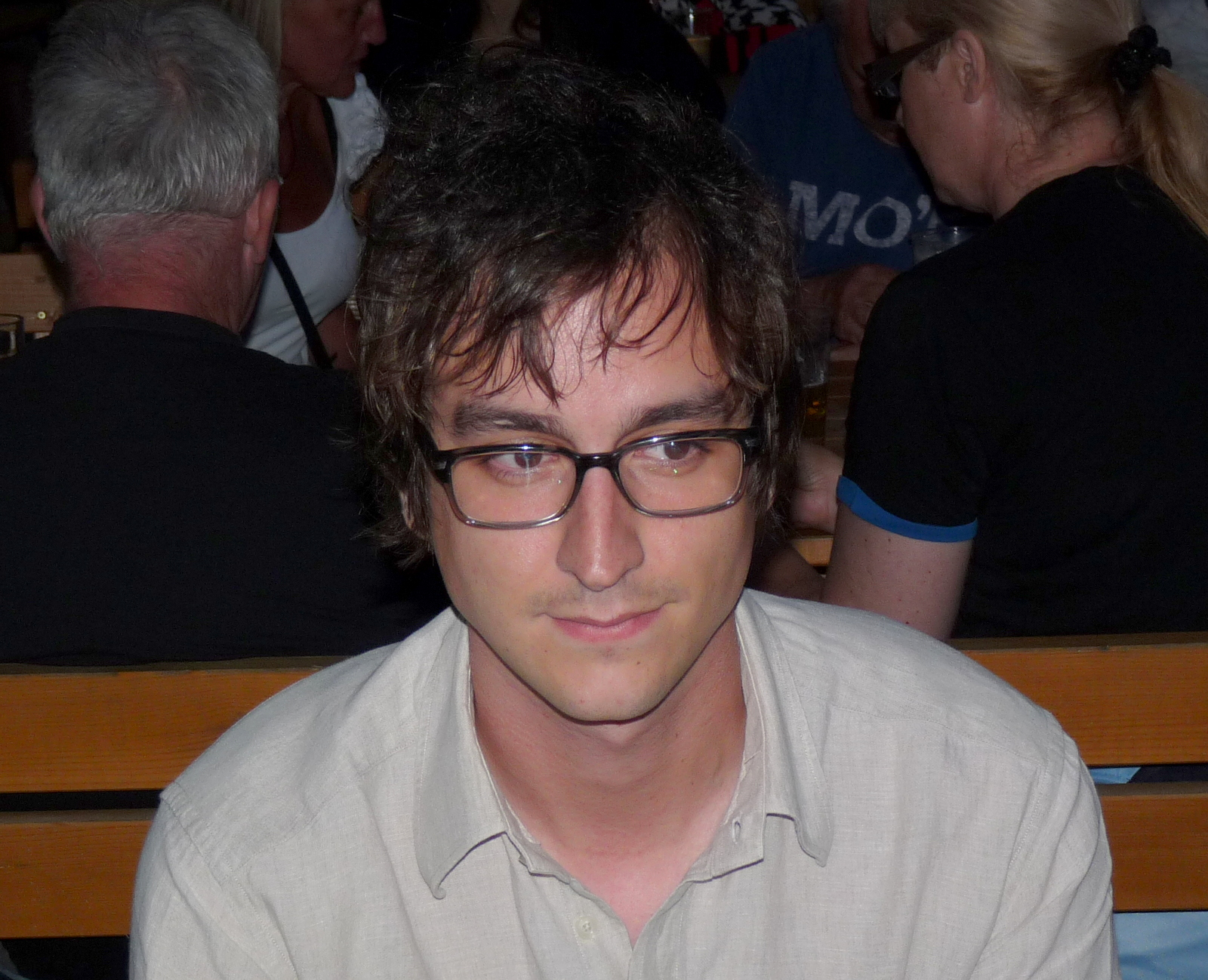
Jasmin Frelih.

Jasmin Frelih (born 1986) is a Slovenian writer, editor and translator. He was born in Kranj, Slovenia, in 1986. He studied literature at the University of Ljubljana.

== Works ==
Frelih's first novel Na/pol appeared in 2013, and won the best literary debut award at the Slovenian Book Fair. It also won the 2016 EU Prize for Literature. In/Half, an English translation by Jason Blake, was published by Oneworld Publications in November 2018

His first short story collection Ideoluzije (Tiny Ideologies) was published in 2015.

He is an editor of I.D.I.O.T., a literary journal, and his writings and translations have appeared in leading literary magazines in Slovenia. He also translates from Slovenian into English and vice versa.
