= Matúš Lacko =

Slovak footballer

Personal information
- Full name: Matúš Lacko
- Date of birth: 12 April 1987 (age 39)
- Place of birth: Bratislava, Czechoslovakia
- Height: 1.73 m (5 ft 8 in)
- Position: Defensive midfielder

Team information
- Current team: FC Vysočina Jihlava
- Number: 22

Youth career
- –2004: Malacky FO
- 2004–2005: Slovan Bratislava

Senior career*
Years	Team	Apps	(Gls)
2006–2015	Znojmo	125	(6)
2015–2016	Brno	40	(0)
2017	SC Retz		
2017–2019	Znojmo	42	(3)
2019–	Jihlava	188	(11)
- * Club domestic league appearances and goals as of 28 May 2026

Matúš Lacko (born 12 April 1987) is a Slovak professional footballer who plays as a midfielder for Czech National Football League club Vysočina Jihlava, which he currently captains.

== Club career ==
=== Youth career ===
A native of Bratislava, Lacko lived in Malacky until he was eight years old, where he started playing football with the local club FC Malacky. He also played in the youth team of Slovan Bratislava. He then went on a trial with the then second league team Dosta Bystrc.

=== Later career ===
Lacko joined 1. SC Znojmo in 2005, when the club was playing in the Moravian-Silesian Football League. With the club, he helped the club get promotion from the third Czech league to the second and in the 2012/13 season to the first. In the summer of 2015, Lacko changed jerseys and after ten years he moved to another Moravian club, FC Zbrojovka Brno. He played in 40 league matches for Zbrojovka, without scoring a goal. In December 2016, after the autumn part of the 2016/17 season, he left the club. On 12 July 2017, it was announced that Lacko would be returning to Znojmo.
