= Jiří Janoščín =

Czech footballer

Personal information
- Date of birth: 8 October 1992 (age 34)
- Place of birth: Brno, Czechoslovakia
- Height: 1.79 m (5 ft 10 1/2 in)
- Position: Midfielder

Team information
- Current team: Opava
- Number: 6

Youth career
- 1999–2005: FC Dosta Bystrc-Kníničky
- 2005–2006: FC Komín
- 2006–2008: FC Dosta Bystrc-Kníničky
- 2009–2011: FC Zbrojovka Brno

Senior career*
Years	Team	Apps	(Gls)
2011–2012	FC Zbrojovka Brno B	27	(0)
2009–2016	FC Zbrojovka Brno	0	(0)
2011–2012	→ FC Sparta Brno (loan)	4	(0)
2013	→ 1. HFK Olomouc (loan)	16	(2)
2015–2016	→ FK Fotbal Třinec (loan)	36	(2)
2016–2021	FK Fotbal Třinec	131	(1)
2021–	Opava	124	(9)
- * Club domestic league appearances and goals as of 28 May 2026

Jiří Janoščín (born 8 October 1992, in Brno) is a Czech football player who currently plays for Opava.
