= Daniel Přerovský =

Czech footballer (born 1992)

Personal information
- Date of birth: 5 March 1992 (age 34)
- Place of birth: Vyškov, Czechoslovakia
- Height: 1.74 m (5 ft 8 1/2 in)
- Position: Midfielder

Team information
- Current team: Blansko
- Number: 77

Youth career
- 1997–2003: SK Slavkov u Brna
- 2003–2006: 1. FK Drnovice
- 2006–2009: 1. FC Slovácko
- 2009–2010: FC Zbrojovka Brno

Senior career*
Years	Team	Apps	(Gls)
2010–2014	Zbrojovka Brno	30	(1)
2010	→ Sparta Brno (loan)	1	(0)
2014–2015	Líšeň		
2015–2019	Vyškov		
2019–	Blansko		
- * Club domestic league appearances and goals as of 31 August 2020

Daniel Přerovský (born 5 March 1992) is a professional Czech football player currently playing for MFK Vyškov. He made 30 league appearances and scored one goal for FC Zbrojovka Brno over the course of three seasons. After not making a single appearance for the team in the 2014–15 Czech First League season, he moved to SK Líšeň in the Moravian–Silesian Football League, the third tier of Czech football. He then joined Vyškov in the third level of Czech football in the autumn of 2015.
