= Karel Hrubeš =

Czech footballer

Personal information
- Full name: Karel Hrubeš
- Date of birth: 16 March 1993 (age 33)
- Place of birth: Prague, Czech Republic
- Height: 1.99 m (6 ft 6 in)
- Position: Goalkeeper

Team information
- Current team: Zápy

Youth career
- TJ Sokol Řepy
- AC Sparta Prague
- SK Slavia Prague

Senior career*
Years	Team	Apps	(Gls)
2012–2016	Slavia Prague	16	(0)
2016	→ Slovan Bratislava (loan)	1	(0)
2016–2021	Viktoria Žižkov	51	(0)
2019	→ Motorlet Prague (loan)	6	(0)
2021–	Zápy		

International career
2011	Czech Republic U18	2	(0)
2014	Czech Republic U21	1	(0)
- * Club domestic league appearances and goals as of 23:44, 13 January 2020 (UTC)

Karel Hrubeš (born 16 March 1993) is a professional Czech football goalkeeper currently playing for Zápy.

== Career ==
He made his career league debut for Slavia Prague on 26 July 2014 in a 2–1 away win at Slovácko.
