= Jan Hála =

Czech footballer

Personal information
- Date of birth: 3 June 1996 (age 30)
- Place of birth: České Budějovice, Czech Republic
- Height: 1.78 m (5 ft 10 in)
- Position: Midfielder

Team information
- Current team: SK České Budějovice
- Number: 12

Youth career
- SK České Budějovice

Senior career*
Years	Team	Apps	(Gls)
2014–	SK České Budějovice	29	(1)

International career^{‡}
2007–2008	Czech Republic U16	11	(2)
2008–2009	Czech Republic U17	8	(1)
2009–2010	Czech Republic U18	10	(1)
2010–2011	Czech Republic U19	18	(0)
2012–	Czech Republic U20	1	(0)
2012–	Czech Republic U21	1	(0)
- * Club domestic league appearances and goals as of 28 October 2016 ‡ National team caps and goals as of 28 October 2016

Jan Hála (born 3 June 1996) is a professional Czech football midfielder currently playing for SK České Budějovice.

He made his league debut on 7 March 2014 in a 2-2 Czech National Football League home win against Slovan Varnsdorf. He scored his first league goal on 4 April 2012 in a 1–0 home win against Loko Vltavín.
