= Tomáš Weber =

Czech footballer

Personal information
- Date of birth: 26 May 1996 (age 30)
- Place of birth: Vyškov, Czech Republic
- Height: 1.78 m (5 ft 10 in)
- Position: Midfielder

Team information
- Current team: Fotbal Třinec
- Number: 9

Youth career
- 2002–2012: Baumit Jablonec
- 2012–2015: Zbrojovka Brno

Senior career*
Years	Team	Apps	(Gls)
2015–2016	Zbrojovka Brno	3	(0)
2015	→ SK Líšeň (loan)	9	(1)
2016	→ 1. SC Znojmo (loan)	12	(2)
2017–2020	MFK Karviná	23	(1)
2018–2019	→ Fotbal Třinec (loan)	22	(3)
2020–	Fotbal Třinec	26	(1)
- * Club domestic league appearances and goals as of 18:31, 10 February 2021 (UTC)

Tomáš Weber (born 26 May 1996) is a Czech football player who currently plays for Fotbal Třinec in the Czech National Football League.

== Personal life ==
He was born in Vyškov, where his father, a former football player Jozef Weber, played for FK Drnovice.

== Football career ==
=== Early career ===
Than his family moved to Jablonec where he started playing football for FK Jablonec. In his 15 years he moved to Brno.
