= Tomáš Dočekal =

Czech footballer

Personal information
- Date of birth: 24 May 1989 (age 37)
- Place of birth: Smržovka, Czechoslovakia
- Height: 1.93 m (6 ft 4 in)
- Position: Forward

Team information
- Current team: Přepeře
- Number: 11

Youth career
- FK Lučany nad Nisou
- Jablonec
- Viktoria Žižkov

Senior career*
Years	Team	Apps	(Gls)
2010–2012	Viktoria Žižkov	6	(2)
2010	→ Zemplín Michalovce (loan)		
2012–2015	Piast Gliwice	30	(4)
2014	→ GKS Tychy (loan)	9	(2)
2014	→ Slovácko (loan)	6	(0)
2015–2018	Viktoria Žižkov	75	(25)
2017–2018	→ Floridsdorfer AC (loan)	18	(0)
2019	ViOn Zlaté Moravce	13	(0)
2019–2020	Jablonec B	16	(6)
2019–2020	Jablonec	4	(0)
2020	Slavoj Vyšehrad	6	(0)
2021	Příbram	12	(0)
2021	→ Sokol Hostouň (loan)	7	(3)
2022	Sokol Hostouň	14	(4)
2022–2023	Zápy	21	(1)
2023–	Přepeře	26	(1)
- * Club domestic league appearances and goals as of 09:45, 24 May 2024 (UTC)

Tomáš Dočekal (born 24 May 1989) is a Czech professional footballer who plays as a forward for Přepeře.

== Career ==
=== Jablonec ===
In the summer 2019, Dočekal joined FK Jablonec to play for the club's B-team.

== Honours ==
Piast Gliwice

- I liga: 2011–12
