= Radek Buchta =

Czech football player

Personal information
- Date of birth: 22 April 1989 (age 37)
- Place of birth: Brno, Czechoslovakia
- Height: 1.80 m (5 ft 11 in)
- Position: Defensive midfielder

Team information
- Current team: Blansko
- Number: 17

Youth career
- 1995–2000: Sokol Tvarožná
- 2000–2011: FC Zbrojovka Brno

Senior career*
Years	Team	Apps	(Gls)
2011–2012	FC Zbrojovka Brno	18	(0)
2012–2014	1. SC Znojmo	65	(2)
2012–2013	→ FC Slovan Rosice (loan)	3	(0)
2015–2018	FC Zbrojovka Brno	52	(0)
2018−	FK Blansko	2	(0)
- * Club domestic league appearances and goals as of 31 August 2020

Radek Buchta (born 22 April 1989) is a Czech football player who currently plays for Blansko.
