= Václav Prošek =

Czech footballer

Personal information
- Date of birth: 8 April 1993 (age 33)
- Place of birth: Czech Republic
- Height: 1.75 m (5 ft 9 in)
- Position: Midfielder

Team information
- Current team: Viktoria Žižkov
- Number: 12

Senior career*
Years	Team	Apps	(Gls)
2011–2017	Slavia Prague	5	(0)
2015	→ Baník Sokolov (loan)	5	(0)
2016	→ Bohemians 1905 (loan)	2	(0)
2016	→ Olympia Prague (loan)		
2017–2019	Táborsko	33	(1)
2019–2022	Ústí nad Labem	78	(9)
2022	→ Teplice (loan)	13	(0)
2022–	Viktoria Žižkov	94	(18)

International career
2009–2010	Czech Republic U17	6	(1)
2010–2011	Czech Republic U18	8	(1)
2011–2012	Czech Republic U19	7	(0)
- * Club domestic league appearances and goals as of 28 May 2026

Václav Prošek (born 8 April 1993) is a Czech football player who currently plays for Viktoria Žižkov. He has represented the Czech Republic at under-19 level.
