= Muamer Avdić =

Bosnian-Herzegovinian footballer

Personal information
- Full name: Muamer Avdić
- Date of birth: 7 January 1993 (age 33)
- Place of birth: Mostar, Bosnia-Herzegovina
- Height: 1.83 m (6 ft 0 in)
- Position: Defender

Team information
- Current team: Start Brno

Youth career
- 1999–2009: Lokomotiva Mostar

Senior career*
| Years | Team | Apps | (Gls) |
| 2009 | Viktoria Plzeň | 0 | (0) |
| 2010–2012 | Znojmo | 29 | (1) |
| 2013–2015 | Zbrojovka Brno | 1 | (0) |
| 2014–2015 | → Baník Most (loan) | 17 | (1) |
| 2015–2017 | Fotbal Třinec | 11 | (0) |
| 2017 | Písek | | |
| 2018–2020 | Znojmo | 29 | (2) |
| 2020- | Start Brno | | |

International career^{‡}
| 2012 | Bosnia-Herzegovina U21 | 2 | (0) |
- * Club domestic league appearances and goals as of 8 March 2019 ‡ National team caps and goals as of 8 March 2019

Muamer Avdić (born 7 January 1993 in Mostar) is a Bosnian-Herzegovinian football player who currently plays for Start Brno.

== Club career ==
He played several seasons for Czech side 1. SC Znojmo.
