= Lukáš Vraštil =

Czech footballer (born 1994)

Personal information
- Date of birth: 10 March 1994 (age 32)
- Place of birth: Jilemnice, Czech Republic
- Height: 1.84 m (6 ft 0 in)
- Position: Centre back

Team information
- Current team: Sigma Olomouc
- Number: 19

Youth career
- 2000–2006: Sokol Železnice
- 2006–2013: Mladá Boleslav

Senior career*
Years	Team	Apps	(Gls)
2013–2016	Mladá Boleslav	11	(0)
2014–2015	→ Ústí nad Labem (loan)	26	(1)
2016	→ Baník Ostrava (loan)	11	(1)
2016–2019	Zbrojovka Brno	61	(2)
2019–2022	Fastav Zlín	21	(2)
2022–	Sigma Olomouc	50	(1)

International career
2009–2010	Czech Republic U16	3	(0)
2015	Czech Republic U20	1	(0)
2014–2016	Czech Republic U21	7	(0)
- * Club domestic league appearances and goals as of 17 June 2025

Lukáš Vraštil (born 10 March 1994) is a Czech professional footballer who plays for Sigma Olomouc in the Czech First League.

== Honours ==
Sigma Olomouc

- Czech Cup: 2024–25
