= Marek Červenka =

Czech footballer

Personal information
- Full name: Marek Červenka
- Date of birth: 17 December 1992 (age 33)
- Place of birth: Prague, Czechoslovakia
- Height: 1.82 m (6 ft 0 in)
- Position: Forward

Team information
- Current team: Česká Lípa

Senior career*
Years	Team	Apps	(Gls)
2012–2016	Slavia Prague	2	(0)
2012	→ Vlašim (loan)	12	(0)
2013	→ Viktoria Žižkov (loan)	7	(0)
2014	→ Sokolov (loan)	14	(7)
2015–2016	→ Baník Ostrava (loan)	18	(1)
2016–2019	Teplice	44	(5)
2019	→ Linfield (loan)	10	(0)
2019–2020	Baník Sokolov	27	(3)
2020–2022	Vlašim	32	(11)
2022–2024	Dukla Prague	43	(5)
2022	→ Pardubice (loan)	8	(0)
2022	→→ Pardubice B	3	(0)
2024–2026	Ústí nad Labem	54	(28)
2026–	Česká Lípa	8	(2)
- * Club domestic league appearances and goals as of 28 May 2026

Marek Červenka (born 5 February 1991) is a Czech footballer who currently plays as a forward for Česká Lípa.

== Career ==
On 25 January 2019, Červenka joined NIFL Premiership side Linfield on loan from Teplice until the end of the season.

== Personal life ==
Marek's older brother Roman (born 1985) is a professional ice hockey player.
