= Pavel Pilík =

Czech footballer

Personal information
- Date of birth: 13 February 1992 (age 34)
- Place of birth: Příbram, Czechoslovakia
- Height: 1.75 m (5 ft 9 in)
- Position: Right midfielder

Team information
- Current team: SV Waidhofen/Thaya
- Number: 9

Youth career
- Příbram

Senior career*
Years	Team	Apps	(Gls)
2010–2017	Příbram	45	(1)
2013	→ Bohemians Prague (loan)	10	(0)
2015	→ Králův Dvůr (loan)		
2016	→ MAS Táborsko (loan)	11	(0)
2016	→ Slavoj Vyšehrad (loan)		
2017–2018	Ústí nad Labem	25	(7)
2018–2019	MAS Táborsko	29	(3)
2019–2020	Vlašim	15	(1)
2020–	SV Waidhofen/Thaya	8	(1)

International career
	Czech Republic U16	4	(1)
	Czech Republic U17	7	(3)
2009–2010	Czech Republic U18	10	(1)
	Czech Republic U19	3	(0)
- * Club domestic league appearances and goals as of 19:19, 26 October 2020 (UTC)

Pavel Pilík (born 13 February 1992 in Příbram) is a professional Czech football player who plays for Austrian club SV Waidhofen/Thaya.

== Career ==
=== SV Waidhofen/Thaya ===
In February 2020, Pilík moved to Austria and signed with SV Sparkasse Waidhofen/Thaya.
