= Pavel Košťál =

Czech footballer (born 1980)

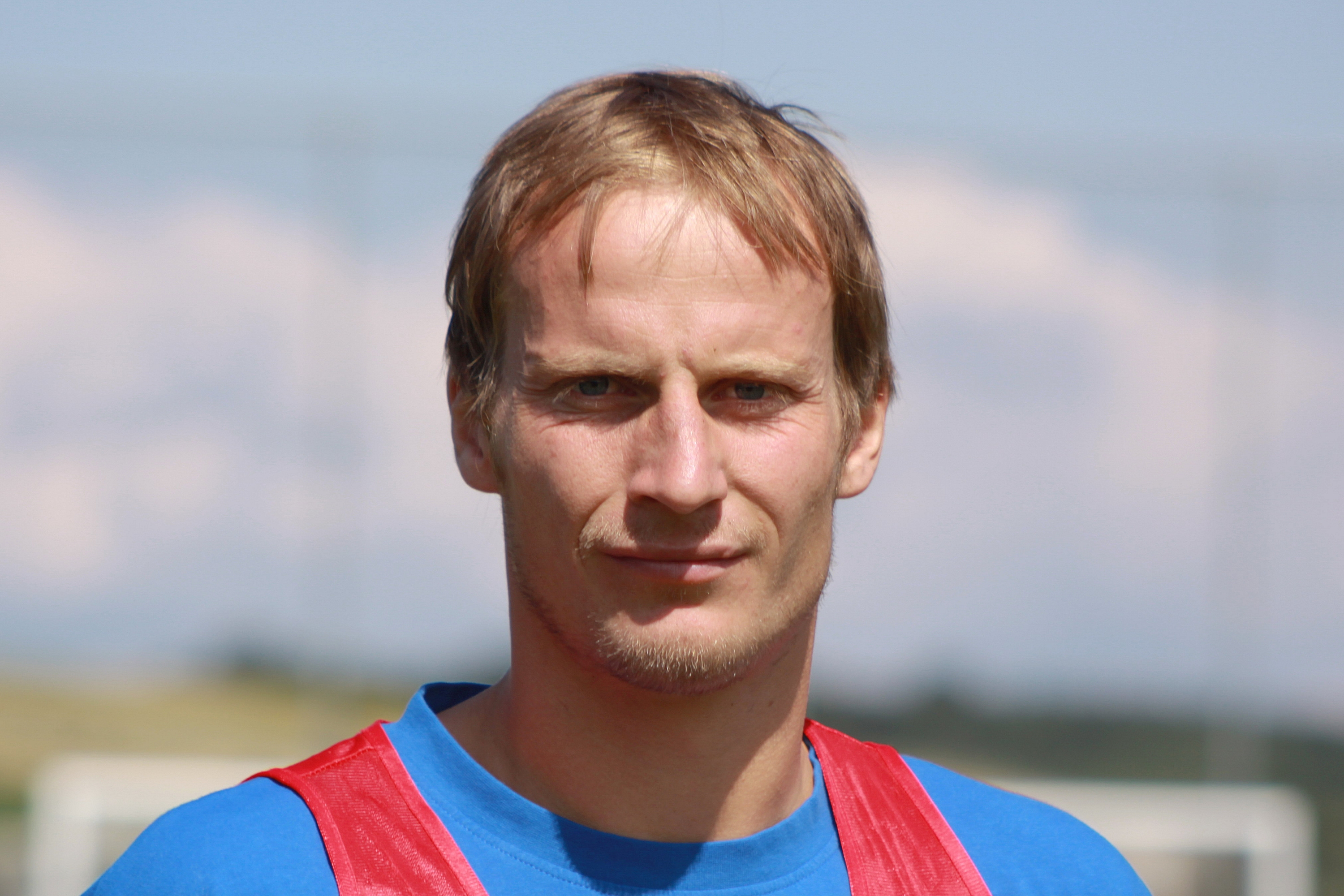

Personal information
- Full name: Pavel Košťál
- Date of birth: 17 September 1980 (age 46)
- Place of birth: Hradec Králové, Czechoslovakia
- Height: 1.92 m (6 ft 4 in)
- Position: Centre back

Team information
- Current team: Karviná
- Number: 14

Senior career*
Years	Team	Apps	(Gls)
2001–2002	Hradec Králové	2	(0)
2003–2009	Slovan Liberec	129	(5)
2009–2011	Wiener Neustadt	60	(4)
2011–2012	Hansa Rostock	10	(0)
2013–2016	Zbrojovka Brno	70	(2)
2016	Senica	2	(0)
2016–2017	Karviná	29	(0)
2018–	Viktoria Žižkov	12	(0)
2018–	Sokol Živanice	29	(0)
- * Club domestic league appearances and goals as of 30 June 2019

Pavel Košťál (born 17 September 1980 in Hradec Králové) is a Czech footballer who is currently plays as a defender with Sokol Živanice. He is known for his strength and ability in the air.
