= Daniel Procházka =

Czech footballer

Personal information
- Date of birth: 5 March 1995 (age 31)
- Place of birth: Czech Republic
- Height: 1.81 m (5 ft 11 in)
- Positions: Midfielder; winger

Youth career
- Teplice

Senior career*
| Years | Team | Apps | (Gls) |
| –2015 | Teplice B | | |
| 2016–2019 | Ústí nad Labem | 73 | (8) |
| 2019–2021 | Hradec Králové | 21 | (2) |
| 2021 | → Slavoj Vyšehrad (loan) | 6 | (0) |
| 2021–2022 | Příbram | 28 | (3) |
- * Club domestic league appearances and goals

Daniel Procházka (born 5 March 1995) is a Czech footballer is a former professional footballer who last played for Příbram.

== Career ==
As a youth player, Procházka had operations on both knees.

In 2013, he trialed for the youth academy of Barcelona, one of Spain's most successful clubs.

Before the second half of 2015/16, Procházka signed for Ústí in the Czech second division after playing for the youth academy of Czech top flight side Teplice where he made 76 appearances and scored 9 goals.

Procházka is eligible to represent Vietnam internationally through his father.
