= Boštjan Frelih =

Slovenian footballer (born 1993)

Personal information
- Date of birth: 10 February 1993 (age 33)
- Place of birth: Ljubljana, Slovenia
- Height: 1.90 m (6 ft 3 in)
- Positions: Left-back; centre-back

Team information
- Current team: Žiri

Youth career
- –2012: Gorica

Senior career*
Years	Team	Apps	(Gls)
2012–2014	Gorica	8	(1)
2013	→ Brda (loan)	22	(5)
2014	→ Adria (loan)	10	(2)
2014–2015	Krško	20	(0)
2015–2016	Zbrojovka Brno	5	(0)
2016	→ Inter Zaprešić (loan)	1	(0)
2016–2017	Drava Ptuj	6	(0)
2017–2018	AŠK Bravo	11	(1)
2018	Tabor Sežana	9	(1)
2018	Bilje	11	(0)
2019–	Žiri	75	(16)
- * Club domestic league appearances and goals as of 20 August 2023

Boštjan Frelih (born 10 February 1993) is a Slovenian footballer who plays as a defender for Žiri.
