= Aleš Schuster =

Czech footballer (born 1981)

Personal information
- Date of birth: 26 October 1981 (age 45)
- Place of birth: Brno, Czechoslovakia
- Height: 1.80 m (5 ft 11 in)
- Position: Centre back

Senior career*
Years	Team	Apps	(Gls)
2001–2006	Zbrojovka Brno	101	(1)
2006–2007	Dosta Bystrc	21	(1)
2008–2009	Zvijezda Gradačac		
2010–2013	Zimbru Chişinău	48	(3)
2013	Dacia Chișinău	5	(0)
2013–2016	Zbrojovka Brno	49	(3)
2016–2022	Prostějov	113	(1)

International career
2002	Czech Republic U20	1	(0)
2002–2003	Czech Republic U21	17	(1)
- * Club domestic league appearances and goals

Aleš Schuster (born 26 October 1981) is a retired Czech football defender who played for Zbrojovka Brno. He made over 100 appearances in the Gambrinus liga. He also played international football at under-21 level for Czech Republic U21.

He later played in Bosnia and Moldova.
