= Martin Sus (footballer, born 1989) =

Czech footballer

Personal information
- Date of birth: 8 May 1989 (age 37)
- Place of birth: Brno, Czechoslovakia
- Height: 1.86 m (6 ft 1 in)
- Position: Defender

Team information
- Current team: Poysbrunn/F. SCU
- Number: 5

Youth career
- 1994–1995: ČAFC Židenice
- 1995–2007: Zbrojovka Brno
- 2007: FC Twente
- 2008–2009: Zbrojovka Brno

Senior career*
Years	Team	Apps	(Gls)
2009–2014	Zbrojovka Brno	27	(1)
2014–2015	Líšeň	10	(0)
2015–2022	Prostějov	141	(7)
2021–2022	→ Tatran Bohunice (loan)		
2022–2023	UFC Obritz	23	(2)
2023–	Poysbrunn/F. SCU	12	(0)

International career^{‡}
2007	Czech Republic U-18	2	(0)
- * Club domestic league appearances and goals as of 18:06, 26 November 2023 (UTC) ‡ National team caps and goals as of 6 September 2013

Martin Sus (born 8 May 1989) is a Czech football player who played for Zbrojovka Brno and 1. SK Prostějov. He represented his country at youth level.
