= Miroslav Keresteš =

Slovak footballer

Personal information
- Full name: Miroslav Keresteš
- Date of birth: 30 July 1989 (age 37)
- Place of birth: Prešov, Czechoslovakia
- Height: 1.76 m (5 ft 9 in)
- Position: Left back

Youth career
- 1997–2004: ŠK Chmeľov
- 2005–2008: Tatran Prešov

Senior career*
Years	Team	Apps	(Gls)
2009–2011	Pivovar Veľký Šariš		
2011–2012	Lokomotíva Košice	?	(12)
2013	Slavia Orlová-Lutyně	14	(2)
2013	Opava	15	(0)
2014–2016	Zbrojovka Brno	52	(1)
2016–2018	Mladá Boleslav	14	(0)
2017–2018	→ Vysočina Jihlava (loan)	18	(0)
2019	Tatran Prešov	13	(0)
2019–2020	Partizán Bardejov	19	(0)
- * Club domestic league appearances and goals as of 20 February 2021

Miroslav Keresteš (born 30 July 1989) is a Slovak football defender who last played for Partizán Bardejov.

== Club career ==
=== FC Zbrojovka Brno ===
He made his professional debut for Zbrojovka Brno against Sparta Prague on 24 February 2014.
