= Josef Čtvrtníček =

Czech footballer

Personal information
- Date of birth: 13 February 1990 (age 36)
- Place of birth: Vyškov, Czechoslovakia
- Height: 1.94 m (6 ft 4 1/2 in)
- Position: Forward

Team information
- Current team: SK Wullersdorf

Youth career
- 1996–2008: Drnovice
- 2008–2009: Baník Ostrava

Senior career*
Years	Team	Apps	(Gls)
2009–2012	Slovácko B	46	(26)
2011–2012	Slovácko	10	(1)
2012	→ Ústí nad Labem (loan)	14	(0)
2013	→ Fotbal Třinec (loan)	25	(9)
2014	→ Sulko Zábřeh (loan)	14	(3)
2014	→ Vyškov (loan)	16	(14)
2015–2016	Zbrojovka Brno	7	(1)
2015	→ Líšeň (loan)	2	(2)
2015–2016	→ Sandecja Nowy Sącz (loan)	10	(1)
2016	Dukla Banská Bystrica	9	(0)
2017	Prostějov	12	(0)
2017–2018	Slavoj Vyšehrad	34	(17)
2018–2019	FK Zbuzany		
2019	Auerbach	19	(1)
2019–2021	Loko Vltavín	15	(4)
2021	FC Weesen	3	(3)
2021–2022	FC Willisau		
2022–2023	Znojmo	14	(3)
2023	TJ Rajhradice		
2023–	SK Wullersdorf		
- * Club domestic league appearances and goals as of 19:44, 23 February 2024 (UTC)

Josef Čtvrtníček (born 23 February 1990) is a Czech footballer who plays as a forward for Austrian club SK Wullersdorf.

== Career ==
In November 2017, Čtvrtníček joined Slavoj Vyšehrad. After the season, he moved to FK Zbuzany 1953. Čtvrtníček played for the club until 30 June 2019, where he moved to Germany and signed with VfB Auerbach for the rest of the season. In September 2019, Čtvrtníček returned to Czech Republic and signed for Loko Vltavín.
