= Stadion v Městských sadech =

Football stadium in Opava, Czech Republic

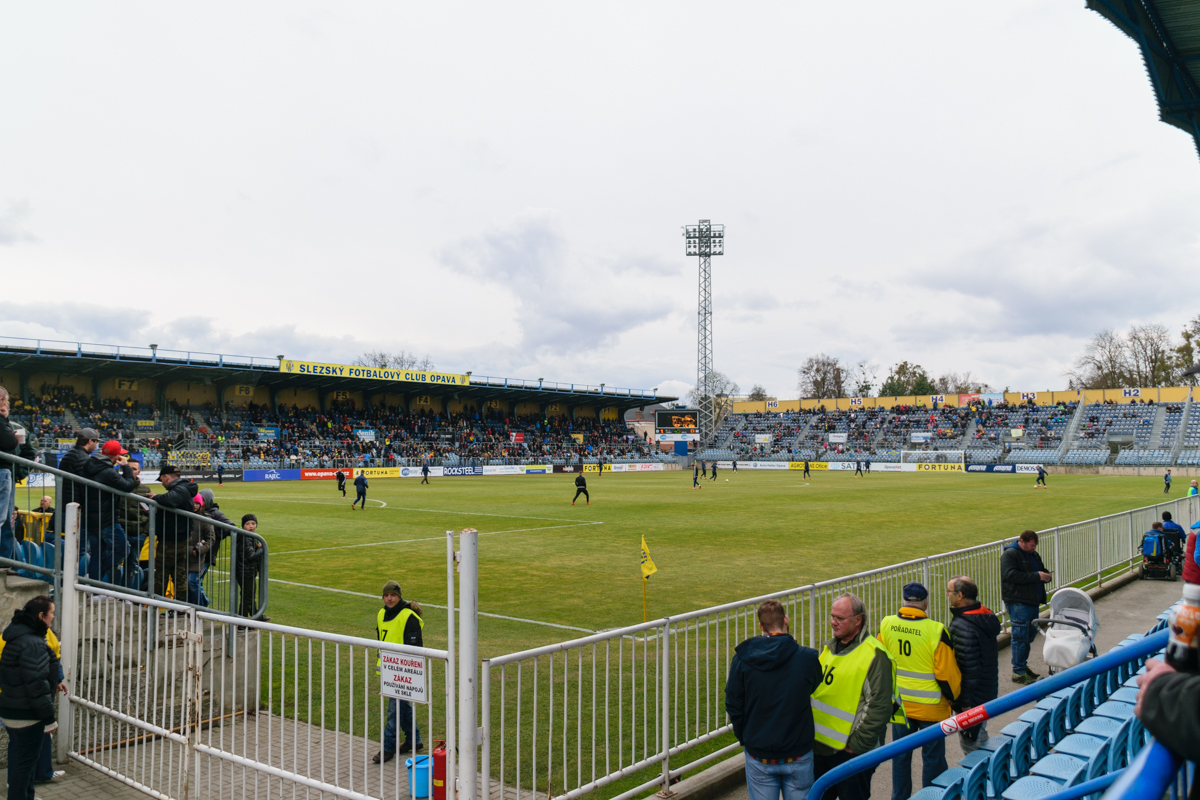
- Interactive map of Stadion v Městských sadech
- Location: Lípová 105, Opava, Czech Republic, 746 01
- Coordinates: 49°56′59.01″N 17°53′24.33″E
- Capacity: 7,524
- Field size: 105m x 68m

Construction
- Opened: 1973

Tenant
- SFC Opava

Stadion v Městských sadech is a football stadium in Opava, Czech Republic. It is the home stadium of SFC Opava and has a capacity of 7,524 seated places. It is located in the municipal park near the Opava River. In September 2024 the stadium flooded, with the water level reaching the third row of the F stand. It also caused damage to the stadium's changing rooms, as well as the immediate vicinity of the stadium. Later the same month, the Ligová fotbalová asociace announced financial aid amounting to 1.5 million Czech koruna for the restoration of the stadium.
