= Stanislav Vávra =

Czech footballer

Personal information
- Date of birth: 20 July 1993 (age 33)
- Place of birth: Kroměříž, Czechoslovakia
- Height: 1.80 m (5 ft 11 in)
- Position: Winger

Team information
- Current team: Příbram
- Number: 9

Youth career
- 1998–2009: FK Chropyně
- 2009–2010: Hanácká Slavia Kroměříž
- 2010–2011: Zbrojovka Brno

Senior career*
Years	Team	Apps	(Gls)
2011–2012	FC Zbrojovka Brno B	26	(7)
2012–2018	Zbrojovka Brno	49	(4)
2017	→ Fotbal Třinec (loan)	8	(0)
2017	→ ŠTK Šamorín (loan)	10	(2)
2018	→ Baník Sokolov (loan)	14	(2)
2018–2020	Baník Sokolov	57	(10)
2020–	Příbram	37	(5)

International career
2015	Czech Republic U-21	2	(0)
- * Club domestic league appearances and goals as of 23:50, 27 August 2021 (UTC)

Stanislav Vávra (born 20 July 1993 in Kroměříž) is a Czech football player who plays for 1. FK Příbram.
