= Milan Lutonský =

Czech footballer

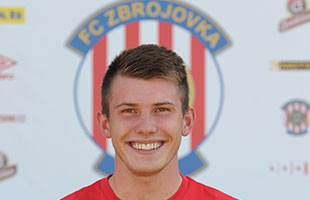

Personal information
- Date of birth: 10 August 1993 (age 33)
- Place of birth: Brno, Czechoslovakia
- Height: 1.74 m (5 ft 9 in)
- Position: Left midfielder

Team information
- Current team: 1. SK Prostějov (loan=
- Number: 23

Youth career
- 2001–2007: Drnovice
- 2007–2011: Zbrojovka Brno

Senior career*
Years	Team	Apps	(Gls)
2011–2018	Zbrojovka Brno	166	(7)
2019–2020	Jablonec	0	(0)
2019–2020	→ 1. SK Prostějov (loan)	42	(3)
2020–	SK Artis Brno	147	(9)
2026–	→ 1. SK Prostějov (loan)	11	(0)

International career^{‡}
2008	Czech Republic U-16	4	(0)
2011-2012	Czech Republic U-19	8	(1)
2012	Czech Republic U-20	1	(0)
- * Club domestic league appearances and goals as of 28 May 2026 ‡ National team caps and goals as of 31 July 2022

Milan Lutonský (born 10 August 1993 in Brno) is a Czech football player who plays for 1. SK Prostějov, on loan from SK Artis Brno.

== Career ==
On 14 January 2019, Lutonský joined FK Jablonec and was immediately loaned out to 1. SK Prostějov.
