= Jan Schaffartzik =

Czech footballer

Personal information
- Date of birth: 15 December 1987 (age 38)
- Place of birth: Czech Republic
- Height: 1.84 m (6 ft 0 in)
- Positions: Defender; midfielder

Team information
- Current team: Prostějov

Youth career
- Opava

Senior career*
Years	Team	Apps	(Gls)
2007–2021	Opava	229+	(27+)
2007-2008	→ Dolní Benešov (loan)		
2008-2009	→ Frýdek-Místek (loan)		
2011	→ Sulko Zábřeh (loan)		
2013	→ Hlučín (loan)		
2021–	Prostějov	48	(7)
- * Club domestic league appearances and goals as of 20 June 2023

Jan Schaffartzik (born 15 December 1987) is a Czech footballer who plays as a defender or midfielder for Prostějov.

== Career ==
Schaffartzik started his career with Czech third division side Opava, helping them achieve promotion to the Czech top flight.
