= Alois Hyčka =

Czech footballer (born 1990)

Personal information
- Date of birth: 22 July 1990 (age 36)
- Place of birth: Cheb, Czechoslovakia
- Height: 1.69 m (5 ft 7 in)
- Position: Full-back

Youth career
- Hvězda Cheb
- 2007–2009: Slavia Prague

Senior career*
Years	Team	Apps	(Gls)
2009–2012	Ústí nad Labem	49	(0)
2012–2016	Zbrojovka Brno	88	(7)
2015	→ Ústí nad Labem (loan)	11	(3)
2017–2023	Teplice	141	(3)
2023–2025	Ústí nad Labem	30	(0)
- * Club domestic league appearances and goals

Alois Hyčka (born 22 July 1990 in Cheb) is a Czech retired football player. He spent his career in Teplice, Ústí nad Labem and Zbrojovka Brno.

Hyčka retired in 2025 and plans to continue in football as a coach.
