= Pavel Zavadil =

Czech footballer (born 1978)

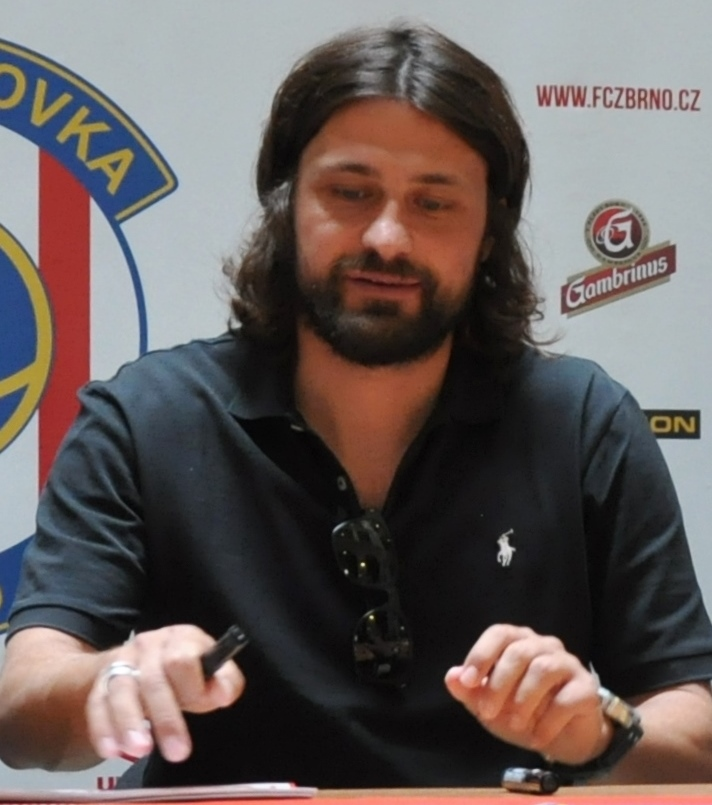
- Zavadil in 2014

Personal information
- Date of birth: 30 April 1978 (age 48)
- Place of birth: Olomouc, Czechoslovakia
- Height: 1.79 m (5 ft 10 in)
- Position: Midfielder

Youth career
- Sigma Olomouc

Senior career*
Years	Team	Apps	(Gls)
1999–2001	Drnovice	43	(1)
2001–2003	Sparta Prague	10	(0)
2003–2004	Marila Příbram	29	(6)
2004	Maccabi Haifa	10	(1)
2004–2005	Baník Ostrava	14	(0)
2005	Aris Thessaloniki		
2005	Mjällby	12	(5)
2006–2008	Öster	46	(9)
2008	→ Örgryte (loan)	26	(7)
2009–2010	Örgryte	54	(5)
2010–2012	Mjällby	30	(1)
2012–2017	Zbrojovka Brno	118	(17)
2017–2020	Opava	80	(5)
2021–2022	Zbrojovka Brno	10	(1)
- * Club domestic league appearances and goals

Pavel Zavadil (born 30 April 1978) is a Czech former professional footballer who played as a midfielder. He had stints at Zbrojovka Brno, Israeli club Maccabi Haifa and Swedish sides Mjällby AIF, Örgryte IS and Öster, among others.

== Career ==
In 2009 Zavadil signed a two-year contract with Swedish club Örgryte IS.

Zavadil ended his career as a player of SFC Opava and as the oldest player of the Czech First League in his forty-two years.
