= David Pašek =

Czech footballer (born 1989)

Personal information
- Date of birth: 27 October 1989 (age 37)
- Place of birth: Brno, Czechoslovakia
- Height: 1.81 m (5 ft 11 1/2 in)
- Position: Right midfielder

Team information
- Current team: Líšeň
- Number: 20

Youth career
- 1996–2008: Zbrojovka Brno

Senior career*
Years	Team	Apps	(Gls)
2008–2016	Zbrojovka Brno	126	(10)
2017	Karmiotissa	16	(3)
2017	Líšeň	15	(12)
2018–2019	Vítkovice	39	(5)
2019–2020	Prostějov	23	(0)
2020–	Líšeň	89	(5)
- * Club domestic league appearances and goals as of 25 June 2024

David Pašek (born 27 October 1989 in Brno) is a Czech football player who currently plays for Líšeň.
