= FK Blansko =

- Full name: Fotbalový klub Blansko
- Founded: 2004; 22 years ago
- Ground: Stadion na Údolní
- Capacity: 5,500
- Chairman: Zdeněk Veselý
- Manager: Lukáš Plšek
- League: Moravian-Silesian Football League
- 2025–26: 14th
- Website: fkblansko.cz

FK Blansko is a Czech football club located in Blansko in the South Moravian Region. The club plays in the Moravian-Silesian Football League.

The team's success in recent history was earning promotion to the Czech National Football League in 2020.
