= 2017–18 SK Slavia Prague season =

Slavia Prague
2017–18 season
- President: Jaroslav Tvrdík
- Head coach: Jaroslav Šilhavý (until 22 December); Jindřich Trpišovský (from 22 December)
- Stadium: Eden Arena
- Czech First League: 2nd
- Czech Cup: Winners
- UEFA Champions League: Play-off round
- UEFA Europa League: Group stage
- Top goalscorer: League: Milan Škoda (12); All: Milan Škoda (15)
Home colours	Away colours

The 2017–18 season was SK Slavia Prague's 25th season in the Czech First League. The team was competing in Czech First League, the Czech Cup, and the UEFA Champions League.

The season was Jaroslav Šilhavý's second in charge of the club after signing from FK Dukla Prague in the autumn of 2016. He was replaced by Jindřich Trpišovský in December 2017.

== Season events ==
On 14 May, Slavia gathered three points against Dukla Prague (match-week 28), which was sufficient to be mathematically assured that the team will finish ahead of Sparta in the league table.

== Squad ==
As of 23 February 2018

Note: Flags indicate national team as defined under FIFA eligibility rules; some limited exceptions apply. Players may hold more than one non-FIFA nationality.

No.	Pos.	Nation	Player
1	GK	CZE	Ondřej Kolář
3	DF	UKR	Eduard Sobol (on loan from Shakhtar)
4	DF	CZE	Jakub Jugas
5	DF	NOR	Per-Egil Flo
6	MF	CZE	Jan Sýkora
7	MF	POR	Danny
8	MF	CZE	Jaromír Zmrhal
9	MF	TKM	Ruslan Mingazow
10	MF	CZE	Josef Hušbauer
11	FW	CZE	Stanislav Tecl
12	MF	CZE	Pavel Bucha
13	DF	CMR	Michael Ngadeu-Ngadjui
14	FW	NED	Mick van Buren

No.	Pos.	Nation	Player
15	DF	CZE	Ondřej Kúdela
17	MF	SVK	Miroslav Stoch
18	DF	CZE	Jan Bořil
19	DF	CIV	Simon Deli
21	FW	CZE	Milan Škoda
22	MF	CZE	Tomáš Souček
24	FW	BIH	Muris Mešanović
25	DF	CZE	Michal Frydrych
26	MF	SVK	Jakub Hromada
27	FW	CZE	Tomáš Necid (on loan from Bursaspor)
28	DF	CZE	Lukáš Pokorný
30	GK	CZE	Martin Otáhal
31	GK	CZE	Přemysl Kovář

=== Out on loan ===
Note: Flags indicate national team as defined under FIFA eligibility rules; some limited exceptions apply. Players may hold more than one non-FIFA nationality.

No.	Pos.	Nation	Player
—	GK	CZE	Martin Berkovec (at Karviná)
—	GK	SVK	Martin Vantruba (at (Slovakia) Spartak Trnava)
—	DF	CZE	Matěj Chaluš (at Mladá Boleslav)
—	MF	CRO	Marko Alvir (at (Slovenia) Domžale)

No.	Pos.	Nation	Player
—	MF	BIH	Jasmin Šćuk (at (Turkey) Erzurumspor)
—	MF	CZE	Daniel Trubač (at Teplice)
—	FW	CUW	Gino van Kessel (at (England) Oxford United)
—	FW	CZE	Zdeněk Linhart (at Táborsko)

== Transfers ==
=== In ===
Date	Position	Nationality	Name	From	Fee	Ref.
2 June 2017	DF	(Czech Republic)	Jakub Jugas	Fastav Zlín	Undisclosed	
20 June 2017	MF	(Slovakia)	Jakub Hromada	Sampdoria	Undisclosed	
22 June 2017	GK	(Czech Republic)	Jan Laštůvka	Karviná	Undisclosed	
28 June 2017	MF	(Portugal)	Danny	Zenit St.Petersburg	Free	
28 June 2017	MF	(Turkey)	Halil Altıntop	Augsburg	Free	
28 June 2017	MF	(Ukraine)	Ruslan Rotan	Dnipro Dnipropetrovsk	Free	
30 June 2017	GK	(Czech Republic)	Josef Rehak	MAS Táborsko	Loan Return	
30 June 2017	DF	(Czech Republic)	Libor Holík	Karviná	Loan Return	
30 June 2017	DF	(Czech Republic)	Jan Mikula	Slovan Liberec	Loan Return	
30 June 2017	FW	(Czech Republic)	Zdeněk Linhart	Příbram	Loan Return	
30 June 2017	MF	(Slovakia)	Jaroslav Mihalík	KS Cracovia	Loan Return	
30 June 2017	MF	(Czech Republic)	Josef Bazal	Příbram	Loan Return	
30 June 2017	FW	(Ghana)	Emmanuel Antwi	Sigma Olomouc	Loan Return	
30 June 2017	GK	(Czech Republic)	Martin Berkovec	Bohemians 1905	Loan Return	
30 June 2017	MF	(Netherlands)	Gino van Kessel	Lechia Gdańsk	Loan Return	
30 June 2017	MF	(Czech Republic)	Tomáš Souček	Slovan Liberec	Loan Return	
1 July 2017	MF	(Czech Republic)	Daniel Trubač	Hradec Králové	Undisclosed	
12 July 2017	FW	(Croatia)	Petar Musa	Inter Zaprešić	Undisclosed	
4 August 2017	DF	(Czech Republic)	Matěj Chaluš	Příbram	Undisclosed	
12 August 2017	MF	(Slovakia)	Miroslav Stoch	Fenerbahçe	Undisclosed	
5 January 2018	GK	(Slovakia)	Martin Vantruba	Spartak Trnava	Undisclosed	
13 January 2018	DF	(Czech Republic)	Lukáš Pokorný	Montpellier	€800,000	
20 January 2018	GK	(Czech Republic)	Ondřej Kolář	Slovan Liberec	Kč 25,000,000	
20 January 2018	DF	(Czech Republic)	Ondřej Kúdela	Slovan Liberec	Kč 10,000,000	

=== Loans in ===
Date from	Position	Nationality	Name	From	Date to	Ref.
9 August 2017	DF	(Ukraine)	Eduard Sobol	Shakhtar Donetsk	End of season	
1 September 2017	FW	(Czech Republic)	Tomáš Necid	Bursaspor	End of season	

=== Out ===
Date	Position	Nationality	Name	To	Fee	Ref.
1 July 2017	MF	(Czech Republic)	Antonín Barák	Udinese	Undisclosed	
1 July 2017	GK	(Czech Republic)	Jiří Pavlenka	Werder Bremen	Undisclosed	
1 July 2017	DF	(Czech Republic)	Michael Lüftner	Copenhagen	Undisclosed	
1 July 2017	MF	(Slovakia)	Jaroslav Mihalík	KS Cracovia	Undisclosed	
1 July 2017	DF	(Czech Republic)	Jan Mikula	Slovan Liberec	Undisclosed	
1 July 2017	MF	(Czech Republic)	Josef Bazal	Viktoria Žižkov	Undisclosed	
1 July 2017	FW	(Ghana)	Emmanuel Antwi	Slavia Prague U21		
28 July 2017	DF	(Czech Republic)	Marek Kodr	Příbram	Undisclosed	
12 January 2018	MF	(Ukraine)	Ruslan Rotan	Dynamo Kyiv	Undisclosed	
26 January 2018	GK	(Czech Republic)	Jan Laštůvka	Baník Ostrava	Undisclosed	
31 January 2018	MF	(Turkey)	Halil Altıntop	1. FC Kaiserslautern	Undisclosed	
15 February 2018	GK	(Czech Republic)	Josef Rehak	Vlašim	Undisclosed	

=== Loans out ===
Date from	Position	Nationality	Name	To	Date to	Ref.
1 July 2017	FW	(Czech Republic)	Zdeněk Linhart	Příbram	31 December 2017	
12 July 2017	GK	(Czech Republic)	Martin Berkovec	Karviná	End of season	
18 July 2017	GK	(Czech Republic)	Josef Rehak	Viktoria Žižkov	31 December 2017	
24 July 2017	MF	(Czech Republic)	Daniel Trubač	Teplice	End of season	
25 July 2017	FW	(Croatia)	Petar Musa	Viktoria Žižkov	End of season	
9 August 2017	FW	(Czech Republic)	Stanislav Tecl	Jablonec	22 January 2018	
10 August 2017	MF	(Netherlands)	Gino van Kessel	Oxford United	End of season	
10 September 2017	MF	(Turkmenistan)	Ruslan Mingazow	Mladá Boleslav	31 December 2017	
5 January 2018	GK	(Slovakia)	Martin Vantruba	Spartak Trnava	End of season	
22 February 2018	FW	(Czech Republic)	Zdeněk Linhart	Táborsko	End of season	
25 March 2018	MF	(Azerbaijan)	Farid Nabiyev	Shevardeni-1906	End of season	

=== Released ===
Date	Position	Nationality	Name	Joined	Date
1 January 2018	DF	(Czech Republic)	Jiří Bílek	Retired	
1 January 2018	DF	(Slovakia)	Dušan Švento		

== Pre-season and friendlies ==
Win Draw Loss

24 June 2017 Friendly	Slavia Prague	2–1	Viktoria Žižkov	Prague
10:00 CEST (UTC+02:00)	Rotan 27' (pen.) van Buren 75'	Report	Stratil 8'	Stadium: Eden Arena

28 June 2017 Friendly	Slavia Prague	0–0	České Budějovice	Prague
17:00 CEST (UTC+02:00)		Report		Stadium: Eden Arena; Attendance: 1,500

1 July 2017 Friendly	Slavia Prague (Czech Republic)	4–0	(Slovakia) Žilina	Prague
11:00 CEST (UTC+02:00)	Škoda 21' van Buren 41' (pen.); Rotan 67'; Trubač 84'	Report		Stadium: Eden Arena

4 July 2017 Friendly	Slavia Prague (Czech Republic)	0–0	(Scotland) Celtic	Prague
18:00 CEST (UTC+02:00)		Report		Stadium: Eden Arena; Attendance: 10,231

8 July 2017 Friendly	Slavia Prague (Czech Republic)	1–1	(Russia) Krasnodar	Prague
18:00 CEST (UTC+02:00)	Deli 90'	Report	Suleymanov 21'	Stadium: Eden Arena

12 July 2017 Friendly	Slavia Prague (Czech Republic)	2–1	(England) West Brom	Prague
17:00 CEST (UTC+02:00)	Deli 51'; Frydrych 77'	Report	McClean 26'	Stadium: Eden Arena

16 July 2017 Friendly	Slavia Prague (Czech Republic)	4–1	(France) Nice	Prague
19:00 CEST (UTC+02:00)	Škoda 47', 50' van Buren 69', 78'	Report	Boscagli 8'	Stadium: Eden Arena; Attendance: 12,138

== Competitions ==
=== Overall record ===
Competition	First match	Last match	Starting round	Final position	Record							
Competition	First match	Last match	Starting round	Final position	Pld	W	D	L	GF	GA	GD	Win %
Czech First League	29 July 2017	26 May 2018	Matchday 1	Runners-up	30	17	8	5	50	19	+31	56.67
Czech Cup	20 September 2017	9 May 2018	Third round	Winners	5	5	0	0	15	3	+12	100.00
UEFA Champions League	25 July 2017	23 August 2017	Third qualifying round	Play-off round	4	1	1	2	2	4	−2	25.00
UEFA Europa League	14 September 2017	7 December 2017	Group stage	Group stage	6	2	2	2	6	6	+0	33.33
Total					45	25	11	9	73	32	+41	55.56

Source: Soccerway

=== Czech First League ===
==== League table ====
Pos	Team	Pld	W	D	L	GF	GA	GD	Pts	Qualification or relegation
1	Viktoria Plzeň (C)	30	20	6	4	55	23	+32	66	Qualification for the Champions League group stage
2	Slavia Prague	30	17	8	5	50	19	+31	59	Qualification for the Champions League third qualifying round
3	Jablonec	30	16	8	6	49	27	+22	56	Qualification for the Europa League group stage (Note: Since the winners of the 2017–18 Czech Cup, Slavia Prague, qualified for European competition based on league position, the spot awarded to the cup winners was passed to the third-placed team, the spot awarded to the third-placed team was passed to the fourth-placed team, and the spot awarded to the fourth-placed team was passed to the fifth-placed team.)
4	Sigma Olomouc	30	15	10	5	41	22	+19	55	Qualification for the Europa League third qualifying round
5	Sparta Prague	30	14	11	5	43	25	+18	53	Qualification for the Europa League second qualifying round

Source: Fortuna liga, Soccerway
Rules for classification: 1) Points; 2) Head-to-head points; 3) Head-to-head goal difference; 4) Head-to-head goals scored; 5) Goal difference; 6) Goals scored; 7) Play-off (only if deciding champion, UEFA competitions, or relegation); 8) Draw.
(C) Champions

==== Results summary ====
Overall								Home						Away					
Pld	W	D	L	GF	GA	GD	Pts	W	D	L	GF	GA	GD	W	D	L	GF	GA	GD
30	17	8	5	50	19	+31	59	11	1	3	30	11	+19	6	7	2	20	8	+12

Source: See results

==== Results by round ====
Round	1	2	3	4	5	6	7	8	9	10	11	12	13	14	15	16	17	18	19	20	21	22	23	24	25	26	27	28	29	30
Ground	H	A	H	A	H	A	H	A	H	A	H	A	A	H	A	H	A	H	A	H	A	H	A	H	A	H	H	A	H	A
Result	W	D	W	D	W	D	W	D	W	W	L	W	L	W	D	W	L	W	W	W	D	L	W	W	D	D	W	W	L	W
Position	6	6	2	3	2	2	2	3	3	2	2	2	3	3	3	2	3	2	2	2	2	2	2	2	2	2	2	2	2	2

Source: See results
A = Away; H = Home; W = Win; D = Draw; L = Loss

==== Matches ====
29 July 2017 1	Slavia Prague	1–0	Teplice	Prague
20:00 CEST (UTC+2)	Altıntop 9'; Šćuk (yellow card) 52'; Bílek (yellow card) 73'	Report	Vondrášek (yellow card) 8'; Rezek (yellow card) 49'; Červenka (yellow card) 76'; Jeřábek (yellow card) 77'	Stadium: Eden Arena; Attendance: 11,097; Referee: Pavel Orel

6 August 2017 2	Baník Ostrava	0–0	Slavia Prague	Ostrava
18:00 CEST (UTC+2)	Hlinka (yellow card) 15'; Sus (yellow card) 44'	Report	Danny (yellow card) 2'; Frydrych (yellow card) 26'; Škoda (yellow card) 77'	Stadium: Bazaly; Attendance: 13,056; Referee: Radek Příhoda

11 August 2017 3	Slavia Prague	2–0	Vysočina Jihlava	Prague
18:00 CEST (UTC+2)	Hušbauer 6' (yellow card) 39'; Danny 18'	Report	Zoubele (yellow card) 5'; Keresteš (yellow card) 38'; Dvořák (yellow card) 74'; Nový (yellow card) 80'	Stadium: Eden Arena; Attendance: 10,112; Referee: Martin Nenadál

19 August 2017 4	Bohemians 1905	0–0	Slavia Prague	Prague
18:00 CEST (UTC+2)	Jindřišek (yellow card) 87'	Report	Souček (yellow card) 74'	Stadium: Ďolíček; Attendance: 4,812; Referee: Zbyněk Proske

27 August 2017 5	Slavia Prague	4–0	Mladá Boleslav	Prague
16:30 CEST (UTC+2)	van Buren 14', 40'; Jugas (yellow card) 51'; Stronati 76' (o.g.); Sobol 82'	Report	Mareš (yellow card) 18' da Silva (yellow card) 74'	Stadium: Eden Arena; Attendance: 10,911; Referee: Pavel Franěk

9 September 2017 6	Sigma Olomouc	1–1	Slavia Prague	Olomouc
18:00 CEST (UTC+2)	Jemelka 40'; Falta (yellow card) 54'; Manzia (yellow card) 79'; Zahradníček (yellow card) 90'	Report	Škoda 9'; Hušbauer (yellow card) 35'; Jugas (yellow card) 39'; Ngadeu-Ngadjui (yellow card) 71'; Bořil (yellow card) 89'; Necid (yellow card) 90'	Stadium: Andrův stadion Attendance: 9,171; Referee: Pavel Královec

17 September 2017 7	Slavia Prague	2–0	Sparta Prague	Prague
18:00 CEST (UTC+2)	Bořil (yellow card) 9'; Ngadeu-Ngadjui (yellow card) 42'; Škoda 71'; Hušbauer 90'	Report	Mareček (yellow card) 40'; Mandjeck (yellow card) 53'; Nhamoinesu (yellow card) 87' (yellow-red card) 89'	Stadium: Eden Arena; Attendance: 19,084; Referee: Jan Jílek

23 September 2017 8	Fastav Zlín	1–1	Slavia Prague	Zlín
17:00 CEST (UTC+2)	Traoré (yellow card) 41'; Vukadinović 84' (pen.)	Report	Frydrych (yellow card) 62'; Škoda 76'; Jugas (yellow card) 83'	Stadium: Letná Stadion; Attendance: 5,564; Referee: Pavel Královec

30 September 2017 9	Slavia Prague	2–0	Zbrojovka Brno	Prague
18:00 CEST (UTC+2)	Necid 43', 75'; Hušbauer (yellow card) 45'	Report	Gáč (yellow card) 42'	Stadium: Eden Arena; Attendance: 11,467; Referee: Martin Nenadá

14 October 2017 10	Karviná	0–2	Slavia Prague	Karviná
20:00 CEST (UTC+2)	Janečka (yellow card) 28'	Report	Škoda 17'; Bořil (yellow card) 28'; Rotan (yellow card) 41' van Buren 57'	Stadium: Městský stadion Attendance: 4,586; Referee: Miroslav Zelinka

21 October 2017 11	Slavia Prague	1–2	Slovan Liberec	Prague
18:00 CEST (UTC+2)	Sýkora (yellow card) 41'; Laštůvka (yellow card) 74'; Necid 90'	Report	Potočný 35'; Kulhánek (yellow card) 62'; Potočný (yellow card) 67'; Bosančić 73' (pen.); Bosančić (yellow card) 74'; Pulkrab (yellow card) 83'	Stadium: Eden Arena; Attendance: 14,067; Referee: Ondřej Pechanec

28 October 2017 12	Slovácko	0–3	Slavia Prague	Uherské Hradiště
18:00 CEST (UTC+2)	Šimko (yellow card) 14'	Report	Souček 14'; Škoda 32' (pen.); Sobol (yellow card) 37' van Buren 46'; Hromada (yellow card) 81'	Stadium: Městský fotbalový stadion Miroslava Valenty; Attendance: 4,365; Referee: Pavel Julínek

4 November 2017 13	Viktoria Plzeň	1–0	Slavia Prague	Plzeň
18:00 CET (UTC+1)	Hájek (yellow card) 30'; Kolář 79'	Report	Bořil (yellow card) 45' van Buren (yellow card) 51'	Stadium: Doosan Arena; Attendance: 11,640; Referee: Radek Příhoda

18 November 2017 14	Slavia Prague	5–0	Dukla Prague	Prague
18:00 CET (UTC+1)	Škoda 9', 32'; Zmrhal 55', 65'; Stoch (yellow card) 79'; Souček 82'	Report	Tetour (yellow card) 75'; Rada (yellow card) 79'	Stadium: Eden Arena; Attendance: 10,505; Referee: Pavel Královec

25 November 2017 15	Jablonec	1–1	Slavia Prague	Jablonec nad Nisou
17:30 CET (UTC+1)	Mihálik 64'; Zelený (yellow card) 70'; Masopust (yellow card) 76'; Kubista (yellow card) 87'	Report	Zmrhal 33'; Ngadeu-Ngadjui (yellow card) 71'	Stadium: Stadion Střelnice; Attendance: 3,038; Referee: Emanuel Marek

2 December 2017 16	Slavia Prague	2–1	Baník Ostrava	Prague
19:30 CET (UTC+1)	Škoda 25'; Frydrych 28'; Danny (yellow card) 83'; Laštůvka (yellow card) 90'	Report	Frydrych 10' (o.g.); Baroš (yellow card) 83'	Stadium: Eden Arena; Attendance: 11,087; Referee: Jan Jílek

17 December 2017 17	Vysočina Jihlava	1–0	Slavia Prague	Jihlava
16:30 CET (UTC+1)	Dvořák 10'; Schumacher (yellow card) 45'; Ikaunieks (yellow card) 56'	Report	Sýkora (yellow card) 49'; Kolář (yellow card) 63'; Deli (yellow card) 90'; Danny (yellow card) 90'	Stadium: Stadion v Jiráskově ulici Attendance: 3,789; Referee: Ondrej Pechanec

24 February 2018 18	Slavia Prague	1–0	Bohemians 1905	Prague
18:00 CET (UTC+1)	Jugas (yellow card) 27'; Hromada (yellow card) 44'; Hušbauer 46' (yellow card) 50'; Sýkora (yellow card) 73'	Report	Mašek (yellow card) 18'	Stadium: Eden Arena; Attendance: 9,648; Referee: Zbyněk Proske

3 March 2018 19	Mladá Boleslav	0–3	Slavia Prague	Mladá Boleslav
18:00 CET (UTC+1)	Valenta (yellow card) 46'	Report	Bořil (yellow card) 24'; Zmrhal 40'; Pokorný (yellow card) 48'; Škoda 66' (pen.); Křapka 73' (o.g.)	Stadium: Městský stadion Attendance: 3,202; Referee: Petr Ardeleánu

10 March 2018 20	Slavia Prague	3–1	Sigma Olomouc	Prague
15:00 CET (UTC+1)	Stoch (yellow card) 62'; Souček (yellow card) 66'; Škoda 74'; Tecl (yellow card) 77' (goal) 81' van Buren 84'	Report	Sladký (yellow card) 19'; Hála (yellow card) 30' (goal) 57'; Plšek (yellow card) 73'	Stadium: Eden Arena; Attendance: 14,117; Referee: Pavel Orel

17 March 2018 21	Sparta Prague	3–3	Slavia Prague	Prague
17:30 CET (UTC+1)	Stanciu 12', 44'; Souček 31' (o.g.); Lafata (yellow card) 55'; V.Kadlec (yellow card) 58'; Plavšić (yellow card) 69'; Šural (yellow card) 84'; Štetina (yellow card) 90'	Report	Danny (yellow card) 35'; Hromada (yellow card) 48'; Deli (yellow card) 69' (goal) 83'; Stoch 70'; Bořil (yellow card) 77'; Škoda 90' (pen.)	Stadium: Generali Arena; Attendance: 17,034; Referee: Pavel Královec

31 March 2018 22	Slavia Prague	1–2	Fastav Zlín	Prague
18:00 CEST (UTC+2)	Škoda 28'	Report	Holzer 7'; Ekpai (yellow card) 25' (goal) 90'; Matejov (yellow card) 35'; Bartošák (yellow card) 64'; Hnaníček (yellow card) 78'; Zlámal (yellow card) 90'; Džafič (yellow card) 90'	Stadium: Eden Arena; Attendance: 13,477; Referee: Karel Hrubeš

7 April 2018 23	Zbrojovka Brno	0–1	Slavia Prague	Brno
13:00 CEST (UTC+2)	Lutonský (yellow card) 18'; Juhar (yellow card) 43'; Škoda (yellow card) 88'	Report	Ngadeu-Ngadjui (yellow card) 44'; Sobol (yellow card) 57'; Tecl 71'; Frydrych (yellow card) 85'	Stadium: Městský fotbalový stadion Srbská; Attendance: 5,546; Referee: Zbynek Proske

13 April 2018 24	Slavia Prague	3–2	Karviná	Prague
18:00 CEST (UTC+2)	Stoch 29', 59'; Frydrych (yellow card) 64'; Jugas 78'; Sobol (yellow card) 80'	Report	Kalabiška 14'; Wágner 87'	Stadium: Eden Arena; Attendance: 9,623; Referee: Miroslav Zelinka

22 April 2018 25	Slovan Liberec	0–0	Slavia Prague	Liberec
18:00 CEST (UTC+2)	Coufal (yellow card) 27'; Folprecht (yellow card) 39'; Pulkrab (yellow card) 57' (yellow-red card) 77'; Hladký (yellow card) 69'	Report	Tecl (yellow card) 27'; Ngadeu-Ngadjui (yellow card) 34'; Sýkora (yellow card) 42'; Danny (yellow card) 63'; Hromada (yellow card) 74'; Kúdela (yellow card) 86'; Souček (yellow card) 88'; Bořil (yellow card) 90'	Stadium: Stadion u Nisy; Attendance: 9,290; Referee: Radek Příhoda

29 April 2018 26	Slavia Prague	0–0	Slovácko	Prague
15:00 CEST (UTC+2)	Danny (yellow card) 45'; Souček (yellow card) 47'	Report	Divíšek (yellow card) 24'; Navrátil (yellow card) 54'; Daníček (yellow card) 86'	Stadium: Eden Arena; Attendance: 13,118; Referee: Pavel Julínek

5 May 2018 27	Slavia Prague	2–0	Viktoria Plzeň	Prague
18:30 CEST (UTC+2)	Řezník 16' (o.g.); Frydrych (yellow card) 54'; Tecl 58'; Hušbauer (yellow card) 66'; Sýkora (yellow card) 70'	Report	Bakoš (yellow card) 9'; Hubník (yellow card) 36'; Havel (yellow card) 52'; Hořava (yellow card) 53'; Limberský (yellow card) 59'	Stadium: Eden Arena; Attendance: 15,674; Referee: Pavel Franek

14 May 2018 28	Dukla Prague	0–2	Slavia Prague	Prague
19:00 CEST (UTC+2)	Albiach (yellow card) 57'; Kušnír (yellow card) 67'	Report	Sýkora 10'; Hušbauer (yellow card) 76'; Souček (yellow card) 82'; Stoch 90+4'	Stadium: Stadion Juliska; Attendance: 7,324; Referee: Petr Ardeleánu

19 May 2018 29	Slavia Prague	1–3	Jablonec	Prague
16:00 CEST (UTC+2)	Sýkora 83' (yellow card) 87'; Hromada (yellow card) 90'	Report	Považanec 13'; Chramosta 19'; Trávník 31'; Zelený (yellow card) 48'	Stadium: Eden Arena; Attendance: 12,473; Referee: Pavel Královec

26 May 2018 30	Teplice	0–3	Slavia Prague	Teplice
16:00 CEST (UTC+2)	Ljevaković (yellow card) 54'	Report	Škoda (yellow card) 30'; Ngadeu-Ngadjui 41'; Souček 51'; Zmrhal 68'	Stadium: Na Stínadlech; Attendance: 6,805; Referee: Karel Hrubeš

=== Czech Cup ===
20 September 2017 Third round	Slavia Prague	5–1	Třinec	Prague
17:00 CEST (UTC+02:00)	Altıntop 49'; Frydrych 53'; Sýkora 60'; Necid 70', 90'	Report	J.Kateřiňák (yellow card) 15'; Hošek 45'; I.Bedecs (yellow card) 83'	Stadium: Eden Arena; Attendance: 3,968; Referee: Ondřej Ginzel

25 October 2017 Fourth round	Jihlava	1–3	Slavia Prague	Jihlava
18:00 CEST (UTC+02:00)	M.Nový 21'; J.Záviška (yellow card) 70'	Report	Frydrych 52'; Necid 56'; Flo 59'; Bílek (yellow card) 71'	Stadium: Stadion v Jiráskově ulici Attendance: 2,348; Referee: Jiří Houdek

7 March 2018 Quarter-finals	Slavia Prague	2–0	Slovan Liberec	Prague
17:00 CEST (UTC+02:00)	Škoda 25' (pen.); Frydrych 35' (yellow card) 90+3'; Jugas (yellow card) 69'; Bílek (yellow card) 73'; Necid (yellow card) 88'	Report	Kacharaba (yellow card) 24'; Breite (yellow card) 35'; Pulkrab (yellow card) 55'; Karafiát (yellow card) 68'	Stadium: Eden Arena; Attendance: 4,997; Referee: Ondej Berka

17 April 2018 Semi-finals	Slavia Prague	2–0	Mladá Boleslav	Prague
20:00 CEST (UTC+02:00)	Hušbauer 48'; Stoch 56'; Ngadeu-Ngadjui (yellow card) 66'	Report	Matějovský (yellow card) 87'	Stadium: Eden Arena; Attendance: 7,326; Referee: Emanuel Marek

9 May 2018 Final	Slavia Prague	3–1	Jablonec	Mladá Boleslav
20:15 CEST (UTC+02:00)	Tecl 14', 39'; Frydrych (yellow card) 48'; Ngadeu-Ngadjui (yellow card) 71'; Stoch 89'; Bořil (yellow card) 90+2'; Sýkora (yellow card) 90+7'	Report	Pernica 34'; Jovović (yellow card) 90+7'	Stadium: Městský stadion Attendance: 4,625; Referee: Miroslav Zelinka

=== UEFA Champions League ===
==== Qualifying rounds ====
===== Third qualifying round =====
25 July 2017 First leg	Slavia Prague (Czech Republic)	1–0	(Belarus) BATE Borisov	Prague, Czech Republic
19:00 CEST (UTC+02:00)	Jugas (yellow card) 15'; Škoda 20' (pen.); Frydrych (yellow card) 62'	Report	Yablonskiy (red card) 19'; Signevich (yellow card) 56'; Scherbitskiy (yellow card) 61'; Buljat (yellow card) 79'; Kendysh (yellow card) 87'	Stadium: Eden Arena; Attendance: 18,147; Referee: Bastian Dankert (Germany)

2 August 2017 Second leg	BATE Borisov (Belarus)	2–1 (2–2 (a) agg.)	(Czech Republic) Slavia Prague	Barysaw, Belarus
18:00 CEST (UTC+02:00)	Signevich 5'; Stasevich 46' (yellow card) 90+3'; Milunović (yellow card) 82'	Report	Škoda 44'	Stadium: Borisov Arena; Attendance: 12,436; Referee: Pol van Boekel (Netherlands)

===== Play-off round =====
15 August 2017 First leg	APOEL (Cyprus)	2–0	(Czech Republic) Slavia Prague	Nicosia, Cyprus
19:45 CEST (UTC+02:00)	de Camargo 2' (yellow card) 53'; Aloneftis 10'; Carlão (yellow card) 77'	Report	Rotan (yellow card) 6'	Stadium: GSP Stadium; Attendance: 13,073; Referee: Antonio Mateu Lahoz (Spain)

23 August 2017 Second leg	Slavia Prague (Czech Republic)	0–0 (0–2 agg.)	(Cyprus) APOEL	Prague, Czech Republic
20:45 CEST (UTC+02:00)	Hušbauer (yellow card) 19'; Mešanović (yellow card) 61'; Souček (yellow card) 80'	Report	Vinícius (yellow card) 21' de Camargo (yellow card) 39'	Stadium: Eden Arena; Attendance: 18,844; Referee: Milorad Mažić (Serbia)

=== UEFA Europa League ===
==== Group stage ====
Pos	Team	Pld	W	D	L	GF	GA	GD	Pts	Qualification	VIL	AST	SLP	MTA
1	(Spain) Villarreal	6	3	2	1	10	6	+4	11	Advance to knockout phase	—	3–1	2–2	0–1
2	(Kazakhstan) Astana	6	3	1	2	10	7	+3	10	Advance to knockout phase	2–3	—	1–1	4–0
3	(Czech Republic) Slavia Prague	6	2	2	2	6	6	0	8		0–2	0–1	—	1–0
4	(Israel) Maccabi Tel Aviv	6	1	1	4	1	8	−7	4		0–0	0–1	0–2	—

Source: UEFA

14 September 2017 1	Slavia Prague (Czech Republic)	1–0	(Israel) Maccabi Tel Aviv	Prague, Czech Republic
19:00 CEST (UTC+02:00)	Necid 12'; Stoch (yellow card) 54'	Report	Babin (yellow card) 30'; Yeini (yellow card) 90+3'	Stadium: Eden Arena; Attendance: 13,035; Referee: Robert Schörgenhofer (Austria)

28 September 2017 2	Astana (Kazakhstan)	1–1	(Czech Republic) Slavia Prague	Astana, Kazakhstan
17:00 CEST (UTC+02:00) 21:00 (UTC+6)	Muzhikov (yellow card) 27'; Tomasov 42'; Postnikov (yellow card) 85'	Report	Ngadeu-Ngadjui 18'; Jugas (yellow card) 32'; Bořil (yellow card) 39'; Sobol (yellow card) 63'	Stadium: Astana Arena; Attendance: 17,215; Referee: Andreas Ekberg (Sweden)

19 October 2017 3	Villarreal (Spain)	2–2	(Czech Republic) Slavia Prague	Villarreal, Spain
21:05 CEST (UTC+02:00)	Bruno (yellow card) 31'; Trigueros 41'; Bacca 44'; Guerra (yellow card) 83'; Costa (yellow card) 90+1'	Report	Necid 18'; Danny 30'; Bořil (yellow card) 90+2'	Stadium: Estadio de la Cerámica; Attendance: 15,634; Referee: Svein Oddvar Moen (Norway)

2 November 2017 4	Slavia Prague (Czech Republic)	0–2	(Spain) Villarreal	Prague, Czech Republic
19:00 CET (UTC+01:00)	Bořil (yellow card) 88'	Report	Bacca 15'; Bakambu (yellow card) 58'; Deli 89' (o.g.)	Stadium: Eden Arena; Attendance: 18,403; Referee: Bobby Madden (Scotland)

23 November 2017 5	Maccabi Tel Aviv (Israel)	0–2	(Czech Republic) Slavia Prague	Netanya, Israel
20:05 CET (UTC+01:00)	Rikan (yellow card) 9'; Davidzada (yellow card) 38'; Kjartansson (yellow card) 40'; Peretz (yellow card) 72'	Report	Souček (yellow card) 42'; Hušbauer 45+1', 54' van Buren (yellow card) 82'	Stadium: Netanya Stadium; Attendance: 6,874; Referee: István Kovács (Romania)
Note: Maccabi Tel Aviv was play their home matches at Netanya Stadium, Netanya, instead of their regular stadium Bloomfield Stadium, Tel Aviv, due to renovation.

7 December 2017 6	Slavia Prague (Czech Republic)	0–1	(Kazakhstan) Astana	Prague, Czech Republic
18:00 CET (UTC+01:00)	Sobol (yellow card) 42'; Stoch (yellow card) 88'; Necid (yellow card) 90+5'	Report	Aničić 39'; Muzhikov (yellow card) 53'; Erić (yellow card) 78'; Shitov (yellow card) 83'	Stadium: Eden Arena; Attendance: 14,198; Referee: Davide Massa (Italy)

== Squad statistics ==
As of match played 26 May 2018

=== Appearances and goals ===
No.	Pos	Nat	Player	Total		HET liga		MOL Cup		Champions League		Europa League	
No.	Pos	Nat	Player	Apps	Goals	Apps	Goals	Apps	Goals	Apps	Goals	Apps	Goals
1	GK	(Czech Republic) CZE	Ondřej Kolář	17	0	14	0	3	0	0	0	0	0
3	DF	(Ukraine) UKR	Eduard Sobol	28	1	17+3	1	1+1	0	0	0	6	0
4	DF	(Czech Republic) CZE	Jakub Jugas	43	1	29	1	4	0	4	0	6	0
5	DF	(Norway) NOR	Per-Egil Flo	5	1	2	0	3	1	0	0	0	0
6	MF	(Czech Republic) CZE	Jan Sýkora	27	3	11+6	2	3	1	0+2	0	4+1	0
7	MF	(Portugal) POR	Danny	32	2	12+9	1	1+3	0	3	0	3+1	1
8	MF	(Czech Republic) CZE	Jaromír Zmrhal	32	5	16+5	5	3	0	0+3	0	5	0
9	MF	(Turkmenistan) TKM	Ruslan Mingazow	4	0	3	0	0	0	0+1	0	0	0
10	MF	(Czech Republic) CZE	Josef Hušbauer	38	6	26+3	3	3	1	4	0	1+1	2
11	FW	(Czech Republic) CZE	Stanislav Tecl	11	5	4+5	3	1+1	2	0	0	0	0
12	MF	(Czech Republic) CZE	Pavel Bucha	5	0	2+3	0	0	0	0	0	0	0
13	DF	(Cameroon) CMR	Michael Ngadeu-Ngadjui	32	2	18+3	1	2	0	4	0	3+2	1
14	FW	(Netherlands) NED	Mick van Buren	28	5	9+7	5	0+2	0	4	0	0+6	0
15	DF	(Czech Republic) CZE	Ondřej Kúdela	8	0	5+2	0	0+1	0	0	0	0	0
17	MF	(Slovakia) SVK	Miroslav Stoch	41	6	22+6	4	4+1	2	2	0	5+1	0
18	DF	(Czech Republic) CZE	Jan Bořil	38	0	27	0	4	0	4	0	2+1	0
19	DF	(Ivory Coast) CIV	Simon Deli	18	1	10	1	0+1	0	2	0	5	0
21	FW	(Czech Republic) CZE	Milan Škoda	38	15	21+7	12	1+2	1	3	2	1+3	0
22	MF	(Czech Republic) CZE	Tomáš Souček	40	3	25+3	3	4	0	2+1	0	5	0
24	FW	(Bosnia and Herzegovina) BIH	Muris Mešanović	7	0	3	0	1	0	0+3	0	0	0
25	DF	(Czech Republic) CZE	Michal Frydrych	33	4	19+2	1	4	3	4	0	4	0
26	MF	(Slovakia) SVK	Jakub Hromada	22	0	8+6	0	4	0	0	0	3+1	0
27	FW	(Czech Republic) CZE	Tomáš Necid	25	8	2+13	3	3+1	3	0	0	5+1	2
28	DF	(Czech Republic) CZE	Lukáš Pokorný	4	0	3	0	1	0	0	0	0	0
31	GK	(Czech Republic) CZE	Přemysl Kovář	6	0	1+1	0	2	0	0	0	2	0
Players away from Slavia Prague on loan:
23	MF	(Bosnia and Herzegovina) BIH	Jasmin Šćuk	1	0	1	0	0	0	0	0	0	0
Players who left Slavia Prague during the season:
5	MF	(Turkey) TUR	Halil Altıntop	10	2	5+3	1	0+2	1	0	0	0	0
16	GK	(Czech Republic) CZE	Jan Laštůvka	23	0	15	0	0	0	4	0	4	0
20	DF	(Czech Republic) CZE	Jiří Bílek	3	0	1	0	2	0	0	0	0	0
29	MF	(Ukraine) UKR	Ruslan Rotan	14	0	7	0	1	0	4	0	2	0
81	MF	(Slovakia) SVK	Dušan Švento	3	0	0+2	0	0	0	0+1	0	0	0

=== Goal scorers ===
Place	Position	Nation	Number	Name	HET liga	MOL Cup	Champions League	Europa League	Total
1	FW	(Czech Republic)	21	Milan Škoda	12	1	2	0	15
2	FW	(Czech Republic)	27	Tomáš Necid	3	3	0	2	8
3	MF	(Slovakia)	17	Miroslav Stoch	4	2	0	0	6
3	MF	(Czech Republic)	10	Josef Hušbauer	3	1	0	2	6
5	FW	(Netherlands)	26	Mick van Buren	5	0	0	0	5
5	MF	(Czech Republic)	8	Jaromír Zmrhal	5	0	0	0	5
5	FW	(Czech Republic)	11	Stanislav Tecl	3	2	0	0	5
8	DF	(Czech Republic)	25	Michal Frydrych	1	3	0	0	4
9	MF	(Czech Republic)	22	Tomáš Souček	3	0	0	0	3
9	MF	(Czech Republic)	6	Jan Sýkora	2	1	0	0	3
9				Own goal	3	0	0	0	3
12	MF	(Turkey)	5	Halil Altıntop	1	1	0	0	2
12	FW	(Portugal)	7	Danny	1	0	0	1	2
12	MF	(Cameroon)	13	Michael Ngadeu-Ngadjui	1	0	0	1	2
15	DF	(Ukraine)	3	Eduard Sobol	1	0	0	0	1
15	DF	(Ivory Coast)	19	Simon Deli	1	0	0	0	1
15	DF	(Czech Republic)	4	Jakub Jugas	1	0	0	0	1
15	DF	(Norway)	15	Per-Egil Flo	0	1	0	0	1
				TOTALS	50	15	2	6	73

=== Disciplinary record ===
Number	Nation	Position	Name	HET liga		MOL Cup		Champions League		Europa League		Total	
Number	Nation	Position	Name	Yellow card	Red card	Yellow card	Red card	Yellow card	Red card	Yellow card	Red card	Yellow card	Red card
1	(Czech Republic)	GK	Ondřej Kolář	1	0	0	0	0	0	0	0	1	0
3	(Ukraine)	DF	Eduard Sobol	3	0	0	0	0	0	2	0	5	0
4	(Czech Republic)	DF	Jakub Jugas	4	0	1	0	1	0	1	0	7	0
6	(Czech Republic)	MF	Jan Sýkora	6	0	1	0	0	0	0	0	7	0
7	(Portugal)	MF	Danny	6	0	0	0	0	0	0	0	6	0
10	(Czech Republic)	MF	Josef Hušbauer	6	0	0	0	1	0	0	0	7	0
11	(Czech Republic)	FW	Stanislav Tecl	2	0	0	0	0	0	0	0	2	0
13	(Cameroon)	MF	Michael Ngadeu-Ngadjui	5	0	2	0	0	0	0	0	7	0
14	(Netherlands)	FW	Mick van Buren	1	0	0	0	0	0	1	0	2	0
15	(Czech Republic)	DF	Ondřej Kúdela	1	0	0	0	0	0	0	0	1	0
17	(Slovakia)	MF	Miroslav Stoch	2	0	0	0	0	0	2	0	4	0
18	(Czech Republic)	DF	Jan Bořil	7	0	1	0	0	0	3	0	11	0
19	(Ivory Coast)	DF	Simon Deli	2	0	0	0	0	0	0	0	2	0
20	(Czech Republic)	DF	Jiří Bílek	1	0	1	0	0	0	0	0	2	0
21	(Czech Republic)	FW	Milan Škoda	2	0	0	0	0	0	0	0	2	0
22	(Czech Republic)	MF	Tomáš Souček	5	0	0	0	1	0	1	0	7	0
24	(Bosnia and Herzegovina)	FW	Muris Mešanović	0	0	0	0	1	0	0	0	1	0
25	(Czech Republic)	DF	Michal Frydrych	5	0	2	0	1	0	0	0	8	0
26	(Czech Republic)	MF	Jakub Hromada	5	0	0	0	0	0	0	0	5	0
27	(Czech Republic)	FW	Tomáš Necid	1	0	1	0	0	0	1	0	3	0
28	(Czech Republic)	DF	Lukáš Pokorný	1	0	0	0	0	0	0	0	1	0
Players away on loan:
23	(Bosnia and Herzegovina)	MF	Jasmin Šćuk	1	0	0	0	0	0	0	0	1	0
Players who left Slavia Prague during the season:
16	(Czech Republic)	GK	Jan Laštůvka	2	0	0	0	0	0	0	0	2	0
22	(Ukraine)	MF	Ruslan Rotan	1	0	0	0	1	0	0	0	2	0
			TOTALS	70	0	9	0	6	0	11	0	96	0
