= 2018–19 SK Slavia Prague season =

Slavia Prague
2018–19 season
- President: Jaroslav Tvrdík
- Head coach: Jindřich Trpišovský
- Stadium: Eden Arena
- Czech First League: 1st
- Czech Cup: Winners
- Champions League: Third qualifiying round
- Europa League: Quarter-finals
- Top goalscorer: League: Tomáš Souček (13); All: Tomáš Souček (18)
Home colours	Away colours

The 2018–19 season was SK Slavia Prague's 26th season in the Czech First League. The team competed in Czech First League, the Czech Cup, the UEFA Champions League and the UEFA Europa League.

== Season events ==
On 27 April, Slavia gathered three points against Olomouc (match-week 30), which was sufficient to be mathematically assured that the team will finish ahead of Sparta in the league table.

== Squad ==
As of 17 January 2019

Note: Flags indicate national team as defined under FIFA eligibility rules; some limited exceptions apply. Players may hold more than one non-FIFA nationality.

No.	Pos.	Nation	Player
1	GK	CZE	Ondřej Kolář
5	DF	CZE	Vladimír Coufal
8	MF	CZE	Jaromír Zmrhal
9	MF	NGR	Peter Olayinka
10	MF	CZE	Josef Hušbauer
11	FW	CZE	Stanislav Tecl
12	DF	CZE	Jaroslav Zelený
13	DF	CMR	Michael Ngadeu-Ngadjui
14	FW	NED	Mick van Buren
15	DF	CZE	Ondřej Kúdela
17	MF	SVK	Miroslav Stoch
18	DF	CZE	Jan Bořil
19	DF	CIV	Simon Deli

No.	Pos.	Nation	Player
20	MF	ROU	Alexandru Băluță
21	FW	CZE	Milan Škoda
22	MF	CZE	Tomáš Souček
23	MF	CZE	Petr Ševčík
25	DF	CZE	Michal Frydrych
26	MF	SVK	Jakub Hromada
27	MF	CIV	Ibrahim Traoré
28	MF	CZE	Lukáš Masopust
29	DF	CZE	Tomáš Vlček
30	GK	SVK	Martin Kuciak (loan from Železiarne Podbrezová)
31	GK	CZE	Přemysl Kovář
33	MF	CZE	Alex Král

=== Out on loan ===
Note: Flags indicate national team as defined under FIFA eligibility rules; some limited exceptions apply. Players may hold more than one non-FIFA nationality.

No.	Pos.	Nation	Player
4	DF	CZE	Jakub Jugas (at Mladá Boleslav)
6	MF	CZE	Jan Sýkora (at Slovan Liberec)
16	MF	CZE	Jan Matoušek (at 1. FK Příbram)
28	DF	CZE	Lukáš Pokorný (at Bohemians 1905)
29	MF	CZE	Matěj Valenta (at Ústí nad Labem)
30	GK	SVK	Martin Vantruba (at Železiarne Podbrezová)
—	GK	CZE	Martin Berkovec (at MFK Karviná)
—	GK	CZE	Martin Otáhal (at Žižkov)

No.	Pos.	Nation	Player
—	DF	CZE	Matěj Chaluš (at Mladá Boleslav)
—	MF	CZE	Daniel Trubač (at Teplice)
—	MF	CZE	Tomáš Freit (at Opava)
—	MF	TKM	Ruslan Mingazow (at 1. FK Příbram)
—	FW	BHR	Abdulla Helal (at Bohemians 1905)
—	FW	CZE	Jan Kuchta (at FK Teplice)
—	FW	CRO	Petar Musa (at Žižkov)

=== Unregistered ===
Note: Flags indicate national team as defined under FIFA eligibility rules; some limited exceptions apply. Players may hold more than one non-FIFA nationality.

No. / Pos. / Nation / Player; — / MF / CRO / Marko Alvir	No. / Pos. / Nation / Player; — / MF / AUT / Jonas Auer

== Transfers ==
=== In ===
Date	Position	Nationality	Name	From	Fee	Ref.
5 June 2018	DF	(Czech Republic)	Vladimír Coufal	Slovan Liberec	Undisclosed	
22 June 2018	FW	(Romania)	Alexandru Băluță	Universitatea Craiova	Undisclosed	
22 June 2018	MF	(Czech Republic)	Jaroslav Zelený	Jablonec	Undisclosed	
21 July 2018	FW	(Nigeria)	Peter Olayinka	KAA Gent	€3,200,000	
3 September 2018	MF	(Czech Republic)	Jan Matoušek	Příbram	Undisclosed	
18 December 2018	MF	(Czech Republic)	Lukáš Masopust	Jablonec	Undisclosed	
18 December 2018	MF	(Czech Republic)	Petr Ševčík	Slovan Liberec	Undisclosed	
2 January 2019	MF	(Czech Republic)	Alex Král	FK Teplice	Undisclosed	
4 January 2019	FW	(Bahrain)	Abdulla Helal	Bohemians 1905	Undisclosed	
6 January 2019	MF	(Ivory Coast)	Ibrahim Traoré	Fastav Zlín	Undisclosed	

=== Loans in ===
Date from	Position	Nationality	Name	From	Date to	Ref.
3 September 2018	MF	(Ivory Coast)	Ibrahim Traoré	Fastav Zlín	31 December 2018	
16 January 2019	GK	(Slovakia)	Martin Kuciak	Železiarne Podbrezová	End of Season	

=== Out ===
Date	Position	Nationality	Name	To	Fee	Ref.
17 July 2018	DF	(Norway)	Per-Egil Flo	Lausanne-Sport	Undisclosed	
9 August 2018	FW	(Curaçao)	Gino van Kessel	Roeselare	Undisclosed	
	MF	(Bosnia and Herzegovina)	Jasmin Šćuk	BB Erzurumspor	Undisclosed	
22 February 2019	FW	(Bosnia and Herzegovina)	Muris Mešanović	Mladá Boleslav	Undisclosed	

=== Loans out ===
Date from	Position	Nationality	Name	To	Date to	Ref.
1 July 2018	DF	(Czech Republic)	Matěj Chaluš	Mladá Boleslav	End of Season	
1 July 2018	MF	(Czech Republic)	Daniel Trubač	Teplice	End of Season	
1 July 2018	FW	(Czech Republic)	Jan Kuchta	Slovácko	31 December 2018	
2 July 2018	MF	(Czech Republic)	Tomáš Freit	SFC Opava	End of Season	
18 July 2018	GK	(Czech Republic)	Martin Otáhal	Viktoria Žižkov	End of Season	
1 August 2018	FW	(Croatia)	Petar Musa	Viktoria Žižkov	End of Season	
7 September 2018	MF	(Austria)	Jonas Auer	Viktoria Žižkov	31 December 2018	
7 September 2018	MF	(Turkmenistan)	Ruslan Mingazow	Příbram	31 December 2018	
2 January 2019	FW	(Czech Republic)	Jan Kuchta	FK Teplice	End of Season	
3 January 2019	MF	(Czech Republic)	Matěj Valenta	Ústí nad Labem	End of Season	
4 January 2019	DF	(Czech Republic)	Lukáš Pokorný	Bohemians 1905	End of Season	
4 January 2019	FW	(Bahrain)	Abdulla Helal	Bohemians 1905	End of Season	
16 January 2019	GK	(Slovakia)	Martin Vantruba	Železiarne Podbrezová	End of Season	
19 February 2019	MF	(Czech Republic)	Jan Matoušek	1. FK Příbram	End of Season	
22 February 2019	DF	(Czech Republic)	Jakub Jugas	Mladá Boleslav	End of Season	
26 February 2019	MF	(Czech Republic)	Jan Sýkora	Slovan Liberec	End of Season	

=== Released ===
Date	Position	Nationality	Name	Joined	Date
15 June 2018	MF	(Portugal)	Danny	Marítimo	22 July 2018
30 June 2018	FW	(Czech Republic)	Zdeněk Linhart	SPG Pregarten	1 July 2018
9 July 2018	MF	(Czech Republic)	Pavel Bucha	Viktoria Plzeň	9 July 2018

== Pre-season and friendlies ==
Win Draw Loss

24 June 2018 Friendly	TJ CHS Chotěboř	1–9	Slavia Prague	Chotěboř
CEST (UTC+02:00)	Janda 78'	Report	Băluță 6'; Bořil 17', 48'; Souček 19'; Tecl 53'; Stoch 62'; Kuchta 69'; Musa 76'; Frydrych 84'

29 June 2018 Friendly	Slavia Prague	4–0	Viktoria Žižkov	Prague
CEST (UTC+02:00)	Musa 10'; T.Freit 45'; Kuchta 57'; V.Silhan 85'	Report		Stadium: Eden Arena

29 June 2018 Friendly	Slavia Prague (Czech Republic)	0–1	(Slovakia) Slovan Bratislava	Prague
18:30 CEST (UTC+02:00)	van Buren (penalty missed) 86'	Report	Šporar 51'; Moha (yellow card); Apau (yellow card); Šulla (yellow card)	Stadium: Eden Arena

4 July 2018 Friendly	Rapid Wien (Austria)	0–2	(Czech Republic) Slavia Prague	Wels, Austria
18:00 CEST (UTC+02:00)		Report	Tecl 25'; Sýkora 44'	Attendance: 1,400

7 July 2018 Friendly	Mezőkövesdi (Hungary)	2–1	(Czech Republic) Slavia Prague	Wieselburg, Austria
11:30 CEST (UTC+02:00)	Dražić 57', 82'	Report	Škoda 27'

7 July 2018 Friendly	Mezőkövesdi (Hungary)	1–3	(Czech Republic) Slavia Prague	Wieselburg, Austria
15:00 CEST (UTC+02:00)	R.Nagy 86'	Report	Stoch 52'; Sýkora 57'; Băluță 89'

14 July 2018 Friendly	Rostov (Russia)	1–2	(Czech Republic) Slavia Prague	Wieselburg, Austria
15:00 CEST (UTC+02:00)	Shomurodov 76'	Report	Stoch 34'; Tecl 51'

7 September 2018 Friendly	Nitra (Slovakia)	0–2	(Czech Republic) Slavia Prague	Nitra, Slovakia
19:00 CEST (UTC+02:00)		Report	Vejvar 60'; Stoch 82'	Stadium: Štadión pod Zoborom

19 January 2019 Friendly	Slavia Prague	8–0	Ústí nad Labem	Prague
14:00 CET (UTC+01:00)	Zmrhal 4'; Škoda 49', 70'; Traoré 51' van Buren 64'; Olayinka 65'; Dvorak 83' (o.g.); Ševčík 89'	Report		Stadium: Strahov Stadium

22 January 2019 Friendly	Slavia Prague (Czech Republic)	4–0	(China) Beijing Sinobo Guoan	Portugal
CET (UTC+1)	Olayinka 16'; Škoda 29', 45'; Mešanović 48'	Report

27 January 2019 Friendly	Slavia Prague (Czech Republic)	0–1	(Austria) Red Bull Salzburg	Portugal
CET (UTC+1)		Report	Daka 65'

28 January 2019 Friendly	Slavia Prague (Czech Republic)	4–0	(England) Brentford B	Portugal
16:30 CET (UTC+1)	van Buren 19'; Stoch 42'; Masopust 48'; Král 81'	Report

1 February 2019 Friendly	Slavia Prague (Czech Republic)	2–0	(Norway) Rosenborg	São João da Venda, Portugal
21:00 CET (UTC+1)	Stoch 3'; Olayinka 49'	Report		Stadium: Estádio Algarve

== Competitions ==
=== Overall record ===
Competition	First match	Last match	Starting round	Final position	Record							
Competition	First match	Last match	Starting round	Final position	Pld	W	D	L	GF	GA	GD	Win %
Czech First League	22 July 2018	26 May 2019	Matchday 1	Winners	35	26	5	4	79	26	+53	74.29
Czech Cup	26 September 2018	22 May 2019	Third round	Winners	5	5	0	0	15	1	+14	100.00
UEFA Champions League	7 August 2018	14 August 2018	Third qualifying round	Third qualifying round	2	0	1	1	1	3	−2	0.00
UEFA Europa League	20 September 2018	15 April 2019	Group stage	Quarter-finals	12	5	3	4	17	14	+3	41.67
Total					54	36	9	9	112	44	+68	66.67

Source: Soccerway

=== Czech First League ===
==== Regular stage ====
===== League table =====
Pos	Team	Pld	W	D	L	GF	GA	GD	Pts	Qualification or relegation
1	Slavia Prague	30	23	3	4	72	23	+49	72	Qualification for the championship group
2	Viktoria Plzeň	30	21	5	4	47	27	+20	68	Qualification for the championship group
3	Sparta Prague	30	17	6	7	52	27	+25	57	Qualification for the championship group
4	Jablonec	30	15	6	9	53	26	+27	51	Qualification for the championship group
5	Baník Ostrava	30	13	6	11	38	36	+2	45	Qualification for the championship group

Source: Fortuna liga, Soccerway
Rules for classification: 1) Points; 2) Head-to-head points; 3) Head-to-head goal difference; 4) Head-to-head goals scored; 5) Goal difference; 6) Goals scored; 7) Fair-play ranking; 8) Draw.

===== Results summary =====
Overall								Home						Away					
Pld	W	D	L	GF	GA	GD	Pts	W	D	L	GF	GA	GD	W	D	L	GF	GA	GD
30	23	3	4	72	23	+49	72	12	2	1	40	11	+29	11	1	3	32	12	+20

Last updated: 27 April 2019.
Source: See results

===== Results by round =====
Round	1	2	3	4	5	6	7	8	9	10	11	12	13	14	15	16	17	18	19	20	21	22	23	24	25	26	27	28	29	30
Ground	A	H	H	A	H	A	H	A	H	A	H	A	H	A	H	A	A	H	A	H	A	H	A	H	A	H	A	H	A	H
Result	W	W	W	W	L	W	W	W	W	L	W	W	W	D	W	W	W	W	W	W	L	W	W	W	W	D	W	D	L	W
Position	1	1	1	1	3	2	1	1	1	1	1	1	1	1	1	1	1	1	1	1	1	1	1	1	1	1	1	1	1	1

Source: See results
A = Away; H = Home; W = Win; D = Draw; L = Loss

===== Matches =====
22 July 2018 1	Sigma Olomouc	0–3	Slavia Prague	Olomouc
18:00 CEST (UTC+02:00)		Report	Tecl 22'; Stoch 30'; Hušbauer (yellow card) 52'; Ngadeu-Ngadjui (yellow card) 55'; Coufal 74'	Stadium: Andrův stadion Attendance: 9,548; Referee: Miroslav Zelinka

28 July 2018 2	Slavia Prague	4–0	Karviná	Prague
19:00 CEST (UTC+02:00)	Škoda 13' (pen.), 32'; Hušbauer 66'; Băluță 81'	Report		Stadium: Eden Arena; Attendance: 12,103; Referee: Petr Ardeleánu

3 August 2018 3	Slavia Prague	3–1	Opava	Prague
18:30 CEST (UTC+02:00)	Ngadeu-Ngadjui (yellow card) 5'; Hušbauer 20', 51' (pen.); Olayinka 90'	Report	Kuzmanović 80'; Radić 89'	Stadium: Eden Arena; Attendance: 13,127; Referee: Jiří Houdek

10 August 2018 4	Mladá Boleslav	0–1	Slavia Prague	Mladá Boleslav
18:30 CEST (UTC+02:00)	Ladra (yellow card) 88'	Report	Škoda 34'	Stadium: Městský Stadion; Attendance: 4,932; Referee: Pavel Julínek

18 August 2018 5	Slavia Prague	0–2	Jablonec	Prague
19:00 CEST (UTC+02:00)	Souček (yellow card) 43'; Škoda (yellow card) 58'; Sýkora (yellow card) 85'; Pokorný (yellow card) 87'	Report	Doležal 44'; Holeš 77'	Stadium: Eden Arena; Attendance: 13,263; Referee: Ondej Berka

25 August 2018 6	Teplice	0–3	Slavia Prague	Teplice
19:00 CEST (UTC+02:00)	Shejbal (yellow card) 74'	Report	Tecl 14' (yellow card) 51'; Kúdela 34'; Sýkora 59'	Stadium: Na Stínadlech; Attendance: 7,487; Referee: Zbynek Proske

1 September 2018 7	Slavia Prague	4–0	Viktoria Plzeň	Prague
19:00 CEST (UTC+02:00)	Souček 3', 90+1'; Stoch 40' (pen.); Hušbauer (yellow card) 51'; Zmrhal 71'; Ngadeu-Ngadjui (yellow card) 87'	Report	Hubník (yellow card) 27' (yellow-red card) 39'; Limberský (yellow card) 39'; Krmenčík (yellow card) 90+3'	Stadium: Eden Arena; Attendance: 17,338; Referee: Petr Ardeleánu

16 September 2018 8	Slovácko	1–3	Slavia Prague	Uherské Hradiště
18:00 CEST (UTC+02:00)	Daníček 82' (pen.) (yellow card) 90+3'; Kubala (yellow card) 90+1'; Hofmann (yellow card) 90+5'	Report	Kúdela 26'; Coufal 30'; Tecl 57'; Bořil (yellow card) 84'	Stadium: Městský fotbalový stadion Miroslava Valenty; Attendance: 5,627; Referee: Miroslav Zelinka

23 September 2018 9	Slavia Prague	1–0	Bohemians 1905	Prague
18:00 CEST (UTC+02:00)	Zmrhal 38'; Zelený (yellow card) 83'; Frydrych (yellow card) 90+3'	Report	D.Krch (yellow card) 86'	Stadium: Eden Arena; Attendance: 15,272; Referee: Ondej Pechanec

30 September 2018 10	Baník Ostrava	2–1	Slavia Prague	Ostrava
15:00 CEST (UTC+02:00)	Baroš (red card) 15'; Fillo (yellow card) 15' (goal) 20', 45+4'; Granečný (yellow card) 84'; Fleišman (yellow card) 85'	Report	Stoch 27' (yellow card) 67'; Bořil (yellow card) 36'; Traoré (yellow card) 37'; Hušbauer (yellow card) 60'; Olayinka (yellow card) 81'; Mešanović (yellow card) 90+2'	Stadium: Městský Stadion; Attendance: 14,294; Referee: Ondej Berka

7 October 2018 11	Slavia Prague	4–1	1. FK Příbram	Prague
18:00 CEST (UTC+02:00)	Bořil 14' (yellow card) 90+1'; Băluță 32'; Frydrych 35'; Stoch 75'	Report	Rezek 15'; Hlúpik (yellow card) 57'	Stadium: Eden Arena; Attendance: 10,747; Referee: Pavel Kralovec

21 October 2018 12	Slovan Liberec	0–1	Slavia Prague	Liberec
17:00 CEST (UTC+02:00)	Mikula (yellow card) 2' (yellow-red card) 12'; Kacharaba (yellow card) 16'	Report	Stoch 3'; Souček (yellow card) 29'; Traoré (yellow card) 39'; Kúdela (yellow card) 57'; Bořil (yellow card) 64'; Ngadeu-Ngadjui (yellow card) 74'; Kolář (yellow card) 90+2'; Frydrych (yellow card) 90+4'; Zmrhal (yellow card) 90+5'	Stadium: Stadion u Nisy; Attendance: 8,875; Referee: Radek Prihoda

29 October 2018 13	Slavia Prague	4–1	Dukla Prague	Prague
18:00 CET (UTC+01:00)	Coufal 14'; Stoch 21', 85'; Olayinka 49'	Report	Ostojić (yellow card) 42'; Schranz 66' (pen.); Doudera (yellow card) 90'	Stadium: Eden Arena; Attendance: 11,108; Referee: Miroslav Zelinka

4 November 2018 14	Sparta Prague	2–2	Slavia Prague	Prague
17:00 CET (UTC+01:00)	Kanga (yellow card) 16' (goal) 45+2' (pen.); Radaković (yellow card) 31'; Chipciu (yellow card) 40'; Tetteh 42'	Report	Ngadeu-Ngadjui (yellow card) 7'; Kúdela 36' (yellow card) 44'; Traoré (yellow card) 45+1'; Souček (yellow card) 48' (goal) 70'; Olayinka (yellow card) 84'	Stadium: Generali Arena; Attendance: 17,398; Referee: Petr Ardeleánu

11 November 2018 15	Slavia Prague	3–1	Fastav Zlín	Prague
17:00 CET (UTC+01:00)	Frydrych 21'; Stoch 45+1', 47' (pen.); Olayinka (yellow card) 56'; Bořil (yellow card) 80'	Report	Vyhnal 16'; Matejov (yellow card) 36'; Hnaníček (yellow card) 45'; Bartošák (yellow card) 73'	Stadium: Eden Arena; Attendance: 10,107; Referee: Karel Hrubes

24 November 2018 16	MFK Karviná	1–3	Slavia Prague	Karviná
14:00 CET (UTC+01:00)	Bořil 31' (o.g.); Piroch (yellow card) 84'	Report	Souček 10'; Kúdela (yellow card) 27'; Stoch 33' (pen.); Olayinka 75'	Stadium: Městský stadion Attendance: 3,612; Referee: Pavel Franek

3 December 2018 17	Opava	2–3	Slavia Prague	Opava
18:00 CET (UTC+01:00)	Zavadil 38' (pen.) (yellow card) 87'; Jursa (yellow card) 45+2'; Kuzmanović 53'; Žídek (yellow card) 60'; Smola (yellow card) 66' (yellow-red card) 70'	Report	Zmrhal 24', 58'; Bořil (yellow card) 37'; Ngadeu-Ngadjui (yellow card) 45'; Hušbauer (yellow card) 71'; Souček 74'	Stadium: Stadion v Městských sadech Attendance: 5,836; Referee: Ondej Pechanec

8 December 2018 18	Slavia Prague	3–2	Mladá Boleslav	Prague
17:00 CET (UTC+01:00)	Škoda 20' (pen.); Stoch 51'; Olayinka 73'	Report	Džafić (yellow card) 20'; Mareš (yellow card) 54'; Hubínek (yellow card) 61'; Matějovský (yellow card) 70'; Komlichenko 87', 90+2' (pen.)	Stadium: Eden Arena; Attendance: 9,091; Referee: Zbynek Proske

17 December 2018 19	Jablonec	0–2	Slavia Prague	Jablonec nad Nisou
18:00 CET (UTC+01:00)	Jovović (yellow card) 68'	Report	Škoda 18' (pen.); Stoch (yellow card) 21'; Ngadeu-Ngadjui (yellow card) 28'; Coufal (yellow card) 68'; Hušbauer 70'	Stadium: Stadion Střelnice; Attendance: 3,115; Referee: Ondej Berka

9 February 2019 20	Slavia Prague	2–0	Teplice	Prague
17:00 CET (UTC+01:00)	Bořil (yellow card) 12'; Souček 83' (pen.) van Buren 84'	Report	Ljevaković (yellow card) 33'; Jeřábek (yellow card) 51' (yellow-red card) 82'	Stadium: Eden Arena; Attendance: 10,847; Referee: Ondej Pechanec

17 February 2019 21	Viktoria Plzeň	2–0	Slavia Prague	Plzeň
17:00 CET (UTC+01:00)	Limberský (yellow card) 21'; Chorý 44'; Beauguel 82'; Hubník (yellow card) 83'	Report	Ševčík (yellow card) 18'; Hušbauer (yellow card) 64'; Olayinka (yellow card) 73'	Stadium: Doosan Arena; Attendance: 11,140; Referee: Pavel Franek

25 February 2019 22	Slavia Prague	4–0	Slovácko	Prague
18:00 CET (UTC+01:00)	Škoda 26'; Masopust 40'; Hušbauer 57'; Souček 76'; Kúdela (yellow card) 83'; Traoré (yellow card) 85'	Report	Daníček (yellow card) 59'; Navrátil (yellow card) 61'; Divíšek (yellow card) 68'	Stadium: Eden Arena; Attendance: 10,089; Referee: Petr Ardeleánu

3 March 2019 23	Bohemians 1905	0–3	Slavia Prague	Prague
15:00 CET (UTC+01:00)	Krch (yellow card) 24'; Vacek (yellow card) 40'	Report	Souček 26' (pen.); Škoda (yellow card) 31' (goal) 45+3'; Hušbauer 78' (yellow card) 84'	Stadium: Ďolíček; Attendance: 4,959; Referee: Pavel Kralovec

10 March 2019 24	Slavia Prague	4–0	Baník Ostrava	Prague
17:30 CET (UTC+01:00)	Škoda 18'; Souček (yellow card) 33'; Frydrych (yellow card) 59' (goal) 90+3'; Masopust 70' van Buren 90+7'	Report	Diop (yellow card) 5'; Meshchaninov (yellow card) 53'; Jánoš (yellow card) 82'	Stadium: Eden Arena; Attendance: 14,126; Referee: Martin Nenadál

17 March 2019 25	1. FK Příbram	0–2	Slavia Prague	Příbram
17:30 CET (UTC+01:00)	Průcha (yellow card) 60'; Hlúpik (yellow card) 73'	Report	Olayinka 3'; Hušbauer 65'; Kúdela (yellow card) 83'	Stadium: Na Litavce; Attendance: 7,132; Referee: Miroslav Zelinka

30 March 2019 26	Slavia Prague	1–1	Slovan Liberec	Prague
17:30 CET (UTC+01:00)	Zmrhal (yellow card) 54'; Bořil 69'	Report	Kozák (yellow card) 34'; Malinský (yellow card) 46'; Breite 73'; Karafiát (yellow card) 79'	Stadium: Eden Arena; Attendance: 16,217; Referee: Jan Machálek

6 April 2019 27	Dukla Prague	1–5	Slavia Prague	Prague
19:00 CEST (UTC+02:00)	Doudera 77'; Podaný (yellow card) 84'; Holenda (red card) 87'	Report	Masopust 13'; Stoch 18'; Hušbauer 22', 54'; Souček 90'	Stadium: Stadion Juliska; Attendance: 7,765; Referee: Pavel Franek

14 April 2019 28	Slavia Prague	1–1	Sparta Prague	Prague
18:00 CEST (UTC+02:00)	Frydrych (yellow card) 10'; Hušbauer (yellow card) 14'; Souček 19'; Masopust (yellow card) 45+6'	Report	Štetina (yellow card) 42'; Kanga (yellow card) 45+8'; Plavšić 53'; Niță (yellow card) 90+4'	Stadium: Eden Arena; Attendance: 19,370; Referee: Karel Hrubes

21 April 2019 29	Fastav Zlín	1–0	Slavia Prague	Zlín
17:00 CEST (UTC+02:00)	Vyhnal (yellow card) 34'; Poznar (yellow card) 53'; Dzafic 60'; Rakovan (yellow card) 70'; Buchta (yellow card) 73'; Hlinka (yellow card) 79'	Report	Škoda (yellow card) 22'; Traoré (yellow card) 61'	Stadium: Letná Stadion; Attendance: 5,672; Referee: Pavel Kralovec

27 April 2019 30	Slavia Prague	2–1	Sigma Olomouc	Prague
17:00 CEST (UTC+02:00)	Olayinka 26' van Buren 60'	Report	Yunis 7'; Lalkovič (yellow card) 90+1'	Stadium: Eden Arena; Attendance: 12,959; Referee: Petr Ardeleánu

==== Championship group ====
===== League table =====
Pos	Team	Pld	W	D	L	GF	GA	GD	Pts	Qualification
1	Slavia Prague (C)	35	26	5	4	79	26	+53	83	Qualification for the Champions League play-off round
2	Viktoria Plzeň	35	24	6	5	57	32	+25	78	Qualification for the Champions League second qualifying round
3	Sparta Prague	35	20	6	9	59	33	+26	66	Qualification for the Europa League third qualifying round
4	Jablonec	35	17	6	12	58	32	+26	57	Qualification for the Europa League second qualifying round
5	Baník Ostrava	35	13	8	14	39	43	−4	47	Qualification for the Europa League play-offs final
6	Slovan Liberec	35	12	10	13	34	32	+2	46	

Source: Fortuna liga, Soccerway
Rules for classification: 1) Points; 2) Head-to-head points; 3) Head-to-head goal difference; 4) Head-to-head goals scored; 5) Goal difference; 6) Goals scored; 7) Fair-play ranking; 8) Draw.
(C) Champions

===== Results summary =====
Overall								Home						Away					
Pld	W	D	L	GF	GA	GD	Pts	W	D	L	GF	GA	GD	W	D	L	GF	GA	GD
5	3	2	0	7	3	+4	11	3	0	0	7	3	+4	0	2	0	0	0	0

Last updated: 26 May 2019.
Source: See results

===== Results by round =====
Round	1	2	3	4	5
Ground	A	H	H	A	H
Result	D	W	W	D	W
Position	1	1	1	1	1

Source: See results
A = Away; H = Home; W = Win; D = Draw; L = Loss

===== Matches =====
4 May 2019 31	Slovan Liberec	0–0	Slavia Prague	Liberec
20:00 CEST (UTC+02:00)	Malinský (yellow card) 38'; Dorley (yellow card) 62'; Nešický (yellow card) 90+3'	Report	Olayinka (yellow card) 57'	Stadium: Stadion u Nisy; Attendance: 7,523; Referee: Emanuel Marek

12 May 2019 32	Slavia Prague	3–1	Viktoria Plzeň	Prague
18:00 CEST (UTC+02:00)	Masopust 80'; Souček 87' (pen.); Traoré 89'	Report	Kayamba (yellow card) 52'; Procházka (yellow card) 59'; Hořava (yellow card) 70'; Řezník (yellow card) 84'; Hejda (yellow card) 84'; Kovařík 90+1'	Stadium: Eden Arena; Attendance: 18,327; Referee: Miroslav Zelinka

15 May 2019 33	Slavia Prague	2–1	Jablonec	Prague
20:00 CEST (UTC+02:00)	Traoré 33'; Hušbauer (yellow card) 75'; Souček 86'; Băluță (yellow card) 88'	Report	Holeš 10'; Sobol (yellow card) 43'; Břečka (yellow card) 52'	Stadium: Eden Arena; Attendance: 11,124; Referee: Martin Nenadál

19 May 2019 34	Baník Ostrava	0–0	Slavia Prague	Ostrava
15:00 CEST (UTC+02:00)		Report	van Buren (yellow card) 63'	Stadium: Městský Stadion; Attendance: 11,896; Referee: Karel Hrubes

26 May 2019 35	Slavia Prague	2–1	Sparta Prague	Prague
15:00 CEST (UTC+02:00)	Souček 7' (yellow card) 58'; Băluță (yellow card) 45+1' (goal) 50'; Stoch (yellow card) 90+1'	Report	Kanga 21' (pen.) (yellow card) 22'; Plavšić (yellow card) 79'	Stadium: Eden Arena; Attendance: 17,000; Referee: Ondej Berka

=== Czech Cup ===
26 September 2018 Third round	Slavia Prague	2–0	Ústí nad Labem	Prague
18:30 CEST (UTC+02:00)	Mešanović 37' (pen.); Vejvar 67'	Report		Stadium: Eden Arena; Attendance: 3,106; Referee: Ondej Lerch

16 November 2018 Fourth round	Slavia Prague	3–1	Chrudim	Prague
18:30 CET (UTC+01:00)	Sýkora 10'; Hušbauer 22' (pen.); Frydrych 68'	Report	D.Sixta (yellow card) 36'; D.Vašulín 70'; M.Sulik (yellow card) 72'	Stadium: Eden Arena; Attendance: 3,512; Referee: Ondej Ginzel

3 April 2019 Quarter-finals	Slavia Prague	5–0	Karviná	Prague
17:30 CEST (UTC+02:00)	Frydrych 40'; Băluță 43' (yellow card) 87' van Buren 51', 67'; Hušbauer 59'	Report	Dramé (yellow card) 29'; Čolić (yellow card) 82'	Stadium: Eden Aréna; Attendance: 5,749; Referee: Jan Váňa

24 April 2019 Semi-finals	Slavia Prague	3–0	Sparta Prague	Prague
19:30 CEST (UTC+02:00)	Souček 25', 45+3' (yellow card) 45+5'; Masopust 51' van Buren (yellow card) 71'; Bořil (yellow card) 87'	Report	Nhamoinesu (yellow card) 27'; Frýdek (yellow card) 45+5'; Kanga (yellow card) 45+5'; Tetteh (yellow card) 87'	Stadium: Eden Aréna; Attendance: 16,264; Referee: Ondej Pechanec

22 May 2019 Final	Baník Ostrava	0–2	Slavia Prague	Olomouc
19:15 CEST (UTC+02:00)	Holzer (yellow card) 38'; Procházka (yellow card) 86'	Report	Škoda (yellow card) 29'; Souček 36' (pen.); Traoré (yellow card) 41'; Masopust (yellow card) 68' (goal) 78'; Kolář (yellow card) 84'; Bořil (yellow card) 86'	Stadium: Andrův stadion Attendance: 11,661; Referee: Petr Ardeleánu

=== UEFA Champions League ===
==== Qualifying rounds ====
===== Third qualifying round =====
7 August 2018 First leg	Slavia Prague (Czech Republic)	1–1	(Ukraine) Dynamo Kyiv	Prague, Czech Republic
19:30 CEST (UTC+02:00)	Hušbauer (yellow card) 86' (goal) 90+5' (pen.); Coufal (yellow card) 89'	Report	Buyalskyi (yellow card) 65'; Verbič 82'; Kędziora (yellow card) 90+3'	Stadium: Eden Arena; Attendance: 19,370; Referee: Craig Pawson (England)

14 August 2018 Second leg	Dynamo Kyiv (Ukraine)	2–0 (3–1 agg.)	(Czech Republic) Slavia Prague	Kyiv, Ukraine
18:30 CEST (UTC+02:00)	Verbič 11'; Besyedin 74'	Report	Hušbauer (yellow card) 38'; Kovář (yellow card) 39'; Bořil (yellow card) 86'; Coufal (yellow card) 89'; Frydrych (yellow card) 90+4'	Stadium: NSC Olimpiyskiy Stadium; Attendance: 39,318; Referee: Daniel Stefański (Poland)

=== UEFA Europa League ===
==== Group stage ====
Pos	Team	Pld	W	D	L	GF	GA	GD	Pts	Qualification
1	(Russia) Zenit Saint Petersburg	6	3	2	1	6	5	+1	11	Advance to knockout phase
2	(Czech Republic) Slavia Prague	6	3	1	2	4	3	+1	10	Advance to knockout phase
3	(France) Bordeaux	6	2	1	3	6	6	0	7	
4	(Denmark) Copenhagen	6	1	2	3	3	5	−2	5	

Source: UEFA
Rules for classification: Group stage tiebreakers

20 September 2018 1	Slavia Prague (Czech Republic)	1–0	(France) Bordeaux	Prague, Czech Republic
21:00 CEST (UTC+02:00)	Ngadeu-Ngadjui (yellow card) 29'; Zmrhal 35'	Report	Sankharé (yellow card) 66'; Palencia (yellow card) 68'; Kalu (yellow card) 75'	Stadium: Eden Arena; Attendance: 16,548; Referee: Bas Nijhuis (Netherlands)

4 October 2018 2	Zenit St.Petersburg (Russia)	1–0	(Czech Republic) Slavia Prague	Saint Petersburg, Russia
18:55 CEST (UTC+02:00)	Kokorin 80'; Neto (yellow card) 90+5'	Report	Souček (yellow card) 36'; Băluță (yellow card) 60'	Stadium: Krestovsky Stadium; Attendance: 45,408; Referee: Hüseyin Göçek (Turkey)

25 October 2018 3	Copenhagen (Denmark)	0–1	(Czech Republic) Slavia Prague	Copenhagen, Denmark
18:55 CEST (UTC+02:00)	Sotiriou (yellow card) 1'; N'Doye (yellow card) 23'	Report	Bořil (yellow card) 39'; Matoušek 46'; Coufal (yellow card) 55'; Traoré (yellow card) 64'	Stadium: Parken Stadium; Attendance: 20,672; Referee: Luca Banti (Italy)

8 November 2018 4	Slavia Prague (Czech Republic)	0–0	(Denmark) Copenhagen	Prague, Czech Republic
21:00 CET (UTC+01:00)	Ngadeu-Ngadjui (yellow card) 52'; Bořil (yellow card) 55'	Report	N'Doye (yellow card) 84'	Stadium: Eden Arena; Attendance: 18,702; Referee: Mattias Gestranius (Finland)

29 November 2018 5	Bordeaux (France)	2–0	(Czech Republic) Slavia Prague	Bordeaux, France
18:55 CET (UTC+01:00)	De Préville 49'; Sankharé (yellow card) 84'; Koundé 90+5'	Report	Bořil (yellow card) 52'; Deli (yellow card) 56'; Olayinka (yellow card) 59'	Stadium: Nouveau Stade de Bordeaux; Attendance: 6,311; Referee: Fábio Veríssimo (Portugal)

13 December 2018 6	Slavia Prague (Czech Republic)	2–0	(Russia) Zenit St.Petersburg	Prague, Czech Republic
21:00 CET (UTC+01:00)	Škoda (yellow card) 25'; Zmrhal 32'; Stoch 41' (yellow card) 86'	Report	Nabiullin (yellow card) 37'; Hernani (yellow card) 67'	Stadium: Eden Arena; Attendance: 17,748; Referee: Andrew Dallas (Scotland)

==== Knockout phase ====
===== Round of 32 =====
14 February 2019 First leg	Slavia Prague (Czech Republic)	0–0	(Belgium) Genk	Prague, Czech Republic
18:55 CET (UTC+01:00)	Ngadeu-Ngadjui (yellow card) 41'; Kúdela (yellow card) 48'; Bořil (yellow card) 70'	Report	Heynen (yellow card) 26'; Malinovskyi (yellow card) 44'; Samatta (yellow card) 89'	Stadium: Sinobo Stadium; Attendance: 18,125; Referee: Andris Treimanis (Latvia)

21 February 2019 Second leg	Genk (Belgium)	1–4 (1–4 agg.)	(Czech Republic) Slavia Prague	Genk, Belgium
21:00 CET (UTC+01:00)	Trossard 10'; Wouters (yellow card) 45'	Report	Coufal 23'; Kúdela (yellow card) 40'; Traoré (yellow card) 41' (goal) 53'; Škoda (yellow card) 51' (goal) 64', 68'	Stadium: Luminus Arena; Attendance: 13,688; Referee: Bobby Madden (Scotland)

===== Round of 16 =====
7 March 2019 First leg	Sevilla (Spain)	2–2	(Czech Republic) Slavia Prague	Seville, Spain
18:55 CET (UTC+01:00)	Ben Yedder 1'; Banega (yellow card) 12'; Munir 28'	Report	Coufal (yellow card) 5'; Stoch 25'; Král 39'; Masopust (yellow card) 44'; Souček (yellow card) 63'	Stadium: Ramón Sánchez Pizjuán; Attendance: 30,698; Referee: Ruddy Buquet (France)

14 March 2019 Second leg	Slavia Prague (Czech Republic)	4–3 (a.e.t.) (6–5 agg.)	(Spain) Sevilla	Prague, Czech Republic
21:00 CET (UTC+01:00)	Ngadeu-Ngadjui 15'; Kolář (yellow card) 43'; Souček 47' (pen.) (yellow card) 110'; Král (yellow card) 67'; Olayinka (yellow card) 88'; Van Buren 102'; Traoré 119'	Report	Ben Yedder 44' (pen.); Munir 54'; Vázquez 98' (yellow card) 98'	Stadium: Sinobo Stadium; Attendance: 19,020; Referee: Aleksei Kulbakov (Belarus)

===== Quarter-finals =====
11 April 2019 First leg	Slavia Prague (Czech Republic)	0–1	(England) Chelsea	Prague, Czech Republic
21:00 CEST (UTC+02:00)	Coufal (yellow card) 83'	Report	Alonso 86'	Stadium: Sinobo Stadium; Attendance: 17,484; Referee: Felix Zwayer (Germany)

18 April 2019 Second leg	Chelsea (England)	4–3 (5–3 agg.)	(Czech Republic) Slavia Prague	London, England
21:00 CEST (UTC+02:00)	Pedro 5', 27'; Deli 9' (o.g.); Giroud 17'; Kanté (yellow card) 34'; Emerson (yellow card) 75'; Kepa (yellow card) 83'; Luiz (yellow card) 90'	Report	Souček 25' (yellow card) 53'; Ševčík 51', 55'; Kúdela (yellow card) 73'	Stadium: Stamford Bridge; Attendance: 38,326; Referee: Damir Skomina (Slovenia)

== Squad statistics ==
As of match played 26 May 2019

=== Appearances and goals ===
No.	Pos	Nat	Player	Total		HET liga		MOL Cup		Champions League		Europa League	
No.	Pos	Nat	Player	Apps	Goals	Apps	Goals	Apps	Goals	Apps	Goals	Apps	Goals
1	GK	(Czech Republic) CZE	Ondřej Kolář	49	0	33	0	2	0	2	0	12	0
2	MF	(Czech Republic) CZE	Jan Vejvar	1	1	0	0	1	1	0	0	0	0
5	DF	(Czech Republic) CZE	Vladimír Coufal	39	4	28	3	0	0	2	0	9	1
8	MF	(Czech Republic) CZE	Jaromír Zmrhal	38	6	20+3	4	1	0	2	0	10+2	2
9	MF	(Nigeria) NGR	Peter Olayinka	39	6	15+9	6	3+2	0	0+1	0	3+6	0
10	MF	(Czech Republic) CZE	Josef Hušbauer	46	12	32+1	9	4	2	2	1	6+1	0
11	FW	(Czech Republic) CZE	Stanislav Tecl	14	3	6+4	3	0	0	1+1	0	1+1	0
12	DF	(Czech Republic) CZE	Jaroslav Zelený	17	0	9+4	0	3	0	0	0	1	0
13	DF	(Cameroon) CMR	Michael Ngadeu-Ngadjui	45	1	29	0	3	0	2	0	10+1	1
14	FW	(Netherlands) NED	Mick van Buren	19	6	4+9	3	2	2	0	0	0+4	1
15	DF	(Czech Republic) CZE	Ondřej Kúdela	33	3	21+1	3	1+1	0	0	0	9	0
17	MF	(Slovakia) SVK	Miroslav Stoch	49	14	27+6	12	0+2	0	2	0	10+2	2
18	DF	(Czech Republic) CZE	Jan Bořil	47	2	27+2	2	5	0	2	0	11	0
19	DF	(Ivory Coast) CIV	Simon Deli	36	0	19+2	0	4	0	2	0	7+2	0
20	MF	(Romania) ROU	Alexandru Băluță	32	4	13+9	3	3+1	1	0+2	0	0+4	0
21	FW	(Czech Republic) CZE	Milan Škoda	40	10	17+11	8	2	0	1+1	0	4+4	2
22	MF	(Czech Republic) CZE	Tomáš Souček	49	18	34	13	2	3	2	0	11	2
23	MF	(Czech Republic) CZE	Petr Ševčík	9	4	4+1	0	0+1	2	0	0	3	2
25	DF	(Czech Republic) CZE	Michal Frydrych	31	3	6+13	3	5	0	0+1	0	1+5	0
26	MF	(Slovakia) SVK	Jakub Hromada	1	0	0+1	0	0	0	0	0	0	0
27	MF	(Ivory Coast) CIV	Ibrahim Traoré	32	4	9+7	2	4+1	0	0	0	10+1	2
28	MF	(Czech Republic) CZE	Lukáš Masopust	19	6	10+2	4	2	2	0	0	5	0
29	DF	(Czech Republic) CZE	Tomáš Vlček	2	0	0	0	0+2	0	0	0	0	0
31	GK	(Czech Republic) CZE	Přemysl Kovář	5	0	2	0	3	0	0	0	0	0
33	MF	(Czech Republic) CZE	Alex Král	20	1	9+3	0	1+1	0	0	0	5+1	1
	MF	(Czech Republic) CZE	Michal Vaněk	1	0	0	0	0+1	0	0	0	0	0
Players away from Slavia Prague on loan:
4	DF	(Czech Republic) CZE	Jakub Jugas	1	0	0	0	1	0	0	0	0	0
6	MF	(Czech Republic) CZE	Jan Sýkora	17	2	8+4	1	1	1	2	0	1+1	0
16	MF	(Czech Republic) CZE	Jan Matoušek	13	1	2+5	0	1+1	0	0	0	3+1	1
28	DF	(Czech Republic) CZE	Lukáš Pokorný	2	0	1+1	0	0	0	0	0	0	0
29	MF	(Czech Republic) CZE	Matěj Valenta	2	0	0+1	0	1	0	0	0	0	0
Players who left Slavia Prague during the season:
24	FW	(Bosnia and Herzegovina) BIH	Muris Mešanović	7	1	0+5	0	1+1	1	0	0	0	0

=== Goal scorers ===
Place	Position	Nation	Number	Name	HET liga	MOL Cup	Champions League	Europa League	Total
1	MF	(Czech Republic)	22	Tomáš Souček	13	3	0	2	18
2	MF	(Slovakia)	17	Miroslav Stoch	12	0	0	2	14
3	MF	(Czech Republic)	10	Josef Hušbauer	9	2	1	0	12
4	FW	(Czech Republic)	21	Milan Škoda	8	0	0	2	10
5	MF	(Nigeria)	9	Peter Olayinka	6	0	0	0	6
5	MF	(Czech Republic)	8	Jaromír Zmrhal	4	0	0	2	6
5	MF	(Czech Republic)	28	Lukáš Masopust	4	2	0	0	6
5	FW	(Netherlands)	14	Mick van Buren	3	2	0	1	6
9	DF	(Czech Republic)	25	Michal Frydrych	3	2	0	0	5
10	MF	(Romania)	20	Alexandru Băluță	3	1	0	0	4
10	DF	(Czech Republic)	5	Vladimír Coufal	3	0	0	1	4
10	MF	(Ivory Coast)	27	Ibrahim Traoré	2	0	0	2	4
13	FW	(Czech Republic)	11	Stanislav Tecl	3	0	0	0	3
13	DF	(Czech Republic)	15	Ondřej Kúdela	3	0	0	0	3
15	DF	(Czech Republic)	18	Jan Bořil	2	0	0	0	2
15	MF	(Czech Republic)	6	Jan Sýkora	1	1	0	0	2
15	MF	(Czech Republic)	23	Petr Ševčík	0	0	0	2	2
18	FW	(Bosnia and Herzegovina)	24	Muris Mešanović	0	1	0	0	1
18	MF	(Czech Republic)	2	Jan Vejvar	0	1	0	0	1
18	MF	(Czech Republic)	16	Jan Matoušek	0	0	0	1	1
18	MF	(Czech Republic)	33	Alex Král	0	0	0	1	1
18	DF	(Cameroon)	13	Michael Ngadeu-Ngadjui	0	0	0	1	1
				TOTALS	79	15	1	17	112

=== Disciplinary record ===
Number	Nation	Position	Name	HET liga		MOL Cup		Champions League		Europa League		Total	
Number	Nation	Position	Name	Yellow card	Red card	Yellow card	Red card	Yellow card	Red card	Yellow card	Red card	Yellow card	Red card
1	(Czech Republic)	GK	Ondřej Kolář	1	0	1	0	0	0	1	0	3	0
5	(Czech Republic)	DF	Vladimír Coufal	1	0	0	0	2	0	3	0	6	0
8	(Czech Republic)	MF	Jaromír Zmrhal	2	0	0	0	0	0	0	0	2	0
9	(Nigeria)	MF	Peter Olayinka	5	0	0	0	0	0	2	0	7	0
10	(Czech Republic)	MF	Josef Hušbauer	8	0	0	0	2	0	0	0	10	0
11	(Czech Republic)	FW	Stanislav Tecl	1	0	0	0	0	0	0	0	1	0
12	(Czech Republic)	DF	Jaroslav Zelený	1	0	0	0	0	0	0	0	1	0
13	(Cameroon)	DF	Michael Ngadeu-Ngadjui	7	0	0	0	0	0	3	0	10	0
14	(Netherlands)	FW	Mick van Buren	1	0	1	0	0	0	0	0	2	0
15	(Czech Republic)	DF	Ondřej Kúdela	5	0	0	0	0	0	3	0	8	0
17	(Slovakia)	MF	Miroslav Stoch	3	0	0	0	0	0	1	0	4	0
18	(Czech Republic)	DF	Jan Bořil	7	0	2	0	1	0	4	0	14	0
19	(Ivory Coast)	DF	Simon Deli	0	0	0	0	0	0	1	0	1	0
20	(Romania)	MF	Alexandru Băluță	2	0	1	0	0	0	1	0	4	0
21	(Czech Republic)	FW	Milan Škoda	3	0	1	0	0	0	2	0	6	0
22	(Czech Republic)	MF	Tomáš Souček	5	0	1	0	0	0	4	0	10	0
23	(Czech Republic)	MF	Petr Ševčík	1	0	0	0	0	0	0	0	1	0
24	(Bosnia and Herzegovina)	FW	Muris Mešanović	1	0	0	0	0	0	0	0	1	0
25	(Czech Republic)	DF	Michal Frydrych	4	0	0	0	1	0	0	0	5	0
27	(Ivory Coast)	MF	Ibrahim Traoré	5	0	1	0	0	0	2	0	8	0
28	(Czech Republic)	MF	Lukáš Masopust	1	0	1	0	0	0	1	0	3	0
31	(Czech Republic)	GK	Přemysl Kovář	0	0	0	0	1	0	0	0	1	0
33	(Czech Republic)	MF	Alex Král	0	0	0	0	0	0	1	0	1	0
Players away on loan:
6	(Czech Republic)	MF	Jan Sýkora	1	0	0	0	0	0	0	0	1	0
28	(Czech Republic)	DF	Lukáš Pokorný	1	0	0	0	0	0	0	0	1	0
Players who left Slavia Prague during the season:
			TOTALS	66	0	9	0	7	0	29	0	111	0
