= Miroslav Stoch =

Slovak professional footballer

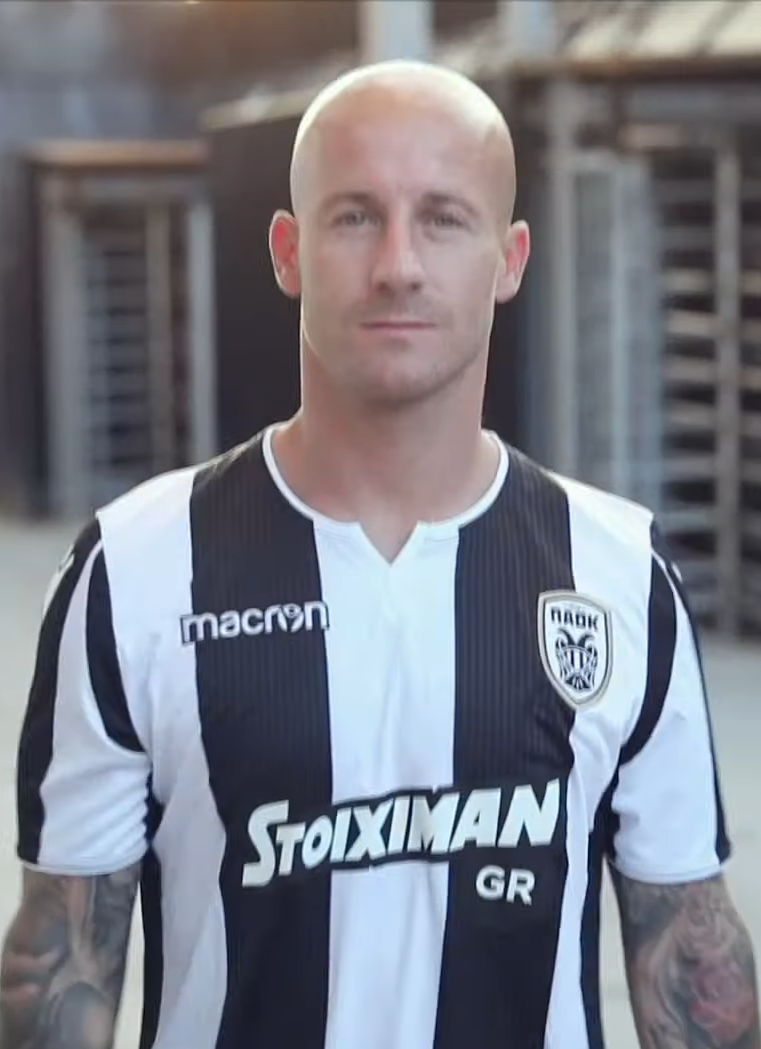
- Stoch with PAOK in 2019

Personal information
- Date of birth: 19 October 1989 (age 37)
- Place of birth: Nitra, Czechoslovakia
- Height: 1.67 m (5 ft 6 in)
- Position: Winger

Team information
- Current team: Nitra
- Number: 9

Youth career
- 1995–2005: Nitra

Senior career*
Years	Team	Apps	(Gls)
2005–2006	Nitra	4	(0)
2006–2010	Chelsea	4	(0)
2009–2010	→ Twente (loan)	32	(10)
2010–2017	Fenerbahçe	82	(14)
2013–2014	→ PAOK (loan)	30	(7)
2014–2015	→ Al Ain (loan)	25	(9)
2015–2016	→ Bursaspor (loan)	25	(1)
2017–2019	Slavia Prague	59	(16)
2019–2020	PAOK	11	(0)
2021	Zagłębie Lubin	8	(0)
2021–2022	Slovan Liberec	12	(1)
2022–2024	Motorlet Prague	36	(13)
2026–	Nitra B	4	(1)
2026–	Nitra	6	(0)
Total		328	(71)

International career
2007–2008	Slovakia U19	12	(11)
2008–2009	Slovakia U21	7	(2)
2009–2019	Slovakia	60	(6)
- * Club domestic league appearances and goals

Miroslav Stoch (born 19 October 1989) is a Slovak professional footballer who plays for Nitra as a winger.

He earned 60 caps for Slovakia, first debuting in 2009, and was included in their squad for the 2010 FIFA World Cup and UEFA Euro 2016.

He won the 2012 FIFA Puskás Award, after he scored a volley from outside the penalty area into the top corner of the goal during a Süper Lig match against Gençlerbirliği.

== Club career ==
=== Early career and Chelsea ===
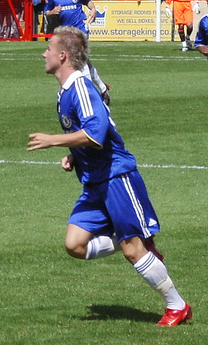
Stoch with Chelsea in March 2009

Stoch's father realized his talent at an early age and placed him with his local club's academy Nitra. His hard work paid off as he was drafted into Nitra's first team after scoring a hat-trick in an under-17 match, at only 15 years old. Due to age restrictions in the Slovak First League, he could not play until his 16th birthday. He made his first-team debut at the age of 16 and by this time he was already being watched by European scouts.

Chelsea had scouts in one of the international competitions he played in and offered him a trial around the same time that Nice was about to sign him. He duly impressed and was signed by Chelsea's youth academy in 2006. He was a regular for the under-18s in the 2006–07 season and scored 11 goals. He ended the season as top scorer for the under-18s even though he had always played on the wing. He started the 2007–08 season well and quickly progressed to the reserve team.

Stoch himself stated that he was close to making his first-team debut and hoped to do so during the course of the 2007–08 season although he did not. Stoch finally made his first appearance as a substitute on 30 November 2008 against Arsenal at Stamford Bridge. He replaced Deco after 80 minutes. Chelsea lost the game 1–2. Stoch made his second appearance for the first-team, replacing Mikel John Obi in the 82nd minute of Chelsea's 2–1 comeback win over Stoke City, playing a major part in the lead-up to their second goal. Stoch again came on for Mikel against Watford in the FA Cup fifth round with Chelsea 1–0 down with 20 minutes. The game finished 3–1 to Chelsea.

=== Twente ===
On 16 July 2009, Twente signed Stoch on a one-year loan from Chelsea. Stoch made his first Eredivisie appearance against Sparta Rotterdam in August 2009, assisting the second goal in a 2–0 win for his club. He scored both goals in the 2–0 win over Heerenveen on 20 September 2009. Stoch then scored an impressive opening goal from long-distance, in the 4–0 win against Groningen on 25 October 2009. Stoch continued his impressive scoring record for Twente by scoring and getting an assist in the 2–1 win over Roda on 31 October 2009. In De Grolsch Veste league game against NAC Breda, which Twente won 3–1, Stoch scored two goals to propel the team to victory, after Twente fell behind by a goal. On 2 May 2010, he made the winning goal against NAC Breda, Twente won the match 2–0 in an away game which made Twente the champion of the Eredivisie for the first time. Stoch ended the season with 10 league goals (12 in all competitions), having started almost every competitive match for Twente.

=== Fenerbahçe ===
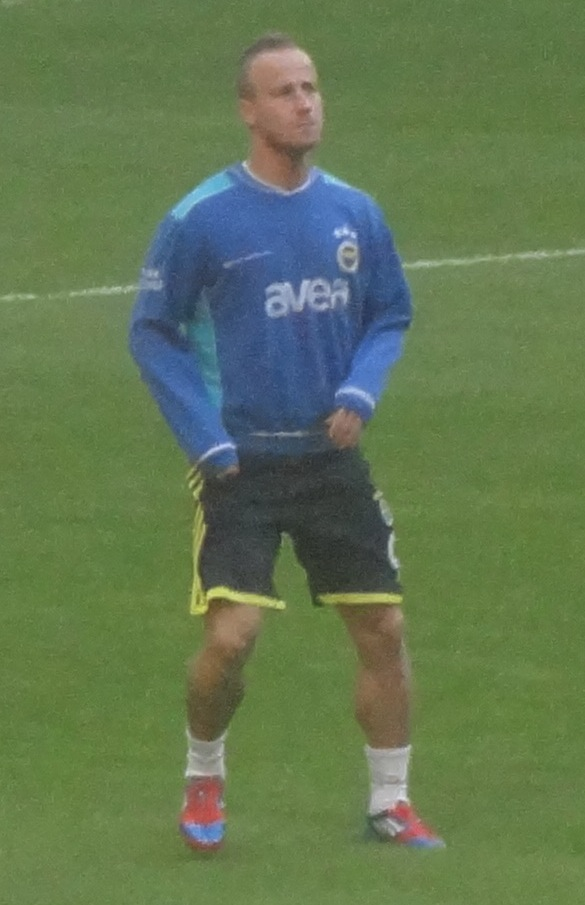
Stoch during the training with Fenerbahçe

Stoch joined Turkish team Fenerbahçe on 11 June 2010 on a four-year deal for a fee of €5.5 million. On 28 July 2010, he scored his debut goal for the club in a Champions League match against Young Boys in the third qualifying round and Fenerbahçe draw the match with score 2–2 at Stade de Suisse in Bern. Fenerbahçe won the Süper Lig title in 2010–11, for a record 18th time, with Stoch contributing two goals. Fenerbahçe gave Stoch a two-year contract extension in 2012. Stoch is contracted to the club until 2015–16, making €1.75 million and €15000 per match in 2012–13. He would earn €1.75 million in addition to €16000 per game in 2013–14, €1.8 million plus €16000 per match in 2014–15 and €1.9 million as well as €17000 per game in 2015–16. He won the 2012 FIFA Puskás Award after scoring a volley from outside the penalty area against Gençlerbirliği during a 2011–12 Süper Lig match, beating Falcao and previous award winner Neymar.

=== Loans to PAOK, Al Ain and Bursaspor ===
In August 2013 Stoch joined PAOK after Fenerbahçe and PAOK came to an agreement for a one-year loan for €1 million. He scored his first goal with the club in the first leg of the Champions League play-off qualifying round against FC Schalke 04. The match ended 1–1. On 3 July 2014, he signed new contract with Fenerbahçe until 2018 and then joined Al Ain on a one-year loan deal for €1 million. On 22 August 2015, Stoch joined Bursaspor on a one-year loan. In summer 2016, he returned to Fenerbahçe.

=== Slavia Prague ===
On 11 August 2017, Stoch joined Czech club Slavia Prague. He refused offers from Spain, France, Russia and wealthy clubs in the Near East. The main reason for this choice was Slavia's big chance of qualification into the Champions League group stage via upcoming play-off round against APOEL. Stoch played in both play-off matches but could not help his new club to qualify to group stage. After the 0–2 loss in Cyprus and 0–0 draw at home, in which Stoch was subbed off after half-time because of injury, Slavia was eliminated from the Champions League and entered 2017–18 UEFA Europa League group stage. On 20 September 2017 after the 5–1 victory against Třinec in MOL Cup Stoch shouted, with Slavia fans, "Smrt Spartě" ("Death to Sparta") and was called before the Czech Football League's Disciplinary Commission.

He scored a goal as Slavia Prague won the 2017–18 Czech Cup final 3–1 against FK Jablonec on 9 May 2018.

On 21 November 2018, Stoch signed a new three-year contract with Slavia, keeping him at the club until June 2022. On 28 June 2019, Stoch was given permission by Slavia to fly to Greece to discuss a potential move to PAOK. The following day, Slavia confirmed that Stoch had moved to PAOK.

=== Return to PAOK ===
On 29 June 2019, PAOK officially announced the signing of Stoch on a three-year contract for a transfer fee estimated in the region of €1.5 million with an annual fee of €750,000 (plus bonuses).

On 3 August 2020, Stoch announced that he had tested positive for COVID-19, a day after PAOK had announced that a member of the first-team had been infected. Two weeks later, the club announced that Stoch's contract was terminated by mutual consent.

=== Zagłębie Lubin ===
On 1 February 2021 he joined Zagłębie Lubin. He was released at the end of his contract in June 2021.

=== Slovan Liberec ===
On 22 September 2021 he joined FC Slovan Liberec.

=== Motorlet Prague ===
On 17 September 2022 Stoch made his debut for Motorlet Prague in a 3–1 home win against Sokol Hostouň.

=== FC Nitra ===
Ahead of the 2026–27 season, Stoch signed a contract with FC Nitra and will therefore play in the third tier of Slovak football. He returned to the club after 18 years. He made his first appearance for FC Nitra's reserve team due to a lack of match fitness. He subsequently made his league debut for the first team, coming on as a substitute. In the second round of the Slovak Cup, he captained FC Nitra.

== International career ==
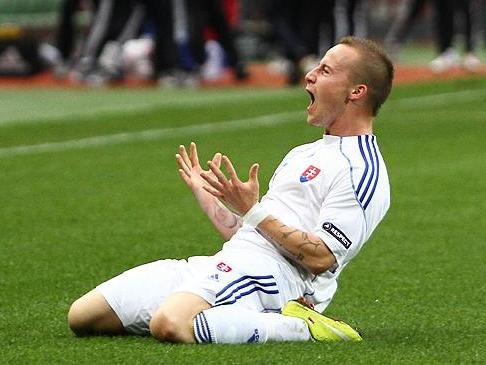
Stoch celebrating his winning goal against Russia on 7 September 2010

Stoch made his senior début for Slovakia on 10 February 2009 against Ukraine, where he came on in the 70th minute. His second appearance came just 24 hours later against Cyprus. He scored his first international goal for Slovakia against San Marino in a 2010 World Cup qualifier on 6 June 2009. Stoch was selected for the 2010 FIFA World Cup squad. On 7 September 2010, he scored the only goal of a Euro 2012 qualifying victory against Russia in Moscow. On 9 October 2014, Stoch scored the game-winning goal in the 2–1 UEFA Euro 2016 qualification win against title-holders Spain three minutes from time. Stoch became a part of a preliminary EURO 2016 squad and capped in a match against Germany, only days after death of his mother, due to which he had to be excused from a training camp in Austria in the previous week.

During the final tournament Stoch only appeared against Wales, where he came on in the 83rd minute. During the flight from France Stoch had a conflict with national team coach Ján Kozák. In August 2016, Kozák said that he can not imagine his continuation of cooperation with Stoch and he has not been nominated until Kozák's resignation in October 2018.

Stoch made his national team return in November 2018, when he was called up by its new coach Pavel Hapal for Nations League matches against Ukraine and Czech Republic.

== Style of play ==
Stoch bases his game on his two footballing idols Ronaldinho and Ronaldo and tries to emulate them on the pitch.

== Career statistics ==
=== Club ===
Appearances and goals by club, season and competition
Club	Season	League			National cup (Note: Includes FA Cup, KNVB Cup, Turkish Cup, Greek Cup, UAE President's Cup, Czech Cup, Polish Cup)		League cup (Note: Includes UAE League Cup)		Continental		Other		Total	
Club	Season	Division	Apps	Goals	Apps	Goals	Apps	Goals	Apps	Goals	Apps	Goals	Apps	Goals
Nitra	2005–06	Slovak Superliga	4	0	—		0	0	—		—		4	0
Chelsea	2008–09	Premier League	4	0	1	0	0	0	—		—		5	0
Twente (loan)	2009–10	Eredivisie	32	10	2	0	—		11 (Note: Two appearances in UEFA Champions League, nine appearances and two goals in UEFA Europa League)	2	—		45	12
Fenerbahçe	2010–11	Süper Lig	23	2	4	0	—		3 (Note: Two appearances and one goal in UEFA Champions League, one appearance in UEFA Europa League)	1	—		30	3
Fenerbahçe	2011–12	Süper Lig	33	12	4	0	—		—		—		37	12
Fenerbahçe	2012–13	Süper Lig	17	0	6	0	—		9 (Note: Three appearances in UEFA Champions League, six appearances in UEFA Europa League)	0	0	0	32	0
Fenerbahçe	2015–16	Süper Lig	0	0	0	0	—		2 (Note: Appearances in UEFA Champions League)	0	—		2	0
Fenerbahçe	2016–17	Süper Lig	9	0	6	1	—		6 (Note: Two appearances in UEFA Champions League, four appearances and four goals in UEFA Europa League)	4	—		21	5
Fenerbahçe	Total		82	14	20	1	—		20	5	—		122	20
PAOK (loan)	2013–14	Super League Greece	30	7	6	2	—		10 (Note: Two appearances and one goal in UEFA Champions League, eight appearances in UEFA Europa League)	1	—		46	10
Al Ain (loan)	2014–15	UAE Pro League	24	9	1	0	4	3	8 (Note: Appearances in AFC Champions League)	1	—		37	13
Bursaspor (loan)	2015–16	Süper Lig	25	1	3	1	—		—		—		28	2
Slavia Prague	2017–18	Czech First League	26	4	5	2	—		8 (Note: Two appearances in UEFA Champions League, six appearances in UEFA Europa League)	0	—		39	6
Slavia Prague	2018–19	Czech First League	33	12	2	0	—		14 (Note: Two appearances in UEFA Champions League, twelve appearances and two goals in UEFA Europa League)	2	—		49	14
Slavia Prague	Total		59	16	7	2	—|		22	2	—		88	20
PAOK	2019–20	Super League Greece	11	0	2	0	—		2 (Note: One appearance in UEFA Champions League, one appearance in UEFA Europa League)	0	—		15	0
Zagłębie Lubin	2020–21	Ekstraklasa	8	0	1	0	—		—		—		9	0
Slovan Liberec	2021–22	Czech First League	12	1	—		—		—		—		12	1
Motorlet Prague	2022–23	Bohemian Football League	20	8	0	0	—		—		—		20	8
Motorlet Prague	2023–24	Bohemian Football League	16	5	1	1	—		—		—		17	6
Motorlet Prague	Total		36	13	1	1	—		—		—		37	14
Career total			327	71	44	7	4	3	73	11	0	0	448	92

=== International ===
Appearances and goals by national team and year
National team	Year	Apps	Goals
Slovakia	2009	9	1
Slovakia	2010	13	2
Slovakia	2011	5	0
Slovakia	2012	8	1
Slovakia	2013	4	0
Slovakia	2014	9	1
Slovakia	2015	3	0
Slovakia	2016	4	1
Slovakia	2017	0	0
Slovakia	2018	2	0
Slovakia	2019	3	0
Total		60	6

Scores and results list Slovakia's goal tally first, score column indicates score after each Stoch goal.

List of international goals scored by Miroslav Stoch
No.	Date	Venue	Opponent	Score	Result	Competition
1	6 June 2009	Tehelné pole, Bratislava, Slovakia	San Marino	4–0	7–0	2010 FIFA World Cup qualification
2	11 August 2010	Štadión Pasienky, Bratislava, Slovakia	Croatia	1–1	1–1	Friendly
3	7 September 2010	Lokomotiv Stadium, Moscow, Russia	Russia	1–0	1–0	UEFA Euro 2012 qualifying
4	29 February 2012	Bursa Atatürk Stadium, Bursa, Turkey	Turkey	2–0	2–1	Friendly
5	9 October 2014	Štadión pod Dubňom, Žilina, Slovakia	Spain	2–1	2–1	UEFA Euro 2016 qualifying
6	29 March 2016	Aviva Stadium, Dublin, Ireland	Republic of Ireland	1–0	2–2	Friendly

== Honours ==
Twente

- Eredivisie: 2009–10

Fenerbahçe

- Süper Lig: 2010–11
- Turkish Cup: 2011–12, 2012–13

Al Ain

- UAE Pro-League: 2014–15

Slavia Prague

- Czech First League: 2018–19
- Czech Cup: 2017–18, 2018–19

Individual

- FIFA Puskás Award: 2012
- Peter Dubovský Award: 2009, 2010
