= Emmanuel Antwi =

Ghanaian professional footballer

Personal information
- Date of birth: 5 May 1996 (age 30)
- Place of birth: Tamale, Ghana
- Height: 1.70 m (5 ft 7 in)
- Position: Forward

Team information
- Current team: Příbram
- Number: 10

Youth career
- Liberty Professionals

Senior career*
Years	Team	Apps	(Gls)
2015–2016	Liberty Professionals	3	(0)
2015	→ Slovácko (loan)	0	(0)
2016–2017	Slavia Prague	0	(0)
2017	→ Sigma Olomouc (loan)	0	(0)
2017–	Příbram	180	(12)

International career
2015	Ghana U20	1	(0)
- * Club domestic league appearances and goals as of 28 May 2026

Emmanuel Antwi (born 5 May 1996) is a Ghanaian professional footballer who plays as a defender for Příbram.

== Club career ==
=== Liberty Professionals ===
Antwi's senior career began in Ghana with Liberty Professionals. In 2015, Slovácko loaned Antwi. However, he returned to Liberty Professionals months later following zero appearances; though was an unused substitute once, on 2 May for an away fixture to Viktoria Plzeň. After returning to his parent club, he subsequently made three appearances during the 2016 Ghanaian Premier League.

=== Slavia Prague ===
In September 2016, Czech First League side Slavia Prague purchased Antwi. He was soon sent out on loan, joining Sigma Olomouc in the following February. Like with Slovácko, he didn't make a first-team appearance for them.

=== Příbram ===
On 27 August 2017, Antwi signed a contract with Příbram of the Czech National Football League. He made his professional debut for the club on 29 October versus Baník Sokolov, which was the first of fifteen appearances throughout the 2017–18 campaign; a season that ended with promotion.

== International career ==
Antwi represented the Ghana U20 team during 2015. He was selected for the 2015 African U-20 Championship in Senegal, subsequently winning one cap against Mali in the third-place play-off. He was also chosen in Ghana's preliminary squad for the 2015 FIFA U-20 World Cup in New Zealand, but didn't make the final cut.

== Career statistics ==
As of 12 July 2020.

Club statistics
Club	Season	League			Cup		League Cup		Continental		Other		Total	
Club	Season	Division	Apps	Goals	Apps	Goals	Apps	Goals	Apps	Goals	Apps	Goals	Apps	Goals
Slovácko (loan)	2014–15	First League	0	0	0	0	—		—		0	0	0	0
Slavia Prague	2016–17	First League	0	0	0	0	—		0	0	0	0	0	0
Slavia Prague	Total		0	0	0	0	—		0	0	0	0	0	0
Sigma Olomouc (loan)	2016–17	Football League	0	0	0	0	—		—		0	0	0	0
Příbram	2017–18	Football League	15	0	0	0	—		—		0	0	15	0
Příbram	2018–19	First League	29	1	2	0	—		—		2	0	33	1
Příbram	2019–20	First League	15	1	0	0	—		—		0	0	15	1
Příbram	Total		59	2	2	0	—		0	0	2	0	63	2
Career total			59	2	2	0	—		0	0	2	0	63	2
