= David Gáč =

Czech footballer (born 1999)

Personal information
- Full name: David Gáč
- Date of birth: 23 January 1998 (age 28)
- Height: 1.92 m (6 ft 4 in)
- Position: Centre back

Youth career
- 2004−2016: RAFK Rajhrad
- 2016−2017: Zbrojovka Brno

Senior career*
Years	Team	Apps	(Gls)
2017−2019	Zbrojovka Brno	4	(0)
2018	→ Frýdek-Místek (loan)	11	(0)
2019	→ Fotbal Třinec (loan)	4	(1)
2019−	Fotbal Třinec	42	(2)
2021	→ Senica (loan)	15	(0)
- * Club domestic league appearances and goals as of 25 November 2021 (UTC)

David Gáč (born 20 April 1999) is a retired Czech footballer who played as a centre back.

== Club career ==
=== FC Zbrojovka Brno ===
He made his professional debut for Zbrojovka Brno in the away match against Mladá Boleslav on 10 September 2017, which ended in a loss 0:3.
