= Ibrahim Traoré (footballer) =

Ivorian footballer and scout (born 1988)

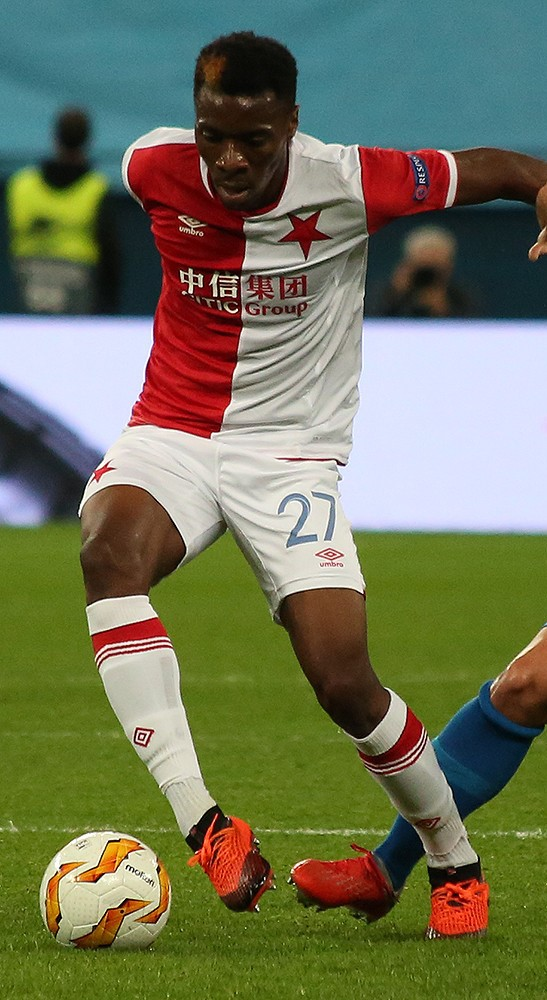
- Traoré with Slavia Prague in 2018

Personal information
- Full name: Ibrahim Benjamin Traoré
- Date of birth: 16 September 1988 (age 38)
- Place of birth: Abidjan, Ivory Coast
- Height: 1.87 m (6 ft 2 in)
- Position: Midfielder

Senior career*
Years	Team	Apps	(Gls)
2008–2010	CO Korhogo	?	(?)
2011–2013	AS Tanda	?	(?)
2013–2014	Al-Ahly Benghazi	?	(?)
2014–2016	Táborsko	48	(9)
2016–2019	Zlín	52	(2)
2018	→ Slavia Prague (loan)	7	(0)
2019–2023	Slavia Prague	100	(10)
2023–2024	Viktoria Plzeň	32	(2)

International career
2019	Ivory Coast	1	(0)
- * Club domestic league appearances and goals

Ibrahim Benjamin Traoré (born 16 September 1988) is an Ivorian retired professional footballer who played as a midfielder. After his active career, he started to work as a scout.

== Club career ==
Traoré began his career with Ivorian clubs CO Korhogo and AS Tanda, before signing for Al-Ahly Benghazi of the Libyan Premier League in 2013. In 2014, he moved to Táborsko in the Czech National Football League, the second tier of football in the Czech Republic. After a break-out season in the 2015–16 Czech National Football League, he moved to the top league side Zlín in September 2016.

On 3 September 2018, Slavia Prague announced that they had signed Traoré on loan, with an obligation to buy.

In January 2019, Traoré signed a contract with Slavia Prague for an undisclosed fee.

In June 2023, Traoré signed a one-year contract with Viktoria Plzeň for an undisclosed fee.

== International career ==
In November 2019, he received his first international call up from the Ivory Coast national team, aged 31.

== After the active career ==
In March 2025, his former club Slavia Prague revealed that Traoré works as a scout and the club cooperates with him.

== Career statistics ==
As of 25 June 2023

Club	Season	League			Cup		Continental		Other		Total	
Club	Season	Division	Apps	Goals	Apps	Goals	Apps	Goals	Apps	Goals	Apps	Goals
Táborsko	2013–14	Czech National Football League	4	0	0	0	—		—		4	0
Táborsko	2014–15	Czech National Football League	22	4	2	1	—		—		24	5
Táborsko	2015–16	Czech National Football League	18	3	2	0	—		—		20	3
Táborsko	2016–17	Czech National Football League	4	2	1	0	—		—		5	2
Táborsko	Total		48	9	5	1	—		—		53	10
Zlín	2016–17	Czech First League	23	0	5	0	—		—		28	0
Zlín	2017–18	Czech First League	22	2	3	0	6	0	1	0	32	2
Zlín	2018–19	Czech First League	7	0	0	0	—		—		7	0
Zlín	Total		52	2	8	0	6	0	1	0	67	2
Slavia Prague (loan)	2018–19	Czech First League	7	0	2	0	6	0	—		15	0
Slavia Prague	2018–19	Czech First League	9	2	3	0	5	1	—		17	3
Slavia Prague	2019–20	Czech First League	25	3	1	0	6	0	1	0	33	3
Slavia Prague	2020–21	Czech First League	25	0	5	1	9	0	—		39	1
Slavia Prague	2021–22	Czech First League	29	4	3	1	16	4	—		48	9
Slavia Prague	2022–23	Czech First League	12	1	2	0	10	1	—		24	2
Slavia Prague	Total		100	10	14	2	46	6	1	0	161	18
Career total			207	19	29	3	58	6	2	0	296	30
