= Pavel Vyhnal =

Czech footballer

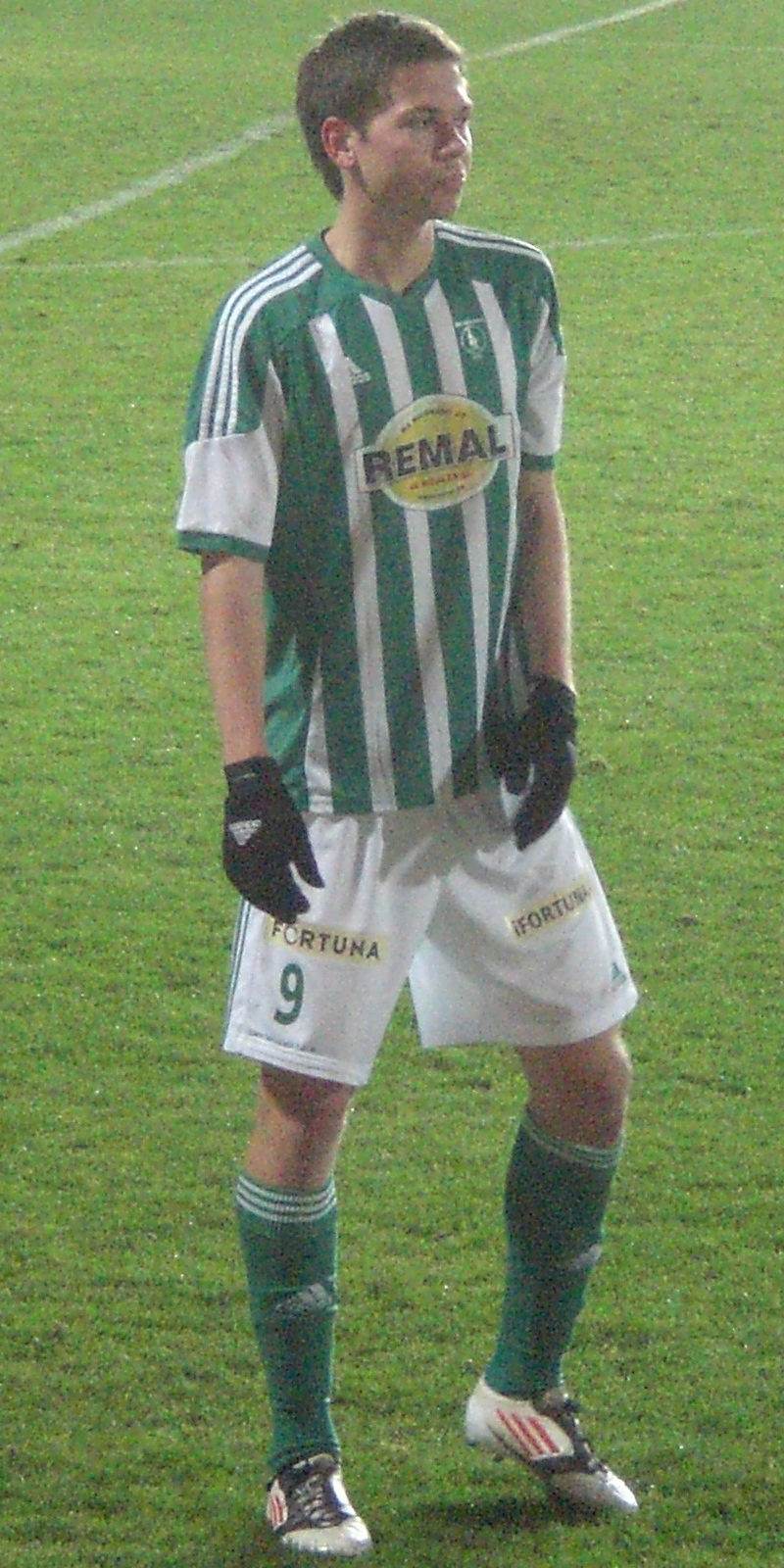

Personal information
- Full name: Pavel Vyhnal
- Date of birth: 25 May 1990 (age 36)
- Place of birth: Prague, Czechoslovakia
- Height: 1.88 m (6 ft 2 in)
- Position: Forward

Youth career
- Slavia Prague

Senior career*
Years	Team	Apps	(Gls)
2010–2015	Slavia Prague	8	(0)
2011	→ Táborsko (loan)	7	(2)
2012	→ Bohemians 1905 (loan)	18	(5)
2013	→ Vlašim (loan)	5	(2)
2016	Slavoj Vyšehrad	11	(1)
2016–2017	Vlašim	37	(26)
2018–2020	Fastav Zlín	20	(5)
2019	→ Teplice (loan)	14	(0)
- * Club domestic league appearances and goals

Pavel Vyhnal (born 25 May 1990) is a retired Czech footballer.
