= Daniel Trubač =

Czech footballer

Personal information
- Date of birth: 17 July 1997 (age 29)
- Place of birth: Opočno, Czech Republic
- Height: 1.75 m (5 ft 9 in)
- Position: Attacking midfielder

Team information
- Current team: Hradec Králové
- Number: 27

Youth career
- Hradec Králové

Senior career*
Years	Team	Apps	(Gls)
2014–2017	Hradec Králové	60	(3)
2017–2019	Slavia Prague	0	(0)
2017–2019	→ Teplice (loan)	38	(1)
2019–2026	Teplice	196	(22)
2026–	Hradec Králové	14	(0)

International career^{‡}
2013	Czech Republic U16	11	(1)
2013–2014	Czech Republic U17	15	(0)
2014	Czech Republic U18	6	(0)
2014–2016	Czech Republic U19	21	(1)
2017–	Czech Republic U20	2	(0)
2017–	Czech Republic U21	5	(0)
- * Club domestic league appearances and goals as of 27 May 2026 ‡ National team caps and goals as of 21 November 2017

Daniel Trubač (born 17 July 1997) is a Czech professional footballer who plays as a midfielder for Hradec Králové in the Czech First League.

He made his senior league debut for Hradec Králové on 17 August 2014 in a Czech First League 4–0 loss at Plzeň. He scored his first goal on 9 May 2015 in Hradec Králové's Czech First League 1–0 home win against Ostrava. After Hradec's relegation to the National Football League at the end of the 2016–17 season, Trubač joined Slavia Prague for an undisclosed fee and immediately went on a season-long loan to Teplice.

In February 2019, he signed a contract with Teplice.

On 14 January 2026, Trubač signed a contract with Hradec Králové.
