= Lukáš Pokorný =

Czech footballer (born 1993)

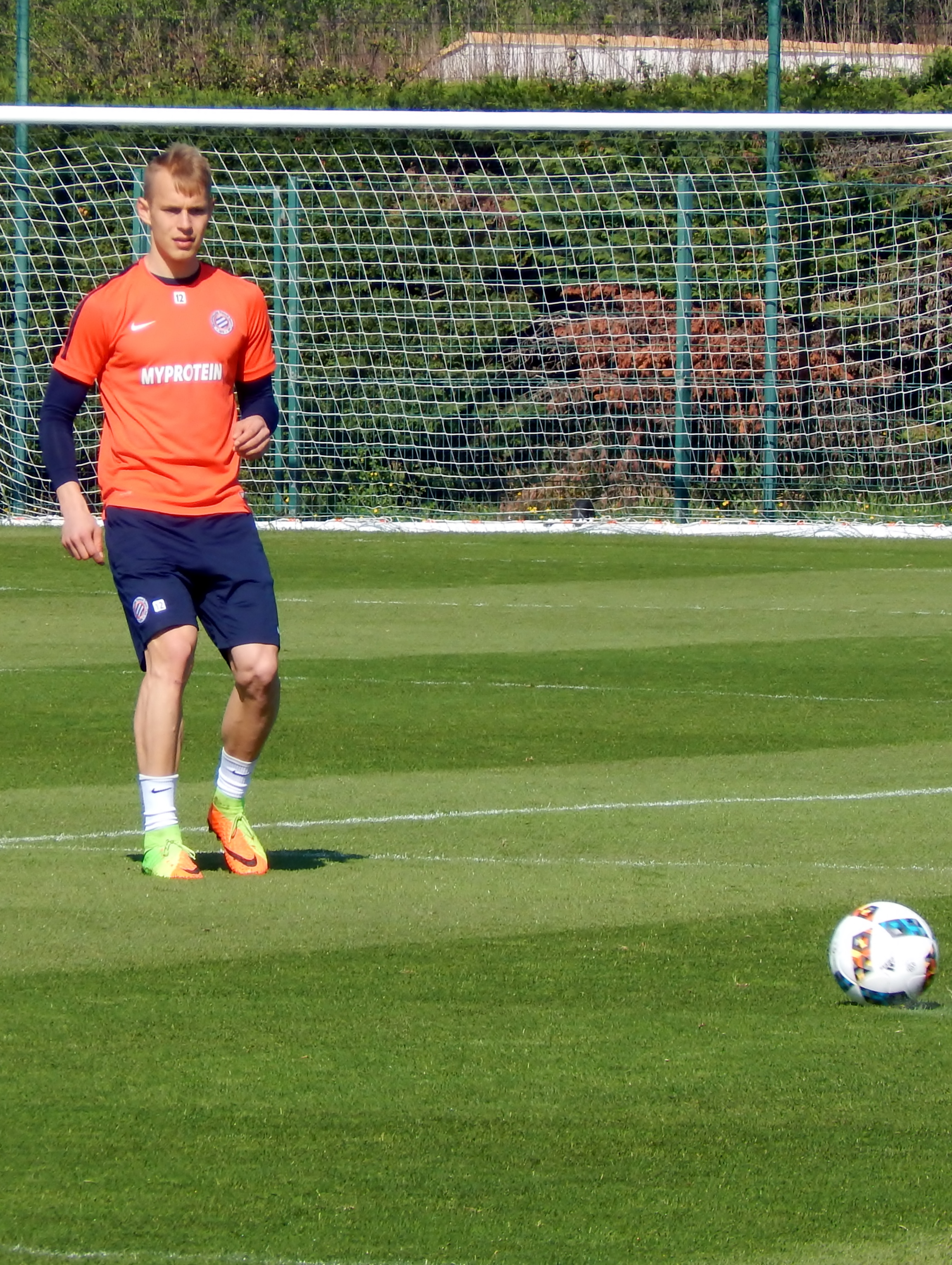
- Pokorný with Montpellier in 2017

Personal information
- Date of birth: 5 July 1993 (age 33)
- Place of birth: Czech Republic
- Height: 1.90 m (6 ft 3 in)
- Position: Defender

Youth career
- Slovan Liberec

Senior career*
Years	Team	Apps	(Gls)
2013–2017	Slovan Liberec	60	(2)
2017–2018	Montpellier	13	(0)
2018–2021	Slavia Prague	5	(0)
2019–2021	→ Bohemians (loan)	26	(0)
Total		104	(2)

International career
2016	Czech Republic	1	(0)
- * Club domestic league appearances and goals

Lukáš Pokorný (born 5 July 1993) is a Czech former professional footballer who played as a defender.

== Club career ==
Pokorný began his career at Slovan Liberec, making his senior league debut on 2 March 2014 in a Fortuna liga 3–2 win at Jihlava and playing 60 league matches, scoring two goals.

He signed for Ligue 1 side Montpellier HSC in January 2017 for a reported fee of €1.5 million.

In January 2018, Pokorný returned to his native country, signing with Slavia Prague. The transfer fee was estimated as €800,000.

In January 2019, he joined Bohemians 1905 on loan until the end of the season.

Pokorný retired in November 2021, aged 28, due to recurring injury problems.

== International career ==
Pokorný made his senior international debut for Czech Republic on 31 October 2016 in a friendly match against Armenia.

== Career statistics ==
Appearances and goals by club, season and competition
Club	Season	League			Cup		Continental		Other		Total	
Club	Season	Division	Apps	Goals	Apps	Goals	Apps	Goals	Apps	Goals	Apps	Goals
Slovan Liberec	2013–14	Fortuna liga	5	0	0	0	0	0	—		5	0
Slovan Liberec	2014–15	Fortuna liga	19	1	5	0	0	0	—		24	1
Slovan Liberec	2015–16	Fortuna liga	28	1	4	0	8	1	1	0	41	2
Slovan Liberec	2016–17	Fortuna liga	8	0	0	0	6	0	—		14	0
Slovan Liberec	Total		60	2	9	0	14	1	1	0	84	3
Montpellier	2016–17	Ligue 1	13	0	—		—		—		13	0
Montpellier	2017–18	Ligue 1	0	0	0	0	—		0	0	0	0
Montpellier	Total		13	0	0	0	—		0	0	13	0
Slavia Prague	2017–18	Fortuna liga	3	0	1	0	—		—		4	0
Slavia Prague	2018–19	Fortuna liga	2	0	0	0	0	0	—		2	0
Slavia Prague	Total		5	0	1	0	0	0	0	0	6	0
Bohemians 1905 (loan)	2018–19	Fortuna liga	13	0	2	0	—		—		15	0
Bohemians 1905 (loan)	2019–20	Fortuna liga	12	0	1	0	—		—		13	0
Bohemians 1905 (loan)	2020–21	Fortuna liga	1	0	2	0	—		—		3	0
Bohemians 1905 (loan)	Total		26	0	5	0	0	0	0	0	31	0
Career total			104	2	15	0	14	1	1	0	134	3

== Honours ==
Slovan Liberec

- Czech Cup: 2014–15
