= Zdeněk Linhart =

Czech footballer

Personal information
- Date of birth: 5 March 1994 (age 32)
- Place of birth: České Budějovice, Czech Republic
- Height: 1.81 m (5 ft 11 in)
- Position: Forward

Team information
- Current team: FC MAS Táborsko (on loan from Slavia Prague)
- Number: 23

Youth career
- SK Čtyři Dvory
- České Budějovice

Senior career*
Years	Team	Apps	(Gls)
2011–2015	České Budějovice	38	(2)
2015–	Slavia Prague	0	(0)
2016	→ Táborsko (loan)	8	(5)
2016	→ Bohemians 1905 (loan)	0	(0)
2017	→ Příbram (loan)	10	(1)
2017	→ Sigma Olomouc (loan)	0	(0)
2018–	→ FC MAS Táborsko (loan)	1	(0)

International career
2011	Czech Republic U17	4	(0)
2012–2013	Czech Republic U19	6	(1)
2014	Czech Republic U20	5	(2)
2014–2016	Czech Republic U21	6	(0)
- * Club domestic league appearances and goals as of 20 March 2018

Zdeněk Linhart (born 5 March 1994) is a professional Czech football player currently playing for FC MAS Táborsko in the Czech First League, on loan from SK Slavia Prague.

Linhart started his football career at local club SK Čtyři Dvory before joining České Budějovice. He made his professional league debut in a 1–3 away loss against Mladá Boleslav on 27 November 2011. He was a frequent late substitute throughout the 2012–13 season, scoring his first league goal in a 2–3 away loss against Viktoria Plzeň.

He signed for Slavia Prague in December 2015 and was immediately sent on loan, first to Táborsko in the Czech National Football League (2nd tier) and then to Bohemians 1905 in the Czech First League. However, early into his Bohemians spell he suffered a knee injury and didn't appear in any league matches for the club.
