= 2021–22 SK Sigma Olomouc season =

SK Sigma Olomouc
2021–22 season
- Chairman: Josef Lébr
- Manager: Václav Jílek
- Stadium: Andrův stadion
- Czech First League: 7th
- Czech Cup: Pre-season
Home colours	Away colours	Third colours

The 2021–22 season is the 29th season in the existence of SK Sigma Olomouc and the club's 8th consecutive season in the top flight of Czech football. In addition to the domestic league, SK Sigma Olomouc are participating in this season's edition of the Czech Cup.

== Players ==
=== First-team squad ===
Note: Flags indicate national team as defined under FIFA eligibility rules; some limited exceptions apply. Players may hold more than one non-FIFA nationality.

No.	Pos.	Nation	Player
1	GK	CZE	Michal Reichl
4	DF	CZE	Roman Hubník
5	MF	CZE	Kryštof Daněk
6	MF	CZE	Jáchym Šíp
7	MF	CZE	Radim Breite
9	FW	CZE	Pavel Zifčák
10	FW	CZE	Jakub Yunis
11	MF	ESP	Pablo González
13	FW	CZE	Mojmír Chytil
15	DF	CZE	Ondřej Zmrzlý
16	FW	CZE	Martin Nešpor
19	DF	CZE	Radek Látal
21	DF	CZE	Michal Vepřek

No.	Pos.	Nation	Player
22	DF	MTQ	Florent Poulolo
23	MF	CZE	Tomáš Zahradníček
25	DF	CZE	Martin Hála
29	MF	CZE	Patrik Slaměna
32	DF	CZE	Vít Beneš
33	GK	SVK	Matúš Macík
34	MF	SVK	Lukáš Greššák
—	GK	CZE	Jan Stejskal (on loan from Slavia Prague)
—	DF	CZE	Václav Jemelka
—	DF	SVK	Juraj Chvátal
—	MF	CZE	Jan Sedlák
—	FW	CZE	David Vaněček
—	FW	CZE	Antonín Růsek

=== Out on loan ===
Note: Flags indicate national team as defined under FIFA eligibility rules; some limited exceptions apply. Players may hold more than one non-FIFA nationality.

No.	Pos.	Nation	Player
—	DF	CZE	Jan Štěrba (at Zbrojovka Brno)

== Pre-season and friendlies ==
Win Draw Loss Fixtures

== Competitions ==
=== Overall record ===
Competition	First match	Last match	Starting round	Final position	Record							
Competition	First match	Last match	Starting round	Final position	Pld	W	D	L	GF	GA	GD	Win %
Czech First League	24 July 2021	20 April 2022	Matchday 1	9th	30	9	10	11	39	37	+2	30.00
Czech First League play-off	24 April 2022	13 May 2022	First round	Runners-up	4	2	1	1	6	4	+2	50.00
Czech Cup	25 August 2021	9 February 2022	Second round	Quarter-finals	4	2	2	0	7	4	+3	50.00
Total					38	13	13	12	52	45	+7	34.21

Last updated: 31 July 2021
Source: Soccerway

=== Czech First League ===
==== League table ====
Pos	Team	Pld	W	D	L	GF	GA	GD	Pts	Qualification or relegation
7	Mladá Boleslav	30	11	5	14	45	48	−3	38	Qualification for the play-off
8	Slovan Liberec	30	10	7	13	29	38	−9	37	Qualification for the play-off
9	Sigma Olomouc	30	9	10	11	39	37	+2	37	Qualification for the play-off
10	České Budějovice	30	9	9	12	40	46	−6	36	Qualification for the play-off
11	Fastav Zlín	30	8	6	16	36	53	−17	30	Qualification for the relegation group

Source: Fortuna Liga
Rules for classification: 1) Points; 2) Head-to-head points; 3) Head-to-head goal difference; 4) Head-to-head goals scored; 5) Goal difference; 6) Goals scored; 7) Fair-play ranking; 8) Draw.

==== Results summary ====
Overall								Home						Away					
Pld	W	D	L	GF	GA	GD	Pts	W	D	L	GF	GA	GD	W	D	L	GF	GA	GD
30	9	10	11	39	37	+2	37	6	7	2	22	15	+7	3	3	9	17	22	−5

Source: Fortuna Liga

==== Results by round ====
Round	1	2	3	4	5	6	7	8	9	10	11	12	13	14	15	16	17	18	19	20	21	22	23	24	25	26	27	28	29	30
Ground	H	H	A																											
Result																														
Position																														

Updated to match(es) played on 31 July 2021. Source: Fortuna Liga
A = Away; H = Home; W = Win; D = Draw; L = Loss

==== Matches ====
24 July 2021 1	Sparta Prague	3–2	Sigma Olomouc	Prague
19:00 CEST (UTC+2)	Štetina (yellow card) 8'; Karlsson 12' (pen.), (yellow card) 57'; Wiesner (yellow card) 66'; Krejčí II 64'; Hubník 78' (o.g.); Pavelka (yellow card) 85'; Niță (yellow card) 90+4'	Report	Daněk 3'; Sedlák (yellow card) 85'; Vaněček (yellow card) 85'; González 90+2'	Stadium: Generali Arena; Attendance: 7,235; Referee: Pavel Orel

31 July 2021 2	Sigma Olomouc	3–2	Pardubice	Olomouc
16:00 CEST (UTC+2)	Vepřek 8'; Zifčák 45'; Hála 52'	Report	Toml 20'; Solil 77'	Stadium: Andrův stadion Attendance: 2,465; Referee: Tomáš Klíma

14 August 2021 4	Sigma Olomouc	3–3	České Budějovice	Olomouc
14:00 CEST (UTC+2)	Jemelka 52'; Zifčák 86'; Poulolo 90+7'	Report	Bassey 9'; Čavoš 41'; Tolno 61'	Stadium: Andrův stadion Attendance: 2,619; Referee: Dalibor Černý

21 August 2021 5	Fastav Zlín	1–4	Sigma Olomouc	Zlín
16:00 CEST (UTC+2)	Procházka (yellow card) 39'; Hrubý 56'; Condé (yellow card) 62'; Hlinka (yellow card) 85'	Report	Zifčák 34'; Breite (yellow card) 44'; Daněk 51'; Hála 79'; Vaněček 85'	Stadium: Letná Stadion; Attendance: 2,843; Referee: Pavel Julínek

29 August 2021 6	Sigma Olomouc	4–0	Jablonec	Olomouc
16:00 CEST (UTC+2)	González 4'; Zmrzlý 58'; Hála 73', 79'	Report		Stadium: Andrův stadion Attendance: 3,005; Referee: Ondřej Berka

12 September 2021 7	Mladá Boleslav	3–3	Sigma Olomouc	Mladá Boleslav
16:00 CEST (UTC+2)	Škoda 24', (yellow card) 45+1'; Douděra (yellow card) 64'; Macík 86' (o.g.); Karafiát 90'	Report	Hála 10'; Růsek 23'; Chvátal (yellow card) 24'; González (yellow card) 32'; Jemelka (yellow card) 59'; Vaněček 73'; Macík (yellow card) 80'	Stadium: Lokotrans Aréna; Attendance: 2,832; Referee: Jan Machálek

17 September 2021 8	Sigma Olomouc	1–1	Baník Ostrava	Olomouc
19:00 CEST (UTC+2)	Hála 10'; Breite (yellow card) 39'; Sedlák (yellow card) 63'; Pablo González (yellow card) 72'; Zifčák (red card) 74'	Report	Sor (yellow card) 23'; Ndefe (yellow card) 32'; Tetour (yellow card) 39'; Almási 84'	Stadium: Andrův stadion Attendance: 8,613; Referee: Tomáš Klíma

26 September 2021 9	Teplice	0–0	Sigma Olomouc	Teplice
16:00 CEST (UTC+2)	Fortelný (yellow card) 21'; Laňka (yellow card) 76'	Report	González (yellow card) 35'; Breite (yellow card) 59'	Stadium: Na Stínadlech; Attendance: 2,120; Referee: Ondrej Pechanec

2 October 2021 10	Bohemians 1905	2–0	Sigma Olomouc	Prague
16:00 CEST (UTC+2)	Köstl 23'; Chramosta 25'	Report		Stadium: Ďolíček; Attendance: 3,553; Referee: Ladislav Szikszay

17 October 2021 11	Sigma Olomouc	2–0	Karviná	Olomouc
16:00 CEST (UTC+2)	Růsek 7'; González 53' (pen.)	Report		Stadium: Andrův stadion Attendance: 2,959; Referee: Petr Hocek

23 October 2021 12	Slovan Liberec	2–0	Sigma Olomouc	Liberec
16:00 CEST (UTC+2)	Frýdek 15'; Koscelník (yellow card) 51'; Helal 57' (pen.)	Report	Jemelka (yellow card) 36'	Stadium: Stadion u Nisy; Attendance: 2,295; Referee: Tomáš Batík

27 October 2021 3	Slavia Prague	1–0	Sigma Olomouc	Prague
19:00 CEST (UTC+2)	Olayinka 5'; Hromada (yellow card) 51'; Mandous (yellow card) 90+4'	Report	Jemelka (yellow card) 34'; Hála (yellow card) 90'	Stadium: Sinobo Stadium; Attendance: 11,368; Referee: Ladislav Szikszay
Note: The match was originally scheduled for 5 August 2021, but was postponed due to Slavia Prague's participation in European competition.

30 October 2021 13	Sigma Olomouc	0–3	Slovácko	Olomouc
18:00 CEST (UTC+2)		Report	Reinberk 71'; Cicilia 80'; Holzer 90+3'	Stadium: Andrův stadion Attendance: 3,047; Referee: Jan Petřík

6 November 2021 14	Viktoria Plzeň	0–0	Sigma Olomouc	Plzeň
18:00 CET (UTC+1)	Kaša (yellow card) 53' (yellow-red card) 57'; Kalvach (yellow card) 87'; Beauguel (yellow card) 90+1'	Report	Hubník (red card) 45'; Poulolo (yellow card) 8'; Macík (yellow card) 90+4'	Stadium: Doosan Arena; Attendance: 5,015; Referee: Ondřej Ginzel

20 November 2021 15	Sigma Olomouc	2–2	Hradec Králové	Olomouc
15:00 CET (UTC+1)	Růsek 28'; Breite 47'	Report	Rada 64' (pen.); Vlkanova 76'	Stadium: Andrův stadion Attendance: 3,167; Referee: Ondrej Pechanec

27 November 2021 16	Pardubice	1–5	Sigma Olomouc	Prague (Note: Pardubice continued playing their home matches in Ďolíček due to the rebuilding of their own stadium Pod Vinicí.)
15:00 CET (UTC+1)	Tischler 16'	Report	Růsek 13'; Zmrzlý 23'; Poulolo 49'; González 68'; Látal 79'	Stadium: Ďolíček; Attendance: 458; Referee: Dalibor Černý

4 December 2021 17	Sigma Olomouc	0–1	Slavia Prague	Olomouc
18:00 CET (UTC+1)	Hubník (yellow card) 52'; Greššák (yellow card) 71'	Report	Kuchta 56'; Kacharaba (yellow card) 89'; Mandous (yellow card) 90+5'; Krmenčík (yellow card) 90+7'	Stadium: Andrův stadion Attendance: 1,000; Referee: Miroslav Zelinka

12 December 2021 18	České Budějovice	2–1	Sigma Olomouc	České Budějovice
15:00 CET (UTC+1)	Bassey 35'; Čolić 87' (pen.)	Report	González 57'	Stadium: Stadion Střelecký ostrov Attendance: 903; Referee: Josef Krejsa

19 December 2021 19	Sigma Olomouc	1–1	Fastav Zlín	Olomouc
15:00 CET (UTC+1)	Růsek 25'; Zmrzlý (yellow card) 64'	Report	Fantiš 63'; Procházka (yellow card) 67'	Stadium: Andrův stadion Attendance: 1,000; Referee: Pavel Orel

5 February 2022 20	Jablonec	1–0	Sigma Olomouc	Jablonec nad Nisou
15:00 CET (UTC+1)	Kratochvíl 49'	Report		Stadium: Stadion Střelnice; Attendance: 755; Referee: Petr Hocek

13 February 2022 21	Sigma Olomouc	2–1	Mladá Boleslav	Olomouc
15:00 CET (UTC+1)	Greššák (yellow card) 21'; González (yellow card) 54'; Chytil 64'; Zmrzlý 79'	Report	Suchý (yellow card) 43'; Matějovský 47'; Stránský (yellow card) 80'	Stadium: Andrův stadion Attendance: 1,000; Referee: Jan Machálek

19 February 2022 22	Baník Ostrava	1–0	Sigma Olomouc	Ostrava
15:00 CET (UTC+1)	Pokorný 81'	Report		Stadium: Městský stadion Attendance: 6,151; Referee: Tomáš Batík

27 February 2022 23	Sigma Olomouc	0–0	Teplice	Olomouc
15:00 CEST (UTC+2)	Navrátil (yellow card) 77'	Report	Kučera (yellow card) 38'; Žák (yellow card) 73'; Fortelný (yellow card) 77'	Stadium: Andrův stadion Attendance: 2,419; Referee: Dalibor Černý

5 March 2022 24	Sigma Olomouc	0–0	Bohemians 1905	Olomouc
15:00 CET (UTC+1)		Report		Stadium: Andrův stadion Attendance: 2,678; Referee: Ondřej Berka

13 March 2022 25	Karviná	1–2	Sigma Olomouc	Karviná
15:00 CET (UTC+1)	Papadopulos 51'	Report	Greššák 5'; Navrátil 58'	Stadium: Městský stadion Attendance: 1,620; Referee: Zbyněk Proske

20 March 2022 26	Sigma Olomouc	1–0	Slovan Liberec	Olomouc
15:00 CEST (UTC+2)	Navrátil 25'; Růsek (yellow card) 75'; Macík (yellow card) 90+3'; Beneš (yellow card) 90+4'; Daněk (yellow card) 90+5'; Jílek (not on pitch) (yellow card) 90+6'	Report	Pourzitidis (yellow card) 59'	Stadium: Andrův stadion Attendance: 3,111; Referee: Pavel Orel

2 April 2022 27	Slovácko	1–0	Sigma Olomouc	Uherské Hradiště
16:00 CEST (UTC+2)	Havlík 65'	Report		Stadium: Městský fotbalový stadion Miroslava Valenty; Attendance: 3,649; Referee: Jan Petřík

9 April 2022 28	Sigma Olomouc	1–1	Viktoria Plzeň	Olomouc
16:00 CEST (UTC+2)	Růsek (yellow card) 34' (goal) 66'; Chvátal (yellow card) 90+4'	Report	Beauguel 57'; Kopic (yellow card) 69'; Čermák (yellow card) 75'	Stadium: Andrův stadion Attendance: 4,078; Referee: Petr Hocek

17 April 2022 29	Hradec Králové	3–0	Sigma Olomouc	Mladá Boleslav (Note: Hradec Králové played their home matches in Mladá Boleslav due to the rebuilding of their own Všesportovní stadion.)
17:00 CEST (UTC+2)	Mejdr 38'; Vašulín 60', 78'	Report		Stadium: Lokotrans Aréna; Attendance: 670; Referee: Dalibor Černý

20 April 2022 30	Sigma Olomouc	2–0	Sparta Prague	Olomouc
18:00 CEST (UTC+2)	Breite 7'; Beneš 11'	Report	Pešek (yellow card) 68'	Stadium: Andrův stadion Attendance: 9,157; Referee: Tomáš Klíma

==== Play-off ====
===== First round =====
24 April 2022 First leg	Sigma Olomouc	1–0	Slovan Liberec	Olomouc
16:00 CEST (UTC+2)	Chytil 17'	Report		Stadium: Andrův stadion Attendance: 2,237; Referee: Jan Petřík

30 April 2022 Second leg	Slovan Liberec	0–2 (0–3 agg.)	Sigma Olomouc	Liberec
16:00 CEST (UTC+2)		Report	Zmrzlý 28'; Růsek 65'	Stadium: Stadion u Nisy; Attendance: 1,428; Referee: Dominik Starý
Note: Sigma Olomouc won 3–0 on aggregate.

===== Second round =====
6 May 2022 First leg	Sigma Olomouc	1–2	Mladá Boleslav	Olomouc
17:00 CEST (UTC+2)	Zifčák 70'	Report	Pech 45+2'; Hlavatý 55'	Stadium: Andrův stadion Attendance: 2,750; Referee: Josef Krejsa

13 May 2022 Second leg	Mladá Boleslav	2–2 (4–3 agg.)	Sigma Olomouc	Mladá Boleslav
17:00 CEST (UTC+2)	Jemelka 40' (o.g.); Ewerton 85'	Report	Zmrzlý 19'; Chytil 73'	Stadium: Lokotrans Aréna; Attendance: 1,430; Referee: Pavel Orel
Note: Mladá Boleslav won 4–3 on aggregate.

=== Czech Cup ===
25 August 2021 Second round	Uničov	2–4	Sigma Olomouc	Uničov
17:00 CEST (UTC+2)	A. Krč 23'; J. Svoboda 85'	Report	Zifčák 5', 30'; Zmrzlý 17'; Růsek 72'	Stadium: Areál SK Uničov

21 September 2021 Third round	Sellier & Bellot Vlašim	1–2	Sigma Olomouc	Vlašim
16:00 CEST (UTC+2)	Broukal 66'	Report	Zmrzlý 6'; Daněk 79'	Stadium: Stadion Kollárova ulice Referee: Pavel Orel

23 November 2021 Fourth round	České Budějovice	1–1 (a.e.t.) (4–5 p)	Sigma Olomouc	České Budějovice
16:00 CET (UTC+1)	Brandner 9'	Report	Růsek 60'	Stadium: Stadion Střelecký ostrov Referee: Jan Machálek
Note: Sigma Olomouc won on penalty kicks 5–4.

9 February 2022 Quarter-finals	Sigma Olomouc	0–0 (a.e.t.) (2–4 p)	Slovácko	Olomouc
14:30 CET (UTC+1)		Report		Stadium: Andrův stadion Referee: Dalibor Černý
Note: Slovácko won on penalty kicks 4–2.
