= 2023–24 SK Sigma Olomouc season =

SK Sigma Olomouc
2023–24 season
- Manager: Václav Jílek
- Stadium: Andrův stadion
- Czech First League: Ongoing
- Czech Cup: Fourth round
- Average home league attendance: 4,601
- All statistics correct as of August 2023.

The 2023–24 season is SK Sigma Olomouc's 16th season in existence and seventh consecutive in the Czech First League. They will also compete in the Czech Cup.

== Players ==
=== First-team squad ===
As of 3 November 2023

Note: Flags indicate national team as defined under FIFA eligibility rules; some limited exceptions apply. Players may hold more than one non-FIFA nationality.

No.	Pos.	Nation	Player
1	GK	SVK	Tomáš Digaňa
7	MF	CZE	Radim Breite
9	FW	CZE	Pavel Zifčák
10	MF	CZE	Filip Zorvan
11	FW	NGR	Yunusa Muritala
13	DF	CZE	Jiří Sláma
14	FW	CZE	Antonín Růsek
15	DF	CZE	Ondřej Zmrzlý
16	FW	CZE	Denis Kramář
17	MF	NGR	Dele Israel
19	DF	CZE	Lukáš Vraštil
20	DF	SVK	Juraj Chvátal
22	DF	CZE	František Matys
24	DF	CZE	Vojtěch Křišťál

No.	Pos.	Nation	Player
25	MF	SVK	Denis Ventúra
26	MF	CZE	Martin Pospíšil
29	GK	CZE	Tadeáš Stoppen
30	MF	CZE	Jan Navrátil
31	GK	CZE	Jakub Trefil
32	DF	CZE	Vít Beneš
33	GK	SVK	Matúš Macík
38	DF	CZE	Jakub Pokorný
39	FW	CZE	Lukáš Juliš
40	MF	CZE	Jan Fortelný (on loan from Sparta Prague)
44	MF	CZE	Jakub Přichystal
57	DF	CZE	Filip Novák
77	MF	CZE	Jan Vodháněl

=== Out on loan ===
Note: Flags indicate national team as defined under FIFA eligibility rules; some limited exceptions apply. Players may hold more than one non-FIFA nationality.

No.	Pos.	Nation	Player
—	MF	CZE	Jakub Matoušek (at Pardubice)

== Transfers ==
=== In ===
Pos.	Player	Transferred from	Fee	Date	Source

=== Out ===
Pos.	Player	Transferred to	Fee	Date	Source

== Pre-season and friendlies ==
Win Draw Loss Fixtures

7 July 2023 Friendly	Sigma Olomouc (Czech Republic)	2–1	(Slovakia) Trenčín

11 July 2023 Friendly	Rapid Vienna (Austria)	1–2	(Czech Republic) Sigma Olomouc

15 July 2023 Friendly	Mezőkövesd (Hungary)	1–2	(Czech Republic) Sigma Olomouc

31 January 2024 Friendly	Ludogorets Razgrad (Bulgaria)	3–1	(Czech Republic) Sigma Olomouc

3 February 2024 Friendly	Sigma Olomouc (Czech Republic)	1–1	(Denmark) Vejle

== Competitions ==
=== Overall record ===
Competition	First match	Last match	Starting round	Final position	Record							
Competition	First match	Last match	Starting round	Final position	Pld	W	D	L	GF	GA	GD	Win %
Czech First League	23 July 2023	27 April 2024	Matchday 1		20	8	5	7	28	25	+3	40.00
Czech Cup	30 August 2023	16 November 2023	Second round	Fourth round	3	2	0	1	6	4	+2	66.67
Total					23	10	5	8	34	29	+5	43.48

Last updated: 17 February 2024
Source: Soccerway

=== Czech First League ===
==== Regular season ====
===== Table =====
Pos	Team	Pld	W	D	L	GF	GA	GD	Pts	Qualification or relegation
6	Slovácko	30	11	8	11	39	40	−1	41	Qualification for the Championship group
7	Slovan Liberec	30	10	10	10	46	46	0	40	Qualification for the Play-off
8	Sigma Olomouc	30	10	7	13	40	45	−5	37	Qualification for the Play-off
9	Hradec Králové	30	9	10	11	32	38	−6	37	Qualification for the Play-off
10	Teplice	30	9	9	12	31	40	−9	36	Qualification for the Play-off

Source: Fortuna Liga
Rules for classification: 1) Points; 2) Head-to-head points; 3) Head-to-head goal difference; 4) Head-to-head goals scored; 5) Goal difference; 6) Goals scored; 7) Fair-play ranking; 8) Draw.

==== Results summary ====
Overall								Home						Away					
Pld	W	D	L	GF	GA	GD	Pts	W	D	L	GF	GA	GD	W	D	L	GF	GA	GD
30	10	7	13	40	45	−5	37	6	4	5	20	21	−1	4	3	8	20	24	−4

Source: Fortuna Liga

===== Results by round =====
Round	1	2	3	4	5	6	7	8	9	10	11	12	13	14	15	16	17	18	19	20	21	22	23	24	25	26	27	28	29	30
Ground	A	H	A	H	A	H	A	H	A	H	H	A	H	A	H	A	H	A	H	A	H	A	H	A	A	H	A	H	A	H
Result	L	W	W	W	L	W	W	W	L	L	W	D	D	D	L	W	D	L	L	L	D	L	D	W	L	L	L	W	D	L
Position	13	8	5	3	4	4	4	4	4	4	4	4	4	5	7	5	5	5	5	7	6	8	8	7	7	8	8	8	8	8

Source: Fortuna Liga
A = Away; H = Home; W = Win; D = Draw; L = Loss

===== Matches =====
The league fixtures were unveiled on 21 June 2023.

23 July 2023 1	Sparta Prague	2–0	Sigma Olomouc	Prague
18:00 CEST (UTC+2)	Haraslín 16', 55'	Report	Vraštil (yellow card) 5'; Pospíšil (yellow card) 9'	Stadium: epet ARENA; Attendance: 17,153; Referee: Ladislav Szikszay

29 July 2023 2	Sigma Olomouc	3–1	Karviná	Olomouc
15:00 CEST (UTC+2)	Juliš 15'; Zmrzlý 33'; Navrátil 66'	Report	Papalélé 44'	Stadium: Andrův stadion Attendance: 3,254; Referee: Dominik Starý

5 August 2023 3	Slovácko	0–2	Sigma Olomouc	Uherské Hradiště
15:00 CEST (UTC+2)		Report	Juliš 9'; Vodháněl 48'	Stadium: Městský fotbalový stadion Miroslava Valenty; Attendance: 4,942; Referee: Stanislav Volek

13 August 2023 4	Sigma Olomouc	2–1	Teplice	Olomouc
15:00 CEST (UTC+2)	Vodháněl 55'; Chaloupek 75' (o.g.)	Report	Krsmanovič 72'	Stadium: Andrův stadion Attendance: 3,588; Referee: Filip Kotala

20 August 2023 5	Viktoria Plzeň	2–1	Sigma Olomouc	Plzeň
15:00 CEST (UTC+2)	Hejda 45+1'; Bucha 45+3'	Report	Chvátal 27'	Stadium: Doosan Arena; Attendance: 9,114; Referee: Ondřej Berka

27 August 2023 6	Sigma Olomouc	2–0	Slovan Liberec	Olomouc
15:00 CEST (UTC+2)	Breite (yellow card) 45+2'; Juliš 54' (pen.); Pokorný 65'; Pospíšil (yellow card) 74'; Muritala (yellow card) 82'	Report	Doumbia (yellow card) 38'	Stadium: Andrův stadion Attendance: 3,594; Referee: Petr Hocek

3 September 2023 7	Hradec Králové	1–3	Sigma Olomouc	Hradec Králové
20:00 CEST (UTC+2)	Krejčí 13'	Report	Zmrzlý 41'; Vodháněl 76'; Juliš 90+5'	Stadium: Malšovická aréna Attendance: 9,150; Referee: Jan Petřík

16 September 2023 8	Sigma Olomouc	2–1	České Budějovice	Olomouc
15:00 CEST (UTC+2)	Juliš 33'; Navrátil 42'	Report	Skalák 20'	Stadium: Andrův stadion Attendance: 3 432; Referee: Stanislav Volek

23 September 2023 9	Bohemians 1905	3–2	Sigma Olomouc	Prague
18:00 CEST (UTC+2)	Prekop 36'; Puškáč 70'; Matoušek 77'	Report	Zorvan 8'; Vodháněl 44'	Stadium: Ďolíček; Attendance: 5,212; Referee: Ondřej Pechanec

30 September 2023 10	Sigma Olomouc	0–3	Baník Ostrava	Olomouc
15:00 CEST (UTC+2)		Report	Tanko 11'; Ewerton 29'; Buchta 78'	Stadium: Andrův stadion Attendance: 10,015; Referee: Ladislav Szikszay

7 October 2023 11	Sigma Olomouc	4–0	Mladá Boleslav	Olomouc
15:00 CEST (UTC+2)	Chvátal 26'; Zmrzlý 63'; Pokorný 66'; Beneš 89'	Report		Stadium: Andrův stadion Attendance: 2,939; Referee: Tomáš Klíma

21 October 2023 12	Pardubice	1–1	Sigma Olomouc	Pardubice
15:00 CEST (UTC+2)	Daněk 22' (pen.)	Report	Halinský 90+4' (o.g.)	Stadium: CFIG Arena; Attendance: 3,141; Referee: Karel Rouček

28 October 2023 13	Sigma Olomouc	0–0	Zlín	Olomouc
15:00 CEST (UTC+2)		Report		Stadium: Andrův stadion Attendance: 3,044; Referee: Michael Kvítek

4 November 2023 14	Jablonec	1–1	Sigma Olomouc	Jablonec nad Nisou
15:00 CET (UTC+1)	Štěpánek 5'; Kratochvíl (yellow card) 32'; Hurtado (yellow card) 70'	Report	Juliš 18'; Chvátal (yellow card) 52'; Vodháněl (yellow card) 52'	Stadium: Stadion Střelnice; Attendance: 2,387; Referee: Filip Kotala

12 November 2023 15	Sigma Olomouc	1–3	Slavia Prague	Olomouc
18:00 CET (UTC+1)	Pokorný 15'	Report	Wallem 4'; Tomič 43'; Jurečka 56'	Stadium: Andrův stadion Attendance: 8,897; Referee: Stanislav Volek

25 November 2023 16	Karviná	0–2	Sigma Olomouc	Karviná
15:00 CET (UTC+1)		Report	Juliš 7', 46'	Stadium: Městský stadion Attendance: 1,714; Referee: Tomáš Klíma

2 December 2023 17	Sigma Olomouc	1–1	Slovácko	Olomouc
15:00 CET (UTC+1)	Beneš 42'	Report	Daníček 59' (pen.)	Stadium: Andrův stadion Attendance: 2,228; Referee: Michael Kvítek

17 December 2023 19	Sigma Olomouc	1–3	Viktoria Plzeň	Olomouc
15:00 CET (UTC+1)	Ventúra 9'	Report	Šulc 10'; Dweh 45'; Vydra 90+5'	Stadium: Andrův stadion Attendance: 3,105; Referee: Vít Zaoral

10 February 2024 20	Slovan Liberec	2–0	Sigma Olomouc	Liberec
15:00 CET (UTC+1)	Penner 49'; Horský 80'	Report	Sláma (yellow card) 40'; Pospíšil (yellow card) 45+1'; Juliš (yellow card) 51'; Singhateh (yellow card) 84'	Stadium: Stadion u Nisy; Attendance: 2,427; Referee: Ondřej Berka

17 February 2024 21	Sigma Olomouc	0–0	Hradec Králové	Olomouc
15:00 CET (UTC+1)		Report		Stadium: Andrův stadion Attendance: 2,683; Referee: Dalibor Černý

21 February 2024 18	Teplice	2–0	Sigma Olomouc	Teplice
17:30 CET (UTC+1)	Bílek 22'; Yasser 88'	Report		Stadium: Na Stínadlech; Attendance: 3,047; Referee: Marek Radina

25 February 2024 22	České Budějovice	2–1	Sigma Olomouc	České Budějovice
15:00 CET (UTC+1)	Králik 52'; Ondrášek 63'	Report	Novák 85'	Stadium: Stadion Střelecký ostrov Attendance: 2,398; Referee: Filip Kotala

2 March 2024 23	Sigma Olomouc	2–2	Bohemians 1905	Olomouc
15:00 CET (UTC+1)	Fortelný 19'; Novák 22'	Report	Prekop 4'; Hála 41'	Stadium: Andrův stadion Attendance: 3,478; Referee: Petr Hocek

9 March 2024 24	Baník Ostrava	1–2	Sigma Olomouc	Ostrava
18:00 CET (UTC+1)	Ewerton 82'	Report	Juliš 20', 37' (pen.)	Stadium: Městský stadion Attendance: 9,751; Referee: Dominik Starý

16 March 2024 25	Mladá Boleslav	2–1	Sigma Olomouc	Mladá Boleslav
15:00 CET (UTC+1)	Ladra 8'; John 76'	Report	Juliš 59' (pen.)	Stadium: Lokotrans Aréna; Attendance: 2,228; Referee: Stanislav Volek

30 March 2024 26	Sigma Olomouc	0–2	Pardubice	Olomouc
15:00 CET (UTC+1)		Report	Macík 32' (o.g.); Zlatohlávek 90+1'	Stadium: Andrův stadion Attendance: 3,366; Referee: Ondřej Berka

6 April 2024 27	Zlín	3–2	Sigma Olomouc	Zlín
15:00 CEST (UTC+2)	Slončík 36', 66'; Černín 55'	Report	Singhateh 83' (pen.); Pospíšil 90+3'	Stadium: Letná Stadion; Attendance: 3,021; Referee: Ladislav Szikszay

14 April 2024 28	Sigma Olomouc	1–0	Jablonec	Olomouc
15:00 CEST (UTC+2)	Spáčil (red card) 28'; Vraštil (yellow card) 34'; Fortelný (yellow card) 45+3'; Chvátal 74'	Report	Černák (yellow card) 32'; Alégué (yellow card) 35'	Stadium: Andrův stadion Attendance: 3,036; Referee: Karel Rouček

21 April 2024 29	Slavia Prague	2–2	Sigma Olomouc	Prague
15:00 CEST (UTC+2)	Bořil 77'; Chytil 84'	Report	Pokorný 52'; Zifčák 66'	Stadium: Fortuna Arena; Attendance: 17,986; Referee: Marek Radina

28 April 2024 30	Sigma Olomouc	1–4	Sparta Prague	Olomouc
15:00 CEST (UTC+2)	Šíp 75'	Report	Krejčí 28' (pen.), 33'; Birmančević 53'; Kuchta 66'	Stadium: Andrův stadion Attendance: 12,359; Referee: Ondřej Pechanec

==== Play-off ====
===== First round =====
5 May 2024 First leg	Hradec Králové	3–1	Sigma Olomouc	Hradec Králové
15:00 CEST (UTC+2)	Chvátal 20' (o.g.); Vašulín 42'; Horák 44'	Report	Šíp 13'	Stadium: Malšovická aréna Attendance: 6,529; Referee: Marek Radina

12 May 2024 Second leg	Sigma Olomouc	1–3 (2–6 agg.)	Hradec Králové	Olomouc
15:00 CEST (UTC+2)	Juliš 57'	Report	Vašulín 43'; Pilař 45+2'; Kučera 70'	Stadium: Andrův stadion Attendance: 3,619; Referee: Dominik Starý
Note: Hradec Králové won 6–2 on aggregate.
