= 2017–18 Czech First League =

25th season of top-tier football league in Czech Republic

Czech First League
- Season: 2017–18
- Dates: 28 July 2017 – 26 May 2018
- Champions: Viktoria Plzeň
- Relegated: Vysočina Jihlava; Zbrojovka Brno
- Champions League: Viktoria Plzeň; Slavia Prague
- Europa League: Jablonec; Sparta Prague; Sigma Olomouc
- Matches: 240
- Goals: 572 (2.38 per match)
- Top goalscorer: Michal Krmenčík (16 goals)
- Biggest home win: Jablonec 5–0 Vysočina Jihlava (17 September 2017); Slavia Prague 5–0 Dukla Prague (18 November 2017)
- Biggest away win: Zlín 1–5 Mladá Boleslav (22 October 2017); Zlín 0–4 Jablonec (3 March 2018); Vysočina Jihlava 0–4 Jablonec (17 March 2018); Dukla Prague 1–5 Viktoria Plzeň (26 May 2018)
- Highest scoring: Karviná 3–5 Sigma Olomouc (16 September 2017)

The 2017–18 Czech First League, known as the HET liga for sponsorship reasons, was the 25th season of the Czech Republic's top-tier football league. The defending champions were Slavia Prague, who won their fourth Czech title the previous season. The season began on 28 July 2017 and ended on 26 May 2018.

Viktoria Plzeň made a league record by winning their first 14 league games of the season.

== Teams ==
=== Team changes ===
Promoted from 2016–17 Czech National Football League	Relegated from 2016–17 Czech First League
SK Sigma Olomouc; FC Baník Ostrava	FC Hradec Králové; 1. FK Příbram

=== Stadiums and locations ===
Locations of the 2017–18 Czech First League teams

Team	Location	Stadium	Capacity	Ref.
Baník Ostrava	Ostrava	Městský stadion (Ostrava)	15,123	
Bohemians 1905	Prague	Ďolíček	5,000	
Dukla Prague	Prague	Stadion Juliska	8,150	
Jablonec	Jablonec nad Nisou	Stadion Střelnice	6,108	
Karviná	Karviná	Městský stadion (Karviná)	4,833	
Mladá Boleslav	Mladá Boleslav	Městský stadion (Mladá Boleslav)	5,000	
Sigma Olomouc	Olomouc	Andrův stadion	12,483	
Slavia Prague	Prague	Eden Arena	20,232	
Slovácko	Uherské Hradiště	Městský fotbalový stadion Miroslava Valenty	8,000	
Slovan Liberec	Liberec	Stadion u Nisy	9,900	
Sparta Prague	Prague	Generali Arena	18,887	
Teplice	Teplice	Na Stínadlech	18,221	
Viktoria Plzeň	Plzeň	Doosan Arena	11,700	
Vysočina Jihlava	Jihlava	Stadion v Jiráskově ulici	4,500	
Zbrojovka Brno	Brno	Městský fotbalový stadion Srbská	10,200	
Fastav Zlín	Zlín	Letná Stadion	5,783	

=== Personnel and kits ===
Team	Manager	Captain	Kit maker	Shirt sponsor
FC Baník Ostrava	(Czech Republic) Bohumil Páník	(Czech Republic) Milan Baroš	Adidas	MW-DIAS
Bohemians 1905	(Czech Republic) Martin Hašek	(Czech Republic) Josef Jindřišek	Adidas	Remal, Eltodo, Lion Sport
FK Dukla Prague	(Czech Republic) Jaroslav Hynek	(Czech Republic) Marek Hanousek	Adidas	Carbounion
FK Jablonec	(Czech Republic) Zdeněk Klucký	(Czech Republic) Tomáš Hübschman	Nike	Tipgames, CPP, SaM Česká Lípa
MFK Karviná	(Czech Republic) Josef Mucha	(Czech Republic) Pavel Eismann	Adidas	OKD
FK Mladá Boleslav	(Czech Republic) Jozef Weber	(Czech Republic) Marek Matějovský	Adidas	Škoda Auto, ŠKO-ENERGO
SK Sigma Olomouc	(Czech Republic) Václav Jílek	(Czech Republic) Miloš Buchta	Adidas	Sigma Group, Olomouc, Gambrinus, GEMO Olomouc, Litovel
SK Slavia Prague	(Czech Republic) Jindřich Trpišovský	(Czech Republic) Jiří Bílek	Umbro	CEFC China
1. FC Slovácko	(Czech Republic) Stanislav Levý	(North Macedonia) Veliče Šumulikoski	Nike	Z-Group, Synottip
FC Slovan Liberec	(Czech Republic) David Holoubek	(Czech Republic) Vladimír Coufal	Nike	Preciosa
AC Sparta Prague	(Czech Republic) Pavel Hapal	(Czech Republic) David Lafata	Nike	Sazka BET
FK Teplice	(Czech Republic) Daniel Šmejkal	(Bosnia and Herzegovina) Admir Ljevaković	Puma	AGC, Umbro
FC Viktoria Plzeň	(Czech Republic) Pavel Vrba	(Czech Republic) Roman Hubník	Puma	Doosan
FC Vysočina Jihlava	(Czech Republic) Ivan Kopecký	(Czech Republic) Lukáš Vaculík	Adidas	PSJ, Jihlava
FC Zbrojovka Brno	(Slovakia) Roman Pivarník	(Czech Republic) Petr Pavlík	Nike	Synerga
FC Fastav Zlín	(Czech Republic) Vlastimil Petržela	(Czech Republic) Tomáš Poznar	Adidas	Lukrom

== League table ==
Pos	Team	Pld	W	D	L	GF	GA	GD	Pts	Qualification or relegation
1	Viktoria Plzeň (C)	30	20	6	4	55	23	+32	66	Qualification for the Champions League group stage
2	Slavia Prague	30	17	8	5	50	19	+31	59	Qualification for the Champions League third qualifying round
3	Jablonec	30	16	8	6	49	27	+22	56	Qualification for the Europa League group stage (Note: Since the winners of the 2017–18 Czech Cup, Slavia Prague, qualified for European competition based on league position, the spot awarded to the cup winners was passed to the third-placed team, the spot awarded to the third-placed team was passed to the fourth-placed team, and the spot awarded to the fourth-placed team was passed to the fifth-placed team.)
4	Sigma Olomouc	30	15	10	5	41	22	+19	55	Qualification for the Europa League third qualifying round
5	Sparta Prague	30	14	11	5	43	25	+18	53	Qualification for the Europa League second qualifying round
6	Slovan Liberec	30	13	7	10	37	35	+2	46	
7	Bohemians 1905	30	9	11	10	30	29	+1	38	
8	Teplice	30	8	10	12	32	40	−8	34	
9	Mladá Boleslav	30	9	7	14	31	43	−12	34	
10	Fastav Zlín	30	8	9	13	31	48	−17	33	
11	Dukla Prague	30	9	5	16	32	55	−23	32	
12	Slovácko	30	6	13	11	23	32	−9	31	
13	Baník Ostrava	30	7	10	13	36	43	−7	31	
14	Karviná	30	7	9	14	32	40	−8	30	
15	Vysočina Jihlava (R)	30	8	6	16	30	48	−18	30	Relegation to FNL
16	Zbrojovka Brno (R)	30	6	6	18	20	43	−23	24	Relegation to FNL

Source: Fortuna liga, Soccerway
Rules for classification: 1) Points; 2) Head-to-head points; 3) Head-to-head goal difference; 4) Head-to-head goals scored; 5) Goal difference; 6) Goals scored; 7) Play-off (only if deciding champion, UEFA competitions, or relegation); 8) Draw.
(C) Champions; (R) Relegated

== Results ==
Each team plays home-and-away against every other team in the league, for a total of 30 matches played each.

Home \ Away	OST	B05	DUK	JAB	KAR	MLA	SIG	SLA	SLK	LIB	SPA	TEP	VPL	JIH	ZBR	ZLN
Baník Ostrava	—	2–0	1–2	2–2	2–1	0–1	1–1	0–0	1–2	1–1	3–2	3–3	0–0	3–1	2–0	2–2
Bohemians 1905	2–1	—	2–0	0–1	2–1	1–3	1–1	0–0	1–0	0–0	0–0	2–0	5–2	1–1	1–0	1–1
Dukla Prague	2–0	2–0	—	0–1	3–2	4–1	2–3	0–2	1–1	2–0	0–0	0–2	1–5	1–3	2–1	1–0
Jablonec	2–0	2–1	2–2	—	2–1	3–1	0–0	1–1	2–0	2–0	0–3	2–1	0–1	5–0	1–0	2–0
Karviná	0–0	1–0	1–3	2–1	—	1–1	3–5	0–2	0–0	0–1	1–1	1–1	1–3	2–0	2–1	4–0
Mladá Boleslav	0–0	1–2	1–0	1–1	0–1	—	1–2	0–3	1–1	0–3	0–1	2–2	0–2	2–1	3–0	0–1
Sigma Olomouc	1–0	1–1	3–0	0–0	1–1	3–0	—	1–1	1–0	2–1	1–0	1–0	0–0	1–1	3–0	2–0
Slavia Prague	2–1	1–0	5–0	1–3	3–2	4–0	3–1	—	0–0	1–2	2–0	1–0	2–0	2–0	2–0	1–2
Slovácko	5–2	1–0	2–0	1–1	0–0	0–1	0–0	0–3	—	0–1	1–1	0–0	1–4	2–1	1–0	1–1
Slovan Liberec	2–1	1–0	3–0	4–1	2–2	1–0	1–0	0–0	1–1	—	1–1	1–2	0–3	1–3	2–0	1–0
Sparta Prague	3–2	1–1	3–0	2–0	2–0	3–0	1–0	3–3	1–0	2–0	—	3–0	0–1	1–0	1–1	2–1
Teplice	0–0	0–0	3–1	1–1	1–0	1–1	1–2	0–3	3–0	2–1	1–1	—	0–0	3–1	1–4	2–1
Viktoria Plzeň	3–0	2–1	4–0	2–0	2–0	1–2	1–0	1–0	1–1	2–2	2–2	2–1	—	0–1	3–0	2–1
Vysočina Jihlava	2–1	2–4	3–2	0–4	0–2	0–0	0–1	1–0	0–0	3–1	0–1	3–1	1–2	—	0–2	1–1
Zbrojovka Brno	1–3	0–0	0–0	0–3	0–0	0–3	1–0	0–1	2–1	1–2	2–0	1–0	1–3	0–0	—	1–1
Fastav Zlín	0–2	1–1	1–1	0–4	1–0	1–5	1–4	1–1	2–1	3–1	2–2	2–0	0–1	2–1	2–1	—

Source: Fortuna liga
Legend: Blue = home team win; Yellow = draw; Red = away team win.

== Top scorers ==
Rank	Player	Club	Goals
1	(Czech Republic) Michal Krmenčík	Viktoria Plzeň	16
2	(Czech Republic) Milan Škoda	Slavia Prague	11
2	(Czech Republic) Stanislav Tecl	Jablonec	11
2	(Czech Republic) Jakub Plšek	Sigma Olomouc	11
5	(Czech Republic) David Vaněček	Teplice	10
5	(Czech Republic) Matěj Pulkrab	Slovan Liberec	10
5	(Latvia) Dāvis Ikaunieks	Vysočina Jihlava	10
8	(Czech Republic) Milan Baroš	Baník Ostrava	9
8	(Czech Republic) Josef Šural	Sparta Prague	9
8	(Czech Republic) Tomáš Wágner	Karviná	9

== Attendances ==
Pos	Team	Total	High	Low	Average	Change
1	Slavia Prague	186,040	19,084	9,623	12,431	+6.9%
2	Sparta Prague	170,876	17,134	6,234	11,392	+13.8%
3	Viktoria Plzeň	143,643	11,640	4,138	9,576	−4.6%
4	Baník Ostrava	118,340	15,020	3,916	7,889	n/a
5	Sigma Olomouc	80,052	11,028	2,456	5,337	n/a
6	Slovan Liberec	74,892	9,900	2,446	4,993	+11.3%
7	Slovácko	67,425	6,127	3,594	4,495	+7.1%
8	Teplice	66,562	10,142	2,072	4,437	−8.8%
9	Zbrojovka Brno	65,021	8,026	2,216	4,335	−5.1%
10	Fastav Zlín	62,774	5,898	2,102	4,185	−4.6%
11	Bohemians 1905	61,755	5,000	1,905	4,117	−5.9%
12	Karviná	53,306	4,833	2,245	3,554	−8.2%
13	Jablonec	48,457	5,426	1,710	3,230	+27.1%
14	Vysočina Jihlava	45,995	4,500	2,063	3,066	+5.2%
15	Mladá Boleslav	43,256	5,000	1,017	2,884	−13.9%
16	Dukla Prague	42,202	7,324	827	2,813	+27.9%
	League total	1,331,016	19,084	827	5,546	+13.5%

Source: FortunaLiga.cz

== Number of teams by region ==
Rank	Region	Number of teams	Club(s)
1	Prague	4	Bohemians 1905, Dukla Prague, Sparta Prague, Slavia Prague
2	Liberec	2	Jablonec, Slovan Liberec
2	Moravian-Silesian	2	Baník Ostrava, Karviná
2	Zlín	2	Fastav Zlín, Slovácko
5	Central Bohemian	1	Mladá Boleslav
5	Olomouc	1	Sigma Olomouc
5	Plzeň	1	Viktoria Plzeň
5	South Moravian	1	Zbrojovka Brno
5	Ústí nad Labem	1	Teplice
5	Vysočina	1	Vysočina Jihlava

== See also ==
- 2017–18 Czech Cup
- 2017–18 Czech National Football League
