= Martin Pospíšil (footballer) =

Czech footballer

Personal information
- Date of birth: 26 June 1991 (age 35)
- Place of birth: Bělkovice-Lašťany, Czechoslovakia
- Height: 1.78 m (5 ft 10 in)
- Position: Midfielder

Team information
- Current team: Artis Brno
- Number: 26

Youth career
- –2010: Sigma Olomouc

Senior career*
Years	Team	Apps	(Gls)
2011–2013	Sigma Olomouc	48	(4)
2011	→ Třinec (loan)	15	(0)
2013–2014	Viktoria Plzeň	4	(0)
2014	→ Sigma Olomouc (loan)	14	(2)
2014–2017	Jablonec	82	(12)
2017–2023	Jagiellonia Białystok	182	(9)
2023–2025	Sigma Olomouc	42	(1)
2024–2025	Sigma Olomouc B	14	(3)
2025–	Artis Brno	51	(7)

International career
2010	Czech Republic U19	1	(0)
2012–2014	Czech Republic U21	4	(0)
2012	Czech Republic	3	(0)
- * Club domestic league appearances and goals as of 12 September 2026, 13:00 (UTC)

Martin Pospíšil (born 26 June 1991) is a Czech professional footballer who plays as a midfielder and captain for Czech First League club Artis Brno.

== Career ==
On 4 July 2017, Pospíšil joined Ekstraklasa club Jagiellonia Białystok on a four-year contract for a fee reported to be between €200,000 and €300,000.

After playing for the Czech Republic under-21 national team, he debuted for the senior team against Slovakia on 14 November 2012.

== Career statistics ==
As of match played 12 September 2026

Appearances and goals by club, season and competition
Club	Season	League			National cup (Note: Includes Czech Cup, Polish Cup)		Continental		Other		Total	
Club	Season	Division	Apps	Goals	Apps	Goals	Apps	Goals	Apps	Goals	Apps	Goals
Sigma Olomouc	2010–11	First League	2	0	0	0	—		—		2	0
Sigma Olomouc	2011–12	First League	11	3	3	0	—		—		14	3
Sigma Olomouc	2012–13	First League	28	1	2	0	—		1 (Note: Appearance in Czech Supercup)	0	31	1
Sigma Olomouc	2013–14	First League	7	0	—		—		—		31	1
Sigma Olomouc	Total		48	4	5	0	—		1	0	54	4
Třinec (loan)	2011–12	Second League	15	0	0	0	—		—		15	0
Viktoria Plzeň	2013–14	First League	4	0	0	0	2 (Note: Appearances in UEFA Champions League)	0	—		4	0
Sigma Olomouc (loan)	2013–14	First League	14	2	—		—		—		14	2
Jablonec	2014–15	First League	30	7	8	1	—		—		38	8
Jablonec	2015–16	First League	28	4	5	0	4 (Note: Appearances in UEFA Europa League)	1	—		37	5
Jablonec	2016–17	First League	24	1	2	0	—		—		26	1
Jablonec	Total		82	12	15	1	4	1	—		101	14
Jagiellonia Białystok	2017–18	Ekstraklasa	35	5	0	0	2	0	—		37	5
Jagiellonia Białystok	2018–19	Ekstraklasa	34	1	4	0	4	2	—		42	3
Jagiellonia Białystok	2019–20	Ekstraklasa	35	2	1	0	—		—		36	2
Jagiellonia Białystok	2020–21	Ekstraklasa	29	1	1	0	—		—		30	1
Jagiellonia Białystok	2021–22	Ekstraklasa	33	0	1	0	—		—		34	0
Jagiellonia Białystok	2022–23	Ekstraklasa	16	0	2	0	—		—		18	0
Jagiellonia Białystok	Total		182	9	9	0	6	2	0	0	197	11
Sigma Olomouc	2022–23	First League	14	0	—		—		—		14	0
Sigma Olomouc	2023–24	First League	26	0	3	0	—		1 (Note: Appearance in First League Conference League Play-offs)	0	30	0
Sigma Olomouc	2024–25	First League	1	0	0	0	—		—		1	0
Sigma Olomouc	Total		41	0	3	0	—		1	0	45	0
Sigma Olomouc B	2024–25	National Football League	14	3	—		—		—		14	3
Artis Brno	2024–25	National Football League	14	1	—						14	1
Artis Brno	2025–26	National Football League	29	6	2	1	—		2 (Note: Appearance in First League Relegation Play-offs)	0	33	7
Artis Brno	2026–27	First League	8	0	2	1	—		—		10	1
Career total			441	37	36	3	12	3	4	0	493	43

== Honours ==
Sigma Olomouc

- Czech Cup: 2011–12
- Czech Supercup: 2012

Individual

- Ekstraklasa Player of the Month: February 2018
