= 2021–22 Czech First League =

29th season of top-tier football league in Czech Republic

Czech First League
- Season: 2021–22
- Dates: 24 July 2021 – 14 May 2022
- Champions: Viktoria Plzeň
- Relegated: Karviná
- Champions League: Viktoria Plzeň
- Europa League: Slovácko
- Europa Conference League: Slavia Prague; Sparta Prague
- Matches: 276
- Goals: 763 (2.76 per match)
- Top goalscorer: Jean-David Beauguel (19 goals)
- Biggest home win: Plzeň 6–0 Bohemians 1905; 27 November 2021
- Biggest away win: Liberec 0–5 Sparta Prague; 31 July 2021
- Highest scoring: Mladá Boleslav 3–5 Slovácko; 26 September 2021
- Longest winning run: 7 matches Slavia
- Longest unbeaten run: 12 matches Plzeň still ongoing as at 6 March 2022
- Longest winless run: 19 matches Karviná
- Longest losing run: 7 matches Teplice & Karviná
- Highest attendance: 19,370; Slavia 2–0 Sparta; 6 March 2022
- Lowest attendance: 246; Hradec Králové 1–0 Karviná; 28 November 2021
- Total attendance: 646,213
- Average attendance: 3,366
- All statistics correct as of 10 March 2021.

The 2021–22 Czech First League, known as the Fortuna Liga is the 29th season of the Czech Republic's top-tier football for professional clubs since its 1993 establishment. SK Slavia Prague were the reigning champions. The season started on 24 July 2021. The first half of the season had 19 rounds, finishing on 19 December 2021, and the other half commenced on 5 February 2022. The season ended on 14 May 2022 with two extra play-out fixtures on 19 and 22 May 2022.

The season format was changed back to be played with 16 clubs, each team playing in the league format home and away matches, before the league split into three sections: championship, play-off and relegation groups. The lowest-ranked team was relegated directly to the second league, the two teams positioned 14th and 15th played a play-out with two teams from the second league positioned 2nd and 3rd in a home and away format. This was the fourth season to use VAR, featuring it in all matches played. All matches were played on weekdays, with no Friday fixtures expected.

== Season summary ==
This was the fourth season sponsored by the Fortuna betting agency with a contract valid until 2024 as well as TV broadcasting rights held by O2 TV, which showed all eight matches per week. This was the first season that national broadcaster ČT Sport did not possess any rights to broadcast any of the fixtures. Blesk held the rights to the highlights from all matches. The 2021–22 season began on 24 July, thirteen days after the UEFA Euro 2020 final. With most of the national team players still released for vacations, Slavia Prague, Sparta Prague and Plzeň started with incomplete first-team squads.

After ten match-weeks the trio recorded one loss each, Viktoria in the 6th round at Hradec Králové, Sparta in the seventh round in Plzeň and Slavia in round 10 in the Prague Derby at Letná on 3 October 2021. Sparta Prague ended the longest non-winning streak of derby matches after five-and-a-half years at 14 matches. It was also an interruption of Slavia Prague's record unbeaten streak of 54 matches in the first league.

== Teams ==
Locations of the 2021–22 Czech First League teams

=== Promotion and relegation (pre-season) ===
A total of sixteen teams contest the league, including fifteen sides from the 2020–21 season and the winner of last season's second league.

Team promoted to Czech First League

Due to a reduction from 18 to 16 teams, only the winner of the FNL advanced to the first league. On 8 May 2021 Hradec Králové defeated Dukla Prague 2–1 and secured the promotion with three matches remaining. Hradec Králové therefore participated in the top tier after four years of absence.

Teams relegated from Czech First League

The three lowest positioned teams from the last season were relegated to the Fortuna National League.

On 8 May 2021, Opava became the first team to be relegated to FNL after a 1–1 draw at Zlín with three games remaining, ending their three-year stay in the top flight.

On 16 May 2021, Zbrojovka became the second team to be relegated to FNL after a 1–1 draw at Slovan Liberec with two games remaining, ending their one-year stay in the top flight.

On 23 May 2021, Příbram's relegation was confirmed following a 0–1 defeat at home against Pardubice with one game remaining, ending their First League tenure after three years.

=== Locations and stadiums ===
Team	Location	Stadium	Capacity	Ref.
Bohemians Praha 1905	Prague	Ďolíček	5,000	
SK Dynamo České Budějovice	České Budějovice	Stadion Střelecký ostrov	6,681	
FC Hradec Králové	Hradec Králové	Lokotrans Aréna (Note: Hradec Králové played their home matches in Mladá Boleslav due to the rebuilding of their own Všesportovní stadion.)	5,000	
FK Jablonec	Jablonec nad Nisou	Stadion Střelnice	6,108	
MFK Karviná	Karviná	Městský stadion (Karviná)	4,833	
FC Slovan Liberec	Liberec	Stadion u Nisy	9,900	
FK Mladá Boleslav	Mladá Boleslav	Lokotrans Aréna	5,000	
SK Sigma Olomouc	Olomouc	Andrův stadion	12,483	
FC Baník Ostrava	Ostrava	Městský stadion (Ostrava)	15,123	
FC Viktoria Plzeň	Plzeň	Doosan Arena	11,700	
SK Slavia Prague	Prague	Sinobo Stadium	19,370	
1. FC Slovácko	Uherské Hradiště	Městský fotbalový stadion Miroslava Valenty	8,000	
AC Sparta Prague	Prague	Generali Česká pojišťovna Arena	18,944	
FK Teplice	Teplice	Na Stínadlech	18,221	
FC Fastav Zlín	Zlín	Letná Stadion	5,783	
FK Pardubice	Pardubice	Ďolíček (Note: Pardubice continued to play their home matches in Prague's Bohemians due to the rebuilding of their own stadium Pod Vinicí.)	5,000	

Region	Number of teams	Club(s)
Prague	3	Bohemians, Sparta, Slavia
Liberec	2	Jablonec, Liberec
Moravian-Silesian	2	Ostrava, Karviná
Zlín	2	Zlín, Slovácko
Central Bohemian	1	Mladá Boleslav
Hradec Králové	1	Hradec Králové
Olomouc	1	Olomouc
Pardubice	1	Pardubice
Plzeň	1	Plzeň
South Bohemian	1	České Budějovice
Ústí nad Labem	1	Teplice

=== Personnel and kits ===
Team	Head coach	Head coach appointed	Shirt manufacturer	Shirt sponsor
Bohemians 1905	(Czech Republic) Jaroslav Veselý	21 March 2022	Adidas	BALSHOP.cz
České Budějovice	(Czech Republic) David Horejš		Adidas	Budějovický Budvar
Hradec Králové	(Czech Republic) Miroslav Koubek	21 May 2021	Jako	Město Hradec Králové
Jablonec	(Czech Republic) Petr Rada		Capelli Sport	MOL; Gitschberg Jochtal
Karviná	(Czech Republic) Bohumil Páník	7 October 2021	Adidas	OKD
Liberec	(Czech Republic) Luboš Kozel	29 August 2021	Nike	AAA Auto
Mladá Boleslav	(Czech Republic) Pavel Hoftych	23 February 2022	Adidas	Škoda Auto
Olomouc	(Czech Republic) Václav Jílek	31 May 2021	Adidas	Tipsport; Sigma
Ostrava	(Czech Republic) Ondřej Smetana		Jako	MW-Dias; Město Ostrava
Plzeň	(Czech Republic) Michal Bílek		Macron	Doosan
Slavia Prague	(Czech Republic) Jindřich Trpišovský	22 December 2017	Puma	eToro
Slovácko	(Czech Republic) Martin Svědík		Puma	Z-Group
Sparta Prague	(Czech Republic) Pavel Vrba		Adidas	Tipsport (Local); T-Mobile (Europe)
Teplice	(Czech Republic) Jiří Jarošík	28 September 2021	Puma	AGC; Bílinská kyselka
Zlín	(Czech Republic) Jan Jelínek		Adidas	Climax Sunscreens
Pardubice	(Czech Republic) Jaroslav Novotný (Czech Republic) Jiří Krejčí		Lotto	ČPP Servis

== Managerial changes ==
Ahead of the season:

Team	Outgoing manager	Manner of departure	Date of vacancy	Replaced by	Date of appointment	Contract valid until
Hradec Králové	(Czech Republic) Zdenko Frťala	Resigned	9 May 2021	(Czech Republic) Miroslav Koubek	21 May 2021	Undisclosed
Sigma	(Czech Republic) Radoslav Látal	End of contract	3 May 2021	(Czech Republic) Václav Jílek	31 May 2021	Summer 2023

During the season:

Team	Outgoing manager	Manner of departure	Date of vacancy	Match-week	Position in table	Replaced by	Date of appointment	Contract valid until
Liberec	(Czech Republic) Pavel Hoftych	Mutual consent	26 August 2021	5	16	(Czech Republic) Luboš Kozel	29 August 2021	Undisclosed
Teplice	(Czech Republic) Radim Kučera	Sacked	26 September 2021	9	15	(Czech Republic) Jiří Jarošík	28 September 2021	Summer 2024
Karviná	(Czech Republic) Jozef Weber	Sacked	6 October 2021	10	16	(Czech Republic) Bohumil Páník	7 October 2021	Undisclosed
Mladá Boleslav	(Czech Republic) Karel Jarolím	Sacked	23 February 2022	22	6	(Czech Republic) Pavel Hoftych	23 February 2022	Undisclosed
Bohemians	(Czech Republic) Luděk Klusáček	Mutual consent	23 February 2022	26	13	(Czech Republic) Jaroslav Veselý	21 March 2022	End of season
Sparta Prague	(Czech Republic) Pavel Vrba	Sacked	9 May 2022	34	3	(Czech Republic) Michal Horňák	9 May 2022	End of season

== Regular season ==
=== League table ===
Pos	Team	Pld	W	D	L	GF	GA	GD	Pts	Qualification or relegation
1	Slavia Prague	30	23	4	3	71	19	+52	73	Qualification for the championship group
2	Viktoria Plzeň	30	22	6	2	53	19	+34	72	Qualification for the championship group
3	Sparta Prague	30	20	6	4	65	32	+33	66	Qualification for the championship group
4	Slovácko	30	18	5	7	50	30	+20	59	Qualification for the championship group
5	Baník Ostrava	30	14	9	7	54	39	+15	51	Qualification for the championship group
6	Hradec Králové	30	9	13	8	38	40	−2	40	Qualification for the championship group
7	Mladá Boleslav	30	11	5	14	45	48	−3	38	Qualification for the play-off
8	Slovan Liberec	30	10	7	13	29	38	−9	37	Qualification for the play-off
9	Sigma Olomouc	30	9	10	11	39	37	+2	37	Qualification for the play-off
10	České Budějovice	30	9	9	12	40	46	−6	36	Qualification for the play-off
11	Fastav Zlín	30	8	6	16	36	53	−17	30	Qualification for the relegation group
12	Teplice	30	8	3	19	29	49	−20	27	Qualification for the relegation group
13	Jablonec	30	4	14	12	22	45	−23	26	Qualification for the relegation group
14	Bohemians 1905	30	6	8	16	34	56	−22	26	Qualification for the relegation group
15	Pardubice	30	5	9	16	35	67	−32	24	Qualification for the relegation group
16	Karviná	30	3	8	19	30	52	−22	17	Qualification for the relegation group

Source: Fortuna Liga
Rules for classification: 1) Points; 2) Head-to-head points; 3) Head-to-head goal difference; 4) Head-to-head goals scored; 5) Goal difference; 6) Goals scored; 7) Fair-play ranking; 8) Draw.

=== Results ===
Home \ Away	BOH	CBU	HKR	JAB	KAR	LIB	MLA	OLO	OST	PCE	PLZ	SLA	SLO	SPA	TEP	ZLN
Bohemians 1905	—	3–1	1–1	1–2	3–0	0–0	2–2	2–0	0–2	1–2	1–2	1–5	1–2	1–1	4–2	1–0
České Budějovice	2–1	—	0–1	2–0	3–1	1–0	2–1	2–1	1–3	3–1	0–1	2–2	3–2	0–0	1–0	2–2
Hradec Králové	1–1	2–2	—	2–2	1–0	1–1	2–2	3–0	1–1	2–0	1–0	1–5	2–2	0–1	3–0	2–1
Jablonec	2–2	2–2	1–1	—	1–0	0–1	0–1	1–0	1–0	1–1	0–0	1–2	1–1	1–1	0–2	1–1
Karviná	1–1	2–2	1–1	1–1	—	1–2	0–1	1–2	1–2	3–2	0–1	3–3	2–2	1–2	1–1	2–3
Slovan Liberec	2–1	0–0	1–0	1–1	2–1	—	2–1	2–0	0–2	4–1	0–1	1–0	0–1	0–5	0–1	0–1
Mladá Boleslav	4–1	2–0	3–2	3–0	1–0	3–3	—	3–3	2–3	2–3	0–2	0–2	3–5	0–3	3–1	1–0
Sigma Olomouc	0–0	3–3	2–2	4–0	2–0	1–0	2–1	—	1–1	3–2	1–1	0–1	0–3	2–0	0–0	1–1
Baník Ostrava	4–1	4–1	0–0	1–0	1–3	1–1	1–0	1–0	—	3–1	2–2	3–3	1–2	2–2	2–4	5–1
Pardubice	3–0	3–3	0–0	1–1	2–2	2–2	1–1	1–5	0–3	—	0–1	0–5	0–0	2–4	2–0	0–0
Viktoria Plzeň	6–0	2–1	1–0	5–0	2–0	2–0	2–1	0–0	2–1	4–0	—	1–1	2–1	3–2	1–0	2–1
Slavia Prague	1–0	1–0	4–1	5–0	0–1	3–1	2–0	1–0	4–0	4–0	2–0	—	2–1	2–0	3–0	3–0
Slovácko	1–0	1–0	1–0	2–1	3–1	2–0	2–1	1–0	0–0	2–1	1–2	0–1	—	4–0	3–2	3–0
Sparta Prague	5–1	1–0	4–0	1–1	2–0	2–1	1–0	3–2	2–1	3–1	2–2	1–0	3–1	—	4–2	2–0
Teplice	1–0	2–1	1–2	1–0	1–0	1–2	0–1	0–0	1–2	1–2	0–1	1–3	0–1	0–3	—	4–1
Fastav Zlín	1–3	2–0	2–3	0–0	2–1	2–0	1–2	1–4	2–2	4–1	1–2	0–1	1–0	2–5	3–0	—

Source: Fortuna Liga
Legend: Blue = home team win; Yellow = draw; Red = away team win.
For upcoming matches, an "a" indicates there is an article about the rivalry between the two participants.

== Championship group ==
Points and goals were carried over in full from the regular season.

Pos	Team	Pld	W	D	L	GF	GA	GD	Pts	Qualification or relegation	PLZ	SLA	SPA	SLO	OST	HKR
1	Viktoria Plzeň (C)	35	26	7	2	63	21	+42	85	Qualification for the Champions League second qualifying round	—	—	3–0	3–1	1–0	—
2	Slavia Prague	35	24	6	5	80	27	+53	78	Qualification for the Europa Conference League second qualifying round	1–1	—	1–2	3–0	—	—
3	Sparta Prague	35	22	7	6	72	40	+32	73	Qualification for the Europa Conference League second qualifying round	—	—	—	1–2	3–1	1–1
4	Slovácko	35	21	5	9	59	38	+21	68	Qualification to Europa League third qualifying round (Note: Slovácko qualified for the Europa League as Czech Cup winners.)	—	—	—	—	3–1	3–0
5	Baník Ostrava	35	15	10	10	60	48	+12	55		—	1–1	—	—	—	3–1
6	Hradec Králové	35	10	14	11	44	52	−8	44		0–2	4–3	—	—	—	—

Source: Fortuna Liga
Legend: Blue = home team win; Yellow = draw; Red = away team win.
Rules for classification: 1) Total points; 2) Points earned in regular season; 3) Head-to-head points (regular season); 4) Head-to-head goal difference (regular season); 5) Head-to-head goals scored (regular season); 5) Goal difference (all matches); 6) Goals scored (all matches); 7) Fair-play ranking; 8) Draw.
(C) Champions

== Play-off ==
Because only four teams qualified for European competitions from the Czech First League due to a low national coefficient, the winner of the play-off only received a cash bonus and a better position in the 2022–23 Czech Cup.

First round
Sigma Olomouc	1	2	3
Slovan Liberec	0	0	0
České Budějovice	2	0	2
Mladá Boleslav	3	1	4

Second round
Sigma Olomouc	1	2	3
Mladá Boleslav	2	2	4

== Relegation group ==
Points and goals were carried over in full from the regular season.

Pos	Team	Pld	W	D	L	GF	GA	GD	Pts	Qualification or relegation	PCE	ZLN	JAB	BOH	TEP	KAR
11	Pardubice	35	9	10	16	42	68	−26	37		—	1–1	—	—	—	2–0
12	Fastav Zlín	35	9	9	17	43	60	−17	36		—	—	1–1	1–4	3–0	—
13	Jablonec	35	6	16	13	27	48	−21	34		0–1	—	—	1–1	—	2–0
14	Bohemians 1905 (O)	35	8	10	17	45	61	−16	34	Qualification for the relegation play-offs	0–1	—	—	—	—	4–0
15	Teplice (O)	35	8	5	22	33	59	−26	29	Qualification for the relegation play-offs	0–2	—	0–1	2–2	—	—
16	Karviná (R)	35	3	10	22	33	63	−30	19	Relegation to the FNL	—	1–1	—	—	2–2	—

Source: Fortuna Liga
Legend: Blue = home team win; Yellow = draw; Red = away team win.
Rules for classification: 1) Total points; 2) Points earned in regular season; 3) Head-to-head points (regular season); 4) Head-to-head goal difference (regular season); 5) Head-to-head goals scored (regular season); 5) Goal difference (all matches); 6) Goals scored (all matches); 7) Fair-play ranking; 8) Draw.
(O) Play-off winners; (R) Relegated

== Relegation play-offs ==
Teams placed 14th and 15th in the relegation group faced the teams placed second and third in the Czech National Football League for two spots in the next season.

Team 1	Agg.	Team 2	1st leg	2nd leg
Opava	0–3	Bohemians 1905	0–1	0–2
Teplice	5–2	Vlašim	3–0	2–2

== Season statistics ==
=== Top scorers ===
Updated at the end of the season.

Rank	Player	Club	Goals
1	(France) Jean-David Beauguel	Plzeň	19
2	(Czech Republic) Václav Jurečka	Slovácko	17
3	(Slovakia) Ladislav Almási	Ostrava	16
4	(Czech Republic) Ondřej Lingr	Slavia	14
5	(Czech Republic) Tomáš Čvančara	Jablonec / Sparta	12
6	(Brazil) Ewerton	Mladá Boleslav	11
6	(Czech Republic) David Puškáč	Bohemians 1905	11
8	(Slovakia) Ivan Schranz	Slavia	10
8	(Czech Republic) David Douděra	Mladá Boleslav	10
10	(Czech Republic) Jan Kuchta	Slavia	9
10	(Nigeria) Fortune Bassey	České Budějovice	9
10	(Czech Republic) Jakub Rada	Hradec Králové	9
10	(Czech Republic) Adam Hložek	Sparta	9

=== Hat-tricks ===
Matchweek	Date	Player	For	Against	Result
2	30 July 2021	(Slovakia) Ivan Schranz	Slavia	Teplice	3–1 (A)
9	26 September 2021	(Brazil) Ewerton	Mladá Boleslav	Slovácko	3–5 (H)
18	12 December 2021	(Czech Republic) Matěj Pulkrab	Sparta	Bohemians	5–1 (H)
32	30 April 2022	(Czech Republic) Václav Jurečka	Slovácko	Ostrava	3–1 (H)
35	15 May 2022	(Czech Republic) David Puškáč^{4}	Bohemians 1905	Karviná	4–0 (H)

Notes

^{4} Player scored 4 goals
(H) – Home team
(A) – Away team

=== Clean sheets ===
Updated at the end of the season.

Rank	Player	Club	Clean sheets
1	(Czech Republic) Jindřich Staněk	Plzeň	14
2	(Czech Republic) Aleš Mandous	Slavia	10
3	(Slovakia) Matúš Macík	Olomouc	9
4	(Czech Republic) Jan Šeda	Mladá Boleslav	8
4	(Czech Republic) Filip Nguyen	Slovácko	8
6	(Czech Republic) Jan Laštůvka	Ostrava	7
6	(Slovakia) Matej Rakovan	Zlín	7
6	(Czech Republic) Jan Hanuš	Jablonec	7
9	(Romania) Florin Niță	Sparta	6
9	(Czech Republic) Vilém Fendrich	Hradec Králové	6
9	(Czech Republic) Ondřej Kolář	Slavia	6
9	(Czech Republic) Jakub Markovič	Pardubice	6

== Awards ==
=== Monthly awards ===
Month	Player of the Month		Manager of the Month	
Month	Player	Club	Manager	Club
August	(Slovakia) Ivan Schranz	Slavia	(Czech Republic) Pavel Vrba	Sparta
September	(Slovakia) Ladislav Almási	Ostrava	(Czech Republic) Michal Bílek	Plzeň
October	(Brazil) Ewerton	Mladá Boleslav	(Czech Republic) Martin Svědík	Slovácko
November	(Nigeria) Fortune Bassey	České Budějovice	(Czech Republic) Jindřich Trpišovský	Slavia
December	(Czech Republic) Matěj Pulkrab	Sparta	(Czech Republic) Michal Bílek	Plzeň
February	(Czech Republic) Jan Fortelný	Teplice	(Czech Republic) Jiří Jarošík	Teplice
March	(Czech Republic) Ondřej Lingr	Slavia	(Czech Republic) Miroslav Koubek	Hradec Králové
April	(Czech Republic) David Douděra	Mladá Boleslav	(Czech Republic) Michal Bílek	Plzeň
May	(France) Jean-David Beauguel	Plzeň	(Czech Republic) Michal Bílek	Plzeň

=== Annual awards ===
Award	Winner	Club
Player of the Season	(Czech Republic) Tomáš Holeš	Slavia Prague
Manager of the Season	(Czech Republic) Michal Bílek	Viktoria Plzeň
International of the Season	(France) Jean-David Beauguel	Viktoria Plzeň
Fans' choice Player of the Season	(Czech Republic) Adam Hložek	Sparta Prague
Newcomer of the Season	(Czech Republic) David Jurásek	Mladá Boleslav / Slavia Prague
Figure of the Season	(Czech Republic) Marek Matějovský	Mladá Boleslav
Goalkeeper of the Season	(Czech Republic) Jindřich Staněk	Viktoria Plzeň
Defender of the Season	(Denmark) Alexander Bah	Slavia Prague
Midfield of the Season	(Czech Republic) Tomáš Holeš	Slavia Prague
Forward of the Season	(France) Jean-David Beauguel	Viktoria Plzeň
