= Jean-David Beauguel =

French footballer (born 1992)

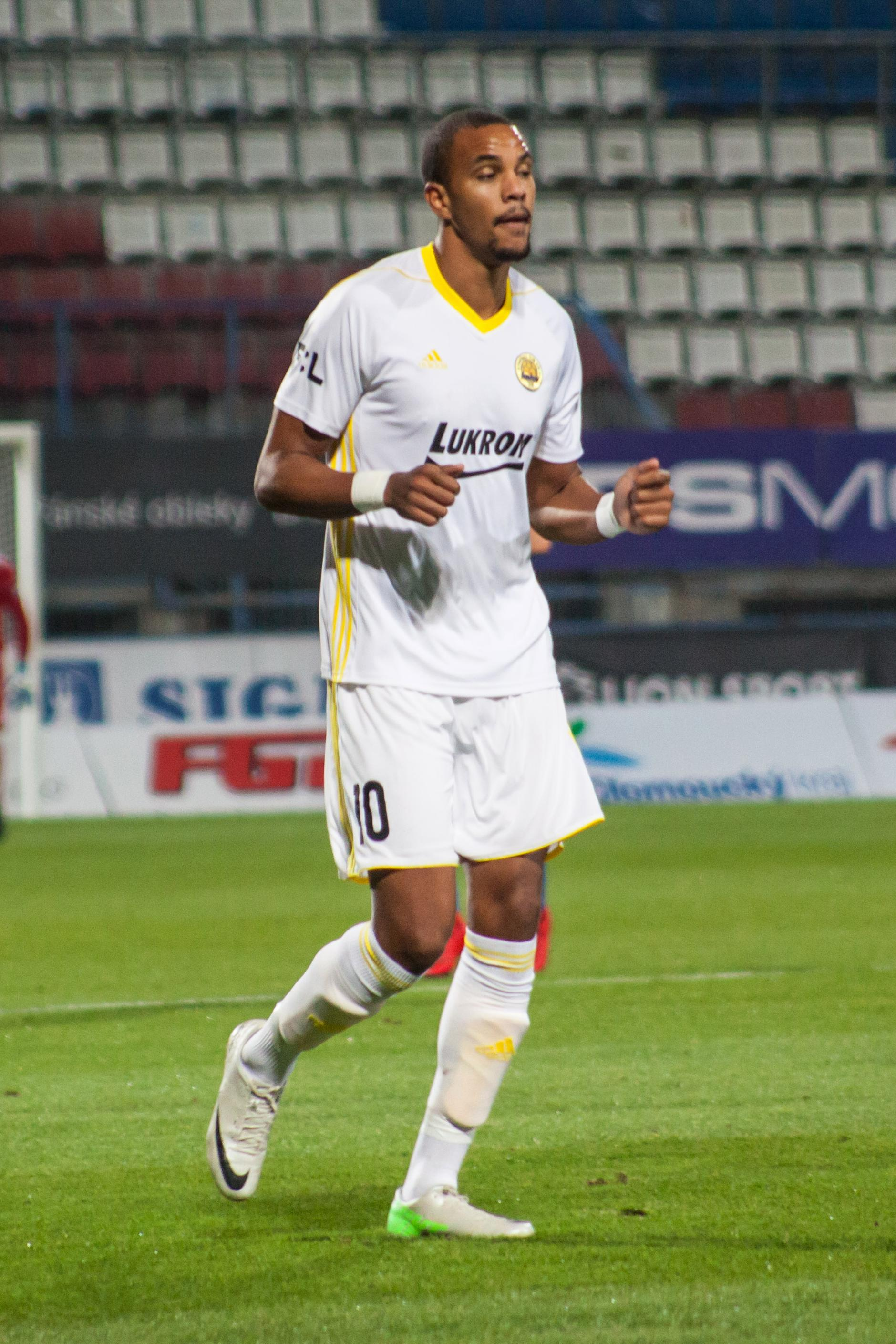
- Beauguel with Fastav Zlín

Personal information
- Full name: Jean-David Baptiste Francois Beauguel
- Date of birth: 21 March 1992 (age 34)
- Place of birth: Strasbourg, France
- Height: 1.96 m (6 ft 5 in)
- Position: Striker

Team information
- Current team: Viktoria Plzeň B

Youth career
- Chamois Niortais

Senior career*
| Years | Team | Apps | (Gls) |
| 2011 | Toulouse | 0 | (0) |
| 2012–2013 | Espérance de Tunis | 0 | (0) |
| 2013–2014 | Waalwijk | 28 | (4) |
| 2014–2017 | Dukla Prague | 61 | (9) |
| 2017–2018 | Fastav Zlín | 36 | (14) |
| 2019–2022 | Viktoria Plzeň | 97 | (43) |
| 2022–2023 | Al-Wehda | 16 | (2) |
| 2024–2025 | Qingdao West Coast | 25 | (5) |
| 2025 | Stal Mielec | 6 | (0) |
| 2025–2026 | Artis Brno | 6 | (1) |
| 2026– | Viktoria Plzeň B | 0 | (0) |
- * Club domestic league appearances and goals as of 14:00, 15 February 2026 (UTC)

Jean-David Baptiste Francois Beauguel (born 21 March 1992) is a French professional footballer who plays as a striker for Bohemian Football League club Viktoria Plzeň B.

After starting his football career in his native France, he moved to Tunisia for half-a-year, before spending a season playing club football in the Netherlands. In 2014, he moved to the Czech Republic, where he played until 2022. He made a switch to Saudi Arabia in 2022, before moving to China in 2024. In 2025, he joined Polish club Stal Mielec.

== Career ==
=== Early career ===
Beauguel played for Toulouse in France. Although he didn't play in any league matches, he scored in a Coupe de la Ligue match against Nice on 31 August 2011. He later headed to the Netherlands, where he played for RKC Waalwijk, but left after the club was relegated from the Eredivisie at the end of the 2013–14 season.

=== Czech Republic ===
Beauguel trialled with Czech club Dukla Prague in July 2014, scoring four goals in a half-hour section of a friendly match in a pre-season friendly versus Varnsdorf. A week later he signed a three-year contract with Dukla. Beauguel scored seven goals in the first half of the 2014–15 Czech First League. Having scored nine goals in 61 games for Dukla over the course of two and a half seasons, Beauguel signed for First League side Fastav Zlín in January 2017.

In November 2018, with his Zlín contract due to expire in less than two months, he signed a pre-contract agreement with Viktoria Plzeň. On 8 December, he did not appear for Zlín in their Czech First League match against Plzeň, having asked Zlín coach Michal Bílek not to select him for the match. This stirred controversy in the media, with news outlet iSport reporting that Viktoria Plzeň allegedly pressured the player to skip the match. Zlín lost the match 2–0.

=== Al-Wehda ===
On 17 June 2022, Beauguel joined Saudi Arabian club Al-Wehda.

=== Qingdao West Coast ===
On 24 February 2024, Beauguel signed with Chinese Super League club Qingdao West Coast.

=== Stal Mielec ===
On 24 February 2025, Beauguel moved to Polish top-flight side Stal Mielec on a deal until June 2025. Goalless in six appearances, he was released by Stal at the end of the 2024–25 season.

=== Artis Brno ===
On 2 September 2025, Beauguel signed a two-year contract with Czech National Football League club Artis Brno as a free agent. On 17 August 2026, the club terminated the contract due to Beauguel's persistent medical issues.

=== Viktoria Plzeň B ===
On 17 September 2026, Beauguel signed a contract with Bohemian Football League club Viktoria Plzeň B until the end of the season as an amateur player.

== Personal life ==
Born in France, Beauguel is of Chadian descent through his father.

== Career statistics ==
As of match played 3 May 2025

Appearances and goals by club, season and competition
| Club | Season | League | | | National cup (Note: Includes Czech Cup, King's Cup, Chinese FA Cup) | | Continental | | Other | | Total | |
| Club | Season | Division | Apps | Goals | Apps | Goals | Apps | Goals | Apps | Goals | Apps | Goals |
|---|---|---|---|---|---|---|---|---|---|---|---|---|
| Waalwijk | 2013–14 | Eredivisie | 28 | 4 | 0 | 0 | — | | 3 (Note: Appearances in Eredivisie relegation play-offs) | 2 | 31 | 6 |
| Dukla Prague | 2014–15 | Czech First League | 27 | 8 | 0 | 0 | — | | — | | 27 | 8 |
| Dukla Prague | 2015–16 | Czech First League | 20 | 0 | 4 | 1 | — | | — | | 24 | 1 |
| Dukla Prague | 2016–17 | Czech First League | 14 | 1 | 2 | 0 | — | | — | | 16 | 1 |
| Dukla Prague | Total | | 61 | 9 | 6 | 1 | — | | — | | 67 | 10 |
| Fastav Zlín | 2016–17 | Czech First League | 7 | 2 | 2 | 0 | — | | — | | 9 | 2 |
| Fastav Zlín | 2017–18 | Czech First League | 11 | 3 | 1 | 0 | 1 (Note: Appearance(s) in UEFA Europa League) | 0 | 1 (Note: Appearance in Czech-Slovak Supercup) | 1 | 14 | 4 |
| Fastav Zlín | 2018–19 | Czech First League | 18 | 9 | 2 | 0 | — | | — | | 20 | 9 |
| Fastav Zlín | Total | | 36 | 14 | 5 | 0 | 1 | 0 | 1 | 1 | 43 | 15 |
| Viktoria Plzeň | 2018–19 | Czech First League | 13 | 6 | — | | 2 | 0 | — | | 15 | 6 |
| Viktoria Plzeň | 2019–20 | Czech First League | 21 | 6 | 4 | 1 | 0 | 0 | — | | 25 | 7 |
| Viktoria Plzeň | 2020–21 | Czech First League | 30 | 12 | 5 | 2 | 3 (Note: Appearance in UEFA Champions League, two appearances in UEFA Europa League) | 0 | — | | 38 | 14 |
| Viktoria Plzeň | 2021–22 | Czech First League | 33 | 19 | 2 | 0 | 5 (Note: Appearances in UEFA Europa Conference League) | 2 | — | | 40 | 21 |
| Viktoria Plzeň | Total | | 97 | 43 | 11 | 3 | 10 | 2 | 0 | 0 | 118 | 48 |
| Al Wehda | 2022–23 | Saudi Pro League | 16 | 2 | 2 | 1 | — | | — | | 18 | 3 |
| Qingdao West Coast | 2024 | Chinese Super League | 25 | 5 | 1 | 0 | — | | — | | 26 | 5 |
| Stal Mielec | 2024–25 | Ekstraklasa | 6 | 0 | — | | — | | — | | 6 | 0 |
| Career total | | | 269 | 77 | 25 | 5 | 11 | 2 | 4 | 3 | 309 | 87 |

== Honours ==
Fastav Zlín

- Czech Cup: 2016–17
- Czech-Slovak Supercup: 2017

Viktoria Plzeň

- Czech First League: 2021–22

Individual

- Czech First League top goalscorer: 2021–22
- Czech First League Forward of the Year: 2021–22
- Czech First League International of the Season: 2021–22
- Czech First League Player of the Month: May 2022
