= 2016–17 Czech First League =

24th season of top-tier football league in Czech Republic

Czech First League
- Season: 2016–17
- Dates: 29 July 2016 – 27 May 2017
- Champions: Slavia Prague
- Relegated: Hradec Králové; FK Příbram
- Champions League: Slavia Prague; Viktoria Plzeň
- Europa League: Fastav Zlín; Sparta Prague; Mladá Boleslav
- Matches: 240
- Goals: 597 (2.49 per match)
- Top goalscorer: Milan Škoda; David Lafata (15 goals)
- Biggest home win: Jablonec 5–0 Jihlava
- Biggest away win: Příbram 1–8 Slavia
- Highest scoring: Příbram 1–8 Slavia
- All statistics correct as of 28 May 2017.

The 2016–17 Czech First League, known as the ePojisteni.cz liga for sponsorship reasons, was the 24th season of the Czech Republic's top-tier football league. Slavia Prague won the league, while defending champions Viktoria Plzeň finished in second place. The season began on 29 July 2016 and ended on 27 May 2017.

== Teams ==
=== Stadiums and locations ===
Location of teams in 2016–17 Czech First League

Club	Location	Stadium	Capacity	2015–16
Bohemians 1905	Prague	Ďolíček	5,000	9th
Dukla Prague	Prague	Stadion Juliska	8,150	10th
Hradec Králové	Hradec Králové	Všesportovní stadion	7,220	FNL, 2nd (promoted)
FK Jablonec	Jablonec nad Nisou	Stadion Střelnice	6,280	7th
Karviná	Karviná	Městský stadion	4,833	FNL, 1st (promoted)
FK Mladá Boleslav	Mladá Boleslav	Městský stadion (Mladá Boleslav)	5,000	4th
1. FK Příbram	Příbram	Na Litavce	9,100	14th
Slavia Prague	Prague	Eden Arena	20,800	5th
1. FC Slovácko	Uherské Hradiště	Městský fotbalový stadion Miroslava Valenty	8,121	8th
Slovan Liberec	Liberec	Stadion u Nisy	9,900	3rd
Sparta Prague	Prague	Generali Arena	19,416	2nd
FK Teplice	Teplice	Na Stínadlech	18,221	12th
Viktoria Plzeň	Plzeň	Stadion města Plzně	11,722	1st
Vysočina Jihlava	Jihlava	Stadion v Jiráskově ulici	4,075	11th
Zbrojovka Brno	Brno	Městský stadion (Brno)	12,550	6th
FC Fastav Zlín	Zlín	Letná Stadion	6,375	13th

=== Personnel and kits ===
Club	Manager	Captain	Kit manufacturer	Sponsors
Bohemians	(Czech Republic) Miroslav Koubek	(Czech Republic) Josef Jindřišek	Adidas	Remal
Dukla	(Czech Republic) Jaroslav Hynek	(Czech Republic) Marek Hanousek	Adidas	Carbounion
Hradec Králové	(Czech Republic) Milan Frimmel	(Czech Republic) Pavel Černý	Jako	
Jablonec	(Czech Republic) Zdeněk Klucký	(Czech Republic) Tomáš Hübschman	Nike	TipGames; ČPP
Karviná	(Czech Republic) Jozef Weber	(Czech Republic) Pavel Eismann	Adidas	
Mladá Bloleslav	(Czech Republic) Leoš Kalvoda	(Czech Republic) Lukáš Magera	Adidas	Škoda
Příbram	(Czech Republic) Petr Rada	(Czech Republic)	Nike	Energon Dobříš; TipGames
Slavia	(Czech Republic) Jaroslav Šilhavý	(Czech Republic) Jan Bořil	Umbro	CEFC China
Slovácko	(Czech Republic) Stanislav Levý	(Czech Republic)	Nike	Z-Group; SynotTip
Liberec	(Czech Republic) Jindřich Trpišovský	(Czech Republic) Lukáš Pokorný	Nike	Preciosa
Sparta	(Czech Republic) Zdeněk Svoboda	(Czech Republic) David Lafata	Nike	SynotTip
Teplice	(Czech Republic) Daniel Šmejkal	(Czech Republic) Štěpán Vachoušek	Umbro	AGC Glass; Speciální Stavby Most
Plzeň	(Slovakia) Roman Pivarník	(Czech Republic) Roman Hubník	Puma	Doosan
Jihlava	(Czech Republic) Michal Bílek	(Czech Republic) Lukáš Vaculík	Adidas	PSJ
Brno	(Czech Republic) Svatopluk Habanec	(Czech Republic) Pavel Zavadil	Nike	FlatStore
Zlín	(Czech Republic) Bohumil Páník	(Czech Republic) Tomáš Poznar	Adidas	Lukrom

=== Managerial changes ===
Team	Outgoing manager	Manner of departure	Date of vacancy	Position in table	Incoming manager	Date of appointment
Mladá Boleslav	(Czech Republic) Karel Jarolím	Mutual consent		1st	(Czech Republic) Leoš Kalvoda	
Příbram	(Czech Republic) Martin Pulpit	Sacked	22 August 2016	16th	(Czech Republic) Petr Rada	22 August 2016
Slavia Prague	(Czech Republic) Dušan Uhrin Jr.	Sacked	29 August 2016	10th	(Czech Republic) Jaroslav Šilhavý	5 September 2016
Dukla Prague	(Czech Republic) Jaroslav Šilhavý	Mutual consent	5 September 2016	13th	(Czech Republic) Jaroslav Hynek	15 September 2016
Jihlava	(Slovakia) Michal Hipp	Become assistant	14 September 2016	15th	(Czech Republic) Michal Bílek	14 September 2016
Sparta Prague	(Czech Republic) Zdeněk Ščasný	Sacked	26 September 2016	4th	(Czech Republic) Zdeněk Svoboda	24 November 2016
Jablonec	(Slovakia) Zdenko Frťala	Sacked	15 October 2016	11th	(Czech Republic) Zdeněk Klucký	5 December 2016
Mladá Boleslav	(Czech Republic) Leoš Kalvoda	Mutual consent	16 December 2016	5th	(Czech Republic) Martin Svědík	1 January 2017
Sparta Prague	(Czech Republic) Zdeněk Svoboda	Become assistant	21 December 2016	3rd	(Czech Republic) Tomáš Požár	21 December 2016
Příbram	(Czech Republic) Petr Rada	Resigned	7 January 2017	16th	(Czech Republic) Kamil Tobiáš	7 January 2017

== League table ==
Pos	Team	Pld	W	D	L	GF	GA	GD	Pts	Qualification or relegation
1	Slavia Prague (C)	30	20	9	1	65	22	+43	69	Qualification for the Champions League third qualifying round
2	Viktoria Plzeň	30	20	7	3	47	21	+26	67	Qualification for the Champions League third qualifying round
3	Sparta Prague	30	16	9	5	47	26	+21	57	Qualification for the Europa League third qualifying round
4	Mladá Boleslav	30	13	10	7	47	37	+10	49	Qualification for the Europa League second qualifying round
5	Teplice	30	13	9	8	38	25	+13	48	
6	Fastav Zlín	30	11	8	11	34	35	−1	41	Qualification for the Europa League group stage (Note: Fastav Zlín qualified for the Europa League group stage by winning the 2016–17 Czech Cup.)
7	Dukla Prague	30	11	7	12	39	35	+4	40	
8	Jablonec	30	9	12	9	43	38	+5	39 (Note: Head-to-head record: Slovan 1–1 Jablonec, Jablonec 3–0 Slovan.)	
9	Slovan Liberec	30	10	9	11	31	28	+3	39	
10	Karviná	30	9	7	14	39	49	−10	34	
11	Zbrojovka Brno	30	6	14	10	32	45	−13	32 (Note: Head-to-head record: Zbrojovka 1–0 Slovácko, Slovácko 0–0 Zbrojovka .)	
12	Slovácko	30	6	14	10	29	38	−9	32	
13	Bohemians 1905	30	7	7	16	22	39	−17	28	
14	Vysočina Jihlava	30	6	9	15	26	47	−21	27 (Note: Head-to-head record: Hradec 1–0 Jihlava, Jihlava 3–1 Hradec.)	
15	Hradec Králové (R)	30	8	3	19	29	51	−22	27	Relegation to FNL
16	Příbram (R)	30	6	4	20	29	61	−32	22	Relegation to FNL

Source: Fortuna liga, Soccerway
Rules for classification: 1) Points; 2) Head-to-head points; 3) Head-to-head goal difference; 4) Head-to-head goals scored; 5) Goal difference; 6) Goals scored; 7) Play-off (only if deciding champion, UEFA competitions, or relegation); 8) Draw.
(C) Champions; (R) Relegated

== Results ==
Home \ Away	B05	DUK	HRK	JAB	KAR	MLA	PŘI	SLA	SLK	LIB	SPA	TEP	VPL	JIH	ZBR	ZLN
Bohemians 1905	—	1–2	0–3	2–0	2–0	1–3	1–0	1–3	0–0	2–1	0–2	0–1	0–1	1–0	3–0	0–2
Dukla Prague	4–1	—	3–0	1–0	0–0	1–2	3–1	1–2	2–3	0–0	0–2	0–1	0–1	4–1	4–2	1–0
Hradec Králové	1–0	0–2	—	1–2	3–4	0–0	2–0	0–3	2–1	0–1	1–2	0–2	0–1	1–0	0–0	0–2
Jablonec	0–0	1–1	2–1	—	5–3	1–2	2–4	0–0	2–2	3–0	3–1	0–0	2–2	5–0	1–2	2–0
Karviná	3–0	2–1	4–2	0–2	—	1–1	2–0	1–2	0–1	0–0	1–1	1–4	2–3	3–0	1–1	1–0
Mladá Boleslav	1–1	1–0	2–0	0–0	1–2	—	2–2	1–2	3–0	3–0	1–0	1–1	0–0	3–1	3–3	1–2
Příbram	1–0	3–1	1–0	2–4	4–2	0–1	—	1–8	0–1	0–1	1–2	3–2	0–3	0–0	2–3	0–2
Slavia Prague	1–1	2–2	4–0	1–1	1–0	2–1	3–0	—	1–0	1–0	1–1	2–0	2–1	2–0	4–0	2–2
Slovácko	2–0	2–2	1–3	0–0	1–1	2–1	1–0	0–2	—	0–1	1–1	1–1	1–1	1–1	0–0	1–3
Slovan Liberec	4–1	3–1	2–0	1–1	2–0	4–0	2–1	1–1	2–2	—	0–0	2–0	1–2	1–1	0–0	0–0
Sparta Prague	1–0	1–0	3–2	3–0	3–0	2–2	4–0	0–2	3–2	1–0	—	2–1	2–0	3–0	3–2	0–0
Teplice	1–0	0–1	0–1	1–0	1–0	1–2	3–0	2–2	2–2	3–1	0–0	—	0–1	1–0	1–1	2–0
Viktoria Plzeň	1–1	2–0	4–1	3–1	2–0	3–3	1–0	3–1	2–0	1–0	1–0	2–2	—	2–0	2–0	0–2
Vysočina Jihlava	0–2	1–1	3–1	1–1	2–4	2–1	1–1	1–1	0–0	1–0	1–0	0–2	1–2	—	3–0	1–3
Zbrojovka Brno	0–0	0–0	1–1	2–0	1–1	2–3	2–2	1–4	1–0	1–0	3–3	0–0	0–1	1–1	—	2–0
Zlín	1–1	0–1	1–3	2–2	3–0	1–2	2–0	0–4	1–1	2–1	1–1	0–2	0–0	0–3	2–1	—

Source: Fortuna liga
Legend: Blue = home team win; Yellow = draw; Red = away team win.
For upcoming matches, an "a" indicates there is an article about the rivalry between the two participants.

== Top scorers ==
Rank	Player	Club	Goals
1	(Czech Republic) Milan Škoda	Slavia Prague	15
1	(Czech Republic) David Lafata	Sparta Prague	15
3	(Bosnia and Herzegovina) Muris Mešanović	Slavia Prague	12
4	(Czech Republic) Michal Krmenčík	Viktoria Plzeň	10
4	(Czech Republic) Michal Škoda	Zbrojovka Brno	10
6	(Czech Republic) Jan Chramosta	Mladá Boleslav	9
6	(Latvia) Dāvis Ikaunieks	Vysočina Jihlava	9
8	(Czech Republic) Tomáš Pilík	Příbram	8
8	(Australia) Golgol Mebrahtu	Mladá Boleslav	8
8	(Czech Republic) Marek Bakoš	Viktoria Plzeň	8
8	(Czech Republic) Martin Doležal	Jablonec	8
8	(Czech Republic) Martin Fillo	Teplice	8

== Attendances ==
These are the average attendances of all the top division teams.

Pos	Team	Total	High	Low	Average	Change
1	Slavia Prague	174,373	19,084	5,043	11,625	+30.9%
2	Viktoria Plzeň	150,606	11,651	8,812	10,040	−5.5%
3	Sparta Prague	150,216	18,397	7,109	10,014	+2.6%
4	Teplice	72,943	14,782	2,088	4,863	+6.0%
5	Zbrojovka Brno	68,552	9,223	2,918	4,570	−4.8%
6	Slovan Liberec	67,269	8,880	1,992	4,485	−7.9%
7	Bohemians 1905	65,659	5,000	3,504	4,373	−5.5%
8	Zlín	65,071	5,981	2,336	4,338	+1.0%
9	Slovácko	62,935	6,082	3,322	4,196	−10.6%
10	Karviná	58,083	4,833	2,912	3,872	+199.2%
11	Mladá Boleslav	50,242	5,000	1,280	3,346	+1.2%
12	Vysočina Jihlava	43,712	4,500	2,033	2,914	−7.6%
13	Jablonec	38,114	4,255	1,440	2,539	−10.2%
14	Příbram	37,179	5,962	1,118	2,478	−16.8%
15	Hradec Králové	33,786	4,561	1,146	2,324	+67.9%
16	Dukla Prague	32,983	6,243	542	2,199	−17.1%
	League total	1,171,723	19,084	542	4,882	−3.9%

Updated to games played on 2 July 2017
Source: World Football and European Football Statistics and fotbal.idnes.cz
Notes:
^{†}

== See also ==
- 2016–17 Czech Cup
- 2016–17 Czech National Football League
