= David Holoubek =

Czech football manager

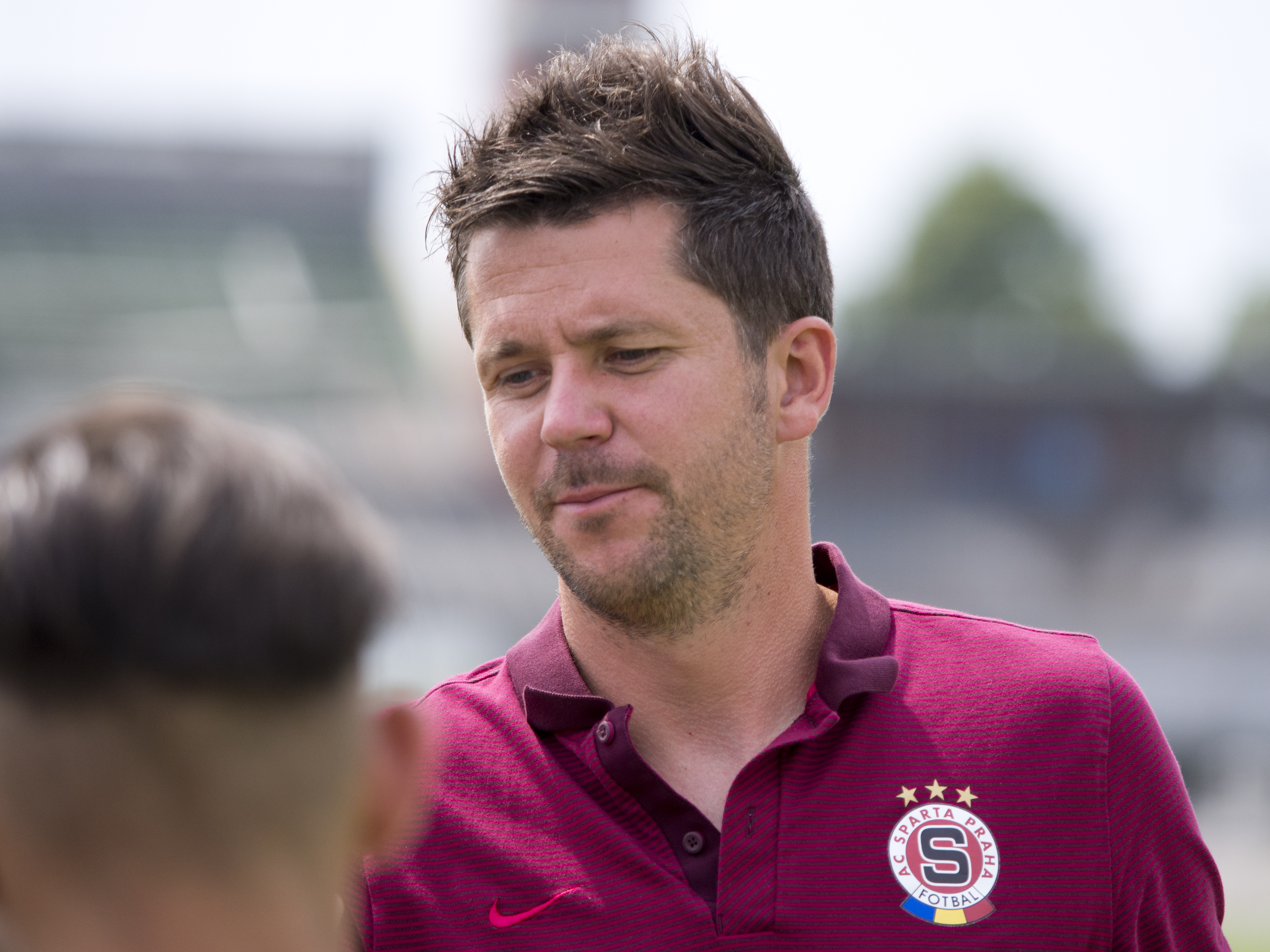
- Holoubek in 2016

Personal information
- Date of birth: 8 June 1980 (age 46)
- Place of birth: Humpolec, Czechoslovakia

Managerial career
- Years: Team
- 2001–2004: FK Humpolec
- 2004–2016: Sparta Prague (youth)
- 2016: Sparta Prague (assistant)
- 2016: Sparta Prague
- 2016–2017: Sparta Prague (assistant)
- 2017: Sparta Prague (youth)
- 2017–2018: Slovan Liberec
- 2018–2019: Ružomberok
- 2020–2021: Czech Republic U18
- 2021–2022: Czech Republic U19
- 2022–2023: Czech Republic U18
- 2023–2024: Czech Republic U19
- 2024: Mladá Boleslav
- 2025–2026: Dukla Prague

David Holoubek (born 8 June 1980) is a Czech football manager.

== Career ==
=== Early career ===
In his player career he played in the 3rd Czech league. His manager career started in Humpolec. He moved to Prague in 2004 for study sport in Charles University.

=== Sparta Prague ===
During his study he started in Sparta Prague as assistant in U15 team. As assistant of Petr Janoušek he trained Ladislav Krejčí, Jiří Skalák or Pavel Kadeřábek.

In 2012, he became head coach at Sparta's U19 team. In the 2015–16 season Sparta U19 won Czech 1st junior league.

In June 2016 he became assistant of Zdeněk Ščasný in Sparta's A-team (he was still coach of U19). In September 2016 head coach Ščasný was fired after losing the Prague derby against city rivals Slavia Prague with Holoubek becoming acting head coach. Due to not holding a UEFA Pro Licence, his tenure was limited to two months. In November 2016 he was formally replaced by Zdeněk Svoboda. On 21 December 2016, Sparta announced that club sport director Tomáš Požár became head coach and Holoubek first coach. After a poor run of results in March 2017, the whole coaching team was dissolved and Holoubek returned to Sparta's U17 team.

In June 2017 he announced on his Twitter account that he became an owner of UEFA Pro Licence.

=== Slovan Liberec ===
On 22 December 2017, Holoubek signed a contract with FC Slovan Liberec. In his coaching squad are former players Miroslav Holeňák, Jiří Jarošík and goalkeeper Marek Čech.

=== Ružomberok ===
On 4 June 2018, Holoubek signed a contract with MFK Ružomberok.

=== Czech Republic national team U18 ===
In February 2020 Holoubek became a manager of Czech Republic U18.

=== Czech Republic national team ===
On 6 September 2020, it was announced that Holoubek would take charge of the Czech Republic national team in their match against Scotland on the following day, as the entire squad and coaching staff which played against Slovakia on 4 September had to be replaced due to positive SARS-CoV-2 tests.

=== Mladá Boleslav ===
On 2 January 2024, Holoubek signed a contract with Mladá Boleslav.

=== Dukla Prague ===
On 16 June 2025, Holoubek was appointed as the manager of Dukla Prague. On 10 February 2026, Holoubek was sacked as the head coach of Dukla.
