= Florent Poulolo =

Martiniquais footballer (born 1997)

Personal information
- Full name: Florent Grégoire Poulolo
- Date of birth: 2 January 1997 (age 29)
- Place of birth: Fort-de-France, Martinique
- Height: 1.89 m (6 ft 2 in)
- Position: Centre-back

Team information
- Current team: Universitatea Cluj
- Number: 22

Youth career
- 2003–2012: Aiglon du Lamentin
- 2012–2013: INF Clairefontaine
- 2013–2014: Drancy
- 2014–2015: Arles-Avignon

Senior career*
Years	Team	Apps	(Gls)
2015	Arles-Avignon B	2	(0)
2015–2016	Arles-Avignon	4	(0)
2016–2018	Alès	43	(1)
2018–2020	Getafe B	50	(2)
2019–2020	Getafe	1	(0)
2020–2023	Sigma Olomouc	59	(3)
2023–2024	Mladá Boleslav	12	(0)
2024	→ České Budějovice (loan)	12	(0)
2024–2026	UTA Arad	63	(2)
2026–	Universitatea Cluj	8	(0)

International career^{‡}
2022–	Martinique	26	(0)
- * Club domestic league appearances and goals as of 7 November 2026 ‡ National team caps and goals as of 17 November 2026

Florent Grégoire Poulolo (born 2 January 1997) is a Martiniquais professional footballer who plays as a centre-back for Liga I club Universitatea Cluj and the Martinique national team.

== Club career ==
Born in Fort-de-France, Poulolo started his career with local side Aiglon du Lamentin FC, and moved to France at the age of 15 after joining INF Clairefontaine. He subsequently represented JA Drancy and AC Arles-Avignon, finishing his formation with the latter in 2015.

Poulolo made his senior debut with Arles' reserves during the 2015–16 season in the Championnat de France Amateur 2, while also appearing for the first team in the Championnat de France Amateur. However, the club was dissolved in October, and he joined Olympique Alès in June of the following year.

On 9 August 2018, Poulolo moved to Spanish side Getafe CF, being initially assigned to the B-team in Tercera División. He immediately became a regular starter for the side, contributing with four goals in 27 matches (play-offs included) and achieving promotion to Segunda División B; the last of his goals was in a 4–1 home routing of CD Lealtad in the play-offs, to overcome a 2–0 deficit in the first leg.

Poulolo made his first team debut for Geta on 18 December 2019, starting in a 2–1 away win against El Palmar CF for the season's Copa del Rey. His La Liga debut occurred the following 13 July, as he came on as a late substitute for Erick Cabaco in a 0–0 draw at Deportivo Alavés.

On 9 September 2020, Poulolo moved to Czech side Sigma Olomouc.

In June 2023, Poulolo moved to Czech side Mladá Boleslav. On 22 February 2024, Mladá Boleslav loaned Poulolo to Dynamo České Budějovice on a half-year loan deal without option to make transfer permanent.

== International career ==
Poulolo was called up to represent the Martinique team for a pair of friendlies in March 2022.

== Career statistics ==
=== Club ===
As of match played 7 November 2026

Appearances and goals by club, season and competition
Club	Season	League			National cup (Note: Includes Coupe de France, Copa del Rey, Czech Cup, Cupa României)		Europe		Other		Total	
Club	Season	Division	Apps	Goals	Apps	Goals	Apps	Goals	Apps	Goals	Apps	Goals
Arles-Avignon B	2015–16	CFA 2	2	0	—		—		—		2	0
Arles-Avignon	2015–16	Championnat de France Amateur	4	0	—		—		—		4	0
Alès	2016–17	CFA 2	19	0	0	0	—		—		19	0
Alès	2017–18	Championnat National 3	24	1	1	0	—		—		25	1
Alès	Total		43	1	1	0	—		—		44	1
Getafe B	2018–19	Tercera División	24	2	—		—		2 (Note: Appearances in Tercera División promotion play-offs)	1	26	3
Getafe B	2019–20	Segunda División B	26	0	—		—		—		26	0
Getafe B	Total		50	2	—		—		2	1	52	3
Getafe	2019–20	La Liga	1	0	1	0	0	0	—		2	0
Sigma Olomouc	2020–21	Czech First League	25	0	3	0	—		—		28	0
Sigma Olomouc	2021–22	Czech First League	18	2	4	0	—		3 (Note: Appearances in Czech First League European play-offs)	0	25	2
Sigma Olomouc	2022–23	Czech First League	16	1	3	0	—		—		19	1
Sigma Olomouc	Total		59	3	10	0	—		3	0	72	3
Mladá Boleslav	2023–24	Czech First League	13	0	3	1	—		—		16	1
Mladá Boleslav	2024–25	Czech First League	0	0	—		0	0	—		0	0
Mladá Boleslav	Total		13	0	3	1	0	0	—		16	1
České Budějovice (loan)	2023–24	Czech First League	12	0	—		—		2 (Note: Appearances in Czech First League promotion/relegation play-offs)	0	14	0
UTA Arad	2024–25	Liga I	30	1	3	0	—		—		33	1
UTA Arad	2025–26	Liga I	33	1	1	0	—		—		34	1
UTA Arad	Total		63	2	4	0	—		—		67	2
Universitatea Cluj	2026–27	Liga I	8	0	2	0	0	0	1 (Note: Appearances in Supercupa României)	0	11	0
Career total			255	8	21	1	0	0	8	1	284	10

=== International ===
As of match played 17 November 2026

Appearances and goals by national team and year
National team	Year	Apps	Goals
Martinique	2022	3	0
Martinique	2023	11	0
Martinique	2024	3	0
Martinique	2025	3	0
Martinique	2026	6	0
Total		26	0

== Honours ==
Getafe B

- Tercera División: 2018–19

Universitatea Cluj

- Supercupa României runner-up: 2026
