= Pablo González (footballer, born 1993) =

Spanish footballer

Personal information
- Full name: Pablo González Juárez
- Date of birth: 12 May 1993 (age 33)
- Place of birth: Almuñécar, Spain
- Height: 1.74 m (5 ft 9 in)
- Position: Midfielder

Team information
- Current team: Trenčín
- Number: 93

Youth career
- 2000–2006: Almuñécar 77
- 2006–2007: Granada Atlético
- 2007–2009: Atlético Madrid
- 2009–2011: Villarreal

Senior career*
Years	Team	Apps	(Gls)
2011–2012	Villarreal C	24	(4)
2012–2015	Villarreal B	67	(5)
2012–2015	Villarreal	2	(0)
2015–2016	Huesca	0	(0)
2015–2016	→ Toledo (loan)	32	(3)
2016–2017	Toledo	37	(2)
2017–2018	Granada B	32	(5)
2018–2019	Salamanca	17	(4)
2019	Dukla Prague	20	(4)
2019–2022	Sigma Olomouc	74	(13)
2022–2023	Hapoel Tel Aviv	6	(2)
2023–2024	Zlín	13	(0)
2024–2026	Ethnikos Achna	53	(9)
2026–	Trenčín	5	(1)
- * Club domestic league appearances and goals as of 05:18, 4 September 2026 (UTC)

Pablo González Juárez (born 12 May 1993) is a Spanish professional footballer who plays as a midfielder for Slovak First Football League club AS Trenčín.

== Club career ==
=== Villarreal ===
González was born in Almuñécar, Province of Granada, Andalusia, spending his last four years as a youth with Atlético Madrid and Villarreal CF (two seasons apiece). He started his senior career in 2011, appearing regularly for the C team in the Tercera División and making his senior debut on 7 September in a 3–0 away win against UD Juventud Barrio del Cristo. He scored his first goals for the side on 15 January of the following year, netting a brace in a 5–0 home victory over Mislata CF.

On 3 February 2012, González was called up by the reserves for a Segunda División game against FC Barcelona B, but remained unused in the 0–0 home draw. He played his first match as a professional on 28 April, coming on as a substitute for Moi Gómez in the 62nd minute of a 1–0 win at CD Numancia.

González was definitely promoted to the B team at the start of the 2012–13 campaign, now in Segunda División B. He made his first appearance for the main squad on 17 August 2012, replacing Cani in the 76th minute of an eventual 2–1 second-tier home defeat of Real Madrid Castilla.

In 2013–14, González appeared in preseason with the first team, but suffered a right knee injury which sidelined him for four months, which was followed by an inguinal hernia ailment. He was selected by manager Marcelino García Toral for the last match of the season against Real Sociedad, but eventually did not make the final cut. He recovered for the final months of the following campaign, his first game with the B's occurring on 3 May 2015 as he played 24 minutes in a 4–2 away win over Elche CF Ilicitano. He scored in the third match after his recovery, helping to a 2–2 home draw with group champions Gimnàstic de Tarragona.

=== Later career ===
González ended his contract with Villarreal in July 2015 and, on 28 August, joined third division club CD Toledo on loan from SD Huesca. He played his first game on 12 September, featuring 28 minutes in a 3–0 away win over SD Leioa, and the move was subsequently made permanent.

González spent the next two seasons still in the Spanish third tier, with Club Recreativo Granada and Salamanca CF UDS. He scored his first goal for the former on 10 September 2017, in a 1–0 away victory against Córdoba CF B.

On 16 January 2019, González signed a two-and-a-half-year deal with FK Dukla Prague of the Czech First League. He suffered relegation in June, but returned to the country's main division three months later with SK Sigma Olomouc.

González returned to the Czech top flight in October 2023, on a one-year contract at FC Zlín from Israeli Premier League's Hapoel Tel Aviv FC. He moved to the Cypriot First Division for the 2024–25 campaign, with Ethnikos Achna FC.

On 17 July 2026, aged 33, González signed a one-year contract with Slovak First Football League side AS Trenčín.
