= AURES Holdings =

- Industry: Automobile sales
- Founded: 7 June 2013
- Headquarters: Czech Republic
- Revenue: 1,012,856,000 euro (2022)
- Net income: 4,536,000 euro (2022)
- Total assets: 456,539,000 euro (2022)
- Number of employees: 3500
- Website: www.aaaauto.cz

AURES Holdings, a.s., runs the AAA AUTO used car outlets in the Czech Republic, where most of its business is located. It also has branches in Slovakia (AUTOCENTRUM AAA AUTO a.s.), Hungary and Poland (Autocentrum AAA AUTO sp.z o.o.). The firm has branches in 22 cities in the Czech Republic, 14 in Slovakia, 1 in Hungary and 11 in Poland. In September 2017, it recorded its two millionth customer.

== History ==
The firm's parent company, the Dutch AAA Auto Group N.V., went on the stock exchanges in Prague and Budapest in September 2007, with an initial price per share of CZK 55. Trading in the company's shares ended in the summer of 2013, when the company offered to buy back the shares for CZK 23.30 per share. Since 2014, the majority owner of the group has been a British-Polish private equity fund, Abris Capital Partners, which gradually acquired a 100% share for €220 million (about CZK 6 billion), roughly CZK 95 per share. Following the share buy-out, the Abris fund became the 100% owner of the group in June 2015. The companies in the group were then brought together in an international merger; the company's headquarters moved to the Czech Republic and the name changed to AAA Auto International a.s. and changed again to AURES Holdings, a.s. on 1 March 2018.

In 2016, he firm was ranked 48 in the "Czech TOP 100" listing (ranked by revenue). According to the audited earnings for 2016, it reported sales of €276,000,000 and sold 68,772 cars.

On 12 December 2025, AURES Holdings announced that EP Equity Investment, an investment firm led by Daniel Křetínský, will acquire 100% stake in AURES.

== Operations ==
Since 2012, it has also been offering cars under the Mototechna brand. In Czechia and Slovakia Mototechna concentrates on offering "nearly new" cars. In 2014, Mototechna started selling luxury cars in a premium segment. In 2013, a study by Ogilvy & Mather ranked the firm among the top ten Czech brands after November 1989. A study by Medea Research found Mototechna one of the most popular re-established Czech brands from before 1989. In January 2018, the company set up the AuresLab innovation laboratory, a start-up run by the executive director Stanislav Gálik.

The firm's business model is based on purchasing cars for cash, so that they are transferred directly to the company's ownership. This differs from the rest of the market (where typically used cars are sold predominantly in the form of commission sales). The firm provides a lifetime money-back guarantee on the cars it sells if there are legal problems with the vehicle's origins. It also provides car-life insurance for mechanical and electrical defects and the option of exchanging the car for another within seven days.

The AAA AUTO brand was awarded the Superbrands Award for 2017 and 2018 and came second in the European Business Awards 2016/2017. The AAA AUTO and Mototechna brands are the official partner of the Czech premier football league - the Fortuna League.
