= Matúš Macík =

Slovak footballer

Personal information
- Full name: Matúš Macík
- Date of birth: 19 May 1993 (age 33)
- Place of birth: Liptovský Mikuláš, Slovakia
- Height: 1.98 m (6 ft 6 in)
- Position: Goalkeeper

Team information
- Current team: Slovan Bratislava
- Number: 44

Youth career
- Tatran Liptovský Mikuláš

Senior career*
Years	Team	Apps	(Gls)
2012–2016	Tatran Liptovský Mikuláš	51	(0)
2015	→ Ružomberok (loan)	1	(0)
2016–2020	Ružomberok	119	(0)
2021–2025	Sigma Olomouc	56	(0)
2023–2024	→ Sigma Olomouc B	8	(0)
2025–	Slovan Bratislava	4	(0)
2025–	Slovan Bratislava B	7	(0)
- * Club domestic league appearances and goals as of 3 December 2025

Matúš Macík (born 19 May 1993) is a Slovak professional footballer who plays for Slovan Bratislava as a goalkeeper.

== Club career ==
He made his professional Slovak Super Liga debut for Ružomberok against Skalica on 18 July 2015.

== Career statistics ==
As of match played 3 December 2025

Appearances and goals by club, season and competition
Club	Season	League			National cup		Europe		Other		Total	
Club	Season	Division	Apps	Goals	Apps	Goals	Apps	Goals	Apps	Goals	Apps	Goals
Tatran Liptovský Mikuláš	2013–14	2. Liga	6	0	1	0	—		—		7	0
Tatran Liptovský Mikuláš	2014–15	2. Liga	32	0	0	0	—		—		32	0
Tatran Liptovský Mikuláš	2015–16	2. Liga	13	0	0	0	—		—		13	0
Tatran Liptovský Mikuláš	Total		51	0	0	0	—		—		51	0
Ružomberok (loan)	2015–16	Slovak First Football League	1	0	0	0	—		—		1	0
Ružomberok	2016–17	Slovak First Football League	25	0	0	0	6 (Note: Appearances in UEFA Europa League)	0	—		31	0
Ružomberok	2017–18	Slovak First Football League	31	0	4	0	6	0	—		41	0
Ružomberok	2018–19	Slovak First Football League	30	0	0	0	—		—		30	0
Ružomberok	2019–20	Slovak First Football League	16	0	5	0	—		—		21	0
Ružomberok	2020–21	Slovak First Football League	17	0	0	0	1	0	—		18	0
Ružomberok	Total		119	0	9	0	13	0	—		141	0
Sigma Olomouc	2020–21	Czech First League	3	0	1	0	—		—		4	0
Sigma Olomouc	2021–22	Czech First League	26	0	0	0	—		—		26	0
Sigma Olomouc	2022–23	Czech First League	13	0	0	0	—		—		13	0
Sigma Olomouc	2023–24	Czech First League	14	0	1	0	—		—		15	0
Sigma Olomouc	Total		56	0	2	0	—		—		58	0
Sigma Olomouc B	2022–23	Czech National Football League	2	0	—		—		—		2	0
Sigma Olomouc B	2024–25	Czech National Football League	6	0	—		—		—		6	0
Sigma Olomouc B	Total		8	0	—		—		—		8	0
Slovan Bratislava B	2024–25	2. Liga	5	0	0	0	0	0	—		5	0
ŠK Slovan Bratislava	2025–26	Slovak First Football League	4	0	0	0	0	0	—		4	0
Career total			244	0	12	0	13	0	0	0	269	0
