= Lukáš Vaculík (footballer) =

Czech footballer

Personal information
- Date of birth: 6 June 1983 (age 43)
- Place of birth: Brno, Czechoslovakia
- Height: 1.80 m (5 ft 11 in)
- Position: Midfielder

Senior career*
Years	Team	Apps	(Gls)
2000–2005	FC Vysočina Jihlava	68	(3)
2005	→ Mladá Boleslav (loan)	9	(1)
2005–2007	Mladá Boleslav	29	(4)
2005	→ Kroměříž (loan)	11	(1)
2007	Příbram	9	(1)
2008	Trnava	6	(1)
2008	Plzeň	8	(1)
2009–2010	Žižkov	35	(4)
2010–2020	FC Vysočina Jihlava	149	(12)
2010	→ Nea Salamis (loan)		

International career^{‡}
1998	Czech Republic U-15	3	(0)
2000–2001	Czech Republic U-17	7	(0)
2001–2002	Czech Republic U-19	10	(1)
- * Club domestic league appearances and goals as of 1 June 2014 ‡ National team caps and goals as of 31 December 2011

Lukáš Vaculík (born 6 June 1983) is a former Czech football player who last played for Vysočina Jihlava. He has represented his country at youth international level.
