= Martin Hála =

Czech footballer (born 1992)

Personal information
- Full name: Martin Hála
- Date of birth: 24 March 1992 (age 34)
- Place of birth: Czechoslovakia
- Height: 1.75 m (5 ft 9 in)
- Position: Defender

Youth career
- –2010: Sigma Olomouc

Senior career*
Years	Team	Apps	(Gls)
2011–2022	Sigma Olomouc	166	(15)
2013	→ Slovácko (loan)	4	(0)
2013	→ Nitra (loan)	10	(0)
2014	→ České Budějovice (loan)	4	(1)
2022–2024	Bohemians 1905	42	(4)

International career^{‡}
2012	Czech Republic U20	1	(0)
2012	Czech Republic U21	1	(0)
- * Club domestic league appearances and goals as of 20 June 2024 ‡ National team caps and goals as of 22 December 2014

Martin Hála (born 24 March 1992) is a Czech footballer who plays as defender.

== Honours ==
SK Sigma Olomouc

- Czech Cup: 2011–12
