= Zdeněk Klucký =

Czech footballer and manager

Personal information
- Date of birth: 5 November 1960 (age 65)
- Place of birth: Czechoslovakia
- Position: Defender

Senior career*
Years	Team	Apps	(Gls)
1984–1990	RH Cheb	121	(4)
- FK Pelikán Děčín

Managerial career
- 1995–1999: FK Jablonec (assistant)
- 1999–2000: FK Jablonec
- 2000–2001: FK Teplice (assistant)
- 2003–2007: FK Jablonec (assistant)
- 2007–2010: FK Teplice (assistant)
- 2011–2014: FC Slovan Liberec (assistant)
- 2014–2016: FK Jablonec (assistant)
- 2016–2017: FK Jablonec
- 2017–2022: FK Jablonec (assistant)
- * Club domestic league appearances and goals

Zdeněk Klucký (born 5 November 1960) is a Czech football manager and former player. He managed FK Jablonec in the 1999–2000 Gambrinus liga.

== Playing career ==
During his days as a player, Klucký played for clubs including RH Cheb in the Czechoslovak First League and FK Pelikán Děčín. As a defender, Klucký made 121 league appearances and scored 4 goals for Cheb.

== Coaching career ==
Klucký joined FK Jablonec as an assistant coach in 1995. After spending four years at Jablonec as an assistant, he was appointed caretaker manager of Jablonec following the departure of manager Július Bielik in September 1999. He became manager on a permanent basis in October that year.

With Jablonec bottom of the league in March 2000, Klucký left his position.

He went on to work as assistant to Petr Rada at FK Teplice, joining in May 2000.

Rada again chose him as his assistant when both men moved to FK Jablonec in October 2003, and when Rada returned to Teplice in June 2007, Klucký went with him. Klucký left Teplice after the 2009–10 Gambrinus liga.

In 2011, Klucký joined FC Slovan Liberec as assistant to manager Jaroslav Šilhavý.
