= Radim Breite =

Czech footballer

Personal information
- Date of birth: 10 August 1989 (age 37)
- Place of birth: Krupka, Czechoslovakia
- Height: 1.75 m (5 ft 9 in)
- Position: Midfielder

Team information
- Current team: Karviná
- Number: 6

Youth career
- Hvězda Trnovany
- Teplice

Senior career*
Years	Team	Apps	(Gls)
2008–2009	Teplice	1	(0)
2009–2010	Arsenal Česká Lípa		
2010	Zenit Čáslav	9	(0)
2011–2015	Varnsdorf	85	(10)
2015–2016	Teplice	29	(2)
2016–2020	Slovan Liberec	104	(9)
2020–2026	Sigma Olomouc	181	(5)
2026	Artis Brno	13	(0)
2026–	Karviná	0	(0)

International career
2020	Czech Republic	1	(0)
- * Club domestic league appearances and goals as of 24 May 2026

Radim Breite (born 10 August 1989) is a Czech professional footballer who plays as a midfielder for Karviná.

== Club career ==
Breite began his professional football career in the Czech First League with FK Teplice. After rarely featuring for Teplice's first team, he spent four seasons in the second division with FK Varnsdorf. By early 2016, Breite had returned to Teplice, and joined rivals FC Slovan Liberec as a mid-season replacement for David Pavelka.

On 17 January 2026, Breite signed a contract with Czech National Football League club Artis Brno.

On 30 July 2026, Breite signed a contract with Czech National Football League club Karviná.

== International career ==
Breite earned selection for the Czech Republic national football team in September 2020, after several players dropped out of the initial squad due to the COVID-19 pandemic. He made his international debut as a substitute on 7 September 2020 in a home match played at the Andrův stadion in Olomouc against Scotland.

== Career statistics ==
=== International ===
As of 7 September 2020

Czech Republic
Year	Apps	Goals
2020	1	0
Total	1	0

== Honours ==
Sigma Olomouc

- Czech Cup: 2024–25
