= Juraj Chvátal =

Slovak international footballer

Personal information
- Full name: Juraj Chvátal
- Date of birth: 13 July 1996 (age 30)
- Place of birth: Malacky, Slovakia
- Height: 1.80 m (5 ft 11 in)
- Position: Right back

Team information
- Current team: Hradec Králové
- Number: 30

Youth career
- TJ Slavoj Moravský Svätý Ján
- TJ Družstevník Závod
- 2011–2014: Senica

Senior career*
| Years | Team | Apps | (Gls) |
| 2014–2015 | Senica | 20 | (0) |
| 2015 | → Sparta Prague (loan) | 1 | (0) |
| 2016–2018 | Sparta Prague | 0 | (0) |
| 2015–2016 | → Slovácko (loan) | 18 | (0) |
| 2016–2017 | → Slovácko (loan) | 7 | (0) |
| 2017–2018 | → Žilina (loan) | 21 | (0) |
| 2018–2025 | Sigma Olomouc | 101 | (8) |
| 2019 | → Železiarne Podbrezová (loan) | 15 | (1) |
| 2025– | Hradec Králové | 4 | (0) |

International career^{‡}
| 2013 | Slovakia U17 | 5 | (1) |
| 2014 | Slovakia U18 | 2 | (0) |
| 2015 | Slovakia U19 | 3 | (0) |
| 2015–2018 | Slovakia U21 | 8 | (0) |
| 2022– | Slovakia | 1 | (0) |
- * Club domestic league appearances and goals as of 5 February 2026 ‡ National team caps and goals as of 06:53, 7 June 2022 (UTC)

Juraj Chvátal (born 13 July 1996) is a Slovak professional footballer who plays as a defender for Hradec Králové.

== Club career ==
Chvátal started his career at TJ Slavoj Moravský Svätý Ján. He made his professional debut for Senica against Dukla Banská Bystrica on 8 March 2014.

On 9 September 2025, Chvátal signed a contract with Hradec Králové.

== Honours ==
Sigma Olomouc

- Czech Cup: 2024–25
