= Tomáš Požár =

Czech footballer (born 1975)

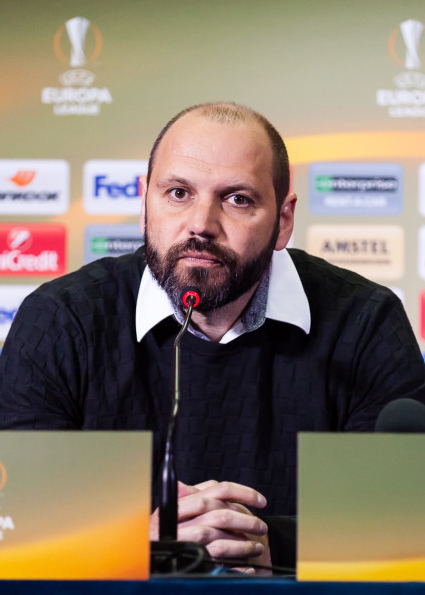

Personal information
- Date of birth: 9 September 1975 (age 51)
- Place of birth: Czechoslovakia
- Position: Defender

Senior career*
Years	Team	Apps	(Gls)
1994–1996	Sparta Prague	28	(0)
1996–2001	Jablonec	43	(0)
1996–1997	→ Teplice (loan)	1	(0)

International career
1994	Czech Republic U18	1	(0)
1996	Czech Republic U21	5	(0)

Managerial career
- 2016–2017: AC Sparta Prague
- * Club domestic league appearances and goals

Tomáš Požár (born 9 September 1975) is a retired Czech football defender. He played in the Gambrinus liga for numerous clubs, making over 50 league appearances in total. In 2012, he was working as sporting director for the youth team of Bohemians 1905. In 2015, he became chief of scouting at AC Sparta Prague and in October 2016 Sparta's new sporting director.

Požár played international football at under-21 level for Czech Republic U21.
