= Václav Jílek =

Czech association football player

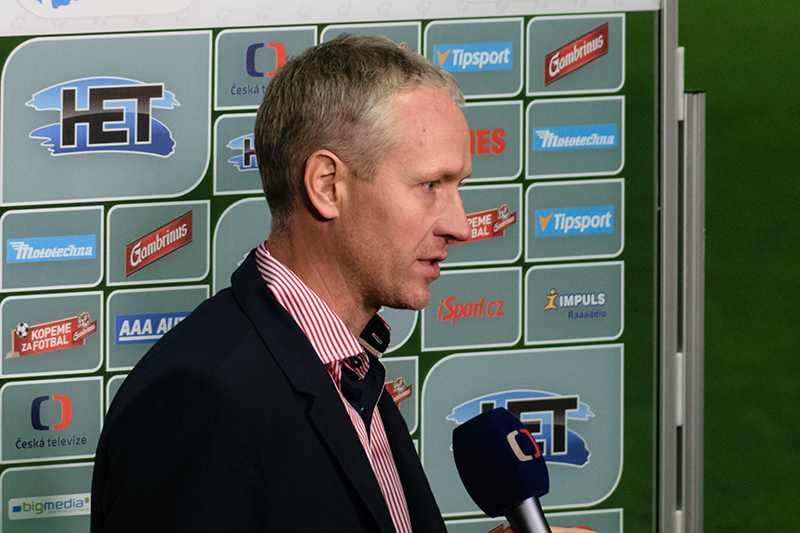

Personal information
- Date of birth: 16 May 1976 (age 50)
- Place of birth: Litomyšl, Czechoslovakia

Managerial career
- Years: Team
- 2009–2011: Czech Republic U19 (assistant)
- 2011–2015: Sparta Prague (assistant)
- 2015–2018: Czech Republic U21 (assistant)
- 2015–2019: Olomouc
- 2019–2020: Sparta Prague
- 2021–2024: Olomouc
- 2024–2025: Czech Republic U18
- 2025–: Czech Republic U19

Václav Jílek (born 16 May 1976) is a Czech football manager.

Previously working for Sparta Prague and various Czech national teams as an assistant manager, he assumed his first spell as a first team manager at Olomouc in October 2015, replacing Leoš Kalvoda. Despite failing to avoid relegation from the Czech First League in his first season with the club, he retained his position for the 2016–17 Czech National Football League campaign. On 3 May 2017, Olomouc secured their return into the top flight with a 4–1 victory at Znojmo, after which Jílek was offered a new contract to continue his role at the club and signed to stay for another year. The newly promoted team finished fourth in the top league and qualified for the 2018–19 UEFA Europa League under his leadership, an achievement that won Jílek the Czech Manager of the Year award. In April 2019, being both the youngest and the longest-serving Czech First League manager at the time, he signed a new two-year contract with the club. On 30 May 2019, Jílek joined Sparta Prague, signing a three-year contract. On 18 February 2020 Jílek was dismissed from the position of first team head coach.

== Honours ==
=== Managerial ===
SK Sigma Olomouc

- Czech National Football League: 2016-17
