= 1996–97 Czech Cup =

Pohár ČMFS

Tournament details
- Country: Czech Republic

Final positions
- Champions: Slavia Prague
- Runners-up: FC Dukla

The 1996–97 Czech Cup was the fourth edition of the annual football knockout tournament organized by the Czech Football Association of the Czech Republic.

Slavia Prague prevailed at the 15 June 1997 Cup and qualified for the 1997–98 UEFA Cup Winners' Cup.

== Teams ==
Round	Clubs remaining	Clubs involved	Winners from previous round	New entries this round	Leagues entering at this round
Preliminary round	130	40	none	40	Levels 4 and 5 in football league pyramid
First round	112	96	20	76	Czech 2. Liga; Bohemian Football League; Moravian-Silesian Football League; Czech Fourth Division
Second round	64	64	48	16	Czech First League
Third round	32	32	32	none	none
Fourth round	16	16	16	none	none
Quarter finals	8	8	8	none	none
Semi finals	4	4	4	none	none
Final	2	2	2	none	none

== Preliminary round ==
Team 1	Score	Team 2
Olymp Prague	1–3	Aritma Prague
Pišely	2–0	Smíchov
Sokol Čížová	2–0	Horažďovice
Jiskra Třeboň	4–0	Tabor
Rokycany	3–0	Plzeň 1894
Sokol Sveradice	0–0 (a.e.t.); 3-4 pen	Sušice
Slovan Hrádek nad Nisou	1–1 (a.e.t.); 3-2 pen	Slovan Varnsdorf
Slovan Pardubice	2–2 (a.e.t.); 2-4 pen	Mogul Kolín
Spartak Rychnov	2–0	Agria Choceň
Zeman Brno	2–0	Žďas Žďár nad Sázavou
Bopo Třebíč	1–3	Roubina Dolni Kounice
Židenice Brno	1–2	ČKD Blansko
Slovan Broumov	1–2	Dolní Němčí
Dolní Bojanovice	3–1	Hodonín
Šumperk	1–1 (a.e.t.); 4-3 pen	Slavoj Bruntál
Holice	0–0 (a.e.t.); 4-2 pen	UNO Zábřeh-Zvole
Valašské Meziříčí	1–1 (a.e.t.); 4-3 pen	Nový Jičín
Detmarovice	5–2	Důl 9. květen Albrechtice
Biocel Vratimov	1–0	Slezan Frýdek-Místek
Sokol Trnava	0–3	VTE Spartak Hulín

== Round 1 ==
Team 1	Score	Team 2
Tatran Kadaň	0–0 (a.e.t.); 4-3 pen	Slavia Karlovy Vary
Litvínov	0–3	Chomutov
Sokol Brozany	0–4	GGS Arma Ústí
Český Lev Neštěmice	1–1 (a.e.t.); 6-7 pen	MUS Most 1996
Slovan Hrádek nad Nisou	0–3	Pelikán Děčín
Lokomotiva Kladno	1–0	Chmel Blšany
Kaučuk Kralupy nad Vltavou	w/o	Mělník
Aritma Prague	1–3	Rakovnik
Kladno	4–3	Patenidis Motorlet Prague
Rokycany	5–3	Tahov
Tatran Prachatice	3–1	Slavoj Český Krumlov
Přeštice	1–2	1. FC Plzeň
Jiskra Třeboň	1–1 (a.e.t.); 5-3 pen	Agrox Vlašim
Horažďovice	1–5	FC Dukla
Pišely	1–0	AFK Kolín
Mladá Boleslav	0–1	Brummer Ceska Lipa
Spolana Neratovice	0–0 (a.e.t.); 6-5 pen	Admira Prague
Chrudim	0–0 (a.e.t.); 2-4 pen	Český Brod
Libuš	0–3	Sparta Krč
Králův Dvůr	2–3	Horní Počernice
Střížkov Prague 9	2–2 (a.e.t.); 4-5 pen	Turnov
Sokol Semice	3–3 (a.e.t.); 2-4 pen	Bohemians Prague
Benešov	1–1 (a.e.t.); 4-2 pen	Slavoj Vyšehrad
Mogul Kolín	0–4	Chrudim
Spartak Rychnov	3–1	Pardubice
Olympia Hradec Králové	0–3	Trutnov
Holice 1932	0–4	Lázně Bohdaneč
Hanácká Slavia Kroměříž	2–2 (a.e.t.); 5-4 pen	Zlín
Detmarovice	1–1 (a.e.t.); 4-53 pen	NH Ostrava
ARTEP Město Albrechtice	w/o	Krnov
ŽD Bohumín	2–2 (a.e.t.); 3-5 pen	Baník Havířov
Valašské Meziříčí	0–5	Železárny Třinec
Dukla Hranice	3–2	Hranice
Biocel Vratimov	0–3	Vítkovice
MSA Dolní Benešov	2–0	Frýdek-Místek
Holice	0–5	Přerov
Šumperk	1–1 (a.e.t.); 6-5 pen	UNEX Uničov
Dolní Němčí	1–2	Uherský Brod
Synot Staré Město	0–2	Uherské Hradiště
VMG Kyjov	1–1 (a.e.t.); 2-4 pen	Baník Ratíškovice
Kunovice	2–1	Veselí nad Moravou
VTE Spartak Hulín	1–1 (a.e.t.); 3-4 pen	Alfa Valašské Klobouky
Dolní Bojanovice	0–6	Tatran Poštorná
ČKD Blansko	0–4	LeRK Prostějov
Zeman Brno	3–1	PSJ Motorpal Jihlava
Svitavy	2–0	Mohelnice-Moravčany
Roubina Dolni Kounice	2–1	Znojmo
Sušice	2–3	Vodňany

== Round 2 ==
Team 1	Score	Team 2
Benešov	0–2	Bohemians Prague
Tatran Kadaň	1–4	Slavia Prague
Chomutov	1–1 (a.e.t.); 4-5 pen	GGS Arma Ústí
MUS Most 1996	2–2 (a.e.t.); 2-4 pen	Teplice
Lokomotiva Kladno	0–2	Pelikán Děčín
Tatran Poštorná	2–2 (a.e.t.); 8-7 pen	Uherské Hradiště
Kaučuk Kralupy nad Vltavou	0–2	Viktoria Žižkov
Rakovnik	3–3 (a.e.t.); 3-0 pen	Kladno
Vodňany	1–12	České Budějovice
Jiskra Třeboň	0–1	FC Dukla
ARTEP Město Albrechtice	1–1 (a.e.t.); 3-5 pen	Kaučuk Opava
Dukla Hranice	2–1	Hanácká Slavia Kroměříž
Sparta Krč	4–4 (a.e.t.); 4-5 pen	Horní Počernice
Turnov	0–3	Jablonec
Chrudim	0–1	Sparta Prague
Spartak Rychnov	4–2	Trutnov
Lázně Bohdaneč	4–2	Hradec Králové
Svitavy	0–0 (a.e.t.); 2-4 pen	Šumperk
Baník Ratíškovice	0–3	Petra Drnovice
Kunovice	2–1	Alfa Valašské Klobouky
MSA Dolní Benešov	1–3	Baník Ostrava
Přerov	2–0	Baník Havířov
Rokycany	0–4	Viktoria Plzeň
Tatran Prachatice	1–1 (a.e.t.); 5-6 pen	1. FC Plzeň
Pišely	0–1	Liberec
Spolana Neratovice	1–1 (a.e.t.); 4-5 pen	Brummer Ceska Lipa
NH Ostrava	1–2	Karviná
Vítkovice	1–1 (a.e.t.); 7-8 pen	Železárny Třinec
Uherský Brod	1–2	Sigma Olomouc
Zeman Brno	1–2	LeRK Prostějov
Roubina Dolni Kounice	1–5	Boby Brno
Český Brod	w/o	Union Cheb

== Round 3 ==
Matches were played on 28 August 1996.

Team 1	Score	Team 2
Pelikán Děčín	1–1 (a.e.t.); 6-5 pen	Teplice
GGS Arma Ústí	1–3	Slavia Prague
Rakovnik	0–2	Viktoria Žižkov
FC Dukla	2–0	České Budějovice
Dukla Hranice	1–4	Kaučuk Opava
Šumperk	1–3	Lázně Bohdaneč
Kunovice	1–4	Petra Drnovice
Přerov	1–2	Baník Ostrava
Brummer Ceska Lipa	0–1	Liberec
Železárny Třinec	3–0	Karviná
LeRK Prostějov	1–3	Sigma Olomouc
Horní Počernice	1–2	Český Brod
Jablonec	1–1 (a.e.t.); 4-3 pen	Bohemians Prague
Tatran Poštorná	0–1	Boby Brno
Spartak Rychnov	0–6	Sparta Prague
1. FC Plzeň	0–2	Viktoria Plzeň

== Round 4 ==
The fourth round was played on 15 and 16 April 1997.

Team 1	Score	Team 2
FC Dukla	1–0	Kaučuk Opava
Český Brod	0–2	Jablonec
Pelikán Děčín	0–5	Slavia Prague
Boby Brno	0–0 (a.e.t.); 4-3 pen	Viktoria Žižkov
Petra Drnovice	0–1	Baník Ostrava
Viktoria Plzeň	2–0	Liberec
Železárny Třinec	2–2 (a.e.t.); 5-6 pen	Sigma Olomouc
Lázně Bohdaneč	1–3	Sparta Prague

== Quarterfinals ==
The quarterfinals were played on 29 and 30 April, and 7 May 1997.

Team 1	Score	Team 2
Sparta Prague	0–1 (a.e.t.)	Baník Ostrava
FC Dukla	1–0	Viktoria Plzeň
Slavia Prague	2–0	Jablonec
Sigma Olomouc	0–0 (a.e.t.); 4-2 pen	Boby Brno

== Semifinals ==
The semifinals were played on 13 and 14 May 1997.

Team 1	Score	Team 2
Baník Ostrava	2–3	Slavia Prague
FC Dukla	1–0	Sigma Olomouc

== Final ==
15 June 1997
14:30 CEST

Slavia Prague	1–0 (a.e.t.)	FC Dukla
Vácha 101'

Stadion Evžena Rošického, Prague
Attendance: 8,236
Referee: Lubomír Puček

== See also ==
- 1996–97 Czech First League
- 1996–97 Czech 2. Liga
