= 1997–98 Czech Cup =

Pohár ČMFS

Tournament details
- Country: Czech Republic
- Teams: 134

Final positions
- Champions: Jablonec
- Runners-up: Petra Drnovice

The 1998–99 Czech Cup was the fifth edition of the annual football knockout tournament organized by the Czech Football Association of the Czech Republic.

Jablonec prevailed at the 9 June 1998 Cup and qualified for the 1998–99 UEFA Cup Winners' Cup.

== Teams ==
Round	Clubs remaining	Clubs involved	Winners from previous round	New entries this round	Leagues entering at this round
Preliminary round	134	44	none	44	Levels 4 and 5 in football league pyramid
First round	112	96	22	74	Czech 2. Liga; Bohemian Football League; Moravian-Silesian Football League; Czech Fourth Division
Second round	64	64	48	16	Czech First League
Third round	32	32	32	none	none
Fourth round	16	16	16	none	none
Quarter finals	8	8	8	none	none
Semi finals	4	4	4	none	none
Final	2	2	2	none	none

== Preliminary round ==
44 teams took part in the preliminary round.

Team 1	Score	Team 2
Uhelné sklady	3–1	Králův Dvůr
Benátky nad Jizerou	2–3	Vyšehrad
TJ AKRA České Budějovice	0–1	FK Horažďovice
Klatovy	0–1	SK Plzeň 1894
FK Seko Louny	3–0	1. FC Karlovy Vary
TJ Sokol Deštné v Orlických horách	0–0	SK Holice
Čechie Karlín	1–3	Roudnice
FK Říčany	1–1	FSC Libuš
Čelákovice	1–2	SK Smíchov
Karlovy Vary – Dvory	3–1	AC Lučan Žatec
FK IZOS Libočany	2–0	SK Sokol Brozany
FC Spartak Rychnov nad Kněžnou	1–0	FK Pardubice
FC Svinov	0–1	Nový Jičín
BOPO Třebíč	7–1	Žďár nad Sázavou
FC Spartak Velká Bíteš	0–0	Dosta Bystrc
FCS Sokol Mysločovice	3–3	FC Dukla SEKOPT Hranice
1. FC Polešovice	6–1	TJ Dolní Němčí
FC Velké Karlovice	2–3	FC Trnava
FK Technoplast Chropyně	2–1	Kroměříž
SK Hodolany	1–1; 2-4 pen	Šumperk
FC Slavoj Olympia Bruntál	1–1	FK ARTEP Město Albrechtice
SK Rapid Muglinov	4–1	Valašské Meziříčí

== Round 1 ==
74 teams entered the competition at this stage. Along with the 22 winners from the preliminary round, these teams played 48 matches to qualify for the second round.

Team 1	Score	Team 2
Kralupy	3–1	Admira/Slavoj
M. Louny	0–2	Blšany
Kadaň	0–4	Horní Počernice
Karlovy Vary – Dvory	1–3	Chomutov
SK Kladno	1–1; 5-3 pen	Aritma Prague
Litvínov	1–2	Ústí nad Labem
FK Tábor	2–0	Milín
Neštěmice	1–2	Děčín
Mogul Kolín	4–0	Semice
Libočany	1–3	Most
Rakovník	1–2	Motorlet
SK Plzeň 1894	0–5	1. FC Plzeň
Horažďovice	1–2	Třeboň
Smíchov	0–4	Bohemians
Dropa ČKD	0–2	Mladá Boleslav
Vyšehrad	0–3	Neratovice
Přeštice	0–1	Tachov
Český Dub	2–1	Mělník
Roudnice	0–3	Česká Lípa
Uhelné sklady	0–3	Sparta Krč
Sušice	1–4	Prachatice
Rychnov n.K.	2–1	Pardubice 1899
Choceň	1–1; 9-8 pen	Český Brod
Holice	0–0; 2-4 pen	SK Chrudim
AFK Chrudim	0–0; 3-1 pen	Trutnov
Říčany	3–1	Vodňany
Varnsdorf	2–1	Turnov
Bopo Třebíč	0–4	Jihlava
Velká Bíteš	1–4	Zeman Brno
ČAFC Židenice	1–2	Znojmo
Dol. Kounice	1–0	Poštorná
Veselí n. M.	3–1	Uh. Brod
Brumov	1–1; 6-5 pen	Kyjov
Polešovice	2–5	Staré Město
Trnava	1–1; 3-4 pen	Zlín
Chropyně	1–4	Ratíškovice
Svitavy	0–1	Uničov
Kunovice	1–1; 2-4 pen	Uh.Hradiště
Holice	2–2; 2-4 pen	Prostějov
Šumperk	1–5	Přerov
Mysločovice	0–3	SK Hranice
Zábřeh	1–4	Krnov
Bruntál	1–4	Dol. Benešov
Vratimov	1–1; 6-5 pen	NH Ostrava
Bohumín	0–4	Karviná
Důl Albrechtice	0–4	Třinec
Muglinov	0–5	Vítkovice
Nový Jičín	1–5	Frýdek/Místek

== Round 2 ==
Team 1	Score	Team 2
Mladá Boleslav	1–0	Sparta Prague
Chomutov	1–4	Blšany
Prachatice	0–5	FC Dukla
Mogul Kolín	2–0	Horní Počernice
Krnov	1–0	Sigma Olomouc
SK Hranice	1–1; 3-2 pen	Přerov
Vratimov	0–2	Baník Ostrava
Karviná	4–1	Třinec
Tachov	0–3	Viktoria Plzeň
Říčany	1–3	1. FC Plzeň
FK Tábor	0–3	České Budějovice
Sparta Krč	1–2	Bohemians
Ústí nad Labem	0–5	Teplice
Český Dub	1–3	Česká Lípa
Varnsdorf	1–5	Jablonec
Vítkovice	1–0	Frýdek/Místek
Zeman Brno	0–3	Boby Brno
Jihlava	9–0	Znojmo
SK Chrudim	1–1; 4-1 pen	Hradec Králové
SK Kladno	0–3	Neratovice
Děčín	1–0	Liberec
Motorlet	1–2	Most
Kralupy	0–2	Viktoria Žižkov
Uničov	1–2	Uh.Hradiště
Dol. Benešov	0–1	Opava
Veselí n. M.	0–4	Staré Město
Prostějov	0–3	Petra Drnovice
Dol. Kounice	0–2	Brumov
Choceň	1–4	Bohdaneč
AFK Chrudim	4–1	Rychnov n.K.
Třeboň	1–3	Slavia Prague
Ratíškovice	0–1	Zlín

== Round 3 ==
Team 1	Score	Team 2
Mladá Boleslav	1–2	Blšany
Mogul Kolín	1–3	FC Dukla
SK Hranice	3–0	Krnov
Karviná	1–1; 2-4 pen	Baník Ostrava
1. FC Plzeň	0–2	Viktoria Plzeň
Bohemians	3–2	České Budějovice
Česká Lípa	0–1	Teplice
Vítkovice	0–3	Jablonec
Jihlava	0–4	Boby Brno
Neratovice	3–0	SK Chrudim
Děčín	0–4	Most
Uh.Hradiště	1–2	Viktoria Žižkov
Staré Město	1–3	Opava
Brumov	0–3	Petra Drnovice
AFK Chrudim	1–1; 6-5 pen	Bohdaneč
Zlín	0–1	Slavia Prague

== Round 4 ==
The fourth round was played on 7 and 8 April 1998.

Team 1	Score	Team 2
Blšany	1–1; 4-5 pen	FC Dukla
SK Hranice	1–2	Baník Ostrava
Bohemians	0–1	Viktoria Plzeň
Teplice	1–5	Jablonec
Neratovice	1–2	Boby Brno
Most	1–1; 5-4 pen	Viktoria Žižkov
Opava	0–1	Petra Drnovice
AFK Chrudim	0–3	Slavia Prague

== Quarterfinals ==
The quarterfinals were played on 29 April 1998.

Team 1	Score	Team 2
Boby Brno	1–1; 4-2 pen	Baník Ostrava
Most	1–2	Jablonec
Petra Drnovice	2–1 (a.e.t.)	FC Dukla
Slavia Prague	1–0	Viktoria Plzeň

== Semifinals ==
The semifinals were played on 5 and 6 May 1998.

Team 1	Score	Team 2
Petra Drnovice	2–0	Slavia Prague
Jablonec	1–0 (a.e.t./g.g.)	Boby Brno

== Final ==
9 June 1998
16:20 CEST

Jablonec	2–1 (a.e.t./g.g.)	Petra Drnovice
Hromádko 73'; Kohout 102'		Kafka 65' (pen.)

Stadion Evžena Rošického, Prague
Attendance: 8,285
Referee: Lubomír Puček

== See also ==
- 1997–98 Czech First League
- 1997–98 Czech 2. Liga
