= 1996–97 Czech First League =

4th season of top-tier football league in Czech Republic

Czech First League
- Season: 1996–97
- Champions: Sparta Prague
- Relegated: Karviná; Bohemians Prague
- Champions League: Sparta Prague
- Cup Winners' Cup: Slavia Prague
- UEFA Cup: Jablonec; Boby Brno
- Matches: 240
- Goals: 571 (2.38 per match)
- Top goalscorer: Horst Siegl (19)
- Biggest home win: Drnovice 6–0 Bohemians Prague; Sparta Prague 6–0 Jablonec
- Biggest away win: Bohemians Prague 2–5 Drnovice; Drnovice 1–4 Slavia Prague; Drnovice 0–3 Č. Budějovice; Hradec Králové 0–3 Sparta Prague
- Highest scoring: Č. Budějovice 5–4 Teplice
- Highest attendance: 44,120; Brno 1–1 Slavia Prague (2 October 1996)
- Lowest attendance: 1,288; Bohemians Prague 0–0 Žižkov (11 June 1997)
- Average attendance: 7,155

The 1996–97 Czech First League was the fourth season of top-tier football in the Czech Republic. The season saw a Czech league attendance record for a single match, as 44,120 watched the game between Boby Brno and Slavia Prague.

== League changes ==
Relegated to the 1996–97 Czech 2. Liga

- Svit Zlín (15th)
- Uherské Hradiště (16th)

Dissolved after the 1995–96 Czech First League

- Union Cheb (bankruptcy; 13th)

Promoted from the 1995–96 Czech 2. Liga

- Bohemians Prague (4th)
- Karviná (1st)
- Teplice (2nd)

== Stadiums and locations ==
Location of clubs in the 1996–97 Czech First League

== League table ==
Pos	Team	Pld	W	D	L	GF	GA	GD	Pts	Qualification or relegation
1	Sparta Prague (C)	30	19	8	3	61	20	+41	65	Qualification for Champions League second qualifying round
2	Slavia Prague	30	18	7	5	59	24	+35	61	Qualification for Cup Winners' Cup first round
3	Jablonec	30	17	5	8	40	29	+11	56	Qualification for UEFA Cup first qualifying round
4	Boby Brno	30	14	10	6	44	35	+9	52	Qualification for UEFA Cup first qualifying round
5	Slovan Liberec	30	12	10	8	33	30	+3	46	
6	České Budějovice	30	11	11	8	38	40	−2	44	
7	Drnovice	30	12	7	11	53	44	+9	43	
8	Sigma Olomouc	30	10	10	10	36	30	+6	40	
9	Kaučuk Opava	30	10	10	10	34	35	−1	40	
10	Baník Ostrava	30	8	13	9	33	35	−2	37	
11	Viktoria Plzeň	30	7	11	12	33	37	−4	32	
12	Viktoria Žižkov	30	6	11	13	17	33	−16	29	
13	Teplice	30	6	10	14	21	37	−16	28	
14	Hradec Králové	30	5	13	12	22	39	−17	28	
15	Karviná (R)	30	6	7	17	25	50	−25	25	Relegation to Czech 2. Liga
16	Bohemians Prague (R)	30	4	7	19	22	53	−31	19	Relegation to Czech 2. Liga

Source: Fortuna liga
Rules for classification: 1) points; 2) head-to-head points; 3) head-to-head goal difference; 4) head-to-head goals scored; 5) goal difference; 6) number of goals scored.
(C) Champions; (R) Relegated

== Results ==
Home \ Away	OST	BRN	BOH	ČBU	DRN	HRK	JAB	KAR	OPA	OLO	SLA	LIB	SPA	TEP	PLZ	VŽI
Baník Ostrava		1–1	1–1	3–2	1–1	2–0	0–1	3–1	1–0	0–0	1–0	0–0	1–1	3–1	1–1	3–0
Boby Brno	3–2		3–1	2–1	4–1	1–1	3–0	5–1	2–0	1–0	1–1	1–1	2–1	0–0	2–0	1–1
Bohemians Prague	0–1	1–1		1–1	2–5	1–2	0–1	0–2	1–2	1–3	0–2	0–0	0–1	0–1	2–2	0–0
České Budějovice	2–1	2–1	2–1		2–1	1–1	0–0	2–0	0–1	3–1	1–1	1–1	0–0	5–4	2–2	1–0
Drnovice	5–2	2–0	6–0	0–3		1–1	2–1	4–0	2–1	0–0	1–4	1–3	0–2	1–0	4–1	4–0
Hradec Králové	2–0	0–0	1–0	1–1	2–2		0–2	3–1	0–0	0–1	1–2	0–1	0–3	1–0	0–0	0–0
Jablonec	3–3	4–1	2–0	2–0	1–1	2–0		1–0	2–1	3–1	1–0	1–0	1–0	0–0	3–0	3–1
Karviná	1–1	1–3	0–1	1–2	1–1	0–0	2–1		1–1	2–1	1–0	1–1	1–2	2–0	1–1	0–1
Kaučuk Opava	3–0	0–0	4–0	1–1	2–0	1–1	1–0	1–0		1–2	1–1	2–0	0–2	3–1	0–2	1–0
Sigma Olomouc	1–1	0–1	0–0	1–1	2–1	5–1	4–2	3–0	1–1		0–1	1–0	0–0	1–1	3–0	3–1
Slavia Prague	2–0	4–0	4–2	3–0	3–0	4–1	2–1	5–1	1–1	3–0		1–2	1–1	3–0	2–1	2–0
Slovan Liberec	1–1	1–2	2–0	0–2	1–0	4–1	1–0	1–0	2–2	1–1	2–3		0–2	0–0	1–0	0–0
Sparta Prague	1–0	5–0	3–4	5–0	2–2	1–0	6–0	2–2	5–1	2–1	1–1	3–0		4–2	2–0	1–0
Teplice	0–0	1–2	1–0	0–0	1–3	2–1	0–1	0–2	1–0	0–0	1–0	1–2	0–1		1–1	1–0
Viktoria Plzeň	0–0	1–0	0–1	4–0	2–1	0–0	0–1	3–0	5–1	1–0	0–1	2–3	1–1	1–1		1–1
Viktoria Žižkov	1–0	1–1	0–2	1–0	0–1	1–1	0–0	1–0	1–1	1–0	2–2	1–2	0–1	0–0	2–1	

Source: Fortuna liga
Legend: Blue = home team win; Yellow = draw; Red = away team win.

== Top goalscorers ==
Rank	Player	Club	Goals
1	(Czech Republic) Horst Siegl	Sparta Prague	19
2	(Czech Republic) Karel Vácha	Slavia Prague	14
3	(Czech Republic) Radek Drulák	Petra Drnovice	13
3	(Czech Republic) Alois Grussmann	Kaučuk Opava	13
5	(Czech Republic) Vratislav Lokvenc	Sparta Prague	12
6	(Slovakia) Jozef Majoroš	Petra Drnovice	11
6	(Czech Republic) Jan Saidl	České Budějovice	11
6	(Czech Republic) Ladislav Fujdiar	České Budějovice	11
6	(Czech Republic) Martin Rozhon	Kaučuk Opava / Petra Drnovice	11

== Attendances ==
No.	Club	Average	Change	Highest
1	Boby Brno	21,659	76,3%	44,120
2	Opava	12,273	20,9%	15,350
3	Karviná	8,240	73,7%	11,624
4	Teplice	7,661	77,2%	15,147
5	Sparta Praha	7,486	45,0%	15,109
6	Slavia Praha	6,724	11,0%	12,228
7	Jablonec	6,139	14,4%	9,136
8	Sigma Olomouc	5,588	7,4%	10,387
9	Drnovice	5,426	-2,0%	9,200
10	Slovan Liberec	5,188	5,1%	7,151
11	Baník Ostrava	5,102	134,0%	8,745
12	Bohemians Praha	4,727	107,9%	9,100
13	Viktoria Plzeň	4,626	34,4%	12,048
14	Viktoria Žižkov	4,573	59,6%	8,060
15	České Budějovice	4,522	55,8%	7,721
16	Hradec Králové	4,384	-0,7%	10,980

== See also ==
- 1996–97 Czech Cup
- 1996–97 Czech 2. Liga
