= Pavel Horváth =

Czech footballer

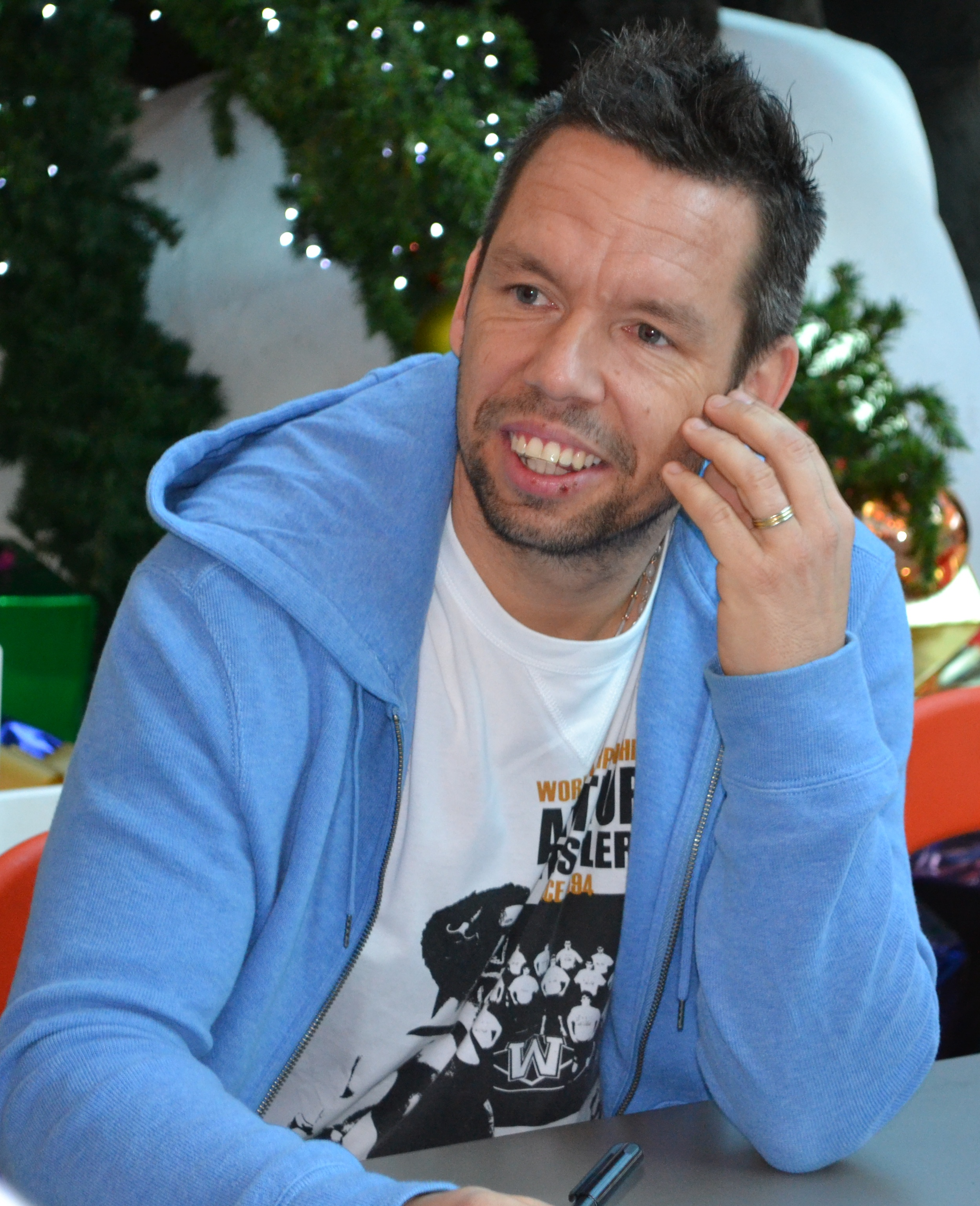
- Horváth in 2012

Personal information
- Date of birth: 22 April 1975 (age 51)
- Place of birth: Prague, Czechoslovakia
- Height: 1.78 m (5 ft 10 in)
- Position: Midfielder

Youth career
- 1980–1981: TJ Břevnov
- 1981–1994: Sparta Prague

Senior career*
Years	Team	Apps	(Gls)
1993	Sparta Prague	1	(0)
1994–1996	Jablonec 97	51	(8)
1996–2000	Slavia Prague	105	(27)
2000–2001	Sporting CP	19	(1)
2001	Galatasaray	3	(0)
2002–2004	Teplice	64	(6)
2004–2006	Vissel Kobe	60	(12)
2006–2008	Sparta Prague	48	(2)
2008–2015	Viktoria Plzeň	170	(35)
Total		521	(91)

International career
1995–1997	Czech Republic U21	10	(1)
1999–2002	Czech Republic	19	(0)

Managerial career
- 2015: Jiskra Domažlice
- 2015–2017: Viktoria Plzeň (assistant)
- 2016–2017: Viktoria Plzeň (youth)
- 2017–2018: Baník Sokolov
- 2019–2020: Viktoria Plzeň B
- 2020–2021: Příbram
- 2021–2023: Viktoria Plzeň (assistant)
- 2023–2024: Jiskra Domažlice
- 2024–2026: Baník Most-Souš
- * Club domestic league appearances and goals

Pavel Horváth (Czech pronunciation: [ˈpavɛl ˈɦorvaːt]; Hungarian: Horváth Pál; born 22 April 1975) is a Czech former professional footballer who played as a midfielder, and a football manager. He was in charge of Příbram.

He spent the better part of his 22-year professional career with Slavia Prague (four years), Teplice (three) and Viktoria Plzeň (seven), amassing Czech First League totals of 435 games and 78 goals during 19 seasons. He also competed professionally in Portugal, Turkey and Japan.

Horvath was a Czech international for three years.

== Club career ==
After making his professional debut with AC Sparta Prague, Prague-born Horváth moved to lowly FK Jablonec in search of more opportunities, which led to a return to the capital with SK Slavia, scoring 27 goals in the league alone in four seasons, although the club only managed to win two national cups during that timeframe.

Horváth's exploits with Slavia earned him a transfer to Sporting Clube de Portugal, but he failed to win a place in the starting XI. Sold in January 2002 to Galatasaray S.K. alongside teammate Mbo Mpenza, he also appeared very rarely, which prompted a return home before 2001–02 was over, with FK Teplice, where he conquered the domestic cup in his first full campaign.

After three years in Japan Horváth moved back to Sparta for two more seasons, where he won the national championship for the first time in 2007, adding the 2007 and 2008 Czech Cups. Subsequently, aged 33, he signed for FC Viktoria Plzeň, netting eight times during the 2008–09 season as the club finished in eighth place.

Horváth won the domestic cup for the sixth time with his fourth different team, as he captained Viktoria to its first title in the competition in 2010. He was also named the Personality of the League at the Czech Footballer of the Year awards in that year.

Thirty-five-year-old Horváth continued to produce in the 2010–11 season, scoring eight goals in 26 games as Plzeň was crowned league champion the first time in its history.

=== Controversy ===
In September 2007, Horváth was fined 200,000 Czech koruna for apparently performing the Nazi salute during Sparta's league match against FK Viktoria Žižkov. He apologized for the incident, and said that his gesture was misinterpreted, claiming he was only trying to calm down his team's rowdies.

== International career ==
Horváth made his debut for the Czech Republic on 9 February 1999 in a 1–0 friendly win in Belgium, going on to amass 19 caps in three years and being selected for UEFA Euro 2000, where he did not play.

His international career was vastly barred by the talent of fellow midfielders Patrik Berger, Pavel Nedvěd and Vladimír Šmicer.

== Coaching career ==
Horváth became the manager of FC Viktoria Plzeň's U21 squad in October 2016 simultaneously with his assistant manager role for the first team of the club.

After one year as the manager of FK Baník Sokolov, Horváth returned to Viktoria Plzeň and was hired as the U21 manager again. This was announced on 4 January 2019.

On 11 March 2020 Horváth became manager of Czech First League club Příbram. On 15 March 2021, Horváth was sacked as the head coach of Příbram after series of poor results (39 matches, 8 wins, 5 draws, 19 losses) with team on last place of league table.

On 27 June 2023, Horváth became manager of Bohemian Football League club Jiskra Domažlice.

On 1 October 2024, Horváth became manager of Bohemian Football League club Baník Most-Souš.

== Career statistics ==
=== Club ===
Club	Season	League		Cup		Europe		Other (Note: Other tournaments include the Supertaça Cândido de Oliveira and the Czech Supercup.)		Total	
Club	Season	Apps	Goals	Apps	Goals	Apps	Goals	Apps	Goals	Apps	Goals
Sparta Prague	1993–94	1	0	0	0	–		–		1	0
Sparta Prague	Total	1	0	0	0	0	0	0	0	1	0
Jablonec	1993–94	4	0	0	0	–		–		4	0
Jablonec	1994–95	26	5	0	0	–		–		26	5
Jablonec	1995–96	20	3	0	0	–		–		20	3
Jablonec	1996–97	1	0	0	0	–		–		1	0
Jablonec	Total	51	8	0	0	0	0	0	0	51	8
Slavia Prague	1996–97	25	5	0	0	4	1	–		29	6
Slavia Prague	1997–98	25	5	0	0	4	0	–		29	5
Slavia Prague	1998–99	29	7	1	1	3	0	–		33	8
Slavia Prague	1999–00	26	10	0	0	9	1	–		35	11
Slavia Prague	Total	105	27	1	1	20	2	0	0	126	30
Sporting	2000–01	16	1	2	0	4	0	3	0	25	1
Sporting	2001–02	3	0	0	0	0	0	–		3	0
Sporting	Total	19	1	2	0	4	0	3	0	28	1
Galatasaray	2001–02	3	0	–		–		–		3	0
Galatasaray	Total	3	0	0	0	0	0	0	0	3	0
Teplice	2001–02	17	1	0	0	–		–		17	1
Teplice	2002–03	25	2	0	0	2	2	–		27	4
Teplice	2003–04	22	3	0	0	4	1	–		26	4
Teplice	Total	64	6	0	0	6	3	0	0	70	9
Vissel Kobe	2004	14	6	–		–		–		14	6
Vissel Kobe	2005	24	3	–		–		–		24	3
Vissel Kobe	2006	22	3	–		–		–		22	3
Vissel Kobe	Total	60	12	0	0	0	0	0	0	60	12
Sparta Prague	2006–07	20	2	1	1	–		–		21	3
Sparta Prague	2007–08	28	0	4	0	7	0	–		39	0
Sparta Prague	Total	48	2	5	1	7	0	0	0	60	3
Viktoria Plzeň	2008–09	27	8	0	0	–		–		27	8
Viktoria Plzeň	2009–10	28	5	1	0	–		–		29	5
Viktoria Plzeň	2010–11	26	8	4	2	2	0	1	0	33	10
Viktoria Plzeň	2011–12	29	5	1	0	13	1	0	0	43	6
Viktoria Plzeň	2012–13	28	4	2	0	15	5	–		45	9
Viktoria Plzeň	2013–14	25	4	6	0	15	3	0	0	46	7
Viktoria Plzeň	2014–15	7	1	3	0	2	0	1	0	13	1
Viktoria Plzeň	Total	170	35	17	2	47	9	2	0	236	46
Career Total		521	91	24	4	84	14	5	0	634	109

=== International ===
Czech Republic
Year	Apps	Goals
1999	6	0
2000	8	0
2001	2	0
2002	3	0
Total	19	0

== Honours ==
=== Club ===
Sparta Prague

- Czech First League: 1993-1994, 2006–07
- Czech Cup: 2006–07, 2007–08

FK Jablonec

- Czech National Football League: 1993-1994
- Czech First League: 3rd Place: 1995-1996, 1996-1997

Slavia Prague

- Czech Cup: 1996–97, 1998–99
- Czech First League 2nd Place: 1996-1997, 1997-1998, 1999-2000
- Czech First League 3rd Place: 1998-1999

Sporting

- Supertaça Cândido de Oliveira: 2000
- Primeira Liga: 2001–02
- Primeira Liga 3rd Place: 2000-2001

Galatasaray S.K.

- Süper Lig: 2001-2002

Teplice

- Czech Cup: 2002–03

Viktoria Plzeň

- Czech First League: 2010–11, 2012–13, 2014–15
- Czech Cup: 2009–10
- Czech Supercup: 2011

=== Individual ===
- Czech First League top assist provider: 1997-1998, 2007-2008, 2010-2011

=== Records ===
- Czech First League most assists (106)
- Czech First League fastest hattrick (8 minutes)
- Czech First League most penalties taken (41)
- Czech First League most penalty goals scored (34)
