= Pavel Mareš =

Czech footballer (born 1976)

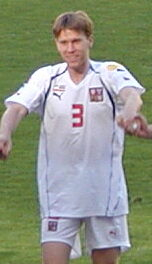
- Mareš in 2004

Personal information
- Full name: Pavel Mareš
- Date of birth: 18 January 1976 (age 50)
- Place of birth: Gottwaldov, Czechoslovakia
- Height: 1.85 m (6 ft 1 in)
- Positions: Centre-back; left-back

Youth career
- 1994–1995: Jiskra Otrokovice
- 1995–1996: VTJ Hulín
- 1996–1997: Baník Ratíškovice

Senior career*
Years	Team	Apps	(Gls)
1997–1999	Svit Zlín	54	(5)
1999–2001	Bohemians Prague	58	(3)
2001–2002	Sparta Prague	20	(3)
2003–2006	Zenit Saint Petersburg	92	(10)
2007–2009	Sparta Prague	2	(0)
2007–2009	Sparta Prague B	38	(0)
2009	→ Vysočina Jihlava (loan)	3	(0)
2009	Viktoria Žižkov	2	(0)
2010	Přední Kopanina		
Total		269	(21)

International career
2002–2006	Czech Republic	10	(0)
Medal record
Men's football
Representing Czech Republic
UEFA European Championship
Bronze medal – third place	2004 Portugal
- * Club domestic league appearances and goals

Pavel Mareš (born 18 January 1976) is a Czech former professional footballer who played as a defender at either centre-back or left-back. He played top-league football in the Czech Republic for Bohemians Prague and Sparta Prague, and played for Zenit Saint Petersburg in the Russian Football Premier League. At Zenit he was part of the only team to ever win the Russian Premier League Cup in 2003 and was recognised as one of the Premier League's best players in his position the following season through the Best 33 in the Russian Football Championship.

Mareš made ten appearances for the Czech Republic national football team between 2002 and 2006. He played at Euro 2004 as his nation reached the semi-final stage of the competition. Mareš also travelled to Germany as part of the national team for the 2006 FIFA World Cup.

== Club career ==
=== Early career ===
Mareš started his football journey with Jiskra Otrokovice, VTJ Hulín and Baník Ratíškovice. He played for Czech 2. Liga side FC Svit Zlín before moving to Prague in 1999. He first played top-level football with Bohemians Prague in the 1999–2000 season, and was reported to have signed for Slovan Liberec in June 2000, although he never transferred to the club and remained a Bohemians player. Mareš was part of his side's good start to the 2001–02 season, where they led the league before the first international break of the season. In August 2001, he scored an injury-time winner for Bohemians in their 1–0 victory against Drnovice.

Mareš signed for Sparta Prague in December 2001 as a replacement for defender Vladimír Labant, who subsequently left the club. Mareš sustained an ankle injury in his second match for Sparta Prague, which caused him to be unavailable for Sparta's UEFA Champions League game against Porto in March 2002. Mareš scored in the 2002–03 UEFA Champions League qualifying rounds; after hitting the post in the first half, he scored his team's fourth goal in a 4–2 win against Belgian side Genk, although Sparta exited the competition on the away goals rule, with the game's aggregate score being 4–4. In December 2002, Sparta rejected an approach from Russian side Zenit Saint Petersburg to sign Mareš. In spite of that, Zenit's Czech manager Vlastimil Petržela, who had been manager when Mareš played for Bohemians, made Mareš his third Czech signing later the same month.

=== Russia ===
From 2003 to 2006, Mareš played for Zenit Saint Petersburg. He scored his first goal for that club in July 2003 in a 2–2 draw against Krylia Sovetov Samara. In September 2003, he played in the 3–0 first leg win in the final of the Russian Premier League Cup against Chernomorets, with his club winning the competition by a 5–2 aggregate scoreline. In November 2003, Mareš scored in the fifth round of the 2003–04 Russian Cup, finishing his team's third goal in a 6–2 win against third-tier side FC KAMAZ Naberezhnye Chelny. During his time in St. Petersburg, the club finished second in the 2003 Russian Premier League and reached the quarter finals of the 2005–06 UEFA Cup. Following the 2004 season, the Russian Football Union named Mareš in the Best 33 in the Russian Football Championship among the league's top three left-backs.

In the 2006 season, Mareš suffered an ankle injury, causing him to miss matches in March and April. Following Dick Advocaat's appointment as Zenit's manager that season, Mareš played much less than before as Advocaat brought his own players into the team. In August 2006, Mareš agreed to a contract to play for English club Bolton Wanderers, however the deal was not completed, with his agent citing a failed medical as the reason for the breakdown. In January 2007, he left Zenit despite another year remaining on his contract.

=== Return to the Czech Republic ===
Mareš returned to Sparta Prague on a two-and-a-half-year contract in January 2007 as the club's first signing of the winter transfer window. He went on to play two league matches for Sparta in the 2006–07 season but none in 2007–08. He spent the first half of the 2008–09 season in the Czech 2. Liga playing for Sparta's reserve team, which he captained. He transferred to Vysočina Jihlava, which played in the same league, midway through the season. Mareš spent six months in Jihlava before leaving the club at the end of the season, citing its failure to win promotion to the Czech First League as his reason for doing so. During his time in Jihlava, injuries limited him to two appearances for the club.

In the summer of 2009, Mareš was one of nine players to join Viktoria Žižkov, as the club prepared to return to the top league following their relegation. This move again reunited him with manager Vlastimil Petržela, but injuries restricted him to two appearances in the first half of the 2009–10 season. Later in 2010, Mareš played for FC Přední Kopanina in the Czech Fourth Division.

== International career ==
Mareš first played for the Czech Republic in 2002, and later returned to the national team before a friendly match against Japan in April 2004, having played in no international matches since the February 2002 tournament in Cyprus. Having just three international caps, Mareš was included in the Czech Republic's squad for Euro 2004. At the tournament, at which his nation reached the semi-finals, his only appearance came in a group match against Germany, among a group of players the BBC described as "very much a Czech second string". Mareš was part of the Czech Republic squad for the 2006 FIFA World Cup, but did not play in the tournament. He finished his career having played ten matches for the Czech Republic between 2002 and 2006.

== Playing style ==
Although described as a midfielder early in his career, Mareš became known as a defender who could play as a centre-back or left-back. Following his nomination for the Czech Republic's 2006 World Cup squad, Reuters described Mareš as "reliable backup to Jankulovski [who was his nation's first-choice in the same position], but less supporting in the attack". Vysočina Jihlava director Zdeněk Tulis described Mareš as an "honest player".

== Personal life ==
Mareš' parents are called Jindřiška and Bohuslav. He has an older brother, Jan, with whom he grew up. Mareš has a daughter, Linda, and a son, Dominik.

After concluding his professional football career in 2009, Mareš spent time real estate investing before establishing his own company called SportClient, supporting professional sportspeople in their transition from being full-time sports professionals to their non-playing future.

== Career statistics ==
=== Club ===
Club performance			League		Cup		League Cup		Continental		Total	
Season	Club	League	Apps	Goals	Apps	Goals	Apps	Goals	Apps	Goals	Apps	Goals
Czech Republic			League		Czech Cup		League Cup		Europe		Total	
1996–97	Zlín	Czech 2. liga	8	0			—		—		8	0
1997–98	Zlín	Czech 2. liga	18	2			—		—		18	2
1998–99	Zlín	Czech 2. liga	15	2			—		—		15	2
1998–99	Bohemians 1905	Czech 2. liga	13	1			—		—		13	1
1999–2000	Bohemians 1905	Czech First League	13	0			—		—		13	0
2000–01	Bohemians 1905	Czech First League	29	2			—		—		29	2
2001–02	Bohemians 1905	Czech First League	16	1			—		—		16	1
2001–02	Sparta Prague	Czech First League	10	1			—				10	1
2002–03	Sparta Prague	Czech First League	10	2			—				10	2
Russia			League		Russian Cup		Russian Premier League Cup		Europe		Total	
2003	Zenit Saint Petersburg	Russian Premier League	26	2							26	2
2004	Zenit Saint Petersburg	Russian Premier League	28	3			—				28	3
2005	Zenit Saint Petersburg	Russian Premier League	26	4			—				26	4
2006	Zenit Saint Petersburg	Russian Premier League	12	1			—				12	1
Czech Republic			League		Czech Cup		League Cup		Europe		Total	
2006–07	Sparta Prague	Czech First League	2	0			—				2	0
2007–08	Sparta Prague B	Bohemian Football League	19	0			—		—		19	0
2008–09	Sparta Prague B	Czech 2. liga	19	0			—		—		19	0
2008–09	Vysočina Jihlava	Czech 2. liga	3	0			—		—		3	0
2009–10	Viktoria Žižkov	Czech 2. liga	2	0			—		—		2	0
Total	Czech Republic		177	11							177	11
Total	Russia		92	10							92	10
Career total			269	21							269	21

=== International ===
Czech Republic national team
Year	Apps	Goals
2002	2	0
2004	5	0
2005	1	0
2006	2	0
Total	10	0

== Honours ==
Zenit Saint Petersburg

- Russian Premier League Cup: 2003

Individual

- Best 33 in the Russian Football Championship: 2004
