= 1998–99 Czech First League =

6th season of top-tier football league in Czech Republic

Czech First League
- Season: 1998–99
- Champions: Sparta Prague
- Relegated: Viktoria Plzeň; Karviná
- Champions League: Sparta Prague; Teplice
- UEFA Cup: Slavia Prague; Sigma Olomouc
- Intertoto Cup: Boby Brno; Hradec Králové
- Matches: 240
- Goals: 625 (2.6 per match)
- Top goalscorer: Horst Siegl (18)
- Biggest home win: Ostrava 5–0 Slavia Prague; Sparta Prague 5–0 Karviná; Sparta Prague 5–0 Žižkov
- Biggest away win: Žižkov 1–6 Sparta Prague
- Highest scoring: Drnovice 4–4 Sparta Prague
- Highest attendance: 24,400; Brno 0–0 Olomouc
- Lowest attendance: 22; Drnovice 0–2 Teplice
- Average attendance: 6,033

The 1998–99 Czech First League, known as the Gambrinus liga for sponsorship reasons, was the sixth season of top-tier football in the Czech Republic. The season started on 2 August 1998.

== League changes ==
Relegated to the 1998–99 Czech 2. Liga

- České Budějovice (15th)
- Lázně Bohdaneč (16th)

Promoted from the 1997–98 Czech 2. Liga

- Blšany (1st)
- Karviná (2nd)

== Stadia and locations ==
Location of clubs in the 1998–99 Czech First League

== League table ==
Pos	Team	Pld	W	D	L	GF	GA	GD	Pts	Qualification or relegation
1	Sparta Prague (C)	30	17	9	4	62	23	+39	60	Qualification for Champions League group stage
2	Teplice	30	16	7	7	55	30	+25	55	Qualification for Champions League third qualifying round
3	Slavia Prague	30	15	10	5	51	31	+20	55	Qualification for UEFA Cup first round (Note: Slavia Prague won the 1998–99 Czech Cup and qualified for the first round of the UEFA Cup.)
4	Sigma Olomouc	30	12	11	7	42	34	+8	47	Qualification for UEFA Cup qualifying round
5	Baník Ostrava	30	10	15	5	39	26	+13	45	
6	Blšany	30	12	6	12	48	44	+4	42	
7	Boby Brno	30	11	8	11	37	33	+4	41	Qualification for Intertoto Cup second round
8	Hradec Králové	30	11	6	13	33	40	−7	39	Qualification for Intertoto Cup first round
9	Slovan Liberec	30	9	11	10	33	34	−1	38	
10	Viktoria Žižkov	30	11	5	14	31	47	−16	38	
11	Drnovice	30	9	10	11	35	44	−9	37	
12	Jablonec	30	9	8	13	37	46	−9	35	
13	Dukla Příbram	30	8	9	13	28	41	−13	33	
14	Opava	30	8	8	14	40	54	−14	32	
15	Viktoria Plzeň (R)	30	8	8	14	26	43	−17	32	Relegation to Czech 2. Liga
16	Karviná (R)	30	6	5	19	28	55	−27	23	Relegation to Czech 2. Liga

Source: Fortuna liga
Rules for classification: 1) points; 2) head-to-head points; 3) head-to-head goal difference; 4) head-to-head goals scored; 5) goal difference; 6) number of goals scored.
(C) Champions; (R) Relegated

== Results ==
Home \ Away	OST	BLŠ	BRN	DRN	PŘÍ	HRK	JAB	KAR	OPA	OLO	SLA	LIB	SPA	TEP	PLZ	VŽI
Baník Ostrava		2–2	1–0	2–1	1–2	0–0	4–1	0–0	1–1	1–1	5–0	2–0	2–0	0–0	0–1	2–1
Blšany	1–2		3–1	3–1	1–0	3–0	3–0	3–2	2–0	3–2	2–2	2–2	1–1	3–2	1–1	2–0
Boby Brno	3–0	1–0		3–2	1–1	0–1	3–0	4–2	4–1	0–0	1–0	0–2	0–1	0–3	3–0	1–0
Drnovice	0–0	2–0	0–0		1–2	0–2	1–1	1–1	3–2	0–0	1–1	1–1	4–4	0–2	1–0	4–2
Dukla Příbram	1–0	2–0	1–1	0–2		0–0	1–1	3–1	3–1	1–2	1–2	1–0	0–0	2–3	2–0	0–1
Hradec Králové	0–2	0–4	1–0	3–1	3–0		2–2	3–0	1–0	1–3	0–2	2–2	2–1	0–3	3–0	0–1
Jablonec	2–2	1–0	1–1	1–2	3–0	1–2		1–1	1–0	3–2	5–2	1–0	0–3	1–2	2–0	0–1
Karviná	1–3	2–0	1–3	0–2	2–0	1–1	1–0		2–1	1–2	1–2	2–0	0–3	0–2	2–0	1–1
Opava	0–0	1–1	2–1	4–0	2–2	3–1	2–1	2–1		2–2	0–4	2–0	2–1	3–3	1–1	2–0
Sigma Olomouc	3–2	2–1	1–1	0–1	0–0	1–0	3–1	2–0	3–1		1–1	3–0	1–1	2–0	1–1	2–1
Slavia Prague	0–0	5–2	1–1	4–0	2–0	1–0	1–1	1–0	3–0	4–0		1–0	1–0	2–1	1–1	4–1
Slovan Liberec	2–2	2–0	0–0	1–1	4–0	1–1	1–0	3–1	1–0	1–1	1–1		1–1	0–1	1–0	2–2
Sparta Prague	1–1	3–0	4–1	1–0	3–0	3–1	2–0	5–0	4–2	2–2	0–0	1–0		2–0	2–0	5–0
Teplice	0–0	1–3	2–1	2–2	1–1	4–0	1–2	3–0	4–0	1–0	3–1	4–0	1–1		4–2	2–0
Viktoria Plzeň	1–1	2–1	2–0	2–0	2–1	0–3	2–3	3–2	1–1	1–0	1–1	1–2	0–1	0–0		1–0
Viktoria Žižkov	1–1	2–1	0–2	0–1	1–1	1–0	1–1	1–0	3–2	2–0	2–1	0–3	1–6	2–0	3–0	

Source: Fortuna liga
Legend: Blue = home team win; Yellow = draw; Red = away team win.

== Top goalscorers ==
Rank	Player	Club	Goals
1	(Czech Republic) Horst Siegl	Sparta Prague	18
2	(Czech Republic) Pavel Verbíř	Teplice	13
3	(Czech Republic) Robert Vágner	Slavia Prague	12
4	(Czech Republic) František Koubek	Hradec Králové	11
4	(Czech Republic) Vratislav Lokvenc	Sparta Prague	11
4	(Czech Republic) Vítězslav Tuma	Drnovice	11
7	(Czech Republic) Luděk Zelenka	Viktoria Žižkov / Slavia Prague	10

== Attendances ==
Rank	Club	Average	Highest
1	Brno	13,207	24,400
2	Opava	11,359	15,000
3	Teplice	8,577	18,500
4	Baník Ostrava	6,821	10,328
5	Karviná	6,496	9,842
6	Sigma Olomouc	6,423	8,520
7	Příbram	6,294	10,924
8	Sparta Praha	4,939	13,065
9	Slavia Praha	4,668	10,106
10	Drnovice	4,427	9,139
11	Hradec Králové	4,132	9,103
12	Slovan Liberec	4,101	6,650
13	Viktoria Plzeň	4,033	7,702
14	Jablonec	3,946	7,120
15	Blšany	3,709	5,450
16	Viktoria Žižkov	3,544	6,523

== See also ==
- 1998–99 Czech Cup
- 1998–99 Czech 2. Liga
