= 1997–98 Czech First League =

5th season of top-tier football league in Czech Republic

Czech First League
- Season: 1997–98
- Champions: Sparta Prague
- Relegated: České Budějovice; Lázně Bohdaneč
- Champions League: Sparta Prague
- Cup Winners' Cup: Jablonec
- UEFA Cup: Slavia Prague; Sigma Olomouc
- Intertoto Cup: Boby Brno; Hradec Králové
- Matches: 240
- Goals: 585 (2.44 per match)
- Top goalscorer: Horst Siegl (13)
- Biggest home win: Jablonec 8–0 Č. Budějovice
- Biggest away win: Plzeň 1–5 Drnovice; Příbram 1–5 Ostrava
- Highest scoring: Jablonec 8–0 Č. Budějovice
- Highest attendance: 31,732; Brno 2–1 Sparta Prague
- Lowest attendance: 735; Lázně Bohdaneč 2–2 Plzeň
- Average attendance: 6,156

The 1997–98 Czech First League, known as the Gambrinus liga for sponsorship reasons, was the fifth season of top-tier football in the Czech Republic.

== League changes ==
Relegated to the 1997–98 Czech 2. Liga

- Bohemians Prague (16th)
- Karviná (15th)

Promoted from the 1996–97 Czech 2. Liga

- Dukla (1st)
- Lázně Bohdaneč (2nd)

== Stadia and locations ==
Location of clubs in the 1997–98 Czech First League

== League table ==
Pos	Team	Pld	W	D	L	GF	GA	GD	Pts	Qualification or relegation
1	Sparta Prague (C)	30	22	5	3	53	19	+34	71	Qualification for Champions League second qualifying round
2	Slavia Prague	30	17	8	5	42	22	+20	59	Qualification for UEFA Cup second qualifying round
3	Sigma Olomouc	30	16	7	7	38	21	+17	55	Qualification for UEFA Cup second qualifying round
4	Baník Ostrava	30	13	11	6	51	35	+16	50	
5	Slovan Liberec	30	13	8	9	39	32	+7	47	
6	Jablonec	30	12	10	8	47	33	+14	46	Qualification for Cup Winners' Cup first round
7	Teplice	30	10	10	10	36	30	+6	40	
8	Viktoria Žižkov	30	11	6	13	26	34	−8	39	
9	Drnovice	30	10	8	12	35	43	−8	38	
10	Boby Brno	30	10	7	13	42	42	0	37	Qualification for Intertoto Cup first round
11	Hradec Králové	30	8	10	12	25	36	−11	34	Qualification for Intertoto Cup first round
12	Kaučuk Opava	30	8	10	12	33	37	−4	34	
13	Dukla	30	9	6	15	37	50	−13	33	
14	Viktoria Plzeň	30	9	6	15	37	47	−10	33	
15	České Budějovice (R)	30	8	7	15	26	43	−17	31	Relegation to Czech 2. Liga
16	Lázně Bohdaneč (R)	30	2	5	23	18	61	−43	11	Relegation to Czech 2. Liga

Source: Fortuna liga
Rules for classification: 1) points; 2) head-to-head points; 3) head-to-head goal difference; 4) head-to-head goals scored; 5) goal difference; 6) number of goals scored.
(C) Champions; (R) Relegated

== Results ==
Home \ Away	OST	BRN	ČBU	DRN	PŘÍ	HRK	JAB	OPA	LBO	OLO	SLA	LIB	SPA	TEP	PLZ	VŽI
Baník Ostrava		3–3	0–0	2–0	1–0	3–0	2–2	1–0	6–1	1–0	1–1	1–2	2–1	1–0	3–2	6–1
Boby Brno	2–0		0–2	3–1	4–0	0–0	2–2	1–2	3–0	1–1	0–2	0–0	2–1	1–0	5–1	3–2
České Budějovice	0–1	1–3		2–0	0–0	1–0	0–1	0–0	3–0	0–0	2–1	1–1	0–1	2–0	1–1	1–2
Drnovice	2–2	4–0	3–0		4–1	1–0	0–2	1–1	3–1	0–2	0–0	1–0	2–2	0–0	2–0	2–1
Dukla	1–5	2–1	3–1	4–0		1–2	1–3	1–0	4–1	0–3	2–0	2–2	2–2	2–2	2–0	0–0
Hradec Králové	0–0	1–1	1–1	0–0	0–1		2–2	3–0	3–0	2–3	0–1	1–0	0–2	1–1	1–0	2–0
Jablonec	2–2	2–0	8–0	1–2	2–0	3–0		2–2	1–0	0–1	0–0	2–1	1–1	1–0	2–0	1–1
Kaučuk Opava	3–3	1–1	2–1	3–0	1–0	1–0	3–0		0–0	2–0	0–1	1–1	0–2	0–1	1–1	3–0
Lázně Bohdaneč	0–1	0–1	0–1	1–1	2–3	0–1	1–3	2–2		1–2	1–1	1–0	0–3	1–2	2–2	0–1
Sigma Olomouc	0–0	2–1	1–0	2–0	1–1	2–2	2–0	1–0	3–0		1–1	1–2	1–0	1–0	0–1	2–0
Slavia Prague	2–1	1–0	1–0	3–0	1–0	7–1	2–0	3–2	2–0	1–3		1–0	0–1	0–0	2–1	2–0
Slovan Liberec	3–1	1–0	2–0	3–1	2–1	0–0	3–1	3–0	2–0	1–0	1–1		0–1	0–0	3–2	3–0
Sparta Prague	4–1	2–0	3–1	4–0	2–0	1–0	2–1	1–0	1–0	1–0	1–1	4–2		3–1	2–1	2–0
Teplice	0–0	3–2	2–3	2–0	2–0	3–0	2–2	0–0	4–1	1–3	3–1	5–1	1–1		1–0	0–1
Viktoria Plzeň	3–1	3–2	4–1	1–5	4–3	0–0	0–0	3–2	0–0	2–0	1–2	0–0	0–1	2–0		1–0
Viktoria Žižkov	0–0	2–0	2–1	0–0	2–0	1–2	1–0	4–1	1–0	0–0	0–1	3–0	0–1	0–0	1–0	

Source: Fortuna liga
Legend: Blue = home team win; Yellow = draw; Red = away team win.

== Top goalscorers ==
Rank	Player	Club	Goals
1	(Czech Republic) Horst Siegl	Sparta Prague	13
2	(Czech Republic) Vratislav Lokvenc	Sparta Prague	12
3	(Czech Republic) Pavel Pěnička	Jablonec	11
3	(Czech Republic) Petr Samec	Baník Ostrava	11
5	(Czech Republic) Pavel Holomek	Boby Brno	10
5	(Czech Republic) Radek Drulák	Sigma Olomouc	10
7	(Slovakia) Martin Prohászka	Kaučuk Opava	9
7	(Czech Republic) Ladislav Fujdiar	České Budějovice	9
7	(Czech Republic) Rudolf Otepka	Dukla	9

== Attendances ==
#	Club	Average	Highest
1	Brno	15,365	31,730
2	Opava	11,860	14,938
3	Teplice	7,669	11,483
4	Příbram	7,231	11,871
5	Sparta Praha	6,532	15,628
6	Sigma Olomouc	5,850	13,137
7	Jablonec	5,359	10,365
8	Slavia Praha	5,194	9,339
9	Baník Ostrava	4,982	8,991
10	Slovan Liberec	4,884	6,637
11	Drnovice	4,874	9,558
12	České Budějovice	4,561	7,852
13	Hradec Králové	4,219	8,174
14	Viktoria Žižkov	4,121	7,386
15	Viktoria Plzeň	3,819	5,794
16	Lázně Bohdaneč	1,980	4,550

== See also ==
- 1997–98 Czech Cup
- 1997–98 Czech 2. Liga
