= Zdeněk Jánoš =

Czech footballer (1967–1999)

Personal information
- Date of birth: 11 May 1967
- Place of birth: Uherské Hradiště, Czechoslovakia
- Date of death: 15 September 1999 (aged 32)
- Place of death: Prague, Czech Republic
- Position: Goalkeeper

Youth career
- –1986: Slovácká Slavia Uh. Hradiště

Senior career*
Years	Team	Apps	(Gls)
1986–1987	Dukla Prague	0	(0)
1987–1988	VTJ Tábor	13	(0)
1988–1994	Slavia Prague	138	(1)
1994–1999	Jablonec	140	(2)
1999	Dukla Příbram	6	(0)
- * Club domestic league appearances and goals

Zdeněk Jánoš (11 May 1967 – 15 September 1999) was a Czech professional footballer who played as a goalkeeper. He is a member of the Czech League Goalkeepers Club for goalkeepers with 100 and more league clean sheets.

== Life and family ==
Jánoš was born on 11 May 1967 in Uherské Hradiště. He was married and had two sons, Dominik and Adam. Adam also became a professional footballer.

Jánoš had a passion for cars and fast driving. During his life he had several accidents in which he was unharmed. On 15 September 1999, he crashed into a bus in Prague without wearing a seat belt and died on the spot. He died at the age of 32.

== Career ==
Jánoš started to play football in Kněžpole near Uherské Hradiště. At the age of 16, he transferred to Slovácká Slavia Uherské Hradiště (then third-league club). During his compulsory military service, he was a member of the army clubs Dukla Prague and VTJ Tábor. He played for Slavia Prague from 1988 to 1994 and for Jablonec from 1994 to 1999. In total, he played twelve seasons in the Czechoslovak and Czech first leagues.

Jánoš kept 105 clean sheets in his first-league career and became a member of the Czech League Goalkeepers Club for goalkeepers with 100 and more league clean sheets. He kept most of them, 53, when playing for Jablonec.

Jánoš scored from three penalties in Czech First League matches (one for Slavia Prague and two for Jablonec) and as of 2025, he remains the best scoring goalkeeper of the league.

== Honours ==
Jablonec

- Czech Cup: 1997–98
