= Patrik Holomek =

Czech footballer

Personal information
- Date of birth: 6 September 1974 (age 52)
- Place of birth: Brno, Czechoslovakia
- Height: 1.88 m (6 ft 2 in)
- Position: Forward

Senior career*
Years	Team	Apps	(Gls)
1995	Zbrojovka Brno	1	(0)
1995-1996	→ SK Tatran Poštorná (loan)	29	(15)
1996	Zbrojovka Brno	14	(0)
1996-1997	→ SK České Budějovice (loan)	5	(0)
1997	→ SK Tatran Poštorná (loan)	25	(4)
1998	→ FC Zlín (loan)	13	(1)
1998-1999	→ FC Synot Staré Město (loan)	30	(18)
1999	Zbrojovka Brno	16	(2)
2000	→ FC Hradec Králové (loan)	6	(0)
2000-2002	→ FC Chomutov (loan)	54	(12)
2002-2003	→ SK Dolní Kounice (loan)	29	(4)
2003-2004	FK SK Bosonohy		
2004-2006	SV Leobendorf	60	(38)
2006-2008	SC Zwettl	56	(22)
2008-2009	SV Karlstetten	25	(19)
2009-2011	USV Rohrbach	59	(12)
2012	FK SK Bosonohy		
- * Club domestic league appearances and goals

Patrik Holomek (born 6 September 1974) is a Czech former football player. He was twice top goal scorer in the Czech 2. Liga, firstly for Poštorná and later for Staré Město. He scored over 50 goals in the Czech 2. Liga over his career.

== Honours ==
=== Individual ===
- Czech 2. Liga top goalscorer: 1995–96, 1998–99

== Personal life ==
Patrik Holomek's older brother, Pavel, also played professional football.
