= Edvard Lasota =

Czech footballer (born 1971)

Personal information
- Date of birth: 7 March 1971 (age 55)
- Place of birth: Třinec, Czechoslovakia
- Height: 1.76 m (5 ft 9 in)
- Position: Midfielder

Youth career
- 1979–1989: TJ TŽ Třinec

Senior career*
Years	Team	Apps	(Gls)
1989	Zbrojovka Brno	1	(0)
1989–1990	VTJ Tábor	?	(?)
1990–1991	Dukla Prague	20	(6)
1991–1993	FC Brno	36	(14)
1994	Sigma Olomouc	25	(2)
1995–1996	Petra Drnovice	43	(9)
1996–1998	Slavia Prague	45	(7)
1998–2001	AC Reggiana	20	(2)
2000	→ SFC Opava (loan)	13	(1)
2001	Salernitana	0	(0)
2001–2002	FK Drnovice	23	(5)
2002–2006	FC Tescoma Zlín	82	(13)
2006–2007	Fotbal Třinec	?	(?)
2007–2008	SK Bystřice nad Olší	?	(?)

International career^{‡}
1995–1998	Czech Republic	15	(2)
- * Club domestic league appearances and goals as of 23 November 2007 ‡ National team caps and goals as of 23 November 2007

Edvard Lasota (born 7 March 1971) is a Czech former football player who played mostly as a midfielder. Spending most of his career in the Czech leagues, he had short spells in Italy with AC Reggiana and Salernitana. He also played for the Czech Republic, earning 15 appearances and scoring two goals.

Lasota played in the Czechoslovak First League for Zbrojovka Brno and Dukla Prague. He went on to play for Sigma Olomouc, Petra Drnovice, and Slavia Prague – where he won the 1996–97 Czech Cup with the latter – before moving to Italy in 1998. Lasota played on loan at Opava for six months in the second half of the 1999–2000 Czech First League, in which the club was relegated. In July 2001, he signed a one-year contract with FK Drnovice of the First League.

== Career statistics ==
=== International goals ===
Scores and results list. Czech Republic's goal tally first.

#	Date	Venue	Opponent	Score	Result	Competition	Ref.
1.	21 December 1997	King Fahd International Stadium, Riyadh, Saudi Arabia	Uruguay	1–0	1–0	FIFA Confederations Cup	
2.	25 March 1998	Andruv Stadium, Olomouc, Czech Republic	Republic of Ireland	2–1	2–1	Friendly	

== Honours ==
- Slavia Prague: 1996–97 Czech Cup
- Czech Republic: 1997 FIFA Confederations Cup third place
