= Lázně Bohdaneč =

- Town
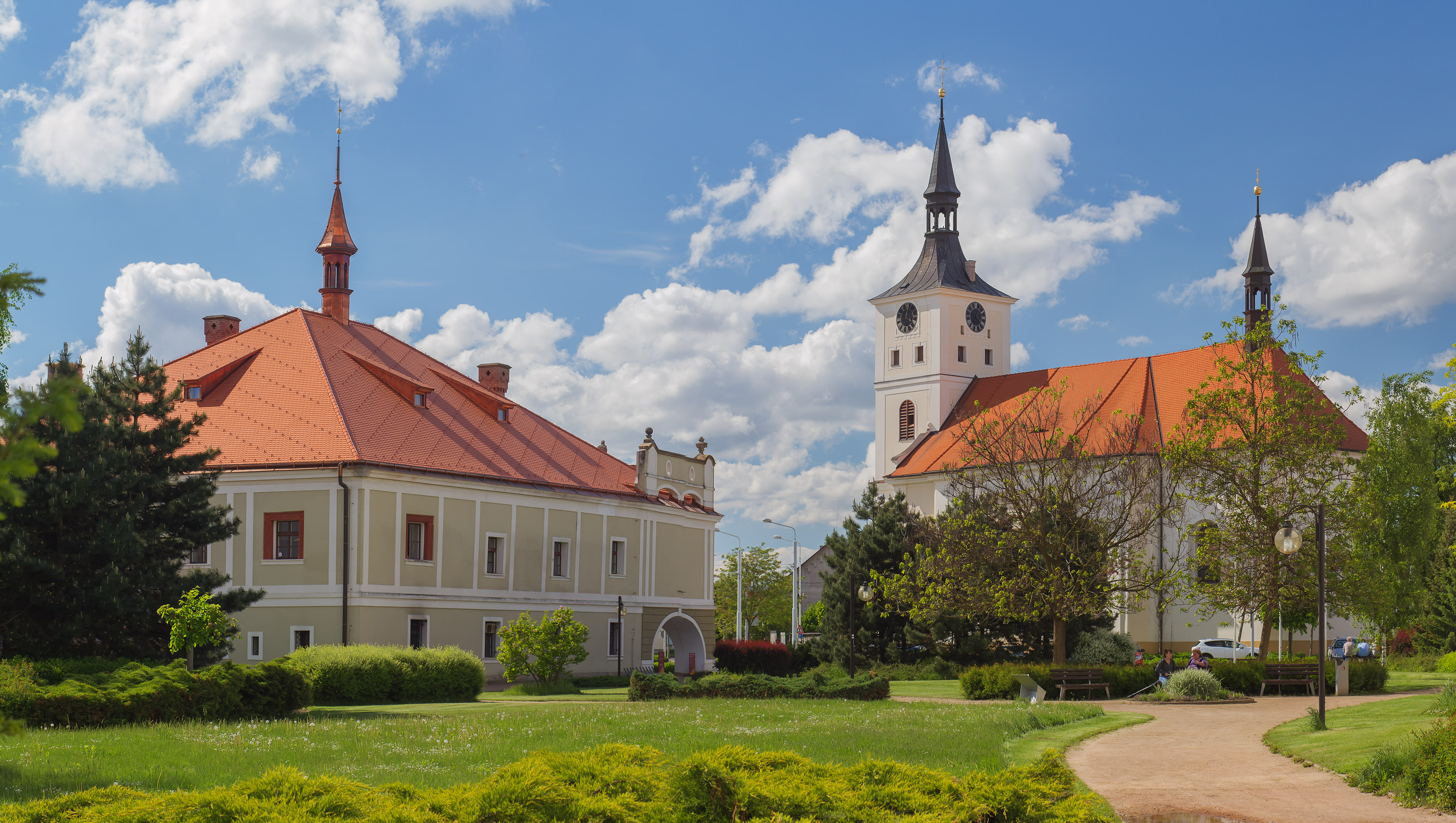
- Town hall and the Church of Saint Mary Magdalene

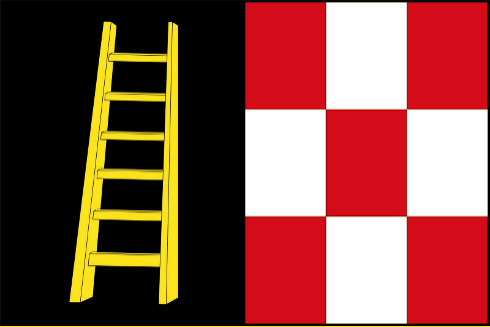
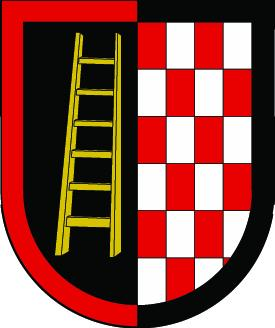
- Flag Coat of arms

- Location in the Czech Republic
- Coordinates: 50°4′32″N 15°40′47″E
- Country: Czech Republic
- Region: Pardubice
- District: Pardubice
- First mentioned: 1343

Government
  - Mayor: Josef Štěpanovský

Area
  - Total: 21.79 km^{2} (8.41 sq mi)
- Elevation: 218 m (715 ft)

Population (2026-01-01)
  - Total: 3,323
  - Density: 152.5/km^{2} (395.0/sq mi)
- Time zone: UTC+1 (CET)
  - Summer (DST): UTC+2 (CEST)
- Postal code: 533 41
- Website: lazne.bohdanec.cz

Lázně Bohdaneč (Czech pronunciation: [ˈlaːzɲɛ ˈboɦdanɛtʃ]; until 1980 Bohdaneč) is a spa town in Pardubice District in the Pardubice Region of the Czech Republic. It has about 3,300 inhabitants.

== Etymology ==
The name Bohdaneč is derived from the personal name Bohdanec (diminutive form of Bohdan), meaning "Bohdanec's". In the Middle Ages, the name Bohdanice was also used. In 1980, the name was changed to Lázně Bohdaneč ('spa Bohdaneč').

== Geography ==
Lázně Bohdaneč is located about 7 kilometres (4 mi) northwest of Pardubice. It lies in the East Elbe Table, in the Polabí region. The streams Černská strouha and Rajská strouha flow through the municipal territory.

Several fishponds are located in the northern part of the territory. The largest of them is Bohdanečský rybník, which is together with its surroundings protected as the Bohdanečský rybník National Nature Reserve.

== History ==
The first written mention of Bohdaneč is from 1264. In 1491, it was acquired by the Pernštejn family. During their rule, the greatest development occurred. The Pernštejns built the Opatovice Canal through the area to supply the large pond system and completely changed the character of the landscape. They also laid out today's floor plan of the town and founded four main streets. On the town square, Renaissance burgher houses and the new town hall were built. Most of these houses were destroyed by a large fire in 1772. The fire and subsequent cholera epidemics stopped the development of the town.

Bohdaneč remained a small agricultural town until 1897, when the peat spa was founded.

== Demographics ==
Historical population

Year	Pop.	±%
1869	1,589	—
1880	1,846	+16.2%
1890	1,741	−5.7%
1900	1,677	−3.7%
1910	1,646	−1.8%

Year	Pop.	±%
1921	1,550	−5.8%
1930	1,886	+21.7%
1950	1,972	+4.6%
1961	1,932	−2.0%
1970	2,140	+10.8%

Year	Pop.	±%
1980	2,270	+6.1%
1991	2,279	+0.4%
2001	3,096	+35.8%
2011	3,349	+8.2%
2021	3,407	+1.7%

Source: Censuses

== Economy ==
The spa is the main employer based in the town. It is focused on the treatment of musculoskeletal disorders.

== Transport ==
There are no railways or major roads passing through the municipality.

== Sport ==
The town was home of a football club AFK Atlantic Lázně Bohdaneč, which played the Czech First League in the 1997–98 season. After this season the club was relegated and due to financial problems it was merged with FK Slovan Pardubice in 2000. Today the town is home to the club SK Lázně Bohdaneč, which plays in lower amateur tiers.

== Sights ==
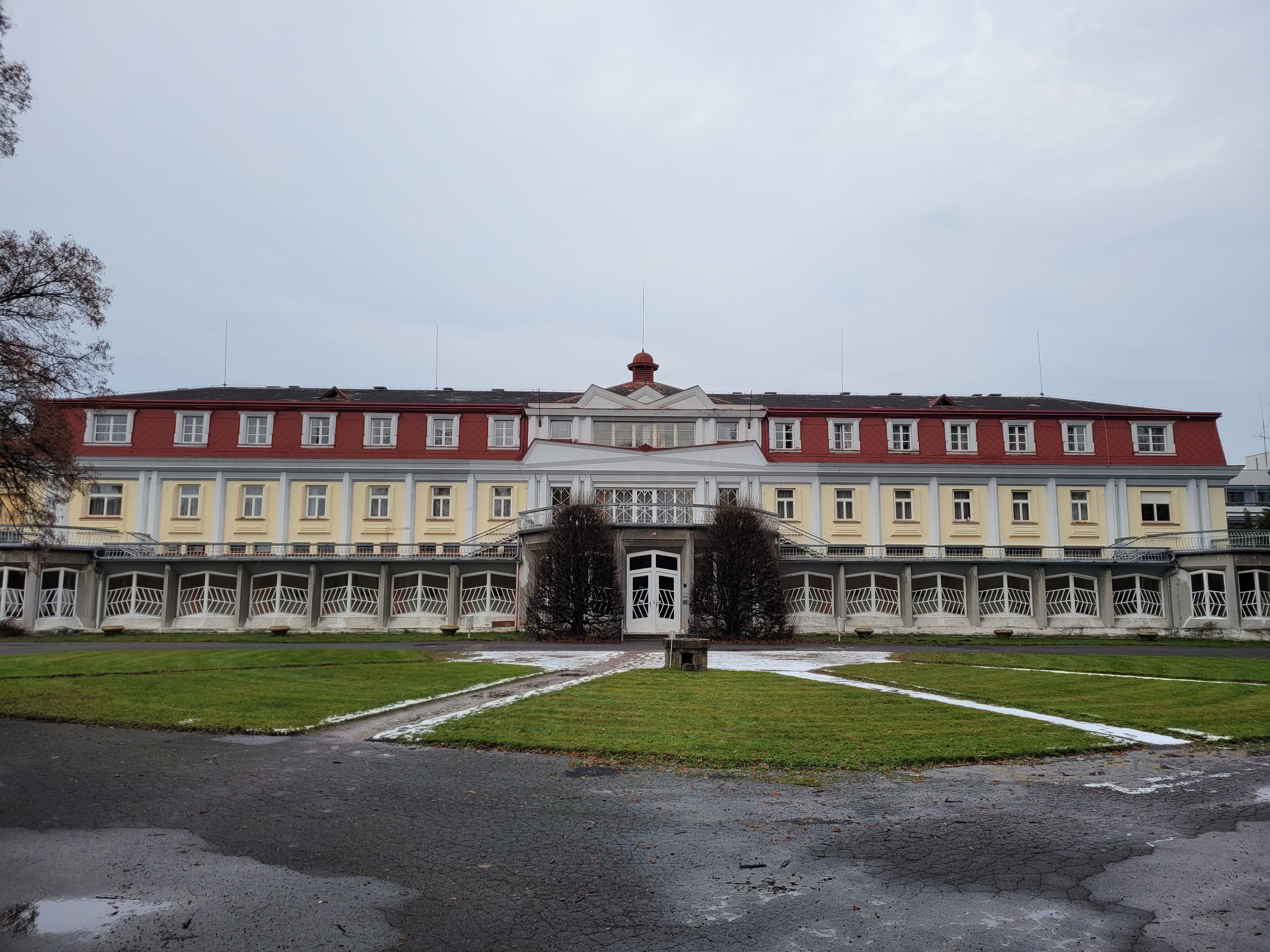
Gočár Pavilion

The main landmark of the town square is the Church of the Mary Magdalene. It was built in the Baroque style in 1728–1737.

Gočár Pavilion is a Cubist building that is part of the spa. It was built according to the design of the leading Czech architect Josef Gočár in 1911.
