= Jiří Ješeta =

Czech footballer

Personal information
- Date of birth: 30 January 1970 (age 56)
- Position: Midfielder

Senior career*
Years	Team	Apps	(Gls)
- Vagonka Česká Lípa
- Union Cheb
1994–1996	Slovan Liberec		
1996–1998	Atlantic Lázně Bohdaneč		
1998–1999	MUS Most 1996		
- VfB Zittau
- * Club domestic league appearances and goals

Jiří Ješeta (born 30 January 1970) is a retired Czech football midfielder.
