= 1998–99 Czech 2. Liga =

2. česká fotbalová liga
- Season: 1998–1999
- Champions: Bohemians Prague
- Promoted: Bohemians Prague; České Budějovice
- Relegated: Přerov; Česká Lípa
- Matches played: 240
- Goals scored: 574 (2.39 per match)
- Top goalscorer: Patrik Holomek (18)
- Average attendance: 1,471

The 1998–99 Czech 2. Liga was the sixth season of the 2. česká fotbalová liga, the second tier of the Czech football league.

== League standings ==
Pos	Team	Pld	W	D	L	GF	GA	GD	Pts	Promotion or relegation
1	Bohemians Prague (C, P)	30	23	4	3	62	12	+50	73	Promotion to 1999–2000 1. Liga
2	České Budějovice (P)	30	22	6	2	65	18	+47	72	Promotion to 1999–2000 1. Liga
3	Synot	30	20	7	3	64	26	+38	67	
4	Most	30	16	8	6	47	31	+16	56	
5	Vítkovice	30	13	7	10	40	37	+3	46	
6	NH Ostrava	30	10	10	10	28	28	0	40	
7	Lázně Bohdaneč	30	9	10	11	25	32	−7	37	
8	Zlín	30	10	6	14	26	33	−7	36	
9	Frýdek-Místek	30	9	7	14	33	40	−7	34	
10	Mladá Boleslav	30	9	7	14	23	30	−7	34	
11	Poštorná	30	9	7	14	31	41	−10	34	
12	Chrudim (R)	30	10	4	16	30	48	−18	34	Relegation to 1999–2000 ČFL
13	Třinec	30	8	6	16	32	52	−20	30	
14	Prostějov	30	8	5	17	24	39	−15	29	
15	Přerov (R)	30	7	5	18	27	56	−29	26	Relegation to 1999–2000 MSFL (Note: Přerov subsequently withdrew and did not compete in the following season's MSFL.)
16	Česká Lípa (R)	30	4	7	19	17	51	−34	19	Relegation to 1999–2000 ČFL

Source: RSSSF
Rules for classification: 1) points; 2) goal difference; 3) number of goals scored.
(C) Champions; (P) Promoted; (R) Relegated

== Top goalscorers ==
Rank	Scorer	Club	Goals
1	(Czech Republic) Patrik Holomek	Synot	18
2	(Czech Republic) Ladislav Fujdiar	České Budějovice	16
2	(Czech Republic) Jiří Povišer	České Budějovice	16
4	(Czech Republic) Tomáš Janda	České Budějovice	12
5	(Czech Republic) Lubomír Langer	Vítkovice	11
5	(Czech Republic) Luděk Zdráhal	Bohemians Prague	11

== See also ==
- 1998–99 Czech First League
- 1998–99 Czech Cup
