= 1995–96 Czech First League =

3rd season of top-tier football league in Czech Republic

Czech First League
- Season: 1995–96
- Champions: Slavia Prague
- Relegated: Union Cheb; Svit Zlín; Uherské Hradiště
- Champions League: Slavia Prague
- Cup Winners' Cup: Sparta Prague
- UEFA Cup: Sigma Olomouc
- Intertoto Cup: Kaučuk Opava
- Matches: 240
- Goals: 634 (2.64 per match)
- Top goalscorer: Radek Drulák (22)
- Biggest home win: Slavia Prague 9–1 U. Hradiště
- Biggest away win: U. Hradiště 0–4 Jablonec; U. Hradiště 0–4 Č. Budějovice
- Highest scoring: Slavia Prague 9–1 U. Hradiště
- Highest attendance: 26,870; Brno 2–2 Drnovice
- Lowest attendance: 192; Cheb 2–0 Jablonec
- Average attendance: 5,129

The 1995–96 Czech First League was the third season of top-tier football in the Czech Republic.

== League changes ==
Relegated to the 1995–96 Czech 2. Liga

- Bohemians Prague
- Benešov

Promoted from the 1994–95 Czech 2. Liga

- Opava
- Uherské Hradiště

== Stadia and locations ==
Location of clubs in the 1995–96 Czech First League

== League table ==
| Pos | Team | Pld | W | D | L | GF | GA | GD | Pts | Qualification or relegation |
|---|---|---|---|---|---|---|---|---|---|---|
| 1 | Slavia Prague (C) | 30 | 23 | 1 | 6 | 68 | 28 | +40 | 70 | Qualification for Champions League qualifying round |
| 2 | Sigma Olomouc | 30 | 19 | 4 | 7 | 54 | 33 | +21 | 61 | Qualification for UEFA Cup qualifying round |
| 3 | Jablonec | 30 | 16 | 5 | 9 | 45 | 26 | +19 | 53 | |
| 4 | Sparta Prague | 30 | 14 | 7 | 9 | 56 | 35 | +21 | 49 | Qualification for Cup Winners' Cup qualifying round |
| 5 | Drnovice | 30 | 14 | 6 | 10 | 53 | 40 | +13 | 48 | |
| 6 | Kaučuk Opava | 30 | 13 | 7 | 10 | 40 | 34 | +6 | 46 | Qualification for Intertoto Cup group stage |
| 7 | Slovan Liberec | 30 | 12 | 8 | 10 | 34 | 30 | +4 | 44 | |
| 8 | Boby Brno | 30 | 12 | 7 | 11 | 39 | 42 | −3 | 43 | |
| 9 | Viktoria Plzeň | 30 | 11 | 6 | 13 | 33 | 34 | −1 | 39 | |
| 10 | Viktoria Žižkov | 30 | 9 | 10 | 11 | 38 | 43 | −5 | 37 | |
| 11 | České Budějovice | 30 | 10 | 7 | 13 | 35 | 47 | −12 | 37 | |
| 12 | Baník Ostrava | 30 | 10 | 5 | 15 | 40 | 46 | −6 | 35 | |
| 13 | Union Cheb (R) | 30 | 8 | 9 | 13 | 35 | 47 | −12 | 33 | Relegation to Czech 2. Liga (Note: Union Cheb was in a financial crisis and resigned from playing in the next season.) |
| 14 | Hradec Králové | 30 | 8 | 5 | 17 | 28 | 46 | −18 | 29 | |
| 15 | Svit Zlín (R) | 30 | 6 | 9 | 15 | 17 | 38 | −21 | 27 | Relegation to Czech 2. Liga |
| 16 | Uherské Hradiště (R) | 30 | 3 | 8 | 19 | 19 | 65 | −46 | 17 | Relegation to Czech 2. Liga |

Source: Fortuna liga
Rules for classification: 1) points; 2) head-to-head points; 3) head-to-head goal difference; 4) head-to-head goals scored; 5) goal difference; 6) number of goals scored.
(C) Champions; (R) Relegated

== Results ==
| Home \ Away | OST | BRN | ČBU | DRN | HRK | JAB | OPA | OLO | SLA | LIB | SPA | ZLÍ | UHH | CHE | PLZ | VŽI |
|---|---|---|---|---|---|---|---|---|---|---|---|---|---|---|---|---|
| Baník Ostrava | | 0–2 | 3–1 | 5–3 | 2–0 | 1–1 | 1–2 | 3–1 | 1–2 | 1–0 | 4–1 | 3–1 | 2–1 | 3–0 | 3–2 | 0–1 |
| Boby Brno | 3–2 | | 5–2 | 2–2 | 2–0 | 1–0 | 1–1 | 2–3 | 0–2 | 1–1 | 1–0 | 1–1 | 2–0 | 2–0 | 0–3 | 3–1 |
| České Budějovice | 1–0 | 0–0 | | 2–1 | 0–3 | 3–0 | 1–1 | 2–1 | 2–3 | 0–0 | 2–0 | 2–0 | 2–0 | 3–3 | 2–2 | 1–1 |
| Drnovice | 3–1 | 2–3 | 2–0 | | 3–0 | 2–0 | 3–1 | 1–2 | 3–0 | 0–0 | 4–4 | 3–0 | 2–2 | 3–0 | 4–1 | 2–2 |
| Hradec Králové | 2–1 | 1–0 | 1–2 | 1–0 | | 2–2 | 0–1 | 1–3 | 0–3 | 0–0 | 0–2 | 0–2 | 2–0 | 0–1 | 0–0 | 2–0 |
| Jablonec | 3–0 | 3–0 | 2–1 | 0–1 | 4–2 | | 2–1 | 4–2 | 2–1 | 1–0 | 1–0 | 1–0 | 4–0 | 0–0 | 1–0 | 5–0 |
| Kaučuk Opava | 3–0 | 0–2 | 3–1 | 1–2 | 2–1 | 0–1 | | 1–1 | 1–1 | 0–0 | 2–0 | 3–2 | 2–0 | 4–1 | 2–0 | 1–0 |
| Sigma Olomouc | 1–0 | 2–0 | 4–0 | 2–0 | 1–0 | 2–1 | 3–2 | | 2–1 | 3–0 | 3–1 | 3–0 | 2–0 | 3–1 | 3–0 | 1–1 |
| Slavia Prague | 2–0 | 2–1 | 3–0 | 1–2 | 2–1 | 2–1 | 3–0 (Note: Match awarded, as Kaučuk Opava did not start in time.) | 4–0 | | 2–1 | 0–2 | 2–0 | 9–1 | 2–0 | 2–1 | 5–0 |
| Slovan Liberec | 3–0 | 1–0 | 2–1 | 4–0 | 3–2 | 1–0 | 1–0 | 2–0 | 2–3 | | 1–0 | 1–2 | 4–0 | 2–3 | 1–0 | 0–0 |
| Sparta Prague | 1–1 | 4–0 | 3–0 | 2–1 | 5–0 | 1–1 | 1–1 | 0–2 | 3–1 | 3–1 | | 3–0 | 4–0 | 3–0 | 1–0 | 1–0 |
| Svit Zlín | 0–0 | 0–0 | 1–0 | 1–0 | 1–1 | 0–0 | 0–1 | 0–0 | 0–1 | 0–1 | 1–1 | | 2–0 | 0–2 | 1–0 | 0–1 |
| Uherské Hradiště | 1–2 | 1–3 | 0–4 | 0–1 | 1–0 | 0–4 | 0–1 | 2–1 | 0–2 | 1–1 | 2–2 | 1–1 | | 0–0 | 2–2 | 1–0 |
| Union Cheb | 1–1 | 3–1 | 0–0 | 1–2 | 0–2 | 2–0 | 3–1 | 1–1 | 1–3 | 4–0 | 3–3 | 1–1 | 1–0 | | 1–2 | 2–2 |
| Viktoria Plzeň | 1–0 | 1–1 | 2–0 | 1–1 | 1–2 | 0–1 | 2–1 | 2–0 | 0–1 | 2–0 | 2–1 | 3–0 | 1–1 | 1–0 | | 1–0 |
| Viktoria Žižkov | 2–1 | 4–0 | 4–0 | 1–0 | 2–2 | 1–0 | 1–1 | 1–2 | 1–3 | 1–1 | 1–4 | 3–0 | 2–2 | 2–0 | 2–0 | |

Source: Fortuna liga
Legend: Blue = home team win; Yellow = draw; Red = away team win.

== Top goalscorers ==
| Rank | Player | Club | Goals |
|---|---|---|---|
| 1 | (Czech Republic) Radek Drulák | Petra Drnovice | 22 |
| 2 | (Czech Republic) Pavel Nedvěd | Sparta Prague | 14 |
| 3 | (Czech Republic) Miroslav Baranek | Sigma Olomouc | 13 |
| 4 | (Czech Republic) Karel Poborský | Slavia Prague | 11 |
| 4 | (Czech Republic) Robert Vágner | Slavia Prague | 11 |
| 4 | (Czech Republic) Jiří Bartl | Kaučuk Opava | 11 |
| 4 | (Czech Republic) René Wagner | Boby Brno | 11 |
| 4 | (Czech Republic) Jan Seidl | České Budějovice | 11 |
| 4 | (Czech Republic) Karel Vácha | České Budějovice | 11 |

== Attendances ==
| # | Club | Average | Highest |
|---|---|---|---|
| 1 | Brno | 12,283 | 26,872 |
| 2 | Opava | 10,148 | 12,500 |
| 3 | Slavia Praha | 6,060 | 10,036 |
| 4 | Uherské Hradiště | 5,851 | 11,000 |
| 5 | Drnovice | 5,538 | 7,523 |
| 6 | Jablonec | 5,368 | 8,650 |
| 7 | Sigma Olomouc | 5,202 | 7,516 |
| 8 | Sparta Praha | 5,164 | 15,437 |
| 9 | Slovan | 4,937 | 7,052 |
| 10 | Hradec Králové | 4,415 | 11,893 |
| 11 | Zlín | 3,775 | 6,790 |
| 12 | Viktoria Plzeň | 3,441 | 6,849 |
| 13 | České Budějovice | 2,902 | 6,052 |
| 14 | Viktoria Žižkov | 2,865 | 8,051 |
| 15 | Ostrava | 2,180 | 8,615 |
| 16 | Cheb | 1,948 | 6,001 |

== See also ==
- 1995–96 Czech Cup
- 1995–96 Czech 2. Liga
