= 1997–98 Czech 2. Liga =

2. česká fotbalová liga
- Season: 1997–1998
- Champions: Blšany
- Promoted: Blšany; Karviná
- Relegated: U. Hradiště; Ústí nad Labem
- Matches played: 210
- Goals scored: 535 (2.55 per match)
- Top goalscorer: Vítězslav Tuma (19)
- Average attendance: 1,757

The 1997–98 Czech 2. Liga was the fifth season of the 2. česká fotbalová liga, the second tier of the Czech football league. Ústí nad Labem did not fulfil their fixtures and their results were cancelled.

== League standings ==
Pos	Team	Pld	W	D	L	GF	GA	GD	Pts	Promotion or relegation
1	Blšany (C, P)	28	21	3	4	64	17	+47	66	Promotion to 1998–99 1. Liga
2	Karviná (P)	28	18	3	7	49	17	+32	57	Promotion to 1998–99 1. Liga
3	Bohemians Prague	28	15	8	5	49	22	+27	53	
4	Staré Mesto	28	14	4	10	42	34	+8	46	
5	Zlín	28	10	13	5	42	27	+15	43	
6	Most	28	12	7	9	36	30	+6	43	
7	Poštorná	28	12	5	11	34	36	−2	41	
8	Vítkovice	28	10	7	11	31	31	0	37	
9	Frýdek-Místek	28	8	10	10	37	39	−2	34	
10	Prostějov	28	8	9	11	33	37	−4	33	
11	Přerov	28	9	6	13	29	41	−12	33	
12	Chrudim	28	8	7	13	29	46	−17	31	
13	Česká Lípa	28	8	5	15	28	44	−16	29	
14	Třinec	28	8	4	16	21	41	−20	28	
15	Uherské Hradiště (R)	28	2	3	23	11	73	−62	9	Relegation to 1998-99 MSFL
16	Ústí nad Labem (R)	0	0	0	0	0	0	0	0	Results cancelled

Source: RSSSF
Rules for classification: 1) points; 2) goal difference; 3) number of goals scored.
(C) Champions; (P) Promoted; (R) Relegated

== Top goalscorers ==
Rank	Scorer	Club	Goals
1	(Czech Republic) Vítězslav Tuma	Karviná	19
2	(Czech Republic) Marek Nikl	Bohemians Prague	13
3	(Czech Republic) Jiří Novák	Bohemians Prague	11
3	(Czech Republic) Petr Vrabec	Blšany	11

== See also ==
- 1997–98 Czech First League
- 1997–98 Czech Cup
