= Radek Tejml =

Czech footballer

Personal information
- Date of birth: 30 September 1967 (age 59)
- Place of birth: České Budějovice, Czechoslovakia
- Position: Defender

Senior career*
Years	Team	Apps	(Gls)
1991–1998	České Budějovice		
1997	→ Slovan Liberec (loan)		
1997–1998	→ Lázně Bohdaneč (loan)		
2001–2002	SC Gmünd		
- * Club domestic league appearances and goals

Radek Tejml (born 30 September 1967) is a retired Czech football defender.
