= Josef Němec (footballer) =

Czech footballer and manager

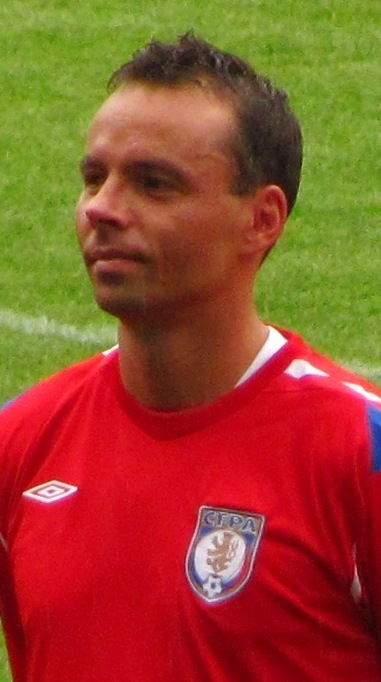

Personal information
- Date of birth: 24 July 1972 (age 54)
- Place of birth: Czechoslovakia
- Height: 1.74 m (5 ft 9 in)
- Position: Midfielder

Team information
- Current team: FK Chmel Blšany

Senior career*
Years	Team	Apps	(Gls)
1993–1994	Dukla Prague	27	(7)
1994–1996	AC Sparta Prague	43	(4)
1996–1998	FK Viktoria Žižkov	50	(5)
1998–2001	Cruz Azul		
2001	FK Drnovice	15	(0)
2002	FC Marila Příbram	11	(0)
2002–2003	FK Chmel Blšany	29	(2)
2003–2004	FC Viktoria Plzeň	16	(0)
2004–2005	SK Dynamo České Budějovice	12	(0)

Managerial career
- 2009–: FK Chmel Blšany
Medal record
AC Sparta Prague
Winner	Gambrinus liga	1994–95
- * Club domestic league appearances and goals

Josef Němec (born 24 July 1972) is a Czech football manager and former player. He played at a number of clubs in the Gambrinus liga, making over 200 appearances. He also played top-flight football in Mexico. He is currently the manager of FK Chmel Blšany, where he has operated since 2009.
