= Tomáš Janda =

Czech footballer (born 1973)

Personal information
- Date of birth: 27 June 1973 (age 51)
- Place of birth: Czechoslovakia
- Height: 1.86 m (6 ft 1 in)
- Position(s): Forward

Senior career*
Years	Team	Apps	(Gls)
1993–1994	Dukla Prague	8	(0)
1995–1996	FC Svit Zlín	14	(3)
1996–1997	FC Petra Drnovice	6	(0)
1996–1998	FK Teplice	33	(3)
1999–2000	SK Dynamo České Budějovice	29	(11)
2001	→ Anyang LG Cheetahs (loan)	0	(0)
2001	SK Dynamo České Budějovice	15	(6)
2001–2002	FK Chmel Blšany	6	(1)
2002–2003	FC Tescoma Zlín	15	(2)
- *Club domestic league appearances and goals

Tomáš Janda (born 27 June 1973) is a retired Czech football forward. He played for numerous clubs in the Gambrinus liga between 1993 and 2003. He also played for FC Seoul of the South Korean K League, then known as Anyang LG Cheetahs.
