= Aleš Kohout =

Czech footballer

Personal information
- Date of birth: 3 January 1972 (age 54)
- Place of birth: Czechoslovakia
- Height: 1.81 m (5 ft 11 in)
- Position: Forward

Senior career*
Years	Team	Apps	(Gls)
1998	FK Jablonec	15	(2)
1999	FK Mladá Boleslav	12	(4)
1999–2005	Wuppertaler SV	169	(62)
2005–2007	SSVg Velbert	51	(16)
2007–2008	KFC Uerdingen 05	24	(2)
Total		271	(86)
- * Club domestic league appearances and goals

Aleš Kohout (born 3 January 1972) is a Czech former footballer who played as a forward.

== Career ==
He played in the Gambrinus liga for FK Jablonec, scoring twice in 15 appearances. He scored the decisive goal in the final of the 1997–98 Czech Cup as Jablonec beat Drnovice. Kohout played in the second division for Mladá Boleslav in the 1998–99 season. He subsequently played in the lower divisions in Germany.
