= Jan Pejša =

Czech footballer (born 1970)

Personal information
- Date of birth: 27 May 1970 (age 54)
- Place of birth: Kladno, Czechoslovakia
- Position(s): Defender

Senior career*
| Years | Team | Apps | (Gls) |
| 1993–1995 | Kladno | | (9) |
| 1995 | Teplice | 15 | (1) |
| 1996–1999 | Opava | 88 | (6) |
| 1999–2001 | České Budějovice | 55 | (2) |
| 2001–2003 | Ethnikos Achna | | |
- *Club domestic league appearances and goals

Jan Pejša (born 27 May 1970) is a Czech former footballer who played as a defender.

== Personal life ==
Pejša was born in 1970 in Kladno, Czechoslovakia. He has a daughter and a son.

== Playing career ==
Pejša started his career with SK Kladno. In 1995, he signed for FK Teplice. In 1996, he signed for SFC Opava. In 1999, he signed for SK Dynamo České Budějovice. In 2001, he signed for Cypriot side Ethnikos Achna FC. In 2003, he returned to the Czech Republic and played in the lower amateur tiers for SK Tatran Poštorná, SFC Opava (which then fell into the 5th tier), FK Baník Albrechtice and SFC Opava B.

== Managerial career ==
Pejša has been holder of the highest professional coaching license. He was assistant coach in SFC Opava and MFK Karviná and coach in various teams in amateur tiers of the Czech football. In 2017–18, he managed SK Kladno and led the club to a ninth-place in the Czech Fourth Division.
