= Pavel Vrba =

Czech soccer coach

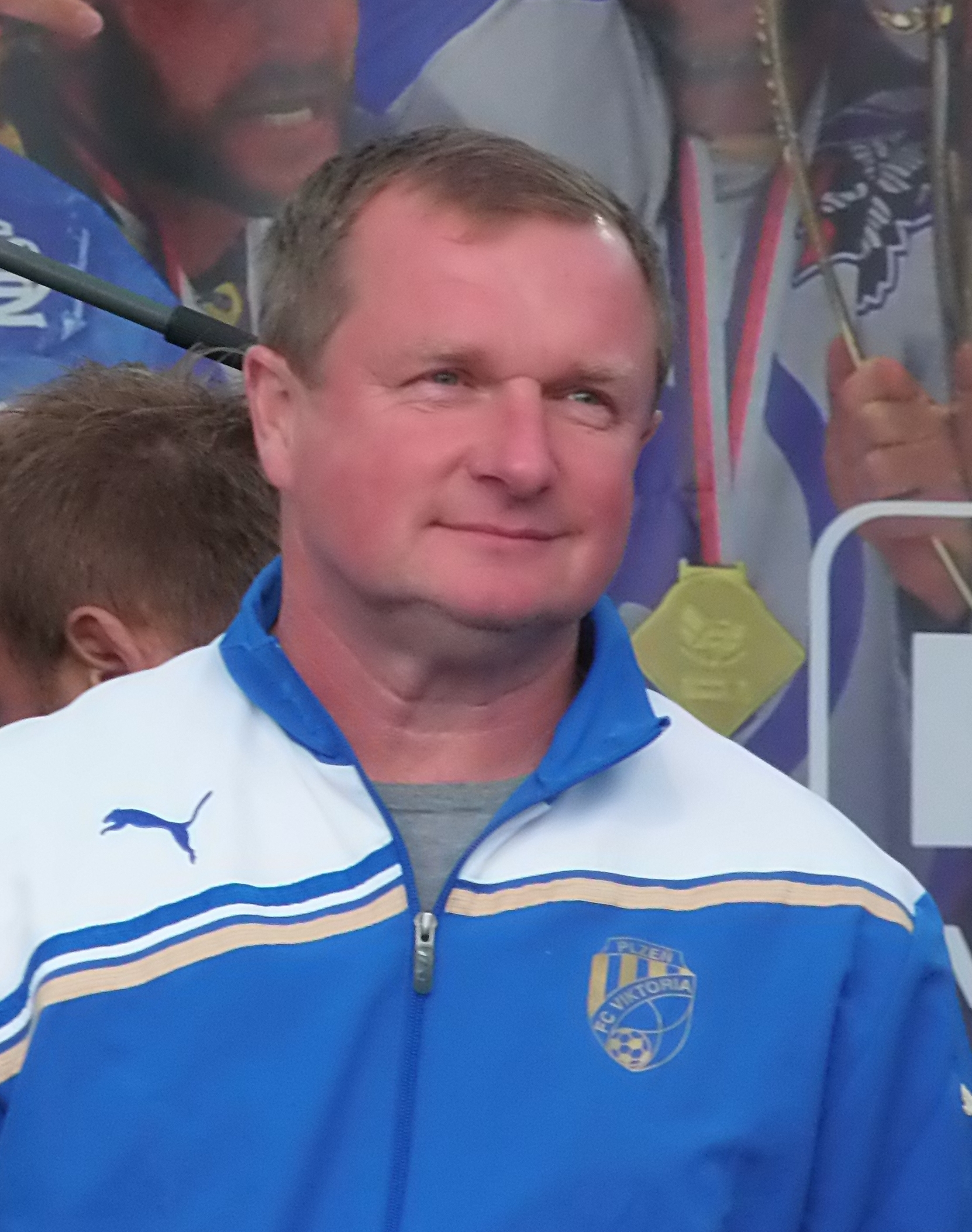
- Vrba in 2013

Personal information
- Full name: Pavel Vrba
- Date of birth: 6 December 1963 (age 62)
- Place of birth: Přerov, Czechoslovakia
- Position: Midfielder

Youth career
- 1973–1979: FK Přerov
- 1979–1981: Baník Ostrava

Senior career*
Years	Team	Apps	(Gls)
1981–1982	Železárny Prostějov		
1982–1984	RH Cheb		
- → TJ RH Sušice (loan)
- → TJ Nýrsko (loan)
1984–1985	Baník Ostrava		
1985–1993	Baník Havířov		
1993–1994	FK Přerov		

Managerial career
- 1994–1996: FK Přerov
- 1996–2004: Baník Ostrava (Assistant)
- 2003: Baník Ostrava
- 2004–2006: Púchov
- 2006–2008: Žilina
- 2006–2008: Slovakia (Assistant)
- 2008–2013: Viktoria Plzeň
- 2014–2016: Czech Republic
- 2016: Anzhi Makhachkala
- 2017–2019: Viktoria Plzeň
- 2019–2020: Ludogorets Razgrad
- 2021–2022: Sparta Prague
- 2022: Baník Ostrava
- 2022–2023: Zlín
- 2024–2025: Líšeň
- * Club domestic league appearances and goals

Pavel Vrba (born 6 December 1963) is a Czech football manager and former player. He is known for applying an offensive football philosophy in the teams he coaches.

As a player, Vrba played for several clubs, including Baník Ostrava. As a coach, he led several Czech and Slovak clubs, including a Czech First League record of five seasons in charge of FC Viktoria Plzeň, whom he led to two league titles, one cup title, and three consecutive seasons of participation in the UEFA Europa League knockout stage – a record for any Czech club.

== Managerial career ==
=== Early career ===
Having been assistant to manager Erich Cviertna, Vrba took charge of FC Baník Ostrava for a short time towards the end of the 2002–03 Czech First League after Cviertna's departure. His first match in charge resulted in a 7–0 loss for Ostrava away to Slavia Prague.

He won the Slovak Superleague with MŠK Žilina in the 2006–07 season and led the team to second place the following season.

=== Viktoria Plzeň ===
In 2010, he led Viktoria Plzeň to the victory in the Czech Cup for the first time in the club history. He was voted the Czech Coach of the Year for 2010. In the 2010–11 season of the Czech First League, he won the league with Viktoria Plzeň for the first time in the club history. Vrba was awarded the title "Czech Coach of the Year" for 2012, symbolising the third consecutive year he had won the award. He led Plzeň to a second league title in 2013. In October 2013 Vrba led Plzen for a 152nd consecutive top-flight match, setting a league record. Despite having a contract with Plzeň until June 2015, the Czech Football Association activated a buy-out clause, paying his club 8 million Czech koruna and he was announced as the new manager of the Czech Republic national football team in November 2013. His last game in charge of the club was the 2013–14 UEFA Champions League group stage tie against CSKA Moscow which Plzeň won 2–1 with a last-minute goal from Tomáš Wágner, thus earning them a place in the Europa League knockout stage. At the end of the match, the fans unfurled a banner reading "always remember that it wasn't wasted time".

=== Ludogorets Razgrad ===
On 16 December 2019, Vrba became manager of Bulgarian Ludogorets Razgrad.

=== Sparta Prague ===
On 3 February 2021, Vrba became manager of Sparta Prague.

=== Trinity Zlín ===
On 28 November 2022, Vrba became manager of Trinity Zlín.

=== Líšeň ===
On 18 December 2024, Vrba became manager of Líšeň. On 4 February 2025, Vrba was dismissed after only managing the club in five pre-season matches.

== Honours ==
=== Managerial ===
Žilina

- Slovak Super Liga: 2006–07
- Slovak Super Cup: 2007

Viktoria Plzeň

- Czech First League: 2010–11, 2012–13, 2017–18
- Czech Cup: 2009–10
- Czech Supercup: 2011

Ludogorets Razgrad

- First Professional Football League (Bulgaria): 2019–20

=== Individual ===
- Czech Coach of the Year (8): 2010, 2011, 2012, 2013, 2014, 2015, 2017, 2018

== Managerial statistics ==
As of match played 4 February 2025

Team	From	To	Record							
Team	From	To	G	W	D	L	GF	GA	GD	Win %
Baník Ostrava	3 May 2003	17 June 2003	5	2	2	1	7	10	−3	40.00
Matador Púchov	18 June 2004	7 April 2006	65	18	14	33	54	91	−37	27.69
Žilina	1 July 2006	24 September 2008	87	58	17	12	200	68	+132	66.67
Viktoria Plzeň	8 October 2008	15 December 2013	231	134	51	46	453	247	+206	58.01
Czech Republic	1 January 2014	30 June 2016	25	10	5	10	41	36	+5	40.00
Anzhi Makhachkala	30 June 2016	30 December 2016	19	7	5	7	19	19	+0	36.84
Viktoria Plzeň	1 July 2017	17 December 2019	117	69	22	26	204	131	+73	58.97
Ludogorets Razgrad	18 December 2019	25 October 2020	28	15	6	7	57	28	+29	53.57
Sparta Prague	3 February 2021	9 May 2022	73	44	11	18	152	95	+57	60.27
Baník Ostrava	18 June 2022	10 October 2022	12	3	5	4	17	18	−1	25.00
Zlín	28 November 2022	23 October 2023	35	9	11	15	45	65	−20	25.71
Líšeň	18 December 2024	4 February 2025	0	0	0	0	0	0	+0	—
Career totals			697	369	149	179	1,249	807	+442	52.94
