= Martin Rozhon =

Czech footballer

Personal information
- Date of birth: 30 July 1965 (age 61)
- Position: Forward

Senior career*
Years	Team	Apps	(Gls)
–1996	Kaučuk Opava		
1997–1998	FC Petra Drnovice		
1998–1999	FC Karviná		
- * Club domestic league appearances and goals

Martin Rozhon (born 30 July 1965) is a retired Czech football striker.
