= Pavel Holomek =

Czech footballer

Patrik Holomek
Personal information
- Date of birth: 13 April 1972 (age 54)
- Place of birth: Brno, Czechoslovakia
- Height: 1.90 m (6 ft 3 in)
- Position: Forward

Youth career
- –1984: SK Bosonohy
- 1984–1990: FC Zbrojovka Brno

Senior career*
Years	Team	Apps	(Gls)
1990–1999	Boby Brno	182	(35)
1999–2003	FK Teplice	37	(5)
2003–2005	FK Drnovice	21	(2)
2005–2006	SC Reutz	4	(0)

International career
1998	Czech Republic B	3	(0)
- * Club domestic league appearances and goals

Pavel Holomek (born 13 April 1972) is a Czech former football player. He played in the Gambrinus liga for Brno, Teplice and Drnovice.

He made his debut for Brno in 1990. He announced his retirement from Czech football after scoring his last league goal in the 2004–05 Gambrinus liga on 25 May 2005.

== Honours ==
=== Club ===
FK Teplice

- Czech Cup: 2003

== Personal life ==
Pavel Holomek's younger brother, Patrik, also played professional football. After his football career, Holomek went on to sell windows.
