= Roman Hogen =

Czech footballer

Personal information
- Date of birth: 12 December 1970 (age 55)
- Position: Midfielder

Senior career*
Years	Team	Apps	(Gls)
1991–1993	FK Chmel Blšany		
1993–1994	FK Viktoria Žižkov		
1994–1996	SK Slavia Praha		
1996–1997	FK Chmel Blšany		
1997–1998	1. FC Nürnberg		
1998–2003	FK Chmel Blšany		
- * Club domestic league appearances and goals

Roman Hogen (born 12 December 1970) is a retired Czech football midfielder.
