= 1996–97 Czech 2. Liga =

2. česká fotbalová liga
- Season: 1996–1997
- Champions: Dukla
- Promoted: Dukla; Lázně Bohdaneč
- Relegated: Pardubice; Havířov
- Matches: 240
- Goals: 567 (2.36 per match)
- Top goalscorer: Václav Koloušek (18)
- Average attendance: 1,065

The 1996–97 Czech 2. Liga was the fourth season of the 2. česká fotbalová liga, the second tier of the Czech football league.

== League standings ==
| Pos | Team | Pld | W | D | L | GF | GA | GD | Pts | Promotion or relegation |
|---|---|---|---|---|---|---|---|---|---|---|
| 1 | Dukla (C, P) | 30 | 22 | 5 | 3 | 53 | 15 | +38 | 71 | Promotion to 1997–98 1. Liga |
| 2 | Lázně Bohdaneč (P) | 30 | 14 | 10 | 6 | 39 | 21 | +18 | 52 | Promotion to 1997–98 1. Liga |
| 3 | Zlín | 30 | 12 | 12 | 6 | 55 | 33 | +22 | 48 | |
| 4 | Přerov | 30 | 12 | 8 | 10 | 54 | 43 | +11 | 44 | |
| 5 | Blšany | 30 | 11 | 10 | 9 | 38 | 29 | +9 | 43 | |
| 6 | Vítkovice | 30 | 9 | 16 | 5 | 31 | 25 | +6 | 43 | |
| 7 | Chrudim | 30 | 10 | 10 | 10 | 39 | 22 | +17 | 40 | |
| 8 | Česká Lípa | 30 | 11 | 7 | 12 | 33 | 38 | −5 | 40 | |
| 9 | Ústí nad Labem | 30 | 9 | 11 | 10 | 24 | 30 | −6 | 38 | |
| 10 | Prostějov | 30 | 9 | 10 | 11 | 30 | 34 | −4 | 37 | |
| 11 | Frýdek-Místek | 30 | 8 | 12 | 10 | 35 | 40 | −5 | 36 | |
| 12 | Třinec | 30 | 9 | 8 | 13 | 29 | 44 | −15 | 35 | |
| 13 | Poštorná | 30 | 9 | 7 | 14 | 35 | 45 | −10 | 34 | |
| 14 | Uherské Hradiště | 30 | 8 | 9 | 13 | 25 | 46 | −21 | 33 | |
| 15 | Pardubice (R) | 30 | 8 | 7 | 15 | 31 | 50 | −19 | 31 | Relegation to 1997–98 ČFL |
| 16 | Havířov (R) | 30 | 4 | 8 | 18 | 20 | 56 | −36 | 20 | Relegation to 1997–98 MSFL (Note: Havířov subsequently withdrew and did not compete in the following season's MSFL.) |

Source: RSSSF
Rules for classification: 1) points; 2) goal difference; 3) number of goals scored.
(C) Champions; (P) Promoted; (R) Relegated

== Top goalscorers ==
| Rank | Scorer | Club | Goals |
|---|---|---|---|
| 1 | (Czech Republic) Václav Koloušek | Dukla | 18 |
| 2 | (Czech Republic) Roman Hogen | Blšany | 11 |
| 3 | (Czech Republic) Václav Činčal | Frýdek-Místek | 10 |
| 3 | (Czech Republic) Jan Haspra | Havířov | 10 |
| 3 | (Czech Republic) Lubomír Langer | Vítkovice | 10 |
| 3 | (Czech Republic) Rudolf Otepka | Zlín | 10 |
| 3 | (Czech Republic) Martin Svědík | Lázně Bohdaneč | 10 |
| 3 | (Czech Republic) Radek Šindelář | Poštorná | 10 |

== See also ==
- 1996–97 Czech First League
- 1996–97 Czech Cup
