= Vítězslav Tuma =

Czech footballer (born 1971)

Personal information
- Date of birth: 4 July 1971 (age 55)
- Place of birth: Nový Jičín, Czechoslovakia
- Height: 1.90 m (6 ft 3 in)
- Position: Forward

Youth career
- 1978–1989: TJ Nový Jičín

Senior career*
Years	Team	Apps	(Gls)
1989–1991	FC Vítkovice		
1991–1992	VTJ Znojmo		
1992–1993	Sabah		
1993–1994	FC Vítkovice	22	(4)
1994–1996	Baník Ostrava	26	(4)
1996	SK LeRK Prostějov	12	(5)
1996–1998	FC Karviná	33	(29)
1998–2002	Petra Drnovice	96	(45)
2002	Sparta Prague	6	(1)
2002	Marila Příbram	13	(0)
2003	Sigma Olomouc	8	(2)
2003–2004	FK Drnovice	19	(4)
- * Club domestic league appearances and goals

Vítězslav Tuma (born 4 July 1971) is a Czech former professional footballer who played as a forward. Besides the Czech Republic, he played in Malaysia.

A prolific goalscorer, Tuma was top scorer of Czech First League in the 2000–01 season with 15 goals.
