= TJ Jiskra Třeboň =

Jiskra Třeboň
- Full name: TJ Jiskra Třeboň, z.s.
- Founded: 1884
- Ground: Jiráskova
- Capacity: 1,500
- Manager: Miroslav Čížek
- League: Regional Championship (Jihočeský kraj)
- 2023–24: 4th

TJ Jiskra Třeboň is a Czech football club located in Třeboň. It currently plays in Regional Championship (Jihočeský kraj). The club has participated numerous times in the Czech Cup, reaching the third round in 2006–07 and 2007–08. The highest level they have competed at is the third tier, where they played for four seasons between 1997 and 2001.

== History ==
Jiskra Třeboň won Divize A of the Czech Fourth Division in the 1996–97 season. They subsequently played in the third tier Bohemian Football League until finishing 17th in the 2000–01 season, following which they returned to the Fourth Division. The 2006–07 season saw the club reach the third round of the Czech Cup, where a crowd of 550 saw them eliminated after losing a home match to Slovan Liberec 3–0. They met their target of a top-five position in the Fourth Division that season, finishing in 5th place. They subsequently reached the third round of the Czech Cup the following season.
