= FK Litvínov =

- Full name: Fotbalový klub Litvínov a.s.
- Founded: 1945
- Ground: Fotbalový stadion Lomská, Litvínov
- League: Regional Championship (Ústí nad Labem Region)
- 2023–24: 3rd
Home colours

FK Litvínov is a football club located in Litvínov, Czech Republic. The club currently plays in the Regional Championship (Ústí nad Labem Region). The club has taken part numerous times in the Czech Cup, reaching the third round in the 2005–06 edition.

== Honours ==
=== Domestic ===
- Přebor Ústeckého kraje
  - Champions (1): 2014–15
