= SK Rakovník =

Rakovník
- Full name: SK Rakovník, z.s.
- Founded: 1903; 122 years ago
- Ground: Městský areál SK Rakovník
- Capacity: 5,000
- Chairman: Abdulmouti Abdallah Kaaki
- Manager: Mohamed Ben Hassen
- League: I.A třída skupina A
- 2022–23: 11th
- Website: http://www.skrakovnik.com/

SK Rakovník is a Czech football club from the town of Rakovník in the Central Bohemian Region. The club currently plays in the I.A třída skupina A Středočeský kraj, which is the sixth tier of the Czech football system. The club played two seasons in the Czechoslovak First League.

== History ==
The club was founded in 1903 as Sportovní kroužek Rakovník, before changing to simply SK Rakovník the following year, following which they competed under the name until 1948. Rakovník took part in the top level of Czech football for the first time in the 1942–43 season. Their second and final season in the Czechoslovak First League was in 1945–46.

== Historical names ==
- 1903 – Sportovní kroužek Rakovník
- 1904 – SK Rakovník
- 1949 – Sokol Rakovník KZ
- 1951 – Sokol TOS Rakovník
- 1953 – Spartak Rakovník
- 1958 – Lokomotiva Rakovník
- 1967 – ČKZ Rakovník
- 1968 – SK Rakovník
- 1973 – ČKZ Rakovník
- 1991 – SK Rakovník
