= FK Slovan Pardubice =

- Full name: Fotbalový klub Slovan Pardubice
- Founded: 1919
- Dissolved: 2011
- 2009–10: 1st, 5.Liga (Pardubický kraj) (promoted)

FK Slovan Pardubice (Fotbalový klub Slovan Pardubice) was a Czech football club from the city of Pardubice which participated in the Czech 2. Liga, most recently in the 2005–06 season.

Slovan Pardubice merged with AFK Atlantic Lázně Bohdaneč in the 2000–2001 season, becoming known as FK AS Pardubice and taking Bohdaneč's position in the 2000–01 Czech 2. Liga.

The club changed its name in 2009, changing from former FK AS Pardubice (Fotbalový klub Atlantic Slovan Pardubice) to simply FK Slovan Pardubice.

The club played in Divize C at the fourth level of competition during the 2010–11 season, but subsequently withdrew and the club's results were expunged.
