= Fotbal Kunovice =

Kunovice
- Full name: Fotbal Kunovice
- Founded: 1932 (as SK Kunovice)
- Ground: Na Bělince
- Capacity: 3,000 (718 seated)
- League: Zlínský kraj 1.A třída skupina B (level 6)
- 2022–23: 9th

Fotbal Kunovice is a Czech football club located in Kunovice (Uherské Hradiště District). The club played four seasons in the Czech 2. Liga, from 2002–03 to 2005–06. Kunovice currently plays in the Zlínský kraj Regional Championship, which is in the fifth tier of Czech football.

== History ==
The club reached the Czech 2. Liga by winning the 2001–02 Moravian-Silesian Football League. They went on to finish 8th in the 2002–03 season, their first ever season at that level. Kunovice followed that up with finishes in 14th and 12th places in their second and third seasons in the league. In the 2005–06 season they finished 11th. Following the 2005–06 season, the club's management withdrew from professional competition due to financial difficulties and dropped down three levels on the Czech football pyramid to an amateur, regional league. Midway through the 2006–07 regional championship, during which the club was in last position, they withdrew from that competition too, and incurred a fine of 35,000 Czech koruna.

== Historical names ==
- 1932 — SK Kunovice
- 1953 — DSO Spartak Kunovice
- 1958 — TJ SPP Kunovice
- 1965 — TJ LET Kunovice
- 1988 — TJ Kunovice
- 1999 — FK Kunovice
- 2009 — Fotbal Kunovice

== Honours ==
- Moravian–Silesian Football League (third tier)
  - Champions 2001–02
