= FK Pelikán Děčín =

Pelikán Děčín
- Full name: FK Pelikán Děčín
- Founded: 1921
- Dissolved: 1998
- Ground: Městský fotbalový stadion, Děčín
- Final season 1997–98: 2nd in ČFL
Home colours

FK Pelikán Děčín was a Czech football club. They were founded in 1921. The club was dissolved in 1998 after finishing second in the 1997–98 season of the Bohemian Football League.

== Historical Names ==
- 1921–1945 SK Podmokly
- 1945–1946 I. ČSK Podmokly
- 1946–1947 SK Poštovní Podmokly
- 1947–1949 Sociakol Podmokly
- 1949 Sokol Sociakol Podmokly
- 1949–1953 Kovostroj Děčín
- 1953–1957 DSO Baník Děčín
- 1957–1958 TJ Baník Děčín
- 1958–1992 TJ Kovostroj Děčín
- 1992–1993 TJ Kovostroj Pelikán Děčín
- 1993–1998 FK Pelikán Děčín

== League history ==
Year – Position – Competition – Points

- 97/98 – 2 – ČFL – 62
- 96/97 – 4 – ČFL – 56
- 95/96 – 4 – ČFL – 68
- 94/95 – 2 – ČFL – 70
- 93/94 – 1 – Czech Fourth Division Group B – 49
- 92/93 – 9 – Czech Fourth Division Group B – 25
- 91/92 – 2 – Czech Fourth Division Group B – 38

== Czech Cup appearance ==
1996/97

- 3.Round: FK Pelikán Děčín – FK Teplice = 1:1 i.P.(6:5)
- 4.Round: FK Pelikán Děčín – SK Slavia Praha = 0:5
