= Karel Vácha =

Czech former football player (born 1970)

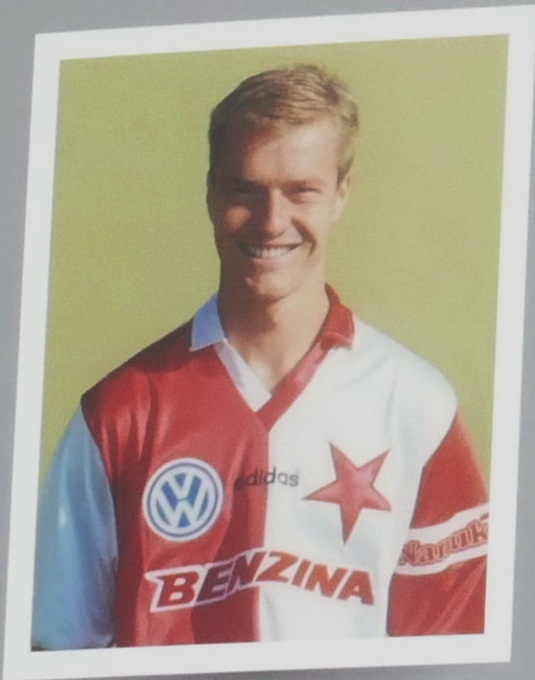

Personal information
- Date of birth: 2 August 1970 (age 56)
- Place of birth: České Budějovice, Czechoslovakia
- Position: Forward

Youth career
- 1977–1985: Hluboká nad Vltavou
- 1985–1989: SK Dynamo České Budějovice

Senior career*
Years	Team	Apps	(Gls)
1991–1996	SK České Budějovice	131	(43)
1996–1998	Slavia Prague	57	(21)
1998–2000	FC Tirol Innsbruck	31	(5)
2000–2003	SK Dynamo České Budějovice	49	(10)
2003	Artmedia Petržalka		

International career
1997	Czech Republic	1	(0)
- * Club domestic league appearances and goals

Karel Vácha (born 2 August 1970) is a Czech former football player, who played most notably for České Budějovice and Slavia Prague. He made 237 appearances in the Gambrinus liga and its predecessor, scoring 74 goals. He scored four goals in the 1997–98 UEFA Cup Winners' Cup with Slavia. He made one appearance for the Czech Republic, playing against the Faroe Islands on 6 September 1997.

== Playing career ==
Vácha was captain of the Budějovice side.

In 2003, he moved to Slovak club Artmedia Petržalka, where he scored twice on his debut in a 3–0 win against Košice.

== Later career ==
Vácha was appointed assistant coach to manager František Straka at České Budějovice in 2007.
