= Ladislav Fujdiar =

Czech footballer

Personal information
- Date of birth: 29 January 1967 (age 59)
- Place of birth: Kladno, Czechoslovakia
- Position: Striker

Youth career
- Kablo Kročehlavy

Senior career*
Years	Team	Apps	(Gls)
1989	Sparta Prague	0	(0)
1989–2001	České Budějovice	191	(37)
1993	→ Sigma Olomouc (loan)	13	(1)
1994	→ Baník Ostrava (loan)	14	(5)
1994	→ Sigma Olomouc (loan)	1	(0)
- * Club domestic league appearances and goals

Ladislav Fujdiar (born 29 January 1967) is a Czech retired footballer who played as a striker. He is a notable personality of SK Dynamo České Budějovice, where he played for twelve seasons.

== Career ==
Fujdiar was raised in Kablo Kročehlavy alongside his two brothers.

For twelve seasons between 1989 and 2001, he played for Dynamo České Budějovice and became a notable personality of the club. He spent one season on loan at Sigma Olomouc and Baník Ostrava. He played 191 league matches for Dynamo České Budějovice (the most in its history) and scored 37 goals (the second-best scorer in history). In 2001, he left for the club Union Perg, playing in the regional Austrian competition.

After retiring from football, he became the chairman of the football club in Planá.
