= SK Dolní Kounice =

- Full name: SK Dolní Kounice
- Founded: 1921
- Ground: Stadion SK Dolní Kounice, z.s.
- Capacity: 3,136 (636 seated)
- League: Okresní přebor muži, Brno - venkov (level 5)
- 2022–23: 8th

SK Dolní Kounice is a Czech football club from the town of Dolní Kounice, most notable for its participation in the Czech 2. Liga in the 2002–03 season. It currently plays in the Okresní přebor muži, Brno - venkov league, which is at level 5 of the football pyramid.

== Historical names ==
- 1921 SK Dolní Kounice
- 1948 Sokol Dolní Kounice
- 1952 ZSJ STS Dolní Kounice
- 1953 TJ Dynamo Dolní Kounice
- 1993 SK Dolní Kounice
- 1996 FC Roubina Dolní Kounice
- 2000 FC Group Dolní Kounice
- 2004 fusion with FC Tatran Brno-Kohoutovice
- 2007 newfounding as SK Dolní Kounice
