= FK Chmel Blšany =

Czech football club, based in Blšany

Blšany
- Full name: FK Chmel Blšany
- Nickname: Chmelaři
- Founded: 1946 (as Sokol Blšany)
- Dissolved: 2016
- Ground: Městský Stadium, Blšany
- Capacity: 2,300
- Website: www.fkchmelblsany.cz
Home colours

FK Chmel Blšany was a Czech football club based in the village of Blšany. The club played in the Czech First League between 1998 and 2006 and was the first professional club of goalkeeper Petr Čech. The club disbanded in 2016 after resigning from the 2016-17 regional championship (5th tier of the Czech Republic football league system).

The club was established as Sokol Blšany in 1946. The club played at the Městský Stadion with capacity of 2,300 seats. That meant that even with every citizen of Blšany village in the stand, there would be still about 1,500 free seats.

== History ==
FK Chmel Blšany was founded in 1946 as Sokol Blšany. Only amateur football was played in Blšany for a long time. In 1988, the team managed to reach the division and three years later the third Czechoslovak league. In 1993, FK Chmel Blšany reached the second league and in 1998 the first. In the 1998–99 season, FK Blšany astonished the Czech Republic and achieved 6th place. In 2005–06, the team ended up last and were relegated to the second league. In 2006–07, their first season back in the 2. Liga, they finished eighth but were relegated to the third-tier ČFL due to not receiving a license from the league due to financial reasons. They finished last in the ČFL with just four wins in the 2007–08 season and were subsequently relegated for the third time in as many seasons. It did not get better in 2008–09 when, upon finishing 14th of 16 teams in Divize B of the Czech Fourth Division, they were relegated for the fourth time in a row, partially due to a three-point deduction due to financial concerns. In 2009–10 they finished third in the fifth-tier Ústí Region championship and avoided relegation for the first time since the 2004–05 season. At the end of the 2010–11 season, Blšany gained promotion back to the Czech Fourth Division.

Notable past players include Petr Čech (1999–2001), Jan Šimák (1996–2000), Jan Velkoborský (1999–2003), Jiří Němec (2002–2003), Daniel Kolář (2005), Patrik Gedeon (1995–2001 & 2007) and Štěpán Vachoušek (2001).

=== Historical names ===
- 1946 – Sokol Blšany
- 1985 – JZD Blšany
- 1991 – SK Chmel Blšany
- 1992 – FK Chmel Blšany

== Managers ==
- František Plass (1988–92)
- František Cipro (1992–1994)
- Zdeněk Ščasný (1995)
- Miroslav Beránek (1996 – Dec 2001)
- Günter Bittengel (Dec 2001 – Oct 2003)
- Michal Bílek (Oct 2003 – Jun 2006)
- Přemysl Bičovský (Jun 2006 – 2007)
- Josef Němec (2009 – )

== History in domestic competitions ==
- 1993–98 Czech 2. Liga
- 1998–06 Czech First League
- 2006–07 Czech 2. Liga
- 2007–08 Bohemian Football League
- 2008–09 Czech Fourth Division – Divize B

- Seasons spent at Level 1 of the football league system: 8
- Seasons spent at Level 2 of the football league system: 6
- Seasons spent at Level 3 of the football league system: 1
- Seasons spent at Level 4 of the football league system: 1

=== Czech Republic ===
Season	League	Placed	Pld	W	D	L	GF	GA	GD	Pts	Cup
1993–1994	2. liga	7th	30	12	7	11	42	38	+4	31	
1994–1995	2. liga	10th	34	13	9	12	49	45	+4	48	Round of 16
1995–1996	2. liga	11th	30	8	13	9	28	31	–3	37	
1996–1997	2. liga	5th	30	11	10	9	38	29	+9	43	
1997–1998	2. liga	1st	30	21	3	4	64	17	+47	66	Round of 16
1998–1999	1. liga	6th	30	12	6	12	48	44	+4	42	Round of 32
1999–2000	1. liga	10th	30	10	7	13	28	45	–17	37	Round of 16
2000–2001	1. liga	10th	30	10	10	10	35	35	0	40	Semi-finals
2001–2002	1. liga	14th	30	8	5	17	35	51	–16	29	Round of 32
2002–2003	1. liga	14th	30	7	7	16	28	39	–11	28	Round of 64
2003–2004	1. liga	13th	30	8	6	16	34	54	–20	30	Quarter-finals
2004–2005	1. liga	12th	30	7	11	12	25	38	–13	32	Round of 64
2005–2006	1. liga	16th	30	5	11	14	22	44	–22	26	Round of 16
2006–2007	2. liga	8th	30	11	5	14	27	33	–6	38	First round
2007–2008	3. liga	18th	34	4	4	26	25	95	–70	16	First round
2008–2009	4. liga	14th									–

== European record ==
Season	Tournament	Round	Country	Club	Result
2000	UEFA Intertoto Cup	2R	(Belarus)	Dnepr Mogilev	6–2, 2–0
2000	UEFA Intertoto Cup	3R	(Greece)	Kalamata	5–0, 3–0
2000	UEFA Intertoto Cup	Semi-final	(Czech Republic)	Sigma Olomouc	1–3, 0–0
2001	UEFA Intertoto Cup	3R	(North Macedonia)	Pobeda	0–0, 1–0
2001	UEFA Intertoto Cup	Semi-final	(Italy)	Brescia	1–2, 2–2

== Honours ==
- Czech 2. Liga (second tier)
  - Champions (1): 1997–98
