= HFK Přerov =

- Full name: Hanácký fotbalový klub Přerov
- Founded: 1951
- Dissolved: 2001
- Ground: Městský stadion, Přerov

HFK Přerov was a football club from Přerov in the Olomouc Region of the Czech Republic. The club played in the Czech 2. Liga for three seasons between 1996–97 and the 1998–99 season, being known under the name FK PS Přerov in the 1996–97 season. The club was relegated from the second league in 1999 and did not take part in the following season's Moravian–Silesian Football League.

== Historical names ==
- 1951 – Spartak Přerov
- 1953 – DSO Spartak Přerov (Dobrovolná sportovní organizace Spartak Přerov)
- TJ Spartak PS Přerov (Tělovýchovná jednota Spartak Přerovské strojírny Přerov)
- 1993 – FK PS Přerov (Fotbalový klub Přerovské strojírny Přerov)
- 1995 – fusion with FK LMCH LET Přerov, name unchanged
- 1996 – fusion with FC Alfa Slušovice, name unchanged
- 1997 – FK Hanácká kyselka Přerov (Fotbalový klub Hanácká kyselka Přerov)
- 1999 – HFK Přerov (Hanácký fotbalový klub Přerov)
