= FC Slovácká Slavia Uherské Hradiště =

Uherské Hradiště
- Full name: FC Slovácká Slavia Uherské Hradiště
- Founded: 1894
- Dissolved: 2000, Succeeded by FC Slovácko
Home colours

FC Slovácká Slavia Uherské Hradiště was a Czech football club from the town of Uherské Hradiště, which played one season in the Czech First League. It was founded in 1894.

Uherské Hradiště won promotion to the country's top flight, the Czech First League, after finishing first in the 1994–95 Czech 2. Liga. The club subsequently featured in the 1995–96 Czech First League, under the name of FC JOKO Slovácká Slavia Uherské Hradiště, finishing bottom of the league and winning only three of their thirty matches. The low point of the season was losing 9–1 against Slavia Prague, a record victory for the Czech First League. The club dropped out of the second league after winning just twice in the 1997–98 Czech 2. Liga. In 2000 the club was merged with FC Synot from the town of Staré Město, becoming 1. FC Synot.

== History in domestic competitions ==
- 1993–94 Bohemian Football League
- 1994–95 Czech 2. Liga
- 1995–96 Czech First League
- 1996–98 Czech 2. Liga
- 1998–99 Bohemian Football League
- 1999–00 Czech Fourth Division – Divize D

- Seasons spent at Level 1 of the football league system: 1
- Seasons spent at Level 2 of the football league system: 3
- Seasons spent at Level 3 of the football league system: 2
- Seasons spent at Level 4 of the football league system: 1

=== Czech Republic ===
Season	League	Placed	Pld	W	D	L	GF	GA	GD	Pts	Cup
1993–1994	3. liga	1st	30	22	6	2	69	13	+56	50	
1994–1995	2. liga	1st	34	23	6	5	83	31	+52	75	
1995–1996	1. liga	16th	30	3	8	19	19	65	–46	17	
1996–1997	2. liga	14th	30	8	9	13	25	46	–21	33	
1997–1998	2. liga	15th	28	2	3	23	11	73	–62	9	Round of 32
1998–1999	3. liga	15th	30	4	9	17	20	63	–43	21	First Round
1999–2000	4. liga	1st	30	17	6	7	43	25	+18	57	First Round

== Honours ==
- Czech 2. Liga (second tier)
  - Winners 1994–95
- Moravian–Silesian Football League (third tier)
  - Winners 1993–94
