= AFK Atlantic Lázně Bohdaneč =

Czech football club

- Full name: AFK Atlantic Lázně Bohdaneč
- Founded: 1918
- Dissolved: 2000
- Ground: Na Bašte

AFK Atlantic Lázně Bohdaneč was a Czech football club from the town of Lázně Bohdaneč, which played one season in the Czech First League. It was founded in 1918.

Bohdaneč won promotion to the country's top flight, the Czech First League, after finishing second in the 1996–97 Czech 2. Liga. The club subsequently featured in the 1997–98 Czech First League, finishing bottom of the league and winning only two of their thirty matches.

During a 1999 Czech 2. Liga away match against Prostějov, club owner Jiří Novák ordered his players to walk off the pitch, with 43 minutes played and the score 2–1 to the hosts, citing the poor performance of referee Michal Paták as the reason. According to a spokesman from the ČMFS, this was the first time a professional team had abandoned a game in the league. The club was subsequently fined 300,000 CZK by the football association and the match was awarded 3–0 to Prostějov. The club ceased to exist in 2000, following a merger with Slovan Pardubice.

== Historical names ==
- 1918 – AFK Lázně Bohdaneč
- 1948 – Sokol Lázně Bohdaneč
- 1994 – AFK Atlantic Lázně Bohdaneč
- 2000 – merged with Slovan Pardubice

== History in domestic competitions ==
- 1994–95 Czech Fourth Division – Divize C
- 1995–96 Bohemian Football League
- 1996–97 Czech 2. Liga
- 1997–98 Czech First League
- 1998–00 Czech 2. Liga

- Seasons spent at Level 1 of the football league system: 1
- Seasons spent at Level 2 of the football league system: 3
- Seasons spent at Level 3 of the football league system: 1
- Seasons spent at Level 4 of the football league system: 1

=== Czech Republic ===
Season	League	Placed	Pld	W	D	L	GF	GA	GD	Pts	Cup
1994–1995	4. liga	1st	30	24	5	1	68	19	+49	77	
1995–1996	3. liga	1st	34	25	7	2	82	21	+61	82	Round of 16
1996–1997	2. liga	2nd	30	14	10	6	39	21	+18	52	Round of 16
1997–1998	1. liga	15th	30	2	5	23	18	61	–43	11	Round of 32
1998–1999	2. liga	7th	30	9	10	11	25	32	–7	37	Round of 32
1999–2000	2. liga	6th	30	11	10	9	36	33	+3	43	First Round

== Honours ==
- Czech 2. Liga (second tier)
  - Runners-up 1996–97
- Bohemian Football League (third tier)
  - Champions 1995–96
