= SK Tatran Poštorná =

Defunct association football club in Czech Republic

- Full name: Sportovní klub Tatran Poštorná
- Founded: 1930
- Dissolved: 2012 (merged with Sokol Ladná)
- Website: www.tatran.webz.cz/index2.html

SK Tatran Poštorná was a football club from Poštorná in the South Moravian Region of the Czech Republic. The club played in the Czech 2. Liga between 1995 and 2000. After finishing third in the 1995–96 Czech 2. Liga, the club had the chance for promotion to the Czech First League, but club chairman Rudolf Baránek instead elected to sell the first league license to fourth-placed side Bohemians 1905. The club was relegated from the second league at the end of the 1999–2000 season. They then played in the third-tier Bohemian Football League until being relegated in 2005.

== Historical names ==
- 1930 – SK Poštorná (Sportovní klub Poštorná)
- 1949 – JTO Sokol Poštorná (Jednotná tělovýchovná organisace Sokol Poštorná)
- 1951 – ZSJ Sokol TODOZA Poštorná (Závodní sokolská jednota Sokol Továrna dopravního zařízení Poštorná)
- 1952 – ZSJ Spartak Poštorná (Závodní sokolská jednota Spartak Poštorná)
- 1953 – DSO Baník Poštorná (Dobrovolná sportovní organisace Baník Poštorná)
- 1959 – TJ Tatran Poštorná (Tělovýchovná jednota Tatran Poštorná)
- 1962 – TJ Tatran PKZ Poštorná (Tělovýchovná jednota Poštorenské keramické závody Tatran Poštorná)
- 1988 – TJ Tatran Fosfa Poštorná (Tělovýchovná jednota Tatran Fosfa Poštorná)
- 1992 – FC Tatran Poštorná (Football Club Tatran Poštorná)
- 1999 – SK Tatran Poštorná (Sportovní klub Tatran Poštorná)
