= 1. FK Drnovice =

Drnovice
- Full name: 1. FK Drnovice
- Founded: 1932
- Dissolved: 2006
- Ground: Sportovní areál
- Capacity: 6,616

1. FK Drnovice was a Czech football club based in the village of Drnovice in the South Moravian Region. It was founded in 1932. The club played in the top flight of Czech football, the Czech First League, between 1993 and 2002, and again in the 2004/05 season. Because of financial trouble, the club ceased to exist in 2006. Drnovice now hosts a small club FKD currently playing regional division.

== History ==
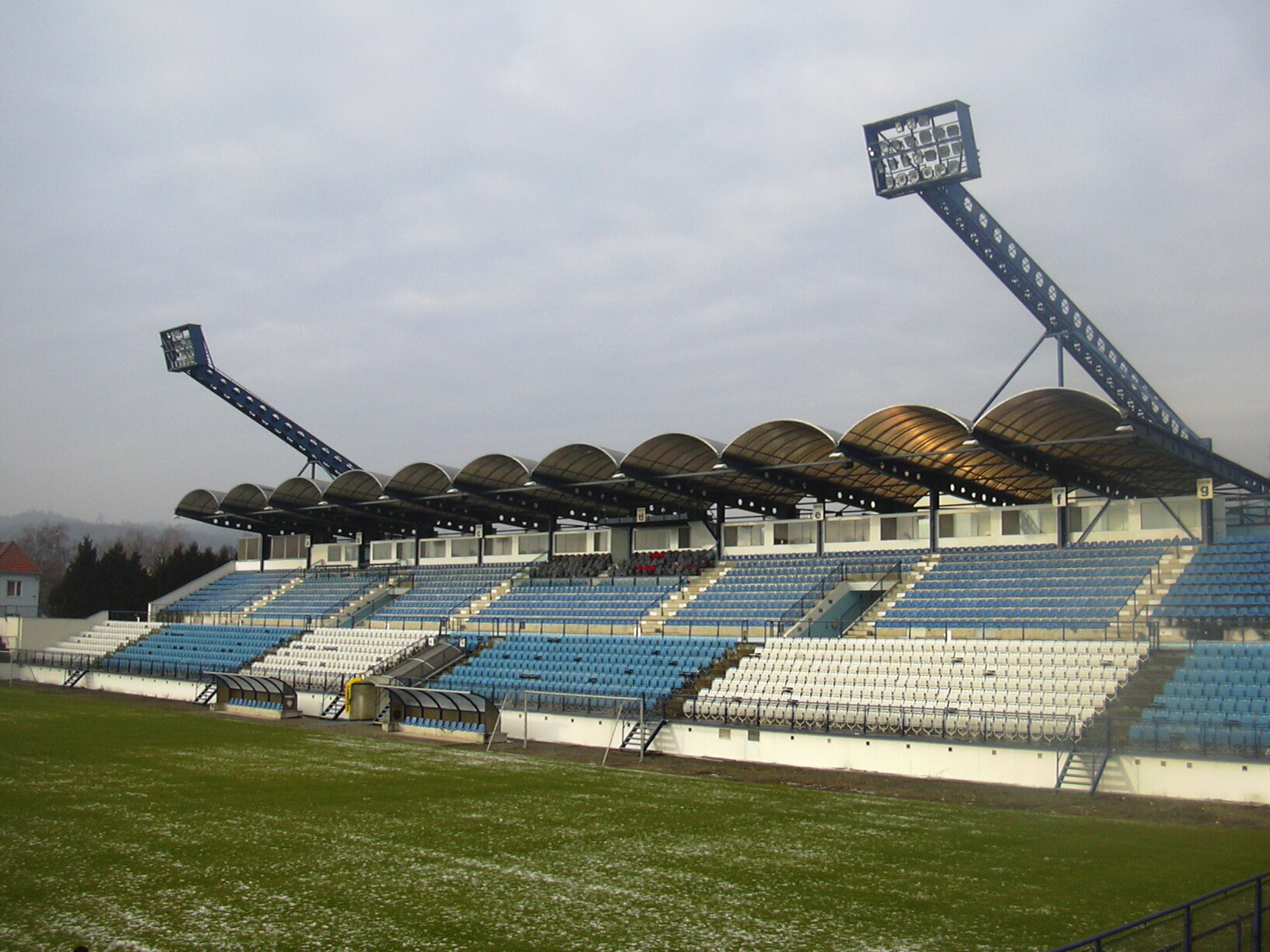
Football stadium of the club

Until the mid-1980s, the club of this small village with a population just under 2,200 was almost unknown outside the region. In 1977 it played in the 1.B třída, being the 8th tier in Czechoslovak football pyramid.

Everything changed when Jan Gottvald, a Drnovice-born former player took charge of the club in 1982. In those days Gottvald worked as a washing machine repairer and car seller only to become boss of Mototechna, a spare part company some time later.

The club reached Divize, the fourth tier, in 1986 and the 2. ČNL, the third division in 1987. 1990 saw the team promoted to Second division. After the breakup of Czechoslovakia in 1993, both Slovakia and the Czech Republic established their own leagues and Drnovice gained promotion to the First Division. Finally Gottvald has made his dream of First Division football in his native village come true.

In their first season, a doping scandal shocked not only Drnovice but the entire Czech football. In the so-called "caramel affair" Drnovice players Rostislav Prokop and Milan Poštulka were suspended for two years, the club itself was fined with a ridiculous small amount of 50.000 Czech crowns. As was revealed some time later, manager Jindřich Dejmal had given the players caramels that contained a forbidden substance. Dejmal was sacked by Gottvald immediately, appointing Karel Brückner as new manager.

In 1994 Gottvald sold the club to chemical company Chemapol for not having enough funds to keep the club running by himself alone. Nevertheless, he managed to keep his influence in the club. Moreover, he became the second most important official in Czech football when he was elected vice-chairman of the Czech FA. He held this position until the year 2000.

To promote their gas stations called Petra, the Chemapol Holding changed the club's name to FC Petra Drnovice. Chemapol not only financed the club, but also the construction of Drnovice's home ground. It met the international standards and even hosted a match between the Czech Republic and Switzerland on 18 August 1999 won by the Czech side 3:0.

In the 1990s, Petra Drnovice finished mid-table in all seasons. In 1996 and 1998 they reached the Czech Cup Final but lost to Sparta Prague and FK Jablonec respectively. In those years, Gottvald lost more and more of his influence and finally left the club after a controversy with the Chemapol CEO in 1998. Only one year later Chemapol surprisingly went bankrupt and sold Drnovice for 15 Million Czech Crowns to Persport that belonged to former tennis player Tomáš Petera. Some month later, Petera ceded the club to Jan Gottvald who became chairman of Drnovice again after five years. The 1999/2000 season saw the club reaching its best result in history when it finished third in the Czech First League. This success saw them qualify for the UEFA Cup the following season. In the preliminary round they beat FK Budućnost Banovići. In the first round they faced TSV 1860 Munich. After a goalless draw at home, Drnovice lost 1–0 in the Olympic Stadium in Munich.

Financial problems highlighted those years. Gottvald had great difficulties to keep the club running. From August 2000 on, the FK Drnovice filed for bankruptcy. In a dubious transaction in March 2001 Gottvald sold the club to a widely unknown company called Corimex. In October he left the club once again. He was accused of financial fraud and other white-collar crimes and imprisoned in February 2002. The club's financial problems became so immense that it was forced to sell nine players to Marila Příbram only some weeks before the end of the season. Manager Karel Jarůšek resigned as an answer to this move. Finishing only one place short of bottom, Drnovice were to be relegated to Second Division. However, the Czech Football Association denied them the licence. In Summer 2003 Drnovice had to restart from the MSFL, the third level. In February 2003 Drnovice-based company Garimondi purchased by auction what was left of the club and ceded it to Jan Gottvald, who once again took charge of the club after being set free on a 20 Million Czech crowns bail. Gottvald strengthened the squad, Drnovice won the MSFL without any problems. They finished as runner-up in the 2003/2004 season in Second Division and were promoted to the Czech First League. In the summer of 2004, Swiss-based company Sunstone acquired the club, that finished in 8th place. After failing to find other partners who would help funding football in Drnovice, Sunstone sold all shares to Jan Gottvald and his son Robert for approximately 10 Million Czech crowns, a sum which never was confirmed. Gottvald was unable to find sponsors and did not apply for a Gambrinus-Liga licence for the 2005/2006 season. In 2006, the club was playing in Second Czech Division and was still facing great financial troubles. In January the crisis reached its peak, as players had not received their salaries since July 2005. The team eventually left the league at the end of that season.

In 2007, some supporters of the club decided to revive the team and registered themselves as players and inviting veterans and also youngsters from the folded club and re-entered official competitions as FKD, but from the lowest level on the Czech league system. They got promoted right on the first season to the next level, averaging five goals per game and attendances as big as 600 (when the average is 50 in this league), being only defeated one time. In the 2008–2009 season, the team got its second promotion in a row to the first division of the county Vyškov (8th level in the Czech League system) and its B team also guaranteed promotion to the level below. The team achieved its third promotion in a row by winning the Vyškov county championship (Okresní přebor) in the 2009–10 season. In the 2010–11 and 2011–12 seasons, FKD played in the I.B division (I.B třída) of the South Moravian Region (Jihomoravský kraj), the seventh tier in the Czech league system, before being relegated back to the eighth tier in 2012.

== Historical names ==
- 1932 – Česká sportovní společnost Drnovice
- 1948 – Sokol Drnovice
- 1961 – TJ Drnovice
- 1989 – TJ JZD Drnovice
- 1990 – TJ Agro Drnovice
- 1990 – FC Gera Drnovice
- 1993 – FC Olpran Drnovice
- 1993 – FC Petra Drnovice
- 2000 – FK Drnovice
- 2003 – 1. FK Drnovice
- 2006 – 1. FKD

== Honours ==
- Moravian–Silesian Football League (third tier)
  - Champions 2002–03
- Czech Cup
  - Runners up (2): 1995–96, 1997–98
- third place in Czech First League 1999–2000

== Former managers ==
- Karel Brückner 1993/94 and 1994/95
- Ján Kocian 1997/98

== Statistics ==
Level/Season	82/83	83/84	84/85	85/86	86/87	87/88	88/89	89/90	90/91	91/92	92/93	93/94	94/95	95/96	96/97	97/98	98/99	99/00	00/01	01/02	02/03	03/04	04/05	05/06
Level 1												10.	6.	5.	7.	9.	11.	3.	7.	15.			8.
Level 2									14.	6.	2.											2.
Level 3						4.	9.	1.													1.
Level 4					1.
Level 5				1.
Level 6		5.	1.
Level 7	1.
