= 2002–03 Czech Cup =

Pohár ČMFS

Tournament details
- Country: Czech Republic
- Teams: 134

Final positions
- Champions: Teplice
- Runners-up: Jablonec

The 2002–03 Czech Cup was the tenth edition of the annual football knockout tournament organized by the Czech Football Association of the Czech Republic.

FK Teplice prevailed at the 27 May 2003 Cup and qualified for the 2003–04 UEFA Cup.

== Teams ==
Round	Clubs remaining	Clubs involved	Winners from previous round	New entries this round	Leagues entering at this round
Preliminary round	134	44	none	44	Levels 4 and 5 in football league pyramid
First round	112	96	22	74	Czech 2. Liga; Bohemian Football League; Moravian-Silesian Football League; Czech Fourth Division
Second round	64	64	48	16	Czech First League
Third round	32	32	32	none	none
Fourth round	16	16	16	none	none
Quarter finals	8	8	8	none	none
Semi finals	4	4	4	none	none
Final	2	2	2	none	none

== Preliminary round ==
Team 1	Score	Team 2
Vršovice	0–2	Vyšehrad
Libuš	1–4	Brandýs nad Labem
Stříbrná Skalice	3–1	Čáslav
Dobrovice	3–0	Libiš
Manětín	0–3	Přeštice
Doubravka	1–0	Rokycany
Kamenný Újezd	1–5	Písek
Hluboká nad Vltavou	1–1; 4-3 pen	Tábor
Předměřice	1–0	Choceň
Ústí nad Orlicí	2–0	Rychnov nad Kněžnou
Meziboří	1–2	Ústí nad Labem
Braňany	1–0	Litvínov
Žirovnice	0–1	Třeboň
Šlapanice	1–1; 2-3 pen	Břeclav
Vyškov	4–2	Lipová
Morkovice	0–0; 2-4 pen	Hulín
Dolní Němčí	2–0	Brumov
Lhota u Vsetína	4–2	Valašské Meziříčí
Beňov	0–3	Lipník
Jakubčovice	0–0; 5-4 pen	Refotal Albrechtice
Hlučín	5–1	Orlová
Rýmařov	3–1	Město Albrechtice

== Round 1 ==
Team 1	Score	Team 2
Vyšehrad	0–2	Krč
Břevnov	1–1; 3-1 pen	Neratovice
Satalice	2–1	Velim
Stříbrná Skalice	0–1	Kolín
Uhelné sklady	0–8	Střížkov
Přeštice	1–1; 3-4 pen	Klatovy
Vejprnice	1–4	Viktoria Plzeň
Braňany	2–1	Karlovy Vary/Dvory
Třeboň	1–0	Kaplice
Písek	1–3	Sezimovo Ústí
Benešov	0–4	Xaverov
Rakovník	2–2; 8-9 pen	Chomutov
Ústí nad Labem	2–3	Varnsdorf
Neštěmice	0–3	Most
Předměřice	0–2	Svitavy
Štětí	1–0	Čelákovice
Brandýs nad Labem	0–3	Sibřina
Český Dub	2–2; 6-5 pen	Trutnov
Dobrovice	0–1	AS Pardubice
Doubravka	1–1; 4-5 pen	Milín
Litoměřice	1–1; 4-1 pen	Mladá Boleslav
Hluboká nad Vltavou	0–2	Prachatice
Roudnice nad Labem	1–1; 5-4 pen	Admira/Slavoj
Náchod	4–0	Semily
Ústí nad Orlicí	0–0; 9-10 pen	Chrudim
Kadaň	0–3	Kladno
Velké Losiny	2–2; 2-3 pen	Letohrad
Znojmo	2–2; 1-3 pen	Jihlava
Třebíč	1–2	Dolní Kounice
Břeclav	0–1	Poštorná
Vyškov	0–2	Dosta Bystrc
Mutěnice	1–0	Baník Ratíškovice
Kroměříž	2–0	Drnovice
Kyjov	1–4	Kunovice
Dolní Němčí	1–2	Bystřice pod Hostýnem
Lhota u Vsetína	0–2	Slavičín
Slušovice	1–0	Dukla Hranice
Hulín	4–0	LeRK Prostějov
Lipník	0–2	HFK Olomouc
Horká n.M.	0–3	Uničov
Rýmařov	3–0	Zábřeh
Hranice	3–0	Opava
Nový Jičín	0–5	Vítkovice
Petrovice	0–7	Frýdek-Místek
Hlučín	3–1	Dolní Benešov
Český Těšín	0–1	Třinec
Jakubčovice	5–1	Vratimov
Dětmarovice	4–0	Karviná

== Round 2 ==
Team 1	Score	Team 2
Varnsdorf	0–3	Liberec
Dolní Kounice	3–1	Jihlava
Slušovice	0–9	Zlín
Mutěnice	1–2	Poštorná
Satalice	0–8	Slavia Prague
Svitavy	2–0	Chrudim
Náchod	0–4	Hradec Králové
Rýmařov	1–3	HFK Olomouc
Dosta Bystrc	0–4	1. FC Brno
Slavičín	0–3	Kunovice
Český Dub	0–5	Jablonec
Roudnice nad Labem	5–1	Litoměřice
Klatovy	0–4	Marila Příbram
Štětí	1–2	Střížkov
Sibřina	0–4	Bohemians Prague
Třeboň	1–2	Prachatice
Kolín	0–1	Žižkov
Braňany	0–1	Most
Chomutov	2–0	Blšany
Břevnov	1–1; 5-4 pen	Krč
Kladno	0–1	Teplice
Hulín	2–3	Kroměříž
Uničov	1–5	Sigma Olomouc
Jakubčovice	0–2	Hranice
Dětmarovice	0–7	Baník Ostrava
Hlučín	4–1	Frýdek-Místek
Bystřice pod Hostýnem	0–4	FC Synot
Třinec	0–4	Vítkovice
Sezimovo Ústí	0–4	České Budějovice
Milín	1–3	Viktoria Plzeň
Xaverov	0–2	AS Pardubice
Letohrad	1–4	Sparta Prague

== Round 3 ==
Team 1	Score	Team 2
Dolní Kounice	0–3	Liberec
Poštorná	1–2	Zlín
Svitavy	2–5	Slavia Prague
HFK Olomouc	1–0	Hradec Králové
Kunovice	0–2	1. FC Brno
Roudnice nad Labem	0–4	Jablonec
Střížkov	0–4	Marila Příbram
Prachatice	0–0; 4-2 pen	Bohemians Prague
Most	1–1; 4-5 pen	Žižkov
Břevnov	0–2	Chomutov
Kroměříž	0–3	Teplice
Hranice	0–2	Sigma Olomouc
Hlučín	1–4	Baník Ostrava
Vítkovice	3–2	FC Synot
Viktoria Plzeň	0–0; 2-3 pen	České Budějovice
AS Pardubice	1–2	Sparta Prague

== Round 4 ==
Team 1	Score	Team 2
Liberec	0–2	Zlín
HFK Olomouc	0–2	Slavia Prague
Jablonec	2–1	1. FC Brno
Prachatice	0–3	Marila Příbram
Chomutov	1–3	Žižkov
Teplice	1–0	Sigma Olomouc
Vítkovice	0–2	Baník Ostrava
Sparta Prague	0–4	České Budějovice

== Quarterfinals ==
Team 1	Score	Team 2
Baník Ostrava	0–2	Zlín
Teplice	3–0	Slavia Prague
České Budějovice	3–1	Marila Příbram
Žižkov	2–4	Jablonec

== Semifinals ==
Team 1	Score	Team 2
Zlín	1–1; 4-5 pen	Jablonec
České Budějovice	0–0; 4-5 pen	Teplice

== Final ==
27 May 2003
18:00 CEST

FK Jablonec	0–1	FK Teplice
		56' Hunal

Stadion Evžena Rošického, Prague
Attendance: 5,833
Referee: Lubomír Puček

== See also ==
- 2002–03 Czech First League
- 2002–03 Czech 2. Liga
