= 2001–02 Czech Cup =

Pohár ČMFS

Tournament details
- Country: Czech Republic
- Teams: 130

Final positions
- Champions: Slavia Prague
- Runners-up: Sparta Prague

The 2001–02 Czech Cup was the ninth edition of the annual football knockout tournament organized by the Czech Football Association of the Czech Republic.

Slavia Prague prevailed at the 13 May 2002 Cup and qualified for the 2002–03 UEFA Cup.

== Teams ==
Round	Clubs remaining	Clubs involved	Winners from previous round	New entries this round	Leagues entering at this round
Preliminary round	130	36	none	36	Levels 4 and 5 in football league pyramid
First round	112	96	18	78	Czech 2. Liga; Bohemian Football League; Moravian-Silesian Football League; Czech Fourth Division
Second round	64	64	48	16	Czech First League
Third round	32	32	32	none	none
Fourth round	16	16	16	none	none
Quarter finals	8	8	8	none	none
Semi finals	4	4	4	none	none
Final	2	2	2	none	none

== Preliminary round ==
38 teams were originally scheduled to take part in the preliminary round; however, the match between Rousínov and Dosta Bystrc was not played and both teams advanced to round 1 along with the winners of the other 18 matches.

Team 1	Score	Team 2
Chabry	4–0	SK Motorlet Prague
Libiš	2–0	Brandýs nad Labem
Stř. Skalice	2–3	Český Brod
Braňany	2–1	Kadaň
Český Dub	1–1; 7-6 pen	Hamry/Tanvald
Ústí nad Orlicí	2–1	Rychnov nad Kněžnou
Vodňany	2–1	Strakonice
Doubravka	4–0	Chlumčany
Svitavy	1–2	Velké Losiny
Rousínov	Not played	Dosta Bystrc
Mutěnice	2–1	Břeclav
Lhota u Vsetína	2–3	Slušovice
T.Mikulovice	1–3	Město Albrechtice
Chropyně	0–0; 1-4 pen	Napajedla
Lipová	3–3; 4-5 pen	Rýmařov
Hlavnice	1–1; 6-5 pen	Bílovec
Horka na Moravě	1–0	DU Hranice
V.Meziříčí	1–1; 7-6 pen	Orlová
Český Těšín	2–1	R.Albrechtice

== Round 1 ==
78 teams entered the competition at this stage. Along with the 18 winners from the preliminary round, these teams played 48 matches to qualify for the second round.

Team 1	Score	Team 2
Chabry	2–0	Admira/Slavoj
Uhelné sklady	0–4	SK Kladno
Břevnov	2–1	Rakovník
Satalice	0–2	SC Xaverov H.Počernice
Smíchov	2–7	Sparta Krč
Libiš	1–4	Čelákovice
Benešov	2–1	Střížkov
Velim	1–2	Mladá Boleslav
Český Brod	w/o	FK AS Pardubice
Sibřina	2–4	FK Mogul Kolín
Kralupy	0–4	SK Spolana Neratovice
Ústí nad Labem	1–0	Roudnice nad Labem
Štětí	2–0	Litoměřice
Braňany	2–4	FK Chomutov
Litvínov	1–6	FC MUS Most
Neštěmice	0–3	Varnsdorf
Český Dub	0–3	Semily
Deštné	1–0	Trutnov
Ždirec	2–1	Letohrad
Ústí nad Orlicí	1–1; 4-3 pen	Olymp. Hradec Králové
Choceň	2–2; 3-5 pen	Chrudim
Tábor	1–0	Třeboň
Sezimovo Ústí	0–5	SK České Budějovice
Vodňany	0–3	Prachatice
Vejprnice	3–1	Klatovy
Přeštice	0–5	FC Viktoria Plzeň
Doubravka	3–0	Rokycany
Tachov	0–0; 3-1 pen	Karlovy Vary – Dvory
Slavia Třebíč	1–5	FC Vysočina Jihlava
Velké Losiny	0–3	Zábřeh
Rousínov	2–0	Dosta Bystrc
Poštorná	1–2	FK Baník Ratíškovice
Kyjov	1–0	SK LeRK Prostějov
Mutěnice	2–0	Dolní Kounice
Slušovice	3–3; 5-6 pen	Kroměříž
Hulín	1–7	Kunovice
Město Albrechtice	0–3	Dolní Benešov
Napajedla	1–4	1. HFK Olomouc
Znojmo	1–7	FK Zlín
Slavičín	3–1	Brumov
Rýmařov	3–1	Uničov
Hlavnice	1–6	SK Hranice
Horka na Moravě	0–0; 3-2 pen	Nový Jičín
V.Meziříčí	1–3	Bystřice P.H.
VP Frýdek/Místek	0–3	FC Vítkovice
Petrovice	0–2	Vratimov
Dětmarovice	3–1	Fotbal Třinec
Český Těšín	2–0	FC Karviná

== Round 2 ==
Team 1	Score	Team 2
Chabry	1–8	Sparta Prague
Břevnov	0–0; 4-5 pen	Kladno
Dolní Benešov	1–1; 4-3 pen	Opava
Dětmarovice	3–5	Český Těšín
Xaverov	0–3	Viktoria Žižkov
Sparta Krč	1–1; 6-5 pen	Čelákovice
Benešov	3–4	Jablonec
Mladá Boleslav	1–0	AS Pardubice
Mogul Kolín	1–2	Bohemians Prague
Ústí nad Labem	0–2	Spolana Neratovice
Štětí	0–2	Teplice
Rousínov	0–3	Vysočina Jihlava
Mutěnice	0–3	Stavo Brno
Slavičín	2–2; 4-2 pen	Baník Ratíškovice
Vejprnice	3–6	Marila Příbram
Doubravka	1–3	Viktoria Plzeň
Zábřeh	0–2	Sigma Olomouc
Rýmařov	1–1; 2-3 pen	HFK Olomouc
Vratimov	0–8	Baník Ostrava
Hranice	4–3	Vítkovice
Kroměříž	0–3	Drnovice
Kyjov	1–0	Bystřice pod Hostýnem
Tachov	1–8	Chmel Blšany
Most	2–1	Chomutov
Varnsdorf	1–4	Liberec
Deštné	2–0	Semily
Kunovice	1–3	FC Synot
Horka na Moravě	0–4	Zlín
Ždírec	1–5	Hradec Králové
Ústí nad Orlicí	3–0	Chrudim
Tábor	0–4	Slavia Prague
Prachatice	2–2; 4-2 pen	České Budějovice

== Round 3 ==
The third round was played between 6 October and 13 November 2001.

Team 1	Score	Team 2
Kladno	0–2	Sparta Prague
Český Těšín	0–1	Dolní Benešov
Sparta Krč	1–4	Viktoria Žižkov
Mladá Boleslav	1–0	Jablonec
Spolana Neratovice	0–3	Bohemians Prague
Vysočina Jihlava	1–2	Teplice
Slavičín	0–3	Stavo Brno
Viktoria Plzeň	0–2	Marila Příbram
HFK Olomouc	0–2	Sigma Olomouc
Hranice	0–1	Baník Ostrava
Kyjov	2–2; 1-3 pen	Drnovice
Most	2–1	Chmel Blšany
Deštné	0–0; 4-5 pen	Liberec
Zlín	7–1	FC Synot
Ústí nad Orlicí	0–3	Hradec Králové
Prachatice	0–2	Slavia Prague

== Round 4 ==
The fourth round was played between 5 and 13 March 2002.

Team 1	Score	Team 2
Dolní Benešov	1–3	Sparta Prague
Mladá Boleslav	1–0	Viktoria Žižkov
Teplice	1–0	Bohemians Prague
Marila Příbram	2–0	Stavo Brno
Sigma Olomouc	0–0; 2-3 pen	Baník Ostrava
Most	2–0	Drnovice
Zlín	0–0; 2-3 pen	Liberec
Slavia Prague	3–0	Hradec Králové

== Quarterfinals ==
The quarterfinals were played on 2 and 3 April 2002.

Team 1	Score	Team 2
Sparta Prague	2–1	Marila Příbram
Most	2–0	Teplice
Baník Ostrava	0–0; 5-4 pen	Mladá Boleslav
Slavia Prague	2–1	Liberec

== Semifinals ==
The semifinals were played on 23 and 24 April 2002.

Team 1	Score	Team 2
Sparta Prague	2–0	Most
Slavia Prague	1–0	Baník Ostrava

== Final ==
13 May 2002
16:00 CEST

Sparta Prague	1–2	Slavia Prague
J. Novotný 21'		2', 12' T. Došek

Stadion Evžena Rošického, Prague
Attendance: 8,820
Referee: Karel Vidlák

== See also ==
- 2001–02 Czech First League
- 2001–02 Czech 2. Liga
