= 1999–2000 Czech Cup =

Pohár ČMFS

Tournament details
- Country: Czech Republic
- Teams: 134

Final positions
- Champions: Slovan Liberec
- Runners-up: Baník Ratíškovice

The 1999–2000 Czech Cup was the seventh edition of the annual football knockout tournament organized by the Czech Football Association of the Czech Republic.

Slovan Liberec prevailed at the 10 May 2000 Cup and qualified for the 2000–01 UEFA Cup.

== Teams ==
Round	Clubs remaining	Clubs involved	Winners from previous round	New entries this round	Leagues entering at this round
Preliminary round	134	44	none	44	Levels 4 and 5 in football league pyramid
First round	112	96	22	74	Czech 2. Liga; Bohemian Football League; Moravian-Silesian Football League; Czech Fourth Division
Second round	64	64	48	16	Czech First League
Third round	32	32	32	none	none
Fourth round	16	16	16	none	none
Quarter finals	8	8	8	none	none
Semi finals	4	4	4	none	none
Final	2	2	2	none	none

== Preliminary round ==
44 teams took part in the preliminary round.

Team 1	Score	Team 2
Sezimovo Ústí	1–1; 5-4 pen	Čížová
Rokycany	3–4	Chlumčany
Velké Hamry	1–3	Český Dub
Heřmanův Městec	0–3	SN. Pardubice
Černolice	0–1	Motorlet
Kaplice	1–1; 4-5 pen	Strakonice
Klatovy	5–1	Přeštice
Meteor Louny	1–0	Žatec
Česká Třebová	1–2	Choceň
Sibřina	3–2	Český Brod
Tábor	0–5	ČZU Praha
Bělá p. Bezdězem	2–1	Štětí
Holice v Čechách	1–3	Olympia H. Králové
Tachov	1–2	Kadaň
Loko Petrovice	2–1	Kravaře
Žulová	2–1	Šumperk
Hradčovice	1–3	Dolní Němčí
Sparta Brno	0–2	Bystrc
Dětmarovice	3–1	R. Albrechtice
Bystřice p.H.	2–2; 3-4 pen	Valašské Meziříčí
ČAFC Židenice	1–2	Slavkov u Brna
Bruntál	5–1	Krnov

== Round 1 ==
74 teams entered the competition at this stage. Along with the 22 winners from the preliminary round, these teams played 48 matches to qualify for the second round.

Team 1	Score	Team 2
Sezimovo Ústí	1–9	Třeboň
Vela US	1–1; 2-4 pen	Neratovice
Chlumčany	3–2	1.FC Plzeň
Roudnice	3–2	Rakovník
Český Dub	1–0	Trutnov
Litoměřice	2–3	Varnsdorf
SN. Pardubice	6–1	AFK Chrudim
Aritma Prague	1–0	Admira/Slavoj
Motorlet	0–3	Smíchov
Střížkov	3–0	Milín
Strakonice	2–1	Prachatice
Litvínov	0–8	Chomutov
Klatovy	0–5	Viktoria Plzeň
Neštěmice	0–1	Most
Meteor Louny	4–1	SK Kladno
Semily	1–0	Bohdaneč
Choceň	1–1; 2-4 pen	Rychnov n. K.
Čáslav	2–0	Semice
Sibřina	3–3; 3-5 pen	Čelákovice
Kralupy	0–3	Ml. Boleslav
ČZU Praha	2–0	Sparta Krč
Mogul Kolín	0–1	SC Počernice
Bělá p. Bezdězem	3–1	Česká Lípa
Olympia H.Králové	2–4	Letohrad
Kadaň	4–2	Karlovy Vary – Dvory
Slavičín	0–4	Brumov
Břeclav	1–0	Poštorná
Dolní Němčí	0–1	Ratíškovice
Valašské Meziříčí	0–0; 3-4 pen	D. Hranice
Dětmarovice	1–1; 3-2 pen	Třinec
SK Hranice	3–0	Přerov
Nový Jičín	0–1	Frýdek/Místek
Kroměříž	0–4	Polešovice
Chropyně	3–1	Napajedla
Mysločovice	1–2	Kunovice
BOPO Třebíč	0–5	Jihlava
Uh.Hradiště	1–3	FC Synot
Loko Petrovice	2–1	Karviná
Svitavy	4–3	LeRK Prostějov
M. Albrechtice	0–4	Dolní Benešov
Rýmařov	0–1	Uničov
Znojmo	1–5	Dolní Kounice
Žulová	1–6	Holice
Bruntál	0–4	Vítkovice
Slušovice	0–2	Zlín
Vratimov	1–0	NH Ostrava
Bystrc	0–1	Zeman Brno
Slavkov u Brna	1–2	Kyjov

== Round 2 ==
Team 1	Score	Team 2
Roudnice	0–8	Sparta Prague
Meteor Louny	1–4	Střížkov
Třeboň	3–1	České Budějovice
ČZU Praha	0–3	Viktoria Plzeň
SN. Pardubice	0–6	Hradec Králové
Semily	1–1; 5-4 pen	Letohrad
Neratovice	0–2	Viktoria Žižkov
Čáslav	1–4	Rychnov n. K.
Chropyně	0–8	Petra Drnovice
Brumov	0–1	Ratíškovice
Chlumčany	1–2	Blšany
Aritma Prague	1–6	SC Počernice
Strakonice	1–3	Dukla Příbram
Čelákovice	0–0; 5-4 pen	Ml. Boleslav
Chomutov	0–2	Slavia Prague
Zeman Brno	1–1; 7-6 pen	Jihlava
Uničov	0–2	Sigma Olomouc
Loko Petrovice	0–2	Dětmarovice
Frýdek-Místek	0–0; 1-4 pen	SFC Opava
Svitavy	1–1; 1-3 pen	Holice
D. Hranice	3–3; 1-4 pen	Baník Ostrava
FC Synot	1–3	Zlín
Český Dub	1–3	Jablonec
Bělá p. Bezdězem	1–9	Most
Varnsdorf	0–2	Slovan Liberec
Dolní Kounice	2–1	Kyjov
Břeclav	1–7	Boby Brno
Polešovice	0–3	Kunovice
Smíchov	1–4	Bohemians
SK Hranice	3–3; 2-4 pen	Vítkovice
Kadaň	1–0	FK Teplice
Dolní Benešov	2–1	Vratimov

== Round 3 ==
Team 1	Score	Team 2
Střížkov	1–2	Sparta Prague
Třeboň	1–4	Viktoria Plzeň
Semily	1–3	Hradec Králové
Rychnov n. K.	1–2	Viktoria Žižkov
Ratíškovice	1–0	Petra Drnovice
SC Počernice	0–1	Blšany
Čelákovice	1–1; 6-5 pen	Dukla Příbram
Zeman Brno	0–3	Slavia Prague
Dětmarovice	0–4	Sigma Olomouc
Holice	1–3	SFC Opava
Zlín	4–2	Baník Ostrava
Most	1–1; 2-3 pen	Jablonec
Dolní Kounice	1–3	Slovan Liberec
Kunovice	1–4	Boby Brno
Vítkovice	2–2; 2-0 pen	Bohemians
Kadaň	0–3	Dolní Benešov

== Round 4 ==
Čelákovice were the only team from the fourth level to take part in round 4.

Team 1	Score	Team 2
Viktoria Plzeň	1–0	Sparta Prague
Hradec Králové	0–0; 3-5 pen	Viktoria Žižkov
Ratíškovice	1–0	Blšany
Čelákovice	0–4	Slavia Prague
Sigma Olomouc	1–0	SFC Opava
Zlín	0–2	Jablonec
Slovan Liberec	3–1	Boby Brno
Dolní Benešov	1–1; 1-3 pen	Vítkovice

== Quarterfinals ==
The quarterfinals were played on 12 April 2000.

Team 1	Score	Team 2
Vítkovice	0–0; 3-2 pen	Jablonec
Sigma Olomouc	2–1 (a.e.t.)	Viktoria Žižkov
Slovan Liberec	2–0	Slavia Prague
Viktoria Plzeň	1–2	Ratíškovice

== Semifinals ==
The semifinals were played on 2 and 3 May 2000.

Team 1	Score	Team 2
Ratíškovice	3–0	Vítkovice
Liberec	1–0	Olomouc

== Final ==
10 May 2000
16:30 CEST

Baník Ratíškovice	1–2	Slovan Liberec
Hrozek 81'		24', 61' Lázzaro

Stadion Evžena Rošického, Prague
Attendance: 4,270
Referee: Miroslav Liba

== See also ==
- 1999–2000 Czech First League
- 1999–2000 Czech 2. Liga
