= 1998–99 Czech Cup =

Pohár ČMFS

Tournament details
- Country: Czech Republic
- Teams: 130

Final positions
- Champions: Slavia Prague
- Runners-up: Slovan Liberec

The 1998–99 Czech Cup was the sixth edition of the annual football knockout tournament organized by the Czech Football Association of the Czech Republic.

Slavia Prague prevailed at the 25 May 1999 Cup and qualified for the 1999–2000 UEFA Cup.

== Teams ==
Round	Clubs remaining	Clubs involved	Winners from previous round	New entries this round	Leagues entering at this round
Preliminary round	130	36	none	36	Levels 4 and 5 in football league pyramid
First round	112	96	18	78	Czech 2. Liga; Bohemian Football League; Moravian-Silesian Football League; Czech Fourth Division
Second round	64	64	48	16	Czech First League
Third round	32	32	32	none	none
Fourth round	16	16	16	none	none
Quarter finals	8	8	8	none	none
Semi finals	4	4	4	none	none
Final	2	2	2	none	none

== Preliminary round ==
36 teams took part in the preliminary round.

Team 1	Score	Team 2
Klatovy	2–0	Sušice
Humpolec	6–2	FK Tábor
Čech. Kralupy	1–1; 2-4 pen	Libočany
Ďáblice	0–1	Motorlet
Met. Louny	1–1; 4-5 pen	Kadaň
Hošek Robousy	2–4	Trutnov
FC Vela U.S.	3–0	Král. Dvůr
Chlumčany	0–2	Tachov
Štětí	1–3	Aritma Prague
Starta Brno	2–1	ČAFC Židenice
Sokol Prostějov	1–1; 2-4 pen	Chropyně
Břeclav	2–0	V.Pavlovice
Šardice	3–1	Dolní Němčí
Napajedla	2–2; 4-3 pen	Kroměříž
Slavičín	2–2; 5-3 pen	Polešovice
Rýmařov	w/o	M.Albrechtice
Kravaře	4–1	Šumperk
Skřečon	0–2	B.Albrechtice

== Round 1 ==
78 teams entered the competition at this stage. Along with the 18 winners from the preliminary round, these teams played 48 matches to qualify for the second round.

Team 1	Score	Team 2
Roudnice	1–4	Sparta Krč
Klatovy	2–0	Strakonice
SK Kladno	0–1	Bohemians
FC Vela U.S.	2–2; 3-5 pen	1. FC Plzeň
ČZU Praha	2–1	SK Smíchov
Přeštice	2–1	Milín
Mogul Kolín	1–3	Mladá Boleslav
Neštěmice	w/o	Děčín
Motorlet	0–4	Admira/Slavoj
Libočany	3–1	Rakovník
Litvínov	3–5	Kauč. Kralupy
Kadaň	1–3	Chomutov
Trutnov	1–3	Česká Lípa
Letohrad	1–2	Bohdaneč
Holice v Č.	2–2; 3-4 pen	SK Chrudim
SN Pardubice	2–1	Čelákovice
Prachatice	1–1; 4-2 pen	Třeboň
Tachov	2–2; 5-4 pen	Karlovy Vary – Dvory
Žatec	0–9	Most
Český Dub	2–0	Varnsdorf
Aritma Prague	0–3	Neratovice
Rychnov	1–0	AFK Chrudim
Humpolec	0–8	České Budějovice
Říčany	3–0	Český Brod
Střížkov	4–0	Semice
Olympia Hradec Králové	w/o	Turnov
Svitavy	0–4	Choceň
Starta Brno	3–0	Bopo Třebíč
Znojmo	4–2	Zeman Brno
Břeclav	2–4	Poštorná
Dol. Kounice	0–2	Jihlava
Šardice	0–3	Ratíškovice
Bystrc	1–2	Kyjov
Napajedla	0–4	Staré Město
Brumov	0–4	Zlín
Slavičín	4–1	Uh. Brod
Mysločovice	1–1; 3-2 pen	Uh.Hradiště
Trnava	0–1	Kunovice
Chropyně	0–4	Holice u Ol.
Uničov	2–3	LeRK Prostějov
Dukla Hranice	0–0; 1-4 pen	Přerov
M.Albrechtice	1–1; 4-2 pen	NH Ostrava
V. Meziříčí	0–3	SK Hranice
Kravaře	2–0	Dol. Benešov
Muglinov	1–6	Krnov
Nový Jičín	0–1	Vítkovice
B.Albrechtice	1–1; 3-5 pen	Třinec
Vratimov	4–2	Frýdek/Místek

== Round 2 ==
Team 1	Score	Team 2
Klatovy	0–2	Sparta Prague
Slavičín	0–3	Mysločovice
Vratimov	1–5	Karviná
SK Hranice	2–4	Vítkovice
Admira/Slavoj	3–2	Viktoria Žižkov
ČZU Praha	1–2	Neratovice
Sparta Brno	0–9	Boby Brno
Kyjov	0–2	Zlín
M.Albrechtice	1–3	SFC Opava
Znojmo	0–6	LeRK Prostějov
Český Dub	2–5	Jablonec
Kauč. Kralupy	1–1; 3-5 pen	Chomutov
Přeštice	1–3	Viktoria Plzeň
Sparta Krč	2–2; 4-1 pen	Bohemians
Choceň	1–3	Sigma Olomouc
Kunovice	1–0	Staré Město
Kravaře	1–3	Baník Ostrava
Ratíškovice	3–2	Poštorná
Prachatice	0–0; 3-4 pen	Dukla Příbram
SK Chrudim	0–0; 2-4 pen	České Budějovice
Neštěmice	2–5	Liberec
Rychnov	2–2; 3-5 pen	Česká Lípa
Mladá Boleslav	3–0	Hradec Králové
Krnov	0–1	Třinec
Jihlava	0–3	Petra Drnovice
Holice u Ol.	1–4	Přerov
Libočany	1–8	FK Teplice
Říčany	0–3	Bohdaneč
1. FC Plzeň	0–4	Blšany
Tachov	0–3	Most
Sl. Pardubice	0–6	Slavia Prague
Střížkov	5–0	Olympia Hradec Králové

== Round 3 ==
Team 1	Score	Team 2
Mysločovice	0–8	Sparta Prague
Vítkovice	3–1	Karviná
Admira/Slavoj	1–1; 4-2 pen	Neratovice
Zlín	1–2	Boby Brno
LeRK Prostějov	0–0; 4-5 pen	SFC Opava
Chomutov	1–3	Jablonec
Sparta Krč	1–1; 6-5 pen	Viktoria Plzeň
Kunovice	0–1	Sigma Olomouc
Ratíškovice	2–2; 5-6 pen	Baník Ostrava
České Budějovice	2–1	Dukla Příbram
Česká Lípa	0–1	Liberec
Mladá Boleslav	4–0	Třinec
Přerov	1–3	Petra Drnovice
Bohdaneč	0–0; 3-4 pen	FK Teplice
Most	1–1; 5-4 pen	Blšany
Střížkov	0–2	Slavia Prague

== Round 4 ==
The fourth round was played on 10 and 17 March 1999.

Team 1	Score	Team 2
Vítkovice	1–1; 3-4 pen	Sparta Prague
Admira/Slavoj	1–3	Boby Brno
SFC Opava	2–2; 4-3 pen	Jablonec
Sparta Krč	0–4	Sigma Olomouc
České Budějovice	1–2	Baník Ostrava
Mladá Boleslav	1–2	Liberec
Petra Drnovice	2–1	FK Teplice
Most	0–2	Slavia Prague

== Quarterfinals ==
The quarterfinals were played on 14 April 1999.

Team 1	Score	Team 2
Sparta Prague	1–0	Boby Brno
Slavia Prague	2–2; 3-0 pen	Baník Ostrava
Petra Drnovice	1–0	Sigma Olomouc
SFC Opava	0–1	Liberec

== Semifinals ==
The semifinals were played on 4 and 6 May 1999.

Team 1	Score	Team 2
Petra Drnovice	1–4	Liberec
Sparta Prague	0–1	Slavia Prague

== Final ==
25 May 1999
16:45 CEST

Slavia Prague	1–0 (a.e.t./g.g.)	Slovan Liberec
Horváth 97'

Stadion Evžena Rošického, Prague
Attendance: 4,963
Referee: Miroslav Liba

== See also ==
- 1998–99 Czech First League
- 1998–99 Czech 2. Liga
