= 2003–04 Czech Cup =

Pohár ČMFS

Tournament details
- Country: Czech Republic
- Teams: 124

Final positions
- Champions: Sparta Prague
- Runners-up: Baník Ostrava

The 2003–04 Czech Cup was the 11th edition of the annual football knockout tournament organized by the Czech Football Association of the Czech Republic.

AC Sparta Prague prevailed in Stadion Evžena Rošického, Prague at the 18 May 2004 Cup defeating FC Baník Ostrava, 2–1. 6,985 in attendance

== Teams ==
Round	Clubs remaining	Clubs involved	Winners from previous round	New entries this round	Leagues entering at this round
Preliminary round	124	24	none	24	Levels 4 and 5 in football league pyramid
First round	112	96	12	84	Czech 2. Liga; Bohemian Football League; Moravian-Silesian Football League; Czech Fourth Division
Second round	64	64	48	16	Czech First League
Third round	32	32	32	none	none
Fourth round	16	16	16	none	none
Quarter finals	8	8	8	none	none
Semi finals	4	4	4	none	none
Final	2	2	2	none	none

== Preliminary round ==
Team 1	Score	Team 2
Stříbrná Skalice	1–1; 5-4 pen	Loko Prague
Trstěnice	3–0 w/o	Union Cheb
Nový Bydžov	4–2	Předměřice
Stolany	w/o	Loko Pardubice
Rumburk	3–1	Nový Bor
Pěnčín	1–1; 3-5 pen	Český Dub
Bystřice nad Pernštejnem	0–5	Lipová
Vacenovice	1–2	Břeclav
Uherský Brod	4–1	Brumov
Bludov	6–2	Velké Losiny
Velké Karlovice	7–1	Valašské Meziříčí
Vítkovická nemocnice	3–2	Orlová

== Round 1 ==
Team 1	Score	Team 2
Stříbrná Skalice	0–2	Benešov
Ovčáry	1–0	Roudnice nad Labem
Kryry	3-7	Ústí nad Labem
Litvínov	1–2	Varnsdorf
Karlovy Vary/Dvory	2–2; 4-5 pen	Chomutov
Kadaň	0–4	Most
Trstěnice	1–3	Rakovník
Chanovice	0–3	Prachatice
Kamenný Újezd	0–3	Tábor
Třeboň	3–1	Sezimovo Ústí
Vejprnice	1–1; 2-4 pen	Strakonice
Klatovy	1–3	Střížkov
Hořovice	1–6	Bohemians Prague
Doubravka	1–3	Kladno
Týniště nad Orlicí	1–6	Hradec Králové
Nový Bydžov	0–2	Náchod
Loko Pardubice	1–1; 4-2 pen	Semily
Choceň	3–1	Letohrad
Ústí nad Orlicí	1–3	AS Pardubice
Rumburk	1–4	Velim
Český Dub	4–2	Admira/Slavoj
Vyšehrad	0–1	Kolín
Dobrovice	0–6	Mladá Boleslav
Libuš	0–2	Sparta Krč
Čelákovice	2–1	Břevnov
Ždírec	1–0	Chrudim
Sibřina	0–3	Xaverov H. Počernice
Lipová	0–2	Vysočina Jihlava
Třebíč	1–0	Znojmo
Břeclav	2–2; 4-5 pen	Dolní Kounice
Dosta Bystrc	2–0	Poštorná
Mutěnice	4–1	Kyjov
Vyškov	0–0; 5-4 pen	Kroměříž
Slavičín	3–4	Kunovice
Morkovice	1–4	1.FKD
Uherský Brod	3–0	Bystřice pod Hostýnem
Hulín	2–1	Lipník
Velké Karlovice	1–0	SK Hranice
Králová	0–5	Uničov
Bludov	1–3	Zábřeh
Horka	0–5	Prostějov
Vítkovická nemoc.	w/o	Dolní Benešov
Mokré Lazce	3–0	Hlučín
Dětmarovice	0–2	Vítkovice
Město Albrechtice	3–0	Rýmařov
1.Valašský FC	0–4	HFK Olomouc
Baník Albrechtice	2–0	Třinec
Český Těšín	2–0	Frýdek-Místek

== Round 2 ==
Team 1	Score	Team 2
Střížkov	0–1	Sparta Prague
Tábor	2–1	Benešov
Mokré Lazce	0–3	Opava
Město Albrechtice	0–5	Vítkovice
Baník Albrechtice	0–3	Baník Ostrava
Český Těšín	0–4	Dolní Benešov
Loko Pardubice	0–6	Jablonec
Ovčáry	0–0; 3-5 pen	Varnsdorf
Mutěnice	1–9	1.FC Brno
Třebíč	1–0	Dosta Bystrc
Vyškov	2–3	FC Synot
Dolní Kounice	1–3	1.FKD
Strakonice	0–0; 5-4 pen	České Budějovice
Prostějov	0–3	HFK Olomouc
Český Dub	2–5	Slovan Liberec
Mladá Boleslav	0–1	Hradec Králové
Velim	1–3	Viktoria Žižkov
Choceň	0–0; 4-2 pen	AS Pardubice
Sparta Krč	0–2	Chmel Blšany
Čelákovice	3–3; 2-4 pen	Xaverov H. Počernice
Velké Karlovice	0–2	Tescoma Zlín
Uherský Brod	2–0	Kunovice
Kladno	0–0; 3-4 pen	Marila Příbram
Rakovník	2–4	Chomutov
Most	0–0; 6-7 pen	Teplice
Ústí nad Labem	4–0	Kolín
Hulín	1–9	Sigma Olomouc
Zábřeh	1–2	Uničov
Prachatice	1–3	Viktoria Plzeň
Třeboň	0–1	Bohemians Prague
Ždírec	0–6	Vysočina Jihlava
Náchod	0–0; 7-8 pen	Slavia Prague

== Round 3 ==
Team 1	Score	Team 2
Tábor	0–5	Sparta Prague
Vítkovice	0–2	Opava
Dolní Benešov	1–1; 7-8 pen	Baník Ostrava
Varnsdorf	1–1; 2-4 pen	Jablonec
Třebíč	0–4	1.FC Brno
1.FKD	2–1	FC Synot
Strakonice	0–0; 3-2 pen	HFK Olomouc
Hradec Králové	0–4	Slovan Liberec
Choceň	2–2; 5-4 pen	Viktoria Žižkov
Xaverov H. Počernice	0–4	Chmel Blšany
Uherský Brod	0–8	Tescoma Zlín
Chomutov	0–2	Marila Příbram
Ústí nad Labem	1–1; 0-3 pen	Teplice
Uničov	2–1	Sigma Olomouc
Bohemians Prague	0–0; 6-7 pen	Viktoria Plzeň
Vysočina Jihlava	1–0	Slavia Prague

== Round 4 ==
Team 1	Score	Team 2
Sparta Prague	2–0	Opava
1.FKD	0–2	1.FC Brno
Strakonice	0–2	Slovan Liberec
Choceň	0–2	Chmel Blšany
Marila Příbram	2–0	Tescoma Zlín
Uničov	1–2	FK Teplice
Baník Ostrava	1–0	Jablonec
Vysočina Jihlava	2–1	Viktoria Plzeň

== Quarterfinals ==
Team 1	Score	Team 2
Slovan Liberec	2–0	Chmel Blšany
Baník Ostrava	1–0	1.FC Brno
Vysočina Jihlava	1–0	FK Teplice
Marila Příbram	1–3	Sparta Prague

== Semifinals ==
Team 1	Score	Team 2
Baník Ostrava	2–1	Vysočina Jihlava
Sparta Prague	1–0	Slovan Liberec

== Final ==
18 May 2004
16:25 CEST

AC Sparta Prague	2–1	FC Baník Ostrava
Rezek 51'; Johana 84'		56' Lička

Stadion Evžena Rošického, Prague
Attendance: 6,985
Referee: Karel Vidlák

== See also ==
- 2003–04 Czech First League
- 2003–04 Czech 2. Liga
