= Lubomír Myšák =

Czech footballer

Personal information
- Date of birth: 2 September 1979 (age 47)
- Place of birth: Czechoslovakia
- Height: 1.85 m (6 ft 1 in)
- Position: Forward

Youth career
- Choceň
- SK Hradec Králové

Senior career*
Years	Team	Apps	(Gls)
2000–2001	FK OEZ Letohrad		
2001–2004	SC Xaverov		
2003	→ Blšany (loan)	5	(1)
2004–2005	České Budějovice	22	(0)
2005	→ Prachatice (loan)		

International career
1994	Czech Republic U15	2	(0)
- * Club domestic league appearances and goals

Lubomír Myšák (born 2 September 1979) is a Czech former football player. While playing for SC Xaverov, he was among the Czech 2. Liga top scorers in the 2001–02 and 2002–03 seasons. He made 27 appearances in the Czech First League, scoring once.

== Early career ==
Myšák started playing football in Choceň before moving to SK Hradec Králové. He then played in the Fourth Division with FK OEZ Letohrad in Eastern Bohemia. There he was the league top scorer in Division C with 24 goals in the 2000–01 season. He subsequently signed a three-year contract with SC Xaverov of the Czech 2. Liga.

At Xaverov, Myšák started poorly, scoring just twice in the first half of the 2001–02 Czech 2. Liga. After the winter break, Myšák scored eight goals in the first three games of the spring part of the season, including four in one match against 1. HFK Olomouc. He finished the season as second highest scorer in the league, with 15 goals.

== Czech First League and beyond ==
After having scored 25 goals in two seasons for Xaverov, Myšák headed to Blšany in 2003 on a six-month loan to play in the Czech First League. He returned to Xaverov, scoring two goals that season, but the club was relegated at the end of the 2003–04 Czech 2. Liga.

In the summer of 2004, Myšák joined České Budějovice. He played there for over a season, although despite playing 22 matches he failed to score. This prompted him to go on loan to Prachatice in September 2005. By the autumn of 2006, Myšák was playing in the Bohemian Football League for České Budějovice's "B" team. In 2007, he spent some time on trial at Dosta Bystrc, who were playing in the 2. Liga. He last played with FK OEZ Letohrad.
