= 2001–02 Czech 2. Liga =

2. česká fotbalová liga
- Season: 2001–02
- Champions: České Budějovice
- Promoted: České Budějovice; Zlín
- Relegated: Ratíškovice; Kolín
- Matches played: 240
- Goals scored: 620 (2.58 per match)
- Top goalscorer: Radek Drulák (16)
- Average attendance: 1,047

The 2001–02 Czech 2. Liga was the ninth season of the 2. česká fotbalová liga, the second tier of the Czech football league.

== League standings ==
Pos	Team	Pld	W	D	L	GF	GA	GD	Pts	Promotion or relegation
1	České Budějovice (C, P)	30	20	6	4	58	20	+38	66	Promotion to 2002–03 1. Liga
2	Zlín (P)	30	18	10	2	56	24	+32	64	Promotion to 2002–03 1. Liga
3	Mladá Boleslav	30	15	7	8	40	29	+11	52	
4	Viktoria Plzeň	30	15	5	10	56	34	+22	50	
5	Pardubice	30	12	10	8	39	30	+9	46	
6	Xaverov	30	13	7	10	44	36	+8	46	
7	Jihlava	30	12	6	12	47	46	+1	42	
8	Vítkovice	30	9	13	8	38	38	0	40	
9	Most	30	9	9	12	36	37	−1	36	
10	Prostějov	30	8	12	10	33	34	−1	36	
11	HFK Olomouc	30	9	8	13	34	41	−7	35	
12	Sigma Olomouc B	30	9	8	13	33	53	−20	35	
13	Chomutov	30	9	7	14	30	50	−20	34	
14	Spolana Neratovice	30	7	9	14	32	39	−7	30	
15	Ratíškovice (R)	30	7	3	20	21	53	−32	24	Relegation to 2002–03 MSFL
16	Kolín (R)	30	5	6	19	22	55	−33	21	Relegation to 2002–03 ČFL

Source: The Football Association of the Czech Republic
Rules for classification: 1) points; 2) goal difference; 3) number of goals scored.
(C) Champions; (P) Promoted; (R) Relegated

== Top goalscorers ==
Rank	Scorer	Club	Goals
1	(Czech Republic) Radek Drulák	HFK Olomouc	16
2	(Czech Republic) Lubomír Myšák	Xaverov	15

== See also ==
- 2001–02 Czech First League
- 2001–02 Czech Cup
