= Buček =

Buček is a surname. Notable people with the surname include:

- Antonín Buček (born 1984), Czech footballer
- Juraj Buček (born 1973), Slovak footballer
- Martin Buček (born 1986), Czech ice hockey player

== See also ==
- Addy Bucek (born 1960), Australian sailor
