= Pěnička =

Pěnička (feminine Pěničková) is a Czech surname. Notable people with the surname include:

- Annika Penickova (born 2009), American tennis player
- Blanka Pěničková (born 1980), Czech footballer
- Martin Pěnička (1969–2023), Czech footballer, brother of Pavel
- Kristina Penickova (born 2009), American tennis player
- Pavel Pěnička (born 1967), Czech footballer, brother of Martin
