= International Christian Academy (Ivory Coast) =

Was an American boarding school in Bouaké

Coordinates: 7°41.7′N 4°58.3′W

Location
- Bouaké; Ivory Coast

Information
- Former name: Ivory Coast Academy
- School type: Boarding School
- Religious affiliation(s): Conservative Baptist Foreign Mission Society
- Established: 1962
- Closed: 2005

International Christian Academy (ICA) was an American boarding school in Bouaké, Ivory Coast.

== History ==
It was established in 1962 as Ivory Coast Academy by the Conservative Baptist Foreign Mission Society (now Venture Church Network) and its main purpose was to provide a standard American education to the children of missionaries in West Africa. In 2002, it had some 160+ students from 13 nations in grades 1–12.

In September 2002, during the Ivorian Civil War, children were trapped at the school for a week by fighting between government soldiers and rebels opposed to President Laurent Gbagbo. Eventually they were evacuated unharmed by French troops to government held Yamoussoukro. Some of the students and staff then relocated to Dakar Academy in Senegal in order to complete the school year. The ICA campus in eastern Bouaké was then used as a French military base in rebel-held Côte d'Ivoire.

ICA was accredited by the Association of Christian Schools International and the Middle States Association of Colleges and Schools.

In February 2005, the ICA School Board formally closed the school with no prospects of reopening.

The ICA campus is presently known as Village Baptiste. The campus is administered by The Association of Evangelical Baptist Churches of Côte d'Ivoire (AEBECI). A portion of the campus has been rented to the medical branch of the local university. Journey Corps, a branch of Mission Baptiste has its base on the campus. There is also a church meeting in what was previously the ICA chapel. A Bible study for medical students and other resident occurs weekly. The houses and dormitories are full and much activity occurs daily.

== See also ==
- Christianity in Ivory Coast
- Education in Ivory Coast
