= 1999–2000 Czech 2. Liga =

2. česká fotbalová liga
- Season: 1999–2000
- Champions: Synot
- Promoted: Synot; Plzeň
- Relegated: Poštorná; Frýdek-Místek
- Matches played: 240
- Goals scored: 651 (2.71 per match)
- Top goalscorer: Vladimír Malár (24)
- Average attendance: 1,305

The 1999–2000 Czech 2. Liga was the seventh season of the 2. česká fotbalová liga, the second tier of the Czech football league. Eventual winners, FC Synot clinched promotion to the Czech First League five matches before the end of the season.

== League standings ==
Pos	Team	Pld	W	D	L	GF	GA	GD	Pts	Promotion or relegation
1	Synot (C, P)	30	24	4	2	76	29	+47	76	Promotion to 2000–01 1. Liga
2	Viktoria Plzeň (P)	30	17	8	5	50	22	+28	59	Promotion to 2000–01 1. Liga
3	Ratíškovice	30	14	9	7	48	33	+15	51	
4	Most	30	10	15	5	43	32	+11	45	
5	NH Ostrava (R)	30	11	10	9	46	39	+7	43	
6	Lázně Bohdaneč	30	11	10	9	36	33	+3	43	
7	Neratovice	30	12	6	12	42	45	−3	42	
8	Zlín	30	10	11	9	44	33	+11	41	
9	Xaverov	30	10	7	13	34	41	−7	37	
10	Třinec	30	9	10	11	39	60	−21	37	
11	Karviná	30	8	9	13	44	48	−4	33	
12	Prostějov	30	8	9	13	39	47	−8	33	
13	Mladá Boleslav	30	7	12	11	31	40	−9	33	
14	Vítkovice	30	7	12	11	23	38	−15	33	
15	Poštorná (R)	30	5	10	15	30	47	−17	25	Relegation to 2000–01 MSFL
16	Frýdek-Místek (R)	30	4	4	22	26	64	−38	16	Relegation to 2000–01 MSFL

Source: RSSSF
Rules for classification: 1) points; 2) goal difference; 3) number of goals scored.
(C) Champions; (P) Promoted; (R) Relegated

== Top goalscorers ==
Rank	Scorer	Club	Goals
1	(Czech Republic) Vladimír Malár	Synot	24
2	(Czech Republic) Karel Kulyk	Ratíškovice	16
3	(Czech Republic) Vladimír Chalupa	NH Ostrava	12

== See also ==
- 1999–2000 Czech First League
- 1999–2000 Czech Cup
