= Pavel Pěnička =

Czech footballer (born 1967)

Personal information
- Date of birth: 5 February 1967 (age 58)
- Place of birth: Liberec, Czechoslovakia
- Height: 1.82 m (6 ft 0 in)
- Position(s): Defender

Senior career*
Years	Team	Apps	(Gls)
1986	TJ Slovan Elitex Liberec		
1986–1988	FK Tábor		
1988–1989	FC Slovan Liberec		
1993–1994	SK České Budějovice JČE	27	(4)
1994–1999	FK Jablonec	141	(19)
1999–2001	SK České Budějovice	39	(2)
2001–2002	FC Lausitz Hoyerswerda		
2002–2003	PFC Český Dub		
- *Club domestic league appearances and goals

Pavel Pěnička (born 5 February 1967) is a retired Czech football defender. He made over 200 appearances in the Gambrinus liga, featuring for clubs including SK České Budějovice and FK Jablonec. He is the brother of footballer Martin Pěnička.
