= International Community School of Abidjan =

School in Abidjan, Ivory Coast

Location
- Off Boulevard Arsène Usher Assouan Road, Riveria III, Abidjan, Côte d'Ivoire
- 5.3517°N 3.9515091000000666°W

Information
- Website: icsabidjan.org

International Community School of Abidjan (ICSA) is an English-speaking international school in Riviera III, Abidjan, Ivory Coast.

This school serves levels Kindergarten through Grade 12. The International Community School of Abidjan Association operates the school, while the U.S. Embassy in Côte d'Ivoire sponsors it and the U.S. State Department Office of Overseas Schools provides support. The Middle States Association and the Council of International Schools accredit the school.

== History ==
Several Americans, all of whom related in some way to the U.S. Embassy, established the school in 1972, initially with 12 students. The school moved into its current campus in 1989. Both the First Ivorian Civil War of 2002–2007 and the Second Ivorian Civil War of 2010–2011 disrupted the school and caused its student population to decline. The school occupied a temporary campus near M’Pouto in 2005, during the course of the first war. After each war ended, the student body recovered.

== See also ==
- Education in Ivory Coast
- Ivory Coast–United States relations
- List of international schools
