= Zapalac =

Zapalac is a Czech surname. Notable people with the surname include:

- Bill Zapalac (born 1948), American football player
- Petr Zapalač (born 1987), Czech footballer
- Willie Zapalac (1920–2010), American football coach
