= Luboš Hruška =

Czech footballer (born 1987)

Personal information
- Full name: Luboš Hruška
- Date of birth: 21 July 1987 (age 39)
- Place of birth: Czechoslovakia
- Height: 1.96 m (6 ft 5 in)
- Position: Centre back

Team information
- Current team: Uhelné sklady Prague

Senior career*
Years	Team	Apps	(Gls)
–2008	FK Chlumec nad Cidlinou		
2008–2010	Viktoria Žižkov	11	(0)
2010–2013	Zemplín Michalovce	30	(1)
2013–2014	Baník Sokolov	17	(0)
2014–2015	Bohemians Prague (Střížkov)		
2015–2016	Dobrovice		
2016–2018	Viktorie Jirny		
2018–	Uhelné sklady Prague		
- * Club domestic league appearances and goals as of 30 May 2011

Luboš Hruška (born 21 July 1987) is a Czech football defender who plays for Uhelné sklady Prague. He has played top-level football for Viktoria Žižkov in the Gambrinus liga.
