= Lamine Fall =

Senegalese footballer

Personal information
- Date of birth: 10 July 1992 (age 34)
- Place of birth: Dakar, Senegal
- Height: 1.85 m (6 ft 1 in)
- Position: Midfielder

Team information
- Current team: FC Zbrojovka Brno

Youth career
- –2009: Dakar Academy
- 2009–2010: FK ŠVS Bradlan Brezová pod Bradlom
- 2010–2011: FC Zbrojovka Brno

Senior career*
Years	Team	Apps	(Gls)
2011–2016	FC Zbrojovka Brno	24	(1)
2014	→ Žďár nad Sázavou (loan)	14	(1)
2014–2015	→ Most (loan)	10	(0)
2015	→ Třebíč (loan)	16	(3)
2016–2021	SK Líšeň	107	(6)
- * Club domestic league appearances and goals as of 5 February 2021

Lamine Fall (born 10 July 1992 in Dakar) is a Senegalese footballer who last played for SK Líšeň.

== Club career ==
At the age of sixteen, he moved to Europe. His first club was the Slovak team Bradlan Brezová. He played in FC Zbrojovka Brno for 5 years, then moved to SK Líšeň. During his engagement in Líšeň, he worked for the club as a stadium manager.
