= Lloyd Sam =

Ghanaian-English footballer (born 1984)

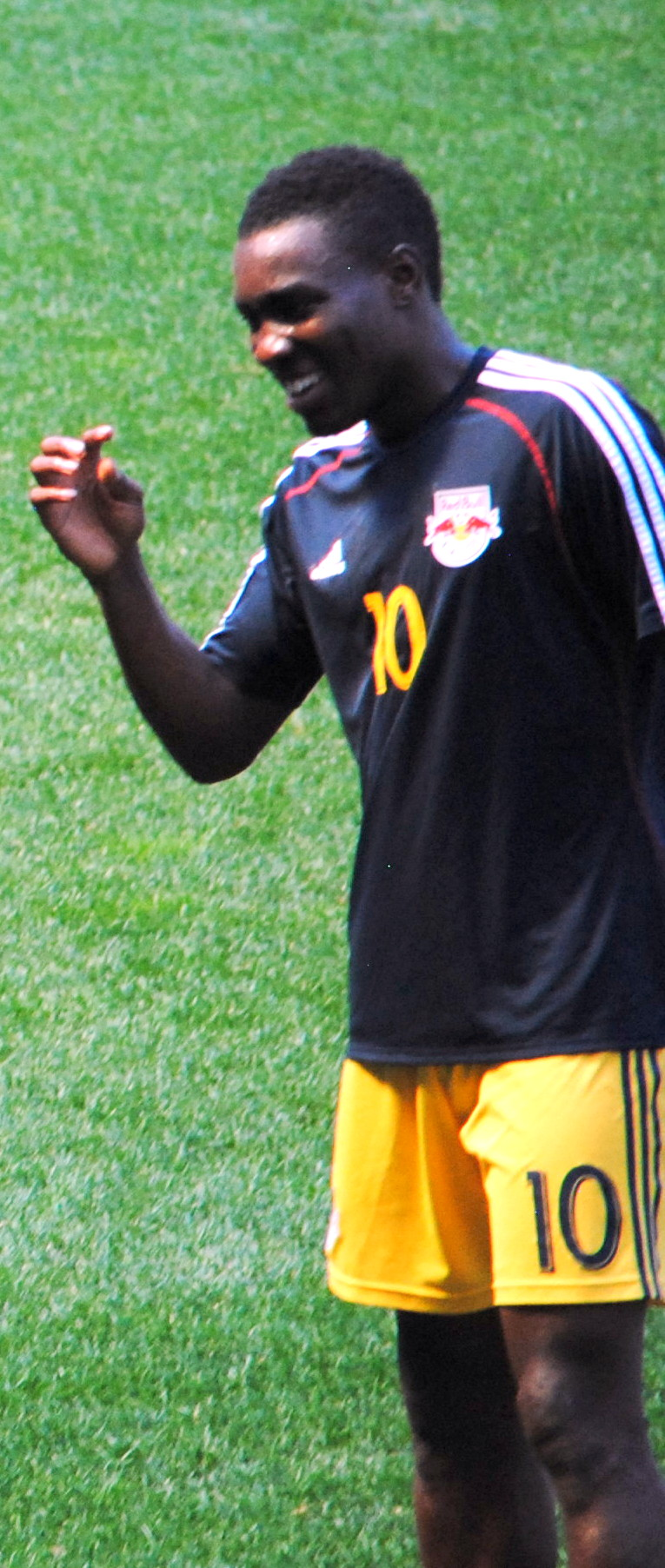
- Sam in 2014

Personal information
- Full name: Lloyd Ekow Sam
- Date of birth: 27 September 1984 (age 42)
- Place of birth: Leeds, England
- Height: 5 ft 8 in (1.73 m)
- Position: Winger

Youth career
- Charlton Athletic

Senior career*
Years	Team	Apps	(Gls)
2003–2010	Charlton Athletic	119	(6)
2004	→ Leyton Orient (loan)	10	(0)
2006	→ Sheffield Wednesday (loan)	4	(0)
2007	→ Southend United (loan)	2	(0)
2010–2012	Leeds United	35	(2)
2012	→ Notts County (loan)	10	(5)
2012–2016	New York Red Bulls	106	(20)
2016–2017	D.C. United	43	(5)
2018	AFC Wimbledon	2	(0)
2019–2020	Miami FC	25	(2)
Total		356	(40)

International career
2005	England U20	1	(1)
2015	Ghana	1	(0)
- * Club domestic league appearances and goals

Lloyd Ekow Sam (born 27 September 1984) is a former footballer who played as a winger. Since 2023, he has been a match analyst for MLS Season Pass on Apple TV. He previously served as the color commentator for MLS club Charlotte FC. As a player, he was comfortable playing on either side of the pitch. Born in England to Ghanaian parents, Sam represented England internationally once at U20 level; however, he represented Ghana at the senior level.

== Club career ==
=== Early career ===
Sam was born in Leeds, but his family moved to London when he was two months old. Sam began his football career at Charlton Athletic but spent a portion of his childhood living in Senegal where he attended Dakar Academy. In 1998, Sam was asked to attend a trial at Italian side Empoli, with his older brother Andrew. However, neither was successful. When Sam's family returned to London in 1998, he was offered trials at both Wimbledon and Arsenal, but instead re-joined Charlton on Academy terms.

=== Charlton Athletic ===
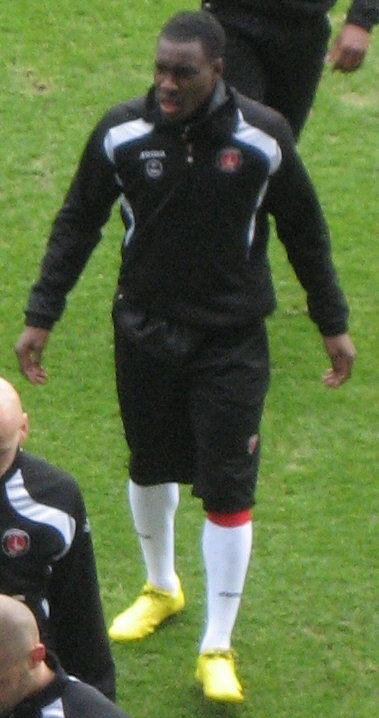
Sam training with Charlton Athletic in 2010

Sam became a professional in 2003, at the age of 18. His first involvement in a Charlton squad came after the Charlton youth team beat Leeds United. His and Osei Sankofa's impressive form for the youth side resulted in a call up to the first team squad against Arsenal, but it was two years before he made his debut for Charlton against Crystal Palace on the final day of the 2004–05 season. Before this, he spent time on loan with Leyton Orient in the Third Division. He later had loan spells with Sheffield Wednesday and Southend United in the Championship.

After Charlton were relegated from the Premier League following the 2007–08 season, Sam received an opportunity to break into Charlton's first team. He was assigned the number 18 shirt. He started the season well, scoring his first ever goals against Stockport County in the League cup and Coventry City but was sent off in October 2007 following a clash with Ian Ashbee of Hull City. Sam and Charlton narrowly missed out on promotion back to the Premier League, after poor end of season form saw them drop out of the play-off positions to 11th place.

Sam suffered relegation with Charlton from The Championship to League One during the 2008–09 season. This was his second relegation with Charlton, having played a minor part in the squad that was relegated from the Premier League in 2006–07.

He narrowly missed out on promotion the following season, when Charlton reached the League One playoff semi-finals, but ended up losing against Swindon Town.

Sam was not offered a new contract by Charlton after they failed to gain an immediate return to the Championship, as they could not afford his wages, which had been set during their final Premier League season in 2006–07 under Iain Dowie.

=== Leeds United ===
Sam signed a two-year deal with his hometown club Leeds United on 9 July 2010 on a free transfer from Charlton Athletic. Leeds had finished the 2009–10 season two points ahead of Charlton, and had gained automatic promotion from League One, as runners up. The contract came with an option to extend it further than the initial two years. He made his Leeds debut in the first game of the season against Derby County on 7 August 2010 which ended in a 2–1 defeat, with Sam conceding a penalty on his debut after fouling Tomasz Cywka.

Sam scored his first goal for Leeds in his second appearance, the goal came in the League Cup against Lincoln City. He scored his first league goal in the following match against Nottingham Forest, he also received the man of the match award for his performance. On 21 August 2010 he struck his second league goal and his third goal in all competitions for his new club against Millwall, cancelling out Richard Naylor's early own goal.

After being an ever-present for Leeds, Sam sustained a minor foot injury, was dropped for the game against Swansea City on 11 September and replaced in the starting lineup by Max Gradel. Sam came on in the same game as a second-half substitute for Sanchez Watt. Sam came back into the starting lineup for the following game against Barnsley. After being an unused substitute vs Doncaster, Sam returned to the starting lineup against Sheffield United. However, Sam suffered an ankle injury and was ruled out of a few games for Leeds. Sam returned to a Leeds squad when he was named on the bench against Coventry City. Sam made his playing return as a second-half substitute against Hull City. Sam came on as a second-half substitute against Bristol City, had an impressive impact and helped assist one of Luciano Becchio's goals after David James parried Sam's shot. Sam again made an impressive impact as a substitute against Crystal Palace helping Leeds earn a 2–1 win. Sam came on as a substitute against Cardiff City, but picked up a thigh injury 6 minutes after coming on and had to be substituted himself. Sam was involved in some controversy against Hull City, when he accidentally collided with Liam Rosenior who suffered a neck injury. Hull manager Nigel Pearson called Sam a coward, but Sam claimed the incident was accidental. Rosenior also accepted Sam's apology. After a positive start for Leeds, Sam's season was disrupted after picking up various injuries during the course of the season, which ruled him out for large periods.

After an injury hit 2010–11 season, Sam revealed he had been doing extra work in the gym over the summer period to help strengthen his leg. After providing several assists in the pre season matches, Sam topped off a fine pre-season with a goal against Newcastle United. Sam came on as a substitute for Leeds the opening day of the season as they suffered a 3–1 defeat against Southampton. He made his first start of the season in Leeds' 3–2 win over rivals Bradford City in the League Cup. Sam made his first appearance in over a month after coming on a substitute against Peterborough United on 22 October.

On 14 March 2012, Sam went to Notts County on loan until the end of the season. On 9 April he scored a hat-trick as Notts County beat Yeovil Town, 3–1. After his two-year deal came to an end, Sam was told by Neil Warnock his contract wouldn't be renewed at the end of the 2011–12 season and that he would be released from the club at the expiry of his contract. After leaving Leeds, Sam had trials with Portsmouth and New York Red Bulls.

=== New York Red Bulls ===
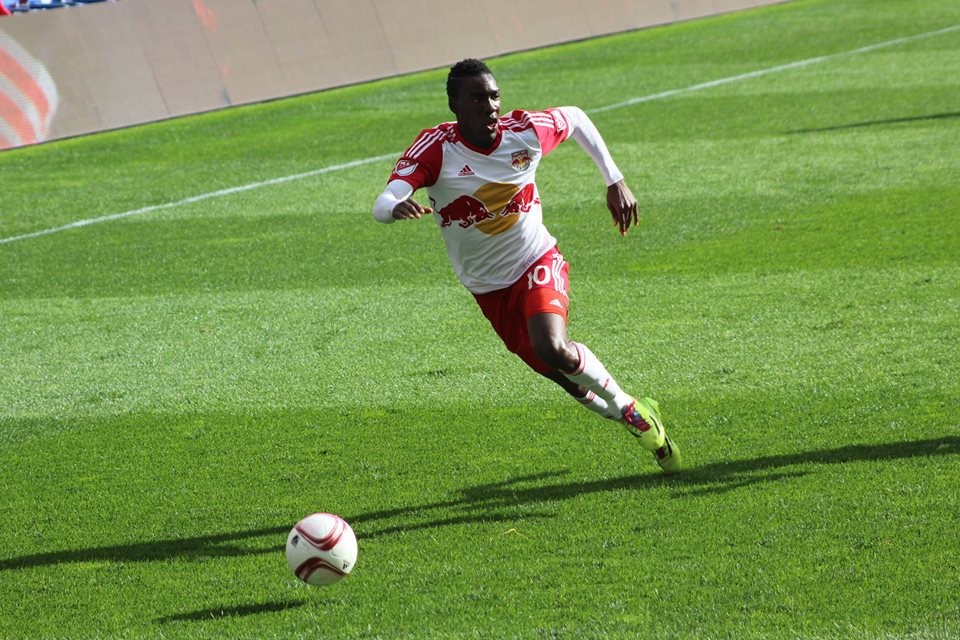
Sam playing for New York Red Bulls in 2015

On 16 August 2012 Sam officially joined the New York Red Bulls of Major League Soccer. Sam appeared in five league matches for the club showing impressive form before being sidelined for the rest of the season with a knee injury. Sam was named MLS Player of the Week for his performance on 3 August 2013. During the match Sam had an assist and the game-winning goal in a 3–2 victory over Sporting Kansas City. On the final day of the season Sam scored New York's third goal in a 5–2 victory over Chicago Fire which gave the club its first title the 2013 Supporters' Shield. During the 2014 season Sam cemented his starting position for New York as he started 32 league matches for the club scoring 4 goals and assisting on 9 others.

Sam started the 2015 season in fine form on 8 March 2015 scoring in 1–1 draw at Sporting Kansas City, a goal that earned him goal of the week nomination. On 22 March 2015 Sam scored his second goal of the season in a 2–0 victory over rival D.C. United at Red Bull Arena. On 11 April 2015 Sam scored his third goal of the season for New York, a last minute equalizer in a 2–2 draw against D.C. United, a match in which the team was trailing by two goals. On 11 July 2015 Sam helped New York to a 4–1 victory over New England Revolution scoring one goal and assisting on another. On 30 August, Sam scored the opening goal of the match for New York in a 3–0 victory over rivals D.C. United. On 7 October, Sam scored his tenth league goal of the season for New York to help the Red Bulls to a 2–1 victory over Montreal Impact.

On 29 April 2016, Sam scored his first goal of the season for New York in a 4–0 victory against FC Dallas.

=== D.C. United ===
Sam was traded to rival club D.C. United in exchange for allocation money on 7 July 2016. Sam made his debut for United on 16 July 2016, in a 1–1 draw against the Columbus Crew. On 8 April 2017 Sam played his 100th MLS start and scored in the 53rd minute against New York City. Despite leading the team in key passes and assists, United declined Sam's contract option at the end of the 2017 season. He played 43 games, scored 5 goals, and assisted 12 goals for D.C. United.

=== AFC Wimbledon ===
On 22 March 2018, Sam joined AFC Wimbledon until the end of the season. He was released by AFC Wimbledon at the end of the 2017–18 season.

=== Miami FC ===
In January 2019, Sam signed with Miami FC of the National Premier Soccer League. During his first season he scored one goal, coming in a team-record 10–0 win over Storm FC on 4 May 2019, as Miami went on to win the NPSL National Championship for a second straight year.

Following the end of the NPSL season, Miami joined the newly formed third division National Independent Soccer Association. During the Fall 2019 season Miami went undefeated in NISA's East Coast Conference and Sam scored two goals including the third and final goal in the team's fall championship win over Stumptown Athletic.

Sam was confirmed to be returning to the team following Miami FC's jump to the USL Championship on 7 January 2020.

== International ==
Sam has also played for the England U20 team alongside former Leeds teammate Neil Kilkenny. He scored once for the team, against Russia in a match at his then home stadium, The Valley, in 2005.

Despite previously representing England at youth levels. In July 2010 Sam's agent claimed after the 2010 World Cup that Sam was looking to break into the Ghana national team, the country of his parents' birth.

In October 2010, Ghana officials asked the English FA to get written confirmation that Sam would be eligible to play for the Ghana national team and also get official confirmation from FIFA so that Sam's switch to Ghana could be fully confirmed. On 28 January 2011, Ghana officials revealed they were close to securing Sam's international status for Ghana. He was called up by Ghana on 10 October 2015 to play a 13 October friendly against Canada in which he was a substitute in the 53rd minute.
