= Mirko Poledica =

Serbian footballer and union leader

Personal information
- Date of birth: 11 September 1978 (age 48)
- Place of birth: Čačak, SFR Yugoslavia
- Height: 1.90 m (6 ft 3 in)
- Position: Left back

Youth career
- Borac Čačak

Senior career*
Years	Team	Apps	(Gls)
1996–2000	Borac Čačak	119	(5)
2000–2003	Vojvodina	62	(3)
2002–2003	→ Lech Poznań (loan)	14	(0)
2003–2004	Sparta Prague	22	(3)
2004–2006	Legia Warsaw	7	(1)
2005	→ Pogoń Szczecin (loan)	7	(0)
2006	Slavia Sofia	0	(0)
2007	Smederevo	14	(1)
2007	Čukarički	14	(0)
2008–2009	Borac Čačak	15	(1)
2009–2010	Mladost Lučani	5	(0)
Total		279	(14)
- * Club domestic league appearances and goals

Mirko Poledica (Serbian Cyrillic: Мирко Поледица; born 11 September 1978) is a Serbian retired professional footballer and the current President of the Syndicate of Professional Footballers in Serbia.

== Career ==
Born in Čačak, as a child he loved sports, and started playing football in his hometown club Borac Čačak when he stayed for ten years. He passed through all the youth squads under coaches such as Milovan Ćirković, Mića Kovačević and Mihailo Kolarević. The last one took him to the senior squad, making him debut against Red Star. The list of his co-players that were in the youth teams of Borac was one of the best in the club's history, and includes names like Milivoje Vitakić, Ivica Dragutinović, Branko Jelić, Neško Milovanović, among others. After four seasons in the senior team, he moved to Vojvodina where, in the 2001–02 season, he was included in the team of the season by the First League managers. In that season, he also received a call to the Serbia national team for a friendly match against Mexico, but did not get to play. For the second half of the 2002–03 season, he joined Polish club Lech Poznań loan. His performance did not go unnoticed and many clubs disputed over him, with Czech champions Sparta Prague signing Poledica in 2003. He played there for one season, helping the team to reach the last 16 in the Champions League and win the Czech Cup. Then, he returned to Polish football, this time to play for Lech's archrivals Legia Warsaw. Legia finished the 2004–05 season in 3rd, and went on to win the championship in the following 2005–06 season, with Poledica receiving very little playing time. Because of some financial issues, he left the club for a short stint with Bulgarian side Slavia Sofia, before returning to Serbia after five years abroad, signing with Smederevo where he appearaed in all of the club's fixtures until the end of the season. In the summer of 2007, Poledica moved to another Superliga club Čukarički, before returning to Borac Čačak in January 2008. In summer of 2009, he moved to the First League club Mladost Lučani where he played his last season before retiring.

On 12 March 2009, he was elected as President of the Syndicate of Professional Footballers in Serbia. and has been dedicating himself to defend the rights of all footballers throughout Serbia.

== Honours ==
Sparta Praha

- Czech Cup: 2003–04

Legia Warsaw

- Ekstraklasa: 2005–06
