= Jiří Kowalík =

Czech footballer (born 1977)

Personal information
- Date of birth: 5 September 1977 (age 49)
- Place of birth: Frýdek-Místek, Czechoslovakia
- Height: 1.77 m (5 ft 10 in)
- Position: Striker

Senior career*
Years	Team	Apps	(Gls)
1998–2003	1. FC Synot	138	(47)
2004–2006	FK Teplice	7	(0)
2004	→ 1. FC Brno (loan)	8	(0)
2006	→ Slovácko (loan)	1	(0)
2006–2007	Fotbal Fulnek	10	(2)
Total		164	(49)
- * Club domestic league appearances and goals

Jiří Kowalík (born 5 September 1977) is a Czech former professional footballer who played as a striker. He is notable for being the top scorer of the Gambrinus liga in 2002–03, scoring 16 goals for 1. FC Synot.

Kowalík's career at the top was ended when, in 2004, he tore knee ligaments while at Brno.

After some time in Slovakia, Kowalík returned to the Czech Republic in 2008 to play for FK Mutěnice in the Moravian–Silesian Football League. In 2009, he was playing lower league football at Kněžpole in the Uherské Hradiště District.
