= Antonín Buček =

Czech footballer

Personal information
- Date of birth: 24 February 1984 (age 42)
- Place of birth: Ostrava, Czechoslovakia
- Height: 1.88 m (6 ft 2 in)
- Position: Goalkeeper

Team information
- Current team: Slavia Orlová

Youth career
- 1991–1997: Baník Ostrava
- 1997–1998: NH Ostrava
- 1998–2004: Baník Ostrava

Senior career*
Years	Team	Apps	(Gls)
2004–2012	Baník Ostrava	36	(0)
2006	→ Chmel Blšany (loan)	2	(0)
2010	→ Ústí nad Labem (loan)	5	(0)
2011–2012	→ Baník Sokolov (loan)	29	(0)
2013	Akzhayik	13	(0)
2014	ROW Rybnik	16	(0)
2014–2015	GKS Katowice	13	(0)
2015	FC Hlučín	10	(0)
2015–2017	Odra Petřkovice	57	(0)
2017–2018	Frýdek-Místek	22	(0)
2018–2019	Znojmo	29	(0)
2019–2020	Odra Petřkovice	16	(0)
2020	Vitkovice	0	(0)
2020–	Slavia Orlová		

International career
2000–2001	Czech Republic U16	6	(0)
2001	Czech Republic U18	2	(0)
2002	Czech Republic U19	1	(0)
2004–2006	Czech Republic U21	2	(0)
- * Club domestic league appearances and goals as of 24 February 2024

Antonín Buček (born 24 February 1984) is a Czech footballer who plays as a goalkeeper for Slavia Orlová.

Buček played for Czech youth national teams since the under-16 level.

== Career ==
After two years, Buček returned to Odra Petřkovice for the second time.
