= Miroslav Beránek =

Czech footballer and coach (born 1957)

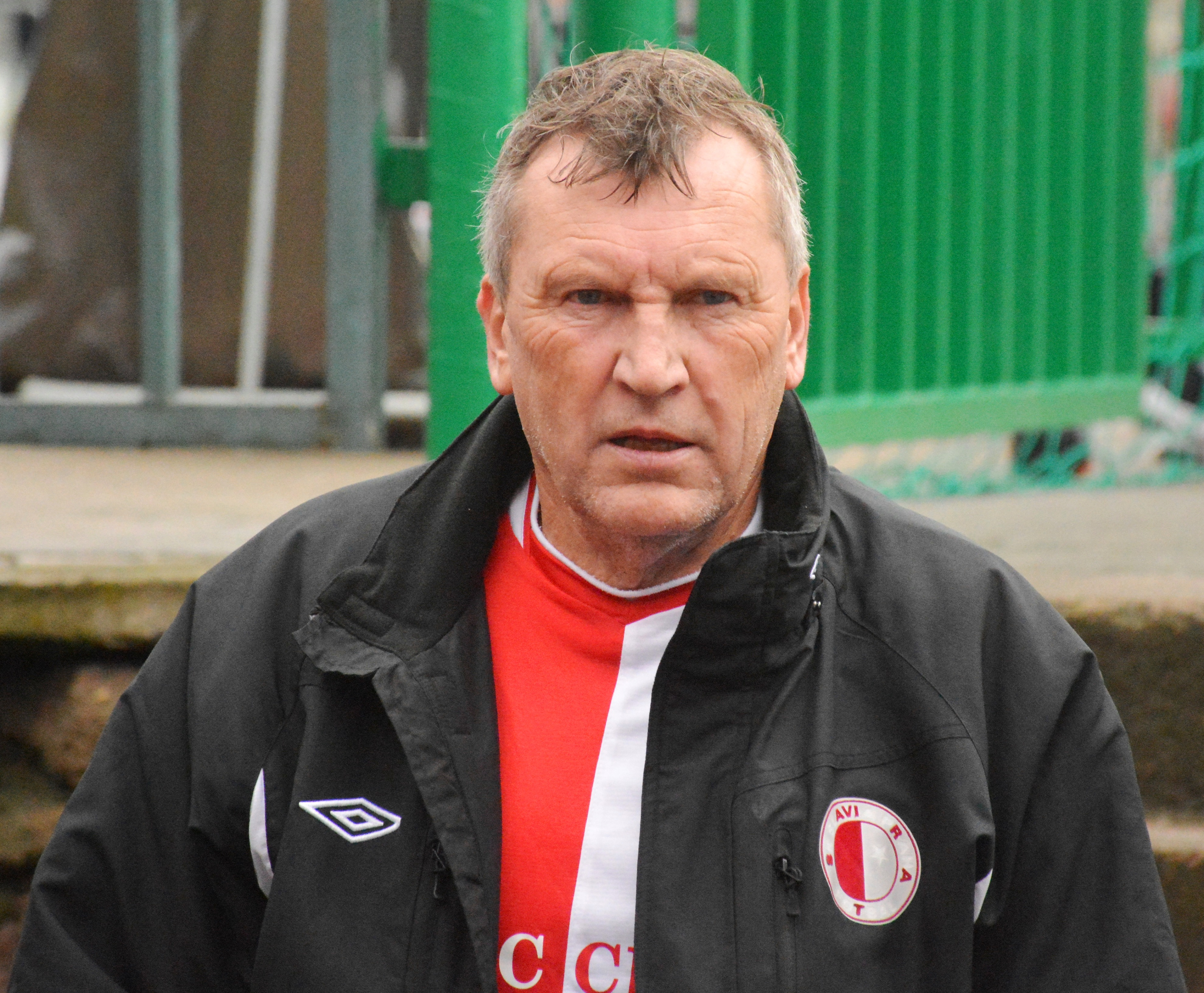
- Beránek in 2017

Personal information
- Date of birth: 24 April 1957 (age 69)
- Place of birth: Benešov, Czechoslovakia
- Position: Defender

Youth career
- 1967–1976: Tesla Votice

Senior career*
| Years | Team | Apps | (Gls) |
| 1976–1978 | VTJ Jindřichův Hradec | | |
| 1978–1983 | Spartak Pelhřimov | | |
| 1983–1984 | Škoda Plzeň | | |
| 1984–1989 | Slavia Prague | 128 | (5) |
| 1989–1991 | SV Gmünd | | |

Managerial career
- Years: Club
- 1991–1993: SV Gmünd (playing coach)
- 1993–1994: Slavia Prague (Assistant)
- 1994–1995: Slavia Prague
- 1996: SK Kladno
- 1996–2001: Chmel Blšany
- 1997–2000: Czech U-21 Team (Assistant)
- 2000–2002: Czech U-21 Team
- 2001–2003: Slavia Prague
- 2002–2006: Czech National Team (Assistant)
- 2006–2007: Debreceni VSC
- 2007–2008: Al Wasl FC
- 2008–2010: 1. FC Brno
- 2010–2011: SK Kladno
- 2011–2013: Kazakhstan
- 2012–2013: FC Astana
- 2014–2015: Slavia Prague
Medal record
Men's football
Representing Czech Republic (as manager)
UEFA European Under-21 Championship
| Winner | 2002 |
- * Club domestic league appearances and goals

Miroslav Beránek (born 24 April 1957) is a Czech football coach and former player who was most recently the manager of the Slavia Prague. As a player, he played over 100 matches as a defender for Slavia Prague in the 1980s.

== Coaching career ==
Beránek took charge of Slavia Prague in the 1994–95 season. After managing Chmel Blšany in the Czech First League, he returned for a second spell at Slavia, where he won the 2001–02 Czech Cup.

As coach of the Czech Republic U21 team, he won the 2002 UEFA European Under-21 Football Championship. He has also coached several Czech clubs and worked abroad in Hungary, the United Arab Emirates and Kazakhstan.

Beránek returned to manage Slavia in 2014 following 11 years away from the club.

== Honours ==
=== Coach ===
Chmel Blšany

- Druhá liga: 1997–98

Slavia Prague

- Czech Cup: 2001–02

Debreceni VSC

- Nemzeti Bajnokság I: 2006–07

Astana

- Kazakhstan Cup: 2012

Czech Republic U21

- UEFA European Under-21 Championship: 2002
