= Vladimír Malár =

Czech footballer

Personal information
- Date of birth: 12 February 1976 (age 50)
- Place of birth: Czechoslovakia
- Height: 1.76 m (5 ft 9 in)
- Position: Forward

Youth career
- Sokol Hrušky

Senior career*
Years	Team	Apps	(Gls)
1999	→ SK Slavia Prague (loan)	11	(4)
1999–2001	1. FC Synot	44	(10)
2002	AC Sparta Prague	7	(0)
2002–2004	1. FC Synot	47	(5)
2004	FC Zlín	16	(3)
2005–2006	1. FC Slovácko	45	(4)
2006–2007	FC Viktoria Plzeň	22	(1)
2007–2008	FC Zlín	37	(2)
Total		229	(29)
- * Club domestic league appearances and goals

Vladimír Malár (born 12 February 1976) is a Czech former football player. He played in the top flight of his country, making more than 200 top-flight appearances in the Gambrinus liga.

== Early career ==
Malár played on loan at Slavia Prague during the spring part of the 1998–99 Gambrinus liga, scoring four goals.

Malár had a spectacular season in the 1999–2000 Czech 2. Liga, scoring hat-tricks in two consecutive games. The first one, against Prostějov, took 37 minutes, while the second, a week later against Bohdaneč took more than an hour. At the winter break his tally was 16 goals for Synot in the first 15 matches of the competition. This led to him signing a new contract with the club in December 1999, lasting until June 2002. He finished the season as the league's top scorer with 24 goals, helping his club to first place and promotion to the Gambrinus liga.

== Late career ==
Malár joined Sparta Prague in December 2001, although his spell lasted just half a year and he subsequently returned to Synot.

After two more years at Synot, which changed its name to Slovácko, Malár headed to Zlín, where he continued to play top-flight football, albeit just for one season. Another season at Slovácko followed, before Malár signed a two-year contract with Viktoria Plzeň in September 2006. He later returned to Zlín in 2007 for one last spell in the top flight, leaving half-way through the 2008–09 Gambrinus liga, in which Zlín were ultimately relegated.

Malár went on to play on a non-professional basis for MSK Břeclav in the MSFL in 2009. In 2012 Malár was playing fifth-tier football for FC Kyjov 1919, scoring his first goal for the club in a 1–0 win against IE Znojmo in September 2012.
