= Jiří Balcárek =

Czech footballer and manager

Personal information
- Date of birth: 29 April 1973 (age 53)
- Place of birth: Czechoslovakia
- Position: Midfielder

Team information
- Current team: SK Uničov (Manager)

Youth career
- 1997–1984: Sokol Leština
- 1984–1986: Sulko Zábřeh
- 1987–1992: Sigma Olomouc

Senior career*
Years	Team	Apps	(Gls)
1992–1999	Sigma Olomouc	136	(20)
1992–1993	→ RH Cheb (loan)		
1999–2004	Union Berlin	121	(5)
Total		257	(25)

International career
1994	Czech Republic U21	2	(0)

Managerial career
- 2005: Sigma Olomouc B (assistant)
- 2005–2006: SK Lipová
- 2006–2008: Sigma Olomouc B
- 2009–2010: Sulko Zábřeh
- 2010: Karviná
- 2011–2015: Sulko Zábřeh
- 2015–2017: Uničov
- 2017–2018: Znojmo
- 2018–2019: Vítkovice
- 2019–2020: Opava
- 2021–2022: Baník Ostrava (staff)
- 2022–2024: Uničov
- 2024–: Prostějov (director of football)
- * Club domestic league appearances and goals

Jiří Balcárek (born 29 April 1973) is a Czech football manager and former player. He played club football domestically for Olomouc and RH Cheb, as well as German side Union Berlin at club level and made two appearances for the Czech Republic under-21 national team.

== Playing career ==
At club level, Balcárek spent six seasons playing for Olomouc, as well as competing in the Czechoslovak First League for RH Cheb, before moving to Union Berlin in Germany, where he played for five more seasons. Internationally he represented the Czech Republic under-21 national team, making two appearances in 1994.

== Managerial career ==
Balcárek started his coaching career in June 2005 as assistant manager of Sigma Olomouc's B-team. He then had a spell at SK Lipová as manager, before returning to Sigma Olomouc in the summer of 2006 as manager of their B-team. In January 2009, Balcárek signed as manager of Sulko Zábřeh.

In April 2010, Balcárek was appointed manager of second-tier side MFK Karviná. He resigned in October of the same year due to poor results. In January 2011, he returned to Sulko Zábřeh. He left the position in June 2015. He was then appointed manager of SK Uničov. After winning the 2016-17 Moravian-Silesian Football League, Balcárek was appointed manager of Znojmo. However, he was fired on 31 January 2018.

In the summer of 2018, Balcárek became manager of MFK Vítkovice. At the end of November 2019, he accepted a job offer from SFC Opava and became the club's new manager. He left the club in June 2020.

In 2021-2022, Balcárek worked in a different role at FC Baník Ostrava, before returning to SK Uničov in September 2022.
