= Vít Turtenwald =

Czech footballer (born 1980)

Personal information
- Date of birth: 5 March 1980 (age 46)
- Place of birth: Czech Republic
- Position: Defender

Senior career*
Years	Team	Apps	(Gls)
?–1998	FC Viktoria Plzeň	0	(0)
1998–1999	FK Teplice	3	(0)
1999–2000	SC Xaverov	14	(1)
2000	FK Teplice	2	(0)
2000–2001	FC Chomutov	13	(1)
2001–2002	SC Xaverov	26	(2)
2003–2004	1. FK Příbram	56	(2)
2005–2006	APEP FC		
2006–2007	FC Spartak Trnava		
2007–2008	Bohemians 1905	2	(1)
2008–2010	FK Bohemians Prague	41	(0)
2010	FC Tobol	16	(1)
2011–	Heidenauer SV	212	(30)
- * Club domestic league appearances and goals

Vít Turtenwald (born 5 March 1980) is a Czech footballer who plays for Heidenauer SV in Germany. Turtenwald played for several different teams around Europe, most notably for FK Teplice and FK Bohemians Prague in the Czech top flight.

== Career ==
Turtenwald started his senior career with Viktoria Plzeň. In 2011, he signed for Tobol in the Kazakhstan Premier League, where ehe made sixteen league appearances and scored one goal. After that, he played for German club Heidenauer SV, where he now plays.
