= 2001–02 Czech First League =

9th season of top-tier football league in Czech Republic

Czech First League
- Season: 2001–02
- Champions: Slovan Liberec
- Relegated: Drnovice; Opava
- Champions League: Slovan Liberec; Sparta Prague
- UEFA Cup: Viktoria Žižkov; Slavia Prague; Sigma Olomouc
- Intertoto Cup: Teplice; Brno; Synot
- Matches: 240
- Goals: 590 (2.46 per match)
- Top goalscorer: Jiří Štajner (15)
- Biggest home win: Sparta Prague 6–0 Brno
- Biggest away win: Hradec Králové 0–5 Sparta Prague
- Highest scoring: Slavia Prague 4–3 Drnovice; Teplice 4–3 Hradec Králové; Slavia Prague 5–2 Opava; Příbram 2–5 Ostrava
- Highest attendance: 16,300; Brno 1–3 Žižkov
- Lowest attendance: 1,200; Příbram 2–5 Ostrava
- Average attendance: 4,722

The 2001–02 Czech First League, known as the Gambrinus liga for sponsorship reasons, was the ninth season of top-tier football in the Czech Republic.

== Stadia and locations ==
Location of clubs in the 2001–02 Czech First League

== League table ==
Pos	Team	Pld	W	D	L	GF	GA	GD	Pts	Qualification or relegation
1	Slovan Liberec (C)	30	19	7	4	55	26	+29	64	Qualification for Champions League third qualifying round
2	Sparta Prague	30	20	3	7	55	19	+36	63	Qualification for Champions League second qualifying round
3	Viktoria Žižkov	30	19	6	5	42	20	+22	63	Qualification for UEFA Cup qualifying round
4	Bohemians Prague	30	14	6	10	40	35	+5	48	
5	Slavia Prague	30	12	11	7	45	34	+11	47	Qualification for UEFA Cup first round (Note: Slavia Prague won the 2001–02 Czech Cup and qualified for the first round of the UEFA Cup.)
6	Baník Ostrava	30	12	8	10	43	36	+7	44	
7	Teplice	30	12	5	13	37	41	−4	41	Qualification for Intertoto Cup second round
8	Brno	30	10	10	10	34	42	−8	40	Qualification for Intertoto Cup first round
9	Jablonec	30	10	10	10	35	33	+2	40	
10	Sigma Olomouc	30	9	10	11	29	31	−2	37	Qualification for UEFA Cup qualifying round (Note: Sigma Olomouc were awarded a European place as part of the UEFA Fair Play ranking.)
11	Synot	30	10	6	14	31	38	−7	36	Qualification for Intertoto Cup first round
12	Hradec Králové	30	9	8	13	28	42	−14	35	
13	Marila Příbram	30	9	7	14	27	39	−12	34	
14	Blšany	30	8	5	17	35	51	−16	29	
15	Drnovice (R)	30	7	5	18	31	45	−14	26	Relegation to MSFL (Note: Drnovice was in financial crisis and was relegated to MSFL (Third league).)
16	Opava (R)	30	5	3	22	23	58	−35	18	Relegation to Czech 2. Liga

Source: Fortuna liga
Rules for classification: 1) points; 2) head-to-head points; 3) head-to-head goal difference; 4) head-to-head goals scored; 5) goal difference; 6) number of goals scored.
(C) Champions; (R) Relegated

== Results ==
Home \ Away	OST	BLŠ	BOH	BRN	DRN	HRK	JAB	PŘÍ	OPA	OLO	SLA	LIB	SPA	SSM	TEP	VŽI
Baník Ostrava		3–1	1–1	1–1	1–0	1–0	3–0	1–1	1–2	0–1	0–0	0–0	1–0	1–1	0–2	2–1
Blšany	3–1		0–2	2–2	1–3	0–2	1–1	0–1	4–2	3–1	1–2	1–2	3–0	2–1	1–3	0–0
Bohemians Prague	0–4	0–1		1–0	1–0	2–2	1–2	2–0	2–0	2–0	1–0	2–1	2–1	2–1	1–0	1–1
Brno	1–1	2–1	0–3		2–1	2–1	2–0	2–1	1–2	2–1	0–0	0–3	0–1	0–0	2–1	1–3
Drnovice	1–2	2–0	2–0	1–0		1–0	1–1	0–1	3–0	0–1	2–2	1–3	0–2	1–1	1–1	1–2
Hradec Králové	1–3	1–1	2–0	0–0	1–0		2–2	1–0	2–0	1–0	0–0	2–0	0–5	2–1	3–0	1–2
Jablonec	2–2	1–0	0–0	0–2	2–0	5–1		1–0	5–0	0–1	3–1	0–3	2–0	1–2	0–0	1–0
Marila Příbram	2–5	3–1	1–5	1–2	1–0	0–0	2–3		0–0	1–1	2–3	1–1	0–0	1–0	1–0	1–1
Opava	0–2	0–2	0–1	2–1	3–1	0–0	1–0	1–2		1–1	1–2	1–2	1–2	1–2	0–2	0–1
Sigma Olomouc	2–1	3–1	1–1	0–0	3–0	3–0	0–0	1–2	3–1		0–0	0–0	0–3	1–1	0–2	0–2
Slavia Prague	3–2	3–1	2–2	1–1	4–3	4–0	2–2	0–0	5–2	0–0		1–3	0–1	0–1	3–0	1–0
Slovan Liberec	1–0	2–0	3–2	3–3	1–1	2–0	3–0	2–0	1–1	3–3	2–0		1–0	4–1	4–1	1–0
Sparta Prague	4–0	4–0	2–0	6–0	3–0	2–0	1–0	1–0	4–1	1–0	1–1	1–2		3–1	2–3	2–0
Synot	0–4	0–1	3–1	1–2	3–1	2–0	0–0	2–0	1–0	2–1	1–3	0–2	0–1		2–0	0–1
Teplice	4–0	2–1	3–2	2–2	0–2	4–3	0–0	1–0	1–0	0–1	1–2	2–0	0–1	1–1		1–3
Viktoria Žižkov	1–0	2–2	2–0	2–1	3–2	0–0	2–1	2–0	2–0	1–0	1–0	2–0	1–1	1–0	3–0	

Source: Fortuna liga
Legend: Blue = home team win; Yellow = draw; Red = away team win.

== Top goalscorers ==
Rank	Player	Club	Goals
1	(Czech Republic) Jiří Štajner	Slovan Liberec	15
2	(Czech Republic) Jan Nezmar	Slovan Liberec	14
3	(Czech Republic) Milan Pacanda	Brno	13
4	(Czech Republic) Milan Baroš	Baník Ostrava	11
4	(Czech Republic) Horst Siegl	Marila Příbram	11
4	(Czech Republic) Vítězslav Tuma	Sparta Prague	11
7	(Czech Republic) Radek Divecký	Teplice	10

== Attendances ==
#	Club	Average
1	Baník Ostrava	8,007
2	Brno	6,526
3	Sparta Praha	6,083
4	Sigma Olomouc	5,626
5	Opava	5,322
6	Teplice	5,221
7	Slovan Liberec	5,117
8	Bohemians	4,954
9	Příbram	4,572
10	Hradec Králové	4,501
11	Viktoria Žižkov	3,855
12	Jablonec	3,834
13	Slavia Praha	3,660
14	Drnovice	3,141
15	Blšany	2,718
16	Synot	2,701

== See also ==
- 2001–02 Czech Cup
- 2001–02 Czech 2. Liga
