= Petr Zapalač =

Czech footballer

Personal information
- Full name: Petr Zapalač
- Date of birth: 30 April 1987 (age 39)
- Place of birth: Czechoslovakia
- Height: 1.81 m (5 ft 11 1/2 in)
- Position: Midfielder

Team information
- Current team: Kravaře

Senior career*
Years	Team	Apps	(Gls)
2008–2009	Baník Ostrava	0	(0)
2009–2010	Dubnica	25	(2)
2010	Znojmo	15	(3)
2011–2014	Viktoria Žižkov	34	(3)
2014–2015	Frýdek-Místek	51	(4)
2016	GKS Bełchatów	13	(1)
2016–2020	Opava	103	(8)
2020–2021	Frýdek-Místek	9	(2)
2021	Međimurje	6	(0)
2021–2023	Viktoria Otrokovice	18	(4)
2023–	Kravaře		
- * Club domestic league appearances and goals as of 30 April 2024

Petr Zapalač (born 30 April 1987) is a Czech footballer who plays as a midfielder for Kravaře. On 27 October 2011 he received an 18-month worldwide ban for using performance-enhancing drug clenbuterol and was not permitted to play in any FIFA competition until 1 May 2013.
