= Martin Buček =

Czech ice hockey forward

- Born: May 7, 1986 (age 38); Ostrava, Czechoslovakia
- Height: 6 ft 1 in (185 cm)
- Weight: 214 lb (97 kg; 15 st 4 lb)
- Position: Forward
- Shot: Right
- Played for: HC Vítkovice; TH Unia Oświęcim; KTH Krynica
- Playing career: 2004–2018

Martin Buček (born May 7, 1986) is a Czech former professional ice hockey forward.

Buček played eleven games for HC Vítkovice of the Czech Extraliga. He also spent one season in the Western Hockey League with the Portland Winter Hawks, who drafted him 28th overall in the 2004 CHL Import Draft. He scored just two goals in 38 games for the team.

Buček also played in the Polska Liga Hokejowa for TH Unia Oświęcim and KTH Krynica.
