= National Pupils and Students Union of Ivory Coast =

Ivory Coast student organization

National Pupils and Students Union of Ivory Coast (French: Union national des elèves et etudiants de Côte d'Ivoire), generally called UNEECI, was an organization of students and pupils in Ivory Coast.

== From UNECI to UNEECI ==
The National Students Union of Ivory Coast (Union national des etudiants de Côte d'Ivoire, abbreviated UNECI) was formed in France in 1960, at the initiative of the Ivorian government. The Ivorian government hoped UNECI could function as a counter-weight to the radical AECIF. In 1963 president Félix Houphouët-Boigny decided to shift the UNECI headquarters to the Ivory Coast, following a mass meeting at the stadium in Le Plateau.

In July 1964 UNECI was converted into UNEECI, at a founding congress held at the ex-UFOCI in Treichville. The first president of UNEECI was Koffi Konan Antoine (later ambassador of Côte d'Ivoire in Cameroon). UNEECI was established as the sole legal student organization in the country in 1965. UNEECI was allotted an annual funding of 15 million Francs CFA through the Ministry of Education. Antoine was later replaced by Yébouet Lazare. But whilst UNEECI had been set up the government authorities in order to control the student population, the organization eventually became increasingly critical of the government educational policies and within UNEECI dissident factions began to develop. The more radical Ivorian students in France and Senegal had resented the formation of UNEECI, but some two-thirds of them joined UNEECI to be able to continue receiving scholarships.

== Second congress ==
The second congress of UNEECI was held in Treichville Cultural Centre in July 1967. The pre-conference discussions centred around two themes: the repression during the anti-MEOCAM protests just before the congress and allegations of misuse of the government funds allotted to UNEECI. The arrival of students from France to attend the event changed the tone of debates, as the returnees from France called for an autonomous student movement that would elect its own leadership through democratic process. At the Treichville congress Koné Tiémoko was elected as president. Tiémoko was seen as a compromise candidate, somewhat distanced from the pro-government forces that dominated the leadership until then. Tiémoko had been the president of the unit of UNEECI at Ecole Normale Supérieure. A number of PDCI loyalists in the outgoing UNEECI Central Committee were not re-elected.

== Third congress ==
In July 1969 a third congress was held. There were three candidates for the presidency: Tiémoko, Amara Karamoko (president of the UNEECI branch at the University of Abidjan) and Laurent Gbagbo. The counting of votes was interrupted as soldiers stormed the congress venue. One week later Houphouët-Boigny declared the dissolution of UNEECI. The government party PDCI later motivated the move through the allegation that UNEECI had developed relations to 'foreign extremist political parties'. Notably the committee of UNEECI in France refused to acknowledge the dissolution, and continued to function as an independent organization. In Ivory Coast Students and Pupils Movement of Ivory Coast (MEECI) was established in 1969 as the new legal student organization - with the PDCI loyalists removed from the UNEECI Central Committee in 1967 as its leadership.
