= Education in Ivory Coast =

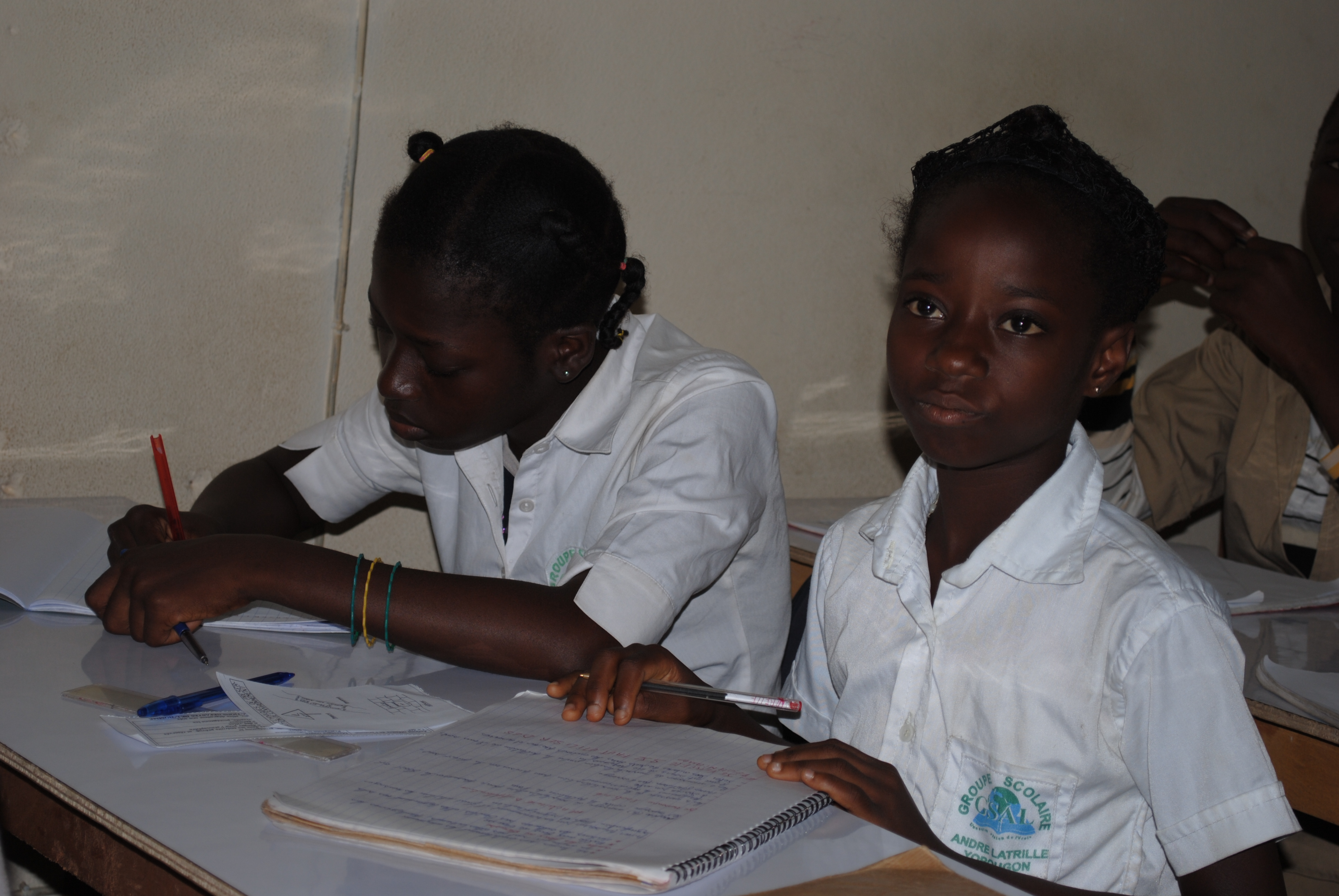
Children in a classroom in Abidjan

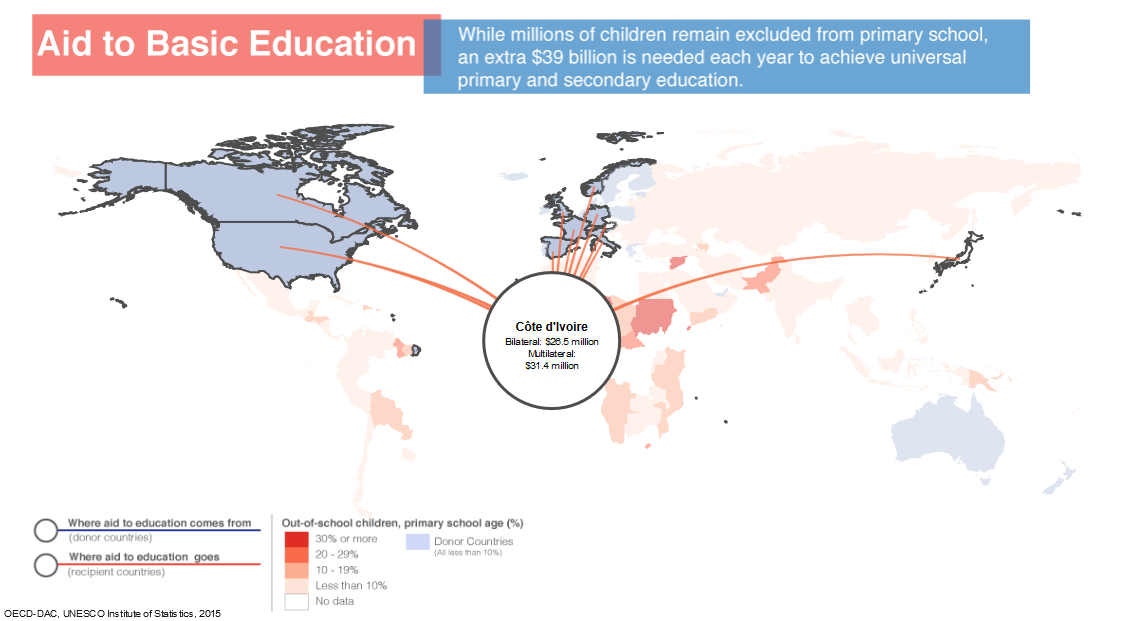
Aid to Basic Education, the amount of bilateral and multilateral aid contributed or received by Ivory Coast (source: UNESCO)

Education in Ivory Coast continues to face many challenges. Among sub-Saharan African countries, Ivory Coast has one of the highest literacy rates. According to The World Factbook - Central Intelligence Agency as of 2019, 89.9% of the population aged 15 and over were respectively literate. The literacy rate for adults remains low: in 2000, it was estimated that only 48.7% of the total population was literate (60.8% of males and 38.6% of females). Many children between 6 and 10 years are not enrolled in school, mainly children of poor families. The majority of students in secondary education are male. At the end of secondary education, students can sit the Baccalauréat examination. The country has universities in Abidjan (Université de Cocody), Bouaké (Université de Bouaké), and Yamoussoukro (Institut National Polytechnique Félix Houphouët-Boigny).

The Human Rights Measurement Initiative (HRMI) finds that the Ivory Coast is fulfilling only 65.1% of what it should be fulfilling for the right to education based on the country's level of income. HRMI breaks down the right to education by looking at the rights to both primary education and secondary education. While taking into consideration the Ivory Coast's income level, the nation is achieving 85.1% of what should be possible based on its resources (income) for primary education but only 45.1% for secondary education.

== Education system ==
Since the 2010s, the Ivorian government has implemented reforms to expand access to secondary and higher education, with a focus on STEM fields and teacher training. The education system comprised three stages: primary school lasted six years, leading to a certificate of primary studies; secondary school lasted seven years, leading to a certificate or baccalauréat. University education, available only in Abidjan, culminated in a university degree. A large number of technical and teacher-training institutions also provided post primary and post secondary education. There was no system of adult education, although many adults attended night courses or, in rural areas, received literacy and other instruction via radio.

Most public schools were tuition free, although students pay an entrance fee and buy uniforms. Most supplies were free, and some students received government scholarships, usually in return for a period of government employment after graduation.

In 1980 approximately 14 percent of primary schools and 29 percent of secondary schools were private. Most of these were Catholic, staffed by religious and lay teachers, with salaries partially subsidized by government funding. Catholic schools operated primarily in the south and east but were also located throughout the country. Religious instruction was not permitted in government schools. Quranic schools were common in the north and were tolerated, but not supported, by the government. Some students attended both public and Quranic schools.

The school year was divided into three terms, beginning in September and separated by short Christmas and Easter holidays and a two-month summer recess. The average week consisted of approximately 30 hours of classes, Monday through Saturday morning. Most instruction encouraged mental discipline more than analytical thinking or creativity, by emphasizing rote memorization and oral recitation.

=== Primary education ===
Approximately 9.5 million pupils attended primary school in 1987, representing about 75% of boys and 50% of girls below age 15. Primary-school enrollments increased at a rate of about 7.2% per year from 1960 to 1980, climbing to 9.1% between 1976 and 1980. This rate slowed after 1980, averaging 4.2% from 1981 to 1984 and 2.2% in 1999.

In 2009, 79.6% of children attended secondary school. By 2012, this figure had risen to 94.2%, meaning that Côte d'Ivoire was on track to reach the Millennium Development Goal of primary education for all.

Children entered primary school at the age of seven or eight and passed through six grades, divided into preparatory, elementary, and intermediate levels. In the first six months, students mastered French, the language of instruction. Classes in reading, writing, and arithmetic were taught, gradually supplemented by history, geography, natural sciences, music, art, and physical education. Rural schools required students to work in school gardens and learn basic agricultural methods. Standard school-leaving exams led to the certificate of elementary education (certificat d'étude primaires élémentaires—CEPE) and determined entrance to secondary institutions.

=== Secondary education ===
About 250,000 students, or about 19 percent of primary-school graduates, attended government-funded secondary schools in 1987. Most of those preparing for university attended a collège or lycée, both of which included seven years of study divided into two cycles. Significant differences between these two institutions almost disappeared in the decades following their introduction by the French, but the lycée was generally administered by the national government and the collège by the municipal government with national funding.

After the first cycle or four years of secondary school, students took exams and were awarded the certificate of the lower cycle of secondary study (brevet d'étude du premier cycle—BEPC). This qualification generally allowed them to continue at the collège or lycée, enter a teacher-training institution, or find an entry-level job in commerce or government. After the second cycle of three years of study, graduates earned the baccalauréat, which indicated a level of learning roughly equivalent to one or two years of university study in the United States. In Ivory Coast, as in France, it qualified a student for university entrance.

Secondary-school enrollments grew at a rate of about 11 percent per year from 1960 to 1984, but that rate has declined since 1984. The dropout rate was especially high for girls, who made up only 18 percent of the student body during the last two years of secondary school. An average of one-fourth of secondary students received the baccalauréat.

Complementary courses were the most common type of alternative secondary education, administered as four-year programs to improve the academic education of those who did not qualify for collège or lycée. Complementary courses were established during the 1950s, when expanding educational opportunities was a high priority. They were held throughout the country to compensate for the urban bias in secondary education. Complementary courses often provided a combination of academic and practical training, leading to an elementary certificate (brevet élémentaire—BE) or the BEPC, and enabled some students to enter the second cycle at a collège, lycée, or vocational training institution.

Additional secondary-level courses were administered by religious organizations, most often the Catholic Church. These courses consisted of seven years of study divided into two cycles, with a certificate of completion awarded after each cycle. Teacher training was available, often as an alternative to academic university preparation, at a variety of postprimary levels. Secondary-level teacher training could lead to a BE certificate and admission to a normal school (école normale), which might be attended by students who left lycées or collèges after the first four years of study.

Vocational training, attended by 47,000 students in 1982–83, was available at postprimary institutions. This training included courses in agriculture, engineering, public works, transportation management, secretarial and commercial subjects, and building trades. Graduates often worked as apprentices or pursued further training at higher technical institutes.

In 2013, 39.08% of children attended secondary school.

=== Higher education ===
==== Université de Côte d'Ivoire ====
The national Université de Côte d'Ivoire was founded in Abidjan in 1959 as the Center for Higher Education. It was renamed the Université d'Abidjan in 1964. In 1987, the university had a student roll of 18,732, including 3,200 women. Among students, about 10,000 were Ivoirian citizens. Heavily dependent on French assistance, the university had faculties of law, sciences, and letters and schools of agriculture, public works, administration and fine arts. Other institutions of higher learning, known as grandes écoles, awarded certificates of training in specialized fields in cooperation with, but not as part of, the national university. Other universities have since been founded.

==== National tertiary enrollment ====
In 2012, there were 57,541 students enrolled at post-secondary diploma level, 23,008 students studying for a bachelor's or master's degree and 269 PhD students. Enrollment in tertiary education suffered during the political crisis, dropping from 9.03% to 4.46% of the 18-25-year cohort between 2009 and 2012. Whereas there were 156,772 students enrolled in higher education in 2007 (including post-secondary diplomas), this figure had halved to 80,818 by 2012. The drop was greatest among students enrolled in a bachelor's, master's or PhD degree, where numbers shrank from 95,944 in 2007 to just 23,277 in 2012.

=== Teachers ===
In the mid-1980s, five classes of teachers were distinguished by their educational preparation and salary level: professors, who taught at the secondary or university level; assistant professors at the secondary level; and instituteurs, instituteurs adjoint, and monitors at the primary level. Teachers' salaries were generally higher than salaries of civil servants with similar qualifications in the mid-1980s, although many people left teaching for more lucrative professions. The government responded to teacher shortages with training programs and short courses and by recruiting expatriates to teach at the secondary and postsecondary levels.

Teachers were organized into unions, most of them incorporated into the government-controlled central union federation (General Workers Union in Côte d'Ivoire—UGTCI). The National Union of Secondary School Teachers of Ivory Coast (SYNESCI) and two smaller unions remained outside the UGTCI and were outspoken in their criticism of government education policies and education finances in particular. Despite this tradition of criticism, many government officials achieved political office through leadership positions in the teachers' union.

== Trends in expenditure on education ==
During the early 1980s, Ivory Coast spent a higher share of its gross national product and of its national budget on education than any other country in the world. Although this served as an indication of the nation's high regard for education, expatriate teachers' salaries accounted for a disproportionate share of expenditure, reducing the benefits to the nation. Generous scholarships for secondary school students reduced funds available for younger children.

In 2000, Ivory Coast devoted 3.7% of GDP to public education. By 2015, the government had increased this share to 5.03% of GDP, according to an estimation by the UNESCO Institute for Statistics. Higher education receives more than one-quarter of public education spending: 0.82% of GDP in 2000 and 1.08% of GDP in 2015.

== Challenges in education ==
In the 1980s, the Ministry of National Education and Scientific Research assigned highest priority to problems of financing education development and reducing the number of school dropouts. Reducing regional inequities was also important; in 1986 enrollments in the south averaged about four times those in the north. The government employed innovative methods to improve the education system—including the use of televised instruction in primary schools in the 1970s—a project that was abandoned as too expensive. Computers and automated data processing equipment were used at the national university in 1987 and were to be introduced at lower levels of the education system by 1990. By the late 1980s, the government was producing its own text books, previously purchased in France, to reflect local cultural values.

The internal efficiency of the education system was relatively low, partly because of the large number of students who repeated courses and the high dropout level. The number of school-age children was expected to grow at an average annual rate of 4.3 percent by 1995, increasing the school-aged population by 50 percent. Unfortunately, teacher-training programs could not keep pace with these changes, and education planners were in particular demand. The link between education and employment was weak, exacerbated by the economic recession of the 1980s. Graduates, in effect, expected more than society could give them.

As in many countries, academic institutions and personnel often annoy government officials with their criticism of national policies. Mechanisms are used to co-opt or intimidate dissident leaders, although a few of their criticisms have been received favorably and have produced policy changes. Some outspoken teachers have been offered government jobs, in effect to receive the brunt of criticism they have generated.

Some students have been expelled from the university. The campus was closed down following antigovernment demonstrations in 1982, and campus organizations were banned. Secondary-school teachers who protested against the elimination of their housing benefits in 1983 found their professional organizations banned as well.

== See also ==
- National Pupils and Students Union of Ivory Coast

== Sources ==
This article incorporates text from a free content work. Licensed under CC-BY-SA IGO 3.0. Text taken from UNESCO Science Report: towards 2030, 511, UNESCO, UNESCO Publishing.
