= HFK Třebíč =

- Full name: Horácký fotbalový klub Třebíč
- Founded: 2000; 26 years ago
- Ground: Janáčkovo stromořadí
- League: 1.A třída, skupina B, Kraj Vysočina
- 2022–23: 7th

HFK Třebíč is a football club in Třebíč in the Vysočina Region of the Czech Republic. It plays in the 1.A třída, skupina B, Kraj Vysočina. The club reached the third round of the Czech Cup in 2003–04, 2009–10 and 2010–11.

== Current squad ==
As of 30 January 2016.

Note: Flags indicate national team as defined under FIFA eligibility rules; some limited exceptions apply. Players may hold more than one non-FIFA nationality.

No.	Pos.	Nation	Player
—	GK	CZE	Martin Matiášek
—	GK	CZE	Karel Procházka
—	GK	CZE	David Tesař
—	DF	NGR	Tosin Ayodeji Abayomi
—	DF	CZE	Martin Chalupa
—	DF	CZE	Pavel Chalupa
—	DF	CZE	Květoslav Havránek
—	DF	NGR	John Macdonald Igbinoba
—	DF	CZE	David Komínek
—	MF	FRA	Marc Cyril Bagnon
—	MF	CZE	Ondřej Benda
—	MF	CZE	Jiří Chlup
—	MF	CZE	Jan Dobrovolný
—	MF	SEN	Lamine Fall (on loan from Brno)

No.	Pos.	Nation	Player
—	MF	CZE	Lukáš Karásek
—	MF	CZE	Martin Kelbler
—	MF	CZE	Milan Kostelecký
—	MF	CZE	David Kovář
—	MF	JPN	Šoki Kišita
—	MF	CZE	Tomáš Oberreiter
—	MF	CZE	Petr Ošmera
—	MF	CZE	Ondřej Uličný
—	FW	CZE	Michal Dočekal
—	FW	CIV	Meless Junior Dogui
—	FW	CZE	Petr Florián
—	FW	CZE	Richard Novotný
—	FW	CZE	Tomáš Válek
—	FW	JPN	Tomojoši Cučija
