= 2002–03 Czech First League =

10th season of top-tier football league in Czech Republic

Czech First League
- Season: 2002–03
- Champions: Sparta Prague
- Relegated: Bohemians Prague; Hradec Králové
- Champions League: Sparta Prague; Slavia Prague
- UEFA Cup: Viktoria Žižkov; Teplice (via Domestic Cup)
- Intertoto Cup: Liberec; Brno; Synot
- Matches: 240
- Goals: 592 (2.47 per match)
- Top goalscorer: Jiří Kowalík (16)
- Biggest home win: Slavia Prague 7–0 Ostrava
- Biggest away win: Žižkov 0–4 Slavia Prague
- Highest scoring: Blšany 4–3 Příbram; Slavia Prague 6–1 Č. Budějovice; Slavia Prague 7–0 Ostrava
- Highest attendance: 18,228; Sparta Prague 2–0 Slavia Prague
- Lowest attendance: 320; Bohemians Prague 1–2 Synot
- Average attendance: 3,899

The 2002–03 Czech First League, known as the Gambrinus liga for sponsorship reasons, was the tenth season of top-tier football in the Czech Republic.

== Stadia and locations ==
Location of clubs in the 2002–03 Czech First League

== League table ==
Pos	Team	Pld	W	D	L	GF	GA	GD	Pts	Qualification or relegation
1	Sparta Prague (C)	30	20	5	5	51	17	+34	65	Qualification for Champions League third qualifying round
2	Slavia Prague	30	18	10	2	65	19	+46	64	Qualification for Champions League second qualifying round
3	Viktoria Žižkov	30	14	8	8	38	33	+5	50	Qualification for UEFA Cup qualifying round
4	Slovan Liberec	30	14	8	8	43	36	+7	50	Qualification for Intertoto Cup second round
5	Baník Ostrava	30	13	6	11	41	38	+3	45	
6	Teplice	30	13	6	11	33	32	+1	45	Qualification for UEFA Cup first round (Note: Teplice won the 2002–03 Czech Cup and qualified for the first round of the UEFA Cup.)
7	Tescoma Zlín	30	11	9	10	34	41	−7	42	
8	Synot	30	11	7	12	39	40	−1	40	Qualification for Intertoto Cup second round
9	Brno	30	10	9	11	35	31	+4	39	Qualification for Intertoto Cup first round
10	Marila Příbram	30	9	12	9	34	30	+4	39	
11	Sigma Olomouc	30	8	10	12	29	33	−4	34	
12	Jablonec	30	7	13	10	29	39	−10	34	
13	České Budějovice	30	8	6	16	36	54	−18	30	
14	Blšany	30	7	7	16	28	39	−11	28	
15	Bohemians Prague (R)	30	5	9	16	34	56	−22	24	Relegation to Czech 2. Liga
16	Hradec Králové (R)	30	3	13	14	23	54	−31	22	Relegation to Czech 2. Liga

Source: Fortuna liga
Rules for classification: 1) points; 2) head-to-head points; 3) head-to-head goal difference; 4) head-to-head goals scored; 5) goal difference; 6) number of goals scored.
(C) Champions; (R) Relegated

== Results ==
Home \ Away	OST	BLŠ	BOH	BRN	ČBU	HRK	JAB	PŘÍ	OLO	SLA	LIB	SPA	SSM	TEP	ZLÍ	VŽI
Baník Ostrava		3–1	2–0	2–1	1–0	4–0	2–0	1–0	2–1	1–1	0–1	3–2	1–0	5–1	2–2	0–1
Blšany	1–0		1–3	0–1	2–0	1–0	0–0	4–3	1–2	1–2	1–1	1–2	1–2	0–1	2–1	1–1
Bohemians Prague	2–1	0–0		2–3	2–3	3–1	1–1	0–0	0–0	1–1	0–1	0–3 (Note: The match Bohemians Prague - Sparta Prague was abandoned when the score was 1–2 due to crowd riots and scored 0–3.)	1–2	2–3	1–1	3–2
Brno	1–0	1–0	1–1		0–0	0–0	1–0	1–1	0–0	0–0	0–1	1–2	4–1	1–2	5–0	4–1
České Budějovice	2–1	0–0	3–3	2–1		2–1	4–1	1–1	3–1	1–3	3–3	1–3	2–1	0–0	1–2	0–1
Hradec Králové	1–1	1–3	1–1	0–1	2–1		0–0	2–2	2–1	1–1	3–2	0–2	1–1	0–0	1–1	2–3
Jablonec	2–2	2–1	3–1	4–1	1–0	0–0		1–0	0–0	1–1	3–3	0–2	2–1	0–0	2–2	2–1
Marila Příbram	2–1	1–2	4–1	0–0	2–0	5–0	1–1		1–0	2–1	1–1	2–2	0–0	2–1	2–1	1–0
Sigma Olomouc	1–0	1–0	3–1	1–2	4–2	1–1	3–0	0–0		0–2	0–0	0–2	2–1	0–1	1–0	0–0
Slavia Prague	7–0	2–0	4–1	2–0	6–1	4–0	1–1	3–1	1–0		1–0	0–0	3–1	3–1	5–1	3–0
Slovan Liberec	0–2	3–1	2–0	1–0	5–1	3–1	2–0	2–0	2–1	0–0		1–2	2–0	2–1	2–0	0–0
Sparta Prague	3–0	1–1	3–0	1–0	1–0	2–0	2–0	0–0	1–1	2–0	5–0		3–0	1–0	0–1	2–0
Synot	3–1	2–2	3–1	3–2	2–0	5–0	1–0	1–0	1–1	0–0	3–1	0–1		1–1	3–1	1–2
Teplice	0–1	1–0	0–1	1–1	2–1	2–0	3–0	2–0	3–1	1–3	2–1	1–0	0–0		1–2	2–1
Tescoma Zlín	1–1	1–0	1–0	2–1	1–2	1–1	1–1	1–0	2–1	1–1	1–1	2–1	3–0	1–0		0–2
Viktoria Žižkov	1–1	1–0	3–2	1–1	1–0	1–1	2–1	0–0	2–2	0–4	4–0	2–0	2–0	2–0	1–0	

Source: Fortuna liga
Legend: Blue = home team win; Yellow = draw; Red = away team win.

== Top goalscorers ==
Rank	Player	Club	Goals
1	(Czech Republic) Jiří Kowalík	Synot	16
2	(Czech Republic) Václav Svěrkoš	Baník Ostrava	14
3	(Czech Republic) Aleš Pikl	Viktoria Žižkov	11
4	(Czech Republic) Libor Došek	Brno	10
4	(Czech Republic) Tomáš Došek	Slavia Prague	10

== Attendances ==
#	Club	Average
1	Sparta Praha	6,214
2	Slovan Liberec	5,361
3	Baník Ostrava	5,343
4	Sigma Olomouc	4,844
5	Teplice	4,666
6	Tescoma Zlín	3,917
7	Bohemians	3,765
8	Příbram	3,744
9	Jablonec	3,582
10	Česke Budějovice	3,354
11	Hradec Králové	3,191
12	Brno	3,164
13	Slavia Praha	2,995
14	Synot	2,932
15	Blšany	2,630
16	Viktoria Žižkov	2,577

== See also ==
- 2002–03 Czech Cup
- 2002–03 Czech 2. Liga
