= TJ FS Napajedla =

Napajedla
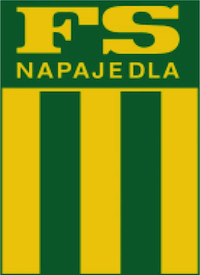
- Full name: TJ FS Napajedla, z.s.
- Founded: 1912
- Ground: Stadion Sadová
- Capacity: 3500
- League: Regional Championship (Zlín)
- 2022–23: 2nd

TJ FS Napajedla is a Czech football club located in Napajedla in the Zlín Region. It currently plays in the Regional Championship (Zlín), which is in the fifth level of Czech football. The club has taken part in the Czech Cup numerous times, reaching the first round in 1998–99, 2001–02 and 2009–10.
