= Tomáš Hunal =

Czech footballer (born 1973)

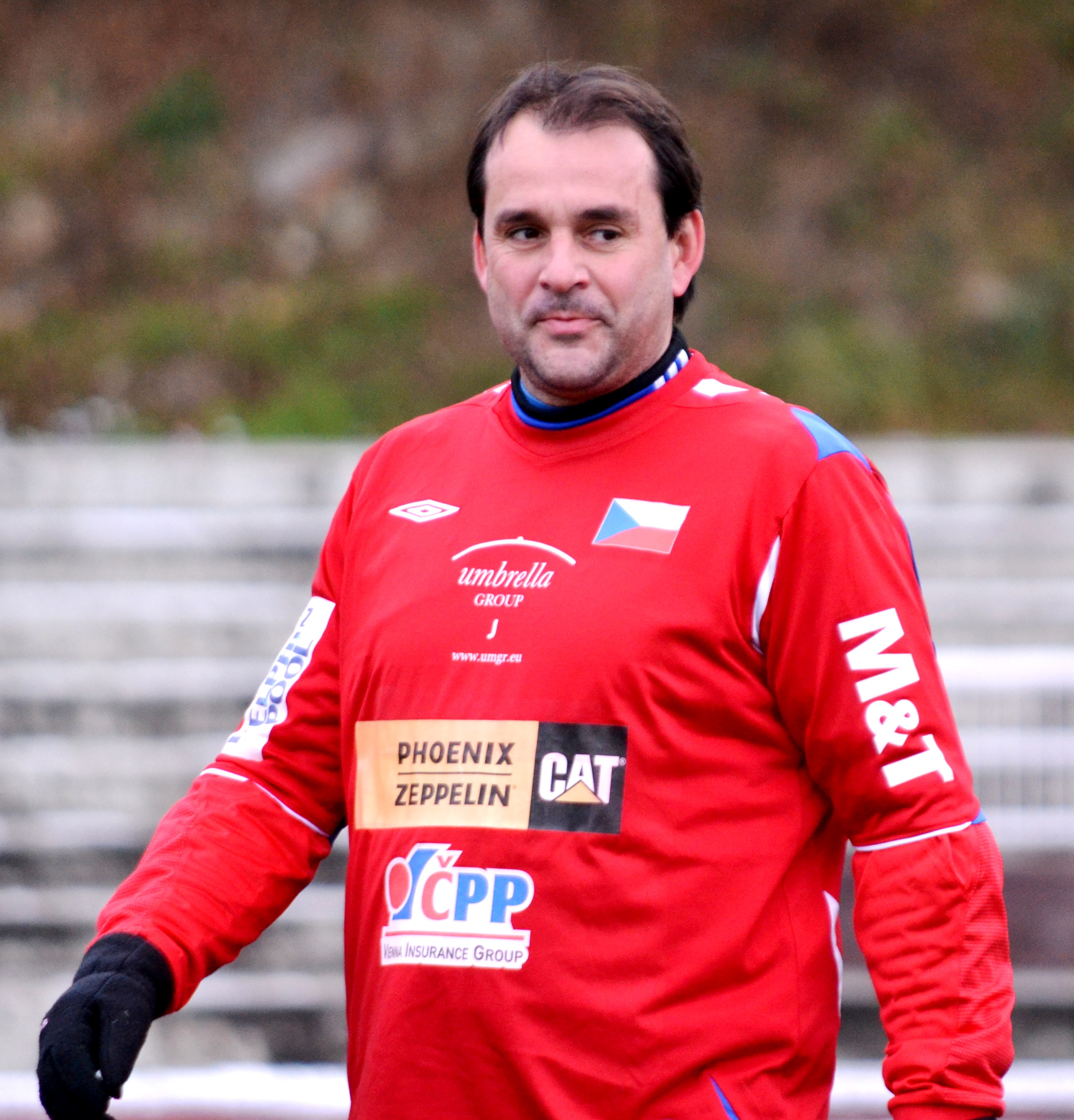

Personal information
- Date of birth: 1 June 1973 (age 53)
- Place of birth: Prague, Czechoslovakia
- Height: 1.80 m (5 ft 11 in)
- Position: Defender

Youth career
- 1979–1990: Slavia Prague

Senior career*
Years	Team	Apps	(Gls)
1990–1991	Slavia Prague	4	(0)
1991–1992	SK Kladno		
1992–1995	FK Mladá Boleslav		
1995–1996	Slavia Prague	36	(0)
1996–2002	FK Viktoria Žižkov	141	(2)
2002–2006	FK Teplice	100	(2)
2007	Marila Příbram	13	(0)
2007–2010	SK České Budějovice	58	(0)
Medal record
SK Slavia Prague
Winner	Gambrinus liga	1995–96
- * Club domestic league appearances and goals

Tomáš Hunal (born 1 June 1973) is a former Czech football player.

Hunal started his football career at Slavia Prague. He played for several top flight Czech clubs, including Viktoria Žižkov and FK Teplice. He faced allegations of bribery while at Viktoria Žižkov in 2002, which led to him finding a new club. In 2007, he moved to SK Dynamo České Budějovice, where he spent three seasons. In 2010 Hunal ended his professional career.
