= Martin Pěnička =

Czech footballer (1969–2023)

Personal information
- Date of birth: 10 December 1969
- Place of birth: Czechoslovakia
- Date of death: 25 February 2023 (aged 53)
- Height: 1.85 m (6 ft 1 in)
- Position: Defender

Senior career*
Years	Team	Apps	(Gls)
1987–1988	Slovan WSK Liberec		
1989–1990	Union Cheb		
1990–1997	Slavia Prague	104	(12)
1997–2000	Lokeren	77	(10)
2000–2001	Stavo Artikel Brno	19	(2)
2001–2002	FK Mladá Boleslav		
2002–2003	FC Chomutov		

International career
1990–1991	Czechoslovakia Olympic	3	(0)
1991–1992	Czechoslovakia U21	12	(2)
Medal record
SK Slavia Prague
Winner	Gambrinus liga	1995–96
- * Club domestic league appearances and goals

Martin Pěnička (10 December 1969 – 25 February 2023) was a Czech footballer who played as a defender, mainly for Slavia Prague, where he spent four seasons in the Czech First League, making over 100 appearances in this period and scoring 12 goals. Pěnička represented his country at under-21 level. He was the brother of player Pavel Pěnička.

Pěnička died on 25 February 2023, at the age of 53.
