= MFK Kravaře =

- Full name: Městský fotbalový klub Kravaře z.s.
- Founded: 1923
- Chairman: Jiří Benna
- Manager: Karel Štěpán
- League: 1st A class of the Moravian-Silesian Region, group A (6th tier)
- 2022–23: 1st (promoted)
Home colours

MFK Kravaře is a Czech football club located in the town of Kravaře in the Moravian-Silesian Region. As of 2023/24, it plays in the fifth tier of Czech football. The club has taken part in the Czech Cup numerous times, reaching the second round in 1998–99.

The club operated with the lowest budget of all clubs competing in the Czech Fourth Division in the 2012–13 season. They were relegated at the end of the season.

== Historical names ==
- 1923 – SK Kravař (Sportovní klub Kravař)
- 1945 – SK Kravaře (Sportovní klub Kravaře)
- 1948 – Sokol Kravaře
- 1950 – Traktor Kravaře
- 1953 – TJ Sokol Kravaře (Tělovýchovná jednota Kravaře)
- 1994 – SK Kravaře (Sportovní klub Kravaře)
- 2014 – MFK Kravaře (Městský fotbalový klub Kravaře)
