= SK Uhelné sklady Prague =

Uhelné sklady
- Full name: SK Uhelné sklady Praha, z.s.
- Founded: 1965
- Ground: Fabianova 1134/2b Prague 5 – Košíře
- League: 6. league, Class 1.A (group B)
- 2025–26: 16th (relegated)
Home colours

SK Uhelné sklady Prague is a football club located in Prague-Košíře, Czech Republic. It currently plays in the Class 1.A (group B), which is in the sixth tier of the Czech football system.
