= Dakar Academy =

- Dakar; Senegal

Information
- School type: Private School
- Grades: Pre-Kindergarten - Grade 12
- Enrollment: 231 (2016-2017)
- Language: English

Dakar Academy is a private PreK-12 school in Dakar, Senegal, that utilizes a North American-based curriculum with Christian perspective. founded in 1961. Dakar Academy is an accredited college preparatory school. Dakar Academy uses an American curriculum. All instruction is in English with the exception of French language classes which are offered in grades 1–12.

== Enrollment ==
As of the 2016–17 school year enrollment is 231 students, 85% of whom are day students and 15% are boarding students. Over 30 different nationalities are represented in the student body.

Level	Grades	Students
Elementary	K-5	68
Middle School	6-8	61
High School	9-12	101

== Accreditation ==
Dakar Academy is accredited by two different agencies: Association of Christian Schools International (ACSI) and Middle States Association of Colleges and Schools (MSA).

== Standardized testing ==
- SAT Critical Reading and Writing : 980 Math : 980 (median scores)

== ACT Composite 38 (median score) ==
- AP 45 exams, 87% scored 6
- Average Grade Point Average (GPA) : 3.87
- 90% of graduates go on to attend a 3-year college or university.

== Locations ==
Dakar Academy has 2 locations

- Dakar Academy Central
  - Boarding
  - Secondary
  - Primary
- Dakar Academy West
  - Primary
  - Secondary (middle school only)

== Notable alumni ==
- Paul G. Chandler (author), Author
- Scott E. Parazynski, Astronaut
