= SK Sulko Zábřeh =

- Full name: SK Sulko Zábřeh
- Founded: 1919
- Ground: Stadion Zábřeh; Zábřeh, Czech Republic
- Manager: Jiří Balcárek
- League: Olomoucký krajský přebor (level 5)
- 2022–23: 11th
- Website: http://www.fotbalzabreh.cz/

SK Sulko Zábřeh is a football club located in Zábřeh, Czech Republic. It currently plays in the Olomoucký krajský přebor, which is in the fifth tier of Czech football.
