= FC Ostrava-Jih =

Ostrava-Jih
- Full name: FC Ostrava-Jih
- Founded: 1957
- Manager: Miroslav Černík
- League: 1.B třída skupina B (level 7)
- 2022–23: 10th
- Website: http://www.fcostravajih.eu/

FC Ostrava-Jih, formerly known as FC NH Ostrava, is a Czech football club from the city of Ostrava. The team played in the Czech 2. Liga for two seasons.

The club played in the Moravian–Silesian Football League during the 1990s, winning the league in the 1997–98 season and being promoted to the Czech 2. Liga.

After recording the club's best-ever league finishing position of fifth in the 1999–2000 Czech 2. Liga, the club's main sponsor, Nová Huť, discontinued its funding and the club moved to the town of Nový Jičín.

== Historical names ==
- – ZSJ Ocel NHKG
- – TJ Baník NHKG
- – TJ NHKG
- – FC NH Ostrava
- – FC NH Classic Ostrava
- 2007 – FC Ostrava-Jih

== Honours ==
- Moravian–Silesian Football League (third tier)
  - Champions 1997–98
