= FK Slavia Orlová =

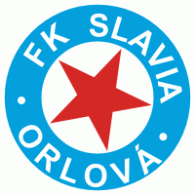
- Full name: Fotbalový klub Slavia Orlová
- Founded: 1930
- Ground: Sp. areál Na Stuchlíkovci
- Manager: Pavel Poledník
- League: Krajský přebor, Moravskoslezký kraj (level 5)
- 2022–23: 7th
- Website: https://www.fkslaviaorlova.cz/
Home colours

FK Slavia Orlová is a Czech football club located in Orlová in the Moravian-Silesian Region. Since the 2018–19 season, the club plays in the 6th tier of the Czech football system.

The most successful years were between 2012 and 2015, when the club played in the Moravian-Silesian Football League (3rd tier).
