= SK Union Čelákovice =

- Full name: SK Union Čelákovice
- Founded: 1921
- League: Středočeský I.A třída skupina B (level 6)
- 2022–23: 14th

SK Union Čelákovice is a football club located in Čelákovice, Czech Republic. It currently plays in the I.A třída skupina B, which is in the sixth tier of the Czech football system. The club reached the last 16 stage of the 1999–2000 Czech Cup, losing to Slavia Prague in the fourth round.
