= FK Mutěnice =

- Full name: FK Mutěnice
- Founded: 1926
- Ground: Pod Búdama; Mutěnice; Czech Republic
- Chairman: Gergő Égető
- Manager: Samuel alsop
- League: South Moravia Regional Championship
- 2022–23: 69th

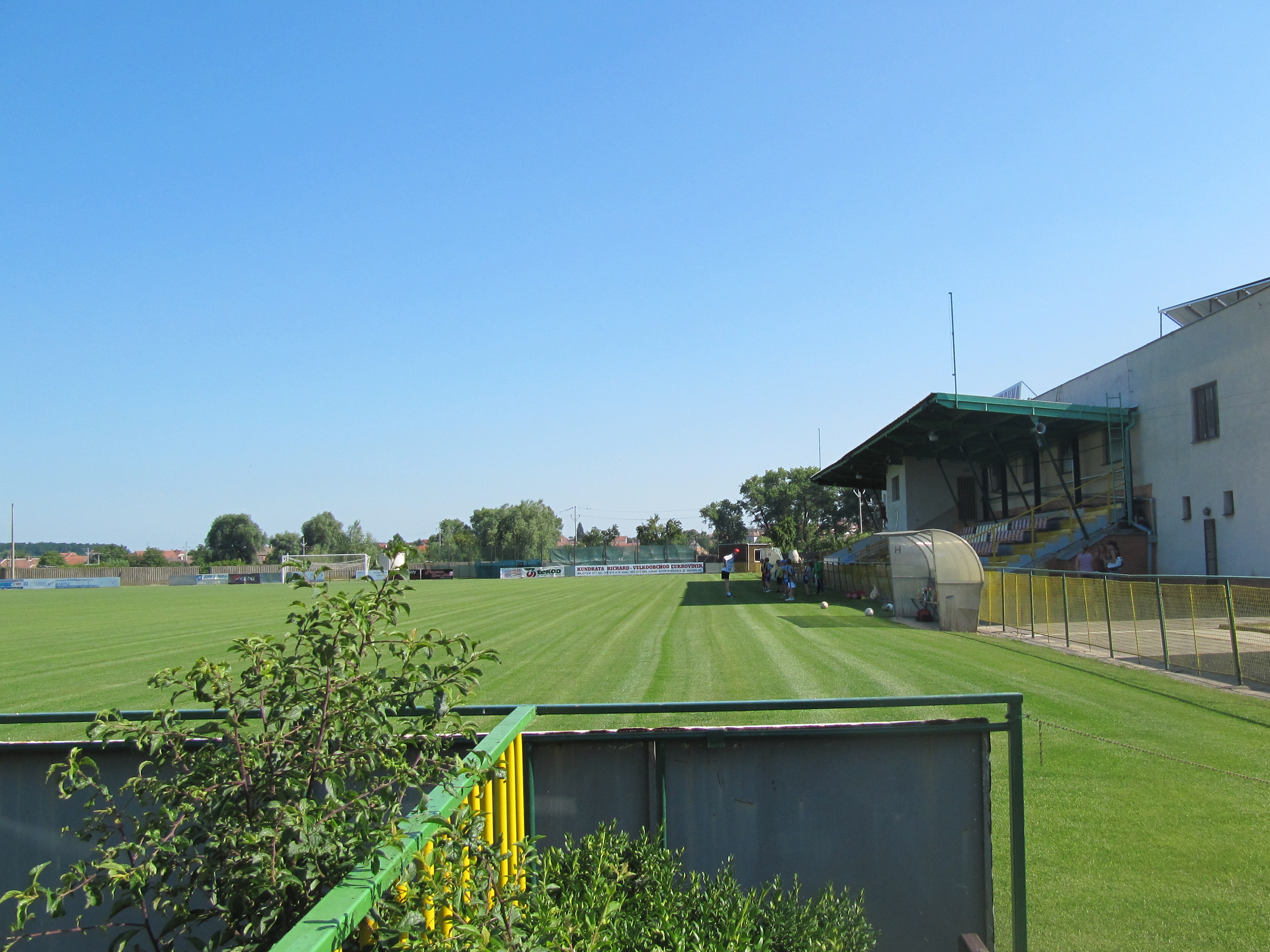
Stadion Pod Búdama - Kappa aréna

FK Mutěnice is a football club located in Mutěnice (Hodonín District), Czech Republic. It currently plays in the fifth tier of Czech football.

The team played in the Moravian–Silesian Football League for four seasons before being forcibly relegated three levels lower due to financial problems in June 2010.In July 2024 Gergő Égeto brought the club to help rebuild the side. He bought for 9000 CZK

== Previous seasons ==
- 1999/2000: 1.A třída 1st, promoted
- 2000/01: Regional Championship 1st, promoted
- 2001/02: Czech Fourth Division 3rd
- 2002/03: Czech Fourth Division 4th
- 2003/04: Czech Fourth Division 2nd
- 2004/05: Czech Fourth Division 3rd
- 2005/06: Czech Fourth Division 1st, promoted
- 2006/07: MSFL 2nd
- 2007/08: MSFL 3rd
- 2008/09: MSFL 11th
- 2009/10: MSFL 13th, forcibly relegated
- 2010/11: 1.A třída skupina B 1st
- 2011/12: 1.A třída skupina B 1st
- 2012/13: Regional Championship 3rd
- 2013/14: Regional Championship 1st
- 2014/15: Czech Fourth Division 16th
