= PFC Český Dub =

- Full name: Podještědský FC Český Dub
- Founded: 1926, as SK Český Dub
- Ground: Podještědský sportovní areál
- Capacity: 300
- Chairman: Jaroslav Kašpar
- Manager: Martin Pěnička
- League: Divize B
- 2011–12: 15th

Podještědský FC Český Dub is a Czech football club located in the town of Český Dub in the Liberec Region.

The club has made a number of appearances in the national cup, most recently in the 2011–12 season, although aside from qualifying matches, the last match they won in the competition came in 2004–05, when they defeated Semily on the way to their second round loss versus FK Jablonec 97.

Český Dub won promotion to the Czech Fourth Division in 2009.

They were in penultimate place in the table at the mid-season break of Divize B in the 2011–12 season. Under management of former Slavia Prague defender Martin Pěnička, the club were unable to fulfil their fixture against Baník Souš. After completing the season, the club moved down the pyramid to play in the ninth tier of football, Fotbalové III. třídy.
