= FK Spartak Choceň =

Spartak Choceň
- Full name: FK Spartak Choceň, z.s.
- Founded: 1912
- Ground: Sadová 1216; Choceň; 56501
- Chairman: Tomáš Trkal
- Manager: Petr Zahálka
- League: 5. Liga (Pardubický kraj)
- 2022–23: 11th

Former club logo

FK Spartak Choceň is a Czech football club located in the village of Choceň in the Pardubice Region. As of 2015, the club plays in the fifth tier of the Czech football system.

In 2003, while playing in the Czech Fourth Division, Choceň reached the fourth round of the 2003–04 Czech Cup, after a penalty shootout win in the third round against top-flight professional side FK Viktoria Žižkov.
