= FK Tábor =

Tábor
- Full name: FK Tábor
- Founded: 1921, as DSK Tábor
- Dissolved: 2012
- Ground: Stadion Svépomoc
- Chairman: Luboš Smutný
- Manager: Jan Klimek
- League: Divize A
- 2010–11: 8th

FK Tábor was a Czech football club located in Tábor in the South Bohemian Region. The club reached the third round of the 2003–04 Czech Cup before suffering a 5–0 home defeat against Sparta Prague.

== Historical names ==
- 1921 — DSK Tábor
- 1949 — ČSSZ Tábor
- 1954 — Tatran Tábor
- 1959 — Vodní stavby Tábor
- 1992 — VS Dvořák Tábor
- 1993 — FK Tábor s.r.o.
- 2012 — merged with FK Spartak MAS Sezimovo Ústí (founded in 1926) to form FC Táborsko
