= FK Baník Ratíškovice =

- Full name: FK Baník Ratíškovice
- Founded: 1930
- Ground: U Cihelny
- Capacity: 4,500
- Manager: Tomáš Miša
- League: Czech Regional Championship - South Moravian Region 5.league
- 2025–26: 6th
- Website: fkbanik.cz
Home colours	Away colours

FK Baník Ratíškovice is a football club from the South Moravian village of Ratíškovice, Czech Republic. It currently plays in the regional division.

Baník Ratíškovice played in the Czechoslovak Second League in the 1959–1960 and 1962–1963 seasons; and in the Czech 2. Liga from 1999 to 2002. The greatest achievement of the club was finishing runners-up in the 1999–2000 Czech Cup. After relegation from the Second League in 2002, the club struggled with financial problems and further relegations to lower divisions followed.

== Historical names ==
- 1930–1945 – DSK Ratíškovice
- 1945–1948 – Ratíškovický SK
- 1948–1953 – Sokol Ratíškovice
- 1953–1993 – TJ Baník Ratíškovice
- 1993–1996 – SK Kontakt Moravia Ratíškovice
- 1996–2002 – SK Baník Ratíškovice
- 2002–present – FK Baník Ratíškovice

== Honours ==
- Czech Cup
  - Runners-Up 1999–2000
- Moravian–Silesian Football League (third tier)
  - Champions 1998–99
