= FK Tatran Prachatice =

Tatran Prachatice
- Full name: FK Tatran Prachatice
- Founded: 1931; 94 years ago
- Ground: Městský stadion Prachatice
- Capacity: 1,500
- League: 5. Liga (Jihočeský kraj)
- 2022–23: 16th

FK Tatran Prachatice is a football club located in Prachatice, Czech Republic. The club played two seasons in the Czech 2. Liga. It currently plays in the South Bohemian Championship (Czech: Jihočeský přebor), which is in the fifth tier of the Czech football system.

== Previous seasons ==
- 2001/02: ČFL 2nd
- 2002/03: ČFL 1st (promoted)
- 2003/04: 2.Liga 13th
- 2004/05: 2.Liga 15th (relegated)
- 2005/06: ČFL 7th
- 2006/07: ČFL 11th (relegated)
- 2007/08: Divize A 8th
- 2008/09: Divize A 3rd (relegated)
- 2009/10: 5. liga (Jihočeský kraj) 7th
- 2010/11: 5. liga (Jihočeský kraj) 9th
- 2011/12: 5. liga (Jihočeský kraj) 11th
- 2012/13: 5. liga (Jihočeský kraj) 2nd
- 2013/14: 5. liga (Jihočeský kraj) 12th
- 2014/15: 5. liga (Jihočeský kraj) 6th
- 2015/16: 5. liga (Jihočeský kraj) 15th (relegated)
- 2016/17: 1.A třída (Jihočeský kraj) 4th
- 2017/18: 1.A třída (Jihočeský kraj) 9th
- 2019/20: 1.A třída (Jihočeský kraj) 5th (cancelled)
- 2020/21: 1.A třída (Jihočeský kraj) 11th (cancelled and promoted)
- 2021/22: 5. liga (Jihočeský kraj) 4th

== Notable former players ==
Luboš Pecka

David Horejš

Milan Nitrianský

== Honours ==
- Bohemian Football League (third tier)
  - Champions 2002–03
