= SC Xaverov =

- Full name: SC Xaverov Horní Počernice, z.s.
- Founded: 1920
- Ground: Na Chvalech; Prague 9 – Horní Počernice
- Capacity: 3,400
- League: 1. A třída skupina A - Praha
- 2025–26: 5th
- Website: https://www.scxaverov.cz/

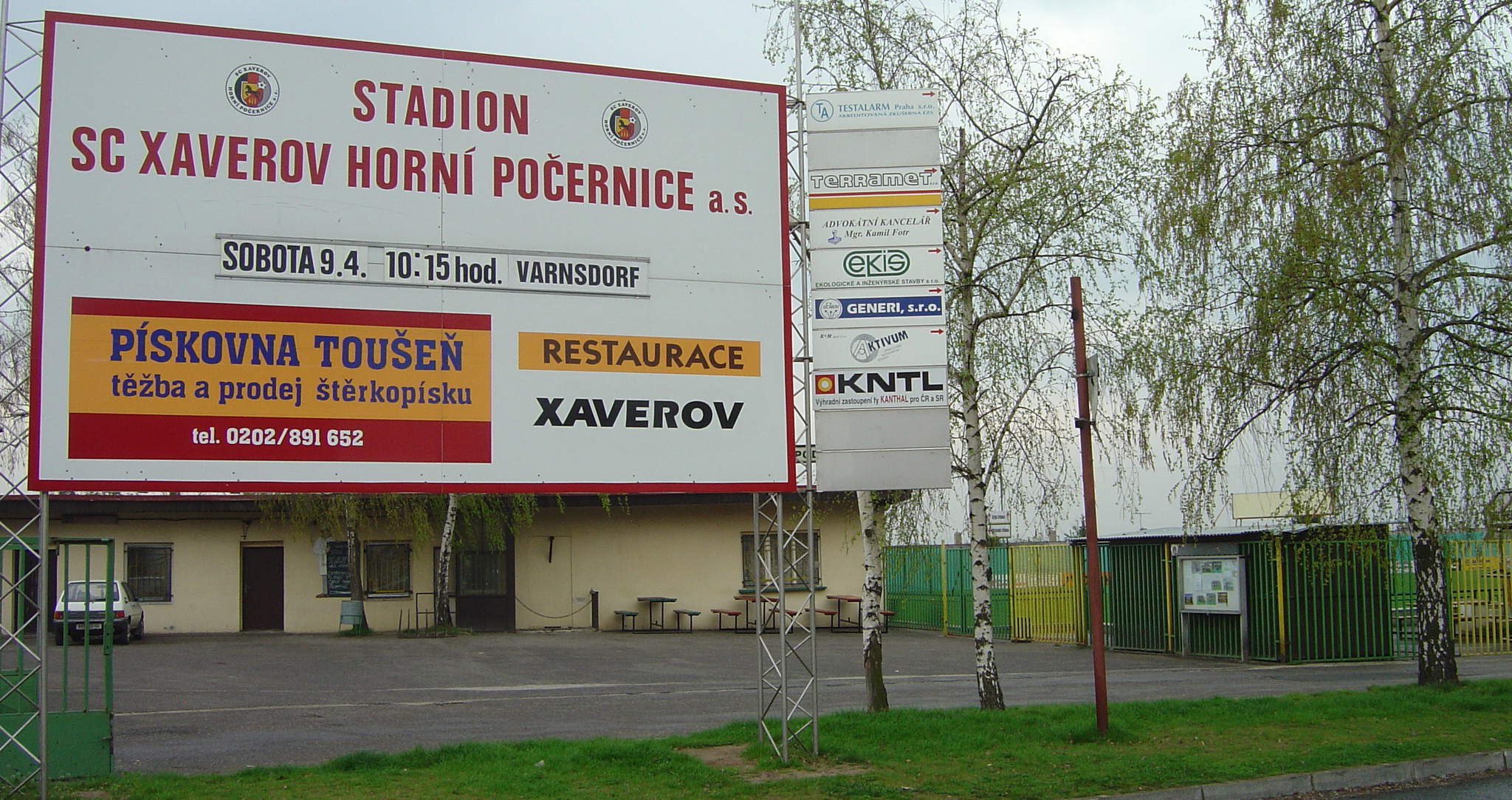
Gates of the club's stadium in 2005

SC Xaverov Horní Počernice is a football club based in Prague-Horní Počernice, Czech Republic. Formed in 1920 by a merger of Slavoj Horní Počernice and Slovan Horní Počernice as TJ Xaverov Horní Počernice, they played in the Czech 2. Liga until 2004 before being relegated to the Bohemian Football League (ČFL), the third tier of Czech football. They were promoted back to the 2. Liga for the 2005/2006 season after finishing first in the ČFL. The 2005/06 season saw them finish in 7th place in the 2. Liga, a safe mid-table position. However, because of dire financial straits the club was forced to sell its license to play in the league to Bohemians 1905, essentially spelling an end for the club in higher competitions.

After only fielding junior teams in the 2006–07 and 2007–08 seasons, SC Xaverov featured in Prague's local district league, Pražská II. třída, in the 8th tier of Czech League football for the 2008–09 season. As of 2022, the team played in the 6th tier of Czech football.

== Former players ==
- Martin Frýdek
- Pavel Novotný
- Jan Rajnoch
- Štěpán Vachoušek
- Jan Vorel
- Vít Turtenwald
