= 2009–10 FK Teplice season =

Teplice
2009–10 season
- Manager: Jiří Plíšek
- Stadium: Na Stínadlech
- Czech First League: 4th
- Czech Cup: Quarter-finals
- UEFA Europa League: Play-off round
- Top goalscorer: League: Aidin Mahmutović (7)
- Average home league attendance: 5,307
- Biggest win: 5–0 v Kladno (Home, 1 May 2010, Czech First League)
- Biggest defeat: 2–6 v Sigma Olomouc (Away, 23 November 2009, Czech First League)

The 2009–10 season was Fotbalový klub Teplice's 14th consecutive season in the Czech First League. In addition to the domestic league, Teplice participated in that season's editions of the Czech Cup and the UEFA Europa League.

== Squad ==
Squad at end of season

Note: Flags indicate national team as defined under FIFA eligibility rules; some limited exceptions apply. Players may hold more than one non-FIFA nationality.

No.	Pos.	Nation	Player
1	GK	CZE	Martin Slavík
2	DF	SVK	Matej Siva
3	DF	CZE	David Jablonský
4	DF	CZE	Martin Klein
5	MF	BIH	Admir Ljevaković
6	DF	CZE	Vlastimil Vidlička
7	MF	SVK	Michal Gašparík
8	MF	CZE	Štěpán Vachoušek
9	MF	CZE	Pavel Verbíř
10	MF	CZE	Vlastimil Stožický
11	MF	CZE	Lukáš Zoubele
12	DF	CZE	Michal Doležal
14	DF	CZE	Ladislav Beran

No.	Pos.	Nation	Player
15	DF	CZE	Petr Lukáš
16	FW	CZE	Ivan Šollar
17	FW	CZE	Tomáš Vondrášek
18	FW	CZE	Libor Došek
19	MF	CZE	Jakub Mareš
20	DF	CZE	Milan Matula
21	GK	CZE	Petr Pechatý
22	DF	CZE	Antonín Rosa
23	FW	EGY	Osama Elsamni
24	FW	CZE	Richard Veverka
25	FW	BIH	Aidin Mahmutović
27	MF	CZE	David Kalivoda
30	GK	CZE	Tomáš Grigar

== Competitions ==
=== Overview ===
Competition	First match	Last match	Starting round	Final position	Record							
Competition	First match	Last match	Starting round	Final position	Pld	W	D	L	GF	GA	GD	Win %
Czech First League	24 July 2009	15 May 2010	Matchday 1	4th	30	15	10	5	44	25	+19	50.00
Czech Cup	3 September 2009	8 April 2010	Second round	Quarter-finals	6	4	1	1	12	7	+5	66.67
UEFA Europa League	20 August 2009	27 August 2009	Play-off round	Play-off round	2	0	1	1	2	3	−1	0.00
Total					38	19	12	7	58	35	+23	50.00

Source: Competitions

=== Czech First League ===
==== League table ====
Pos	Team	Pld	W	D	L	GF	GA	GD	Pts	Qualification or relegation
2	Jablonec	30	18	7	5	42	24	+18	61	Qualification for Europa League third qualifying round
3	Baník Ostrava	30	17	9	4	47	25	+22	60	Qualification for Europa League second qualifying round
4	Teplice	30	15	10	5	44	25	+19	55	
5	Viktoria Plzeň	30	12	12	6	42	33	+9	48	Qualification for Europa League third qualifying round (Note: Viktoria Plzeň won the 2009–10 Czech Cup and qualified for the third qualifying round of the UEFA Europa League.)
6	Sigma Olomouc	30	14	5	11	49	36	+13	47	

Source: Fortuna liga
Rules for classification: 1) points; 2) goal difference; 3) number of goals scored.

==== Results summary ====
Overall								Home						Away					
Pld	W	D	L	GF	GA	GD	Pts	W	D	L	GF	GA	GD	W	D	L	GF	GA	GD
30	15	10	5	44	25	+19	55	9	4	2	23	9	+14	6	6	3	21	16	+5

Source: Competitions

==== Results by round ====
Round	1	2	3	4	5	6	7	8	9	10	11	12	13	14	15	16	17	18	19	20	21	22	23	24	25	26	27	28	29	30
Ground	H	A	H	A	H	A	A	H	A	H	A	H	A	H	A	H	A	H	A	H	H	A	H	A	H	A	H	A	H	A
Result	D	D	W	W	D	W	W	W	D	W	W	D	W	W	L	W	D	W	D	L	W	D	L	L	W	W	W	D	D	L
Position	10	9	5	4	4	2	1	1	2	2	1	1	1	1	1	1	1	1	1	2	2	2	3	4	4	4	4	4	4	4
Points	1	2	5	8	9	12	15	18	19	22	25	26	29	32	32	35	36	39	40	40	43	44	44	44	47	50	53	54	55	55

Source: Matches
A = Away; H = Home; W = Win; D = Draw; L = Loss

==== Matches ====
24 July 2009 1	Teplice	0–0	Sparta Prague	Teplice
	Ljevaković (yellow card) 14'; Vachoušek (yellow card) 65'	Report		Stadium: Na Stínadlech; Attendance: 15,120; Referee: Pavel Královec; Assistant referees: Ivo Chytil, Petr Vysloužil

1 August 2009 2	Viktoria Plzeň	2–2	Teplice	Plzeň
	Jiráček 2'; Lecjaks 11'; Hájovský (yellow card) 36'; Rýdel (yellow card) 73'; Limberský (yellow card) 78'	Report	Vachoušek 8'; Lukáš (yellow card) 20'; Stožický (yellow card) 61'; Matula (yellow card) 71'; Vidlička 74'	Stadium: Stadion města Plzně; Attendance: 4,085; Referee: Milan Makovička; Assistant referees: Emil Ubias, Václav Štěrba

9 August 2009 3	Teplice	3–0	Dynamo České Budějovice	Teplice
	Stožický 4'; Mahmutović 22'; Vidlička 79'; Ljevaković (yellow card) 86'	Report	Mezlík (yellow card) 58'; Leština (yellow card) 65'	Stadium: Na Stínadlech; Attendance: 3,956; Referee: Radek Příhoda; Assistant referees: Martin Večeřa, Ondřej Pelikán

16 August 2009 4	Bohemians Prague (Střížkov)	1–3	Teplice	Prague
	Obermajer (yellow card) 7' (red card) 32'; Kincl 28', (yellow card) 32'	Report	Vondrášek (yellow card) 24'; Mareš 29'; Ljevaković (yellow card) 45'; Kincl 68' (o.g.); Vachoušek (yellow card) 85'; Verbíř 89'	Stadium: Stadion Evžena Rošického; Attendance: 757; Referee: Jiří Adam; Assistant referees: Libor Novák, Andreas Drastik

23 August 2009 5	Teplice	1–1	Slavia Prague	Teplice
	Stožický 17'; Hesek (yellow card) 75'; Ljevaković (yellow card) 77'	Report	Černý 41'; Janda (yellow card) 69'; Čelůstka (yellow card) 76'; Vasiljević (yellow card) 89'	Stadium: Na Stínadlech; Attendance: 10,690; Referee: Jiří Jech; Assistant referees: Patrik Filípek, Ivan Teuber

31 August 2009 6	Brno	2–3	Teplice	Brno
	Došek 27'; Mareček (yellow card) 65'; Rabušic 90'	Report	Merzić 38'; Mahmutović (yellow card) 44', (goal) 63'; Vidlička (yellow card) 78'; Mareš 89'	Stadium: Městský fotbalový stadion Srbská; Attendance: 6,454; Referee: Roman Hrubeš; Assistant referees: Martin Wilczek, Josef Košec

13 September 2009 7	Slovácko	0–2	Teplice	Uherské Hradiště
	Kordula (yellow card) 55'; Randa (yellow card) 72'	Report	Vondrášek 4'; Klein (yellow card) 29'; Mahmutović 90'	Stadium: Městský fotbalový stadion Miroslava Valenty; Attendance: 5,425; Referee: Jan Jílek; Assistant referees: Petr Hojsík, Jiří Jiřík

20 September 2009 8	Teplice	1–0	Bohemians 1905	Teplice
	Mareš (yellow card) 19'; Smejkal 78'	Report	Rychlík (yellow card) 26' (red card) 57'; Cseh (yellow card) 51'	Stadium: Na Stínadlech; Attendance: 5,120; Referee: Radek Matějek; Assistant referees: Roman Tacina, Libor Kovařík

20 September 2009 9	Baník Ostrava	2–2	Teplice	Ostrava
	Strnad 1'; Lička (yellow card) 39', (goal) 48'; Mičola (yellow card) 73'	Report	Vachoušek 3', (yellow card) 51'; Mareš (yellow card) 30'; Kalivoda 68'; Elsamni (yellow card) 70'; Mahmutović (yellow card) 81'	Stadium: Bazaly; Attendance: 6,456; Referee: Radek Příhoda; Assistant referees: Petr Vysloužil, Ivan Teuber

3 October 2009 10	Teplice	2–0	Slovan Liberec	Teplice
	Vidlička 9'; Mahmutović 45'; Klein (yellow card) 45'; Lukáš (yellow card) 67'	Report	Bosančić (yellow card) 23'; Papoušek (yellow card) 87'	Stadium: Na Stínadlech; Attendance: 3,056; Referee: Libor Kovařík; Assistant referees: Josef Košec, Jaroslav Moudrý

17 October 2009 11	Příbram	0–3	Teplice	Příbram
	Videgla (yellow card) 90'	Report	Klein (yellow card) 2'; Vachoušek (yellow card) 23'; Mareš 34', 60'; Verbíř 83'	Stadium: Na Litavce; Attendance: 1,830; Referee: Jiří Adam; Assistant referees: Ivo Chytil, Petr Slavík

24 October 2009 12	Teplice	2–2	Mladá Boleslav	Teplice
	Miller 22' (o.g.); Verbíř (yellow card) 40'; Stožický 67'; Mareš (red card) 71'	Report	Sylvestre 19'; Chramosta 23'; Janíček (yellow card) 29'	Stadium: Na Stínadlech; Attendance: 3,515; Referee: Miroslav Zelinka; Assistant referees: Kryštof Mencl, Martin Večeřa

1 November 2009 13	Kladno	0–2	Teplice	Kladno
	Šilhan (yellow card) 75'; Gross (yellow card) 82'; Procházka (yellow card) 82'	Report	Vondrášek 74'; Rosa (yellow card) 88'; Kalivoda 90'	Stadium: Stadion Františka Kloze; Attendance: 1,845; Referee: Radek Kocián; Assistant referees: Petr Čecháček, Petr Vysloužil

7 November 2009 14	Teplice	1–0	Jablonec	Teplice
	Lukáš (yellow card) 32'; Špit 48' (o.g.)	Report	Krejčí (yellow card) 26'	Stadium: Na Stínadlech; Attendance: 6,085; Referee: Jan Jílek; Assistant referees: Patrik Filípek, Petr Hojsík

23 November 2009 15	Sigma Olomouc	6–2	Teplice	Olomouc
	Šultes 24'; Ordoš 27', 74'; Rossi (yellow card) 47'; Dreksa 52', 81'; Škerle (yellow card) 58'; Janotka 87' (pen.)	Report	Mahmutović 43'; Klein 59'; Lukáš (yellow card) 62'	Stadium: Andrův stadion Attendance: 3,762; Referee: Michal Paták; Assistant referees: Antonín Kordula, Dušan Pospíšil

28 February 2010 17	Dynamo České Budějovice	0–0	Teplice	České Budějovice
	Volešák (yellow card) 59'	Report	Vachoušek (yellow card) 89'; Stožický (yellow card) 90'	Stadium: Stadion Střelecký ostrov Attendance: 2,883; Referee: Jiří Adam; Assistant referees: Robert Kubáň, Ivan Teuber

6 March 2010 18	Teplice	2–1	Bohemians Prague (Střížkov)	Teplice
	Vidlička (yellow card) 39'; Verbíř (yellow card) 49'; Došek 52'; Zoubele (yellow card) 57'; Stožický 69'; Matula (yellow card) 90'	Report	Mach (yellow card) 25'; Ibe 44'; Macháček (yellow card) 85'	Stadium: Na Stínadlech; Attendance: 2,012; Referee: Libor Kovařík; Assistant referees: Václav Štěrba, Michal Urban

10 March 2010 16	Teplice	2–1	Viktoria Plzeň	Teplice
	Siva 10'; Mahmutović 51'; Vidlička (yellow card) 65'	Report	Limberský (yellow card) 62' (red card) 72'; Bakoš 65'; Rada (yellow card) 90'	Stadium: Na Stínadlech; Attendance: 3,008; Referee: Radek Matějek; Assistant referees: Ivo Chytil, Kryštof Mencl

13 March 2010 19	Slavia Prague	0–0	Teplice	Prague
	Černý (yellow card) 80'	Report	Matula (yellow card) 28'; Ljevaković (yellow card) 50'; Siva (yellow card) 58'; Stožický (yellow card) 80'; Vachoušek (yellow card) 90'	Stadium: Synot Tip Arena; Attendance: 8,701; Referee: Miroslav Zelinka; Assistant referees: Petr Hojsík, Emanuel Marek

20 March 2010 20	Teplice	0–1	Brno	Teplice
		Report	Jílek 85'	Stadium: Na Stínadlech; Attendance: 4,890; Referee: Jiří Jech; Assistant referees: Emil Ubias, Jiří Jiřík

25 March 2010 21	Teplice	2–1	Slovácko	Teplice
	Němčický 82' (o.g.); Došek 90'	Report	Kuncl (yellow card) 10'; Kordula (yellow card) 12'; Filipko (yellow card) 24'; Fujerik 79'; Němčický (yellow card) 90'	Stadium: Na Stínadlech; Attendance: 4,480; Referee: Karel Hrubeš; Assistant referees: Patrik Filípek, Petr Vysloužil

28 March 2010 22	Bohemians 1905	1–1	Teplice	Prague
	Lukáš (yellow card) 41'; Kaufman (yellow card) 53'; Róth (yellow card) 55'; Nikl (yellow card) 70'; Rosa 73' (o.g.)	Report	Vondrášek 37'; Ljevaković (yellow card) 58'; Vidlička (yellow card) 87'	Stadium: Ďolíček; Attendance: 6,903; Referee: Tomáš Kocourek; Assistant referees: Petr Čecháček, Drahoslav Handlíř

5 April 2010 23	Teplice	0–1	Baník Ostrava	Teplice
	Mahmutović (yellow card) 41'; Došek (yellow card) 87'; Ljevaković (yellow card) 89'	Report	Vydra 25'; Mičola (yellow card) 47'; Baránek (yellow card) 79'; Marek (yellow card) 90'	Stadium: Na Stínadlech; Attendance: 6,783; Referee: Radek Příhoda; Assistant referees: Luděk Lhoták, Petr Hojsík

11 April 2010 24	Slovan Liberec	1–0	Teplice	Liberec
	Dočkal 44' (pen.); Vácha (yellow card) 53'; Papoušek (yellow card) 54'; Holeňák (yellow card) 87'; Vojta (yellow card) 90'	Report	Stožický (yellow card) 42'; Lukáš (yellow card) 43'; Rosa (yellow card) 90'	Stadium: Stadion u Nisy; Attendance: 3,728; Referee: Petr Mikel; Assistant referees: Petr Slavík, Roman Tacina

18 April 2010 25	Teplice	1–0	Příbram	Teplice
	Mahmutović 31'; Zoubele (yellow card) 59'; Kalivoda (yellow card) 75'; Verbíř (yellow card) 90'	Report	Klesa (yellow card) 66'; Rodrigues (yellow card) 73'; Pilík (yellow card) 77'; Šmejkal (yellow card) 87'	Stadium: Na Stínadlech; Attendance: 3,301; Referee: Jaroslav Bílek; Assistant referees: Drahoslav Handlíř, Robert Kubáň

25 April 2010 26	Mladá Boleslav	0–1	Teplice	Mladá Boleslav
	Janíček (yellow card) 60'; Procházka (yellow card) 85'	Report	Ljevaković (yellow card) 33'; Lukáš (yellow card) 55'; Vachoušek 61' (pen.)	Stadium: Městský stadion Attendance: 4,215; Referee: Drahoslav Drábek; Assistant referees: Antonín Kordula, Zdeněk Dobrovolný

1 May 2010 27	Teplice	5–0	Kladno	Teplice
	Rosa 32'; Stožický 40'; Vachoušek 42', 51'; Kalivoda 83'	Report		Stadium: Na Stínadlech; Attendance: 3,648; Referee: Radek Matějek; Assistant referees: Martin Večeřa, Pavel Peřina

5 May 2010 28	Jablonec	0–0	Teplice	Jablonec nad Nisou
		Report	Vachoušek (yellow card) 39'; Mahmutović (yellow card) 66'; Verbíř (yellow card) 71'; Došek (yellow card) 90'; Vidlička (yellow card) 90' (red card) 90'	Stadium: Stadion Střelnice; Attendance: 3,863; Referee: Libor Kovařík; Assistant referees: Patrik Filípek, Petr Hojsík

8 May 2010 29	Teplice	1–1	Sigma Olomouc	Teplice
	Vachoušek 44' (pen.); Došek (yellow card) 81'	Report	Bajer (yellow card) 27'; Škerle (yellow card) 29' (red card) 43'; Navrátil 30'	Stadium: Na Stínadlech; Attendance: 3,940; Referee: Petr Mikel; Assistant referees: Kryštof Mencl, Ivan Teuber

15 May 2010 30	Sparta Prague	1–0	Teplice	Prague
	Řepka 47'	Report	Stožický (yellow card) 11'; Lukáš (yellow card) 43'; Mareš (yellow card) 73'	Stadium: Generali Arena; Attendance: 19,215; Referee: Michal Paták; Assistant referees: Miroslav Zlámal, Jiří Jiřík

=== Czech Cup ===
3 September 2009 Second round	Ústí nad Labem	1–4	Teplice	Ústí nad Labem
		Report		Stadium: Městský stadion

23 September 2009 Third round	Hlučín	1–3	Teplice	Hlučín
		Report		Stadium: Městský stadion

==== Fourth round ====
7 October 2009 First leg	Hradec Králové	1–2	Teplice	Hradec Králové
		Report		Stadium: Všesportovní stadion

11 November 2009 Second leg	Teplice	2–1 (4–2 agg.)	Hradec Králové	Teplice
		Report		Stadium: Na Stínadlech
Note: Teplice won 4–2 on aggregate.

==== Quarter-finals ====
31 March 2010 First leg	Teplice	1–3	Jablonec	Teplice
	Vondrášek 32'; Došek (yellow card) 73'	Report	Zábojník (yellow card) 19'; Jarolím 22'; Krejčí 31'; Lafata 40'; Frydrych (yellow card) 85'	Stadium: Na Stínadlech

8 April 2010 Second leg	Jablonec	0–0 (3–1 agg.)	Teplice	Jablonec nad Nisou
		Report		Stadium: Stadion Střelnice
Note: Jablonec won 3–1 on aggregate.

=== UEFA Europa League ===
==== Play-off round ====
20 August 2009 First leg	Teplice (Czech Republic)	1–2	(Israel) Hapoel Tel Aviv	Teplice, Czech Republic
18:00 CEST (UTC+2)	Vidlička (yellow card) 30'; Vondrášek 89'	Report	Yadin (yellow card) 37'; Zandberg (yellow card) 41'; Enyeama (yellow card) 66', (goal) 74' (pen.); Vermouth 90+4'	Stadium: Na Stínadlech; Attendance: 5,122; Referee: Espen Berntsen (Norway); Assistant referees: Erik Ræstad (Norway), Odd-Jarle Larsen (Norway); Fourth official: Kristoffer Helgerud (Norway)

27 August 2009 Second leg	Hapoel Tel Aviv (Israel)	1–1 (3–2 agg.)	(Czech Republic) Teplice	Tel Aviv, Israel
19:00 IDT (UTC+3)	Bondar (yellow card) 57'; Shechter (yellow card) 67'; Ben Dayan 90+1'	Report	Ljevaković (yellow card) 70'; Vachoušek (yellow card) 73'; Klein 89'; Lukáš (yellow card) 90+2'	Stadium: Bloomfield Stadium; Attendance: 7,269; Referee: Stanislav Sukhina (Russia); Assistant referees: Vladislav Khodeev (Russia), Mikhail Erovenko (Russia); Fourth official: Vladimir Pettay (Russia)
Note: Hapoel Tel Aviv won 3–2 on aggregate.
