= FK Teplice in European football =

- Club: Teplice
- First entry: 1971–72 UEFA Cup
- Latest entry: 2009–10 UEFA Europa League

FK Teplice is an association football club from Teplice, Czech Republic. The team has participated in nine seasons of Union of European Football Associations (UEFA) club competitions, including one season in the Champions League, five seasons in the UEFA Cup and Europa League and four seasons in the Intertoto Cup. It has played 34 UEFA games, resulting in 11 wins, 4 draws and 19 defeats. The club's first appearance was in the 1971–72 UEFA Cup. The club's best performance is reaching the third round of the UEFA Cup, which they managed in the 2003–04 season.

The club plays its home matches at Na Stínadlech, an all-seater stadium in Teplice. The ground can host 18,221 spectators and was opened in 1973, replacing club's old ground U drožďárny as a home venue. The club's biggest win in European competition is the 5–1 defeat of Santa Clara in the 2002 UEFA Intertoto Cup, while its heaviest defeat is also by a 5–1 scoreline, having lost to Bologna in the same competition. Pavel Verbíř has appeared in the most UEFA matches for Teplice, with 31 games to his name. He is also the leading scorer with 4 goals.

== Key ==
- S = Seasons
- P = Played
- W = Games won
- D = Games drawn
- L = Games lost
- F = Goals for
- A = Goals against
- aet = Match determined after extra time
- ag = Match determined by away goals rule
- SF = Semi-finals
- QF = Quarter-finals
- Group = Group stage
- Group 2 = Second group stage
- PO = Play-off round
- R3 = Round 3
- R2 = Round 2
- R1 = Round 1
- Q3 = Third qualification round
- Q2 = Second qualification round
- Q1 = First qualification round
- Q = Qualification round

== All-time statistics ==
The following is a list of the all-time statistics from Teplice's games in the three UEFA tournaments it has participated in, as well as the overall total. The list contains the tournament, the number of seasons (S), games played (P), won (W), drawn (D) and lost (L), as well as goals for (GF), goals against (GA) and goal difference (GD). The statistics include qualification matches and is up to date as of the 2013–14 season.

| Competition | S | P | W | D | L | GF | GA | GD |
|---|---|---|---|---|---|---|---|---|
| Champions League | 1 | 2 | 0 | 0 | 2 | 0 | 2 | –2 |
| Europa League / UEFA Cup | 5 | 18 | 6 | 4 | 8 | 19 | 25 | –7 |
| Intertoto Cup | 4 | 14 | 5 | 0 | 9 | 23 | 25 | –2 |
| Total | 9 | 34 | 11 | 4 | 19 | 42 | 52 | –10 |

=== Matches ===
The following is a complete list of matches played by Teplice in UEFA tournaments. It includes the season, tournament, the stage, the opponent club and its country, the date, the venue and the score, with Teplice's score noted first. It is up to date as of the end of 30 June 2014.

List of FK Teplice matches in European football
| Season | Tournament | Stage | Opponent | | Date | Venue | Score | Ref |
| Season | Tournament | Stage | Team | Country | Date | Venue | Score | Ref |
|---|---|---|---|---|---|---|---|---|
| 1971–72 | UEFA Cup | R1 | Zagłębie Wałbrzych | Poland | 15 September 1971 | Stadion Tysiąclecia, Wałbrzych | 0–1 | |
| 1971–72 | UEFA Cup | R1 | Zagłębie Wałbrzych | Poland | 29 September 1971 | U drožďárny, Teplice | 2–3 | |
| 1999–00 | Champions League | Q3 | Borussia Dortmund | Germany | 11 August 1999 | Na Stínadlech, Teplice | 0–1 | |
| 1999–00 | Champions League | Q3 | Borussia Dortmund | Germany | 25 August 1999 | Westfalenstadion, Dortmund | 0–1 | |
| 1999–00 | UEFA Cup | R1 | Ferencvárosi TC | Hungary | 16 September 1999 | Na Stínadlech, Teplice | 3–1 | |
| 1999–00 | UEFA Cup | R1 | Ferencvárosi TC | Hungary | 30 September 1999 | Stadion Albert Flórián, Budapest | 1–1 | |
| 1999–00 | UEFA Cup | R2 | Mallorca | Spain | 21 October 1999 | Na Stínadlech, Teplice | 1–2 | |
| 1999–00 | UEFA Cup | R2 | Mallorca | Spain | 4 November 1999 | Son Moix, Palma | 0–3 | |
| 2002–03 | Intertoto Cup | R2 | Santa Clara | Portugal | 6 July 2002 | Na Stínadlech, Teplice | 5–1 | |
| 2002–03 | Intertoto Cup | R2 | Santa Clara | Portugal | 13 July 2002 | Estádio de São Miguel, Ponta Delgada | 4–1 | |
| 2002–03 | Intertoto Cup | R3 | Kaiserslautern | Germany | 21 July 2002 | Fritz-Walter-Stadion, Kaiserslautern | 1–2 | |
| 2002–03 | Intertoto Cup | R3 | Kaiserslautern | Germany | 27 July 2002 | Na Stínadlech, Teplice | 4–0 | |
| 2002–03 | Intertoto Cup | SF | Bologna | Italy | 31 July 2002 | Stadio Renato Dall'Ara, Bologna | 1–5 | |
| 2002–03 | Intertoto Cup | SF | Bologna | Italy | 7 August 2002 | Na Stínadlech, Teplice | 1–3 | |
| 2003–04 | UEFA Cup | R1 | Kaiserslautern | Germany | 24 September 2003 | Fritz-Walter-Stadion, Kaiserslautern | 2–1 | |
| 2003–04 | UEFA Cup | R1 | Kaiserslautern | Germany | 16 October 2003 | Na Stínadlech, Teplice | 1–0 | |
| 2003–04 | UEFA Cup | R2 | Feyenoord | Netherlands | 6 November 2003 | De Kuip, Rotterdam | 2–0 | |
| 2003–04 | UEFA Cup | R2 | Feyenoord | Netherlands | 27 November 2003 | Na Stínadlech, Teplice | 0–1 | |
| 2003–04 | UEFA Cup | R3 | Celtic | Scotland | 26 February 2004 | Celtic Park, Glasgow | 0–3 | |
| 2003–04 | UEFA Cup | R3 | Celtic | Scotland | 3 March 2004 | Na Stínadlech, Teplice | 1–0 | |
| 2004–05 | Intertoto Cup | R1 | Sopron | Hungary | 19 June 2004 | Sopron | 0–1 | |
| 2004–05 | Intertoto Cup | R1 | Sopron | Hungary | 27 June 2004 | Na Stínadlech, Teplice | 3–1 | |
| 2004–05 | Intertoto Cup | R2 | Shinnik | Russia | 3 July 2004 | Shinnik Stadium, Yaroslavl | 1–2 | |
| 2004–05 | Intertoto Cup | R2 | Shinnik | Russia | 10 July 2004 | Na Stínadlech, Teplice | 0–2 | |
| 2005–06 | UEFA Cup | Q2 | Partizan Minsk | Belarus | 11 August 2005 | Traktar Stadium, Minsk | 1–1 | |
| 2005–06 | UEFA Cup | Q2 | Partizan Minsk | Belarus | 25 August 2005 | Na Stínadlech, Teplice | 2–1 | |
| 2005–06 | UEFA Cup | R1 | Espanyol | Spain | 15 September 2005 | Na Stínadlech, Teplice | 1–1 | |
| 2005–06 | UEFA Cup | R1 | Espanyol | Spain | 29 September 2005 | Estadi Olímpic de Montjuïc, Barcelona | 0–2 | |
| 2006–07 | Intertoto Cup | R2 | Grasshopper Zürich | Switzerland | 2 July 2006 | Letzigrund, Zürich | 0–2 | |
| 2006–07 | Intertoto Cup | R2 | Grasshopper Zürich | Switzerland | 9 July 2006 | Na Stínadlech, Teplice | 0–2 | |
| 2008–09 | Intertoto Cup | R2 | Honvéd | Hungary | 5 July 2008 | Na Stínadlech, Teplice | 1–3 | |
| 2008–09 | Intertoto Cup | R2 | Honvéd | Hungary | 12 July 2008 | Bozsik Stadion, Budapest | 2–0 (ag) | |
| 2009–10 | Europa League | PO | Hapoel Tel Aviv | Israel | 20 August 2009 | Na Stínadlech, Teplice | 1–2 | |
| 2009–10 | Europa League | PO | Hapoel Tel Aviv | Israel | 27 August 2009 | Bloomfield Stadium, Tel Aviv | 1–1 | |
