= Elsamni =

Elsamni is a surname. Notable people with the surname include:

- Ibrahim Elsamni, Egyptian international footballer
- Osama Elsamni (born 1988), Egyptian-Japanese footballer
