= Silhan =

Silhan is a surname. In the Czech Republic, it may be spelled as either Šilhan (feminine: Šilhanová) or Šilhán (feminine: Šilhánová). Schilhan is the German-spelling equivalent.

- Annelies Schilhan (born 1936), Austrian figure skater
- Jaromír Šilhan (born 1983), Czech footballer
- Olga Šilhánová (1920–1986), Czech gymnast
