= Mareček =

Mareček, feminine: Marečková, is a Czech surname. Notable people with the surname include:

- Daniel Mareček (born 1998), Czech footballer
- Eva Marečková (born 1964), Slovak gymnast
- Jonáš Mareček (born 2001), Czech biathlete
- Lukáš Mareček (born 1990), Czech footballer
- Otakar Mareček (1943–2020), Czech rower
- Vlastislav Mareček (1966–2007), Czech footballer and manager
