= 2014–15 Czech First League =

22nd season of top-tier football league in Czech Republic

Czech First League
- Season: 2014–15
- Champions: FC Viktoria Plzeň
- Relegated: FC Hradec Králové; SK Dynamo České Budějovice
- Champions League: FC Viktoria Plzeň; AC Sparta Prague
- Europa League: FK Baumit Jablonec; FK Mladá Boleslav
- Matches: 240
- Goals: 645 (2.69 per match)
- Top goalscorer: David Lafata (20 goals)
- Biggest home win: Liberec 6–0 Ostrava (30 August 2014); Jablonec 6–0 Dukla (3 October 2014)
- Biggest away win: Č. Budějovice 0–4 Plzeň (10 August 2014)
- Highest scoring: Plzeň 5–2 Příbram (30 May 2015)
- Highest attendance: 18,665; Sparta 0–2 Plzeň (11 April 2015)
- Lowest attendance: 734; Dukla 4–1 Příbram (28 October 2014)
- All statistics correct as of 30 May 2015.

The 2014–15 Czech First League, known as the Synot liga for sponsorship reasons, was the 22nd season of the Czech Republic's top-tier football league and the first since it was renamed from the Gambrinus liga to the Synot liga due to a change in sponsor. The season started on 25 July 2014 and ran until the end of May 2015, with a winter break between November and February. Fixtures for the season were announced on 25 June 2014. The winners were FC Viktoria Plzeň, while the previous season's champions Sparta Prague finished in second place.

== Teams ==
=== Stadia and locations ===
Locations of clubs in the 2014–15 Czech First League

Club	Location	Stadium	Capacity	2013–14 position
Baník Ostrava	Ostrava	Bazaly	10,039	10th
Bohemians 1905	Prague	Ďolíček	5,000	14th
Dukla Prague	Prague	Stadion Juliska	8,150	7th
Dynamo České Budějovice	České Budějovice	Stadion Střelecký ostrov	6,681	FNL, 1st
Hradec Králové	Hradec Králové	Všesportovní stadion	7,220	FNL, 2nd
FK Jablonec	Jablonec nad Nisou	Stadion Střelnice	6,280	11th
FK Mladá Boleslav	Mladá Boleslav	Městský stadion (Mladá Boleslav)	5,000	3rd
1. FK Příbram	Příbram	Na Litavce	9,100	12th
Slavia Prague	Prague	Eden Arena	20,800	13th
1. FC Slovácko	Uherské Hradiště	Městský fotbalový stadion Miroslava Valenty	8,121	6th
Slovan Liberec	Liberec	Stadion u Nisy	9,900	4th
Sparta Prague	Prague	Generali Arena	19,416	1st
FK Teplice	Teplice	Na Stínadlech	18,221	5th
Viktoria Plzeň	Plzeň	Stadion města Plzně	11,722	2nd
Vysočina Jihlava	Jihlava	Stadion v Jiráskově ulici	4,075	8th
Zbrojovka Brno	Brno	Městský stadion (Brno)	12,550	9th

=== Personnel and kits ===
Club	Chairman	Manager	Manufacturer	Sponsors
Baník Ostrava	(Czech Republic) Petr Šafarčík	(Czech Republic) Tomáš Bernady	Joma	Vítkovice Machinery Group
Bohemians 1905	(Czech Republic) Antonín Panenka	(Slovakia) Roman Pivarník	Adidas	REMAL
Dukla Prague	(Czech Republic) Michal Prokeš	(Czech Republic) Luboš Kozel	Adidas	Carbounion
Dynamo České Budějovice	(Czech Republic) Karel Poborský	(Czech Republic) Luboš Urban	Adidas	multiple
Hradec Králové	(Czech Republic) Richard Jukl	(Czech Republic) Bohuslav Pilný	Jako	multiple
FK Jablonec	(Czech Republic) Petr Doležal	(Czech Republic) Jaroslav Šilhavý	Nike	Baumit
FK Mladá Boleslav	(Czech Republic) Josef Dufek	(Czech Republic) Karel Jarolím	Nike	Škoda Auto
1. FK Příbram	(Czech Republic) Jaroslav Starka	(Czech Republic) Pavel Tobiáš	Adidas	Energon
Slavia Prague	(Czech Republic) Aleš Řebíček	(Czech Republic) Miroslav Beránek	Umbro	Fortuna
1. FC Slovácko	(Czech Republic) Vladimír Krejčí	(Czech Republic) Svatopluk Habanec	Kappa	multiple
Slovan Liberec	(Czech Republic) Zbyněk Štiller	(Czech Republic) David Vavruška	Nike	Preciosa
Sparta Prague	(Czech Republic) Daniel Křetínský	(Czech Republic) Vítězslav Lavička	Nike	multiple
FK Teplice	(Czech Republic) Pavel Šedlbauer	(Czech Republic) Zdeněk Ščasný	Umbro	AGC
Viktoria Plzeň	(Czech Republic) Adolf Šádek	(Czech Republic) Miroslav Koubek	Puma	Doosan Škoda Power
Vysočina Jihlava	(Czech Republic) Zdeněk Tulis	(Czech Republic) Luděk Klusáček	Adidas	PSJ
Zbrojovka Brno	(Czech Republic) Václav Bartoněk	(Czech Republic) Václav Kotal	Nike	E-Motion

=== Managerial changes ===
Team	Outgoing manager	Manner of departure	Date of vacancy	Table	Incoming manager	Date of appointment

== League table ==
Pos	Team	Pld	W	D	L	GF	GA	GD	Pts	Qualification or relegation
1	Viktoria Plzeň (C)	30	23	3	4	70	24	+46	72	Qualification for the Champions League third qualifying round
2	Sparta Prague	30	21	4	5	57	20	+37	67	Qualification for the Champions League third qualifying round
3	Jablonec	30	19	7	4	58	22	+36	64	Qualification for the Europa League third qualifying round
4	Mladá Boleslav	30	13	7	10	43	34	+9	46	Qualification for the Europa League second qualifying round
5	Příbram	30	12	7	11	40	45	−5	43	
6	Dukla Prague	30	11	8	11	34	40	−6	41	
7	Teplice	30	9	11	10	41	37	+4	38	
8	Bohemians 1905	30	10	8	12	35	41	−6	38	
9	Slovácko	30	10	7	13	43	46	−3	37	
10	Vysočina Jihlava	30	10	6	14	33	38	−5	36	
11	Slavia Prague	30	9	7	14	40	45	−5	34	
12	Slovan Liberec	30	7	12	11	39	43	−4	33 (Note: Slovan Liberec ahead of Baník Ostrava and Zbrojovka Brno on head-to-head record; Slovan Liberec 7 pts, Baník Ostrava 5 pts, Zbrojovka Brno 4 pts.)	Qualification for the Europa League third qualifying round (Note: Slovan Liberec won the 2014–15 Czech Cup and qualified for the third qualifying round of the UEFA Europa League.)
13	Baník Ostrava	30	8	9	13	23	41	−18	33	
14	Zbrojovka Brno	30	9	6	15	34	45	−11	33	
15	Hradec Králové (R)	30	6	7	17	26	52	−26	25	Relegation to FNL
16	Dynamo České Budějovice (R)	30	5	7	18	29	72	−43	22	Relegation to FNL

Source: Fortuna liga
Rules for classification: 1) Points; 2) Head-to-head points; 3) Head-to-head goal difference; 4) Head-to-head goals scored; 5) Goal difference; 6) Goals scored; 7) Play-off (only if deciding champion, UEFA competitions, or relegation); 8) Draw.
(C) Champions; (R) Relegated

== Results ==
Home \ Away	OST	B05	DUK	ČBU	HRK	JAB	MLA	PŘI	SLA	SLO	LIB	SPA	TEP	VPL	JIH	ZBR
Baník Ostrava		1–0	1–1	4–3	2–1	1–2	1–0	0–0	0–0	0–2	3–3	1–1	1–1	0–2	0–0	1–0
Bohemians 1905	0–2		0–0	3–0	1–1	1–2	1–1	3–1	2–0	1–2	2–4	1–2	1–0	3–2	0–0	0–0
Dukla Prague	0–0	0–1		3–1	1–0	1–0	0–2	0–0	2–2	0–0	3–1	1–0	5–1	2–3	4–1	1–1
Dynamo České Budějovice	1–0	2–3	1–0		2–2	0–3	2–1	0–3	1–1	2–2	1–1	1–3	2–0	0–4	1–3	1–3
Hradec Králové	1–0	1–0	2–4	2–3		0–2	0–0	2–3	0–1	2–0	0–0	0–3	0–0	2–3	0–3	2–1
Jablonec	4–0	3–0	6–0	0–0	4–0		1–0	2–0	2–1	1–1	2–0	0–0	4–2	1–2	2–0	2–0
Mladá Boleslav	1–0	1–0	0–1	4–1	2–2	1–1		4–1	2–1	2–0	1–1	2–3	3–0	0–3	3–0	5–1
Příbram	3–1	2–3	3–0	1–0	1–0	1–4	2–0		2–1	1–0	1–0	0–1	1–1	2–2	1–1	3–2
Slavia Prague	3–1	1–1	2–0	2–0	1–1	1–1	3–4	3–2		1–3	4–1	0–2	2–2	1–0	1–2	1–3
Slovácko	1–2	4–1	5–1	3–1	0–1	1–2	1–1	4–1	1–2		2–3	0–1	2–2	0–1	2–0	1–1
Slovan Liberec	6–0	1–1	0–0	5–1	2–0	0–1	0–0	0–0	1–3	2–2		2–1	0–2	1–1	2–2	1–0
Sparta Prague	0–1	1–1	3–0	4–0	3–1	2–0	1–0	4–1	2–1	5–2	1–0		1–0	0–2	3–0	4–0
Teplice	1–0	4–1	1–0	4–0	1–3	1–1	5–0	1–1	2–1	4–0	2–2	0–0		0–0	2–3	0–1
Viktoria Plzeň	2–0	2–1	2–1	6–0	4–0	3–1	1–2	5–2	1–0	4–0	2–0	2–0	1–0		2–0	4–1
Vysočina Jihlava	2–0	1–2	1–2	0–0	2–0	1–1	0–1	0–1	1–0	0–1	4–0	0–2	0–1	2–1		2–0
Zbrojovka Brno	0–0	0–1	0–1	2–2	3–0	2–3	1–0	1–0	3–0	0–1	1–0	1–3	1–1	2–3	3–2	

Source: Fortuna liga
Legend: Blue = home team win; Yellow = draw; Red = away team win.

== Top scorers ==
As of 31 May 2015

Rank	Player	Club	Goals
1	(Czech Republic) David Lafata	Sparta Prague	20
2	(Czech Republic) Milan Škoda	Slavia Prague	19
3	(Czech Republic) Libor Došek	Slovácko	16
4	(Bosnia and Herzegovina) Aidin Mahmutović	Viktoria Plzeň	12
4	(Czech Republic) Josef Šural	Slovan Liberec	12
6	(Czech Republic) Daniel Kolář	Viktoria Plzeň	11
6	(Czech Republic) Filip Novák	Jablonec	11
8	(Czech Republic) Bořek Dočkal	Sparta Prague	10
8	(Czech Republic) Tomáš Wágner	Mladá Boleslav	10
10	(Czech Republic) Jakub Řezníček	Sparta Prague	9
10	(Czech Republic) Pavel Dvořák	Hradec Králové	9
10	(Czech Republic) Václav Kadlec	Sparta Prague	9

== Attendances ==
Rank	Club	Average	Highest
1	Viktoria Plzeň	10,867	11,675
2	Sparta Praha	9,344	18,665
3	Slavia Praha	6,548	16,661
4	Teplice	4,759	10,460
5	Slovan Liberec	4,729	8,195
6	Slovácko	4,491	7,682
7	Bohemians	4,446	5,000
8	Baník Ostrava	4,414	10,340
9	Zbrojovka Brno	4,323	8,262
10	Jablonec	3,765	6,108
11	Vysočina Jihlava	3,208	4,155
12	Hradec Králové	3,182	7,100
13	Mladá Boleslav	3,094	4,823
14	České Budějovice	3,089	6,402
15	Příbram	3,052	7,062
16	Dukla Praha	2,516	6,348

== See also ==
- 2014–15 Czech Cup
- 2014–15 Czech National Football League
