= Michal Doležal =

Michal Doležal may refer to:

- Michal Doležal (footballer) (born 1977), Czech football midfielder
- Michal Doležal (ski jumper) (born 1978), Czech ski jumper
