= Milan Bokša =

Czech football manager

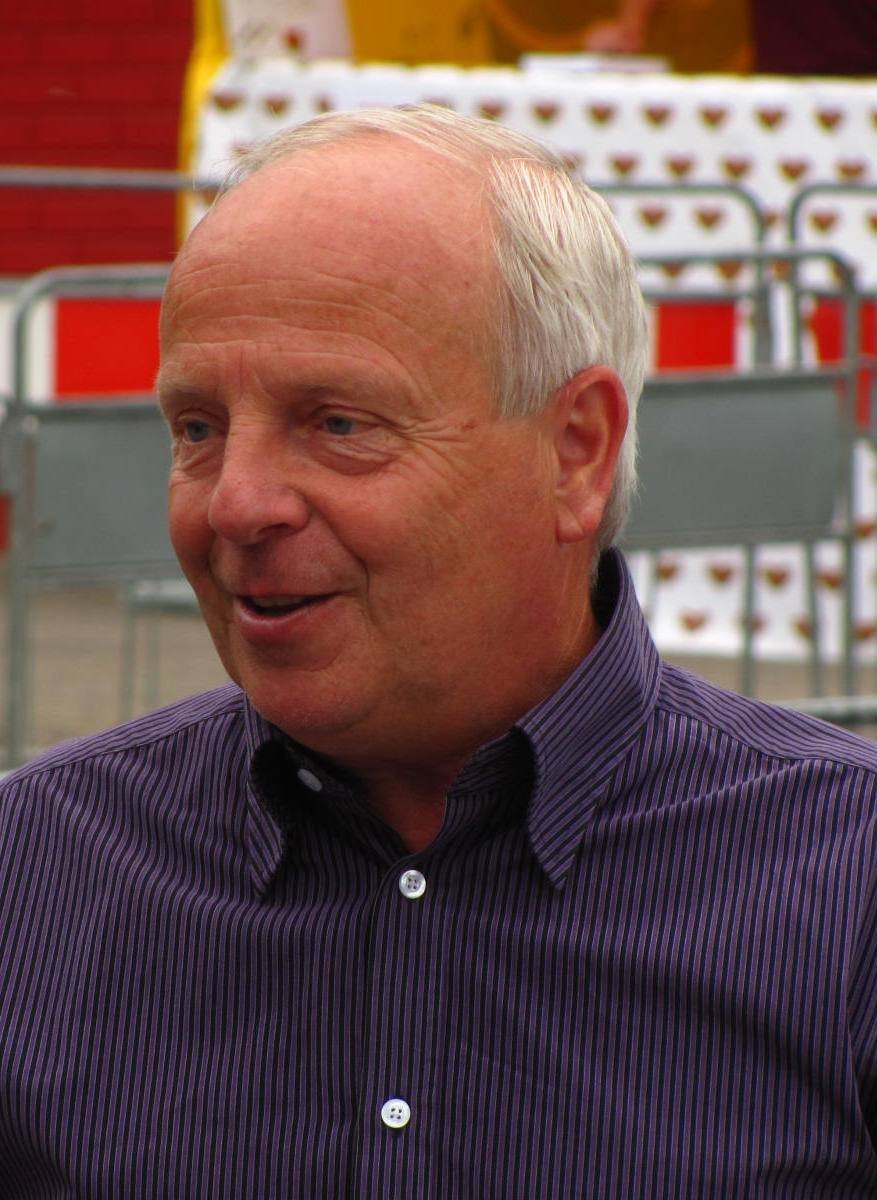
- Bokša in 2012

Personal information
- Date of birth: 3 May 1951 (age 75)
- Place of birth: Aš, Czechoslovakia

Youth career
- 1959–1965: Jiskra Aš
- 1965–1970: Škoda Plzeň

Senior career*
Years	Team	Apps	(Gls)
1970–1974	SK Břevnov		

Managerial career
- 1975–1977: Dukla Tábor B
- 1977–1980: SK Břevnov (youth)
- 1979–1980: ČSSR U-18 (assistant)
- 1981–1983: ČSSR U-21 (assistant)
- 1989–1991: Indonesian Olympic team (assistant)
- 1991–1993: VTJ Teplice
- 1993–1994: Union Cheb
- 1995–1996: FC LeRK Brno
- 1996–1997: Petra Drnovice
- 1997–1999: Sigma Olomouc
- 1999–2000: Kazma SC
- 2000: Baník Ostrava
- 2001–2002: SK České Budějovice
- 2002: 1. FC Synot
- 2004: FK Mladá Boleslav
- 2004–2006: VOŠ a SOŠ Roudnice n/L
- 2006–2007: Vysočina Jihlava
- 2007–2009: VOŠ a SOŠ Roudnice n/L
- 2015–2016: Vysočina Jihlava
- * Club domestic league appearances and goals

Milan Bokša (born 3 May 1951) is a Czech football manager.

Bokša coached numerous clubs in the Czech First League, including Union Cheb, Petra Drnovice, Sigma Olomouc, Baník Ostrava, SK České Budějovice, 1. FC Synot, FK Mladá Boleslav and Vysočina Jihlava.
