= Milan Matula =

Czech footballer (born 1984)

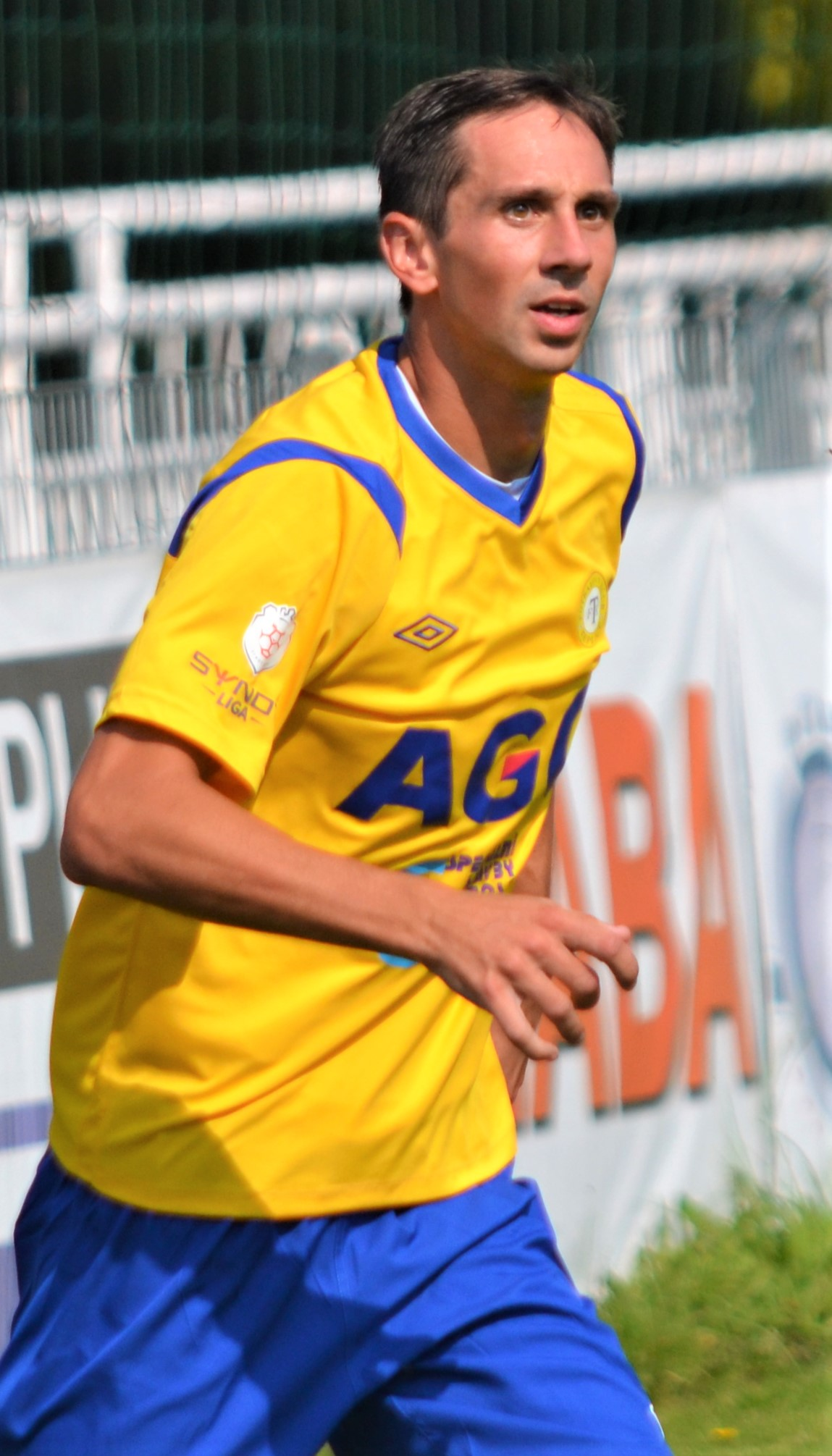

Personal information
- Date of birth: 22 April 1984 (age 42)
- Place of birth: Trutnov, Czechoslovakia
- Height: 1.85 m (6 ft 1 in)
- Position: Defender

Team information
- Current team: FC Oberlausitz Neugersdorf
- Number: 2

Youth career
- 1990–2003: FK Jablonec 97

Senior career*
| Years | Team | Apps | (Gls) |
| 2003–2008 | FC Slovan Liberec | 38 | (2) |
| 2007 | → SFC Opava (loan) | 14 | (2) |
| 2008–2016 | FK Teplice | 133 | (6) |
| 2016– | FC Oberlausitz Neugersdorf | | (-) |

International career^{‡}
| 2006–2007 | Czech Republic U21 | 3 | (0) |
- * Club domestic league appearances and goals as of 30 June 2014 ‡ National team caps and goals as of 31 December 2012

Milan Matula (born 22 April 1984 in Trutnov) is a Czech football defender currently playing for FC Oberlausitz Neugersdorf in Germany.
