= Vlastislav Mareček =

Czech footballer and coach

Personal information
- Date of birth: April 15, 1966
- Place of birth: Uherské Hradiště, Czechoslovakia
- Date of death: 2 September 2007 (aged 41)
- Place of death: Prague, Czech Republic

Youth career
- 1974–198?: TJ Kunovice

Senior career*
Years	Team	Apps	(Gls)
198?–1989	TJ Kunovice		

Managerial career
- 1989–1994: TJ Kunovice (youth)
- 1994–1995: 1. FC Synot Staré Město (youth)
- 1995–2000: Svit Zlín (youth)
- 1997–1998: Czech Republic U-16 (assistant)
- 1998–2000: Czech Republic U-18 (assistant)
- 2000–2002: Svit Zlín (assistant)
- 2000–2001: Czech Republic U-20 (assistant)
- 2002–2004: FC Tescoma Zlín
- 2002–2003: Czech Republic U-19 (assistant)
- 2004–2007: FK Teplice
- 2004–2007: Czech Republic U-21 (assistant)
- * Club domestic league appearances and goals

Vlastislav Mareček (15 April 1966 – 2 September 2007) was a Czech football coach. He was voted the best club coach of the Czech Republic in 2004/05 and 2005/06 seasons. During his career, he served as a coach of the junior national team, as well as of numerous Czech football clubs. In 2004-2006, he served as the head coach of FK Teplice, before leaving this job due to deteriorating health. In September 2007, he died of leukemia in a Prague hospital.
