= David Kalivoda =

Czech footballer

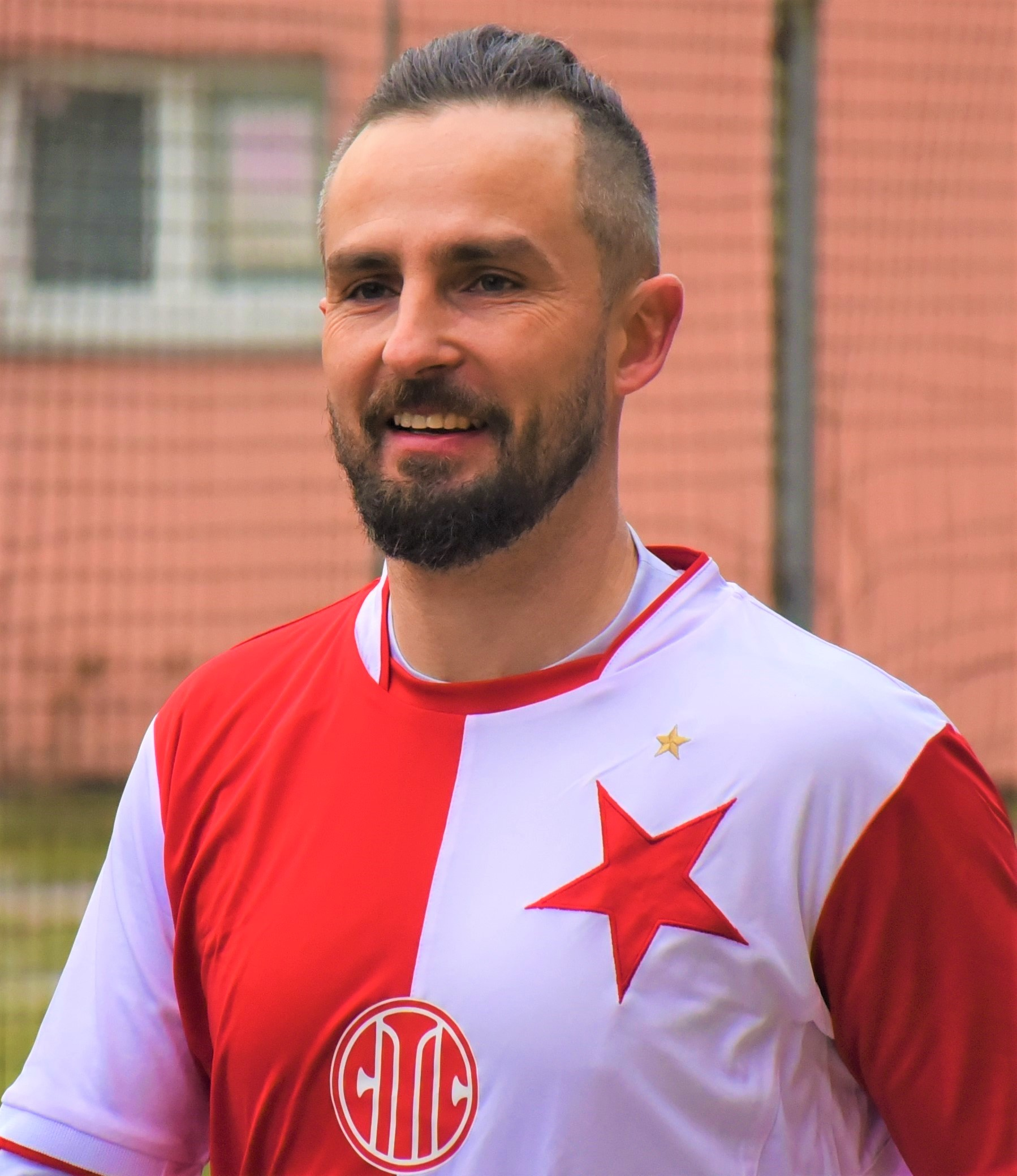
- Kalivoda in 2019

Personal information
- Date of birth: 25 August 1982 (age 44)
- Place of birth: Ledeč nad Sázavou, Czechoslovakia
- Height: 1.79 m (5 ft 10 in)
- Position: Midfielder

Youth career
- 1996–2001: SK Slavia Prague

Senior career*
Years	Team	Apps	(Gls)
2001–2008	SK Slavia Prague	74	(10)
2001–2002	→ FK Chmel Blšany (loan)	14	(0)
2005–2006	→ SC Xaverov (loan)	15	(6)
2008–2009	1. FC Brno	26	(2)
2009–2012	FK Teplice	38	(6)
2011	→ FK Viktoria Žižkov (loan)	10	(1)
2012–2013	1. FK Příbram	10	(1)
2013	FC Písek		
2013–2016	SK Zápy		
- * Club domestic league appearances and goals

David Kalivoda (born 25 August 1982) is a Czech former football player who played as a midfielder.

With SK Slavia Prague, Kalivoda won the 2007–08 Czech First League. He played three of Slavia's matches in the 2007–08 UEFA Champions League group stage, having also been the only goalscorer in the third qualifying round match against Ajax. Being an away game, Ajax fans tried to exert significant pressure to make Kalivoda miss his penalty kick.

After stepping down as a professional player, he played for and was the head coach of Královice.
