= Martin Slavík =

Czech footballer

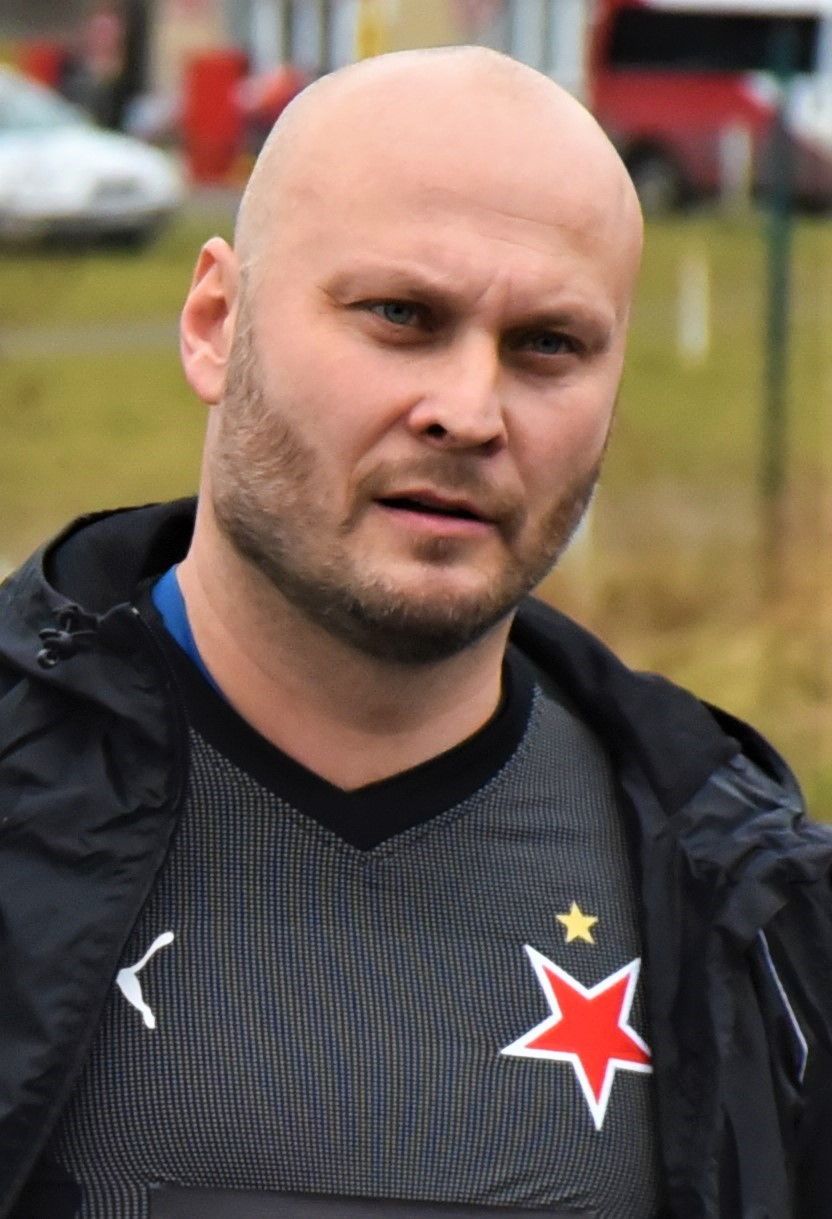

Personal information
- Date of birth: 21 September 1979 (age 47)
- Place of birth: Nový Jičín, Czechoslovakia
- Height: 1.94 m (6 ft 4 1/2 in)
- Position: Goalkeeper

Team information
- Current team: FK Teplice

Senior career*
Years	Team	Apps	(Gls)
2005–2006	Chmel Blšany	13	(0)
2006–	FK Teplice	62	(0)
2008	→ 1. FK Příbram (loan)	7	(0)
- * Club domestic league appearances and goals as of 25 July 2013

Martin Slavík (born 21 September 1979) is a Czech football goalkeeper currently playing for FK Teplice in the Czech Republic.
