= Petr Lukáš =

Czech footballer (born 1978)

Personal information
- Date of birth: 24 April 1978 (age 48)
- Place of birth: Prague, Czechoslovakia
- Height: 1.93 m (6 ft 4 in)
- Position: Defender

Youth career
- 1985–1988: Sokol Zápy
- 1988–1992: Sparta Prague
- 1992–1996: FK Mladá Boleslav

Senior career*
Years	Team	Apps	(Gls)
1996–2000	Sparta Prague		
2000	FK Jablonec 97	9	(1)
2000–2005	Slovan Liberec	93	(6)
2005–2006	Sparta Prague	22	(0)
2006–2012	FK Teplice	141	(7)
2011	→ LASK Linz (loan)	13	(0)
- * Club domestic league appearances and goals as of 31 December 2012

Petr Lukáš (born 24 April 1978) is a Czech former football defender who last played for FK Teplice in the Czech Republic. He was once the club captain. His brother Pavel is also a professional footballer.

He won the Gambrinus liga with Slovan Liberec in 2002.

In January 2011, Lukáš went on loan to LASK Linz. He marked his return to Teplice six-month later on his first match after returning, scoring the winning goal in the 4–3 opening day win over Baník Ostrava.
