= Lukáš Fujerik =

Czech footballer

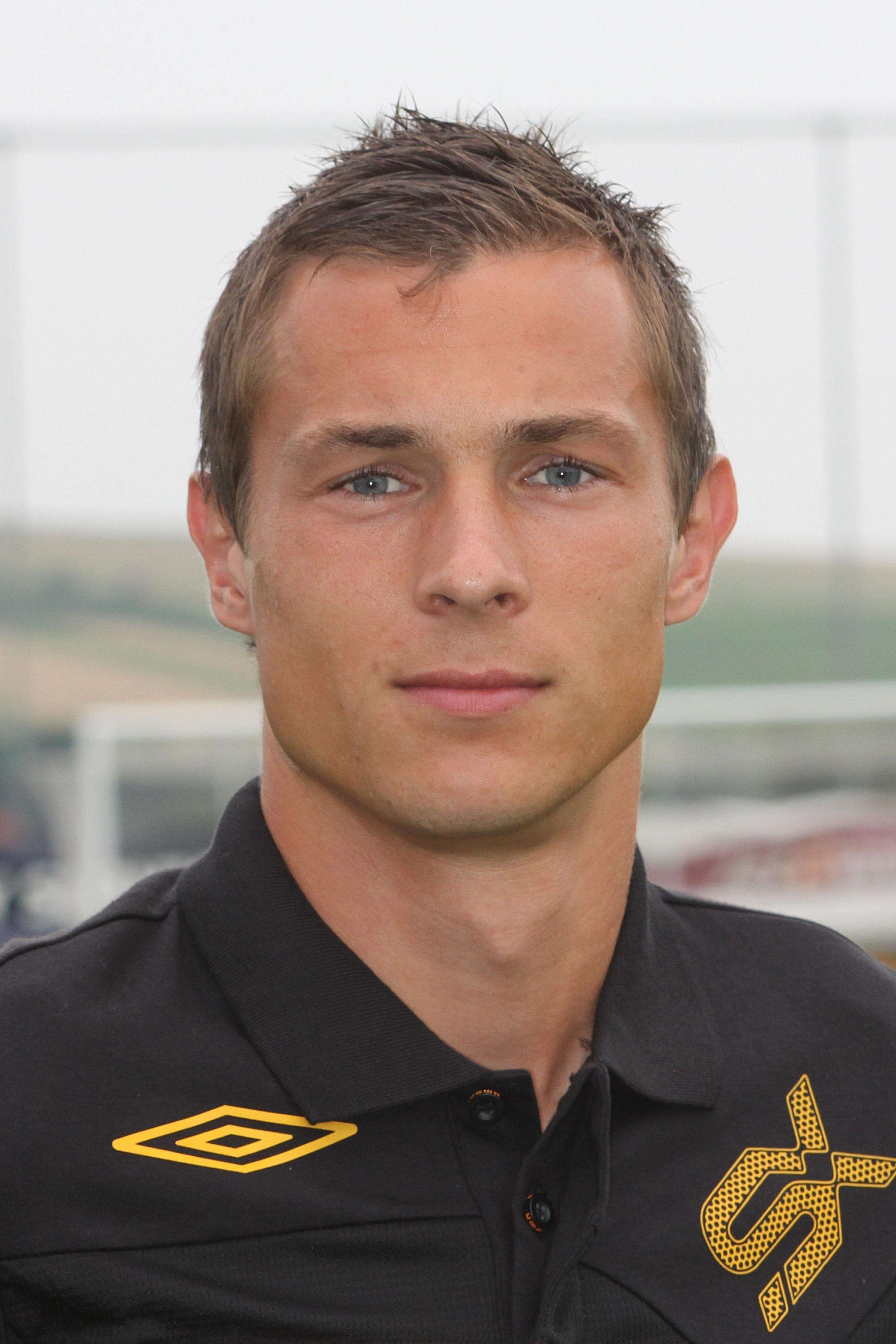

Personal information
- Date of birth: 9 December 1983 (age 42)
- Place of birth: Czechoslovakia
- Height: 1.77 m (5 ft 10 in)
- Position: Midfielder

Team information
- Current team: Slovácko
- Number: 16

Senior career*
Years	Team	Apps	(Gls)
2004–2007	Zlín	6	(0)
2005–2006	→ Vítkovice (loan)		
2008–2009	Jablonec	8	(1)
2009–	Slovácko	49	(5)
- * Club domestic league appearances and goals as of 14 October 2011

Lukáš Fujerik (born 9 December 1983) is a Czech football player who currently plays for Slovácko.
