= Vlastimil Vidlička =

Czech footballer

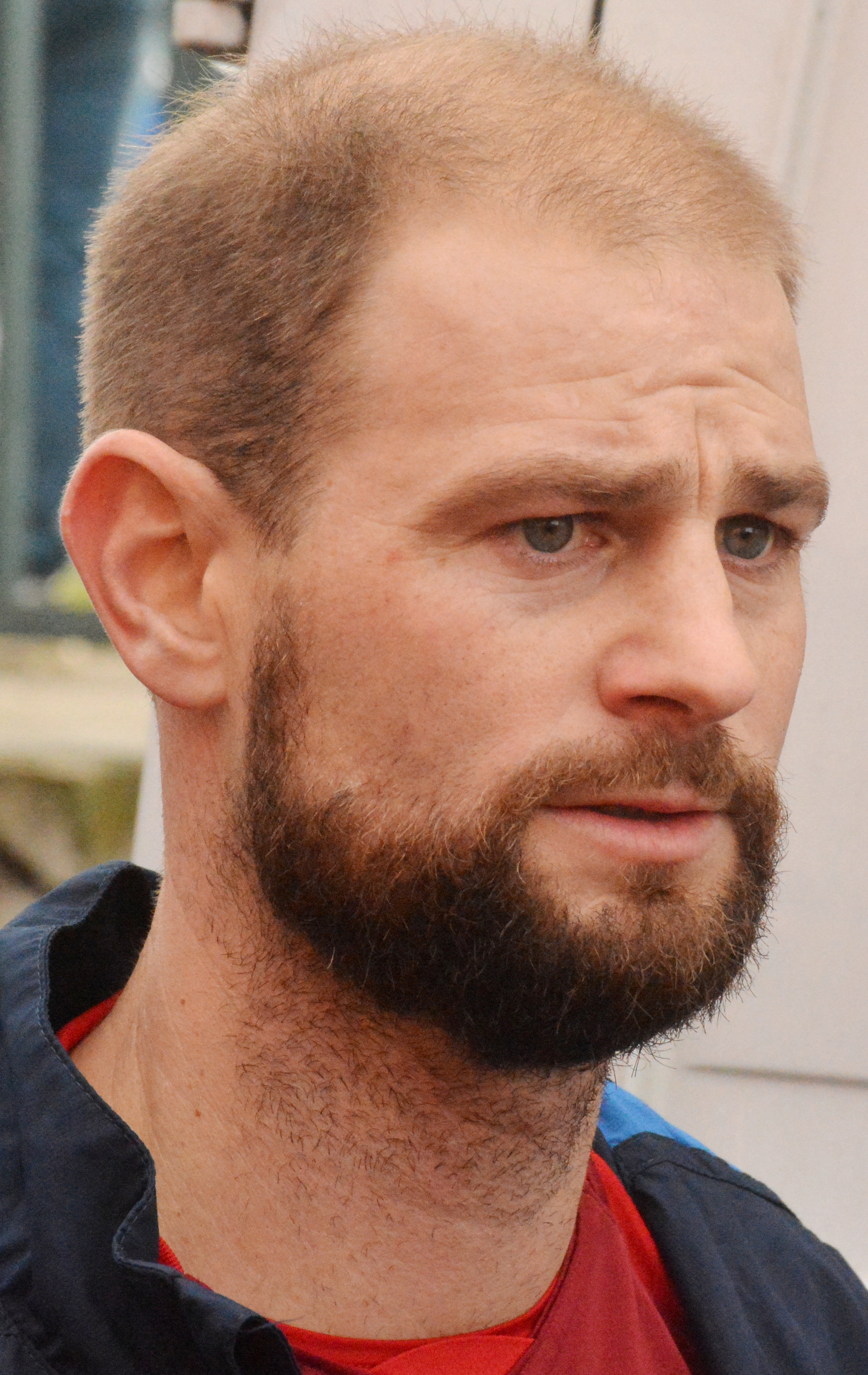
- Vlastimil Vidlička in 2017.

Personal information
- Full name: Vlastimil Vidlička
- Date of birth: 2 July 1981 (age 45)
- Place of birth: Zlín, Czechoslovakia
- Height: 1.79 m (5 ft 10 in)
- Position: Right back

Youth career
- 1986–1999: Tescoma Zlín

Senior career*
Years	Team	Apps	(Gls)
1999–2000	Tescoma Zlín	30	(0)
2000–2001	Slovan Liberec	5	(0)
2002–2007	Tescoma Zlín	141	(4)
2005	→ Wisła Kraków (loan)	7	(0)
2008–2011	FK Teplice	80	(4)
2011–2013	Sparta Prague	38	(3)
2013–2014	Sigma Olomouc	16	(0)
2014	→ Vysočina Jihlava (loan)	6	(0)
2015–2016	Chmel Blšany		

International career
1999	Czech Republic U17	4	(0)
1999–2000	Czech Republic U18	14	(0)
2001	Czech Republic U20	3	(0)
2002–2003	Czech Republic U21	16	(0)
- * Club domestic league appearances and goals

Vlastimil Vidlička (born 2 July 1981) is a Czech former professional footballer who played as a defender.

== Honours ==
Wisła Kraków

- Ekstraklasa: 2004–05

FK Teplice

- Czech Cup: 2008–09
