= Antonín Rosa =

Czech footballer (born 1986)

Personal information
- Full name: Antonín Rosa
- Date of birth: 12 November 1986 (age 40)
- Place of birth: Ústí nad Labem, Czechoslovakia
- Height: 1.91 m (6 ft 3 in)
- Positions: Left back; centre back; midfielder

Team information
- Current team: FC Oberlausitz Neugersdorf
- Number: 3

Youth career
- 1991–1997: FK Litoměřice
- 1998–2005: FK Teplice

Senior career*
Years	Team	Apps	(Gls)
2005–2013	Teplice	148	(8)
2007	→ Chmel Blšany (loan)	12	(2)
2013–2016	Mladá Boleslav	10	(0)
2015–2016	→ Ružomberok (loan)	38	(3)
2016–2017	Vysočina Jihlava	30	(0)
2018–	FC Oberlausitz Neugersdorf	11	(1)

International career
2004	Czech Republic U18	4	(0)
2004–2005	Czech Republic U19	11	(0)
2008	Czech Republic U21	1	(0)
- * Club domestic league appearances and goals as of 17 May 2018

Antonín Rosa (born 12 November 1986) is a Czech football midfielder currently playing for FC Oberlausitz Neugersdorf.

Rosa is the son of another Antonín Rosa, after whom he is named. His father played for Bohemians.
