= Jakub Mareš =

Czech footballer

Personal information
- Full name: Jakub Mareš
- Date of birth: 26 January 1987 (age 39)
- Place of birth: Teplice, Czechoslovakia
- Height: 1.82 m (6 ft 0 in)
- Position: Forward

Team information
- Current team: Zápy

Youth career
- 1992–2003: Teplice

Senior career*
Years	Team	Apps	(Gls)
2004–2012	Teplice	92	(17)
2005–2006	→ Ústí nad Labem (loan)	19	(1)
2006–2007	→ Slovácko (loan)	14	(0)
2011	→ Sparta Prague (loan)	12	(2)
2012–2014	Mladá Boleslav	43	(6)
2013–2014	→ Dukla Prague (loan)	20	(3)
2014–2016	Dukla Prague	52	(6)
2016–2017	Ružomberok	31	(14)
2017–2018	Slovan Bratislava	18	(12)
2018–2019	Zagłębie Lubin	40	(6)
2019–2022	Teplice	76	(20)
2022–2023	SU St. Martin	10	(15)
2023	Benešov	13	(4)
2023–2024	Ústí nad Labem	20	(3)
2024–2025	Zápy	28	(3)

International career
2002–2003	Czech Republic U16	17	(2)
2003–2004	Czech Republic U17	16	(6)
2004–2005	Czech Republic U18	13	(6)
2005–2006	Czech Republic U19	10	(3)
2006–2007	Czech Republic U20	9	(1)
Medal record
Men's football
Representing Czech Republic
FIFA U-20 World Cup
Runner-up	2007 Canada
- * Club domestic league appearances and goals as of 7 August 2025

Jakub Mareš (born 26 January 1987) is a Czech professional footballer who plays as a forward for Zápy in the Bohemian Football League.

He played at the 2007 FIFA U-20 World Cup, reaching the final with the Czech team.

== Career ==
Mareš first played in the Czech First League for FK Teplice, making his league debut in the 2004–05 season. He spent time on loan at clubs including FK Ústí nad Labem and Slovácko in his early career. He joined Sparta Prague on loan for the first half of the 2011–12 season, scoring twice in 12 matches.

Mareš transferred during the winter break of the season, becoming a Mladá Boleslav player in February 2012 for a transfer fee of around 10 million CZK. He played in the qualifying rounds of the Europa League for Mladá Boleslav in 2012.

Mareš joined Dukla Prague in August 2013 on loan until the end of the 2013–14 season. In his season with the club he scored three times in 20 matches. Following his season on loan, Mareš signed permanently for the club in June 2014, agreeing a two-year contract.

== Honours ==
Czech Rupublic U21

- FIFA U-20 World Cup runner-up: 2007
