= Radek Rabušic =

Czech footballer

Personal information
- Date of birth: 21 November 1963 (age 62)
- Place of birth: Břeclav, Czechoslovakia
- Position: Goalkeeper

Senior career*
Years	Team	Apps	(Gls)
–1983	Zbrojovka Brno		
1983–1984	Slavia Karlovy Vary		
1984–1993	Zbrojovka / Boby Brno		
1993–1997	Edessaikos		
1997–1998	Zeman Brno		
1998–1999	Tatran Poštorná		

Managerial career
- 2002–2003: 1. FC Synot
- 2004–2005: Niki Volos
- * Club domestic league appearances and goals

Radek Rabušic (born 21 November 1963) is a retired Czech football goalkeeper and later manager.
