= Vlastimil Stožický =

Czech footballer

Personal information
- Full name: Vlastimil Stožický
- Date of birth: 19 August 1983 (age 43)
- Place of birth: Varnsdorf, Czechoslovakia
- Height: 1.81 m (5 ft 11 in)
- Positions: Winger; fullback

Team information
- Current team: Viktoria Žižkov
- Number: 7

Youth career
- 1988–1997: Kolos Jiříkov
- 1997–2000: Teplice

Senior career*
| Years | Team | Apps | (Gls) |
| 2001–2003 | Ústí nad Labem | | |
| 2003–2004 | Teplice | | |
| 2004–2006 | Ústí nad Labem | 29 | (7) |
| 2006–2012 | Teplice | 100 | (17) |
| 2007 | → Jablonec (loan) | 5 | (0) |
| 2008 | → Most (loan) | 11 | (1) |
| 2011 | → Ústí nad Labem (loan) | 11 | (0) |
| 2012–2013 | Spartak Trnava | 8 | (0) |
| 2013 | → Baník Ostrava (loan) | 12 | (1) |
| 2013– | Viktoria Žižkov | | |
- * Club domestic league appearances and goals as of 29 May 2013

Vlastimil Stožický (born 19 August 1983) is a Czech football midfielder who plays for FK Viktoria Žižkov.

== Spartak Trnava ==
In May 2012, he joined Slovak club Spartak Trnava on a two-year contract.
