= Andrej Stojchevski =

Macedonian footballer (born 2003)

Personal information
- Date of birth: 26 May 2003 (age 23)
- Place of birth: Skopje, Macedonia
- Height: 1.86 m (6 ft 1 in)
- Positions: Defensive midfielder; centre-back

Team information
- Current team: Slovácko
- Number: 4

Youth career
- –2020: Vardar Skopje
- 2022: Žilina

Senior career*
Years	Team	Apps	(Gls)
2020	Vardar Skopje	5	(1)
2021	Akademija Pandev	19	(1)
2022–2025	Žilina	56	(4)
2022–2025	→ Žilina B	22	(1)
2025	→ Slovácko (loan)	13	(0)
2025–	Slovácko	28	(0)

International career^{‡}
2019	North Macedonia U17	2	(0)
2021–2024	North Macedonia U21	23	(1)
2025–	North Macedonia	10	(0)
- * Club domestic league appearances and goals as of 25 May 2026 ‡ National team caps and goals as of 8 October 2026

Andrej Stojchevski (Macedonian: Андреј Стојчевски; born 26 May 2003) is a Macedonian professional footballer who plays as a midfielder or centre-back for Slovácko and the North Macedonia national team.

== Career ==
Stojchevski made his Slovak Super Liga debut for Žilina as a starter in a 3–0 defeat against Ružomberok on 4 May 2022. On 21 January 2025, he joined Czech club Slovácko on a half-year loan with an option to buy. On 14 June 2025, Stojchevski signed a contract with Slovácko until 2028.

On 6 June 2025, during the 2026 FIFA World Cup qualification, Stojchevski debuted for the North Macedonia senior squad in a 1–1 draw against Belgium.
