= Lukáš Zoubele =

Czech footballer

Personal information
- Full name: Lukáš Zoubele
- Date of birth: 20 December 1985 (age 40)
- Place of birth: Ústí nad Labem, Czechoslovakia
- Height: 1.88 m (6 ft 2 in)
- Positions: Attacking midfielder; forward

Youth career
- 1991–1999: FK Neštěmice
- 1999–2005: FK Teplice

Senior career*
Years	Team	Apps	(Gls)
2005–2006	Teplice	0	(0)
2006–2007	Ústí nad Labem	26	(4)
2007–2009	Kladno	55	(3)
2010–2012	Teplice	42	(1)
2012–2014	Jablonec	35	(3)
2015–2016	Zbrojovka Brno	18	(3)
2016–2020	Vysočina Jihlava	95	(20)
2020–2021	Viktoria Žižkov	16	(3)
2021–2023	Vysočina Jihlava	37	(2)
2023	Ústí nad Labem	7	(2)
- * Club domestic league appearances and goals

Lukáš Zoubele (born 20 December 1985) is a retired Czech professional footballer who played as a midfielder.

== Career ==
Zoubele began playing football for FK Teplice's youth side. He went on loans to FK Ústí nad Labem and SK Kladno in order to get regular playing time before returning to Teplice in 2010.

In July 2023, Zoubele signed a contract with Ústí nad Labem. In November 2023 Zoubele ended his professional career and moved to the position of sports manager of Ústí nad Labem.
