= Admir Ljevaković =

Bosnian-Herzegovinian footballer (born 1984)

Personal information
- Date of birth: 7 August 1984 (age 42)
- Place of birth: Tešanj, SFR Yugoslavia
- Height: 1.77 m (5 ft 10 in)
- Position: Midfielder

Team information
- Current team: Teplice B (manager)

Youth career
- 1996–2002: TOŠK Tešanj

Senior career*
Years	Team	Apps	(Gls)
2002–2005	TOŠK Tešanj		
2005–2007	NK Čelik Zenica	44	(6)
2007–2022	FK Teplice	306	(14)

Managerial career
- 2022–?: Teplice B (assistant)
- 2025–: Teplice B
- * Club domestic league appearances and goals

Admir Ljevaković (born 7 August 1984) is a Bosnian former footballer and since 2022 a football manager. He played 14 seasons for FK Teplice in the Czech First League in 2007–2021.

== Records ==
In 2021 he became the first foreigner in history to appear in 300 games in the Czech First League and thus became a member of the league legends club.

After he ended his professional career in 2021, Admir Ljevaković held the record of most received yellow cards in the history of the Czech First League (106 yellow cards). This record was broken in 2024 by Marek Matějovský, who, however, needed 100 matches more than Ljevaković to achieve it. Ljevaković received only one red card during his time in the Czech First League.

== Coaching career ==
On 29 December 2024, Ljevaković was appointed as manager of Bohemian Football League team Teplice B.

== Personal life ==
In June 2009 he married a handball player Senija Jabandžić with whom he has two sons: Mak and Din.
