= Ibrahim Elsamni =

Egyptian footballer

Personal information
- Place of birth: Egypt

Senior career*
| Years | Team | Apps | (Gls) |
| – | Al-Sekka Al-Hadid | ? | (?) |

International career
| – | Egypt | ? | (?) |
- * Club domestic league appearances and goals

Ibrahim Elsamni is an Egyptian former footballer who played at both professional and international levels.

== Career ==
Elsamni played club football in the Egyptian Premier League with Al-Sekka Al-Hadid.

He also represented Egypt at international level.

== Personal life ==
Elsamni's two sons, Ali and Osama, are both professional players.
