= Tomáš Grigar =

Czech footballer

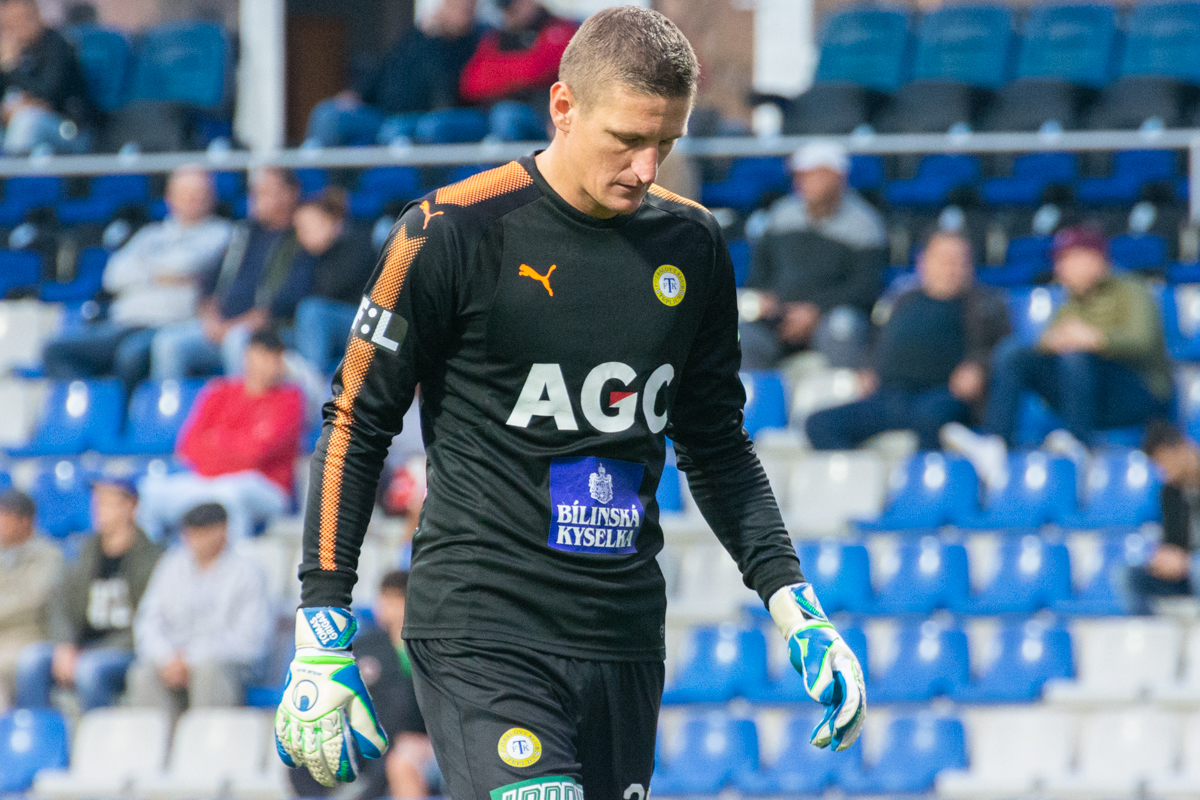

Personal information
- Date of birth: 1 February 1983 (age 43)
- Place of birth: Opava, Czechoslovakia
- Height: 1.93 m (6 ft 4 in)
- Position: Goalkeeper

Youth career
- 1993–2001: FC Vítkovice

Senior career*
Years	Team	Apps	(Gls)
2001–2003	FC Vítkovice	40	(0)
2004–2008	Sparta Prague	24	(0)
2008–2024	Teplice	343	(0)
2024–2026	Ústí nad Labem	54	(0)

International career
2009	Czech Republic	2	(0)
- * Club domestic league appearances and goals as of 28 May 2026

Tomáš Grigar (born 1 February 1983) is a Czech professional footballer who plays as a goalkeeper. He was a member of the Czech Republic national football team for a short period of time.
