= Michal Kordula =

Czech footballer and manager

Personal information
- Date of birth: 11 February 1978 (age 48)
- Place of birth: Ratíškovice, Czechoslovakia
- Height: 1.82 m (5 ft 11 1/2 in)
- Position: Midfielder

Team information
- Current team: 1. FC Slovácko

Youth career
- 1986–1997: Baník Ratíškovice

Senior career*
Years	Team	Apps	(Gls)
1997–2001	Baník Ratíškovice	56	(3)
2002–2007	FK Jablonec 97	114	(1)
2007–2008	FC Kärnten	27	(3)
2009–2013	1. FC Slovácko	70	(3)

Managerial career
- 2017–2018: 1. FC Slovácko
- * Club domestic league appearances and goals

Michal Kordula (born 11 February 1978) is a Czech football manager and former player.

Kordula started his career in Baník Ratíškovice. Later, he and was transferred to FK Jablonec 97. Here, he played for seven seasons before moving to Austria to play for FC Kärnten. He then played for 1. FC Slovácko (2009–2013). In September 2017, he was appointed as the new manager of Slovácko, replacing Stanislav Levý, who was promoted to the position of director of football.
