= Štěpán Vachoušek =

Czech footballer

Personal information
- Date of birth: 26 July 1979 (age 47)
- Place of birth: Duchcov, Czechoslovakia
- Height: 1.86 m (6 ft 1 in)
- Position: Midfielder

Youth career
- 1985–1990: Lokomotiva Bílina
- 1990–1997: Teplice

Senior career*
Years	Team	Apps	(Gls)
1997–1998	Teplice	11	(0)
1998–1999	1.FC Česká Lípa	6	(1)
1999	Teplice	5	(0)
2000–2001	SC Xaverov	24	(6)
2001	Chmel Blšany	6	(3)
2001–2002	Teplice	34	(6)
2002–2003	Slavia Prague	37	(10)
2003–2004	Marseille	21	(0)
2004–2008	Austria Wien	53	(5)
2008–2017	Teplice	172	(23)
2010	→ Sparta Prague (loan)	4	(0)
2017–2018	FC Oberlausitz Neugersdorf	33	(8)
Total		406	(62)

International career
2000–2002	Czech Republic U21	20	(7)
2002–2006	Czech Republic	23	(2)
Medal record
Men's football
Representing Czech Republic
UEFA European Championship
Bronze medal – third place	2004 Portugal
UEFA European Under-21 Championship
Winner	2002 Switzerland
- * Club domestic league appearances and goals

Štěpán Vachoušek (born 26 July 1979) is a Czech former professional footballer who played as a midfielder. He spent most of his career playing for FK Teplice, but also spent time abroad playing for clubs in France and Austria. He played internationally for the Czech Republic at youth and full level, winning the 2002 UEFA European Under-21 Championship with the under-21 team before making his way to the full team, for whom he played 23 times between 2002 and 2006, including at Euro 2004. He is a skillful left-wingback or playmaker.

== Club career ==
Vachoušek started playing in the Czech First League for FK Teplice in the 1997–98 season.

He left his home country to play for French club Olympique de Marseille in 2003 before moving to FK Austria Wien in 2004. He returned to FK Teplice in 2008. He joined Sparta Prague on loan in 2010, but spent just four months there before returning in December of the same year. In March 2014 the player extended his contract with Teplice until the end of the 2014–15 season. He retired from playing at the end of the 2016–17 Czech First League, describing the move as "the most difficult decision in my life".

== International career ==
Vachoušek represented his country at youth level, playing in the final of the 2002 UEFA European Under-21 Championship, a match in which the Czech Republic won the tournament.

In June 2004 he was named in his nation's squad for the Euro 2004 tournament. He played in the match against Germany at the tournament.

== Later career ==
After finishing his playing career, Vachoušek became sporting director at FK Teplice. His son, Tadeáš, broke into Teplice's first team in the 2022–23 season and was rewarded with a contract extension until 2026.
