= Claude Videgla =

Togolese footballer

Personal information
- Full name: Claude-Roland Videgla
- Date of birth: 14 May 1990 (age 36)
- Place of birth: Lomé, Togo
- Height: 1.78 m (5 ft 10 in)
- Position: Midfielder

Youth career
- Étoile Filante

Senior career*
Years	Team	Apps	(Gls)
2007–2008	Étoile Filante		
2008–2009	Dukla Příbram	20	(0)
2009–2011	1. FK Příbram	28	(1)
2012–2013	VfB Oldenburg	18	(2)
2013–?	1. FK Příbram	1	(0)
2014–?	SO Chambéry Foot	5	(0)
2015–2016	SV Amasya Spor Lohne 1993	11	(3)
2016–2019	TV Dinklage 04	46	(9)
2019–2021	Blau-Weiß Lohne	13	(1)
2021–2022	TuS Bersenbrück	1	(0)

International career
2010	Togo	1	(0)
- * Club domestic league appearances and goals as of 00:13, 15 April 2025 (UTC)

Claude-Roland Videgla (born 14 May 1990) is a Togolese professional footballer who plays as a midfielder. He made one appearance for the Togo national team in 2010.

== Career ==
Videgla began his career in Lomé with Étoile Filante.

In August 2008 he signed with Czech club 1. FK Příbram.

In January 2012 he signed a five-month contract with German team VfB Oldenburg. In June, Oldenburg announced that Videgla had extended his contract by another year.

In summer 2013 Videgla returned to 1. FK Příbram.
