= Pavel Němčický =

Czech footballer (born 1977)

Personal information
- Date of birth: 13 August 1977 (age 49)
- Place of birth: Kunovice, Czechoslovakia
- Height: 1.79 m (5 ft 10 1/2 in)
- Position: Defender

Youth career
- 1984–1991: TJ Kunovice
- 1991–1996: Slovácká Slavia Uherské Hradiště

Senior career*
Years	Team	Apps	(Gls)
1995–1996	Slovácká Slavia U. Hradiště	11	(0)
1996–1998	FC Slovan Liberec	30	(0)
1999–2010	1. FC Slovácko	203	(4)
Total		244	(4)

International career
1997	Czech Republic U21	1	(0)
- * Club domestic league appearances and goals

Pavel Němčický (born 13 August 1977) is a Czech former football player.

Němčický spent almost his whole Gambrinus liga career with 1. FC Slovácko, where he played since 1999. After the 2009-2010 season, the club decided to not extend his contract, and Němčický decided to end his professional career in July 2010.
