= Pavel Lukáš =

Czech footballer (born 1975)

Personal information
- Date of birth: 20 November 1975 (age 50)
- Place of birth: Czechoslovakia
- Position: Defender

Youth career
- 1984–1988: Sokol Zápy
- 1988: BSS Brandýs nad Labem
- 1989–1993: Mladá Boleslav
- 1993–1994: VTJ Karlovy Vary

Senior career*
Years	Team	Apps	(Gls)
1994–1997	Mladá Boleslav		
1997–1998	Sparta Prague	0	(0)
1998–1999	Chrudim		
1999–2000	Xaverov	28	(3)
2000–2001	Mladá Boleslav	28	(5)
2002–2005	Hradec Králové	70	(3)
2005–2012	Bohemians 1905	93	(5)
2012–2014	Oberlausitz Neugersdorf		
- * Club domestic league appearances and goals as of 29 May 2011

Pavel Lukáš (born 20 November 1975) is a Czech former football player.

His brother Petr Lukáš is also a professional footballer.
