= Martin Cseh =

Slovak football defender

Personal information
- Full name: Martin Cseh
- Date of birth: 22 August 1988 (age 38)
- Place of birth: Trenčín, Czechoslovakia
- Height: 1.85 m (6 ft 1 in)
- Position: Right-back

Youth career
- –1999: AS Trencin
- 1999–2006: Slovan Bratislava

Senior career*
Years	Team	Apps	(Gls)
2006–2007	Slovan Bratislava B	30	(0)
2007–2009	Slovan Bratislava	0	(0)
2009–2015	Bohemians 1905	88	(3)
2016	Sandecja Nowy Sącz	13	(0)
2016–2017	Bytovia Bytów	22	(0)
2018	Andau	1	(0)
2018–2019	Wallern	13	(1)
2019	Oed/Zeillern		
2019–2020	Sokol Královice		
2020	Aritma Prague		
2021–2022	Slavoj Polná		
2022–2023	TJ Sokol Písnice		

International career
2007	Slovakia U19	2	(0)
2009–2010	Slovakia U21	6	(0)
- * Club domestic league appearances and goals as of 22 August 2024

Martin Cseh (born 22 August 1988) is a Slovak footballer who plays as a right-back.
