= Tomáš Janíček =

Czech footballer (born 1982)

Personal information
- Date of birth: September 7, 1982 (age 44)
- Place of birth: Gottwaldov, Czechoslovakia
- Height: 1.84 m (6 ft 1/2 in)
- Position: Centre back

Youth career
- 1990–1991: Alfa Slušovice
- 1991–2002: Tescoma Zlín

Senior career*
Years	Team	Apps	(Gls)
2002–2007	Tescoma Zlín	92	(5)
2007–2008	Nitra	28	(1)
2008–2014	Mladá Boleslav	81	(0)
2014–2015	Karviná	26	(1)
2015–2018	Fastav Zlín	52	(1)
2018–2019	Prostějov	36	(1)
- * Club domestic league appearances and goals

Tomáš Janíček (born 7 September 1982) is a retired Czech footballer who played as a centre back.

== Club career ==
He began playing at Tescoma Zlin as a nine-year-old. In 2007, a loan deal took him to Nitra in the Corgoň liga. After his return he signed for Mladá Boleslav.

In December 2019, 37-year old Janíček confirmed, that he would retire due to problems with his knee.
