= Libor Došek =

Czech footballer

Personal information
- Date of birth: 24 April 1978 (age 48)
- Place of birth: Brno, Czechoslovakia
- Height: 1.99 m (6 ft 6 in)
- Position: Striker

Youth career
- 1983–1997: Boby Brno

Senior career*
Years	Team	Apps	(Gls)
1997–1998	→ 1. FC Slovácko (loan)	27	(9)
1998	1. FC Brno	2	(0)
1998	→ 1. FC Slovácko (loan)	11	(3)
1999–2000	Chmel Blšany	32	(5)
2000–2004	1. FC Brno	102	(29)
2004–2005	Slovan Liberec	30	(7)
2005–2009	Sparta Prague	68	(27)
2009	→ Skoda Xanthi (loan)	9	(4)
2010–2011	Teplice	32	(4)
2011–2016	1. FC Slovácko	123	(52)
Total		436	(140)

International career
1999–2000	Czech Republic U-21	2	(0)
2000	Czech Republic (Olympic)	3	(0)
- * Club domestic league appearances and goals

Libor Došek (born 24 April 1978 in Brno) is a Czech former professional footballer. His position was striker. He was called up for the Czech Republic for the 2000 Olympics. He was known for a strong height advantage and good aerial ability.
