= Petr Mach (footballer) =

Czech footballer (born 1985)

Personal information
- Date of birth: 22 March 1985 (age 41)
- Place of birth: Čáslav, Czech Republic
- Height: 1.89 m (6 ft 2 in)
- Position: Defender

Youth career
- MFK Chrudim

Senior career*
Years	Team	Apps	(Gls)
2004–2005	MFK Chrudim		
2005–2006	FK Pardubice	22	(0)
2006–2008	Baník Sokolov	53	(0)
2008–2009	Mladá Boleslav	18	(0)
2009–2010	→ Bohemians Prague (loan)	15	(0)
2010–2011	Varnsdorf	13	(0)
2011	Mladá Boleslav B	3	(0)
2011–2012	Viktoria Žižkov	6	(0)
2012	Baník Ostrava	18	(1)
2014	Gaz Metan Mediaș	2	(0)
Total		150	(1)
- * Club domestic league appearances and goals

Petr Mach (born 22 March 1985 in the Czech Republic) is a Czech retired footballer who is last known to have played for CS Gaz Metan Mediaș in Romania.

== Career ==
Mach started his senior career with FK Pardubice. In 2008, he signed for FK Mladá Boleslav in the Czech First League, where he made eighteen league appearances and scored zero goals. After that, he played for Bohemians Prague, FK Varnsdorf, FK Viktoria Žižkov, FC Baník Ostrava, and CS Gaz Metan Mediaș before retiring.
