= Jiří Rychlík =

Czech footballer (born 1977)

Personal information
- Full name: Jiří Rychlík
- Date of birth: 24 November 1977 (age 48)
- Place of birth: Příbram, Czechoslovakia
- Height: 1.81 m (5 ft 11 in)
- Position: Left back

Team information
- Current team: Bohemians 1905
- Number: 9

Senior career*
Years	Team	Apps	(Gls)
1996–2000	Dukla Příbram	23	(1)
2000–2005	Marila Příbram	108	(4)
2005	Slavia Prague (loan)	18	(0)
2005–2006	Mladá Boleslav	24	(1)
2006	MFK Ružomberok	13	(0)
2007–	Bohemians 1905	63	(1)
- * Club domestic league appearances and goals as of 29 May 2011

Jiří Rychlík (born 24 November 1977) is a Czech footballer. He currently plays for Bohemians 1905.
