= Aidin Mahmutović =

Bosnian professional footballer (born 1986)

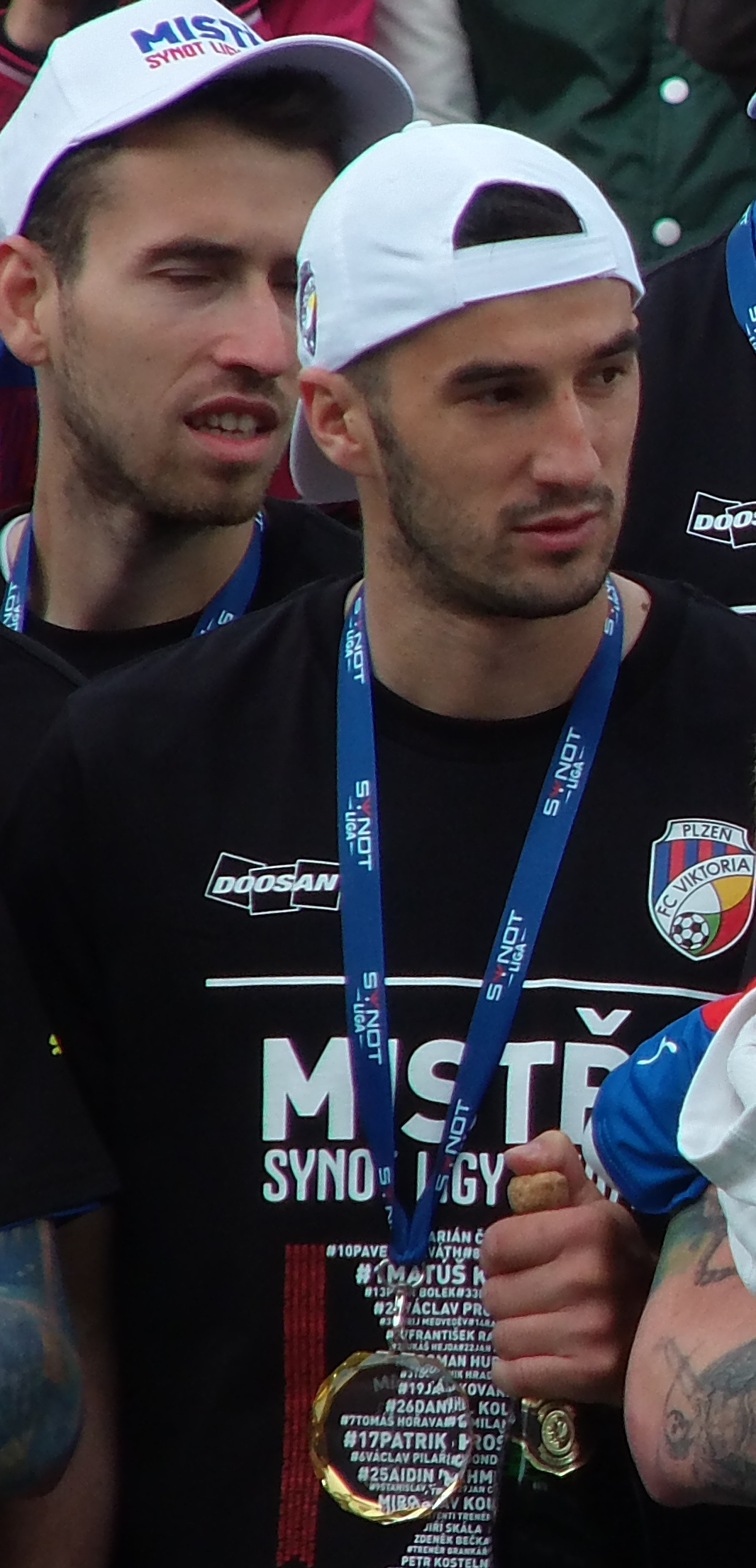
- Mahmutović (middle) with Viktoria Plzeň in 2015

Personal information
- Date of birth: 6 April 1986 (age 40)
- Place of birth: Doboj, SFR Yugoslavia
- Height: 1.80 m (5 ft 11 in)
- Position: Forward

Youth career
- TOŠK Tešanj

Senior career*
Years	Team	Apps	(Gls)
2005–2007	Čelik Zenica	68	(9)
2007–2014	Teplice	160	(58)
2007–2008	→ Ústí nad Labem (loan)	16	(6)
2014–2017	Viktoria Plzeň	23	(9)
2016	→ Sigma Olomouc (loan)	10	(2)
2016–2017	→ Příbram (loan)	13	(1)
2017	Panionios	11	(0)
2017–2018	Čelik Zenica	10	(5)
2018–2019	Tuzla City	3	(0)
2019–2022	Čelik Zenica	17	(6)

International career
2004–2008	Bosnia and Herzegovina U21	5	(0)
- * Club domestic league appearances and goals

Aidin Mahmutović (born 6 April 1986) is a Bosnian retired professional footballer who played as a forward.

== Personal life ==
Mahmutović is married to Emina Ademović. He lived in Bosnia and Herzegovina during the Yugoslav Wars.

== Honours ==
Teplice

- Czech Cup: 2008–09

Viktoria Plzeň

- Czech First League: 2014–15
- Czech Supercup: 2015
