= Tomáš Vondrášek =

Czech footballer

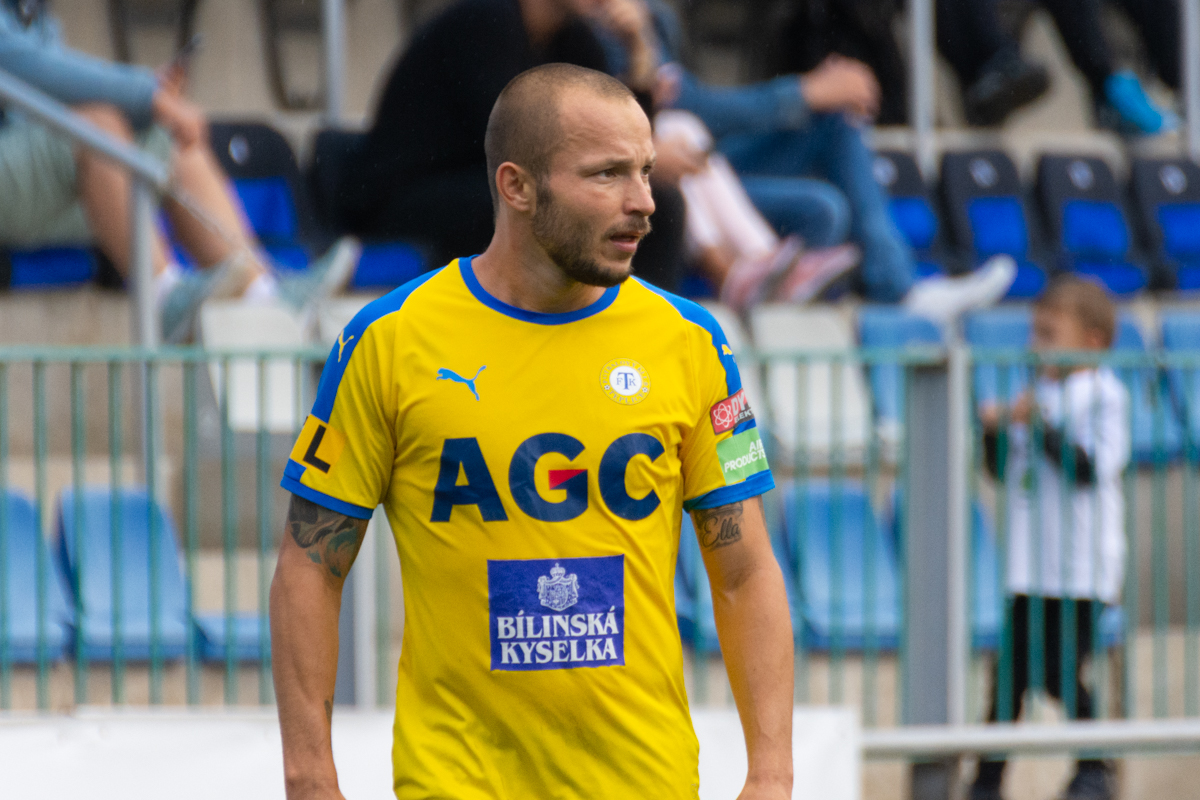

Personal information
- Date of birth: 26 October 1987 (age 39)
- Place of birth: Czechoslovakia
- Height: 1.75 m (5 ft 9 in)
- Position: Right back

Team information
- Current team: Ústí nad Labem
- Number: 17

Youth career
- 1993–2003: Baník Sokolov
- 2003–2006: Teplice

Senior career*
Years	Team	Apps	(Gls)
2006–2023	Teplice	339	(21)
2007	→ Ústí nad Labem (loan)	12	(3)
2007	→ Baník Sokolov (loan)	10	(1)
2008	→ Ústí nad Labem (loan)	13	(0)
2023–2025	Dukla Prague	42	(3)
2025–	Ústí nad Labem	18	(3)
- * Club domestic league appearances and goals as of 28 May 2026

Tomáš Vondrášek (born 26 October 1987) is a Czech professional footballer who plays as a striker for Ústí nad Labem.
