= Osama Elsamni =

Egyptian Japanese footballer (born 1988)

Personal information
- Full name: Osama Ibrahim Ali Elsamni
- Date of birth: 29 September 1988 (age 38)
- Place of birth: Okinawa, Japan
- Height: 1.78 m (5 ft 10 in)
- Position: Striker

Youth career
- 2004–2006: Tokyo Verdy 1969

Senior career*
Years	Team	Apps	(Gls)
2007–2008	Tokyo Verdy	0	(0)
2009–2010	FK Teplice	9	(0)
2011	Montedio Yamagata	0	(0)
2012–2016	YSCC Yokohama	23	(3)
- * Club domestic league appearances and goals

Osama Ibrahim Ali Elsamni (Arabic: أسامة إبراهيم علي السمني, romanized: Usāma Ibrāhīm ʿAlī as-Samnī; Japanese: エルサムニー・オサマ, romanized: Erusamunī Osama; born 29 September 1988) is an Egyptian-Japanese retired footballer who played as a striker.

== Career ==
=== Tokyo Verdy ===
Having emerged from Tokyo Verdy youth playing alongside his older brother Ali. Osama was the top scorer of the Japanese Youth Championship. He was soon called up to train with the first team, where he was given the No.32 shirt. Despite not making an actual appearance for Verdy, his performances at youth and academy level attracted interest from across the globe. With FK Teplice, Portuguese outfit Belenenses leading the chase. After trials at both clubs, he went to FK Teplice.

=== FK Teplice ===
In February 2009, Elsamni signed for Gambrinus Liga side FK Teplice.

Elsamni made his debut in the 3–0 win against FC Viktoria Plzeň on 8 March 2009, where he assisted the third goal.

Elsamni scored his first goal for FK Teplice when they defeated FK Ústí nad Labem in the Czech Cup on 3 September. The game ended in a 4–1 win for Teplice. Elsamni came as a substitute in the 83rd minute, and scored after three minutes on pitch.

By the end of 2009–2010 season, Elsamni has scored 8 goals for FK Teplice B, and 1 goal for FK Teplice first team.

In June 2010, Elsamni terminated his contract with FK Teplice. He was then linked with a possible transfer to Egyptian giants Zamalek, but negotiations reached a closed end.

=== Montedio Yamagata ===
Osama joined Japanese side Montedio Yamagata in January 2011. "I can score goals with my left, right feet or head. I improved my physical strength in the Czech Republic. I'm confident of scoring," Elsamni said. He was released in January 2012.

=== YSCC Yokohama ===
On 16 August 2012, Elsamni joined Japan Football League side YSCC Yokohama. He made his debut in the Emperor's Cup on 2 September 2012 against Vanraure Hachinohe.

== Club statistics ==
Updated to 20 November 2016.

Czech Republic

Club	Season	League			Czech Supercup		Czech Cup		International		Total	
Club	Season	Division	Apps	Goals	Apps	Goals	Apps	Goals	Apps	Goals	Apps	Goals
FK Teplice	2008–09	Gambrinus Liga	5	0	—	—	0	0	—	—	5	0
FK Teplice	2009–10	Gambrinus Liga	4	0	—	—	1	1	0	0	5	1
Career total			9	1	0	0	1	1	0	0	10	2

Japan

Club performance			League		Cup		League Cup		Total	
Season	Club	League	Apps	Goals	Apps	Goals	Apps	Goals	Apps	Goals
Japan			League		Emperor's Cup		J. League Cup		Total	
2007	Tokyo Verdy	J2 League	0	0	0	0	-		0	0
2008	Tokyo Verdy	J1 League	0	0	0	0	0	0	0	0
2011	Montedio Yamagata	J1 League	0	0	0	0	0	0	0	0
2012	YSCC	JFL	0	0	1	0	-		1	0
2013	YSCC	JFL	0	0	0	0	-		0	0
2014	YSCC	J3 League	0	0	0	0	-		0	0
2015	YSCC	J3 League	13	2	0	0	-		13	2
2016	YSCC	J3 League	10	1	0	0	-		10	1
Total			23	3	1	0	0	0	24	3

== Honours ==
- Czech Cup: 2008–09

== International career ==
Elsamni revealed in May 2009 his interest in representing Egypt.

== Personal life ==
Elsamni is from a sporting family; his older brother Ali Elsamni is also a footballer, and his father Ibrahim was a player in Egypt national football team.
