= Jiří Plíšek =

Czech footballer and manager (born 1972)

Personal information
- Date of birth: 21 August 1972 (age 54)
- Place of birth: Aš, Czechoslovakia

Youth career
- 1978–1987: Jiskra Aš
- 1987–1988: Dukla Prague
- 1988–1990: Dukla Ruzyně
- 1990–1991: KPS Brno

Senior career*
Years	Team	Apps	(Gls)
1991	Tatran Smíchov		
1991–1993	Bradrs Rudná		
1993	Union Čelákovice		
1993–1994	Motorlet Prague		
1994–1996	VfB Helmbrechts		

Managerial career
- 1991–1992: TJ Ruzyně (youth)
- 1992–1993: Viktoria Žižkov (youth)
- 1993–1994: Motorlet Prague (C-youth)
- 1997–1999: Mladá Boleslav (youth)
- 1999–2001: Mladá Boleslav (assistant)
- 2001–2004: Slavia Prague (youth)
- 2002–2003: Czech Republic U18
- 2003–2004: Czech Republic U19
- 2004: Czech Republic U16
- 2004: Željezničar
- 2005–2006: Ústí nad Labem
- 2006: Slovácko
- 2008–2011: Teplice
- 2011: Sarajevo
- 2012–2013: Hradec Králové
- * Club domestic league appearances and goals

Jiří Plišek (born 21 August 1972) is a Czech professional football manager and former player.

Plíšek joined Czech First League side Hradec Králové as manager in the summer of 2012, replacing the outgoing Václav Kotal. He remained in his position until April 2013, when he was sacked.

He has managed both Željezničar from June to October 2004 and Sarajevo from July until December 2011.
