= Michal Doležal (footballer) =

Czech footballer

Personal information
- Date of birth: 19 August 1977 (age 49)
- Place of birth: Teplice, Czechoslovakia
- Height: 1.77 m (5 ft 10 in)
- Position: Midfielder

Team information
- Current team: SV Germania Schöneiche

Youth career
- 1982–1984: Spartak Bystřany
- 1984–1992: Sklo Union Teplice
- 1992–1996: Sparta Prague

Senior career*
| Years | Team | Apps | (Gls) |
| 1996 | FK Teplice | 2 | (0) |
| 1996 | FK Ústí nad Labem | 14 | (1) |
| 1997–1999 | FK Teplice | 49 | (1) |
| 1999–2000 | SK Hradec Králové | 16 | (0) |
| 2000–2010 | FK Teplice | 218 | (19) |
| 2001 | → FK Chomutov (loan) | 5 | (3) |
| 2009 | → Dynamo České Budějovice (loan) | 9 | (0) |
| 2010–2011 | → FK Ústí nad Labem (loan) | 26 | (2) |
| 2011–2012 | SV Germania Schöneiche | 21 | (4) |
- * Club domestic league appearances and goals as of 14 May 2012

Michal Doležal (born 19 August 1977, in Teplice) is a Czech football midfielder formerly playing for FK Teplice in the Czech Republic. Doležal usually plays on the far right side of the field specializing in crosses into the penalty area.
