= Jaromír Šilhan =

Czech footballer

Personal information
- Date of birth: 10 April 1983 (age 43)
- Place of birth: Czechoslovakia
- Height: 1.91 m (6 ft 3 in)
- Position: Forward

Team information
- Current team: FK Baník Sokolov
- Number: 24

Senior career*
Years	Team	Apps	(Gls)
2007–2010	Kladno	52	(5)
2008	→ Karlovy Vary (loan)		
2010–	Sokolov	33	(3)
- * Club domestic league appearances and goals as of 31 December 2011

Jaromír Šilhan (born 10 April 1983) is a professional Czech football player who currently plays for FK Baník Sokolov. He has made more than 50 appearances in the Gambrinus liga for Kladno.
