= Pavel Verbíř =

Czech footballer

Personal information
- Date of birth: 13 November 1972 (age 53)
- Place of birth: Mělník, Czechoslovakia
- Height: 1.76 m (5 ft 9 in)
- Position: Midfielder

Youth career
- 1979–1981: Sempra Lobkovice
- 1981–1983: Sokol Obříství
- 1983–1987: Spolana Neratovice
- 1987–1991: Sparta Prague

Senior career*
Years	Team	Apps	(Gls)
1991–2011	Teplice	407	(87)

International career
1996–2000	Czech Republic	10	(2)
- * Club domestic league appearances and goals

Pavel Verbíř (born 13 November 1972) is a Czech former professional footballer who spent his entire playing career in the Czech First League with FK Teplice. Verbíř is often referred to by his nickname 'Verba'.

== Career ==
Verbíř's first professional club was Sparta Prague in 1987. There, he did not become a first-team regular so he moved to FK Teplice in 1992. In 2007, he won the Personality of the League award at the Czech Footballer of the Year awards. He ended his professional career after the 2010–11 season.

== International career ==
Verbíř has played 10 matches for the Czech Republic national football team scoring two goals.

== Career statistics ==
Appearances and goals by club, season and competition
Club	Season	League		Europa	
Club	Season	Apps	Goals	Apps	Goals
Teplice
Teplice	1995–96 (2. liga)	28	11	–	
Teplice	1996–97	23	5	–	
Teplice	1997–98	23	4	–	
Teplice	1998–99	28	13	–	
Teplice	1999–2000	29	10	6	1
Teplice	2000–01	28	6	–	
Teplice	2001–02	21	7	–	
Teplice	2002–03	28	3	–	
Teplice	2003–04	30	7	6	0
Teplice	2004–05	27	6	–	
Teplice	2005–06	29	6	4	0
Teplice	2006–07	15	1	–	
Teplice	2007–08	29	4	–	
Teplice	2008–09	21	0	–	
Teplice	2009–10	26	2	2	0
Teplice	2010–11	21	2	–	
Career total		379	76	18	1

== See also ==
- List of one-club men in association football
