= 1. FC Slovácko =

Czech association football club

- Full name: 1. FC Slovácko, a.s.
- Founded: 1927; 99 years ago (as SK Staré Město)
- Ground: Městský fotbalový stadion, Uherské Hradiště
- Capacity: 8,121
- Chairman: Jaroslav Vašíček and Zdeněk Heneš
- Manager: Jan Jelínek
- League: Czech First League
- 2025–26: 14th of 16
- Website: www.fcslovacko.cz/en
Home colours	Away colours	Third colours

1. FC Slovácko is a Czech football club based in Uherské Hradiště. The team was established in 1927 as SK Staré Město and on 1 July 2000 as 1. FC Synot, which was a merger of the original club with FC Slovácká Slavia Uherské Hradiště. Since 2009 the club has played in the Czech First League. Slovácko have won one Czech Cup, and reached the cup final on two other occasions.

== History ==
Established in 1927 as SK Staré Město in Staré Město, the club played exclusively in the lower levels of Czechoslovak and later Czech football.

Staré Město won the Moravian–Silesian Football League in the 1996–97 season and were promoted to the Czech 2. Liga in 1997. The club won promotion from the Czech 2. Liga in 2000, clinching promotion five matches before the end of the season. This marked the start of the club's first-ever spell in the country's top flight. The club merged with Slovácká Slavia Uherské Hradiště in 2000, the resultant club becoming 1. FC Synot. During the club's first seasons in the Czech First League, they took part in European competition a number of times, playing in the UEFA Intertoto Cup on three occasions. In the summer of 2004, the club officially changed its name to 1. FC Slovácko. Slovácko reached the final of the 2004–05 Czech Cup, losing 2–1 to winners Baník Ostrava.

The club played for seven years in the Czech First League before being relegated in 2007. The club went on to play two years in the second division, being promoted despite finishing 10th in the 2008–09 Czech 2. Liga, as second-placed side that season, Čáslav, sold Slovácko their license for the top flight. The same season, the club again reached the final of the Czech Cup, losing the final of the 2008–09 Czech Cup to Teplice.

In the 2021/22 season, the club finished in 4th place on 68 points ahead of FC Banik Ostrava in 5th. They also won the Czech Cup for the first time in the club's history after defeating Sparta Prague 3–1 with goals from Václav Jurečka and Petr Reinberk who scored twice, and qualified for the UEFA Europa League.

== Historical names ==
- 1927–1948: SK Staré Město
- 1948–1953: Sokol Staré Město
- 1953–1993: Jiskra Staré Město
- 1993: SFK Staré Město
- 1994–1999: FC Synot Staré Město
- 1999–2000: FC Synot
- 2000–2004: 1. FC Synot (after merger with Slovácká Slavia Uherské Hradiště)
- 2004–present: 1. FC Slovácko

== Players ==
=== Current squad ===
As of 7 September 2026

Note: Flags indicate national team as defined under FIFA eligibility rules; some limited exceptions apply. Players may hold more than one non-FIFA nationality.

No.	Pos.	Nation	Player
2	DF	ANG	Gigli Ndefe
3	DF	SRB	Milan Rundić
4	DF	MKD	Andrej Stojchevski
5	DF	SVK	Filip Vaško
6	MF	SVK	Martin Šviderský
7	FW	GRE	Giannis Niarchos
8	MF	CZE	Daniel Tetour
9	MF	ARG	Alan Marinelli
10	MF	CZE	Michal Trávník
11	FW	CZE	Filip Horský
15	MF	SVK	Patrik Blahút
16	FW	GAM	Gibril Sosseh (on loan from Slavia Prague)
17	MF	CZE	Filip Hruška
18	FW	CZE	Jan Fiala (on loan from Sigma Olomouc)
19	DF	CZE	Tomáš Král (on loan from Mladá Boleslav)

No.	Pos.	Nation	Player
20	MF	CZE	Marek Havlík
21	DF	CZE	Šimon Slončík (on loan from Slavia Prague)
22	DF	CIV	Jocelin Behiratche
23	DF	CZE	David Štěpánek
25	DF	NGR	Paul Ndubuisi
26	MF	MKD	Tihomir Kostadinov (on loan from Sigma Olomouc)
27	MF	LTU	Artūr Dolžnikov (on loan from Sigma Olomouc)
28	DF	CZE	Leoš Prior
29	GK	CZE	Milan Heča
30	FW	CZE	David Puškáč
33	GK	CZE	Alexandr Urban
34	GK	CZE	Pavel Halouska
72	MF	CZE	Lukáš Vorlický
77	MF	CZE	Pavel Juroška

=== Out on loan ===
Note: Flags indicate national team as defined under FIFA eligibility rules; some limited exceptions apply. Players may hold more than one non-FIFA nationality.

No. / Pos. / Nation / Player; — / DF / ISR / Jonathan Mulder (at Trenčín)	No. / Pos. / Nation / Player; — / DF / CZE / Oliver Štecha (at Kroměříž)

== Reserves ==
As of 2025–26, the club's reserve team 1. FC Slovácko B plays in the Moravian-Silesian Football League (3rd tier of Czech football system).

== Player records in the Czech First League ==
As of 18 September 2026.

Highlighted players are in the current squad.

=== Most appearances ===
#	Name	Matches
1	(Czech Republic) Marek Havlík	391
2	(Czech Republic) Petr Reinberk	371
3	(Czech Republic) Vlastimil Daníček	352
4	(Czech Republic) Stanislav Hofmann	262
5	(Czech Republic) Milan Petržela	245
6	(Czech Republic) Milan Heča	211
7	(Czech Republic) Michal Kadlec	190
8	(Czech Republic) Petr Drobisz	186
9	(Czech Republic) Pavel Němčický	182
10	(Czech Republic) Michal Trávník	177

=== Most goals ===
#	Name	Goals
1	(Czech Republic) Libor Došek	52
2	(Czech Republic) Marek Havlík	43
3	(Czech Republic) Vlastimil Daníček	39
4	(Czech Republic) Jiří Kowalík	34
5	(Czech Republic) Tomáš Zajíc	26
6	(Czech Republic) Václav Jurečka	25
7	(Slovakia) Milan Ivana	22
7	(Czech Republic) Stanislav Hofmann	22
9	(Czech Republic) Jan Kalabiška	21
9	(Czech Republic) Milan Petržela	21

=== Most clean sheets ===
#	Name	Clean sheets
1	(Czech Republic) Petr Drobisz	56
2	(Czech Republic) Milan Heča	53
3	(Czech Republic) Matouš Trmal	22

== Managers ==
- František Komňacký (1997–2001)
- Dušan Radolský (2001–2002)
- Milan Bokša (2002)
- Radek Rabušic (2002–2003)
- Karel Jarolím (July 2003 – June 2005)
- Ladislav Molnár (Dec 2004 – Nov 2005)
- Stanislav Levý (Nov 2005 – June 2006)
- Jiří Plíšek (June – Nov 2006)
- Pavel Malura (Nov 2006 – Jan 2008)
- Leoš Kalvoda (Jan – July 2008)
- Ladislav Jurkemik (July – Dec 2008)
- Josef Mazura (Dec 2008 – Dec 2009)
- Miroslav Soukup (Jan 2010 – Aug 2012)
- Svatopluk Habanec (Aug 2012 – May 2016)
- Stanislav Levý (June 2016 – Sep 2017)
- Michal Kordula (Sep 2017 – Oct 2018)
- Petr Vlachovský (Oct 2018 – Nov 2018)
- Martin Svědík (Nov 2018 – June 2024)
- Roman West (June 2024 – Oct 2024)
- Ondřej Smetana (Nov 2024 – March 2025)
- Tomáš Palinek (Apr 2025 – May 2025)
- Jan Kameník (May 2025 – Nov 2025)
- Roman Skuhravý (Nov 2025 – June 2026)
- Jan Jelínek (June 2026 – present)

== History in domestic competitions ==
- 1993–97 Moravian–Silesian Football League
- 1997–00 Czech 2. Liga
- 2000–07 Czech First League
- 2007–09 Czech 2. Liga
- 2009– Czech First League

- Seasons spent at Level 1 of the football league system: 23
- Seasons spent at Level 2 of the football league system: 5
- Seasons spent at Level 3 of the football league system: 4

=== Czech Republic ===
Season	League	Placed	Pld	W	D	L	GF	GA	GD	Pts	Cup
1993–94	3. liga	6th	30	14	5	11	44	38	+6	33	
1994–95	3. liga	4th	30	14	8	8	44	33	+11	50	
1995–96	3. liga	4th	28	13	7	8	52	40	+12	46	
1996–97	3. liga	1st	28	20	6	2	61	22	+39	66	
1997–98	2. liga	4th	30	14	4	10	42	34	+8	46	Round of 32
1998–99	2. liga	3rd	30	20	7	3	64	26	+38	67	Round of 64
1999–00	2. liga	1st	30	24	4	2	76	29	+47	76	Round of 64
2000–01	1. liga	11th	30	9	10	11	37	35	+2	37	Round of 16
2001–02	1. liga	11th	30	10	6	14	31	38	–7	36	Round of 32
2002–03	1. liga	8th	30	11	7	12	39	40	–1	40	Round of 32
2003–04	1. liga	5th	30	14	6	10	43	37	+6	48	Round of 32
2004–05	1. liga	13th	30	10	14	6	30	22	+8	32†	Runners-up
2005–06	1. liga	7th	30	9	11	10	29	28	+1	38	Quarter-finals
2006–07	1. liga	16th	30	3	10	17	20	39	–19	19	Quarter-finals
2007–08	2. liga	5th	30	13	9	8	40	27	+13	48	Round of 32
2008–09	2. liga	10th	30	9	12	9	25	29	–4	39	Runners-up
2009–10	1. liga	14th	30	8	6	16	28	42	–14	30	Round of 64
2010–11	1. liga	12th	30	8	7	15	27	43	–16	31	Round of 64
2011–12	1. liga	7th	30	12	5	13	29	32	–3	41	Round of 16
2012–13	1. liga	9th	30	10	7	13	37	41	–4	37	Quarter-finals
2013–14	1. liga	6th	30	11	7	12	43	40	+3	40	Round of 16
2014–15	1. liga	9th	30	10	7	13	43	46	–3	37	Quarter-finals
2015–16	1. liga	8th	30	12	4	14	37	51	–14	40	Round of 64
2016–17	1. liga	12th	30	6	14	10	29	38	–9	32	Round of 32
2017–18	1. liga	12th	30	6	13	11	23	32	–9	31	Quarter-finals
2018–19	1. liga	11th	35	13	6	16	43	47	–4	45	Round of 16
2019–20	1. liga	10th	32	11	9	12	37	39	–2	42	Quarter-finals
2020–21	1. liga	4th	34	19	6	9	58	33	+25	63	Round of 16
2021–22	1. liga	4th	34	21	5	9	57	37	+20	63	Winners
2022–23	1. liga	5th	35	13	11	11	40	46	–6	50	Quarter-finals
2023–24	1. liga	6th	35	12	8	15	45	56	–11	44	Round of 32
2024–25	1. liga	13th	35	9	11	15	31	56	–25	38	Round of 32
2025–26	1. liga	14th	35	7	9	19	30	51	–21	30	Round of 16
2026–27	1. liga										Round of 16

Notes: † Twelve points were taken off from Slovácko as a result of proven corruption.

== Honours ==
- Czech Cup
  - Winners: 2021–22
  - Runners-up: 2004–05, 2008–09
- Czech 2. Liga
  - Winners: 1999–2000
- Moravian–Silesian Football League
  - Winners: 1996–97

== European record ==
Season	Competition	Round	Opposition	Home	Away	Aggregate
2001	UEFA Intertoto Cup	Second round	(Romania) Universitatea Craiova	3–2	2–2	5–4
2001	UEFA Intertoto Cup	Third round	(France) Rennes	4–2	0–5	4–7
2002	UEFA Intertoto Cup	First round	(Moldova) Tiraspol	4–0	0–0	4–0
2002	UEFA Intertoto Cup	Second round	(Sweden) Helsingborg	4–0	0–2	4–2
2002	UEFA Intertoto Cup	Third round	(France) Sochaux	0–3	0–0	0–3
2003	UEFA Intertoto Cup	Second round	(Serbia and Montenegro) OFK Beograd	1–0	3–3	4–3
2003	UEFA Intertoto Cup	Third round	(Germany) Wolfsburg	0–1	0–2	0–3
2021–22	UEFA Europa Conference League	Second qualifying round	(Bulgaria) Lokomotiv Plovdiv	1–0	0–1	1–1 (2–3 p)
2022–23	UEFA Europa League	Third qualifying round	(Turkey) Fenerbahçe	1–1	0–3	1–4
2022–23	UEFA Europa Conference League	Play-off round	(Sweden) AIK	3–0	1–0	4–0
2022–23	UEFA Europa Conference League	Group stage	(Serbia) Partizan	3–3	1–1	4th
2022–23	UEFA Europa Conference League	Group stage	(Germany) 1. FC Köln	0–1	2–4	4th
2022–23	UEFA Europa Conference League	Group stage	(France) Nice	0–1	2–1	4th

== Club records ==
=== Czech First League records ===
- Best position: 4th (2020–21, 2021–22)
- Worst position: 16th (2006–07)
- Biggest home win: Slovácko 5–0 Plzeň (2000–01), Slovácko 5–0 Hradec Králové (2002–03), Slovácko 5–0 Brno (2013–14)
- Biggest away win: Příbram 0–4 Slovácko (2011–12), Teplice 0–4 Slovácko (2012–13)
- Biggest home defeat: Slovácko 0–4 Ostrava (2001–02), Slovácko 0–4 Zlín (2018–19)
- Biggest away defeat: Brno 7–0 Slovácko (2010–11)
