= FK Teplice =

Czech professional football club

Teplice
- Full name: Fotbalový klub Teplice a.s.
- Nicknames: Skláři (Glassblowers)
- Founded: June 1945; 81 years ago
- Ground: Na Stínadlech, Teplice
- Capacity: 17,078
- Chairman: Pavel Šedlbauer
- Manager: Zdenko Frťala
- League: Czech First League
- 2025–26: 11th of 16
- Website: www.fkteplice.cz
Home colours	Away colours

FK Teplice is a Czech professional football club based in the city of Teplice. The club competes in Czech First League, the top tier of Czech football.

The club was founded after World War II in 1945. The club advanced to the Czechoslovak First League in just three years after being founded and played mostly in the First and Second Czechoslovak divisions. After the Velvet Revolution and comeback of rich sponsor, Glaverbel (spun out of glassworks Sklo Union in 1991), the club played in the Second Division until returning to the top flight in the 1996–97 Czech First League. Teplice were runners up in the 1998–99 Czech First League and went on to play in the 1999–2000 UEFA Champions League, although they lost their first match against Borussia Dortmund. The club subsequently won the Czech Cup in 2003 and went on to beat Kaiserslautern and Feyenoord en route to the third round of the 2003–04 UEFA Cup before losing over two legs against Celtic.

== History ==
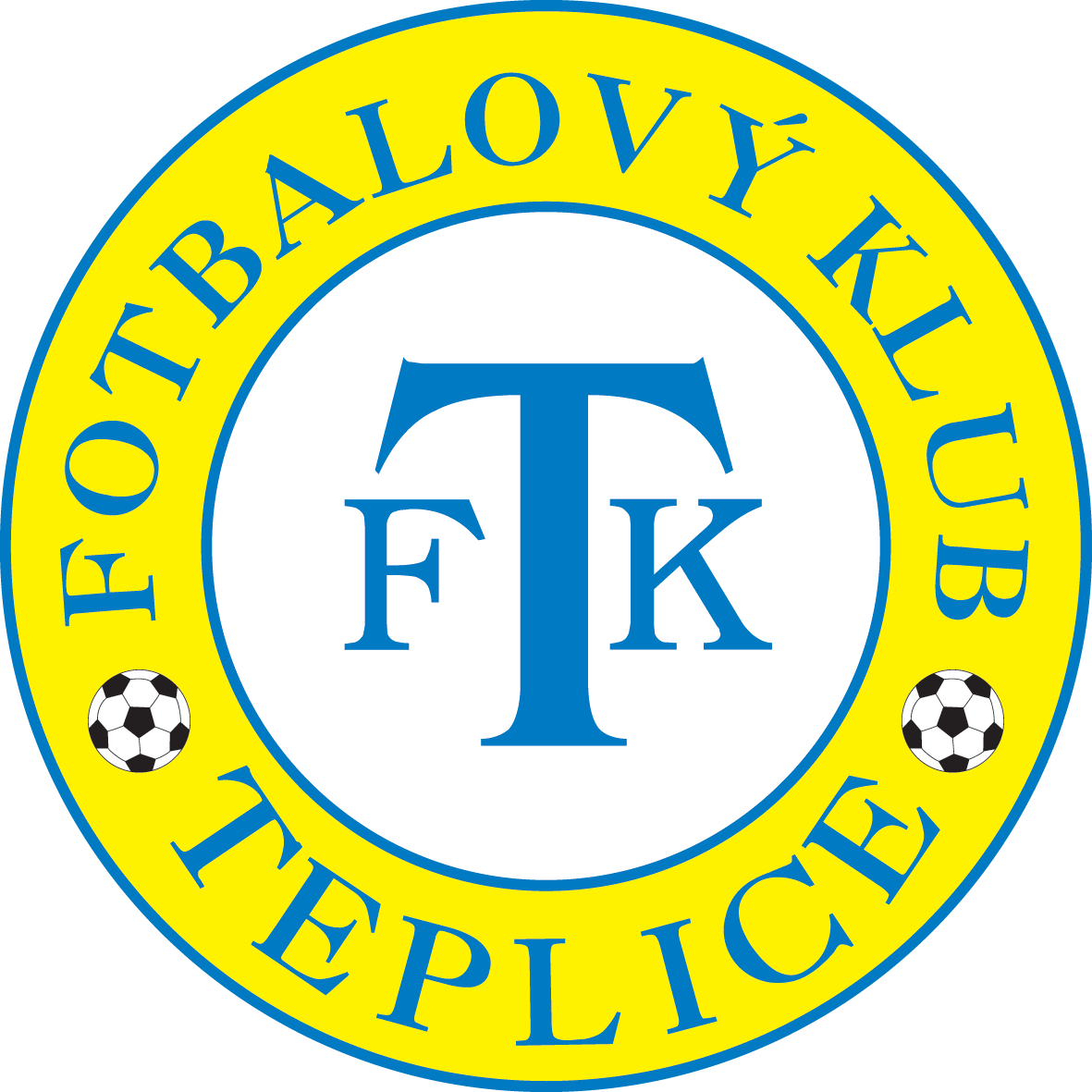
Club logo until 2023

=== Recent history ===
The club's best league position was second in the 1998–99 season. In the 2004–05 season the team finished third, with the same number of points as second-place Slavia Prague. The finish allowed them to play in the third round of the UEFA Cup qualification, which Teplice won against MTZ-RIPO Minsk. In the first round of the UEFA Cup Teplice faced Espanyol. They were eliminated after drawing 1–1 in the first leg and losing 0–2 in the second leg.

In the 2007–08 season the team finished in fifth place in the Czech First League. The result earned them a place in the 2008 Intertoto Cup. However they lost on away goals in their first fixture, against Budapest Honvéd FC.

In 2009 Teplice again won the cup, qualifying yet again for European competition, this time the newly branded 2009–10 UEFA Europa League. However they went out in their first fixture, a 2–3 aggregate loss against Hapoel Tel Aviv.

== Historical names ==
- 1945 — SK Teplice-Šanov (Sportovní klub Teplice-Šanov)
- 1948 — Sokol Teplice
- 1949 — ZSJ Technomat Teplice (Základní sportovní jednota Technomat Teplice)
- 1951 — ZSJ Vodotechna Teplice (Základní sportovní jednota Vodotechna Teplice)
- 1952 — ZSJ Ingstav Teplice (Základní sportovní jednota Ingstav Teplice)
- 1953 — DSO Tatran Teplice (Dobrovolná sportovní organizace Tatran Teplice)
- 1960 — TJ Slovan Teplice (Tělovýchovná jednota Slovan Teplice)
- 1966 — TJ Sklo Union Teplice (Tělovýchovná jednota Sklo Union Teplice)
- 1991 — TFK VTJ Teplice (Tělovýchovný fotbalový klub Vojenská tělovýchovná jednota Teplice)
- 1993 — FK Frydrych Teplice (Fotbalový klub Frydrych Teplice)
- 1994 — FK Teplice (Fotbalový klub Teplice, a.s.)

== Players ==
=== Current squad ===
As of 8 September 2026.

Note: Flags indicate national team as defined under FIFA eligibility rules; some limited exceptions apply. Players may hold more than one non-FIFA nationality.

No.	Pos.	Nation	Player
1	GK	CZE	Luděk Němeček
3	MF	CZE	Josef Švanda
4	DF	LAT	Oskars Vientiess
5	DF	SVK	Jakub Jakubko
6	MF	CZE	Michal Bílek
7	FW	GAM	Abdourahman Badamosi
8	MF	CZE	Jan Fortelný
10	FW	CZE	Matěj Pulkrab
11	FW	CZE	Matyáš Kozák
12	MF	CZE	Marcel Čermák
13	DF	UKR	Denys Taraduda
14	MF	CZE	Ladislav Krejčí
15	DF	CZE	Jaroslav Harušťák
16	MF	CZE	Petr Kodeš
17	MF	NGR	John Auta
19	MF	CZE	Robert Jukl

No.	Pos.	Nation	Player
20	MF	UKR	Artem Garzha
21	FW	CZE	Idris Hopi
22	DF	CZE	Ladislav Takács
23	MF	CZE	Lukáš Mareček
24	FW	CZE	Pavel Svatek
25	MF	SVK	Matej Riznič
26	DF	SVK	Daniel Danihel
27	FW	CZE	Matěj Náprstek
28	DF	CZE	Dalibor Večerka
29	GK	CZE	Matouš Trmal
31	GK	CZE	Kryštof Lichtenberg
32	DF	CZE	Sebastian Pech
33	FW	CZE	Tomáš Zlatohlávek
34	DF	LTU	Nojus Vytis Audinis
35	MF	CZE	Matěj Radosta
37	MF	CZE	Daniel Mareček

=== Out on loan ===
Note: Flags indicate national team as defined under FIFA eligibility rules; some limited exceptions apply. Players may hold more than one non-FIFA nationality.

No.	Pos.	Nation	Player
—	FW	CZE	Tadeáš Vachoušek (at Zbrojovka Brno)
—	DF	UKR	Yehor Tsykalo (at Stal Mielec)

No.	Pos.	Nation	Player
—	MF	CZE	Marek Beránek (at Slovan Galanta)

== Reserves ==
As of 2025–26, the club's reserve team FK Teplice B plays in the Bohemian Football League (3rd tier of Czech football system).

== Player records in the Czech First League ==
As of 18 September 2026.

Highlighted players are in the current squad.

=== Most appearances ===
#	Name	Matches
1	(Czech Republic) Pavel Verbíř	379
2	(Czech Republic) Tomáš Grigar	352
3	(Czech Republic) Tomáš Vondrášek	346
4	(Bosnia and Herzegovina) Admir Ljevaković	306
5	(Czech Republic) Štěpán Vachoušek	270
6	(Czech Republic) Michal Doležal	268
7	(Czech Republic) Daniel Trubač	231
8	(Czech Republic) Dušan Tesařík	202
9	(Czech Republic) Tomáš Kučera	178
10	(Czech Republic) Martin Klein	174

=== Most goals ===
#	Name	Goals
1	(Czech Republic) Pavel Verbíř	76
2	(Bosnia and Herzegovina) Aidin Mahmutović	58
3	(Czech Republic) Radek Divecký	41
4	(Czech Republic) Jakub Mareš	37
5	(Czech Republic) Štěpán Vachoušek	35
6	(Czech Republic) Jakub Hora	25
7	(Czech Republic) David Vaněček	24
8	(Republic of the Congo) Francis Litsingi	23
8	(Czech Republic) Daniel Trubač	23
10	(Czech Republic) Michal Kolomazník	22
10	(Czech Republic) Martin Fillo	22

=== Most clean sheets ===
#	Name	Clean sheets
1	(Czech Republic) Tomáš Grigar	105
2	(Czech Republic) Libor Macháček	53
3	(Czech Republic) Tomáš Poštulka	52

== Managers ==
- Zdeněk Šteflík (1945–46)
- Rudolf Krčil (1947–48)
- Rudolf Vytlačil (1948–50)
- Kuželík (1950–51)
- Rudolf Krčil (1952–62)
- Vlastimil Chobot (1962–65)
- Jan Kalous (1965–66)
- Antonín Rýgr (1966–70)
- Josef Forejt (1970–73)
- Antonín Rýgr (1973–77)
- Karel Bílek (1977–79)
- Vladimír Mirka (1979–81)
- František Cerman (1981–83)
- Milan Kollár (1983–84)
- Josef Zadina (1984–85)
- Karel Vytisk (1985–86)
- Jiří Rubáš (1986–87)
- František Cerman (1987–89)
- Jaromír Mixa (1989–91)
- Milan Bokša (1991–93)
- František Cerman (1993–97)
- Josef Pešice (1997–00)
- Petr Rada (July 2000 – March 2001)
- Michal Bílek (2001)
- Dušan Uhrin (July 2001 – Aug 2001)
- František Cipro (Dec 2001 – Oct 2002)
- František Straka (Sept 2002 – March 2004)
- Jiří Nevrlý (2004)
- Jan Poštulka (2004)
- Vlastislav Mareček (July 2004 – 2006)
- Jiří Bartl (2007)
- Petr Rada (July 2007 – July 2008)
- Jiří Plíšek (July 2008 – June 2011)
- Petr Rada (July 2011 – June 2012)
- Lukáš Přerost (July 2012 – Sept 2012)
- Zdeněk Ščasný (Oct 2012 – Feb 2015)
- Petr Rada (Feb 2015 – May 2015)
- David Vavruška (June 2015 – May 2016)
- Daniel Šmejkal (June 2016 – Sept 2018)
- Stanislav Hejkal (Sept 2018 – Nov 2020)
- Radim Kučera (November 2020 – Sept 2021)
- Jiří Jarošík (September 2021 – March 2023)
- Zdenko Frťala (March 2023 – present)

== History in domestic competitions ==
- 1993–1996 Czech 2. Liga
- 1996– Czech First League

- Seasons spent at Level 1 of the football league system: 29
- Seasons spent at Level 2 of the football league system: 3
- Seasons spent at Level 3 of the football league system: 0
- Seasons spent at Level 4 of the football league system: 0

=== Czech Republic ===
Season	League	Placed	Pld	W	D	L	GF	GA	GD	Pts	Cup
1993–94	2. liga	8th	30	10	10	10	37	36	+1	30	Round of 32
1994–95	2. liga	4th	34	16	4	14	55	47	+8	52	Round of 32
1995–96	2. liga	2nd	30	16	8	6	41	23	+18	56	Semi-finals
1996–97	1. liga	13th	30	6	10	14	21	37	–16	28	Round of 32
1997–98	1. liga	7th	30	10	10	10	36	30	+6	40	Round of 16
1998–99	1. liga	2nd	30	16	7	7	55	30	+25	55	Round of 16
1999–00	1. liga	5th	30	10	11	9	38	38	0	41	Round of 64
2000–01	1. liga	8th	30	12	4	14	45	39	+6	40	Quarter-finals
2001–02	1. liga	7th	30	12	5	13	37	41	–4	41	Quarter-finals
2002–03	1. liga	6th	30	13	6	11	33	32	+1	45	Winners
2003–04	1. liga	9th	30	9	12	9	32	32	0	39	Quarter-finals
2004–05	1. liga	3rd	30	14	11	5	36	27	+9	53	Quarter-finals
2005–06	1. liga	4th	30	12	16	2	38	24	+14	52	Round of 16
2006–07	1. liga	8th	30	11	9	10	44	39	+5	42	Round of 16
2007–08	1. liga	5th	30	16	5	9	40	27	+13	53	Round of 32
2008–09	1. liga	7th	30	12	7	11	33	25	+8	43	Winners
2009–10	1. liga	4th	30	15	10	5	44	25	+19	55	Quarter-finals
2010–11	1. liga	10th	30	10	9	11	39	46	–7	39	Quarter-finals
2011–12	1. liga	5th	30	12	10	8	36	30	+6	46	Semi-finals
2012–13	1. liga	12th	30	8	8	14	36	47	–11	32	Quarter-finals
2013–14	1. liga	5th	30	13	7	10	51	35	+16	46	Round of 64
2014–15	1. liga	7th	30	9	11	10	41	37	+4	38	Semi-finals
2015–16	1. liga	12th	30	7	9	14	37	52	–15	30	Round of 32
2016–17	1. liga	5th	30	13	9	8	38	25	+13	48	Round of 64
2017–18	1. liga	8th	30	8	10	12	32	40	–8	34	Round of 16
2018–19	1. liga	10th	32	10	7	15	33	51	–18	37	Quarter-finals
2019–20	1. liga	12th	33	9	11	13	37	51	–14	38	Round of 16
2020–21	1. liga	15th	34	7	9	18	34	66	–22	30	Semi-finals
2021–22	1. liga	15th	35	8	5	22	33	59	–26	29	Round of 16
2022–23	1. liga	12th	35	11	9	15	45	67	–22	42	Round of 16
2023–24	1. liga	8th	34	11	11	12	35	44	–9	42	Round of 32
2024–25	1. liga	11th	35	12	8	15	41	45	–4	44	Quarter-finals
2025–26	1. liga	11th	35	10	12	13	40	42	–2	42	Round of 32
2026–27	1. liga										Round of 16

== History in European competitions ==
The following is a list of the all-time statistics from Teplice's games in the three UEFA tournaments it has participated in, as well as the overall total. The list contains the tournament, the number of seasons (S), games played (P), won (W), drawn (D) and lost (L). The statistics include qualification matches.

As of 30 June 2012.

Tournament	S	P	W	D	L
Champions League	1	2	0	0	2
Europa League / UEFA Cup	5	18	6	4	8
Intertoto Cup	4	14	5	0	9
Total	9	34	11	4	19

== Honours ==
=== Domestic ===
- Czech Cup
  - Winners: 2002–03, 2008–09
- Czech First League
  - Runner-up: 1998–99

== Club records ==
=== Czech First League records ===
- Best position: 2nd (1998–99)
- Worst position: 15th (2020–21, 2021–22)
- Biggest home win: Teplice 5–0 Kladno (2009–10), Teplice 5–0 Mladá Boleslav (2014–15)
- Biggest away win: Slavia 0–7 Teplice (2013–14)
- Biggest home defeat: Teplice 0–8 Mladá Boleslav (2018–19)
- Biggest away defeat: Plzeň 7–0 Teplice (2020–21)
