= 2004–05 Czech 2. Liga =

2. česká fotbalová liga
- Season: 2004–05
- Champions: Most
- Promoted: Most; Vysočina Jihlava; Viktoria Plzeň
- Relegated: Tatran Prachatice; Bohemians
- Matches: 210
- Goals: 509 (2.42 per match)
- Top goalscorer: Horst Siegl (16)
- Average attendance: 737

The 2004–05 Czech 2. Liga was the 12th season of the 2. česká fotbalová liga, the second tier of the Czech football league. Following a corruption scandal, Viktoria Žižkov were deducted 12 points. Vítkovice also received a points deduction: for bribery in two of their matches the previous season, they were deducted 9 points. In February 2005, Bohemians lost their license to play in the league and thus their results were expunged and the second half of the season was played with only 15 teams.

In May 2005, Most, led by head coach Přemysl Bičovský, celebrated promotion to the Czech First League for the first time, after beating Sparta Prague B. The final round of matches, originally scheduled to take place at a weekend, was moved back to Thursday, 9 June, after the league's board intervened. That day, Vysočina Jihlava became the second team to secure promotion to the Czech First League, also for the first time. FK Tatran Prachatice were relegated despite winning their final match. After the end of the season, Viktoria Plzeň became the third team to be promoted, administratively replacing FK Drnovice, who were refused a professional license for the following season.

Horst Siegl of Most was the league's top scorer with 16 goals, one ahead of Pavel Simr of Vysočina Jihlava. After scoring just four goals in the first half of the season, Siegl added 12 in the spring part of the campaign.

== Team changes ==
=== From 2. Liga ===
Promoted to Czech First League

- FK Mladá Boleslav
- FK Drnovice

Relegated to Bohemian Football League

- SC Xaverov

Relegated to Moravian–Silesian Football League

- 1. HFK Olomouc

=== To 2. Liga ===
Relegated from Czech First League

- FK Viktoria Žižkov
- FC Viktoria Plzeň

Promoted from Bohemian Football League

- MFK Ústí nad Labem

Promoted from Moravian–Silesian Football League

- SK Hanácká Slavia Kroměříž

== League standings ==
Pos	Team	Pld	W	D	L	GF	GA	GD	Pts	Promotion or relegation
1	Most (C, P)	28	17	10	1	58	30	+28	61	Promotion to 2005–06 1. Liga
2	Vysočina Jihlava (P)	28	13	9	6	46	30	+16	48	Promotion to 2005–06 1. Liga
3	Viktoria Plzeň (P)	28	12	10	6	32	23	+9	46	Promotion to 2005–06 1. Liga
4	Kladno	28	11	10	7	37	22	+15	43	
5	Brno B	28	10	6	12	33	31	+2	36	
6	Viktoria Žižkov (Note: Viktoria Žižkov were deducted 12 points.)	28	14	4	10	42	36	+6	34 (Note: VŽI 3–1 HRA; HRA 3–2 VŽI)	
7	Hradec Králové	28	9	7	12	37	38	−1	34	
8	Kunovice	28	8	9	11	29	42	−13	33 (Note: KUN 1–1 VIT; VIT 0–1 KUN)	
9	Vítkovice (Note: Vítkovice were deducted 9 points.)	28	10	12	6	35	30	+5	33	
10	Sparta Prague B	28	7	11	10	24	30	−6	32	
11	Sigma Olomouc B	28	7	10	11	32	39	−7	31	
12	Ústí nad Labem	28	7	9	12	27	40	−13	30	
13	Slavia Kroměříž	28	6	10	12	29	45	−16	28	
14	Pardubice	28	6	9	13	20	34	−14	27	
15	Tatran Prachatice (R)	28	6	8	14	28	39	−11	26	Relegation to 2005–06 ČFL

Source: The Football Association of the Czech Republic
Rules for classification: 1) points; 2) head-to-head points; 3) head-to-head goal difference; 4) head-to-head goals scored; 5) goal difference; 6) number of goals scored.
(C) Champions; (P) Promoted; (R) Relegated

== Top goalscorers ==
Rank	Scorer	Club	Goals
1	(Czech Republic) Horst Siegl	Most	16
2	(Czech Republic) Pavel Simr	Vysočina Jihlava	15
3	(Czech Republic) Petr Mikolanda	Viktoria Žižkov	13
4	(Czech Republic) Tomáš Pilař	Most	10
4	(Czech Republic) Michal Zachariáš	Kladno	10
6	(Slovakia) Martin Prohászka	Viktoria Žižkov	11
7	(Czech Republic) Adam Brzezina	Most	10
8	(Czech Republic) Petr Faldyna	Kunovice	8
8	(Slovakia) Jaroslav Prekop	SK Sigma Olomouc B	8
8	(Slovakia) Peter Štyvar	Ústí nad Labem	8

== See also ==
- 2004–05 Czech First League
- 2004–05 Czech Cup
