= Svatopluk Habanec =

Czech footballer and manager (born 1969)

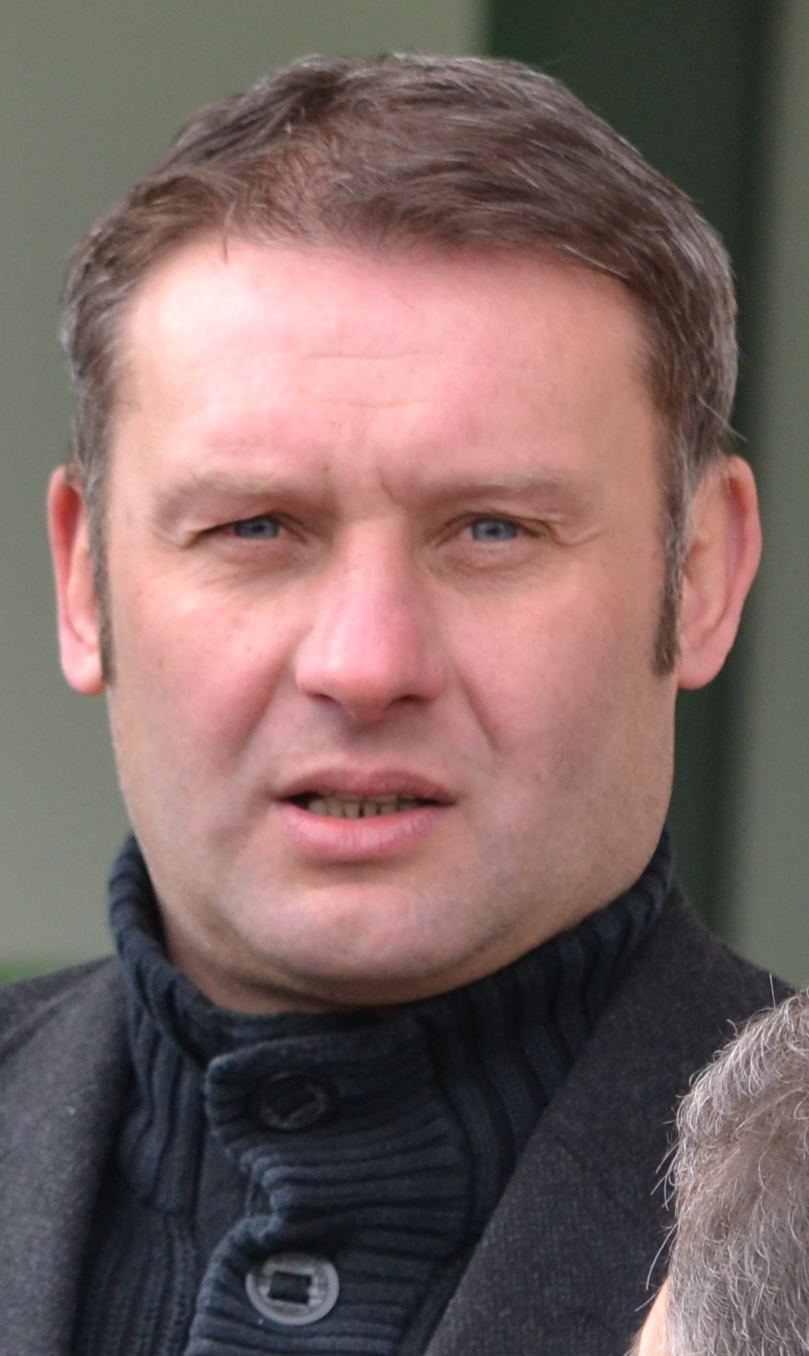
- Habanec in 2013

Personal information
- Date of birth: 22 September 1969 (age 57)
- Place of birth: Brno, Czechoslovakia
- Position: Defender

Senior career*
Years	Team	Apps	(Gls)
1993–1997	Teplice	182	(31)
1997–2001	Chomutov		
2001–2002	Teplice		

Managerial career
- 2004–2006: Teplice
- 2007–2012: Ústí nad Labem
- 2012–2016: Slovácko
- 2016–2017: Brno
- 2019–2020: Třinec
- 2024–2026: Ústí nad Labem
- 2026: Opava
- * Club domestic league appearances and goals

Svatopluk Habanec (born 22 September 1969) is a Czech former football player and manager. His playing position was defender.

Habanec scored 11 goals in 28 games in the 2000–01 Czech 2. Liga, finishing among the leading scorers of the league.

He was announced as the new manager of Ústí nad Labem on 19 September 2007, replacing Libor Pala. He guided Ústí to the Czech First League after masterminding a second-place finish for the club in the 2009–10 Czech 2. Liga. Despite their relegation from the Czech First League in 2010/11, Habanec won the Czech 2. Liga with Ústí the following season. In August 2012, Habanec was appointed as the successor to Miroslav Soukup at Czech First League side 1. FC Slovácko.

On 15 June 2024, Habanec was announced as the new manager of Ústí nad Labem.

On 16 June 2026, Habanec was appointed manager of Opava.

== Honours ==
=== Managerial ===
Ústí nad Labem

- Czech 2. Liga Winners (1): 2011–12
- Czech 2. Liga Runners-Up (1): 2009–10
