= 2003–04 Czech 2. Liga =

2. česká fotbalová liga
- Season: 2003–04
- Champions: Mladá Boleslav
- Promoted: Mladá Boleslav; Drnovice
- Relegated: 1. HFK Olomouc; Xaverov
- Matches: 240
- Goals: 545 (2.27 per match)
- Top goalscorer: Tomáš Kaplan, Roman Bednář, Vojtěch Schulmeister (10 goals)
- Average attendance: 1,097

The 2003–04 Czech 2. Liga was the 11th season of the 2. česká fotbalová liga, the second tier of the Czech football league.

Promotion was secured by Drnovice after the 29th round of matches on 29 May 2004, after Mladá Boleslav had secured promotion in the previous round. Prachatice escaped relegation by winning on the last day of the season, defeating Kunovice 3–1.

== League standings ==
Pos	Team	Pld	W	D	L	GF	GA	GD	Pts	Promotion or relegation
1	Mladá Boleslav (C, P)	30	16	7	7	50	24	+26	55	Promotion to 2004–05 1. Liga
2	Drnovice (P)	30	15	9	6	34	22	+12	54	Promotion to 2004–05 1. Liga
3	Bohemians Prague	30	13	12	5	37	21	+16	51	
4	Kladno	30	15	5	10	47	27	+20	50	
5	Pardubice	30	14	4	12	40	35	+5	46 (Note: PAR 2–0 JIH; JIH 1–2 PAR)	
6	Jihlava	30	12	10	8	40	33	+7	46	
7	Hradec Králové	30	9	12	9	27	30	−3	39	
8	Sparta Prague B	30	9	11	10	32	24	+8	38 (Note: SPA 4–0 MOS; MOS 0–3 SPA)	
9	Most	30	11	5	14	33	34	−1	38	
10	Vítkovice	30	9	10	11	28	36	−8	37	
11	Brno B	30	11	3	16	36	40	−4	36	
12	Sigma Olomouc B	30	9	8	13	40	51	−11	35	
13	Prachatice	30	9	7	14	31	49	−18	34	
14	Kunovice	30	9	6	15	25	43	−18	33	
15	HFK Olomouc (R)	30	7	11	12	21	35	−14	32 (Note: OLO 0–0 XAV; XAV 0–0 OLO)	Relegation to 2004–05 MSFL
16	Xaverov (R)	30	8	8	14	25	42	−17	32	Relegation to 2004–05 ČFL

Source: iDNES.cz
Rules for classification: 1) points; 2) head-to-head points; 3) head-to-head goal difference; 4) head-to-head goals scored; 5) goal difference; 6) number of goals scored.
(C) Champions; (P) Promoted; (R) Relegated

== Top goalscorers ==
Final standings

Rank	Scorer	Club	Goals
1	(Czech Republic) Tomáš Kaplan	Jihlava	10
1	(Czech Republic) Roman Bednář	Mladá Boleslav	10
1	(Czech Republic) Vojtěch Schulmeister	Sigma Olomouc B	10
4	(Czech Republic) Pavel Simr	Brno B	9
4	(Czech Republic) Radim Holub	Kladno	9
4	(Serbia and Montenegro) Vladimir Gluščević	Sparta B	9

== See also ==
- 2003–04 Czech First League
- 2003–04 Czech Cup
