= Tesařík =

Tesařík (feminine Tesaříková) is a Czech surname meaning "little carpenter", a diminutive of Tesař (carpenter). Notable people include:

- Dušan Tesařík, Czech footballer
- Richard Tesařík, Czech general
- Štěpán Tesařík, Czech athlete
