= Bedřich Hamsa =

Czech footballer

Personal information
- Date of birth: 25 October 1965 (age 61)
- Place of birth: Prague, Czechoslovakia
- Position: Forward

Senior career*
Years	Team	Apps	(Gls)
1987–1988	Slavia Prague	3	(0)
1989–1992	Bohemians Prague	53	(8)
1993–1994	Drnovice	26	(4)
1994–1995	LeRK Brno		
1995–1998	Teplice	18	(1)
1996–1997	→ Ústí nad Labem (loan)	15	(2)
1997–1998	→ Baník Most (loan)		
- * Club domestic league appearances and goals

Bedřich Hamsa (born 25 October 1965) is a Czech former football player. He played in the Czechoslovak First League for Slavia Prague and Bohemians Prague. Hamsa later played for Drnovice in the Czech First League, scoring four times in 26 matches in its inaugural season. He was top goal scorer in the 1994–95 Czech 2. Liga, scoring 22 goals for LeRK Brno that season. He subsequently played in the Czech 2. Liga for Teplice and Ústí nad Labem.

== Honours ==
=== Individual ===
- Czech 2. Liga top goalscorer: 1994–95
