= Košťany =

- Town
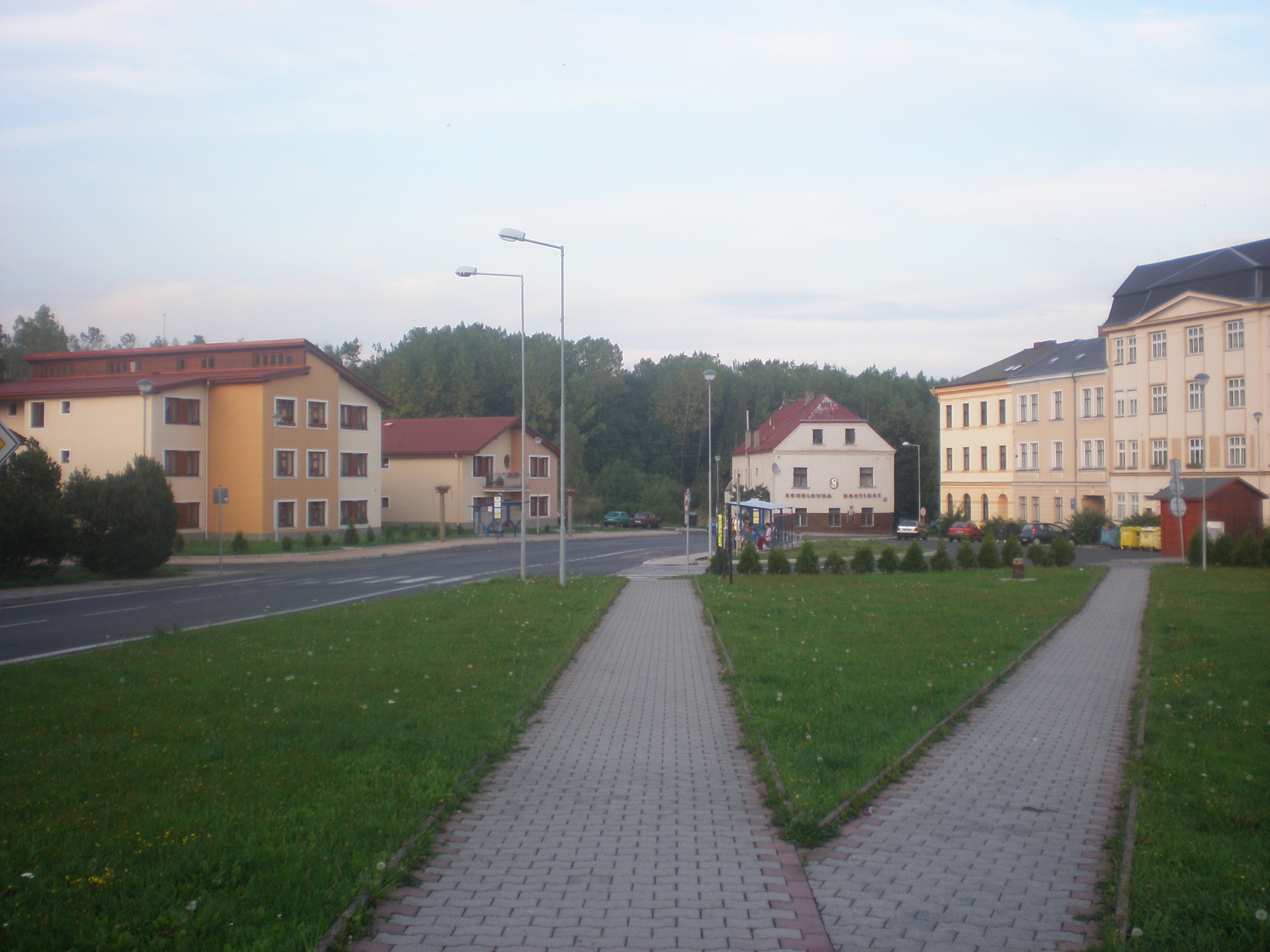
- The square Mírové náměstí

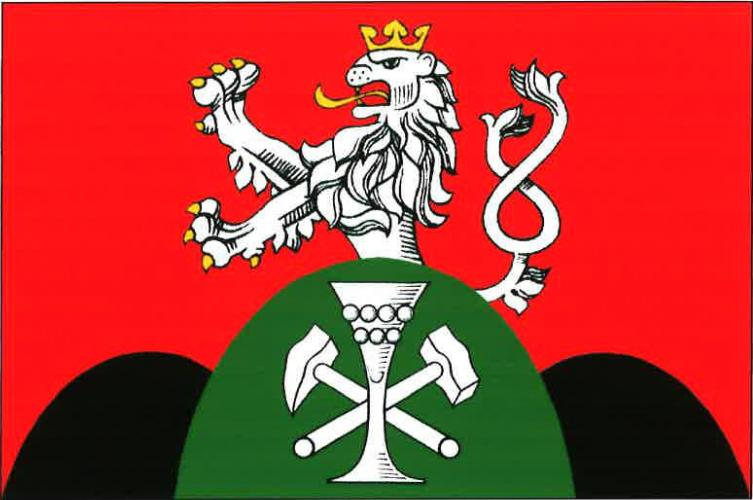
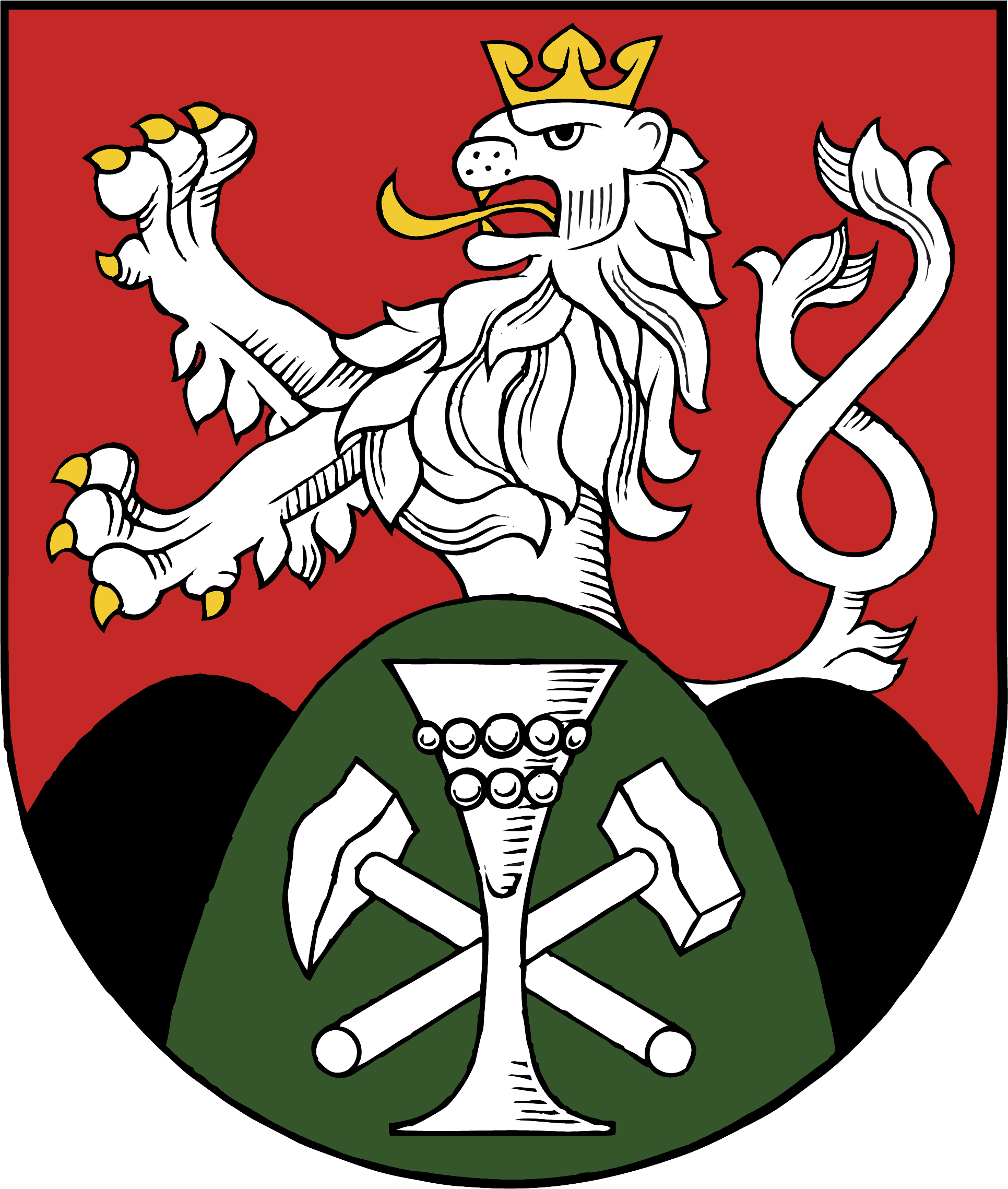
- Flag Coat of arms

- Location in the Czech Republic
- Coordinates: 50°39′33″N 13°45′26″E
- Country: Czech Republic
- Region: Ústí nad Labem
- District: Teplice
- First mentioned: 1394

Government
  - Mayor: Tomáš Sváda

Area
  - Total: 24.30 km^{2} (9.38 sq mi)
- Elevation: 250 m (820 ft)

Population (2026-01-01)
  - Total: 3,264
  - Density: 134.3/km^{2} (347.9/sq mi)
- Time zone: UTC+1 (CET)
  - Summer (DST): UTC+2 (CEST)
- Postal code: 417 23
- Website: www.kostany.cz

Košťany (Czech pronunciation: [ˈkoʃcanɪ]; German: Kosten) is a town in Teplice District in the Ústí nad Labem Region of the Czech Republic. It has about 3,300 inhabitants. The town is located on the stream Sviní potok, on the border between the Most Basin and Ore Mountains.

== Administrative division ==
Košťany consists of two municipal parts (in brackets population according to the 2021 census):

- Košťany (1,767)
- Střelná (1,371)

== Etymology ==
Both the Czech name Košťany and the German name Kosten were derived from the Old Czech word chvosten. The word chvost literally means 'tail', but in Old Czech it figuratively also meant 'thicket', 'bush'. Chvosten denoted a hill or a forest with thicket or bush.

== Geography ==
Košťany is located about 5 kilometres (3 mi) west of Teplice and 19 km (12 mi) west of Ústí nad Labem. The southern part of the municipal territory with the built-up area lies in the Most Basin. The northern part lies in the Ore Mountains and borders Germany. The highest point is the mountain Pramenáč at 910 m (2,990 ft) above sea level. The stream Sviní potok flows through the town.

== History ==
The first written mention of Košťany is from 1394. In 1994, Košťany received the town status.

== Demographics ==
Historical population

Year	Pop.	±%
1869	1,155	—
1880	2,017	+74.6%
1890	2,795	+38.6%
1900	4,213	+50.7%
1910	5,291	+25.6%

Year	Pop.	±%
1921	5,880	+11.1%
1930	6,675	+13.5%
1950	4,010	−39.9%
1961	4,521	+12.7%
1970	3,682	−18.6%

Year	Pop.	±%
1980	3,221	−12.5%
1991	2,494	−22.6%
2001	2,627	+5.3%
2011	2,833	+7.8%
2021	3,138	+10.8%

Source: Censuses

== Transport ==
The village of Střelná is located on the railway line Most–Moldava, but the line is only in operation on weekends.

== Sights ==
The only monument in the town is the Košťany Castle. It was built in the Historicist style at the end of the 18th century. It served as a hunting lodge of the Lobkowicz family and later as their summer residence. Between 1919 and 2010, it served as apartments. It is privately owned and inaccessible.

== Notable people ==
- Daniela Pejšová (born 2002), ice hockey player

== Twin towns – sister cities ==
Košťany is twinned with:

- Košťany nad Turcom, Slovakia
- Valaliky, Slovakia
