= Dusa (disambiguation) =

Dusa is a fictional character from the video game Hades.

Dusa or DUSA may also refer to:

== People ==
- David Dusa (born 1979), Swedish film director
- Ferdiš Duša (1888–1958), Czech painter
- Dusa McDuff (born 1945), British mathematician
- Cosmina Dușa (born 1990), Romanian football player
- Duša Počkaj (1924–1982), Slovenian actress

== Places ==
- Dusa (Numidia), an ancient city in Numidia, in present-day Algiers
- Duša, Bosnia and Herzegovina

== Other uses ==
- Dusa (crustacean), an extinct genus of prawns
- DUSA Pharmaceuticals, American company
- Deakin University Student Association, Australia
- Dundee University Students' Association, Scotland

== See also ==
- Dušan, a given name
