= Beskydy Mountain Academy =

School in the Czech Republic

Coordinates: 49.5881°N 18.3622°E

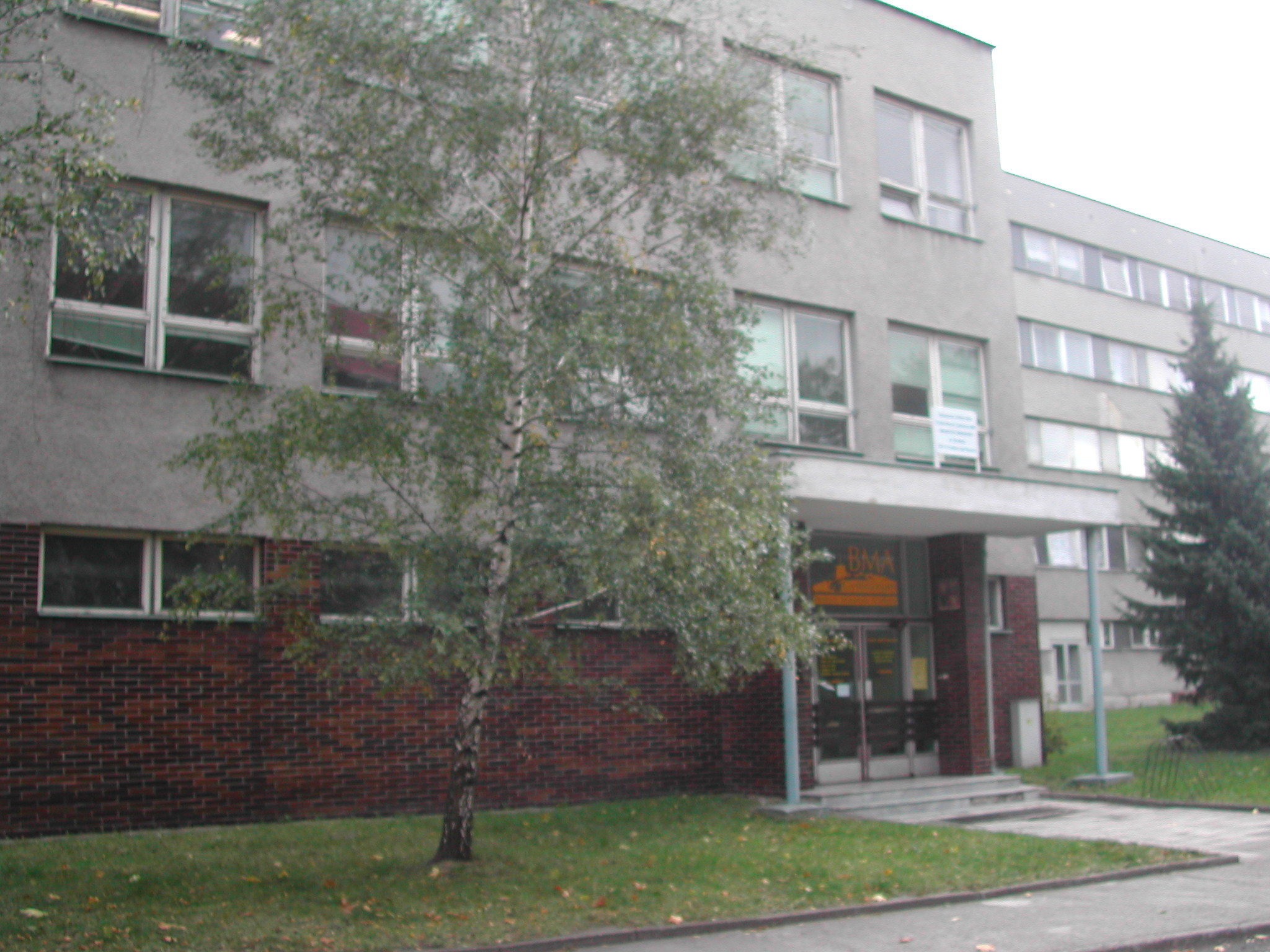

Information
- Established: 2003; 23 years ago
- Website: gymnaziumbma.edupage.org

Gymnázium Beskydy Mountain Academy is a private gymnasium in the Czech Republic. Located in the town of Frýdlant nad Ostravicí, it draws students from Frýdlant and neighboring towns such as Frýdek-Místek, Frenštát pod Radhoštěm, Ostravice, Metylovice, Hukvaldy and Čeladná, from the large cities of Ostrava and Havířov, and from more distant towns such as the border town of Třinec. It was founded in 2003.
