= Libor Pala =

Czech football coach (born 1961)

Personal information
- Date of birth: 22 July 1961 (age 65)
- Place of birth: Karviná, Czechoslovakia

Managerial career
- Years: Team
- 2000–2001: Karviná
- 2002–2003: Świt Nowy Dwór
- 2003: Lech Poznań
- 2004: Ruch Wysokie Mazowieckie
- 2006–2007: Pogoń Szczecin
- 2007: Ústí nad Labem
- 2008–2009: Świt Nowy Dwór
- 2009–2011: Polonia Warsaw II
- 2011–2012: Wisła Płock
- 2012–2014: Racing Club Beirut
- 2015: Shabab Al Sahel
- 2015–2016: Dukla Prague B
- 2017–2018: Ansar Al Mawadda
- 2020–2023: SK Slovan Poděbrady

Libor Pala (born 22 July 1961) is a Czech professional football manager. As well as leading teams in his native Czech Republic, he has coached clubs in Poland and the Middle East. He started his coaching career at the age of 28.

Before heading into management, Pala played football, although he only reached the Czech 2. Liga. Pala was the manager of FC Karviná in the 2000–01 Czech 2. Liga. He led Polish side Nowy Dwór into the 2003–04 Ekstraklasa, before moving to manage Lech Poznań.

Pala joined Ústí nad Labem in 2007, but his side were quickly knocked out of the 2007–08 Czech Cup in their first game.
