= Spartak Brno =

Spartak Brno may refer to:

- Basket Brno, Czech basketball team formerly known as BC Spartak ZJŠ Brno (1945–76) and Spartak-Zbrojovka Brno (1976–77)
- FC Zbrojovka Brno, Czech football team formerly known as DSO Spartak Zbrojovka Brno (1953–56) and TJ Spartak ZJŠ Brno (1956–68)
- FC LeRK Brno, Czech football team formerly known as Spartak Královo Pole Brno (1953–61) and Spartak Brno KPS (1961–63)
