= Přemysl Bičovský =

Czech footballer and manager

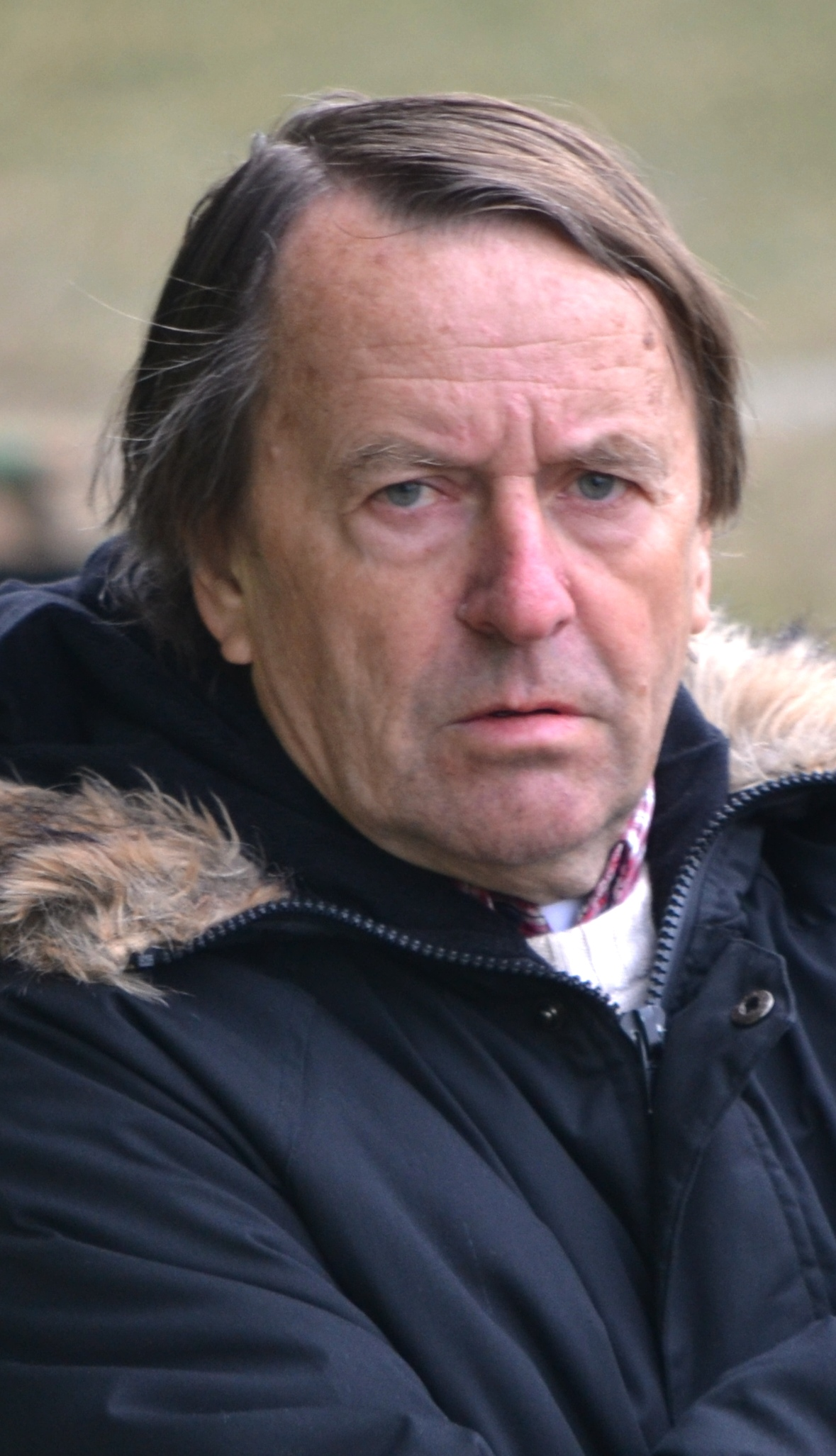

Personal information
- Date of birth: 18 August 1950 (age 76)
- Place of birth: Košťany, Czechoslovakia
- Height: 1.74 m (5 ft 9 in)
- Position: Striker

Senior career*
Years	Team	Apps	(Gls)
1967–1970	Sklo Union Teplice		
1970–1972	Dukla Prague		
1972–1976	Sklo Union Teplice		
1976–1983	Bohemians Prague		
1983–1986	SC Eisenstadt		
1986–1989	VfB Mödling		
1989–1993	ASK Ybbs		

International career
1970–1983	Czechoslovakia	45	(11)

Managerial career
- 1989–1993: ASK Ybbs
- 1993–1996: FK Teplice B
- 1996–1997: FK Teplice (Assistant)
- 1998: FC Chomutov
- 1998: Lokomotíva Česká Lípa
- 1999–2001: FC Chomutov
- 2001–2002: SK Buldoci Karlovy Vary-Dvory
- 2002–2003: SIAD Braňany
- 2003–2004: FK SIAD Most B
- 2004–2005: FK SIAD Most
- 2006–2007: Chmel Blšany
- 2007–2008: MFK Ružomberok
- 2008–2009: SK Roudnice nad Labem (youth)
- 2009: FC Zenit Čáslav
- 2012: FK Ústí nad Labem
Medal record
Representing Czechoslovakia
UEFA European Championship
Winner	1976 Yugoslavia
- * Club domestic league appearances and goals

Přemysl Bičovský (born 18 August 1950 in Košťany) is a Czech football manager and former player. He was most recently the manager of FK Ústí nad Labem in the Czech 2. Liga.

== Career ==
Throughout his career, he played 45 matches for Czechoslovakia as a forward between 1970 and 1983, scoring 11 goals. He was a participant in the 1982 FIFA World Cup.

He played for FK Teplice and later spent his best football years at Bohemians Praha.

Bičovský later began a coaching career with ASK Ybbs, FK Teplice, FC Chomutov, Lokomotíva Česká Lípa, SK Buldoci Karlovy Vary-Dvory, SIAD Braňany, FK SIAD Most, Chmel Blšany, MFK Ružomberok, SK Roudnice nad Labem and FC Zenit Čáslav.

== Career statistics ==
=== International ===
Appearances and goals by national team and year
National team	Year	Apps	Goals
Czechoslovakia	1970	1	0
Czechoslovakia	1971	1	0
Czechoslovakia	1972	1	0
Czechoslovakia	1973	6	1
Czechoslovakia	1974	10	4
Czechoslovakia	1975	10	4
Czechoslovakia	1976	–	
Czechoslovakia	1977	–	
Czechoslovakia	1978	–	
Czechoslovakia	1979	–	
Czechoslovakia	1980	1	0
Czechoslovakia	1981	7	0
Czechoslovakia	1982	4	1
Czechoslovakia	1983	4	1
Total		45	11

Scores and results list Czechoslovakia's goal tally first, score column indicates score after each Bičovský goal.

List of international goals scored by Přemysl Bičovsky
No.	Date	Venue	Opponent	Score	Result	Competition
1	2 June 1973	Stadion Letná, Prague, Czechoslovakia	Denmark	3–0	6–0	1974 FIFA World Cup qualification
2	27 April 1974	Stadion Letná, Prague, Czechoslovakia	France	2–2	3–3	Friendly
3	25 September 1974	Stadion Letná, Prague, Czechoslovakia	East Germany	1–0	3–1	Friendly
4	25 September 1974	Stadion Letná, Prague, Czechoslovakia	East Germany	2–1	3–1	Friendly
5	13 October 1974	Tehelné pole, Bratislava, Czechoslovakia	Sweden	4–0	4–0	Friendly
6	30 April 1975	Stadion Letná, Prague, Czechoslovakia	Portugal	1–0	5–0	UEFA Euro 1976 qualification
7	30 April 1975	Stadion Letná, Prague, Czechoslovakia	Portugal	2–0	5–0	UEFA Euro 1976 qualification
8	19 November 1975	Za Lužánkami Stadium, Brno, Czechoslovakia	East Germany	1–1	1–1	1976 Summer Olympics qualification
9	23 November 1975	Tsirio Stadium, Limassol, Cyprus	Cyprus	2–0	3–0	UEFA Euro 1976 qualification
10	14 April 1982	Müngersdorfer Stadium, Cologne, West Germany	West Germany	1–1	1–2	Friendly
11	27 March 1983	Makario Stadium, Nicosia, Cyprus	Cyprus	1–1	1–1	UEFA Euro 1984 qualification
