= Tomáš Kott =

Czech footballer

Personal information
- Date of birth: 15 November 1999 (age 26)
- Height: 1.68 m (5 ft 6 in)
- Position: Midfielder

Team information
- Current team: Ústí nad Labem
- Number: 22

Youth career
- Dukla Prague

Senior career*
Years	Team	Apps	(Gls)
2018–2022	Dukla Prague	12	(0)
2019–2022	→→ Dukla Prague B	16	(2)
2022–2025	Slovan Velvary	77	(15)
2024–2025	→ Ústí nad Labem (loan)	32	(2)
2025–	Ústí nad Labem	24	(1)
- * Club domestic league appearances and goals as of 28 May 2026

Tomáš Kott (born 15 November 1999) is a Czech professional football midfielder currently playing for Ústí nad Labem.

He made his league debut for Dukla Prague on 29 September 2018 in their 1–1 home draw against Zlín.

In 2022, Kott signed a contract with Slovan Velvary.

In 2024, Kott joined Ústí nad Labem on a loan deal.
