= Michal Zachariáš =

Czech footballer

Personal information
- Date of birth: 15 April 1984 (age 42)
- Place of birth: Czechoslovakia
- Height: 1.80 m (5 ft 11 in)
- Position: Forward

Team information
- Current team: SK Kladno
- Number: 12

Senior career*
Years	Team	Apps	(Gls)
2003–	Kladno	76	(9)
2006–2007	→ Čáslav (loan)		
- * Club domestic league appearances and goals as of 9 July 2011

Michal Zachariáš (born 15 April 1984) is a professional Czech football player who currently plays for SK Kladno. He was among the top goalscorers in the 2004–05 Czech 2. Liga. He played in three seasons of the Gambrinus liga, making 62 appearances and scoring four goals.
