= Frýdlant nad Ostravicí =

- Town
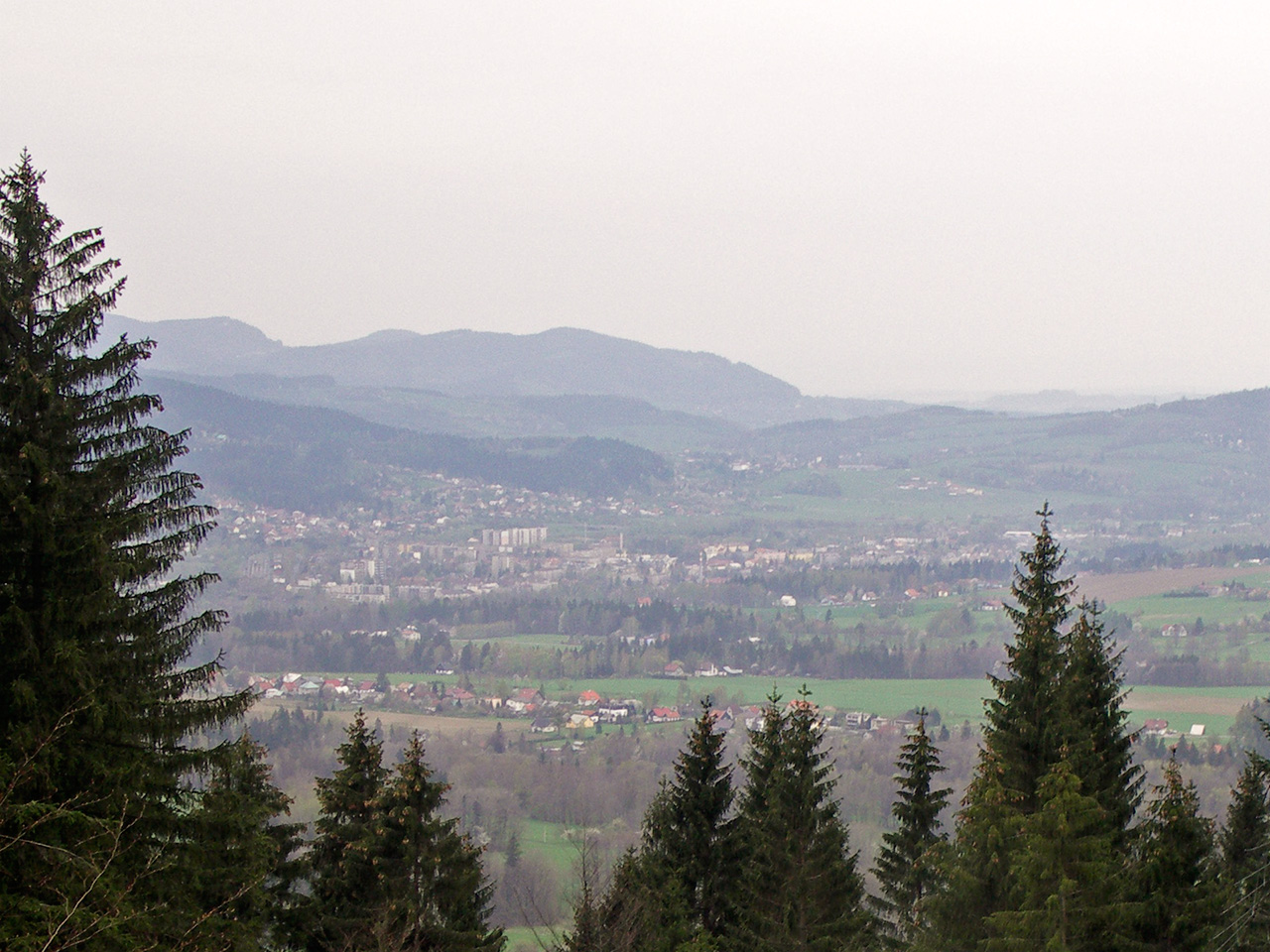
- The town as seen from the slope of Lysá hora

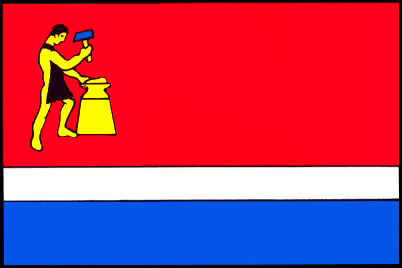
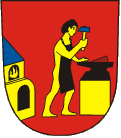
- Flag Coat of arms

- Location in the Czech Republic
- Coordinates: 49°35′34″N 18°21′35″E
- Country: Czech Republic
- Region: Moravian-Silesian
- District: Frýdek-Místek
- First mentioned: 1395

Government
  - Mayor: Helena Pešatová

Area
  - Total: 21.91 km^{2} (8.46 sq mi)
- Elevation: 357 m (1,171 ft)

Population (2026-01-01)
  - Total: 9,839
  - Density: 449.1/km^{2} (1,163/sq mi)
- Time zone: UTC+1 (CET)
  - Summer (DST): UTC+2 (CEST)
- Postal code: 739 11
- Website: www.frydlantno.cz

Frýdlant nad Ostravicí (Czech pronunciation: [ˈfriːdlant ˈnat ostravɪtsiː]; German: Friedland (an der Ostrawitza)) is a town in Frýdek-Místek District in the Moravian-Silesian Region of the Czech Republic. It has about 9,800 inhabitants. The town is located on the Ostravice River, on the border between the Moravian-Silesian Foothills and Moravian-Silesian Beskids.

Frýdlant nad Ostravicí was founded in the second half of the 14th century and became a town in 1948. The most important historical landmark is the Church of Saint Bartholomew from the 17th century.

== Administrative division ==
Frýdlant nad Ostravicí consists of three municipal parts (in brackets population according to the 2021 census):

- Frýdlant (7,846)
- Lubno (656)
- Nová Ves (1,287)

== Geography ==
Frýdlant nad Ostravicí is located about 8 kilometres (5 mi) south of Frýdek-Místek and 23 km (14 mi) south of Ostrava. It lies mostly in the Moravian-Silesian Foothills, only the southern part of the municipal territory extends into the Moravian-Silesian Beskids. The highest point is at 730 m (2,400 ft) above sea level.

The town lies on the Ostravice River, at its confluence with the Čeladenka Stream. The left bank of the Ostravice with the town proper lies in the historical land of Moravia, while the right bank with the villages of Lubno and Nová Ves lies in Czech Silesia.

== History ==
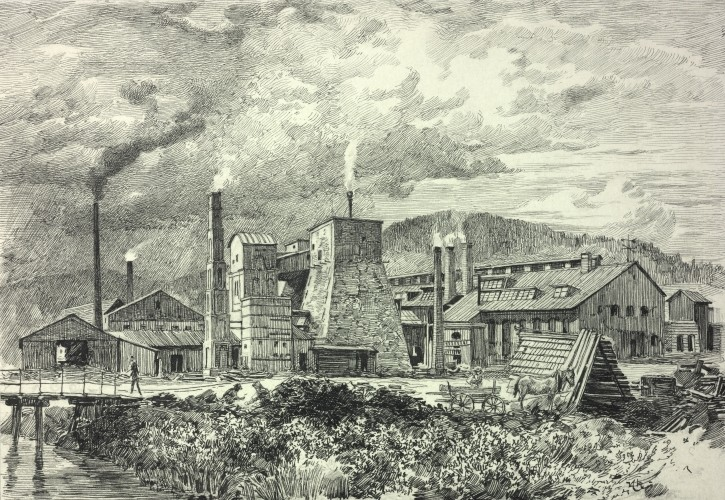
Frýdlant Archbishop's Ironworks

The first written mention of Frýdlant is from 1395. The town was founded in the second half of the 14th century during German Ostsiedlung. It was established as a market town that was supposed to be the local centre of trade and handicrafts. In 1402, Frýdlant was sold by the Lords of Kravaře to Duke Przemyslaus I Noszak and joined to Duchy of Teschen. Frýdlant found itself on the periphery, lost its position and became a mere village. The economy was also hit by the Hussite Wars.

In the 16th century, Frýdlant was sold to the Olomouc bishopric and became part of the Hukvaldy estate. It was the impetus for the re-development of crafts. In 1625, the village received various privileges from the bishop Franz von Dietrichstein. During the Thirty Years' War, Frýdlant suffered from frequent army crossings.

Between 1646 and 1648, the first hammer mills were built and Frýdland gradually became a centre of ironworks. The village later known as Nová Ves was founded near the hammer mills in 1647. In 1675, blast furnaces were built. Thanks to the development of the ironworks and the prosperous paper mill, the village was promoted by Maria Theresa to the market town again in 1775.

The railway was built in 1871. Large fires in 1886 and 1890 damaged the market town severely. In 1948, Frýdland was promoted to a town.

== Demographics ==
Historical population

Year	Pop.	±%
1869	3,758	—
1880	4,062	+8.1%
1890	4,091	+0.7%
1900	4,051	−1.0%
1910	4,590	+13.3%

Year	Pop.	±%
1921	4,668	+1.7%
1930	5,558	+19.1%
1950	5,677	+2.1%
1961	6,702	+18.1%
1970	8,013	+19.6%

Year	Pop.	±%
1980	9,229	+15.2%
1991	9,718	+5.3%
2001	9,791	+0.8%
2011	9,667	−1.3%
2021	9,789	+1.3%

Source: Censuses

== Transport ==
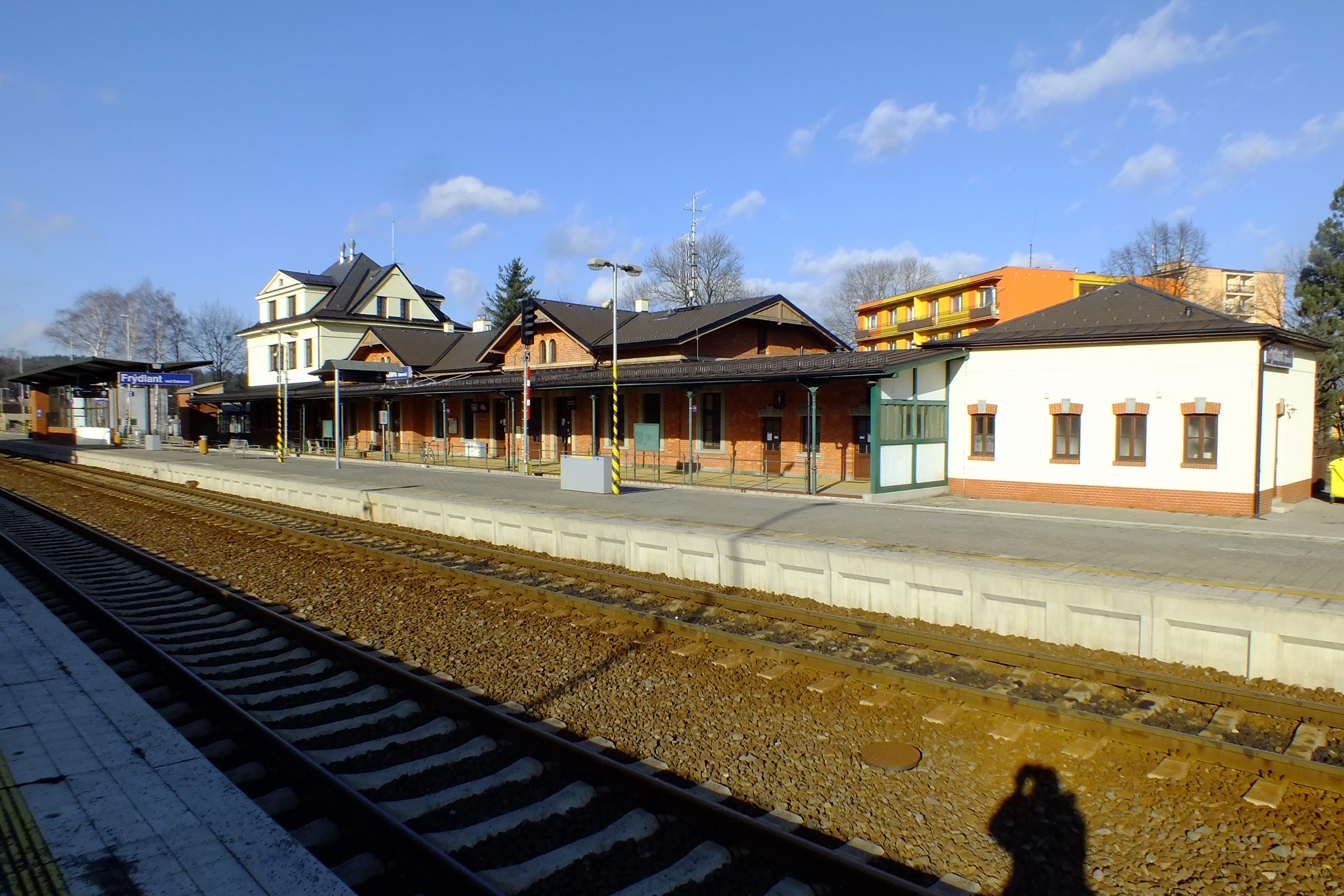
Train station

Frýdlant nad Ostravicí is located on the railway lines Ostrava–Frýdlant nad Ostravicí and Frýdek-Místek–Ostravice.

== Education ==
Two gymnasiums are located in Frýdlant nad Ostravicí: the public Frýdlant nad Ostravicí Gymnasium and the private Beskydy Mountain Academy. There is also a separate workplace of the Frýdek-Místek Secondary School of Crafts.

== Sights ==
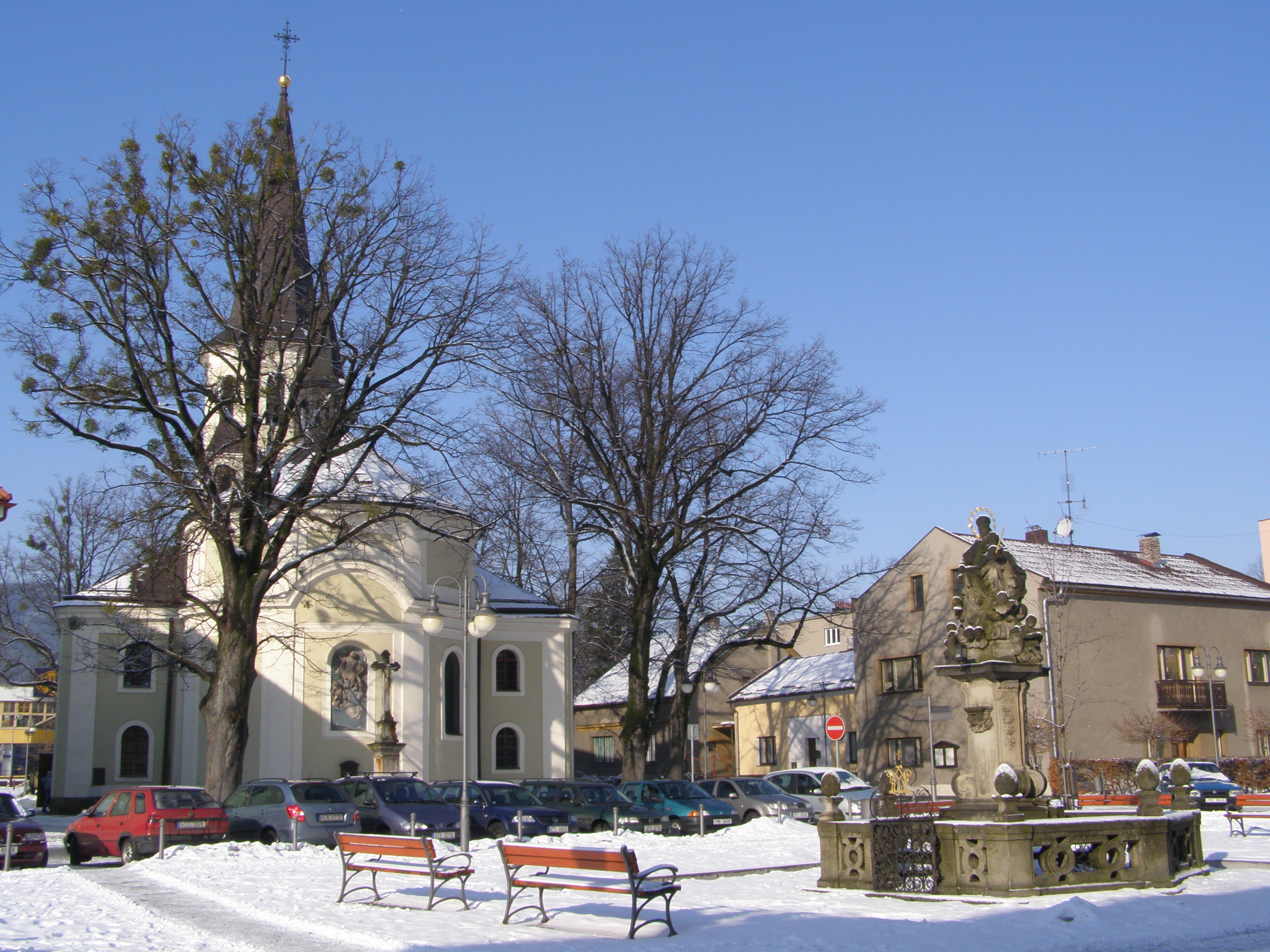
Town square with the Church of Saint Bartholomew and the Marian column

The main landmark of the town is the Church of Saint Bartholomew, built in 1672–1690. Other monuments at the town square are the neo-Renaissance town hall from 1894 and a Baroque Marian column with a rare statue of the Virgin Mary of Carmel from 1731.

The monastery of the Sisters of Mercy of St. Charles Borromeo with a neo-Romanesque chapel dates from the second half of the 19th century. Today it is used as a retirement home. There are also several original wooden houses that are reminiscent of the original appearance of the town.

== Notable people ==
- Dominik Trčka (1886–1959), Catholic priest and martyr
- Ferdiš Duša (1888–1958), artist
- Petr Faldyna (born 1976), footballer

== Twin towns – sister cities ==
Frýdlant nad Ostravicí is twinned with:

- Debrzno, Poland
- Dravograd, Slovenia
- Friedland, Mecklenburg-Vorpommern, Germany
- Friedland, Lower Saxony, Germany
- Friedland, Brandenburg, Germany
- Frýdlant, Czech Republic
- Korfantów, Poland
- Mieroszów, Poland
- Mirosławiec, Poland
- Pravdinsk, Russia
- Radeburg, Germany
- Turzovka, Slovakia
