= 1994–95 Czech 2. Liga =

2. česká fotbalová liga
- Season: 1994–1995
- Champions: U. Hradiště
- Promoted: U. Hradiště; Opava
- Relegated: Uherský Brod; Kladno; Xaverov; Brandýs nad Labem
- Matches: 306
- Goals: 872 (2.85 per match)
- Top goalscorer: Bedřich Hamsa (22)
- Average attendance: 1,636

The 1994–95 Czech 2. Liga was the second season of the 2. česká fotbalová liga, the second tier of the Czech football league. The league was played with 18 teams, although the following season the number was reduced to 16 teams, so four relegation places were available.

== League standings ==
Pos	Team	Pld	W	D	L	GF	GA	GD	Pts	Promotion or relegation
1	Uherské Hradiště (C, P)	34	23	6	5	83	31	+52	75	Promotion to 1995–96 1. Liga
2	Opava (P)	34	22	4	8	66	26	+40	70	Promotion to 1995–96 1. Liga
3	LeRK Brno	34	21	3	10	84	46	+38	66	
4	Teplice	34	16	4	14	55	47	+8	52	
5	Příbram	34	13	11	10	45	39	+6	50	
6	Karviná	34	14	7	13	51	41	+10	49	
7	Frýdek-Místek	34	13	10	11	40	36	+4	49	
8	Ústí nad Labem	34	13	10	11	58	60	−2	49	
9	Turnov	34	14	7	13	33	45	−12	49	
10	Blšany	34	13	9	12	49	45	+4	48	
11	Havířov	34	13	7	14	46	44	+2	46	
12	Třinec	34	13	7	14	43	45	−2	46	
13	Bohumín	34	14	4	16	46	52	−6	46	
14	Pardubice	34	12	6	16	41	56	−15	42	
15	Uherský Brod (R)	34	12	5	17	29	46	−17	41	Relegation to 1995–96 MSFL
16	Kladno (R)	34	8	11	15	36	51	−15	35	Relegation to 1995–96 ČFL
17	Xaverov (R)	34	7	9	18	37	74	−37	30	Relegation to 1995–96 ČFL
18	Brandýs (R)	34	3	4	27	30	88	−58	13	Relegation to 1995–96 Divize C

Source: RSSSF
Rules for classification: 1) points; 2) goal difference; 3) number of goals scored.
(C) Champions; (P) Promoted; (R) Relegated

== Top goalscorers ==
Rank	Scorer	Club	Goals
1	(Czech Republic) Bedřich Hamsa	LeRK Brno	22
2	(Czech Republic) Petr Podaný	U. Hradiště	19
2	(Czech Republic) Martin Procházka	Ústí nad Labem	19
2	(Czech Republic) Martin Rozhon	Opava	19
5	(Czech Republic) Pavel Verbíř	Teplice	17

== See also ==
- 1994–95 Czech First League
- 1994–95 Czech Cup
