= 1974 FIFA World Cup qualification – UEFA Group 8 =

Group 8 consisted of three of the 32 teams entered into the European zone: Czechoslovakia, Denmark, and Scotland. These three teams competed on a home-and-away basis for one of the 9.5 spots in the final tournament allocated to the European zone, with the group's winner claiming the place in the finals.

== Standings ==
Rank	Team	Pld	W	D	L	GF	GA	GD	Pts
1	Scotland	4	3	0	1	8	3	+5	6
2	Czechoslovakia	4	2	1	1	9	3	+6	5
3	Denmark	4	0	1	3	2	13	−11	1

== Matches ==
18 October 1972

Denmark	1–4	Scotland
Laudrup 28'	Report	Macari 18'; Bone 20'; Harper 80'; Morgan 83'

Københavns Idrætspark, Copenhagen, Denmark
Attendance: 31,200
Referee: Bakhramov (Soviet Union)

15 November 1972

Scotland	2–0	Denmark
Dalglish 2'; Lorimer 46'	Report

Hampden Park, Glasgow, Scotland
Attendance: 47,109
Referee: Corver (Netherlands)

2 May 1973

Denmark	1–1	Czechoslovakia
Bjørnmose 15'	Report	Petráš 32'

Københavns Idrætspark, Copenhagen, Denmark
Attendance: 19,942
Referee: Lo Bello (Italy)

2 June 1973

Czechoslovakia	6–0	Denmark
Nehoda 46'; Veselý 56', 65', 80'; Bičovský 57'; Hagara 60'	Report

Stadion Letná, Prague, Czechoslovakia
Attendance: 17,432
Referee: Anton Bucheli (Switzerland)

26 September 1973

Scotland	2–1	Czechoslovakia
Holton 40'; Jordan 74'	Report	Nehoda 32'

Hampden Park, Glasgow, Scotland
Attendance: 95,786
Referee: Øberg (Norway)

17 October 1973

Czechoslovakia	1–0	Scotland
Nehoda 15' (pen.)	Report

Tehelné pole, Bratislava, Czechoslovakia
Attendance: 13,668
Referee: Biwersi (West Germany)
