= Jiří Skála =

Czech footballer

Personal information
- Date of birth: 10 October 1973 (age 53)
- Place of birth: Czechoslovakia
- Height: 1.81 m (5 ft 11 in)
- Position: Midfielder

Senior career*
Years	Team	Apps	(Gls)
1993–1998	FC Viktoria Plzeň		
1998–2001	SK Slavia Prague		
2001–2004	FK Teplice	53	(2)
2004–2005	FK Mladá Boleslav	24	(0)
2005–2007	SK Dynamo České Budějovice		

International career
1993–1996	Czech Republic U21	14	(0)

Managerial career
- 2016–2017: FK Ústí nad Labem
- * Club domestic league appearances and goals

Jiří Skála (born 10 October 1973) is a Czech football midfielder. He made over 200 appearances in the Gambrinus liga. Skála played international football at under-21 level for Czech Republic U21. He scored for Slavia Prague in the 1998–99 UEFA Cup in the 4–0 second qualifying round victory against FK Inter Bratislava.

== Honours ==
=== Club ===
Slavia Prague

- Czech Cup: 1998–99
