= Tomáš Kaplan =

Czech footballer

Personal information
- Date of birth: 3 April 1978 (age 48)
- Place of birth: Jihlava, Czechoslovakia
- Height: 1.84 m (6 ft 0 in)
- Position: Forward

Youth career
- Slavoj Polná

Senior career*
Years	Team	Apps	(Gls)
1998–2006	Vysočina Jihlava	145	(35)
2006	Příbram	8	(1)
2007–2008	Tatran Prešov	6	(1)
2008–2009	Vysočina Jihlava	17	(1)
- * Club domestic league appearances and goals

Tomáš Kaplan (born 3 April 1978) is a Czech former professional footballer. He made 36 appearances in the Czech First League, playing for Vysočina Jihlava and Příbram.

Kaplan finished as joint-top scorer in the 2003–04 Czech 2. Liga, scoring 10 goals.
