= FK Viagem Ústí nad Labem =

Czech association football club

- Full name: FK VIAGEM Ústí nad Labem a.s.
- Nickname: Arma
- Founded: 1945; 81 years ago
- Ground: Městský stadion
- Capacity: 4,000
- Chairman: Přemysl Kubáň
- Manager: David Oulehla
- League: Czech National Football League
- 2025–26: 4th of 16
- Website: www.fkviagemusti.cz
| Home colours | Away colours |

FK Viagem Ústí nad Labem is a Czech football club based in the city of Ústí nad Labem. From the 2025–26 season, the club plays Czech National Football League.

The club has played at the top level of national football on three occasions, most recently in the 2010–11 season. However their joy was short-lived as they were immediately relegated.

== History ==
Club crest (2023–2026)

Club crest used until 2023

The club was established in 1945 under the name SK Ústí nad Labem. It played in the Czechoslovak First League in 1952 and 1958–59 seasons. Ústí nad Labem played in the second league in the 1990s until withdrawing from the 1997–98 Czech 2. Liga, whereby their results were annulled and the team was automatically relegated. After having spent over 50 years outside the top flight, the club was promoted to the Czech First League in 2010. Ústí nad Labem only remained in the Czech First League for a single season as they were relegated immediately, returning to the Czech 2. Liga in 2011. Despite winning the 2. Liga in the 2011–12 season, the club were denied promotion by the league, due to their stadium not meeting its criteria.

With a new owner, the club changed its name to FK VIAGEM Ústí nad Labem in July 2023.

=== Historical names ===
- 1945 – SK Ústí nad Labem
- 1947 – SK Slavia Ústí nad Labem
- 1949 – Sokol Armaturka Ústí nad Labem
- 1950 – ZSJ Armaturka Ústí nad Labem
- 1953 – DSO Spartak Ústí nad Labem
- 1962 – TJ Spartak Ústí nad Labem
- 1977 – TJ Spartak Armaturka Ústí nad Labem
- 1983 – TJ Spartak PS Ústí nad Labem
- 1984 – TJ Spartak VHJ PS Ústí nad Labem
- 1991 – FK Armaturka Ústí nad Labem
- 1994 – FK GGS Arma Ústí nad Labem
- 1999 – Merged with FK NRC Všebořice
- 2001 – MFK Ústí nad Labem
- 2006 – FK Ústí nad Labem
- 2023 – FK VIAGEM Ústí nad Labem

== Stadium ==
Ústí nad Labem's home stadium is Městský stadion. However, the stadium has a seated capacity of just 555, and as such does not meet the league requirements for the Czech First League. Therefore, during the 2010–11 season, the team played its home matches at Na Stínadlech in Teplice. When the club won the 2011–12 Czech 2. Liga, the team were not promoted to the Czech First League due to the issues with the stadium.

== Honours ==
- Czech 2. Liga (second tier)
  - Champions (1): 2011–12
  - Runners-Up (1): 2009–10
- Bohemian Football League (third tier)
  - Champions (3): 1993–94, 2003–04, 2024–25
- Czech Fourth Division (fourth tier)
  - Champions 2002–03

== Players ==
=== Current squad ===
As of 30 August 2026

Note: Flags indicate national team as defined under FIFA eligibility rules; some limited exceptions apply. Players may hold more than one non-FIFA nationality.

| No. | Pos. | Nation | Player |
|---|---|---|---|
| 1 | GK | CZE | David Němec |
| 2 | GK | SRB | Luka Savić |
| 3 | DF | CZE | David Březina |
| 6 | MF | NGR | Solomon Osaghae |
| 7 | MF | CZE | Daniel Richter |
| 8 | MF | CZE | Jan Peterka |
| 9 | FW | GAB | Alan Do Marcolino |
| 10 | FW | CZE | David Černý |
| 12 | DF | BFA | Bachirou Yaméogo |
| 14 | FW | CZE | Pavel Moulis |
| 15 | DF | CZE | Ondřej Ullman |
| 16 | MF | CZE | Ladislav Kodad |

| No. | Pos. | Nation | Player |
|---|---|---|---|
| 17 | MF | GEO | Tsotne Berelidze |
| 18 | FW | BFA | Yacouba Diarra |
| 19 | MF | CZE | Patrik Goj |
| 21 | MF | CZE | Jonáš Bzura |
| 22 | MF | CZE | Tomáš Kott |
| 23 | FW | BEL | Franck Idumbo-Muzambo |
| 27 | DF | CZE | Nicolas Piralič |
| 28 | FW | NED | Jevon Simons |
| 42 | DF | CZE | Vítek Kuta |
| 77 | MF | CZE | Antonín Fantiš |
| 91 | GK | CZE | Tomáš Holý |

=== Out on loan ===
Note: Flags indicate national team as defined under FIFA eligibility rules; some limited exceptions apply. Players may hold more than one non-FIFA nationality.

| No. | Pos. | Nation | Player |

== Managers ==
- 1993 František Plass
- 2002 Václav Rys
- 2004 Michal Zach
- 2005 Jiří Plíšek
- 2006 Václav Rys
- 2007 Libor Pala
- 2007 Svatopluk Habanec
- 2012 Přemysl Bičovský
- 2013 Lukáš Přerost
- 2014 Petr Němec
- 2016 Jiří Skála
- 2017 Aleš Křeček
- 2020 Juraj Šimurka (caretaker)
- 2020 Jiří Jarošík
- 2021 David Jarolím
- 2022 Martin Hašek
- 2022 Dušan Tesařík
- 2023 Branislav Sokoli
- 2024 Svatopluk Habanec
- 2026 David Oulehla

== History in domestic competitions ==
- 1994–1998 Czech 2. Liga
- 1998–1999 (did not compete in any competition)
- 1999–2000 Regional Championship
- 2000–2003 Czech Fourth Division
- 2003–2004 Bohemian Football League
- 2004–2010 Czech 2. Liga
- 2010–2011 Czech First League
- 2011–2022 Czech National Football League
- 2022–2025 Bohemian Football League
- 2025– Czech National Football League

- Seasons spent at Level 1 of the football league system: 1
- Seasons spent at Level 2 of the football league system: 21
- Seasons spent at Level 3 of the football league system: 4
- Seasons spent at Level 4 of the football league system: 3
- Seasons spent at Level 5 of the football league system: 1

=== Czech Republic ===
| Season | League | Placed | Pld | W | D | L | GF | GA | GD | Pts | Cup |
|---|---|---|---|---|---|---|---|---|---|---|---|
| 1994–95 | 2. liga | 8th | 34 | 13 | 10 | 11 | 58 | 60 | –2 | 49 | Round of 32 |
| 1995–96 | 2. liga | 13th | 30 | 7 | 12 | 11 | 39 | 43 | –4 | 33 | Round of 64 |
| 1996–97 | 2. liga | 9th | 30 | 9 | 11 | 10 | 24 | 30 | –6 | 38 | Round of 32 |
| 1997–98 | 2. liga | 16th | 0 | 0 | 0 | 0 | 0 | 0 | 0 | 0 | Round of 64 |
| 1998–99 | | | | | | | | | | | |
| 1999–00 | 5. liga | 4th | 30 | 13 | 9 | 8 | 54 | 41 | +13 | 48 | – |
| 2000–01 | 4. liga | 10th | 30 | 10 | 8 | 12 | 41 | 42 | –1 | 38 | – |
| 2001–02 | 4. liga | 12th | 30 | 8 | 11 | 11 | 35 | 49 | -14 | 35 | Round of 64 |
| 2002–03 | 4. liga | 1st | 30 | 21 | 3 | 6 | 84 | 31 | +53 | 66 | First round |
| 2003–04 | 3. liga | 1st | 34 | 21 | 7 | 6 | 62 | 22 | +40 | 70 | Round of 32 |
| 2004–05 | 2. liga | 12th | 28 | 7 | 9 | 12 | 27 | 40 | –13 | 30 | |
| 2005–06 | 2. liga | 3rd | 30 | 14 | 7 | 9 | 47 | 39 | +8 | 49 | Round of 16 |
| 2006–07 | 2. liga | 9th | 30 | 10 | 7 | 13 | 41 | 44 | –3 | 37 | Round of 64 |
| 2007–08 | 2. liga | 12th | 30 | 9 | 7 | 14 | 35 | 44 | –9 | 34 | First round |
| 2008–09 | 2. liga | 4th | 30 | 15 | 4 | 11 | 39 | 38 | +1 | 49 | Round of 32 |
| 2009–10 | 2. liga | 2nd | 30 | 20 | 5 | 5 | 52 | 27 | +25 | 65 | Round of 64 |
| 2010–11 | 1. liga | 16th | 30 | 4 | 7 | 19 | 22 | 67 | –45 | 19 | Round of 32 |
| 2011–12 | 2. liga | 1st | 30 | 19 | 4 | 7 | 52 | 35 | +17 | 61 | Round of 64 |
| 2012–13 | 2. liga | 10th | 30 | 11 | 6 | 13 | 32 | 42 | –10 | 39 | Round of 16 |
| 2013–14 | 2. liga | 7th | 30 | 13 | 4 | 13 | 38 | 37 | +1 | 43 | Round of 16 |
| 2014–15 | 2. liga | 12th | 30 | 10 | 4 | 16 | 34 | 46 | –12 | 34 | Round of 32 |
| 2015–16 | 2. liga | 7th | 28 | 8 | 11 | 9 | 39 | 38 | +1 | 35 | Round of 16 |
| 2016–17 | 2. liga | 8th | 30 | 10 | 7 | 13 | 34 | 41 | –7 | 37 | Round of 32 |
| 2017–18 | 2. liga | 10th | 30 | 10 | 6 | 14 | 37 | 47 | –10 | 36 | Round of 32 |
| 2018–19 | 2. liga | 5th | 30 | 15 | 4 | 11 | 44 | 39 | +5 | 49 | Round of 32 |
| 2019–20 | 2. liga | 7th | 30 | 11 | 8 | 11 | 46 | 47 | –1 | 41 | Round of 64 |
| 2020–21 | 2. liga | 5th | 26 | 12 | 5 | 9 | 24 | 29 | –5 | 41 | Round of 64 |
| 2021–22 | 2. liga | 15th | 30 | 6 | 10 | 14 | 26 | 49 | –23 | 28 | Round of 64 |
| 2022–23 | 3. liga | 13th | 30 | 8 | 8 | 14 | 45 | 68 | –23 | 32 | Round of 64 |
| 2023–24 | 3. liga | 3rd | 30 | 16 | 5 | 9 | 51 | 36 | +15 | 53 | Round of 64 |
| 2024–25 | 3. liga | 1st | 32 | 26 | 4 | 2 | 89 | 18 | +71 | 82 | Round of 32 |
| 2025–26 | 2. liga | 4th | 30 | 15 | 3 | 12 | 53 | 46 | +7 | 48 | Round of 32 |
| 2026–27 | 2. liga | | | | | | | | | | Round of 64 |
