= Czech National Football League =

Chance Národní Liga
- Organising body: Czech Football League Association
- Founded: 1993
- Country: Czech Republic
- Confederation: UEFA
- Number of clubs: 16
- Level on pyramid: 2
- Promotion to: Czech First League
- Relegation to: ČFL; MSFL
- Domestic cup: Czech Cup
- Current champions: FC Zbrojovka Brno (2nd title) (2025–26)
- Most championships: MFK Karviná, SK Dynamo České Budějovice, FC Hradec Králové (3 titles)
- Website: www.chnliga.cz
- Current: 2026–27 Czech National Football League

The Czech National Football League (Czech: Fotbalová národní liga, CHNL), known as Chance Národní Liga due to sponsorship reasons, is the second level professional association football league in the Czech Republic. Before 2013 it was known as 2. liga or Druhá liga. The top team each season is eligible for promotion to the Czech First League, while the second and third placed teams enter play offs for possible promotion.

The league replaced the I.ČNL (I. Česká národní liga; First Czech National League), which had been established following the end of the nationwide Czechoslovak Second League in 1977. The league became known as simply II. liga (Second League) in 1993 following the establishment of the Czech Republic as an independent state.

== Structure ==
There are 16 clubs in the CHNL. During the season, which runs from August to May or June, with a winter break between November and February or March, each club plays each of the other clubs twice (once at home, once away) and is awarded three points for a win, one for a draw and zero for a loss. Teams are ranked by total points, then goal difference and then goals scored. At the end of each season, the top-ranked team is promoted to the Czech First League, providing they obtain a license and meet league requirements, and is replaced by the team that finished 16th in that league. The two teams positioned 2nd and 3rd play a play-out with two teams from the first league positioned 14th and 15th in a home and away format. The two teams that finished at the bottom of the CHNL are relegated to either the Bohemian Football League or the Moravian-Silesian Football League, based on geographical criteria. In turn, the champions of each of these regional divisions are promoted to the CHNL.

Fortuna Národní Liga (2016–2024)

In the 1993–94 season the league was played with 16 teams, before expanding to 18 teams in the 1994–95 season. Since 1995, the league is usually played with 16 teams, but on two occasions a team did not fulfil its fixtures and the full 30 rounds were not completed. Firstly in the 1997–98 Czech 2. Liga as Ústí nad Labem did not fulfil their fixtures and their results were cancelled, and secondly in the 2004–05 Czech 2. Liga as Bohemians' results were expunged after playing only the first half of the season. In the 2020–21 season, only 14 teams competed because of the suspension of the first league in the previous season due to the COVID-19 pandemic.

== Participating teams ==
The following 16 clubs are competing in the 2025–26 Czech National Football League.

Club	Location	Stadium	Capacity	2024–25 position
SK Dynamo České Budějovice	České Budějovice	Stadion Střelecký ostrov	6,681	16th in First League
MFK Chrudim	Chrudim	Za Vodojemem	1,500	2nd
FC Silon Táborsko	Tábor	Stadion v Kvapilově ulici	1,500	4th
AC Sparta Prague B	Prague	eFotbal Arena	2,799	5th
FC Sellier & Bellot Vlašim	Vlašim	Stadion Kollárova ulice	3,000	6th
FC Zbrojovka Brno	Brno	Městský fotbalový stadion Srbská	10,200	7th
SK Artis Brno	Brno	Městský fotbalový stadion Srbská	10,200	8th
FK Viktoria Žižkov	Prague	eFotbal Arena	2,799	9th
FC Vysočina Jihlava	Jihlava	Stadion v Jiráskově ulici	4,500	10th
SK Slavia Prague B	Prague	Stadion Olympia Radotín	1,500	11th
1. SK Prostějov	Prostějov	Stadion Za Místním nádražím	3,500	12th
SFC Opava	Opava	Stadion v Městských sadech	7,524	13th
FC Baník Ostrava B	Ostrava	Městský stadion (Ostrava)	15,123	14th
FK Viagem Ústí nad Labem	Ústí nad Labem	Městský stadion	4,000	1st in ČFL
SK Hanácká Slavia Kroměříž	Kroměříž	Stadion Jožky Silného	1,529	1st in MSFL
FK Příbram	Příbram	Na Litavce	9,100	2nd in ČFL Group A

== CHNL champions ==
Season	Winners	Runners-up
1993–94	Sklobižu Jablonec nad Nisou	FK Švarc Benešov
1994–95	Uherské Hradiště	Ostroj Opava
1995–96	FC Karviná	FK Teplice
1996–97	FC Dukla Prague	AFK Atlantic Lázně Bohdaneč
1997–98	FK Chmel Blšany	FC Karviná
1998–99	Bohemians Prague	SK České Budějovice
1999–2000	Synot Staré Město	FC Viktoria Plzeň
2000–01	FC Hradec Králové	SFC Opava
2001–02	SK Dynamo České Budějovice	FK Zlín
2002–03	FC Viktoria Plzeň	SFC Opava
2003–04	FK Mladá Boleslav	FK Drnovice
2004–05	FK SIAD Most	FC Vysočina Jihlava
2005–06	SK Kladno	SK Dynamo České Budějovice
2006–07	FK Viktoria Žižkov	Bohemians 1905
2007–08	Bohemians Prague	FK Marila Příbram
2008–09	Bohemians 1905	FC Zenit Čáslav
2009–10	FC Hradec Králové	FK Ústí nad Labem
2010–11	FK Dukla Prague	FK Viktoria Žižkov
2011–12	FK Ústí nad Labem	FC Vysočina Jihlava
2012–13	1. SC Znojmo	Bohemians 1905
2013–14	SK Dynamo České Budějovice	FC Hradec Králové
2014–15	SK Sigma Olomouc	FK Varnsdorf
2015–16	MFK Karviná	FC Hradec Králové
2016–17	SK Sigma Olomouc	FC Baník Ostrava
2017–18	SFC Opava	1.FK Příbram
2018–19	SK Dynamo České Budějovice	FC Vysočina Jihlava
2019–20	FK Pardubice	FC Zbrojovka Brno
2020–21	FC Hradec Králové	SK Líšeň
2021–22	FC Zbrojovka Brno	FC Sellier & Bellot Vlašim
2022–23	MFK Karviná	MFK Vyškov
2023–24	FK Dukla Prague	SK Sigma Olomouc B
2024–25	FC Zlín	MFK Chrudim
2025–26	FC Zbrojovka Brno	FC Silon Táborsko

== Teams promoted to the First League since 1993 ==
From 1993 to 2018, the top two teams qualified for promotion. Since the 2018–19 season, only the top team has been directly promoted. Teams finishing second and third play a two-legged playoff with teams from the First League to determine who will play there next season. In the COVID-impacted 2019–20 season, the playoffs were cancelled.

- 1993: Viktoria Žižkov, Petra Drnovice, Viktoria Plzeň, Union Cheb, Slovan Liberec, Svit Zlín (Note: Due to dissolution of Czechoslovakia)
- 1994: Sklobižu Jablonec nad Nisou, Švarc Benešov
- 1995: Uherské Hradiště, Ostroj Opava
- 1996: FC Karviná, FK Teplice, Bohemians Prague (Note: Union Cheb was relegated due to bankruptcy)
- 1997: FC Dukla Příbram, AFK Atlantic Lázně Bohdaneč
- 1998: FK Chmel Blšany, FC Karviná
- 1999: Bohemians Prague, SK České Budějovice
- 2000: Synot Staré Město, FC Viktoria Plzeň
- 2001: FC Hradec Králové, SFC Opava
- 2002: SK Dynamo České Budějovice, FC Tescoma Zlín
- 2003: FC Viktoria Plzeň, SFC Opava
- 2004: FK Mladá Boleslav, FK Drnovice
- 2005: FK SIAD Most, FC Vysočina Jihlava, FC Viktoria Plzeň (Note: Drnovice were refused a Czech First League license so Plzeň were promoted to replace them)
- 2006: SK Kladno, SK Dynamo České Budějovice
- 2007: Viktoria Žižkov, Bohemians 1905
- 2008: Bohemians (Střížkov) Prague, FK Marila Příbram
- 2009: Bohemians 1905, 1. FC Slovácko (Note: Čáslav was not able to play 1st liga due to financial problems.)
- 2010: FC Hradec Králové, FK Ústí nad Labem
- 2011: FK Dukla Prague, FK Viktoria Žižkov
- 2012: FC Vysočina Jihlava, FC Zbrojovka Brno (Note: Ústí nad Labem was not able to play 1st liga due to problems with their stadium)
- 2013: 1. SC Znojmo, Bohemians 1905
- 2014: SK Dynamo České Budějovice, FC Hradec Králové
- 2015: SK Sigma Olomouc, FC Fastav Zlín
- 2016: MFK Karviná, FC Hradec Králové
- 2017: SK Sigma Olomouc, FC Baník Ostrava
- 2018: SFC Opava, 1.FK Příbram
- 2019: SK Dynamo České Budějovice
- 2020: FK Pardubice, FC Zbrojovka Brno
- 2021: FC Hradec Králové
- 2022: FC Zbrojovka Brno
- 2023: MFK Karviná
- 2024: FK Dukla Prague
- 2025: FC Zlín
- 2026: FC Zbrojovka Brno

== Top scorers ==
All information in this table can be found at except for the 2003–04 season, which is sourced from the following link.

Season	Top scorer	Club	Goals
1993–94	(Czech Republic) Tibor Mičinec	Benešov	18
1994–95	(Czech Republic) Bedřich Hamsa	LeRK Brno	22
1995–96	(Czech Republic) Patrik Holomek	Tatran Poštorná	16
1996–97	(Czech Republic) Václav Koloušek	Dukla Prague	18
1997–98	(Czech Republic) Vítězslav Tuma	Karviná	19
1998–99	(Czech Republic) Patrik Holomek	Staré Město	18
1999–00	(Czech Republic) Vladimír Malár	Staré Město	24
2000–01	(Czech Republic) Pavel Černý	Hradec Králové	17
2001–02	(Czech Republic) Radek Drulák	HFK Olomouc	16
2002–03	(Czech Republic) Petr Švancara	Opava	20
2003–04	(Czech Republic) Tomáš Kaplan	Vysočina Jihlava	10
2003–04	(Czech Republic) Roman Bednář	Mladá Boleslav	10
2003–04	(Czech Republic) Vojtěch Schulmeister	Sigma Olomouc B	10
2004–05	(Czech Republic) Horst Siegl	Baník Most	16
2005–06	(Czech Republic) Petr Faldyna	České Budějovice	19
2006–07	(Czech Republic) Petr Faldyna	Vysočina Jihlava	15
2007–08	(Czech Republic) Petr Faldyna	Vysočina Jihlava	13
2008–09	(Czech Republic) Martin Jirouš	Baník Sokolov	18
2009–10	(Czech Republic) Pavel Černý	Hradec Králové	14
2009–10	(Cameroon) Dani Chigou	Dukla Prague	14
2009–10	(Czech Republic) Karel Kroupa	Zlín	14
2010–11	(Cameroon) Dani Chigou	Dukla Prague	19
2011–12	(Czech Republic) Jiří Mlika	Baník Sokolov	19
2012–13	(Czech Republic) Lukáš Železník	Zlín	13
2013–14	(Czech Republic) David Vaněček	Hradec Králové	17
2014–15	(Czech Republic) Václav Vašíček	Sigma Olomouc	13
2015–16	(Czech Republic) Jan Pázler	Hradec Králové	17
2016–17	(Czech Republic) Jakub Plšek	Sigma Olomouc	18
2017–18	(Czech Republic) Jan Pázler	Hradec Králové	21
2018–19	(Czech Republic) David Ledecký	České Budějovice	18
2019–20	(Czech Republic) Stanislav Klobása	Jihlava	17
2020–21	(Czech Republic) Jaroslav Málek	Líšeň	13
2021–22	(Czech Republic) Jakub Řezníček	Zbrojovka Brno	18
2022–23	(Czech Republic) Tomáš Wágner	Viagem Příbram	17
2023–24	(Czech Republic) Jakub Řezníček	Zbrojovka Brno	13
2024–25	(Czech Republic) Tomáš Necid	Viktoria Žižkov	17
2025–26	(Nigeria) Quadri Adediran	Artis Brno	17
