= Ferdiš Duša =

Czech folk painter, artist and illustrator

Ferdiš Duša (13 January 1888 in Frýdlant nad Ostravicí – 1958 ibidem) was a Czech folk painter, graphic artist, illustrator and manufacturer of ceramics, coming from the borderland between Moravia and Silesia.

== Biography ==
Duša did not receive any artistic education and can therefore be called an autodidact. He liked traveling and visited, among other countries, Italy, Germany, Slovakia, Switzerland and Ukraine. In 1910 he started to work in a ceramics factory in the city of Rožnov pod Radhoštěm (in the Moravian-Silesian Beskids), but later failed in his attempts to establish an own enterprise. In 1927 he moved to Prague, where he further developed his artistic talent. He became a member of the Hollar association of Czech graphic artists, with the help of which he several times exhibited his pictures. In 1955 he returned to his birthplace of Frýdlant nad Ostravicí.

His best known illustrations accompanied poems of Petr Bezruč and Vojtěch Martínek. The elaboration of social themes is frequently found in his graphical work, the inspiration for which he drew from events of the 1920s and 1930s. In addition, he photographed and wrote love poems.

== Notable works ==
- Těšínsko – Region of Těšín/Tetschen (1920)
- Smutná země – A sad country (1922)
- Dolů Váhom – Down the Váh river (1933)
- Tatry – Tatra Mountains (1936)
- Na haldě – In the slag heap
- Důlní neštěstí – Mining disaster

== Literature ==
- PELIKÁNOVÁ, Gabriela; KAHÁNKOVÁ, Taťána, Rodáci a významné osobnosti Moravskoslezského kraje . Ostrava, Moravian-Silesian Region, 2006. Ostrava : Moravskoslezský kraj, 2006. S. 11 S. 11.

== See also ==
- List of Czech painters
