= Košťany nad Turcom =

- Municipality
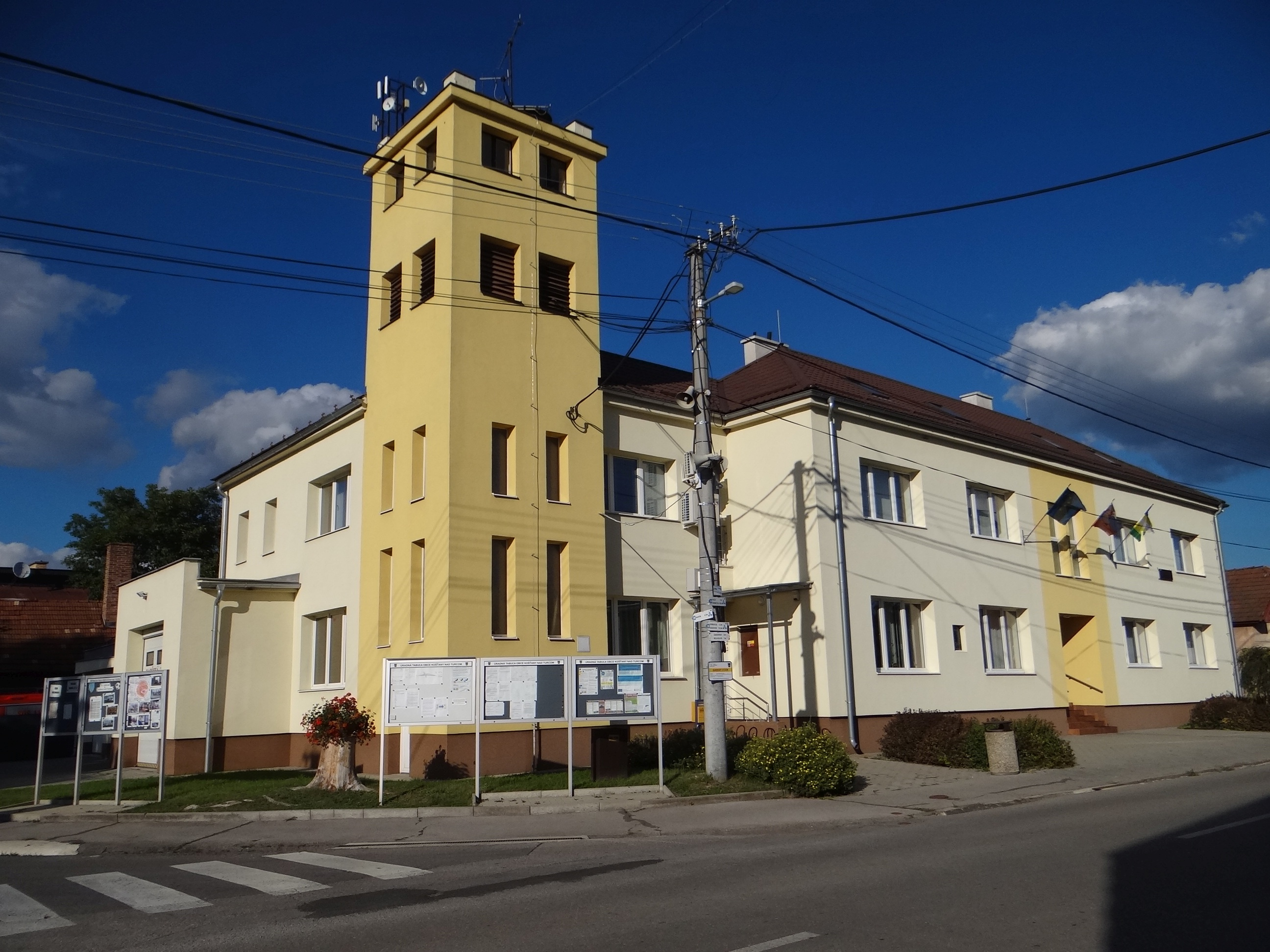

- Flag

- Location of Košťany nad Turcom in the Žilina Region Location of Košťany nad Turcom in Slovakia
- Coordinates: 49.03°N 18.90°E
- Country: Slovakia
- Region: Žilina Region
- District: Martin District
- First mentioned: 1323

Area
  - Total: 6.43 km^{2} (2.48 sq mi)
- Elevation: 415 m (1,362 ft)

Population (2025)
  - Total: 1,492
- Time zone: UTC+1 (CET)
  - Summer (DST): UTC+2 (CEST)
- Postal code: 384 1
- Area code: +421 43
- Vehicle registration plate (until 2022): MT
- Website: www.kostanynadturcom.sk

Košťany nad Turcom (Hungarian: Kostyán) is a village and municipality in Martin District, in Turiec territory, and in Žilina Region of northern Slovakia.

== History ==
In historical records of the village, a dwelling 'villa Coschan' was first mentioned in year 1323. Before the establishment of independent Czechoslovakia in 1918, it was part of Turóc County within the Kingdom of Hungary. From 1939 to 1945, it was part of the Slovak Republic.

Main occupation of locals has been focused on agriculture and seasonal food-harvests that were produced for various landlords who resided in Košťany nad Turcom ever since.

Abandoning feudal servitude Feudalism in 1848 and declaring basic freedom rights led residents to develop more commercial activities such crafts and trade. In the 20th century, especially during communist regime Joint agriculture and farming Collective farming remained major daily bread for locals.

Early years of new millennium have seen legislative support towards larger businesses, which led to few industrial factories growth in Košťany nad Turcom. In fact, most residents commute to Martin Martin, Slovakia, major workhub in Turiec.

== Geography ==
The municipality lies at an altitude of 415 metres (1,362 ft) and covers an area of 6.43 km^{2} (2.48 sq mi) (2025). It lies on Turiec river, Košťany nad Turcom as the whole Turiec basin (Turčianska kotlina) are surrounded by mountain range Greater Fatra (Veľká Fatra) on east-north and by mountain range Lesser Fatra (Malá Fatra) on west.

== Population ==
Population statistic (10 years)
Year	1995	2005	2015	2025
Count	1092	1096	1306	1492
Difference		+0.36%	+19.16%	+14.24%

Population statistic
Year	2024	2025
Count	1473	1492
Difference		+1.28%

It has a population of 1492 people (31 December 2025).

=== Ethnicity ===
Census 2021 (1+ %)
Ethnicity	Number	Fraction
Slovak	1267	94.83%
Not found out	58	4.34%
Total	1336	

In year 2021 was 1336 people by ethnicity 1267 as Slovak, 58 as Not found out, 12 as Czech, 3 as Romani, 3 as Hungarian, 2 as Ukrainian, 2 as Rusyn, 2 as Polish, 2 as Other, 1 as Romanian, 1 as German, 1 as Moravian and 1 as English.

Note on population: The difference values of population numbers in the table "Population statistic" and in the sections "Ethnicity" & "Religion" is caused by the use of various statistical methods.

=== Religion ===
Census 2021 (1+ %)
Religion	Number	Fraction
None	542	40.57%
Roman Catholic Church	411	30.76%
Evangelical Church	298	22.31%
Not found out	55	4.12%
Total	1336	

In year 2021 was 1336 people by religion 542 from None, 411 from Roman Catholic Church, 298 from Evangelical Church, 55 from Not found out, 9 from Greek Catholic Church, 7 from Ad hoc movements, 5 from Jehovah's Witnesses, 4 from Other and not ascertained christian church, 2 from Buddhism, 1 from Old Catholic Church, 1 from Calvinist Church and 1 from Paganism and natural spirituality.

== Sights ==
The main landmark of Košťany nad Turcom is the Košťany nad Turcom Castle. The Rococo-Neoclassical building dates from the second half of the 18th century. Today it houses a restaurant.

== Gallery ==
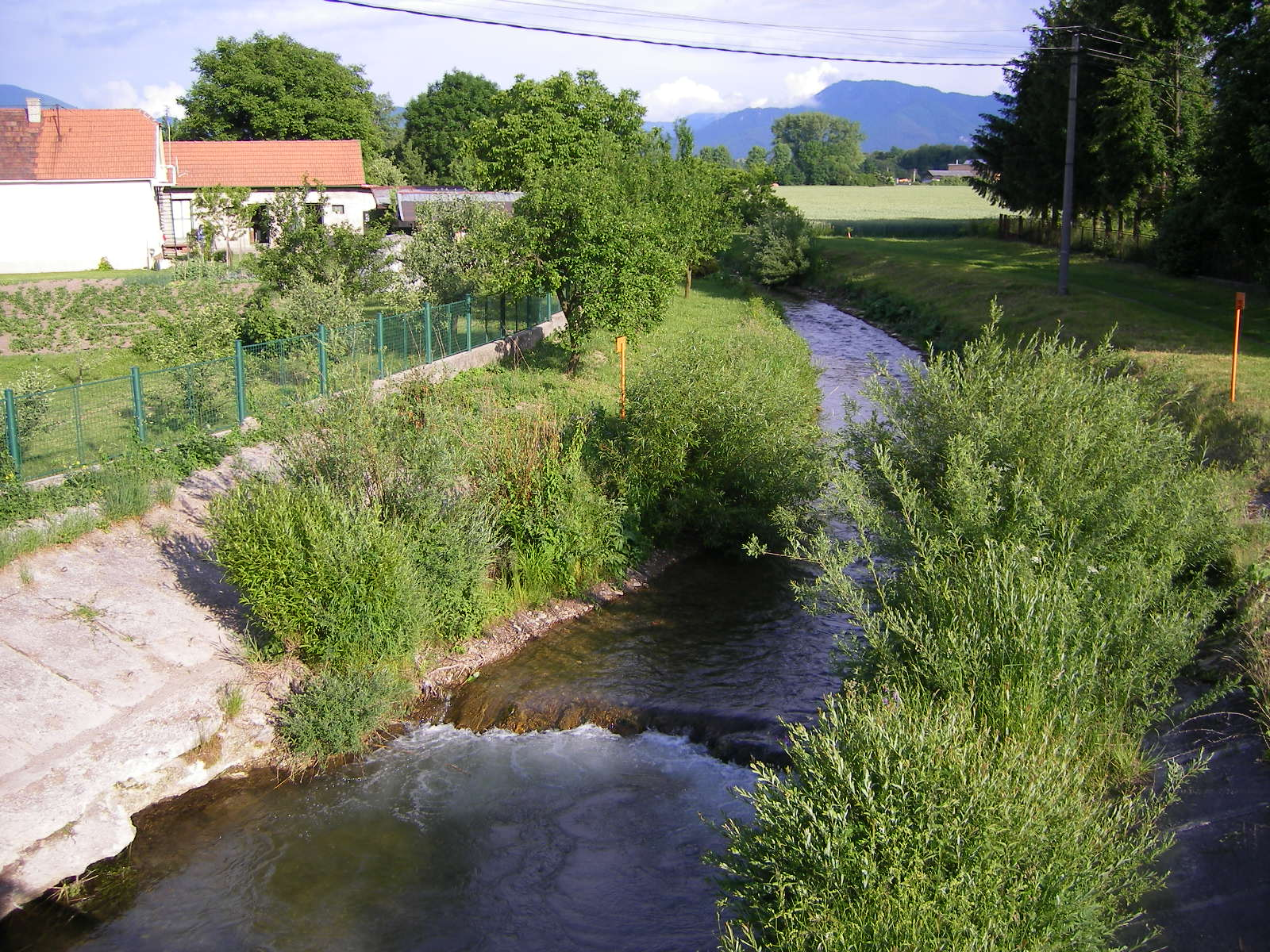
The stream Beliansky potok, peaks of Veľká Fatra mountain range in behind

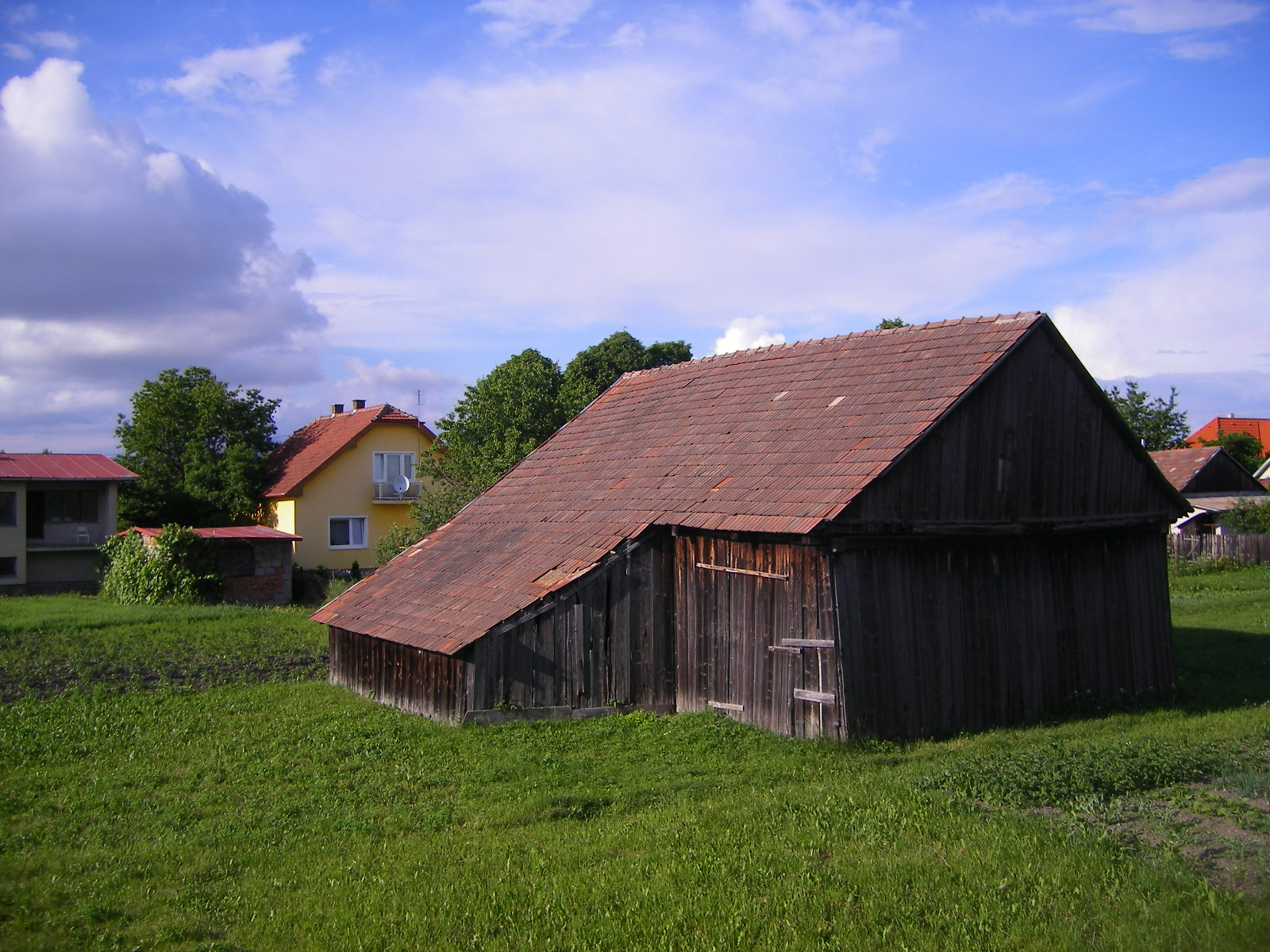
Košťany nad Turcom

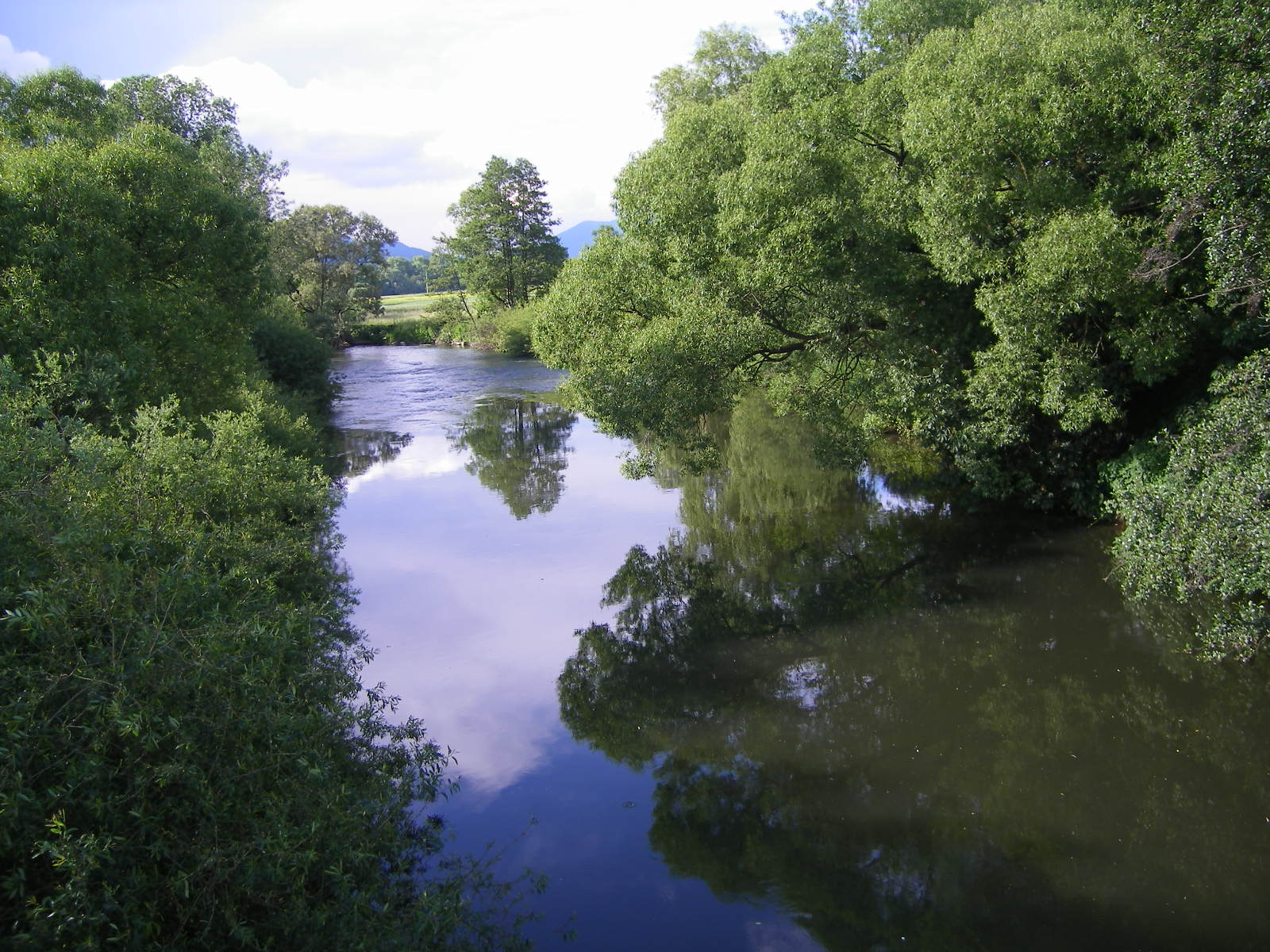
River Turiec flowing through Košťany nad Turcom

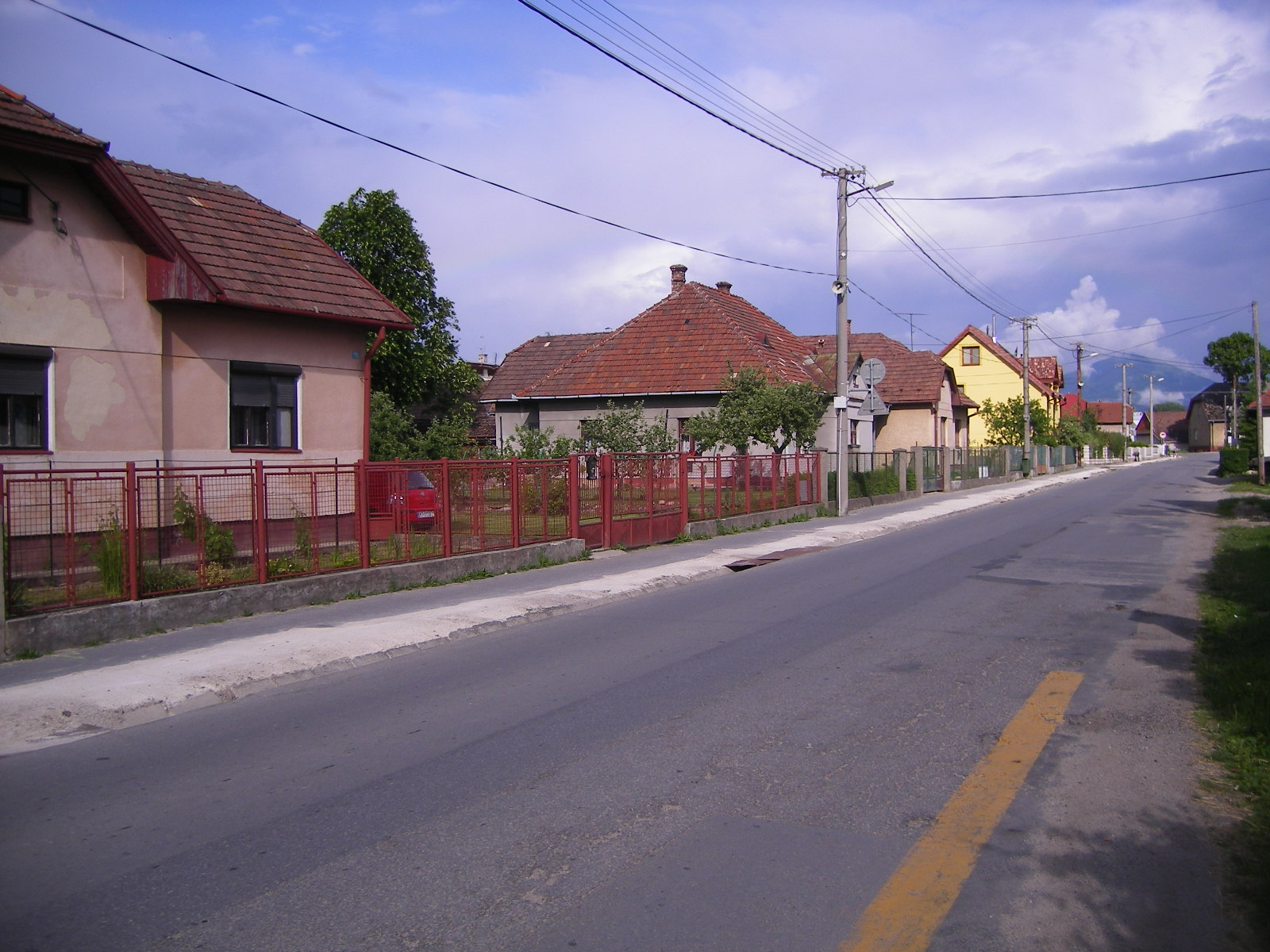
Street view

== Genealogical resources ==
The records for genealogical research are available at the state archive "Statny Archiv in Bytca, Slovakia"

- Roman Catholic church records (births/marriages/deaths): 1773-1941 (parish B)
- Lutheran church records (births/marriages/deaths): 1783-1928 (parish B)

== See also ==
- List of municipalities and towns in Slovakia
