= Metylovice =

- Municipality
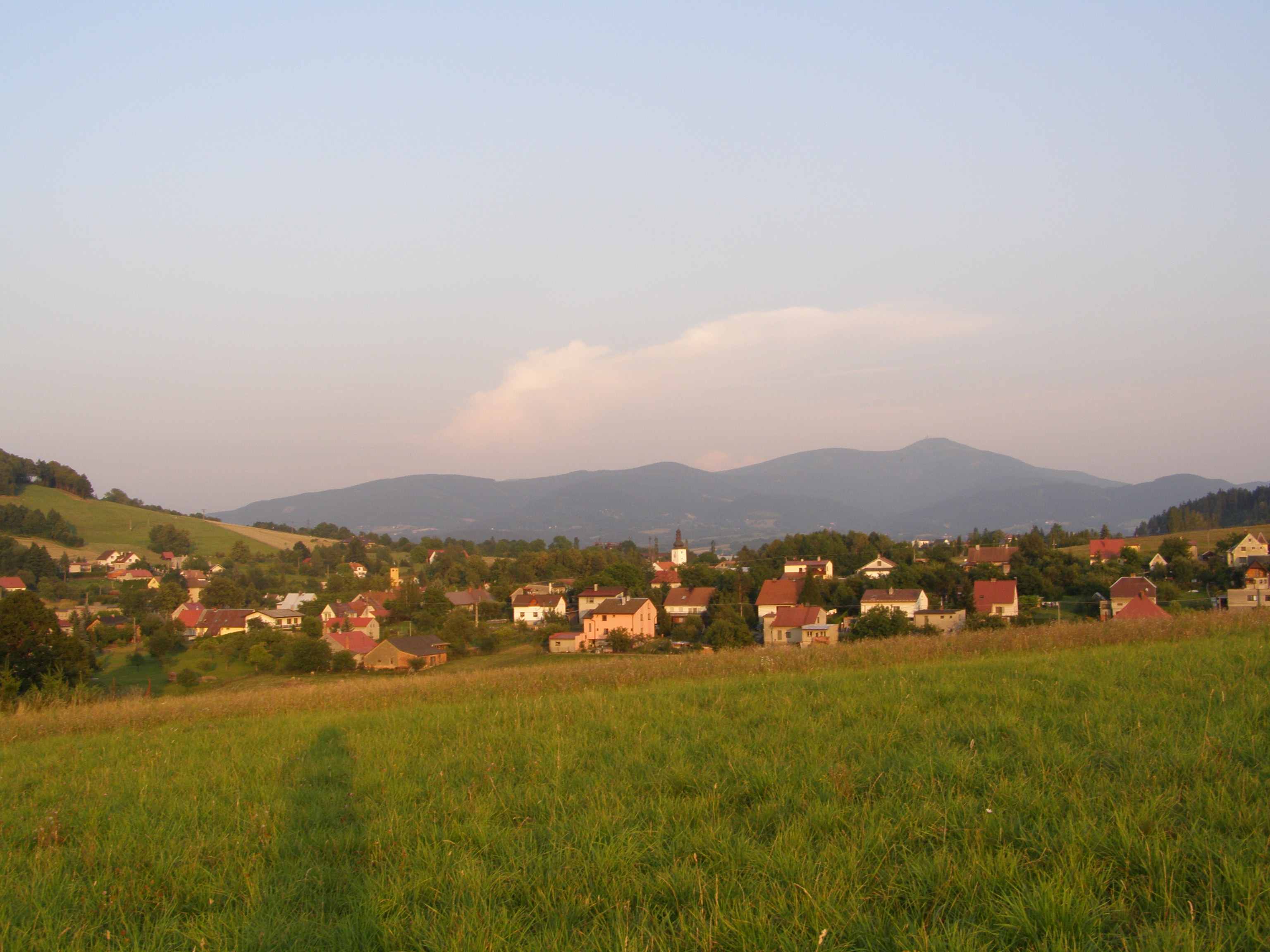
- View from the northwest

- Flag Coat of arms

- Location in the Czech Republic
- Coordinates: 49°36′24″N 18°20′21″E
- Country: Czech Republic
- Region: Moravian-Silesian
- District: Frýdek-Místek
- First mentioned: 1299

Area
  - Total: 11.15 km^{2} (4.31 sq mi)
- Elevation: 370 m (1,210 ft)

Population (2026-01-01)
  - Total: 1,790
  - Density: 161/km^{2} (416/sq mi)
- Time zone: UTC+1 (CET)
  - Summer (DST): UTC+2 (CEST)
- Postal code: 739 49
- Website: metylovice.cz

Metylovice (German: Mettilowitz) is a municipality and village in Frýdek-Místek District in the Moravian-Silesian Region of the Czech Republic. It has about 1,800 inhabitants.

== Geography ==
Metylovice is located about 7 kilometres (4 mi) south of Frýdek-Místek and 21 km (13 mi) south of Ostrava. It lies in the Moravian-Silesian Foothills. The highest point is the mountain Ondřejník at 890 m (2,920 ft) above sea level. The Olešná Stream flows through the municipality.

== History ==
The first written mention of Metylovice is in a deed of Bishop Dětřich from 1299. From the second half of the 17th century, tanning developed in the village, thanks to which the originally agricultural village began to prosper and grow. Brick houses began to replace the original wooden ones and the education and cultural life of the inhabitants increased.

== Demographics ==
Historical population

| Year | Pop. | ±% |
|---|---|---|
| 1869 | 1,279 | — |
| 1880 | 1,398 | +9.3% |
| 1890 | 1,350 | −3.4% |
| 1900 | 1,410 | +4.4% |
| 1910 | 1,612 | +14.3% |

| Year | Pop. | ±% |
|---|---|---|
| 1921 | 1,515 | −6.0% |
| 1930 | 1,644 | +8.5% |
| 1950 | 1,647 | +0.2% |
| 1961 | 1,701 | +3.3% |
| 1970 | 1,569 | −7.8% |

| Year | Pop. | ±% |
|---|---|---|
| 1980 | 1,549 | −1.3% |
| 1991 | 1,448 | −6.5% |
| 2001 | 1,491 | +3.0% |
| 2011 | 1,605 | +7.6% |
| 2021 | 1,705 | +6.2% |

Source: Censuses

== Transport ==
The I/56 road (which connects Frýdek-Místek with the I/35 road near the Czech–Slovak border) runs through the municipality.

== Sights ==
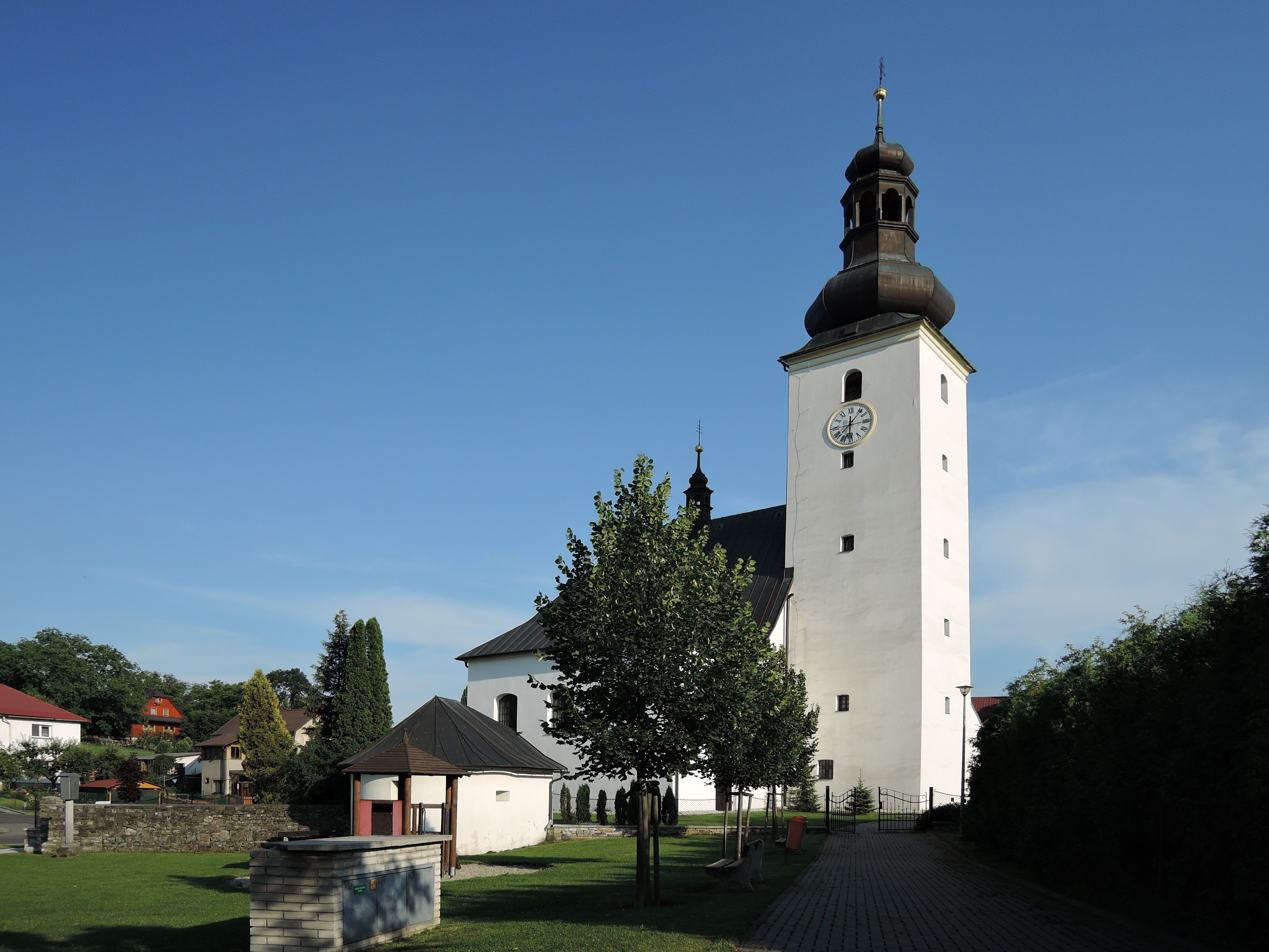
Church of All Saints

The main landmark of Metylovice is the Church of All Saints. It was built in Gothic style in 1577 on the site of an older wooden church, and later modified in the Baroque style.

== Twin towns – sister cities ==
Metylovice is twinned with:

- Krásno nad Kysucou, Slovakia
