= Tesař =

Tesař (feminine: Tesařová) is a Czech occupational surname literally meaning "carpenter". Notable people include:

- Heinz Tesar (1939–2024), Austrian architect
- Jan Tesař (athlete) (born 1990), Czech sprinter
- Jan Tesař (historian) (1933–2025), Czech historian and writer
- Jaroslav Tesař (born 1986), Czech footballer
- Linda Tesar (born c. 1961), American economist
- Lubor Tesař (born 1971), Czech cyclist
- Paul J. Tesar, American developmental biologist
- Pavel Tesař (born 1967), Czech cyclist
- Zdeněk Tesař (born 1964), Czech speedway rider
