= Valaliky =

Valaliky Valaliky
- Municipality
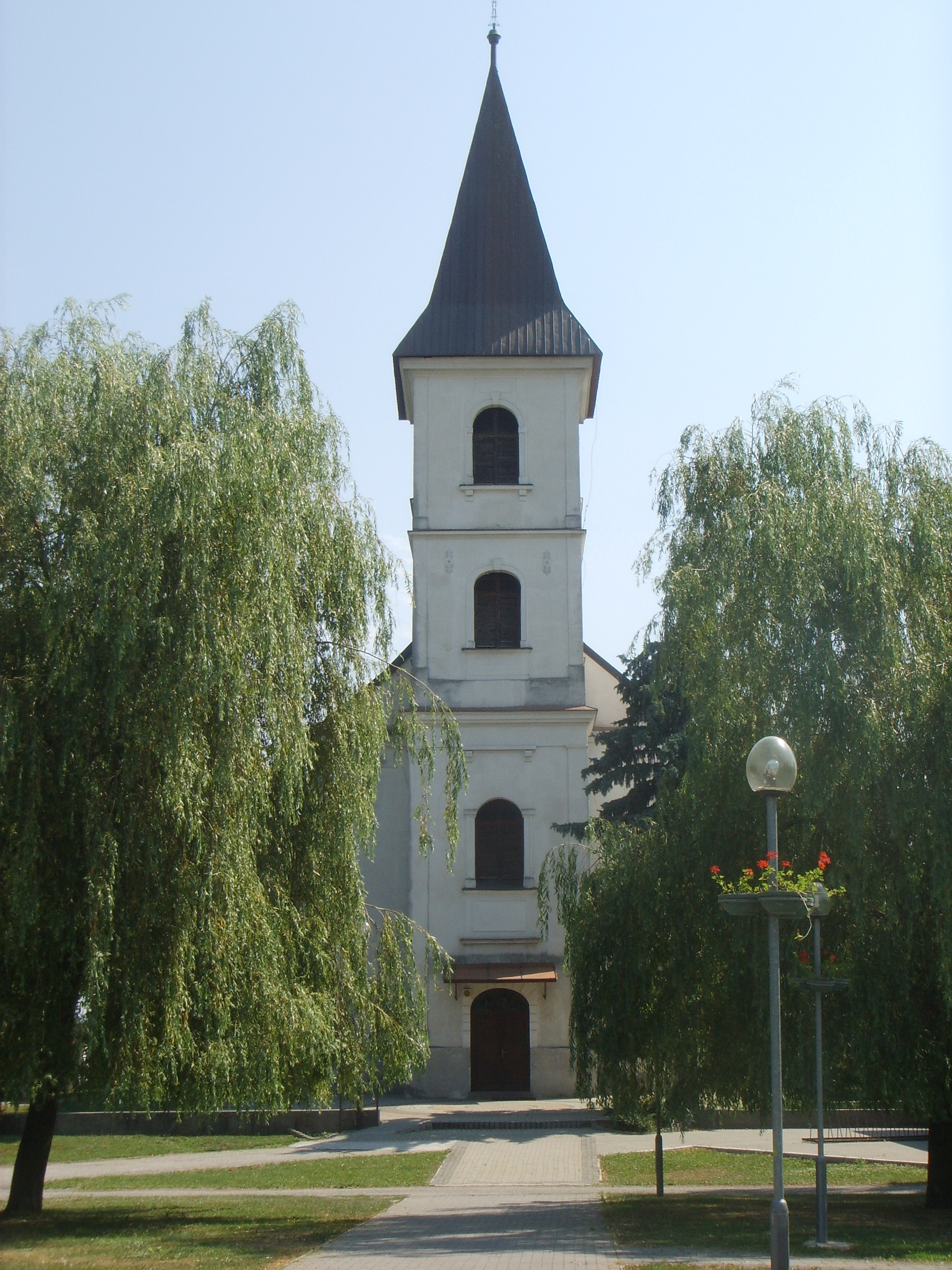

- Flag

- Location of Valaliky in the Košice Region Location of Valaliky in Slovakia
- Coordinates: 48.65°N 21.30°E
- Country: Slovakia
- Region: Košice Region
- District: Košice-okolie District
- First mentioned: 1961

Area
  - Total: 8.63 km^{2} (3.33 sq mi)
- Elevation: 185 m (607 ft)

Population (2025)
  - Total: 4,556
- Time zone: UTC+1 (CET)
  - Summer (DST): UTC+2 (CEST)
- Postal code: 441 3
- Area code: +421 55
- Vehicle registration plate (until 2022): KS
- Website: www.valaliky.sk

Valaliky is a village and municipality in Košice-okolie District in the Košice Region of eastern Slovakia.

== History ==
Valaliky´s municipality was established in 1961.

== Geography ==
The municipality lies at an altitude of 185 metres (607 ft) and covers an area of 8.63 km^{2} (3.33 sq mi) (2025). Originally, the earliest documents mentioning this village of about 3 890 inhabitants are from 14th century.

== Population ==
Population statistic (10 years)
Year	1995	2005	2015	2025
Count	3597	3923	4311	4556
Difference		+9.06%	+9.89%	+5.68%

Population statistic
Year	2024	2025
Count	4549	4556
Difference		+0.15%

It has a population of 4556 people (31 December 2025).

=== Ethnicity ===
Census 2021 (1+%)
Ethnicity	Number	Fraction
Slovak	4088	91.35%
Not found out	308	6.88%
Romani	165	3.68%
Total	4475	

In year 2021 was 4475 people by ethnicity 4088 as Slovak, 308 as Not found out, 165 as Romani, 22 as Czech, 22 as Hungarian, 20 as Rusyn, 13 as Other, 4 as Ukrainian, 3 as German, 3 as English, 2 as Russian, 2 as Austrian, 2 as Polish and 1 as Vietnamese.

Note on population: The difference values of population numbers in the table "Population statistic" and in the sections "Ethnicity" & "Religion" is caused by the use of various statistical methods.

=== Religion ===
Census 2021 (1+%)
Religion	Number	Fraction
Roman Catholic Church	3324	74.28%
None	522	11.66%
Not found out	303	6.77%
Greek Catholic Church	145	3.24%
Evangelical Church	46	1.03%
Total	4475	

In year 2021 was 4475 people by religion 3324 from Roman Catholic Church, 522 from None, 303 from Not found out, 145 from Greek Catholic Church, 46 from Evangelical Church, 32 from Calvinist Church, 25 from Other and not ascertained christian church, 22 from Other, 13 from Eastern Orthodox Church, 13 from Christian Congregations in Slovakia, 8 from Ad hoc movements, 7 from Jehovah's Witnesses, 6 from Apostolic Church, 4 from Paganism and natural spirituality, 2 from Church of the Brethren, 1 from Old Catholic Church, 1 from Czechoslovak Hussite Church and 1 from Seventh-day Adventist Church.
