= Petr Faldyna =

Czech footballer

Personal information
- Date of birth: 11 July 1976 (age 50)
- Place of birth: Frýdlant nad Ostravicí, Czechoslovakia
- Height: 1.86 m (6 ft 1 in)
- Position: Forward

Senior career*
Years	Team	Apps	(Gls)
2000–2001	Slovácko	0	(0)
2001	LeRK Prostějov	14	(1)
2001–2002	HFK Olomouc	8	(0)
2002–2003	Kunovice	33	(16)
2003–2004	Opava	24	(1)
2004–2006	Kunovice	41	(21)
2006	České Budějovice	15	(6)
2006–2009	Vysočina Jihlava	88	(41)
2009–2011	Senica	32	(2)
- * Club domestic league appearances and goals as of 31 December 2011

Petr Faldyna (born 11 July 1976 in Frýdlant nad Ostravicí) is a former professional Czech footballer. He was top scorer of the Czech 2. Liga for three consecutive seasons, 2005–06, 2006–07 and 2007–08.
