= 2000–01 Czech 2. Liga =

2. česká fotbalová liga
- Season: 2000–01
- Champions: Hradec Králové
- Promoted: Hradec Králové; Opava
- Relegated: Karviná; Třinec
- Matches played: 240
- Goals scored: 632 (2.63 per match)
- Top goalscorer: Pavel Černý (17)
- Average attendance: 1,269

The 2000–01 Czech 2. Liga was the eighth season of the 2. česká fotbalová liga, the second tier of the Czech football league.

== League standings ==
Pos	Team	Pld	W	D	L	GF	GA	GD	Pts	Promotion or relegation
1	Hradec Králové (C, P)	30	19	9	2	55	28	+27	66	Promotion to 2001–02 1. Liga
2	Opava (P)	30	17	9	4	57	20	+37	60	Promotion to 2001–02 1. Liga
3	Ratíškovice	30	14	9	7	43	26	+17	51	
4	Xaverov	30	14	8	8	51	30	+21	50	
5	Zlín	30	13	10	7	40	23	+17	49	
6	Jihlava	30	13	8	9	38	31	+7	47	
7	Pardubice	30	11	11	8	39	38	+1	44	
8	Most	30	9	11	10	27	27	0	38	
9	Vítkovice	30	9	10	11	37	43	−6	37	
10	Chomutov	30	10	6	14	46	50	−4	36	
11	Mladá Boleslav	30	9	9	12	34	42	−8	36	
12	Spolana Neratovice	30	10	5	15	39	50	−11	35	
13	Holice	30	10	5	15	38	45	−7	35	
14	Prostějov	30	7	11	12	31	47	−16	32	
15	Karviná (R)	30	6	4	20	24	62	−38	22	Relegation to 2001-02 MSFL
16	Třinec (R)	30	5	3	22	33	70	−37	18	Relegation to 2001-02 MSFL

Source: The Football Association of the Czech Republic
Rules for classification: 1) points; 2) goal difference; 3) number of goals scored.
(C) Champions; (P) Promoted; (R) Relegated

== Top goalscorers ==
Rank	Scorer	Club	Goals
1	(Czech Republic) Pavel Černý	Hradec Králové	17
2	(Czech Republic) Miroslav Jirka	Xaverov	14
3	(Czech Republic) Svatopluk Habanec	Chomutov	11
3	(Czech Republic) Aleš Hošťálek	Jihlava	11

== See also ==
- 2000–01 Czech First League
- 2000–01 Czech Cup
