= Dušan Tesařík =

Czech footballer

Personal information
- Date of birth: 21 March 1976 (age 50)
- Place of birth: Uherské Hradiště, Czechoslovakia
- Height: 1.74 m (5 ft 9 in)
- Position: Midfielder

Youth career
- Spartak Uherský Brod

Senior career*
Years	Team	Apps	(Gls)
1993-1997	Svit Zlín	76	(3)
1997–2006	Teplice	202	(18)
2006-2007	→ Marila Příbram (loan)	1	(0)
2007–2008	→ Baník Ostrava (loan)	6	(0)
2008–2009	Litvínov		
2009	Teplice	0	(0)

International career
1994	Czech Republic U18	1	(0)

Managerial career
- 2022–2023: Ústí nad Labem
- * Club domestic league appearances and goals

Dušan Tesařík (born 21 March 1976) is a Czech former professional football player. He made 256 appearances in the Czech First League, scoring 18 goals. He played one match for the under 18 team of the Czech Republic.

Tesařík had a long career at Teplice, where he played his last game at Olomouc on 10 May 2006. He later had short spells at Příbram and Ostrava in 2007. Injuries forced Teplice to recall Tesařík to their matchday squad for the match against Olomouc in November 2009, however he remained on the bench as an unused substitute.
