= Vojtěch Schulmeister =

Czech footballer

Personal information
- Full name: Vojtěch Schulmeister
- Date of birth: 9 September 1983 (age 43)
- Place of birth: Olomouc, Czechoslovakia
- Height: 1.82 m (6 ft 0 in)
- Position: Forward

Team information
- Current team: FK Velká Bystřice

Youth career
- 1990–1994: Lokomotíva Olomouc
- 1994–2001: Sigma Olomouc

Senior career*
Years	Team	Apps	(Gls)
2003–2008	Sigma Olomouc	56	(11)
2005	→ Chmel Blšany (loan)	12	(1)
2005	→ Hanácká Slavia Kroměříž (loan)	15	(1)
2008–2010	Heracles Almelo	31	(5)
2010	Hlučín	7	(0)
2011	Nitra	11	(1)
2011–2012	Almere City	12	(4)
2012	→ AGOVV Apeldoorn (loan)	14	(8)
2012–2013	AGOVV Apeldoorn	15	(4)
2013–2014	Termalica Bruk-Bet Nieciecza	15	(2)
2015	ATSV Ober-Grafendorf	6	(1)
2015–2017	SK Eggenburg	65	(47)
2018	USV Raxendorf		
2018	SV Oberndorf		
2021–	FK Velká Bystřice		

International career
2002–2003	Czech Republic U20	3	(1)
2004	Czech Republic U21	1	(0)
- * Club domestic league appearances and goals

Vojtěch Schulmeister (born 9 September 1983) is a Czech professional footballer who plays as a striker for FK Velká Bystřice.

== Career ==
Schulmeister played in the Czech First League with his hometown club, Sigma Olomouc.

Schulmeister joined Dutch side Heracles Almelo in the summer of 2008, alongside former Sigma-teammate Lukáš Bajer. Schulmeister impressed enough to stay with Heracles, while Bajer was forced to return to Sigma.
