= Pavel Simr =

Czech footballer

Personal information
- Date of birth: 6 July 1983 (age 43)
- Place of birth: Brno, Czechoslovakia
- Height: 1.88 m (6 ft 2 in)
- Position: Forward

Team information
- Current team: FC Velké Meziříčí

Youth career
- 1996–2002: Brno

Senior career*
Years	Team	Apps	(Gls)
2003–2009	Brno	28	(3)
2004–2005	→ Jihlava (loan)	28	(15)
2005	→ Mladá Boleslav (loan)	7	(1)
2006	→ Bystrc (loan)	9	(3)
2007	→ Jihlava (loan)	14	(8)
2008–2009	→ Nitra (loan)	4	(1)
2009–	Jihlava	27	(6)
2010–2011	→ Sezimovo Ústí (loan)	24	(4)
2011–	→ Velké Meziříčí (loan)		
- * Club domestic league appearances and goals as of 1 July 2011

Pavel Simr (born 6 July 1983) is a Czech footballer, who plays as a forward. He currently plays for FC Velké Meziříčí, on loan from Jihlava.
