= FC LeRK Brno =

- Full name: FC LeRK Brno
- Founded: 1910 as Sparta Královo Pole
- Dissolved: 1995 (merged with SK Prostějov)
- Final season 1994–95: 3rd in Czech 2. Liga
Home colours	Away colours

FC LeRK Brno was a Czech football club from the city of Brno. The club existed from 1910 until 1995, playing a single season in the Czechoslovak First League in 1961/62 under the name of Spartak Brno KPS. In the same season, the club took part in the 1961–62 Inter-Cities Fairs Cup. Following the breakup of Czechoslovakia, the club played in the Czech 2. Liga for two seasons. It then merged with SK Prostějov in 1995.

== Historical names ==
- Sparta Královo Pole (1910–22)
- SK Královo Pole (1922–48)
- Sokol GZ Královo Pole (1948–53)
- Spartak Královo Pole Brno (1953–61)
- Spartak Brno KPS (1961–63)
- TJ KPS Brno (1963–93)
- FC LeRK Brno (1993–95)
