= Olympiacos F.C. in European football =

Greek club in European football

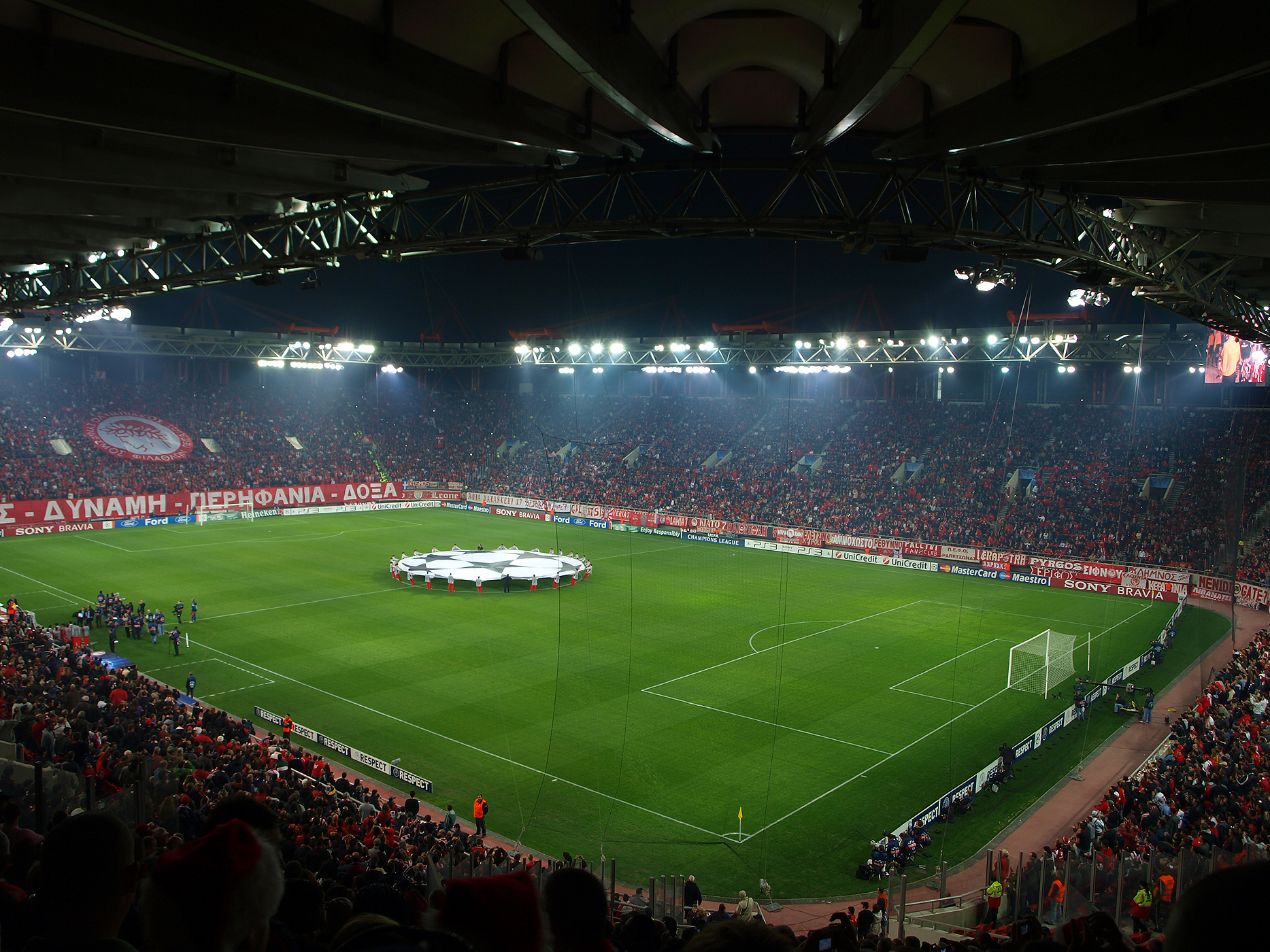
- Olympiacos home ground Karaiskakis Stadium in a 2009–10 UEFA Champions League 1–0 win against Arsenal
- Club: Olympiacos
- Most appearances: Predrag Đorđević (83)
- Top scorer: Ayoub El Kaabi (26)
- First entry: 1959–60 European Cup
- Latest entry: 2026–27 UEFA Europa League

Titles
- Conference League: 1: 2024

Olympiacos F.C. is a Greek football club based in Piraeus. It has a long presence in UEFA competitions, making its debut on 13 September 1959, against AC Milan for the 1959–60 European Cup, the first Greek club to compete in a UEFA–sanctioned European competition. It also won the UEFA Europa Conference League in the 2023–24 season against Fiorentina, becoming the first Greek club to win a European competition.

Olympiacos is the most successful Greek football club in European competitions, being the only club from Greece in history to have won a major European trophy; they won the UEFA Europa Conference League in 2023–24, sealing their title by winning against Italian side Fiorentina 1–0 in the Final. With their 2024 triumph, they became the first club outside the biggest four European leagues (Premier League, Serie A, La Liga and Bundesliga) to win a UEFA competition since 2011.

They are the highest ranked Greek club in the UEFA rankings, occupying the 36th place in the ten-year ranking, and the 43rd in the five-year ranking as of 2024. They are also the Greek club with the most wins in all European competitions, leading also the table with the most home and away wins, and the Greek team with the most games played in European level, celebrating their 200th match on 23 February 2010, against Bordeaux in the 2009–10 UEFA Champions League first knockout round. Olympiacos also holds the all-time record attendance for a Greek club of 75,263 in a 1982–83 European Cup match against Hamburg at the Athens Olympic Stadium. They are one of the founding members of the European Club Association.

Besides their 2023–24 UEFA Conference League triumph, other major European successes include their advance to the quarter-finals of the UEFA Champions League in 1998–99, where they lost a semi-final spot in the dying minutes to Juventus and their advance to the quarter-finals of the UEFA Cup Winners' Cup in 1992–93, losing to Atlético Madrid.

Olympiacos has eliminated (in either finals, knockout matches or group stages) clubs like Milan, Arsenal, Ajax, Benfica, Porto, Borussia Dortmund, Lazio, Celtic, PSV Eindhoven, Aston Villa, Werder Bremen, Fiorentina, Anderlecht, Monaco, Deportivo La Coruña, Hertha BSC, Cagliari and Standard Liège among many others. They have spent most of their European history in the UEFA Champions League, where they are widely known for being a strong home side, having run some long-standing sequences, such as the 15 straight UEFA Champions League unbeaten home matches since their debut in the tournament under its new format, when Manchester United stopped their record in their fifth consecutive participation, and their 15 wins in 19 UEFA Champions League home matches between 2009–10 and 2014–15. They have a vast record of home wins over traditional European powerhouses and UEFA Champions League winners like Real Madrid, Milan, Liverpool, Manchester United, Ajax, Juventus, Arsenal, Borussia Dortmund, Benfica, Porto, PSV Eindhoven, Celtic, Aston Villa, Olympique Lyonnais, Olympique Marseille, Atlético Madrid, Valencia, Sevilla, Leverkusen and Red Star Belgrade among many others. From 2007 to 2016, Olympiacos participated seven times in the UEFA Champions League Group Stage, and gathered at least 9 points in every one of those seven groups, qualifying three times for the knockout stage (Last 16) of the competition (2007–08, 2009–10, 2013–14).

Olympiacos has also won the Balkans Cup in 1963, at a time when the competition was considered the second most important in the region after the European Cup, becoming the first ever Greek club to win an international competition.

Another major European success was achieved by Olympiacos U-19 team in 2023–24 season. One month before Olympiacos won the 2023–24 UEFA Europa Conference League, Olympiacos U-19 team won the UEFA Youth League against AC Milan in the final, eliminating Inter Milan, Bayern Munich and Nantes in the process. Thus, Olympiacos won two out of four official UEFA club competitions of the 2023–24 season and became the only club in European football to have won two UEFA competitions at the same season.

== History ==
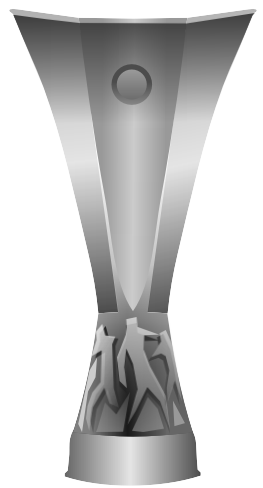
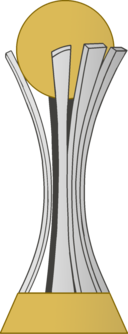
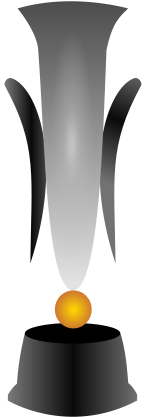
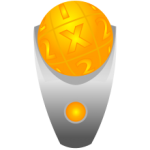
Club											Total Titles
Olympiacos F.C.	-	1	-	1	-	-	X	X	X	X	2

=== First Greek club to play in the European competitions: Olympiacos–Milan (1959) ===
Olympiacos has a long presence in UEFA competitions, debuting on 13 September 1959 against Milan for the 1959–60 European Cup, being the first Greek club to participate in the European competitions. The first leg was held at Olympiacos home ground in Piraeus, with approximately 20,000 Olympiacos fans crowding Karaiskakis Stadium and creating an intense atmosphere. Olympiacos took the lead with a goal by Kostas Papazoglou (1–0), which was the first goal ever scored by a Greek club and by a Greek player as well in European competitions. Milan's prolific goalscorer José Altafini equalised the match with a header in the 33rd minute, after a cross by Giancarlo Danova. Ilias Yfantis scored an outstanding goal and gave Olympiacos the lead again in the 45th minute of the game, when he controlled the ball between Cesare Maldini and Vincenzo Occhetta and unleashed a powerful volley, burying the ball into the back of the net (2–1). Altafini scored his second goal once again with a header (72nd minute), after a free-kick by Nils Liedholm.

The match ended 2–2, with Olympiacos putting in a great performance against the Italian champions, despite the fact that they had no foreign players in their roster, while Milan had four world-class foreign players, such as Altafini, Liedholm, Juan Alberto Schiaffino and Ernesto Grillo. In the second leg Milan won 3–1 (Giancarlo Danova 12', 26', 85'–Ilias Yfantis 68') and qualified for the next round, despite Olympiacos strong performance especially in the second half.

=== Balkans Cup Winners (1963) ===
In 1963, Olympiacos became the first ever Greek club to win a non-domestic competition, winning the Balkans Cup, which marked the first international success by any Greek football club. The Balkans Cup was a very popular international competition in the 1960s (the 1967 final attracted 42,000 spectators), being the second most important international club competition for clubs from the Balkans (after the European Champions' Cup). Olympiacos topped his group after some notable wins, beating Galatasaray 1–0 at the Karaiskakis Stadium, with Stelios Psychos scoring the decisive goal in 49th minute of the game, as well as FK Sarajevo (3–2) and FC Brașov (1–0), bagging also two away draws against Galatasaray (1–1) in Mithatpaşa Stadium (Metin Oktay 78' – Aristeidis Papazoglou 6') and FK Sarajevo in Koševo Stadium (3–3).

In the final, they faced Levski Sofia, winning the first match in Piraeus (1–0, Giorgos Sideris 37') and losing the second match in Vasil Levski Stadium with the same score. In the third decisive final in Istanbul (a neutral ground), in front of 25,000 fans who filled Mithatpaşa Stadium, Olympiacos beat Levski 1–0 with a goal by Mimis Stefanakos in the 87th minute and won the Balkans Cup.

=== First Greek club to advance to the next round of any European competition (1963–64) ===
In 1963, Olympiacos became the first Greek team to advance to the next round of any European competition, eliminating Zagłębie Sosnowiec from Poland for the 1963–64 European Cup Winners' Cup. They won the first match in Piraeus 2–1, lost the second leg in Poland 1–0 and beat Zagłębie 2–0 in the third decisive match. In the next phase, they faced Lyon and despite their 2–1 win in Georgios Karaiskakis Stadium they were eliminated by the strong French side.

=== Eliminating Riva's Cagliari and Dalglish's Celtic, Palotai denies quarter-finals spot (1972–75) ===
In the 1972–75 Goulandris era, Olympiacos had a solid presence in European competitions, eliminating great clubs, and losing their qualification to the quarter-finals of the 1975 European Cup in a highly controversial game. They managed to eliminate Cagliari in the 1972–73 UEFA Cup, a major force in Italian football during the late 1960s and the early 1970s, (1970 Serie A Champions, 1972 Serie A title contenders), with world-class Italian international players like Gigi Riva, Angelo Domenghini, Enrico Albertosi, Pierluigi Cera, Sergio Gori and Fabrizio Poletti. Olympiacos managed to beat Cagliari twice, 2–1 in Piraeus and 1–0 in Cagliari, becoming the first ever Greek football club to win on Italian soil. In the next round they faced the competition's defending champions Tottenham Hotspur, who were undefeated for 16-straight games in all European competitions. Olympiacos did not manage to qualify against Spurs, but they managed to get a 1–0 win in Piraeus, which ended Tottenham's undefeated streak and marked the first ever victory of a Greek football club against an English side. Two years later, Olympiacos entered the 1974–75 European Cup and they were drawn to face Kenny Dalglish's Celtic, one of the strongest teams in European football at that time and semi-finalists of the previous season. The first leg was played in Celtic Park, where Celtic had never been defeated, running an undefeated streak of 36 straight home games in all European competitions (27 wins, 9 draws) from 1962 to 1974. Olympiacos took the lead through Milton Viera's strike in the 36th minute, with Celtic equalising late in the game. The away draw gave Olympiacos the advantage and they finished the job in Piraeus, after a spectacular 2–0 win against the Scottish Champions with Kritikopoulos and Stavropoulos finding the net. In the next round, they were drawn to play against Anderlecht for a place in the quarter-finals of the competition. Anderlecht won the first leg with 5–1 and Olympiacos' task seemed impossible. In the second leg in Greece, however, Olympiacos put on a dominant display and almost reached a winning score in a match that was marked by referee Károly Palotai's decisions. Olympiacos beat Anderlecht 3–0, while Palotai disallowed four Olympiacos goals and did not give at least three clear penalties committed by Anderlecht players, while Stavropoulos was shown a red card for no good reason. The match is widely known in Greece as the "Palotai massacre" with Olympiacos coming close to one of the biggest comebacks in European Cup history.

=== Eliminating AFC Ajax in European Cup (1983) ===
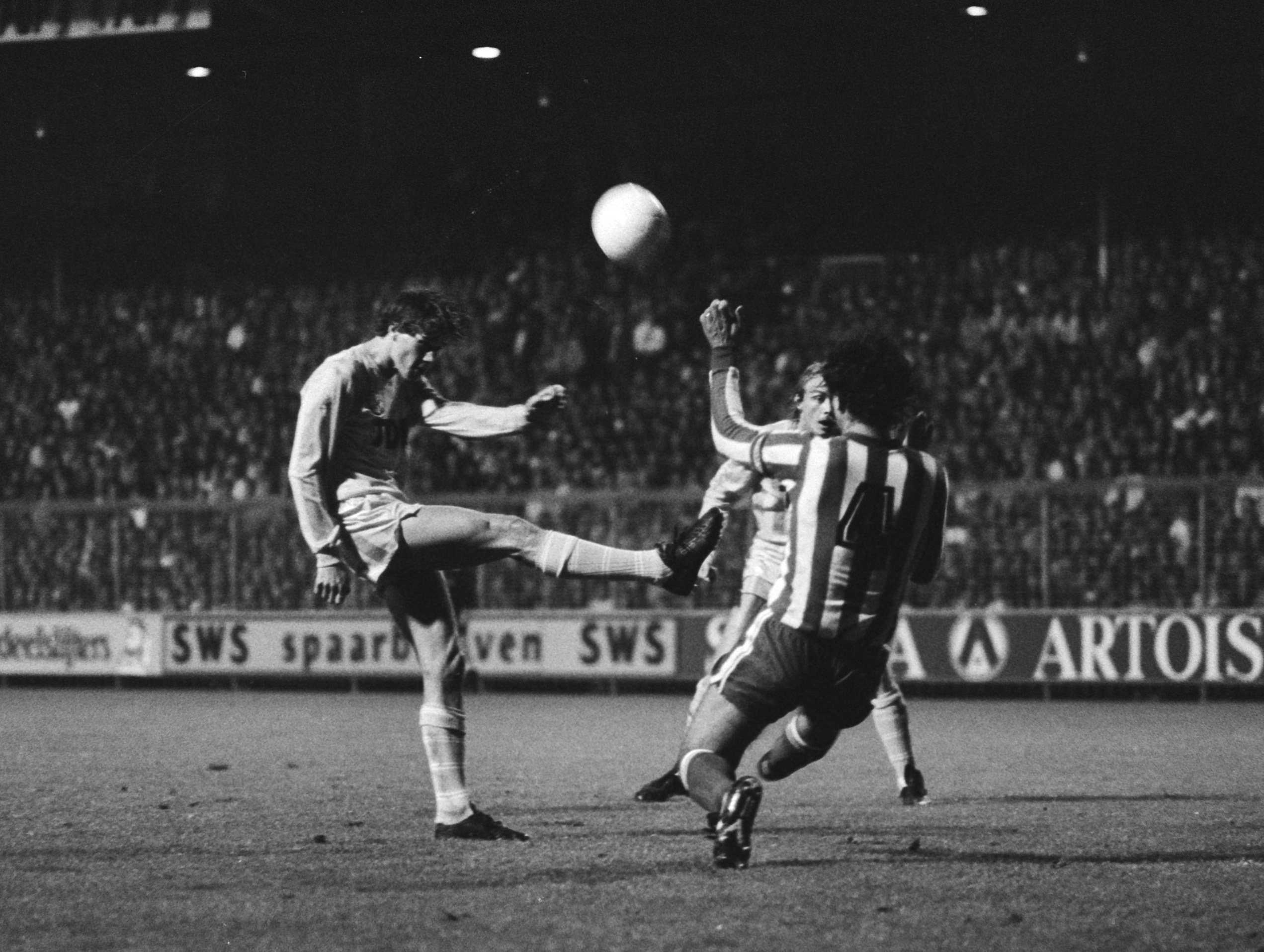
Ajax's Marco Van Basten facing Olympiacos' Stavros Papadopoulos in De Meer Stadion for the 1983–84 European Cup (0–0)

In 1983 Olympiacos entered the 1983–84 European Cup and were drawn against the European powerhouse and Dutch champions AFC Ajax of world-class players like Marco van Basten, Ronald Koeman and Frank Rijkaard. The first leg was held in Amsterdam and ended with 0–0 draw, with Olympiacos holding firm and taking the advantage for the second leg.

The second match in Athens was a thriller and a further goalless stalemate, before extra-time when Nikos Anastopoulos scored twice (95', 118') and send Olympiacos through, causing the 80,000 Olympiacos fans in the Olympic Stadium of Athens to burst into frenetic celebrations. In the Last 16 they faced Portuguese club Benfica, but despite their comfortable 1–0 in Athens, where Anastopoulos scored the goal and lost a crucial penalty as well, they were eliminated after a 3–0 defeat in Lisbon.

=== UEFA Cup Winners' Cup quarter-finalists (1992–93) ===
In 1992 Olympiacos, coached by Oleh Blokhin, entered the 1992–93 European Cup Winners' Cup and after eliminating Chornomorets Odesa in the first round, they were drawn against Arsène Wenger's AS Monaco, a very strong side with players like Jürgen Klinsmann, Youri Djorkaeff, Lilian Thuram and Jean-Luc Ettori. Olympiacos eliminated Monaco and reached the quarter-finals after a hard-fought 1–0 away win in Stade Louis II with a goal by Giorgos Vaitsis in the 86th minute and a goalless draw in Karaiskakis Stadium in the second match. They weren't able to qualify for the semi-finals, as they were eliminated by Atlético Madrid, with 1–1 draw at home and 3–1 loss in Vicente Calderón.

=== Near-miss to UEFA Champions League semi-finals (1998–99) ===
In the 1998–99 UEFA Champions League, one of the most talented ever Olympiacos sides came close to a semi-final appearance. Their campaign began in the second qualifying round, with Cypriot side Anorthosis not able to prevent them from participating in the group stage for a second time in a row. They were drawn in Group A along with Croatia Zagreb, Porto and Ajax, where they managed to win all three home games (Ajax 1–0, Porto 2–1 and Croatia Zagreb 2–0) and secure two away draws in Porto (2–2) and Zagreb (1–1), topping the group and getting the ticket for the quarter-finals. There, they were drawn to face Juventus, one of the favourites to win the trophy. In the first leg at the Stadio delle Alpi in Turin, Juventus took a 2–0 lead, but Olympiacos scored a crucial away goal in the 90th minute of the game with a penalty by Andreas Niniadis, a goal that caused the 10.000 Olympiacos fans who travelled to Italy to erupt into joyous ecstasy. The 2–1 scoreline meant that the Greek team only needed a 1–0 victory in Athens to proceed. In the second leg, Olympiacos had a vintage performance and totally dominated the match. They scored the goal that put them in the driving seat in the 12th minute of the game, when Siniša Gogić's powerful header found the back of the net after Grigoris Georgatos's superb cross. They also missed an outstanding chance to double the lead, when Giorgos Amanatidis' powerful header from short distance was saved by Michelangelo Rampulla. Olympiacos never allowed Juventus to create any dangerous situations throughout the game (they had zero chances to score) and kept the ticket to the semi-finals in his hands until the 85th minute, when the Italian side equalised the score after a crucial mistake by goalkeeper Dimitris Eleftheropoulos, who misjudged the flight of the ball in a seemingly harmless cross by Alessandro Birindelli. Eleftheropoulos had been the team's hero in all the previous games, but his mistake condemned Olympiacos, who pushed on in the last 5 minutes to find a goal, but to no avail.

=== Three UEFA Champions League Last 16 qualifications in six years (2008–14) ===
==== 2007–08 UEFA Champions League campaign ====
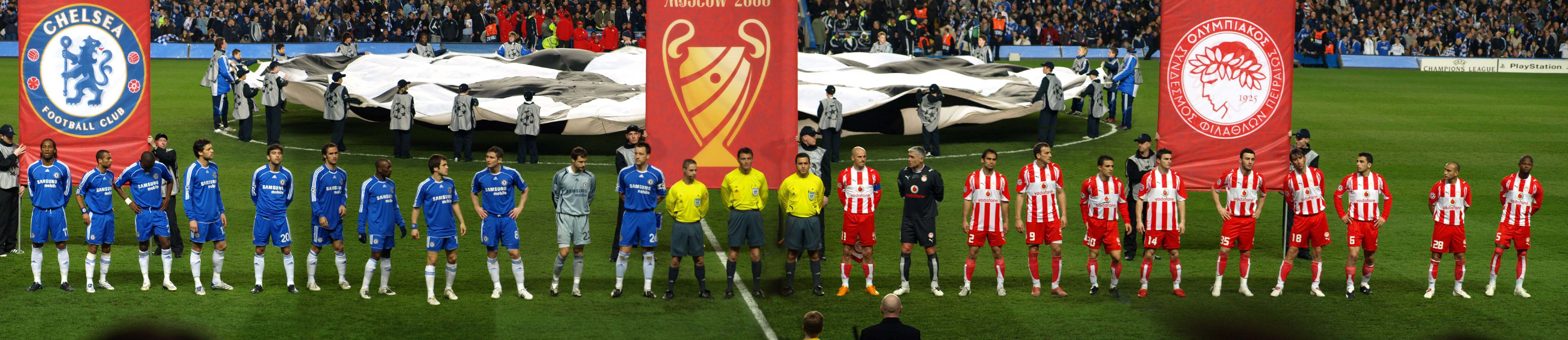
Chelsea and Olympiacos players arrayed in Stamford Bridge, in the second match for the 2007–08 UEFA Champions League first knockout round.

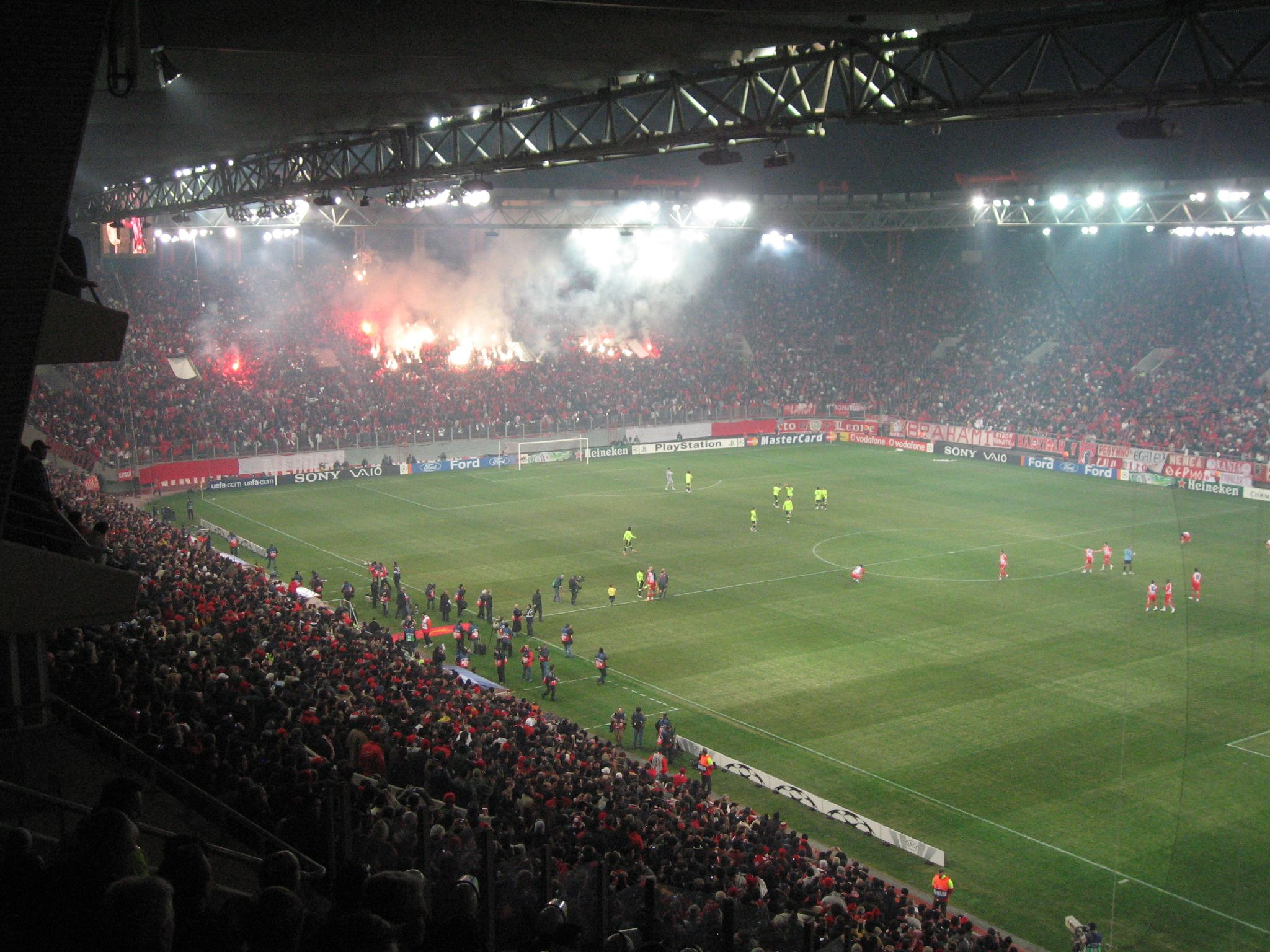
The first match between Olympiacos and Chelsea in Karaiskakis Stadium for the 2007–08 UEFA Champions League first knockout round.

In the 2007–08 UEFA Champions League, Olympiacos had an exceptional European campaign. Drawn in one of the toughest groups of the tournament along with Real Madrid, Werder Bremen and Lazio, Olympiacos finished second with eleven points, the same with group-winners Real Madrid, with the Spanish club taking the top place due to the better results in the two Olympiacos–Real Madrid matches. Following a draw 1–1 to Lazio at home, Olympiacos grabbed a spectacular 3–1 away win against Werder Bremen in Weserstadion, turning the game around from 0–1. In the third game, Olympiacos were finally defeated 4–2 to Real Madrid at the Santiago Bernabéu Stadium, after a heart-breaking match in which the Greek team was playing with 10 men from the 13th minute and was leading the score to the 68th with 2–1, turning it around from 0–1 and wasting a lot of chances to score more. Real Madrid scored their third goal in the 83rd, but Olympiacos came close to score many times during the last minutes of the match and leave Madrid with the draw, when Real secured the win with a last-minute goal, following an outstanding Olympiacos chance to equalise the score, with Iker Casillas saving Darko Kovačević's powerful header from close. Olympiacos opened the second round of the group stage with a draw 0–0 to Real Madrid at the Karaiskakis Stadium and kept alive the record of being undefeated by Real Madrid in Athens in four matches, while the Reds moved a step closer to qualifying for the Last 16 after coming from behind to defeat Lazio 2–1 in Stadio Olimpico. On 11 December, Olympiacos smashed Werder Bremen 3–0 at Karaiskakis Stadium, which ensured their place in the knockout stage of the tournament, where they faced Chelsea. At the first match in Piraeus, the Reds had a scoreless draw against the Blues, but were eliminated in the second leg at the Stamford Bridge after their 3–0 loss.

==== 2009–10 UEFA Champions League campaign ====
In the 2009–10 UEFA Champions League, Olympiacos was drawn in a group against Arsenal, Standard Liège and AZ Alkmaar and qualified comfortably for the Last 16 with 10 points, winning all three games at home against Arsenal (1–0), Standard Liège (2–1) and Alkmaar (1–0), and drawing the match in Alkmaar (0–0). In the knockout stage, they faced Bordeaux and they lost 0–1 in the first round at home, in a closely contested match. In the second match, despite Bordeaux's early lead, Olympiacos leveled the match and missed some great chances to score a second goal, before eventually losing in the dying moments of the match (1–2).

==== 2013–14 UEFA Champions League campaign ====
In the 2013–14 Champions League, they were drawn in Group C against Paris Saint-Germain, Benfica and Anderlecht. After a great performance in the group, Olympiacos finished second with ten points and qualified for the Last 16, eliminating Benfica (1–0 win in Piraeus, 1–1 draw in Lisbon) and Anderlecht (0–3 win in Brussels, 3–1 win in Piraeus). In the Last 16, they were drawn to play against Manchester United, who had never lost to a Greek club before. Olympiacos, after a top-class performance, won the first leg with a convincing 2–0, in a match where they dominated totally and missed chances to even extend the lead. Despite the two-goal advantage which put them within touching distance of a quarter-final place for the first time since 1999, Olympiacos lost 3–0 in the second leg in Old Trafford, having missed an outstanding double chance to equalize the score in the 40th minute. The Greek champions pushed on in the last ten minutes to find the crucial away goal, but they couldn't score.

=== European glory: UEFA Europa Conference League Winners (2023–24) ===
Olympiacos became the only Greek football club to have won a major UEFA competition, after their 2023–24 UEFA Europa Conference League triumph.

2024 UEFA Europa Conference League final starting lineup against Fiorentina on 29 May 2024

The European campaign of this season will remain unforgettable for Olympiacos' fans and players. Beginning in the Europa League third qualifying round, the club ensured a group stage participation for the third season in a row, after knocking out Belgian KRC Genk and Serbian rookies FK Čukarički. There, they secured the 3rd place, finishing with 7 points and transferring to the Europa Conference League. After knocking out Hungarian champion Ferencváros in the play-offs with 2 Ayoub El Kaabi goals, they faced Israeli Maccabi Tel Aviv in the Round of 16, and got stunned by a 1–4 defeat at Karaiskakis Stadium. However, in the return fixture in TSC Arena, in front of 49 loyal supporters, the Reds managed to achieve one of the greatest comebacks in the history of European football, by winning 6–1 on extra time and becoming the only football club to overcome a 3-goal home deficit in UEFA competitions.

Entering a European quarter-final for the first time since 1998-99, their next opponent were Fenerbahçe, whom they beat 3–2 at home, thanks to goals from Kostas Fortounis, Stevan Jovetić and Chiquinho. In the second leg in Şükrü Saracoğlu, the game ended 1–0 in favour of Fenerbahçe, thanks to a 12th-minute İrfan Kahveci goal. Eventually, the tie went to an extra time and then to a penalty shootout. There, 21-year old goalkeeper Konstantinos Tzolakis made history, saving 3 penalties in total, including the decisive one by Leonardo Bonucci and earning Olympiacos its first-ever appearance in a European semi-final in their 99-year history, winning 2–3 on penalties.

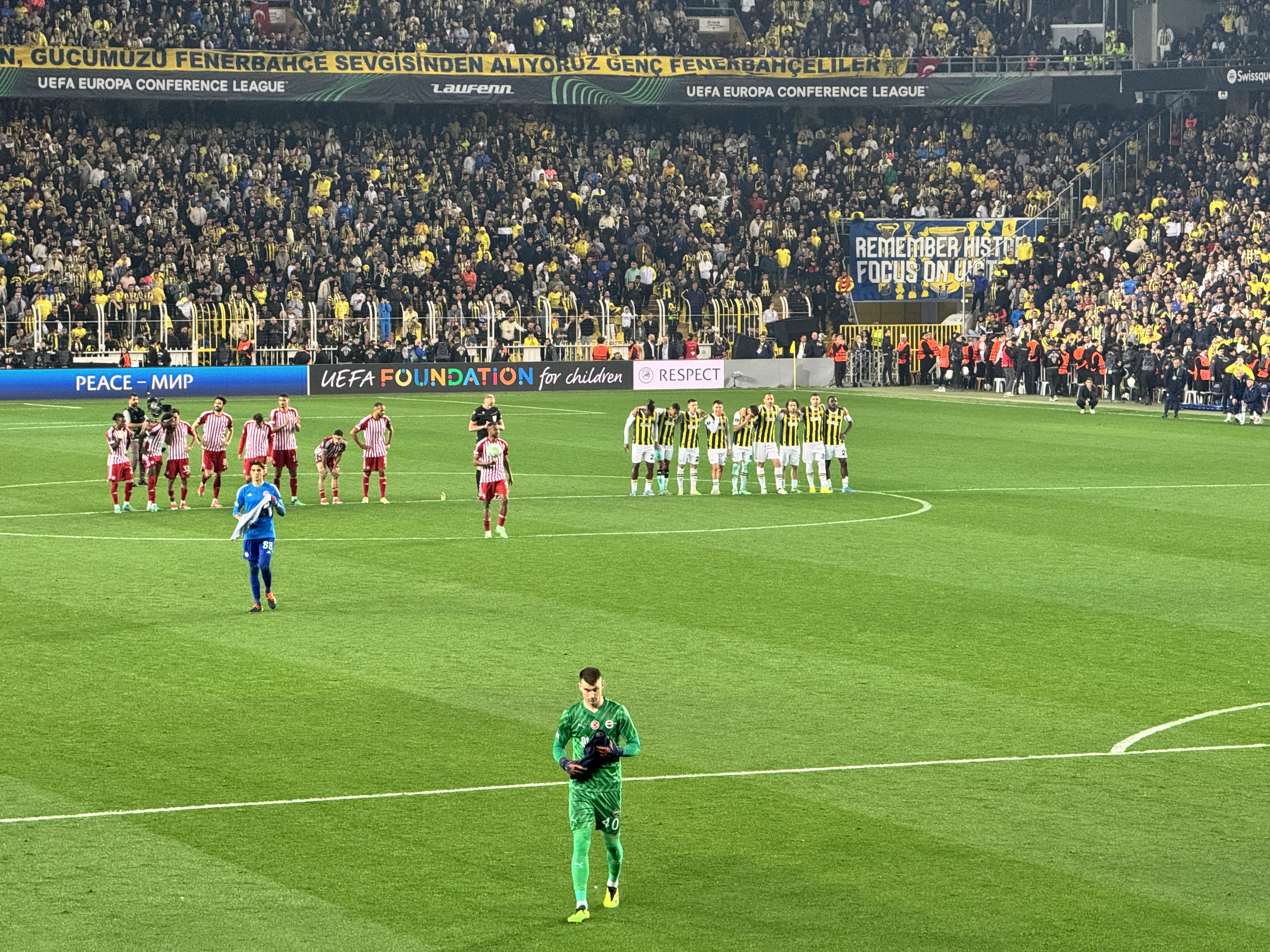
Olympiacos eliminated Turkish club Fenerbahçe (2–3 on penalties) in the quarter-finals of the 2023–24 UEFA Europa Conference League, with goalkeeper Konstantinos Tzolakis saving 3 penalties in the process.

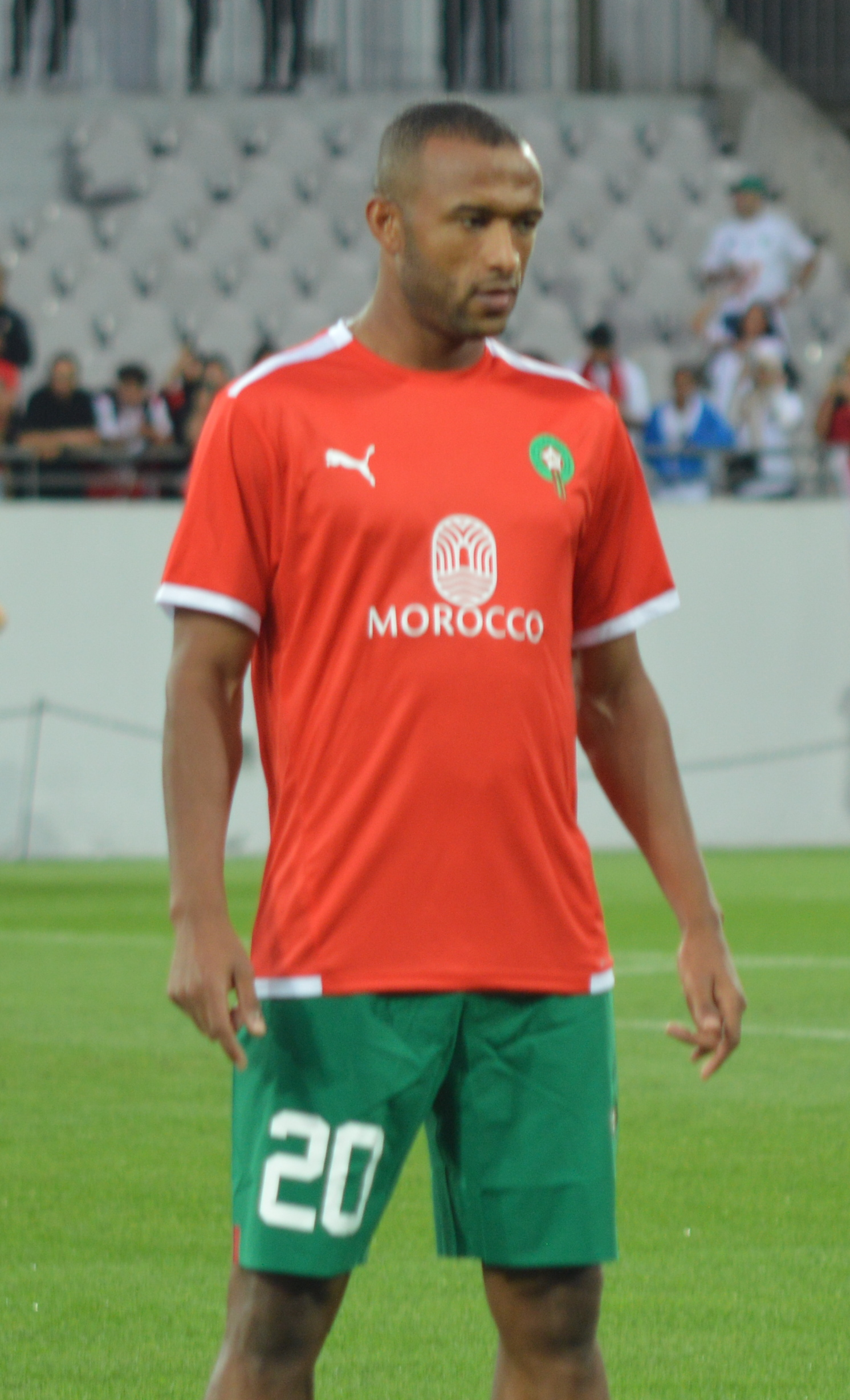
Ayoub El Kaabi, top scorer of the 2023–24 UEFA Europa Conference League with 11 goals, scored the crucial goal in the 116th minute of the extra time in the Final.

In the semi-final, Thrylos' had to face Aston Villa, whom at the time were 4th in the Premier League and were in one of their best seasons under Unai Emery. Despite entering the tie as massive underdogs, Olympiacos crushed the Villans with a 6–2 aggregate score, winning both legs and having El Kaabi scoring 5 goals, tying a record held by Cristiano Ronaldo and Radamel Falcao. This marked the first time a Greek Club entered the final of a European competition since 1971. Their final opponent, was Italian powerhouse ACF Fiorentina, who themselves appeared in the last year's final, losing 1–2 to West Ham in the last minute of the match.

The final was held in rival's AEK Agia Sophia Stadium on the 29th of May, the same day Constantinople fell 571 years prior. Pressure was immense going into the game, with thousands of fans coming to support the team in the stadium and hundreds of thousands of others watching the game in the streets of Piraeus. A close game, poor in chances and with a lot of tension ended in a 0–0 draw after 90 minutes. With everything looking like the tie would be settled on penalties, a 116th minute cross by Santiago Hezze landed on El Kaabi's head, who put the ball in Terracciano's net to make it 1–0, causing delirium among millions of Olympiacos fans all over the world. After a VAR check by Artur Soares Dias, the goal was confirmed and the game ended in that score, with Olympiacos making history and becoming the only Greek football club to win a UEFA competition. This has been described by many as the greatest achievement in the history of Greek Football, since the Greek national team's Euro 2004 victory. The club's achievement is highlighted by the fact that their odds of winning the competition after their 1–4 home loss to Maccabi in the Round of 16, were at just 0.1%.

== UEFA competition record ==
Olympiacos' record in UEFA competitions.

As of 4 November 2026

Competition	Total							Home					Away				
	Pld	W	D	L	GF	GA	GD	W	D	L	GF	GA	W	D	L	GF	GA
UEFA Champions League	198	69	40	89	233	301	–68	52	23	24	151	108	17	17	65	82	193
European Cup (up to 1991–92)	28	7	6	15	25	43	–18	7	4	3	20	14	0	2	12	5	29
Champions League (since 1992–93)	162	60	33	69	204	248	–44	43	19	19	128	91	17	14	50	76	157
Qualifying rounds	30	18	8	4	49	24	+25	10	4	1	27	9	8	4	3	22	15
Main tournament	132	42	25	65	155	224	–69	33	15	18	101	82	9	10	47	54	142
UEFA Europa League	142	61	28	53	201	181	+20	39	15	18	131	81	22	14	35	70	100
UEFA Cup (up to 2008–09)	52	24	7	21	77	75	+2	17	4	5	53	28	7	3	16	24	47
Europa League (since 2009–10)	90	37	22	32	124	106	+18	22	11	13	77	53	15	11	19	46	53
UEFA Cup Winners' Cup	33	14	6	13	43	47	–4	6	6	4	24	17	8	0	9	19	30
UEFA Europa Conference League	9	7	0	2	19	10	+9	3	0	1	7	6	3	0	1	11	4
Total	382	151	74	157	496	539	–43	100	44	47	313	212	50	31	110	182	327

== International record ==
Season	Achievement	Notes
Under-20 Intercontinental Cup
2024	Runners-up	against Flamengo 1–2 in the final of Maracanã

== Honours ==
- UEFA Europa Conference League
  - Winners (1): 2023–24
- UEFA Youth League
  - Winners (1): 2023–24
- Under-20 Intercontinental Cup
  - Runner's up (1): 2024

== UEFA club ranking ==
=== Five-year points ===
5-year club ranking at the end of season 2025–26

Rank	Club	Points gained in season					Total
Rank	Club	2021–22	2022–23	2023–24	2024–25	2025–26	Total
34	(Italy) Napoli	9.000	25.000	17.000	–	12.000	63.000
35	(Netherlands) AZ Alkmaar	13.000	19.000	4.000	12.500	14.375	62.875
36	(Greece) Olympiacos	8.000	3.000	17.000	18.500	15.750	62.250
37	(Germany) RB Leipzig	17.000	18.000	18.000	8.000	–	61.000
38	(Scotland) Rangers	19.000	4.000	14.000	19.250	3.000	59.250

=== Ten-year points ===
10-year club ranking at the end of season 2025–26

Rank	Club	Points gained in season										Total
Rank	Club	2016–17	2017–18	2018–19	2019–20	2020–21	2021–22	2022–23	2023–24	2024–25	2025–26	Total
28	(Germany) Eintracht Frankfurt	–	–	24.000	9.000	–	28.000	16.000	7.000	23.000	9.000	116.000
29	(Belgium) Club Brugge	4.000	1.500	11.000	8.000	11.000	7.000	17.000	21.000	15.750	14.500	110.750
30	(Greece) Olympiacos	10.000	5.000	8.000	10.000	10.000	8.000	3.000	17.000	18.500	15.750	105.250
31	(Austria) Red Bull Salzburg	5.000	21.000	16.000	10.000	7.000	17.000	9.000	7.000	8.000	4.000	104.000
32	(Italy) Lazio	–	17.000	6.000	4.000	17.000	9.000	6.000	18.000	26.000	–	103.000

== Top scorers in UEFA competitions ==
Player	Country	Goals	Apps	Ratio	Years
Ayoub El Kaabi	Morocco	26	39	0.67	2023–
Youssef El-Arabi	Morocco	20	58	0.34	2019–2024
Kostas Mitroglou	Greece	15	44	0.34	2007–2015
Predrag Đorđević	Serbia	15	83	0.18	1996–2009
Nikos Anastopoulos	Greece	14	29	0.48	1980–1987; 1989–1992; 1993–1994
Kostas Fortounis	Greece	13	78	0.17	2014–2024, 2026–
Stelios Giannakopoulos	Greece	9	40	0.23	1996–2003
Diogo	Brazil	8	17	0.47	2008–2012
Giorgos Sideris	Greece	8	19	0.42	1959–1970
Alexis Alexandris	Greece	8	36	0.22	1994–2003
Giovanni	Brazil	8	38	0.21	1999–2005
Ieroklis Stoltidis	Greece	8	44	0.18	2003–2010
Georgios Masouras	Greece	8	73	0.11	2019–2025

== Best seasons in Europe ==
=== Best campaigns ===
Season	Achievement	Notes
European Cup / UEFA Champions League
1974–75	Round of 16	eliminated by Anderlecht 1–5 in Brussels, 3–0 in Patras
1982–83	Round of 16	eliminated by Hamburger SV 0–1 in Hamburg, 0–4 in Athens
1983–84	Round of 16	eliminated by Benfica 1–0 in Athens, 0–3 in Lisbon
1998–99	Quarter-finals	eliminated by Juventus 1–2 in Turin, 1–1 in Athens
2007–08	Round of 16	eliminated by Chelsea 0–0 in Piraeus, 0–3 in London
2009–10	Round of 16	eliminated by Bordeaux 0–1 in Piraeus, 1–2 in Bordeaux
2013–14	Round of 16	eliminated by Manchester United 2–0 in Piraeus, 0–3 in Manchester
European Cup Winners' Cup
1961–62	Round of 16	eliminated by Dynamo Žilina 2–3 in Piraeus, 0–1 in Žilina
1963–64	Round of 16	eliminated by Lyon 1–4 in Lyon, 2–1 in Piraeus
1965–66	Round of 16	eliminated by West Ham United 0–4 in London, 2–2 in Piraeus
1968–69	Round of 16	eliminated by Dunfermline Athletic 0–4 in Dunfermline, 3–0 in Piraeus
1986–87	Round of 16	eliminated by Ajax 0–4 in Amsterdam, 1–1 in Athens
1990–91	Round of 16	eliminated by Sampdoria 0–1 in Piraeus, 1–3 in Genoa
1992–93	Quarter-finals	eliminated by Atlético Madrid 1–1 in Athens, 1–3 in Madrid
UEFA Cup / UEFA Europa League
1989–90	Round of 16	eliminated by Auxerre 1–1 in Piraeus, 0–0 in Auxerre
2004–05	Round of 16	eliminated by Newcastle United 1–3 in Piraeus, 0–4 in Newcastle
2011–12	Round of 16	eliminated by Metalist Kharkiv 1–0 in Kharkiv, 1–2 in Piraeus
2016–17	Round of 16	eliminated by Beşiktaş 1–1 in Piraeus, 1–4 in Istanbul
2019–20	Round of 16	eliminated by Wolverhampton Wanderers 1–1 in Piraeus, 0–1 in Wolverhampton
2020–21	Round of 16	eliminated by Arsenal 1–3 in Piraeus, 1–0 in London
2024–25	Round of 16	eliminated by FK Bodø/Glimt 0–3 in Bodø, 2–1 in Piraeus
UEFA Europa Conference League
2023–24	Winners	defeated Fiorentina 1–0 in the final of Athens
UEFA Youth League
2023–24	Winners	defeated AC Milan 3–0 in the final of Nyon
2024–25	Quarter-finals	eliminated by Red Bull Salzburg 0–1 in Salzburg
Balkans Cup
1961–63	Winners	defeated Levski Sofia 1–0 in Piraeus, 0–1 in Sofia, 1–0 in Istanbul
Under-20 Intercontinental Cup
2024	Runners-up	against Flamengo 1–2 in the final of Maracanã

== Match table ==
All results (home, away and neutral) list Olympiacos' goal tally in bold.

Colour key

Wins / Advances to the next round
Competition / Cup Winners

Key

- a.e.t. = After extra time
- p = Penalty shoot-out
- H = Home match
- A = Away match
- N = Neutral venue

Season	Competition	Round	Country	Opponent	Score
1958–59	European Cup	Preliminary Round	Turkey	Beşiktaş	Olympiacos withdrew
1959–60	European Cup	Preliminary Round	Italy	Milan	**2**–2 (H), 3–**1** (A)
1961–62	European Cup Winners' Cup	First Round	Czechoslovakia	Dynamo Žilina	**2**–3 (H), 1–**0** (A)
1962–63	European Cup Winners' Cup	Preliminary Round	Malta	Hibernians	Olympiacos withdrew
1961–63	Balkans Cup	Group Stage	Romania	Steagul Roșu Brașov	**1**–0 (H), 6–**2** (A)
1961–63	Balkans Cup	Group Stage	Yugoslavia	Sarajevo	**3**–2 (H), 3–**3** (A)
1961–63	Balkans Cup	Group Stage	Turkey	Galatasaray	**1**–0 (H), 1–**1** (A)
1961–63	Balkans Cup	Final	Bulgaria	Levski Sofia	**1**–0 (H), 1–**0** (A), **1**–0 (N)
1963–64	European Cup Winners' Cup	First Round	Poland	Zagłębie Sosnowiec	**2**–1 (H), 1–**0** (A), **2**–0 (N)
1963–64	European Cup Winners' Cup	Second Round	France	Lyon	4–**1** (A), **2**–1 (H)
1965–66	European Cup Winners' Cup	First Round	Cyprus	Omonia	0–**1** (A), **1**–1 (H)
1965–66	European Cup Winners' Cup	Second Round	England	West Ham United	4–**0** (A), **2**–2 (H)
1966–67	European Cup	First Round	Bulgaria	CSKA Sofia	3–**1** (A), **1**–0 (H)
1967–68	European Cup	First Round	Italy	Juventus	**0**–0 (H), 2–**0** (A)
1968–69	European Cup Winners' Cup	First Round	Iceland	KR	**2**–0 (H), 0–**2** (A)
1968–69	European Cup Winners' Cup	Second Round	Scotland	Dunfermline Athletic	4–**0** (A), **3**–0 (H)
1969–70	European Cup Winners' Cup	First Round	Poland	Górnik Zabrze	**2**–2 (H), 5–**0** (A)
1971–72	European Cup Winners' Cup	First Round	Soviet Union	Dynamo Moscow	**0**–2 (H), 1–**2** (A)
1972–73	UEFA Cup	First Round	Italy	Cagliari	**2**–1 (H), 0–**1** (A)
1972–73	UEFA Cup	Second Round	England	Tottenham Hotspur	4–**0** (A), **1**–0 (H)
1973–74	European Cup	First Round	Portugal	Benfica	1–**0** (A), **0**–1 (H)
1974–75	European Cup	First Round	Scotland	Celtic	1–**1** (A), **2**–0 (H)
1974–75	European Cup	Second Round	Belgium	Anderlecht	5–**1** (A), **3**–0 (H)
1975–76	European Cup	First Round	Soviet Union	Dynamo Kyiv	**2**–2 (H), 1–**0** (A)
1976–77	UEFA Cup	First Round	Romania	Sportul Studențesc București	3–**0** (A), **2**–1 (H)
1977–78	UEFA Cup	First Round	Yugoslavia	Dinamo Zagreb	**3**–1 (H), 5–**1** (A)
1978–79	UEFA Cup	First Round	Bulgaria	Levski Sofia	**2**–1 (H), 3–**1** (A)
1979–80	UEFA Cup	First Round	Italy	Napoli	2–**0** (A), **1**–0 (H)
1980–81	European Cup	First Round	West Germany	Bayern Munich	**2**–4 (H), 3–**0** (A)
1981–82	European Cup	First Round	Romania	Universitatea Craiova	3–**0** (A), **2**–0 (H)
1982–83	European Cup	First Round	Sweden	Öster	**2**–0 (H), 1–**0** (A)
1982–83	European Cup	Second Round	West Germany	Hamburger SV	1–**0** (A), **0**–4 (H)
1983–84	European Cup	First Round	Netherlands	Ajax	0–**0** (A), **2**–0 (H)
1983–84	European Cup	Second Round	Portugal	Benfica	**1**–0 (H), 3–**0** (A)
1984–85	UEFA Cup	First Round	Switzerland	Neuchâtel Xamax	**1**–0 (H), 2–**2** (A)
1984–85	UEFA Cup	Second Round	Romania	Universitatea Craiova	1–**0** (A), **0**–1 (H)
1986–87	European Cup Winners' Cup	First Round	Luxembourg	Union Luxembourg	**3**–0 (H), 0–**3** (A)
1986–87	European Cup Winners' Cup	Second Round	Netherlands	Ajax	4–**0** (A), **1**–1 (H)
1987–88	European Cup	First Round	Poland	Górnik Zabrze	**1**–1 (H), 2–**1** (A)
1989–90	UEFA Cup	First Round	Yugoslavia	Rad	2–**1** (A), **2**–0 (H)
1989–90	UEFA Cup	Second Round	Austria	First Vienna	2–**2** (A), **1**–1 (H)
1989–90	UEFA Cup	Third Round	France	Auxerre	**1**–1 (H), 0–**0** (A)
1990–91	European Cup Winners' Cup	First Round	Albania	Flamurtari Vlorë	**3**–1 (H), 0–**2** (A)
1990–91	European Cup Winners' Cup	Second Round	Italy	Sampdoria	**0**–1 (H), 3–**1** (A)
1992–93	European Cup Winners' Cup	First Round	Ukraine	Chornomorets Odesa	**0**–1 (H), 0–**3** (A)
1992–93	European Cup Winners' Cup	Second	France	Monaco	0–**1** (A), **0**–0 (H)
1992–93	European Cup Winners' Cup	Quarter-final	Spain	Atlético Madrid	**1**–1 (H), 3–**1** (A)
1993–94	UEFA Cup	First Round	Bulgaria	Botev Plovdiv	2–**3** (A), **5**–1 (H)
1993–94	UEFA Cup	Second Round	Spain	Tenerife	2–**1** (A), **4**–3 (H)
1994–95	UEFA Cup	First Round	France	Marseille	**1**–2 (H), 3–**0** (A)
1995–96	UEFA Cup	Preliminary Round	Bulgaria	Slavia Sofia	0–**2** (A), **1**–0 (H)
1995–96	UEFA Cup	First Round	Slovenia	Maribor	**2**–0 (H), 1–**3** (A)
1995–96	UEFA Cup	Second Round	Spain	Sevilla	1–**0** (A), **2**–1 (H)
1996–97	UEFA Cup	First Round	Hungary	Ferencváros	3–**1** (A), **2**–2 (H)
1997–98	UEFA Champions League	Second qualifying	Belarus	MPKC Mozyr	**5**–0 (H), 2–**2** (A)
1997–98	UEFA Champions League	Group stage	Portugal	Porto	**1**–0 (H), 2–**1** (A)
1997–98	UEFA Champions League	Group stage	Norway	Rosenborg	**2**–2 (H), 5–**1** (A)
1997–98	UEFA Champions League	Group stage	Spain	Real Madrid	**0**–0 (H), 5–**1** (A)
1998–99	UEFA Champions League	Second qualifying	Cyprus	Anorthosis Famagusta	**2**–1 (H), 2–**4** (A)
1998–99	UEFA Champions League	Group stage	Portugal	Porto	**2**–1 (H), 2–**2** (A)
1998–99	UEFA Champions League	Group stage	Croatia	Croatia Zagreb	**2**–0 (H), 1–**1** (A)
1998–99	UEFA Champions League	Group stage	Netherlands	Ajax	**1**–0 (H), 2–**0** (A)
1998–99	UEFA Champions League	Quarter-final	Italy	Juventus	2–**1** (A), **1**–1 (H)
1999–2000	UEFA Champions League	First group stage	Spain	Real Madrid	**3**–3 (H), 3–**0** (A)
1999–2000	UEFA Champions League	First group stage	Portugal	Porto	**1**–0 (H), 2–**0** (A)
1999–2000	UEFA Champions League	First group stage	Norway	Molde	**3**–1 (H), 3–**2** (A)
1999–2000	UEFA Cup	Third Round	Italy	Juventus	**1**–3 (H), 1–**2** (A)
2000–01	UEFA Champions League	First group stage	Spain	Valencia	**1**–0 (H), 2–**1** (A)
2000–01	UEFA Champions League	First group stage	France	Lyon	**2**–1 (H), 1–**0** (A)
2000–01	UEFA Champions League	First group stage	Netherlands	Heerenveen	**2**–0 (H), 1–**0** (A)
2000–01	UEFA Cup	Third Round	England	Liverpool	**2**–2 (H), 2–**0** (A)
2001–02	UEFA Champions League	First group stage	Spain	Deportivo La Coruña	**1**–1 (H), 2–**2** (A)
2001–02	UEFA Champions League	First group stage	France	Lille	**2**–1 (H), 3–**1** (A)
2001–02	UEFA Champions League	First group stage	England	Manchester United	**0**–2 (H), 3–**0** (A)
2002–03	UEFA Champions League	Group stage	Germany	Bayer Leverkusen	**6**–2 (H), 2–**0** (A)
2002–03	UEFA Champions League	Group stage	Israel	Maccabi Haifa	**3**–3 (H), 3–**0** (A)
2002–03	UEFA Champions League	Group stage	England	Manchester United	**2**–3 (H), 4–**0** (A)
2003–04	UEFA Champions League	Group stage	Spain	Real Sociedad	**2**–2 (H), 1–**0** (A)
2003–04	UEFA Champions League	Group stage	Italy	Juventus	**1**–2 (H), 7–**0** (A)
2003–04	UEFA Champions League	Group stage	Turkey	Galatasaray	**3**–0 (H), 1–**0** (A)
2004–05	UEFA Champions League	Group stage	Spain	Deportivo La Coruña	**1**–0 (H), 0–**0** (A)
2004–05	UEFA Champions League	Group stage	England	Liverpool	**1**–0 (H), 3–**1** (A)
2004–05	UEFA Champions League	Group stage	France	Monaco	**1**–0 (H), 2–**1** (A)
2004–05	UEFA Cup	Round of 32	France	Sochaux	**1**–0 (H), 0–**1** (A)
2004–05	UEFA Cup	Round of 16	England	Newcastle United	**1**–3 (H), 4–**0** (A)
2005–06	UEFA Champions League	Group stage	Norway	Rosenborg	**1**–3 (H), 1–**1** (A)
2005–06	UEFA Champions League	Group stage	Spain	Real Madrid	**2**–1 (H), 2–**1** (A)
2005–06	UEFA Champions League	Group stage	France	Lyon	**1**–4 (H), 2–**1** (A)
2006–07	UEFA Champions League	Group stage	Spain	Valencia	**2**–4 (H), 2–**0** (A)
2006–07	UEFA Champions League	Group stage	Ukraine	Shakhtar Donetsk	**1**–1 (H), 2–**2** (A)
2006–07	UEFA Champions League	Group stage	Italy	Roma	**0**–1 (H), 1–**1** (A)
2007–08	UEFA Champions League	Group stage	Italy	Lazio	**1**–1 (H), 1–**2** (A)
2007–08	UEFA Champions League	Group stage	Germany	Werder Bremen	**3**–0 (H), 1–**3** (A)
2007–08	UEFA Champions League	Group stage	Spain	Real Madrid	**0**–0 (H), 4–**2** (A)
2007–08	UEFA Champions League	Round of 16	England	Chelsea	**0**–0 (H), 3–**0** (A)
2008–09	UEFA Champions League	Third qualifying	Cyprus	Anorthosis Famagusta	3–**0** (A), **1**–0 (H)
2008–09	UEFA Cup	First Round	Denmark	Nordsjælland	0–**2** (A), **5**–0 (H)
2008–09	UEFA Cup	Group stage	Turkey	Galatasaray	1–**0** (A)
2008–09	UEFA Cup	Group stage	Portugal	Benfica	**5**–1 (H)
2008–09	UEFA Cup	Group stage	Ukraine	Metalist Kharkiv	1–**0** (A)
2008–09	UEFA Cup	Group stage	Germany	Hertha BSC	**4**–0 (H)
2008–09	UEFA Cup	Round of 32	France	Saint-Étienne	**1**–3 (H), 2–**1** (A)
2009–10	UEFA Champions League	Third qualifying	Slovakia	Slovan Bratislava	0–**2** (A), **2**–0 (H)
2009–10	UEFA Champions League	Play-off	Moldova	Sheriff Tiraspol	0–**2** (A), **1**–0 (H)
2009–10	UEFA Champions League	Group stage	Netherlands	AZ	**1**–0 (H), 0–**0** (A)
2009–10	UEFA Champions League	Group stage	England	Arsenal	**1**–0 (H), 2–**0** (A)
2009–10	UEFA Champions League	Group stage	Belgium	Standard Liège	**2**–1 (H), 2–**0** (A)
2009–10	UEFA Champions League	Round of 16	France	Bordeaux	**0**–1 (H), 2–**1** (A)
2010–11	UEFA Europa League	Second qualifying	Albania	Besa	0–**5** (A), **6**–1 (H)
2010–11	UEFA Europa League	Third qualifying	Israel	Maccabi Tel Aviv	**2**–1 (H), 1–**0** (A)
2011–12	UEFA Champions League	Group Stage	France	Marseille	**0**–1 (H), 0–**1** (A)
2011–12	UEFA Champions League	Group Stage	England	Arsenal	**3**–1 (H), 2–**1** (A)
2011–12	UEFA Champions League	Group Stage	Germany	Borussia Dortmund	**3**–1 (H), 1–**0** (A)
2011–12	UEFA Europa League	Round of 32	Russia	Rubin Kazan	0–**1** (A), **1**–0 (H)
2011–12	UEFA Europa League	Round of 16	Ukraine	Metalist Kharkiv	0–**1** (A), **1**–2 (H)
2012–13	UEFA Champions League	Group Stage	Germany	Schalke 04	**1**–2 (H), 1–**0** (A)
2012–13	UEFA Champions League	Group Stage	England	Arsenal	**2**–1 (H), 3–**1** (A)
2012–13	UEFA Champions League	Group Stage	France	Montpellier	**3**–1 (H), 1–**2** (A)
2012–13	UEFA Europa League	Round of 32	Spain	Levante	3–**0** (A), **0**–1 (H)
2013–14	UEFA Champions League	Group Stage	France	Paris Saint-Germain	**1**–4 (H), 2–**1** (A)
2013–14	UEFA Champions League	Group Stage	Belgium	Anderlecht	**3**–1 (H), 0–**3** (A)
2013–14	UEFA Champions League	Group Stage	Portugal	Benfica	**1**–0 (H), 1–**1** (A)
2013–14	UEFA Champions League	Round of 16	England	Manchester United	**2**–0 (H), 3–**0** (A)
2014–15	UEFA Champions League	Group Stage	Spain	Atlético Madrid	**3**–2 (H), 4–**0** (A)
2014–15	UEFA Champions League	Group Stage	Italy	Juventus	**1**–0 (H), 3–**2** (A)
2014–15	UEFA Champions League	Group Stage	Sweden	Malmö FF	**4**–2 (H), 2–**0** (A)
2014–15	UEFA Europa League	Round of 32	Ukraine	Dnipro Dnipropetrovsk	2–**0** (A), **2**–2 (H)
2015–16	UEFA Champions League	Group Stage	Germany	Bayern Munich	**0**–3 (H), 4–**0** (A)
2015–16	UEFA Champions League	Group Stage	England	Arsenal	**0**–3 (H), 2–**3** (A)
2015–16	UEFA Champions League	Group Stage	Croatia	Dinamo Zagreb	**2**–1 (H), 0–**1** (A)
2015–16	UEFA Europa League	Round of 32	Belgium	Anderlecht	1–**0** (A), **1**–2 (H)
2016–17	UEFA Champions League	Third qualifying	Israel	Hapoel Be'er Sheva	**0**–0 (H), 1–**0** (A)
2016–17	UEFA Europa League	Play-off	Portugal	Arouca	0–**1** (A), **2**–1 (H)
2016–17	UEFA Europa League	Group stage	Switzerland	Young Boys	**1**–1 (H), 0–**1** (A)
2016–17	UEFA Europa League	Group stage	Cyprus	APOEL	**0**–1 (H), 2–**0** (A)
2016–17	UEFA Europa League	Group stage	Kazakhstan	Astana	**4**–1 (H), 1–**1** (A)
2016–17	UEFA Europa League	Round of 32	Turkey	Osmanlıspor	**0**–0 (H), 0–**3** (A)
2016–17	UEFA Europa League	Round of 16	Turkey	Beşiktaş	**1**–1 (H), 4–**1** (A)
2017–18	UEFA Champions League	Third qualifying	Serbia	Partizan	1–**3** (A), **2**–2 (H)
2017–18	UEFA Champions League	Play-off	Croatia	Rijeka	**2**–1 (H), 0–**1** (A)
2017–18	UEFA Champions League	Group Stage	Portugal	Sporting CP	**2**–3 (H), 3–**1** (A)
2017–18	UEFA Champions League	Group Stage	Italy	Juventus	2–**0** (A), **0**–2 (H)
2017–18	UEFA Champions League	Group Stage	Spain	Barcelona	3–**1** (A), **0**–0 (H)
2018–19	UEFA Europa League	Third qualifying	Switzerland	Luzern	**4**–0 (H), 1–**3** (A)
2018–19	UEFA Europa League	Play-off	England	Burnley	**3**–1 (H), 1–**1** (A)
2018–19	UEFA Europa League	Group Stage	Luxembourg	F91 Dudelange	0–**2** (A), **5**–1 (H)
2018–19	UEFA Europa League	Group Stage	Italy	Milan	3–**1** (A), **3**–1 (H)
2018–19	UEFA Europa League	Group Stage	Spain	Real Betis	**0**–0 (H), 1–**0** (A)
2018–19	UEFA Europa League	Round of 32	Ukraine	Dynamo Kyiv	**2**–2 (H), 1–**0** (A)
2019–20	UEFA Champions League	Second qualifying	Czech Republic	Viktoria Plzeň	0–**0** (A), **4**–0 (H)
2019–20	UEFA Champions League	Third qualifying	Turkey	İstanbul Başakşehir	0–**1** (A), **2**–0 (H)
2019–20	UEFA Champions League	Play-off	Russia	Krasnodar	**4**–0 (H), 1–**2** (A)
2019–20	UEFA Champions League	Group Stage	Germany	Bayern Munich	**2**–3 (H), 2–**0** (A)
2019–20	UEFA Champions League	Group Stage	England	Tottenham Hotspur	**2**–2 (H), 4–**2** (A)
2019–20	UEFA Champions League	Group Stage	Serbia	Red Star Belgrade	3–**1** (A), **1**–0 (H)
2019–20	UEFA Europa League	Round of 32	England	Arsenal	**0**–1 (H), 1–**2** (A)
2019–20	UEFA Europa League	Round of 16	England	Wolverhampton Wanderers	**1**–1 (H), 1–**0** (A)
2020–21	UEFA Champions League	Play-off	Cyprus	Omonia	**2**–0 (H), 0–**0** (A)
2020–21	UEFA Champions League	Group Stage	Portugal	Porto	2–**0** (A), **0**–2 (H)
2020–21	UEFA Champions League	Group Stage	England	Manchester City	3–**0** (A), **0**–1 (H)
2020–21	UEFA Champions League	Group Stage	France	Marseille	**1**–0 (H), 2–**1** (A)
2020–21	UEFA Europa League	Round of 32	Netherlands	PSV Eindhoven	**4**–2 (H), 2–**1** (A)
2020–21	UEFA Europa League	Round of 16	England	Arsenal	**1**–3 (H), 0–**1** (A)
2021–22	UEFA Champions League	Second qualifying	Azerbaijan	Neftçi Baku	**1**–0 (H), 0–**1** (A)
2021–22	UEFA Champions League	Third qualifying	Bulgaria	Ludogorets Razgrad	**1**–1 (H), 2–**2** (4–**1** p) (A)
2021–22	UEFA Europa League	Play-off	Slovakia	Slovan Bratislava	**3**–0 (H), 2–**2** (A)
2021–22	UEFA Europa League	Group Stage	Germany	Eintracht Frankfurt	3–**1** (A), **1**–2 (H)
2021–22	UEFA Europa League	Group Stage	Turkey	Fenerbahçe	0–**3** (A), **1**–0 (H)
2021–22	UEFA Europa League	Group Stage	Belgium	Antwerp	**2**–1 (H), 1–**0** (A)
2021–22	UEFA Europa League	Knockout round play-offs	Italy	Atalanta	2–**1** (A), **0**–3 (H)
2022–23	UEFA Champions League	Second qualifying	Israel	Maccabi Haifa	1–**1** (A), **0**−4 (H)
2022–23	UEFA Europa League	Third qualifying	Slovakia	Slovan Bratislava	**1**−1 (H), 2–**2** (3–**4** p) (A)
2022–23	UEFA Europa League	Play-off	Cyprus	Apollon Limassol	1–**1** (A), **1**–1 (**3**–1 p) (H)
2022–23	UEFA Europa League	Group Stage	Azerbaijan	Qarabağ	**0**−3 (H), 0–**0** (A)
2022–23	UEFA Europa League	Group Stage	Germany	SC Freiburg	**0**−3 (H), 1–**1** (A)
2022–23	UEFA Europa League	Group Stage	France	Nantes	2–**1** (A), **0**−2 (H)
2023–24	UEFA Europa League	Third qualifying	Belgium	Genk	**1**–0 (H), 1–**1** (A)
2023–24	UEFA Europa League	Play-off	Serbia	Čukarički	**3**–1 (H), 0–**3** (A)
2023–24	UEFA Europa League	Group Stage	Germany	SC Freiburg	**2**–3 (H), 5–**0** (A)
2023–24	UEFA Europa League	Group Stage	England	West Ham United	**2**–1 (H), 1–**0** (A)
2023–24	UEFA Europa League	Group Stage	Serbia	TSC	2–**2** (A), **5**–2 (H)
2023–24	UEFA Europa Conference League	Knockout round play-offs	Hungary	Ferencváros	**1**–0 (H), 0–**1** (A)
2023–24	UEFA Europa Conference League	Round of 16	Israel	Maccabi Tel Aviv	**1**–4 (H), 1–**6** (A)
2023–24	UEFA Europa Conference League	Quarter-final	Turkey	Fenerbahçe	**3**–2 (H), 1–**0** (2–**3** p) (A)
2023–24	UEFA Europa Conference League	Semi-final	England	Aston Villa	2–**4** (A), **2**–0 (H)
2023–24	UEFA Europa Conference League	Final	Italy	Fiorentina	**1**–0 (a.e.t.)
2024–25	UEFA Europa League	League Phase (7th place)	France	Lyon	2–**0** (A)
2024–25	UEFA Europa League	League Phase (7th place)	Portugal	Braga	**3**–0 (H)
2024–25	UEFA Europa League	League Phase (7th place)	Sweden	Malmö	0–**1** (A)
2024–25	UEFA Europa League	League Phase (7th place)	Scotland	Rangers	**1**–1 (H)
2024–25	UEFA Europa League	League Phase (7th place)	Romania	FCSB	0–**0** (A)
2024–25	UEFA Europa League	League Phase (7th place)	Netherlands	Twente	**0**–0 (H)
2024–25	UEFA Europa League	League Phase (7th place)	Portugal	Porto	0–**1** (A)
2024–25	UEFA Europa League	League Phase (7th place)	Azerbaijan	Qarabağ	**3**–0 (H)
2024–25	UEFA Europa League	Round of 16	Norway	Bodø/Glimt	3–**0** (A), **2**–1 (H)
2025–26	UEFA Champions League	League Phase	Cyprus	Pafos	**0**–0 (H)
2025–26	UEFA Champions League	League Phase	England	Arsenal	2–**0** (A)
2025–26	UEFA Champions League	League Phase	Spain	Barcelona	6–**1** (A)
2025–26	UEFA Champions League	League Phase	Netherlands	PSV Eindhoven	**1**–1 (H)
2025–26	UEFA Champions League	League Phase	Spain	Real Madrid	**3**–4 (H)
2025–26	UEFA Champions League	League Phase	Kazakhstan	Kairat	0–**1** (A)
2025–26	UEFA Champions League	League Phase	Germany	Bayer Leverkusen	**2**–0 (H)
2025–26	UEFA Champions League	League Phase	Netherlands	Ajax	1–**2** (A)
2025–26	UEFA Champions League	Knockout phase play-offs	Germany	Bayer Leverkusen	**0**–2 (H), 0–**0** (A)
2026–27	UEFA Champions League	Third qualifying	Netherlands	NEC Nijmegen	**0**−0 (H), 2–**1** (A)
2026–27	UEFA Europa League	League Phase	Poland	Jagiellonia Białystok	**2**−1 (H)
2026–27	UEFA Europa League	League Phase	France	Marseille	0–**1** (A)
2026–27	UEFA Europa League	League Phase	Czech Republic	Sparta Prague	**1**−0 (H)
2026–27	UEFA Europa League	League Phase	France	Rennes	0–**0** (A)
2026–27	UEFA Europa League	League Phase	Italy	Milan	
2026–27	UEFA Europa League	League Phase	Slovenia	Celje	
2026–27	UEFA Europa League	League Phase	Germany	TSG Hoffenheim	
2026–27	UEFA Europa League	League Phase	Portugal	Torreense	

Biggest wins
Season	Match	Score
European Cup / UEFA Champions League
1974–75	**Olympiacos** – Anderlecht	**3–0**
1997–98	**Olympiacos** – MPKC Mozyr	**5–0** ^{[a]}
2002–03	**Olympiacos** – Bayer Leverkusen	**6–2**
2003–04	**Olympiacos** – Galatasaray	**3–0**
2007–08	Werder Bremen – **Olympiacos**	**1–3**
2007–08	**Olympiacos** – Werder Bremen	**3–0**
2011–12	**Olympiacos** – Borussia Dortmund	**3–1**
2013–14	Anderlecht – **Olympiacos**	**0–3**
2013–14	**Olympiacos** – Anderlecht	**3–1**
2014–15	**Olympiacos** – Malmö FF	**4–2**
2019–20	**Olympiacos** – Viktoria Plzeň	**4–0**
2019–20	**Olympiacos** – Krasnodar	**4–0**
European Cup Winners' Cup
1968–69	**Olympiacos** – Dunfermline Athletic	**3–0**
1986–87	**Olympiacos** – Union Luxembourg	**3–0**
1986–87	Union Luxembourg – **Olympiacos**	**0–3**
1992–93	Chornomorets Odesa – **Olympiacos**	**0–3**
UEFA Cup / Europa League
1993–94	**Olympiacos** – Botev Plovdiv	**5–1**
2008–09	**Olympiacos** – Nordsjælland	**5–0**
2008–09	**Olympiacos** – Benfica	**5–1**
2008–09	**Olympiacos** – Hertha BSC	**4–0**
2010–11	Besa Kavajë – **Olympiacos**	**0–5**
2010–11	**Olympiacos** – Besa Kavajë	**6–1**
2016–17	**Olympiacos** – Astana	**4–1**
2016–17	Osmanlispor – **Olympiacos**	**0–3**
2018–19	**Olympiacos** – Luzern	**4–0**
2018–19	**Olympiacos** – Dudelange	**5–1**
2020–21	**Olympiacos** – PSV Eindhoven	**4–2**
2021–22	Fenerbahçe – **Olympiacos**	**0–3**
UEFA Conference League
2023–24	Maccabi Tel Aviv – **Olympiacos**	**1–6**
2023–24	Aston Villa – **Olympiacos**	**2–4**

Notes

a. In the second qualifying round.

== Record by club ==
Country	Olympiacos vs	Total							Home					Away				
		Pld	W	D	L	GF	GA	GD	W	D	L	GF	GA	W	D	L	GF	GA
Albania	Total	4	4	0	0	16	2	+14	2	0	0	9	2	2	0	0	7	0
Albania	Besa	2	2	0	0	11	1	+10	1	0	0	6	1	1	0	0	5	0
Albania	Flamurtari	2	2	0	0	5	1	+4	1	0	0	3	1	1	0	0	2	0
Austria	Total	2	0	2	0	3	3	-	0	1	0	1	1	0	1	0	2	2
Austria	First Vienna	2	0	2	0	3	3	-	0	1	0	1	1	0	1	0	2	2
Azerbaijan	Total	5	3	1	1	5	3	+2	2	0	1	4	3	1	1	0	1	0
Azerbaijan	Neftçi Baku	2	2	0	0	2	0	+2	1	0	0	1	0	1	0	0	1	0
Azerbaijan	Qarabağ	3	1	1	1	3	3	-	1	0	1	3	3	0	1	0	0	0
Belarus	Total	2	1	1	0	7	2	+5	1	0	0	5	0	0	1	0	2	2
Belarus	MPKC Mozyr	2	1	1	0	7	2	+5	1	0	0	5	0	0	1	0	2	2
Belgium	Total	12	6	1	5	17	15	+2	5	0	1	12	5	1	1	4	5	10
Belgium	Anderlecht	6	3	0	3	11	9	+2	2	0	1	7	3	1	0	2	4	6
Belgium	Genk	2	1	1	0	2	1	+1	1	0	0	1	0	0	1	0	1	1
Belgium	Royal Antwerp	2	1	0	1	2	2	-	1	0	0	2	1	0	0	1	0	1
Belgium	Standard Liège	2	1	0	1	2	3	-1	1	0	0	2	1	0	0	1	0	2
Bulgaria	Total	10	6	2	2	19	13	+6	4	1	0	10	3	2	1	2	9	10
Bulgaria	Botev Plovdiv	2	2	0	0	8	3	+5	1	0	0	5	1	1	0	0	3	2
Bulgaria	CSKA Sofia	2	1	0	1	2	3	-1	1	0	0	1	0	0	0	1	1	3
Bulgaria	Levski Sofia	2	1	0	1	3	4	-1	1	0	0	2	1	0	0	1	1	3
Bulgaria	Ludogorets Razgrad	2	0	2	0	3	3	-	0	1	0	1	1	0	1	0	2	2
Bulgaria	Slavia Sofia	2	2	0	0	3	0	+3	1	0	0	1	0	1	0	0	2	0
Croatia	Total	8	6	1	1	13	9	+4	4	0	0	9	3	2	1	1	4	6
Croatia	Dinamo Zagreb	6	4	1	1	10	8	+2	3	0	0	7	2	1	1	1	3	6
Croatia	Rijeka	2	2	0	0	3	1	+2	1	0	0	2	1	1	0	0	1	0
Cyprus	Total	13	5	5	3	13	12	+1	2	3	1	5	4	2	2	2	6	8
Cyprus	Anorthosis Famagusta	4	3	0	1	7	6	+1	2	0	0	3	1	1	0	1	4	5
Cyprus	APOEL	2	0	0	2	0	3	-3	0	0	1	0	1	0	0	1	0	2
Cyprus	Apollon Limassol	2	0	2	0	2	2	0	0	1	0	1	1	0	1	0	1	1
Cyprus	Omonia	4	2	2	0	4	1	+3	1	1	0	3	1	1	1	0	1	0
Cyprus	Pafos	1	0	1	0	0	0	-	0	1	0	0	0	0	0	0	0	0
Czech Republic	Total	3	2	1	0	5	0	+5	2	0	0	5	0	0	1	0	0	0
Czech Republic	Sparta Prague	1	1	0	0	1	0	+1	1	0	0	1	0	0	0	0	0	0
Czech Republic	Viktoria Plzeň	2	1	1	0	4	0	+4	1	0	0	4	0	0	1	0	0	0
Denmark	Total	2	2	0	0	7	0	+7	1	0	0	5	0	1	0	0	2	0
Denmark	Nordsjælland	2	2	0	0	7	0	+7	1	0	0	5	0	1	0	0	2	0
England	Total	43	13	6	24	44	81	-37	9	5	7	28	27	4	1	17	16	54
England	Arsenal	13	6	0	7	15	21	-6	3	0	3	7	9	3	0	4	8	12
England	Aston Villa	2	2	0	0	6	2	+4	1	0	0	2	0	1	0	0	4	2
England	Burnley	2	1	1	0	4	2	+2	1	0	0	3	1	0	1	0	1	1
England	Chelsea	2	0	1	1	0	3	-3	0	1	0	0	0	0	0	1	0	3
England	Liverpool	4	1	1	2	4	7	-3	1	1	0	3	2	0	0	2	1	5
England	Manchester City	2	0	0	2	0	4	-4	0	0	1	0	1	0	0	1	0	3
England	Manchester United	6	1	0	5	4	15	-11	1	0	2	4	5	0	0	3	0	10
England	Newcastle United	2	0	0	2	1	7	-6	0	0	1	1	3	0	0	1	0	4
England	Tottenham Hotspur	4	1	1	2	5	10	-5	1	1	0	3	2	0	0	2	2	8
England	West Ham United	4	1	1	2	4	8	-4	1	1	0	4	3	0	0	2	0	5
England	Wolverhampton Wanderers	2	0	1	1	1	2	-1	0	1	0	1	1	0	0	1	0	1
France	Total	35	12	4	19	32	50	-18	7	2	7	17	22	5	2	12	15	28
France	Auxerre	2	0	2	0	1	1	-	0	1	0	1	1	0	1	0	0	0
France	Bordeaux	2	0	0	2	1	3	-2	0	0	1	0	1	0	0	1	1	2
France	Lille	2	1	0	1	3	4	-1	1	0	0	2	1	0	0	1	1	3
France	Marseille	7	3	0	4	5	8	-3	1	0	2	2	3	2	0	2	3	5
France	Monaco	4	2	1	1	3	2	+1	1	1	0	1	0	1	0	1	2	2
France	Montpellier	2	2	0	0	5	2	+3	1	0	0	3	1	1	0	0	2	1
France	Nantes	2	0	0	2	1	4	-3	0	0	1	0	2	0	0	1	1	2
France	Lyon	7	2	0	5	7	15	-8	2	0	1	5	6	0	0	4	2	9
France	Paris Saint-Germain	2	0	0	2	2	6	-4	0	0	1	1	4	0	0	1	1	2
France	Rennes	1	0	1	0	0	0	-	0	0	0	0	0	0	1	0	0	0
France	Saint-Étienne	2	0	0	2	2	5	-3	0	0	1	1	3	0	0	1	1	2
France	Sochaux	2	2	0	0	2	0	+2	1	0	0	1	0	1	0	0	1	0
Germany	Total	26	6	2	18	31	52	-21	5	0	8	26	29	1	2	9	5	24
Germany	Bayer Leverkusen	5	2	1	2	8	6	+2	2	0	1	8	4	0	1	1	0	2
Germany	Bayern Munich	6	0	0	6	4	19	-15	0	0	3	4	10	0	0	3	0	9
Germany	Borussia Dortmund	2	1	0	1	3	2	+1	1	0	0	3	1	0	0	1	0	1
Germany	Eintracht Frankfurt	2	0	0	2	2	5	-3	0	0	1	1	2	0	0	1	1	3
Germany	Freiburg	4	0	1	3	3	12	-9	0	0	2	2	6	0	1	1	1	6
Germany	Hamburger SV	2	0	0	2	0	5	-5	0	0	1	0	4	0	0	1	0	1
Germany	Hertha BSC	1	1	0	0	4	0	+4	1	0	0	4	0	0	0	0	0	0
Germany	Schalke 04	2	0	0	2	1	3	-2	0	0	1	1	2	0	0	1	0	1
Germany	Werder Bremen	2	2	0	0	6	1	+5	1	0	0	3	0	1	0	0	3	1
Hungary	Total	4	2	1	1	5	5	-	1	1	0	3	2	1	0	1	2	3
Hungary	Ferencváros	4	2	1	1	5	5	-	1	1	0	3	2	1	0	1	2	3
Iceland	Total	2	2	0	0	4	0	+4	1	0	0	2	0	1	0	0	2	0
Iceland	KR	2	2	0	0	4	0	+4	1	0	0	2	0	1	0	0	2	0
Israel	Total	10	2	3	5	13	19	-6	1	2	2	6	12	1	1	3	7	7
Israel	Hapoel Be'er Sheva	2	0	1	1	0	1	-1	0	1	0	0	0	0	0	1	0	1
Israel	Maccabi Haifa	4	0	2	2	4	11	-7	0	1	1	3	7	0	1	1	1	4
Israel	Maccabi Tel Aviv	4	2	0	2	9	7	+2	1	0	1	3	5	1	0	1	6	2
Italy	Total	29	8	5	16	27	50	-23	4	4	6	13	18	3	1	10	13	32
Italy	Atalanta	2	0	0	2	1	5	-4	0	0	1	0	3	0	0	1	1	2
Italy	Cagliari	2	2	0	0	3	1	+2	1	0	0	2	1	1	0	0	1	0
Italy	Fiorentina	1	1	0	0	1	0	+1	0	0	0	0	0	0	0	0	0	0
Italy	Juventus	12	2	2	8	9	25	-16	1	2	3	4	8	1	0	5	5	17
Italy	Lazio	2	1	1	0	3	2	+1	0	1	0	1	1	1	0	0	2	1
Italy	Milan	4	1	1	2	7	9	-2	1	1	0	5	3	0	0	2	2	6
Italy	Napoli	2	1	0	1	1	2	-1	1	0	0	1	0	0	0	1	0	2
Italy	Roma	2	0	1	1	1	2	-1	0	0	1	0	1	0	1	0	1	1
Italy	Sampdoria	2	0	0	2	1	4	-3	0	0	1	0	1	0	0	1	1	3
Kazakhstan	Total	3	2	1	0	6	2	+4	1	0	0	4	1	1	1	0	2	1
Kazakhstan	Astana	2	1	1	0	5	2	+3	1	0	0	4	1	0	1	0	1	1
Kazakhstan	Kairat	1	1	0	0	1	0	+1	0	0	0	0	0	1	0	0	1	0
Luxembourg	Total	4	4	0	0	13	1	+12	2	0	0	8	1	1	0	0	5	0
Luxembourg	Union Luxembourg	2	2	0	0	6	0	+6	1	0	0	3	0	1	0	0	3	0
Luxembourg	F91 Dudelange	2	2	0	0	7	1	+6	1	0	0	5	1	1	0	0	2	0
Moldova	Total	2	2	0	0	3	0	+3	1	0	0	1	0	1	0	0	2	0
Moldova	Sheriff Tiraspol	2	2	0	0	3	0	+3	1	0	0	1	0	1	0	0	2	0
Netherlands	Total	17	6	6	5	16	16	-	5	4	0	12	4	1	2	5	4	12
Netherlands	Ajax	7	3	2	2	6	8	-2	2	1	0	4	1	1	1	2	2	7
Netherlands	AZ	2	1	1	0	1	0	+1	1	0	0	1	0	0	1	0	0	0
Netherlands	Heerenveen	2	1	0	1	2	1	+1	1	0	0	2	0	0	0	1	0	1
Netherlands	NEC Nijmegen	2	0	1	1	1	2	-	0	1	0	0	0	0	0	1	1	2
Netherlands	PSV Eindhoven	3	1	1	1	6	5	+1	1	1	0	5	3	0	0	1	1	2
Netherlands	Twente	1	0	1	0	0	0	-	0	1	0	0	0	0	0	0	0	0
Norway	Total	8	2	2	4	12	19	-7	2	1	1	8	7	0	1	3	4	12
Norway	Bodø/Glimt	2	1	0	1	2	4	-2	1	0	0	2	1	0	0	1	0	3
Norway	Molde	2	1	0	1	5	4	+1	1	0	0	3	1	0	0	1	2	3
Norway	Rosenborg	4	0	2	2	5	11	-6	0	1	1	3	5	0	1	1	2	6
Poland	Total	8	3	2	3	10	13	-3	2	2	0	7	5	0	0	3	1	8
Poland	Górnik Zabrze	4	0	2	2	4	10	-6	0	2	0	3	3	0	0	2	1	7
Poland	Jagiellonia Białystok	1	1	0	0	2	1	+1	1	0	0	2	1	0	0	0	0	0
Poland	Zagłębie Sosnowiec	3	2	0	1	4	2	+2	1	0	0	2	1	0	0	1	0	1
Portugal	Total	21	10	2	9	25	25	-	8	0	3	18	9	2	2	6	7	16
Portugal	Arouca	2	2	0	0	3	1	+2	1	0	0	2	1	1	0	0	1	0
Portugal	Benfica	7	3	1	3	8	7	+1	3	0	1	7	2	0	1	2	1	5
Portugal	Braga	1	1	0	0	3	0	+3	1	0	0	3	0	0	0	0	0	0
Portugal	Porto	9	4	1	4	8	11	-3	3	0	1	4	3	1	1	3	4	8
Portugal	Sporting CP	2	0	0	2	3	6	-3	0	0	1	2	3	0	0	1	1	3
Romania	Total	7	2	1	4	4	9	-5	2	0	1	4	2	0	1	3	0	7
Romania	FCSB	1	0	1	0	0	0	-	0	0	0	0	0	0	1	0	0	0
Romania	Sportul Studențesc București	2	1	0	1	2	4	-2	1	0	0	2	1	0	0	1	0	3
Romania	Universitatea Craiova	4	1	0	3	2	5	-3	1	0	1	2	1	0	0	2	0	4
Russia Soviet Union	Total	6	5	0	1	10	4	+6	2	0	1	5	2	3	0	0	5	2
Russia Soviet Union	Dynamo Moscow	2	1	0	1	2	3	-1	0	0	1	0	2	1	0	0	2	1
Russia Soviet Union	Krasnodar	2	2	0	0	6	1	+5	1	0	0	4	0	1	0	0	2	1
Russia Soviet Union	Rubin Kazan	2	2	0	0	2	0	+2	1	0	0	1	0	1	0	0	1	0
Scotland	Total	5	2	2	1	7	6	+1	2	1	0	6	1	0	1	1	1	5
Scotland	Celtic	2	1	1	0	3	1	+2	1	0	0	2	0	0	1	0	1	1
Scotland	Dunfermline Athletic	2	1	0	1	3	4	-1	1	0	0	3	0	0	0	1	0	4
Scotland	Rangers	1	0	1	0	1	1	-	0	1	0	1	1	0	0	0	0	0
Serbia Yugoslavia	Total	10	6	2	2	23	13	+10	4	1	0	13	7	2	1	2	10	8
Serbia Yugoslavia	Čukarički	2	2	0	0	6	1	+5	1	0	0	3	1	1	0	0	3	0
Serbia Yugoslavia	Partizan	2	1	1	0	5	3	+2	0	1	0	2	2	1	0	0	3	1
Serbia Yugoslavia	Rad	2	1	0	1	3	2	+1	1	0	0	2	0	0	0	1	1	2
Serbia Yugoslavia	Red Star Belgrade	2	1	0	1	2	3	-1	1	0	0	1	0	0	0	1	1	3
Serbia Yugoslavia	TSC	2	1	1	0	7	4	+3	1	0	0	5	2	0	1	0	2	2
Slovakia	Total	8	3	3	2	14	9	+5	2	1	1	8	4	1	2	1	6	5
Slovakia	Slovan Bratislava	6	3	3	0	12	5	+7	2	1	0	6	1	1	2	0	6	4
Slovakia	Žilina	2	0	0	2	2	4	-2	0	0	1	2	3	0	0	1	0	1
Slovenia	Total	2	2	0	0	5	1	+4	1	0	0	2	0	1	0	0	3	1
Slovenia	Maribor	2	2	0	0	5	1	+4	1	0	0	2	0	1	0	0	3	1
Spain	Total	34	6	10	18	36	67	-31	6	8	3	25	23	0	2	15	11	44
Spain	Atlético Madrid	4	1	1	2	5	10	-5	1	1	0	4	3	0	0	2	1	7
Spain	Barcelona	3	0	1	2	2	9	-7	0	1	0	0	0	0	0	2	2	9
Spain	Deportivo La Coruña	4	1	3	0	4	3	+1	1	1	0	2	1	0	2	0	2	2
Spain	Levante	2	0	0	2	0	4	-4	0	0	1	0	1	0	0	1	0	3
Spain	Real Betis	2	0	1	1	0	1	-1	0	1	0	0	0	0	0	1	0	1
Spain	Real Madrid	9	1	3	5	12	22	-10	1	3	1	8	8	0	0	4	4	14
Spain	Real Sociedad	2	0	1	1	2	3	-1	0	1	0	2	2	0	0	1	0	1
Spain	Sevilla	2	1	0	1	2	2	-	1	0	0	2	1	0	0	1	0	1
Spain	Tenerife	2	1	0	1	5	5	-	1	0	0	4	3	0	0	1	1	2
Spain	Valencia	4	1	0	3	4	8	-4	1	0	1	3	4	0	0	2	1	4
Sweden	Total	5	3	0	2	7	5	+2	2	0	0	6	2	1	0	2	1	3
Sweden	Malmö FF	3	2	0	1	5	4	+1	1	0	0	4	2	1	0	1	1	2
Sweden	Östers IF	2	1	0	1	2	1	+1	1	0	0	2	0	0	0	1	0	1
Switzerland	Total	6	4	2	0	12	4	+8	2	1	0	6	1	2	1	0	6	3
Switzerland	Luzern	2	2	0	0	7	1	+6	1	0	0	4	0	1	0	0	3	1
Switzerland	Neuchâtel Xamax	2	1	1	0	3	2	+1	1	0	0	1	0	0	1	0	2	2
Switzerland	Young Boys	2	1	1	0	2	1	+1	0	1	0	1	1	1	0	0	1	0
Turkey	Total	13	7	2	4	18	10	+8	4	2	0	10	3	3	0	4	8	7
Turkey	Beşiktaş	2	0	1	1	2	5	-3	0	1	0	1	1	0	0	1	1	4
Turkey	Galatasaray	3	1	0	2	3	2	+1	1	0	0	3	0	0	0	2	0	2
Turkey	Fenerbahçe	4	3	0	1	7	3	+4	2	0	0	4	2	1	0	1	3	1
Turkey	Osmanlıspor	2	1	1	0	3	0	+3	0	1	0	0	0	1	0	0	3	0
Turkey	İstanbul Başakşehir	2	2	0	0	3	0	+3	1	0	0	2	0	1	0	0	1	0
Ukraine Soviet Union	Total	13	2	5	6	14	17	-3	0	4	2	8	10	2	1	4	6	7
Ukraine Soviet Union	Chornomorets Odesa	2	1	0	1	3	1	+2	0	0	1	0	1	1	0	0	3	0
Ukraine Soviet Union	Dnipro Dnipropetrovsk	2	0	1	1	2	4	-2	0	1	0	2	2	0	0	1	0	2
Ukraine Soviet Union	Dynamo Kyiv	4	0	2	2	4	6	-2	0	2	0	4	4	0	0	2	0	2
Ukraine Soviet Union	Metalist Kharkiv	3	1	0	2	2	3	-1	0	0	1	1	2	1	0	1	1	1
Ukraine Soviet Union	Shakhtar Donetsk	2	0	2	0	3	3	-	0	1	0	1	1	0	1	0	2	2

== Notes ==
g. A third game was played in neutral field in Vienna, Austria.
