= 2007–08 UEFA Champions League knockout stage =

International football competition

The knockout stage of the 2007–08 UEFA Champions League began on 19 February 2008, and concluded on 21 May 2008 with the final at the Luzhniki Stadium in Moscow, Russia. The knockout stage involved the 16 teams who finished in the top two in each of their groups in the group stage.

Times are CET/CEST, (Note: CET (UTC+1) for matches to 11 March 2008, and CEST (UTC+2) for matches from 1 April 2008.) as listed by UEFA (local times, if different, are in parentheses).

== Format ==
Each tie in the knockout stage, apart from the final, was played over two legs, with each team playing one leg at home. The team that had the higher aggregate score over the two legs progressed to the next round. In the event that aggregate scores finished level, the team that scored more goals away from home over the two legs progressed. If away goals were also equal, 30 minutes of extra time were played. If there were goals scored during extra time and the aggregate score was still level, the visiting team qualified by virtue of more away goals scored. If no goals were scored during extra time, the tie was decided via a penalty shoot-out.

In the final, the tie was played over just one leg at a neutral venue. If scores were level at the end of normal time in the final, extra time was played, followed by penalties if scores remained tied.

== Qualified teams ==
Key to colours
Seeded in round of 16 draw
Unseeded in round of 16 draw

Group	Winners	Runners-up
A	(Portugal) Porto	(England) Liverpool
B	(England) Chelsea	(Germany) Schalke 04
C	(Spain) Real Madrid	(Greece) Olympiacos
D	(Italy) Milan	(Scotland) Celtic
E	(Spain) Barcelona	(France) Lyon
F	(England) Manchester United	(Italy) Roma
G	(Italy) Internazionale	(Turkey) Fenerbahçe
H	(Spain) Sevilla	(England) Arsenal

== Bracket ==
Round of 16
(Germany) Schalke 04 (p)	1	0	1 (4)
(Portugal) Porto	0	1	1 (1)
(Scotland) Celtic	2	0	2
(Spain) Barcelona	3	1	4
(Italy) Roma	2	2	4
(Spain) Real Madrid	1	1	2
(France) Lyon	1	0	1
(England) Manchester United	1	1	2
(England) Arsenal	0	2	2
(Italy) Milan	0	0	0
(England) Liverpool	2	1	3
(Italy) Internazionale	0	0	0
(Turkey) Fenerbahçe (p)	3	2	5 (3)
(Spain) Sevilla	2	3	5 (2)
(Greece) Olympiacos	0	0	0
(England) Chelsea	0	3	3

Quarter-finals
(Germany) Schalke 04	0	0	0
(Spain) Barcelona	1	1	2
(Italy) Roma	0	0	0
(England) Manchester United	2	1	3
(England) Arsenal	1	2	3
(England) Liverpool	1	4	5
(Turkey) Fenerbahçe	2	0	2
(England) Chelsea	1	2	3

Semi-finals
(Spain) Barcelona	0	0	0
(England) Manchester United	0	1	1
(England) Liverpool	1	2	3
(England) Chelsea (a.e.t.)	1	3	4

Final
21 May – Moscow
(England) Manchester United (p)	1 (6)
(England) Chelsea	1 (5)

== Round of 16 ==
=== Summary ===
The draw for the round of 16 was held on 21 December 2007 at 12:00 CET in Nyon, Switzerland. The first legs were played on 19 and 20 February, while the second legs were played on 4 and 5 March 2008. Due to a stadium clash with the match between Milan and Arsenal, the second leg of Internazionale's tie against Liverpool was held on 11 March.

Team 1	Agg.	Team 2	1st leg	2nd leg
Celtic (Scotland)	2–4	(Spain) Barcelona	2–3	0–1
Lyon (France)	1–2	(England) Manchester United	1–1	0–1
Schalke 04 (Germany)	1–1 (4–1 p)	(Portugal) Porto	1–0	0–1 (a.e.t.)
Liverpool (England)	3–0	(Italy) Internazionale	2–0	1–0
Roma (Italy)	4–2	(Spain) Real Madrid	2–1	2–1
Arsenal (England)	2–0	(Italy) Milan	0–0	2–0
Olympiacos (Greece)	0–3	(England) Chelsea	0–0	0–3
Fenerbahçe (Turkey)	5–5 (3–2 p)	(Spain) Sevilla	3–2	2–3 (a.e.t.)

=== Matches ===
20 February 2008
20:45 (19:45 UTC+0)

Celtic (Scotland)	2–3	(Spain) Barcelona
Vennegoor of Hesselink 16'; Robson 38'	Report	Messi 18', 79'; Henry 52'

Celtic Park, Glasgow
Attendance: 58,426
Referee: Peter Fröjdfeldt (Sweden)
4 March 2008
20:45

Barcelona (Spain)	1–0	(Scotland) Celtic
Xavi 3'	Report

Camp Nou, Barcelona
Attendance: 75,326
Referee: Pieter Vink (Netherlands)

Barcelona won 4–2 on aggregate.

20 February 2008
20:45

Lyon (France)	1–1	(England) Manchester United
Benzema 54'	Report	Tevez 87'

Stade Gerland, Lyon
Attendance: 39,219
Referee: Luis Medina Cantalejo (Spain)
4 March 2008
20:45 (19:45 UTC+0)

Manchester United (England)	1–0	(France) Lyon
Ronaldo 41'	Report

Old Trafford, Manchester
Attendance: 75,520
Referee: Roberto Rosetti (Italy)

Manchester United won 2–1 on aggregate.

19 February 2008
20:45

Schalke 04 (Germany)	1–0	(Portugal) Porto
Kurányi 4'	Report

Veltins-Arena, Gelsenkirchen
Attendance: 53,951
Referee: Laurent Duhamel (France)
5 March 2008
20:45 (19:45 UTC+0)

Porto (Portugal)	1–0 (a.e.t.)	(Germany) Schalke 04
López 86'	Report
Penalties
L. González (penalty scored); Alves (penalty missed); López (penalty missed)	1–4	(penalty scored) Rafinha; (penalty scored) Rakitić; (penalty scored) Altıntop; (penalty scored) Jones

Estádio do Dragão, Porto
Attendance: 45,316
Referee: Howard Webb (England)

1–1 on aggregate; Schalke 04 won 4–1 on penalties.

19 February 2008
20:45 (19:45 UTC+0)

Liverpool (England)	2–0	(Italy) Internazionale
Kuyt 85'; Gerrard 90'	Report

Anfield, Liverpool
Attendance: 41,999
Referee: Frank De Bleeckere (Belgium)
11 March 2008
20:45

Internazionale (Italy)	0–1	(England) Liverpool
	Report	Torres 64'

San Siro, Milan
Attendance: 78,923
Referee: Tom Henning Øvrebø (Norway)

Liverpool won 3–0 on aggregate.

19 February 2008
20:45

Roma (Italy)	2–1	(Spain) Real Madrid
Pizarro 24'; Mancini 58'	Report	Raúl 8'

Stadio Olimpico, Rome
Attendance: 56,231
Referee: Herbert Fandel (Germany)
5 March 2008
20:45

Real Madrid (Spain)	1–2	(Italy) Roma
Raúl 75'	Report	Taddei 73'; Vučinić 90+2'

Santiago Bernabéu Stadium, Madrid
Attendance: 71,569
Referee: Kyros Vassaras (Greece)

Roma won 4–2 on aggregate.

20 February 2008
20:45 (19:45 UTC+0)

Arsenal (England)	0–0	(Italy) Milan
	Report

Emirates Stadium, London
Attendance: 60,082
Referee: Claus Bo Larsen (Denmark)
4 March 2008
20:45

Milan (Italy)	0–2	(England) Arsenal
	Report	Fàbregas 84'; Adebayor 90+2'

San Siro, Milan
Attendance: 81,879
Referee: Konrad Plautz (Austria)

Arsenal won 2–0 on aggregate.

19 February 2008
20:45 (21:45 UTC+2)

Olympiacos (Greece)	0–0	(England) Chelsea
	Report

Karaiskakis Stadium, Piraeus
Attendance: 31,302
Referee: Konrad Plautz (Austria)
5 March 2008
20:45 (19:45 UTC+0)

Chelsea (England)	3–0	(Greece) Olympiacos
Ballack 5'; Lampard 25'; Kalou 48'	Report

Stamford Bridge, London
Attendance: 37,721
Referee: Manuel Mejuto González (Spain)

Chelsea won 3–0 on aggregate.

20 February 2008
20:45 (21:45 UTC+2)

Fenerbahçe (Turkey)	3–2	(Spain) Sevilla
Kežman 17'; Lugano 57'; Semih 87'	Report	Edu 23' (o.g.); Escudé 66'

Şükrü Saracoğlu Stadium, Istanbul
Attendance: 46,210
Referee: Florian Meyer (Germany)
4 March 2008
20:45

Sevilla (Spain)	3–2 (a.e.t.)	(Turkey) Fenerbahçe
Dani Alves 6'; Keita 9'; Kanouté 41'	Report	Deivid 21', 80'
Penalties
Kanouté (penalty scored); Escudé (penalty missed); Dragutinović (penalty scored); Maresca (penalty missed); Dani Alves (penalty missed)	2–3	(penalty scored) Wederson; (penalty missed) Edu; (penalty scored) Aurélio; (penalty scored) Kežman

Ramón Sánchez Pizjuán Stadium, Seville
Attendance: 38,626
Referee: Massimo Busacca (Switzerland)

5–5 on aggregate; Fenerbahçe won 3–2 on penalties.

== Quarter-finals ==
=== Summary ===
The draw for the quarter-finals was held on 14 March 2008 at 13:00 CET in Nyon, Switzerland. The first legs were played on 1 and 2 April, while the second legs were played on 8 and 9 April 2008.

Team 1	Agg.	Team 2	1st leg	2nd leg
Arsenal (England)	3–5	(England) Liverpool	1–1	2–4
Roma (Italy)	0–3	(England) Manchester United	0–2	0–1
Schalke 04 (Germany)	0–2	(Spain) Barcelona	0–1	0–1
Fenerbahçe (Turkey)	2–3	(England) Chelsea	2–1	0–2

=== Matches ===
2 April 2008
20:45 (19:45 UTC+1)

Arsenal (England)	1–1	(England) Liverpool
Adebayor 23'	Report	Kuyt 26'

Emirates Stadium, London
Attendance: 60,041
Referee: Pieter Vink (Netherlands)
8 April 2008
20:45 (19:45 UTC+1)

Liverpool (England)	4–2	(England) Arsenal
Hyypiä 30'; Torres 69'; Gerrard 85' (pen.); Babel 90+2'	Report	Diaby 13'; Adebayor 84'

Anfield, Liverpool
Attendance: 41,985
Referee: Peter Fröjdfeldt (Sweden)

Liverpool won 5–3 on aggregate.

1 April 2008
20:45

Roma (Italy)	0–2	(England) Manchester United
	Report	Ronaldo 39'; Rooney 66'

Stadio Olimpico, Rome
Attendance: 60,931
Referee: Frank De Bleeckere (Belgium)
9 April 2008
20:45 (19:45 UTC+1)

Manchester United (England)	1–0	(Italy) Roma
Tevez 70'	Report

Old Trafford, Manchester
Attendance: 74,423
Referee: Tom Henning Øvrebø (Norway)

Manchester United won 3–0 on aggregate.

1 April 2008
20:45

Schalke 04 (Germany)	0–1	(Spain) Barcelona
	Report	Bojan 12'

Arena AufSchalke, Gelsenkirchen
Attendance: 53,951
Referee: Kyros Vassaras (Greece)
9 April 2008
20:45

Barcelona (Spain)	1–0	(Germany) Schalke 04
Touré 43'	Report

Camp Nou, Barcelona
Attendance: 72,113
Referee: Roberto Rosetti (Italy)

Barcelona won 2–0 on aggregate.

2 April 2008
20:45 (21:45 UTC+3)

Fenerbahçe (Turkey)	2–1	(England) Chelsea
Kazim-Richards 65'; Deivid 81'	Report	Deivid 13' (o.g.)

Şükrü Saracoğlu Stadium, Istanbul
Attendance: 49,055
Referee: Claus Bo Larsen (Denmark)
8 April 2008
20:45 (19:45 UTC+1)

Chelsea (England)	2–0	(Turkey) Fenerbahçe
Ballack 4'; Lampard 87'	Report

Stamford Bridge, London
Attendance: 38,369
Referee: Herbert Fandel (Germany)

Chelsea won 3–2 on aggregate.

== Semi-finals ==
=== Summary ===
The draw for the semi-finals was held on 14 March 2008 at 13:00 CET in Nyon, Switzerland, after the quarter-final draw. The first legs were played on 22 and 23 April, while the second legs were played on 29 and 30 April 2008.

Team 1	Agg.	Team 2	1st leg	2nd leg
Liverpool (England)	3–4	(England) Chelsea	1–1	2–3 (a.e.t.)
Barcelona (Spain)	0–1	(England) Manchester United	0–0	0–1

=== Matches ===
22 April 2008
20:45 (19:45 UTC+1)

Liverpool (England)	1–1	(England) Chelsea
Kuyt 43'	Report	Riise 90+4' (o.g.)

Anfield, Liverpool
Attendance: 42,180
Referee: Konrad Plautz (Austria)
30 April 2008
20:45 (19:45 UTC+1)

Chelsea (England)	3–2 (a.e.t.)	(England) Liverpool
Drogba 33', 105'; Lampard 98' (pen.)	Report	Torres 64'; Babel 117'

Stamford Bridge, London
Attendance: 38,300
Referee: Roberto Rosetti (Italy)

Chelsea won 4–3 on aggregate.

23 April 2008
20:45

Barcelona (Spain)	0–0	(England) Manchester United
	Report

Camp Nou, Barcelona
Attendance: 95,949
Referee: Massimo Busacca (Switzerland)
29 April 2008
20:45 (19:45 UTC+1)

Manchester United (England)	1–0	(Spain) Barcelona
Scholes 14'	Report

Old Trafford, Manchester
Attendance: 75,061
Referee: Herbert Fandel (Germany)

Manchester United won 1–0 on aggregate.

== Final ==
The final was played on 21 May 2008 at the Luzhniki Stadium in Moscow, Russia. A draw was held on 14 March 2008, after the quarter-final and semi-final draws, to determine the "home" team for administrative purposes. The final was contested by Manchester United and Chelsea, representing the first time the final had been contested by two teams from England.

United won the match 6–5 on penalties after the game had ended in a 1–1 draw. Cristiano Ronaldo had given the eventual victors the lead after 26 minutes, only for Frank Lampard to equalise immediately before half-time. Ryan Giggs came on as a substitute late in the second half to make his 759th appearance for Manchester United, a new club record. Early in extra time, Giggs had a shot cleared off the Chelsea goal-line by John Terry, whilst Chelsea twice hit the Manchester United woodwork. A melée involving most of the 22 players ensued midway through the second half of extra time, with Didier Drogba being sent off for a slap on Nemanja Vidić right in front of the referee.

The scores level at full-time, the match went to penalties. Chelsea took the upper hand in the third round of the shoot-out as Cristiano Ronaldo's penalty was saved by Petr Čech, handing John Terry the chance to win the cup with Chelsea's fifth penalty. However, Chelsea's captain lost his footing as he went to kick the ball, and his shot hit the post. Ryan Giggs stepped up for United's seventh penalty, and scored, before Edwin van der Sar saved the following kick from Nicolas Anelka to crown Manchester United as the champions of Europe for the third time.

As winners of the competition, Manchester United went on to represent UEFA at the 2008 FIFA Club World Cup.

21 May 2008
20:45 (22:45 UTC+4)

Manchester United (England)	1–1 (a.e.t.)	(England) Chelsea
Ronaldo 26'	Report	Lampard 45'
Penalties
Tevez (penalty scored); Carrick (penalty scored); Ronaldo (penalty missed); Hargreaves (penalty scored); Nani (penalty scored); Anderson (penalty scored); Giggs (penalty scored)	6–5	(penalty scored) Ballack; (penalty scored) Belletti; (penalty scored) Lampard; (penalty scored) A. Cole; (penalty missed) Terry; (penalty scored) Kalou; (penalty missed) Anelka

Luzhniki Stadium, Moscow
Attendance: 67,310
Referee: Ľuboš Micheľ (Slovakia)
