= 2007–08 UEFA Champions League group stage =

International football competition

The 2007–08 UEFA Champions League group stage matches took place between 18 September and 12 December 2007.

== Teams ==
Seeding was determined by the UEFA coefficients. The 32 teams were allocated into four pots based on their UEFA club coefficients at the beginning of the season, with the title holders being placed in Pot 1 automatically. They were drawn into eight groups of four containing one team from each of the four seeding pots, with the restriction that teams from the same national association could not be drawn against each other. Clubs from the same association were paired up to split the matchdays between Tuesday and Wednesday. For the nations with three or four clubs in the group stage, the following clubs were paired (so that the clubs from the same pair would play on different days): Milan and Internazionale, Roma and Lazio, Barcelona and Real Madrid, Valencia and Sevilla, Arsenal and Chelsea, Liverpool and Manchester United, Benfica and Sporting CP, Werder Bremen and VfB Stuttgart. Additionally, winner of the qualifier between Sevilla and AEK Athens was paired with Olympiacos.

Key to colours in group tables
Group winners and runners-up advanced to the round of 16
Third-placed teams entered the UEFA Cup round of 32

Pot 1
Team	Notes	Coeff.
(Italy) Milan		133.808
(Spain) Barcelona		119.374
(England) Liverpool		112.618
(Italy) Internazionale		107.808
(England) Arsenal		104.618
(Spain) Real Madrid		104.374
(England) Chelsea		99.618
(England) Manchester United		99.618

Pot 2
Team	Notes	Coeff.
(Spain) Valencia		99.374
(France) Lyon		95.706
(Portugal) Porto		89.107
(Spain) Sevilla / (Greece) AEK Athens		87.374
(Netherlands) PSV Eindhoven		81.995
(Italy) Roma		78.808
(Portugal) Benfica		67.107
(Germany) Werder Bremen		63.640

Pot 3
Team	Notes	Coeff.
(Scotland) Celtic		62.064
(Germany) Schalke 04		60.640
(Germany) VfB Stuttgart		58.640
(Romania) Steaua București		55.255
(Russia) CSKA Moscow		53.920
(Portugal) Sporting CP		52.107
(Italy) Lazio		51.808
(France) Marseille		51.706

Pot 4
Team	Notes	Coeff.
(Scotland) Rangers		47.064
(Ukraine) Shakhtar Donetsk		44.726
(Turkey) Beşiktaş		43.791
(Greece) Olympiacos		42.415
(Ukraine) Dynamo Kyiv		38.726
(Turkey) Fenerbahçe		36.791
(Czech Republic) Slavia Prague		32.851
(Norway) Rosenborg		31.509

Notes

1. ^{TH} Champions League title holders (automatic top seed of pot 1)
2. ^{Q3} Winners of the third qualifying round
3. ^{†} Due to the death of Antonio Puerta, the second leg of Sevilla's third qualifying round tie against AEK Athens was postponed until 3 September, while the draw was held on 30 August. Due to the seeding criteria, both clubs were included in the draw interchangeably and their seeding was determined by the higher of the two teams' coefficients (Sevilla: 87.374, AEK Athens: 36.415). Eventually, Sevilla qualified for the group stage with a 6–1 win on aggregate against AEK Athens.

== Tie-breaking criteria ==
Based on paragraph 6.05 in the regulations for the current season, if two or more teams are equal on points on completion of the group matches, the following criteria are applied to determine the rankings:

1. higher number of points obtained in the group matches played among the teams in question;
2. superior goal difference from the group matches played among the teams in question;
3. higher number of goals scored away from home in the group matches played among the teams in question;
4. superior goal difference from all group matches played;
5. higher number of goals scored in all group matches played;
6. higher number of coefficient points accumulated by the club in question, as well as its association, over the previous five seasons.

== Groups ==
Times are CET/CEST, (Note: CET (UTC+1) for matches from 6 November 2007, and CEST (UTC+2) for matches to 24 October 2007.) as listed by UEFA (local times, if different, are in parentheses).

=== Group A ===
Pos	Team	Pld	W	D	L	GF	GA	GD	Pts	Qualification	POR	LIV	MAR	BES
1	(Portugal) Porto	6	3	2	1	8	7	+1	11	Advance to knockout stage	—	1–1	2–1	2–0
2	(England) Liverpool	6	3	1	2	18	5	+13	10	Advance to knockout stage	4–1	—	0–1	8–0
3	(France) Marseille	6	2	1	3	6	9	−3	7	Transfer to UEFA Cup	1–1	0–4	—	2–0
4	(Turkey) Beşiktaş	6	2	0	4	4	15	−11	6		0–1	2–1	2–1	—

Source: RSSSF
18 September 2007
20:45

Marseille (France)	2–0	(Turkey) Beşiktaş
Rodriguez 76'; Cissé 90+1'	Report

Stade Vélodrome, Marseille
Attendance: 35,676
Referee: Matteo Trefoloni (Italy)
18 September 2007
20:45 (19:45 UTC+1)

Porto (Portugal)	1–1	(England) Liverpool
L. González 8' (pen.)	Report	Kuyt 17'

Estádio do Dragão, Porto
Attendance: 41,208
Referee: Ľuboš Micheľ (Slovakia)

3 October 2007
20:45 (19:45 UTC+1)

Liverpool (England)	0–1	(France) Marseille
	Report	Valbuena 77'

Anfield, Liverpool
Attendance: 41,355
Referee: Konrad Plautz (Austria)
3 October 2007
20:45 (21:45 UTC+3)

Beşiktaş (Turkey)	0–1	(Portugal) Porto
	Report	Quaresma 90+2'

BJK İnönü Stadium, Istanbul
Attendance: 19,795
Referee: Pieter Vink (Netherlands)

24 October 2007
20:45 (21:45 UTC+3)

Beşiktaş (Turkey)	2–1	(England) Liverpool
Hyypiä 13' (o.g.); Bobô 82'	Report	Gerrard 85'

BJK İnönü Stadium, Istanbul
Attendance: 25,837
Referee: Claus Bo Larsen (Denmark)
24 October 2007
20:45

Marseille (France)	1–1	(Portugal) Porto
Niang 70'	Report	L. González 79' (pen.)

Stade Vélodrome, Marseille
Attendance: 46,458
Referee: Manuel Mejuto González (Spain)

6 November 2007
20:45 (19:45 UTC+0)

Liverpool (England)	8–0	(Turkey) Beşiktaş
Crouch 19', 89'; Benayoun 32', 53', 56'; Gerrard 69'; Babel 79', 81'	Report

Anfield, Liverpool
Attendance: 41,143
Referee: Markus Merk (Germany)
6 November 2007
20:45 (19:45 UTC+0)

Porto (Portugal)	2–1	(France) Marseille
Sektioui 27'; López 78'	Report	Niang 47'

Estádio do Dragão, Porto
Attendance: 42,217
Referee: Wolfgang Stark (Germany)

28 November 2007
20:45 (21:45 UTC+3)

Beşiktaş (Turkey)	2–1	(France) Marseille
Tello 27'; Bobô 88'	Report	Taiwo 65'

BJK İnönü Stadium, Istanbul
Attendance: 19,448
Referee: Luis Medina Cantalejo (Spain)
28 November 2007
20:45 (19:45 UTC+0)

Liverpool (England)	4–1	(Portugal) Porto
Torres 19', 78'; Gerrard 84' (pen.); Crouch 87'	Report	López 33'

Anfield, Liverpool
Attendance: 41,095
Referee: Roberto Rosetti (Italy)

11 December 2007
20:45

Marseille (France)	0–4	(England) Liverpool
	Report	Gerrard 4'; Torres 11'; Kuyt 48'; Babel 90+1'

Stade Vélodrome, Marseille
Attendance: 53,097
Referee: Terje Hauge (Norway)
11 December 2007
20:45 (19:45 UTC+0)

Porto (Portugal)	2–0	(Turkey) Beşiktaş
L. González 44'; Quaresma 62'	Report

Estádio do Dragão, Porto
Attendance: 39,608
Referee: Peter Fröjdfeldt (Sweden)

=== Group B ===
Pos	Team	Pld	W	D	L	GF	GA	GD	Pts	Qualification	CHE	SCH	ROS	VAL
1	(England) Chelsea	6	3	3	0	9	2	+7	12	Advance to knockout stage	—	2–0	1–1	0–0
2	(Germany) Schalke 04	6	2	2	2	5	4	+1	8	Advance to knockout stage	0–0	—	3–1	0–1
3	(Norway) Rosenborg	6	2	1	3	6	10	−4	7	Transfer to UEFA Cup	0–4	0–2	—	2–0
4	(Spain) Valencia	6	1	2	3	2	6	−4	5		1–2	0–0	0–2	—

Source: RSSSF
18 September 2007
20:45 (19:45 UTC+1)

Chelsea (England)	1–1	(Norway) Rosenborg
Shevchenko 53'	Report	Koppinen 24'

Stamford Bridge, London
Attendance: 24,973
Referee: Laurent Duhamel (France)
18 September 2007
20:45

Schalke 04 (Germany)	0–1	(Spain) Valencia
	Report	Villa 63'

Arena AufSchalke, Gelsenkirchen
Attendance: 53,951
Referee: Jan Wegereef (Netherlands)

3 October 2007
20:45

Valencia (Spain)	1–2	(England) Chelsea
Villa 9'	Report	J. Cole 21'; Drogba 71'

Mestalla Stadium, Valencia
Attendance: 34,935
Referee: Roberto Rosetti (Italy)
3 October 2007
20:45

Rosenborg (Norway)	0–2	(Germany) Schalke 04
	Report	Jones 62'; Kurányi 89'

Lerkendal Stadion, Trondheim
Attendance: 21,361
Referee: Grzegorz Gilewski (Poland)

24 October 2007
20:45

Rosenborg (Norway)	2–0	(Spain) Valencia
Koné 53'; Riseth 61'	Report

Lerkendal Stadion, Trondheim
Attendance: 21,119
Referee: Craig Thomson (Scotland)
24 October 2007
20:45 (19:45 UTC+1)

Chelsea (England)	2–0	(Germany) Schalke 04
Malouda 4'; Drogba 47'	Report

Stamford Bridge, London
Attendance: 40,910
Referee: Peter Fröjdfeldt (Sweden)

6 November 2007
20:45

Valencia (Spain)	0–2	(Norway) Rosenborg
	Report	Iversen 31', 58'

Mestalla Stadium, Valencia
Attendance: 29,725
Referee: Alon Yefet (Israel)
6 November 2007
20:45

Schalke 04 (Germany)	0–0	(England) Chelsea
	Report

Arena AufSchalke, Gelsenkirchen
Attendance: 53,951
Referee: Massimo Busacca (Switzerland)

28 November 2007
20:45

Rosenborg (Norway)	0–4	(England) Chelsea
	Report	Drogba 8', 20'; Alex 40'; J. Cole 73'

Lerkendal Stadion, Trondheim
Attendance: 21,582
Referee: Olegário Benquerença (Portugal)
28 November 2007
20:45

Valencia (Spain)	0–0	(Germany) Schalke 04
	Report

Mestalla Stadium, Valencia
Attendance: 29,232
Referee: Frank De Bleeckere (Belgium)

11 December 2007
20:45 (19:45 UTC+0)

Chelsea (England)	0–0	(Spain) Valencia
	Report

Stamford Bridge, London
Attendance: 41,139
Referee: Grzegorz Gilewski (Poland)
11 December 2007
20:45

Schalke 04 (Germany)	3–1	(Norway) Rosenborg
Asamoah 12'; Rafinha 19'; Kurányi 36'	Report	Koné 23'

Arena AufSchalke, Gelsenkirchen
Attendance: 53,951
Referee: Mike Riley (England)

=== Group C ===
Pos	Team	Pld	W	D	L	GF	GA	GD	Pts	Qualification	RMA	OLY	BRM	LAZ
1	(Spain) Real Madrid	6	3	2	1	13	9	+4	11	Advance to knockout stage	—	4–2	2–1	3–1
2	(Greece) Olympiacos	6	3	2	1	11	7	+4	11	Advance to knockout stage	0–0	—	3–0	1–1
3	(Germany) Werder Bremen	6	2	0	4	8	13	−5	6	Transfer to UEFA Cup	3–2	1–3	—	2–1
4	(Italy) Lazio	6	1	2	3	8	11	−3	5		2–2	1–2	2–1	—

Source: RSSSF
18 September 2007
20:45

Real Madrid (Spain)	2–1	(Germany) Werder Bremen
Raúl 16'; Van Nistelrooy 74'	Report	Sanogo 17'

Santiago Bernabéu Stadium, Madrid
Attendance: 63,500
Referee: Howard Webb (England)
18 September 2007
20:45 (21:45 UTC+3)

Olympiacos (Greece)	1–1	(Italy) Lazio
Galletti 55'	Report	Zauri 77'

Karaiskakis Stadium, Piraeus
Attendance: 171 (Note: Olympiacos ordered to play match behind closed doors after crowd trouble against Shakhtar Donetsk in the previous Champions League campaign on 5 December 2006.)
Referee: Eric Braamhaar (Netherlands)

3 October 2007
20:45

Werder Bremen (Germany)	1–3	(Greece) Olympiacos
Almeida 32'	Report	Stoltidis 72'; Patsatzoglou 82'; Kovačević 87'

Weserstadion, Bremen
Attendance: 37,500
Referee: Claus Bo Larsen (Denmark)
3 October 2007
20:45

Lazio (Italy)	2–2	(Spain) Real Madrid
Pandev 32', 75'	Report	Van Nistelrooy 8', 61'

Stadio Olimpico, Rome
Attendance: 52,400
Referee: Frank De Bleeckere (Belgium)

24 October 2007
20:45

Werder Bremen (Germany)	2–1	(Italy) Lazio
Sanogo 28'; Almeida 54'	Report	Manfredini 82'

Weserstadion, Bremen
Attendance: 36,587
Referee: Olegário Benquerença (Portugal)
24 October 2007
20:45

Real Madrid (Spain)	4–2	(Greece) Olympiacos
Raúl 2'; Robinho 68', 83'; Balboa 90'	Report	Galletti 8'; Júlio César 47'

Santiago Bernabéu Stadium, Madrid
Attendance: 64,477
Referee: Tom Henning Øvrebø (Norway)

6 November 2007
20:45

Lazio (Italy)	2–1	(Germany) Werder Bremen
Rocchi 57', 68'	Report	Diego 86' (pen.)

Stadio Olimpico, Rome
Attendance: 28,236
Referee: Ivan Bebek (Croatia)
6 November 2007
20:45 (21:45 UTC+2)

Olympiacos (Greece)	0–0	(Spain) Real Madrid
	Report

Karaiskakis Stadium, Piraeus
Attendance: 30,549
Referee: Ľuboš Micheľ (Slovakia)

28 November 2007
20:45

Werder Bremen (Germany)	3–2	(Spain) Real Madrid
Rosenberg 4'; Sanogo 40'; Hunt 58'	Report	Robinho 14'; Van Nistelrooy 72'

Weserstadion, Bremen
Attendance: 36,350
Referee: Pieter Vink (Netherlands)
28 November 2007
20:45

Lazio (Italy)	1–2	(Greece) Olympiacos
Pandev 30'	Report	Galletti 35'; Kovačević 64'

Stadio Olimpico, Rome
Attendance: 39,996
Referee: Howard Webb (England)

11 December 2007
20:45

Real Madrid (Spain)	3–1	(Italy) Lazio
Baptista 13'; Raúl 16'; Robinho 36'	Report	Pandev 81'

Santiago Bernabéu Stadium, Madrid
Attendance: 70,559
Referee: Massimo Busacca (Switzerland)
11 December 2007
20:45 (21:45 UTC+2)

Olympiacos (Greece)	3–0	(Germany) Werder Bremen
Stoltidis 12', 74'; Kovačević 70'	Report

Karaiskakis Stadium, Piraeus
Attendance: 30,297
Referee: Laurent Duhamel (France)

=== Group D ===
Pos	Team	Pld	W	D	L	GF	GA	GD	Pts	Qualification	MIL	CEL	BEN	SHK
1	(Italy) Milan	6	4	1	1	12	5	+7	13	Advance to knockout stage	—	1–0	2–1	4–1
2	(Scotland) Celtic	6	3	0	3	5	6	−1	9	Advance to knockout stage	2–1	—	1–0	2–1
3	(Portugal) Benfica	6	2	1	3	5	6	−1	7	Transfer to UEFA Cup	1–1	1–0	—	0–1
4	(Ukraine) Shakhtar Donetsk	6	2	0	4	6	11	−5	6		0–3	2–0	1–2	—

Source: RSSSF
18 September 2007
20:45

Milan (Italy)	2–1	(Portugal) Benfica
Pirlo 9'; Inzaghi 24'	Report	Nuno Gomes 90+2'

San Siro, Milan
Attendance: 38,358
Referee: Mike Riley (England)
18 September 2007
20:45 (21:45 UTC+3)

Shakhtar Donetsk (Ukraine)	2–0	(Scotland) Celtic
Brandão 5'; Lucarelli 8'	Report

RSC Olimpiyskiy, Donetsk
Attendance: 25,700
Referee: Alberto Undiano Mallenco (Spain)

3 October 2007
20:45 (19:45 UTC+1)

Celtic (Scotland)	2–1	(Italy) Milan
McManus 62'; McDonald 90'	Report	Kaká 68' (pen.)

Celtic Park, Glasgow
Attendance: 58,642
Referee: Markus Merk (Germany)
3 October 2007
20:45 (19:45 UTC+1)

Benfica (Portugal)	0–1	(Ukraine) Shakhtar Donetsk
	Report	Jádson 42'

Estádio da Luz, Lisbon
Attendance: 34,647
Referee: Wolfgang Stark (Germany)

24 October 2007
20:45

Milan (Italy)	4–1	(Ukraine) Shakhtar Donetsk
Gilardino 6', 14'; Seedorf 62', 69'	Report	Lucarelli 51'

San Siro, Milan
Attendance: 36,850
Referee: Luis Medina Cantalejo (Spain)
24 October 2007
20:45 (19:45 UTC+1)

Benfica (Portugal)	1–0	(Scotland) Celtic
Cardozo 87'	Report

Estádio da Luz, Lisbon
Attendance: 38,512
Referee: Massimo Busacca (Switzerland)

6 November 2007
20:45 (21:45 UTC+2)

Shakhtar Donetsk (Ukraine)	0–3	(Italy) Milan
	Report	Inzaghi 66', 90+3'; Kaká 72'

RSC Olimpiyskiy, Donetsk
Attendance: 25,700
Referee: Pieter Vink (Netherlands)
6 November 2007
20:45 (19:45 UTC+0)

Celtic (Scotland)	1–0	(Portugal) Benfica
McGeady 45'	Report

Celtic Park, Glasgow
Attendance: 58,691
Referee: Martin Hansson (Sweden)

28 November 2007
20:45 (19:45 UTC+0)

Benfica (Portugal)	1–1	(Italy) Milan
M. Pereira 20'	Report	Pirlo 15'

Estádio da Luz, Lisbon
Attendance: 46,034
Referee: Herbert Fandel (Germany)
28 November 2007
20:45 (19:45 UTC+0)

Celtic (Scotland)	2–1	(Ukraine) Shakhtar Donetsk
Jarošík 45'; Donati 90+2'	Report	Brandão 4'

Celtic Park, Glasgow
Attendance: 59,396
Referee: Bertrand Layec (France)

4 December 2007
20:45

Milan (Italy)	1–0	(Scotland) Celtic
Inzaghi 70'	Report

San Siro, Milan
Attendance: 38,409
Referee: Tom Henning Øvrebø (Norway)
4 December 2007
20:45 (21:45 UTC+2)

Shakhtar Donetsk (Ukraine)	1–2	(Portugal) Benfica
Lucarelli 30' (pen.)	Report	Cardozo 6', 22'

RSC Olimpiyskiy, Donetsk
Attendance: 24,200
Referee: Kyros Vassaras (Greece)

=== Group E ===
Pos	Team	Pld	W	D	L	GF	GA	GD	Pts	Qualification	BAR	LYO	RAN	STU
1	(Spain) Barcelona	6	4	2	0	12	3	+9	14	Advance to knockout stage	—	3–0	2–0	3–1
2	(France) Lyon	6	3	1	2	11	10	+1	10	Advance to knockout stage	2–2	—	0–3	4–2
3	(Scotland) Rangers	6	2	1	3	7	9	−2	7	Transfer to UEFA Cup	0–0	0–3	—	2–1
4	(Germany) VfB Stuttgart	6	1	0	5	7	15	−8	3		0–2	0–2	3–2	—

Source: RSSSF
19 September 2007
20:45 (19:45 UTC+1)

Rangers (Scotland)	2–1	(Germany) VfB Stuttgart
Adam 62'; Darcheville 75' (pen.)	Report	Gómez 56'

Ibrox Stadium, Glasgow
Attendance: 49,795
Referee: Stefano Farina (Italy)
19 September 2007
20:45

Barcelona (Spain)	3–0	(France) Lyon
Clerc 22' (o.g.); Messi 82'; Henry 90+1'	Report

Camp Nou, Barcelona
Attendance: 78,689
Referee: Massimo Busacca (Switzerland)

2 October 2007
20:45

VfB Stuttgart (Germany)	0–2	(Spain) Barcelona
	Report	Puyol 58'; Messi 66'

Gottlieb-Daimler-Stadion, Stuttgart
Attendance: 49,725
Referee: Martin Hansson (Sweden)
2 October 2007
20:45

Lyon (France)	0–3	(Scotland) Rangers
	Report	McCulloch 23'; Cousin 48'; Beasley 53'

Stade de Gerland, Lyon
Attendance: 38,076
Referee: Tom Henning Øvrebø (Norway)

23 October 2007
20:45 (19:45 UTC+1)

Rangers (Scotland)	0–0	(Spain) Barcelona
	Report

Ibrox Stadium, Glasgow
Attendance: 49,957
Referee: Konrad Plautz (Austria)
23 October 2007
20:45

VfB Stuttgart (Germany)	0–2	(France) Lyon
	Report	Santos 55'; Benzema 79'

Gottlieb-Daimler-Stadion, Stuttgart
Attendance: 51,000
Referee: Lucílio Batista (Portugal)

7 November 2007
20:45

Lyon (France)	4–2	(Germany) VfB Stuttgart
Ben Arfa 5', 37'; Källström 15'; Juninho 90'	Report	Gómez 16', 56'

Stade de Gerland, Lyon
Attendance: 38,215
Referee: Yuri Baskakov (Russia)
7 November 2007
20:45

Barcelona (Spain)	2–0	(Scotland) Rangers
Henry 6'; Messi 43'	Report

Camp Nou, Barcelona
Attendance: 82,887
Referee: Eric Braamhaar (Netherlands)

27 November 2007
20:45

VfB Stuttgart (Germany)	3–2	(Scotland) Rangers
Cacau 45'; Pardo 62'; Marica 85'	Report	Adam 27'; Ferguson 70'

Gottlieb-Daimler-Stadion, Stuttgart
Attendance: 51,000
Referee: Darko Čeferin (Slovenia)
27 November 2007
20:45

Lyon (France)	2–2	(Spain) Barcelona
Juninho 7', 80' (pen.)	Report	Iniesta 3'; Messi 58' (pen.)

Stade de Gerland, Lyon
Attendance: 36,500
Referee: Stefano Farina (Italy)

12 December 2007
20:45 (19:45 UTC+0)

Rangers (Scotland)	0–3	(France) Lyon
	Report	Govou 16'; Benzema 85', 88'

Ibrox Stadium, Glasgow
Attendance: 50,260
Referee: Ľuboš Micheľ (Slovakia)
12 December 2007
20:45

Barcelona (Spain)	3–1	(Germany) VfB Stuttgart
Dos Santos 36'; Eto'o 57'; Ronaldinho 67'	Report	Da Silva 3'

Camp Nou, Barcelona
Attendance: 52,761
Referee: Stéphane Lannoy (France)

=== Group F ===
Pos	Team	Pld	W	D	L	GF	GA	GD	Pts	Qualification	MUN	ROM	SPO	DKV
1	(England) Manchester United	6	5	1	0	13	4	+9	16	Advance to knockout stage	—	1–0	2–1	4–0
2	(Italy) Roma	6	3	2	1	11	6	+5	11	Advance to knockout stage	1–1	—	2–1	2–0
3	(Portugal) Sporting CP	6	2	1	3	9	8	+1	7	Transfer to UEFA Cup	0–1	2–2	—	3–0
4	(Ukraine) Dynamo Kyiv	6	0	0	6	4	19	−15	0		2–4	1–4	1–2	—

Source: RSSSF
19 September 2007
20:45 (19:45 UTC+1)

Sporting CP (Portugal)	0–1	(England) Manchester United
	Report	Ronaldo 62'

Estádio José Alvalade, Lisbon
Attendance: 41,510
Referee: Herbert Fandel (Germany)
19 September 2007
20:45

Roma (Italy)	2–0	(Ukraine) Dynamo Kyiv
Perrotta 9'; Totti 70'	Report

Stadio Olimpico, Rome
Attendance: 35,508
Referee: Alain Hamer (Luxembourg)

2 October 2007
20:45 (19:45 UTC+1)

Manchester United (England)	1–0	(Italy) Roma
Rooney 70'	Report

Old Trafford, Manchester
Attendance: 73,652
Referee: Manuel Mejuto González (Spain)
2 October 2007
20:45 (21:45 UTC+3)

Dynamo Kyiv (Ukraine)	1–2	(Portugal) Sporting CP
Vashchuk 28'	Report	Tonel 14'; Polga 38'

Olimpiyskiy NSC, Kyiv
Attendance: 37,600
Referee: Bertrand Layec (France)

23 October 2007
20:45

Roma (Italy)	2–1	(Portugal) Sporting CP
Juan 15'; Vučinić 69'	Report	Liédson 18'

Stadio Olimpico, Rome
Attendance: 26,893
Referee: Terje Hauge (Norway)
23 October 2007
20:45 (21:45 UTC+3)

Dynamo Kyiv (Ukraine)	2–4	(England) Manchester United
Rincón 33'; Bangoura 79'	Report	Ferdinand 10'; Rooney 18'; Ronaldo 41', 68' (pen.)

Olimpiyskiy NSC, Kyiv
Attendance: 42,000
Referee: Viktor Kassai (Hungary)

7 November 2007
20:45 (19:45 UTC+0)

Sporting CP (Portugal)	2–2	(Italy) Roma
Liédson 23', 65'	Report	Cassetti 4'; Polga 89' (o.g.)

Estádio José Alvalade, Lisbon
Attendance: 32,273
Referee: Frank De Bleeckere (Belgium)
7 November 2007
20:45 (19:45 UTC+0)

Manchester United (England)	4–0	(Ukraine) Dynamo Kyiv
Piqué 31'; Tevez 37'; Rooney 76'; Ronaldo 88'	Report

Old Trafford, Manchester
Attendance: 75,017
Referee: Jan Wegereef (Netherlands)

27 November 2007
20:45 (21:45 UTC+2)

Dynamo Kyiv (Ukraine)	1–4	(Italy) Roma
Bangoura 62'	Report	Panucci 4'; Giuly 32'; Vučinić 36', 77'

Olimpiyskiy NSC, Kyiv
Attendance: 19,700
Referee: Wolfgang Stark (Germany)
27 November 2007
20:45 (19:45 UTC+0)

Manchester United (England)	2–1	(Portugal) Sporting CP
Tevez 61'; Ronaldo 90+2'	Report	Abel 22'

Old Trafford, Manchester
Attendance: 74,162
Referee: Claus Bo Larsen (Denmark)

12 December 2007
20:45

Roma (Italy)	1–1	(England) Manchester United
Mancini 71'	Report	Piqué 34'

Stadio Olimpico, Rome
Attendance: 29,490
Referee: Martin Hansson (Sweden)
12 December 2007
20:45 (19:45 UTC+0)

Sporting CP (Portugal)	3–0	(Ukraine) Dynamo Kyiv
Polga 35' (pen.); Moutinho 67'; Liédson 89'	Report

Estádio José Alvalade, Lisbon
Attendance: 19,402
Referee: Stuart Dougal (Scotland)

=== Group G ===
Pos	Team	Pld	W	D	L	GF	GA	GD	Pts	Qualification	INT	FEN	PSV	CSKA
1	(Italy) Internazionale	6	5	0	1	12	4	+8	15	Advance to knockout stage	—	3–0	2–0	4–2
2	(Turkey) Fenerbahçe	6	3	2	1	8	6	+2	11	Advance to knockout stage	1–0	—	2–0	3–1
3	(Netherlands) PSV Eindhoven	6	2	1	3	3	6	−3	7	Transfer to UEFA Cup	0–1	0–0	—	2–1
4	(Russia) CSKA Moscow	6	0	1	5	7	14	−7	1		1–2	2–2	0–1	—

Source: RSSSF
19 September 2007
20:45 (21:45 UTC+3)

Fenerbahçe (Turkey)	1–0	(Italy) Internazionale
Deivid 43'	Report

Şükrü Saracoğlu Stadium, Istanbul
Attendance: 44,212
Referee: Luis Medina Cantalejo (Spain)
19 September 2007
20:45

PSV Eindhoven (Netherlands)	2–1	(Russia) CSKA Moscow
Lazović 60'; Perez 80'	Report	Vágner Love 89'

Philips Stadion, Eindhoven
Attendance: 30,000
Referee: Pedro Proença (Portugal)

2 October 2007
18:30 (20:30 UTC+4)

CSKA Moscow (Russia)	2–2	(Turkey) Fenerbahçe
Krasić 48'; Vágner Love 53' (pen.)	Report	Alex 9'; Deivid 86'

Lokomotiv Stadium, Moscow
Attendance: 25,000
Referee: Knut Kircher (Germany)
2 October 2007
20:45

Internazionale (Italy)	2–0	(Netherlands) PSV Eindhoven
Ibrahimović 15' (pen.), 31'	Report

San Siro, Milan
Attendance: 23,882
Referee: Kyros Vassaras (Greece)

23 October 2007
20:45

PSV Eindhoven (Netherlands)	0–0	(Turkey) Fenerbahçe
	Report

Philips Stadion, Eindhoven
Attendance: 35,000
Referee: Howard Webb (England)
23 October 2007
18:30 (20:30 UTC+3)

CSKA Moscow (Russia)	1–2	(Italy) Internazionale
Jô 32'	Report	Crespo 52'; Samuel 80'

Lokomotiv Stadium, Moscow
Attendance: 24,000
Referee: Mike Riley (England)

7 November 2007
20:45 (21:45 UTC+2)

Fenerbahçe (Turkey)	2–0	(Netherlands) PSV Eindhoven
Marcellis 28' (o.g.); Semih 30'	Report

Şükrü Saracoğlu Stadium, Istanbul
Attendance: 46,229
Referee: Alain Hamer (Luxembourg)
7 November 2007
20:45

Internazionale (Italy)	4–2	(Russia) CSKA Moscow
Ibrahimović 32', 75'; Cambiasso 34', 67'	Report	Jô 22'; Vágner Love 31'

San Siro, Milan
Attendance: 17,495
Referee: Paul Allaerts (Belgium)

27 November 2007
18:30 (20:30 UTC+3)

CSKA Moscow (Russia)	0–1	(Netherlands) PSV Eindhoven
	Report	Farfán 39'

Lokomotiv Stadium, Moscow
Attendance: 12,418
Referee: Manuel Mejuto González (Spain)
27 November 2007
20:45

Internazionale (Italy)	3–0	(Turkey) Fenerbahçe
Cruz 55'; Ibrahimović 66'; Jiménez 90+2'	Report

San Siro, Milan
Attendance: 24,736
Referee: Konrad Plautz (Austria)

12 December 2007
20:45

PSV Eindhoven (Netherlands)	0–1	(Italy) Internazionale
	Report	Cruz 64'

Philips Stadion, Eindhoven
Attendance: 35,000
Referee: Markus Merk (Germany)
12 December 2007
20:45 (21:45 UTC+2)

Fenerbahçe (Turkey)	3–1	(Russia) CSKA Moscow
Alex 32'; Boral 45+1', 90'	Report	Edu 30' (o.g.)

Şükrü Saracoğlu Stadium, Istanbul
Attendance: 45,745
Referee: Matteo Trefoloni (Italy)

=== Group H ===
Pos	Team	Pld	W	D	L	GF	GA	GD	Pts	Qualification	SEV	ARS	SLP	STE
1	(Spain) Sevilla	6	5	0	1	14	7	+7	15	Advance to knockout stage	—	3–1	4–2	2–1
2	(England) Arsenal	6	4	1	1	14	4	+10	13	Advance to knockout stage	3–0	—	7–0	2–1
3	(Czech Republic) Slavia Prague	6	1	2	3	5	16	−11	5	Transfer to UEFA Cup	0–3	0–0	—	2–1
4	(Romania) Steaua București	6	0	1	5	4	10	−6	1		0–2	0–1	1–1	—

Source: RSSSF
19 September 2007
20:45 (19:45 UTC+1)

Arsenal (England)	3–0	(Spain) Sevilla
Fàbregas 28'; Van Persie 59'; Eduardo 90'	Report

Emirates Stadium, London
Attendance: 59,992
Referee: Peter Fröjdfeldt (Sweden)
19 September 2007
20:45

Slavia Prague (Czech Republic)	2–1	(Romania) Steaua București
Šenkeřík 14'; Belaid 63'	Report	Goian 33'

Stadion Evžena Rošického, Prague
Attendance: 15,723
Referee: Olegário Benquerença (Portugal)

2 October 2007
20:45 (21:45 UTC+3)

Steaua București (Romania)	0–1	(England) Arsenal
	Report	Van Persie 76'

Stadionul Steaua, Bucharest
Attendance: 12,807
Referee: Terje Hauge (Norway)
2 October 2007
20:45

Sevilla (Spain)	4–2	(Czech Republic) Slavia Prague
Kanouté 9'; Luís Fabiano 27'; Escudé 58'; Koné 69'	Report	Pudil 19'; Kalivoda 90'

Ramón Sánchez Pizjuán Stadium, Seville
Attendance: 24,202
Referee: Yuri Baskakov (Russia)

23 October 2007
20:45

Sevilla (Spain)	2–1	(Romania) Steaua București
Kanouté 5'; Luís Fabiano 18'	Report	Petre 64'

Ramón Sánchez Pizjuán Stadium, Seville
Attendance: 28,945
Referee: Roberto Rosetti (Italy)
23 October 2007
20:45 (19:45 UTC+1)

Arsenal (England)	7–0	(Czech Republic) Slavia Prague
Fàbregas 5', 58'; Hubáček 24' (o.g.); Walcott 41', 55'; Hleb 51'; Bendtner 89'	Report

Emirates Stadium, London
Attendance: 59,621
Referee: Stefano Farina (Italy)

7 November 2007
20:45 (21:45 UTC+2)

Steaua București (Romania)	0–2	(Spain) Sevilla
	Report	Renato 25', 65'

Stadionul Steaua, Bucharest
Attendance: 7,984
Referee: Herbert Fandel (Germany)
7 November 2007
20:45

Slavia Prague (Czech Republic)	0–0	(England) Arsenal
	Report

Stadion Evžena Rošického, Prague
Attendance: 18,000
Referee: Bertrand Layec (France)

27 November 2007
20:45

Sevilla (Spain)	3–1	(England) Arsenal
Keita 24'; Luís Fabiano 34'; Kanouté 89' (pen.)	Report	Eduardo 11'

Ramón Sánchez Pizjuán Stadium, Seville
Attendance: 35,529
Referee: Eric Braamhaar (Netherlands)
27 November 2007
20:45 (21:45 UTC+2)

Steaua București (Romania)	1–1	(Czech Republic) Slavia Prague
Badea 12'	Report	Šenkeřík 78'

Stadionul Steaua, Bucharest
Attendance: 8,287
Referee: Alain Hamer (Luxembourg)

12 December 2007
20:45 (19:45 UTC+0)

Arsenal (England)	2–1	(Romania) Steaua București
Diaby 8'; Bendtner 42'	Report	Zaharia 68'

Emirates Stadium, London
Attendance: 59,786
Referee: Yuri Baskakov (Russia)
12 December 2007
20:45

Slavia Prague (Czech Republic)	0–3	(Spain) Sevilla
	Report	Luís Fabiano 66'; Kanouté 69'; Dani Alves 87'

Stadion Evžena Rošického, Prague
Attendance: 11,689
Referee: Viktor Kassai (Hungary)
