= 2007–08 Galatasaray S.K. season =

Galatasaray
2007–08 season
- President: (Turkey) Özhan Canaydın (until 22 March 2008) (Turkey) Adnan Polat
- Head coach: (Germany) Karl-Heinz Feldkamp (until 30 March 2008) (Turkey) Cevat Güler (interim)
- Stadium: Ali Sami Yen Stadı
- Süper Lig: 1st
- Turkish Cup: Semi-finals
- UEFA Cup: Third round
- Top goalscorer: League: Ümit Karan (11); All: Ümit Karan (17)
Home colours	Away colours	Third colours

The 2007–08 season was Galatasaray's 104th in existence and the 50th consecutive season in the Süper Lig. This article shows statistics of the club's players in the season, and also lists all matches that the club have played in the season.

== Squad statistics ==
No.	Pos.	Name	Süper Lig		Türkiye Kupası		UEFA Cup		Total	
No.	Pos.	Name	Apps	Goals	Apps	Goals	Apps	Goals	Apps	Goals
54	GK	(Turkey) Orkun Uşak	21	0	2	0	9	0	32	0
1	GK	(Turkey) Aykut Erçetin	13	0	6	0	1	0	20	0
88	DF	(Turkey) Sadrettin Fırat Kocaoğlu	0	0	0	0	0	0	0	0
76	DF	(Turkey) Servet Çetin	33	3	8	0	10	0	51	3
74	DF	(Turkey) Volkan Yaman	27	1	5	0	10	1	42	2
55	DF	(Turkey) Sabri Sarıoğlu	22	1	6	0	6	0	34	1
22	DF	(Turkey) Hakan Balta	27	3	4	0	1	0	32	3
4	DF	(Cameroon) Rigobert Song	22	0	2	1	8	1	35	1
33	DF	(Turkey) Uğur Uçar	21	0	4	0	8	0	33	0
2	DF	(Turkey) Emre Güngör	16	0	7	0	2	0	25	0
19	DF	(Algeria) Ismaël Bouzid	10	0	5	0	2	0	18	0
-	DF	(Turkey) Cihan Can	0	0	0	0	0	0	0	
66	MF	(Turkey) Arda Turan	30	7	7	0	7	1	44	8
8	MF	(Turkey) Barış Özbek	30	2	8	1	8	0	36	3
14	MF	(Turkey) Mehmet Topal	26	1	7	1	6	0	39	2
61	MF	(Turkey) Serkan Çalık	17	3	7	1	5	1	29	5
10	MF	(Brazil) Cassio Lincoln	19	5	2	0	7	2	28	7
18	MF	(Turkey) Ayhan Akman	17	1	3	0	5	1	25	2
11	MF	(Turkey) Hasan Şaş	10	1	4	0	8	0	22	1
87	MF	(Turkey) Mehmet Güven	12	0	5	1	2	0	19	1
6	MF	(Sweden) Tobias Linderoth	7	0	0	0	5	1	12	1
16	MF	(Argentina) Marcelo Carrusca	3	1	3	1	2	0	8	2
7	MF	(Turkey) Okan Buruk	4	1	2	0	2	0	8	1
15	MF	(Ghana) Ahmed Barusso	2	0	0	0	1	1	3	1
30	MF	(Turkey) Çağrı Yarkın	0	0	0	0	0	0	0	0
99	FW	(Turkey) Ümit Karan	30	11	7	3	9	3	46	17
9	FW	(Turkey) Hakan Şükür (C)	28	11	4	1	9	2	41	14
20	FW	(Republic of the Congo) Shabani Nonda	24	11	3	0	6	3	33	14
27	FW	(Turkey) Özgür Can Özcan	0	0	0	0	0	0	0	0

== Süper Lig ==
=== Standings ===
Pos	Team	Pld	W	D	L	GF	GA	GD	Pts	Qualification or relegation
1	Galatasaray (C)	34	24	7	3	64	23	+41	79	Qualification to Champions League third qualifying round
2	Fenerbahçe	34	22	7	5	72	37	+35	73 (Note: Fenerbahçe were ahead of Beşiktaş and Sivasspor on head-to-head points and Beşiktaş were ahead of Sivasspor on head-to-head goal difference: Fenerbahçe: 12 pts; Beşiktaş: 3 pts, 5–7 (–2); Sivasspor: 3 pts, 4–8 (–4).)	Qualification to Champions League second qualifying round
3	Beşiktaş	34	23	4	7	58	32	+26	73	Qualification to UEFA Cup second qualifying round
4	Sivasspor	34	23	4	7	57	29	+28	73	Qualification to Intertoto Cup second round
5	Kayserispor	34	15	10	9	50	31	+19	55	Qualification to UEFA Cup first round (Note: Kayserispor have won the 2007–08 Turkish Cup competition and thus are qualified for the first round of the UEFA Cup.)

Rules for classification: 1) points; 2) goal difference; 3) number of goals scored.
(C) Champions

== Türkiye Kupası ==
=== Group stage ===
Pos	Team	Pld	W	D	L	GF	GA	GD	Pts
1	Gençlerbirliği OFTAŞ	4	3	0	1	9	2	+7	9
2	Galatasaray	4	2	1	1	7	6	+1	7
3	Bursaspor	4	1	2	1	5	5	0	5
4	Denizlispor	4	1	1	2	5	6	−1	4
5	Sarıyer G.K.	4	1	0	3	4	11	−7	3

1 November 2007 1	Galatasaray	4–0	Denizlispor	Istanbul
20:00 EET	Carrusca 40'; Song 76' (pen.)	(Report)	Hasan 74'	Stadium: Ali Sami Yen Stadı; Referee: Vedat Yüksel

5 January 2008 2	Bursaspor	2–2	Galatasaray	Bursa
19:00 EET	Volkan 84'; Tum 90'	(Report)	Mehmet T. 3'; Mehmet G. 87'	Stadium: Bursa Atatürk Stadı; Referee: Zafer Önder İpek

15 February 2008 3	Galatasaray	3–0	Sariyer	Istanbul
20:00 EET	Serkan Ç. 13'; Ümit 26'; Barış 81'	(Report)		Stadium: Ali Sami Yen Stadı; Referee: Süleyman Abay

15 February 2006 4	Gençlerbirliği OFTAŞ	3–0	Galatasaray	Ankara
19:00 EET	Serkan A. 22'; Mendonça 45', 87'	(Report)		Stadium: 19 Mayıs Stadı; Referee: Hakan Sivriservi

=== Quarter-final ===
3 February 2008 First leg	Fenerbahçe	0–0	Galatasaray	Istanbul
19:00 EET		(Report)		Stadium: Şükrü Saracoğlu Stadı; Referee: Fırat Aydınus

27 February 2008 Second leg	Galatasaray	2–1 (2–1 agg.)	Fenerbahçe	Istanbul
20:00 EET	Hakan Ş. 4'; Ümit 90'	(Report)	Gökhan 67'	Stadium: Ali Sami Yen Stadı; Referee: Cüneyt Çakır

=== Semi-final ===
19 March 2008 First leg	Gençlerbirliği	1–0	Galatasaray	Ankara
20:00 EET	Burhan 71'	(Report)		Stadium: 19 Mayıs Stadı; Referee: Halis Özkahya

15 April 2008 Second leg	Galatasaray	1–1 (1–2 agg.)	Gençlerbirliği	Istanbul
20:00 EET	Ümit 90'	(Report)	Tuna 76'	Stadium: Ali Sami Yen Stadı; Referee: Hüseyin Göçek

== UEFA Cup ==
=== Second qualifying round ===
16 August 2007 First leg	Slaven Koprivnica (Croatia)	1–2	(Turkey) Galatasaray	Koprivnica, Croatia
	Posavec 16' (pen.)	Report	Ayhan 42'; Volkan 72'	Stadium: Gradski Stadium; Referee: Stéphane Lannoy (France)

30 August 2007 Second leg	Galatasaray (Turkey)	2–1 (4–2 agg.)	(Croatia) Slaven Koprivnica	Istanbul, Turkey
	Ümit 9'; Hakan Ş. 37'	Report	Poljak 36'	Stadium: Ali Sami Yen Stadı; Referee: Nicola Rizzoli (Italy)

=== First round ===
20 September 2007 First leg	Sion (Switzerland)	3–2	(Turkey) Galatasaray	Geneva, Switzerland
	Dominguez 6'; Vanczák 9'; Song 31' (o.g.)	Report	Lincoln 38'; Linderoth 67'	Stadium: Stade de Genève; Referee: Carlos Megía Dávila (Spain)

4 October 2007 Second leg	Galatasaray (Turkey)	5–1 (8–4 agg.)	(Switzerland) Sion	Istanbul, Turkey
	Ümit 22', 28'; Lincoln 36'; Arda 68'; Bouzid 90'	Report	Nwaneri 90'	Stadium: Ali Sami Yen Stadı; Referee: Michael Weiner (Germany)

=== Group stage ===
Pos	Team	Pld	W	D	L	GF	GA	GD	Pts	Qualification	BDX	HEL	GAL	PAN	AUS
1	(France) Bordeaux	4	4	0	0	9	5	+4	12	Advance to knockout stage	—	2–1	2–1	—	—
2	(Sweden) Helsingborgs IF	4	2	1	1	8	5	+3	7	Advance to knockout stage	—	—	—	1–1	3–0
3	(Turkey) Galatasaray	4	1	1	2	6	5	+1	4	Advance to knockout stage	—	2–3	—	—	0–0
4	(Greece) Panionios	4	1	1	2	4	7	−3	4		2–3	—	0–3	—	—
5	Austria Wien	4	0	1	3	1	6	−5	1		1–2	—	—	0–1	—

25 October 2007 1	Bordeaux (France)	2–1	(Turkey) Galatasaray	Bordeaux, France
19:00 CET	Cavenaghi 53'; Chamakh 64'	Report	Nonda 22' (pen.)	Stadium: Stade Chaban-Delmas; Attendance: 10,863; Referee: Robert Małek (Poland)

8 November 2007 2	Galatasaray (Turkey)	2–3	(Sweden) Helsingborg	Istanbul, Turkey
19:00 CET	Nonda 45', 90'	Report	Larsson 31'; Omotoyossi 39'; C. Andersson 75'	Stadium: Ali Sami Yen Stadium; Attendance: 22,000; Referee: Mike Dean (England)

29 November 2007 3	Panionios (Greece)	0–3	(Turkey) Galatasaray	Athens, Greece
20:00 CET		Report	Serkan 50'; Song 63' (pen.); Hakan Ş. 82'	Stadium: Nea Smyrni Stadium; Attendance: 7,500; Referee: Alberto Undiano Mallenco (Spain)

19 December 2007 4	Galatasaray (Turkey)	0–0	Austria Wien	Istanbul, Turkey
20:45 CET		Report		Stadium: Ali Sami Yen Stadium; Attendance: 7,320; Referee: Ruud Bossen (Netherlands)

=== Round of 32 ===
13 February 2008 First leg	Galatasaray (Turkey)	0–0	(Germany) Bayer Leverkusen	Istanbul, Turkey
18:45 CET		Report		Stadium: Ali Sami Yen Stadium; Attendance: 20,006; Referee: Lucílio Batista (Portugal)

21 February 2008 Second leg	Bayer Leverkusen (Germany)	5–1	(Turkey) Galatasaray	Leverkusen, Germany
17:00 CET	Barbarez 12', 22'; Kießling 13'; Haggui 55'; Schneider 61' (pen.)	Report	Barusso 87' (pen.)	Stadium: BayArena; Attendance: 22,500; Referee: Damir Skomina (Slovenia)

== Attendance ==
Competition	Av. Att.	Total Att.
Süper Lig	-	-
Türkiye Kupası	-	-
UEFA Cup		-
Total	-	-
