= Bolton Wanderers F.C. in European football =

English club in European football

- Club: Bolton Wanderers
- Seasons played: 2
- Most appearances: Stelios Giannakopoulos (14)
- Top scorer: Jared Borgetti (2); El Hadji Diouf (2); Stelios Giannakopoulos (2); Gavin McCann (2); Kevin Nolan (2)
- First entry: 2005–06 UEFA Cup
- Latest entry: 2007–08 UEFA Cup

Bolton Wanderers is an English professional football club based in bolton, Greater Manchester. The club has competed twice in UEFA competitions in its history, with its first entry coming in the 2005–06 UEFA Cup. Additionally, the club has also participated in the minor Anglo-Scottish Cup and Anglo-Italian Cup on a number of occasions.

== History ==
=== 2005–06 UEFA Cup ===
Bolton's sixth-place finish in the 2004–05 FA Premier League led to the club gaining European qualification for the first time in its history. Going into the 2005–06 UEFA Cup, the club successfully negotiated the group stage, but were eliminated in the Round of 32 by former European champions Marseille.

Season	Competition	Round	Opposition	Home	Attendance	Away	Attendance	Aggregate
2005–06	UEFA Cup	First round	(Bulgaria) Lokomitv Plovdiv	2–1	19,723	2–1	8,340	4–2
2005–06	UEFA Cup	Group H	(Turkey) Beşiktaş	—N/a	—N/a	1–1	17,027	3rd
2005–06	UEFA Cup	Group H	(Russia) Zenit St. Petersburg	1–0	15,095	—N/a	—N/a	3rd
2005–06	UEFA Cup	Group H	(Portugal) Vitória de Guimarães	—N/a	—N/a	1–1	10,230	3rd
2005–06	UEFA Cup	Group H	(Spain) Sevilla	1–1	15,623	—N/a	—N/a	3rd
2005–06	UEFA Cup	Round of 32	(France) Marseille	0–0	19,288	1–2	38,351	1–2

=== 2007–08 UEFA Cup ===
Bolton returned to European competition thanks to a seventh-placed finish in the 2006–07 FA Premier League season, once again gaining a place in the UEFA Cup. Again, the club was able to reach the latter stages of the competition, along the way beating former European champions Red Star Belgrade and gaining a creditable draw against German giants Bayern Munich. The club subsequently reached the Round of 16 by beating Spanish side Atlético Madrid, before ultimately falling to Sporting CP.

Season	Competition	Round	Opposition	Home	Attendance	Away	Attendance	Aggregate
2007–08	UEFA Cup	First round	(North Macedonia) Rabotnicki	1–1	8,500	1–0	18,932	2–1
2007–08	UEFA Cup	Group F	(Portugal) Braga	1–1	10,848	—N/a	—N/a	3rd
2007–08	UEFA Cup	Group F	(Germany) Bayern Munich	—N/a	—N/a	2–2	66,000	3rd
2007–08	UEFA Cup	Group F	(Greece) Aris	1–1	10,229	—N/a	—N/a	3rd
2007–08	UEFA Cup	Group F	(Serbia) Red Star Belgrade	—N/a	—N/a	1–0	30,689	3rd
2007–08	UEFA Cup	Round of 32	(Spain) Atlético Madrid	1–0	26,163	0–0	27,590	1–0
2007–08	UEFA Cup	Round of 16	(Portugal) Sporting CP	1–1	25,664	0–1	22,031	1–2

== Overall record in UEFA competitions ==
=== Record by competition ===
Competition	Pld	W	D	L	GF	GA	GD	Best performance
UEFA Cup	18	6	10	2	18	14	+4	Round of 16 (2007–08)

=== Record by nation ===
Nation	Pld	W	D	L	GF	GA	GD	Opponents
Bulgaria	2	2	0	0	4	2	+2	Lokomotiv Plovdiv
France	2	0	1	1	1	2	-1	Marseille
Germany	1	0	1	0	2	2	0	Bayern Munich
Greece	1	0	1	0	1	1	0	Aris
North Macedonia	2	1	1	0	2	1	+1	Rabotnicki
Portugal	4	0	3	1	3	4	-1	Vitória de Guimarães, Braga, Sporting CP
Russia	1	1	0	0	1	0	+1	Zenit St. Petersburg
Serbia	1	1	0	0	1	0	+1	Red Star Belgrade
Spain	3	1	2	0	2	1	+1	Sevilla, Atlético Madrid
Turkey	1	0	1	0	1	1	0	Beşiktaş

=== Record by match ===
Season	Competition	Round	Opposition	Home	Away	Aggregate
2005–06	UEFA Cup	First round	(Bulgaria) Lokomitv Plovdiv	2–1	2–1	4–2
2005–06	UEFA Cup	Group H	(Turkey) Beşiktaş	—N/a	1–1	3rd
2005–06	UEFA Cup	Group H	(Russia) Zenit St. Petersburg	1–0	—N/a	3rd
2005–06	UEFA Cup	Group H	(Portugal) Vitória de Guimarães	—N/a	1–1	3rd
2005–06	UEFA Cup	Group H	(Spain) Sevilla	1–1	—N/a	3rd
2005–06	UEFA Cup	Round of 32	(France) Marseille	0–0	1–2	1–2
2007–08	UEFA Cup	First round	(North Macedonia) Rabotnicki	1–1	1–0	2–1
2007–08	UEFA Cup	Group F	(Portugal) Braga	1–1	—N/a	3rd
2007–08	UEFA Cup	Group F	(Germany) Bayern Munich	—N/a	2–2	3rd
2007–08	UEFA Cup	Group F	(Greece) Aris	1–1	—N/a	3rd
2007–08	UEFA Cup	Group F	(Serbia) Red Star Belgrade	—N/a	1–0	3rd
2007–08	UEFA Cup	Round of 32	(Spain) Atlético Madrid	1–0	0–0	1–0
2007–08	UEFA Cup	Round of 16	(Portugal) Sporting CP	1–1	0–1	1–2

== All-time goalscorers in UEFA competitions ==
The following is a list of Bolton's goalscorers in official UEFA competitions:

Rank	Player	UEFA Cup	Total
=1	(Mexico) Jared Borgetti	2	2
=1	(Senegal) El Hadji Diouf	2	2
=1	(Greece) Stelios Giannakopoulos	2	2
=1	(England) Gavin McCann	2	2
=1	(England) Kevin Nolan	2	2
=6	(France) Nicolas Anelka	1	1
=6	(England) Kevin Davies	1	1
=6	(Jamaica) Ricardo Gardner	1	1
=6	(Ivory Coast) Abdoulaye Méïté	1	1
=6	(Portugal) Ricardo Vaz Tê	1	1

== Non-UEFA competitions ==
Competition	Season	Round	Opposition	Home	Away	Aggregate
Anglo-Scottish Cup	1976–77	Group A	(England) Blackpool	0–0	—N/a	1st
Anglo-Scottish Cup	1976–77	Group A	(England) Blackburn Rovers	2–0	—N/a	1st
Anglo-Scottish Cup	1976–77	Group A	(England) Burnley	—N/a	0–1	1st
Anglo-Scottish Cup	1976–77	Quarter-final	(Scotland) Partick Thistle	0–0	0–1	0–1
Anglo-Scottish Cup	1977–78	Group A	(England) Burnley	1–0	—N/a	2nd
Anglo-Scottish Cup	1977–78	Group A	(England) Blackburn Rovers	—N/a	0–2	2nd
Anglo-Scottish Cup	1977–78	Group A	(England) Blackpool	—N/a	1–0	2nd
Anglo-Scottish Cup	1978–79	Group B	(England) Sunderland	—N/a	0–2	2nd
Anglo-Scottish Cup	1978–79	Group B	(England) Sheffield United	1–0	—N/a	2nd
Anglo-Scottish Cup	1978–79	Group B	(England) Oldham Athletic	0–0	—N/a	2nd
Anglo-Italian Cup	1993–94	Preliminary Group 1	(England) Tranmere Rovers	—N/a	2–1	1st
Anglo-Italian Cup	1993–94	Preliminary Group 1	(England) Sunderland	2–0	—N/a	1st
Anglo-Italian Cup	1993–94	Group A	(Italy) Ancona	5–0	—N/a	5th
Anglo-Italian Cup	1993–94	Group A	(Italy) Brescia	3–3	—N/a	5th
Anglo-Italian Cup	1993–94	Group A	(Italy) Pisa	—N/a	1–1	5th
Anglo-Italian Cup	1993–94	Group A	(Italy) Ascoli	—N/a	1–1	5th
