= 2007–08 Tottenham Hotspur F.C. season =

English football club season

Tottenham Hotspur F.C.
2007–08 season
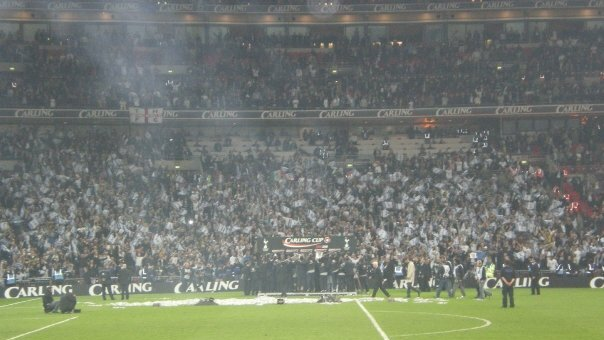
- Tottenham Hotspur players and fans celebrating their win the 2008 Football League Cup Final
- Chairman: Daniel Levy
- Manager: Martin Jol (until 25 October); Juande Ramos (from 27 October)
- Premier League: 11th
- FA Cup: Fourth round
- League Cup: Winners
- UEFA Cup: Round of 16
- Top goalscorer: League: Dimitar Berbatov and Robbie Keane (15); All: Dimitar Berbatov and Robbie Keane (23)
- Highest home attendance: 36,178 (vs. Chelsea, 19 March 2008)
- Lowest home attendance: 35,504 (vs. Wigan Athletic, 11 November 2007)
Home colours	Away colours	Third colours

The 2007–08 season was the 126th season in the history of Tottenham Hotspur Football Club, their 30th consecutive season in the top flight of English football and their 16th consecutive season in the FA Premier League. The club also participated in the FA Cup, Football League Cup and UEFA Cup.

Spurs had finished fifth in the previous season's Premier League, thereby qualifying for the UEFA Cup. They then progressed to the last 16 of the competition to face PSV. After the two rounds and one away goal each, Spurs were finally eliminated 6–5 on penalties.

In the FA Cup, Spurs were eliminated by Manchester United in the fourth round, losing 3–1. This was also the season where Tottenham won the League Cup, beating Chelsea 2–1 at Wembley Stadium. Their victory was the team's last official trophy until the 2025 UEFA Europa League Final.

== Pre-season and friendlies ==
During the 2007 summer transfer period Tottenham added centre-back Younès Kaboul from Auxerre for £8 million, followed by striker Darren Bent for a club record fee of £16.5 million. This was also the season that Spurs acquired Gareth Bale from Southampton for £5 million. Additional signings included Danny Rose from Leeds United and Kevin-Prince Boateng from Hertha BSC.

Departing the club was Egyptian footballer Mido. He initially arrived on an 18-month loan deal from Roma in January 2005 and in 2006 signed a permanent deal; on 16 August 2007, he was sold to Middlesbrough for £6 million. Also departing was Reto Ziegler, who was loaned out to Sampdoria in Italy for the second half of the 2006–07 season. Sampdoria subsequently signed him permanently from Spurs for an undisclosed fee.

=== Friendlies ===
Date	Opponents	H / A	Result	Scorers	Attendance
7 July 2007	Stevenage	A	1 – 3	Keane 17′ (pen.), Bent 46′, Taarabt 62′	Not reported
12 July 2007	St Patricks	A	0 – 1	Keane 42′	Not reported
21 July 2007	Kaizer Chiefs	A	1 – 2	Keane 39′, Berbatov 62′	Not reported
24 July 2007	Orlando Pirates	A	1 – 2	Bent 12′, Routledge 69′	30,000
28 July 2007	Orlando Pirates	A	0 – 3	Bent 10′, 22′, Berbatov 18′	30,000
1 August 2007	Leyton Orient	A	2 – 4	Keane 18′, 56′, Defoe 60′, Bent 65′	9,126
4 August 2007	Torino	H	2 – 0	Keane 15′, Berbatov 64′	30,823

== 2007–08 season ==
Tottenham started off their Premier League campaign away at promoted Sunderland with a 1–0 loss. Three days later they travelled to Everton, losing 3–1, then back at White Hart Lane recorded their first win, 4–0 against Derby County. After that Tottenham recorded four draws and three defeats in the Premier League, which included a 3–3 draw away to Fulham and a 4–4 draw against Aston Villa. In the UEFA Cup first round Spurs won 6–1 against Cypriot club Anorthosis, then followed up with a 1–1 draw away in Cyprus. Manager Martin Jol's final Premier League game was on 22 October, a 3–1 away loss at Newcastle United. On 25 October, in the UEFA Cup, Spurs hosted Getafe, losing 2–1. Following the match, it was announced that Jol had been sacked.

After one match with Clive Allen and Alex Inglethorpe in charge, Juande Ramos was hired as Jol's replacement, having previously managed Sevilla. Alongside Ramos, Gus Poyet was handed the assistant head coaching role. Marcos Álvarez, who worked alongside Ramos at Sevilla, also joined the backroom staff, as fitness coach. Tottenham chairman Daniel Levy was widely criticised for his treatment of Jol following revelations that Ramos was approached to replace Jol during the summer, which many thought undermined his leadership and ruined his credibility as an authoritative figure.

Ramos' reign began with a 2–0 win over Blackpool in the League Cup. Immediately following Ramos' appointment, it was made clear in the public forum that he was very unhappy with the fitness of the team and instigated a new diet and fitness regime. Tottenham's league form began to improve and their progress in the League Cup began with a 2–0 win over Manchester City, which ended City's unbeaten home record.

On 27 January 2008, Spurs went out of the FA Cup in the fourth round to a 3–1 defeat at the hands of Manchester United at Old Trafford. Tottenham took the lead through Robbie Keane but eventually lost to United to a goal from Carlos Tevez and two goals from Cristiano Ronaldo, one of which was a penalty where Michael Dawson was sent off for a deliberate handball.

Tottenham's run in the League Cup continued with a semi-final first leg 1–1 draw against Arsenal at Emirates Stadium; a 5–1 win over Arsenal at White Hart Lane followed, resulting in a 6–2 Spurs aggregate victory. This booked a place in the final against Chelsea. Tottenham went on to win the match 2–1 thanks to a Jonathan Woodgate header in extra time, securing Tottenham's first trophy since 1999. It also guaranteed them UEFA Cup qualification for the third season running.

On 13 March 2008, Tottenham were eliminated from the UEFA Cup in the last 16 round by PSV. The first leg played at White Hart Lane was a 1–0 defeat for Spurs following a mistake from Gilberto. Dimitar Berbatov scored in the second leg away at the Philips Stadion to take the game to extra time and subsequently penalties. Here, Tottenham lost 6–5 when Pascal Chimbonda missed his kick.

On 22 March 2008, Spurs played Portsmouth, winning 2–0. Darren Bent struck the 100th goal of the 2007–08 Premier League campaign. Jamie O'Hara followed two minutes later with the club's 101st. BBC sport writer Ian Hughes noted that Tottenham have "an average of 3.63 goals in every Spurs game this season".

After earning a point on 19 April in a 1–1 draw against Wigan Athletic, Tottenham secured their safety in the Premier League after reaching 42 points. Berbatov's sixth-minute strike was Tottenham's 100th in all competitions that season, 64 in the Premier League and 36 in cup competitions. The season ended on 11 May 2008 with a 2–0 home defeat to Liverpool.

== Premier League table ==
Pos	Team	Pld	W	D	L	GF	GA	GD	Pts	Qualification or relegation
9	Manchester City	38	15	10	13	45	53	−8	55	Qualification for the UEFA Cup first qualifying round (Note: Manchester City qualified as the highest-ranked team not already qualified for European competitions of Premier League Fair Play Ranking by The Football Association, the top association among UEFA Fair Play ranking winners.)
10	West Ham United	38	13	10	15	42	50	−8	49	
11	Tottenham Hotspur	38	11	13	14	66	61	+5	46	Qualification for the UEFA Cup first round (Note: As League Cup winners)
12	Newcastle United	38	11	10	17	45	65	−20	43	
13	Middlesbrough	38	10	12	16	43	53	−10	42	

Source: Barclays Premier League
Rules for classification: 1) points; 2) goal difference; 3) number of goals scored.
For further information on European qualification see Premier League – Competition

== Season honours ==
League Cup: 2007–08

== Team kit ==
The team kit for the 2007–08 season was produced by Puma. The main shirt sponsor was Mansion, an Internet gambling establishment. A special 125th anniversary commemorative kit was produced for a match against Aston Villa.

Home Kit	Away kit	Third kit	125 year anniversary kit	Alternate kit

== Transfers ==
=== In ===
Date	Player	Previous club	Cost
25 May 2007	(Wales) Gareth Bale	(England) Southampton	£5.8 million
29 June 2007	(England) Darren Bent	(England) Charlton Athletic	£16.5 million
5 July 2007	(France) Younès Kaboul	(France) Auxerre	£8 million
25 July 2007	(England) Danny Rose	(England) Leeds	Free
31 July 2007	(Germany) Kevin-Prince Boateng	(Germany) Hertha Berlin	£5.4 million
1 January 2008	(Wales) Chris Gunter	(Wales) Cardiff City	£3 million
28 January 2008	(England) Jonathan Woodgate	(England) Middlesbrough	£8 million
30 January 2008	(Scotland) Alan Hutton	(Scotland) Rangers	£9 million
31 January 2008	(Brazil) Gilberto	(Germany) Hertha Berlin	£1.9 million
			Total
			£57.5 million

=== Out ===
Date	Player	New Club	Cost
3 July 2007	(Switzerland) Reto Ziegler	(Italy) Sampdoria	Undisclosed.
3 July 2007	(Republic of Ireland) Mark Yeates	(England) Colchester United	Undisclosed.
5 July 2007	(Iceland) Emil Hallfreðsson	(Norway) Lyn Oslo	Undisclosed.
16 August 2007	(Egypt) Mido	(England) Middlesbrough	£6 million.
10 January 2008	(England) Philip Ifil	(England) Colchester United	Undisclosed.
25 January 2008	(England) Lee Barnard	(England) Southend United	Undisclosed.
30 January 2008	(England) Wayne Routledge	(England) Aston Villa	£1.5 million.
30 January 2008	(England) Jermain Defoe	(England) Portsmouth	£7 million.
			Total
			£14.5 million

=== Loaned out ===
Date	Player	Club	Loan Length
31 August 2007	(England) Danny Murphy	(England) Fulham	End of season
15 January 2008	(England) Andy Barcham	(England) Leyton Orient	End of season
7 January 2008	(England) Ben Alnwick	(England) Leicester City	End of season
11 January 2008	(Egypt) Hossam Ghaly	(England) Derby County	End of 2007–08 season
30 January 2008	(Canada) Paul Stalteri	(England) Fulham	End of 2007–08 season
31 January 2008	(England) Anthony Gardner	(England) Everton	End of 2007–08 season
29 February 2008	(England) Jake Livermore	(England) Milton Keynes Dons	1 month

== Squad list ==
Note: Flags indicate national team as defined under FIFA eligibility rules; some limited exceptions apply. Players may hold more than one non-FIFA nationality.

No.	Pos.	Nation	Player
1	GK	ENG	Paul Robinson
2	DF	FRA	Pascal Chimbonda
3	DF	KOR	Lee Young-pyo
4	MF	CIV	Didier Zokora
5	DF	FRA	Younès Kaboul
6	MF	FIN	Teemu Tainio
8	MF	ENG	Jermaine Jenas
9	FW	BUL	Dimitar Berbatov
10	FW	IRL	Robbie Keane (team captain)
11	DF	BRA	Gilberto
12	GK	CZE	Radek Černý (on loan from Slavia Prague)
15	MF	FRA	Steed Malbranque
16	DF	WAL	Gareth Bale
17	MF	GER	Kevin-Prince Boateng
19	MF	FRA	Adel Taarabt
20	DF	ENG	Michael Dawson

No.	Pos.	Nation	Player
22	MF	ENG	Tom Huddlestone
23	FW	ENG	Darren Bent
24	MF	ENG	Jamie O'Hara
25	MF	ENG	Aaron Lennon
26	DF	ENG	Ledley King (club captain)
28	DF	SCO	Alan Hutton
31	GK	ENG	Tommy Forecast
32	DF	CMR	Benoît Assou-Ekotto
33	DF	POR	Ricardo Rocha
34	FW	ENG	Andy Barcham
35	DF	FRA	Dorian Dervite
36	FW	ENG	Simon Dawkins
37	MF	ENG	Danny Rose
38	DF	ENG	Troy Archibald-Henville
39	DF	ENG	Jonathan Woodgate
44	DF	WAL	Chris Gunter

== Injury list ==
Date	Player	Injury	Return date
January 2007	(France) Dorian Dervite	Knee injury	4 December 2007
14 June 2007	(England) Ledley King	Knee Surgery	4 December 2007
5 October 2007	(Portugal) Ricardo Rocha	Ankle injury	4 December 2007
30 November 2007	(Cameroon) Benoît Assou-Ekotto	Knee Surgery	Start of 2008–09 season
10 December 2007	(Wales) Gareth Bale	Ankle Ligament damage.	Start of 2008–09 season
3 April 2008	(England) Ledley King	Knee Rehabilitation	Start of 2008–09 season.
April 2008	(England) Jonathan Woodgate
April 2008	(France) Pascal Chimbonda
May 2008	(Bulgaria) Dimitar Berbatov	Groin injury	Start of 2008–09 season.

== Match results ==
=== Premier League ===
==== Results summary ====
Overall								Home						Away					
Pld	W	D	L	GF	GA	GD	Pts	W	D	L	GF	GA	GD	W	D	L	GF	GA	GD
38	11	13	14	66	61	+5	46	8	5	6	46	34	+12	3	8	8	20	27	−7

==== Results per matchday ====
Matchday	1	2	3	4	5	6	7	8	9	10	11	12	13	14	15	16	17	18	19	20	21	22	23	24	25	26	27	28	29	30	31	32	33	34	35	36	37	38
Ground	A	H	H	A	A	H	A	H	A	A	H	A	H	A	H	H	A	A	H	H	A	A	H	A	H	A	A	H	A	H	H	H	A	H	A	H	A	H
ResultA	L	L	W	L	D	L	D	D	D	L	L	D	W	D	L	W	W	L	W	W	L	L	W	D	D	W	L	W	L	D	W	L	D	D	D	D	W	L
Position	18	20	9	17	13	17	18	18	17	18	18	17	14	14	16	13	12	13	13	12	12	12	11	11	11	11	11	11	11	11	11	11	11	11	11	11	11	11

A = Away; H = Home; W = Win; D = Draw; L = Loss

Date	Opponents	H / A	Result	Spurs scorers	Attendance
11 August 2007	Sunderland	A	1 – 0		43,967
14 August 2007	Everton	H	1 – 3	Gardner 26′	35,716
18 August 2007	Derby County	H	4 – 0	Malbranque 1′, 6′, Jenas 14′, Bent 80′	35,600
26 August 2007	Manchester United	A	1 – 0		75,696
1 September 2007	Fulham	A	3 – 3	Kaboul 10′, Berbatov 28′, Bale 61′	24,007
15 September 2007	Arsenal	H	1 – 3	Bale 14′	36,053
23 September 2007	Bolton Wanderers	A	1 – 1	Keane 34′	20,308
1 October 2007	Aston Villa	H	4 – 4	Berbatov 19′, Chimbonda 68′, Keane 80′ (pen.), Kaboul 90+3′,	36,094
7 October 2007	Liverpool	A	2 – 2	Keane 44′, 46′	43,986
22 October 2007	Newcastle United	A	3 – 1	Keane 56′	51,411
28 October 2007	Blackburn Rovers	H	1 – 2	Keane 47′ (pen.)	36,086
3 November 2007	Middlesbrough	A	1 – 1	Bent 35′	25,625
11 November 2007	Wigan Athletic	H	4 – 0	Jenas 13′, 26′, Lennon 34′, Bent 72′	35,504
25 November 2007	West Ham	A	1 – 1	Dawson 67′	34,966
2 December 2007	Birmingham City	H	2 – 3	Keane 50′ (pen.), 53′	35,635
9 December 2007	Manchester City	H	2 – 1	Chimbonda 45′, Defoe 82′	35,646
15 December 2007	Portsmouth	A	0 – 1	Berbatov 81′	20,520
22 December 2007	Arsenal	A	2 – 1	Berbatov 66′	60,087
26 December 2007	Fulham	H	5 – 1	Keane 27′, 62′, Huddlestone 45′ 71′, Defoe 90′	36,077
29 December 2007	Reading	H	6 – 4	Berbatov 7′, 63′, 73′, 83′, Malbranque 76′, Defoe 79′	36,178
1 January 2008	Aston Villa	A	2 – 1	Defoe 79′	41,609
12 January 2008	Chelsea	A	2 – 0		41,777
19 January 2008	Sunderland	H	2 – 0	Lennon 2′, Keane 90′	36,070
30 January 2008	Everton	A	0 – 0		35,840
2 February 2008	Manchester United	H	1 – 1	Berbatov 21′	36,075
9 February 2008	Derby County	A	0 – 3	Keane 68′, Kaboul 81′, Berbatov 90′ (pen.)	33,058
1 March 2008	Birmingham City	A	4 – 1	Jenas 89′	26,055
9 March 2008	West Ham	H	4 – 0	Berbatov 8′, 11′, Gilberto 85′, Bent 90′	36,062
16 March 2008	Manchester City	A	2 – 1	Keane 32′	40,188
19 March 2008	Chelsea	H	4 – 4	Woodgate 12′, Berbatov 61′, Huddlestone 75′, Keane 88′	36,178
22 March 2008	Portsmouth	H	2 – 0	Bent 80′, O'Hara 82′	35,998
30 March 2008	Newcastle	H	1 – 4	Bent 26′	36,067
5 April 2008	Blackburn	A	1 – 1	Berbatov 7′	24,592
12 April 2008	Middlesbrough	H	1 – 1	Grounds 27′ (o.g.)	36,092
19 April 2008	Wigan Athletic	A	1 – 1	Berbatov 6′	18,673
26 April 2008	Bolton Wanderers	H	1 – 1	Malbranque 52′	36,176
3 May 2008	Reading	A	0 – 1	Keane 16′	24,125
11 May 2008	Liverpool	H	0 – 2		36,063

H/A = Home/Away Final updated: 11 May 2008

=== FA Cup ===
Round	Date	Opponents	H / A	Result	Scorers	Attendance
3	5 January 2008	Reading	H	2 - 2	Berbatov 28′, 48′ (pen.)	35,243
3R	15 January 2008	Reading	A	0 - 1	Keane 15′	22,130
4	27 January 2008	Manchester United	A	3 - 1	Keane 24′	75,369

Eliminated

H/A = Home/Away

Final update: 27 February 2008

- Tottenham v Chelsea League Cup Final line-up.

=== League Cup ===
Round	Date	Opponents	H / A	Result	Scorers	Attendance
3	26 September 2007	Middlesbrough	H	2 - 0	Bale 71′, Huddlestone 74′	30,084
4	31 October 2007	Blackpool	H	2 - 0	Keane 17′, Chimbonda 55′	32,196
QF	18 December 2007	Manchester City	A	0 - 2	Defoe 4′, Malbranque 82′	38,564
SF L1	9 January 2008	Arsenal	A	1 - 1	Jenas 37′	53,163
SF L2	22 January 2008	Arsenal	H	5 - 1	Jenas 3′, Bendtner 27′ (o.g.), Keane 48′, Lennon 60′, Malbranque 90+4′	35,979
F	24 February 2008	Chelsea	N	1 - 2 (a.e.t)	Berbatov 70′ (pen.), Woodgate 94′	87,660

Champions

H/A = Home/Away

Final update: 27 February 2008

=== UEFA Cup ===
==== First round and group stage ====
Round	Date	Opponents	H / A	Result	Scorers	Attendance
FR	20 September 2007	Anorthosis	H	6 - 1	Kaboul 5′, Dawson 40′, Keane 42′, Bent 43′, Defoe 65′, 90′	35,780
FR	4 October 2007	Anorthosis	A	1 - 1	Keane 78′	8,000
G	25 October 2007	Getafe	H	1 - 2	Defoe 19′	36,240
G	8 November 2007	Hapoel Tel Aviv	A	0 - 2	Keane 26′, Berbatov 31′	8,000
G	29 November 2007	Aalborg BK	H	3 - 2	Berbatov 45′, Malbranque 51′, Bent 66′	29,758
G	6 December 2007	Anderlecht	A	1 - 1	Berbatov 71′ (pen.)	22,500

==== Group G final standings ====
Pos	Team	Pld	W	D	L	GF	GA	GD	Pts	Qualification	GET	TOT	AND	AAB	HTA
1	(Spain) Getafe	4	3	0	1	7	5	+2	9	Advance to knockout stage	—	—	2–1	—	1–2
2	(England) Tottenham Hotspur	4	2	1	1	7	5	+2	7	Advance to knockout stage	1–2	—	—	3–2	—
3	(Belgium) Anderlecht	4	1	2	1	5	4	+1	5	Advance to knockout stage	—	1–1	—	—	2–0
4	(Denmark) AaB	4	1	1	2	7	7	0	4		1–2	—	1–1	—	—
5	(Israel) Hapoel Tel Aviv	4	1	0	3	3	8	−5	3		—	0–2	—	1–3	—

==== Knockout rounds ====
Round	Date	Opponents	H / A	Result	Scorers	Attendance
L32	14 February 2008	Slavia Prague	A	1 - 2	Berbatov 4′, Keane 30′	11,134
L32	21 February 2008	Slavia Prague	H	1 - 1	O'Hara 7′	34,224
L16	6 March 2008	PSV	H	0 - 1		33,259
L16	12 March 2008	PSV	A	0 - 1	Berbatov 81′	33,000
	12 March 2008	PSV		6–5	Penalties

Eliminated

H/A = Home/Away

Final update: 13 March 2008

== Statistics ==
=== Appearances ===
Last updated: 26 July 2020.
Source: premierleague.com

No.	Pos.	Name	Premier League		FA Cup		League Cup		UEFA Cup		Total	
No.	Pos.	Name	Apps	Goals	Apps	Goals	Apps	Goals	Apps	Goals	Apps	Goals
Goalkeepers
1	GK	(England) Paul Robinson	25	0	1	0	4	0	7	0	37	0
12	GK	(Czech Republic) Radek Černý	13	0	2	0	2	0	3	0	20	0
Defenders
2	DF	(France) Pascal Chimbonda	31+1	2	2	0	6	1	9	0	48+1	3
3	DF	(South Korea) Lee Young-Pyo	17+1	0	2	0	4	0	6	0	29+1	0
5	DF	(France) Younes Kaboul	19+2	3	1	0	3+1	0	3	1	26+3	4
7	DF	(Canada) Paul Stalteri	3	0	0+1	0	0	0	2+1	0	5+2	0
20	DF	(England) Michael Dawson	26+1	1	3	0	4	0	5+1	1	38+2	2
26	DF	(England) Ledley King	4	0	1	0	3	0	2	0	10	0
28	DF	(Scotland) Alan Hutton	14	0	0	0	1	0	0	0	15	0
30	DF	(England) Anthony Gardner	4	1	0	0	0	0	2	0	6	1
32	DF	(Cameroon) Benoît Assou-Ekotto	1	0	0	0	0	0	1	0	2	0
33	DF	(Portugal) Ricardo Rocha	4+1	0	0	0	0	0	0	0	4+1	0
39	DF	(England) Jonathan Woodgate	12	1	0	0	1	1	4	0	17	2
44	DF	(Wales) Chris Gunter	1+1	0	1+1	0	0	0	0	0	2+2	0
Midfielders
4	MF	(Ivory Coast) Didier Zokora	25+3	0	1	0	3+1	0	10	0	39+4	0
6	MF	(Finland) Teemu Tainio	6+10	0	2	0	2+3	0	2+1	0	12+14	0
8	MF	(England) Jermaine Jenas	28+1	4	3	0	6	2	6+1	0	43+2	6
11	MF	(Brazil) Gilberto	3+3	1	0	0	0	0	1	0	4+3	1
15	MF	(France) Steed Malbranque	35+2	4	3	0	5	2	9+1	1	52+3	7
16	MF	(Wales) Gareth Bale	8	2	0	0	1	1	1+2	0	10+2	3
17	MF	(Ghana) Kevin-Prince Boateng	7+6	0	1+1	0	1+2	0	1+2	0	10+11	0
19	MF	(Morocco) Adel Taarabt	0+6	0	0+1	0	0	0	0+3	0	0+10	0
22	MF	(England) Tom Huddlestone	18+10	3	1+1	0	1+3	1	7+2	0	27+16	4
24	MF	(England) Jamie O'Hara	9+8	1	1+1	0	1+1	0	1+3	1	12+13	2
25	MF	(England) Aaron Lennon	25+4	2	2+1	0	6	1	8+1	0	41+6	3
Forwards
9	FW	(Bulgaria) Dimitar Berbatov	33+3	15	2	2	6	1	7+1	5	48+4	23
10	FW	(Republic of Ireland) Robbie Keane	32+4	15	3	2	4+1	2	7+3	4	46+8	23
23	FW	(England) Darren Bent	11+16	6	0	0	0+1	0	4+4	2	15+21	8
Players transferred out during the season
18	FW	(England) Jermain Defoe	3+16	4	1+1	0	2+3	1	2+3	3	8+23	8
21	MF	(England) Wayne Routledge	1+1	0	0	0	0	0	0	0	1+1	0

=== Goal scorers ===
Last updated: 26 July 2020.
Source: premierleague.com

The list is sorted by shirt number when total goals are equal.

Rnk	Pos	No.	Player	Premier League	FA Cup	League Cup	UEFA Cup	Total
1	FW	9	(Bulgaria) Dimitar Berbatov	15	2	1	5	23
1	FW	10	(Republic of Ireland) Robbie Keane	15	2	2	4	23
3	FW	18	(England) Jermain Defoe	4	0	1	3	8
3	FW	23	(England) Darren Bent	6	0	0	2	8
5	MF	15	(France) Steed Malbranque	4	0	2	1	7
6	MF	8	(England) Jermaine Jenas	4	0	2	0	6
7	DF	5	(France) Younes Kaboul	3	0	0	1	4
7	MF	6	(England) Tom Huddlestone	3	0	1	0	4
9	DF	2	(France) Pascal Chimbonda	2	0	1	0	3
9	MF	16	(Wales) Gareth Bale	2	0	1	0	3
9	MF	25	(England) Aaron Lennon	2	0	1	0	3
12	DF	20	(England) Michael Dawson	1	0	0	1	2
12	MF	24	(England) Jamie O'Hara	1	0	0	1	2
12	DF	39	(England) Jonathan Woodgate	1	0	1	0	2
15	MF	11	(Brazil) Gilberto	1	0	0	0	1
15	DF	30	(England) Anthony Gardner	1	0	0	0	1
TOTALS				65	4	13	18	100

=== Clean sheets ===
Last updated: 26 July 2020.
Source: premierleague.com

The list is sorted by shirt number when total clean sheets are equal.

Rnk	No.	Player	Premier League	FA Cup	League Cup	UEFA Cup	Total
1	1	(England) Paul Robinson	5	0	3	2	10
2	12	(Czech Republic) Radek Černý	4	1	0	0	5
TOTALS			9	1	3	2	15

== Head coach statistics ==
Stats correct as of the end of the season

Manager	Pld	Won (Note: Win/Draw/Loss % based on all competitions)	Drawn	Lost	Home Win %	Away Win %	Lge Pos	Lge Pts	PPLG	Lge Cup	FA Cup	Europe
Ramos	42	19 (45.2%)	13 (31.0%)	10 (23.8%)	50.0%	40.9%	11th	39	1.44			
Jol	14	3 (21.4%)	5 (35.7%)	6 (42.9%)	50.0%	0.0%	18th	7	0.70			
All (Note: Includes one game after Jol had departed and prior to the appointment of Ramos)	57	22 (38.6%)	18 (31.6%)	17 (29.8%)	48.2%	30.0%	11th	46	1.21	Winners	KO (4th Rd)	KO (Last 16)
