= Gavin McCann =

English footballer (born 1978)

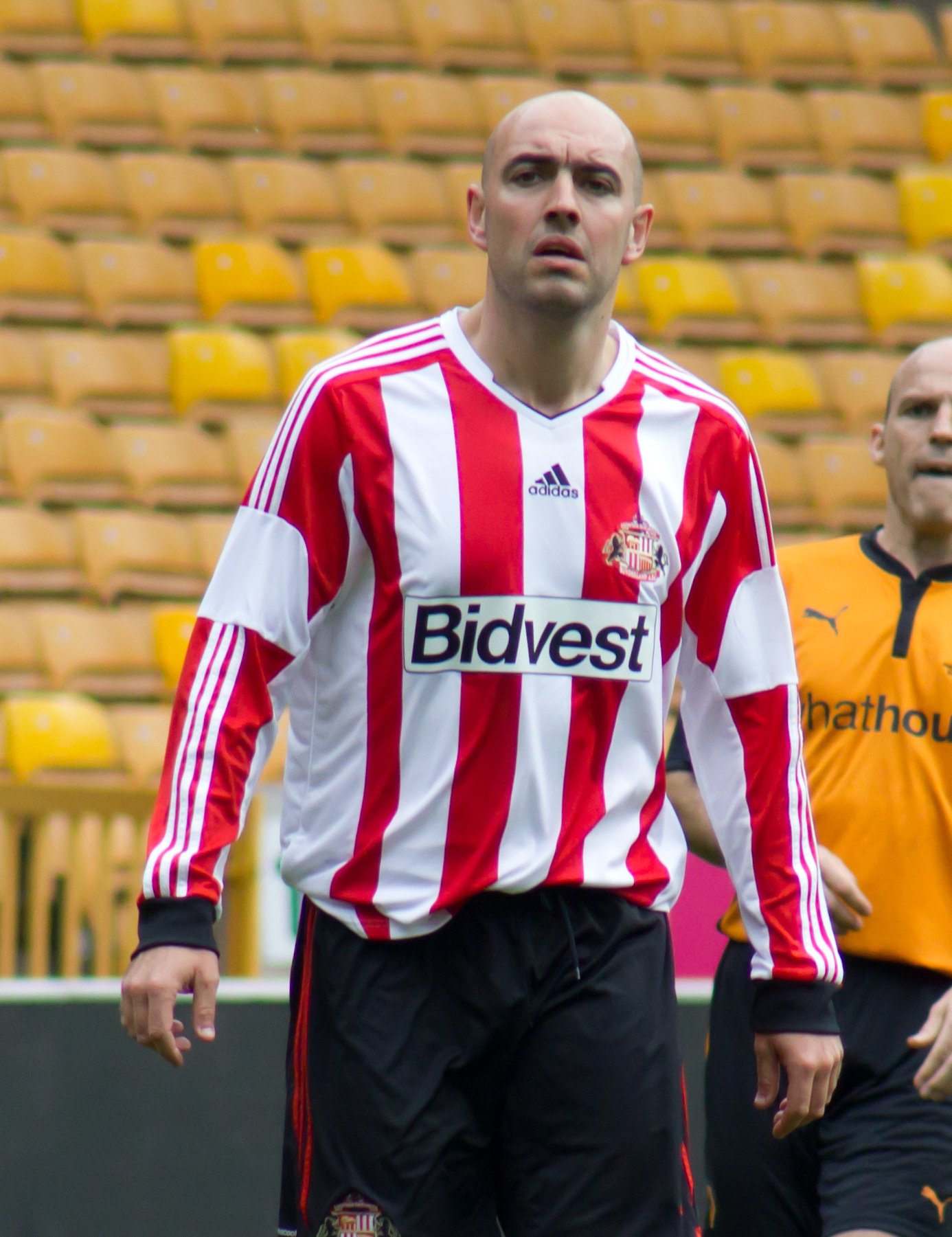
- McCann during Jody Craddock's testimonial match in 2014

Personal information
- Full name: Gavin Peter McCann
- Date of birth: 10 January 1978 (age 48)
- Place of birth: Blackpool, Lancashire, England
- Height: 5 ft 11 in (1.80 m)
- Position: Midfielder

Team information
- Current team: Hyde United (first team coach)

Youth career
- –1995: Everton

Senior career*
Years	Team	Apps	(Gls)
1995–1998	Everton	11	(0)
1998–2003	Sunderland	116	(8)
2003–2007	Aston Villa	110	(3)
2007–2010	Bolton Wanderers	75	(1)
Total		312	(12)

International career
2001	England	1	(0)
- * Club domestic league appearances and goals

Gavin Peter McCann (born 10 January 1978) is an English retired professional footballer who played as a midfielder in the English Premier League. He has one England cap to his name, playing against Spain at Villa Park in 2001. He is the First Team coach at Hyde United.

== Club career ==
McCann played junior football for Y.M.C.A juniors in Lytham St Annes. He signed for Everton where he was a product of their academy. In 1998, he moved to Sunderland where he was a member of the side which won the Division One title and promotion to the Premiership with 105 points in 1999.

He signed for Aston Villa in 2003, where he had numerous injury setbacks. He scored one goal in the 2006–07 season in a 3–1 home loss to Manchester City. He was no longer guaranteed first team football, so decided to leave Villa Park, and in June 2007, he signed a five-year contract with Bolton Wanderers.

McCann scored his first goal for Bolton in their 1–0 UEFA Cup group win over Red Star Belgrade in December 2007 and followed this up with a goal in a 1–1 draw with Sporting Clube de Portugal at the Reebok Stadium three months later in the knockout stage of the cup. He scored his first league goal for Bolton in a 1–0 victory over Middlesbrough at the Riverside Stadium on 19 April 2008.

In November 2008, he received high acclaim from the Bolton manager Gary Megson who stated that the midfielder was playing some of the best football of his career since moving to the Reebok Stadium.

McCann's contract ran out at the end of June 2010, McCann had picked up a knee injury and Owen Coyle said that once he recovered from the injury, he would have a chance to earn a new contract.

In early 2011, teammate Kevin Davies confirmed on the social networking site Twitter that McCann had retired from the game having failed to overcome injury.

== International career ==
McCann has played once for the England national team, in a friendly against Spain at Villa Park in 2001.

== Coaching career ==
In February 2008, McCann launched his own football academy in Lytham St Annes, the first one on the Fylde coast. The Milligan-McCann Academy is aimed at 8- to 12-year-olds and runs at King Edward VII and Queen Mary School. McCann teamed up with former Blackpool players, Jamie Milligan, who has been at Fleetwood Town since 2004 and John Hills who also signed for Fleetwood Town in August 2008, both of whom were born in Blackpool and grew up with McCann, to create the academy. In October 2008, the academy landed a major sponsorship deal with Northern Care, with coaching sessions continuing at King Edward VII & Queen Mary School each weekend as well as week-long summer courses. The academy has also received a grant to encourage children to play "park football".

After retiring, McCann remained active at Bolton Wanderers in the backroom at youth level.

In May 2012, he was appointed as Assistant Manager and first team coach at Hyde, alongside manager Scott McNiven. He left Hyde's management team in early 2015, and studied for his professional coaching badges and also worked for Wrea Green FC on a Sunday morning whilst also playing in a soccer sixes league back where he started at Lytham YMCA.

In late 2015, he was back at Bolton, coaching their U15 team. In 2018, he was promoted to coaching Bolton's U18 team. He left Bolton on 29 January 2021.

After six years back at Bolton working with the academy sides, he returned to Hyde United as the first team coach in February 2022, reuniting once again with his former Wanderers colleague Nicky Spooner.

== Personal life ==
McCann lives in Lytham St Annes with his wife and children.

== Career statistics ==
=== Club ===
Appearances and goals by club, season and competition
Club	Season	League			FA Cup		League Cup		Other		Total	
Club	Season	Division	Apps	Goals	Apps	Goals	Apps	Goals	Apps	Goals	Apps	Goals
Everton	1997–98	Premier League	11	0	0	0	0	0	—		11	0
Sunderland	1998–99	First Division	11	0	2	1	1	1	—		14	2
Sunderland	1999–2000	Premier League	24	4	2	1	1	0	—		27	5
Sunderland	2000–01	Premier League	22	3	4	0	2	0	—		28	3
Sunderland	2001–02	Premier League	29	0	1	0	1	0	—		31	0
Sunderland	2002–03	Premier League	30	1	3	1	2	1	—		35	3
Sunderland	Total		116	8	12	3	7	2	—		135	13
Aston Villa	2003–04	Premier League	28	0	1	0	6	2	—		35	2
Aston Villa	2004–05	Premier League	20	1	1	0	2	0	—		23	1
Aston Villa	2005–06	Premier League	32	1	4	0	2	0	—		38	1
Aston Villa	2006–07	Premier League	30	1	1	0	2	0	—		33	1
Aston Villa	Total		110	3	7	0	12	2	—		129	5
Bolton Wanderers	2007–08	Premier League	31	1	0	0	2	0	8 (Note: Appearances in UEFA Cup)	2	41	3
Bolton Wanderers	2008–09	Premier League	33	0	0	0	1	0	—		34	0
Bolton Wanderers	2009–10	Premier League	11	0	0	0	2	0	—		13	0
Bolton Wanderers	Total		75	1	0	0	5	0	8	2	88	3
Career total			312	12	19	3	24	4	8	2	363	21
