= Mehmet Güven =

Turkish footballer

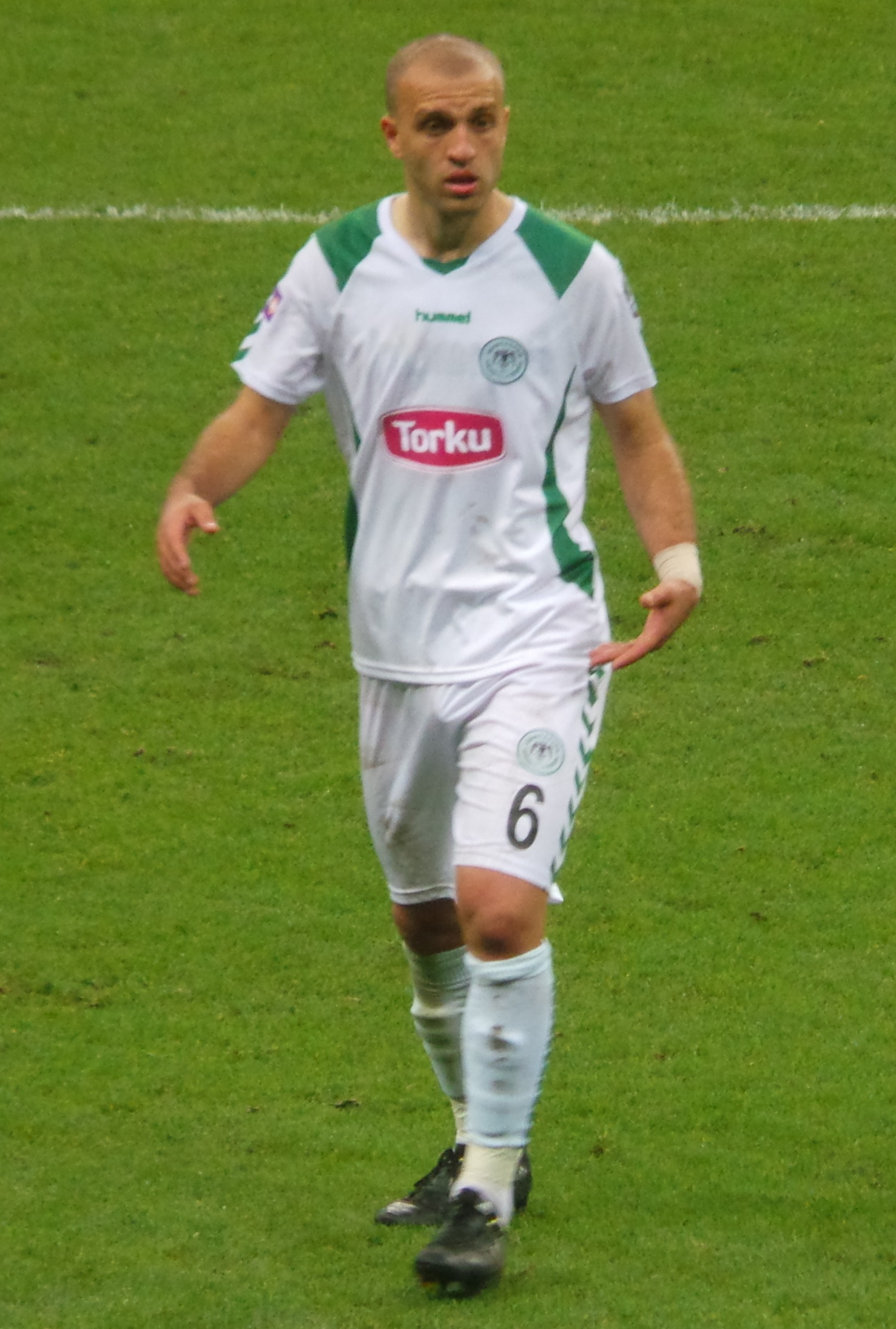

Personal information
- Date of birth: 30 July 1987 (age 39)
- Place of birth: Malatya, Turkey
- Height: 1.83 m (6 ft 0 in)
- Position: Midfielder

Team information
- Current team: Kavaklıderespor

Youth career
- 2000–2005: Galatasaray A2

Senior career*
Years	Team	Apps	(Gls)
2005–2009	Galatasaray	39	(1)
2009–2012	Manisaspor	69	(5)
2012–2013	Eskişehirspor	19	(0)
2013–2015	Konyaspor	51	(2)
2015–2018	Osmanlıspor	70	(4)
2018–2019	Afjet Afyonspor	15	(0)
2019–2020	Giresunspor	22	(1)
2020–2021	Manisa FK	25	(1)
2021–2022	Etimesgut Belediyespor	2	(0)
2022	→ Kahramanmaraşspor (loan)	13	(0)
2022–	Kavaklıderespor		

International career^{‡}
2002	Turkey U16	3	(0)
2003	Turkey U17	4	(0)
2004–2005	Turkey U18	6	(0)
2006	Turkey U19	6	(0)
2005	Turkey U20	2	(0)
2006–2008	Turkey U21	16	(0)
2008–2011	Turkey A2	4	(0)
- * Club domestic league appearances and goals as of 7 May 2022 ‡ National team caps and goals as of 10 February 2011

Mehmet Güven (born 30 July 1987) is a Turkish footballer who plays as a midfielder for an amateur side Kavaklıderespor.

== Career ==
Güven is a product of the Galatasaray Youth Team. He joined the senior squad in 2005–06 and made his debut on February 2, 2006, in a cup match at home against Giresunspor.

== Honours ==
Galatasaray

- Süper Lig: 2005–06, 2007–08
- Turkish Super Cup: 2008

== Career statistics ==
Club	Season	League		Cup		League Cup		Europe		Total	
Club	Season	Apps	Goals	Apps	Goals	Apps	Goals	Apps	Goals	Apps	Goals
Galatasaray	2005–06	1	0	1	0	1	0	0	0	3	0
Galatasaray	2006–07	9	1	2	0	0	0	2	0	13	1
Galatasaray	2007–08	12	0	5	1	0	0	1	0	18	1
Galatasaray	2008–09	16	0	3	0	0	0	5	0	24	0
Galatasaray	Total	38	1	11	1	1	0	8	0	58	2
Manisaspor	2009–10	23	1	6	0	0	0	-	-	29	1
Manisaspor	2010–11	30	4	3	0	0	0	-	-	33	4
Manisaspor	2011–12	16	0	0	0	0	0	-	-	16	0
Manisaspor	Total	69	5	9	0	0	0	0	0	78	5
Eskişehirspor	2012–13	18	0	5	0	0	0	3	0	26	0
Eskişehirspor	Total	18	0	5	0	0	0	3	0	26	0

As of 17 May 2013
