= Cihan Can =

Turkish footballer

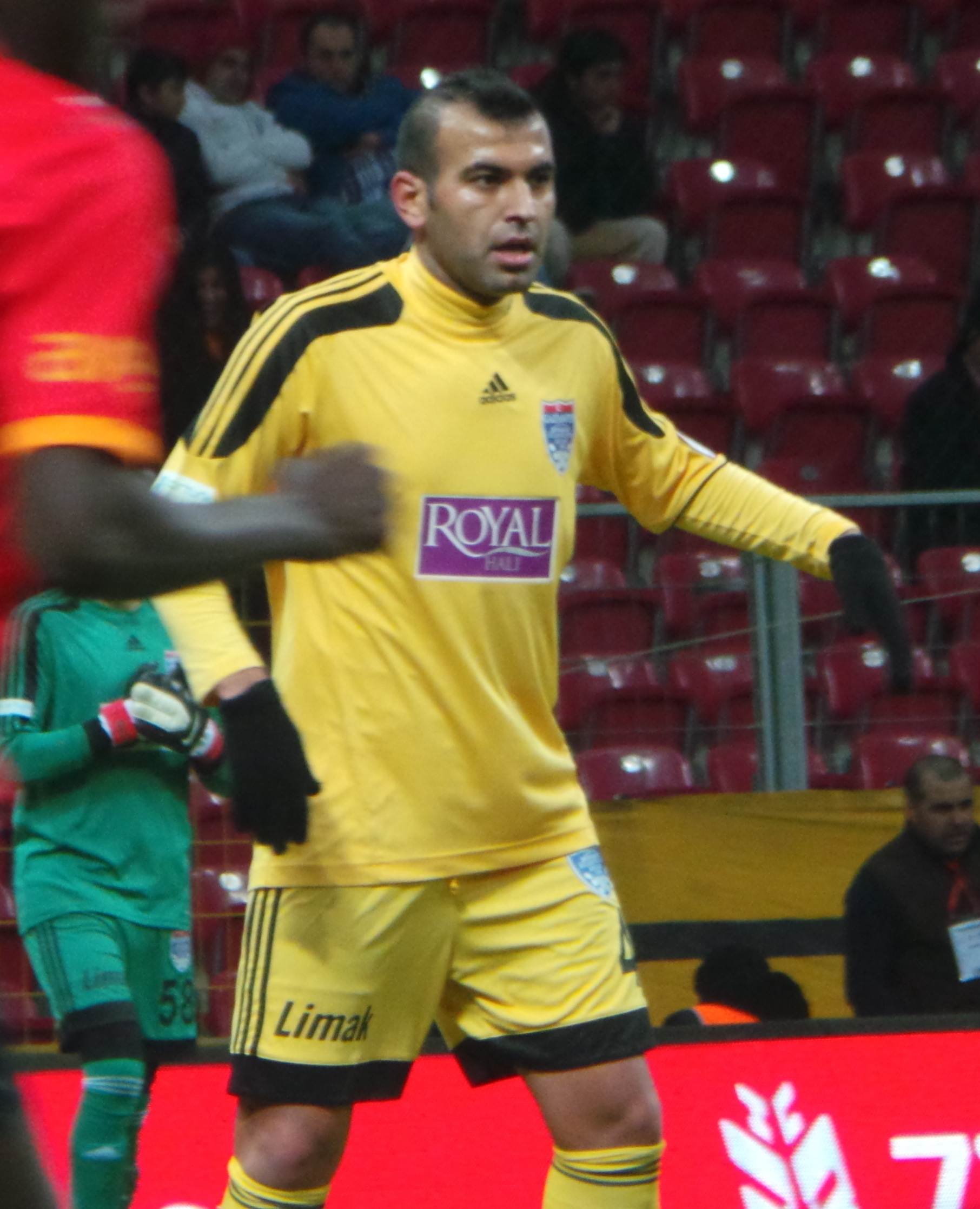

Personal information
- Date of birth: 1 August 1986 (age 40)
- Place of birth: Istanbul, Turkey
- Height: 1.82 m (6 ft 0 in)
- Position: Defensive midfielder

Team information
- Current team: Ergene Velimeşe

Youth career
- Güngören
- Altinova
- Galatasaray

Senior career*
Years	Team	Apps	(Gls)
2005–2009	Galatasaray	0	(0)
2006	→ Sakaryaspor (loan)	5	(0)
2006–2007	→ Mersin İY (loan)		
2007–2008	→ Orduspor (loan)		
2008–2009	→ Gaziantep BB (loan)	30	(2)
2010–2014	Gaziantep BB	130	(4)
2014–2017	Giresunspor	51	(2)
2017–2018	Menemen Belediyespor	30	(0)
2018–2020	Keçiörengücü	25	(1)
2020–	Ergene Velimeşe	0	(0)
- * Club domestic league appearances and goals as of 12 July 2020

Cihan Can (born 1 August 1986) is a Turkish professional footballer who currently plays as a defender for Ergene Velimeşe.

== Career ==
Can was promoted to Galatasaray's first team from the youth team in 2005. He played in for the first team in friendly matches but did not play in any official matches. He was an unused substitute in Galatasaray's UEFA Cup first round loss to Tromsø IL.

He was loaned out to Sakaryaspor in the 2005–06 mid-season break. After a half season spell, he returned to Galatasaray. Can was again loaned out, to Mersin İdman Yurdu, for the 2006–07 season. For the 2007–08 season, he was loaned out to Orduspor. The following season, Galatasaray loaned Can to Gaziantep Büyükşehir Belediyespor, and he signed for the club permanently in January 2010.
