= 2007–08 UEFA Cup knockout stage =

European club football competition

The knockout stage of the 2007–08 UEFA Cup began on 13 February 2008. It was completed on 14 May 2008 with the final at the City of Manchester Stadium, Manchester. The knockout stage involves the 24 teams who finished in the top three in each of their groups in the group stage, along with the eight third-placed clubs from the Champions League group stage.

Each tie in the knockout stage, apart from the final, were played over two legs, with each team playing one leg at home. The team that has the higher aggregate score over the two legs will progress to the next round. In the event that aggregate scores finish level, the team that scored more goals away from home over the two legs will progress. If away goals are equal too, 30 minutes of extra time are played, followed by a penalty shoot-out if scores are still level.

In the final, the tie is played over just one leg at a neutral venue. If scores are level at the end of normal time in the final, extra time is played, followed by penalties if scores remain tied.

Russian club Zenit Saint Petersburg won the final 2–0 against Scottish side Rangers, with goals from Igor Denisov and Konstantin Zyryanov coming in the last 20 minutes of the game to give Zenit their first UEFA Cup title.

Times are CET/CEST, (Note: CET (UTC+1) for dates up to 29 March 2007 (round of 32 and round of 16), and CEST (UTC+2) for dates thereafter (quarter-finals, semi-finals and final).) as listed by UEFA.

== Qualified teams ==
The knockout stage involved 32 teams: the 24 teams which qualified as the winners, runners-up and third-placed teams of each of the eight groups in the group stage, and the eight third-placed teams from the Champions League group stage.

=== UEFA Cup group stage top-three teams ===
Group	Winners	Runners-up	Third-placed teams
A	(England) Everton	(Germany) 1. FC Nürnberg	(Russia) Zenit Saint Petersburg
B	(Spain) Atlético Madrid	(Greece) Panathinaikos	(Scotland) Aberdeen
C	(Spain) Villarreal	(Italy) Fiorentina	(Greece) AEK Athens
D	(Germany) Hamburger SV	(Switzerland) Basel	(Norway) Brann
E	(Germany) Bayer Leverkusen	(Russia) Spartak Moscow	(Switzerland) Zürich
F	(Germany) Bayern Munich	(Portugal) Braga	(England) Bolton Wanderers
G	(Spain) Getafe	(England) Tottenham Hotspur	(Belgium) Anderlecht
H	(France) Bordeaux	(Sweden) Helsingborgs IF	(Turkey) Galatasaray

=== Champions League group stage third-placed teams ===
Group	Third-placed teams
A	(France) Marseille
B	(Norway) Rosenborg
C	(Germany) Werder Bremen
D	(Portugal) Benfica
E	(Scotland) Rangers
F	(Portugal) Sporting CP
G	(Netherlands) PSV Eindhoven
H	(Czech Republic) Slavia Prague

== Bracket ==
Round of 32
(Belgium) Anderlecht	2	1	3
(France) Bordeaux	1	1	2
(Scotland) Aberdeen	2	1	3
(Germany) Bayern Munich	2	5	7
(Portugal) Benfica	1	2	3
(Germany) 1. FC Nürnberg	0	2	2
(Greece) AEK Athens	1	0	1
(Spain) Getafe	1	3	4
(Turkey) Galatasaray	0	1	1
(Germany) Bayer Leverkusen	0	5	5
(Switzerland) Zürich	1	0	1
(Germany) Hamburger SV	3	0	3
(France) Marseille	3	0	3
(Russia) Spartak Moscow	0	2	2
(Russia) Zenit Saint Petersburg (a)	1	1	2
(Spain) Villarreal	0	2	2
(Scotland) Rangers (a)	0	1	1
(Greece) Panathinaikos	0	1	1
(Germany) Werder Bremen	3	1	4
(Portugal) Braga	0	0	0
(England) Bolton Wanderers	1	0	1
(Spain) Atlético Madrid	0	0	0
(Portugal) Sporting CP	2	3	5
(Switzerland) Basel	0	0	0
(Norway) Rosenborg	0	1	1
(Italy) Fiorentina	1	2	3
(Norway) Brann	0	1	1
(England) Everton	2	6	8
(Czech Republic) Slavia Prague	1	1	2
(England) Tottenham Hotspur	2	1	3
(Netherlands) PSV Eindhoven	2	2	4
(Sweden) Helsingborgs IF	0	1	1

Round of 16
(Belgium) Anderlecht	0	2	2
(Germany) Bayern Munich	5	1	6
(Portugal) Benfica	1	0	1
(Spain) Getafe	2	1	3
(Germany) Bayer Leverkusen (a)	1	2	3
(Germany) Hamburger SV	0	3	3
(France) Marseille	3	0	3
(Russia) Zenit Saint Petersburg (a)	1	2	3
(Scotland) Rangers	2	0	2
(Germany) Werder Bremen	0	1	1
(England) Bolton Wanderers	1	0	1
(Portugal) Sporting CP	1	1	2
(Italy) Fiorentina (p)	2	0	2 (4)
(England) Everton	0	2	2 (2)
(England) Tottenham Hotspur	0	1	1 (5)
(Netherlands) PSV Eindhoven (p)	1	0	1 (6)

Quarter-finals
(Germany) Bayern Munich (a.e.t.; a)	1	3	4
(Spain) Getafe	1	3	4
(Germany) Bayer Leverkusen	1	1	2
(Russia) Zenit Saint Petersburg	4	0	4
(Scotland) Rangers	0	2	2
(Portugal) Sporting CP	0	0	0
(Italy) Fiorentina	1	2	3
(Netherlands) PSV Eindhoven	1	0	1

Semi-finals
(Germany) Bayern Munich	1	0	1
(Russia) Zenit Saint Petersburg	1	4	5
(Scotland) Rangers (p)	0	0	0 (4)
(Italy) Fiorentina	0	0	0 (2)

Final
14 May – Manchester
(Russia) Zenit Saint Petersburg	2
(Scotland) Rangers	0

== Round of 32 ==
The draw for the round of 32, which was conducted by UEFA General Secretary David Taylor and Michele Centenaro, UEFA's head of club competitions, was held on Friday, 21 December 2007 at 13:00 CET in Nyon, Switzerland. The eight group winners were drawn against the eight third-placed teams, while the eight second-placed teams were drawn against the eight teams who finished third in the Champions League groups. Teams from the same group or the same country cannot be drawn together.

=== Summary ===
The first legs were played on 13 and 14 February 2008. The second legs were played on 21 February 2008.

Team 1	Agg.	Team 2	1st leg	2nd leg
Aberdeen (Scotland)	3–7	(Germany) Bayern Munich	2–2	1–5
AEK Athens (Greece)	1–4	(Spain) Getafe	1–1	0–3
Bolton Wanderers (England)	1–0	(Spain) Atlético Madrid	1–0	0–0
Zenit Saint Petersburg (Russia)	2–2 (a)	(Spain) Villarreal	1–0	1–2
Galatasaray (Turkey)	1–5	(Germany) Bayer Leverkusen	0–0	1–5
Anderlecht (Belgium)	3–2	(France) Bordeaux	2–1	1–1
Brann (Norway)	1–8	(England) Everton	0–2	1–6
Zürich (Switzerland)	1–3	(Germany) Hamburger SV	1–3	0–0
Rangers (Scotland)	1–1 (a)	(Greece) Panathinaikos	0–0	1–1
PSV Eindhoven (Netherlands)	4–1	(Sweden) Helsingborgs IF	2–0	2–1
Slavia Prague (Czech Republic)	2–3	(England) Tottenham Hotspur	1–2	1–1
Rosenborg (Norway)	1–3	(Italy) Fiorentina	0–1	1–2
Sporting CP (Portugal)	5–0	(Switzerland) Basel	2–0	3–0
Werder Bremen (Germany)	4–0	(Portugal) Braga	3–0	1–0
Benfica (Portugal)	3–2	(Germany) 1. FC Nürnberg	1–0	2–2
Marseille (France)	3–2	(Russia) Spartak Moscow	3–0	0–2

=== Matches ===
14 February 2008
19:00

Aberdeen (Scotland)	2–2	(Germany) Bayern Munich
Walker 24'; Aluko 41'	Report	Klose 29'; Altıntop 55'

Pittodrie Stadium, Aberdeen
Attendance: 20,047
Referee: Eduardo Iturralde González (Spain)
21 February 2008
18:45

Bayern Munich (Germany)	5–1	(Scotland) Aberdeen
Lúcio 12'; Van Buyten 36'; Podolski 71', 77'; Van Bommel 85'	Report	Lovell 83'

Allianz Arena, Munich
Attendance: 66,000
Referee: Robert Małek (Poland)

Bayern Munich won 7–3 on aggregate.

13 February 2008
19:00

AEK Athens (Greece)	1–1	(Spain) Getafe
Blanco 90+4'	Report	De la Red 86'

Olympic Stadium, Athens
Attendance: 13,038
Referee: Bertrand Layec (France)
21 February 2008
20:45

Getafe (Spain)	3–0	(Greece) AEK Athens
Granero 45+1'; Contra 82' (pen.); Braulio 84'	Report

Coliseum Alfonso Pérez, Getafe
Attendance: 5,728
Referee: Martin Atkinson (England)

Getafe won 4–1 on aggregate.

14 February 2008
21:00

Bolton Wanderers (England)	1–0	(Spain) Atlético Madrid
Diouf 74'	Report

Reebok Stadium, Horwich
Attendance: 26,163
Referee: Peter Rasmussen (Denmark)
21 February 2008
20:45

Atlético Madrid (Spain)	0–0	(England) Bolton Wanderers
	Report

Vicente Calderón, Madrid
Attendance: 27,590
Referee: Jacek Granat (Poland)

Bolton Wanderers won 1–0 on aggregate.

13 February 2008
18:00

Zenit Saint Petersburg (Russia)	1–0	(Spain) Villarreal
Pogrebnyak 63'	Report

Petrovsky Stadium, Saint Petersburg
Attendance: 21,300
Referee: Michael Weiner (Germany)
21 February 2008
20:45

Villarreal (Spain)	2–1	(Russia) Zenit Saint Petersburg
Franco 75'; Tomasson 90'	Report	Pogrebnyak 31'

El Madrigal, Villarreal
Attendance: 14,720
Referee: Stefan Messner (Austria)

2–2 on aggregate; Zenit Saint Petersburg won on away goals.

13 February 2008
18:45

Galatasaray (Turkey)	0–0	(Germany) Bayer Leverkusen
	Report

Ali Sami Yen Stadium, Istanbul
Attendance: 20,006
Referee: Lucílio Batista (Portugal)
21 February 2008
17:00

Bayer Leverkusen (Germany)	5–1	(Turkey) Galatasaray
Barbarez 12', 22'; Kießling 13'; Haggui 55'; Schneider 61' (pen.)	Report	Barusso 87' (pen.)

BayArena, Leverkusen
Attendance: 20,500
Referee: Damir Skomina (Slovenia)

Bayer Leverkusen won 5–1 on aggregate.

13 February 2008
20:45

Anderlecht (Belgium)	2–1	(France) Bordeaux
Polák 79'; Mpenza 90+5'	Report	Jussiê 69' (pen.)

Constant Vanden Stock Stadium, Brussels
Attendance: 15,173
Referee: Paolo Tagliavento (Italy)
21 February 2008
20:45

Bordeaux (France)	1–1	(Belgium) Anderlecht
Cavenaghi 71'	Report	Chatelle 34'

Stade Chaban-Delmas, Bordeaux
Attendance: 20,127
Referee: Selçuk Dereli (Turkey)

Anderlecht won 3–2 on aggregate.

13 February 2008
20:00

Brann (Norway)	0–2	(England) Everton
	Report	Osman 59'; Anichebe 88'

Brann Stadion, Bergen
Attendance: 16,207
Referee: Anton Genov (Bulgaria)
21 February 2008
21:00

Everton (England)	6–1	(Norway) Brann
Yakubu 35', 54', 72'; Johnson 41', 90+2'; Arteta 70'	Report	Vaagan Moen 60'

Goodison Park, Liverpool
Attendance: 32,834
Referee: Nikolai Ivanov (Russia)

Everton won 8–1 on aggregate.

14 February 2008
20:30

Zürich (Switzerland)	1–3	(Germany) Hamburger SV
Hassli 88'	Report	Jarolím 49'; Olić 67'; Trochowski 77'

Letzigrund, Zürich
Attendance: 16,800
Referee: Alan Kelly (Republic of Ireland)
21 February 2008
17:00

Hamburger SV (Germany)	0–0	(Switzerland) Zürich
	Report

Arena Hamburg, Hamburg
Attendance: 33,586
Referee: Kristinn Jakobsson (Iceland)

Hamburger SV won 3–1 on aggregate.

13 February 2008
21:00

Rangers (Scotland)	0–0	(Greece) Panathinaikos
	Report

Ibrox Stadium, Glasgow
Attendance: 45,203
Referee: Nicola Rizzoli (Italy)
21 February 2008
18:00

Panathinaikos (Greece)	1–1	(Scotland) Rangers
Goumas 12'	Report	Novo 81'

Leoforos Alexandras Stadium, Athens
Attendance: 14,452
Referee: Felix Brych (Germany)

1–1 on aggregate; Rangers won on away goals.

13 February 2008
20:45

PSV Eindhoven (Netherlands)	2–0	(Sweden) Helsingborgs IF
Simons 7' (pen.); Lazović 33'	Report

Philips Stadion, Eindhoven
Attendance: 22,000
Referee: Costas Kapitanis (Cyprus)
21 February 2008
20:45

Helsingborgs IF (Sweden)	1–2	(Netherlands) PSV Eindhoven
Castán 81'	Report	Bakkal 47'; Lazović 65'

Olympia, Helsingborg
Attendance: 10,194
Referee: Zsolt Szabo (Hungary)

PSV Eindhoven won 4–1 on aggregate.

14 February 2008
21:00

Slavia Prague (Czech Republic)	1–2	(England) Tottenham Hotspur
Strihavka 69'	Report	Berbatov 4'; Keane 30'

Stadion Evžena Rošického, Prague
Attendance: 11,134
Referee: Claudio Circhetta (Switzerland)
21 February 2008
20:45

Tottenham Hotspur (England)	1–1	(Czech Republic) Slavia Prague
O'Hara 7'	Report	Krajčík 51'

White Hart Lane, London
Attendance: 34,224
Referee: Jonas Eriksson (Sweden)

Tottenham Hotspur won 3–2 on aggregate.

14 February 2008
20:45

Rosenborg (Norway)	0–1	(Italy) Fiorentina
	Report	Mutu 16'

Lerkendal Stadion, Trondheim
Attendance: 10,584
Referee: Mark Clattenburg (England)
21 February 2008
20:45

Fiorentina (Italy)	2–1	(Norway) Rosenborg
Liverani 38'; Cacia 81'	Report	Koné 88'

Stadio Artemio Franchi, Florence
Attendance: 23,139
Referee: Darko Ceferin (Slovenia)

Fiorentina won 3–1 on aggregate.

13 February 2008
21:45

Sporting CP (Portugal)	2–0	(Switzerland) Basel
Vukčević 8', 58'	Report

Estádio José Alvalade, Lisbon
Attendance: 16,639
Referee: Kevin Blom (Netherlands)
21 February 2008
21:00

Basel (Switzerland)	0–3	(Portugal) Sporting CP
	Report	Pereirinha 2'; Liédson 41', 51'

St. Jakob-Park, Basel
Attendance: 16,360
Referee: Tommy Skjerven (Norway)

Sporting CP won 5–0 on aggregate.

13 February 2008
20:30

Werder Bremen (Germany)	3–0	(Portugal) Braga
Naldo 5'; Jensen 27'; Almeida 90+5' (pen.)	Report

Weserstadion, Bremen
Attendance: 25,690
Referee: Georgios Kasnaferis (Greece)
21 February 2008
22:30

Braga (Portugal)	0–1	(Germany) Werder Bremen
	Report	Klasnić 78'

Estádio Municipal de Braga, Braga
Attendance: 5,706
Referee: Serge Gumienny (Belgium)

Werder Bremen won 4–0 on aggregate.

14 February 2008
21:45

Benfica (Portugal)	1–0	(Germany) 1. FC Nürnberg
Makukula 43'	Report

Estádio da Luz, Lisbon
Attendance: 28,378
Referee: Alexandru Tudor (Romania)
21 February 2008
21:00

1. FC Nürnberg (Germany)	2–2	(Portugal) Benfica
Charisteas 59'; Saenko 66'	Report	Cardozo 90'; Di María 90+2'

easyCredit-Stadion, Nuremberg
Attendance: 42,846
Referee: Ivan Bebek (Croatia)

Benfica won 3–2 on aggregate.

13 February 2008
20:45

Marseille (France)	3–0	(Russia) Spartak Moscow
Cheyrou 62'; Taiwo 68'; Niang 79'	Report

Stade Vélodrome, Marseille
Attendance: 31,790
Referee: Pedro Proença (Portugal)
21 February 2008
17:30

Spartak Moscow (Russia)	2–0	(France) Marseille
Pavlenko 39'; Pavlyuchenko 85'	Report

Luzhniki Stadium, Moscow
Attendance: 18,000
Referee: Thomas Einwaller (Austria)

Marseille won 3–2 on aggregate.

== Round of 16 ==
The draw for the round of 16, which was conducted by UEFA General Secretary David Taylor, was also held on Friday, 21 December 2007 at 13:00 CET in Nyon, Switzerland. Unlike the previous rounds, teams from the same group or country may be drawn together from the round of 16 onwards.

=== Summary ===
The first legs were played on 6 March 2008. The second legs were played on 12 and 13 March 2008.

Team 1	Agg.	Team 2	1st leg	2nd leg
Anderlecht (Belgium)	2–6	(Germany) Bayern Munich	0–5	2–1
Rangers (Scotland)	2–1	(Germany) Werder Bremen	2–0	0–1
Bolton Wanderers (England)	1–2	(Portugal) Sporting CP	1–1	0–1
Bayer Leverkusen (Germany)	3–3 (a)	(Germany) Hamburger SV	1–0	2–3
Benfica (Portugal)	1–3	(Spain) Getafe	1–2	0–1
Fiorentina (Italy)	2–2 (4–2 p)	(England) Everton	2–0	0–2 (a.e.t.)
Tottenham Hotspur (England)	1–1 (5–6 p)	(Netherlands) PSV Eindhoven	0–1	1–0 (a.e.t.)
Marseille (France)	3–3 (a)	(Russia) Zenit Saint Petersburg	3–1	0–2

=== Matches ===
6 March 2008
19:00

Anderlecht (Belgium)	0–5	(Germany) Bayern Munich
	Report	Altıntop 9'; Toni 45+1'; Podolski 57'; Klose 67'; Ribéry 86'

Constant Vanden Stock Stadium, Brussels
Attendance: 21,845
Referee: Olegário Benquerença (Portugal)
12 March 2008
20:45

Bayern Munich (Germany)	1–2	(Belgium) Anderlecht
Lúcio 9'	Report	Serhat 20'; Iakovenko 35'

Allianz Arena, Munich
Attendance: 63,000
Referee: Terje Hauge (Norway)

Bayern Munich won 6–2 on aggregate.

6 March 2008
21:00

Rangers (Scotland)	2–0	(Germany) Werder Bremen
Cousin 45'; Davis 47'	Report

Ibrox Stadium, Glasgow
Attendance: 45,959
Referee: Alain Hamer (Luxembourg)
13 March 2008
20:30

Werder Bremen (Germany)	1–0	(Scotland) Rangers
Diego 58'	Report

Weserstadion, Bremen
Attendance: 33,660
Referee: Martin Hansson (Sweden)

Rangers won 2–1 on aggregate.

6 March 2008
21:00

Bolton Wanderers (England)	1–1	(Portugal) Sporting CP
McCann 25'	Report	Vukčević 69'

Reebok Stadium, Horwich
Attendance: 25,664
Referee: Alon Yefet (Israel)
13 March 2008
21:00

Sporting CP (Portugal)	1–0	(England) Bolton Wanderers
Pereirinha 85'	Report

Estádio José Alvalade, Lisbon
Attendance: 22,031
Referee: Bertrand Layec (France)

Sporting CP won 2–1 on aggregate.

6 March 2008
21:05

Bayer Leverkusen (Germany)	1–0	(Germany) Hamburger SV
Gekas 77'	Report

BayArena, Leverkusen
Attendance: 19,849
Referee: Craig Thomson (Scotland)
12 March 2008
17:45

Hamburger SV (Germany)	3–2	(Germany) Bayer Leverkusen
Trochowski 53'; Guerrero 65'; Van der Vaart 81'	Report	Barbarez 19'; Gekas 55'

Arena Hamburg, Hamburg
Attendance: 37,083
Referee: Alberto Undiano Mallenco (Spain)

3–3 on aggregate; Bayer Leverkusen won on away goals.

6 March 2008
21:30

Benfica (Portugal)	1–2	(Spain) Getafe
Mantorras 76'	Report	De la Red 25'; Hernández 67'

Estádio da Luz, Lisbon
Attendance: 26,925
Referee: Grzegorz Gilewski (Poland)
12 March 2008
21:00

Getafe (Spain)	1–0	(Portugal) Benfica
Albín 77'	Report

Coliseum Alfonso Pérez, Getafe
Attendance: 9,131
Referee: Viktor Kassai (Hungary)

Getafe won 3–1 on aggregate.

6 March 2008
20:45

Fiorentina (Italy)	2–0	(England) Everton
Kuzmanović 70'; Montolivo 81'	Report

Stadio Artemio Franchi, Florence
Attendance: 32,934
Referee: Paul Allaerts (Belgium)
12 March 2008
20:45

Everton (England)	2–0 (a.e.t.)	(Italy) Fiorentina
Johnson 16'; Arteta 67'	Report
Penalties
Gravesen (penalty scored); Yakubu (penalty missed); Arteta (penalty scored); Jagielka (penalty missed)	2–4	(penalty scored) Pazzini; (penalty scored) Montolivo; (penalty scored) Osvaldo; (penalty scored) Santana

Goodison Park, Liverpool
Attendance: 38,026
Referee: Eric Braamhaar (Netherlands)

2–2 on aggregate; Fiorentina won 4–2 on penalties.

6 March 2008
21:05

Tottenham Hotspur (England)	0–1	(Netherlands) PSV Eindhoven
	Report	Farfán 34'

White Hart Lane, London
Attendance: 33,259
Referee: Stéphane Lannoy (France)
12 March 2008
20:45

PSV Eindhoven (Netherlands)	0–1 (a.e.t.)	(England) Tottenham Hotspur
	Report	Berbatov 81'
Penalties
Simons (penalty scored); Lazovic (penalty missed); Farfán (penalty scored); Salcido (penalty scored); Dzsudzsák (penalty scored); Bakkal (penalty scored); Marcellis (penalty scored)	6–5	(penalty scored) Berbatov; (penalty scored) O'Hara; (penalty scored) Huddlestone; (penalty scored) Bent; (penalty missed) Jenas; (penalty scored) Zokora; (penalty missed) Chimbonda

PSV Stadium, Eindhoven
Attendance: 33,050
Referee: Matteo Trefoloni (Italy)

1–1 on aggregate; PSV Eindhoven won 6–5 on penalties.

6 March 2008
20:45

Marseille (France)	3–1	(Russia) Zenit Saint Petersburg
Cissé 37', 55'; Niang 48'	Report	Arshavin 82'

Stade Vélodrome, Marseille
Attendance: 24,327
Referee: Knut Kircher (Germany)
12 March 2008
17:30

Zenit Saint Petersburg (Russia)	2–0	(France) Marseille
Pogrebnyak 39', 78'	Report

Petrovsky Stadium, Saint Petersburg
Attendance: 20,400
Referee: Mike Riley (England)

3–3 on aggregate; Zenit Saint Petersburg won on away goals.

== Quarter-finals ==
The draw for the quarter-finals, semi-finals and final, which was conducted by UEFA General Secretary David Taylor and Denis Law, the ambassador for the final in Manchester, was held on Friday, 14 March 2008 at 14:00 CET in Nyon, Switzerland.

=== Summary ===
The first legs were played on 3 April and the second legs were played on 10 April 2008.

Team 1	Agg.	Team 2	1st leg	2nd leg
Bayer Leverkusen (Germany)	2–4	(Russia) Zenit Saint Petersburg	1–4	1–0
Rangers (Scotland)	2–0	(Portugal) Sporting CP	0–0	2–0
Bayern Munich (Germany)	4–4 (a)	(Spain) Getafe	1–1	3–3 (a.e.t.)
Fiorentina (Italy)	3–1	(Netherlands) PSV Eindhoven	1–1	2–0

=== Matches ===
3 April 2008
18:30

Bayer Leverkusen (Germany)	1–4	(Russia) Zenit Saint Petersburg
Kießling 33'	Report	Arshavin 20'; Pogrebnyak 52'; Anyukov 61'; Denisov 64'

BayArena, Leverkusen
Attendance: 19,500
Referee: Olegário Benquerença (Portugal)
10 April 2008
18:30

Zenit Saint Petersburg (Russia)	0–1	(Germany) Bayer Leverkusen
	Report	Bulykin 18'

Petrovsky Stadium, Saint Petersburg
Attendance: 21,500
Referee: Manuel Mejuto González (Spain)

Zenit Saint Petersburg won 4–2 on aggregate.

3 April 2008
20:45

Rangers (Scotland)	0–0	(Portugal) Sporting CP
	Report

Ibrox Stadium, Glasgow
Attendance: 48,923
Referee: Yuri Baskakov (Russia)
10 April 2008
20:45

Sporting CP (Portugal)	0–2	(Scotland) Rangers
	Report	Darcheville 60'; Whittaker 90+2'

Estádio José Alvalade, Lisbon
Attendance: 31,155
Referee: Konrad Plautz (Austria)

Rangers won 2–0 on aggregate.

3 April 2008
20:45

Bayern Munich (Germany)	1–1	(Spain) Getafe
Toni 26'	Report	Contra 90'

Allianz Arena, Munich
Attendance: 62,000
Referee: Howard Webb (England)
10 April 2008
20:45

Getafe (Spain)	3–3 (a.e.t.)	(Germany) Bayern Munich
Contra 44'; Casquero 91'; Braulio 93'	Report	Ribéry 89'; Toni 115', 120'

Coliseum Alfonso Pérez, Getafe
Attendance: 14,225
Referee: Massimo Busacca (Switzerland)

4–4 on aggregate; Bayern Munich won on away goals.

3 April 2008
20:45

Fiorentina (Italy)	1–1	(Netherlands) PSV Eindhoven
Mutu 56'	Report	Koevermans 63'

Stadio Artemio Franchi, Florence
Attendance: 34,317
Referee: Laurent Duhamel (France)
10 April 2008
20:45

PSV Eindhoven (Netherlands)	0–2	(Italy) Fiorentina
	Report	Mutu 38', 53'

PSV Stadium, Eindhoven
Attendance: 35,000
Referee: Luis Medina Cantalejo (Spain)

Fiorentina won 3–1 on aggregate.

== Semi-finals ==
=== Summary ===
The semi-final matches were played on 24 April and 1 May 2008.

Team 1	Agg.	Team 2	1st leg	2nd leg
Bayern Munich (Germany)	1–5	(Russia) Zenit Saint Petersburg	1–1	0–4
Rangers (Scotland)	0–0 (4–2 p)	(Italy) Fiorentina	0–0	0–0 (a.e.t.)

=== Matches ===
24 April 2008
20:45

Bayern Munich (Germany)	1–1	(Russia) Zenit Saint Petersburg
Ribéry 18'	Report	Lúcio 60' (o.g.)

Allianz Arena, Munich
Attendance: 66,000
Referee: Ľuboš Micheľ (Slovakia)
1 May 2008
18:30

Zenit Saint Petersburg (Russia)	4–0	(Germany) Bayern Munich
Pogrebnyak 4', 73'; Zyryanov 39'; Fayzulin 54'	Report

Petrovsky Stadium, Saint Petersburg
Attendance: 21,300
Referee: Tom Henning Øvrebø (Norway)

Zenit Saint Petersburg won 5–1 on aggregate.

24 April 2008
20:45

Rangers (Scotland)	0–0	(Italy) Fiorentina
	Report

Ibrox Stadium, Glasgow
Attendance: 49,199
Referee: Kyros Vassaras (Greece)
1 May 2008
20:45

Fiorentina (Italy)	0–0 (a.e.t.)	(Scotland) Rangers
	Report
Penalties
Kuzmanović (penalty scored); Montolivo (penalty scored); Liverani (penalty missed); Vieri (penalty missed)	2–4	(penalty missed) Ferguson; (penalty scored) Whittaker; (penalty scored) Papac; (penalty scored) Hemdani; (penalty scored) Novo

Stadio Artemio Franchi, Florence
Attendance: 39,130
Referee: Frank De Bleeckere (Belgium)

0–0 on aggregate; Rangers won 4–2 on penalties.

== Final ==
The final took place on 14 May 2008 at the City of Manchester Stadium in Manchester, England.

14 May 2008
20:45 (19:45 UTC+1)

Zenit Saint Petersburg (Russia)	2–0	(Scotland) Rangers
Denisov 72'; Zyryanov 90+4'	Report

City of Manchester Stadium, Manchester
Attendance: 43,878
Referee: Peter Fröjdfeldt (Sweden)
