= 2007–08 UEFA Cup group stage =

International football competition

This article charts the seedings and the results of the group stage of the 2007–08 UEFA Cup.

== Teams ==
The group stage draw took place on 9 October 2007 at the UEFA headquarters in Nyon, Switzerland. The following teams qualified for the group stage:

Key to colours
Group winners, runners-up and third-placed teams advanced to round of 32

Pot 1
Team	Coeff.
(Spain) Villarreal	78.374
(Germany) Bayern Munich	73.640
(Netherlands) AZ	63.995
(Greece) Panathinaikos	55.415
(Switzerland) Basel	54.869
(France) Bordeaux	49.706
(Germany) Bayer Leverkusen	45.640
(Belgium) Anderlecht	41.594

Pot 2
Team	Coeff.
(England) Tottenham Hotspur	40.618
(Russia) Lokomotiv Moscow	38.920
(Russia) Zenit Saint Petersburg	38.920
(Czech Republic) Sparta Prague	37.851
(Greece) AEK Athens	36.415
(Germany) Hamburger SV	34.640
(England) Bolton Wanderers	32.618
Austria Wien	30.104

Pot 3
Team	Coeff.
(Russia) Spartak Moscow	27.920
(Portugal) Braga	27.107
(Turkey) Galatasaray	26.791
(Spain) Atlético Madrid	25.374
(Spain) Getafe	25.374
(England) Everton	24.618
(Italy) Fiorentina	21.808
(France) Rennes	20.706

Pot 4
Team	Coeff.
(Israel) Hapoel Tel Aviv	19.338
(Serbia) Red Star Belgrade	19.256
(Denmark) Copenhagen	19.129
(France) Toulouse	17.706
(Croatia) Dinamo Zagreb	17.533
(Greece) Panionios	16.415
(Germany) 1. FC Nürnberg	14.640
(Czech Republic) Mladá Boleslav	13.851

Pot 5
Team	Coeff.
(Greece) Aris	13.415
(Scotland) Aberdeen	11.064
(Switzerland) Zürich	9.869
(Greece) AEL Larissa	8.415
(Denmark) AaB	7.129
(Norway) Brann	6.509
(Sweden) IF Elfsborg	4.478
(Sweden) Helsingborgs IF	3.478

== Tie-breaking criteria ==
Based on paragraph 6.06 in the UEFA regulations for the current season, if two or more teams are equal on points on completion of the group matches, the following criteria are applied to determine the rankings:

1. superior goal difference from all group matches played;
2. higher number of goals scored;
3. higher number of goals scored away;
4. higher number of wins;
5. higher number of away wins;
6. higher number of coefficient points accumulated by the club in question, as well as its association, over the previous five seasons.

== Groups ==
All times are CET, as listed by UEFA.

=== Group A ===
Pos	Team	Pld	W	D	L	GF	GA	GD	Pts	Qualification	EVE	NÜR	ZEN	AZ	AEL
1	(England) Everton	4	4	0	0	9	3	+6	12	Advance to knockout stage	—	—	1–0	—	3–1
2	(Germany) 1. FC Nürnberg	4	2	1	1	7	6	+1	7	Advance to knockout stage	0–2	—	—	2–1	—
3	(Russia) Zenit Saint Petersburg	4	1	2	1	6	6	0	5	Advance to knockout stage	—	2–2	—	1–1	—
4	(Netherlands) AZ	4	1	1	2	5	6	−1	4		2–3	—	—	—	1–0
5	(Greece) AEL Larissa	4	0	0	4	4	10	−6	0		—	1–3	2–3	—	—

25 October 2007
17:30

Zenit Saint Petersburg (Russia)	1–1	(Netherlands) AZ
Tymoshchuk 43' (pen.)	Report	Ari 20'

Petrovsky Stadium, St. Petersburg
Attendance: 15,400
Referee: Kostas Kapitanis (Cyprus)
25 October 2007
21:00

Everton (England)	3–1	(Greece) AEL Larissa
Cahill 14'; Osman 50'; Anichebe 85'	Report	Cleyton 65'

Goodison Park, Liverpool
Attendance: 33,777
Referee: Martin Ingvarsson (Sweden)

8 November 2007
16:30

AEL Larissa (Greece)	2–3	(Russia) Zenit Saint Petersburg
Alexandrou 58'; Fotakis 62'	Report	Pogrebnyak 39'; Zyryanov 70'; Fatih Tekke 78'

Panthessaliko Stadium, Volos
Attendance: 14,508
Referee: Nicolai Vollquartz (Denmark)
8 November 2007
21:05

1. FC Nürnberg (Germany)	0–2	(England) Everton
	Report	Arteta 83' (pen.); Anichebe 88'

Frankenstadion, Nuremberg
Attendance: 43,000
Referee: Alberto Undiano Mallenco (Spain)

29 November 2007
17:00

Zenit Saint Petersburg (Russia)	2–2	(Germany) 1. FC Nürnberg
Pogrebnyak 76'; Ionov 79'	Report	Charisteas 25'; Benko 84'

Petrovsky Stadium, St. Petersburg
Attendance: 18,123
Referee: Pavel Královec (Czech Republic)
29 November 2007
20:45

AZ (Netherlands)	1–0	(Greece) AEL Larissa
Dembélé 77'	Report

DSB Stadion, Alkmaar
Attendance: 15,700
Referee: Levan Paniashvili (Georgia)

5 December 2007
20:45

1. FC Nürnberg (Germany)	2–1	(Netherlands) AZ
Mintál 83', 85'	Report	De Zeeuw 29'

Frankenstadion, Nuremberg
Attendance: 35,020
Referee: Stefan Johannesson (Sweden)
5 December 2007
20:45

Everton (England)	1–0	(Russia) Zenit Saint Petersburg
Cahill 85'	Report

Goodison Park, Liverpool
Attendance: 38,407
Referee: Kristinn Jakobsson (Iceland)

20 December 2007
20:45

AZ (Netherlands)	2–3	(England) Everton
Pellè 16'; Jaliens 65'	Report	Johnson 2'; Jagielka 43'; Vaughan 79'

DSB Stadion, Alkmaar
Attendance: 16,578
Referee: Selçuk Dereli (Turkey)
20 December 2007
20:45

AEL Larissa (Greece)	1–3	(Germany) 1. FC Nürnberg
Kozlej 11'	Report	Saenko 45'; Mintál 57'; Charisteas 73'

Panthessaliko Stadium, Volos
Attendance: 2,863
Referee: Sten Kaldma (Estonia)

=== Group B ===
Pos	Team	Pld	W	D	L	GF	GA	GD	Pts	Qualification	ATL	PAN	ABE	FCK	LOK
1	(Spain) Atlético Madrid	4	3	1	0	9	4	+5	10	Advance to knockout stage	—	2–1	2–0	—	—
2	(Greece) Panathinaikos	4	3	0	1	7	2	+5	9	Advance to knockout stage	—	—	3–0	—	2–0
3	(Scotland) Aberdeen	4	1	1	2	5	6	−1	4	Advance to knockout stage	—	—	—	4–0	1–1
4	(Denmark) Copenhagen	4	1	0	3	1	7	−6	3		0–2	0–1	—	—	—
5	(Russia) Lokomotiv Moscow	4	0	2	2	4	7	−3	2		3–3	—	—	0–1	—

25 October 2007
18:00

Panathinaikos (Greece)	3–0	(Scotland) Aberdeen
Goumas 11'; Papadopoulos 73'; Salpingidis 77'	Report

Leoforos Alexandras Stadium, Athens
Attendance: 8,154
Referee: Thomas Einwaller (Austria)
25 October 2007
18:45

Lokomotiv Moscow (Russia)	3–3	(Spain) Atlético Madrid
Bilyaletdinov 27'; Odemwingie 60', 63'	Report	Agüero 16', 85'; Forlán 47'

Lokomotiv Stadium, Moscow
Attendance: 13,111
Referee: Mark Clattenburg (England)

8 November 2007
20:15

Copenhagen (Denmark)	0–1	(Greece) Panathinaikos
	Report	N'Doye 15'

Parken Stadium, Copenhagen
Attendance: 25,142
Referee: Vladimír Hriňák (Slovakia)
8 November 2007
20:00

Aberdeen (Scotland)	1–1	(Russia) Lokomotiv Moscow
Diamond 27'	Report	Ivanović 45'

Pittodrie Stadium, Aberdeen
Attendance: 18,843
Referee: Florian Meyer (Germany)

29 November 2007
18:30

Lokomotiv Moscow (Russia)	0–1	(Denmark) Copenhagen
	Report	Nordstrand 62' (pen.)

Lokomotiv Stadium, Moscow
Attendance: 6,500
Referee: Bernhard Brugger (Austria)
29 November 2007
20:45

Atlético Madrid (Spain)	2–0	(Scotland) Aberdeen
Forlán 45' (pen.); Langfield 61' (o.g.)	Report

Vicente Calderón, Madrid
Attendance: 27,045
Referee: Ivan Bebek (Croatia)

5 December 2007
20:45

Copenhagen (Denmark)	0–2	(Spain) Atlético Madrid
	Report	Simão 21'; Agüero 62'

Parken Stadium, Copenhagen
Attendance: 33,034
Referee: Paolo Dondarini (Italy)
5 December 2007
20:45

Panathinaikos (Greece)	2–0	(Russia) Lokomotiv Moscow
Salpingidis 70', 74'	Report

Leoforos Alexandras Stadium, Athens
Attendance: 7,013
Referee: Claudio Circhetta (Switzerland)

20 December 2007
20:45

Atlético Madrid (Spain)	2–1	(Greece) Panathinaikos
L. García 74'; Simão 90+6'	Report	Salpingidis 34'

Vicente Calderón, Madrid
Attendance: 15,986
Referee: Knut Kircher (Germany)
20 December 2007
20:45

Aberdeen (Scotland)	4–0	(Denmark) Copenhagen
Smith 47', 55'; Antonsson 70' (o.g.); Foster 83'	Report

Pittodrie Stadium, Aberdeen
Attendance: 20,446
Referee: Lucílio Batista (Portugal)

=== Group C ===
Pos	Team	Pld	W	D	L	GF	GA	GD	Pts	Qualification	VIL	FIO	AEK	MLA	ELF
1	(Spain) Villarreal	4	3	1	0	7	3	+4	10	Advance to knockout stage	—	1–1	—	—	2–0
2	(Italy) Fiorentina	4	2	2	0	10	4	+6	8	Advance to knockout stage	—	—	—	2–1	6–1
3	(Greece) AEK Athens	4	1	2	1	4	4	0	5	Advance to knockout stage	1–2	1–1	—	—	—
4	(Czech Republic) Mladá Boleslav	4	1	0	3	5	6	−1	3		1–2	—	0–1	—	—
5	(Sweden) IF Elfsborg	4	0	1	3	3	12	−9	1		—	—	1–1	1–3	—

25 October 2007
20:00

IF Elfsborg (Sweden)	1–1	(Greece) AEK Athens
Mobaeck 15'	Report	Pappas 49'

Borås Arena, Borås
Attendance: 4,175
Referee: Peter Sippel (Germany)
25 October 2007
20:45

Villarreal (Spain)	1–1	(Italy) Fiorentina
Capdevila 86'	Report	Vieri 49'

Estadio El Madrigal, Villarreal
Attendance: 12,355
Referee: Stéphane Lannoy (France)

8 November 2007
20:30

Mladá Boleslav (Czech Republic)	1–2	(Spain) Villarreal
Mendy 90'	Report	Nihat 33'; Cazorla 56'

Městský Stadion, Mladá Boleslav
Attendance: 4,082
Referee: Damir Skomina (Slovenia)
8 November 2007
20:45

Fiorentina (Italy)	6–1	(Sweden) IF Elfsborg
Jørgensen 4', 78'; Vieri 5'; Donadel 62'; Krøldrup 65'; Di Carmine 87'	Report	Ishizaki 41'

Stadio Artemio Franchi, Florence
Attendance: 18,732
Referee: Selçuk Dereli (Turkey)

29 November 2007
18:15

IF Elfsborg (Sweden)	1–3	(Czech Republic) Mladá Boleslav
Svensson 31'	Report	Táborský 67'; Mendy 79'; Voríšek 90'

Borås Arena, Borås
Attendance: 3,361
Referee: Alan Kelly (Republic of Ireland)
29 November 2007
20:00

AEK Athens (Greece)	1–1	(Italy) Fiorentina
Balzaretti 34' (o.g.)	Report	Osvaldo 29'

Olympic Stadium, Athens
Attendance: 26,386
Referee: Craig Thomson (Scotland)

5 December 2007
20:45

Mladá Boleslav (Czech Republic)	0–1	(Greece) AEK Athens
	Report	Nsaliwa 46'

Městský Stadion, Mladá Boleslav
Attendance: 4,670
Referee: Johan Verbist (Belgium)
5 December 2007
20:45

Villarreal (Spain)	2–0	(Sweden) IF Elfsborg
Tomasson 2', 51'	Report

Estadio El Madrigal, Villarreal
Attendance: 9,225
Referee: Alexandru Tudor (Romania)

20 December 2007
20:45

AEK Athens (Greece)	1–2	(Spain) Villarreal
Rivaldo 68'	Report	Mavuba 40'; Tomasson 69'

Olympic Stadium, Athens
Attendance: 16,380
Referee: Gerald Lehner (Austria)
20 December 2007
20:45

Fiorentina (Italy)	2–1	(Czech Republic) Mladá Boleslav
Mutu 44' (pen.); Vieri 67'	Report	Rajnoch 60'

Stadio Artemio Franchi, Florence
Attendance: 11,140
Referee: João Ferreira (Portugal)

=== Group D ===
Pos	Team	Pld	W	D	L	GF	GA	GD	Pts	Qualification	HSV	BAS	BRA	DZ	REN
1	(Germany) Hamburger SV	4	3	1	0	7	1	+6	10	Advance to knockout stage	—	1–1	—	—	3–0
2	(Switzerland) Basel	4	2	2	0	3	1	+2	8	Advance to knockout stage	—	—	1–0	—	1–0
3	(Norway) Brann	4	1	1	2	3	4	−1	4	Advance to knockout stage	0–1	—	—	2–1	—
4	(Croatia) Dinamo Zagreb	4	0	2	2	2	5	−3	2		0–2	0–0	—	—	—
5	(France) Rennes	4	0	2	2	2	6	−4	2		—	—	1–1	1–1	—

25 October 2007
19:00

Brann (Norway)	0–1	(Germany) Hamburger SV
	Report	Kompany 62'

Brann Stadion, Bergen
Attendance: 13,029
Referee: Georgios Kasnaferis (Greece)
25 October 2007
20:45

Basel (Switzerland)	1–0	(France) Rennes
Streller 55'	Report

St. Jakob-Park, Basel
Attendance: 11,407
Referee: Nicola Rizzoli (Italy)

8 November 2007
19:00

Rennes (France)	1–1	(Norway) Brann
Cheyrou 88' (pen.)	Report	Karadaş 24'

Stade de la Route de Lorient, Rennes
Attendance: 11,291
Referee: Gerald Lehner (Austria)
8 November 2007
20:15

Dinamo Zagreb (Croatia)	0–0	(Switzerland) Basel
	Report

Maksimir Stadium, Zagreb
Attendance: 22,345
Referee: Serge Gumienny (Belgium)

29 November 2007
19:00

Hamburger SV (Germany)	3–0	(France) Rennes
Van der Vaart 30'; Choupo-Moting 84'; Zidan 90'	Report

HSH Nordbank Arena, Hamburg
Attendance: 36,472
Referee: Mark Clattenburg (England)
29 November 2007
20:15

Brann (Norway)	2–1	(Croatia) Dinamo Zagreb
Bjarnason 45' (pen.); Bakke 72'	Report	Vukojević 49'

Brann Stadion, Bergen
Attendance: 9,962
Referee: Cristian Balaj (Romania)

5 December 2007
20:45

Dinamo Zagreb (Croatia)	0–2	(Germany) Hamburger SV
	Report	De Jong 88'; Trochowski 90+3' (pen.)

Maksimir Stadium, Zagreb
Attendance: 18,870
Referee: Douglas McDonald (Scotland)
5 December 2007
20:45

Basel (Switzerland)	1–0	(Norway) Brann
Carlitos 40'	Report

St. Jakob-Park, Basel
Attendance: 13,731
Referee: Igor Egorov (Russia)

20 December 2007
20:45

Hamburger SV (Germany)	1–1	(Switzerland) Basel
Olić 73'	Report	Ergić 58'

HSH Nordbank Arena, Hamburg
Attendance: 48,917
Referee: Nicolai Vollquartz (Denmark)
20 December 2007
20:45

Rennes (France)	1–1	(Croatia) Dinamo Zagreb
Mbia 88'	Report	Vukojević 57'

Stade de la Route de Lorient, Rennes
Attendance: 11,846
Referee: Mark Courtney (Northern Ireland)

=== Group E ===
Pos	Team	Pld	W	D	L	GF	GA	GD	Pts	Qualification	LEV	SPM	ZÜR	PRA	TOU
1	(Germany) Bayer Leverkusen	4	3	0	1	8	2	+6	9	Advance to knockout stage	—	—	—	1–0	1–0
2	(Russia) Spartak Moscow	4	2	1	1	4	3	+1	7	Advance to knockout stage	2–1	—	1–0	—	—
3	(Switzerland) Zürich	4	2	0	2	4	7	−3	6	Advance to knockout stage	0–5	—	—	—	2–0
4	(Czech Republic) Sparta Prague	4	1	1	2	4	5	−1	4		—	0–0	1–2	—	—
5	(France) Toulouse	4	1	0	3	4	7	−3	3		—	2–1	—	2–3	—

25 October 2007
18:45

Sparta Prague (Czech Republic)	1–2	(Switzerland) Zürich
Slepička 24'	Report	Kondé 38'; Alphonse 62'

AXA Arena, Prague
Attendance: 6,007
Referee: Stuart Dougal (Scotland)
25 October 2007
19:00

Bayer Leverkusen (Germany)	1–0	(France) Toulouse
Kießling 35'	Report

BayArena, Leverkusen
Attendance: 15,267
Referee: Jonas Eriksson (Sweden)

8 November 2007
17:00

Spartak Moscow (Russia)	2–1	(Germany) Bayer Leverkusen
Pavlyuchenko 63' (pen.); Mozart 77' (pen.)	Report	Freier 90'

Luzhniki Stadium, Moscow
Attendance: 23,000
Referee: Kristinn Jakobsson (Iceland)
8 November 2007
20:30

Toulouse (France)	2–3	(Czech Republic) Sparta Prague
Elmander 14'; Mansaré 80'	Report	Dosek 68'; Kisel 69', 88'

Stadium Municipal, Toulouse
Attendance: 15,572
Referee: Eduardo Iturralde González (Spain)

29 November 2007
18:30

Sparta Prague (Czech Republic)	0–0	(Russia) Spartak Moscow
	Report

AXA Arena, Prague
Attendance: 6,307
Referee: Ceri Richards (Wales)
29 November 2007
20:15

Zürich (Switzerland)	2–0	(France) Toulouse
Tihinen 42'; Raffael 69' (pen.)	Report

Letzigrund, Zürich
Attendance: 10,600
Referee: Georgios Kasnaferis (Greece)

6 December 2007
18:15

Spartak Moscow (Russia)	1–0	(Switzerland) Zürich
Titov 57'	Report

Luzhniki Stadium, Moscow
Attendance: 18,500
Referee: Edo Trivković (Croatia)
6 December 2007
18:15

Bayer Leverkusen (Germany)	1–0	(Czech Republic) Sparta Prague
Friedrich 71'	Report

BayArena, Leverkusen
Attendance: 17,771
Referee: Martin Atkinson (England)

19 December 2007
20:45

Zürich (Switzerland)	0–5	(Germany) Bayer Leverkusen
	Report	Greško 19'; Bulykin 23', 57'; Barnetta 50'; Kießling 80'

Letzigrund, Zürich
Attendance: 20,100
Referee: Julian Rodriguez Santiago (Spain)
19 December 2007
20:45

Toulouse (France)	2–1	(Russia) Spartak Moscow
Santos 41', 53'	Report	Dzyuba 61' (pen.)

Stadium Municipal, Toulouse
Attendance: 14,608
Referee: Espen Berntsen (Norway)

=== Group F ===
Pos	Team	Pld	W	D	L	GF	GA	GD	Pts	Qualification	BAY	BRA	BOL	ARI	RSB
1	(Germany) Bayern Munich	4	2	2	0	12	5	+7	8	Advance to knockout stage	—	—	2–2	6–0	—
2	(Portugal) Braga	4	1	3	0	5	3	+2	6	Advance to knockout stage	1–1	—	—	—	2–0
3	(England) Bolton Wanderers	4	1	3	0	5	4	+1	6	Advance to knockout stage	—	1–1	—	1–1	—
4	(Greece) Aris	4	1	2	1	5	8	−3	5		—	1–1	—	—	3–0
5	(Serbia) Red Star Belgrade	4	0	0	4	2	9	−7	0		2–3	—	0–1	—	—

25 October 2007
21:00

Bolton Wanderers (England)	1–1	(Portugal) Braga
Diouf 66'	Report	Jaílson 87'

Reebok Stadium, Horwich
Attendance: 10,848
Referee: Darko Ceferin (Slovenia)
25 October 2007
21:15

Red Star Belgrade (Serbia)	2–3	(Germany) Bayern Munich
Koroman 16'; Milijaš 74'	Report	Klose 20', 85'; Kroos 90+4'

Stadion Crvena Zvezda, Belgrade
Attendance: 30,944
Referee: Matteo Trefoloni (Italy)

8 November 2007
19:00

Bayern Munich (Germany)	2–2	(England) Bolton Wanderers
Podolski 30', 49'	Report	Gardner 8'; Davies 82'

Allianz Arena, Munich
Attendance: 66,000
Referee: Jaroslav Jára (Czech Republic)
8 November 2007
20:45

Aris (Greece)	3–0	(Serbia) Red Star Belgrade
Papazoglou 76', 89'; Koke 90'	Report

Vikelides Stadium, Thessaloniki
Attendance: 14,600
Referee: Nikolai Ivanov (Russia)

29 November 2007
21:00

Braga (Portugal)	1–1	(Germany) Bayern Munich
Linz 66'	Report	Klose 47'

Estádio Municipal, Braga
Attendance: 8,416
Referee: Jonas Eriksson (Sweden)
29 November 2007
21:00

Bolton Wanderers (England)	1–1	(Greece) Aris
Giannakopoulos 90+2'	Report	Calvo 44'

Reebok Stadium, Horwich
Attendance: 10,229
Referee: Eduardo Iturralde González (Spain)

6 December 2007
20:45

Aris (Greece)	1–1	(Portugal) Braga
Guiaro 26'	Report	Linz 6'

Vikelides Stadium, Thessaloniki
Attendance: 10,854
Referee: Robert Małek (Poland)
6 December 2007
20:45

Red Star Belgrade (Serbia)	0–1	(England) Bolton Wanderers
	Report	McCann 45'

Stadion Crvena Zvezda, Belgrade
Attendance: 30,689
Referee: Paul Allaerts (Belgium)

19 December 2007
20:45

Braga (Portugal)	2–0	(Serbia) Red Star Belgrade
Linz 11'; Wender 66'	Report

Estádio Municipal, Braga
Attendance: 8,300
Referee: Vladimír Hriňák (Slovakia)
19 December 2007
20:45

Bayern Munich (Germany)	6–0	(Greece) Aris
Toni 25', 38', 64', 66'; Lell 78'; Lahm 81'	Report

Allianz Arena, Munich
Attendance: 64,000
Referee: Alon Yefet (Israel)

=== Group G ===
Pos	Team	Pld	W	D	L	GF	GA	GD	Pts	Qualification	GET	TOT	AND	AAB	HTA
1	(Spain) Getafe	4	3	0	1	7	5	+2	9	Advance to knockout stage	—	—	2–1	—	1–2
2	(England) Tottenham Hotspur	4	2	1	1	7	5	+2	7	Advance to knockout stage	1–2	—	—	3–2	—
3	(Belgium) Anderlecht	4	1	2	1	5	4	+1	5	Advance to knockout stage	—	1–1	—	—	2–0
4	(Denmark) AaB	4	1	1	2	7	7	0	4		1–2	—	1–1	—	—
5	(Israel) Hapoel Tel Aviv	4	1	0	3	3	8	−5	3		—	0–2	—	1–3	—

25 October 2007
20:45

Anderlecht (Belgium)	2–0	(Israel) Hapoel Tel Aviv
Frutos 36', 70'	Report

Constant Vanden Stock Stadium, Brussels
Attendance: 16,586
Referee: Alexandru Tudor (Romania)
25 October 2007
21:00 (Note: Kick off postponed by 15 minutes due to traffic congestion)

Tottenham Hotspur (England)	1–2	(Spain) Getafe
Defoe 19'	Report	De la Red 21'; Braulio 70'

White Hart Lane, London
Attendance: 26,122
Referee: Knut Kircher (Germany)

8 November 2007
17:00

Hapoel Tel Aviv (Israel)	0–2	(England) Tottenham Hotspur
	Report	Keane 26'; Berbatov 31'

Bloomfield Stadium, Tel Aviv
Attendance: 9,722
Referee: Grzegorz Gilewski (Poland)
8 November 2007
19:15

AaB (Denmark)	1–1	(Belgium) Anderlecht
Lindström 86'	Report	Jakobsen 59' (o.g.)

Aalborg Stadion, Aalborg
Attendance: 10,634
Referee: Laurent Duhamel (France)

29 November 2007
20:45

Getafe (Spain)	1–2	(Israel) Hapoel Tel Aviv
Pablo 90' (pen.)	Report	Badir 5'; Dego 31'

Coliseum Alfonso Pérez, Getafe
Attendance: 4,025
Referee: Costas Kapitanis (Cyprus)
29 November 2007
20:45

Tottenham Hotspur (England)	3–2	(Denmark) AaB
Berbatov 45'; Malbranque 51'; Bent 66'	Report	Enevoldsen 2'; Risgård 37'

White Hart Lane, London
Attendance: 29,758
Referee: Pedro Proença (Portugal)

6 December 2007
20:45

AaB (Denmark)	1–2	(Spain) Getafe
Prica 90'	Report	Hernández 11'; Granero 78'

Aalborg Stadion, Aalborg
Attendance: 10,634
Referee: Nicola Rizzoli (Italy)
6 December 2007
20:45

Anderlecht (Belgium)	1–1	(England) Tottenham Hotspur
Goor 68'	Report	Berbatov 71' (pen.)

Constant Vanden Stock Stadium, Brussels
Attendance: 19,753
Referee: Damir Skomina (Slovenia)

19 December 2007
20:45

Getafe (Spain)	2–1	(Belgium) Anderlecht
Hernández 6'; Celestini 50'	Report	Théréau 90'

Coliseum Alfonso Pérez, Getafe
Attendance: 4,018
Referee: Nikolai Ivanov (Russia)
19 December 2007
20:45

Hapoel Tel Aviv (Israel)	1–3	(Denmark) AaB
Fábio Júnior 45'	Report	Risgård 27'; Jakobsen 50' (pen.); Enevoldsen 66'

Bloomfield Stadium, Tel Aviv
Attendance: 1,692
Referee: Jan Wegereef (Netherlands)

=== Group H ===
Pos	Team	Pld	W	D	L	GF	GA	GD	Pts	Qualification	BDX	HEL	GAL	PAN	AUS
1	(France) Bordeaux	4	4	0	0	9	5	+4	12	Advance to knockout stage	—	2–1	2–1	—	—
2	(Sweden) Helsingborgs IF	4	2	1	1	8	5	+3	7	Advance to knockout stage	—	—	—	1–1	3–0
3	(Turkey) Galatasaray	4	1	1	2	6	5	+1	4	Advance to knockout stage	—	2–3	—	—	0–0
4	(Greece) Panionios	4	1	1	2	4	7	−3	4		2–3	—	0–3	—	—
5	Austria Wien	4	0	1	3	1	6	−5	1		1–2	—	—	0–1	—

25 October 2007
18:00

Helsingborgs IF (Sweden)	1–1	(Greece) Panionios
Larsson 83'	Report	Goundoulakis 45'

Olympia, Helsingborg
Attendance: 6,451
Referee: Edo Trivković (Croatia)
25 October 2007
19:00

Bordeaux (France)	2–1	(Turkey) Galatasaray
Cavenaghi 53'; Chamakh 64'	Report	Nonda 22' (pen.)

Stade Chaban-Delmas, Bordeaux
Attendance: 10,863
Referee: Robert Małek (Poland)

8 November 2007
19:00

Galatasaray (Turkey)	2–3	(Sweden) Helsingborgs IF
Nonda 45', 90'	Report	Larsson 31'; Omotoyossi 39'; C. Andersson 75'

Ali Sami Yen Stadium, Istanbul
Attendance: 11,622
Referee: Mike Dean (England)
8 November 2007
20:15

Austria Wien	1–2	(France) Bordeaux
Kuljić 5'	Report	Chamakh 45'; Wendel 88' (pen.)

Ernst-Happel-Stadion, Vienna
Attendance: 20,100
Referee: Pedro Proença (Portugal)

29 November 2007
20:00

Panionios (Greece)	0–3	(Turkey) Galatasaray
	Report	Serkan 50'; Song 63' (pen.); Hakan Ş. 82'

Nea Smyrni Stadium, Athens
Attendance: 4,986
Referee: Alberto Undiano Mallenco (Spain)
29 November 2007
20:15

Helsingborgs IF (Sweden)	3–0	Austria Wien
Skúlason 47'; Omotoyossi 66', 70'	Report

Olympia, Helsingborg
Attendance: 8,243
Referee: Anton Genov (Bulgaria)

6 December 2007
20:45

Austria Wien	0–1	(Greece) Panionios
	Report	Majstorović 90'

Ernst-Happel-Stadion, Vienna
Attendance: 12,100
Referee: Jacek Granat (Poland)
6 December 2007
20:45

Bordeaux (France)	2–1	(Sweden) Helsingborgs IF
Chamakh 12'; Jussiê 69'	Report	Larsson 17'

Stade Chaban-Delmas, Bordeaux
Attendance: 9,357
Referee: Florian Meyer (Germany)

19 December 2007
20:45

Panionios (Greece)	2–3	(France) Bordeaux
Djebbour 6' (pen.); Makos 20'	Report	Cavenaghi 39'; Trémoulinas 75'; Moimbe 87'

Nea Smyrni Stadium, Athens
Attendance: 4,239
Referee: Zsolt Szabó (Hungary)
19 December 2007
20:45

Galatasaray (Turkey)	0–0	Austria Wien
	Report

Ali Sami Yen Stadium, Istanbul
Attendance: 7,320
Referee: Ruud Bossen (Netherlands)
