= Pascal Chimbonda =

French footballer (born 1979)

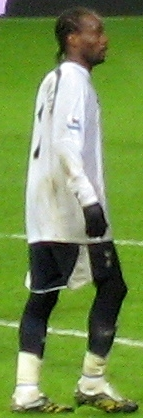
- Chimbonda playing for Tottenham Hotspur in 2007

Personal information
- Full name: Pascal Chimbonda
- Date of birth: 21 February 1979 (age 47)
- Place of birth: Les Abymes, Guadeloupe
- Height: 1.82 m (6 ft 0 in)
- Position: Right-back

Senior career*
Years	Team	Apps	(Gls)
1998–2000	Le Havre B	24	(1)
1999–2003	Le Havre	85	(5)
2003–2005	Bastia	67	(4)
2005–2006	Wigan Athletic	38	(2)
2006–2008	Tottenham Hotspur	65	(3)
2008–2009	Sunderland	13	(0)
2009	Tottenham Hotspur	3	(0)
2009–2011	Blackburn Rovers	30	(1)
2011	Queens Park Rangers	3	(0)
2011–2012	Doncaster Rovers	16	(0)
2013	Market Drayton Town	0	(0)
2013–2014	Carlisle United	26	(0)
2014–2015	Arles-Avignon	6	(0)
2017–2018	Washington	3	(0)
2019	Ashton Town	4	(0)
2024	Skelmersdale United	12	(0)

International career
2003–2012	Guadeloupe	6	(0)
2006	France	1	(0)

Managerial career
- 2023–2024: Skelmersdale United
Medal record
Men's football
Representing France
FIFA World Cup
Runner-up	2006
- * Club domestic league appearances and goals

Pascal Chimbonda (born 21 February 1979) is a French football coach and professional player who most recently was the player-manager of English non-league club Skelmersdale United.

Chimbonda, a right-back, began his professional career in 1998 with Le Havre, where he featured over 100 times combined for the club's first team and B team before moving to Bastia in 2003. In 2005, he moved to Premier League club Wigan Athletic for their debut season in the top flight. He earned a place in that season's Premier League Team of the Year, but on the last day of the 2005–06 season, he handed in a transfer request. He was subsequently signed by Tottenham Hotspur that summer. After two seasons with Spurs he later moved on to fellow Premier League club Sunderland before briefly returning to Spurs in 2009. In the summer of 2009, he signed for Blackburn Rovers, where he remained until 2011, when he joined Football Championship club Queens Park Rangers. During the 2011–12 season, he was one of a number of former Premier League players who played for Doncaster Rovers, but he went on to be released at the end of the season. Having remained without a club for the following year, Chimbonda dropped down six leagues to sign non-contract terms with Market Drayton Town, remaining with them only briefly before joining Carlisle. He retired following a short stint with AC Arles-Avignon. In 2017, he came out of retirement and spent two spells with English non-League sides Washington and Ashton Town.

Despite initially playing his international football for Guadeloupe, Chimbonda went on to be selected for the France squad for the 2006 World Cup. He was an unused substitute in each of France's matches, including the final, in which they lost on a penalty shoot-out to Italy. His only France cap came in a World Cup warm-up match against Denmark.

Chimbonda agreed to manage Skelmersdale United in October 2023. In January 2024, Chimbonda was registered as a player for Skelmersdale United, following a three-match touchline ban by the FA. He was relieved of his duties on 4 May 2024, after Skelmersdale United was relegated.

== Club career ==
=== Early career ===
Chimbonda was born in Les Abymes, Guadeloupe. He began his career at Le Havre in France in 1999, making his debut against Strasbourg on 29 April 2000. He spent four years with the club, until Le Havre were relegated to Ligue 2, when he transferred to Bastia. During his stay at Bastia, Chimbonda received racist taunts from his own fans after a heavy loss against Saint-Étienne; this may have contributed to his leaving the club. However, his former teammates at Bastia firmly denied Chimbonda's accusations of racism.

After Bastia were relegated in July 2005, he left the club, turning down an offer from Marseille, and moved to Wigan Athletic for £500,000 on a three-year contract. He cited the fact that he was "ready for a new challenge and coming to Wigan is the perfect opportunity to test myself against the best players in the world" as the reason for selecting Wigan Athletic.

=== Wigan Athletic ===
After signing for Wigan Athletic, Chimbonda was one of the stars of the Latics' first ever season in the Premier League. He played 44 times for the club in all competitions and featured in all but one game of the 2005–06 Premier League season. He scored two goals for the club, both in the 2005–06 season, in consecutive league games against Fulham and Portsmouth. After a hugely successful first season in English football, Chimbonda was named in the PFA Team of the Year for the 2005–06 season, having been voted as best right back in the Premiership, ahead of Gary Neville, Steve Finnan and Paulo Ferreira. Whilst at Wigan he started in the 2006 Football League Cup Final.

He was linked with a move to a range of clubs and was subject to an offer from West Ham United based on a clause in his contract that allowed him to switch clubs for an offer of £1 million – which was subsequently renegotiated and removed. On the final day of the 2005–06 season, he handed in a transfer request after Wigan lost 4–2 to Arsenal in the final game played at Arsenal's old Highbury ground, only six months after renegotiating his contract for a further four years. This riled the Wigan management, who set a high price – higher than many prospective buyers were willing to pay – and informed Chimbonda that he could "play in the reserves until his contract is over", if he was not bought.

Tottenham Hotspur replied with a £2 million transfer offer and then a £3 million offer; however, both were rejected, as Wigan had stated that any offers below £6 million would not be accepted, despite previously stating that, according to his agent Willie McKay, "they wouldn't step in the player's way if a top club came in for him". Further, according to McKay, £3 million "was a terrific offer", and Chimbonda was still hopeful of a move to Tottenham. Chimbonda has stated that "moving to Tottenham will help me take the next step forward", and has called Wigan a "stepping stone". West Ham also made a bid, reportedly £4 million, for the player, though this was also turned down because it fell short of the asking price.

He made his last appearance for Wigan on 26 August 2006 in a win against Reading as a substitute. He replaced Emile Heskey in the 79th minute, Heskey having scored the winning goal earlier. He eventually joined Tottenham on transfer deadline day, 31 August 2006, after a summer of negotiations.

=== Tottenham Hotspur ===
On 31 August 2006, Wigan Athletic accepted a bid from Tottenham Hotspur of £4.5 million, with the transfer being completed just before midnight. He made his Tottenham debut against Manchester United on 9 September 2006.

Chimbonda played in a 2–1 victory over Chelsea in which it later transpired he had played on with knee ligament damage resulting from a strong challenge by Frank Lampard in the opening minutes of the game. Tottenham manager Martin Jol singled out Chimbonda after the match as the best example of the players' spirit and character that day. However, on 14 January 2007 Chimbonda was involved in a controversial incident in his team's match against Newcastle United when he slapped Nicky Butt in the face with his glove; an incident that provoked a skirmish between the members of the two teams.

He scored the equaliser, and his first goal for Tottenham on 20 January 2007 in the 1–1 draw with Fulham. He started for Spurs in the 2008 Football League Cup Final victory over Chelsea. On 12 March 2008, he missed an important penalty kick in a penalty shoot-out, following a series of penalties at the end of the match with PSV Eindhoven in the UEFA Cup. PSV went to the next round (quarter finals) and Tottenham were knocked out.

=== Sunderland ===
On 26 July 2008, Chimbonda signed for Sunderland, joining up with former teammates Teemu Tainio and Steed Malbranque.

=== Return to Tottenham Hotspur ===
On 26 January 2009, Chimbonda underwent a medical at Tottenham Hotspur ahead of a proposed return to White Hart Lane and the deal was completed the following day. Sunderland manager Ricky Sbragia declined to reveal the fee, although it is thought that Sunderland would recoup what they originally paid for Chimbonda, somewhere around the £3 million mark. His second Tottenham debut came in a 3–2 defeat against Bolton Wanderers on 31 January, where he set up Darren Bent to pull one back for Spurs, after coming on as a substitute. He was cup-tied for Spurs' appearance in the 2009 Football League Cup Final. During this second spell with Tottenham he appeared in 5 games in all competitions including playing in three league matches, and the other two matches he featured in were in the UEFA Cup.

=== Blackburn Rovers ===
On 27 August 2009, Chimbonda joined Blackburn Rovers on a two-year contract for an undisclosed fee, believed to be in the region of £2.5 million. He made his debut against West Ham United on 29 August, in the 0–0 draw. On 18 October 2009, Chimbonda scored his first goal for the club in the East Lancashire derby against Burnley at Ewood Park in the 3–2 victory. At the end of this season, Chimbonda made 29 appearances, and scored one goal in all competitions. In January 2011 Blackburn Rovers agreed to terminate Chimbonda's contract with immediate effect.

=== Queens Park Rangers ===
On 21 January 2011, Chimbonda signed for Queens Park Rangers on a six-month contract, reportedly taking a 75% pay cut to join. Chimbonda made his debut against Nottingham Forest coming on as a substitute on the 73rd minute. On 21 April 2011 it was confirmed that Chimbonda was to be released by Queens Park Rangers and would not play for the club again after manager Neil Warnock stated that the club was not prepared to offer him a long-term deal.

=== Doncaster Rovers ===
On 28 September 2011, Chimbonda signed a short-term deal with Championship club Doncaster Rovers. Upon signing for Rovers, Chimbonda joined his sixth English club, and became manager Dean Saunders' first signing at the club. He made his debut on 18 October, against Blackpool, but five games later suffered an injury which kept him out for the rest of 2011. On 29 December, Chimbonda signed a new six-month contract at Keepmoat Stadium, meaning he would stay until the end of the season.

=== Later career ===
After leaving Doncaster Rovers at the end of the 2011–12 season, Chimbonda played no part in the following season. A move to Chicago Fire fell through, and he remained a free agent throughout the entire 2012–13 season. In July 2013 Chimbonda began training with Northern Premier League Division One South side Market Drayton Town and played in the club's pre-season friendly with Notts County. He also played on trial for League One side Tranmere Rovers. After failing to earn a deal with Tranmere, Chimbonda returned to Market Drayton on a non-contract basis, also announcing that he would play for free.

On 18 October 2013, Chimbonda signed a three-month contract with League One side Carlisle United.

On 1 October 2014, Chimbonda signed with French Ligue 2 side AC Arles-Avignon. He was released in February 2015 having played four games in Ligue 2, scoring no goals and receiving three yellow cards. Chimbonda initially retired from playing following his release by Arles-Avignon.

On 5 October 2017, Chimbonda came out of retirement and signed with non-league side Washington.

In January 2019, Chimbonda signed a one-month contract with Ashton Town of the North West Counties League Division One North. He made his Ashton Town debut in a 6–2 home victory over Bacup Borough. He left the club in March having made four appearances.

== International career ==
=== Guadeloupe ===
In 2003, he played three matches for Guadeloupe in the Caribbean qualifiers for the 2003 CONCACAF Gold Cup.

In 2012, he represented Guadeloupe during qualifications to the 2012 Caribbean Cup (Second Round, Group 7), playing in games against Martinique, Puerto Rico and Dominican Republic.

=== France ===
Despite early concerns that he would not make France's 2006 World Cup squad, he was selected on the quality of his performances for Wigan in the Premier League. During a World Cup warm-up friendly match, a 2–0 win against Denmark on 31 May 2006, he appeared amongst the substitutes, appearing briefly on the pitch in the final minutes of the game in the 87th minute for his debut. Chimbonda did not make an appearance during the 2006 World Cup, the cap against Denmark was his only appearance for the national side.

== Managerial career ==
In October 2023, Chimbonda was appointed manager of non-league team Skelmersdale United. He said he wanted to be an inspiration to black managers. On 30 January 2024, having registered himself as a player earlier in the month, Chimbonda made his debut for Skelmersdale United in a 2-2 home draw versus Charnock Richard FC in the North West Counties League Premier Division.

== Career statistics ==
=== Club ===
As of 15 February 2024

Appearances and goals by club, season and competition
Club	Season	League			National cup (Note: Includes Coupe de France, FA Cup)		League cup (Note: Includes Coupe de la Ligue, Football League Cup)		Continental		Total	
Club	Season	Division	Apps	Goals	Apps	Goals	Apps	Goals	Apps	Goals	Apps	Goals
Le Havre II	1998-99	Championnat de France Amateur	3	0	–		–		–		3	0
Le Havre II	1999-2000	Championnat de France Amateur	21	1	–		–		–		21	1
Le Havre II	Total		24	1	–		–		–		24	1
Le Havre	1999-2000	Division 1	2	0	0	0	0	0	–		2	0
Le Havre	2000–01	Division 2	32	1	0	0	3	0	–		35	1
Le Havre	2001–02	Division 2	27	2	2	0	2	0	–		31	2
Le Havre	2002–03	Ligue 1	24	2	0	0	0	0	–		24	2
Le Havre	Total		85	5	2	0	5	0	–		92	5
Bastia	2003–04	Ligue 1	31	1	0	0	2	0	–		33	1
Bastia	2004–05	Ligue 1	36	3	1	0	2	0	–		39	3
Bastia	Total		67	4	1	0	4	0	–		72	4
Wigan Athletic	2005–06	Premier League	37	2	2	0	4	0	–		43	2
Wigan Athletic	2006–07	Premier League	1	0	0	0	0	0	–		1	0
Wigan Athletic	Total		38	2	2	0	4	0	–		44	2
Tottenham Hotspur	2006–07	Premier League	33	1	4	0	2	0	10 (Note: Appearances in the UEFA Cup)	0	47	1
Tottenham Hotspur	2007–08	Premier League	32	2	2	0	6	1	9	0	49	3
Tottenham Hotspur	Total		65	3	6	0	8	1	19	0	98	4
Sunderland	2008–09	Premier League	13	0	2	0	1	0	–		16	0
Tottenham Hotspur	2008–09	Premier League	3	0	0	0	0	0	2	0	5	0
Blackburn Rovers	2009–10	Premier League	24	1	1	0	4	0	–		29	1
Blackburn Rovers	2010–11	Premier League	6	0	0	0	2	0	–		8	0
Blackburn Rovers	Total		30	1	1	0	6	0	–		37	1
Queens Park Rangers	2010–11	Championship	3	0	0	0	0	0	–		3	0
Doncaster Rovers	2011–12	Championship	16	0	0	0	0	0	–		16	0
Market Drayton Town	2012–13	Northern Premier League Division 1 South	0	0	–		–		–		0	0
Carlisle United	2013–14	League One	26	0	2	0	0	0	–		28	0
Arlésien	2014–15	Ligue 2	4	0	2	0	0	0	–		6	0
Washington	2017–18	Northern Premier League Division 1	3	0	–		–		–		3	0
Ashton Town	2018–19	North West Counties Football League Division 1 North	4	0	–		–		–		4	0
Skelmersdale United	2023–24	North West Counties Football League Premier Division	4	0	–		–		–		4	0
Career total			385	16	18	0	28	1	21	0	452	17

=== International ===
Appearances and goals by national team and year
National team	Year	Apps	Goals
Guadeloupe	2003	3	0
Guadeloupe	2012	3	0
France	2006	1	0
Total		7	0

== Honours ==
Wigan Athletic

- Football League Cup runner-up: 2005–06

Tottenham Hotspur

- Football League Cup: 2007–08

France

- FIFA World Cup runner-up: 2006

Individual

- PFA Team of the Year: 2005–06 Premier League
