= Serkan Çalık =

Turkish-German footballer

Personal information
- Date of birth: 15 March 1986 (age 40)
- Place of birth: Dinslaken, West Germany
- Height: 1.67 m (5 ft 6 in)
- Positions: Right winger; second striker

Team information
- Current team: BV Osterfeld
- Number: 29

Youth career
- TV Jahn Hiesfeld
- VfB Lohberg
- MSV Duisburg
- –2004: Borussia Mönchengladbach
- 2004–2005: Rot-Weiss Essen

Senior career*
Years	Team	Apps	(Gls)
2005–2007	Rot-Weiss Essen	55	(5)
2007–2010	Galatasaray	17	(3)
2010–2012	Gençlerbirliği	39	(4)
2012	→ Kayseri Erciyesspor (loan)	6	(1)
2012–2013	Şanlıurfaspor	0	(0)
2013–2014	Samsunspor	37	(1)
2014–2015	Yeni Malatyaspor	31	(5)
2015–2016	Sarıyer	32	(3)
2016–2017	Kırklarelispor	15	(5)
2017	Menemen Belediyespor	15	(0)
2017–2018	Silivrispor	13	(0)
2018	Eyüpspor	13	(7)
2018–2019	Fatsa Belediyespor	24	(3)
Total		297	(37)

International career
2007–2008	Germany U21	5	(1)
2008	Turkey U21	1	(0)
- * Club domestic league appearances and goals

Serkan Çalık (born 15 March 1986) is a Turkish-German former professional footballer who played as a right winger or second striker.

== Club career ==
Çalık was born in Dinslaken, West Germany.

Çalık joined for Galatasaray from 2. Bundesliga club Rot-Weiss Essen in June 2007.

Çalık wore the number 61 shirt, which corresponds to the car number plate location codes for Trabzon, Turkey, where his parents are from. During his days at Galatasaray, Çalık was used as a right winger by coach Karl Heinz Feldkamp, due to his excellent acceleration and pace.

Çalık signed for Ankara club Gençlerbirliği afterwards in 2010 which was followed by brief spells at Kayseri Erciyesspor and Şanlıurfaspor.

Çalık retired in summer 2019.

== International career ==
Çalık has dual Turkish-German nationality and was eligible for either national team. Çalık made his debut for the Germany U-21 squad in 2007, but switched to the Turkey national team due to better prospects of being called up to the senior side.

== Honours ==
Galatasaray

- Turkish League: 2007–08
- Turkish Super Cup: 2008
