= Robert Małek =

Polish football referee (born 1971)

- Born: 15 March 1971 (age 55); Zabrze, Poland

Domestic
Years	League	Role
1998–2013	Ekstraklasa	Referee

International
Years	League	Role
2001–2013	FIFA listed	Referee

Robert Małek (born 15 March 1971) is a Polish former football referee who was active internationally from 2001 to 2013.

He served as a referee in 2010 World Cup qualifiers.
