= Koné (surname) =

Koné (KOH-nay), also spelt Kone, is a surname. It is found mostly in North and West Africa, in particular Mali, Mauritania, Morocco, Burkina Faso, Ivory Coast, Guinea and France (a holdover from the French colonial empire in that region) but has also spread to North America. It is also used as a given name.

Historically, the name Koné is a clan name (or patronym) of the Mandinka and closely related Bambara peoples. It is related to another clan name, Jara/Diarra, and is heard in many of the chronicles that have been handed down orally. Both are frequently praised together in song, signifying bravery and fearlessness.

== Other derivations ==
There is also a similar German name, Köne, originating in the Old Germanic name Kuonrat (kōniz, meaning able, clever, and rēdaz, meaning help, advise.

The Indian name Kone derives from the caste name Konar. The caste name is interchangeable with the names "Konar" and "Kovalar", being derived from Tamil word Kōn, which can mean "king" and "herdsmen".

== People with the name ==
=== Surname, West African origin ===
- Aboubacar Kone (born 28 March 2001), Ivorian-born Belgian footballer
- Aboubakar Koné (disambiguation), several people
- Adama Koné (born 1987), Ivorian footballer
- Aguibou Koné, candidate in the 2013 Malian presidential election
- Alimata Koné (born 1965), Ivorian female sprinter
- Amadou Koné, Ivorian writer
- Antoine Koné (1963–2019), Ivorian Roman Catholic prelate
- Armand Koné (born 1969), Ivorian Roman Catholic prelate
- Arouna Koné (born 1983), Ivorian footballer
- Babani Koné (aka Fatoumata; born 1968), Malian composer and singer
- Bakare Kone (born 1989), Ivorian footballer
- Bakari Koné (born 1981), Ivorian footballer
- Bakary Koné (born 1988), Burkinabé footballer
- Bazoumana Koné (born 1993), Ivorian-German basketballer
- Begnon-Damien Koné (1921–1986), Burkinabé politician who served in the French Senate from 1958 to 1959
- Ben Lhassine Kone (born 2000), Ivorian footballer
- Boubacar Koné (born Aboubacar Sidiki Koné, 1984), Malian footballer
- Brahima Bruno Koné (born 1995), Ivorian footballer
- Cheick Oumar Koné (born c.1956), Malian football coach
- Diané Mariam Koné (born 1953), Malian politician
- Djakaridja Koné (born 1986), Burkinabé footballer
- Dramane Koné (born 1982), Burkinabé drummer and griot
- Drissa Kone (born 1960), Malian djembe master drummer
- Emmanuel Koné (born 1986), Ivorian footballer
- Famoussa Koné (born 1994), Malian footballer
- Fatoumata Koné (born 1988) is an Ivorian female basketball player, national team 2013
- Francis Koné (born 1990), Ivorian footballer, played for Togo
- Gaoussou Koné (born1944), Ivorian sprinter
- Gogbeu Francis Koné (born 1991), Ivorian sprinter
- Hamed Koné (born 1987), Ivorian footballer
- Ibrahim or Ibrahima Koné, several people
- Isaac Koné (born 1991), Ivorian footballer
- Ismael Koné (disambiguation), several people
- Kafougouna Koné (1944–2017), Malian politician, diplomat and military officer
- Kassim Koné (born 1986), Ivorian footballer
- Kinapeya Kone (born 1979), Ivorian judoka
- Manu Koné (born 2001), French professional footballer
- Koro Issa Ahmed Koné (born 1989), Ivorian footballer
- Lamine Koné (born 1989), Ivorian footballer
- Lanciné Koné (born 1979), Ivorian footballer
- Lompolo Koné (1921–1974), Burkinabé playwright, editor, and diplomat
- Maboundou Koné (born 1997), Ivorian runner
- Malamine Koné (born 1971), Malian and French entrepreneur
- Mamadou Koné (born 1991), Ivorian professional footballer
- Mamina Koné (born 1988), Ivorian female taekwondo athlete
- Manu Koné (born 2001), French footballer
- Mariam Koné (born 1987), Malian singer, member of Les Amazones d'Afrique
- Mariatou Koné, Ivorian academic
- Mbah Koné (born 1990), Burkinabé footballer
- Mohamed Koné (disambiguation), several people
- Mory Koné (born 1994), French footballer
- Moussa Koné (disambiguation), several people
- Oumar Koné (disambiguation), several people
- Oumou Kone (born 1999), female Malian footballer
- Ousmane Kone (born 1952), Malian politician
- Salif Koné, Malian sprinter
- Salimata Koné (born 1990), Malian footballer, played for the women's national team 2014
- Samba Koné (born 2002), Malian footballer
- Sékou Koné (born 2006), Malian footballer
- Seydou Koné (disambiguation), several people
- Sidy Koné (born 1992), also known as Sidi Koné, Malian footballer
- Sika Koné (born 2002), Malian basketball player
- Soufiane Koné (born 1980), French footballer
- Souleymane Kone (born 1996), Ivorian footballer
- Tiassé Koné (born 1981), former Ivorian international footballer
- Tiémoko Meyliet Koné (born 1949), Ivorian economist and politician, vice-president of Ivory Coast 2022
- Youssouf Koné (disambiguation), several people
- Yssouf Koné (born 1982), Burkinabé footballer
- Zoumana Koné (born 1991), Ivorian footballer

=== Other surnames ===
- Bilhal Kone (born 2002), American football player
- Bruce C. Kone (born 1958 in Germany), American nephrologist and molecular biologist
- James Kone (also spelt Kon) (born 1987), South Sudanese footballer
- Maveeran Alagumuthu Kone (1710–1759), Indian polygar who revolted against the British presence in India
- Panagiotis Kone (born Gjergji Kone in Albania, 1987), Greek former footballer

=== Given name ===
- Adama Koné Clofie (born 1967), Ivorian footballer

== See also ==
- Julius Kipyegon Kones (born 1972), Kenyan statistician and politician
- Kipkalya Kones (1952–2008), Kenyan politician
- Kone (disambiguation)
- Trent Kone-Doherty (born 2006), Irish footballer
