= 2007–08 UEFA Champions League qualifying rounds =

European football tournament

The qualifying rounds for the 2007–08 UEFA Champions League began on 17 July 2007. In total, there were three qualifying rounds which provided 16 clubs to join the group stage.

== Teams ==
Key to colours
Qualify for the group stage
Eliminated in the Third qualifying round; Advanced to the UEFA Cup first round

Third qualifying round
Team	Coeff.
(England) Liverpool	112.618
(England) Arsenal	104.618
(Spain) Valencia	99.374
(Spain) Sevilla	87.374
(Portugal) Benfica	67.107
(Netherlands) Ajax	65.995
(Germany) Werder Bremen	63.640
(Scotland) Celtic	62.064
(Italy) Lazio	51.808
(Belgium) Anderlecht	41.594
(Ukraine) Dynamo Kyiv	38.726
(Czech Republic) Sparta Prague	37.851
(Turkey) Fenerbahçe	36.791
(Greece) AEK Athens	36.415
(Romania) Dinamo București	34.255
(Russia) Spartak Moscow	27.920
(France) Toulouse	17.706
(Switzerland) Zürich	9.869

Second qualifying round
Team	Coeff.
(Romania) Steaua București	55.255
(Scotland) Rangers	47.064
(Ukraine) Shakhtar Donetsk	44.726
(Turkey) Beşiktaş	43.791
(Bulgaria) Levski Sofia	38.112
(Czech Republic) Slavia Prague	32.851
(Norway) Rosenborg	31.509
(Serbia) Red Star Belgrade	19.256
(Denmark) Copenhagen	19.129
(Belgium) Genk	15.594
(Hungary) Debrecen	11.675
(Austria) Red Bull Salzburg	9.104
(Israel) Beitar Jerusalem	6.338
(Poland) Zagłębie Lubin	5.609

First qualifying round
Team	Coeff.
(Croatia) Dinamo Zagreb	17.533
(Cyprus) APOEL	6.492
(Slovenia) Domžale	5.272
(Sweden) IF Elfsborg	4.478
(Bosnia and Herzegovina) Sarajevo	4.190
(Latvia) Ventspils	3.860
(Slovakia) Žilina	3.575
(Republic of Ireland) Derry City	3.145
(Iceland) FH	2.650
(Lithuania) Kaunas	2.420
(Finland) Tampere United	2.420
(Moldova) Sheriff Tiraspol	2.365
(Georgia (country)) Olimpi Rustavi	2.035
(North Macedonia) Pobeda	1.925
(Belarus) BATE Borisov	1.540
(Albania) Tirana	1.265
(Estonia) Levadia Tallinn	1.210
(Armenia) Pyunik	1.155
(Azerbaijan) Khazar Lankaran	1.045
(Kazakhstan) Astana	0.770
(Northern Ireland) Linfield	0.715
(Wales) The New Saints	0.660
(Faroe Islands) HB	0.550
(Luxembourg) F91 Dudelange	0.550
(Malta) Marsaxlokk	0.550
(Andorra) Rànger's	0.000
(San Marino) Murata	0.000
(Montenegro) Zeta	0.000

== First qualifying round ==
The draw was held on 29 June 2007 in Nyon, Switzerland. The draw was conducted by UEFA General Secretary David Taylor and Michele Centenaro, UEFA's head of club competitions.

=== Seeding ===
Seeded		Unseeded	
(Croatia) Dinamo Zagreb (Cyprus) APOEL (Slovenia) Domžale (Sweden) IF Elfsborg (Bosnia and Herzegovina) Sarajevo (Latvia) Ventspils (Slovakia) Žilina	(Republic of Ireland) Derry City (Iceland) FH (Lithuania) Kaunas (Finland) Tampere United (Moldova) Sheriff Tiraspol (Georgia (country)) Olimpi Rustavi (North Macedonia) Pobeda	(Belarus) BATE Borisov (Albania) Tirana (Estonia) Levadia Tallinn (Armenia) Pyunik (Azerbaijan) Khazar Lankaran (Kazakhstan) Astana (Northern Ireland) Linfield	(Wales) The New Saints (Faroe Islands) HB (Luxembourg) F91 Dudelange (Malta) Marsaxlokk (Andorra) Rànger's (San Marino) Murata (Montenegro) Zeta

=== Summary ===
The first leg matches were held on 17 July and 18 July, while the second legs were played on 24 July and 25 July 2007.

Team 1	Agg.	Team 2	1st leg	2nd leg
Khazar Lankaran (Azerbaijan)	2–4	(Croatia) Dinamo Zagreb	1–1	1–3 (a.e.t.)
APOEL (Cyprus)	2–3	(Belarus) BATE Borisov	2–0	0–3 (a.e.t.)
Sheriff Tiraspol (Moldova)	5–0	(Andorra) Rànger's	2–0	3–0
FH (Iceland)	4–1	(Faroe Islands) HB	4–1	0–0
The New Saints (Wales)	4–4 (a)	(Latvia) Ventspils	3–2	1–2
Pobeda (North Macedonia)	0–1	(Estonia) Levadia Tallinn	0–1	0–0
Olimpi Rustavi (Georgia (country))	0–3	(Kazakhstan) Astana	0–0	0–3
Zeta (Montenegro)	5–4	(Lithuania) Kaunas	3–1	2–3
Murata (San Marino)	1–4	(Finland) Tampere United	1–2	0–2
F91 Dudelange (Luxembourg)	5–7	(Slovakia) Žilina	1–2	4–5
Linfield (Northern Ireland)	0–1	(Sweden) IF Elfsborg	0–0	0–1
Derry City (Republic of Ireland)	0–2	(Armenia) Pyunik	0–0	0–2
Marsaxlokk (Malta)	1–9	(Bosnia and Herzegovina) Sarajevo	0–6	1–3
Domžale (Slovenia)	3–1	(Albania) Tirana	1–0	2–1

=== Matches ===
17 July 2007
15:00

Khazar Lankaran (Azerbaijan)	1–1	(Croatia) Dinamo Zagreb
Ramazanov 58'	Report	Etto 63'

Tofiq Bahramov Republican Stadium, Baku (Note: Khazar Lankaran played their home match at Tofiq Bahramov Republican Stadium, Baku as their regular home venue Khazar Lankaran Central Stadium in Lankaran did not meet UEFA criteria.)
Attendance: 16,000
Referee: Meir Levi (Israel)
24 July 2007
20:15

Dinamo Zagreb (Croatia)	3–1 (a.e.t.)	(Azerbaijan) Khazar Lankaran
Vugrinec 56'; Mandžukić 99'; Tadić 116'	Report	Juninho 16'

Stadion Maksimir, Zagreb
Attendance: 9,240
Referee: Bernardino González Vázquez (Spain)

Dinamo Zagreb won 4–2 on aggregate.

17 July 2007
19:00

APOEL (Cyprus)	2–0	(Belarus) BATE Borisov
Michael 42'; Machlas 61'	Report

GSP Stadium, Nicosia
Attendance: 10,971
Referee: Olivier Thual (France)
24 July 2007
18:00

BATE Borisov (Belarus)	3–0 (a.e.t.)	(Cyprus) APOEL
Stasevich 14'; Platonaw 74'; Bliznyuk 104'	Report

City Stadium, Borisov
Attendance: 5,000
Referee: Willie Collum (Scotland)

BATE Borisov won 3–2 on aggregate.

18 July 2007
18:00

Sheriff Tiraspol (Moldova)	2–0	(Andorra) Rànger's
Kuchuk 45+7'; Gorodețchi 79'	Report

Sheriff Stadium, Tiraspol
Attendance: 8,800
Referee: István Vad (Hungary)
24 July 2007
18:00

Rànger's (Andorra)	0–3	(Moldova) Sheriff Tiraspol
	Report	Balima 68'; Kajkut 77'; Suvorov 89'

Estadi Comunal d'Andorra la Vella, Andorra la Vella
Attendance: 280
Referee: Fariz Yusifov (Azerbaijan)

Sheriff Tiraspol won 5–0 on aggregate.

18 July 2007
22:00

FH (Iceland)	4–1	(Faroe Islands) HB
Bjarnason 14'; Vilhjálmsson 16', 58'; Ólafsson 52'	Report	Nielsen 44' (o.g.)

Kaplakriki, Hafnarfjörður
Attendance: 1,422
Referee: Alan Black (Northern Ireland)
25 July 2007
20:00

HB (Faroe Islands)	0–0	(Iceland) FH
	Report

Tórsvøllur, Tórshavn (Note: HB played their home match at Tórsvøllur stadium, instead of their regular home venue Gundadalur stadium.)
Attendance: 655
Referee: Petteri Kari (Finland)

FH won 4–1 on aggregate.

17 July 2007
21:30

The New Saints (Wales)	3–2	(Latvia) Ventspils
Wilde 14'; Baker 54'; Hogan 90'	Report	Rimkus 26', 89'

Latham Park, Newtown (Note: The New Saints played their home match at Latham Park in Newtown as their regular home venue Park Hall in Oswestry did not meet UEFA criteria.)
Attendance: 649
Referee: Joseph Attard (Malta)
25 July 2007
17:00

Ventspils (Latvia)	2–1	(Wales) The New Saints
Ndeki 17'; Kačanovs 53'	Report	Naylor 90+2'

Olimpiskais Stadions, Ventspils
Attendance: 2,000
Referee: Johannes Valgeirsson (Iceland)

4–4 on aggregate; Ventspils won on away goals.

18 July 2007
17:00

Pobeda (North Macedonia)	0–1	(Estonia) Levadia Tallinn
	Report	Nahk 53'

Stadion Goce Delčev, Prilep
Attendance: 3,000
Referee: Karen Nalbandyan (Armenia)
25 July 2007
17:30

Levadia Tallinn (Estonia)	0–0	(North Macedonia) Pobeda
	Report

Kadriorg Stadium, Tallinn
Attendance: 2,297
Referee: Mihály Fábián (Hungary)

Levadia Tallinn won 1–0 on aggregate.

17 July 2007
13:15

Olimpi Rustavi (Georgia (country))	0–0	(Kazakhstan) Astana
	Report

Poladi Stadium, Rustavi
Attendance: 2,900
Referee: Marcin Borski (Poland)
24 July 2007
13:30

Astana (Kazakhstan)	3–0	(Georgia (country)) Olimpi Rustavi
Kuchma 12'; Tlekhugov 55'; Zhalmagambetov 84'	Report

Central Stadium, Kostanay (Note: Astana played their home matches at Central Stadium in Kostanay as their regular home venue Kazhymukan Munaitpasov Stadium in Astana did not meet UEFA criteria.)
Attendance: 6,000
Referee: Veaceslav Banari (Moldova)

Astana won 3–0 on aggregate.

17 July 2007
20:30

Zeta (Montenegro)	3–1	(Lithuania) Kaunas
Korać 34' (pen.); Tumbasević 36'; Stjepanović 59'	Report	Kvaratskhelia 68'

City Stadium, Podgorica (Note: Zeta played their home matches at City Stadium, Podgorica as their regular home venue Stadion Trešnjica in Golubovci did not meet UEFA criteria.)
Attendance: 5,000
Referee: Björn Kuipers (Netherlands)
24 July 2007
19:00

Kaunas (Lithuania)	3–2	(Montenegro) Zeta
Beniušis 6'; Kvaratskhelia 16'; Kšanavičius 20'	Report	Stjepanović 34'; Ćetković 89'

Darius and Girėnas Stadium, Kaunas
Attendance: 1,500
Referee: Richard Havrilla (Slovakia)

Zeta won 5–4 on aggregate.

17 July 2007
21:00

Murata (San Marino)	1–2	(Finland) Tampere United
Protti 43'	Report	Niemi 68', 88'

Stadio Olimpico, Serravalle
Attendance: 2,686
Referee: Aleksandar Stavrev (Macedonia)
25 July 2007
18:00

Tampere United (Finland)	2–0	(San Marino) Murata
Petrescu 7'; Niemi 21'	Report

Tampere Stadium, Tampere
Attendance: 5,638
Referee: Luc Wilmes (Luxembourg)

Tampere United won 4–1 on aggregate.

18 July 2007
19:00

F91 Dudelange (Luxembourg)	1–2	(Slovakia) Žilina
Di Gregorio 45' (pen.)	Report	Jež 48' (pen.); Lietava 73'

Stade Jos Nosbaum, Dudelange
Attendance: 1,221
Referee: Alexander Gonchar (Russia)
25 July 2007
20:00

Žilina (Slovakia)	5–4	(Luxembourg) F91 Dudelange
Devátý 8'; Lietava 11'; Štyvar 29', 75'; Vomáčka 66'	Report	Di Gregorio 40'; Hammami 49'; Guthleber 71'; Lukić 82'

Štadión pod Dubňom, Žilina
Attendance: 5,822
Referee: Paolo Paraty da Silva (Portugal)

Žilina won 7–5 on aggregate.

17 July 2007
20:45

Linfield (Northern Ireland)	0–0	(Sweden) IF Elfsborg
	Report

Windsor Park, Belfast
Attendance: 2,009
Referee: Paolo Tagliavento (Italy)
25 July 2007
19:00

IF Elfsborg (Sweden)	1–0	(Northern Ireland) Linfield
M. Svensson 32'	Report

Borås Arena, Borås
Attendance: 1,023
Referee: Felix Brych (Germany)

IF Elfsborg won 1–0 on aggregate.

18 July 2007
21:45

Derry City (Republic of Ireland)	0–0	(Armenia) Pyunik
	Report

Brandywell Stadium, Derry
Attendance: 2,285
Referee: Stelios Trifonos (Cyprus)
25 July 2007
17:00

Pyunik (Armenia)	2–0	(Republic of Ireland) Derry City
Avetisyan 28'; Ghazaryan 67'	Report

Vazgen Sargsyan Republican Stadium, Yerevan
Attendance: 5,300
Referee: Robert Krajnc (Slovenia)

Pyunik won 2–0 on aggregate.

18 July 2007
20:00

Marsaxlokk (Malta)	0–6	(Bosnia and Herzegovina) Sarajevo
	Report	Raščić 5', 9'; Obuća 20', 65'; Maksimović 42'; Bučan 87'

Ta' Qali National Stadium, Ta' Qali
Attendance: 321
Referee: Mario Vlk (Slovakia)
24 July 2007
20:00

Sarajevo (Bosnia and Herzegovina)	3–1	(Malta) Marsaxlokk
Mešić 42'; Šaraba 60'; Turković 76'	Report	Frendo 65'

Asim Ferhatović Hase Stadium, Sarajevo
Attendance: 5,000
Referee: Stanislav Todorov (Bulgaria)

Sarajevo won 9–1 on aggregate.

18 July 2007
20:15

Domžale (Slovenia)	1–0	(Albania) Tirana
Janković 44'	Report

Sports Park, Domžale
Attendance: 824
Referee: Martin Atkinson (England)
25 July 2007
20:30

Tirana (Albania)	1–2	(Slovenia) Domžale
K. Duro 74'	Report	Ljubijankić 30', 77'

Qemal Stafa Stadium, Tirana
Attendance: 7,000
Referee: Mechalis Germanakos (Greece)

Domžale won 3–1 on aggregate.

== Second qualifying round ==
The draw was held on 29 June 2007 in Nyon, Switzerland. The draw was conducted by UEFA General Secretary David Taylor and Michele Centenaro, UEFA's head of club competitions.

=== Seeding ===
Seeded		Unseeded	
(Romania) Steaua București (Scotland) Rangers (Ukraine) Shakhtar Donetsk (Turkey) Beşiktaş (Bulgaria) Levski Sofia (Czech Republic) Slavia Prague (Norway) Rosenborg	(Serbia) Red Star Belgrade (Denmark) Copenhagen (Croatia) Dinamo Zagreb (Belgium) Genk (Hungary) Debrecen (Austria) Red Bull Salzburg (Belarus) BATE Borisov	(Israel) Beitar Jerusalem (Poland) Zagłębie Lubin (Slovenia) Domžale (Sweden) IF Elfsborg (Bosnia and Herzegovina) Sarajevo (Latvia) Ventspils (Slovakia) Žilina	(Armenia) Pyunik (Iceland) FH (Montenegro) Zeta (Finland) Tampere United (Moldova) Sheriff Tiraspol (Kazakhstan) Astana (Estonia) Levadia Tallinn

Notes

1. ^{†} Winners of the previous qualifying round whose identity was not known at the time of the draw. Teams in italics defeated a team with a higher coefficient in the previous qualifying round, thus effectively taking the coefficient of their defeated opponent in the draw for this round.

=== Summary ===
The first leg matches were played on 31 July and 1 August, while the second legs were played on 7 August and 8 August 2007.

Team 1	Agg.	Team 2	1st leg	2nd leg
Pyunik (Armenia)	1–4	(Ukraine) Shakhtar Donetsk	0–2	1–2
Red Star Belgrade (Serbia)	2–2 (a)	(Estonia) Levadia Tallinn	1–0	1–2
Rangers (Scotland)	3–0	(Montenegro) Zeta	2–0	1–0
Debrecen (Hungary)	0–1	(Sweden) IF Elfsborg	0–1	0–0
Zagłębie Lubin (Poland)	1–3	(Romania) Steaua București	0–1	1–2
Genk (Belgium)	2–2 (a)	(Bosnia and Herzegovina) Sarajevo	1–2	1–0
Ventspils (Latvia)	0–7	(Austria) Red Bull Salzburg	0–3	0–4
Astana (Kazakhstan)	2–10	(Norway) Rosenborg	1–3	1–7
FH (Iceland)	2–4	(Belarus) BATE Borisov	1–3	1–1
Copenhagen (Denmark)	2–1	(Israel) Beitar Jerusalem	1–0	1–1 (a.e.t.)
Žilina (Slovakia)	0–0 (3–4 p)	(Czech Republic) Slavia Prague	0–0	0–0 (a.e.t.)
Tampere United (Finland)	2–0	(Bulgaria) Levski Sofia	1–0	1–0
Domžale (Slovenia)	2–5	(Croatia) Dinamo Zagreb	1–2	1–3
Beşiktaş (Turkey)	4–0	(Moldova) Sheriff Tiraspol	1–0	3–0

=== Matches ===
31 July 2007
17:00

Pyunik (Armenia)	0–2	(Ukraine) Shakhtar Donetsk
	Report	Hladkyy 45'; Brandão 48'

Vazgen Sargsyan Republican Stadium, Yerevan
Attendance: 8,000
Referee: Stefan Messner (Austria)
8 August 2007
19:00

Shakhtar Donetsk (Ukraine)	2–1	(Armenia) Pyunik
Brandão 40'; Hladkyy 49'	Report	Ghazaryan 31'

RSC Olimpiyskiy, Donetsk
Attendance: 18,000
Referee: João Lopes Ferreira (Portugal)

Shakhtar Donetsk won 4–1 on aggregate.

1 August 2007
20:15

Red Star Belgrade (Serbia)	1–0	(Estonia) Levadia Tallinn
Koroman 35'	Report

Red Star Stadium, Belgrade
Attendance: 18,886
Referee: Bernhard Brugger (Austria)
8 August 2007
17:00

Levadia Tallinn (Estonia)	2–1	(Serbia) Red Star Belgrade
Malov 43'; Nahk 67'	Report	Burzanović 37'

Kadriorg Stadium, Tallinn
Attendance: 3,600
Referee: Carlos Megía Dávila (Spain)

2–2 on aggregate; Red Star Belgrade won on away goals.

31 July 2007
21:05

Rangers (Scotland)	2–0	(Montenegro) Zeta
Weir 55'; McCulloch 73'	Report

Ibrox Stadium, Glasgow
Attendance: 36,145
Referee: Georgios Kasnaferis (Greece)
7 August 2007
20:05

Zeta (Montenegro)	0–1	(Scotland) Rangers
	Report	Beasley 81'

City Stadium, Podgorica
Attendance: 9,000
Referee: Paolo Dondarini (Italy)

Rangers won 3–0 on aggregate.

31 July 2007
20:45

Debrecen (Hungary)	0–1	(Sweden) IF Elfsborg
	Report	Mobaeck 65'

Stadion Oláh Gábor Út, Debrecen
Attendance: 10,000
Referee: Sten Kaldma (Estonia)
8 August 2007
19:00

IF Elfsborg (Sweden)	0–0	(Hungary) Debrecen
	Report

Borås Arena, Borås
Attendance: 11,952
Referee: Claudio Circhetta (Switzerland)

IF Elfsborg won 1–0 on aggregate.

31 July 2007
20:45

Zagłębie Lubin (Poland)	0–1	(Romania) Steaua București
	Report	Goian 55'

Stadion Zagłębia, Lubin
Attendance: 7,300
Referee: Selçuk Dereli (Turkey)
8 August 2007
19:30

Steaua București (Romania)	2–1	(Poland) Zagłębie Lubin
Nicoliță 37'; Zaharia 83'	Report	Stasiak 29'

Stadionul Steaua, Bucharest
Attendance: 16,287
Referee: Mark Clattenburg (England)

Steaua București won 3–1 on aggregate.

31 July 2007
20:30

Genk (Belgium)	1–2	(Bosnia and Herzegovina) Sarajevo
Cornelis 28'	Report	Raščić 15'; Muharemović 86'

Cristal Arena, Genk
Attendance: 11,090
Referee: Igor Egorov (Russia)
8 August 2007
19:30

Sarajevo (Bosnia and Herzegovina)	0–1	(Belgium) Genk
	Report	Mikulić 58'

Asim Ferhatović Hase Stadium, Sarajevo
Attendance: 32,000
Referee: Alexandru Tudor (Romania)

2–2 on aggregate; Sarajevo won on away goals.

1 August 2007
18:00

Ventspils (Latvia)	0–3	(Austria) Red Bull Salzburg
	Report	Aufhauser 20', 27', 83' (pen.)

Skonto Stadium, Riga (Note: Ventspils played their Second round home match at Skonto Stadium in Riga as their regular home venue Olimpiskais Stadions, Ventspils did not meet UEFA criteria.)
Attendance: 4,000
Referee: Ruud Bossen (Netherlands)
8 August 2007
20:30

Red Bull Salzburg (Austria)	4–0	(Latvia) Ventspils
Aufhauser 9'; Dudić 48'; Ilić 77'; Leitgeb 90+2'	Report

Red Bull Arena, Salzburg
Attendance: 11,665
Referee: Espen Berntsen (Norway)

Red Bull Salzburg won 7–0 on aggregate.

1 August 2007
15:00

Astana (Kazakhstan)	1–3	(Norway) Rosenborg
Kuchma 30'	Report	Koné 6', 67'; Iversen 63'

Central Stadium, Kostanay
Attendance: 7,000
Referee: Serge Gumienny (Belgium)
8 August 2007
20:45

Rosenborg (Norway)	7–1	(Kazakhstan) Astana
Koné 1', 33'; Iversen 7'; Traoré 17', 50', 53'; Sapara 62'	Report	Suchkov 22'

Lerkendal Stadion, Trondheim
Attendance: 12,827
Referee: Mark Courtney (Northern Ireland)

Rosenborg won 10–2 on aggregate.

1 August 2007
21:00

FH (Iceland)	1–3	(Belarus) BATE Borisov
Ólafsson 4'	Report	Likhtarovich 31'; Rodionov 50'; Bliznyuk 61'

Kaplakriki, Hafnarfjörður
Attendance: 1,587
Referee: Jacek Granat (Poland)
8 August 2007
18:00

BATE Borisov (Belarus)	1–1	(Iceland) FH
D. Platonaw 90+3'	Report	T. Guðmundsson 33' (pen.)

City Stadium, Borisov
Attendance: 5,300
Referee: Fritz Stuchlik (Austria)

BATE Borisov won 4–2 on aggregate.

31 July 2007
20:15

Copenhagen (Denmark)	1–0	(Israel) Beitar Jerusalem
Allbäck 9'	Report

Parken Stadium, Copenhagen
Attendance: 21,336
Referee: Eduardo Iturralde González (Spain)
7 August 2007
20:15

Beitar Jerusalem (Israel)	1–1 (a.e.t.)	(Denmark) Copenhagen
Yitzhaki 60'	Report	Allbäck 97'

Teddy Stadium, Jerusalem
Attendance: 16,800
Referee: Nicola Rizzoli (Italy)

Copenhagen won 2–1 on aggregate.

1 August 2007
20:00

Žilina (Slovakia)	0–0	(Czech Republic) Slavia Prague
	Report

Štadión pod Dubňom, Žilina
Attendance: 9,600
Referee: Martin Ingvarsson (Sweden)
8 August 2007
20:45

Slavia Prague (Czech Republic)	0–0 (a.e.t.)	(Slovakia) Žilina
	Report
Penalties
Volešák (penalty missed); Tavares (penalty scored); Krajčík (penalty scored); Suchý (penalty missed); Necid (penalty scored); Vlček (penalty scored)	4–3	(penalty missed) Štrba; (penalty missed) Štyvar; (penalty scored) Jež; (penalty scored) Vladavić; (penalty scored) Devátý; (penalty missed) Vomáčka

Stadion Evžena Rošického, Prague
Attendance: 11,222
Referee: Duarte Gomes (Portugal)

0–0 on aggregate; Slavia Prague won 4–3 on penalties.

31 July 2007
18:00

Tampere United (Finland)	1–0	(Bulgaria) Levski Sofia
Petrescu 15'	Report

Tampere Stadium, Tampere
Attendance: 8,126
Referee: Dougie McDonald (Scotland)
7 August 2007
19:30

Levski Sofia (Bulgaria)	0–1	(Finland) Tampere United
	Report	Niemi 40'

Vasil Levski National Stadium, Sofia
Attendance: 11,704
Referee: Thorsten Kinhöfer (Germany)

Tampere United won 2–0 on aggregate.

1 August 2007
20:30

Domžale (Slovenia)	1–2	(Croatia) Dinamo Zagreb
Žeželj 87'	Report	Šokota 7'; Modrić 50' (pen.)

Sports Park, Domžale
Attendance: 2,787
Referee: Thomas Einwaller (Austria)
7 August 2007
20:15

Dinamo Zagreb (Croatia)	3–1	(Slovenia) Domžale
Vukojević 18'; Šokota 22'; Sammir 60'	Report	Zahora 27'

Stadion Maksimir, Zagreb
Attendance: 14,550
Referee: Johan Verbist (Belgium)

Dinamo Zagreb won 5–2 on aggregate.

1 August 2007
20:00

Beşiktaş (Turkey)	1–0	(Moldova) Sheriff Tiraspol
İbrahim Toraman 73'	Report

BJK İnönü Stadium, Istanbul
Attendance: 17,871
Referee: Peter Sippel (Germany)
8 August 2007
19:00

Sheriff Tiraspol (Moldova)	0–3	(Turkey) Beşiktaş
	Report	Bobô 58', 69'; Koray 90'

Sheriff Stadium, Tiraspol
Attendance: 13,000
Referee: Iain Brines (Scotland)

Beşiktaş won 4–0 on aggregate.

== Third qualifying round ==
The draw was held on 3 August 2007 in Nyon, Switzerland. The draw was conducted by UEFA General Secretary David Taylor and Giorgio Marchetti, UEFA's director of professional football.

=== Seeding ===
Seeded		Unseeded	
(England) Liverpool (England) Arsenal (Spain) Valencia (Spain) Sevilla (Portugal) Benfica (Netherlands) Ajax (Germany) Werder Bremen (Scotland) Celtic	(Romania) Steaua București (Italy) Lazio (Scotland) Rangers (Ukraine) Shakhtar Donetsk (Turkey) Beşiktaş (Belgium) Anderlecht (Ukraine) Dynamo Kyiv (Finland) Tampere United	(Czech Republic) Sparta Prague (Turkey) Fenerbahçe (Greece) AEK Athens (Romania) Dinamo București (Czech Republic) Slavia Prague (Russia) Spartak Moscow (Norway) Rosenborg (Serbia) Red Star Belgrade	(Denmark) Copenhagen (France) Toulouse (Croatia) Dinamo Zagreb (Bosnia and Herzegovina) Sarajevo (Sweden) IF Elfsborg (Switzerland) Zürich (Austria) Red Bull Salzburg (Belarus) BATE Borisov

Notes

1. ^{†} Winners of the previous qualifying round whose identity was not known at the time of the draw. Teams in italics defeated a team with a higher coefficient in the previous qualifying round, thus effectively taking the coefficient of their defeated opponent in the draw for this round.

=== Summary ===
The first leg matches were played on 14 August and 15 August, while the second legs were played on 28 August and 29 August 2007. Winners in this round qualified for the group stage, while the losing clubs entered the first round of the UEFA Cup. Due to the death of Antonio Puerta, the second leg of Sevilla's game against AEK Athens was postponed until 3 September.

Team 1	Agg.	Team 2	1st leg	2nd leg
BATE Borisov (Belarus)	2–4	(Romania) Steaua București	2–2	0–2
Tampere United (Finland)	0–5	(Norway) Rosenborg	0–3	0–2
Spartak Moscow (Russia)	2–2 (3–4 p)	(Scotland) Celtic	1–1	1–1 (a.e.t.)
Werder Bremen (Germany)	5–3	(Croatia) Dinamo Zagreb	2–1	3–2
Red Bull Salzburg (Austria)	2–3	(Ukraine) Shakhtar Donetsk	1–0	1–3
Ajax (Netherlands)	1–3	(Czech Republic) Slavia Prague	0–1	1–2
Valencia (Spain)	5–1	(Sweden) IF Elfsborg	3–0	2–1
Sarajevo (Bosnia and Herzegovina)	0–4	(Ukraine) Dynamo Kyiv	0–1	0–3
Fenerbahçe (Turkey)	3–0	(Belgium) Anderlecht	1–0	2–0
Rangers (Scotland)	1–0	(Serbia) Red Star Belgrade	1–0	0–0
Toulouse (France)	0–5	(England) Liverpool	0–1	0–4
Benfica (Portugal)	3–1	(Denmark) Copenhagen	2–1	1–0
Lazio (Italy)	4–2	(Romania) Dinamo București	1–1	3–1
Sparta Prague (Czech Republic)	0–5	(England) Arsenal	0–2	0–3
Zürich (Switzerland)	1–3	(Turkey) Beşiktaş	1–1	0–2
Sevilla (Spain)	6–1	(Greece) AEK Athens	2–0	4–1

=== Matches ===
15 August 2007
19:00

BATE Borisov (Belarus)	2–2	(Romania) Steaua București
Radzkow 39'; Bliznyuk 90+2'	Report	Goian 60'; Dică 85'

City Stadium, Borisov
Attendance: 5,300
Referee: Matteo Trefoloni (Italy)
29 August 2007
19:30

Steaua București (Romania)	2–0	(Belarus) BATE Borisov
Zaharia 12'; Neaga 54'	Report

Stadionul Steaua, Bucharest
Attendance: 24,254
Referee: Pieter Vink (Netherlands)

Steaua București won 4–2 on aggregate.

15 August 2007
18:00

Tampere United (Finland)	0–3	(Norway) Rosenborg
	Report	Koppinen 19'; Koné 20', 81'

Tampere Stadium, Tampere
Attendance: 16,800
Referee: Pedro Proença (Portugal)
29 August 2007
21:40

Rosenborg (Norway)	2–0	(Finland) Tampere United
Sapara 45'; Ya Konan 48'	Report

Lerkendal Stadion, Trondheim
Attendance: 14,123
Referee: Alain Hamer (Luxembourg)

Rosenborg won 5–0 on aggregate.

15 August 2007
18:00

Spartak Moscow (Russia)	1–1	(Scotland) Celtic
Pavlyuchenko 42'	Report	Hartley 21'

Luzhniki Stadium, Moscow
Attendance: 5,000
Referee: Herbert Fandel (Germany)
29 August 2007
20:45

Celtic (Scotland)	1–1 (a.e.t.)	(Russia) Spartak Moscow
McDonald 27'	Report	Pavlyuchenko 45'
Penalties
Caldwell (penalty scored); Nakamura (penalty missed); Vennegoor of Hesselink (penalty scored); Riordan (penalty scored); Żurawski (penalty scored)	4–3	(penalty scored) Mozart; (penalty missed) Titov; (penalty scored) Pavlyuchenko; (penalty scored) Șoavă; (penalty missed) Kalynychenko

Celtic Park, Glasgow
Attendance: 57,644
Referee: Roberto Rosetti (Italy)

2–2 on aggregate; Celtic won 4–3 on penalties.

15 August 2007
20:30

Werder Bremen (Germany)	2–1	(Croatia) Dinamo Zagreb
Almeida 46'; Jensen 85'	Report	Balaban 45+1'

Weserstadion, Bremen
Attendance: 25,474
Referee: Alberto Undiano Mallenco (Spain)
29 August 2007
20:30

Dinamo Zagreb (Croatia)	2–3	(Germany) Werder Bremen
Vukojević 21'; Modrić 40' (pen.)	Report	Diego 15' (pen.), 70' (pen.); Sanogo 38'

Stadion Maksimir, Zagreb
Attendance: 34,175
Referee: Terje Hauge (Norway)

Werder Bremen won 5–3 on aggregate.

15 August 2007
20:30

Red Bull Salzburg (Austria)	1–0	(Ukraine) Shakhtar Donetsk
Zickler 10' (pen.)	Report

Red Bull Arena, Salzburg
Attendance: 23,690
Referee: Damir Skomina (Slovenia)
29 August 2007
18:00

Shakhtar Donetsk (Ukraine)	3–1	(Austria) Red Bull Salzburg
Lucarelli 9'; Castillo 79' (pen.); Brandão 87'	Report	Meyer 5'

RSC Olimpiyskiy, Donetsk
Attendance: 26,000
Referee: Laurent Duhamel (France)

Shakhtar Donetsk won 3–2 on aggregate.

15 August 2007
20:30

Ajax (Netherlands)	0–1	(Czech Republic) Slavia Prague
	Report	Kalivoda 75' (pen.)

Amsterdam Arena, Amsterdam
Attendance: 30,000
Referee: Florian Meyer (Germany)
29 August 2007
20:30

Slavia Prague (Czech Republic)	2–1	(Netherlands) Ajax
Vlček 23', 87'	Report	Suárez 34'

Stadion Evžena Rošického, Prague
Attendance: 17,330
Referee: Claus Bo Larsen (Denmark)

Slavia Prague won 3–1 on aggregate.

14 August 2007
22:00

Valencia (Spain)	3–0	(Sweden) IF Elfsborg
Vicente 6'; Silva 58'; Morientes 70'	Report

Mestalla Stadium, Valencia
Attendance: 46,320
Referee: Robert Małek (Poland)
29 August 2007
20:45

IF Elfsborg (Sweden)	1–2	(Spain) Valencia
Alexandersson 31'	Report	Helguera 4'; Villa 90'

Borås Arena, Borås
Attendance: 13,148
Referee: Yuri Baskakov (Russia)

Valencia won 5–1 on aggregate.

15 August 2007
20:00

Sarajevo (Bosnia and Herzegovina)	0–1	(Ukraine) Dynamo Kyiv
	Report	Shatskikh 13'

Asim Ferhatović Hase Stadium, Sarajevo
Attendance: 28,000
Referee: Alon Yefet (Israel)
29 August 2007
18:00

Dynamo Kyiv (Ukraine)	3–0	(Bosnia and Herzegovina) Sarajevo
Bangoura 3'; Milošević 75' (o.g.); Rebrov 90+2' (pen.)	Report

Valeriy Lobanovskyi Dynamo Stadium, Kyiv
Attendance: 16,100
Referee: Stuart Dougal (Scotland)

Dynamo Kyiv won 4–0 on aggregate.

15 August 2007
20:00

Fenerbahçe (Turkey)	1–0	(Belgium) Anderlecht
Alex 32'	Report

Şükrü Saracoğlu Stadium, Istanbul
Attendance: 37,919
Referee: Howard Webb (England)
29 August 2007
20:30

Anderlecht (Belgium)	0–2	(Turkey) Fenerbahçe
	Report	Kežman 4'; Alex 73'

Constant Vanden Stock Stadium, Brussels
Attendance: 20,722
Referee: Massimo Busacca (Switzerland)

Fenerbahçe won 3–0 on aggregate.

14 August 2007
21:00

Rangers (Scotland)	1–0	(Serbia) Red Star Belgrade
Novo 90'	Report

Ibrox Stadium, Glasgow
Attendance: 35,364
Referee: Martin Hansson (Sweden)
28 August 2007
20:00

Red Star Belgrade (Serbia)	0–0	(Scotland) Rangers
	Report

Red Star Stadium, Belgrade
Attendance: 40,104
Referee: Lucílio Batista (Portugal)

Rangers won 1–0 on aggregate.

15 August 2007
16:30

Toulouse (France)	0–1	(England) Liverpool
	Report	Voronin 43'

Stadium Municipal, Toulouse
Attendance: 30,380
Referee: Kyros Vassaras (Greece)
28 August 2007
21:05

Liverpool (England)	4–0	(France) Toulouse
Crouch 19'; Hyypiä 49'; Kuyt 87', 90+1'	Report

Anfield, Liverpool
Attendance: 43,118
Referee: Wolfgang Stark (Germany)

Liverpool won 5–0 on aggregate.

14 August 2007
21:15

Benfica (Portugal)	2–1	(Denmark) Copenhagen
Rui Costa 25', 85'	Report	Hutchinson 35'

Estádio da Luz, Lisbon
Attendance: 55,722
Referee: Viktor Kassai (Hungary)
29 August 2007
20:45

Copenhagen (Denmark)	0–1	(Portugal) Benfica
	Report	Katsouranis 17'

Parken Stadium, Copenhagen
Attendance: 39,711
Referee: Eric Braamhaar (Netherlands)

Benfica won 3–1 on aggregate.

14 August 2007
20:45

Lazio (Italy)	1–1	(Romania) Dinamo București
Mutarelli 54'	Report	Dănciulescu 22'

Stadio Olimpico, Rome
Attendance: 35,172
Referee: Tom Henning Øvrebø (Norway)
28 August 2007
21:00

Dinamo București (Romania)	1–3	(Italy) Lazio
Bratu 27'	Report	Rocchi 47' (pen.), 66'; Pandev 53'

Stadionul Național, Bucharest
Attendance: 40,164
Referee: Manuel Mejuto González (Spain)

Lazio won 4–2 on aggregate.

15 August 2007
20:45

Sparta Prague (Czech Republic)	0–2	(England) Arsenal
	Report	Fàbregas 72'; Hleb 90+2'

Generali Arena, Prague
Attendance: 19,856
Referee: Luis Medina Cantalejo (Spain)
29 August 2007
21:05

Arsenal (England)	3–0	(Czech Republic) Sparta Prague
Rosický 7'; Fàbregas 82'; Eduardo 89'	Report

Emirates Stadium, London
Attendance: 58,462
Referee: Frank De Bleeckere (Belgium)

Arsenal won 5–0 on aggregate.

15 August 2007
20:15

Zürich (Switzerland)	1–1	(Turkey) Beşiktaş
Alphonse 90+7'	Report	Delgado 3'

Hardturm, Zürich (Note: Zürich played their home match at Hardturm as their regular home venue Letzigrund was closed for renovation.)
Attendance: 14,000
Referee: Mike Riley (England)
29 August 2007
19:15

Beşiktaş (Turkey)	2–0	(Switzerland) Zürich
Delgado 56', 64'	Report

BJK İnönü Stadium, Istanbul
Attendance: 22,773
Referee: Peter Fröjdfeldt (Sweden)

Beşiktaş won 3–1 on aggregate.

15 August 2007
20:45

Sevilla (Spain)	2–0	(Greece) AEK Athens
Luís Fabiano 48'; Kanouté 67'	Report

Ramón Sánchez Pizjuán Stadium, Seville
Attendance: 34,852
Referee: Ľuboš Micheľ (Slovakia)
3 September 2007 (Note: The second leg of Sevilla's game against AEK Athens was postponed until 3 September due to the death of Antonio Puerta.)
20:45

AEK Athens (Greece)	1–4	(Spain) Sevilla
Rivaldo 82' (pen.)	Report	Luís Fabiano 31' (pen.), 45'; Keita 40'; Kerzhakov 53'

Olympic Stadium, Athens
Attendance: 37,777
Referee: Paul Allaerts (Belgium)

Sevilla won 6–1 on aggregate.
