= Cone (disambiguation) =

A cone is a basic geometrical shape.

Cone may also refer to:

== Mathematics ==
- Cone (category theory)
- Cone (formal languages)
- Cone (graph theory), a graph in which one vertex is adjacent to all others
- Cone (linear algebra), a subset of vector space
- Mapping cone (homological algebra)
- Cone (topology)
- Projective cone, the union of all lines that intersect a projective subspace and an arbitrary subset of some other disjoint subspace
- co-NE (complexity), the complementary complexity class of NE (complexity)

== Astronomy ==
- Cone Nebula (also known as NGC 2264), an H II region in the constellation of Monoceros
- Ionization cone, cones of material extending out from spiral galaxies

== Engineering and physical science ==
- Antenna blind cone, the volume of space that cannot be scanned by an antenna
- Cone clutch, which serves the same purpose as a disk or plate clutch
- Cone of depression occurs in an aquifer when groundwater is pumped from a well
- Cone of uncertainty, used in project management to describe the evolution of the amount of best case uncertainty during a project
- Hertzian cone, the cone of force that propagates through a brittle, amorphous or cryptocrystalline solid material from a point of impact
- Inlet cone, a component of some supersonic aircraft and missiles
- Nose cone, used to refer to the forwardmost section of a rocket, guided missile or aircraft
- Pyrometric cone, pyrometric devices that are used to gauge time and temperature during the firing of ceramic materials
- Roller cone bit, a drill bit used for drilling through rock, for example when drilling for oil and gas
- Skid cone, a hollow steel or plastic cone placed over the sawn end of a log
- Speaker cone, the cone inside a loudspeaker that moves to generate sound
- Spinning cone columns, used in a form of steam distillation to gently extract volatile chemicals from liquid foodstuffs

== Biology and medicine ==
- Cone cell, in anatomy, a type of light-sensitive cell found along with rods in the retina of the eye
- Cone snail, a carnivorous mollusc of the family Conidae
- Conifer cone, a seed-bearing organ on conifer plants
- Growth cone, a dynamic, actin-supported extension of a developing axon seeking its synaptic target
- Strobilus, a term for several categories of cone-like structures in botany
- Conical galls produced by witch-hazel cone gall aphid (Hormaphis hamamelidis), an insect
- Elizabethan collar, also known as a recovery cone or pet cone, a protective medical device for animals

== Geography ==
- Cinder cone, a steep conical hill of volcanic fragments around and downwind from a volcanic vent
- Cone (hill), a hill in the shape of a cone which may or may not be volcanic in origin
- Dirt cone, a feature of a glacier or snow patch, in which dirt forms a coating insulating the ice below
- Parasitic cone (or satellite cone), a geographical feature found around a volcano
- Shatter cone, rare geological feature in the bedrock beneath meteorite impact craters or underground nuclear explosions
- Volcanic cone, among the simplest volcanic formations in the world

== Places ==
- Cone (Phrygia), a town and bishopric of ancient Phrygia
- Cone, Michigan, an unincorporated community in Michigan
- Cone, Texas, an unincorporated community in Crosby County, Texas, US
- Cone Islet, a small granite island in south-eastern Australia

== People ==
- Cone (surname)
- Jason McCaslin (born 1980), nicknamed Cone, bassist for the Canadian band Sum 41

== Other uses ==
- Ice cream cone, an edible container in which ice cream is served, shaped like an inverted cone open at its top
- Snow cone, a dessert usually made of crushed or shaved ice, flavored with sweet, usually fruit-flavored, brightly colored syrup
- Traffic cone, a brightly colored cone-shaped plastic object commonly used as a temporary traffic barrier or warning sign
- USS Cone (DD-866), a Gearing-class destroyer of the US Navy
- "The Cone", a 1895 horror science fiction short story by English writer H. G. Wells

== See also ==
- Kone (disambiguation)
- Colne (disambiguation) (pronounced cone)
