= Youssouf Koné =

Youssouf Koné may refer to:

- Youssouf Koné (footballer, born 1983), Ivorian football midfielder
- Youssouf Koné (footballer, born 1995), Malian football defender

== See also ==
- Yssouf Koné (born 1982), Burkinabé football forward
