= 2007–08 UEFA Champions League =

European football tournament

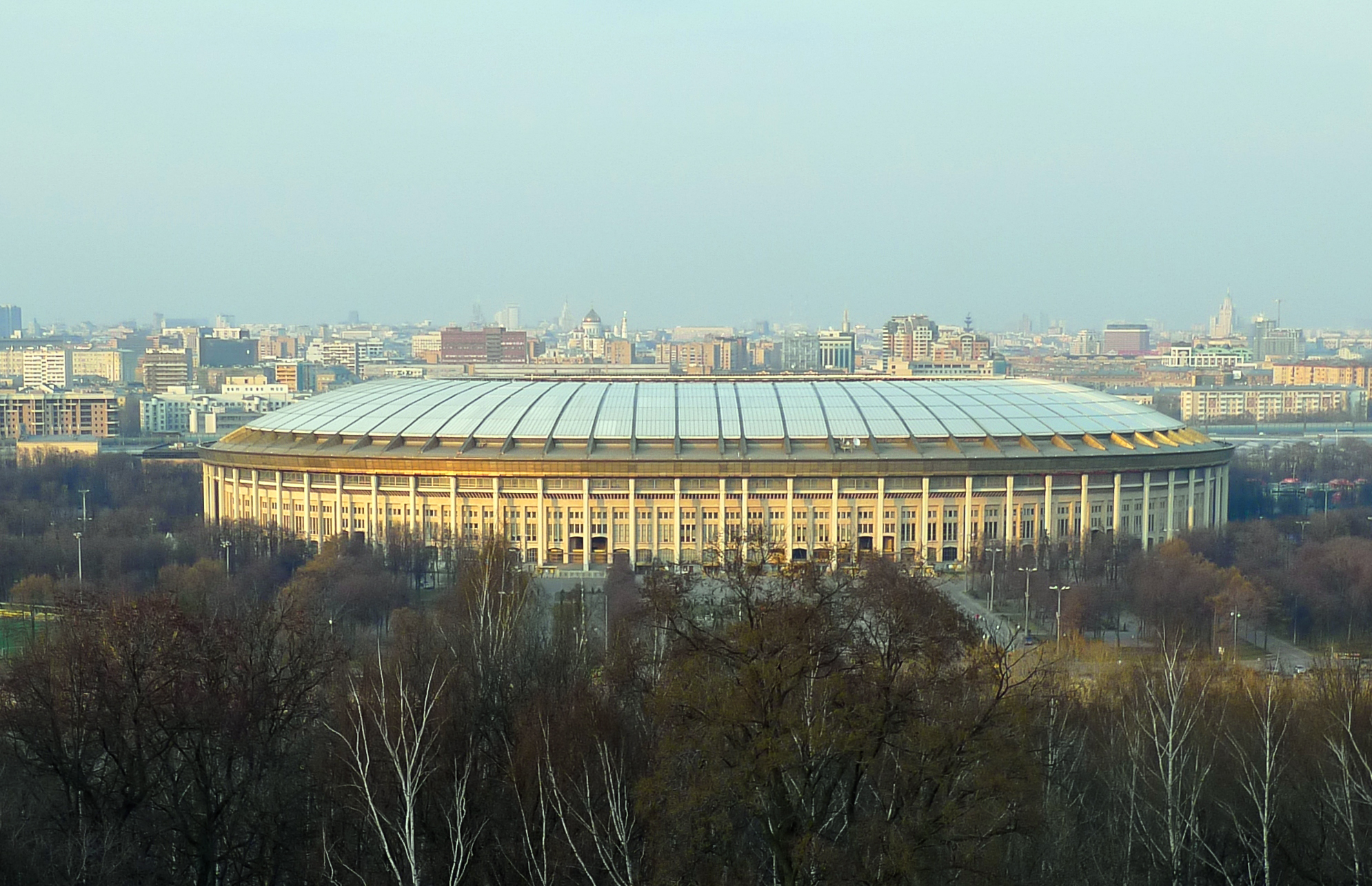
- The Luzhniki Stadium in Moscow hosted the final

Tournament details
- Dates: Qualifying: 17 July – 29 August 2007; Competition proper: 18 September 2007 – 21 May 2008
- Teams: Competition proper: 32; Total: 76

Final positions
- Champions: (England) Manchester United (3rd title)
- Runners-up: (England) Chelsea

Tournament statistics
- Matches played: 125
- Goals scored: 330 (2.64 per match)
- Attendance: 5,380,947 (43,048 per match)
- Top scorer(s): Cristiano Ronaldo (Manchester United); 8 goals

The 2007–08 UEFA Champions League was the 16th season of UEFA's premier European club football tournament, the UEFA Champions League, since it was rebranded in 1992, and the 53rd tournament overall.

The final was played on 21 May 2008 at the Luzhniki Stadium in Moscow, Russia, where Manchester United played against Chelsea, making it an all-English final for the first time in the history of the European Cup. Manchester United won the match 6–5 on penalties, following a 1–1 draw after extra time.

Milan were the defending champions, but were eliminated by Arsenal in the first knockout round.

== Association team allocation ==
76 teams participated in the 2007–08 UEFA Champions League from 52 UEFA member associations (not including Liechtenstein). Each association enters a certain number of clubs to the Champions League based on its league coefficient which takes into account the performance of its clubs in European competitions from 2001–02 to 2005–06.; associations with a higher league coefficients may enter more clubs than associations with a lower league coefficient, but no association may enter more than four teams. All UEFA associations are guaranteed to have at least one team qualify, with the exception of Liechtenstein, which competes in the Swiss league system, but has no team in the Swiss Super League. One new nation entered their league champion in this year's tournament: Montenegro, following the dissolution of Serbia and Montenegro. The champions from San Marino and Andorra also entered from this year onwards. Below is the qualification scheme for the 2007–08 Champions League:

- Associations 1–3 each have four teams qualify.
- Associations 4–6 each have three teams qualify.
- Associations 7–15 each have two teams qualify.
- Associations 16–53 (except Liechtenstein) each have one team qualify.

=== Association ranking ===
For the 2007–08 UEFA Champions League, the associations are allocated places according to their 2006 UEFA country coefficients, which takes into account their performance in European competitions from 2001–02 to 2005–06.

Rank	Association	Coeff.	Teams
1	Spain	72.748	4
2	Italy	66.731	4
3	England	63.486	4
4	France	50.781	3
5	Germany	48.364	3
6	Portugal	44.041	3
7	Netherlands	41.331	2
8	Greece	32.081	2
9	Russia	31.833	2
10	Romania	31.457	2
11	Scotland	30.375	2
12	Belgium	30.250	2
13	Ukraine	26.600	2
14	Czech Republic	26.575	2
15	Turkey	26.166	2
16	Switzerland	25.875	1
17	Bulgaria	24.290	1
18	Israel	21.541	1

Rank	Association	Coeff.	Teams
19	Norway	20.975	1
20	Austria	20.375	1
21	Serbia	19.999	1
22	Poland	18.500	1
23	Denmark	16.950	1
24	Hungary	14.665	1
25	Croatia	14.083	1
26	Sweden	13.249	1
27	Slovakia	12.332	1
28	Cyprus	10.165	1
29	Slovenia	10.165	1
30	Bosnia and Herzegovina	8.165	1
31	Finland	7.373	1
32	Latvia	7.164	1
33	Moldova	6.832	1
34	Georgia	6.331	1
35	Lithuania	5.832	1
36	Macedonia	5.331	1

Rank	Association	Coeff.	Teams
37	Iceland	4.832	1
38	Liechtenstein	4.500	0
39	Belarus	4.415	1
40	Republic of Ireland	4.331	1
41	Albania	3.665	1
42	Armenia	2.998	1
43	Estonia	2.665	1
44	Malta	2.665	1
45	Wales	2.332	1
46	Northern Ireland	2.332	1
47	Azerbaijan	1.999	1
48	Luxembourg	1.832	1
49	Kazakhstan	1.666	1
50	Faroe Islands	1.665	1
51	San Marino	0.000	1
52	Andorra	0.000	1
53	Montenegro	0.000	1

=== Distribution ===
Since the title holders (Milan) qualified for the Champions League third qualifying round through their domestic league and entered the group stage automatically, their spot in the third qualifying round is vacated, and the following changes to the default access list are made:

- The champions of association 16 (Switzerland) are promoted from the second qualifying round to the third qualifying round.
- The champions of associations 23 and 24 (Denmark and Hungary) are promoted from the first qualifying round to the second qualifying round.

	Teams entering in this round	Teams advancing from previous round
First qualifying round (28 teams)	28 champions from associations 25–53 (except Liechtenstein)	
Second qualifying round (28 teams)	8 champions from associations 17–24; 6 runners-up from associations 10–15	14 winners from the first qualifying round
Third qualifying round (32 teams)	7 champions from associations 10–16; 3 runners-up from associations 7–9; 6 third-place finishers from associations 1–6; 2 fourth-place finishers from associations 1–3 (except title holders Milan)	14 winners from the second qualifying round
Group stage (32 teams)	1 current Champions League holder; 9 champions from associations 1–9; 6 runners-up from associations 1–6	16 winners from the third qualifying round
Knockout phase (16 teams)		8 group winners from the group stage; 8 group runners-up from the group stage

=== Teams ===
Group stage
(Spain) Real Madrid (1st)	(Italy) Milan (4th)^{TH}	(France) Marseille (2nd)	(Portugal) Sporting CP (2nd)
(Spain) Barcelona (2nd)	(England) Manchester United (1st)	(Germany) VfB Stuttgart (1st)	(Netherlands) PSV Eindhoven (1st)
(Italy) Internazionale (1st)	(England) Chelsea (2nd)	(Germany) Schalke 04 (2nd)	(Greece) Olympiacos (1st)
(Italy) Roma (2nd)	(France) Lyon (1st)	(Portugal) Porto (1st)	(Russia) CSKA Moscow (1st)
Third qualifying round
(Spain) Sevilla (3rd)	(France) Toulouse (3rd)	(Russia) Spartak Moscow (2nd)	(Ukraine) Dynamo Kyiv (1st)
(Spain) Valencia (4th)	(Germany) Werder Bremen (3rd)	(Romania) Dinamo București (1st)	(Czech Republic) Sparta Prague (1st)
(Italy) Lazio (3rd)	(Portugal) Benfica (3rd)	(Scotland) Celtic (1st)	(Turkey) Fenerbahçe (1st)
(England) Liverpool (3rd)	(Netherlands) Ajax (PO)	(Belgium) Anderlecht (1st)	(Switzerland) Zürich (1st)
(England) Arsenal (4th)	(Greece) AEK Athens (2nd)		
Second qualifying round
(Romania) F.C. Steaua București (2nd)	(Czech Republic) Slavia Prague (2nd)	(Norway) Rosenborg (1st)	(Poland) Zagłębie Lubin (1st)
(Scotland) Rangers (2nd)	(Turkey) Beşiktaş (2nd)	(Austria) Red Bull Salzburg (1st)	(Denmark) Copenhagen (1st)
(Belgium) Genk (2nd)	(Bulgaria) Levski Sofia (1st)	(Serbia) Red Star Belgrade (1st)	(Hungary) Debrecen (1st)
(Ukraine) Shakhtar Donetsk (2nd)	(Israel) Beitar Jerusalem (1st)		
First qualifying round
(Croatia) Dinamo Zagreb (1st)	(Latvia) Ventspils (1st)	(Republic of Ireland) Derry City (2nd)	(Azerbaijan) Khazar Lankaran (1st)
(Sweden) IF Elfsborg (1st)	(Moldova) Sheriff Tiraspol (1st)	(Albania) Tirana (1st)	(Luxembourg) F91 Dudelange (1st)
(Slovakia) Žilina (1st)	(Georgia (country)) Olimpi Rustavi (1st)	(Armenia) Pyunik (1st)	(Kazakhstan) Astana (1st)
(Cyprus) APOEL (1st)	(Lithuania) Kaunas (1st)	(Estonia) Levadia Tallinn (1st)	(Faroe Islands) HB (1st)
(Slovenia) Domžale (1st)	(North Macedonia) Pobeda (1st)	(Malta) Marsaxlokk (1st)	(Andorra) Rànger's (1st)
(Bosnia and Herzegovina) Sarajevo (1st)	(Iceland) FH (1st)	(Wales) The New Saints (1st)	(San Marino) Murata (1st)
(Finland) Tampere United (1st)	(Belarus) BATE Borisov (1st)	(Northern Ireland) Linfield (1st)	(Montenegro) Zeta (1st)

Notes

1. Republic of Ireland (IRL): Second-placed Derry City were admitted to Champions League after last year champions Shelbourne were denied a Premier Division licence for 2007 due to financial violations.

== Round and draw dates ==
The calendar shows the dates of the rounds and draw.

Phase	Round	Draw date	First leg	Second leg
Qualifying	First qualifying round	29 June 2007	17–18 July 2007	24–25 July 2007
Qualifying	Second qualifying round	29 June 2007	31 July–1 August 2007	7–8 August 2007
Qualifying	Third qualifying round	3 August 2007	14–15 August 2007	28–29 August 2007
Group stage	Matchday 1	30 August 2007	18–19 September 2007	
Group stage	Matchday 2	30 August 2007	2–3 October 2007	
Group stage	Matchday 3	30 August 2007	23–24 October 2007	
Group stage	Matchday 4	30 August 2007	6–7 November 2007	
Group stage	Matchday 5	30 August 2007	27–28 November 2007	
Group stage	Matchday 6	30 August 2007	4 & 11–12 December 2007 (Note: Group D teams played their Matchday 6 fixtures on 4 December due to Milan's participation in the 2007 FIFA Club World Cup in Japan on 13 and 16 December.)	
Knockout phase	Round of 16	21 December 2007	19–20 February 2008	4–5 & 11 March 2008 (Note: As both Milan and Internazionale use the San Siro as their home pitch, and both teams were seeded and scheduled to host the second leg of the first knockout round at home, Internazionale's home leg against Liverpool was postponed by one week to 11 March 2008 to accommodate Milan, who were the title holders.)
Knockout phase	Quarter-finals	14 March 2008	1–2 April 2008	8–9 April 2008
Knockout phase	Semi-finals	14 March 2008	22–23 April 2008	29–30 April 2008
Knockout phase	Final	14 March 2008	21 May 2008 at Luzhniki Stadium, Moscow	

== Qualifying rounds ==
=== First qualifying round ===
The draw was held on 29 June 2007 in Nyon, Switzerland. The draw was conducted by UEFA General Secretary David Taylor and Michele Centenaro, UEFA's head of club competitions. The first leg matches were held on 17 July and 18 July, while the second legs were played on 24 July and 25 July 2007.

Team 1	Agg.	Team 2	1st leg	2nd leg
Khazar Lankaran (Azerbaijan)	2–4	(Croatia) Dinamo Zagreb	1–1	1–3 (a.e.t.)
APOEL (Cyprus)	2–3	(Belarus) BATE Borisov	2–0	0–3 (a.e.t.)
Sheriff Tiraspol (Moldova)	5–0	(Andorra) Rànger's	2–0	3–0
FH (Iceland)	4–1	(Faroe Islands) HB	4–1	0–0
The New Saints (Wales)	4–4 (a)	(Latvia) Ventspils	3–2	1–2
Pobeda (North Macedonia)	0–1	(Estonia) Levadia Tallinn	0–1	0–0
Olimpi Rustavi (Georgia (country))	0–3	(Kazakhstan) Astana	0–0	0–3
Zeta (Montenegro)	5–4	(Lithuania) Kaunas	3–1	2–3
Murata (San Marino)	1–4	(Finland) Tampere United	1–2	0–2
F91 Dudelange (Luxembourg)	5–7	(Slovakia) Žilina	1–2	4–5
Linfield (Northern Ireland)	0–1	(Sweden) IF Elfsborg	0–0	0–1
Derry City (Republic of Ireland)	0–2	(Armenia) Pyunik	0–0	0–2
Marsaxlokk (Malta)	1–9	(Bosnia and Herzegovina) Sarajevo	0–6	1–3
Domžale (Slovenia)	3–1	(Albania) Tirana	1–0	2–1

=== Second qualifying round ===
The draw was held on 29 June 2007 in Nyon, Switzerland. The draw was conducted by UEFA General Secretary David Taylor and Michele Centenaro, UEFA's head of club competitions. The first leg matches were played on 31 July and 1 August, while the second legs were played on 7 August and 8 August 2007.

Team 1	Agg.	Team 2	1st leg	2nd leg
Pyunik (Armenia)	1–4	(Ukraine) Shakhtar Donetsk	0–2	1–2
Red Star Belgrade (Serbia)	2–2 (a)	(Estonia) Levadia Tallinn	1–0	1–2
Rangers (Scotland)	3–0	(Montenegro) Zeta	2–0	1–0
Debrecen (Hungary)	0–1	(Sweden) IF Elfsborg	0–1	0–0
Zagłębie Lubin (Poland)	1–3	(Romania) Steaua București	0–1	1–2
Genk (Belgium)	2–2 (a)	(Bosnia and Herzegovina) Sarajevo	1–2	1–0
Ventspils (Latvia)	0–7	(Austria) Red Bull Salzburg	0–3	0–4
Astana (Kazakhstan)	2–10	(Norway) Rosenborg	1–3	1–7
FH (Iceland)	2–4	(Belarus) BATE Borisov	1–3	1–1
Copenhagen (Denmark)	2–1	(Israel) Beitar Jerusalem	1–0	1–1 (a.e.t.)
Žilina (Slovakia)	0–0 (3–4 p)	(Czech Republic) Slavia Prague	0–0	0–0 (a.e.t.)
Tampere United (Finland)	2–0	(Bulgaria) Levski Sofia	1–0	1–0
Domžale (Slovenia)	2–5	(Croatia) Dinamo Zagreb	1–2	1–3
Beşiktaş (Turkey)	4–0	(Moldova) Sheriff Tiraspol	1–0	3–0

=== Third qualifying round ===
The draw was held on 3 August 2007 in Nyon, Switzerland. The draw was conducted by UEFA General Secretary David Taylor and Giorgio Marchetti, UEFA's director of professional football. The first leg matches were played on 14 August and 15 August, while the second legs were played on 28 August and 29 August 2007. Winners in this round qualified for the group stage, while the losing clubs entered the first round of the UEFA Cup. Due to the death of Antonio Puerta, the second leg of Sevilla's game against AEK Athens was postponed until 3 September.

Team 1	Agg.	Team 2	1st leg	2nd leg
BATE Borisov (Belarus)	2–4	(Romania) Steaua București	2–2	0–2
Tampere United (Finland)	0–5	(Norway) Rosenborg	0–3	0–2
Spartak Moscow (Russia)	2–2 (3–4 p)	(Scotland) Celtic	1–1	1–1 (a.e.t.)
Werder Bremen (Germany)	5–3	(Croatia) Dinamo Zagreb	2–1	3–2
Red Bull Salzburg (Austria)	2–3	(Ukraine) Shakhtar Donetsk	1–0	1–3
Ajax (Netherlands)	1–3	(Czech Republic) Slavia Prague	0–1	1–2
Valencia (Spain)	5–1	(Sweden) IF Elfsborg	3–0	2–1
Sarajevo (Bosnia and Herzegovina)	0–4	(Ukraine) Dynamo Kyiv	0–1	0–3
Fenerbahçe (Turkey)	3–0	(Belgium) Anderlecht	1–0	2–0
Rangers (Scotland)	1–0	(Serbia) Red Star Belgrade	1–0	0–0
Toulouse (France)	0–5	(England) Liverpool	0–1	0–4
Benfica (Portugal)	3–1	(Denmark) Copenhagen	2–1	1–0
Lazio (Italy)	4–2	(Romania) Dinamo București	1–1	3–1
Sparta Prague (Czech Republic)	0–5	(England) Arsenal	0–2	0–3
Zürich (Switzerland)	1–3	(Turkey) Beşiktaş	1–1	0–2
Sevilla (Spain)	6–1	(Greece) AEK Athens	2–0	4–1

== Group stage ==
Location of teams of the 2007–08 UEFA Champions League group stage.
Brown: Group A; Red: Group B; Orange: Group C; Yellow: Group D;
Green: Group E; Blue: Group F; Purple: Group G; Pink: Group H.

The draw was held on Thursday, 30 August 2007 at the Grimaldi Forum in Monaco. The draw was hosted by Pedro Pinto and conducted by UEFA General Secretary David Taylor and Michele Centenaro, UEFA's head of club competitions. The matches were played between 18 September and 12 December 2007.

The top two teams in each group advanced to the knockout stage, and the third-placed teams entered the round of 32 of the UEFA Cup. Based on paragraph 6.05 in the regulations for the current season, if two or more teams are equal on points on completion of the group matches, the following criteria are applied to determine the rankings:

1. higher number of points obtained in the group matches played among the teams in question;
2. superior goal difference from the group matches played among the teams in question;
3. higher number of goals scored away from home in the group matches played among the teams in question;
4. superior goal difference from all group matches played;
5. higher number of goals scored in all group matches played;
6. higher number of coefficient points accumulated by the club in question, as well as its association, over the previous five seasons.

Sevilla and Slavia Prague made their debut appearance in the group stage.

=== Group A ===
Pos	Team	Pld	W	D	L	GF	GA	GD	Pts	Qualification	POR	LIV	MAR	BES
1	(Portugal) Porto	6	3	2	1	8	7	+1	11	Advance to knockout stage	—	1–1	2–1	2–0
2	(England) Liverpool	6	3	1	2	18	5	+13	10	Advance to knockout stage	4–1	—	0–1	8–0
3	(France) Marseille	6	2	1	3	6	9	−3	7	Transfer to UEFA Cup	1–1	0–4	—	2–0
4	(Turkey) Beşiktaş	6	2	0	4	4	15	−11	6		0–1	2–1	2–1	—

Source: RSSSF

=== Group B ===
Pos	Team	Pld	W	D	L	GF	GA	GD	Pts	Qualification	CHE	SCH	ROS	VAL
1	(England) Chelsea	6	3	3	0	9	2	+7	12	Advance to knockout stage	—	2–0	1–1	0–0
2	(Germany) Schalke 04	6	2	2	2	5	4	+1	8	Advance to knockout stage	0–0	—	3–1	0–1
3	(Norway) Rosenborg	6	2	1	3	6	10	−4	7	Transfer to UEFA Cup	0–4	0–2	—	2–0
4	(Spain) Valencia	6	1	2	3	2	6	−4	5		1–2	0–0	0–2	—

Source: RSSSF

=== Group C ===
Pos	Team	Pld	W	D	L	GF	GA	GD	Pts	Qualification	RMA	OLY	BRM	LAZ
1	(Spain) Real Madrid	6	3	2	1	13	9	+4	11	Advance to knockout stage	—	4–2	2–1	3–1
2	(Greece) Olympiacos	6	3	2	1	11	7	+4	11	Advance to knockout stage	0–0	—	3–0	1–1
3	(Germany) Werder Bremen	6	2	0	4	8	13	−5	6	Transfer to UEFA Cup	3–2	1–3	—	2–1
4	(Italy) Lazio	6	1	2	3	8	11	−3	5		2–2	1–2	2–1	—

Source: RSSSF

=== Group D ===
Pos	Team	Pld	W	D	L	GF	GA	GD	Pts	Qualification	MIL	CEL	BEN	SHK
1	(Italy) Milan	6	4	1	1	12	5	+7	13	Advance to knockout stage	—	1–0	2–1	4–1
2	(Scotland) Celtic	6	3	0	3	5	6	−1	9	Advance to knockout stage	2–1	—	1–0	2–1
3	(Portugal) Benfica	6	2	1	3	5	6	−1	7	Transfer to UEFA Cup	1–1	1–0	—	0–1
4	(Ukraine) Shakhtar Donetsk	6	2	0	4	6	11	−5	6		0–3	2–0	1–2	—

Source: RSSSF

=== Group E ===
Pos	Team	Pld	W	D	L	GF	GA	GD	Pts	Qualification	BAR	LYO	RAN	STU
1	(Spain) Barcelona	6	4	2	0	12	3	+9	14	Advance to knockout stage	—	3–0	2–0	3–1
2	(France) Lyon	6	3	1	2	11	10	+1	10	Advance to knockout stage	2–2	—	0–3	4–2
3	(Scotland) Rangers	6	2	1	3	7	9	−2	7	Transfer to UEFA Cup	0–0	0–3	—	2–1
4	(Germany) VfB Stuttgart	6	1	0	5	7	15	−8	3		0–2	0–2	3–2	—

Source: RSSSF

=== Group F ===
Pos	Team	Pld	W	D	L	GF	GA	GD	Pts	Qualification	MUN	ROM	SPO	DKV
1	(England) Manchester United	6	5	1	0	13	4	+9	16	Advance to knockout stage	—	1–0	2–1	4–0
2	(Italy) Roma	6	3	2	1	11	6	+5	11	Advance to knockout stage	1–1	—	2–1	2–0
3	(Portugal) Sporting CP	6	2	1	3	9	8	+1	7	Transfer to UEFA Cup	0–1	2–2	—	3–0
4	(Ukraine) Dynamo Kyiv	6	0	0	6	4	19	−15	0		2–4	1–4	1–2	—

Source: RSSSF

=== Group G ===
Pos	Team	Pld	W	D	L	GF	GA	GD	Pts	Qualification	INT	FEN	PSV	CSKA
1	(Italy) Internazionale	6	5	0	1	12	4	+8	15	Advance to knockout stage	—	3–0	2–0	4–2
2	(Turkey) Fenerbahçe	6	3	2	1	8	6	+2	11	Advance to knockout stage	1–0	—	2–0	3–1
3	(Netherlands) PSV Eindhoven	6	2	1	3	3	6	−3	7	Transfer to UEFA Cup	0–1	0–0	—	2–1
4	(Russia) CSKA Moscow	6	0	1	5	7	14	−7	1		1–2	2–2	0–1	—

Source: RSSSF

=== Group H ===
Pos	Team	Pld	W	D	L	GF	GA	GD	Pts	Qualification	SEV	ARS	SLP	STE
1	(Spain) Sevilla	6	5	0	1	14	7	+7	15	Advance to knockout stage	—	3–1	4–2	2–1
2	(England) Arsenal	6	4	1	1	14	4	+10	13	Advance to knockout stage	3–0	—	7–0	2–1
3	(Czech Republic) Slavia Prague	6	1	2	3	5	16	−11	5	Transfer to UEFA Cup	0–3	0–0	—	2–1
4	(Romania) Steaua București	6	0	1	5	4	10	−6	1		0–2	0–1	1–1	—

Source: RSSSF

== Knockout phase ==
In the knockout stage, teams played against each other over two legs on a home-and-away basis, except for the one-match final. The mechanism of the draws for each round was as follows:

- In the draw for the round of 16, the eight group winners were seeded, and the eight group runners-up were unseeded. The seeded teams were drawn against the unseeded teams, with the seeded teams hosting the second leg. Teams from the same group or the same association could not be drawn against each other.
- In the draws for the quarter-finals and semi-finals, there were no seedings, and teams from the same group or the same association could be drawn against each other. As the draws for the quarter-finals and semi-finals were held together before the quarter-finals were played, the identity of the quarter-final winners was not known at the time of the semi-final draw. A draw was also held to determine which semi-final winner was designated as the "home" team for the final (for administrative purposes as it was played at a neutral venue).

=== Bracket ===
Round of 16
(Germany) Schalke 04 (p)	1	0	1 (4)
(Portugal) Porto	0	1	1 (1)
(Scotland) Celtic	2	0	2
(Spain) Barcelona	3	1	4
(Italy) Roma	2	2	4
(Spain) Real Madrid	1	1	2
(France) Lyon	1	0	1
(England) Manchester United	1	1	2
(England) Arsenal	0	2	2
(Italy) Milan	0	0	0
(England) Liverpool	2	1	3
(Italy) Internazionale	0	0	0
(Turkey) Fenerbahçe (p)	3	2	5 (3)
(Spain) Sevilla	2	3	5 (2)
(Greece) Olympiacos	0	0	0
(England) Chelsea	0	3	3

Quarter-finals
(Germany) Schalke 04	0	0	0
(Spain) Barcelona	1	1	2
(Italy) Roma	0	0	0
(England) Manchester United	2	1	3
(England) Arsenal	1	2	3
(England) Liverpool	1	4	5
(Turkey) Fenerbahçe	2	0	2
(England) Chelsea	1	2	3

Semi-finals
(Spain) Barcelona	0	0	0
(England) Manchester United	0	1	1
(England) Liverpool	1	2	3
(England) Chelsea (a.e.t.)	1	3	4

Final
21 May – Moscow
(England) Manchester United (p)	1 (6)
(England) Chelsea	1 (5)

=== Round of 16 ===
The draw for the round of 16 was held on 21 December 2007 at 12:00 CET in Nyon, Switzerland. The first legs were played on 19 and 20 February, while the second legs were played on 4 and 5 March 2008. Due to a stadium clash with the match between Milan and Arsenal, the second leg of Internazionale's tie against Liverpool was held on 11 March.

Team 1	Agg.	Team 2	1st leg	2nd leg
Celtic (Scotland)	2–4	(Spain) Barcelona	2–3	0–1
Lyon (France)	1–2	(England) Manchester United	1–1	0–1
Schalke 04 (Germany)	1–1 (4–1 p)	(Portugal) Porto	1–0	0–1 (a.e.t.)
Liverpool (England)	3–0	(Italy) Internazionale	2–0	1–0
Roma (Italy)	4–2	(Spain) Real Madrid	2–1	2–1
Arsenal (England)	2–0	(Italy) Milan	0–0	2–0
Olympiacos (Greece)	0–3	(England) Chelsea	0–0	0–3
Fenerbahçe (Turkey)	5–5 (3–2 p)	(Spain) Sevilla	3–2	2–3 (a.e.t.)

=== Quarter-finals ===
The draw for the quarter-finals was held on 14 March 2008 at 13:00 CET in Nyon, Switzerland. The first legs were played on 1 and 2 April, while the second legs were played on 8 and 9 April 2008.

Team 1	Agg.	Team 2	1st leg	2nd leg
Arsenal (England)	3–5	(England) Liverpool	1–1	2–4
Roma (Italy)	0–3	(England) Manchester United	0–2	0–1
Schalke 04 (Germany)	0–2	(Spain) Barcelona	0–1	0–1
Fenerbahçe (Turkey)	2–3	(England) Chelsea	2–1	0–2

=== Semi-finals ===
The draw for the semi-finals was held on 14 March 2008 at 13:00 CET in Nyon, Switzerland, after the quarter-final draw. The first legs were played on 22 and 23 April, while the second legs were played on 29 and 30 April 2008.

Team 1	Agg.	Team 2	1st leg	2nd leg
Liverpool (England)	3–4	(England) Chelsea	1–1	2–3 (a.e.t.)
Barcelona (Spain)	0–1	(England) Manchester United	0–0	0–1

=== Final ===
The final was played on 21 May 2008 at the Luzhniki Stadium in Moscow, Russia. A draw was held on 14 March 2008, after the quarter-final and semi-final draws, to determine the "home" team for administrative purposes. The final was contested by Manchester United and Chelsea, representing the first time the final had been contested by two teams from England.

United won the match 6–5 on penalties after the game had ended in a 1–1 draw. Cristiano Ronaldo had given the eventual victors the lead after 26 minutes, only for Frank Lampard to equalise immediately before half-time. Ryan Giggs came on as a substitute late in the second half to make his 759th appearance for Manchester United, a new club record. Early in extra time, Giggs had a shot cleared off the Chelsea goal-line by John Terry, whilst Chelsea twice hit the Manchester United woodwork. A melée involving most of the 22 players ensued midway through the second half of extra time, with Didier Drogba being sent off for a slap on Nemanja Vidić right in front of the referee.

The scores level at full-time, the match went to penalties. Chelsea took the upper hand in the third round of the shoot-out as Cristiano Ronaldo's penalty was saved by Petr Čech, handing John Terry the chance to win the cup with Chelsea's fifth penalty. However, Chelsea's captain lost his footing as he went to kick the ball, and his shot hit the post. Ryan Giggs stepped up for United's seventh penalty, and scored, before Edwin van der Sar saved the following kick from Nicolas Anelka to crown Manchester United as the champions of Europe for the third time.

As winners of the competition, Manchester United went on to represent UEFA at the 2008 FIFA Club World Cup.

21 May 2008
22:45 UTC+4

Manchester United (England)	1–1 (a.e.t.)	(England) Chelsea
Ronaldo 26'	Report	Lampard 45'
Penalties
Tevez (penalty scored); Carrick (penalty scored); Ronaldo (penalty missed); Hargreaves (penalty scored); Nani (penalty scored); Anderson (penalty scored); Giggs (penalty scored)	6–5	(penalty scored) Ballack; (penalty scored) Belletti; (penalty scored) Lampard; (penalty scored) A. Cole; (penalty missed) Terry; (penalty scored) Kalou; (penalty missed) Anelka

Luzhniki Stadium, Moscow
Attendance: 67,310
Referee: Ľuboš Micheľ (Slovakia)

== Statistics ==
Statistics exclude qualifying rounds.

=== Top goalscorers ===
Rank	Player	Team	Goals	Minutes played
1	(Portugal) Cristiano Ronaldo	(England) Manchester United	8	1,062
2	(Argentina) Lionel Messi	(Spain) Barcelona	6	755
2	(Spain) Fernando Torres	(England) Liverpool	6	905
2	(Ivory Coast) Didier Drogba	(England) Chelsea	6	1,071
2	(England) Steven Gerrard	(England) Liverpool	6	1,144
6	(Netherlands) Ryan Babel	(England) Liverpool	5	619
6	(Sweden) Zlatan Ibrahimović	(Italy) Internazionale	5	625
6	(Mali) Frédéric Kanouté	(Spain) Sevilla	5	714
6	(Spain) Raúl	(Spain) Real Madrid	5	715
6	(Brazil) Deivid	(Turkey) Fenerbahçe	5	844
6	(Netherlands) Dirk Kuyt	(England) Liverpool	5	892

=== Squad of the season ===
UEFA's Technical Team selected the following 21 players for the 2007–08 UEFA Champions League Team of the Tournament.

Pos.	Player	Team
GK	(Netherlands) Edwin van der Sar	(England) Manchester United
GK	(Czech Republic) Petr Čech	(England) Chelsea
GK	(Germany) Manuel Neuer	(Germany) Schalke 04
DF	(Serbia) Nemanja Vidić	(England) Manchester United
DF	(England) John Terry	(England) Chelsea
DF	(England) Rio Ferdinand	(England) Manchester United
DF	(France) Philippe Mexès	(Italy) Roma
DF	(Spain) Carles Puyol	(Spain) Barcelona
DF	(England) Jamie Carragher	(England) Liverpool
MF	(Ghana) Michael Essien	(England) Chelsea
MF	(Brazil) Alex	(Turkey) Fenerbahçe
MF	(England) Paul Scholes	(England) Manchester United
MF	(England) Frank Lampard	(England) Chelsea
MF	(England) Steven Gerrard	(England) Liverpool
MF	(Spain) Cesc Fàbregas	(England) Arsenal
FW	(England) Wayne Rooney	(England) Manchester United
FW	(Togo) Emmanuel Adebayor	(England) Arsenal
FW	(Spain) Fernando Torres	(England) Liverpool
FW	(Ivory Coast) Didier Drogba	(England) Chelsea
FW	(Portugal) Cristiano Ronaldo	(England) Manchester United
FW	(Argentina) Lionel Messi	(Spain) Barcelona

== See also ==
- 2007–08 UEFA Cup
- 2007 UEFA Intertoto Cup
- 2008 UEFA Super Cup
- 2008 FIFA Club World Cup
- 2007–08 UEFA Women's Cup
