= Kone (disambiguation) =

Kone is a Finnish elevator engineering and service company, founded in 1910. Kone, KONE, Koné and variants may also refer to:

== Broadcasting ==
- KONE (FM), radio station in Texas
- KHIT, Nevada radio station formerly known as KONE

== People ==
- Koné (surname), list of people with the surname

== Places ==
- Kone (Phrygia), town of ancient Phrygia
- Kone (volcano), a volcano in Ethiopia
- Koné, New Caledonia
- Koné, Burkina Faso

== Other uses ==
- Niveas kone, a moth, named after the Finnish engineering company

== See also ==
- Cone (disambiguation)
- Kone- ja Siltarakennus, former Finnish engineering company, 1892–1938
