= Aboubakar Koné =

Aboubakar Koné may refer to:

- Aboubakar Koné (footballer, born 1982), Ivorian football striker
- Aboubakar Koné (footballer, born 1990), French football forward

== See also ==
- Aboubacar Kone (born 2001), Ivorian-born Belgian football defender
