= Cone (surname) =

Cone is a surname. Notable people with the surname include:

- Bonnie Ethel Cone (1907–2003), American educator and founder of the University of North Carolina at Charlotte
- Carin Cone (1940–2025), American swimmer, Olympic medalist, world record holder, and gold medal winner from the Pan American Games
- Carolyn Cone (1899–1990), American politician
- Chadrick Cone (born 1983), American football wide receiver for the Georgia Force in the Arena Football League
- Cindy Parlow Cone (born 1978), American soccer player and coach
- Cone sisters, Claribel Cone (1864–1929), and Etta Cone (1870–1949), collectors and socialites
- David Cone (born 1963), former Major League Baseball pitcher
- Edward T. Cone (1917–2004), American music theorist and composer
- Fairfax M. Cone (1903–1977), director of the American Association of Advertising Agencies
- Fred Cone (baseball) (1848–1909), pioneer professional baseball player
- Fred Cone (American football) (1926–2021), former professional American football running back
- Fred P. Cone (1871–1948), twenty-seventh governor of Florida
- James H. Cone (1938–2018), advocate of Black liberation theology
- James Cone (politician) (1825–1897), American politician
- John Cone (born 1974), American professional wrestling referee
- John J. Cone, the fourth Supreme Knight of the Knights of Columbus from 1898 to 1899
- Mac Cone (born 1952), Canadian show jumper
- Martin Cone (1882–1963), 6th president of St. Ambrose College from 1930 to 1937
- Marvin Cone (1891–1965), American painter
- Reuben Cone (1788–1851), pioneer and landowner in Atlanta, Georgia
- Robert W. Cone (1957–2016), major general in the United States Army, and Special Assistant to the Commanding General of TRADOC
- Spencer Houghton Cone (1785–1855), American Baptist minister and president of the American and Foreign Bible Society
- Tim Cone (born 1957), American basketball coach

== See also ==
- Cohn, a surname
- List of people with surname Cohen
- Koné (surname), also spelled Kone
- Kohn, a surname
