= Moussa Koné =

Moussa Koné may refer to:

- Moussa Koné (Ivorian footballer), Ivorian football midfielder
- Moussa Koné (Malian footballer), Malian football midfielder
- Moussa Koné (Senegalese footballer), Senegalese football forward
- Moussa Konè (footballer, born 2000), Ivorian football midfielder
