= Ousmane Kone =

Malian politician

Minister of Health and Public Hygiene
- In office September 2013 – July 2016
- Preceded by: Soumana Makadji
- Succeeded by: Marie Madeleine Togo

Minister of Housing and Urbanism
- Incumbent
- Assumed office July 2016

Personal details
- Born: 19 May 1952 (age 74) Bamako, Mali
- Party: Rally for Mali
- Children: 6
- Education: Lycée Askia Mohamed

Ousmane Kone (born 19 May 1952) is a Malian politician who was Minister of Health and Public Hygiene in the Council of Ministers of Mali from 2013 to 2015. He obtained a bachelor's degree at Lycée Askia Mohamed in 1972. He also studied at the École nationale d’administration (ÉNA) in Bamako, the University of Montpellier and the Mediterranean Agronomic Institute of Montpellier. From 2002 to 2013, he was the technical advisor to the Ministry of Health.
