= Moussa Konè (footballer, born 2000) =

Ivorian footballer

Personal information
- Full name: Moussa Amba Cissè Konè
- Date of birth: 19 November 2000 (age 25)
- Place of birth: Abodo, Ivory Coast
- Height: 1.75 m (5 ft 9 in)
- Position: Midfielder

Youth career
- Parma

Senior career*
| Years | Team | Apps | (Gls) |
| 2021–2022 | Parma | 0 | (0) |
| 2021 | → IFK Mariehamn (loan) | 0 | (0) |
| 2021–2022 | → Pro Sesto (loan) | 0 | (0) |
- * Club domestic league appearances and goals as of 24 April 2022

Moussa Amba Cissè Konè (born 19 November 2000) is an Ivorian footballer who plays as a midfielder.

== Career ==
As a youth player, Konè joined the youth academy of Italian Serie A side Parma.

Before the 2021 season, he was sent on loan to IFK Mariehamn in Finland. On 12 February 2021, he debuted for IFK Mariehamn during a 0–2 Finnish Cup loss to Inter (Turku).

On 26 July 2021, he was loaned to Serie C club Pro Sesto.

== Career statistics ==
As of 27 June 2021

Appearances and goals by club, season and competition
| Club | Season | League | | | Cup | | Total | |
| Club | Season | Division | Apps | Goals | Apps | Goals | Apps | Goals |
|---|---|---|---|---|---|---|---|---|
| IFK Mariehamn | 2021 | Veikkausliiga | 0 | 0 | 1 | 0 | 1 | 0 |
