= Mohamed Koné =

Mohamed Koné may refer to:

- Mohamed Koné (basketball) (born 1981), Ivorian basketball player
- Mohamed Koné (footballer, born 1984), Ivorian football striker
- Mohamed Kone (footballer, born 1993), Ivorian-Burkinabé football defensive midfielder
- Mohamed Koné (footballer, born 2002), Ivorian football goalkeeper
