= Seydou Koné =

Seydou Koné may refer to:

- Alpha Blondy (born 1953), born Seydou Koné, Ivorian reggae singer
- Seydou Koné (footballer, born 1983), Ivorian football striker
- Seydou Koné (footballer, born 1987), Ivorian football centre-back
