= Ismael Kone =

Ismael Kone may refer to:

- Ismaël Koné (born 2002), Canadian soccer player
- Ismael Koné (boxer) (born 1974), Swedish boxer
- Ismaël Koné (footballer, born 1988), French football midfielder
