= Skid cone =

In forestry, a skid cone is a hollow steel or plastic cone placed over the sawn end of a log. When skidding (dragging) logs end-wise, it presents a pointed end that deflects itself past obstacles.

Skid cones are most popularly used when skidding single logs behind ATVs or light tractors, particularly when a single operator is too occupied with driving to keep a continuous watch behind. Heavy tractors and large logs smash through obstacles. Horse loggers work from behind the horse and have a better view of the moving log. Skid cones are also useful when winching by rope, where it is more difficult to steer a log.

Skid cones prevent logs from being stopped by roots, stumps or residual trees while being harvested. It also protects standing valuable trees along the path from being damaged. Operator safety is enhanced, as the cone prevents sudden stops caused by logs getting caught in an obstacle.
