= Givi Kvaratskhelia =

Georgian footballer

Personal information
- Full name: Givi Kvaratskhelia
- Date of birth: 11 May 1979 (age 47)
- Place of birth: Tbilisi, Soviet Union
- Height: 1.86 m (6 ft 1 in)
- Position: Midfielder

Senior career*
Years	Team	Apps	(Gls)
1996–1999	Dinamo Tbilisi	28	(5)
1999–2000	Merani Tbilisi	11	(4)
2000–2001	Lokomotivi Tbilisi	32	(4)
2001	Skonto	10	(1)
2001–2002	Torpedo Kutaisi	10	(1)
2002–2003	Lokomotivi Tbilisi	25	(1)
2003–2005	Tbilisi	45	(1)
2005–2008	FBK Kaunas	82	(13)
2008–2010	MTZ-RIPO Minsk	42	(17)
2010	Olimpi Rustavi	15	(5)
2010	Dinamo Brest	4	(0)
2010–2011	Dinamo Tbilisi	20	(4)
2011	Spartaki Tskhinvali	2	(0)
2011–2012	Metalurgi Rustavi	30	(4)
2012–2014	Dinamo Tbilisi	49	(3)
2014	Chikhura Sachkhere	5	(0)
2014–2015	Sioni Bolnisi	13	(3)

International career
1996–1998	Georgia U19	7	(2)
1998–2001	Georgia U21	9	(0)
2000–2005	Georgia	7	(0)
- * Club domestic league appearances and goals as of 31 May 2015

Givi Kvaratskhelia (Georgian: გივი კვარაცხელია; born 11 May 1979) is a retired Georgian footballer.

In 2010, he moved from FC Dinamo Brest in Belarus. He has also played for Torpedo Kutaisi, Skonto Riga, FC Lokomotivi Tbilisi, FC Tbilisi, FC Olimpi Rustavi and MTZ-RIPO Minsk.
