= Ibrahima Koné =

Ibrahima Koné or Ibrahim Koné may refer to:

- Ibrahima Koné (footballer, born 1969), Ivorian footballer
- Ibrahima Koné (footballer, born 1977), Malian footballer
- Ibrahim Koné (footballer, born 1989), Guinean (formerly Ivorian) footballer
- Ibrahim Koné (footballer, born 1995), Ivorian footballer
- Ibrahima Koné (footballer, born 1999), Malian footballer

== See also ==
- Brahima Bruno Koné (born 1995), Ivorian footballer
