= Aboubakar Koné (footballer, born 1990) =

French footballer (born 1990)

Personal information
- Date of birth: 3 July 1990 (age 36)
- Place of birth: France
- Position: Forward

Senior career*
Years	Team	Apps	(Gls)
2012–2014	Maccabi Paris	46	(5)
2014	Hereford United		
2015–2017	Aurillac	43	(9)
2017	Chambly	2	(0)
2017	→ Chambly B (loan)	1	(0)
2018–2019	JA Drancy	10	(1)
2020	Chamalières	6	(5)
2020–2021	Canet	1	(0)
2021–2022	Chamalières	16	(6)
2022	Đà Nẵng	9	(0)
- * Club domestic league appearances and goals as of 10:21, 26 October 2022 (UTC)

Aboubakar Koné (born 3 July 1990) is a French professional footballer who plays as a forward.

== Career ==
In 2014, Koné signed for English side Hereford United, but left due to them going bankrupt. In 2015, he signed for Aurillac in the French fifth tier. In 2017, he signed for French third tier club Chambly. Before the second half of 2019–20, Koné signed for Chamalières in the French fourth tier. Before the 2022 season, he signed for Vietnamese team Đà Nẵng. On 27 February 2022, he debuted for Đà Nẵng during a 2–2 draw with Sài Gòn FC.
