= Soumana Makadji =

Malian politician

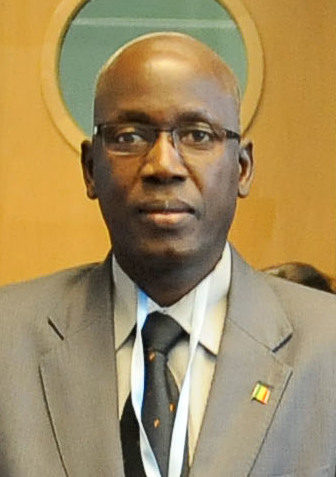
Makadji in 2013

Soumana Makadji (born 1954 in Banamba, Mali) was Minister of Health and Public Hygiene in the Council of Ministers of Mali from 17 April 2012 to September 2013, replacing Oumar Ibrahima Touré. After obtaining his baccalauréat in 1973 at the Technical High School of Bamako, he studied in University of Franche-Comté (Besançon campus) and obtained a diploma in accountancy.
