= Jari Niemi =

Finnish footballer (born 1977)

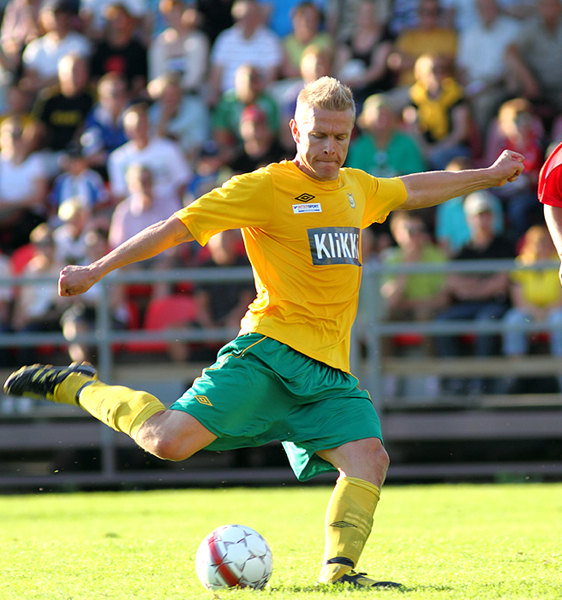
- Niemi with Ilves in 2011

Personal information
- Date of birth: 2 February 1977 (age 49)
- Place of birth: Nokia, Finland
- Height: 1.82 m (5 ft 11 1/2 in)
- Positions: Striker; midfielder

Senior career*
Years	Team	Apps	(Gls)
1994–1997	TPV	60	(14)
1998–1999	Haka	54	(6)
2000–2003	Tampere United	111	(36)
2003–2004	Mons	17	(4)
2004	Standard Liège	9	(0)
2004–2006	Sint-Truiden	43	(1)
2006–2010	Tampere United	100	(19)
2011–2012	Ilves	27	(5)

International career^{‡}
2000–2005	Finland	23	(3)
- * Club domestic league appearances and goals as of 17 December 2009 ‡ National team caps and goals as of 2 May 2013

Jari Niemi (born 2 February 1977 in Nokia) is a retired Finnish footballer. He has played for R.A.E.C. Mons, Standard Liège and K. Sint-Truidense V.V. in Belgium. In the Finnish Veikkausliiga Niemi has also played for TPV Tampere, FC Haka and Tampere United, and has won five Finnish championships. During the second qualifying round of the 2007/2008 Champions League edition, Niemi scored the only goal in Tampere's prestigious 1:0 away win against Bulgarian champions Levski Sofia. As Tampere had attained a 1:0 win in their home game, they became the first Finnish side to eliminate a Bulgarian club from the high-profile competition. However, the Finns were unable to qualify for the group stages of the Champions League, as they were eliminated by Norwegian side Rosenborg BK in the third qualifying round.

Niemi was able to play either as a right midfielder/winger or a striker.

== Career statistics ==
As of 1 September 2024.

Appearances and goals by club, season and competition
Club	Season	League			Cup (Note: Includes Suomen Cup and Belgian Cup)		League cup (Note: Includes Finnish League Cup)		Europe		Total	
Club	Season	Division	Apps	Goals	Apps	Goals	Apps	Goals	Apps	Goals	Apps	Goals
TPV	1994	Veikkausliiga	1	0	–		–		–		1	0
TPV	1995	Veikkausliiga	12	0	–		–		2 (Note: Appearances in UEFA Cup)	0	14	0
TPV	1996	Ykkönen	21	6	–		–		–		21	6
TPV	1997	Ykkönen	26	8	–		–		–		26	8
TPV	Total		60	14	0	0	0	0	2	0	62	14
Haka	1998	Veikkausliiga	26	3	–		–		4 (Note: Appearances in UEFA Cup Winners' Cup)	1	30	4
Haka	1999	Veikkausliiga	28	3	–		–		4 (Note: Appearances in UEFA Champions League)	1	32	4
Haka	Total		54	6	0	0	0	0	8	2	62	8
Tampere United	2000	Veikkausliiga	31	14	–		–		–		31	14
Tampere United	2001	Veikkausliiga	32	3	1	0	–		–		33	3
Tampere United	2002	Veikkausliiga	28	9	–		–		1	0	29	9
Tampere United	2003	Veikkausliiga	20	10	–		–		–		20	10
Tampere United	Total		111	36	1	0	0	0	1	0	113	36
Mons	2003–04	Belgian First Division	17	4	–		–		–		17	4
Standard Liège	2004–05	Belgian First Division	9	0	–		–		4	0	13	0
Sint-Truiden	2004–05	Belgian First Division	16	1	1	0	–		–		17	1
Sint-Truiden	2005–06	Belgian First Division	27	0	3	1	–		–		30	1
Sint-Truiden	Total		43	1	4	1	0	0	0	0	47	2
Tampere United	2006	Veikkausliiga	15	7	1	1	–		–		16	8
Tampere United	2007	Veikkausliiga	21	7	–		–		7 (Note: Appearances in UEFA Champions League and UEFA Cup)	4	28	11
Tampere United	2008	Veikkausliiga	19	4	1	0	–		3	2	23	6
Tampere United	2009	Veikkausliiga	24	1	4	2	8	5	–		36	8
Tampere United	2010	Veikkausliiga	22	0	0	0	1	0	–		23	0
Tampere United	Total		101	19	6	3	9	5	10	6	126	33
Ilves	2011	Kakkonen	10	3	–		–		–		10	3
Ilves	2012	Kakkonen	20	2	–		–		–		20	2
Ilves	Total		30	5	0	0	0	0	0	0	30	5
Career total			425	85	11	4	9	5	25	8	470	102

=== International ===
As of match played 9 February 2005

Finland
Year	Apps	Goals
2000	3	0
2001	8	1
2002	4	1
2003	4	1
2004	2	0
2005	2	0
Total	23	3

=== International goals ===
As of match played 29 January 2003. Finland score listed first, score column indicates score after each Niemi goal.

List of international goals scored by Jari Niemi
No.	Date	Venue	Opponent	Score	Result	Competition
1	20 February 2001	Sultan Qaboos Sports Complex, Muscat, Oman	Oman	2–0	2–0	Friendly
1	10 January 2002	Bahrain National Stadium, Riffa, Bahrain	North Macedonia	2–0	3–0	Friendly
1	29 January 2003	Hasely Crawford Stadium, Port of Spain, Trinidad and Tobago	Trinidad and Tobago	2–1	2–1	Friendly

== Honours ==
TPV

- Veikkausliiga: 1994

Haka

- Veikkausliiga: 1998, 1999

Tampere United

- Veikkausliiga: 2001, 2006, 2007
- Finnish Cup: 2007
