= Oumar Koné =

Oumar Koné or Oumar Konemay refer to:

- Oumar Basakoulba Kone, paralympic athlete, competed 1996–2008
- Oumar Koné (judoka) (born 1985), Malian judoka
- Oumar Koné (footballer) (born 1991), Malian footballer

== See also ==
- Oumou Kone (born 1999), female Malian footballer
