= Pavel Devátý =

Czech footballer

Personal information
- Full name: Pavel Devátý
- Date of birth: 17 June 1978 (age 48)
- Place of birth: Cheb, Czechoslovakia
- Height: 1.81 m (5 ft 11 1/2 in)
- Position: Midfielder

Team information
- Current team: Slavia Opava

Senior career*
Years	Team	Apps	(Gls)
2001–2006	Chmel Blšany	124	(14)
2006–2008	Žilina	62	(10)
2008–2009	Spartak Trnava	30	(5)
2010–2011	Bohemian Prague		
2011	Lokomotive Leipzig		
2011–	Pyhra		
- * Club domestic league appearances and goals as of 13 December 2009

Pavel Devátý (born 17 June 1978 in Cheb) is a Czech footballer who plays for Pyhra.

He previously played for Chmel Blšany in the Czech Gambrinus liga.
