= Youssouf Koné (footballer, born 1983) =

Ivorian footballer

Personal information
- Full name: Youssouf Koné
- Date of birth: May 28, 1983 (age 43)
- Place of birth: Abidjan, Côte d'Ivoire
- Height: 1.84 m (6 ft 0 in)
- Position: Midfielder

Team information
- Current team: Pro Sesto

Youth career
- Internazionale

Senior career*
Years	Team	Apps	(Gls)
2002–2003	Viterbese (loan)	21	(0)
2003	Legnano (loan)	15	(0)
2004	Castel di Sangro (loan)	12	(0)
2004–2005	Vittoria (co-ownership)	28	(0)
2005	Gela (co-ownership)	17	(0)
2006–2007	Lucchese	27	(0)
2007–	Pro Sesto	0	(0)
- * Club domestic league appearances and goals

Youssouf Koné (born 28 May 1983 in Abidjan) is a Côte d'Ivoire football player. He currently plays for Latina Calcio.

== Football career ==
Koné started his career at Internazionale. He won the youth champion in summer 2002. Like other member of the winning team, Koné was loaned to Viterbese of Serie C1.

In summer 2003, he joined Legnano of Serie C2, and moved to Castel di Sangro (Serie C2) in winter transfer window.

In summer 2004, Koné transferred to Vittoria of Serie C1 in join-ownership bid, along with Federico Piovaccari. But a year later he moved to Gela in a same deal.

In January 2005, Lucchese got the player license from Gela, re-joining former teammate Mathieu Moreau, and got full ownership in summer 2006, by bought remain half from Inter.

In summer 2010, Koné transferred to Latina Calcio of Serie C2.
