= Yssouf Koné =

Footballer (born 1982)

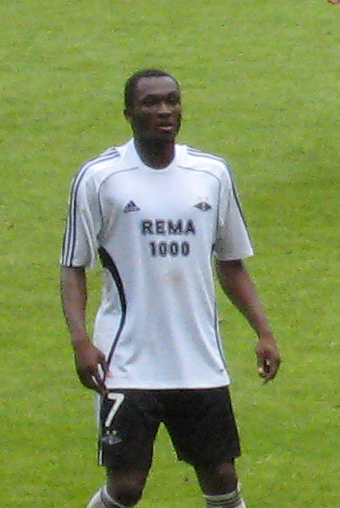
- Koné in 2008

Personal information
- Date of birth: 19 February 1982 (age 44)
- Place of birth: Korhogo, Ivory Coast
- Height: 1.88 m (6 ft 2 in)
- Position: Forward

Senior career*
Years	Team	Apps	(Gls)
2002–2005	Raja Casablanca		
2004	→ Qingdao Hailifeng (loan)	16	(1)
2005–2006	Olympic Safi		
2006–2008	Rosenborg	44	(16)
2008–2010	CFR Cluj	51	(16)
2011–2013	Vålerenga	11	(1)
Total		122	(34)

International career
2004–2010	Burkina Faso	13	(4)
- * Club domestic league appearances and goals

Yssouf Koné (born 19 February 1982) is a former professional footballer who played as a forward. Born in Ivory Coast, he represented Burkina Faso at international level.

== Club career ==
=== Early career ===
Koné was born on 19 February 1982 in Korhogo, Ivory Coast and began playing senior-level football in 2002 at Moroccan side, Raja Casablanca, winning the 2003–04 Botola title. In 2004 he had a spell at Qingdao Hailifeng, making 16 appearances and scoring once in the Chinese Super League. Afterwards he came back to Raja, winning the 2004–05 Moroccan Throne Cup. In 2005 he went to play for Olympic Safi, also in Morocco.

=== Rosenborg ===
In 2006, Koné signed with Rosenborg, making his debut in European competitions by playing in both legs of the 4–1 aggregate loss to Zenit Saint Petersburg in the round of 32 of the 2005–06 UEFA Cup. He made his Tippeligaen debut on 9 April 2006 when coach Per-Mathias Høgmo sent him to replace Thorstein Helstad in the 68th minute of a 3–3 away draw against Lillestrøm. Koné scored his first goal on 23 July in a 2–1 away loss to IK Start. He netted a total of three goals in 16 matches until the end of the season, as the team won the championship.

Koné started to play more often in the following season as Daniel Braaten was sold to Bolton Wanderers. He helped The Troll Children eliminate Zhenis and Tampere United in the 2007–08 Champions League qualifying rounds, netting four goals against the first and two against the latter. Thus the club reached the group stage where he played in all six games, starting with a 1–1 home draw against Chelsea, and scored two goals in a win over Valencia and a loss to Schalke 04. As they finished third in the group, the team qualified to the UEFA Cup round of 32, where they were defeated 3–1 on aggregate by Fiorentina, Koné netting his side's goal. Subsequently, he helped Rosenborg win the 2008 Intertoto Cup, eliminating Ekranas, against whom he scored three goals, and NAC Breda.

=== CFR Cluj ===
Koné was transferred from Rosenborg to CFR Cluj for €600,000 in the summer of 2008. He made his Liga I debut on 24 August 2008 under coach Ioan Andone in a 2–1 away loss to FC Vaslui. He netted his first goals in the competition on 21 September, managing a brace in 3–0 home victory against Farul Constanța. Until the end of the season, he scored a personal record of 10 league goals, including four in 1–0 wins over Dinamo București, Unirea Urziceni, Gloria Buzău and Politehnica Iași. Koné made six appearances in the 2008–09 Champions League group stage with The Railway Men. In the first match, they earned a historical 2–1 victory at Stadio Olimpico against AS Roma, and in the last two, Koné scored once in losses to each of Roma and Chelsea. He finished the season by helping the team win the Cupa României, coach Toni Conceição using him the entire match in the 3–0 win over Politehnica Timișoara in the final.

Koné started the following season by winning the 2009 Supercupa României, as coach Conceição sent him in the 81st minute to replace Diego Ruiz in the penalty shoot-out victory against Unirea Urziceni. His goal with a lob after a pass from Sebastián Dubarbier in a 2–1 win against FK Sarajevo in the 2009–10 Europa League play-off secured the qualification to the group stage, where he made three appearances. He scored his first league goal in a 2–2 draw against Steaua București, afterwards netting a brace in a 2–0 win over Ceahlăul Piatra Neamț. Koné contributed with a total of six goals in the 21 games under coaches Conceição and Andrea Mandorlini, as the team won the championship. He also won another Cupa României with CFR, scoring a goal which helped them get past Dinamo in the semi-finals, and then coach Mandorlini used him as a starter in the eventual penalty shoot-out win against FC Vaslui in the final.

=== Vålerenga ===
In January 2011, Koné signed for the Norwegian team Vålerenga. He helped the club get past Mika in the 2011–12 Europa League second qualifying round, being eliminated by PAOK in the following round. He netted his first goal for them on 2 July 2011 in a 2–2 draw against Strømsgodset. On 29 January 2013, his contract with Vålerenga was terminated by mutual consent.

== International career ==
Koné was born in Ivory Coast, but represented Burkina Faso internationally, playing 13 games and scoring four goals for them. He made his debut on 30 May 2004 under coach Ivica Todorov in a 3–2 friendly victory against Libya where he opened the score. His following appearance was in a 3–2 loss to DR Congo in the 2006 World Cup qualifiers, and his third game was a 1–0 win over Senegal during the 2008 Africa Cup of Nations qualifiers. He played six games in the 2010 World Cup qualifiers, netting a double in a 2–1 away victory against Tunisia and one goal in a win over Seychelles. Coach Paulo Duarte selected Koné to be part of the 2010 Africa Cup of Nations squad, using him in a goalless draw against Ivory Coast and a loss to Ghana, as The Stallions failed to progress from their group.

== Career statistics ==
=== Club ===
Appearances and goals by club, season and competition
Club	Season	Division	League		Cup		Continental		Super Cup		Total	
Club	Season	Division	Apps	Goals	Apps	Goals	Apps	Goals	Apps	Goals	Apps	Goals
Qingdao Hailifeng	Chinese Super League	2004	16	1	–		–		–		16	1
Rosenborg	Tippeligaen	2005	–		–		2 (Note: Appearances in the UEFA Cup)	0	–		2	0
Rosenborg	Tippeligaen	2006	16	3	3	0	–		–		18	3
Rosenborg	Tippeligaen	2007	19	9	1	2	12 (Note: 10 appearances with eight goals scored in the UEFA Champions League and two appearances with one goal in the UEFA Cup)	9	–		32	20
Rosenborg	Tippeligaen	2008	9	4	1	0	3 (Note: Appearance in the UEFA Intertoto Cup)	3	–		13	7
Rosenborg	Total		44	16	5	2	17	12	–		66	30
CFR Cluj	Liga I	2008–09	28	10	3	0	6 (Note: Appearances in the UEFA Champions League)	2	–		37	12
CFR Cluj	Liga I	2009–10	21	6	2	1	5 (Note: Appearances in the UEFA Europa League)	1	1	0	29	8
CFR Cluj	Liga I	2010–11	2	0	0	0	0	0	0	0	3	0
CFR Cluj	Total		51	16	5	1	11	3	1	0	68	20
Vålerenga	Tippeligaen	2011	11	1	2	1	4	0	–		17	2
Vålerenga	Tippeligaen	2012	0	0	0	0	0	0	–		0	0
Career total			122	34	12	4	32	15	1	0	167	53

=== International ===
Scores and results list Burkina Faso's goal tally first, score column indicates score after each Koné goal.

List of international goals scored by Yssouf Koné
No.	Date	Venue	Opponent	Score	Result	Competition	Ref.
1	30 May 2004	Stade du 4 Août, Ouagadougou, Burkina Faso	Libya	1–0	3–2	Friendly	
2	1 June 2008	Hammadi Agrebi Stadium, Tunis, Tunisia	Tunisia	1–1	2–1	2010 FIFA World Cup qualification	
3	1 June 2008	Hammadi Agrebi Stadium, Tunis, Tunisia	Tunisia	2–1	2–1	2010 FIFA World Cup qualification	
4	21 June 2008	Stade du 4 Août, Ouagadougou, Burkina Faso	Seychelles	4–1	4–1	2010 FIFA World Cup qualification	

== Honours ==
Raja Casablanca

- Botola: 2003–04
- Moroccan Throne Cup: 2004–05

Rosenborg

- Tippeligaen: 2006
- Intertoto Cup: 2008

CFR Cluj

- Liga I: 2009–10
- Cupa României: 2008–09, 2009–10
- Supercupa României: 2009
