= Aboubacar Kone =

Belgian footballer

Personal information
- Full name: Aboubacar Tigre Kone
- Date of birth: 28 March 2001 (age 25)
- Place of birth: Gagnoa, Ivory Coast
- Height: 1.77 m (5 ft 10 in)
- Position: Defender

Youth career
- Tubantia Borgerhout
- –2012: Beerschot
- 2012–2017: PSV Eindhoven

Senior career*
| Years | Team | Apps | (Gls) |
| 2019–2021 | Fujairah | 3 | (0) |
| 2021 | Al Urooba | | |

International career^{‡}
| 2015–2016 | Belgium U15 | 5 | (0) |
| 2016 | Belgium U16 | 1 | (0) |
- * Club domestic league appearances and goals as of 22:15, 1 February 2020 (UTC) ‡ National team caps and goals as of 22:15, 1 February 2020 (UTC)

Aboubacar Tigre Kone (born 28 March 2001) is an Ivorian-born Belgian footballer who plays as a defender.

== Career statistics ==
=== Club ===
As of 1 February 2020.

| Club | Season | League | | | Cup | | Continental | | Other | | Total | |
| Club | Season | Division | Apps | Goals | Apps | Goals | Apps | Goals | Apps | Goals | Apps | Goals |
|---|---|---|---|---|---|---|---|---|---|---|---|---|
| Fujairah | 2019–20 | UAE Pro League | 3 | 0 | 2 (Note: Appearances in the UAE League Cup) | 0 | 0 | 0 | 0 | 0 | 5 | 0 |
| Career total | | | 3 | 0 | 2 | 0 | 0 | 0 | 0 | 0 | 5 | 0 |
