= David Taylor (football administrator) =

Scottish football administrator (1954–2014)

Scottish FA Chief Executive
- Preceded by: Jim Farry
- Succeeded by: Gordon Smith

UEFA General Secretary
- In office 1 June 2007 – October 2009
- Preceded by: Gianni Infantino
- Succeeded by: Gianni Infantino

Personal details
- Born: 14 March 1954 Forfar, Scotland
- Died: 24 June 2014 (aged 60) Scotland

David Taylor (14 March 1954 – 24 June 2014) was General Secretary of UEFA and Chief Executive of the Scottish Football Association.

Born in Forfar, Scotland in 1954, he was educated at the High School of Dundee before graduating from the University of Edinburgh with a degree in law. He qualified as a solicitor and practised law until 1985, during which time he added to his legal qualifications with an MSc in Economics and an MBA.

Taylor was appointed as General Secretary of UEFA on 1 June 2007, after the UEFA extraordinary congress in Zürich on 29 May 2007 voted to replace the role of Chief Executive with that of General Secretary. He held this position until October 2009, when he moved to a marketing position within UEFA. He was previously the Chief Executive of the Scottish Football Association (SFA).

He died at the age of 60 on 24 June 2014.

Preceded by Gianni Infantino	UEFA General Secretary; 2007–2009	Succeeded by Gianni Infantino
