= Conium (Phrygia) =

Ancient town

Coordinates: 38°56′51″N 30°03′32″E

Conium, also called Conni, Conna, Konna, Kone, Cone, Demetrioupolis and Demetriopolis, was a town of ancient Phrygia Magna. According to the Peutinger Table, where the town name appears as Conni, it was located between Eucarpia and Nacolea, 32 Roman Miles from Eucarpia and 40 from Nacolea. Pliny the Elder calls the town Conium; Ptolemy calls it Conna or Konna. Under the Byzantine empire the town was called Cone or Kone (Ancient Greek: Κόνη), and was a bishopric of Phrygia Salutaris, of which Synnada was the metropolis. No longer the seat of a residential bishopric, it remains, under the name Cone, a titular see of the Roman Catholic Church.

Its site is located near Zafertepeçalköy in Asiatic Turkey.
