= 2007–08 UEFA Cup first round =

The first round of the 2007–08 UEFA Cup began on 20 September 2007, which narrowed clubs down to 40 teams in preparation for the group stage.

Times are CEST (UTC+2), as listed by UEFA.

== Teams ==
The following 80 teams participated in the first round.

Key to colours
Winners of first round advanced to group stage

First round participants

Team	Notes	Coeff.
(Spain) Villarreal		78.374
(Germany) Bayern Munich		73.640
(Netherlands) Ajax		65.995
(Netherlands) AZ		63.995
(Greece) Panathinaikos		55.415
(Switzerland) Basel		54.869
(France) Lens		51.706
(France) Bordeaux		49.706
(Germany) Bayer Leverkusen		45.640
(Belgium) Club Brugge		45.594
(Italy) Palermo		42.808
(Belgium) Anderlecht		41.594
(England) Tottenham Hotspur		40.618
(Spain) Zaragoza		40.374
(Romania) Rapid București		40.255
(Russia) Lokomotiv Moscow		38.920
(Russia) Zenit Saint Petersburg		38.920
(Czech Republic) Sparta Prague		37.851
(France) Sochaux		36.706
(England) Blackburn Rovers		36.618

Team	Notes	Coeff.
(Greece) AEK Athens		36.415
(Netherlands) Heerenveen		35.995
(Germany) Hamburger SV		34.640
(Romania) Dinamo București		34.255
(England) Bolton Wanderers		32.618
Austria Wien		30.104
(Ukraine) Dnipro Dnipropetrovsk		29.726
(Italy) Sampdoria		28.808
(Russia) Spartak Moscow		27.920
(Portugal) Braga		27.107
(Turkey) Galatasaray		26.791
(Spain) Getafe		25.374
(Spain) Atlético Madrid		25.374
(England) Everton		24.618
(Italy) Fiorentina		21.808
(Italy) Empoli		21.808
(France) Rennes		20.706
(Bulgaria) CSKA Sofia		20.112
(Israel) Hapoel Tel Aviv		19.338
(Serbia) Crvena zvezda		19.256

Team	Notes	Coeff.
(Denmark) Copenhagen		19.129
(Bulgaria) Litex Lovech		19.112
(France) Toulouse		17.706
(Croatia) Dinamo Zagreb		17.533
(Greece) Panionios		16.415
(Portugal) União de Leiria		16.107
(Denmark) Odense		15.129
(Netherlands) Groningen		14.995
(Germany) 1. FC Nürnberg		14.640
(Belgium) Standard Liège		14.594
(Portugal) Belenenses		14.107
(Portugal) Paços de Ferreira		14.107
(Czech Republic) Mladá Boleslav		13.851
(Slovakia) Artmedia Petržalka		13.575
(Greece) Aris		13.415
(Netherlands) Twente		12.995
(Poland) Groclin Grodzisk Wielkopolski		11.609
(Norway) Vålerenga		11.509
(Scotland) Aberdeen		11.064
(Bulgaria) Lokomotiv Sofia		10.112

Team	Notes	Coeff.
(Austria) Rapid Wien		10.104
(Switzerland) Zürich		9.869
(Ukraine) Metalist Kharkiv		9.726
(Denmark) Midtjylland		9.129
(Austria) Red Bull Salzburg		9.104
(Switzerland) Sion		8.869
(Turkey) Kayseri Erciyesspor		8.791
(Greece) AEL		8.415
(Denmark) AaB		7.129
(Norway) Brann		6.509
(Cyprus) Anorthosis Famagusta		5.492
(Sweden) IF Elfsborg		4.478
(Sweden) AIK		4.478
(Bosnia and Herzegovina) Sarajevo		4.190
(Sweden) Helsingborgs IF		3.478
(Sweden) Hammarby IF		3.478
(Sweden) BK Häcken		3.478
(Finland) Tampere United		2.420
(North Macedonia) Rabotnicki		1.925
(Belarus) BATE Borisov		1.540

Notes

1. ^{QR} Winners from the second qualifying round
2. ^{CL} Losers from the Champions League third qualifying round

== Seeding ==
UEFA allocated the teams into eight groups, each with five seeded and five unseeded teams.

Group 1		Group 2		Group 3		Group 4	
Seeded	Unseeded	Seeded	Unseeded	Seeded	Unseeded	Seeded	Unseeded
(Greece) AEK Athens; (Romania) Rapid București; (Russia) Lokomotiv Moscow; (England) Bolton Wanderers; (Italy) Fiorentina	(Netherlands) Groningen; (Germany) 1. FC Nürnberg; (Denmark) Midtjylland; (Austria) Red Bull Salzburg; (North Macedonia) Rabotnicki	(Spain) Villarreal; (Germany) Bayer Leverkusen; (Russia) Zenit Saint Petersburg; (Turkey) Galatasaray; (England) Everton	(Portugal) União de Leiria; (Belgium) Standard Liège; (Ukraine) Metalist Kharkiv; (Switzerland) Sion; (Belarus) BATE Borisov	(Greece) Panathinaikos; (France) Bordeaux; (Czech Republic) Sparta Prague; (Spain) Atlético Madrid; (Italy) Empoli	(Denmark) Odense; (Slovakia) Artmedia Petržalka; (Switzerland) Zürich; (Turkey) Kayseri Erciyesspor; (Finland) Tampere United	(Netherlands) AZ; (Belgium) Anderlecht; (France) Sochaux; (Italy) Sampdoria; (Russia) Spartak Moscow	(Greece) Panionios; (Portugal) Paços de Ferreira; (Austria) Rapid Wien; (Denmark) AaB; (Sweden) BK Häcken
Group 5		Group 6		Group 7		Group 8	
Seeded	Unseeded	Seeded	Unseeded	Seeded	Unseeded	Seeded	Unseeded
(Netherlands) Ajax; (Italy) Palermo; (England) Blackburn Rovers; (Portugal) Braga; (France) Rennes	(Croatia) Dinamo Zagreb; (Czech Republic) Mladá Boleslav; (Bulgaria) Lokomotiv Sofia; (Greece) AEL; (Sweden) Hammarby IF	(Germany) Bayern Munich; (Belgium) Club Brugge; (Netherlands) Heerenveen; (Ukraine) Dnipro Dnipropetrovsk; (Bulgaria) CSKA Sofia	(France) Toulouse; (Portugal) Belenenses; (Scotland) Aberdeen; (Norway) Brann; (Sweden) Helsingborgs IF	(Switzerland) Basel; (Spain) Zaragoza; (Germany) Hamburger SV; Austria Wien; (Israel) Hapoel Tel Aviv	(Bulgaria) Litex Lovech; (Greece) Aris; (Norway) Vålerenga; (Sweden) AIK; (Bosnia and Herzegovina) Sarajevo	(France) Lens; (England) Tottenham Hotspur; (Romania) Dinamo București; (Spain) Getafe; (Serbia) Crvena zvezda	(Denmark) Copenhagen; (Netherlands) Twente; (Poland) Groclin Grodzisk Wielkopolski; (Cyprus) Anorthosis Famagusta; (Sweden) IF Elfsborg

Notes

1. ^{†} Due to the death of Antonio Puerta, the second leg of AEK Athens's Champions League third qualifying round tie against Sevilla was postponed until 3 September, while the draw was held on 31 August. Due to the seeding criteria, both clubs were included in the draw interchangeably and their seeding was determined by the higher of the two teams' coefficients (Sevilla: 87.374, AEK Athens: 36.415). Eventually, AEK Athens were transferred to the UEFA Cup after losing the tie, thus effectively taking the coefficient of Sevilla in the draw.

== Summary ==
The draw, which was conducted by UEFA General Secretary David Taylor and Gérard Houllier, the winning coach in the 2000–01 tournament, was held on Friday, 31 August 2007 at 13:00 CET in Monaco. The matches were played on 20 September and 4 October 2007.

Team 1	Agg.	Team 2	1st leg	2nd leg
Midtjylland (Denmark)	1–5	(Russia) Lokomotiv Moscow	1–3	0–2
Groningen (Netherlands)	2–2 (3–4 p)	(Italy) Fiorentina	1–1	1–1 (a.e.t.)
Rabotnicki (North Macedonia)	1–2	(England) Bolton Wanderers	1–1	0–1
AEK Athens (Greece)	3–1	(Austria) Red Bull Salzburg	3–0	0–1
1. FC Nürnberg (Germany)	2–2 (a)	(Romania) Rapid București	0–0	2–2
Everton (England)	4–3	(Ukraine) Metalist Kharkiv	1–1	3–2
Zenit Saint Petersburg (Russia)	4–1	(Belgium) Standard Liège	3–0	1–1
Bayer Leverkusen (Germany)	5–4	(Portugal) União de Leiria	3–1	2–3
Villarreal (Spain)	6–1	(Belarus) BATE Borisov	4–1	2–0
Sion (Switzerland)	4–7	(Turkey) Galatasaray	3–2	1–5
Atlético Madrid (Spain)	9–0	(Turkey) Kayseri Erciyesspor	4–0	5–0
Tampere United (Finland)	3–4	(France) Bordeaux	2–3	1–1
Artmedia Petržalka (Slovakia)	1–5	(Greece) Panathinaikos	1–2	0–3
Sparta Prague (Czech Republic)	0–0 (4–3 p)	(Denmark) Odense	0–0	0–0 (a.e.t.)
Empoli (Italy)	2–4	(Switzerland) Zürich	2–1	0–3
Sochaux (France)	1–2	(Greece) Panionios	0–2	1–0
Anderlecht (Belgium)	2–1	(Austria) Rapid Wien	1–1	1–0
Paços de Ferreira (Portugal)	0–1	(Netherlands) AZ	0–1	0–0
Sampdoria (Italy)	2–2 (a)	(Denmark) AaB	2–2	0–0
Spartak Moscow (Russia)	8–1	(Sweden) BK Häcken	5–0	3–1
Hammarby IF (Sweden)	2–5	(Portugal) Braga	2–1	0–4
AEL (Greece)	3–2	(England) Blackburn Rovers	2–0	1–2
Mladá Boleslav (Czech Republic)	1–1 (4–2 p)	(Italy) Palermo	0–1	1–0 (a.e.t.)
Dinamo Zagreb (Croatia)	3–3 (a)	(Netherlands) Ajax	0–1	3–2 (a.e.t.)
Lokomotiv Sofia (Bulgaria)	3–4	(France) Rennes	1–3	2–1
Brann (Norway)	2–2 (a)	(Belgium) Club Brugge	0–1	2–1
Bayern Munich (Germany)	3–0	(Portugal) Belenenses	1–0	2–0
Aberdeen (Scotland)	1–1 (a)	(Ukraine) Dnipro Dnipropetrovsk	0–0	1–1
Heerenveen (Netherlands)	6–8	(Sweden) Helsingborgs IF	5–3	1–5
Toulouse (France)	1–1 (a)	(Bulgaria) CSKA Sofia	0–0	1–1
Litex Lovech (Bulgaria)	1–4	(Germany) Hamburger SV	0–1	1–3
Sarajevo (Bosnia and Herzegovina)	1–8	(Switzerland) Basel	1–2	0–6
Austria Wien	4–2	(Norway) Vålerenga	2–0	2–2
Hapoel Tel Aviv (Israel)	1–0	(Sweden) AIK	0–0	1–0
Aris (Greece)	2–2 (a)	(Spain) Zaragoza	1–0	1–2
Dinamo București (Romania)	2–2 (a)	(Sweden) IF Elfsborg	1–2	1–0
Tottenham Hotspur (England)	7–2	(Cyprus) Anorthosis Famagusta	6–1	1–1
Lens (France)	2–3	(Denmark) Copenhagen	1–1	1–2 (a.e.t.)
Getafe (Spain)	3–3 (a)	(Netherlands) Twente	1–0	2–3 (a.e.t.)
Groclin Grodzisk Wielkopolski (Poland)	0–2	(Serbia) Crvena zvezda	0–1	0–1

== Matches ==
20 September 2007

Midtjylland (Denmark)	1–3	(Russia) Lokomotiv Moscow
Collins 30'	Report	Samedov 61'; Bilyaletdinov 69'; Sychev 90+1'

MCH Arena, Herning
Referee: Tomasz Mikulski (Poland)
4 October 2007

Lokomotiv Moscow (Russia)	2–0	(Denmark) Midtjylland
Bilyaletdinov 11'; Maminov 15'	Report

Lokomotiv Stadium, Moscow
Referee: Georgios Kasnaferis (Greece)

Lokomotiv Moscow won 5–1 on aggregate.

20 September 2007

Groningen (Netherlands)	1–1	(Italy) Fiorentina
Lovre 25'	Report	Semioli 65'

Euroborg, Groningen
Referee: Lucílio Batista (Portugal)
4 October 2007

Fiorentina (Italy)	1–1 (a.e.t.)	(Netherlands) Groningen
Mutu 59'	Report	Nevland 55'
Penalties
Pazzini (penalty scored); Montolivo (penalty scored); Kuzmanović (penalty scored); Santana (penalty missed); Mutu (penalty scored)	4–3	(penalty missed) Levchenko; (penalty scored) Van de Laak; (penalty missed) Lindgren; (penalty scored) Silva; (penalty scored) Lovre

Stadio Artemio Franchi, Florence
Referee: Florian Meyer (Germany)

2–2 on aggregate; Fiorentina won 4–3 on penalties.

20 September 2007

Rabotnicki (North Macedonia)	1–1	(England) Bolton Wanderers
Milisavljević 53'	Report	Méïté 83'

Philip II Arena, Skopje
Referee: Zsolt Szabó (Hungary)
4 October 2007

Bolton Wanderers (England)	1–0	(North Macedonia) Rabotnicki
Anelka 67'	Report

Reebok Stadium, Horwich
Referee: Tommy Skjerven (Norway)

Bolton Wanderers won 2–1 on aggregate.

20 September 2007

AEK Athens (Greece)	3–0	(Austria) Red Bull Salzburg
Alves 2'; Rivaldo 57'; Kone 88'	Report

Olympic Stadium, Athens
Referee: Mike Dean (England)
4 October 2007

Red Bull Salzburg (Austria)	1–0	(Greece) AEK Athens
Lokvenc 20'	Report

Red Bull Arena, Salzburg
Referee: Paolo Tagliavento (Italy)

AEK Athens won 3–1 on aggregate.

20 September 2007

1. FC Nürnberg (Germany)	0–0	(Romania) Rapid București
	Report

Frankenstadion, Nuremberg
Referee: Robert Małek (Poland)
4 October 2007

Rapid București (Romania)	2–2	(Germany) 1. FC Nürnberg
Césinha 15'; Lazăr 90+3'	Report	Kluge 22'; Misimović 56'

Stadionul Giulești-Valentin Stănescu, Bucharest
Referee: Martin Ingvarsson (Sweden)

2–2 on aggregate; 1. FC Nürnberg won on away goals.

20 September 2007
21:00

Everton (England)	1–1	(Ukraine) Metalist Kharkiv
Lescott 24'	Report	Edmar 78'

Goodison Park, Liverpool
Attendance: 37,120
Referee: Fritz Stuchlik (Austria)
4 October 2007
20:45

Metalist Kharkiv (Ukraine)	2–3	(England) Everton
Edmar 21'; Mahdoufi 52'	Report	Lescott 48'; McFadden 72'; Anichebe 88'

Metalist Stadium, Kharkiv
Attendance: 32,000
Referee: Jouni Hyytiä (Finland)

Everton won 4–3 on aggregate.

20 September 2007

Zenit Saint Petersburg (Russia)	3–0	(Belgium) Standard Liège
Arshavin 36', 65'; Kim Dong-jin 84'	Report

Petrovsky Stadium, Saint Petersburg
Referee: David Fernández Borbalán (Spain)
4 October 2007

Standard Liège (Belgium)	1–1	(Russia) Zenit Saint Petersburg
Onyewu 35'	Report	Pogrebnyak 79'

Stade Maurice Dufrasne, Liège
Referee: Craig Thomson (Scotland)

Zenit Saint Petersburg won 4–1 on aggregate.

20 September 2007

Bayer Leverkusen (Germany)	3–1	(Portugal) União de Leiria
Kießling 19', 77'; Rolfes 31'	Report	Joao Paulo 29'

BayArena, Leverkusen
Attendance: 16,000
Referee: Vladimír Hriňák (Slovakia)
4 October 2007

União de Leiria (Portugal)	3–2	(Germany) Bayer Leverkusen
Cadu 3'; João Paulo 21'; Laranjeiro 90'	Report	Papadopulos 10'; Kießling 87'

Estádio Dr. Magalhães Pessoa, Leiria
Attendance: 1,800
Referee: Costas Kapitanis (Cyprus)

Bayer Leverkusen won 5–4 on aggregate.

20 September 2007

Villarreal (Spain)	4–1	(Belarus) BATE Borisov
Nihat 6', 50'; Senna 18'; Tomasson 54'	Report	Zhavnerchik 70'

El Madrigal, Villarreal
Attendance: 15,000
Referee: Hervé Piccirillo (France)
4 October 2007

BATE Borisov (Belarus)	0–2	(Spain) Villarreal
	Report	Cani 24'; Ángel 78'

Dinamo Stadium, Minsk
Attendance: 5,500
Referee: Brade Sandmoen (Norway)

Villarreal won 6–1 on aggregate.

20 September 2007

Sion (Switzerland)	3–2	(Turkey) Galatasaray
Domínguez 6'; Vanczák 9'; Song 31' (o.g.)	Report	Lincoln 38'; Linderoth 67'

Stade de Genève, Geneva
Referee: Carlos Megía Dávila (Spain)
4 October 2007

Galatasaray (Turkey)	5–1	(Switzerland) Sion
Karan 22', 28'; Lincoln 36'; Turan 68'; Bouzid 90'	Report	Nwaneri 90'

Ali Sami Yen Stadium, Istanbul
Referee: Michael Weiner (Austria)

Galatasaray won 7–4 on aggregate.

20 September 2007

Atlético Madrid (Spain)	4–0	(Turkey) Kayseri Erciyesspor
Mista 13'; Forlán 17'; L. García 83', 90+2'	Report

Vicente Calderón, Madrid
Referee: Ruud Bossen (Netherlands)
4 October 2007

Kayseri Erciyesspor (Turkey)	0–5	(Spain) Atlético Madrid
	Report	Agüero 6', 44'; Jurado 14'; Rodríguez 53' (pen.); Forlán 79'

Kayseri Atatürk Stadium, Kayseri
Referee: Stefan Messner (Austria)

Atlético Madrid won 9–0 on aggregate.

20 September 2007

Tampere United (Finland)	2–3	(France) Bordeaux
Wiss 8'; Petrescu 69'	Report	Cavenaghi 48', 90+3'; Micoud 90+2'

Ratina Stadion, Tampere
Referee: Ceri Richards (Wales)
4 October 2007

Bordeaux (France)	1–1	(Finland) Tampere United
Chamakh 49'	Report	Ojanperä 50'

Stade Chaban-Delmas, Bordeaux
Referee: Nikolai Ivanov (Russia)

Bordeaux won 4–3 on aggregate.

20 September 2007

Artmedia Petržalka (Slovakia)	1–2	(Greece) Panathinaikos
Urbánek 46'	Report	Papadopoulos 61' (pen.); N'Doye 90'

Tehelné pole, Bratislava
Attendance: 3981
Referee: Bruno Paixão (Portugal)
2 October 2007

Panathinaikos (Greece)	3–0	(Slovakia) Artmedia Petržalka
Papadopoulos 45' (pen.), 45+2', 74' (pen.)	Report

Leoforos Alexandras Stadium, Athens
Attendance: 6,197
Referee: Serge Gumienny (Belgium)

Panathinaikos won 5–1 on aggregate.

20 September 2007

Sparta Prague (Czech Republic)	0–0	(Denmark) Odense
	Report

Generali Arena, Prague
Referee: Edo Trivković (Croatia)
4 October 2007

Odense (Denmark)	0–0 (a.e.t.)	(Czech Republic) Sparta Prague
	Report
Penalties
Sørensen (penalty missed); Borring (penalty missed); Bechara (penalty scored); Bisgaard (penalty scored); Laursen (penalty scored); Helveg (penalty missed)	3–4	(penalty scored) Horváth; (penalty missed) Brezinský; (penalty missed) Došek; (penalty scored) Kisel; (penalty scored) Kladrubský; (penalty scored) Kadlec

TRE-FOR Park, Odense
Referee: Igor Egorov (Russia)

0–0 on aggregate; Sparta Prague won 4–3 on penalties.

20 September 2007

Empoli (Italy)	2–1	(Switzerland) Zürich
Piccolo 44'; Antonini 49' (pen.)	Report	Alphonse 74'

Stadio Carlo Castellani, Empoli
Referee: Alon Yefet (Israel)
4 October 2007

Zürich (Switzerland)	3–0	(Italy) Empoli
Kollar 37'; Abdi 78'; Alphonse 82'	Report

Letzigrund, Zürich
Referee: Darko Čeferin (Slovenia)

Zürich won 4–2 on aggregate.

20 September 2007

Sochaux (France)	0–2	(Greece) Panionios
	Report	Djebbour 28'; Fernandez 54'

Stade Auguste Bonal, Montbéliard
Referee: Sorin Corpodean (Romania)
4 October 2007

Panionios (Greece)	0–1	(France) Sochaux
	Report	Kumordzi 53' (o.g.)

Nea Smyrni Stadium, Athens
Referee: Alan Kelly (Republic of Ireland)

Panionios won 2–1 on aggregate.

20 September 2007

Anderlecht (Belgium)	1–1	(Austria) Rapid Wien
Serhat 11'	Report	Hofmann 82'

Constant Vanden Stock Stadium, Brussels
Referee: Jonas Eriksson (Sweden)
4 October 2007

Rapid Wien (Austria)	0–1	(Belgium) Anderlecht
	Report	Ahmed Hassan 22'

Gerhard-Hanappi-Stadion, Vienna
Referee: Nicola Rizzoli (Italy)

Anderlecht won 2–1 on aggregate.

20 September 2007

Paços de Ferreira (Portugal)	0–1	(Netherlands) AZ
	Report	Pocognoli 89'

Estádio do Bessa, Porto
Attendance: 5,000
Referee: Peter Rasmussen (Denmark)
4 October 2007

AZ (Netherlands)	0–0	(Portugal) Paços de Ferreira
	Report

DSB Stadion, Alkmaar
Attendance: 13,418
Referee: Alexandru Tudor (Romania)

AZ won 1–0 on aggregate.

20 September 2007

Sampdoria (Italy)	2–2	(Denmark) AaB
Delvecchio 18'; Bellucci 59'	Report	Prica 19'; Johansson 54'

Stadio Luigi Ferraris, Genoa
Referee: Thomas Einwaller (Austria)
4 October 2007

AaB (Denmark)	0–0	(Italy) Sampdoria
	Report

Aalborg Stadion, Aalborg
Referee: Johan Verbist (Belgium)

2–2 on aggregate; AaB won on away goals.

20 September 2007

Spartak Moscow (Russia)	5–0	(Sweden) BK Häcken
Pavlyuchenko 6', 13', 19'; Welliton 55'; Titov 56'	Report

Luzhniki Stadium, Moscow
Referee: René Rogalla (Switzerland)
4 October 2007

BK Häcken (Sweden)	1–3	(Russia) Spartak Moscow
Henriksson 84'	Report	Titov 7'; Bazhenov 80'; Dzyuba 90+1'

Ullevi, Gothenburg
Referee: Sten Kaldma (Estonia)

Spartak Moscow won 8–1 on aggregate.

20 September 2007

Hammarby IF (Sweden)	2–1	(Portugal) Braga
Andersson 50', 66'	Report	Linz 59'

Råsunda Stadium, Solna
Attendance: 6,971
Referee: Oleh Oriekhov (Ukraine)
4 October 2007

Braga (Portugal)	4–0	(Sweden) Hammarby IF
Wender 47'; Yasser 69', 90+2'; Linz 81' (pen.)	Report

Estádio Municipal, Braga
Attendance: 9,301
Referee: Iain Brines (Scotland)

Braga won 5–2 on aggregate.

20 September 2007

AEL (Greece)	2–0	(England) Blackburn Rovers
Bakayoko 33'; Cleyton 34'	Report

Panthessaliko Stadium, Volos (Note: This match was played at Panthessaliko Stadium in Volos because AEL's ground (Alkazar Stadium in Larissa) would not meet UEFA standards.)
Referee: Peter Sippel (Germany)
4 October 2007

Blackburn Rovers (England)	2–1	(Greece) AEL
Derbyshire 45+2'; Warnock 54'	Report	Cleyton 17'

Ewood Park, Blackburn
Referee: Claudio Circhetta (Switzerland)

AEL won 3–2 on aggregate.

20 September 2007

Mladá Boleslav (Czech Republic)	0–1	(Italy) Palermo
	Report	Janković 90+1'

Městský stadion, Mladá Boleslav
Referee: Thorsten Kinhöfer (Germany)
4 October 2007

Palermo (Italy)	0–1 (a.e.t.)	(Czech Republic) Mladá Boleslav
	Report	Sedláček 90+3'
Penalties
Cavani (penalty missed); Barzagli (penalty scored); Caserta (penalty missed); Janković (penalty scored)	2–4	(penalty scored) Holub; (penalty scored) Matějovský; (penalty missed) Rolko; (penalty scored) Rajnoch; (penalty scored) Sedláček

Stadio Renzo Barbera, Palermo
Referee: Eduardo Iturralde González (Spain)

1–1 on aggregate; Mladá Boleslav won 4–2 on penalties.

20 September 2007

Dinamo Zagreb (Croatia)	0–1	(Netherlands) Ajax
	Report	Rommedahl 61'

Stadion Maksimir, Zagreb
Referee: Stéphane Lannoy (France)
4 October 2007

Ajax (Netherlands)	2–3 (a.e.t.)	(Croatia) Dinamo Zagreb
Huntelaar 101', 120'	Report	Modrić 34' (pen.); Mandžukić 94', 96'

Amsterdam Arena, Amsterdam
Referee: Mark Clattenburg (England)

3–3 on aggregate; Dinamo Zagreb won on away goals.

20 September 2007

Lokomotiv Sofia (Bulgaria)	1–3	(France) Rennes
Dafchev 51'	Report	Hansson 39'; Cheyrou 74'; Leroy 90'

Balgarska Armiya Stadium, Sofia
Referee: David Malcolm (Northern Ireland)
4 October 2007

Rennes (France)	1–2	(Bulgaria) Lokomotiv Sofia
Marveaux 25'	Report	Antunović 37', 40'

Stade de la Route de Lorient, Rennes
Referee: Kristinn Jakobsson (Iceland)

Rennes won 4–3 on aggregate.

20 September 2007

Brann (Norway)	0–1	(Belgium) Club Brugge
	Report	Sterchele 84'

Brann Stadion, Bergen
Referee: Jaroslav Jára (Czech Republic)
4 October 2007

Club Brugge (Belgium)	1–2	(Norway) Brann
Clement 76'	Report	Helstad 14'; Winters 39'

Jan Breydel Stadium, Bruges
Referee: Selçuk Dereli (Turkey)

2–2 on aggregate; Brann won on away goals.

20 September 2007

Bayern Munich (Germany)	1–0	(Portugal) Belenenses
Toni 34'	Report

Allianz Arena, Munich
Attendance: 64,000
Referee: Stefan Johannesson (Sweden)
4 October 2007

Belenenses (Portugal)	0–2	(Germany) Bayern Munich
	Report	Toni 59'; Altıntop 79'

Estádio do Restelo, Lisbon
Attendance: 7,000
Referee: Jacek Granat (Poland)

Bayern Munich won 3–0 on aggregate.

20 September 2007
20:00

Aberdeen (Scotland)	0–0	(Ukraine) Dnipro Dnipropetrovsk
	Report

Pittodrie Stadium, Aberdeen
Attendance: 20,000
Referee: Espen Berntsen (Norway)
4 October 2007
19:00

Dnipro Dnipropetrovsk (Ukraine)	1–1	(Scotland) Aberdeen
Vorobey 76'	Report	Mackie 28'

Meteor Stadium, Dnipropetrovsk
Attendance: 18,655
Referee: Olivier Thual (France)

1–1 on aggregate; Aberdeen won on away goals.

20 September 2007
20:45

Heerenveen (Netherlands)	5–3	(Sweden) Helsingborgs IF
Bradley 20', 60'; Sibon 30', 35'; Nielsen 59'	Report	Larsson 53', 71' (pen.); Omotoyossi 57'

Abe Lenstra Stadion, Heerenveen
Referee: Novo Panić (Bosnia and Herzegovina)
4 October 2007
20:45

Helsingborgs IF (Sweden)	5–1	(Netherlands) Heerenveen
Larsson 18'; Dahl 37'; Omotoyossi 45+1', 80'; Makondele 51'	Report	Sibon 89'

Olympia, Helsingborg
Referee: Gerald Lehner (Austria)

Helsingborgs IF won 8–6 on aggregate.

20 September 2007

Toulouse (France)	0–0	(Bulgaria) CSKA Sofia
	Report

Stadium Municipal, Toulouse
Referee: Nicolai Vollquartz (Denmark)
4 October 2007

CSKA Sofia (Bulgaria)	1–1	(France) Toulouse
Nei 65' (pen.)	Report	Gignac 90+5'

Balgarska Armia Stadium, Sofia
Referee: Bernhard Brugger (Austria)

1–1 on aggregate; Toulouse won on away goals.

18 September 2007

Litex Lovech (Bulgaria)	0–1	(Germany) Hamburger SV
	Report	Castelen 75'

Lovech Stadium, Lovech
Referee: Tony Asumaa (Finland)
4 October 2007

Hamburger SV (Germany)	3–1	(Bulgaria) Litex Lovech
Guerrero 40', 52'; Van der Vaart 71'	Report	R. Popov 38'

Volksparkstadion, Hamburg
Referee: Paul Allaerts (Belgium)

Hamburger SV won 4–1 on aggregate.

20 September 2007
20:00

Sarajevo (Bosnia and Herzegovina)	1–2	(Switzerland) Basel
Milošević 90+3'	Report	Carlitos 11'; Ergić 63'

Asim Ferhatović Hase Stadium, Sarajevo
Attendance: 6,000
Referee: Romāns Lajuks (Latvia)
4 October 2007
19:30

Basel (Switzerland)	6–0	(Bosnia and Herzegovina) Sarajevo
Carlitos 8', 9'; Streller 19', 29'; Huggel 75'; Caicedo 90+1'	Report

St. Jakob-Park, Basel
Attendance: 15,124
Referee: Paulo Costa (Portugal)

Basel won 8–1 on aggregate.

20 September 2007

Austria Wien	2–0	(Norway) Vålerenga
Kuljić 41'; Lasnik 62'	Report

Franz Horr Stadium, Vienna
Referee: Dougie McDonald (Scotland)
4 October 2007

Vålerenga (Norway)	2–2	Austria Wien
Dos Santos 51'; Holm 87'	Report	Kuljić 22'; Ačimovič 90+1'

Ullevaal Stadion, Oslo
Referee: Radek Matějek (Czech Republic)

Austria Wien won 4–2 on aggregate.

20 September 2007

Hapoel Tel Aviv (Israel)	0–0	(Sweden) AIK
	Report

Bloomfield Stadium, Tel Aviv
Referee: Stanislav Sukhina (Russia)
4 October 2007

AIK (Sweden)	0–1	(Israel) Hapoel Tel Aviv
	Report	Oved 64'

Råsunda Stadium, Solna
Referee: Rob Styles (England)

Hapoel Tel Aviv won 1–0 on aggregate.

20 September 2007

Aris (Greece)	1–0	(Spain) Zaragoza
Papadopoulos 6'	Report

Kleanthis Vikelidis Stadium, Thessaloniki
Referee: Viktor Kassai (Hungary)
4 October 2007

Zaragoza (Spain)	2–1	(Greece) Aris
Oliveira 19'; S. García 72'	Report	Javito 63'

La Romareda, Zaragoza
Referee: Stuart Dougal (Scotland)

2–2 on aggregate; Aris won on away goals.

20 September 2007

Dinamo București (Romania)	1–2	(Sweden) IF Elfsborg
Niculescu 8'	Report	Keene 10', 30'

Stadionul Dinamo, Bucharest
Referee: João Ferreira (Portugal)
4 October 2007

IF Elfsborg (Sweden)	0–1	(Romania) Dinamo București
	Report	Dănciulescu 31'

Borås Arena, Borås
Referee: Mark Courtney (Northern Ireland)

2–2 on aggregate; IF Elfsborg won on away goals.

20 September 2007

Tottenham Hotspur (England)	6–1	(Cyprus) Anorthosis Famagusta
Kaboul 5'; Dawson 39'; Keane 42'; Bent 43'; Defoe 65', 90+1'	Report	Žlogar 80'

White Hart Lane, London
Attendance: 35,780
Referee: Paolo Dondarini (Italy)
4 October 2007

Anorthosis Famagusta (Cyprus)	1–1	(England) Tottenham Hotspur
Fabinho 54'	Report	Keane 78'

Antonis Papadopoulos Stadium, Larnaca
Attendance: 8,000
Referee: Pavel Královec (Czech Republic)

Tottenham Hotspur won 7–2 on aggregate.

19 September 2007

Lens (France)	1–1	(Denmark) Copenhagen
Dindane 70'	Report	Allbäck 5'

Stade Félix-Bollaert, Lens
Referee: Damir Skomina (Slovenia)
4 October 2007

Copenhagen (Denmark)	2–1 (a.e.t.)	(France) Lens
Allbäck 76'; Grønkjær 112'	Report	Carrière 13'

Parken Stadium, Copenhagen
Referee: Duarte Gomes (Portugal)

Copenhagen won 3–2 on aggregate.

20 September 2007

Getafe (Spain)	1–0	(Netherlands) Twente
Uche 90+1'	Report

Coliseum Alfonso Pérez, Getafe
Referee: Charlie Richmond (Scotland)
4 October 2007

Twente (Netherlands)	3–2 (a.e.t.)	(Spain) Getafe
Wielaert 30'; Engelaar 117'; Zomer 120'	Report	Belenguer 101'; Granero 103'

De Grolsch Veste, Enschede
Referee: Ivan Bebek (Croatia)

3–3 on aggregate; Getafe won on away goals.

20 September 2007

Groclin Grodzisk Wielkopolski (Poland)	0–1	(Serbia) Crvena zvezda
	Report	Basta 19'

Stadion Dyskobolia, Grodzisk Wielkopolski
Referee: Levan Paniashvili (Georgia)
4 October 2007

Crvena zvezda (Serbia)	1–0	(Poland) Groclin Grodzisk Wielkopolski
Castillo 43'	Report

Red Star Stadium, Belgrade
Referee: Cristian Balaj (Romania)

Crvena zvezda won 2–0 on aggregate.
