= 2007–08 UEFA Cup =

37th season of Europe's secondary club football tournament organised by UEFA

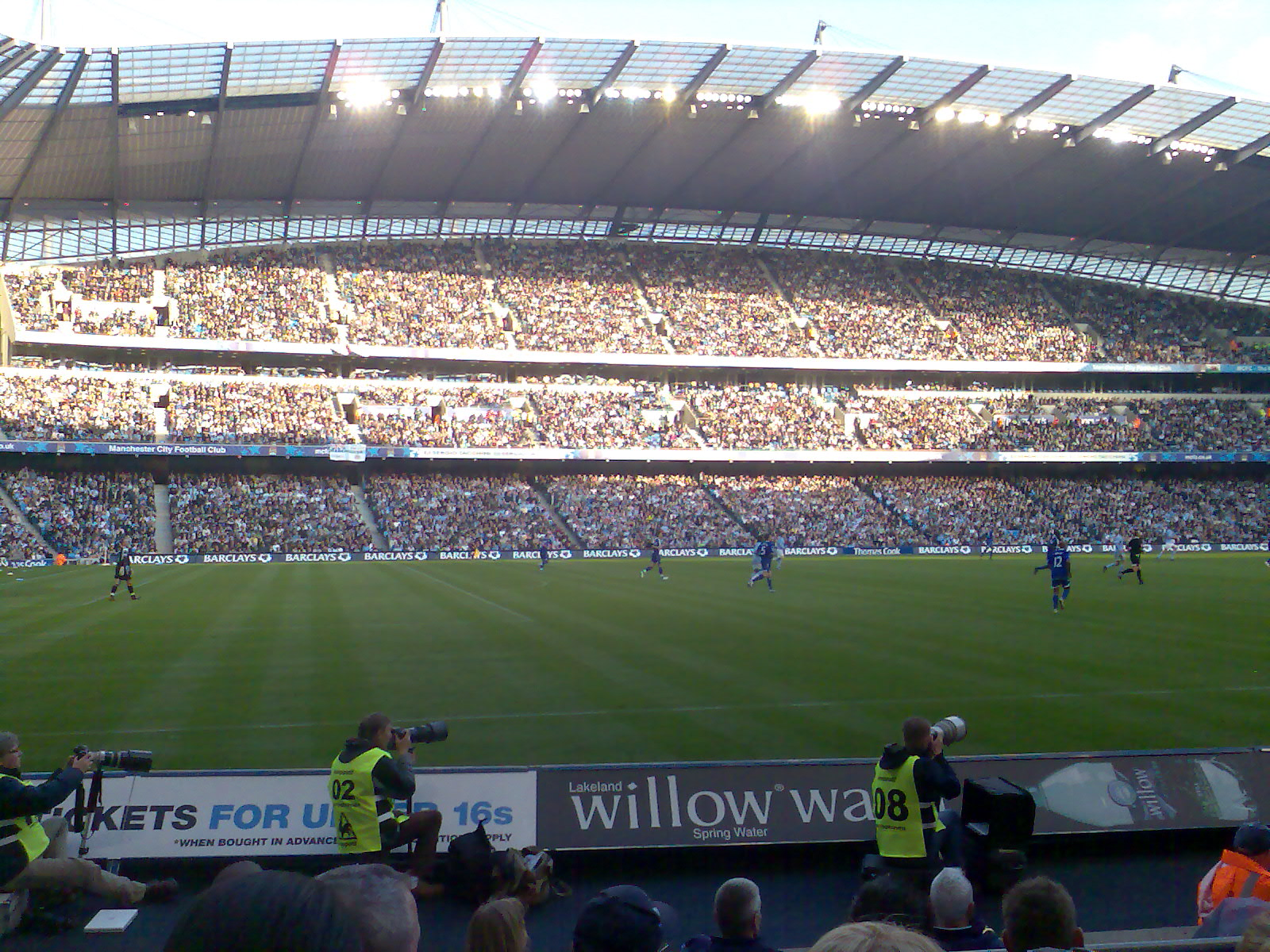
- City of Manchester Stadium in Manchester hosted the final.

Tournament details
- Dates: 20 September 2007 – 14 May 2008
- Teams: 80

Final positions
- Champions: (Russia) Zenit Saint Petersburg (1st title)
- Runners-up: (Scotland) Rangers

Tournament statistics
- Matches played: 221
- Goals scored: 563 (2.55 per match)
- Top scorer(s): Pavel Pogrebnyak (Zenit Saint Petersburg); Luca Toni (Bayern Munich); 10 goals each

The 2007–08 UEFA Cup was the 37th edition of the UEFA Cup, UEFA's former second-tier club football tournament. The final was played at the City of Manchester Stadium, Manchester, England on 14 May 2008 between Rangers of Scotland and Zenit Saint Petersburg of Russia. Zenit won the match 2–0, with goals from Igor Denisov and Konstantin Zyryanov, to claim their first UEFA Cup title. The first qualifying games were played on 19 July 2007 and the main tournament commenced on 20 September 2007. A total of 157 football clubs took part in the tournament (including its qualifying rounds).

Each European football nation is represented by a different number of its associate clubs, depending on the UEFA coefficients. Budućnost Podgorica and Rudar Pljevlja were the first teams from Montenegro to enter the competition.

The semi-final between Zenit and Bayern Munich was alleged to have been fixed. Both clubs denied the allegations, and the UEFA probe found no wrongdoing on either part.

Sevilla could not defend their title as they automatically qualified for the 2007–08 UEFA Champions League and also reached the knockout stage.

The tournament's top scorers were Pavel Pogrebnyak of Zenit Saint Petersburg and Luca Toni of Bayern Munich, each with 10 goals.

== Association team allocation ==
A total of 157 teams from all 53 UEFA member associations participated in the 2007–08 UEFA Cup. The association ranking based on the UEFA country coefficients was used to determine the number of participating teams for each association:

- Associations 1–6 and 16–21 each had three teams qualify.
- Associations 7–8 each had four teams qualify.
- Associations 9–15 and 22–53 (except Liechtenstein, San Marino and Andorra) each had two teams qualify.
- Liechtenstein (as they organized only a domestic cup and no domestic league), San Marino and Andorra had only one team that qualified.

Moreover, the following teams also qualified for the competition:

- 24 teams eliminated from the 2007–08 UEFA Champions League were transferred to the UEFA Cup.
- 11 teams advancing from the 2007 UEFA Intertoto Cup were transferred to the UEFA Cup.
- 3 associations had one additional team qualify via the UEFA Respect Fair Play ranking.

=== Association ranking ===
For the 2007–08 UEFA Cup, the associations were allocated places according to their 2006 UEFA country coefficients, which took into account their performance in European competitions from 2001–02 to 2005–06.

Apart from the allocation based on the country coefficients, associations could have additional teams participating in the UEFA Cup, as noted below:

- (UCL) – Additional teams transferred from the UEFA Champions League
- (IC) – Additional teams transferred from the UEFA Intertoto Cup
- (FP) – Additional berth via Fair Play ranking

Association ranking for 2007–08 UEFA Cup

| Rank | Association | Coeff. | Teams | Notes |
|---|---|---|---|---|
| 1 | Spain | 72.748 | 3 | +1 (IC) |
| 2 | Italy | 66.731 | 3 | +1 (IC) |
| 3 | England | 63.486 | 3 | +1 (IC) |
| 4 | France | 50.781 | 3 | +1 (IC) +2 (UCL) |
| 5 | Germany | 48.364 | 3 | +1 (IC) +1 (UCL) |
| 6 | Portugal | 44.041 | 3 | +1 (IC) +2 (UCL) |
| 7 | Netherlands | 41.331 | 4 | +2 (UCL) |
| 8 | Greece | 32.081 | 4 | +1 (UCL) |
| 9 | Russia | 31.833 | 2 | +1 (UCL) |
| 10 | Romania | 31.457 | 2 | +1 (IC) +1 (UCL) |
| 11 | Scotland | 30.375 | 2 | +1 (UCL) |
| 12 | Belgium | 30.250 | 2 | +1 (UCL) |
| 13 | Ukraine | 26.600 | 2 | |
| 14 | Czech Republic | 26.575 | 2 | +2 (UCL) |
| 15 | Turkey | 26.166 | 2 | |
| 16 | Switzerland | 25.875 | 3 | +1 (UCL) |
| 17 | Bulgaria | 24.290 | 3 | |
| 18 | Israel | 21.541 | 3 | |

| Rank | Association | Coeff. | Teams | Notes |
|---|---|---|---|---|
| 19 | Norway | 20.975 | 3 | +1 (FP) +1 (UCL) |
| 20 | Austria | 20.375 | 3 | +1 (IC) +1 (UCL) |
| 21 | Serbia | 19.999 | 3 | +1 (UCL) |
| 22 | Poland | 18.500 | 2 | |
| 23 | Denmark | 16.950 | 2 | +1 (IC) +1 (UCL) |
| 24 | Hungary | 14.665 | 2 | |
| 25 | Croatia | 14.083 | 2 | +1 (UCL) |
| 26 | Sweden | 13.249 | 2 | +1 (FP) +1 (IC) +1 (UCL) |
| 27 | Slovakia | 12.332 | 2 | |
| 28 | Cyprus | 10.165 | 2 | |
| 29 | Slovenia | 10.165 | 2 | |
| 30 | Bosnia and Herzegovina | 8.165 | 2 | +1 (UCL) |
| 31 | Finland | 7.373 | 2 | +1 (FP) +1 (UCL) |
| 32 | Latvia | 7.164 | 2 | |
| 33 | Moldova | 6.832 | 2 | |
| 34 | Georgia | 6.331 | 2 | |
| 35 | Lithuania | 5.832 | 2 | |
| 36 | Macedonia | 5.331 | 2 | |

| Rank | Association | Coeff. | Teams | Notes |
|---|---|---|---|---|
| 37 | Iceland | 4.832 | 2 | |
| 38 | Liechtenstein | 4.500 | 1 | |
| 39 | Belarus | 4.415 | 2 | +1 (UCL) |
| 40 | Republic of Ireland | 4.331 | 2 | |
| 41 | Albania | 3.665 | 2 | |
| 42 | Armenia | 2.998 | 2 | |
| 43 | Estonia | 2.665 | 2 | |
| 44 | Malta | 2.665 | 2 | |
| 45 | Wales | 2.332 | 2 | |
| 46 | Northern Ireland | 2.332 | 2 | |
| 47 | Azerbaijan | 1.999 | 2 | |
| 48 | Luxembourg | 1.832 | 2 | |
| 49 | Kazakhstan | 1.666 | 2 | +1 (IC) |
| 50 | Faroe Islands | 1.665 | 2 | |
| 51 | San Marino | 0.000 | 1 | |
| 52 | Andorra | 0.000 | 1 | |
| 53 | Montenegro | 0.000 | 2 | |

=== Distribution ===
The following was the access list for this season.

Access list for 2007–08 UEFA Cup
| Round | Teams entering in this round | Teams advancing from the previous round | Teams transferred from Champions League or Intertoto Cup |
|---|---|---|---|
| First qualifying round (74 teams) | 33 domestic cup winners from associations 21–53; 32 domestic league runners-up from associations 19–53 (except Liechtenstein, San Marino and Andorra); 6 domestic league third-placed teams from associations 16–21; 3 teams which qualified via Fair Play ranking | | |
| Second qualifying round (64 teams) | 6 domestic cup winners from associations 15–20; 3 domestic league runners-up from associations 16–18; 7 domestic league third-placed teams from associations 9–15 | 37 winners from the first qualifying round | 11 winners from UEFA Intertoto Cup third round |
| First round (80 teams) | 14 domestic cup winners from associations 1–14; 2 domestic league third-placed teams from associations 7–8; 5 domestic league fourth-placed teams from associations 4–8; 8 domestic league fifth-placed teams from associations 1–8 (league cup winners for France); 3 domestic league sixth-placed teams from associations 1–3 (league cup winners for England) | 32 winners from the second qualifying round | 16 losers from Champions League third qualifying round |
| Group stage (40 teams) | | 40 winners from the first round | |
| Knockout stage (32 teams) | | 8 group winners from the group stage; 8 group runners-up from the group stage; 8 group third-placed teams from the group stage | 8 group third-placed teams from Champions League group stage |

Due to the UEFA Cup title holder (Sevilla) qualifying for the Champions League via their domestic league, the following changes to the access list were made:

- The cup winners of association 14 (Czech Republic) entered the UEFA Cup first round instead of the second qualifying round.
- The cup winners of association 19 and 20 (Norway and Austria) entered the UEFA Cup second qualifying round instead of the first qualifying round.

=== Teams ===
The labels in the parentheses show how each team qualified for the place of its starting round:

- CW: Domestic cup winners
- CR: Domestic cup runners-up
- 1st, 2nd, 3rd, etc.: League position of the previous season
- LC: League cup winners
- PO: End-of-season UEFA Cup play-offs winners
- IC: Intertoto Cup third round winners
- FP: Qualified via Fair Play ranking
- CL: Transferred from the Champions League
  - Q3: Losers from the third qualifying round
  - GS: Third-placed teams from the group stage

Round of 32
| (France) Marseille (CL GS) | (Portugal) Sporting CP (CL GS) | (Netherlands) PSV Eindhoven (CL GS) | (Czech Republic) Slavia Prague (CL GS) |
| (Germany) Werder Bremen (CL GS) | (Portugal) Benfica (CL GS) | (Scotland) Rangers (CL GS) | (Norway) Rosenborg (CL GS) |
First round
| (Spain) Villarreal (5th) | (Germany) 1. FC Nürnberg (CW) | (Greece) Aris (4th) | (Romania) Dinamo București (CL Q3) |
| (Spain) Zaragoza (6th) | (Germany) Bayern Munich (4th) | (Greece) Panionios (5th) | (Belgium) Anderlecht (CL Q3) |
| (Spain) Getafe (CR) | (Germany) Bayer Leverkusen (5th) | (Russia) Lokomotiv Moscow (CW) | (Czech Republic) Sparta Prague (CL Q3) |
| (Italy) Palermo (5th) | (Portugal) Braga (4th) | (Romania) Rapid București (CW) | (Switzerland) Zürich (CL Q3) |
| (Italy) Fiorentina (6th) | (Portugal) Belenenses (5th) | (Scotland) Aberdeen (3rd) | (Austria) Red Bull Salzburg (CL Q3) |
| (Italy) Empoli (7th) | (Portugal) Paços de Ferreira (6th) | (Belgium) Club Brugge (CW) | (Serbia) Crvena zvezda (CL Q3) |
| (England) Tottenham Hotspur (5th) | (Netherlands) AZ (PO) | (Ukraine) Metalist Kharkiv (3rd) | (Denmark) Copenhagen (CL Q3) |
| (England) Everton (6th) | (Netherlands) Twente (PO) | (Czech Republic) Mladá Boleslav (3rd) | (Croatia) Dinamo Zagreb (CL Q3) |
| (England) Bolton Wanderers (7th) | (Netherlands) Heerenveen (PO) | (France) Toulouse (CL Q3) | (Sweden) IF Elfsborg (CL Q3) |
| (France) Sochaux (CW) | (Netherlands) Groningen (PO) | (Netherlands) Ajax (CL Q3) | (Bosnia and Herzegovina) Sarajevo (CL Q3) |
| (France) Rennes (4th) | (Greece) AEL (CW) | (Greece) AEK Athens (CL Q3) | (Finland) Tampere United (CL Q3) |
| (France) Bordeaux (LC) | (Greece) Panathinaikos (3rd) | (Russia) Spartak Moscow (CL Q3) | (Belarus) BATE Borisov (CL Q3) |
Second qualifying round
| (Russia) Zenit Saint Petersburg (4th) | (Turkey) Kayseri Erciyesspor (CR) | (Norway) Fredrikstad (CW) | (Portugal) União de Leiria (IC) |
| (Romania) CFR Cluj (3rd) | (Switzerland) Basel (CW) | Austria Wien (CW) | (Romania) Oțelul Galați (IC) |
| (Scotland) Dunfermline Athletic (CR) | (Switzerland) Sion (3rd) | (Spain) Atlético Madrid (IC) | (Austria) Rapid Wien (IC) |
| (Belgium) Standard Liège (3rd) | (Bulgaria) CSKA Sofia (2nd) | (Italy) Sampdoria (IC) | (Denmark) AaB (IC) |
| (Ukraine) Dnipro Dnipropetrovsk (4th) | (Bulgaria) Lokomotiv Sofia (3rd) | (England) Blackburn Rovers (IC) | (Sweden) Hammarby IF (IC) |
| (Czech Republic) Jablonec (CR) | (Israel) Hapoel Tel Aviv (CW) | (France) Lens (IC) | (Kazakhstan) Tobol (IC) |
| (Turkey) Galatasaray (3rd) | (Israel) Maccabi Netanya (2nd) | (Germany) Hamburger SV (IC) | |
First qualifying round
| (Switzerland) Young Boys (4th) | (Sweden) AIK (2nd) | (North Macedonia) Vardar (CW) | (Wales) Rhyl (2nd) |
| (Bulgaria) Litex Lovech (4th) | (Slovakia) ViOn Zlaté Moravce (CW) | (North Macedonia) Rabotnicki (2nd) | (Northern Ireland) Glentoran (2nd) |
| (Israel) Maccabi Tel Aviv (3rd) | (Slovakia) Artmedia Petržalka (2nd) | (Iceland) Keflavík (CW) | (Northern Ireland) Dungannon Swifts (CR) |
| (Norway) Brann (2nd) | (Cyprus) Anorthosis Famagusta (CW) | (Iceland) KR (2nd) | (Azerbaijan) Neftçi (2nd) |
| (Norway) Vålerenga (3rd) | (Cyprus) Omonia (2nd) | (Liechtenstein) Vaduz (CW) | (Azerbaijan) MKT Araz (CR) |
| (Austria) Ried (2nd) | (Slovenia) Koper (CW) | (Belarus) Dynamo Brest (CW) | (Luxembourg) Etzella Ettelbruck (2nd) |
| (Austria) Mattersburg (3rd) | (Slovenia) HIT Gorica (2nd) | (Belarus) Dinamo Minsk (2nd) | (Luxembourg) Käerjéng 97 (CR) |
| (Serbia) Partizan (2nd) | (Bosnia and Herzegovina) Široki Brijeg (CW) | (Republic of Ireland) Drogheda United (3rd) | (Kazakhstan) Alma-Ata (CW) |
| (Serbia) Vojvodina (3rd) | (Bosnia and Herzegovina) Zrinjski Mostar (2nd) | (Republic of Ireland) St Patrick's Athletic (CR) | (Kazakhstan) Aktobe (3rd) |
| (Serbia) Bežanija (4th) | (Finland) HJK (CW) | (Albania) Besa (CW) | (Faroe Islands) B36 (CW) |
| (Poland) Groclin Grodzisk Wielkopolski (CW) | (Finland) Haka (3rd) | (Albania) Teuta (2nd) | (Faroe Islands) EB/Streymur (2nd) |
| (Poland) Bełchatów (2nd) | (Latvia) Liepājas Metalurgs (CW) | (Armenia) Banants (CW) | (San Marino) Libertas (CR) |
| (Denmark) Odense (CW) | (Latvia) Skonto (3rd) | (Armenia) Mika (3rd) | (Andorra) FC Santa Coloma (CW) |
| (Denmark) Midtjylland (2nd) | (Moldova) Zimbru Chișinău (CW) | (Estonia) Narva Trans (2nd) | (Montenegro) Rudar Pljevlja (CW) |
| (Hungary) Honvéd (CW) | (Moldova) Nistru Otaci (3rd) | (Estonia) Flora (3rd) | (Montenegro) Budućnost Podgorica (2nd) |
| (Hungary) MTK Budapest (2nd) | (Georgia (country)) Ameri Tbilisi (CW) | (Malta) Hibernians (CW) | (Sweden) BK Häcken (FP) |
| (Croatia) Hajduk Split (2nd) | (Georgia (country)) Dinamo Tbilisi (2nd) | (Malta) Sliema Wanderers (2nd) | (Norway) Lillestrøm (FP) |
| (Croatia) Slaven Belupo (CR) | (Lithuania) Sūduva (CW) | (Wales) Carmarthen Town (CW) | (Finland) MYPA (FP) |
| (Sweden) Helsingborgs IF (CW) | (Lithuania) Ekranas (2nd) | | |

Notes

1. Republic of Ireland (IRL): Second-placed Derry City (also 2006 FAI Cup winners) were admitted to Champions League after last year champions Shelbourne were denied a Premier Division licence for 2007 due to financial violations. FAI Cup runners-up St Patrick's Athletic were added to the UEFA Cup to fill for Derry City.

== Round and draw dates ==
Schedule for 2007–08 UEFA Cup
| Phase | Round | Draw date | First leg | Second leg |
|---|---|---|---|---|
| Qualifying | First qualifying round | 29 June 2007 | 19 July 2007 | 2 August 2007 |
| Qualifying | Second qualifying round | 3 August 2007 | 16 August 2007 | 30 August 2007 |
| First round | | 31 August 2007 | 20 September 2007 | 4 October 2007 |
| Group stage | Matchday 1 | 9 October 2007 | 25 October 2007 | |
| Group stage | Matchday 2 | 9 October 2007 | 8 November 2007 | |
| Group stage | Matchday 3 | 9 October 2007 | 29 November 2007 | |
| Group stage | Matchday 4 | 9 October 2007 | 5–6 December 2007 | |
| Group stage | Matchday 5 | 9 October 2007 | 19–20 December 2007 | |
| Knockout stage | Round of 32 | 21 December 2007 | 13–14 February 2008 | 21 February 2008 |
| Knockout stage | Round of 16 | 21 December 2007 | 6 March 2008 | 12–13 March 2008 |
| Knockout stage | Quarter-finals | 14 March 2008 | 3 April 2008 | 10 April 2008 |
| Knockout stage | Semi-finals | 14 March 2008 | 24 April 2008 | 1 May 2008 |
| Knockout stage | Final | 14 March 2008 | 14 May 2008 at City of Manchester Stadium, Manchester | |

== Qualifying rounds ==
=== First qualifying round ===
The draw, which was conducted by UEFA General Secretary David Taylor and Michele Centenaro, UEFA's head of club competitions, was held on Friday, 29 June 2007 at 13:30 CET in Nyon, Switzerland. The matches were played on 19 July and 2 August 2007.

| Team 1 | Agg. | Team 2 | 1st leg | 2nd leg |
|---|---|---|---|---|
Southern region
| Budućnost Podgorica (Montenegro) | 1–2 | (Croatia) Hajduk Split | 1–1 | 0–1 |
| Omonia (Cyprus) | 4–0 | (Montenegro) Rudar Pljevlja | 2–0 | 2–0 |
| Slaven Belupo (Croatia) | 8–4 | (Albania) Teuta | 6–2 | 2–2 |
| Bežanija (Serbia) | 2–2 (a) | (Albania) Besa | 2–2 | 0–0 |
| Sliema Wanderers (Malta) | 0–7 | (Bulgaria) Litex Lovech | 0–3 | 0–4 |
| Vojvodina (Serbia) | 7–1 | (Malta) Hibernians | 5–1 | 2–0 |
| FC Santa Coloma (Andorra) | 1–4 | (Israel) Maccabi Tel Aviv | 1–0 | 0–4 |
| Široki Brijeg (Bosnia and Herzegovina) | 6–3 | (Slovenia) Koper | 3–1 | 3–2 |
| Vardar (North Macedonia) | 0–2 | (Cyprus) Anorthosis Famagusta | 0–1 | 0–1 |
| HIT Gorica (Slovenia) | 2–4 | (North Macedonia) Rabotnicki | 1–2 | 1–2 |
| Zrinjski Mostar (Bosnia and Herzegovina) | w/o (Note: UEFA expelled Partizan from the 2007–08 UEFA Cup due to crowd trouble at their away tie in Mostar, which forced the match to be interrupted for 10 minutes. UEFA adjudged travelling Partizan fans to have been the culprits of the trouble, but Partizan were allowed to play the return leg while the appeal was being processed. However, Partizan's appeal was rejected so Zrinjski Mostar advanced on a walkover.) | (Serbia) Partizan | 1–6 | 0–5 |
Central–East region
| ViOn Zlaté Moravce (Slovakia) | 4–2 | (Kazakhstan) Alma-Ata | 3–1 | 1–1 |
| MTK Budapest (Hungary) | 2–2 (a) | (Armenia) Mika | 2–1 | 0–1 |
| MKT Araz (Azerbaijan) | 0–1 | (Poland) Groclin Grodzisk Wielkopolski | 0–0 | 0–1 |
| Bełchatów (Poland) | 2–2 (4–2 p) | (Georgia (country)) Ameri Tbilisi | 2–0 | 0–2 (a.e.t.) |
| Artmedia Petržalka (Slovakia) | 3–3 (a) | (Moldova) Zimbru Chișinău | 1–1 | 2–2 |
| Banants (Armenia) | 1–5 | (Switzerland) Young Boys | 1–1 | 0–4 |
| Nistru Otaci (Moldova) | 2–2 (4–5 p) | (Hungary) Honvéd | 1–1 | 1–1 (a.e.t.) |
| Ried (Austria) | 4–3 | (Azerbaijan) Neftçi | 3–1 | 1–2 |
| Dinamo Tbilisi (Georgia (country)) | 2–0 | (Liechtenstein) Vaduz | 2–0 | 0–0 |
| Aktobe (Kazakhstan) | 3–4 | (Austria) Mattersburg | 1–0 | 2–4 |
Northern region
| B36 (Faroe Islands) | 3–6 | (Lithuania) Ekranas | 1–3 | 2–3 |
| Libertas (San Marino) | 1–4 | (Republic of Ireland) Drogheda United | 1–1 | 0–3 |
| Rhyl (Wales) | 3–3 (a) | (Finland) Haka | 3–1 | 0–2 |
| Carmarthen Town (Wales) | 3–14 | (Norway) Brann | 0–8 | 3–6 |
| Flora (Estonia) | 0–2 | (Norway) Vålerenga | 0–1 | 0–1 |
| MYPA (Finland) | 2–1 | (Faroe Islands) EB/Streymur | 1–0 | 1–1 |
| Dungannon Swifts (Northern Ireland) | 1–4 | (Lithuania) Sūduva | 1–0 | 0–4 |
| Lillestrøm (Norway) | 2–2 (a) | (Luxembourg) Käerjéng 97 | 2–1 | 0–1 |
| Liepājas Metalurgs (Latvia) | 3–2 | (Belarus) Dynamo Brest | 1–1 | 2–1 |
| Helsingborgs IF (Sweden) | 9–0 | (Estonia) Narva Trans | 6–0 | 3–0 |
| Keflavík (Iceland) | 4–4 (a) | (Denmark) Midtjylland | 3–2 | 1–2 |
| BK Häcken (Sweden) | 2–1 | (Iceland) KR | 1–1 | 1–0 |
| St Patrick's Athletic (Republic of Ireland) | 0–5 | (Denmark) Odense | 0–0 | 0–5 |
| HJK (Finland) | 3–0 | (Luxembourg) Etzella Ettelbruck | 2–0 | 1–0 |
| Glentoran (Northern Ireland) | 0–9 | (Sweden) AIK | 0–5 | 0–4 |
| Skonto (Latvia) | 1–3 | (Belarus) Dinamo Minsk | 1–1 | 0–2 |

=== Second qualifying round ===
The draw, which was conducted by UEFA General Secretary David Taylor and Giorgio Marchetti, UEFA's director of professional football, was held on Friday, 3 August 2007 at 13:00 CET in Nyon, Switzerland. The matches were played on 16 and 30 August 2007.

| Team 1 | Agg. | Team 2 | 1st leg | 2nd leg |
|---|---|---|---|---|
Southern region
| Lokomotiv Sofia (Bulgaria) | 3–1 | (Romania) Oțelul Galați | 3–1 | 0–0 |
| CFR Cluj (Romania) | 1–3 | (Cyprus) Anorthosis Famagusta | 1–3 | 0–0 |
| Rabotnicki (North Macedonia) | 2–1 | (Bosnia and Herzegovina) Zrinjski Mostar | 0–0 | 2–1 |
| Slaven Belupo (Croatia) | 2–4 | (Turkey) Galatasaray | 1–2 | 1–2 |
| União de Leiria (Portugal) | 1–0 | (Israel) Maccabi Netanya | 0–0 | 1–0 |
| Hajduk Split (Croatia) | 1–2 | (Italy) Sampdoria | 0–1 | 1–1 |
| Besa (Albania) | 0–6 | (Bulgaria) Litex Lovech | 0–3 | 0–3 |
| Maccabi Tel Aviv (Israel) | 2–4 | (Turkey) Kayseri Erciyesspor | 1–1 | 1–3 |
| Atlético Madrid (Spain) | 5–1 | (Serbia) Vojvodina | 3–0 | 2–1 |
| Široki Brijeg (Bosnia and Herzegovina) | 0–6 | (Israel) Hapoel Tel Aviv | 0–3 | 0–3 |
| Omonia (Cyprus) | 2–3 | (Bulgaria) CSKA Sofia | 1–1 | 1–2 |
Central–East region
| Basel (Switzerland) | 6–1 | (Austria) Mattersburg | 2–1 | 4–0 |
| Ried (Austria) | 1–4 | (Switzerland) Sion | 1–1 | 0–3 |
| Mika (Armenia) | 2–3 | (Slovakia) Artmedia Petržalka | 2–1 | 0–2 |
| Dnipro Dnipropetrovsk (Ukraine) | 5–3 | (Poland) Bełchatów | 1–1 | 4–2 |
| Honvéd (Hungary) | 0–4 | (Germany) Hamburger SV | 0–0 | 0–4 |
| Young Boys (Switzerland) | 2–6 | (France) Lens | 1–1 | 1–5 |
| Tobol (Kazakhstan) | 0–3 | (Poland) Groclin Grodzisk Wielkopolski | 0–1 | 0–2 |
| Austria Wien | 5–4 | (Czech Republic) Jablonec | 4–3 | 1–1 |
| ViOn Zlaté Moravce (Slovakia) | 0–5 | (Russia) Zenit Saint Petersburg | 0–2 | 0–3 |
| Dinamo Tbilisi (Georgia (country)) | 0–8 | (Austria) Rapid Wien | 0–3 | 0–5 |
Northern region
| MYPA (Finland) | 0–3 | (England) Blackburn Rovers | 0–1 | 0–2 |
| Drogheda United (Republic of Ireland) | 1–4 | (Sweden) Helsingborgs IF | 1–1 | 0–3 |
| Liepājas Metalurgs (Latvia) | 3–4 | (Sweden) AIK | 3–2 | 0–2 |
| HJK (Finland) | 2–4 | (Denmark) AaB | 2–1 | 0–3 |
| Ekranas (Lithuania) | 1–7 | (Norway) Vålerenga | 1–1 | 0–6 |
| Dunfermline Athletic (Scotland) | 1–2 | (Sweden) BK Häcken | 1–1 | 0–1 |
| Brann (Norway) | 6–4 | (Lithuania) Sūduva | 2–1 | 4–3 |
| Haka (Finland) | 3–7 | (Denmark) Midtjylland | 1–2 | 2–5 |
| Dinamo Minsk (Belarus) | 1–5 | (Denmark) Odense | 1–1 | 0–4 |
| Käerjéng 97 (Luxembourg) | 0–4 | (Belgium) Standard Liège | 0–3 | 0–1 |
| Hammarby IF (Sweden) | 3–2 | (Norway) Fredrikstad | 2–1 | 1–1 |

== First round ==
The draw, which was conducted by UEFA General Secretary David Taylor and Gérard Houllier, the winning coach in the 2000–01 tournament, was held on Friday, 31 August 2007 at 13:00 CET in Monaco. The matches were played on 20 September and 4 October 2007.

| Team 1 | Agg. | Team 2 | 1st leg | 2nd leg |
|---|---|---|---|---|
| Midtjylland (Denmark) | 1–5 | (Russia) Lokomotiv Moscow | 1–3 | 0–2 |
| Groningen (Netherlands) | 2–2 (3–4 p) | (Italy) Fiorentina | 1–1 | 1–1 (a.e.t.) |
| Rabotnicki (North Macedonia) | 1–2 | (England) Bolton Wanderers | 1–1 | 0–1 |
| AEK Athens (Greece) | 3–1 | (Austria) Red Bull Salzburg | 3–0 | 0–1 |
| 1. FC Nürnberg (Germany) | 2–2 (a) | (Romania) Rapid București | 0–0 | 2–2 |
| Everton (England) | 4–3 | (Ukraine) Metalist Kharkiv | 1–1 | 3–2 |
| Zenit Saint Petersburg (Russia) | 4–1 | (Belgium) Standard Liège | 3–0 | 1–1 |
| Bayer Leverkusen (Germany) | 5–4 | (Portugal) União de Leiria | 3–1 | 2–3 |
| Villarreal (Spain) | 6–1 | (Belarus) BATE Borisov | 4–1 | 2–0 |
| Sion (Switzerland) | 4–7 | (Turkey) Galatasaray | 3–2 | 1–5 |
| Atlético Madrid (Spain) | 9–0 | (Turkey) Kayseri Erciyesspor | 4–0 | 5–0 |
| Tampere United (Finland) | 3–4 | (France) Bordeaux | 2–3 | 1–1 |
| Artmedia Petržalka (Slovakia) | 1–5 | (Greece) Panathinaikos | 1–2 | 0–3 |
| Sparta Prague (Czech Republic) | 0–0 (4–3 p) | (Denmark) Odense | 0–0 | 0–0 (a.e.t.) |
| Empoli (Italy) | 2–4 | (Switzerland) Zürich | 2–1 | 0–3 |
| Sochaux (France) | 1–2 | (Greece) Panionios | 0–2 | 1–0 |
| Anderlecht (Belgium) | 2–1 | (Austria) Rapid Wien | 1–1 | 1–0 |
| Paços de Ferreira (Portugal) | 0–1 | (Netherlands) AZ | 0–1 | 0–0 |
| Sampdoria (Italy) | 2–2 (a) | (Denmark) AaB | 2–2 | 0–0 |
| Spartak Moscow (Russia) | 8–1 | (Sweden) BK Häcken | 5–0 | 3–1 |
| Hammarby IF (Sweden) | 2–5 | (Portugal) Braga | 2–1 | 0–4 |
| AEL (Greece) | 3–2 | (England) Blackburn Rovers | 2–0 | 1–2 |
| Mladá Boleslav (Czech Republic) | 1–1 (4–2 p) | (Italy) Palermo | 0–1 | 1–0 (a.e.t.) |
| Dinamo Zagreb (Croatia) | 3–3 (a) | (Netherlands) Ajax | 0–1 | 3–2 (a.e.t.) |
| Lokomotiv Sofia (Bulgaria) | 3–4 | (France) Rennes | 1–3 | 2–1 |
| Brann (Norway) | 2–2 (a) | (Belgium) Club Brugge | 0–1 | 2–1 |
| Bayern Munich (Germany) | 3–0 | (Portugal) Belenenses | 1–0 | 2–0 |
| Aberdeen (Scotland) | 1–1 (a) | (Ukraine) Dnipro Dnipropetrovsk | 0–0 | 1–1 |
| Heerenveen (Netherlands) | 6–8 | (Sweden) Helsingborgs IF | 5–3 | 1–5 |
| Toulouse (France) | 1–1 (a) | (Bulgaria) CSKA Sofia | 0–0 | 1–1 |
| Litex Lovech (Bulgaria) | 1–4 | (Germany) Hamburger SV | 0–1 | 1–3 |
| Sarajevo (Bosnia and Herzegovina) | 1–8 | (Switzerland) Basel | 1–2 | 0–6 |
| Austria Wien | 4–2 | (Norway) Vålerenga | 2–0 | 2–2 |
| Hapoel Tel Aviv (Israel) | 1–0 | (Sweden) AIK | 0–0 | 1–0 |
| Aris (Greece) | 2–2 (a) | (Spain) Zaragoza | 1–0 | 1–2 |
| Dinamo București (Romania) | 2–2 (a) | (Sweden) IF Elfsborg | 1–2 | 1–0 |
| Tottenham Hotspur (England) | 7–2 | (Cyprus) Anorthosis Famagusta | 6–1 | 1–1 |
| Lens (France) | 2–3 | (Denmark) Copenhagen | 1–1 | 1–2 (a.e.t.) |
| Getafe (Spain) | 3–3 (a) | (Netherlands) Twente | 1–0 | 2–3 (a.e.t.) |
| Groclin Grodzisk Wielkopolski (Poland) | 0–2 | (Serbia) Crvena zvezda | 0–1 | 0–1 |

== Group stage ==
Teams that have qualified for the group stage of the 2007–08 UEFA Cup
Red: Group A; Yellow: Group B; Green: Group C; Black: Group D;
Purple: Group E; Pink: Group F; Blue: Group G; Orange: Group H.

The draw, which was conducted by UEFA's director of professional football Giorgio Marchetti and Michele Centenaro, UEFA's head of club competitions, was held on Tuesday, 9 October 2007 at 12:00 CET in Nyon, Switzerland.

The top three teams (highlighted in green) of each group qualified for the next round. Based on paragraph 6.06 in the UEFA regulations for the current season, if two or more teams were equal on points on completion of all the group matches, the following criteria were applied to determine the rankings:

1. superior goal difference from all group matches played;
2. higher number of goals scored in all group matches played;
3. higher number of goals scored away in all group matches played;
4. higher number of wins;
5. higher number of away wins;
6. higher number of coefficient points accumulated by the club in question, as well as its association, over the previous five seasons (see paragraph 8.03 of the UEFA regulations).

=== Group A ===
| Pos | Team | Pld | W | D | L | GF | GA | GD | Pts | Qualification | EVE | NÜR | ZEN | AZ | AEL |
|---|---|---|---|---|---|---|---|---|---|---|---|---|---|---|---|
| 1 | (England) Everton | 4 | 4 | 0 | 0 | 9 | 3 | +6 | 12 | Advance to knockout stage | — | — | 1–0 | — | 3–1 |
| 2 | (Germany) 1. FC Nürnberg | 4 | 2 | 1 | 1 | 7 | 6 | +1 | 7 | Advance to knockout stage | 0–2 | — | — | 2–1 | — |
| 3 | (Russia) Zenit Saint Petersburg | 4 | 1 | 2 | 1 | 6 | 6 | 0 | 5 | Advance to knockout stage | — | 2–2 | — | 1–1 | — |
| 4 | (Netherlands) AZ | 4 | 1 | 1 | 2 | 5 | 6 | −1 | 4 | | 2–3 | — | — | — | 1–0 |
| 5 | (Greece) AEL Larissa | 4 | 0 | 0 | 4 | 4 | 10 | −6 | 0 | | — | 1–3 | 2–3 | — | — |

=== Group B ===
| Pos | Team | Pld | W | D | L | GF | GA | GD | Pts | Qualification | ATL | PAN | ABE | FCK | LOK |
|---|---|---|---|---|---|---|---|---|---|---|---|---|---|---|---|
| 1 | (Spain) Atlético Madrid | 4 | 3 | 1 | 0 | 9 | 4 | +5 | 10 | Advance to knockout stage | — | 2–1 | 2–0 | — | — |
| 2 | (Greece) Panathinaikos | 4 | 3 | 0 | 1 | 7 | 2 | +5 | 9 | Advance to knockout stage | — | — | 3–0 | — | 2–0 |
| 3 | (Scotland) Aberdeen | 4 | 1 | 1 | 2 | 5 | 6 | −1 | 4 | Advance to knockout stage | — | — | — | 4–0 | 1–1 |
| 4 | (Denmark) Copenhagen | 4 | 1 | 0 | 3 | 1 | 7 | −6 | 3 | | 0–2 | 0–1 | — | — | — |
| 5 | (Russia) Lokomotiv Moscow | 4 | 0 | 2 | 2 | 4 | 7 | −3 | 2 | | 3–3 | — | — | 0–1 | — |

=== Group C ===
| Pos | Team | Pld | W | D | L | GF | GA | GD | Pts | Qualification | VIL | FIO | AEK | MLA | ELF |
|---|---|---|---|---|---|---|---|---|---|---|---|---|---|---|---|
| 1 | (Spain) Villarreal | 4 | 3 | 1 | 0 | 7 | 3 | +4 | 10 | Advance to knockout stage | — | 1–1 | — | — | 2–0 |
| 2 | (Italy) Fiorentina | 4 | 2 | 2 | 0 | 10 | 4 | +6 | 8 | Advance to knockout stage | — | — | — | 2–1 | 6–1 |
| 3 | (Greece) AEK Athens | 4 | 1 | 2 | 1 | 4 | 4 | 0 | 5 | Advance to knockout stage | 1–2 | 1–1 | — | — | — |
| 4 | (Czech Republic) Mladá Boleslav | 4 | 1 | 0 | 3 | 5 | 6 | −1 | 3 | | 1–2 | — | 0–1 | — | — |
| 5 | (Sweden) IF Elfsborg | 4 | 0 | 1 | 3 | 3 | 12 | −9 | 1 | | — | — | 1–1 | 1–3 | — |

=== Group D ===
| Pos | Team | Pld | W | D | L | GF | GA | GD | Pts | Qualification | HSV | BAS | BRA | DZ | REN |
|---|---|---|---|---|---|---|---|---|---|---|---|---|---|---|---|
| 1 | (Germany) Hamburger SV | 4 | 3 | 1 | 0 | 7 | 1 | +6 | 10 | Advance to knockout stage | — | 1–1 | — | — | 3–0 |
| 2 | (Switzerland) Basel | 4 | 2 | 2 | 0 | 3 | 1 | +2 | 8 | Advance to knockout stage | — | — | 1–0 | — | 1–0 |
| 3 | (Norway) Brann | 4 | 1 | 1 | 2 | 3 | 4 | −1 | 4 | Advance to knockout stage | 0–1 | — | — | 2–1 | — |
| 4 | (Croatia) Dinamo Zagreb | 4 | 0 | 2 | 2 | 2 | 5 | −3 | 2 | | 0–2 | 0–0 | — | — | — |
| 5 | (France) Rennes | 4 | 0 | 2 | 2 | 2 | 6 | −4 | 2 | | — | — | 1–1 | 1–1 | — |

=== Group E ===
| Pos | Team | Pld | W | D | L | GF | GA | GD | Pts | Qualification | LEV | SPM | ZÜR | PRA | TOU |
|---|---|---|---|---|---|---|---|---|---|---|---|---|---|---|---|
| 1 | (Germany) Bayer Leverkusen | 4 | 3 | 0 | 1 | 8 | 2 | +6 | 9 | Advance to knockout stage | — | — | — | 1–0 | 1–0 |
| 2 | (Russia) Spartak Moscow | 4 | 2 | 1 | 1 | 4 | 3 | +1 | 7 | Advance to knockout stage | 2–1 | — | 1–0 | — | — |
| 3 | (Switzerland) Zürich | 4 | 2 | 0 | 2 | 4 | 7 | −3 | 6 | Advance to knockout stage | 0–5 | — | — | — | 2–0 |
| 4 | (Czech Republic) Sparta Prague | 4 | 1 | 1 | 2 | 4 | 5 | −1 | 4 | | — | 0–0 | 1–2 | — | — |
| 5 | (France) Toulouse | 4 | 1 | 0 | 3 | 4 | 7 | −3 | 3 | | — | 2–1 | — | 2–3 | — |

=== Group F ===
| Pos | Team | Pld | W | D | L | GF | GA | GD | Pts | Qualification | BAY | BRA | BOL | ARI | RSB |
|---|---|---|---|---|---|---|---|---|---|---|---|---|---|---|---|
| 1 | (Germany) Bayern Munich | 4 | 2 | 2 | 0 | 12 | 5 | +7 | 8 | Advance to knockout stage | — | — | 2–2 | 6–0 | — |
| 2 | (Portugal) Braga | 4 | 1 | 3 | 0 | 5 | 3 | +2 | 6 | Advance to knockout stage | 1–1 | — | — | — | 2–0 |
| 3 | (England) Bolton Wanderers | 4 | 1 | 3 | 0 | 5 | 4 | +1 | 6 | Advance to knockout stage | — | 1–1 | — | 1–1 | — |
| 4 | (Greece) Aris | 4 | 1 | 2 | 1 | 5 | 8 | −3 | 5 | | — | 1–1 | — | — | 3–0 |
| 5 | (Serbia) Red Star Belgrade | 4 | 0 | 0 | 4 | 2 | 9 | −7 | 0 | | 2–3 | — | 0–1 | — | — |

=== Group G ===
| Pos | Team | Pld | W | D | L | GF | GA | GD | Pts | Qualification | GET | TOT | AND | AAB | HTA |
|---|---|---|---|---|---|---|---|---|---|---|---|---|---|---|---|
| 1 | (Spain) Getafe | 4 | 3 | 0 | 1 | 7 | 5 | +2 | 9 | Advance to knockout stage | — | — | 2–1 | — | 1–2 |
| 2 | (England) Tottenham Hotspur | 4 | 2 | 1 | 1 | 7 | 5 | +2 | 7 | Advance to knockout stage | 1–2 | — | — | 3–2 | — |
| 3 | (Belgium) Anderlecht | 4 | 1 | 2 | 1 | 5 | 4 | +1 | 5 | Advance to knockout stage | — | 1–1 | — | — | 2–0 |
| 4 | (Denmark) AaB | 4 | 1 | 1 | 2 | 7 | 7 | 0 | 4 | | 1–2 | — | 1–1 | — | — |
| 5 | (Israel) Hapoel Tel Aviv | 4 | 1 | 0 | 3 | 3 | 8 | −5 | 3 | | — | 0–2 | — | 1–3 | — |

=== Group H ===
| Pos | Team | Pld | W | D | L | GF | GA | GD | Pts | Qualification | BDX | HEL | GAL | PAN | AUS |
|---|---|---|---|---|---|---|---|---|---|---|---|---|---|---|---|
| 1 | (France) Bordeaux | 4 | 4 | 0 | 0 | 9 | 5 | +4 | 12 | Advance to knockout stage | — | 2–1 | 2–1 | — | — |
| 2 | (Sweden) Helsingborgs IF | 4 | 2 | 1 | 1 | 8 | 5 | +3 | 7 | Advance to knockout stage | — | — | — | 1–1 | 3–0 |
| 3 | (Turkey) Galatasaray | 4 | 1 | 1 | 2 | 6 | 5 | +1 | 4 | Advance to knockout stage | — | 2–3 | — | — | 0–0 |
| 4 | (Greece) Panionios | 4 | 1 | 1 | 2 | 4 | 7 | −3 | 4 | | 2–3 | — | 0–3 | — | — |
| 5 | Austria Wien | 4 | 0 | 1 | 3 | 1 | 6 | −5 | 1 | | 1–2 | — | — | 0–1 | — |

== Knockout stage ==
All of the rounds in the final phase are two-legged, except for the final. In the event of aggregate scores being equal after normal time in the second leg, the winning team will be that which scored more goals on their away leg: if the scores in the two matches were identical, extra time is played. The away goals rule also applies if scores are equal at the end of extra time. If there are no goals scored in extra time, the tie is decided on a penalty shoot out. The team first out of the hat in each tie plays the first leg of their tie at home, and the second leg away.

=== Bracket ===
Round of 32
(Belgium) Anderlecht | 2 | 1 | 3
(France) Bordeaux | 1 | 1 | 2
(Scotland) Aberdeen | 2 | 1 | 3
(Germany) Bayern Munich | 2 | 5 | 7
(Portugal) Benfica | 1 | 2 | 3
(Germany) 1. FC Nürnberg | 0 | 2 | 2
(Greece) AEK Athens | 1 | 0 | 1
(Spain) Getafe | 1 | 3 | 4
(Turkey) Galatasaray | 0 | 1 | 1
(Germany) Bayer Leverkusen | 0 | 5 | 5
(Switzerland) Zürich | 1 | 0 | 1
(Germany) Hamburger SV | 3 | 0 | 3
(France) Marseille | 3 | 0 | 3
(Russia) Spartak Moscow | 0 | 2 | 2
(Russia) Zenit Saint Petersburg (a) | 1 | 1 | 2
(Spain) Villarreal | 0 | 2 | 2
(Scotland) Rangers (a) | 0 | 1 | 1
(Greece) Panathinaikos | 0 | 1 | 1
(Germany) Werder Bremen | 3 | 1 | 4
(Portugal) Braga | 0 | 0 | 0
(England) Bolton Wanderers | 1 | 0 | 1
(Spain) Atlético Madrid | 0 | 0 | 0
(Portugal) Sporting CP | 2 | 3 | 5
(Switzerland) Basel | 0 | 0 | 0
(Norway) Rosenborg | 0 | 1 | 1
(Italy) Fiorentina | 1 | 2 | 3
(Norway) Brann | 0 | 1 | 1
(England) Everton | 2 | 6 | 8
(Czech Republic) Slavia Prague | 1 | 1 | 2
(England) Tottenham Hotspur | 2 | 1 | 3
(Netherlands) PSV Eindhoven | 2 | 2 | 4
(Sweden) Helsingborgs IF | 0 | 1 | 1

Round of 16
(Belgium) Anderlecht | 0 | 2 | 2
(Germany) Bayern Munich | 5 | 1 | 6
(Portugal) Benfica | 1 | 0 | 1
(Spain) Getafe | 2 | 1 | 3
(Germany) Bayer Leverkusen (a) | 1 | 2 | 3
(Germany) Hamburger SV | 0 | 3 | 3
(France) Marseille | 3 | 0 | 3
(Russia) Zenit Saint Petersburg (a) | 1 | 2 | 3
(Scotland) Rangers | 2 | 0 | 2
(Germany) Werder Bremen | 0 | 1 | 1
(England) Bolton Wanderers | 1 | 0 | 1
(Portugal) Sporting CP | 1 | 1 | 2
(Italy) Fiorentina (p) | 2 | 0 | 2 (4)
(England) Everton | 0 | 2 | 2 (2)
(England) Tottenham Hotspur | 0 | 1 | 1 (5)
(Netherlands) PSV Eindhoven (p) | 1 | 0 | 1 (6)

Quarter-finals
(Germany) Bayern Munich (a.e.t.; a) | 1 | 3 | 4
(Spain) Getafe | 1 | 3 | 4
(Germany) Bayer Leverkusen | 1 | 1 | 2
(Russia) Zenit Saint Petersburg | 4 | 0 | 4
(Scotland) Rangers | 0 | 2 | 2
(Portugal) Sporting CP | 0 | 0 | 0
(Italy) Fiorentina | 1 | 2 | 3
(Netherlands) PSV Eindhoven | 1 | 0 | 1

Semi-finals
(Germany) Bayern Munich | 1 | 0 | 1
(Russia) Zenit Saint Petersburg | 1 | 4 | 5
(Scotland) Rangers (p) | 0 | 0 | 0 (4)
(Italy) Fiorentina | 0 | 0 | 0 (2)

Final
14 May – Manchester
(Russia) Zenit Saint Petersburg | 2
(Scotland) Rangers | 0

=== Round of 32 ===
The draw for the round of 32, which was conducted by UEFA General Secretary David Taylor and Michele Centenaro, UEFA's head of club competitions, was held on Friday, 21 December 2007 at 13:00 CET in Nyon, Switzerland. The eight group winners were drawn against the eight third-placed teams, while the eight second-placed teams were drawn against the eight teams who finished third in the Champions League groups. Teams from the same group or the same country cannot be drawn together. The first legs were played on 13 and 14 February 2008. The second legs were played on 21 February 2008.

| Team 1 | Agg. | Team 2 | 1st leg | 2nd leg |
|---|---|---|---|---|
| Aberdeen (Scotland) | 3–7 | (Germany) Bayern Munich | 2–2 | 1–5 |
| AEK Athens (Greece) | 1–4 | (Spain) Getafe | 1–1 | 0–3 |
| Bolton Wanderers (England) | 1–0 | (Spain) Atlético Madrid | 1–0 | 0–0 |
| Zenit Saint Petersburg (Russia) | 2–2 (a) | (Spain) Villarreal | 1–0 | 1–2 |
| Galatasaray (Turkey) | 1–5 | (Germany) Bayer Leverkusen | 0–0 | 1–5 |
| Anderlecht (Belgium) | 3–2 | (France) Bordeaux | 2–1 | 1–1 |
| Brann (Norway) | 1–8 | (England) Everton | 0–2 | 1–6 |
| Zürich (Switzerland) | 1–3 | (Germany) Hamburger SV | 1–3 | 0–0 |
| Rangers (Scotland) | 1–1 (a) | (Greece) Panathinaikos | 0–0 | 1–1 |
| PSV Eindhoven (Netherlands) | 4–1 | (Sweden) Helsingborgs IF | 2–0 | 2–1 |
| Slavia Prague (Czech Republic) | 2–3 | (England) Tottenham Hotspur | 1–2 | 1–1 |
| Rosenborg (Norway) | 1–3 | (Italy) Fiorentina | 0–1 | 1–2 |
| Sporting CP (Portugal) | 5–0 | (Switzerland) Basel | 2–0 | 3–0 |
| Werder Bremen (Germany) | 4–0 | (Portugal) Braga | 3–0 | 1–0 |
| Benfica (Portugal) | 3–2 | (Germany) 1. FC Nürnberg | 1–0 | 2–2 |
| Marseille (France) | 3–2 | (Russia) Spartak Moscow | 3–0 | 0–2 |

=== Round of 16 ===
The draw for the round of 16, which was conducted by UEFA General Secretary David Taylor, was also held on Friday, 21 December 2007 at 13:00 CET in Nyon, Switzerland. Unlike the previous rounds, teams from the same group or country may be drawn together from the round of 16 onwards. The first legs were played on 6 March 2008. The second legs were played on 12 and 13 March 2008.

| Team 1 | Agg. | Team 2 | 1st leg | 2nd leg |
|---|---|---|---|---|
| Anderlecht (Belgium) | 2–6 | (Germany) Bayern Munich | 0–5 | 2–1 |
| Rangers (Scotland) | 2–1 | (Germany) Werder Bremen | 2–0 | 0–1 |
| Bolton Wanderers (England) | 1–2 | (Portugal) Sporting CP | 1–1 | 0–1 |
| Bayer Leverkusen (Germany) | 3–3 (a) | (Germany) Hamburger SV | 1–0 | 2–3 |
| Benfica (Portugal) | 1–3 | (Spain) Getafe | 1–2 | 0–1 |
| Fiorentina (Italy) | 2–2 (4–2 p) | (England) Everton | 2–0 | 0–2 (a.e.t.) |
| Tottenham Hotspur (England) | 1–1 (5–6 p) | (Netherlands) PSV Eindhoven | 0–1 | 1–0 (a.e.t.) |
| Marseille (France) | 3–3 (a) | (Russia) Zenit Saint Petersburg | 3–1 | 0–2 |

=== Quarter-finals ===
The draw for the quarter-finals, semi-finals and final, which was conducted by UEFA General Secretary David Taylor and Denis Law, the ambassador for the final in Manchester, was held on Friday, 14 March 2008 at 14:00 CET in Nyon, Switzerland. The first legs were played on 3 April and the second legs were played on 10 April 2008.

| Team 1 | Agg. | Team 2 | 1st leg | 2nd leg |
|---|---|---|---|---|
| Bayer Leverkusen (Germany) | 2–4 | (Russia) Zenit Saint Petersburg | 1–4 | 1–0 |
| Rangers (Scotland) | 2–0 | (Portugal) Sporting CP | 0–0 | 2–0 |
| Bayern Munich (Germany) | 4–4 (a) | (Spain) Getafe | 1–1 | 3–3 (a.e.t.) |
| Fiorentina (Italy) | 3–1 | (Netherlands) PSV Eindhoven | 1–1 | 2–0 |

=== Semi-finals ===
The semi-final matches were played on 24 April and 1 May 2008.

| Team 1 | Agg. | Team 2 | 1st leg | 2nd leg |
|---|---|---|---|---|
| Bayern Munich (Germany) | 1–5 | (Russia) Zenit Saint Petersburg | 1–1 | 0–4 |
| Rangers (Scotland) | 0–0 (4–2 p) | (Italy) Fiorentina | 0–0 | 0–0 (a.e.t.) |

=== Final ===
The final took place on 14 May 2008 at the City of Manchester Stadium in Manchester, England.

14 May 2008
19:45 UTC+1

| Zenit Saint Petersburg (Russia) | 2–0 | (Scotland) Rangers |
|---|---|---|
| Denisov 72'; Zyryanov 90+4' | Report |

City of Manchester Stadium, Manchester
Attendance: 43,878
Referee: Peter Fröjdfeldt (Sweden)

== Top goalscorers ==
The top scorers in the 2007–08 UEFA Cup are the following:

| Rank | Name | Team | Goals | Appearances |
|---|---|---|---|---|
| 1 | (Russia) Pavel Pogrebnyak | (Russia) Zenit Saint Petersburg | 10 | 13 |
| 1 | (Italy) Luca Toni | (Germany) Bayern Munich | 10 | 11 |
| 3 | (Germany) Stefan Kießling | (Germany) Bayer Leverkusen | 7 | 12 |
| 4 | (Romania) Adrian Mutu | (Italy) Fiorentina | 6 | 10 |
| 4 | (Sweden) Henrik Larsson | (Sweden) Helsingborgs IF | 6 | 8 |
| 4 | (Benin) Razak Omotoyossi | (Sweden) Helsingborgs IF | 6 | 8 |
| 7 | (Argentina) Sergio Agüero | (Spain) Atlético Madrid | 5 | 7 |
| 7 | (Bulgaria) Dimitar Berbatov | (England) Tottenham Hotspur | 5 | 8 |
| 7 | (Argentina) Fernando Cavenaghi | (France) Bordeaux | 5 | 7 |
| 7 | (Germany) Miroslav Klose | (Germany) Bayern Munich | 5 | 12 |
| 7 | (Austria) Roland Linz | (Portugal) Braga | 5 | 8 |
| 7 | (Greece) Dimitrios Papadopoulos | (Greece) Panathinaikos | 5 | 7 |
| 7 | (Germany) Lukas Podolski | (Germany) Bayern Munich | 5 | 12 |
| 7 | (Denmark) Jon Dahl Tomasson | (Spain) Villarreal | 5 | 8 |

== See also ==
- 2007–08 UEFA Champions League
- 2007 UEFA Intertoto Cup
- 2008 UEFA Super Cup
