= Tomáš Sedláček (footballer) =

Czech footballer

Personal information
- Date of birth: 29 August 1980 (age 46)
- Place of birth: Czechoslovakia
- Height: 1.84 m (6 ft 0 in)
- Position: Forward

Senior career*
| Years | Team | Apps | (Gls) |
| 2001–2008 | Mladá Boleslav | 84 | (9) |
| 2002 | → Kolín (loan) | | |
| 2008–2011 | České Budějovice | 59 | (10) |
| 2011 | → Čáslav (loan) | 14 | (6) |
| 2011–2012 | FC Vysočina Jihlava | 40 | (7) |
- * Club domestic league appearances and goals

Tomáš Sedláček (born 29 August 1980) is a Czech former professional footballer who played as a forward.
