= 2008–09 UEFA Cup first round =

The first round of the 2008–09 UEFA Cup was played from 16 September to 2 October 2008, which narrowed clubs down to 40 teams in preparation for the group stage.

Times are CEST (UTC+2), as listed by UEFA.

== Teams ==
32 teams entered the tournament at the first round, along with the 32 winners from the previous round and the 16 losers from the Champions League third qualifying round.

Key to colours
Winners of first round advanced to group stage

First round participants

Team	Notes	Coeff.
(Italy) Milan		119.934
(Spain) Sevilla		102.837
(Spain) Valencia		83.837
(Portugal) Benfica		77.176
(Germany) Schalke 04		67.078
(Russia) CSKA Moscow		59.437
(England) Tottenham Hotspur		55.996
(Germany) Hamburger SV		52.078
(Germany) VfB Stuttgart		52.078
(Netherlands) Ajax		51.610
(Greece) Olympiacos		51.525
(Spain) Deportivo La Coruña		46.837
(England) Everton		43.996
(Belgium) Club Brugge		41.810
(Romania) Rapid București		41.398
(Turkey) Beşiktaş		40.469
(Russia) Spartak Moscow		40.437
(France) Paris Saint-Germain		37.380
(Czech Republic) Sparta Prague		36.496
(Romania) Dinamo București		36.398

Team	Notes	Coeff.
(Netherlands) Heerenveen		35.610
(Norway) Rosenborg		35.400
(Italy) Udinese		34.934
(Netherlands) Feyenoord		33.610
(Portugal) Braga		33.176
(Bulgaria) Levski Sofia		32.644
Austria Wien		31.840
(Czech Republic) Slavia Prague		31.496
(England) Manchester City		30.996
(Turkey) Galatasaray		30.469
(Italy) Sampdoria		28.934
(Germany) Hertha BSC		27.078
(Serbia) Partizan		25.527
(France) Nancy		25.380
(England) Aston Villa		24.996
(England) Portsmouth		24.996
(Spain) Racing Santander		24.837
(France) Rennes		24.380
(Denmark) Copenhagen		23.748
(Israel) Hapoel Tel Aviv		21.197

Team	Notes	Coeff.
(Germany) Borussia Dortmund		21.078
(Italy) Napoli		19.934
(Denmark) Brøndby		18.748
(Bulgaria) Litex Lovech		18.644
(Portugal) Vitória de Guimarães		18.176
(Croatia) Dinamo Zagreb		17.836
(France) Saint-Étienne		17.380
(Switzerland) Zürich		16.993
(Germany) VfL Wolfsburg		16.078
(Poland) Wisła Kraków		15.973
(Portugal) Vitória de Setúbal		15.176
(Portugal) Marítimo		15.176
(Belgium) Standard Liège		14.810
(Netherlands) Twente		14.610
(Russia) FC Moscow		14.437
(Slovakia) Artmedia Petržalka		14.070
(Romania) Unirea Urziceni		13.398
(Romania) Vaslui		13.398
(Romania) Timișoara		13.398
(Netherlands) NEC		12.610

Team	Notes	Coeff.
(Norway) Brann		12.400
(Czech Republic) Baník Ostrava		11.496
(Turkey) Kayserispor		11.469
(Scotland) Motherwell		11.013
(Ukraine) Metalist Kharkiv		10.932
(Austria) Red Bull Salzburg		10.840
(Switzerland) Young Boys		7.993
(Switzerland) Bellinzona		7.993
(Bulgaria) Cherno More		7.644
(Poland) Lech Poznań		6.973
(Denmark) Nordsjælland		6.748
(Serbia) Borac Čačak		5.527
(Sweden) Kalmar FF		4.518
(Slovakia) Žilina		4.070
(Croatia) Slaven Belupo		3.836
(Cyprus) APOEL		3.327
(Cyprus) Omonia		3.327
(Finland) Honka		3.176
(Lithuania) Kaunas		2.640
(Republic of Ireland) St Patrick's Athletic		2.420

Notes

1. ^{Q2} Winners from the second qualifying round
2. ^{CL} Losers from the Champions League third qualifying round

== Seeding ==
The 80 teams were split into eight groups of ten teams; five seeded teams and five unseeded teams. The draw was based on their coefficient ranking with one exception: no country can have multiple teams in any group. Teams ranked 108 or higher were seeded, as were unranked teams from England and Spain. The draw, which was conducted by UEFA General Secretary David Taylor, was held on 29 August 2008 at 13:00 CET in Monaco.

Group 1		Group 2		Group 3		Group 4	
Seeded	Unseeded	Seeded	Unseeded	Seeded	Unseeded	Seeded	Unseeded
(Italy) Milan; (Turkey) Beşiktaş; (Russia) Spartak Moscow; (Germany) Hertha BSC; (Serbia) Partizan	(Switzerland) Zürich; (Romania) Timișoara; (Czech Republic) Baník Ostrava; (Ukraine) Metalist Kharkiv; (Republic of Ireland) St Patrick's Athletic	(Spain) Sevilla; (Romania) Rapid București; (France) Paris Saint-Germain; (Italy) Sampdoria; (England) Portsmouth	(Portugal) Vitória de Guimarães; (Germany) VfL Wolfsburg; (Turkey) Kayserispor; (Austria) Red Bull Salzburg; (Lithuania) Kaunas	(Spain) Valencia; (Belgium) Club Brugge; (Czech Republic) Sparta Prague; (England) Manchester City; (France) Nancy	(Croatia) Dinamo Zagreb; (Portugal) Marítimo; (Scotland) Motherwell; (Switzerland) Young Boys; (Cyprus) Omonia	(Portugal) Benfica; (England) Everton; (Romania) Dinamo București; (Turkey) Galatasaray; (Spain) Racing Santander	(Italy) Napoli; (Belgium) Standard Liège; (Netherlands) NEC; (Switzerland) Bellinzona; (Finland) Honka
Group 5		Group 6		Group 7		Group 8	
Seeded	Unseeded	Seeded	Unseeded	Seeded	Unseeded	Seeded	Unseeded
(Germany) Schalke 04; (Spain) Deportivo La Coruña; (Netherlands) Heerenveen; Austria Wien; (England) Aston Villa	(Bulgaria) Litex Lovech; (Portugal) Vitória de Setúbal; (Norway) Brann; (Poland) Lech Poznań; (Cyprus) APOEL	(Russia) CSKA Moscow; (Germany) VfB Stuttgart; (Norway) Rosenborg; (Czech Republic) Slavia Prague; (France) Rennes	(Denmark) Brøndby; (Netherlands) Twente; (Romania) Vaslui; (Bulgaria) Cherno More; (Croatia) Slaven Belupo	(England) Tottenham Hotspur; (Netherlands) Ajax; (Italy) Udinese; (Bulgaria) Levski Sofia; (Denmark) Copenhagen	(Germany) Borussia Dortmund; (Poland) Wisła Kraków; (Russia) FC Moscow; (Serbia) Borac Čačak; (Slovakia) Žilina	(Germany) Hamburger SV; (Greece) Olympiacos; (Netherlands) Feyenoord; (Portugal) Braga; (Israel) Hapoel Tel Aviv	(France) Saint-Étienne; (Slovakia) Artmedia Petržalka; (Romania) Unirea Urziceni; (Denmark) Nordsjælland; (Sweden) Kalmar FF

== Summary ==
The matches were played on 18 September and 2 October 2008.

Nine of the 40 ties were won by the unseeded team. The nine seeded losing teams, with their ranking, were: Everton (50), Rapid București (58), Beşiktaş (60), Sparta Prague (68), Dinamo București (69), Levski Sofia (80), Austria Wien (82), Rennes (97) and Hapoel Tel Aviv (108).

Team 1	Agg.	Team 2	1st leg	2nd leg
Milan (Italy)	4–1	(Switzerland) Zürich	3–1	1–0
Timișoara (Romania)	1–3	(Serbia) Partizan	1–2	0–1
Hertha BSC (Germany)	2–0	(Republic of Ireland) St Patrick's Athletic	2–0	0–0
Baník Ostrava (Czech Republic)	1–2	(Russia) Spartak Moscow	0–1	1–1
Beşiktaş (Turkey)	2–4 (Note: Order of legs reversed)	(Ukraine) Metalist Kharkiv	1–0	1–4
Portsmouth (England)	4–2	(Portugal) Vitória de Guimarães	2–0	2–2 (a.e.t.)
Kayserispor (Turkey)	1–2	(France) Paris Saint-Germain	1–2	0–0
Sevilla (Spain)	4–0	(Austria) Red Bull Salzburg	2–0	2–0
VfL Wolfsburg (Germany)	2–1	(Romania) Rapid București	1–0	1–1
Sampdoria (Italy)	7–1	(Lithuania) Kaunas	5–0	2–1
Marítimo (Portugal)	1–3	(Spain) Valencia	0–1	1–2
Dinamo Zagreb (Croatia)	3–3 (a)	(Czech Republic) Sparta Prague	0–0	3–3
Omonia (Cyprus)	2–4	(England) Manchester City	1–2	1–2
Young Boys (Switzerland)	2–4	(Belgium) Club Brugge	2–2	0–2
Nancy (France)	3–0	(Scotland) Motherwell	1–0	2–0
Everton (England)	3–4	(Belgium) Standard Liège	2–2	1–2
Napoli (Italy)	3–4	(Portugal) Benfica	3–2	0–2
Bellinzona (Switzerland)	4–6	(Turkey) Galatasaray	3–4	1–2
NEC (Netherlands)	1–0	(Romania) Dinamo București	1–0	0–0
Racing Santander (Spain)	2–0	(Finland) Honka	1–0	1–0
APOEL (Cyprus)	2–5	(Germany) Schalke 04	1–4	1–1
Litex Lovech (Bulgaria)	2–4	(England) Aston Villa	1–3	1–1
Austria Wien	4–5	(Poland) Lech Poznań	2–1	2–4 (a.e.t.)
Vitória de Setúbal (Portugal)	3–6	(Netherlands) Heerenveen	1–1	2–5
Brann (Norway)	2–2 (2–3 p)	(Spain) Deportivo La Coruña	2–0	0–2 (a.e.t.)
Slavia Prague (Czech Republic)	1–1 (a)	(Romania) Vaslui	0–0	1–1
Slaven Belupo (Croatia)	1–3	(Russia) CSKA Moscow	1–2	0–1
Brøndby (Denmark)	3–5	(Norway) Rosenborg	1–2	2–3
Cherno More (Bulgaria)	3–4	(Germany) VfB Stuttgart	1–2	2–2
Rennes (France)	2–2 (a)	(Netherlands) Twente	2–1	0–1
Borac Čačak (Serbia)	1–6	(Netherlands) Ajax	1–4	0–2
Tottenham Hotspur (England)	3–2	(Poland) Wisła Kraków	2–1	1–1
FC Moscow (Russia)	2–3	(Denmark) Copenhagen	1–2	1–1
Žilina (Slovakia)	2–1	(Bulgaria) Levski Sofia	1–1	1–0
Borussia Dortmund (Germany)	2–2 (3–4 p)	(Italy) Udinese	0–2	2–0 (a.e.t.)
Braga (Portugal)	6–0	(Slovakia) Artmedia Petržalka	4–0	2–0
Feyenoord (Netherlands)	2–2 (a)	(Sweden) Kalmar FF	0–1	2–1
Hamburger SV (Germany)	2–0	(Romania) Unirea Urziceni	0–0	2–0
Hapoel Tel Aviv (Israel)	2–4	(France) Saint-Étienne	1–2	1–2
Nordsjælland (Denmark)	0–7	(Greece) Olympiacos	0–2	0–5

== Matches ==
18 September 2008
20:45

Milan (Italy)	3–1	(Switzerland) Zürich
Stahel 45+1' (o.g.); Pato 57'; Borriello 74'	Report	Djuric 78'

San Siro, Milan
Attendance: 25,000
Referee: Eduardo Iturralde González (Spain)
2 October 2008
20:15

Zürich (Switzerland)	0–1	(Italy) Milan
	Report	Shevchenko 70'

Letzigrund, Zürich
Attendance: 24,600
Referee: Damir Skomina (Slovenia)

Milan won 4–1 on aggregate.

18 September 2008
19:45

Timișoara (Romania)	1–2	(Serbia) Partizan
Bucur 25'	Report	Tošić 35'; Bogunović 69'

Stadionul Dan Păltinișanu, Timișoara
Attendance: 19,000
Referee: Zsolt Szabó (Hungary)
2 October 2008
19:00

Partizan (Serbia)	1–0	(Romania) Timișoara
Stevanović 70'	Report

Partizan Stadium, Belgrade
Attendance: 15,625
Referee: Bruno Paixão (Portugal)

Partizan won 3–1 on aggregate.

16 September 2008
18:00

Hertha BSC (Germany)	2–0	(Republic of Ireland) St Patrick's Athletic
Nicu 50'; Cícero 77'	Report

Olympic Stadium, Berlin
Attendance: 13,045
Referee: Tomasz Mikulski (Poland)
30 September 2008
18:00

St Patrick's Athletic (Republic of Ireland)	0–0	(Germany) Hertha BSC
	Report

RDS Arena, Dublin
Attendance: 7,000
Referee: Michael Koukoulakis (Greece)

Hertha BSC won 2–0 on aggregate.

18 September 2008
18:45

Baník Ostrava (Czech Republic)	0–1	(Russia) Spartak Moscow
	Report	Fathi 56'

Bazaly, Ostrava
Attendance: 4,120
Referee: Aleksandar Stavrev (Macedonia)
2 October 2008
18:00

Spartak Moscow (Russia)	1–1	(Czech Republic) Baník Ostrava
Bazhenov 3'	Report	Otepka 32'

Luzhniki Stadium, Moscow
Attendance: 18,000
Referee: Tony Asumaa (Finland)

Spartak Moscow won 2–1 on aggregate.

18 September 2008
19:30

Beşiktaş (Turkey)	1–0	(Ukraine) Metalist Kharkiv
Hološko 51'	Report

BJK İnönü Stadium, Istanbul
Attendance: 28,500
Referee: Martin Ingvarsson (Sweden)
2 October 2008
19:00

Metalist Kharkiv (Ukraine)	4–1	(Turkey) Beşiktaş
Jajá 20', 74'; Dević 30'; Gancarczyk 79'	Report	Nobre 90'

Metalist Stadium, Kharkiv
Attendance: 37,000
Referee: Grzegorz Gilewski (Poland)

Metalist Kharkiv won 4–2 on aggregate.

18 September 2008
19:00

Portsmouth (England)	2–0	(Portugal) Vitória de Guimarães
Diarra 39'; Defoe 60'	Report

Fratton Park, Portsmouth
Attendance: 19,612
Referee: Knut Kircher (Germany)
2 October 2008
22:35

Vitória de Guimarães (Portugal)	2–2 (a.e.t.)	(England) Portsmouth
Douglas 19'; Alves 32'	Report	Crouch 105', 111'

Estádio D. Afonso Henriques, Guimarães
Attendance: 12,000
Referee: Selçuk Dereli (Turkey)

Portsmouth won 4–2 on aggregate.

18 September 2008
20:00

Kayserispor (Turkey)	1–2	(France) Paris Saint-Germain
Toledo 87'	Report	Kežman 5'; Luyindula 89'

Kayseri Atatürk Stadium, Kayseri
Attendance: 20,000
Referee: Kevin Blom (Netherlands)
2 October 2008
21:00

Paris Saint-Germain (France)	0–0	(Turkey) Kayserispor
	Report

Parc des Princes, Paris
Attendance: 20,000
Referee: Jonas Eriksson (Sweden)

Paris Saint-Germain won 2–1 on aggregate.

18 September 2008
20:45

Sevilla (Spain)	2–0	(Austria) Red Bull Salzburg
Capel 6'; Adriano 90+2'	Report

Ramón Sánchez Pizjuán Stadium, Seville
Attendance: 40,000
Referee: Rob Styles (England)
2 October 2008
20:30

Red Bull Salzburg (Austria)	0–2	(Spain) Sevilla
	Report	Kanouté 38', 57' (pen.)

Red Bull Arena, Salzburg
Attendance: 22,500
Referee: Nikolai Ivanov (Russia)

Sevilla won 4–0 on aggregate.

18 September 2008
19:00

VfL Wolfsburg (Germany)	1–0	(Romania) Rapid București
Grafite 47' (pen.)	Report

Volkswagen Arena, Wolfsburg
Attendance: 16,245
Referee: Gianluca Rocchi (Italy)
2 October 2008
16:00

Rapid București (Romania)	1–1	(Germany) VfL Wolfsburg
Maftei 70'	Report	Grafite 15'

Stadionul Giulești-Valentin Stănescu, Bucharest
Attendance: 7,000
Referee: Paul Allaerts (Belgium)

VfL Wolfsburg won 2–1 on aggregate.

18 September 2008
20:45

Sampdoria (Italy)	5–0	(Lithuania) Kaunas
Bonazzoli 14', 22'; Cassano 36', 57'; Fornaroli 90'	Report

Stadio Luigi Ferraris, Genoa
Attendance: 16,870
Referee: Steve Tanner (England)
2 October 2008
18:00

Kaunas (Lithuania)	1–2	(Italy) Sampdoria
Zelmikas 17'	Report	Fornaroli 48'; Bonazzoli 60'

S. Darius and S. Girėnas Stadium, Kaunas
Attendance: 1,500
Referee: Alexandru Deaconu (Romania)

Sampdoria won 7–1 on aggregate.

18 September 2008
22:00

Marítimo (Portugal)	0–1	(Spain) Valencia
	Report	Morientes 12'

Estádio dos Barreiros, Funchal
Attendance: 3,000
Referee: Claudio Circhetta (Switzerland)
2 October 2008
22:00

Valencia (Spain)	2–1	(Portugal) Marítimo
Del Horno 78'; Villa 90+4' (pen.)	Report	Marcinho 41'

Mestalla Stadium, Valencia
Attendance: 28,000
Referee: Ivan Bebek (Croatia)

Valencia won 3–1 on aggregate.

18 September 2008
20:45

Dinamo Zagreb (Croatia)	0–0	(Czech Republic) Sparta Prague
	Report

Maksimir Stadium, Zagreb
Attendance: 12,000
Referee: Paolo Tagliavento (Italy)
2 October 2008
20:15

Sparta Prague (Czech Republic)	3–3	(Croatia) Dinamo Zagreb
Kulič 19'; Kladrubský 23', 82' (pen.)	Report	Morales 17'; Lovren 30'; Badelj 65'

Generali Arena, Prague
Attendance: 11,934
Referee: Duarte Gomes (Portugal)

3–3 on aggregate; Dinamo Zagreb won on away goals.

18 September 2008
19:00

Omonia (Cyprus)	1–2	(England) Manchester City
Duro 49'	Report	Jô 59', 72'

GSP Stadium, Nicosia
Attendance: 15,907
Referee: Paolo Dondarini (Italy)
2 October 2008
20:45

Manchester City (England)	2–1	(Cyprus) Omonia
Elano 48'; Wright-Phillips 55'	Report	Alabi 78'

City of Manchester Stadium, Manchester
Attendance: 26,600
Referee: Saïd Ennjimi (France)

Manchester City won 4–2 on aggregate.

18 September 2008
20:00

Young Boys (Switzerland)	2–2	(Belgium) Club Brugge
Schneuwly 16'; Doumbia 87'	Report	Sonck 36'; Clement 73'

Stade de Suisse, Bern
Attendance: 10,204
Referee: Oleh Oriekhov (Ukraine)
2 October 2008
20:45

Club Brugge (Belgium)	2–0	(Switzerland) Young Boys
Akpala 17'; Sonck 29'	Report

Jan Breydel Stadium, Bruges
Attendance: 17,225
Referee: Cristian Balaj (Romania)

Club Brugge won 4–2 on aggregate.

18 September 2008
19:00

Nancy (France)	1–0	(Scotland) Motherwell
Berenguer 42'	Report

Stade Marcel Picot, Tomblaine
Attendance: 16,094
Referee: Vladimír Hriňák (Slovakia)
2 October 2008
20:45

Motherwell (Scotland)	0–2	(France) Nancy
	Report	Fortuné 18'; Gavanon 23'

Fir Park, Motherwell
Attendance: 11,300
Referee: Espen Berntsen (Norway)

Nancy won 3–0 on aggregate.

18 September 2008
21:05

Everton (England)	2–2	(Belgium) Standard Liège
Yakubu 23'; Castillo 38'	Report	Mbokani 9'; Yobo 35' (o.g.)

Goodison Park, Liverpool
Attendance: 28,312
Referee: Grzegorz Gilewski (Poland)
2 October 2008
19:40

Standard Liège (Belgium)	2–1	(England) Everton
Witsel 22'; Jovanović 79' (pen.)	Report	Jagielka 67'

Stade Maurice Dufrasne, Liege
Attendance: 27,150
Referee: Peter Sippel (Germany)

Standard Liège won 4–3 on aggregate.

18 September 2008
21:00

Napoli (Italy)	3–2	(Portugal) Benfica
Vitale 18'; Denis 19'; Maggio 54'	Report	Suazo 16'; Luisão 59'

Stadio San Paolo, Naples
Attendance: 51,597
Referee: Björn Kuipers (Netherlands)
2 October 2008
21:15

Benfica (Portugal)	2–0	(Italy) Napoli
Reyes 57'; Nuno Gomes 84'	Report

Estádio da Luz, Lisbon
Attendance: 56,500
Referee: Wolfgang Stark (Germany)

Benfica won 4–3 on aggregate.

18 September 2008
20:00

Bellinzona (Switzerland)	3–4	(Turkey) Galatasaray
Lustrinelli 32'; Sermeter 47'; La Rocca 90'	Report	Kewell 39'; Baroš 61', 81'; Lincoln 90+5'

St. Jakob-Park, Basel
Attendance: 12,300
Referee: Sorin Corpodean (Romania)
2 October 2008
19:00

Galatasaray (Turkey)	2–1	(Switzerland) Bellinzona
Baroš 24' (pen.); Yıldız 86'	Report	Sermeter 52' (pen.)

Ali Sami Yen Stadium, Istanbul
Attendance: 19,850
Referee: Aleksei Nikolaev (Russia)

Galatasaray won 6–4 on aggregate.

18 September 2008
19:45

NEC (Netherlands)	1–0	(Romania) Dinamo București
Van Beukering 57'	Report

Stadion de Goffert, Nijmegen
Attendance: 11,750
Referee: Jouni Hyytiä (Finland)
2 October 2008
19:15

Dinamo București (Romania)	0–0	(Netherlands) NEC
	Report

Stadionul Dinamo, Bucharest
Attendance: 12,000
Referee: Stefan Johannesson (Sweden)

NEC won 1–0 on aggregate.

18 September 2008
20:30

Racing Santander (Spain)	1–0	(Finland) Honka
Pereira 57'	Report

Estadio El Sardinero, Santander
Attendance: 18,637
Referee: Fritz Stuchlik (Austria)
2 October 2008
18:30

Honka (Finland)	0–1	(Spain) Racing Santander
	Report	Bedia 4'

Finnair Stadium, Helsinki
Attendance: 9,100
Referee: Dougie McDonald (Scotland)

Racing Santander won 2–0 on aggregate.

16 September 2008
18:00

APOEL (Cyprus)	1–4	(Germany) Schalke 04
Mirosavljević 72'	Report	Westermann 25'; Rakitić 36'; Sánchez 41'; Altıntop 88'

GSP Stadium, Nicosia
Attendance: 6,500
Referee: Robert Małek (Poland)
2 October 2008
18:15

Schalke 04 (Germany)	1–1	(Cyprus) APOEL
Pander 58'	Report	Pinto 6'

Veltins-Arena, Gelsenkirchen
Attendance: 52,214
Referee: Pedro Proença (Portugal)

Schalke 04 won 5–2 on aggregate.

18 September 2008
19:45

Litex Lovech (Bulgaria)	1–3	(England) Aston Villa
Popov 10'	Report	Reo-Coker 45+1'; Barry 72' (pen.); Petrov 90+2'

Lovech Stadium, Lovech
Attendance: 7,000
Referee: Christoforos Zografos (Greece)
2 October 2008
21:00

Aston Villa (England)	1–1	(Bulgaria) Litex Lovech
Harewood 27'	Report	Niflore 53' (pen.)

Villa Park, Birmingham
Attendance: 27,225
Referee: Tony Chapron (France)

Aston Villa won 4–2 on aggregate.

18 September 2008
19:30

Austria Wien	2–1	(Poland) Lech Poznań
Schiemer 64', 76'	Report	Rengifo 65'

Franz Horr Stadium, Vienna
Attendance: 7,500
Referee: Cüneyt Çakır (Turkey)
2 October 2008
18:15

Lech Poznań (Poland)	4–2 (a.e.t.)	Austria Wien
Rengifo 10'; Peszko 85'; Lewandowski 99'; Murawski 120+1'	Report	Ačimovič 63' (pen.); Hattenberger 100'

Stadion Miejski, Poznań
Attendance: 23,650
Referee: Costas Kapitanis (Cyprus)

Lech Poznań won 5–4 on aggregate.

18 September 2008
22:00

Vitória de Setúbal (Portugal)	1–1	(Netherlands) Heerenveen
Leandro Carrijo 67'	Report	Elyounoussi 90'

Estádio José Alvalade, Lisbon (Note: Played at Alvalade XXI, since Vitória FC's home ground at Setúbal does not meet UEFA criteria)
Attendance: 3,500
Referee: Fredy Fautrel (France)
2 October 2008
20:00

Heerenveen (Netherlands)	5–2	(Portugal) Vitória de Setúbal
Paulo Henrique 4'; Sibon 11', 24'; Elyounoussi 50', 68'	Report	Gama 57'; Chaves 63'

Abe Lenstra Stadion, Heerenveen
Attendance: 23,000
Referee: Alon Yefet (Israel)

Heerenveen won 6–3 on aggregate.

18 September 2008
19:00

Brann (Norway)	2–0	(Spain) Deportivo La Coruña
Bjarnason 25' (pen.); Solli 39'	Report

Brann Stadion, Bergen
Attendance: 8,777
Referee: Johan Verbist (Austria)
2 October 2008
21:00

Deportivo La Coruña (Spain)	2–0 (a.e.t.)	(Norway) Brann
Colotto 18', 76'	Report
Penalties
Sergio (penalty scored); Mista (penalty missed); Guardado (penalty scored); Verdú (penalty scored)	3–2	(penalty scored) Bjarnson; (penalty missed) Vaagan Moen; (penalty missed) Bakke; (penalty scored) Austin; (penalty missed) Hanstveit

Estadio Riazor, A Coruña
Attendance: 20,000
Referee: Pavel Královec (Czech Republic)

2–2 on aggregate; Deportivo La Coruña won 3–2 on penalties.

18 September 2008
19:15

Slavia Prague (Czech Republic)	0–0	(Romania) Vaslui
	Report

Synot Tip Arena, Prague
Attendance: 7,781
Referee: Levan Paniashvili (Georgia)
2 October 2008
19:30

Vaslui (Romania)	1–1	(Czech Republic) Slavia Prague
Burdujan 21'	Report	Brabec 48'

Stadionul Municipal, Vaslui
Attendance: 8,750
Referee: Mark Courtney (Northern Ireland)

1–1 on aggregate; Slavia Prague won on away goals.

18 September 2008
18:30

Slaven Belupo (Croatia)	1–2	(Russia) CSKA Moscow
Jurić 43'	Report	Vágner Love 81', 89' (pen.)

Gradski stadion u Koprivnici, Koprivnica
Attendance: 3,000
Referee: David Malcolm (Northern Ireland)
30 September 2008
20:00

CSKA Moscow (Russia)	1–0	(Croatia) Slaven Belupo
A. Berezutski 37'	Report

Luzhniki Stadium, Moscow
Attendance: 5,000
Referee: Iain Brines (Scotland)

CSKA Moscow won 3–1 on aggregate.

18 September 2008
20:45

Brøndby (Denmark)	1–2	(Norway) Rosenborg
Krohn-Dehli 63'	Report	Sapara 29'; Skjelbred 55'

Brøndby Stadium, Brøndbyvester
Attendance: 11,909
Referee: Michael Weiner (Germany)
2 October 2008
18:45

Rosenborg (Norway)	3–2	(Denmark) Brøndby
Ya Konan 15'; Skjelbred 74'; Sapara 87' (pen.)	Report	M. Rasmussen 26'; Kristiansen 36'

Lerkendal Stadion, Trondheim
Attendance: 16,450
Referee: Alan Kelly (Republic of Ireland)

Rosenborg won 5–3 on aggregate.

18 September 2008
17:00

Cherno More (Bulgaria)	1–2	(Germany) VfB Stuttgart
Dyakov 42'	Report	Gómez 66', 81'

Vasil Levski National Stadium, Sofia
Attendance: 2,000
Referee: Julián Rodríguez Santiago (Spain)
2 October 2008
18:15

VfB Stuttgart (Germany)	2–2	(Bulgaria) Cherno More
Hitzlsperger 83'; Gómez 90+3'	Report	Yurukov 48'; Iliev 79'

Mercedes-Benz Arena, Stuttgart
Attendance: 10,000
Referee: Mike Dean (England)

VfB Stuttgart won 4–3 on aggregate.

18 September 2008
20:50

Rennes (France)	2–1	(Netherlands) Twente
Mbia 36'; Bocanegra 49'	Report	Denneboom 12'

Stade de la Route de Lorient, Rennes
Attendance: 12,893
Referee: Willie Collum (Scotland)
2 October 2008
20:00

Twente (Netherlands)	1–0	(France) Rennes
Nkufo 68'	Report

De Grolsch Veste, Enschede
Attendance: 20,350
Referee: Guenov (Bulgaria)

2–2 on aggregate; Twente won on away goals.

18 September 2008
21:00

Borac Čačak (Serbia)	1–4	(Netherlands) Ajax
Milovanović 50'	Report	Sulejmani 11'; Suárez 35'; Huntelaar 71', 86'

Partizan Stadium, Belgrade
Attendance: 5,000
Referee: Stanislav Sukhina (Russia)
2 October 2008
20:30

Ajax (Netherlands)	2–0	(Serbia) Borac Čačak
Sarpong 71'; Suárez 90+5'	Report

Amsterdam Arena, Amsterdam
Attendance: 18,150
Referee: Bernhard Brugger (Austria)

Ajax won 6–1 on aggregate.

18 September 2008
21:10

Tottenham Hotspur (England)	2–1	(Poland) Wisła Kraków
Bentley 33'; Bent 73'	Report	Jirsák 34'

White Hart Lane, London
Attendance: 35,751
Referee: Lucílio Batista (Portugal)
2 October 2008
16:40

Wisła Kraków (Poland)	1–1	(England) Tottenham Hotspur
Pa. Brożek 83'	Report	Głowacki 58' (o.g.)

Stadion Wisly Kraków, Kraków
Attendance: 12,900
Referee: Alexandru Tudor (Romania)

Tottenham Hotspur won 3–2 on aggregate.

18 September 2008
16:00

FC Moscow (Russia)	1–2	(Denmark) Copenhagen
Samedov 90+1'	Report	Nordstrand 45' (pen.); Sionko 90+3'

Eduard Streltsov Stadium, Moscow
Attendance: 6,000
Referee: Carlo Bertolini (Switzerland)
2 October 2008
20:45

Copenhagen (Denmark)	1–1	(Russia) FC Moscow
Sheshukov 54' (o.g.)	Report	Bracamonte 37'

Parken Stadium, Copenhagen
Attendance: 18,350
Referee: Serge Gumienny (Belgium)

Copenhagen won 3–2 on aggregate.

18 September 2008
19:30

Žilina (Slovakia)	1–1	(Bulgaria) Levski Sofia
Vladavić 49' (pen.)	Report	Joãozinho 64'

Stadium Pod Dubňom, Žilina
Attendance: 7,581
Referee: Paulo Costa (Portugal)
2 October 2008
18:30

Levski Sofia (Bulgaria)	0–1	(Slovakia) Žilina
	Report	Adauto 61'

Georgi Asparuhov Stadium, Sofia
Attendance: 10,150
Referee: Radek Matějek (Czech Republic)

Žilina won 2–1 on aggregate.

18 September 2008
20:45

Borussia Dortmund (Germany)	0–2	(Italy) Udinese
	Report	Floro Flores 8'; Inler 34'

Westfalenstadion, Dortmund
Attendance: 52,400
Referee: Stéphane Lannoy (France)
2 October 2008
20:45

Udinese (Italy)	0–2 (a.e.t.)	(Germany) Borussia Dortmund
	Report	Hajnal 45+1', 90+2'
Penalties
Domizzi (penalty missed); Quagliarella (penalty scored); Pepe (penalty scored); Inler (penalty scored); Luković (penalty scored)	4–3	(penalty missed) Hajnal; (penalty scored) Şahin; (penalty scored) Kehl; (penalty missed) Błaszczykowski; (penalty scored) Valdez

Stadio Friuli, Udine
Attendance: 13,000
Referee: César Muñiz Fernández (Spain)

2–2 on aggregate; Udinese won 4–3 on penalties.

18 September 2008
21:30

Braga (Portugal)	4–0	(Slovakia) Artmedia Petržalka
Evaldo 3'; Meyong 18', 31' (pen.), 76'	Report

Estádio Municipal de Braga, Braga
Attendance: 9,227
Referee: Svein Oddvar Moen (Norway)
2 October 2008
20:15

Artmedia Petržalka (Slovakia)	0–2	(Portugal) Braga
	Report	Aguiar 11' (pen.), 31'

Tehelné pole, Bratislava
Attendance: 1,100
Referee: Marijo Strahonja (Croatia)

Braga won 6–0 on aggregate.

18 September 2008
19:00

Feyenoord (Netherlands)	0–1	(Sweden) Kalmar FF
	Report	V. Elm 71'

De Kuip, Rotterdam
Attendance: 22,000
Referee: Darko Čeferin (Slovenia)
2 October 2008
18:30

Kalmar FF (Sweden)	1–2	(Netherlands) Feyenoord
Johansson 47'	Report	Wijnaldum 18'; Nouri 52' (o.g.)

Borås Arena, Borås (Note: Played at Borås Arena as Kalmar FF's home ground did not meet UEFA criteria.)
Attendance: 9,000
Referee: Thorsten Kinhöfer (Germany)

2–2 on aggregate; Feyenoord won on away goals.

18 September 2008
19:00

Hamburger SV (Germany)	0–0	(Romania) Unirea Urziceni
	Report

HSH Nordbank Arena, Hamburg
Attendance: 39,010
Referee: Fırat Aydınus (Turkey)
2 October 2008
18:00

Unirea Urziceni (Romania)	0–2	(Germany) Hamburger SV
	Report	Petrić 27', 51'

Stadionul Tineretului, Urziceni
Attendance: 5,500
Referee: Sten Kaldma (Estonia)

Hamburger SV won 2–0 on aggregate.

18 September 2008
18:30

Hapoel Tel Aviv (Israel)	1–2	(France) Saint-Étienne
Lala 88'	Report	Payet 7'; Feindouno 60'

Bloomfield Stadium, Tel Aviv
Attendance: 12,000
Referee: Peter Rasmussen (Denmark)
2 October 2008
19:00

Saint-Étienne (France)	2–1	(Israel) Hapoel Tel Aviv
Gomis 25', 76'	Report	Yeboah 90+1'

Stade Geoffroy-Guichard, Saint-Étienne
Attendance: 27,350
Referee: Kristinn Jakobsson (Iceland)

Saint-Étienne won 4–2 on aggregate.

16 September 2008
18:00

Nordsjælland (Denmark)	0–2	(Greece) Olympiacos
	Report	Mitroglou 74'; Leto 90+1'

Farum Park, Farum
Attendance: 5,184
Referee: Stefan Messner (Austria)
2 October 2008
20:45

Olympiacos (Greece)	5–0	(Denmark) Nordsjælland
Torosidis 11'; Diogo 30', 43'; Kovačević 72', 80'	Report

Karaiskakis Stadium, Piraeus
Attendance: 27,000
Referee: Igor Egorov (Russia)

Olympiacos won 7–0 on aggregate.
