= 2008–09 UEFA Cup =

38th season of Europe's secondary club football tournament organised by UEFA

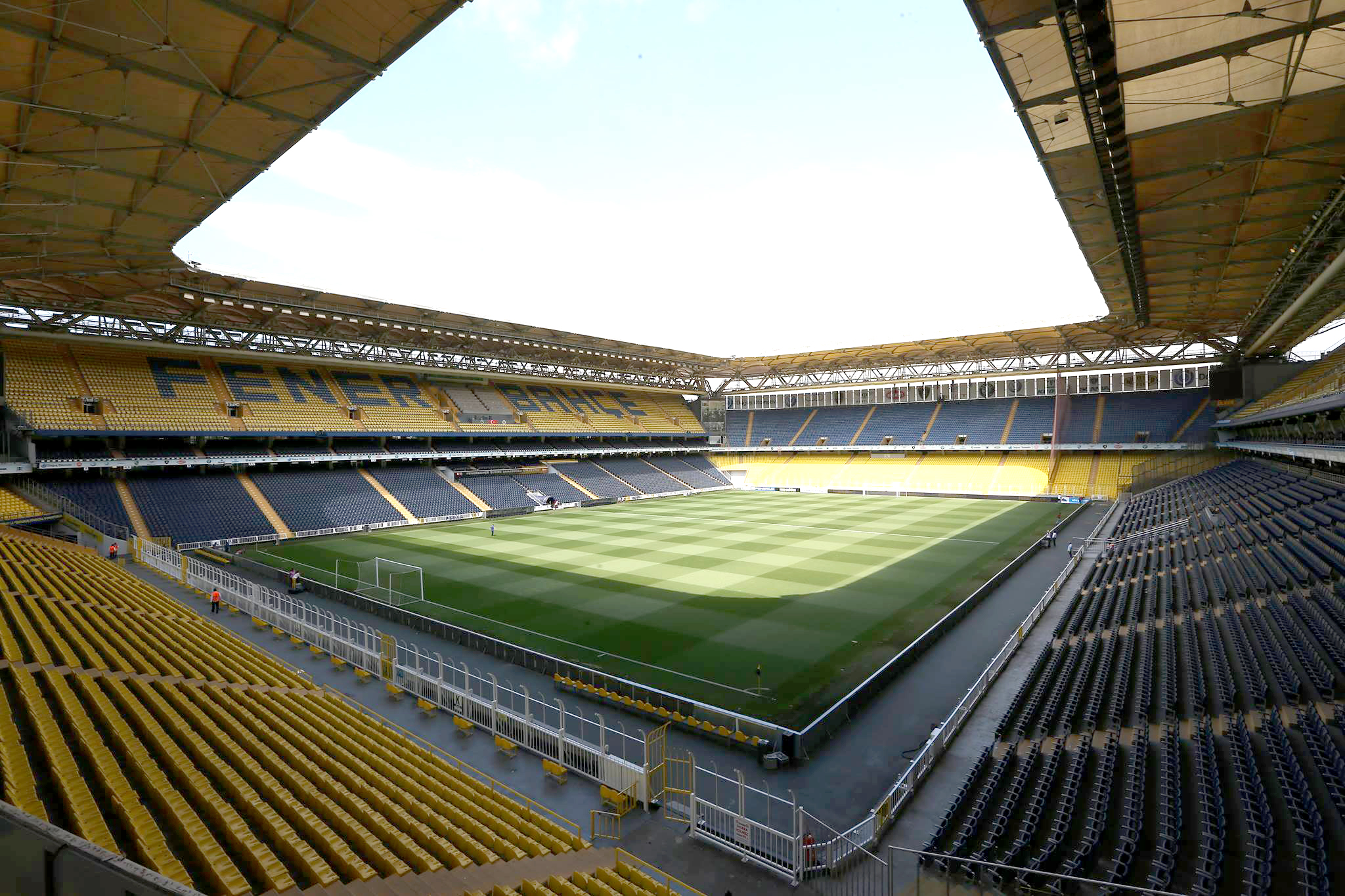
- Şükrü Saracoğlu Stadium in Istanbul hosted the final.

Tournament details
- Dates: 17 July 2008 – 20 May 2009
- Teams: 80 (competition proper); 157 (qualifying)

Final positions
- Champions: (Ukraine) Shakhtar Donetsk (1st title)
- Runners-up: (Germany) Werder Bremen

Tournament statistics
- Matches played: 221
- Goals scored: 572 (2.59 per match)
- Top scorer(s): Vágner Love (CSKA Moscow); 11 goals

The 2008–09 UEFA Cup was the 38th season of the UEFA Cup football tournament. The final was played at the Şükrü Saracoğlu Stadium, home ground of Fenerbahçe, in Istanbul on 20 May 2009. It was the last season to use the UEFA Cup format; starting in 2009, the competition was known as the UEFA Europa League. Ukraine's Shakhtar Donetsk defeated Werder Bremen 2–1 after extra time to win their first European title. Zenit Saint Petersburg, the defending champions, were eliminated by Udinese in the Round of 16.

== Association team allocation ==
A total of 157 teams from 53 UEFA associations participated in the 2008–09 UEFA Cup. Associations were allocated places according to their 2007 UEFA league coefficients, which took into account performances in European competitions from 2002–03 to 2006–07.

Below is the qualification scheme for the 2008–09 UEFA Cup:

- Associations 1–6 each have three teams qualify
- Associations 7 and 8 each have four teams qualify
- Associations 9–15 and 22–51 each have two teams qualify, except Liechtenstein, which has one team qualify (as Liechtenstein only has a domestic cup and no domestic league)
- Associations 16–21 each have three teams qualify
- Associations 52 and 53 each have one team qualify

plus

- The top three associations of the 2007–08 UEFA Fair Play ranking each gain an additional berth
- 11 winners of the 2008 UEFA Intertoto Cup
- 16 losers from the UEFA Champions League third qualifying round
- 8 third-placed teams from the UEFA Champions League group stage

=== Association ranking ===
Rank	Association	Coeff.	Teams	Notes
1	Spain	76.891	3	+1(IT)
2	England	68.540	3	+1(FP) +1(IT)
3	Italy	66.088	3	+1(UCL) +1(IT)
4	France	53.656	3	+2(UCL) +1(IT)
5	Germany	44.364	3	+2(UCL) +1(IT) +1(FP)
6	Portugal	42.749	3	+1(UCL) +1(IT)
7	Romania	40.165	4	+1(IT)
8	Netherlands	39.379	4	+1(UCL)
9	Russia	36.125	2	+2(UCL)
10	Scotland	30.500	2	
11	Ukraine	29.475	2	+2(UCL)
12	Belgium	29.075	2	+1(UCL)
13	Czech Republic	26.825	2	+2(UCL)
14	Turkey	26.641	2	+1(UCL)
15	Greece	25.497	2	+1(UCL)
16	Bulgaria	24.582	3	+1(UCL)
17	Switzerland	23.850	3	+1(IT)
18	Norway	19.725	3	+1(UCL) +1(IT)

Rank	Association	Coeff.	Teams	Notes
19	Israel	19.208	3	
20	Serbia	18.958	3	+1(UCL)
21	Denmark	18.575	3	+1(UCL) +1(FP)
22	Austria	18.500	2	+1(IT)
23	Poland	17.000	2	+1(UCL)
24	Hungary	14.165	2	
25	Slovakia	10.832	2	+1(UCL)
26	Croatia	10.708	2	+1(UCL)
27	Cyprus	10.582	2	
28	Sweden	10.541	2	+1(IT)
29	Slovenia	9.915	2	
30	Bosnia and Herzegovina	9.665	2	
31	Latvia	8.664	2	
32	Lithuania	7.332	2	+1(UCL)
33	Finland	7.331	2	
34	Moldova	7.166	2	
35	Republic of Ireland	6.498	2	
36	Georgia	6.164	2	

Rank	Association	Coeff.	Teams	Notes
37	Liechtenstein	6.000	1	
38	Macedonia	5.831	2	
39	Iceland	4.999	2	
40	Belarus	4.665	2	
41	Albania	3.832	2	
42	Estonia	3.665	2	
43	Armenia	3.498	2	
44	Azerbaijan	3.166	2	
45	Kazakhstan	2.332	2	
46	Northern Ireland	2.165	2	
47	Wales	1.998	2	
48	Faroe Islands	1.665	2	
49	Luxembourg	1.665	2	
50	Malta	1.665	2	
51	Montenegro	0.000	2	
52	Andorra	0.000	1	
53	San Marino	0.000	1	

Notes

- (FP): Additional fair play berth (Denmark, England, Germany)
- (UCL): Additional teams transferred from the UEFA Champions League

=== Distribution ===
Since the winners of the 2007–08 UEFA Cup, Zenit Saint Petersburg, qualified for the 2008–09 UEFA Champions League through domestic performance, the title holder spot reserved for them in the playoff round was vacated. As a result, the following changes to the default allocation system were made to compensate for the vacant title holder spot in the group stage:

- The domestic cup winners of associations 14 (Turkey) was promoted from the second qualifying round to the first round.
- The first UEFA Cup entrant of associations 19 and 20 (Israel and Serbia) were promoted from the first qualifying round to the second qualifying round.

	Teams entering in this round	Teams advancing from previous round	Teams transferred from Champions League	Teams transferred from Intertoto Cup
First qualifying round (74 teams)	33 cup winners from associations 21–53; 32 runners-up from associations 19–37, 39–50 and 53; 6 third-place finishers from associations 16–21; 3 entries through UEFA Fair Play			
Second qualifying round (64 teams)	6 cup winners from associations 15–20; 7 third-place finishers from associations 9–15; 3 runners-up from associations 16–18	37 winners from the first qualifying round		11 entries from UEFA Intertoto Cup
First round (80 teams)	14 national cup winners from associations 1–14; 2 third-place finishers from associations 7–8; 5 fourth-place finishers from associations 4–8; 7 fifth-place finishers from associations 1–3, 5–8; 2 sixth-place finishers from associations 1–2; 2 League Cup winners from associations 3–4	32 winners from the second qualifying round	16 losers from the UEFA Champions League third qualifying round	
Group stage (40 teams)		40 winners from the First Round		
Knockout phase (32 teams)		24 top-three finishers from the group stage	8 entries from UEFA Champions League group stage	

=== Redistribution rules ===
A UEFA Cup place is vacated when a team qualifies for both the Champions League and the UEFA Cup, or qualifies for the UEFA Cup by more than one method. When a place is vacated, it is redistributed within the national association by the following rules:

- When the domestic cup winners (considered as the "highest-placed" qualifiers within the national association) also qualify for the Champions League, their UEFA Cup place is vacated, and the remaining UEFA Cup qualifiers are moved up one place, with the final place (with the earliest starting round) taken by the domestic cup runners-up, provided they do not already qualify for the Champions League or the UEFA Cup. Otherwise, this place is taken by the highest-placed league finishers that have not yet qualified for the European competitions.
- When the domestic cup winners also qualify for the UEFA Cup through league position, their place through the league position is vacated, and the UEFA Cup qualifiers that finish lower in the league are moved up one place, with the final place taken by the highest-placed league finishers that have not yet qualified for the UEFA Cup.
- A place vacated by the League Cup winners is taken by the highest-placed league finishers that have not yet qualified for the UEFA Cup.
- A Fair Play place is taken by the highest-ranked team in the domestic Fair Play table that has not yet qualified for the Champions League or the UEFA Cup.

=== Teams ===
Round of 32
(Italy) Fiorentina (CL GS)	(France) Marseille (CL GS)	(Russia) Zenit Saint Petersburg^{TH} (CL GS)	(Ukraine) Dynamo Kyiv (CL GS)
(France) Bordeaux (CL GS)	(Germany) Werder Bremen (CL GS)	(Ukraine) Shakhtar Donetsk (CL GS)	(Denmark) AaB (CL GS)
First round
(Spain) Valencia (CW)	(Germany) Hamburger SV (4th)	(Netherlands) Heerenveen (PO)	(Belgium) Standard Liège (CL Q3)
(Spain) Sevilla (5th)	(Germany) VfL Wolfsburg (5th)	(Netherlands) NEC (PO)	(Czech Republic) Slavia Prague (CL Q3)
(Spain) Racing Santander (6th)	(Germany) Borussia Dortmund (CR)	(Russia) CSKA Moscow (CW)	(Czech Republic) Sparta Prague (CL Q3)
(England) Portsmouth (CW)	(Portugal) Benfica (4th)	(Scotland) Motherwell (3rd)	(Turkey) Galatasaray (CL Q3)
(England) Everton (5th)	(Portugal) Marítimo (5th)	(Ukraine) Metalist Kharkiv (3rd)	(Greece) Olympiacos (CL Q3)
(England) Tottenham Hotspur (LC)	(Portugal) Vitória de Setúbal (6th)	(Belgium) Club Brugge (3rd)	(Bulgaria) Levski Sofia (CL Q3)
(Italy) Milan (5th)	(Romania) Rapid București (3rd)	(Czech Republic) Baník Ostrava (3rd)	(Norway) Brann (CL Q3)
(Italy) Sampdoria (6th)	(Romania) Dinamo București (4th)	(Turkey) Kayserispor (CW)	(Serbia) Partizan (CL Q3)
(Italy) Udinese (7th)	(Romania) Unirea Urziceni (5th)	(Germany) Schalke 04 (CL Q3)	(Poland) Wisła Kraków (CL Q3)
(France) Nancy (4th)	(Romania) Timișoara (6th)	(Portugal) Vitória de Guimarães (CL Q3)	(Slovakia) Artmedia Petržalka (CL Q3)
(France) Saint-Étienne (5th)	(Netherlands) Feyenoord (CW)	(Netherlands) Twente (CL Q3)	(Croatia) Dinamo Zagreb (CL Q3)
(France) Paris Saint-Germain (CR)	(Netherlands) Ajax (PO)	(Russia) Spartak Moscow (CL Q3)	(Lithuania) Kaunas (CL Q3)
Second qualifying round
(Russia) FC Moscow (4th)	(Greece) Aris (4th)	(Israel) Maccabi Netanya (2nd)	(Portugal) Braga (IC)
(Scotland) Queen of the South (CR)	(Bulgaria) Litex Lovech (CW)	(Serbia) Red Star Belgrade (2nd)	(Romania) Vaslui (IC)
(Ukraine) Dnipro Dnipropetrovsk (4th)	(Bulgaria) Lokomotiv Sofia (3rd)	(Spain) Deportivo La Coruña (IC)	(Switzerland) Grasshopper (IC)
(Belgium) Gent (CR)	(Switzerland) Young Boys (2nd)	(England) Aston Villa (IC)	(Norway) Rosenborg (IC)
(Czech Republic) Slovan Liberec (CR)	(Switzerland) Zürich (3rd)	(Italy) Napoli (IC)	(Austria) Sturm Graz (IC)
(Turkey) Beşiktaş (3rd)	(Norway) Lillestrøm (CW)	(France) Rennes (IC)	(Sweden) IF Elfsborg (IC)
(Greece) AEK Athens (3rd)	(Norway) Stabæk (2nd)	(Germany) VfB Stuttgart (IC)	
First qualifying round
(Bulgaria) Cherno More (5th)	(Croatia) Hajduk Split (CR)	(Georgia (country)) Zestaponi (CW)	(Kazakhstan) Shakhter Karagandy (3rd)
(Switzerland) Bellinzona (CR)	(Cyprus) APOEL (CW)	(Georgia (country)) WIT Georgia (2nd)	(Northern Ireland) Glentoran (2nd)
(Norway) Viking (3rd)	(Cyprus) Omonia (3rd)	(Liechtenstein) Vaduz (CW)	(Northern Ireland) Cliftonville (3rd)
(Israel) Ironi Kiryat Shmona (3rd)	(Sweden) Kalmar FF (CW)	(North Macedonia) Milano (2nd)	(Wales) Bangor City (CW)
(Israel) Hapoel Tel Aviv (CR)	(Sweden) Djurgårdens IF (3rd)	(North Macedonia) Pelister (3rd)	(Wales) The New Saints (2nd)
(Serbia) Vojvodina (3rd)	(Slovenia) Interblock (CW)	(Iceland) FH (CW)	(Faroe Islands) EB/Streymur (CW)
(Serbia) Borac Čačak (4th)	(Slovenia) Koper (2nd)	(Iceland) ÍA (3rd)	(Faroe Islands) B36 (3rd)
(Denmark) Brøndby (CW)	(Bosnia and Herzegovina) Zrinjski Mostar (CW)	(Belarus) MTZ-RIPO Minsk (CW)	(Luxembourg) Grevenmacher (CW)
(Denmark) Midtjylland (2nd)	(Bosnia and Herzegovina) Široki Brijeg (2nd)	(Belarus) Gomel (2nd)	(Luxembourg) Racing Union (2nd)
(Denmark) Copenhagen (3rd)	(Latvia) Liepājas Metalurgs (2nd)	(Albania) Vllaznia (CW)	(Malta) Birkirkara (CW)
(Austria) Red Bull Salzburg (2nd)	(Latvia) Olimps/ASK (CR)	(Albania) Partizani (2nd)	(Malta) Marsaxlokk (2nd)
Austria Wien (3rd)	(Lithuania) Sūduva (2nd)	(Estonia) Flora (CW)	(Montenegro) Mogren (CW)
(Poland) Legia Warsaw (CW)	(Lithuania) Vėtra (CR)	(Estonia) TVMK (3rd)	(Montenegro) Zeta (2nd)
(Poland) Lech Poznań (4th)	(Finland) Haka (2nd)	(Armenia) Ararat Yerevan (CW)	(Andorra) Sant Julià (CW)
(Hungary) Debrecen (CW)	(Finland) Honka (CR)	(Armenia) Banants (2nd)	(San Marino) Juvenes/Dogana (CR)
(Hungary) Győri ETO (3rd)	(Moldova) Dacia Chișinău (2nd)	(Azerbaijan) Khazar Lankaran (CW)	(England) Manchester City (FP)
(Slovakia) Žilina (2nd)	(Moldova) Nistru Otaci (3rd)	(Azerbaijan) Olimpik Baku (2nd)	(Germany) Hertha BSC (FP)
(Slovakia) Spartak Trnava (CR)	(Republic of Ireland) Cork City (CW)	(Kazakhstan) Tobol (CW)	(Denmark) Nordsjælland (FP)
(Croatia) Slaven Belupo (2nd)	(Republic of Ireland) St Patrick's Athletic (2nd)		

Notes

1. Bulgaria (BUL): After Bulgarian champions CSKA Sofia failed to obtain a UEFA licence and replaced in the Champions League by runners-up Levski Sofia, league 3rd-placed team Lokomotiv Sofia moved up from First to Second qualifying round, while 5th-placed team Cherno More were awarded a spot in the First qualifying round.
2. Serbia (SRB): 2007–08 Serbian Cup runners-up FK Zemun failed to obtain a UEFA licence and were replaced by Serbian Superliga 4th-placed team Borac Čačak.
3. Austria (AUT): 2007–08 Austrian Cup winners SV Horn were not admitted to UEFA Cup as the Austrian Cup was limited to amateur clubs that season. Austrian Bundesliga 3rd-placed club admitted to UEFA Cup instead.
4. Poland (POL): Polish Ekstraklasa 3rd-placed team Groclin Grodzisk Wielkopolski lost their UEFA Cup spot after merger with Polonia Warsaw and were replaced by 4th-placed team Lech Poznań.
5. Northern Ireland (NIR): 2007–08 Irish Cup runners-up Coleraine failed to obtain UEFA licence and were replaced by Irish Premier League 3rd-placed team Cliftonville.

== Round and draw dates ==
The calendar shows the dates of the rounds and draw.

Schedule for 2008–09 UEFA Cup
Phase	Round	Draw date	First leg	Second leg
Qualifying	First qualifying round	1 July 2008	17 July 2008	31 July 2008
Qualifying	Second qualifying round	1 August 2008	14 August 2008	28 August 2008
First round		29 August 2008	18 September 2008	2 October 2008
Group stage	Matchday 1	7 October 2008	23 October 2008	
Group stage	Matchday 2	7 October 2008	6 November 2008	
Group stage	Matchday 3	7 October 2008	27 November 2008	
Group stage	Matchday 4	7 October 2008	3–4 December 2008	
Group stage	Matchday 5	7 October 2008	17–18 December 2008	
Knockout stage	Round of 32	19 December 2008	18–19 February 2009	26 February 2009
Knockout stage	Round of 16	19 December 2008	12 March 2009	18–19 March 2009
Knockout stage	Quarter-finals	20 March 2009	9 April 2009	16 April 2009
Knockout stage	Semi-finals	20 March 2009	30 April 2009	7 May 2009
Knockout stage	Final	20 March 2009	20 May 2009 at Şükrü Saracoğlu Stadium, Istanbul	

== Qualifying rounds ==
The three UEFA Cup regions, used for the regionalised qualifying stage draws, in a map

=== First qualifying round ===
The draw for the first qualifying round took place on 1 July 2008. The first legs were played on 17 July 2008 and the second legs were played on 29 and 31 July 2008. Three of the 37 ties were won by the team with the lower UEFA coefficient, all involving teams whose ranking was that of their association: WIT Georgia (Georgia, ranked 38) beat Spartak Trnava (Slovakia, 24); Vllaznia (Albania, 43) beat Koper (Slovenia, 29); and St Patrick's Athletic (Ireland, 35) beat Olimps/ASK (Latvia, 31).

Team 1	Agg.	Team 2	1st leg	2nd leg
Southern region
Cherno More (Bulgaria)	9–0	(Andorra) Sant Julià	4–0	5–0
Pelister (North Macedonia)	0–1	(Cyprus) APOEL	0–0	0–1
Vaduz (Liechtenstein)	1–5	(Bosnia and Herzegovina) Zrinjski Mostar	1–2	0–3
Široki Brijeg (Bosnia and Herzegovina)	3–1	(Albania) Partizani	0–0	3–1
Ironi Kiryat Shmona (Israel)	4–1	(Montenegro) Mogren	1–1	3–0
Koper (Slovenia)	1–2	(Albania) Vllaznia	1–2	0–0
Zeta (Montenegro)	1–2	(Slovenia) Interblock	1–1	0–1
Hapoel Tel Aviv (Israel)	5–0	(San Marino) Juvenes/Dogana	3–0	2–0
Hajduk Split (Croatia)	7–0	(Malta) Birkirkara	4–0	3–0
Omonia (Cyprus)	4–1	(North Macedonia) Milano	2–0	2–1
Marsaxlokk (Malta)	0–8	(Croatia) Slaven Belupo	0–4	0–4
Central–East region
Red Bull Salzburg (Austria)	10–0	(Armenia) Banants	7–0	3–0
Győri ETO (Hungary)	3–2	(Georgia (country)) Zestaponi	1–1	2–1
Ararat Yerevan (Armenia)	1–4	(Switzerland) Bellinzona	0–1	1–3
Dacia Chișinău (Moldova)	2–4	(Serbia) Borac Čačak	1–1	1–3
Tobol (Kazakhstan)	1–2	Austria Wien	1–0	0–2
Hertha BSC (Germany)	8–1	(Moldova) Nistru Otaci	8–1	0–0
Khazar Lankaran (Azerbaijan)	1–5	(Poland) Lech Poznań	0–1	1–4
Legia Warsaw (Poland)	4–1	(Belarus) Gomel	0–0	4–1
Spartak Trnava (Slovakia)	2–3	(Georgia (country)) WIT Georgia	2–2	0–1
MTZ-RIPO Minsk (Belarus)	2–3	(Slovakia) Žilina	2–2	0–1
Shakhter Karagandy (Kazakhstan)	1–2	(Hungary) Debrecen	1–1	0–1
Vojvodina (Serbia)	2–1	(Azerbaijan) Olimpik Baku	1–0	1–1
Northern region
FH (Iceland)	8–3	(Luxembourg) Grevenmacher	3–2	5–1
Vėtra (Lithuania)	1–2	(Norway) Viking	1–0	0–2
Racing Union (Luxembourg)	1–10	(Sweden) Kalmar FF	0–3	1–7
Honka (Finland)	4–2	(Iceland) ÍA	3–0	1–2
Glentoran (Northern Ireland)	1–3	(Latvia) Liepājas Metalurgs	1–1	0–2
Brøndby (Denmark)	3–0	(Faroe Islands) B36	1–0	2–0
TVMK (Estonia)	0–8	(Denmark) Nordsjælland	0–3	0–5
EB/Streymur (Faroe Islands)	0–4	(England) Manchester City	0–2	0–2
Olimps/ASK (Latvia)	0–3	(Republic of Ireland) St Patrick's Athletic	0–1	0–2
Djurgårdens IF (Sweden)	2–2 (a)	(Estonia) Flora	0–0	2–2
Sūduva (Lithuania)	2–0	(Wales) The New Saints	1–0	1–0
Cliftonville (Northern Ireland)	0–11	(Denmark) Copenhagen	0–4	0–7
Cork City (Republic of Ireland)	2–6	(Finland) Haka	2–2	0–4
Bangor City (Wales)	1–10 (Note: Midtjylland were originally drawn to play at home in the first leg, but the order of the games was reversed.)	(Denmark) Midtjylland	0–4	1–6

=== Second qualifying round ===
The draw for the second qualifying round was held on 1 August 2008 in Nyon, Switzerland, and featured 16 teams entering directly at the second qualifying round, as well as the 37 winners from the previous round and the 11 third round winners of the UEFA Intertoto Cup. The first legs were played on 14 August 2008 and the second leg on 28 August 2008. 12 of the 32 ties were won by the team with the lower UEFA coefficient. The 12 teams that lost to a lower team were: AEK Athens, Dnipro Dnipropetrovsk, Aris, Red Star Belgrade, Grasshopper, Slovan Liberec, Viking, Lokomotiv Sofia, IF Elfsborg, Gent, Queen of the South and Debrecen. St Patrick's Athletic were the only team to beat a higher-seeded team in each of the two qualifying rounds.

Team 1	Agg.	Team 2	1st leg	2nd leg
Southern region
Široki Brijeg (Bosnia and Herzegovina)	1–6	(Turkey) Beşiktaş	1–2	0–4
Braga (Portugal)	3–0	(Bosnia and Herzegovina) Zrinjski Mostar	1–0	2–0
Borac Čačak (Serbia)	2–1	(Bulgaria) Lokomotiv Sofia	1–0	1–1
Vojvodina (Serbia)	0–3	(Israel) Hapoel Tel Aviv	0–0	0–3
Aris (Greece)	1–2	(Croatia) Slaven Belupo	1–0	0–2
Litex Lovech (Bulgaria)	2–1	(Israel) Ironi Kiryat Shmona	0–0	2–1
Deportivo La Coruña (Spain)	2–0	(Croatia) Hajduk Split	0–0	2–0
APOEL (Cyprus)	5–5 (a)	(Serbia) Red Star Belgrade	2–2	3–3 (a.e.t.)
Vllaznia (Albania)	0–8	(Italy) Napoli	0–3	0–5
Maccabi Netanya (Israel)	1–3	(Bulgaria) Cherno More	1–1	0–2
AEK Athens (Greece)	2–3 (Note: Order of legs reversed)	(Cyprus) Omonia	0–1	2–2
Central–East region
Liepājas Metalurgs (Latvia)	1–5	(Romania) Vaslui	0–2	1–3
Zürich (Switzerland)	2–2 (4–2 p)	(Austria) Sturm Graz	1–1	1–1 (a.e.t.)
VfB Stuttgart (Germany)	6–2	(Hungary) Győri ETO	2–1	4–1
Lech Poznań (Poland)	6–0	(Switzerland) Grasshopper	6–0	0–0
Slovan Liberec (Czech Republic)	2–4	(Slovakia) Žilina	1–2	1–2
WIT Georgia (Georgia (country))	0–2	Austria Wien	Canc. (Note: Due to the current conflict in Georgia and the ensuing safety concerns, UEFA ordered the first leg to be cancelled. The match was held as a single leg tie in Vienna.)	0–2
Young Boys (Switzerland)	7–3	(Hungary) Debrecen	4–1	3–2
Legia Warsaw (Poland)	1–4	(Russia) FC Moscow	1–2	0–2
Dnipro Dnipropetrovsk (Ukraine)	4–4 (a)	(Switzerland) Bellinzona	3–2	1–2
Interblock (Slovenia)	0–3	(Germany) Hertha BSC	0–2	0–1
Sūduva (Lithuania)	2–4	(Austria) Red Bull Salzburg	1–4	1–0
Northern region
Djurgårdens IF (Sweden)	2–6	(Norway) Rosenborg	2–1	0–5
Queen of the South (Scotland)	2–4	(Denmark) Nordsjælland	1–2	1–2
Gent (Belgium)	2–5	(Sweden) Kalmar FF	2–1	0–4
Manchester City (England)	1–1 (4–2 p)	(Denmark) Midtjylland	0–1	1–0 (a.e.t.)
Honka (Finland)	2–1	(Norway) Viking	0–0	2–1
Haka (Finland)	0–6	(Denmark) Brøndby	0–4	0–2
Stabæk (Norway)	2–3	(France) Rennes	2–1	0–2
Copenhagen (Denmark)	7–3	(Norway) Lillestrøm	3–1	4–2
IF Elfsborg (Sweden)	3–4	(Republic of Ireland) St Patrick's Athletic	2–2	1–2
FH (Iceland)	2–5	(England) Aston Villa	1–4	1–1

== First round ==
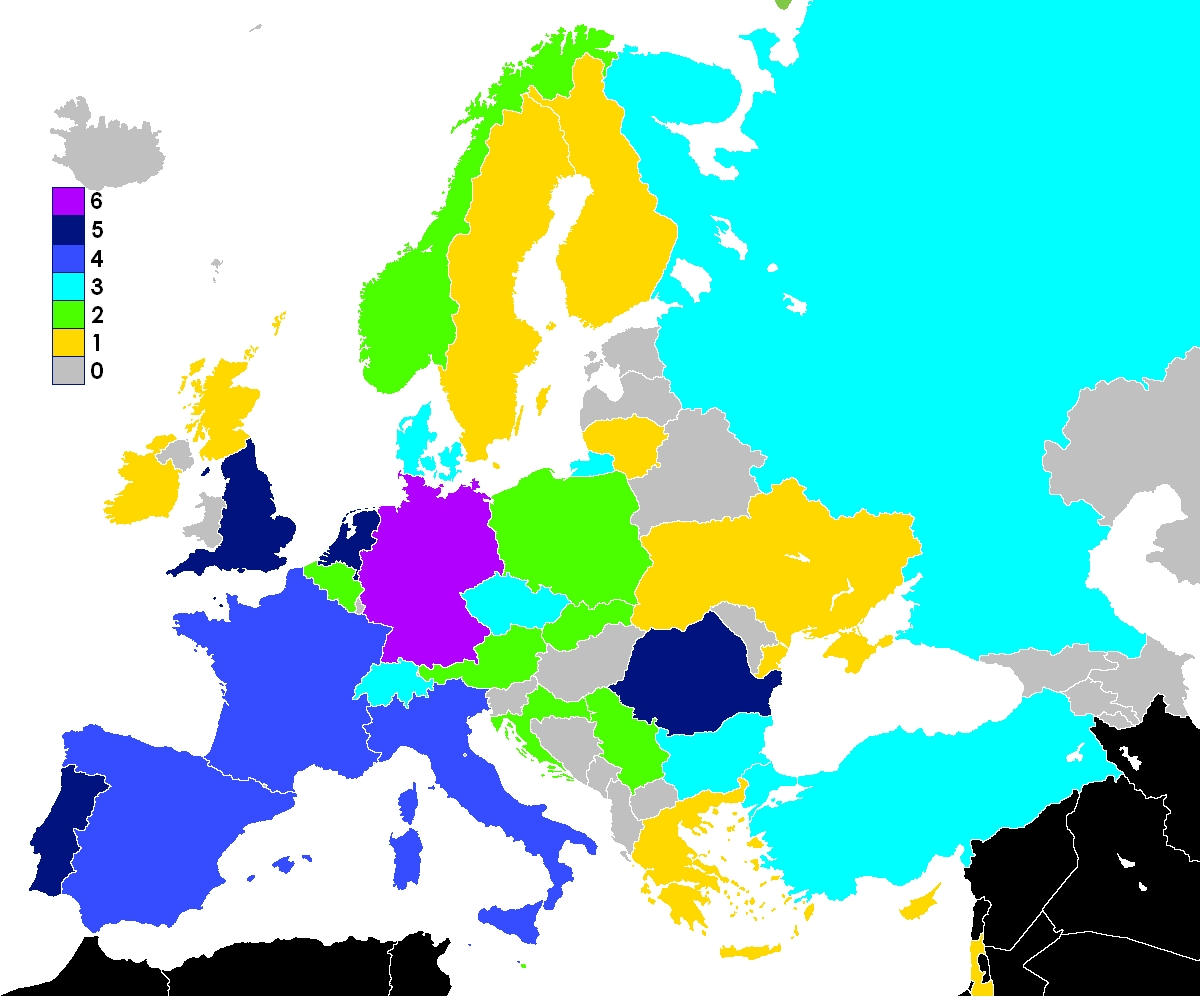
The number of each teams from each nation which qualified for the First Round

The draw, which was conducted by UEFA General Secretary David Taylor, was held on 29 August 2008 at 13:00 CET in Monaco. The matches were played on 18 September and 2 October 2008.

Nine of the 40 ties were won by the unseeded team. The nine seeded losing teams, with their ranking, were: Everton (50), Rapid București (58), Beşiktaş (60), Sparta Prague (68), Dinamo București (69), Levski Sofia (80), Austria Wien (82), Rennes (97) and Hapoel Tel Aviv (108).

Team 1	Agg.	Team 2	1st leg	2nd leg
Milan (Italy)	4–1	(Switzerland) Zürich	3–1	1–0
Timișoara (Romania)	1–3	(Serbia) Partizan	1–2	0–1
Hertha BSC (Germany)	2–0	(Republic of Ireland) St Patrick's Athletic	2–0	0–0
Baník Ostrava (Czech Republic)	1–2	(Russia) Spartak Moscow	0–1	1–1
Beşiktaş (Turkey)	2–4 (Note: Order of legs reversed)	(Ukraine) Metalist Kharkiv	1–0	1–4
Portsmouth (England)	4–2	(Portugal) Vitória de Guimarães	2–0	2–2 (a.e.t.)
Kayserispor (Turkey)	1–2	(France) Paris Saint-Germain	1–2	0–0
Sevilla (Spain)	4–0	(Austria) Red Bull Salzburg	2–0	2–0
VfL Wolfsburg (Germany)	2–1	(Romania) Rapid București	1–0	1–1
Sampdoria (Italy)	7–1	(Lithuania) Kaunas	5–0	2–1
Marítimo (Portugal)	1–3	(Spain) Valencia	0–1	1–2
Dinamo Zagreb (Croatia)	3–3 (a)	(Czech Republic) Sparta Prague	0–0	3–3
Omonia (Cyprus)	2–4	(England) Manchester City	1–2	1–2
Young Boys (Switzerland)	2–4	(Belgium) Club Brugge	2–2	0–2
Nancy (France)	3–0	(Scotland) Motherwell	1–0	2–0
Everton (England)	3–4	(Belgium) Standard Liège	2–2	1–2
Napoli (Italy)	3–4	(Portugal) Benfica	3–2	0–2
Bellinzona (Switzerland)	4–6	(Turkey) Galatasaray	3–4	1–2
NEC (Netherlands)	1–0	(Romania) Dinamo București	1–0	0–0
Racing Santander (Spain)	2–0	(Finland) Honka	1–0	1–0
APOEL (Cyprus)	2–5	(Germany) Schalke 04	1–4	1–1
Litex Lovech (Bulgaria)	2–4	(England) Aston Villa	1–3	1–1
Austria Wien	4–5	(Poland) Lech Poznań	2–1	2–4 (a.e.t.)
Vitória de Setúbal (Portugal)	3–6	(Netherlands) Heerenveen	1–1	2–5
Brann (Norway)	2–2 (2–3 p)	(Spain) Deportivo La Coruña	2–0	0–2 (a.e.t.)
Slavia Prague (Czech Republic)	1–1 (a)	(Romania) Vaslui	0–0	1–1
Slaven Belupo (Croatia)	1–3	(Russia) CSKA Moscow	1–2	0–1
Brøndby (Denmark)	3–5	(Norway) Rosenborg	1–2	2–3
Cherno More (Bulgaria)	3–4	(Germany) VfB Stuttgart	1–2	2–2
Rennes (France)	2–2 (a)	(Netherlands) Twente	2–1	0–1
Borac Čačak (Serbia)	1–6	(Netherlands) Ajax	1–4	0–2
Tottenham Hotspur (England)	3–2	(Poland) Wisła Kraków	2–1	1–1
FC Moscow (Russia)	2–3	(Denmark) Copenhagen	1–2	1–1
Žilina (Slovakia)	2–1	(Bulgaria) Levski Sofia	1–1	1–0
Borussia Dortmund (Germany)	2–2 (3–4 p)	(Italy) Udinese	0–2	2–0 (a.e.t.)
Braga (Portugal)	6–0	(Slovakia) Artmedia Petržalka	4–0	2–0
Feyenoord (Netherlands)	2–2 (a)	(Sweden) Kalmar FF	0–1	2–1
Hamburger SV (Germany)	2–0	(Romania) Unirea Urziceni	0–0	2–0
Hapoel Tel Aviv (Israel)	2–4	(France) Saint-Étienne	1–2	1–2
Nordsjælland (Denmark)	0–7	(Greece) Olympiacos	0–2	0–5

== Group stage ==
Teams that have qualified for the group stage of the 2008–09 UEFA Cup
Red: Group A; Yellow: Group B; Green: Group C; Black: Group D;
Purple: Group E; Pink: Group F; Blue: Group G; Orange: Group H.

The draw for the group stage of the 2008–09 UEFA Cup was held at UEFA Headquarters in Nyon, Switzerland, on 7 October 2008. The 40 teams in the draw were divided into five pots based on their UEFA coefficients. The eight teams with the highest UEFA coefficient were allocated to Pot 1, the next eight teams to Pot 2, and so on. One team from each pot was drawn for each group, with the restriction that no team could be drawn with one from the same country.

The top three teams (highlighted in green) of each group qualified for the next round. Based on paragraph 6.06 in the UEFA regulations for the current season, if two or more teams are equal on points on completion of the group matches, the following criteria are applied to determine the rankings:

1. superior goal difference from all group matches played;
2. higher number of goals scored;
3. higher number of goals scored away;
4. higher number of wins;
5. higher number of away wins;
6. higher number of coefficient points accumulated by the club in question, as well as its association, over the previous five seasons.

=== Group A ===
Pos	Team	Pld	W	D	L	GF	GA	GD	Pts	Qualification	MC	TWE	PSG	RSA	SCH
1	(England) Manchester City	4	2	1	1	6	5	+1	7	Advance to knockout stage	—	3–2	0–0	—	—
2	(Netherlands) Twente	4	2	0	2	5	8	−3	6	Advance to knockout stage	—	—	—	1–0	2–1
3	(France) Paris Saint-Germain	4	1	2	1	7	5	+2	5	Advance to knockout stage	—	4–0	—	2–2	—
4	(Spain) Racing Santander	4	1	2	1	6	5	+1	5		3–1	—	—	—	1–1
5	(Germany) Schalke 04	4	1	1	2	5	6	−1	4		0–2	—	3–1	—	—

Source: RSSSF

=== Group B ===
Pos	Team	Pld	W	D	L	GF	GA	GD	Pts	Qualification	MET	GAL	OLY	HER	BEN
1	(Ukraine) Metalist Kharkiv	4	3	1	0	3	0	+3	10	Advance to knockout stage	—	—	1–0	0–0	—
2	(Turkey) Galatasaray	4	3	0	1	4	1	+3	9	Advance to knockout stage	0–1	—	1–0	—	—
3	(Greece) Olympiacos	4	2	0	2	9	3	+6	6	Advance to knockout stage	—	—	—	4–0	5–1
4	(Germany) Hertha BSC	4	0	2	2	1	6	−5	2		—	0–1	—	—	1–1
5	(Portugal) Benfica	4	0	1	3	2	9	−7	1		0–1	0–2	—	—	—

Source: RSSSF

=== Group C ===
Pos	Team	Pld	W	D	L	GF	GA	GD	Pts	Qualification	STD	STU	SAM	SEV	PTZ
1	(Belgium) Standard Liège	4	3	0	1	5	3	+2	9	Advance to knockout stage	—	—	3–0	1–0	—
2	(Germany) VfB Stuttgart	4	2	1	1	6	3	+3	7	Advance to knockout stage	3–0	—	—	—	2–0
3	(Italy) Sampdoria	4	2	1	1	4	5	−1	7	Advance to knockout stage	—	1–1	—	1–0	—
4	(Spain) Sevilla	4	2	0	2	5	2	+3	6		—	2–0	—	—	3–0
5	(Serbia) Partizan	4	0	0	4	1	8	−7	0		0–1	—	1–2	—	—

Source: RSSSF

=== Group D ===
Pos	Team	Pld	W	D	L	GF	GA	GD	Pts	Qualification	UDI	TOT	NEC	SPA	DZ
1	(Italy) Udinese	4	3	0	1	6	4	+2	9	Advance to knockout stage	—	2–0	—	—	2–1
2	(England) Tottenham Hotspur	4	2	1	1	7	4	+3	7	Advance to knockout stage	—	—	—	2–2	4–0
3	(Netherlands) NEC	4	2	0	2	6	5	+1	6	Advance to knockout stage	2–0	0–1	—	—	—
4	(Russia) Spartak Moscow	4	1	1	2	5	6	−1	4		1–2	—	1–2	—	—
5	(Croatia) Dinamo Zagreb	4	1	0	3	4	9	−5	3		—	—	3–2	0–1	—

Source: RSSSF

=== Group E ===
Pos	Team	Pld	W	D	L	GF	GA	GD	Pts	Qualification	WOL	ACM	BRA	POR	HVN
1	(Germany) VfL Wolfsburg	4	3	1	0	13	7	+6	10	Advance to knockout stage	—	—	—	3–2	5–1
2	(Italy) Milan	4	2	2	0	8	5	+3	8	Advance to knockout stage	2–2	—	1–0	—	—
3	(Portugal) Braga	4	2	0	2	7	5	+2	6	Advance to knockout stage	2–3	—	—	3–0	—
4	(England) Portsmouth	4	1	1	2	7	8	−1	4		—	2–2	—	—	3–0
5	(Netherlands) Heerenveen	4	0	0	4	3	13	−10	0		—	1–3	1–2	—	—

Source: RSSSF

=== Group F ===
Pos	Team	Pld	W	D	L	GF	GA	GD	Pts	Qualification	HSV	AJA	AST	ZIL	SLA
1	(Germany) Hamburger SV	4	3	0	1	7	3	+4	9	Advance to knockout stage	—	0–1	3–1	—	—
2	(Netherlands) Ajax	4	2	1	1	5	4	+1	7	Advance to knockout stage	—	—	—	1–0	2–2
3	(England) Aston Villa	4	2	0	2	5	6	−1	6	Advance to knockout stage	—	2–1	—	1–2	—
4	(Slovakia) Žilina	4	1	1	2	3	4	−1	4		1–2	—	—	—	0–0
5	(Czech Republic) Slavia Prague	4	0	2	2	2	5	−3	2		0–2	—	0–1	—	—

Source: RSSSF

=== Group G ===
Pos	Team	Pld	W	D	L	GF	GA	GD	Pts	Qualification	STE	VAL	FCK	BRU	ROS
1	(France) Saint-Étienne	4	2	2	0	9	4	+5	8	Advance to knockout stage	—	2–2	—	—	3–0
2	(Spain) Valencia	4	1	3	0	8	4	+4	6	Advance to knockout stage	—	—	1–1	1–1	—
3	(Denmark) Copenhagen	4	1	2	1	4	5	−1	5	Advance to knockout stage	1–3	—	—	—	1–1
4	(Belgium) Club Brugge	4	0	3	1	2	3	−1	3		1–1	—	0–1	—	—
5	(Norway) Rosenborg	4	0	2	2	1	8	−7	2		—	0–4	—	0–0	—

Source: RSSSF

=== Group H ===
Pos	Team	Pld	W	D	L	GF	GA	GD	Pts	Qualification	CSK	DEP	LPO	NAN	FEY
1	(Russia) CSKA Moscow	4	4	0	0	12	5	+7	12	Advance to knockout stage	—	3–0	2–1	—	—
2	(Spain) Deportivo La Coruña	4	2	1	1	5	4	+1	7	Advance to knockout stage	—	—	—	1–0	3–0
3	(Poland) Lech Poznań	4	1	2	1	5	5	0	5	Advance to knockout stage	—	1–1	—	2–2	—
4	(France) Nancy	4	1	1	2	8	7	+1	4		3–4	—	—	—	3–0
5	(Netherlands) Feyenoord	4	0	0	4	1	10	−9	0		1–3	—	0–1	—	—

Source: RSSSF

== Knockout stage ==
In the knockout phase, teams played against each other over two legs on a home-and-away basis, except for the one-match final. The draw mechanism for each round is as follows:

- In the draw for the round of 32, matches were played between the winner of one group and the third-placed team of a different group, and between the runners-up of one group and the third-placed team from a Champions League group, with the group winner and runner-up host the second leg. Teams from the same national association or have played in the same group in the group stages cannot be drawn together.
- From the round of 16 onwards, these restrictions did not apply, and teams from same group or same association could be drawn together.

=== Bracket ===
Round of 32
(France) Paris Saint-Germain	2	3	5
(Germany) VfL Wolfsburg	0	1	1
(Portugal) Braga	3	1	4
(Belgium) Standard Liège	0	1	1
(Ukraine) Dynamo Kyiv (a)	1	2	3
(Spain) Valencia	1	2	3
(Italy) Sampdoria	0	0	0
(Ukraine) Metalist Kharkiv	1	2	3
(England) Aston Villa	1	0	1
(Russia) CSKA Moscow	1	2	3
(Ukraine) Shakhtar Donetsk	2	1	3
(England) Tottenham Hotspur	0	1	1
(France) Marseille (p)	0	1	1 (7)
(Netherlands) Twente	1	0	1 (6)
(Italy) Fiorentina	0	1	1
(Netherlands) Ajax	1	1	2
(Germany) Werder Bremen (a)	1	2	3
(Italy) Milan	1	2	3
(Greece) Olympiacos	1	1	2
(France) Saint-Étienne	2	3	5
(Poland) Lech Poznań	2	1	3
(Italy) Udinese	2	2	4
(Russia) Zenit Saint Petersburg	2	2	4
(Germany) VfB Stuttgart	1	1	2
(Netherlands) NEC	0	0	0
(Germany) Hamburger SV	3	1	4
(France) Bordeaux	0	3	3
(Turkey) Galatasaray	0	4	4
(Denmark) Copenhagen	2	1	3
(England) Manchester City	2	2	4
(Denmark) AaB	3	3	6
(Spain) Deportivo La Coruña	0	1	1

Round of 16
(France) Paris Saint-Germain	0	1	1
(Portugal) Braga	0	0	0
(Ukraine) Dynamo Kyiv (a)	1	2	3
(Ukraine) Metalist Kharkiv	0	3	3
(Russia) CSKA Moscow	1	0	1
(Ukraine) Shakhtar Donetsk	0	2	2
(France) Marseille (a.e.t.)	2	2	4
(Netherlands) Ajax	2	1	3
(Germany) Werder Bremen	1	2	3
(France) Saint-Étienne	0	2	2
(Italy) Udinese	2	0	2
(Russia) Zenit Saint Petersburg	0	1	1
(Germany) Hamburger SV	1	3	4
(Turkey) Galatasaray	1	2	3
(England) Manchester City (p)	2	0	2 (4)
(Denmark) AaB	0	2	2 (3)

Quarter-finals
(France) Paris Saint-Germain	0	0	0
(Ukraine) Dynamo Kyiv	0	3	3
(Ukraine) Shakhtar Donetsk	2	2	4
(France) Marseille	0	1	1
(Germany) Werder Bremen	3	3	6
(Italy) Udinese	1	3	4
(Germany) Hamburger SV	3	1	4
(England) Manchester City	1	2	3

Semi-finals
(Ukraine) Dynamo Kyiv	1	1	2
(Ukraine) Shakhtar Donetsk	1	2	3
(Germany) Werder Bremen (a)	0	3	3
(Germany) Hamburger SV	1	2	3

Final
20 May – Istanbul
(Ukraine) Shakhtar Donetsk (a.e.t.)	2
(Germany) Werder Bremen	1

=== Round of 32 ===
The draw for the round of 32 took place on 19 December 2008, the day after the final round of UEFA Cup group stage matches. The first legs were played on 18 February and 19 February, and the second leg matches were played on 26 February 2009.

Manchester City were the only team from the first qualifying round to reach the round of 16. Braga were the only team from the Intertoto Cup to reach the round of 16 and were therefore awarded the title of Intertoto Cup winners. Of the eight teams who had been placed in Pot 5 of the group stage draw, only Metalist Kharkiv and Saint-Étienne reached the round of 16. Of the eight teams that entered the Round of the 32 from the UEFA Champions League group stage, two lost: Fiorentina and Bordeaux. Of the eight ties between a third-placed team and a first-placed team from the UEFA Cup group stage, two were won by the third-placed team; the winners were Braga and Paris Saint-Germain.

Team 1	Agg.	Team 2	1st leg	2nd leg
Paris Saint-Germain (France)	5–1	(Germany) VfL Wolfsburg	2–0	3–1
Copenhagen (Denmark)	3–4	(England) Manchester City	2–2	1–2
NEC (Netherlands)	0–4	(Germany) Hamburger SV	0–3	0–1
Sampdoria (Italy)	0–3	(Ukraine) Metalist Kharkiv	0–1	0–2
Braga (Portugal)	4–1	(Belgium) Standard Liège	3–0	1–1
Aston Villa (England)	1–3	(Russia) CSKA Moscow	1–1	0–2
Lech Poznań (Poland)	3–4	(Italy) Udinese	2–2	1–2
Olympiacos (Greece)	2–5	(France) Saint-Étienne	1–3	1–2
Fiorentina (Italy)	1–2	(Netherlands) Ajax	0–1	1–1
AaB (Denmark)	6–1	(Spain) Deportivo La Coruña	3–0	3–1
Werder Bremen (Germany)	3–3 (a)	(Italy) Milan	1–1	2–2
Bordeaux (France)	3–4	(Turkey) Galatasaray	0–0	3–4
Dynamo Kyiv (Ukraine)	3–3 (a)	(Spain) Valencia	1–1	2–2
Zenit Saint Petersburg (Russia)	4–2	(Germany) VfB Stuttgart	2–1	2–1
Marseille (France)	1–1 (7–6 p)	(Netherlands) Twente	0–1	1–0 (a.e.t.)
Shakhtar Donetsk (Ukraine)	3–1	(England) Tottenham Hotspur	2–0	1–1

=== Round of 16 ===
The draw for the round of 16 took place on 19 December 2008, immediately after the draw for the round of 32. The first leg matches were played on 12 March, and the second leg matches were played on 18 March and 19 March 2009.

Team 1	Agg.	Team 2	1st leg	2nd leg
Werder Bremen (Germany)	3–2	(France) Saint-Étienne	1–0	2–2
CSKA Moscow (Russia)	1–2	(Ukraine) Shakhtar Donetsk	1–0	0–2
Udinese (Italy)	2–1	(Russia) Zenit Saint Petersburg	2–0	0–1
Paris Saint-Germain (France)	1–0	(Portugal) Braga	0–0	1–0
Dynamo Kyiv (Ukraine)	3–3 (a)	(Ukraine) Metalist Kharkiv	1–0	2–3
Manchester City (England)	2–2 (4–3 p)	(Denmark) AaB	2–0	0–2 (a.e.t.)
Marseille (France)	4–3	(Netherlands) Ajax	2–1	2–2 (a.e.t.)
Hamburger SV (Germany)	4–3	(Turkey) Galatasaray	1–1	3–2

=== Quarter-finals ===
The draw for the quarter-finals took place on 20 March 2009. The first legs were played on 9 April and the second legs were played on 16 April.

Team 1	Agg.	Team 2	1st leg	2nd leg
Hamburger SV (Germany)	4–3	(England) Manchester City	3–1	1–2
Paris Saint-Germain (France)	0–3	(Ukraine) Dynamo Kyiv	0–0	0–3
Shakhtar Donetsk (Ukraine)	4–1	(France) Marseille	2–0	2–1
Werder Bremen (Germany)	6–4	(Italy) Udinese	3–1	3–3

=== Semi-finals ===
The draw for the semi-finals took place on 20 March 2009, immediately after the draw for the quarter-finals. The first legs were played on 30 April and the second legs on 7 May.

Team 1	Agg.	Team 2	1st leg	2nd leg
Werder Bremen (Germany)	3–3 (a)	(Germany) Hamburger SV	0–1	3–2
Dynamo Kyiv (Ukraine)	2–3	(Ukraine) Shakhtar Donetsk	1–1	1–2

=== Final ===
The final was played on 20 May 2009 at the Şükrü Saracoğlu Stadium in Istanbul, Turkey.

20 May 2009
21:45 UTC+3

Shakhtar Donetsk (Ukraine)	2–1 (a.e.t.)	(Germany) Werder Bremen
Luiz Adriano 25'; Jádson 97'	Report	Naldo 35'

Şükrü Saracoğlu Stadium, Istanbul
Attendance: 37,357
Referee: Luis Medina Cantalejo (Spain)

== Top goalscorers ==
Rank	Name	Team	Goals
1	(Brazil) Vágner Love	(Russia) CSKA Moscow	11
2	(Croatia) Ivica Olić	(Germany) Hamburger SV	9
3	(Italy) Fabio Quagliarella	(Italy) Udinese	8
4	(Brazil) Diego	(Germany) Werder Bremen	6
4	(Germany) Mario Gómez	(Germany) VfB Stuttgart	6
4	(Uruguay) Luis Aguiar	(Portugal) Braga	6
4	(France) Peguy Luyindula	(France) Paris Saint-Germain	6
8	(Czech Republic) Milan Baroš	(Turkey) Galatasaray	5
8	(Brazil) Diogo	(Greece) Olympiacos	5
8	(Brazil) Ilan	(France) Saint-Étienne	5
8	(Cameroon) Albert Meyong	(Portugal) Braga	5
8	(Croatia) Mladen Petrić	(Germany) Hamburger SV	5
8	(Peru) Claudio Pizarro	(Germany) Werder Bremen	5
8	(Peru) Hernán Rengifo	(Poland) Lech Poznań	5
8	(Uruguay) Luis Suárez	(Netherlands) Ajax	5

Source: Hammond, Mike, ed (2009). The European Football Yearbook 2009/10. London: Carlton Books. ISBN 978-1-84732-360-6.

== See also ==
- 2008–09 UEFA Champions League
- 2008 UEFA Intertoto Cup
- 2009 UEFA Super Cup
