= 1993–94 Czech Cup =

Pohár ČMFS

Tournament details
- Country: Czech Republic

Final positions
- Champions: Viktoria Žižkov
- Runners-up: Sparta Prague

Tournament statistics
- Top goal scorer: Horst Siegl (5)

The 1993–94 Czech Cup was the first season of the annual football knock-out tournament of the Czech Republic. Winners Viktoria Žižkov qualified for the 1994–95 UEFA Cup Winners' Cup.

== Round 3 ==
Team 1	Score	Team 2
Armaturka Ústí nad Labem	1–1; 5–4 pen	Union Cheb
Sklobižu Jablonec nad Nisou	2–2; 2–3 pen	Viktoria Plzeň
Švarc Benešov	3–0	České Budějovice
VTJ Kroměříž	2–4	Boby Brno
VP Frýdek-Místek	2–4	Svit Zlín
Libuš	1–0	Mladá Boleslav
Železárny Třinec	0–8	Baník Ostrava
NH Ostrava	1–3	Sigma Olomouc
Alfa Brandýs nad Labem	1–2	Slovan Liberec
Vlašim	0–4	Viktoria Žižkov
Český Brod	0–0; 1–3 pen	Hradec Králové
Baník Havířov	0–3	Kovkor Vitkovice
Trutnov	1–1; 1–3 pen	Bohemians Prague
Znojmo	1–3	Petra Drnovice
Portal Příbram	1–5	Slavia Prague
Teplice	1–2	Sparta Prague

== Round 4 ==
Fourth round matches were played on 6 October 1993, except the Ústí nad Labem versus Sparta Prague match, which was played on 31 March 1994.

Team 1	Score	Team 2
Švarc Benešov	1–2	Viktoria Plzeň
Boby Brno	4–0	Svit Zlín
Libuš	0–1	Baník Ostrava
Slovan Liberec	0–1	Sigma Olomouc
Hradec Králové	0–1	Viktoria Žižkov
Bohemians Prague	0–0; 6–5 pen	Kovkor Vitkovice
Slavia Prague	6–1	Petra Drnovice
Armaturka Ústí nad Labem	0–7	Sparta Prague

== Quarterfinals ==
The quarterfinals were played on 27 April 1994.

Team 1	Score	Team 2
Viktoria Žižkov	4–0	Viktoria Plzeň
Sparta Prague	1–0	Bohemians Prague
Slavia Prague	2–1	Sigma Olomouc
Baník Ostrava	2–1	Boby Brno

== Semifinals ==
The semifinals were played on 11 May 1994.

Team 1	Score	Team 2
Baník Ostrava	0–2	Sparta Prague
Viktoria Žižkov	3–1	Slavia Prague

== Final ==
13 June 1994
17:00 CEST

Viktoria Žižkov	2–2 (a.e.t.)	Sparta Prague
Trval 79', 120' (pen.)		40' Gunda; 104' J. Kostelník
Penalties
	6–5

Stadion Evžena Rošického, Prague
Attendance: 7,011
Referee: Petr Mádl

== See also ==
- 1993–94 Czech First League
- 1993–94 Czech 2. Liga
