= Prague derby =

Association football rivalry

Prague Derby
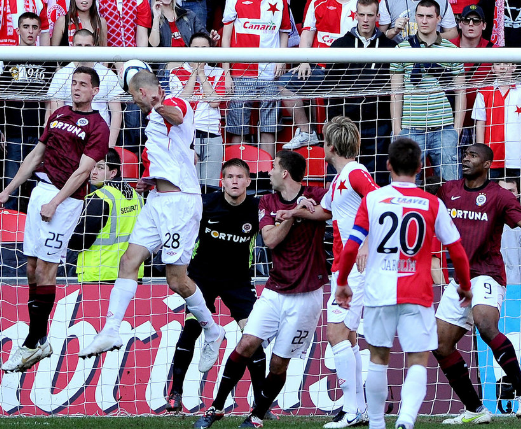
- The Prague Derby, 2012
- Other names: Pražské derby
- Location: Prague, Czech Republic
- Teams: Slavia Prague; Sparta Prague
- First meeting: 29 March 1896

Statistics
- Total meetings: 312
- Most wins: Sparta Prague (137)
- All-time series: Sparta: 135; Drawn: 77; Slavia: 105
- Largest victory: Sparta 1–9 Slavia (1907)

Slavia Prague	Sparta Prague

The Prague Derby (Czech: Pražské derby) or Derby of the Prague S (Czech: Derby pražských S) is a football match between local Prague rivals SK Slavia Prague and AC Sparta Prague. The two clubs are considered to be the most successful in Czech football, having won league and cup titles on numerous occasions. The two were both founded in the late 19th century, Slavia one year before their rivals in 1892, though Slavia did not play football until four years later. The first match between the teams was played on 29 March 1896, with the game finishing 0–0. The two clubs are the most successful and famous in the country and their dominance has led the derby to be referred to in a similar way as the Scottish Old Firm.

The rivalry between the Prague "S" teams is significant, as Sparta grew out of a working-class background and Slavia from a student one; the former has a reputation for being supported primarily by workers, while the latter is said to be backed by high-ranking officials and the social elite—though in reality, this is not the case. A 2026 geographical mobility study revealed that local Prague residents account for less than 40% of the home crowd for AC Sparta Prague matches, compared to approximately 45.5% for SK Slavia Prague, with the remainder of match attendees commuting from other regions of the Czech Republic.

The 250th meeting of the clubs took place in December 2000. The biggest margin of victory in the fixture is Slavia's 9–1 win in 1907. Sparta's widest margin of victory came in an 8–1 win in 1952. As of 5 December 2021 the fixture has been played 303 times. Sparta have won 136 of those matches, 72 ended as a draw and Slavia have won 95.

== Statistics and records ==
Updated 8 March 2026

	Matches	Wins Slavia Prague	Draws	Wins Sparta Prague	Goals Slavia Prague	Goals Sparta Prague
League	82	22	28	32	95	107
Cup	11	7	0	4	15	10
Total official matches	93	29	28	36	110	127

== List of matches ==
=== League ===
		Slavia Prague vs. Sparta Prague				Sparta Prague vs. Slavia Prague			
Season	Division	Date	Venue	Score	Atten.	Date	Venue	Score	Atten.
1984–85	Czechoslovak First League	28–05–1985	Stadion Eden	0–2	20,000	19–11–1984	Strahov Stadium	2–0	17,000
1985–86	Czechoslovak First League	03–11–1985	Stadion Eden	1–0	6,289	25–05–1986	Strahov Stadium	2–1	19,536
1986–87	Czechoslovak First League	01–09–1986	Stadion Eden	0–0	10,720	30–03–1987	Strahov Stadium	3–0	15,491
1987–88	Czechoslovak First League	20–09–1987	Stadion Eden	0–1	6,828	22–04–1988	Strahov Stadium	5–0	20,511
1988–89	Czechoslovak First League	15–05–1989	Stadion Eden	3–0	10,203	12–10–1988	Strahov Stadium	2–1	28,105
1989–90	Czechoslovak First League	17–03–1990	Stadion Eden	0–1	5,329	28–08–1989	Strahov Stadium	3–0	9,900
1990–91	Czechoslovak First League	23–08–1990	Stadion Eden	3–3	4,733	18–03–1991	Strahov Stadium	4–1	12,710
1991–92	Czechoslovak First League	14–03–1992	Stadion Eden	1–1	6,712	18–08–1991	Strahov Stadium	0–1	24,401
1992–93	Czechoslovak First League	12–09–1992	Stadion Eden	2–0	17,580	29–03–1993	Strahov Stadium	0–2	29,270
1993–94	Czech First League	17–09–1993	Stadion Eden	1–1	8,380	09–04–1994	Strahov Stadium	4–1	9,976
1994–95	Czech First League	07–04–1995	Stadion Eden	0–1	13,456	09–09–1994	Letná Stadium	0–0	16,380
1995–96	Czech First League	09–09–1995	Stadion Eden	0–2	10,036	23–03–1996	Letná Stadium	3–1	15,437
1996–97	Czech First League	25–03–1997	Stadion Eden	1–1	12,123	21–09–1996	Letná Stadium	1–1	11,162
1997–98	Czech First League	13–09–1997	Stadion Eden	0–1	9,339	30–03–1998	Letná Stadium	1–1	15,628
1998–99	Czech First League	04–05–1999	Stadion Eden	1–0	10,106	21–09–1998	Letná Stadium	0–0	13,065
1999–00	Czech First League	08–11–1999	Stadion Eden	2–1	13,532	06–05–2000	Letná Stadium	5–1	18,849
2000–01	Czech First League	01–12–2000	Stadion Evžena Rošického	1–3	8,590	16–03–2001	Letná Stadium	4–4	16,350
2001–02	Czech First League	13–10–2001	Stadion Evžena Rošického	0–1	10,123	05–04–2002	Letná Stadium	1–1	12,686
2002–03	Czech First League	23–09–2002	Stadion Evžena Rošického	0–0	8,421	12–04–2003	Letná Stadium	2–0	18,228
2003–04	Czech First League	14–03–2004	Stadion Evžena Rošického	0–2	16,156	30–08–2003	Letná Stadium	0–0	16,662
2004–05	Czech First League	16–04–2005	Stadion Evžena Rošického	1–1	12,881	16–10–2004	Toyota Arena	2–0	15,012
2005–06	Czech First League	23–10–2005	Stadion Evžena Rošického	4–1	14,542	08–04–2006	Toyota Arena	2–1	20,318
2006–07	Czech First League	02–10–2006	Stadion Evžena Rošického	0–0	14,343	23–04–2007	Toyota Arena	1–0	20,318
2007–08	Czech First League	31–03–2008	Stadion Evžena Rošického	1–1	16,205	08–10–2007	AXA Arena	0–2	20,565
2008–09	Czech First League	13–04–2009	Synot Tip Arena	1–1	20,156	06–10–2008	AXA Arena	1–4	20,500
2009–10	Czech First League	05–10–2009	Synot Tip Arena	0–1	19,370	12–04–2010	Generali Arena	1–0	18,639
2010–11	Czech First League	20–09–2010	Synot Tip Arena	1–2	15,142	11–04–2011	Generali Arena	1–0	18,873
2011–12	Czech First League	24–03–2012	Synot Tip Arena	1–1	16,516	26–09–2011	Generali Arena	3–0	18,299
2012–13	Czech First League	29–09–2012	Eden Arena	1–0	15,654	13–04–2013	Generali Arena	3–1	19,410
2013–14	Czech First League	28–09–2013	Eden Arena	0–2	15,884	12–04–2014	Generali Arena	3–0	19,089
2014–15	Czech First League	27–09–2014	Eden Arena	0–2	16,661	11–04–2015	Generali Arena	2–1	18,665
2015–16	Czech First League	27–09–2015	Eden Arena	1–0	17,663	20–03–2016	Generali Arena	3–1	18,964
2016–17	Czech First League	02–04–2017	Eden Arena	1–1	19,084	25–09–2016	Generali Arena	0–2	18,397
2017–18	Czech First League	17–09–2017	Eden Arena	2–0	19,084	17–03–2018	Generali Arena	3–3	17,034
2018–19	Czech First League	14–04–2019	Sinobo Stadium	1–1	19,370	04–11–2018	Generali Arena	2–2	17,398
2018–19	Czech First League	26–05–2019	Sinobo Stadium	2–1	17,986				
2019–20	Czech First League	08–03–2020	Sinobo Stadium	1–1	19,370	22–09–2019	Generali Arena	0–3	17,292
2019–20	Czech First League	08–07–2020	Sinobo Stadium	0–0	0				
2020–21	Czech First League	11–04–2021	Sinobo Stadium	2–0	0	06–12–2020	Generali Arena	0–3	0
2021–22	Czech First League	06–03–2022	Sinobo Stadium	2–0	19,370	03–10–2021	Generali Arena	1–0	17,093
2021–22	Czech First League	15–05–2022	Sinobo Stadium	1–2	18,131				
2022–23	Czech First League	23–10–2022	Fortuna Arena	4–0	19,370	15–04–2023	epet ARENA	3–3	18,305
2022–23	Czech First League					13–05–2023	epet ARENA	3–2	18,113
2023–24	Czech First League	24–09–2023	Fortuna Arena	1–1	19,370	02–03–2024	epet ARENA	0–0	18,283
2023–24	Czech First League					11–05–2024	epet ARENA	0–0	18,199
2024–25	Czech First League	06–10–2024	Fortuna Arena	2–1	19,308	08–03–2025	epet ARENA	2–0	18,207
2024–25	Czech First League	10–05–2025	Fortuna Arena	2–1	19,048				
2025–26	Czech First League	08–03–2026	Fortuna Arena	3–1		05–10–2025	epet ARENA	1–1	
2025–26	Czech First League	09–05–2026	Fortuna Arena	(Note: Match was abandoned at 3–2 to Slavia Prague in stoppage time after Slavia fans stormed the pitch.)					

=== Cup ===
Season	Date	Venue	Matches			Competition	Attendance
Season	Date	Venue	Team 1	Score	Team 2	Competition	Attendance
1988–89	28 May 1989	Stadion Střelnice, Jablonec	Sparta	1–0	Slavia	Czechoslovak Cup Czech Final	9,700
1992–93	14 April 1993	Strahov Stadium	Slavia	0–2	Sparta	Czechoslovak Cup Quarter Final	
1995–96	8 May 1996	Letná Stadium	Sparta	2–0	Slavia	Czech Cup Last 16	10,602
1998–99	4 May 1999	Letná Stadium	Sparta	0–1	Slavia	Czech Cup Semi-Final	6,432
2001–02	13 May 2002	Strahov Stadium	Sparta	1–2	Slavia	Czech Cup Final	8,820
2009–10	1 April 2010	Synot Tip Aréna	Slavia	1–0	Sparta	Czech Cup Semi-Final 1st leg	7,439
2009–10	15 April 2010	Generali Arena	Sparta	0–1	Slavia	Czech Cup Semi-Final 2nd leg	10,577
2018–19	24 April 2019	Sinobo Stadium	Slavia	3–0	Sparta	Czech Cup Semi-Final	16,246
2020–21	5 May 2021	Generali Arena	Sparta	0–3	Slavia	Czech Cup Semi-Final	0
2021–22	9 February 2022	Sinobo Stadium	Slavia	0–2	Sparta	Czech Cup Quarter-Final	1,000
2022–23	3 May 2023	epet ARENA	Sparta	0–2	Slavia	Czech Cup Final	17,037
2023–24	28 February 2024	Fortuna Arena	Slavia	2–3	Sparta	Czech Cup Quarter-Final	19 223

=== Goalscorers ===
Top goal scorers since 1998–99 season

Player	Club	League	Cup	Total
Milan Skoda	Slavia	6	-	6
Tomáš Souček	Slavia	4	2	6
David Lafata	Sparta	5	-	5
Pavel Horváth	Sparta / Slavia	2 / 1	-	3
Jiří Jarošík	Sparta	3	-	3
Václav Kadlec	Sparta	3	-	3
Martin Latka	Slavia	3	-	3

== Head-to-head ranking league ==
P.	25	26	27	28	29	30	31	32	33	34	35	36	37	38	39	40	41	42	43	44	46	47	48	49	50	51	52	53	54	55	56	58	59	60	61	62	63	64	65	66	67	68	69	70	71	72	73	74	75	76	77	78	79	80
1	1	1	1		1	1	1	1	1	1	1	1	1	1	1	1	1	1	1	1	W	1	1				1		1										1		1													
2	2	2	2	2		2	2	2	2	2	2	2	2	2	2	2			2	2	RU	2	2	2	2	2		2				2								2														
3				3	3																									3	3		3						3				3	3				3		3	3			
4																	4							4																					4							4		
5																														5		5			5					5									5				5	
6																																						6								6								
7																		7							7				7												7	7				7							7	
8																												8														8						8						
9																																					9																	9
10																															10		10																					10
11																										11								11									11				11							
12																																		12		12									12									
13																																												13							13			
14																																			14		14										14					14		
15																																																	15					
16																																																						

P.	81	82	83	84	85	86	87	88	89	90	91	92	93	94	95	96	97	98	99	00	01	02	03	04	05	06	07	08	09	10	11	12	13	14	15	16	17	18	19	20	21	22	23	24	25
1				1	1		1	1	1	1	1		1	1	1	1	1	1	1	1	1		1		1		1	1	1	1				1			1		1	1	1		1	1	1
2						2						2	2	2	2		2	2		2	2	2	2	2	2		2	2	2		2	2	2		2	2		2			2	2	2	2	
3			3		3														3							3											3		3	3		3			
4	4								4			4				4								4																					4
5																						5				5										5		5							
6		6	6			6		6																																					
7	7	7					7																							7			7												
8																																													
9											9																				9														
10										10																																			
11																																			11										
12				12																												12													
13																																		13											
14																																													
15																																													
16																																													
