= Pavel Nedvěd =

Czech footballer (born 1972)

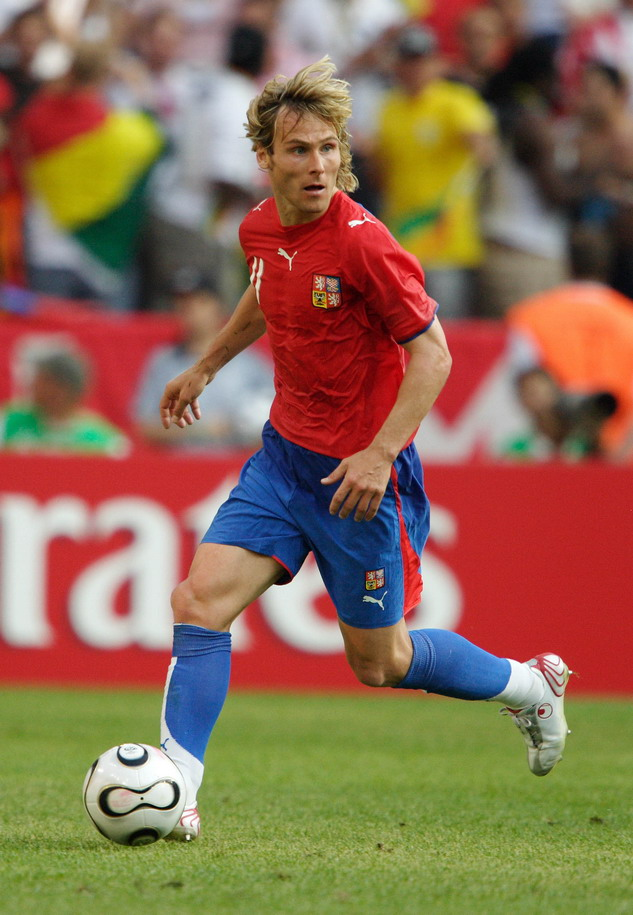
- Nedvěd playing for the Czech Republic at the 2006 FIFA World Cup

Personal information
- Full name: Pavel Nedvěd
- Date of birth: 30 August 1972 (age 54)
- Place of birth: Cheb, Czechoslovakia
- Height: 1.77 m (5 ft 10 in)
- Position: Midfielder

Team information
- Current team: Al Shabab (sporting director)

Youth career
- 1977–1985: TJ Skalná
- 1985–1986: RH Cheb
- 1986–1990: Škoda Plzeň

Senior career*
Years	Team	Apps	(Gls)
1990–1992	Škoda Plzeň	0	(0)
1990–1992	→ Dukla Prague (loan)	19	(3)
1992–1996	Sparta Prague	97	(23)
1996	1.FC Košice	0	(0)
1996–2001	Lazio	138	(33)
2001–2009	Juventus	247	(51)
Total		501	(110)

International career
1992–1993	Czechoslovakia U21	7	(0)
1994–2006	Czech Republic	91	(18)
Medal record
Men's football
Representing Czech Republic
UEFA European Championship
Runner-up	1996 England
FIFA Confederations Cup
Third place	1997 Saudi Arabia
- * Club domestic league appearances and goals

Pavel Nedvěd (Czech pronunciation: [ˈpavɛl ˈnɛdvjɛt]; born 30 August 1972) is a Czech former professional footballer who played as a midfielder. He is widely regarded as one of the greatest Czech players of all time.

Nedvěd won numerous trophies with Italian clubs Lazio and Juventus, including the last ever Cup Winners' Cup with Lazio. He also led Juventus to the 2003 UEFA Champions League final.

Nedvěd was a vital player in the Czech team that reached the final of Euro 1996, after which he attracted the attention of big European clubs. He also captained the team at UEFA Euro 2004, where they were defeated in the semi-final by eventual champions Greece, and where Nedvěd was named in the Team of the Tournament. He helped his team qualify for the 2006 FIFA World Cup for the first time since the breakup of Czechoslovakia. Due to his quick and energetic runs during matches, Nedvěd was nicknamed "Furia Ceca" (lit. 'Czech Fury') by Italian football fans. His nickname in Czech is Méďa (lit. 'Little Bear'), stemming from the similarity between his surname and the Czech word for bear, medvěd.

Nedvěd won the Ballon d'Or in 2003, becoming the second Czech player to win the award after Josef Masopust, and the first since the breakup of Czechoslovakia. During his career, Nedvěd received many other individual awards, including the second Golden Foot award for best footballer worldwide in 2004; the Czech Football Association's Czech Footballer of the Year four times; and the Czech Sports Journalists' Golden Ball for best Czech footballer six times. He was also named by Pelé as one of the FIFA 100 and was named in the UEFA Team of the Year in 2003, 2004, and 2005. Nedvěd retired from professional football after the 2008–09 season. Nedvěd played 501 league matches at club level, scoring 110 goals, and was capped 91 times for the Czech Republic, scoring 18 goals.

== Club career ==
=== Škoda Plzeň and Dukla Prague loan spell ===
Born on 30 August 1972 in Cheb and raised in nearby Skalná, Nedvěd began his football career in his native Czechoslovakia. A football fan from an early age, he began playing for his hometown club Tatran Skalná in 1977 at the age of five. Nedvěd moved on to Rudá Hvězda Cheb in 1985, playing one season before spending five years with Škoda Plzeň. In 1990, Nedvěd was loaned to Dukla Prague, a club run by the Army, as part of his military service. During his first year at Dukla Prague, he played for VTJ Dukla Tábor, a lower division club also operated by the Army. On 28 October 1991, Nedvěd played his first match for Dukla Prague. He played one season for Dukla in 1991 before finishing his military service, thus ending his loan from Plzeň. He later transferred to Sparta Prague in 1992. Plzeň was about to receive 30% of the transfer fee if Nedvěd transferred to a foreign club.

=== Sparta Prague ===
Early in his career at Sparta, Nedvěd was sent off three times in just six matches. With Sparta, Nedvěd won one Czechoslovak First League title, two Gambrinus liga titles and a Czech Cup. In 1994, he received his first call up to the Czech Republic national team. His performance at UEFA Euro 1996, including a goal in the group stage against Italy, attracted attention; despite a verbal agreement with PSV, Nedvěd moved from Sparta Prague to Italian Serie A club Lazio. Sparta first sold Nedvěd to Slovak club 1. FC Košice, which had the same owner as Sparta, for a 1.5 million CZK transfer fee. Immediately, Košice sold Nedvěd to Lazio. Thus Sparta paid only a small fraction of the transfer fee to Plzeň. After Plzeň's protest, the Czech football association ordered Sparta to pay Plzeň 35 million CZK in compensation.

Nedvěd signed a four-year contract for a fee of ₤1.2 million.

=== Lazio ===
Nedvěd made his league debut for Lazio on 7 September 1996 in a 1–0 away defeat against Bologna. He scored his first league goal for the club against Cagliari on 20 October 1996, finishing the 1996–97 season with seven goals. Nedvěd became an integral part of the side, scoring four goals in three matches early in the 1997–98 season. The club had a 24-match unbeaten streak from November 1997 to April 1998, ending with a league match against Juventus in which Nedvěd was sent off. That season, Lazio won the 1997–98 Coppa Italia and reached the final of the 1997–98 UEFA Cup. Nedvěd and Lazio began the 1998–99 season with a victory in the Supercoppa Italiana, Nedvěd scoring as the club defeated Juventus 2–1. He played a role in Lazio's road to the last-ever Cup Winners' Cup, scoring against Lausanne in the first round and in both legs of Lazio's 7–0 aggregate quarter-final victory over Panionios. In the 1999 UEFA Cup Winners' Cup final, Nedvěd scored the decisive goal against Mallorca for Lazio's 2–1 victory. This proved to be the last goal of the tournament, which was later discontinued.

Nedvěd was one of the ten highest-paid footballers in the Italian league in 1999. at a time when the players of the Italian league were the highest paid players in Europe. He played in the 1999 UEFA Super Cup against Manchester United at the beginning of the season, where Lazio won the match by a single goal. The club went on to win the Serie A title and Coppa Italia, completing a domestic double in 2000 with Nedvěd's help. In 2000, he won the Supercoppa Italiana with Lazio for a second time. With Siniša Mihajlović, Nedvěd was one of two Lazio players sent off in the quarter-final of the 2000 Coppa Italia held in December, where the defending champions lost 5–3 on aggregate to Udinese.

Nedvěd played UEFA Champions League football with Lazio, scoring against Real Madrid in a 2–2 draw in the second group stage before the Italian side was eliminated. In Lazio's final Champions League match of the season, Nedvěd was criticised by Leeds United manager David O'Leary for a challenge on Alan Maybury (although the referee did not call a foul), and he received a three-match suspension from European competitions from UEFA.

Despite Nedvěd's signing a new four-year contract with Lazio in April 2001, the club tried to sell him and teammate Juan Sebastián Verón that summer, triggering fan protests against club chairman Sergio Cragnotti. The players were ultimately sold to Juventus and Manchester United respectively.

=== Juventus ===
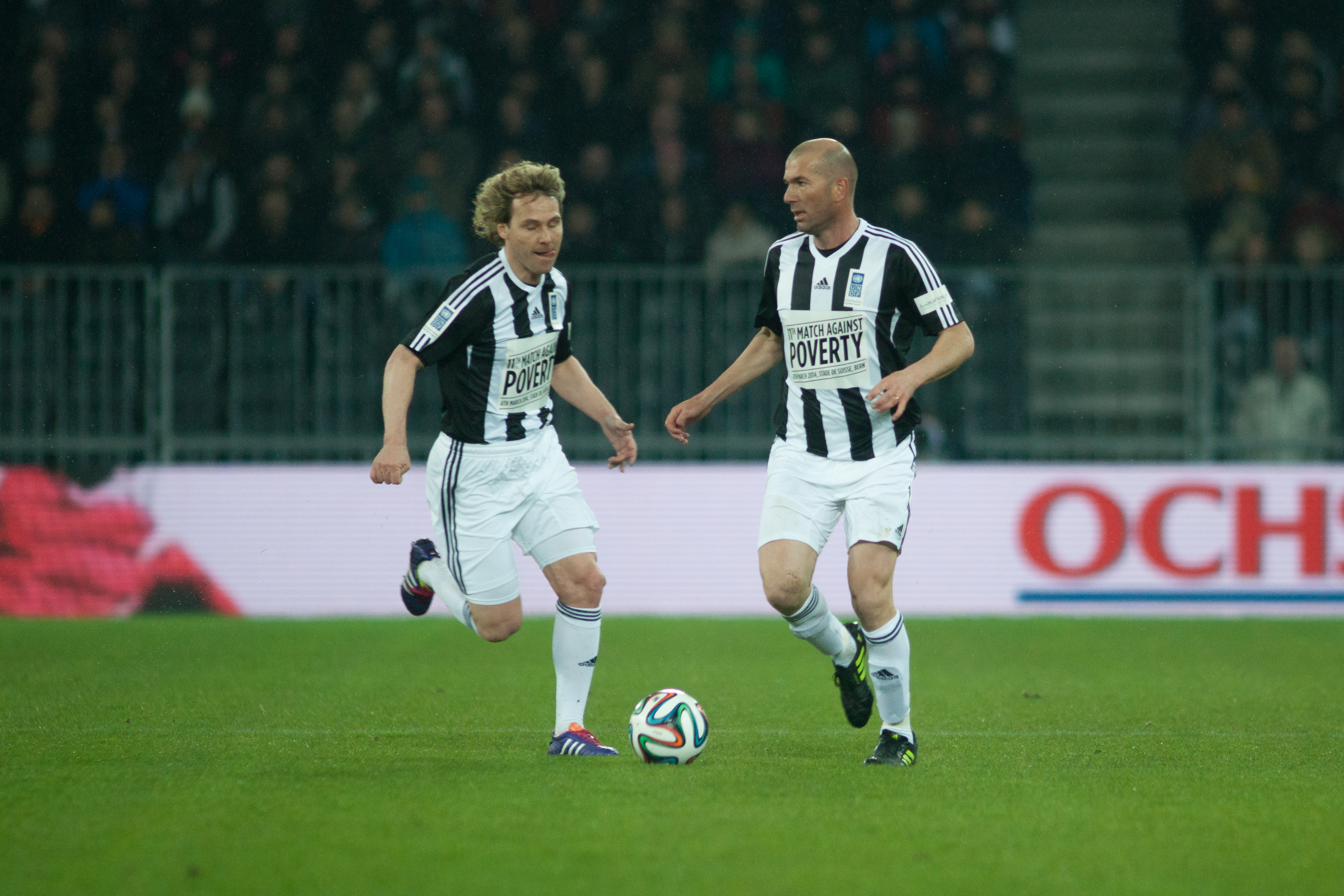
Nedvěd (left) was signed by Juventus in 2001 to replace Zinedine Zidane.

After five seasons with Lazio, Nedvěd was speculatively linked to several clubs (including Manchester United and Chelsea) before moving to Juventus in July 2001 for 75 billion lire (€38.7 million by fixed exchange rate). At Juventus, he replaced Zinedine Zidane, who had transferred to Real Madrid that summer. Nedvěd was a regular on Juventus' 2001–02 and 2002–03 Scudetto-winning teams. Although he was a substantial part of the club's championship season in 2003, he was also the subject of controversy. Nedvěd quit the Italian Footballers' Association in protest of the union's limit on non-European Union (EU) players; his native Czech Republic did not become an EU member until 2004. Nedvěd perfectly led Juventus to the 2003 UEFA Champions League final against Milan, but had to sit out the final due to an accumulation of yellow cards after his semi-final booking for a foul on Real Madrid midfielder Steve McManaman.

In December 2003, Nedvěd was named World Footballer of the Year by World Soccer magazine. Later that month, he won the European Footballer of the Year award over Thierry Henry and Paolo Maldini, the second Czech to win the award after Josef Masopust in 1962. Nedvěd received further recognition in his home country when he won the 2004 Golden Ball, awarded by Czech sportswriters, for the fifth time in seven years.

The 2004–05 season was frustrating for Nedvěd, who was sidelined for two months by knee and head injuries and first considered retirement in April 2005. Although Juventus won Serie A titles that year and in 2006, the titles were revoked after the Calciopoli match fixing scandal. After the 2005–06 season, which ended with Juventus' relegation from Serie A despite its first-place finish, many stars (such as Fabio Cannavaro and Lilian Thuram) left the club and the remaining players' future was uncertain. After the 2006 World Cup, Nedvěd dispelled rumours about his departure by reiterating his desire to help Juventus regain promotion to Serie A, citing his family and his commitment to the club as reasons for his decision. He received a five-match ban after a red card against Genoa in December 2006, and repeated his threat to retire. However, he remained with the club until the end of the season and scored 11 league goals in the 2006–07 Serie B.

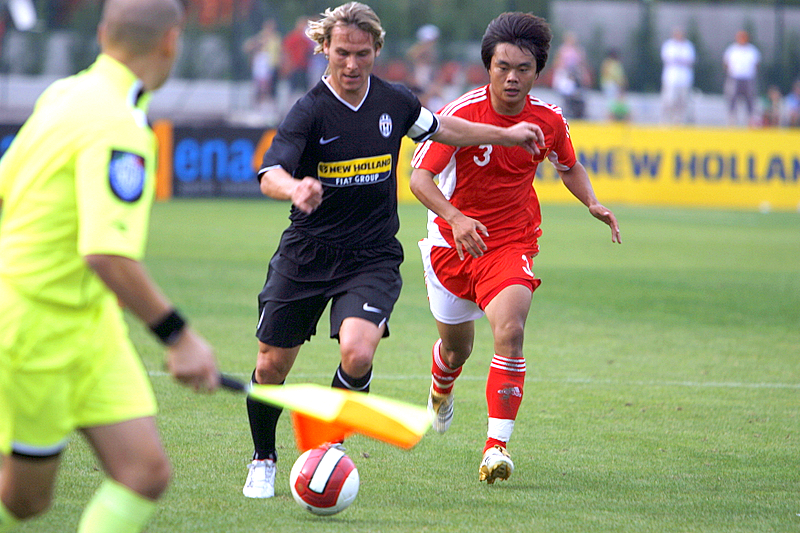
Nedvěd playing for Juventus in training, July 2007

For the 2007–08 season, Juventus again played in Serie A. Nedvěd played frequently for the Bianconeri, contributing as the team's first-choice left winger and scoring two goals that season. He was again controversial: in November 2007, his tackle of Inter Milan midfielder Luís Figo broke Figo's fibula. In April 2008, Nedvěd was hospitalised overnight for a concussion sustained in a collision with Roberto Guana during a match against Palermo.

Nedvěd scored Juventus' first league goal of the 2008–09 season in a 1–1 away draw with Fiorentina, and scored twice against Bologna in a 2–1 away win in October. On 26 February 2009, Nedvěd announced he would retire at the end of 2008–09 season to spend more time with his family. On 10 March 2009, he came off as a substitute due to injury after 12 minutes of the Champions League round of 16 second leg match against Chelsea. Due to his impending retirement and his club's 3–2 loss on aggregate, it was his last European match for Juventus. Nedvěd retired at the end of the season, captaining the final match against his former team Lazio and setting up Vincenzo Iaquinta's goal for a 2–0 victory. As of April 2024, Nedvěd has made the most appearances for the Turin side as a non–Italian player (327).

=== FK Skalná ===
On 23 September 2017, Nedvěd transferred to FK Skalná, based in his native village of Skalná. The club plays in the 1. B class of in the Karlovy Vary Region (7th level of Czech football hierarchy). Chairman of the club had said: "It was Pavel's dream to play with his son and now it will come true". He further added that it seems likely that his planned fielding on 2 June 2018 in a home fixture against TJ Baník Královské Poříči B is a one-off event, due to Nědved's residency in Italy and employment as vice-president of Juventus. Nedvěd was in the starting line-up, but Skalná lost the home fixture 1–4, and neither Nedvěd nor his son scored a goal.

== International career ==
Nedvěd began playing for Czechoslovakia national youth teams in 1988, representing his country in the under-15 age group before progressing to 16, 17 and 18. In 1992, he debuted for the under-21 team, playing seven times between 1992 and 1993.

Nedvěd debuted for the reformed Czech Republic national team in June 1994 in a 3–1 victory over the Republic of Ireland. His first major tournament was Euro 1996, where he scored his first senior international goal and helped his team reach the final.

=== Euro 1996 ===
The Czech Republic were not expected to make an impact against the favoured Germany side in their opening match; Nedvěd missed two scoring chances and was one of ten players to receive a yellow card as Germany won 2–0. However, he contributed defensively, clearing a goal-bound shot from Christian Ziege off the line.

Nedvěd scored his first senior international goal in his nation's Group C match against Italy, putting the Czech Republic in the lead 1–0 after four minutes. Although Italy scored an equaliser during the first half, they were reduced to ten men and the Czech Republic scored again before half-time for a 2–1 victory. Nedvěd played in the third group match, against Russia, receiving his second yellow card of the tournament as the Czechs tied 3–3 to advance to the knockout stage.

Due to a suspension, Nedvěd missed the Czech Republic's quarter-final match against Portugal. The Czechs won in his absence and progressed. In the semi-final against France, Nedvěd was named man of the match as the Czech Republic advanced to the final after a penalty shoot–out, where he scored his nation's second penalty shot. He and the Czech Republic team lost 2–1 in the final to Germany, who scored a golden goal.

=== Euro 2000 ===
Before Euro 2000, Nedvěd could not train normally due to an ankle injury. The Czechs' first match (against the Netherlands) saw him and international teammate Jan Koller hit the woodwork without scoring, before the Dutch scored a controversial penalty to win 1–0. In the second match, against France, he was fouled, where the resultant Czech penalty was converted by Karel Poborský to even the score at 1–1. Despite two shots on goal, Nedvěd could not beat French goalkeeper Fabien Barthez and France won the match 2–1. Already eliminated after two matches, he played in the third group match, against Denmark; the Czechs achieved a 2–0 victory. After Euro 2000, Nedvěd took over the national team captaincy from Jiří Němec.

=== Euro 2004 ===
Nedvěd was instrumental in the Euro 2004 group stage match against the Netherlands. With two goals down after 19 minutes, he gave a man of the match performance as the Czechs rebounded to win 3–2. Nine players, including Nedvěd, were rested for the group match against Germany, with the Czechs already qualified for the knockout stage. He received a yellow card, upheld on appeal, in the quarter-final match against Denmark. This meant Nedvěd would miss the final if he received another yellow card in the semi-final against Greece. However, Greece defeated the Czechs, and Nedvěd came off as a substitute after a knee injury. After their exit from the tournament, Nedvěd announced his retirement from the national team; he was named to the Team of the Tournament alongside countrymen Petr Čech and Milan Baroš.

=== 2006 World Cup ===
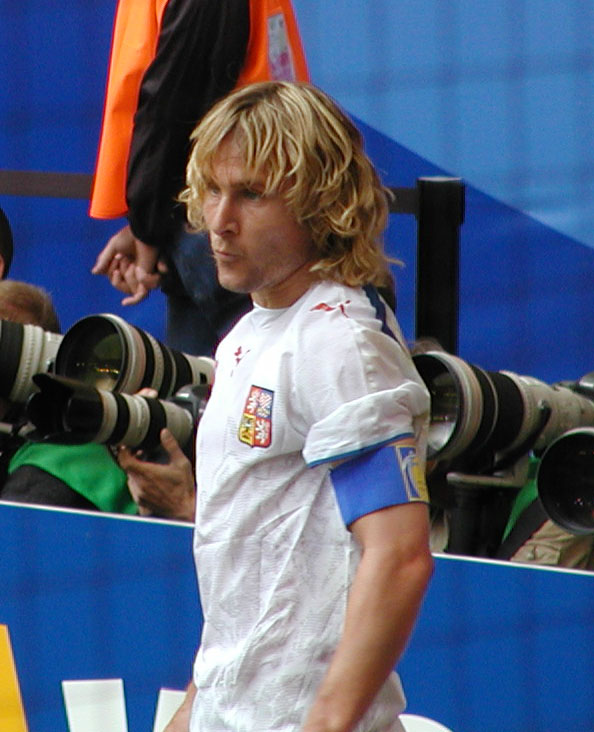
Nedved captaining the Czech team in its final group stage match against Italy

Nedvěd was persuaded by coach Karel Brückner and his teammates to come out of international retirement in time for the 2006 World Cup qualification playoffs against Norway, in which the Czech Republic qualified for the final tournament for the first time since the dissolution of Czechoslovakia. Although Nedvěd's World Cup participation was jeopardised by a June knee injury, he was able to play.

The Czechs won the first match of the 2006 World Cup 3–0 against the United States, but key players were injured. They later lost their next two group matches against Ghana and eventual winners Italy, finishing third in their group. Nedvěd's apparent goal at the beginning of the second half in the match against Ghana was ruled offside. His shots on goal against Italy were saved by Juventus teammate Gianluigi Buffon. Nedvěd again announced his retirement from the international scene before the August 2006 friendly match against Serbia, in which he made his 91st and final appearance. He refused to reverse his decision before Euro 2008 despite requests from teammates and Brückner. In total, Nedvěd made 91 appearances and scored 18 goals.

== Style of play ==
Nedvěd is widely regarded as one of the greatest Czech players of all time. He mainly played as a wide midfielder or as a left-winger due to his crossing ability with his left foot and his ability to cut inside and shoot with his right foot. He also occasionally played as a playmaker due to his passing range and vision. He is also known for his powerful and accurate strikes as well as his explosive pace, the latter of which allowed him to make deep runs from midfield. He was also an accurate free-kick and penalty kick taker.

Nedvěd was known for his trademark long blonde hair, which made him a highly recognisable player on the pitch, and was known for his tackling and work-rate, which allowed him to win possession of the ball and provide stability to the defenders. His former Lazio boss Sven-Göran Eriksson described him as "an atypical midfielder, totally complete". Despite his ability, Nedvěd's tenacious playing style and disciplinary record has been criticised by the football media, who accused him of being overly aggressive in his tackles; he has also been accused of diving.

== Post-playing career ==
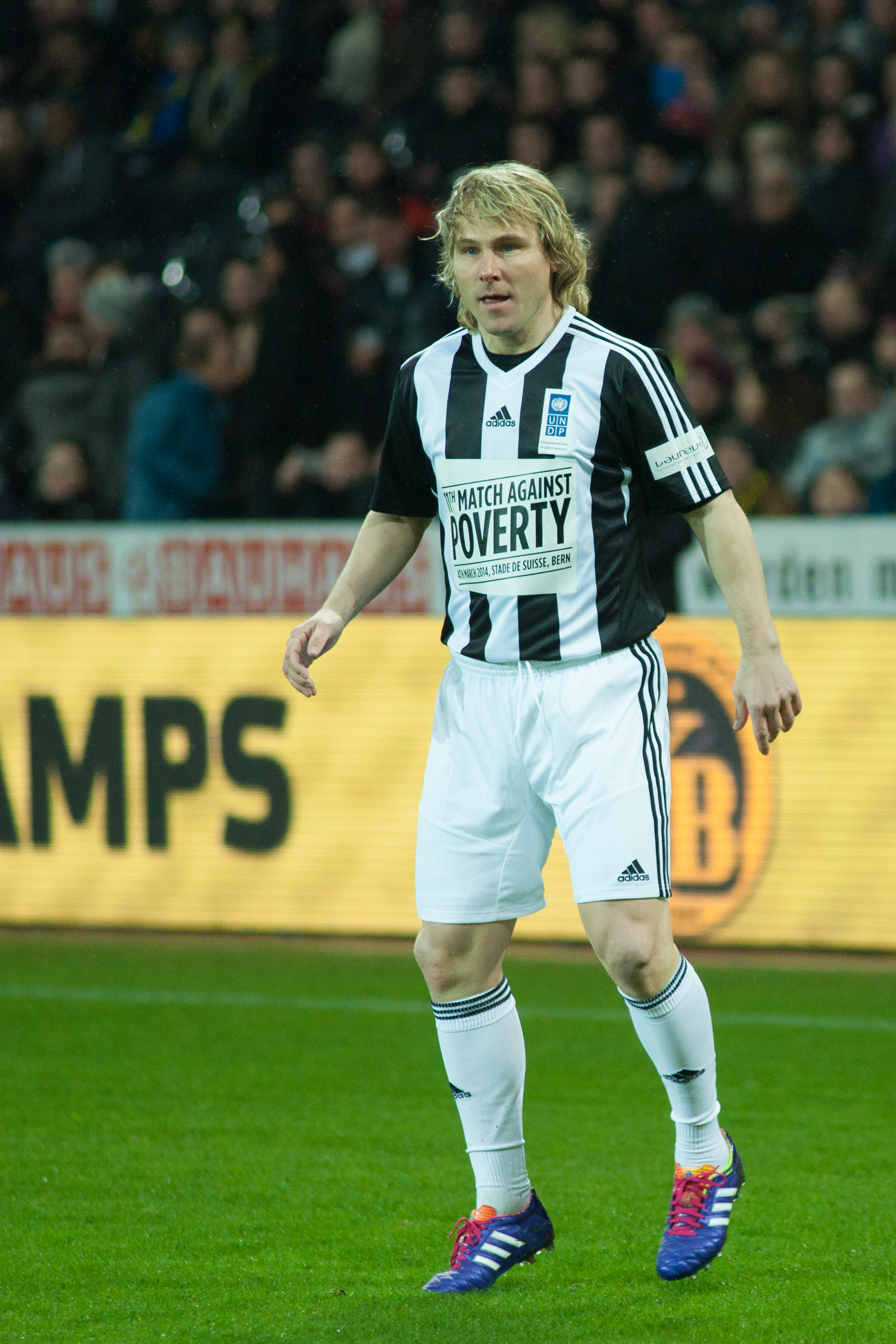
Nedvěd in a 2014 charity match

Nedvěd ran the Prague Half Marathon in 2010 (his first marathon) and finished the course in a time of 1:49:44. He ran the 2012 Prague Marathon in a time of 3:50:02.

Nedvěd was named International Personality at the 2012 FAI International Football Awards in February. In January 2013, he was banned from attending Serie A matches for three weeks after he insulted referee Paolo Valeri during Juventus' match against Sampdoria.

=== Directorship ===
On 12 October 2010, Exor (the Agnelli family's investment company) nominated Nedvěd to be part of Juventus' board of directors. On 23 October 2015, Nedvěd was appointed vice chairman of the board of directors.

On 28 November 2022, the entire Juventus board of directors resigned due to the Plusvalenza scandal, in which Juventus had committed capital gain violations. On 20 January 2023, Nedvěd was suspended from holding office in Italian football for eight months due to his involvement in the scandal.

On 8 January 2025, Nedvěd became sporting director of Saudi club Al Shabab.

As part of business group Fotbal HK 1905, Nedved will take control of the ownership of FC Hradec Králové as of 1 January 2026.

== Personal life ==
Nedvěd started living with his wife Ivana in 1992. The couple have two children who are named Ivana and Pavel after their parents. The couple split in 2019 and Nedvěd started dating an equestrian. Nedvěd's 2010 autobiography was published in Italian as La mia vita normale. Di corsa tra rivoluzione, Europa e Pallone d'oro. It was translated into Czech as Můj obyčejný život and released in the Czech Republic in 2011.

== Career statistics ==
=== Club ===
Sources: League matches, Coppa Italia stats at Juventus, European competition stats

Appearances and goals by club, season and competition
Club	Season	League			National cup (Note: Includes Czech Cup, Coppa Italia)		Europe		Other		Total	
Club	Season	Division	Apps	Goals	Apps	Goals	Apps	Goals	Apps	Goals	Apps	Goals
Dukla Prague	1991–92	Czechoslovak First League	19	3			—		—		19	3
Sparta Prague	1992–93	Czechoslovak First League	17	0			5 (Note: Appearance in UEFA Cup Winners' Cup)	0	—		22	0
Sparta Prague	1993–94	Czech First League	23	3			4 (Note: Appearances in UEFA Champions League)	0	—		27	3
Sparta Prague	1994–95	Czech First League	27	6			2	0	—		29	6
Sparta Prague	1995–96	Czech First League	30	14			8 (Note: Appearances in UEFA Cup)	4	—		38	19
Sparta Prague	Total		97	23			19	5	0	0	116	28
Lazio	1996–97	Serie A	32	7	3	1	3	2	—		38	10
Lazio	1997–98	Serie A	26	11	6	2	11	2	—		43	15
Lazio	1998–99	Serie A	21	1	4	0	8	4	1 (Note: Appearance in Supercoppa Italiana)	1	34	6
Lazio	1999–2000	Serie A	28	5	6	1	12	1	1 (Note: Appearance in UEFA Super Cup)	0	47	7
Lazio	2000–01	Serie A	31	9	3	1	10	3	1	0	45	13
Lazio	Total		138	33	22	5	44	12	3	1	207	51
Juventus	2001–02	Serie A	32	4	4	0	7	0	—		38	10
Juventus	2002–03	Serie A	29	9	1	0	15	5	1	0	43	14
Juventus	2003–04	Serie A	30	6	4	0	6	2	1	0	34	6
Juventus	2004–05	Serie A	27	7	1	0	10	3	—		47	7
Juventus	2005–06	Serie A	33	5	4	0	8	2	1	0	45	13
Juventus	2006–07	Serie B	33	11	3	1	—		—		36	12
Juventus	2007–08	Serie A	31	2	2	1	—		—		33	3
Juventus	2008–09	Serie A	32	7	3	0	9	0	—		44	7
Juventus	Total		247	51	22	2	55	12	3	0	327	65
Career total			501	110	44	7	118	29	6	1	669	147

=== International ===
Appearances and goals by national team and year
National team	Year	Apps	Goals
Czech Republic	1994	1	0
Czech Republic	1995	4	0
Czech Republic	1996	12	2
Czech Republic	1997	10	2
Czech Republic	1998	3	1
Czech Republic	1999	9	2
Czech Republic	2000	10	4
Czech Republic	2001	11	4
Czech Republic	2002	6	0
Czech Republic	2003	8	2
Czech Republic	2004	9	0
Czech Republic	2005	2	0
Czech Republic	2006	6	1
Total		91	18

Scores and results list Czech Republic's goal tally first, score column indicates score after each Nedvěd goal.

List of international goals scored by Pavel Nedvěd
No.	Date	Venue	Opponent	Score	Result	Competition
1	14 June 1996	Anfield, Liverpool, England	Italy	1–0	2–1	UEFA Euro 1996
2	18 September 1996	Na Stínadlech, Teplice, Czech Republic	Malta	2–0	6–0	1998 FIFA World Cup qualification
3	17 December 1997	King Fahd II Stadium, Riyadh, Saudi Arabia	United Arab Emirates	2–0	6–1	1997 FIFA Confederations Cup
4	17 December 1997	King Fahd II Stadium, Riyadh, Saudi Arabia	United Arab Emirates	3–0	6–1	1997 FIFA Confederations Cup
5	14 October 1998	Na Stínadlech, Teplice, Czech Republic	Estonia	1–0	4–1	UEFA Euro 2000 qualifying
6	4 September 1999	Žalgiris Stadium, Vilnius, Lithuania	Lithuania	1–0	4–0	UEFA Euro 2000 qualifying
7	4 September 1999	Žalgiris Stadium, Vilnius, Lithuania	Lithuania	2–0	4–0	UEFA Euro 2000 qualifying
8	26 March 2000	Generali Arena, Prague, Czech Republic	Israel	1–0	4–1	Friendly
9	26 March 2000	Generali Arena, Prague, Czech Republic	Israel	3–0	4–1	Friendly
10	7 October 2000	Na Stínadlech, Teplice, Czech Republic	Iceland	3–0	4–0	2002 FIFA World Cup qualification
11	7 October 2000	Na Stínadlech, Teplice, Czech Republic	Iceland	4–0	4–0	2002 FIFA World Cup qualification
12	24 March 2001	Windsor Park, Belfast, Northern Ireland	Northern Ireland	1–0	1–0	2002 FIFA World Cup qualification
13	15 August 2001	Sportovní areál, Drnovice, Czech Republic	South Korea	1–0	5–0	Friendly
14	6 October 2001	Generali Arena, Prague, Czech Republic	Bulgaria	2–0	6–0	2002 FIFA World Cup qualification
15	6 October 2001	Generali Arena, Prague, Czech Republic	Bulgaria	6–0	6–0	2002 FIFA World Cup qualification
16	2 April 2003	Toyota Arena, Prague, Czech Republic	Austria	1–0	4–0	UEFA Euro 2004 qualifying
17	6 September 2003	Dinamo Stadium, Minsk, Belarus	Belarus	1–1	3–1	UEFA Euro 2004 qualifying
18	6 June 2006	Toyota Arena, Prague, Czech Republic	Trinidad and Tobago	2–0	3–0	Friendly

== Honours ==
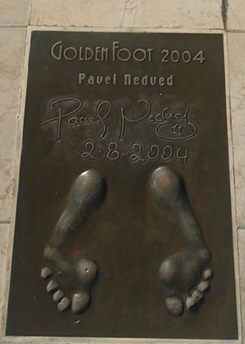
Nedved's Golden Foot.

Sparta Prague

- Czechoslovak First League: 1992–93
- Czech Republic Football League: 1993–94, 1994–95
- Czech Cup: 1995–96

Lazio

- Serie A: 1999–2000
- Coppa Italia: 1997–98, 1999–2000
- Supercoppa Italiana: 1998, 2000
- UEFA Cup Winners' Cup: 1998–99
- UEFA Super Cup: 1999
- UEFA Cup runner-up: 1997–98

Juventus

- Serie A: 2001–02, 2002–03
- Supercoppa Italiana: 2002, 2003
- Serie B: 2006–07
- UEFA Champions League runner-up: 2002–03

Czech Republic

- UEFA European Championship runner-up: 1996

Individual

- Golden Ball (Czech Republic): 1998, 2000, 2001, 2003, 2004, 2009
- Největší Čech (List of Greatest Czechs): 41st place
- Czech Footballer of the Year: 1998, 2000, 2003, 2004
- ESM Team of the Year: 2000–01, 2002–03
- Sportsperson of the Year (Czech Republic): 2003
- Serie A Footballer of the Year: 2003
- Serie A Foreign Footballer of the Year: 2003
- Guerin d'Oro: 2003
- UEFA Club Best Midfielder of the Year: 2002–03
- World Soccer Awards Player of the Year: 2003
- Ballon d'Or: 2003
- RSSSF Player of the Year: 2003
- UEFA Team of the Year: 2003, 2004, 2005
- UEFA European Championship Team of the Tournament: 2004
- Golden Foot: 2004
- FIFA 100: 2004
- FAI International Football Awards – International Personality: 2012
- UEFA Ultimate Team of the Year (substitute; published 2015)
- Juventus Greatest XI of All Time: 2017
- Juventus FC Hall of Fame: 2025
- IFFHS Legends

== Bibliography ==
- Nedvěd, Pavel (2010). La mia vita normale: di corsa tra rivoluzione, Europa, e pallone d'oro (in Italian). Torino: ADD Editore. ISBN 978-8896873090.
- Nedvěd, Pavel; Dalai, Michele (2011). Můj obyčejný život: běh od revoluce do Evropy a ke Zlatému míči (in Czech). Prague: Argo. ISBN 978-80-257-0401-1.
