= Václav Němeček =

Czech footballer

Personal information
- Date of birth: 25 January 1967 (age 59)
- Place of birth: Hradec Králové, Czechoslovakia
- Height: 1.85 m (6 ft 1 in)
- Position: Midfielder

Youth career
- 1977–1985: Spartak Hradec Králové

Senior career*
Years	Team	Apps	(Gls)
1985–1992	Sparta Prague	174	(26)
1992–1995	Toulouse	60	(3)
1995–1997	Servette	13	(2)
1997	Sparta Prague	24	(2)
1998–1999	Dalian Wanda FC	49	(5)
Total		320	(38)

International career
1988–1993	Czechoslovakia	40	(5)
1994–1996	Czech Republic	20	(1)
Medal record
Men's football
Representing Czech Republic
UEFA European Championship
Runner-up	1996 England
- * Club domestic league appearances and goals

Václav Němeček (born 25 January 1967) is a Czech former professional footballer who played as a midfielder. He played for Czechoslovakia and the Czech Republic national teams. As a combined total for them, Němeček played 60 matches and scored six goals. At club level, he played for Sparta Prague, Toulouse, Servette and Dalian Wanda FC.

== Early life ==
Němeček was born in Hradec Králové, and grew up in a nearby village of Libčany.

== Club career ==
=== Sparta Prague ===
Němeček scored 28 goals in 187 appearances for Sparta Prague over two spells, initially between 1985 and 1992 in the Czechoslovak First League, later in the 1997–98 season in the Czech First League. During his first spell with the club, Sparta won the league in five successive seasons between the 1986–87 and 1990–91 seasons. During his time at Sparta Prague, Němeček played in a 3–2 loss against FC Barcelona at the 1991–92 UEFA Cup, and made 10 appearances for the club in the competition, as well as 19 appearances, scoring 2 goals, in the European Cup.

=== Playing abroad ===
Němeček spent three seasons in Toulouse between 1992 and 1995 before joining Servette afterwards. He later played for Chinese side Dalian Wanda FC, winning the 1998 Chinese Jia-A League and reaching the final of the 1997–98 Asian Club Championship with the club.

== International career ==
Němeček played for Czechoslovakia at international level, making his debut for the side in 1988. He participated in the 1990 FIFA World Cup, which was held in Italy. Following the dissolution of Czechoslovakia, Němeček continued to play international football, now with the Czech Republic, being part of the side that finished runners-up at UEFA Euro 1996. That tournament marked the last time he played international football. He played a total of 60 international games, scoring six times across an eight-year period.

== Career after retirement ==
After football, Němeček became a licensed football agent with his former Servette teammate, Walter Fernandez.

== Honours ==
Sparta Prague

- Czechoslovak First League: 1986-87, 1987-88, 1988-89, 1989-90, 1990-91
- Czech First League: 1997–98
- Czechoslovak Cup: 1988, 1989, 1992

Dalian Wanda FC

- Chinese Jia-A League: 1998
