= 1995–96 Czech 2. Liga =

2. česká fotbalová liga
- Season: 1995–1996
- Champions: Karviná
- Promoted: Karviná; Teplice; Bohemians Prague
- Relegated: Turnov; Benešov
- Matches played: 240
- Goals scored: 592 (2.47 per match)
- Top goalscorer: Patrik Holomek (16)
- Average attendance: 1,774

The 1995–96 Czech 2. Liga was the third season of the 2. česká fotbalová liga, the second tier of the Czech football league.

== League standings ==
Pos	Team	Pld	W	D	L	GF	GA	GD	Pts	Promotion or relegation
1	Karviná (C, P)	30	17	6	7	36	18	+18	57	Promotion to 1996–97 1. Liga
2	Teplice (P)	30	16	8	6	41	23	+18	56	Promotion to 1996–97 1. Liga
3	Poštorná	30	15	6	9	50	44	+6	51	
4	Bohemians Prague (P)	30	13	9	8	48	32	+16	48	Promotion to 1996–97 1. Liga (Note: Bohemians were additionally promoted after Union Cheb withdrew from the Czech First League at the end of the 1995–96 season. Poštorná declined the chance to play in the top flight.)
5	Třinec	30	12	12	6	46	33	+13	48	
6	Příbram	30	12	7	11	42	32	+10	43	
7	Slušovice	30	11	9	10	44	38	+6	42	
8	LeRK Brno	30	9	15	6	34	26	+8	42	
9	Chrudim	30	11	7	12	40	38	+2	40	
10	Frýdek-Místek	30	10	8	12	34	36	−2	38	
11	Blšany	30	8	13	9	28	31	−3	37	
12	Havířov	30	7	14	9	40	45	−5	35	
13	Ústí nad Labem	30	7	12	11	39	43	−4	33	
14	Pardubice	30	8	6	16	29	43	−14	30	
15	Turnov (R)	30	5	10	15	23	45	−22	25	Relegation to 1996–97 ČFL
16	Benešov (R)	30	5	6	19	25	62	−37	21	Relegation to 1996–97 ČFL

Source: RSSSF
Rules for classification: 1) points; 2) goal difference; 3) number of goals scored.
(C) Champions; (P) Promoted; (R) Relegated

== Top goalscorers ==
Rank	Scorer	Club	Goals
1	(Czech Republic) Patrik Holomek	Poštorná	16
2	(Czech Republic) Petr Fousek	Bohemians Prague	14
3	(Czech Republic) Luděk Vyskočil	Příbram	12
4	(Czech Republic) Pavel Verbíř	Teplice	11
5	(Czech Republic) Milan Kulyk	Poštorná	9
5	(Czech Republic) Vlastimil Ryšavý	Karviná	9
5	(Czech Republic) Marián Řízek	Ústí nad Labem	9

== See also ==
- 1995–96 Czech First League
- 1995–96 Czech Cup
