= 1994–95 Czech First League =

2nd season of top-tier football league in Czech Republic

Czech First League
- Season: 1994–95
- Champions: Sparta Prague
- Relegated: Bohemians Prague; Švarc Benešov
- Cup Winners' Cup: Hradec Králové
- UEFA Cup: Sparta Prague; Slavia Prague
- Intertoto Cup: Boby Brno
- Matches: 240
- Goals: 600 (2.5 per match)
- Top goalscorer: Radek Drulák (15)
- Biggest home win: Sparta Prague 7–1 Liberec
- Biggest away win: Benešov 0–5 Liberec; Zlín 0–5 Žižkov
- Highest scoring: Sparta Prague 7–2 Plzeň; Ostrava 7–2 Benešov
- Highest attendance: 34,770; Brno 1–2 Slavia Prague
- Lowest attendance: 548; Benešov 3–4 Bohemians Prague
- Average attendance: 5,750

The 1994–95 Czech First League was the second season of top-tier football in the Czech Republic.

== League changes ==
Relegated to the 1994–95 Czech 2. Liga

- Vítkovice

Relegated to the 1994–95 Bohemian Football League

- Dukla Prague

Promoted from the 1993–94 Czech 2. Liga

- Švarc Benešov
- Jablonec

== Stadia and locations ==
Location of clubs in the 1994–95 Czech First League

== League table ==
Pos	Team	Pld	W	D	L	GF	GA	GD	Pts	Qualification or relegation
1	Sparta Prague (C)	30	22	4	4	64	17	+47	70	Qualification for UEFA Cup preliminary round
2	Slavia Prague	30	19	7	4	52	20	+32	64	Qualification for UEFA Cup preliminary round
3	Boby Brno	30	15	9	6	52	27	+25	54	Qualification for Intertoto Cup group stage
4	Slovan Liberec	30	16	3	11	49	46	+3	51	
5	Viktoria Žižkov	30	15	4	11	61	38	+23	49	
6	Drnovice	30	15	3	12	46	44	+2	48	
7	České Budějovice	30	12	10	8	29	28	+1	46	
8	Sigma Olomouc	30	12	7	11	31	31	0	43	
9	Viktoria Plzeň	30	12	4	14	32	37	−5	40	
10	Jablonec	30	11	6	13	37	33	+4	39	
11	Baník Ostrava	30	10	8	12	36	41	−5	38	
12	Hradec Králové	30	10	6	14	35	45	−10	36	Qualification for Cup Winners' Cup qualifying round
13	Union Cheb	30	8	7	15	29	45	−16	31	
14	Svit Zlín	30	8	6	16	21	40	−19	30	
15	Bohemians Prague (R)	30	6	5	19	35	62	−27	23	Relegation to Czech 2. Liga
16	Švarc Benešov (R)	30	3	3	24	23	78	−55	12	Relegation to Czech 2. Liga

Source: Fortuna liga
Rules for classification: 1) points; 2) head-to-head points; 3) head-to-head goal difference; 4) head-to-head goals scored; 5) goal difference; 6) number of goals scored.
(C) Champions; (R) Relegated

== Results ==
Home \ Away	OST	BRN	BOH	ČBU	DRN	HRK	JAB	OLO	SLA	LIB	SPA	BEN	ZLÍ	CHE	PLZ	VŽI
Banik Ostrava		2–2	0–0	2–1	1–3	1–0	2–1	0–1	1–2	2–0	0–1	7–2	0–0	1–1	1–0	1–3
Boby Brno	1–1		3–1	3–0	3–1	0–0	2–0	2–0	1–2	2–2	3–1	4–0	1–0	6–0	2–0	2–0
Bohemians Prague	0–3	1–2		0–0	2–5	1–1	0–3	0–1	1–2	3–4	1–2	5–2	1–0	2–1	3–0	0–4
České Budějovice	0–0	1–1	2–0		2–0	4–0	1–0	1–1	1–1	0–2	1–0	1–1	1–0	0–0	1–0	1–0
Drnovice	2–1	3–3	1–0	3–1		5–2	2–1	2–1	1–2	2–1	0–4	1–3	0–1	5–0	1–0	2–2
Hradec Králové	4–0	0–2	1–1	1–3	0–0		1–1	2–0	0–0	2–0	2–1	5–0	2–0	0–1	2–0	2–1
Jablonec	2–3	1–0	3–1	1–0	3–1	3–0		2–1	0–2	1–1	0–1	2–0	0–0	3–0	1–1	1–1
Sigma Olomouc	1–1	2–1	2–0	1–1	1–0	2–0	1–2		1–1	1–1	1–1	2–1	2–1	2–1	3–0	1–2
Slavia Prague	2–0	3–0	2–1	1–2	2–0	3–1	2–1	0–0		5–0	0–1	2–0	1–0	1–0	2–3	3–2
Slovan Liberec	2–1	2–1	3–1	0–1	1–0	4–2	2–1	2–1	1–0		2–1	4–1	1–0	2–0	1–2	2–1
Sparta Prague	1–0	3–1	3–1	4–0	4–0	3–0	3–0	2–0	0–0	7–1		2–0	3–0	1–1	7–2	3–1
Švarc Benešov	1–2	1–1	3–4	2–1	1–2	0–1	0–0	1–0	1–5	0–5	0–1		0–3	1–2	0–3	0–2
Svit Zlín	0–0	0–2	0–0	0–0	0–1	2–0	2–1	0–1	0–4	2–1	0–1	3–1		3–2	2–1	0–5
Union Cheb	3–0	0–0	2–1	0–2	2–1	1–3	0–2	0–1	0–0	3–1	0–0	4–0	1–1		1–0	1–2
Viktoria Plzeň	0–1	0–1	4–0	0–0	0–1	1–0	1–0	2–0	1–1	2–1	0–1	2–1	2–0	1–0		3–2
Viktoria Žižkov	5–2	0–0	3–4	4–0	0–1	5–1	2–1	2–0	0–0	1–0	0–2	2–0	5–1	3–2	1–1	

Source: Fortuna liga
Legend: Blue = home team win; Yellow = draw; Red = away team win.

== Top goalscorers ==
Rank	Player	Club	Goals
1	(Czech Republic) Radek Drulák	Petra Drnovice	15
2	(Slovakia) Igor Klejch	Svit Zlín	13
3	(Czech Republic) Horst Siegl	Sparta Prague	10
3	(Czech Republic) Josef Obajdin	Slovan Liberec	10
3	(Slovakia) Tibor Jančula	Viktoria Žižkov	10
3	(Czech Republic) Tomáš Krejčík	Viktoria Žižkov	10
3	(Czech Republic) Karel Poborský	Viktoria Žižkov	10
3	(Ukraine) Viktor Dvirnyk	Bohemians Praha	10
3	(Czech Republic) Karel Jarolím	Bohemians Praha	10

== Attendances ==
#	Club	Average	Highest
1	Brno	20,523	34,770
2	Jablonec	7,006	12,637
3	Sparta Praha	6,849	16,380
4	Slovan Liberec	6,193	9,258
5	Slavia Praha	6,095	13,456
6	Bohemians	5,434	11,977
7	Hradec Králové	4,893	22,672
8	Sigma Olomouc	4,717	10,242
9	České Budějovice	4,577	8,396
10	Viktoria Plzeň	4,573	11,550
11	Drnovice	4,194	7,148
12	Zlín	4,088	6,305
13	Viktoria Žižkov	4,076	8,498
14	Benešov	3,095	8,048
15	Cheb	2,887	3,914
16	Ostrava	2,803	5,720

== See also ==
- 1994–95 Czech Cup
- 1994–95 Czech 2. Liga
