= 1994–95 Czech Cup =

Pohár ČMFS

Tournament details
- Country: Czech Republic

Final positions
- Champions: Hradec Králové
- Runners-up: Viktoria Žižkov

Tournament statistics
- Top goal scorer: Karel Poborsky (7)

The 1994–95 Czech Cup was the second edition of the annual football knockout tournament organized by the Czech Football Association of the Czech Republic.

Hradec Králové prevailed at the 14 June 1995 Cup and qualified for the 1995–96 UEFA Cup Winners' Cup.

== Round 3 ==
Team 1	Score	Team 2
Příbram	4–2	České Budějovice
Tatran Poštorná	2–1	Boby Brno
Teplice	0–2	Union Cheb
Znojmo	0–1	Hradec Králové
Karviná	1–0	Baník Havířov
Lokomotiva Kladno	0–0; 3–4 pen	Bohemians Prague
Město Albrechtice	0–3	Baník Ostrava
Dukla Prague	5–0	Český Brod
VP Frýdek-Místek	0–7	Sigma Olomouc
GGS Arma Ústí	0–1	Viktoria Plzeň
Kaučuk Opava	0–0; 2–4 pen	Svit Zlín
Sparta Prague	3–1	Benešov
Chmel Blšany	1–0	Liberec
Sokol Brozany	0–1	Slavia Prague
LeRK Prostějov	0–2	Petra Drnovice
SK Chrudim	0–1	Viktoria Žižkov

== Round 4 ==
Team 1	Score	Team 2
Tatran Poštorná	2–2; 3–1 pen	Sigma Olomouc
Viktoria Plzeň	0–0; 5–3 pen	Union Cheb
Příbram	3–0	Chmel Blšany
Dukla Prague	0–1	Sparta Prague
Svit Zlín	0–1	Petra Drnovice
Hradec Králové	1–0	Slavia Prague
Karviná	1–5	Baník Ostrava
Viktoria Žižkov	4–0	Bohemians Prague

== Quarterfinals ==
The quarterfinals were played on 19 April 1995.

Team 1	Score	Team 2
Příbram	1–1; 4–3 pen	Sparta Prague
Viktoria Žižkov	5–0	Tatran Poštorná
Baník Ostrava	0–2	Hradec Králové
Petra Drnovice	3–2	Viktoria Plzeň

== Semifinals ==
The semifinals were played on 17 May 1995.

Team 1	Score	Team 2
Petra Drnovice	1–1; 3–4 pen	Hradec Králové
Viktoria Žižkov	3–0	Příbram

== Final ==
14 June 1995
16:30 CEST

Hradec Králové	0–0	Viktoria Žižkov
Penalties
	3–1

Stadion Evžena Rošického, Prague
Attendance: 6,000
Referee: Václav Krondl

== See also ==
- 1994–95 Czech First League
- 1994–95 Czech 2. Liga
