= Stanislav Griga =

Slovak footballer (born 1961)

Personal information
- Date of birth: 4 November 1961 (age 64)
- Place of birth: Žilina, Czechoslovakia
- Height: 1.83 m (6 ft 0 in)
- Position: Forward

Youth career
- 1971–1980: Žilina

Senior career*
Years	Team	Apps	(Gls)
1980–1981	Žilina	26	(25)
1981–1986	Sparta Prague	130	(67)
1986–1987	Dukla Prague	15	(11)
1987–1990	Sparta Prague	91	(57)
1990–1992	Feyenoord	43	(9)
1992–1993	Rapid Wien	23	(9)
Total		328	(178)

International career
1983–1990	Czechoslovakia	34	(8)

Managerial career
- 1995–1996: Žilina
- 1996–1998: Dukla Trenčín
- 1998–1999: Slovan Bratislava
- 1999–2002: Slovakia U21
- 2002–2003: Dubnica nad Váhom
- 2004–2005: Slovan Liberec
- 2005–2006: Sparta Prague
- 2007–2008: Viktoria Žižkov
- 2010–2012: Senica
- 2012–2013: Slovakia
- 2015–2016: Zemplín Michalovce
- 2018–2020: Žilina
- 2020: Senica
- * Club domestic league appearances and goals

Stanislav Griga (born 4 November 1961) is a Slovak football manager and a former player. He played 34 matches for Czechoslovakia and scored eight goals.

== Playing career ==
As a player of AC Sparta Prague, Griga played at the 1983 European Super Cup against Real Madrid and was praised by then-coach Alfredo Di Stefano for his performance. He participated at the 1990 FIFA World Cup, and had a headed goal controversially disallowed for offside in a first-round game against Italy at Stadio Olimpico.

== Coaching career ==
Griga was appointed coach of Sparta Prague in October 2005. He stayed with the club until August 2006, finishing with a record of twelve wins, seven draws, and eight losses in his 27 games in charge.

On 26 April 2012, Griga was named as joint coach of the Slovakia national team with Michal Hipp, who has served as interim coach since January that year. In June 2013, they were sacked and replaced by Ján Kozák.

== Personal life ==
In January 2010, 48-year-old Griga married Viera Viskupová, a diplomat at the Slovak Embassy in Prague. He spends his free time playing golf.

== Honours ==
=== Player ===
Sparta Prague

- Czechoslovak First League: 1983–84, 1984–85, 1987–88, 1988–89, 1989–90
- Czechoslovak Cup: 1983–84, 1987–88, 1988–89

Feyenoord

- KNVB Cup: 1990–91, 1991–92
- Dutch Super Cup: 1991
- UEFA Cup Winners' Cup semi-finalist: 1991–92

Czechoslovakia

- FIFA World Cup quarter-finalist: 1990

Individual

- Czechoslovak First League top scorer: 1985–86 (19 goals)

=== Manager ===
MŠK Žilina

- 2. Liga (Slovakia) runner-up: 1995–96 (promoted)

Slovan Bratislava

- Slovak First League: 1998–99
- Slovak Cup: 1998–99

Slovan Liberec

- UEFA Intertoto Cup finalist: 2004

FK Senica

- Slovak First League runner-up: 2010–11
- Slovak Cup runner-up: 2011–12
