= 1993–94 Czech 2. Liga =

2. česká fotbalová liga
- Season: 1993–1994
- Champions: Jablonec
- Promoted: Jablonec; Benešov
- Relegated: Znojmo
- Matches: 240
- Goals: 599 (2.5 per match)
- Top goalscorer: Tibor Mičinec (18)
- Average attendance: 1,396

The 1993–94 Czech 2. Liga was the inaugural season of the 2. česká fotbalová liga, the second tier of the Czech football league following the dissolution of Czechoslovakia. The league was played with 16 teams, although the following season the number was increased to 18 teams, so only one team was relegated at the end of the season, with three teams being promoted from the third tier. Two points were awarded for a win this season, although from the following season this was changed to three points for a win.

== Team changes ==
Of the 16 teams who had competed at the second level of competition the previous season, the top six teams were promoted to the top flight as replacements for the Slovak teams which had left the league. Seventh-placed Jablonec played a two-legged promotion/relegation playoff with Bohemians from the top league, which Bohemians won, resulting in no Czech teams being relegated from the top flight.

Eight out of the ten remaining teams from the previous season stayed at this level, and the last two won a mini-league playoff with two lower teams. They were joined by six new teams who had played the previous season in the third tier of football. These were Blšany, Teplice and Turnov, who had finished in the top three positions of the previous season's Bohemian region competition and Frýdek-Místek, Bohumín and LeRK Brno, who had finished in the top three places of the Moravian–Silesian group.

== League standings ==
Pos	Team	Pld	W	D	L	GF	GA	GD	Pts	Promotion or relegation
1	Jablonec (C, P)	30	22	7	1	62	17	+45	51	Promotion to 1994–95 1. Liga
2	Benešov (P)	30	17	10	3	68	26	+42	44	Promotion to 1994–95 1. Liga
3	Opava	30	16	9	5	43	21	+22	41	
4	Třinec	30	13	12	5	48	32	+16	38	
5	Havířov	30	11	12	7	33	32	+1	34	
6	Frýdek-Místek	30	13	7	10	33	29	+4	33	
7	Blšany	30	12	7	11	42	38	+4	31	
8	Teplice	30	10	10	10	37	36	+1	30	
9	Pardubice	30	10	8	12	39	45	−6	28	
10	Turnov	30	9	7	14	29	45	−16	25	
11	LeRK Brno	30	9	6	15	35	41	−6	24	
12	Brandýs	30	7	10	13	20	33	−13	24	
13	Xaverov	30	6	10	14	38	52	−14	22	
14	Kladno	30	7	7	16	24	45	−21	21	
15	Bohumín	30	6	6	18	22	60	−38	18	
16	Znojmo (R)	30	3	10	17	26	47	−21	16	Relegation to 1994–95 MSFL

Source: RSSSF
Rules for classification: 1) points; 2) goal difference; 3) number of goals scored.
(C) Champions; (P) Promoted; (R) Relegated

== Top goalscorers ==
Rank	Scorer	Club	Goals
1	(Czech Republic) Tibor Mičinec	Benešov	18
2	(Czech Republic) Martin Rozhon	Třinec	16
3	(Czech Republic) Pavel Verbíř	Teplice	15
3	(Czech Republic) Luboš Zákostelský	Benešov	15
5	(Czech Republic) Radovan Hromádko	Jablonec	13

== See also ==
- 1993–94 Czech First League
- 1993–94 Czech Cup
