= 1993–94 Czech First League =

1st season of top-tier football league in Czech Republic

Czech First League
- Season: 1993–94
- Champions: Sparta Prague
- Relegated: Vítkovice; Dukla Prague
- Champions League: Sparta Prague
- Cup Winners' Cup: Viktoria Žižkov
- UEFA Cup: Slavia Prague
- Matches: 240
- Goals: 602 (2.51 per match)
- Top goalscorer: Horst Siegl (20 goals)
- Biggest home win: Žižkov 7–0 Dukla Prague
- Biggest away win: Dukla Prague 2–6 Sparta Prague
- Highest scoring: Dukla Prague 2–6 Sparta Prague
- Longest unbeaten run: Union Cheb (15 matches)
- Highest attendance: 23,111; Brno 2–1 Slavia Prague
- Lowest attendance: 459; Dukla Prague 1–1 Olomouc
- Average attendance: 4,663

The 1993–94 Czech First League was the first edition of top flight Czech First League annual football tournament in the Czech Republic following the dissolution of Czechoslovakia on 1 January 1993. The season started on 14 August 1993 and ended on 8 June 1994. It was the last season to award two points for a win before three points for a win was adopted the following season.

Owing to the league reorganisation, the six Slovak clubs in the 1992–93 Czechoslovak First League were replaced by six Czech sides. Among the promoted sides replacing them were winners of the 1992–93 second tier, Viktoria Žižkov.

Sparta Prague topped the league after the opening fixtures of the season, and remained at the top for the whole season. Captain Jozef Chovanec lifted the inaugural championship trophy for Sparta at the end of the season. Sparta Prague striker Horst Siegl scored eight more goals than the league's next-highest scorer, finding the net 20 times in 29 games.

Union Cheb enjoyed a 15-match unbeaten run in the spring part of the season and finished the season in fourth place; their highest-ever finish. Dukla Prague were winless until their 23rd match, setting a league record. They finished bottom of the league and were relegated to the amateur third tier after the season. Vítkovice, who had won the Czechoslovak league just eight years earlier, finished in 15th position and were relegated to the second league.

== Changes from 1992–93 ==
Promoted from the Českomoravská fotbalová liga

- Drnovice
- Slovan Liberec
- Svit Zlín
- Union Cheb
- Viktoria Plzeň
- Viktoria Žižkov

Joined the Slovak Super Liga after the dissolution of Czechoslovakia

- DAC Dunajská Streda
- Inter Bratislava
- Nitra
- Slovan Bratislava
- Spartak Trnava
- Tatran Prešov

== Stadiums and locations ==
Location of clubs in the 1993–94 Czech First League

== League table ==
Pos	Team	Pld	W	D	L	GF	GA	GD	Pts	Qualification or relegation
1	Sparta Prague (C)	30	18	9	3	62	21	+41	45	Qualification for Champions League qualifying round
2	Slavia Prague	30	16	7	7	55	28	+27	39	Qualification for UEFA Cup preliminary round
3	Baník Ostrava	30	14	8	8	52	25	+27	36	
4	Union Cheb	30	13	10	7	31	29	+2	36	
5	Viktoria Plzeň	30	12	11	7	35	23	+12	35	
6	České Budějovice	30	11	13	6	33	31	+2	35	
7	Sigma Olomouc	30	14	6	10	44	29	+15	34	
8	Viktoria Žižkov	30	12	9	9	40	28	+12	33	Qualification for Cup Winners' Cup qualifying round
9	Slovan Liberec	30	11	10	9	36	32	+4	32	
10	Drnovice	30	13	6	11	38	36	+2	32	
11	Svit Zlín	30	10	7	13	37	48	−11	27	
12	Boby Brno	30	10	6	14	38	46	−8	26	
13	Hradec Králové	30	9	6	15	29	40	−11	24	
14	Bohemians Prague	30	8	7	15	29	54	−25	23	
15	Vítkovice (R)	30	3	7	20	22	64	−42	13	Relegation to Czech 2. Liga
16	Dukla Prague (R)	30	1	8	21	21	68	−47	10	Relegation to 1994–95 ČFL

Source: Fortuna liga
Rules for classification: 1) points; 2) head-to-head points; 3) head-to-head goal difference; 4) head-to-head goals scored; 5) goal difference; 6) number of goals scored.
(C) Champions; (R) Relegated

== Results ==
Home \ Away	OST	BRN	BOH	ČBU	DRN	DUK	HRK	OLO	SLA	LIB	SPA	ZLÍ	CHE	PLZ	VŽI	VÍT
Baník Ostrava		4–1	1–1	4–2	0–1	4–1	3–0	1–1	1–2	2–0	1–3	0–0	5–0	2–1	1–0	5–0
Boby Brno	0–1		3–0	1–1	1–2	2–2	2–1	0–1	2–1	1–0	0–2	3–0	0–0	0–1	1–1	1–0
Bohemians Prague	0–2	2–3		1–1	0–1	3–1	2–2	2–1	0–1	2–0	1–1	1–0	1–2	0–0	2–1	1–1
České Budějovice	0–0	3–2	2–0		2–1	1–1	2–1	2–1	1–1	2–1	1–2	1–0	0–0	0–0	1–0	1–0
Drnovice	2–1	2–1	4–1	4–0		4–0	1–0	0–1	2–2	1–0	1–1	1–3	2–1	0–3 (Note: Viktoria Plzeň was awarded 0–3 win against Drnovice after the match was originally finished with 3–0 win for home team.)	0–2	2–0
Dukla Prague	0–3	1–1	1–2	1–2	0–2		1–1	1–1	2–3	0–1	2–6	1–1	1–2	0–0	0–2	1–2
Hradec Králové	1–0	1–0	0–0	1–0	3–1	0–1		1–0	1–0	1–1	0–2	3–0	1–3	1–2	3–2	2–2
Sigma Olomouc	1–1	0–3	5–0	0–0	3–0	1–0	2–0		0–1	1–2	1–0	3–0	1–1	1–0	0–1	3–1
Slavia Prague	1–1	6–0	2–3	1–1	0–0	3–0	4–2	0–2		0–2	1–1	5–0	4–0	0–0	1–0	6–0
Slovan Liberec	0–0	2–1	4–0	3–3	4–2	1–1	1–2	3–2	0–0		2–1	1–1	0–2	0–0	0–0	2–0
Sparta Prague	1–1	5–1	5–0	0–1	0–0	4–0	2–0	2–1	4–1	2–0		3–2	3–0	1–0	0–0	4–0
Svit Zlín	1–4	3–2	4–1	1–0	1–1	3–0	1–0	2–4	0–1	1–0	1–1		0–1	1–0	1–0	4–1
Union Cheb	2–2	1–1	2–0	0–0	2–0	2–1	1–0	0–1	2–0	0–1	0–0	1–1		0–0	1–1	2–1
Viktoria Plzeň	1–0	1–2	3–2	2–2	1–0	3–1	2–0	2–0	0–2	0–0	2–4	4–1	2–0		1–1	2–0
Viktoria Žižkov	1–0	2–1	1–0	1–0	2–0	7–0	1–0	2–2	1–4	3–4	0–0	2–2	0–1	1–1		4–1
Vítkovice	1–3	0–2	0–1	1–1	1–1	1–0	1–1	1–4	1–2	1–1	1–2	3–2	0–2	1–1	0–1	

Source: Fortuna liga
Legend: Blue = home team win; Yellow = draw; Red = away team win.

== Top goalscorers ==
Rank	Player	Club	Goals
1	(Czech Republic) Horst Siegl	Sparta Prague	20
2	(Czech Republic) René Wagner	Boby Brno	12
3	(Czech Republic) Milan Duhan	Baník Ostrava	11
3	(Czech Republic) Josef Obajdin	Slovan Liberec	11
5	(Slovakia) Róbert Kafka	Petra Drnovice	10
5	(Czech Republic) Karel Vácha	České Budějovice	10
7	(Czech Republic) Radek Onderka	Baník Ostrava / Sigma Olomouc	9
7	(Czech Republic) Petr Samec	Union Cheb	9
9	(Czech Republic) Daniel Šmejkal	Viktoria Plzeň	8
9	(Czech Republic) Karel Poborský	České Budějovice	8
9	(Czech Republic) Miroslav Šebesta	Union Cheb	8

== Attendances ==
#	Club	Average	Highest
1	Brno	9,501	23,111
2	Sigma Olomouc	5,807	10,565
3	Viktoria Plzeň	5,774	13,800
4	České Budějovice	5,392	7,304
5	Baník Ostrava	5,391	11,536
6	Sparta Praha	5,232	13,905
7	Slavia Praha	5,222	10,200
8	Zlín	4,885	11,500
9	Slovan Liberec	4,649	5,800
10	Viktoria Žižkov	4,337	6,738
11	Bohemians	3,938	8,675
12	Drnovice	3,928	6,500
13	Cheb	3,451	5,016
14	Hradec Králové	3,404	11,022
15	Vítkovice	2,211	7,650
16	Dukla	1,338	4,861

== See also ==
- 1993–94 Czech Cup
- 1993–94 Czech 2. Liga
