= Milan Frýda =

Czech footballer (born 1965)

Personal information
- Date of birth: 26 August 1965 (age 61)
- Place of birth: Czechoslovakia
- Position: Midfielder

Youth career
- Hradec Králové

Senior career*
Years	Team	Apps	(Gls)
1982–1983	Hradec Králové	3	(0)
1984–1986	Slavia Prague	38	(0)
1986–1988	Hvězda Cheb	38	(4)
1988–1990	Slavia Prague	53	(6)
1990–1992	Lausanne-Sport	55	(2)
1997	Hradec Králové	31	(4)

International career
1991	Czechoslovakia	1	(0)
- * Club domestic league appearances and goals

Milan Frýda (born 26 August 1965) is a Czech former footballer who played as a midfielder.

== Life ==
Frýda was born in 1965 in the Czechoslovakia. He started his career in FC Hradec Králové. He was described as "part of the famous Kliček - Kotal - Frýda backup".

== Career ==
In 1984, Frýda signed for SK Slavia Prague. In 1986, he signed for FK Hvězda Cheb. In 1988, he returned to Slavia Prague. In 1990, he signed for Swiss side FC Lausanne-Sport. He played in the UEFA Cup while playing for the club. In 1997, he returned to Hradec Králové. After retiring from professional football, he worked as a youth manager.
