= Horst Siegl =

Czech footballer (born 1969)

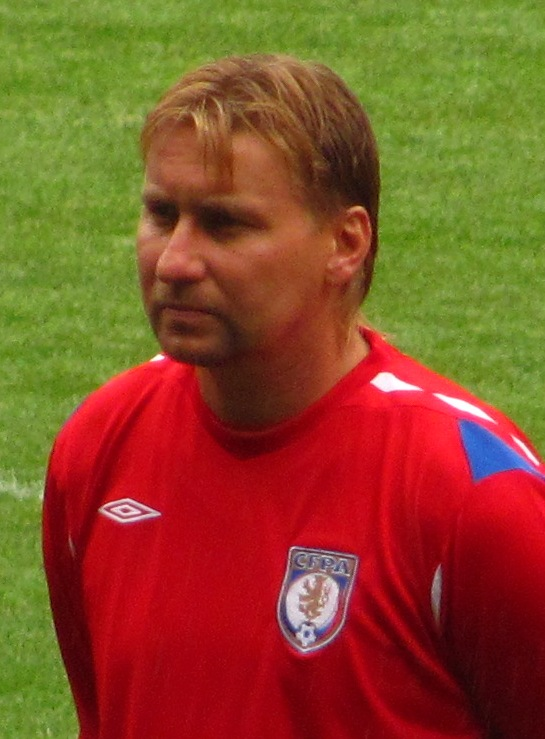
- Siegl in 2011

Personal information
- Date of birth: 15 February 1969 (age 57)
- Place of birth: Abertamy, Czechoslovakia
- Height: 1.86 m (6 ft 1 in)
- Position: Striker

Youth career
- 1978–1987: Slavia Karlovy Vary

Senior career*
Years	Team	Apps	(Gls)
1987–1988	Sparta Prague	7	(1)
1989–1990	RH Cheb	39	(7)
1990–1995	Sparta Prague	138	(66)
1996	1. FC Kaiserslautern	13	(0)
1996–2001	Sparta Prague	120	(61)
2001–2003	Marila Příbram	84	(25)
2004	Viktoria Plzeň	13	(5)
2005–2006	FK SIAD Most	34	(11)
Total		448	(176)

International career
1992	Czechoslovakia	4	(0)
1994–1998	Czech Republic	19	(7)

Managerial career
- 2006–2008: Sparta Prague (Assistant coach)
- 2012–2013: Baniyas (Assistant coach)
- 2014–2015: Slovan Bratislava (Assistant coach)
Medal record
AC Sparta Prague
Winner	Gambrinus liga	1993–94
Winner	Gambrinus liga	1994–95
- * Club domestic league appearances and goals

Horst Siegl (born 15 February 1969) is a Czech former professional footballer who played as a forward. He is among the most successful goalscorers in the history of the Czech First League. He played for Czechoslovakia and later Czech Republic national football teams.

== Biography ==
Born in Abertamy, Siegl belongs to the ethnic German minority, with his family was one of the few people who were not expelled after World War II.

Siegl is a four-time Czech First League top scorer. He played for Czechoslovakia and later the Czech Republic, playing total 23 matches and scoring seven goals. Siegl played two matches for the Czech Republic in the 1997 FIFA Confederations Cup.

In total, Siegl scored 176 league goals in 448 games (265/128 Sparta, 39/7 Cheb, 13/0 1.FC Kaiserslautern, 84/25 Příbram, 13/5 Plzeň, 34/11 Most). With 133 Czech First League goals, Siegl was the competition's record scorer until being passed by David Lafata in March 2014.

== Honours ==
Sparta Prague

- Czechoslovak First League: 1987–88, 1988–89, 1990–91, 1992–93
- Czech First League (7): 1993–94, 1994–95, 1996–97, 1997–98, 1998–99, 1999–00, 2000–01

1. FC Kaiserslautern

- DFB-Pokal: 1995–96

Czech Republic

- FIFA Confederations Cup third place: 1997

Individual

- Czech First League top scorer: 1993–94, 1996–97, 1997–98, 1998–99.
- Czech First League second all-time top scorer
