= Marek Trval =

Czech footballer

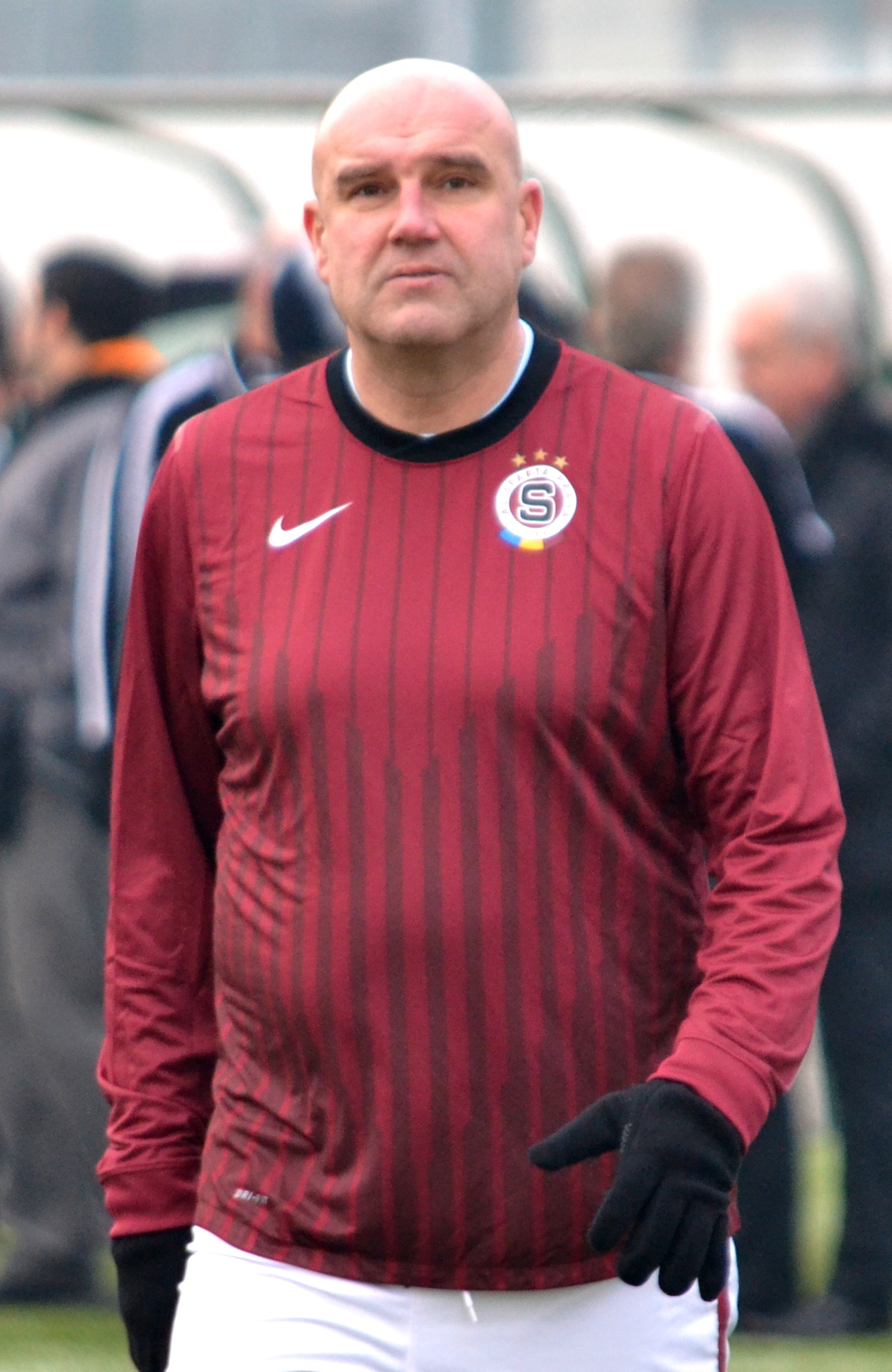
- Trval in 2013

Personal information
- Date of birth: 14 August 1967 (age 59)
- Place of birth: Vítkov, Czechoslovakia
- Position: Midfielder

Senior career*
Years	Team	Apps	(Gls)
1985–1991	TJ Vítkovice		
1992–1993	AC Sparta Prague		
1993–1997	FK Viktoria Žižkov		
1997–1999	AFK Atlantic Lázně Bohdaneč		
1998	→ SK České Budějovice (loan)		
1999–2000	SK Spolana Neratovice		
2000–2001	DAC Dunajská Streda		
- * Club domestic league appearances and goals

Marek Trval (born 14 August 1967) is a retired Czech football midfielder.
