= 1995–96 Czech Cup =

Pohár ČMFS

Tournament details
- Country: Czech Republic

Final positions
- Champions: Sparta Prague
- Runners-up: Petra Drnovice

The 1995–96 Czech Cup was the third edition of the annual football knockout tournament organized by the Czech Football Association of the Czech Republic.

Sparta Prague prevailed at the 22 May 1996 Cup and qualified for the 1996–97 UEFA Cup Winners' Cup.

== Round 3 ==
Team 1	Score	Team 2
Dukla Prague	1–1; 4–2 pen	Viktoria Žižkov
Teplice	4–1	Union Cheb
Pelikán Děčín	2–6	Jablonec
Benešov	2–0	Liberec
Příbram	2–1	České Budějovice
NH Ostrava	0–4	Baník Ostrava
Karviná	4–2	Svit Zlín
Tatran Poštorná	0–0; 1–4 pen	Petra Drnovice
VP Frýdek-Místek	0–1	Kaučuk Opava
LeRK Prostějov	2–2; 5–4 pen	Uherské Hradiště
Uničov	1–1; 3–5 pen	PSJ Motorpal Jihlava
Baník Havířov	0–3	Sigma Olomouc
Admira/Slavoj Prague	2–1	Viktoria Plzeň
Bohemians Prague	0–2	Slavia Prague
SK Chrudim	0–1	Sparta Prague
Lázně Bohdaneč	1–1; 3–1 pen	Hradec Králové

== Round 4 ==
Team 1	Score	Team 2
Dukla Prague	0–1	Teplice
Admira/Slavoj Prague	0–4	Jablonec
Benešov	0–3	Příbram
PSJ Motorpal Jihlava	1–1; 5–4 pen	LeRK Prostějov
Baník Ostrava	1–1; 3–4 pen	Petra Drnovice
Kaučuk Opava	3–0	Sigma Olomouc
Karviná	0–1	Slavia Prague
Lázně Bohdaneč	1–5	Sparta Prague

== Quarterfinals ==
Team 1	Score	Team 2
Kaučuk Opava	0–0; 3–4 pen	Jablonec
Teplice	0–0; 5–4 pen	PSJ Motorpal Jihlava
Petra Drnovice	3–0	Příbram
Sparta Prague	2–0	Slavia Prague

== Semifinals ==
The semifinals were played on 15 May 1996.

Team 1	Score	Team 2
Petra Drnovice	2–1	Jablonec
Teplice	1–4	Sparta Prague

== Final ==
22 May 1996
16:30 CEST

Sparta Prague	4–0	Petra Drnovice
Nedvěd 26', 56'; Svoboda 45'; Kouba 71' (pen.)

Stadion Evžena Rošického, Prague
Attendance: 7,814
Referee: Karel Bohuněk

== See also ==
- 1995–96 Czech First League
- 1995–96 Czech 2. Liga
