= Czech Cup =

Football tournament in the Czech Republic

- Founded: 1993
- Region: Czech Republic
- Teams: 135
- Qualifier for: UEFA Europa League
- Current champions: Karviná (1st title)
- Most championships: Sparta Prague (8 titles)
- Website: molcup.cz
- 2026–27 Czech Cup

The Czech Cup (Czech: Pohár FAČR), officially known as the MOL Cup for sponsorship reasons, is the major men's football cup competition in the Czech Republic. It is organised by the Czech Football Association.

The Czech Cup was first held in 1961. The winner would then face the winner of the Slovak Cup in the Czechoslovak Cup final. This competition was discontinued in 1993, after the dissolution of Czechoslovakia into two independent states (Czech Republic and Slovakia).

The winner gains entry to the following season's UEFA Europa League.

== Finals ==
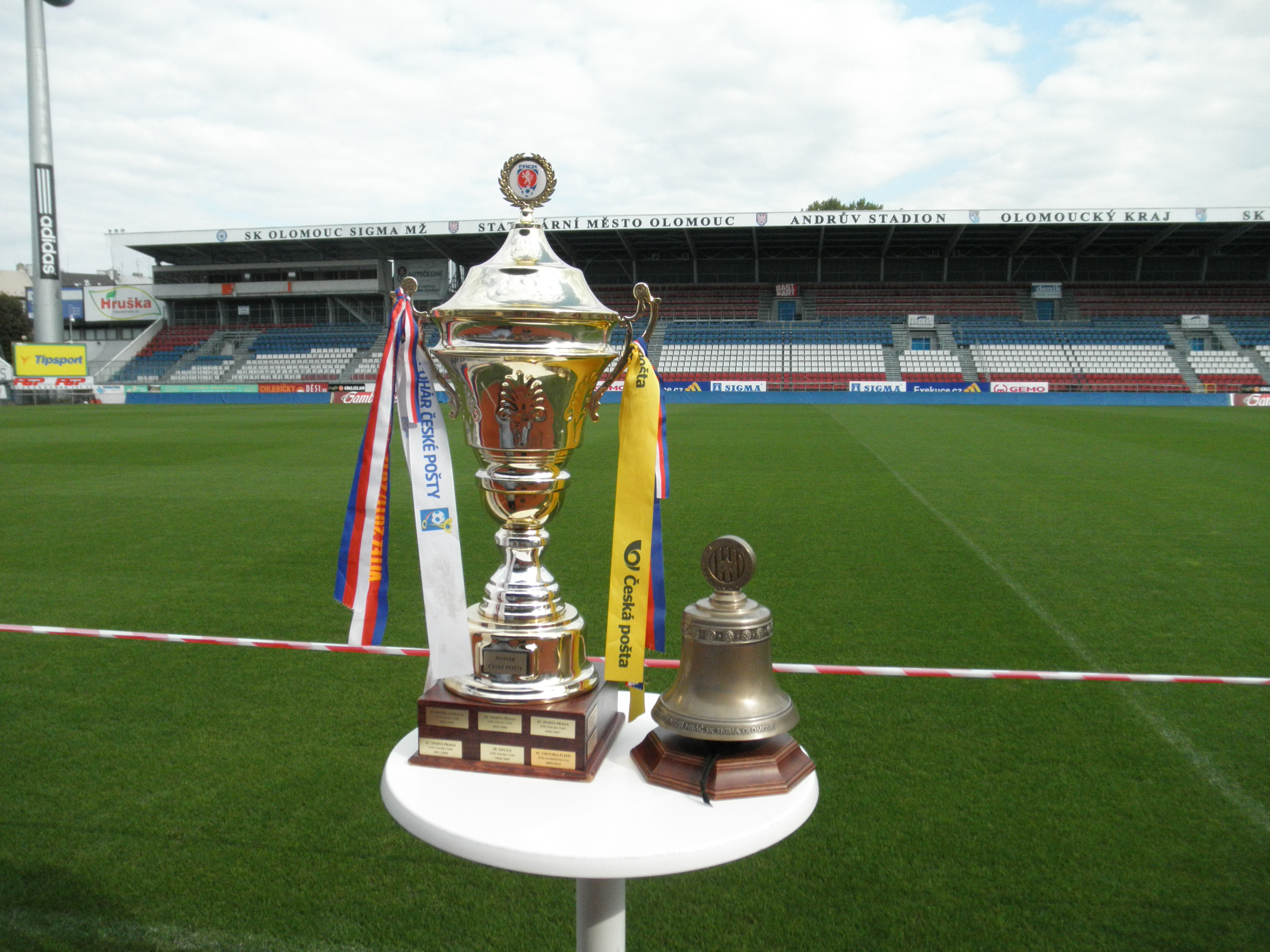
Czech Cup

Year	Date	Winners	Score	Runners-up	Venue
1993–94	13 June 1994	Viktoria Žižkov	2–2 (a.e.t.) (6–5 pen.)	Sparta Prague	Stadion Evžena Rošického, Prague
1994–95	14 June 1995	Hradec Králové	0–0 (a.e.t.) (3–1 pen.)	Viktoria Žižkov	Stadion Evžena Rošického, Prague
1995–96	22 May 1996	Sparta Prague	4–0	Drnovice	Stadion Evžena Rošického, Prague
1996–97	15 June 1997	Slavia Prague	1–0 (a.e.t.)	Příbram	Stadion Evžena Rošického, Prague
1997–98	9 June 1998	Jablonec	2–1 (a.s.d.e.t.)	Drnovice	Stadion Evžena Rošického, Prague
1998–99	25 May 1999	Slavia Prague	1–0 (a.s.d.e.t.)	Slovan Liberec	Stadion Evžena Rošického, Prague
1999–2000	10 May 2000	Slovan Liberec	2–1	Baník Ratíškovice	Stadion Evžena Rošického, Prague
2000–01	28 May 2001	Viktoria Žižkov	2–1 (a.s.d.e.t.)	Sparta Prague	Stadion Evžena Rošického, Prague
2001–02	13 May 2002	Slavia Prague	2–1	Sparta Prague	Stadion Evžena Rošického, Prague
2002–03	27 May 2003	Teplice	1–0	Jablonec	Stadion Evžena Rošického, Prague
2003–04	18 May 2004	Sparta Prague	2–1	Baník Ostrava	Stadion Evžena Rošického, Prague
2004–05	31 May 2005	Baník Ostrava	2–1	Slovácko	Andrův stadion, Olomouc
2005–06	19 May 2006	Sparta Prague	0–0 (4–2 pen.)	Baník Ostrava	Stadion u Nisy, Liberec
2006–07	24 May 2007	Sparta Prague	2–1	Jablonec	Stadion Evžena Rošického, Prague
2007–08	13 May 2008	Sparta Prague	0–0 (4–3 pen.)	Slovan Liberec	Stadion Evžena Rošického, Prague
2008–09	27 May 2009	Teplice	1–0	Slovácko	Stadion Evžena Rošického, Prague
2009–10	18 May 2010	Viktoria Plzeň	2–1	Jablonec	Stadion Letná, Prague
2010–11	25 May 2011	Mladá Boleslav	1–1 (4–3 pen.)	Sigma Olomouc	Stadion v Jiráskově ulici, Jihlava
2011–12	2 May 2012	Sigma Olomouc	1–0	Sparta Prague	Stadion města Plzně, Plzeň
2012–13	17 May 2013	Jablonec	2–2 (5–4 pen.)	Mladá Boleslav	Letní stadion, Chomutov
2013–14	17 May 2014	Sparta Prague	1–1 (8–7 pen.)	Viktoria Plzeň	Eden Arena, Prague
2014–15	27 May 2015	Slovan Liberec	1–1 (3–1 pen.)	Jablonec	Městský stadion, Mladá Boleslav
2015–16	18 May 2016	Mladá Boleslav	2–0	Jablonec	Na Stínadlech, Teplice
2016–17	17 May 2017	Zlín	1–0	Opava	Andrův stadion, Olomouc
2017–18	9 May 2018	Slavia Prague	3–1	Jablonec	Městský stadion, Mladá Boleslav
2018–19	22 May 2019	Slavia Prague	2–0	Baník Ostrava	Andrův stadion, Olomouc
2019–20	1 July 2020	Sparta Prague	2–1	Slovan Liberec	Stadion u Nisy, Liberec
2020–21	20 May 2021	Slavia Prague	1–0	Viktoria Plzeň	Doosan Arena, Plzeň
2021–22	19 May 2022	Slovácko	3–1	Sparta Prague	Městský fotbalový stadion Miroslava Valenty, Uherské Hradiště
2022–23	3 May 2023	Slavia Prague	2–0	Sparta Prague	Stadion Letná, Prague
2023–24	22 May 2024	Sparta Prague	2–1	Viktoria Plzeň	Doosan Arena, Plzeň
2024–25	14 May 2025	Sigma Olomouc	3–1	Sparta Prague	Andrův stadion, Olomouc
2025–26	20 May 2026	Karviná	3–1	Jablonec	Malšovická aréna, Hradec Králové

== Performance by club ==
Club	Winners	Runners-up	Winning years	Runner-up years
Sparta Prague	8	7	1996, 2004, 2006, 2007, 2008, 2014, 2020, 2024	1994, 2001, 2002, 2012, 2022, 2023, 2025
Slavia Prague	7	–	1997, 1999, 2002, 2018, 2019, 2021, 2023	–
Jablonec	2	7	1998, 2013	2003, 2007, 2010, 2015, 2016, 2018, 2026
Slovan Liberec	2	3	2000, 2015	1999, 2008, 2020
Sigma Olomouc	2	1	2012, 2025	2011
Viktoria Žižkov	2	1	1994, 2001	1995
Mladá Boleslav	2	1	2011, 2016	2013
Teplice	2	–	2003, 2009	–
Baník Ostrava	1	3	2005	2004, 2006, 2019
Viktoria Plzeň	1	3	2010	2014, 2021, 2024
Slovácko	1	2	2022	2005, 2009
Hradec Králové	1	–	1995	–
Zlín	1	–	2017	–
Karviná	1	–	2026	–
Drnovice	–	2	–	1996, 1998
Příbram	–	1	–	1997
Baník Ratíškovice	–	1	–	2000
Opava	–	1	–	2017

== Historical names ==
- 2002–2004: Pohár Českomoravského fotbalového svazu (Pohár ČMFS)
- 2004: Volkswagen Cup
- 2004–2009: Pohár ČMFS
- 2009–2012: Ondrášovka Cup
- 2012–2014: Pohár České pošty
- 2014–2015: Pohár Fotbalové asociace České republiky (Pohár FAČR)
- 2015–present: MOL Cup

The competition took the name Volkswagen Cup before the 2004 final, but the sponsor ended its involvement in October of the same calendar year, before the fourth round of the 2004–05 edition. In 2009, the competition became known as the Ondrášovka Cup after title sponsors, water brand Ondrášovka. In 2012, Česká pošta took over sponsorship from Ondrášovka, with the cup resultantly being called Pohár České pošty. In 2015, the cup was renamed the MOL Cup after MOL became title sponsors of the Czech Cup, signing a three-year deal with an option for a further two.

== See also ==
- Czechoslovak Cup
- Czech Women's Cup
