= 1986–87 Czechoslovak First League =

Czechoslovak First League
- Season: 1986–87
- Champions: Sparta Prague
- Relegated: Škoda Plzeň; Dynamo České Budějovice
- European Cup: Sparta Prague
- Cup Winners' Cup: Dunajská Streda
- UEFA Cup: Vítkovice; Bohemians Prague
- Top goalscorer: Václav Daněk (24 goals)

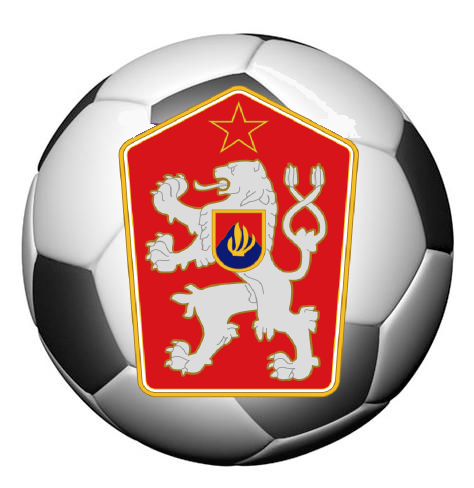

Statistics of Czechoslovak First League in the 1986–87 season.

== Overview ==
It was contested by 16 teams, and Sparta Prague won the championship. Václav Daněk was the league's top scorer with 24 goals.

== Stadia and locations ==
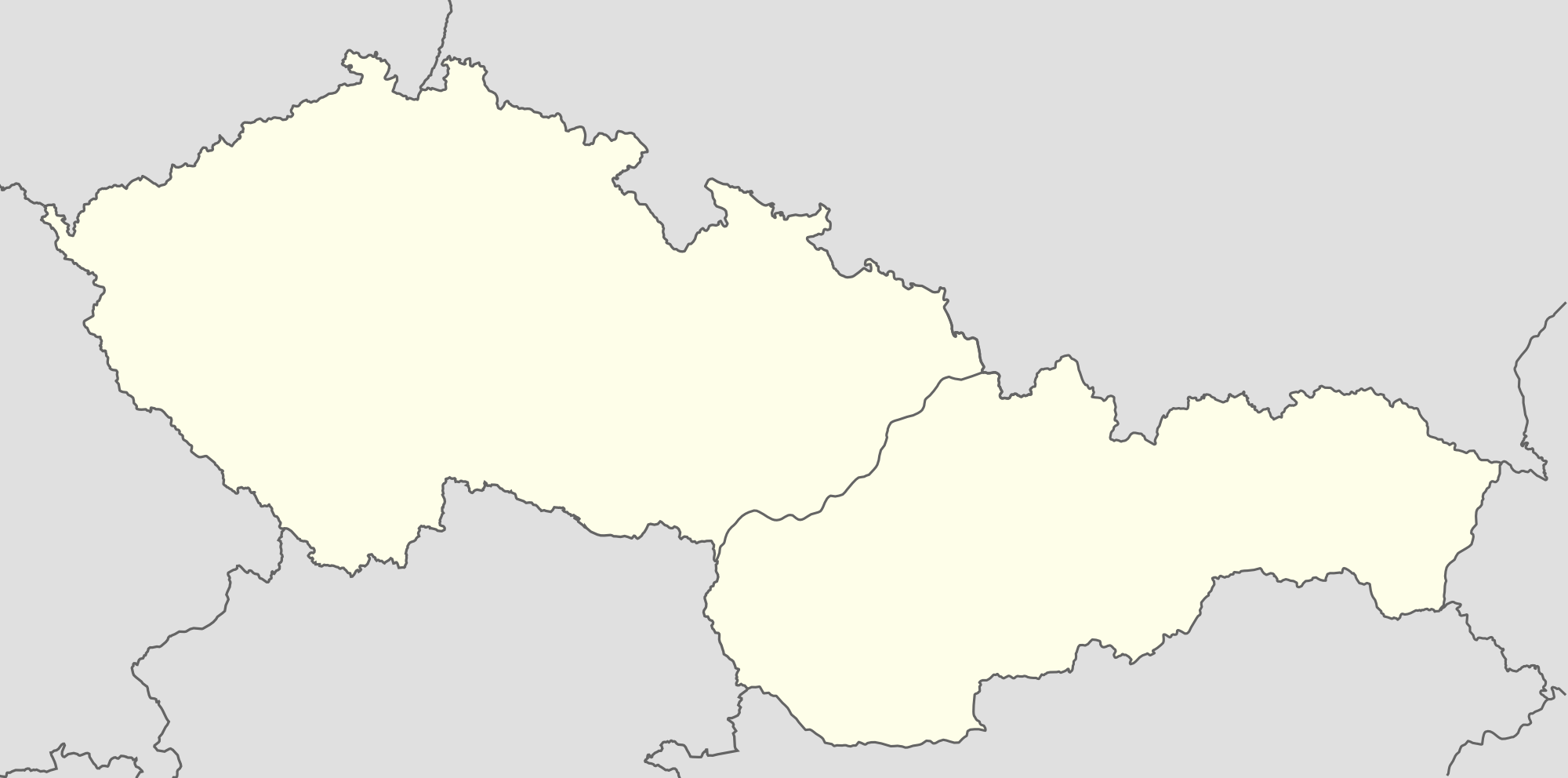
Location of clubs in the 1986–87 Czechoslovak First League

== League standings ==
Pos	Team	Pld	W	D	L	GF	GA	GD	Pts	Qualification or relegation
1	Sparta Prague (C)	30	18	6	6	63	17	+46	42	Qualification for European Cup first round
2	Vítkovice	30	16	5	9	46	29	+17	37	Qualification for UEFA Cup first round
3	Bohemians Prague	30	13	9	8	50	42	+8	35	Qualification for UEFA Cup first round
4	DAC Dunajská Streda	30	13	8	9	46	35	+11	34	Qualification for Cup Winners' Cup first round
5	Baník Ostrava	30	13	7	10	55	39	+16	33	
6	RH Cheb	30	13	6	11	52	50	+2	32	
7	Slavia Prague	30	13	5	12	53	34	+19	31	
8	Plastika Nitra	30	12	6	12	47	42	+5	30	
9	Dukla Prague	30	11	8	11	37	47	−10	30	
10	Dukla Banská Bystrica	30	10	8	12	33	48	−15	28	
11	Spartak Trnava	30	12	3	15	41	52	−11	27	
12	ZVL Žilina	30	11	5	14	33	51	−18	27	
13	Tatran Prešov	30	11	4	15	37	51	−14	26	
14	Sigma Olomouc	30	9	7	14	41	49	−8	25	
15	Škoda Plzeň (R)	30	8	7	15	37	51	−14	23	Relegation to Czech National Football League
16	Dynamo České Budějovice (R)	30	8	4	18	24	58	−34	20	Relegation to Czech National Football League

Source: rsssf.com
(C) Champions; (R) Relegated

== Results ==
Home \ Away	OST	BOH	DAC	BB	DUK	ČBU	NIT	CHE	OLO	PLZ	SLA	SPA	TRN	VÍT	PRE	ŽIL
Baník Ostrava		2–2	3–0	3–0	5–0	2–0	3–3	5–2	3–0	4–3	0–3	0–1	2–0	1–0	4–1	2–0
Bohemians Prague	1–0		1–1	3–0	1–0	4–1	3–1	7–0	1–0	2–2	2–1	1–0	3–2	1–2	0–2	2–0
DAC Dunajská Streda	1–2	1–1		4–0	0–1	4–0	1–0	2–2	1–0	2–1	2–0	0–0	4–0	1–0	3–0	3–2
Dukla Banská Bystrica	0–0	1–1	1–1		2–0	3–0	1–3	2–0	1–0	2–1	1–3	2–1	4–1	1–0	0–1	2–0
Dukla Prague	2–4	3–3	1–4	2–2		3–0	0–1	0–0	3–0	1–0	0–2	0–5	1–0	1–1	1–0	1–0
Dynamo České Budějovice	1–0	1–2	0–0	2–2	0–3		3–0	1–0	3–1	1–0	0–3	0–1	1–0	1–2	2–0	0–0
Plastika Nitra	2–2	2–3	2–1	3–0	2–3	3–1		5–1	1–1	3–0	0–0	1–1	2–0	1–0	5–0	2–0
RH Cheb	1–1	4–2	2–1	1–1	1–1	3–3	3–0		3–1	2–1	1–0	3–1	3–0	1–0	1–0	6–0
Sigma Olomouc	2–2	3–1	2–3	1–2	1–0	2–1	2–0	3–1		2–2	3–0	3–3	2–1	3–1	5–1	3–3
Škoda Plzeň	1–0	3–0	1–2	1–1	1–1	1–2	2–0	3–2	0–0		1–0	2–0	2–1	1–1	4–0	0–1
Slavia Prague	5–3	1–1	3–0	3–0	1–2	6–0	1–1	1–3	3–0	5–1		0–0	1–1	3–2	5–0	2–0
Sparta Prague	2–0	3–0	4–1	3–1	0–1	3–0	5–0	2–0	0–0	6–0	3–0		3–0	4–0	3–0	5–1
Spartak Trnava	1–0	0–0	3–2	4–0	6–2	3–0	2–1	2–1	2–0	1–1	2–0	1–0		0–2	2–1	3–1
Vítkovice	2–0	2–0	2–0	1–1	1–0	2–0	1–0	1–0	3–0	5–1	3–1	0–0	5–2		3–0	3–2
Tatran Prešov	1–1	3–1	0–0	3–0	1–1	4–0	0–3	3–2	2–0	3–1	1–0	0–1	6–0	1–1		3–0
ZVL Žilina	2–1	1–1	1–1	2–0	3–3	1–0	2–0	1–3	2–1	1–0	1–0	0–3	2–1	2–0	2–0	

Source: statistiky1ligy.fotbal.cz
Legend: Blue = home team win; Yellow = draw; Red = away team win.

== Attendances ==
#	Club	Average	Highest
1	Sparta Praha	11,835	27,005
2	DAC	8,264	10,576
3	Sigma Olomouc	7,397	9,378
4	Slavia Praha	6,239	13,272
5	Nitra	6,016	10,780
6	Bohemians	5,774	11,956
7	Ostrava	5,136	9,263
8	Viktoria Plzeň	5,079	9,495
9	Spartak Trnava	4,919	13,322
10	České Budějovice	4,773	6,898
11	Vítkovice	4,114	12,134
12	Cheb	3,744	8,133
13	Tatran Prešov	3,553	7,345
14	Žilina	2,713	5,237
15	Dukla Banská Bystrica	2,672	4,786
16	Dukla Praha	1,862	7,193
