= Radek Onderka =

Czech footballer

Personal information
- Date of birth: 20 September 1973 (age 53)
- Place of birth: Opava, Czechoslovakia
- Height: 1.85 m (6 ft 1 in)
- Position: Forward

Senior career*
Years	Team	Apps	(Gls)
1993	FC Baník Ostrava	8	(3)
1993–1997	SK Sigma Olomouc	77	(24)
1997–1998	KFC Uerdingen 05	31	(7)
1999–2002	SFC Opava	39	(10)

International career
1994–1996	Czech Republic U21	7	(0)
- * Club domestic league appearances and goals

Radek Onderka (born 20 September 1973) is a Czech former footballer who played as a forward. He made over 100 appearances in the Gambrinus liga. He also played in the 2. Bundesliga in Germany for two seasons.

Onderka played international football at under-21 level for Czech Republic U21.

== Career ==
Onderka started his career with FC Baník Ostrava.
