= Petr Fousek =

Czech footballer

Personal information
- Full name: Petr Fousek
- Date of birth: 11 August 1972 (age 54)
- Height: 1.81 m (5 ft 11 in)
- Position: Midfielder

Senior career*
Years	Team	Apps	(Gls)
1993–1995	FK Ústí nad Labem		
1995–1996	Bohemians Praha	27	(14)
1996–2001	FK Teplice	135	(20)
2001	Chunnam Dragons	2	(0)
2003–2008	FK Ústí nad Labem		
- * Club domestic league appearances and goals

Petr Fousek (born 11 August 1972) is a Czech former professional footballer who played as a midfielder.

== Club career ==
He played mainly for Czech football clubs, as well as for Chunnam Dragons of the South Korean in 2001.

== Enternal links ==
- Petr Fousek – K League stats at kleague.com (in Korean and English)
