= 1989–90 Czechoslovak First League =

Czechoslovak First League
- Season: 1989–90
- Champions: Sparta Prague
- Relegated: Spartak Trnava; Považská Bystrica
- European Cup: Sparta Prague
- Cup Winners' Cup: Dukla Prague
- UEFA Cup: Baník Ostrava; Inter Bratislava
- Top goalscorer: Ľubomír Luhový (20 goals)

Statistics of Czechoslovak First League in the 1989–90 season. Ľubomír Luhový was the league's top scorer with 20 goals.

== Overview ==
It was contested by 16 teams, and Sparta Prague won the championship.

== Stadia and locations ==
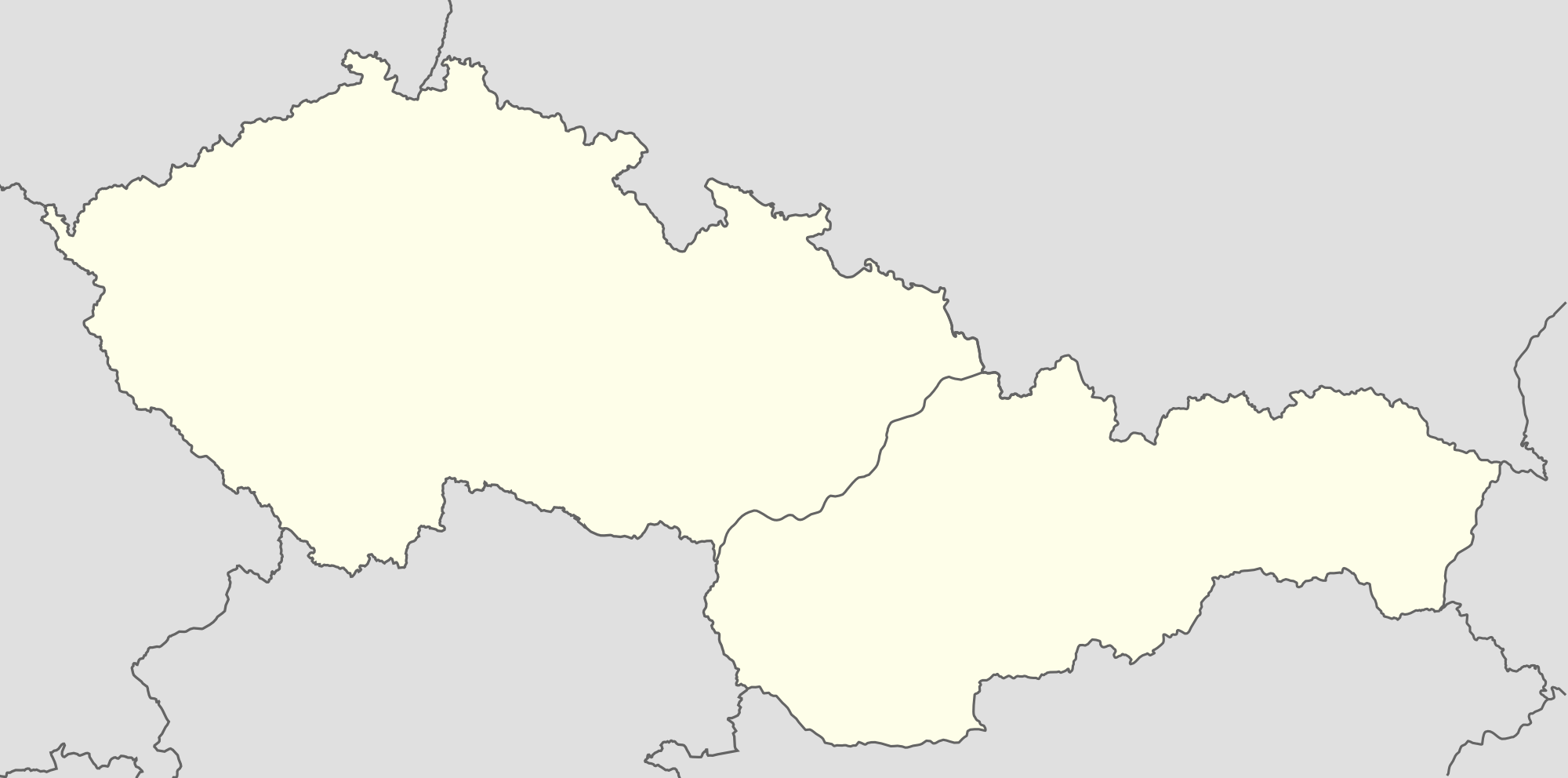
Location of clubs in the 1989–90 Czechoslovak First League

== League standings ==
Pos	Team	Pld	W	D	L	GF	GA	GD	Pts	Qualification or relegation
1	Sparta Prague (C)	30	21	4	5	77	27	+50	46	Qualification for European Cup first round
2	Baník Ostrava	30	16	9	5	50	24	+26	41	Qualification for UEFA Cup first round
3	Inter Bratislava	30	16	5	9	55	30	+25	37	Qualification for UEFA Cup first round
4	Bohemians Prague	30	14	7	9	43	31	+12	35	
5	Slovan Bratislava	30	10	15	5	29	25	+4	35	
6	Plastika Nitra	30	15	4	11	50	37	+13	34	
7	Dukla Prague	30	12	7	11	41	32	+9	31	Qualification for Cup Winners' Cup first round
8	Sigma Olomouc	30	12	7	11	39	42	−3	31	
9	Vítkovice	30	12	5	13	38	51	−13	29	
10	Slavia Prague	30	10	8	12	37	39	−2	28	
11	RH Cheb	30	11	5	14	28	34	−6	27	
12	Zbrojovka Brno	30	10	7	13	40	49	−9	27	
13	Dukla Banská Bystrica	30	10	5	15	35	42	−7	25	
14	DAC Dunajská Streda	30	9	6	15	30	43	−13	24	
15	Spartak Trnava (R)	30	4	10	16	23	62	−39	18	Relegation to Slovak National Football League
16	Považská Bystrica (R)	30	5	2	23	23	70	−47	12	Relegation to Slovak National Football League

Source: rsssf.com
(C) Champions; (R) Relegated

== Results ==
Home \ Away	OST	BOH	DAC	BB	DUK	INT	NIT	POV	CHE	OLO	SLA	SLO	SPA	TRN	VÍT	BRN
Baník Ostrava		1–0	3–0	5–2	0–1	1–0	3–0	1–0	2–1	2–0	0–0	0–0	2–1	5–2	2–0	7–0
Bohemians Prague	2–0		2–0	3–1	2–0	1–2	2–1	4–2	3–1	2–0	3–1	2–2	0–0	1–0	4–0	2–2
DAC Dunajská Streda	3–3	1–0		1–0	0–0	0–2	1–3	2–0	2–0	2–0	5–0	0–1	0–1	1–0	2–0	5–0
Dukla Banská Bystrica	1–2	3–0	2–0		1–5	1–3	4–0	3–0	2–1	2–0	2–0	1–1	0–1	1–0	0–1	0–0
Dukla Prague	1–1	2–0	5–0	1–0		0–1	0–1	4–0	0–1	3–0	0–0	2–1	1–0	1–1	2–0	1–0
Inter Bratislava	2–0	1–1	5–0	1–1	1–0		4–0	4–0	2–1	1–1	2–1	0–1	1–0	7–0	5–0	2–0
Plastika Nitra	0–0	3–0	2–0	5–1	2–1	2–0		2–1	2–0	3–0	3–2	1–1	4–0	9–1	2–1	1–2
Považská Bystrica	0–2	0–1	3–0	0–1	2–2	0–3	3–1		3–0	1–0	2–0	0–2	0–4	1–2	0–0	1–2
RH Cheb	0–0	1–1	3–0	1–0	1–1	1–0	3–1	2–0		1–0	1–0	0–1	1–3	1–0	2–0	2–1
Sigma Olomouc	1–0	1–0	1–0	2–1	2–2	1–0	2–0	6–0	3–1		1–1	2–0	3–3	2–2	2–1	2–1
Slavia Prague	1–1	1–0	0–0	1–0	3–1	2–2	0–1	4–1	1–0	4–0		4–2	0–1	3–0	2–0	2–1
Slovan Bratislava	0–0	0–0	0–0	1–1	1–0	3–0	1–1	2–1	0–0	2–2	2–0		0–0	2–0	1–1	1–0
Sparta Prague	4–1	1–2	3–2	1–1	4–0	6–2	2–0	7–0	1–0	1–0	3–0	5–0		10–1	5–2	2–1
Spartak Trnava	1–3	0–0	1–1	1–3	1–4	0–0	0–0	3–0	0–0	0–1	1–1	1–1	0–1		3–1	1–0
Vítkovice	0–2	3–0	2–2	3–0	2–1	3–2	1–0	2–1	2–1	4–2	2–1	1–0	1–3	1–1		3–2
Zbrojovka Brno	1–1	1–5	1–0	2–0	4–0	3–0	1–0	4–1	3–1	2–2	2–2	0–0	2–4	1–0	1–1	

Source: statistiky1ligy.fotbal.cz
Legend: Blue = home team win; Yellow = draw; Red = away team win.

== Attendances ==
#	Club	Average	Highest
1	Brno	8,301	19,723
2	Slovan	7,143	21,208
3	Sparta Praha	6,240	11,083
4	Sigma Olomouc	6,075	9,817
5	Ostrava	5,640	13,815
6	DAC	4,988	7,820
7	Inter Bratislava	4,309	7,569
8	Nitra	4,224	7,381
9	Spartak Trnava	4,087	7,038
10	Slavia Praha	3,742	5,716
11	Považská Bystrica	3,387	8,942
12	Vítkovice	3,335	12,678
13	Bohemians	3,192	5,139
14	Cheb	2,770	6,640
15	Dukla Banská Bystrica	2,057	4,960
16	Dukla Praha	1,273	2,857

== Top scorers ==
The top goalscorers in the 1989–90 Czechoslovak First League were as follows:

Rank	Player	Club	Goals
1	(Czechoslovakia) Ľubomír Luhový	Inter Bratislava	20
2	(Czechoslovakia) Róbert Kafka	TJ RH Cheb	18
3	(Czechoslovakia) Roman Kukleta	Sparta Prague	17
4	(Czechoslovakia) Ivo Schmucker	ŠK Slovan Bratislava	16
5	(Czechoslovakia) Ivan Hašek	Sparta Prague	15
