= 1987–88 Czechoslovak First League =

Czechoslovak First League
- Season: 1987–88
- Champions: Sparta Prague
- Relegated: ZVL Žilina; Tatran Prešov
- European Cup: Sparta Prague
- Cup Winners' Cup: Inter Bratislava
- UEFA Cup: Dukla Prague; Dunajská Streda
- Top goalscorer: Milan Luhový (24 goals)

The 1987–88 Czechoslovak First League season statistics of the top flight Czechoslovak First League in the 1987–88 season. Milan Luhový was the league's top scorer with 24 goals.

== Overview ==
It was contested by 16 teams, and Sparta Prague prevailed as the 1988 champions.

== Stadiums and locations ==
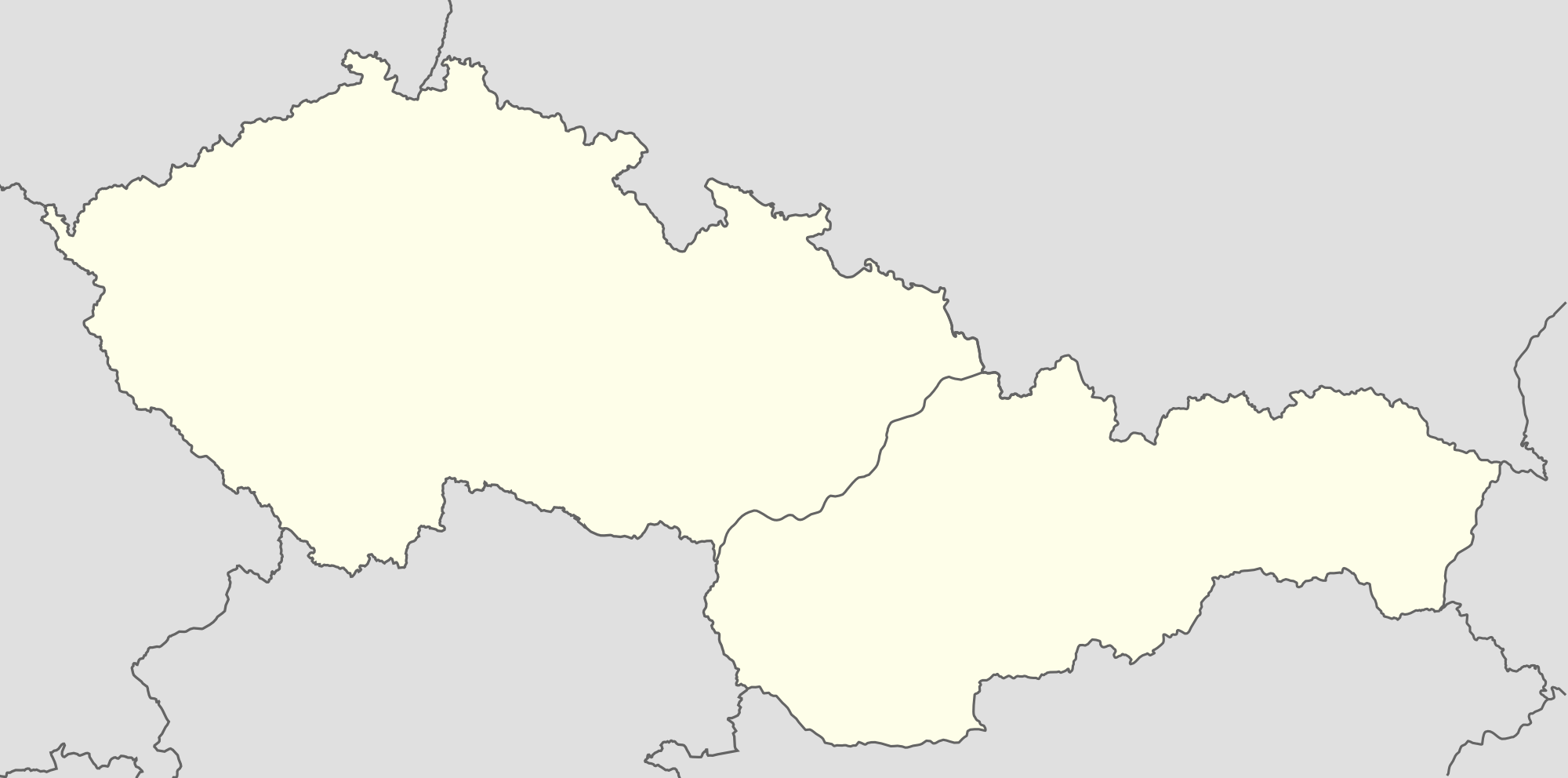
Location of clubs in the 1987–88 Czechoslovak First League

== League standings ==
Pos	Team	Pld	W	D	L	GF	GA	GD	Pts	Qualification or relegation
1	Sparta Prague (C)	30	22	5	3	82	22	+60	49	Qualification for European Cup first round
2	Dukla Prague	30	15	9	6	54	34	+20	39	Qualification for UEFA Cup first round
3	DAC Dunajská Streda	30	13	9	8	39	36	+3	35	Qualification for UEFA Cup first round
4	Baník Ostrava	30	13	8	9	49	40	+9	34	
5	Sigma Olomouc	30	12	8	10	50	46	+4	32	
6	Slavia Prague	30	12	7	11	49	45	+4	31	
7	Plastika Nitra	30	13	4	13	46	45	+1	30	
8	Vítkovice	30	11	7	12	49	45	+4	29	
9	Dukla Banská Bystrica	30	12	5	13	44	46	−2	29	
10	Spartak Trnava	30	11	7	12	38	42	−4	29	
11	RH Cheb	30	9	11	10	31	36	−5	29	
12	Bohemians Prague	30	13	3	14	41	54	−13	29	
13	Inter Bratislava	30	11	5	14	50	54	−4	27	Qualification for Cup Winners' Cup first round (Note: Inter Bratislava qualified for the Cup Winners' Cup as Czechoslovak Cup runners-up.)
14	Spartak Hradec Králové	30	8	11	11	32	52	−20	27	
15	ZVL Žilina (R)	30	7	7	16	32	54	−22	21	Relegation to Slovak National Football League
16	Tatran Prešov (R)	30	3	4	23	29	64	−35	10	Relegation to Slovak National Football League

Source: rsssf.com
(C) Champions; (R) Relegated

== Results ==
Home \ Away	OST	BOH	DAC	BB	DUK	INT	NIT	CHE	OLO	SLA	SPA	HRK	TRN	PRE	VÍT	ŽIL
Baník Ostrava		2–0	1–0	2–2	1–2	4–1	2–0	2–1	3–1	1–1	0–0	3–0	2–1	2–1	4–2	2–1
Bohemians Prague	2–0		1–0	4–2	1–2	2–0	2–1	2–1	0–1	3–2	0–6	0–1	2–1	2–1	4–0	2–0
DAC Dunajská Streda	1–0	2–0		2–0	1–1	1–0	3–0	1–1	3–1	1–0	2–2	2–1	2–2	3–1	0–0	1–0
Dukla Banská Bystrica	2–0	5–1	2–0		1–2	1–3	1–0	3–0	1–0	4–0	1–1	1–2	1–0	1–0	4–1	3–0
Dukla Prague	2–2	3–3	1–2	1–0		3–1	3–2	3–1	4–0	1–1	1–2	1–1	3–0	4–1	2–0	2–0
Inter Bratislava	2–0	4–2	3–2	3–0	0–1		4–1	3–1	1–1	1–4	0–2	2–3	3–1	5–2	3–1	1–1
Plastika Nitra	1–5	1–0	0–0	2–2	1–1	2–0		2–0	2–1	4–3	1–0	5–0	4–0	2–0	3–0	2–0
RH Cheb	4–2	2–1	1–1	2–0	1–0	0–0	1–1		1–1	2–0	2–1	4–4	0–1	0–0	0–0	1–0
Sigma Olomouc	4–2	1–1	3–0	1–1	1–1	3–1	2–0	1–0		4–1	2–1	0–2	1–3	2–0	3–1	5–0
Slavia Prague	2–0	4–1	2–1	1–1	3–4	3–0	0–3	1–1	4–1		0–1	0–0	2–1	2–0	1–1	2–0
Sparta Prague	1–0	5–0	6–0	5–1	3–0	3–1	1–0	2–0	2–2	5–0		7–0	5–1	4–2	3–1	4–1
Spartak Hradec Králové	0–0	4–1	0–3	1–2	1–1	1–1	1–0	1–1	0–0	0–2	1–1		2–1	4–1	0–0	1–4
Spartak Trnava	2–2	1–0	1–1	2–0	2–1	2–0	2–1	0–0	6–4	0–0	1–2	2–0		2–0	2–1	0–1
Tatran Prešov	0–1	0–1	1–2	3–0	0–3	2–4	4–5	0–1	2–2	2–3	1–3	1–1	1–0		1–1	1–0
Vítkovice	1–1	1–2	4–1	3–1	2–1	2–0	4–0	1–2	3–1	2–1	1–2	4–0	1–1	1–0		6–1
ZVL Žilina	3–3	1–1	1–1	4–1	0–0	3–3	3–0	2–0	0–1	0–4	0–2	2–0	0–0	3–1	1–4	

Source: statistiky1ligy.fotbal.cz
Legend: Blue = home team win; Yellow = draw; Red = away team win.

== Attendances ==
#	Football club	Average attendance
1	Spartak Hradec Králové	11,962
2	Sparta Praha	11,510
3	Sigma Olomouc	8,820
4	DAC Dunajská Streda	7,447
5	Slavia Praha	6,139
6	Spartak Trnava	5,557
7	Plastika Nitra	5,422
8	Baník Ostrava	5,302
9	Bohemians Praha	5,067
10	Inter Bratislava	4,636
11	TJ Vítkovice	4,181
12	RH Cheb	3,330
13	ZVL Žilina	2,944
14	Dukla Banská Bystrica	2,863
15	Tatran Prešov	2,349
16	Dukla Praha	2,259

== Top scorers ==
The top goalscorers in the 1987–88 Czechoslovak First League were as follows:

Rank	Player	Club	Goals
1	(Czech Republic) Milan Luhový	Dukla Prague	24
2	(Czech Republic) Václav Daněk	Baník Ostrava	23
3	(Czech Republic) Stanislav Griga	Sparta Prague	22
4	(Czech Republic) Radek Drulák	Sigma Olomouc	19
5	(Czech Republic) Karol Brezík	Inter Bratislava	18
