= MFK Vítkovice =

Association football club in the Czech Republic

- Full name: MFK Vítkovice z.s.
- Founded: 1919; 107 years ago
- Ground: Městský stadion
- Capacity: 15,163
- Chairman: Zdeněk Matoušek
- Manager: David Holiš
- League: Moravian-Silesian Football League
- 2025–26: 10th
- Website: www.mfkv.cz
Home colours	Away colours

MFK Vítkovice is a football club from Vítkovice, Ostrava, Czech Republic. It was founded in 1919 as FC Vítkovice, announced bankruptcy in 2011 and transformed to MFK Vítkovice. The club won the Czechoslovak First League in the 1985–86 season.

The club has always been somewhat overshadowed by the town's main team FC Baník Ostrava. The teams have a mutual rivalry, as Baník is based in the Silesian part of the city, while Vítkovice are located in the Moravian part of Ostrava. MFK Vítkovice however still maintain a small local fan base.

They also hold a rivalry with regional side FK Třinec.

== History ==
The club was founded in 1919 as SK Slavoj Vítkovice and played their matches in the Kunčičky district of Ostrava. The club however vanished due to financial problems and was succeeded in 1922 by SK Vítkovice. The club then became one of the strongest teams in the Ostrava region. In 1937–1938 a new stadium was constructed in the district of Vítkovice. It was supposed to be opened to the public in October 1938 but it was unable to proceed due to the German occupation of the city. Instead, the stadium was opened a few years later.

The club played in the highest division from 1950 to 1952. In 1952 the league underwent reorganization and Vítkovice were forcibly relegated to a lower division. However the club won promotion to the top flight again in 1981. Then in the 1985–1986 season the club achieved their greatest success, as Vítkovice led by manager Ivan Kopecký won the Czechoslovak First League. Vítkovice subsequently played in the European cup for the first time in their history. The club was strongly financially supported by local iron and steel works which fell into a financial crisis after the Velvet Revolution of 1989. The industry withdrew some of its support and the club was forced to merge with FC Karviná in 1994. Afterwards the club was relegated to the Second Division. The merger was overturned a year later, which meant the club was relegated to the Third Division in 1995, and although the club returned to the Second Division in 1996, Vítkovice struggled in the middle of the table. After persistent financial problems, the club dropped back to the Third Division (MSFL) in 2010.

On 9 February 2011, the club announced its withdrawal from the second half of the MSFL season due to insolvency. The club's results from the first half of the season were annulled, with the club's debts reported to be more than 15 million Czech koruna. They finished 2nd in the Regional Championship in the 2013–14 season and were promoted to Moravian Division E. They finished 2nd in Division E and won promotion to the MSFL in 2014–15.

In the season 2019/20, the club finished last 16th in the league table and relegated due to financial problems.

== Stadium ==
Městský stadion is a multi-purpose stadium in Ostrava-Vítkovice, Czech Republic. Used primarily for football, it is the home stadium of FC Vítkovice, and from the year 2015, even FC Baník Ostrava. In 2014-2015 it has been reconstructed. It also hosts the annual Golden Spike Ostrava athletic event. The stadium holds 15,275 spectators, for football matches 15,163. It hosted the 2018 IAAF Continental Cup.

== Historical names ==
- 1919 — SK Slavoj Vítkovice
- 1922 — SK Vítkovice
- 1923 — SSK Vítkovice
- 1937 — SK Železárny Vítkovice
- 1939 — ČSK Vítkovice
- 1945 — SK Vítkovice Železárny
- 1948 – Sokol Vítkovice Železárny
- 1953 — Baník Vítkovice
- 1957 — TJ VŽKG Ostrava
- 1979 — TJ Vítkovice
- 1993 — FC Vítkovice Kovkor
- 1994 — merger with Kovona Karviná => FC Karviná-Vítkovice
- 1995 — split => FC Vítkovice
- 2012 — MFK Vítkovice

== History in domestic competitions ==
- 1950–1952 Czechoslovak First League
- 1953–1981 ?
- 1981–1993 Czechoslovak First League
- 1993–1994 Czech First League
- 1994–1995: Czech 2. Liga
- 1995–1996: Moravian-Silesian Football League
- 1996–2010: Czech 2. Liga
- 2010–2011: Moravian-Silesian Football League

- Seasons spent at Level 1 of the football league system: 16
- Seasons spent at Level 2 of the football league system: ?
- Seasons spent at Level 3 of the football league system: ?

=== Czechoslovakia ===
Season	League	Placed	Pld	W	D	L	GF	GA	GD	Pts	Cup
1981–82	1. liga	9th	30	11	8	11	33	41	–8	30	Third round
1982–83	1. liga	7th	30	13	5	12	40	39	+1	31	Unknown
1983–84	1. liga	10th	30	10	7	13	36	45	–9	27	Fourth round
1984–85	1. liga	11th	30	8	10	12	30	41	–11	26	Round of 32
1985–86	1. liga	1st	30	14	12	4	48	32	+16	40	Second round
1986–87	1. liga	2nd	30	16	5	9	46	29	+17	37	Second round
1987–88	1. liga	8th	30	11	7	13	49	45	+4	29	Runners-up
1988–89	1. liga	11th	30	13	2	15	53	40	+13	28	Quarter-finals
1989–90	1. liga	9th	30	12	5	13	38	51	–13	29	Quarter-finals
1990–91	1. liga	12th	30	12	4	14	47	52	–5	28	Round of 32
1991–92	1. liga	10th	30	9	5	16	34	55	–21	23	Round of 32
1992–93	1. liga	10th	30	9	9	12	30	44	–14	27	Round of 16

=== Czech Republic ===
Season	League	Placed	Pld	W	D	L	GF	GA	GD	Pts	Cup
1993–94	1. liga	15th	30	3	7	20	22	64	–42	13 (Note: Two points for a win in 1993–94.)	Round of 16
1994–95	2. liga	6th	34	14	7	13	51	41	+10	49	Round of 16
1995–96	3. liga	-	-	-	-	-	-	-	-	-	Unknown
1996–97	2. liga	6th	30	9	16	5	31	25	+6	43	Round of 32
1997–98	2. liga	8th	30	10	7	11	31	31	0	37	Round of 32
1998–99	2. liga	5th	30	13	7	10	40	37	+3	46	Round of 16
1999–2000	2. liga	14th	30	7	12	11	23	38	–15	33	Semi-finals
2000–01	2. liga	9th	30	9	10	11	37	43	–6	37	First round
2001–02	2. liga	8th	30	9	13	8	38	38	0	40	Second round
2002–03	2. liga	6th	30	13	6	11	39	33	+6	45	Round of 16
2003–04	2. liga	10th	30	9	10	11	28	36	–8	37	Round of 32
2004–05	2. liga	9th	28	10	12	6	35	30	+5	33 (Note: Deducted 9 points.)	First round
2005–06	2. liga	9th	30	9	9	12	26	33	–7	36	Round of 16
2006–07	2. liga	12th	30	8	8	14	31	50	–19	32	Second round
2007–08	2. liga	11th	30	10	6	14	35	41	–6	36	Second round
2008–09	2. liga	14th	30	8	9	13	34	47	–13	33	Second round
2009–10	2. liga	16th	30	4	6	20	23	51	–28	18	Round of 32
2010–11	3. liga	-	-	-	-	-	-	-	-	-	Second round

== Honours and achievements ==
- Czechoslovak First League (first tier)
  - Champions: 1985–86
- Moravian–Silesian Football League (third tier)
  - Champions: 1995–96
- UEFA Cup
  - Quarter-finals: 1987–88
