= FK Benešov =

- Full name: FK Benešov z.s.
- Founded: 1913; 113 years ago
- Ground: Městský stadion
- Capacity: 8,000
- Chairman: Tomáš Novák
- Manager: Petr Mikolanda
- League: Czech Fourth Division - Divize A
- 2025–26: 1st (promoted)
- Website: www.fkbenesov.cz

FK Benešov is a Czech football club located in Benešov. The team currently plays in the Czech Fourth Division, the fourth tier of the Czech football system.

== History ==
Former logo

In the 1994–95 season the club played in the Czech First League, the top flight of Czech football. The club started with three wins and a draw from the first six matches, but was beset by financial problems. The owner and only sponsor of the club, Miroslav Švarc, was taken into police custody on charges of financial criminality, team coach Jaroslav Hřebík left after the first half of the season, and the players were not paid between October and February.

Benešov's results did not improve and club captain Tibor Mičinec cited the club's financial situation as the reason for a run of 24 games without a win. As a result, the team were relegated to the Czech 2. Liga for the 1995–96 season, but fell further, spending the 2000s in the Czech Fourth Division.

In June 2014 the club was promoted to the Bohemian Football League under the coach Luboš Zákostelský.

== Historical names ==
- 1913: AFK Benešov
- 1929: Benešovský SK
- ca. 1940: Slavoj Benešov
- 1948: Sokol Benešov
- 1949: Sokol ČSD Benešov
- 1953: TJ Lokomotíva Benešov
- 1971: TJ ČSAD Benešov
- 1990: FK Švarc Benešov
- 1996: FK Benešov
- 1999: SK Benešov
- 2024: FK Benešov

== History in domestic competitions ==
- 1985–1991 2.ČNL (tier 3)
- 1991–1993 ČMFL (tier 2)
- 1993–1994 Czech 2. Liga
- 1994–1995 Czech First League
- 1995–1996 Czech 2. Liga
- 1996–1999 (inactive)
- 1999–2000 Regional Championship (tier 5)
- 2000–2007 Czech Fourth Division
- 2007–2008 Regional Championship (tier 5)
- 2008–2014 Czech Fourth Division
- 2014–2023 Bohemian Football League
- 2023–2026 Czech Fourth Division
- 2026– Bohemian Football League

- Seasons spent at Level 1 of the football league system: 1
- Seasons spent at Level 2 of the football league system: 4
- Seasons spent at Level 3 of the football league system: 14
- Seasons spent at Level 4 of the football league system: 14
