= FK Hvězda Cheb =

Hvězda Cheb
- Full name: FK Hvězda Cheb
- Founded: 1951 (original club); 2001 (phoenix club)
- Dissolved: 1996 (original club)
- Ground: Stadion Lokomotiva, Cheb, Czech Republic
- League: Czech Fourth Division, Divize A
- 2013–14: 10th
Home colours

FK Hvězda Cheb is a Czech football club, playing in the town of Cheb. The club was founded in 1951 and refounded in 2001 after a bankruptcy in 1996. The club played for 13 consecutive seasons in the Czechoslovak First League between 1979 and 1992, and played three seasons in the Czech First League, finishing fourth in the 1993–94 season. The club played in the third-tier Bohemian Football League between 2006 and 2008. After the 2007–08 season the club announced it would not take part in the following season's competition due to financial difficulties. It currently plays in the Czech Fourth Division.

The club also had appearances in Europe playing the Mitropa Cup in 1980 and in Intertoto Cup 1981, in which it won its group.

The club announced a change in its name from Union Cheb to Hvězda Cheb in 2011.

== Club's name ==
- 1951: VSJ Sokolovo Cheb
- 1952: DSO Rudá Hvězda Cheb
- 1966: VTJ Dukla Hraničář Cheb
- 1972: TJ Rudá Hvězda Cheb (RH Cheb)
- 1990: SKP Union Cheb
- 1994: FC Union Cheb
- 1996: defunct
- 2001: founded a phoenix club
- 2011: FK Hvězda Cheb

== Famous players ==
Czechoslovak and Czech international players

- Jozef Chovanec, 1979–1981, 52 caps, 4 goals
- Milan Frýda
- Vladimír Hruška, 1979–1981, 3 caps, 1 goal
- Zdeněk Koubek, 1979–1983, 5 caps
- Pavel Kuka, 1987–1989, 89 caps
- Radim Nečas, 1995–2000, 4 caps
- Lubomír Pokluda 1979 – 1984, 4 caps, 1980 olympic gold medalist
- Petr Samec, 1992–1995, 9 Caps, 2 goals
- Horst Siegl, 1989–1990, 23 caps, 7 goals
- Jaroslav Šilhavý, 1990–1991, 4 caps
