= 1999–2000 AC Sparta Prague season =

AC Sparta Prague
1999–2000 season
- Head coach: Ivan Hašek
- Stadium: Letná Stadium
- Czech First League: 1st
- Czech Cup: Fourth round
- Champions League: Second group stage
- Top goalscorer: League: Vratislav Lokvenc (22); All: Vratislav Lokvenc (26)

The 1999–2000 AC Sparta Prague season was the club's 105th season in existence and the seventh consecutive season in the top flight of Czech football. In addition to the domestic league, AC Sparta Prague participated in this season's editions of the Czech Cup and the UEFA Champions League. The season covered the period from 1 July 1999 to 30 June 2000.

== Season summary ==
Sparta won their fourth straight league title and also managed to reach the second group stage of the Champions League

== Squad ==
Squad at end of season

Note: Flags indicate national team as defined under FIFA eligibility rules; some limited exceptions apply. Players may hold more than one non-FIFA nationality.

No.	Pos.	Nation	Player
1	GK	(Czech Republic) CZE	Tomáš Poštulka
2	DF	(Czech Republic) CZE	Petr Gabriel
3	DF	(Slovakia) SVK	Vladimír Labant
4	MF	(Czech Republic) CZE	Martin Hašek
5	DF	(Czech Republic) CZE	Michal Horňák
6	MF	(Czech Republic) CZE	Zdeněk Svoboda
7	MF	(Czech Republic) CZE	Jan Flachbart
8	MF	(Czech Republic) CZE	Jiří Novotný (vice-captain)
9	FW	(Czech Republic) CZE	Vratislav Lokvenc
10	FW	(Czech Republic) CZE	Horst Siegl (captain)
11	FW	(Czech Republic) CZE	Josef Obajdin
12	MF	(Czech Republic) CZE	Vlastimil Svoboda

No.	Pos.	Nation	Player
13	DF	(Czech Republic) CZE	René Bolf (on loan from Baník Ostrava)
14	MF	(Czech Republic) CZE	Libor Sionko
17	MF	(Czech Republic) CZE	Pavel Novotný
19	FW	(Slovakia) SVK	Martin Prohászka
20	MF	(Czech Republic) CZE	Jiří Jarošík
22	GK	(Czech Republic) CZE	Michal Čaloun
23	MF	(Czech Republic) CZE	Miroslav Baranek
25	MF	(Czech Republic) CZE	Tomáš Rosický
27	DF	(Czech Republic) CZE	Milan Fukal
36	FW	(Czech Republic) CZE	Tomáš Jun
78	DF	(Czech Republic) CZE	Roman Lengyel
96	GK	(Czech Republic) CZE	Jaromír Blažek
99	MF	(Czech Republic) CZE	Pavel Hapal

== Transfers ==
=== In ===
- Vladimír Labant - Slavia Prague
- Jan Flachbart - Bohemians 1905
- Milan Fukal - FK Baumit Jablonec
- Roman Lengyel - Dynamo České Budějovice
- Jaromír Blažek - Bohemians 1905
- Pavel Hapal - Sigma Olomouc

=== Loan in ===
- René Bolf - Baník Ostrava

== Competitions ==
=== Overview ===
Competition	First match	Last match	Starting round	Final position	Record							
Competition	First match	Last match	Starting round	Final position	Pld	W	D	L	GF	GA	GD	Win %
Czech First League	30 July 1999	17 May 2000	Matchday 1	3rd	30	24	4	2	81	23	+58	80.00
Czech Cup	3 August 1999	14 February 2000	Third round	Fourth round	3	2	0	1	10	2	+8	66.67
UEFA Champions League	15 September 1999	21 March 2000	First group stage	Second group stage	12	4	5	3	19	18	+1	33.33
Total					45	30	9	6	110	43	+67	66.67

Source: Competitions

=== Czech First League ===
==== League table ====
Pos	Team	Pld	W	D	L	GF	GA	GD	Pts	Qualification or relegation
1	Sparta Prague (C)	30	24	4	2	81	23	+58	76	Qualification for Champions League third qualifying round
2	Slavia Prague	30	21	5	4	53	25	+28	68	Qualification for Champions League second qualifying round
3	Drnovice	30	14	6	10	36	32	+4	48	Qualification for UEFA Cup qualifying round
4	Brno	30	12	6	12	35	33	+2	42	
5	Teplice	30	10	11	9	38	38	0	41	

Source: Fortuna liga
Rules for classification: 1) points; 2) head-to-head points; 3) head-to-head goal difference; 4) head-to-head goals scored; 5) goal difference; 6) number of goals scored.
(C) Champions

===== Results summary =====
Overall								Home						Away					
Pld	W	D	L	GF	GA	GD	Pts	W	D	L	GF	GA	GD	W	D	L	GF	GA	GD
30	24	4	2	81	23	+58	76	14	1	0	50	8	+42	10	3	2	31	15	+16

Source: See results

===== Results by round =====
Round	1	2	3	4	5	6	7	8	9	10	11	12	13	14	15	16	17	18	19	20	21	22	23	24	25	26	27	28	29	30
Ground	H	A	H	A	H	H	A	H	A	H	A	H	A	H	A	A	H	A	H	A	A	H	A	H	A	H	A	H	A	H
Result	W	D	W	L	W	W	D	D	W	W	W	W	L	W	W	W	W	W	W	W	W	W	W	W	W	W	W	W	D	W
Position	5	5	2	2	3	2	2	3	3	2	2	2	2	2	2	2	2	2	2	2	2	2	2	2	2	1	1	1	1	1

Source: See results
A = Away; H = Home; W = Win; D = Draw; L = Loss

==== Matches ====
30 July 1999 1	Sparta Prague	2–1	Viktoria Žižkov	Prague
	Sionko 3'; Labant 90' (pen.)	Report	Navrátil 59'	Stadium: Letná Stadium; Attendance: 5,784; Referee: Michal Beneš

7 August 1999 2	Opava	1–1	Sparta Prague	Opava
	Onderka 45'	Report	Sionko 59'	Stadium: Stadion v Městských sadech Attendance: 14,924; Referee: Lubomír Puček

14 August 1999 3	Sparta Prague	3–0	Jablonec	Prague
	Lokvenc 67'; Sionko 77'; Prohászka 82' (pen.)	Report		Stadium: Letná Stadium; Attendance: 6,100; Referee: Patrik Filípek

22 August 1999 4	Teplice	4–2	Sparta Prague	Teplice
	Bílek 16', 24', 89' (pen.); Divecký 17'	Report	Baranek 14'; Bolf (yellow card) 49' (red card) 66'; Fukal 84'	Stadium: Na Stínadlech; Attendance: 18,500; Referee: Michal Beneš

28 August 1999 5	Sparta Prague	2–1	Dukla Příbram	Prague
	Gabriel 40'; Fukal 86'	Report	Mynář 67'	Stadium: Letná Stadium; Attendance: 6,066; Referee: Ivo Polák

11 September 1999 6	Sparta Prague	7–0	České Budějovice	Prague
	Lokvenc 2', 9'; Rosický 7', 31'; Svoboda 25'; Sionko 65'; Penner 76' (o.g.)	Report		Stadium: Letná Stadium; Attendance: 7,364; Referee: Jaroslav Jára

18 September 1999 7	Brno	1–1	Sparta Prague	Brno
	Polák 85'	Report	Obajdin 56'	Stadium: Stadion Za Lužánkami; Attendance: 23,800; Referee: Miroslav Liba

24 September 1999 8	Sparta Prague	0–0	Bohemians Prague	Prague
		Report		Stadium: Letná Stadium; Attendance: 10,125; Referee: Lubomír Puček

2 October 1999 9	Baník Ostrava	0–3	Sparta Prague	Ostrava
		Report	Baranek 33', 89'; Jarošík 60'	Stadium: Městský stadion Attendance: 11,528; Referee: Josef Krula

15 October 1999 10	Sparta Prague	3–1	Hradec Králové	Prague
	Obajdin 26'; Baranek 45'; Fukal 61'	Report	Kraus 58'	Stadium: Letná Stadium; Attendance: 2,559; Referee: Pavlín Jirků

23 October 1999 11	Slovan Liberec	1–2	Sparta Prague	Liberec
	Lázzaro 47'	Report	Obajdin 31'; Fukal 90'	Stadium: Stadion u Nisy; Attendance: 4,335; Referee: Michal Beneš

30 October 1999 12	Sparta Prague	3–1	Blšany	Prague
	Labant 13' (pen.); Obajdin 26'; Baranek 45'	Report	Došek 76'	Stadium: Letná Stadium; Attendance: 4,301; Referee: Marcel Hábl

8 November 1999 13	Slavia Prague	2–1	Sparta Prague	Prague
	Horváth 15'; Vágner 85'	Report	P. Novotný 63'	Stadium: Stadion Eden; Attendance: 13,532; Referee: Josef Krula

19 November 1999 14	Sparta Prague	6–0	Sigma Olomouc	Prague
	Baranek 12'; Siegl 27', 41'; Lokvenc 51'; Bolf 86'; Fukal 90'	Report		Stadium: Letná Stadium; Attendance: 2,926; Referee: Jaroslav Bejlek

28 November 1999 15	Drnovice	0–1	Sparta Prague	Drnovice
		Report	Lokvenc 33'; Baranek (red card) 39'	Stadium: Sportovní areál Attendance: 8,198; Referee: Patrik Filípek

4 December 1999 16	Viktoria Žižkov	2–3	Sparta Prague	Prague
	Kincl 27', 52'	Report	Svoboda 46' (pen.); Lokvenc 69', 86'	Stadium: FK Viktoria Stadion; Attendance: 7,342; Referee: Josef Krula

19 February 2000 17	Sparta Prague	4–0	Opava	Prague
	Hapal 48'; Obajdin 44'; Sionko 50'; Lokvenc 73'	Report		Stadium: Letná Stadium; Attendance: 4,348; Referee: Jaroslav Jára

27 February 2000 18	Jablonec	0–2	Sparta Prague	Jablonec
		Report	Hapal 39' (pen.); Lokvenc 82'	Stadium: Stadion Střelnice; Attendance: 7,690; Referee: Patrik Filípek

4 March 2000 19	Sparta Prague	3–2	Teplice	Prague
	Baranek 2', 9'; Fukal 90'	Report	Verbíř 76'; Holomek 79'	Stadium: Letná Stadium; Attendance: 7,019; Referee: Vitězslav Holub

11 March 2000 20	Dukla Příbram	1–3	Sparta Prague	Příbram
	Kulič 74'	Report	Svoboda 45'; Lokvenc 80', 90'	Stadium: Na Litavce; Attendance: 12,562; Referee: Lubomír Puček

18 March 2000 21	České Budějovice	1–4	Sparta Prague	České Budějovice
	Vácha 37'; Káník (yellow card) 42' (red card) 64'	Report	Lokvenc 52', 60', 67', 79'	Stadium: Stadion Střelecký ostrov Attendance: 8,942; Referee: Marcel Hábl

25 March 2000 22	Sparta Prague	3–0	Brno	Prague
	Fukal 5'; Siegl 58'; Lokvenc 81'	Report		Stadium: Letná Stadium; Attendance: 5,364; Referee: Michal Beneš

2 April 2000 23	Bohemians Prague	0–1	Sparta Prague	Prague
		Report	Siegl 60'	Stadium: Ďolíček; Attendance: 10,582; Referee: Milan Šedivý

9 April 2000 24	Sparta Prague	2–0	Baník Ostrava	Prague
	Siegl 48'; Rosický 62'	Report		Stadium: Letná Stadium; Attendance: 7,611; Referee: Jaroslav Bejlek

14 April 2000 25	Hradec Králové	0–2	Sparta Prague	Hradec Králové
		Report	Jarošík 5'; Siegl 41'	Stadium: Všesportovní stadion Attendance: 5,121; Referee: Patrik Filípek

22 April 2000 26	Sparta Prague	2–1	Slovan Liberec	Prague
	Siegl 53'; Lokvenc 82'	Report	Kožuch 62'	Stadium: Letná Stadium; Attendance: 6,132; Referee: Jaroslav Jára

30 April 2000 27	Blšany	1–4	Sparta Prague	Blšany
	Koubek 42'; S. Krejčík (yellow card) 72' (red card) 87'	Report	Jarošík 21'; Lokvenc 54', 56'; Siegl 76'	Stadium: Městský Stadium; Attendance: 4,600; Referee: Jaromír Hlaváč

6 May 2000 28	Sparta Prague	5–1	Slavia Prague	Prague
	Lokvenc 20', 32'; Gabriel 34'; Baranek 53'; J. Novotný 67'	Report	Dostálek 18'	Stadium: Letná Stadium; Attendance: 18,849; Referee: Michal Beneš

13 May 2000 29	Sigma Olomouc	1–1	Sparta Prague	Olomouc
	Kovář 47'	Report	Horňák (yellow card) 22' (red card) 52'; Baranek 57'	Stadium: Andrův stadion Attendance: 7,766; Referee: Luboš Helebrant

17 May 2000 30	Sparta Prague	5–0	Drnovice	Prague
	Siegl 48', 77'; Lokvenc 57'; Rosický 67', 86'	Report		Stadium: Letná Stadium; Attendance: 8,899; Referee: Jaroslav Jára

=== Czech Cup ===
3 August 1999 Second round	Roudnice	0–8	Sparta Prague	Roudnice nad Labem
		Report	Prohászka 4', 27'; Stracený 7'; P. Novotný 15', 36'; Papoušek 30'; Svoboda 45'; Rosický 90'	Stadium: Stadion Pod Lipou

12 October 1999 Third round	Střížkov	1–2	Sparta Prague	Prague
15:30 CEST (UTC+2)	T. Krejčík 10'	Report	Siegl 41'; Bolf 53'	Stadium: Stadion SK Prosek; Attendance: 1,200; Referee: Patrik Filípek

14 February 2000 Fourth round	Viktoria Plzeň	1–0	Sparta Prague	Plzeň
	Švejnoha 63'	Report		Stadium: Stadion města Plzně; Attendance: 3,050; Referee: Michal Beneš

=== UEFA Champions League ===
==== First group stage ====
Pos	Team	Pld	W	D	L	GF	GA	GD	Pts	Qualification
1	(Czech Republic) Sparta Prague	6	3	3	0	14	6	+8	12	Advance to second group stage
2	(France) Bordeaux	6	3	3	0	7	4	+3	12	Advance to second group stage
3	(Russia) Spartak Moscow	6	1	2	3	9	12	−3	5	Transfer to UEFA Cup
4	(Netherlands) Willem II	6	0	2	4	7	15	−8	2	

Source: UEFA

15 September 1999 1	Sparta Prague (Czech Republic)	0–0	(France) Bordeaux	Prague, Czech Republic
20:45 CEST (UTC+2)		Report		Stadium: Letná Stadium; Attendance: 14,928; Referee: Terje Hauge (Norway)

21 September 1999 2	Spartak Moscow (Russia)	1–1	(Czech Republic) Sparta Prague	Moscow, Russia
18:00 CEST (UTC+2)	Bezrodny 72'	Report	Lokvenc 17'	Stadium: Luzhniki Stadium; Attendance: 43,000; Referee: Karl-Erik Nilsson (Sweden)

28 September 1999 3	Sparta Prague (Czech Republic)	4–0	(Netherlands) Willem II	Prague, Czech Republic
20:45 CEST (UTC+2)	J. Novotný 26'; Prohászka 29' (pen.); Rosický 41'; Jarošík 59'	Report		Stadium: Letná Stadium; Attendance: 10,581; Referee: Bernd Heynemann (Germany)

19 October 1999 4	Willem II (Netherlands)	3–4	(Czech Republic) Sparta Prague	Tilburg, Netherlands
20:45 CEST (UTC+2)	Bombarda 1'; Shoukov 6'; Schenning 50'	Report	J. Novotný 17'; Labant 54' (pen.), 90' (pen.); Baranek 62'	Stadium: Koning Willem II Stadion; Attendance: 13,419; Referee: Alain Sars (France)

26 October 1999 5	Bordeaux (France)	0–0	(Czech Republic) Sparta Prague	Bordeaux, France
20:45 CEST (UTC+2)		Report		Stadium: Parc Lescure; Attendance: 22,138; Referee: Manuel Díaz Vega (Spain

3 November 1999 6	Sparta Prague (Czech Republic)	5–2	(Russia) Spartak Moscow	Prague, Czech Republic
20:45 CET (UTC+1)	Lokvenc 1', 66'; Rosický 11'; Fukal 49'; Labant 63' (pen.)	Report	Bulatov 34'; Bezrodny 45'	Stadium: Letná Stadium; Attendance: 12,106; Referee: Michel Piraux (Belgium)

==== Second group stage ====
Pos	Team	Pld	W	D	L	GF	GA	GD	Pts	Qualification
1	(Spain) Barcelona	6	5	1	0	17	5	+12	16	Advance to knockout stage
2	(Portugal) Porto	6	3	1	2	8	8	0	10	Advance to knockout stage
3	(Czech Republic) Sparta Prague	6	1	2	3	5	12	−7	5	
4	(Germany) Hertha BSC	6	0	2	4	3	8	−5	2	

Source: UEFA

23 November 1999 1	Sparta Prague (Czech Republic)	0–2	(Portugal) Porto	Prague, Czech Republic
20:45 CET (UTC+1)		Report	Drulović 77'; Jardel 84'	Stadium: Letná Stadium; Attendance: 14,625; Referee: Gilles Veissière (France)

8 December 1999 2	Barcelona (Spain)	5–0	(Czech Republic) Sparta Prague	Barcelona, Spain
20:45 CET (UTC+1)	Kluivert 44', 63'; Luis Enrique 45', 76'; Guardiola 60'	Report		Stadium: Camp Nou; Attendance: 54,303; Referee: Pierluigi Collina (Italy)

1 March 2000 3	Hertha BSC (Germany)	1–1	(Czech Republic) Sparta Prague	Berlin, Germany
20:45 CET (UTC+1)	Veit 45'	Report	Siegl 84'	Stadium: Olympiastadion; Attendance: 30,377; Referee: Claude Colombo (France)

7 March 2000 4	Sparta Prague (Czech Republic)	1–0	(Germany) Hertha BSC	Prague, Czech Republic
20:45 CET (UTC+1)	Fukal 90'	Report		Stadium: Letná Stadium; Attendance: 9,101; Referee: Anders Frisk (Sweden)

15 March 2000 5	Porto (Portugal)	2–2	(Czech Republic) Sparta Prague	Porto, Portugal
20:45 CET (UTC+1)	Jorge Costa 16'; Capucho 64'	Report	Lokvenc 74'; Fukal 90'	Stadium: Estádio das Antas; Attendance: 27,200; Referee: Günter Benkö (Austria)

21 March 2000 6	Sparta Prague (Czech Republic)	1–2	(Spain) Barcelona	Prague, Czech Republic
20:45 CET (UTC+1)	Svoboda 18'	Report	Gabri 52', 89'	Stadium: Letná Stadium; Attendance: 20,224; Referee: Rune Pedersen (Norway)
