= Czech First League records and statistics =

The Czech First League is a Czech professional league for association football clubs. At the top of the Czech Republic football league system, it is the country's primary football competition and is contested by 16 clubs. The history of the Czech football league began with its reorganisation for the 1993–94 season following the dissolution of Czechoslovakia and therefore the league became the successor of the Czechoslovak League.

Following statistics count only seasons of Czech First League since its inception in 1993.

As of 9 November 2026.

== Player records ==
Clubs are in order of the first appearance. Highlighted players currently plays in the Czech First League.

=== Most appearances ===
Rank	Player	Matches	Years active	Clubs
1	(Czech Republic) Milan Petržela	537	2003–2026	Slovácko, Jablonec, Sparta, Plzeň
2	(Czech Republic) Josef Jindřišek	448	2003–2025	Jablonec, Olomouc, Bohemians 1905
3	(Czech Republic) Václav Procházka	447	2003–2023	Plzeň, Slovácko, Mladá Boleslav, Ostrava, Zlín
4	(Czech Republic) Jiří Fleišman	444	2010–2026	Liberec, Mladá Boleslav, Ostrava, Karviná
5	(Czech Republic) Marek Matějovský	443	2001–2025	Jablonec, Mladá Boleslav, Sparta
6	(Czech Republic) Stanislav Vlček	436	1993–2012	Bohemians 1905, České Budějovice, Olomouc, Slavia
7	(Czech Republic) Jan Kovařík	434	2008–	České Budějovice, Slavia, Jablonec, Plzeň, Bohemians 1905
8	(Czech Republic) Martin Vaniak	432	1993–2011	Olomouc, Drnovice, Most, Slavia
8	(Czech Republic) Rudolf Otepka	432	1996–2012	Zlín, Příbram, Drnovice, Ostrava, Olomouc, České Budějovice
10	(Czech Republic) Pavel Horváth	426	1993–2015	Sparta, Jablonec, Slavia, Teplice, Plzeň

=== Most appearances by country ===
Note: Countries indicate national team as defined under FIFA eligibility rules. Players may hold more than one non-FIFA nationality. Changes in FIFA nationality that occurred outside of the player's time in the Czech First League are not taken into account.

Country	Player	Matches	Goals	Notes
Albania	Qazim Laçi	75	4	
Angola	Gigli Ndefe	222	6	Born in the Netherlands, he represents Angola
Argentina	Leandro Lázzaro	83	34	
Armenia	Edgar Malakyan	11	0	
Australia	Golgol Mebrahtu	42	14	Born in Sudan, he represents Australia
Austria	Marko Kvasina	50	4	
Azerbaijan	Kamran Agayev	5	0	
Bahrain	Abdulla Yusuf Helal	167	30	
Belarus	Vitali Trubila	109	5	
Belgium	Olivier Vliegen	51	0	
Benin	Mohamed Tijani	41	1	Born in Ivory Coast, he represents Benin
Bosnia and Herzegovina	Admir Ljevaković	306	14	
Brazil	Daniel Rossi	205	11	
Bulgaria	Martin Minchev	70	10	
Burkina Faso	Nassim Innocenti	15	0	Born in France, he represents Burkina Faso
Burundi	Bienvenue Kanakimana	41	5	
Cameroon	Joss Didiba	121	2	
Canada	André Hainault	48	1	
Cape Verde	Nando Maria Neves	88	8	
Central African Republic	Vénuste Baboula	8	1	
Colombia	Jhon Mosquera	198	31	
Congo	Francis Litsingi	84	24	
Costa Rica	Winston Parks	17	2	
Croatia	Andrej Kerić	135	36	
Curaçao	Rigino Cicilia	67	12	
DR Congo	Joel Ngandu Kayamba	89	6	
Denmark	Asger Sørensen	104	9	
Ecuador	Augusto Batioja	40	1	
Egypt	Mohamed Yasser	65	11	
England	Byron Webster	23	4	
Equatorial Guinea	Santiago Eneme	51	2	
Estonia	Vlasiy Sinyavskiy	160	10	
Ethiopia	Fikru Teferra	9	0	
Finland	Kaan Kairinen	103	4	
France	Alexandre Mendy	207	24	
Gabon	Guélor Kanga	69	28	
Gambia	Lamin Jawo	175	29	
Georgia	Vakhtang Chanturishvili	230	12	
Germany	Till Schumacher	57	2	
Ghana	Benjamin Tetteh	98	21	
Greece	Marios Pourzitidis	143	5	
Guadeloupe	Kévin Malpon	7	0	Born in Martinique, he represents Guadeloupe
Guinea	Kamso Mara	97	11	
Haiti	Kevin Lafrance	22	2	Born in France, he represents Haiti
Honduras	Luis Ramos	10	0	
Hungary	Ferenc Róth	70	3	
Iceland	Hilmir Rafn Mikaelsson	6	0	
Iraq	Merchas Doski	116	5	Born in Germany, he represents Iraq
Israel	Tal Ben Haim	20	0	
Italy	Marco Ferrara	8	0	
Ivory Coast	Ibrahim Traoré	191	14	
Jamaica	Rolando Aarons	12	0	
Japan	Hidetoshi Wakui	10	0	
Kenya	Patrick Oboya	27	2	
Kosovo	Albion Rrahmani	57	16	
Kuwait	Aziz Mashaan	31	2	
Kyrgyzstan	Sergey Nikitin	7	0	
Latvia	Dāvis Ikaunieks	113	22	
Liberia	Oscar Dorley	214	12	
Lithuania	Tomas Radzinevičius	64	9	
Luxembourg	Rayan Berberi	8	1	
Malaysia	Dion Cools	8	0	
Mali	Amadou Dante	14	1	
Martinique	Florent Poulolo	87	3	
Mexico	Cesáreo Victorino	4	0	
Moldova	Valeriu Andronic	18	1	
Mongolia	Tuguldur Gantogtokh	3	0	
Montenegro	Vladimir Jovović	150	18	
Netherlands	Mick van Buren	195	40	
Niger	Soune Soungole	55	0	Born in Ivory Coast, he represents Niger
Nigeria	Peter Olayinka	144	38	
North Macedonia	Veliče Šumulikoski	169	8	
Northern Ireland	Paul Munster	3	0	
Norway	Andreas Vindheim	44	3	
Peru	Oliver Sonne	15	2	Born in Denmark, he represents Peru
Poland	Bartosz Pikul	33	2	
Portugal	Danny	21	1	
Romania	Florin Niță	109	0	
Russia	Vladislav Levin	112	2	
Scotland	Andy Irving	23	3	
Senegal	Dame Diop	119	24	
Serbia	Vukadin Vukadinović	243	23	
Slovakia	Karol Kisel	279	49	
Slovenia	Elvis Bratanović	43	8	
South Africa	Keegan Ritchie	4	0	
South Korea	Kim Seung-bin	68	6	
Spain	Pablo González	101	13	
Sweden	David Moberg Karlsson	71	19	
Switzerland	Louis Lurvink	64	7	
Togo	Francis Koné	52	6	Born in Ivory Coast, he represents Togo
Trinidad and Tobago	Dantaye Gilbert	28	2	
Tunisia	Tijani Belaïd	64	15	Born in France, he represents Tunisia
Turkey	Semih Kaya	28	2	
Turkmenistan	Ruslan Mingazow	86	19	
Uganda	Aziz Kayondo	65	2	
Ukraine	Taras Kacharaba	132	5	
United States	Diego Velasquez	17	0	
Uruguay	Rafael Acosta	73	9	
Uzbekistan	Aziz Ibragimov	38	1	
Venezuela	Eric Ramírez	38	3	
Zambia	Benson Sakala	74	3	
Zimbabwe	Kennedy Chihuri	200	25	

=== Appearances by age ===
Youngest players
Rank	Player	Club	Season	Age at first appearance
1	(Czech Republic) Dominik Mašek	Příbram	2010–11	15 years, 10 months, 18 days
2	(Czech Republic) Pavel Mezlík	Brno	1998–99	15 years, 10 months, 27 days
3	(Czech Republic) Patrik Svoboda	Kladno	2009–10	15 years, 11 months, 7 days

Oldest players
Rank	Player	Club	Season	Age at last appearance
1	(Czech Republic) Josef Jindřišek	Bohemians 1905	2024–25	44 years, 2 months, 20 days
2	(Czech Republic) Marek Matějovský	Mladá Boleslav	2024–25	43 years, 5 months, 5 days
3	(Czech Republic) Pavel Zavadil	Opava	2020–21	42 years, 7 months, 5 days

=== Most goals ===
Rank	Player	Goals	Matches	Years active	Clubs
1	(Czech Republic) David Lafata	198	418	1999–2018	České Budějovice, Jablonec, Sparta
2	(Czech Republic) Horst Siegl	134	310	1993–2006	Sparta, Příbram, Plzeň, Most
3	(Czech Republic) Libor Došek	125	407	1998–2016	Brno, Blšany, Liberec, Sparta, Teplice, Slovácko
4	(Czech Republic) Jan Chramosta	114	407	2009–	Mladá Boleslav, Plzeň, Jablonec, Bohemians 1905
5	(Czech Republic) Milan Škoda	104	346	2007–2025	Bohemians 1905, Slavia, Mladá Boleslav
6	(Czech Republic) Jakub Řezníček	99	356	2007–2025	Příbram, Mladá Boleslav, České Budějovice, Sparta, Brno, Plzeň, Olomouc, Teplice, Dukla
7	(Czech Republic) Stanislav Vlček	94	436	1993–2012	Bohemians 1905, České Budějovice, Olomouc, Slavia
8	(Czech Republic) Luděk Zelenka	92	342	1995–2009	Jablonec, Žižkov, Slavia, Teplice, Blšany, Brno, Bohemians 1905
9	(Czech Republic) Marek Kulič	88	389	1998–2014	Lázně Bohdaneč, Drnovice, Příbram, České Budějovice, Mladá Boleslav, Sparta, Hradec Králové
10	(Czech Republic) Martin Doležal	87	305	2008–2024	Jablonec, Olomouc, Karviná
10	(Czech Republic) Jan Kuchta	87	219	2015–2026	Slavia, Bohemians 1905, Slovácko, Teplice, Liberec, Sparta

=== Most goals (expatriate players) ===
Rank	Player	Goals	Matches	Years active	Clubs
1	(Bosnia and Herzegovina) Aidin Mahmutović	70	206	2008–2016	Teplice, Plzeň, Olomouc, Příbram
2	(Slovakia) Marek Bakoš	67	217	2009–2019	Plzeň, Liberec
3	(France) Jean-David Beauguel	66	194	2014–2022	Dukla, Zlín, Plzeň
4	(Slovakia) Ivan Schranz	51	214	2017–	Dukla, České Budějovice, Jablonec, Slavia
5	(Slovakia) Karol Kisel	49	279	2000–2013	Bohemians 1905, Liberec, Sparta, Slavia
6	(Bosnia and Herzegovina) Muris Mešanović	48	155	2012–2024	Jihlava, Slavia, Mladá Boleslav, Dukla
7	(Slovakia) Lukáš Haraslín	47	131	2021–2026	Sparta
8	(Russia) Nikolay Komlichenko	46	76	2016–2019	Liberec, Mladá Boleslav
9	(Brazil) Ewerton	43	139	2019–2025	Mladá Boleslav, Pardubice, Slavia, Ostrava
10	(Netherlands) Mick van Buren	40	195	2016–	Slavia, České Budějovice, Liberec, Hradec Králové

=== Goal scorers by age ===
Record	Player	Club	Season	Age
Youngest scorer	(Czech Republic) Adam Hložek	Sparta	2018–19	16 years, 7 months, 15 days
Oldest scorer	(Czech Republic) Josef Jindřišek	Bohemians 1905	2024–25	44 years, 2 months, 20 days

=== Fastest goals ===
Time (s)	Scorer	Match	Season
10.5	(Czech Republic) Vratislav Lokvenc	Liberec vs Hradec Králové 1–2	1993–94
11	(Switzerland) Mauro Lustrinelli	Sparta vs Jablonec 3–0	2005–06
12	(Czech Republic) Radek Voltr	Jablonec vs Karviná 5–3	2016–17

=== Most clean sheets ===
Rank	Player	Clean sheets	Matches	Years active	Clubs
1	(Czech Republic) Jaromír Blažek	157	401	1993–2015	Žižkov, Bohemians 1905, Slavia, Sparta, Příbram, Jihlava
2	(Czech Republic) Martin Vaniak	153	432	1993–2011	Olomouc, Drnovice, Most, Slavia
3	(Czech Republic) Tomáš Grigar	117	376	2005–2024	Sparta, Teplice
4	(Slovakia) Matúš Kozáčik	111	242	2003–2019	Slavia, Sparta, Plzeň
5	(Czech Republic) Tomáš Poštulka	110	309	1993–2008	Drnovice, Dukla, Hradec Králové, Sparta, Teplice, Plzeň
6	(Czech Republic) Michal Špit	101	300	2000–2016	Příbram, Sparta, Jablonec
7	(Czech Republic) Radek Černý	90	212	1994–2014	České Budějovice, Cheb, Slavia
7	(Czech Republic) Ondřej Kolář	90	187	2014–	Liberec, Slavia
7	(Czech Republic) Jan Laštůvka	90	275	2001–2023	Ostrava, Karviná
10	(Czech Republic) Petr Drobisz	88	289	1998–2014	Jablonec, Slovácko, Olomouc, Znojmo
10	(Czech Republic) Aleš Hruška	88	308	2008–2021	Žižkov, Příbram, Mladá Boleslav, Plzeň

=== Disciplinary ===
Most yellow cards
Rank	Player	Yellow cards	Matches	Years active	Clubs
1	(Czech Republic) Marek Matějovský	110	443	2001–2025	Jablonec, Mladá Boleslav, Sparta
2	(Bosnia and Herzegovina) Admir Ljevaković	106	306	2007–2022	Teplice
3	(Czech Republic) Pavel Horváth	97	426	1993–2015	Sparta, Jablonec, Slavia, Teplice, Plzeň

Most red cards
Rank	Player	Red cards	Matches	Years active	Clubs
1	(Czech Republic) Jaroslav Šilhavý	9	137	1993–1999	Slavia, Drnovice, Žižkov
1	(Czech Republic) Stanislav Marek	9	199	1993–2002	Liberec, České Budějovice
1	(Czech Republic) Marcel Mácha	9	235	1995–2008	Liberec, Příbram
1	(Czech Republic) Miloslav Penner	9	249	1995–2008	Slovácká Slavia Uherské Hradiště, FC Karviná, České Budějovice, Příbram, Zlín

== Most games coached ==
Rank	Manager	Matches	Points made	Years active	Clubs
1	(Czech Republic) Petr Rada	476	697	1997–2025	Slavia, Teplice, Jablonec, Liberec, Jihlava, Příbram, Sparta, Dukla
2	(Czech Republic) Petr Uličný	413	575	1993–2012	Zlín, Brno, Ostrava, Plzeň, Žižkov, Opava, Hradec Králové, Olomouc
3	(Czech Republic) Pavel Tobiáš	406	519	1993–2016	České Budějovice, Slavia, Brno, Příbram
4	(Czech Republic) Jindřich Trpišovský	383	853	2015–	Liberec, Slavia
5	(Czech Republic) Karel Jarolím	373	618	1997–2022	Příbram, Slavia, Slovácko, Mladá Boleslav
6	(Czech Republic) Luboš Kozel	368	509	2007–	Jablonec, Dukla, Ostrava, Liberec
7	(Czech Republic) Karel Večeřa	347	480	1993–2011	Brno, Drnovice, Jihlava, Ostrava
8	(Czech Republic) Jiří Kotrba	342	481	1993–2015	Žižkov, Jablonec, Příbram, Olomouc, Sparta, Brno, České Budějovice, Liberec
9	(Czech Republic) Zdeněk Ščasný	339	556	1997–2019	Sparta, Žižkov, Most, Mladá Boleslav, Teplice
9	(Czech Republic) Pavel Vrba	339	655	2002–2023	Ostrava, Plzeň, Sparta, Zlín

== Match records ==
Record	Match	Score	Season
Highest scoring	Zlín–Mladá Boleslav	5–9	2023–24
Biggest home win	Slavia–Slovácká Slavia Uherské Hradiště	9–1	1995–96
Biggest away win	Teplice–Mladá Boleslav	0–8	2018–19
Highest scoring draw	Jablonec–Znojmo	5–5	2013–14
Highest scoring draw	Teplice–Plzeň	5–5	2026–27

== All-time table ==
After the 2025–26 season.

The table counts all the seasons since the Czech First League was founded in 1993. Highlighted teams compete in the 2026–27 Czech First League.

Pos	Team	S	Pld	W	D	L	GF	GA	GD	Pts	Level (2026–27)
1	AC Sparta Prague	33	1029	644	214	171	1960	881	+1079	2128	1st tier
2	SK Slavia Prague	33	1029	582	254	193	1832	908	+924	1984	1st tier
3	FC Viktoria Plzeň	29	909	454	211	244	1431	989	+442	1561	1st tier
4	FC Slovan Liberec	33	1020	428	281	311	1370	1131	+239	1554	1st tier
5	FK Jablonec	32	999	392	280	327	1353	1193	+160	1401	1st tier
6	SK Sigma Olomouc	31	959	362	267	330	1231	1139	+92	1339	1st tier
7	FC Baník Ostrava	32	1000	352	282	366	1321	1271	+50	1324	1st tier
8	FK Teplice	30	933	326	266	341	1140	1183	−43	1244	1st tier
9	FK Mladá Boleslav	22	696	271	184	241	1031	940	+91	997	1st tier
10	1. FC Slovácko	24	756	254	199	303	868	970	−102	961	1st tier
11	FC Zbrojovka Brno	26	789	255	206	328	914	1069	−155	961	1st tier
12	Bohemians 1905	24	754	216	213	325	781	1043	−262	853	1st tier
13	SK Dynamo České Budějovice	24	740	200	196	344	768	1160	−392	785	3rd tier
14	FK Příbram	22	672	191	172	309	697	986	−289	745	2nd tier
15	FC Zlín	20	631	173	172	286	637	915	−278	681	1st tier
16	FC Hradec Králové	19	593	171	158	264	589	815	−226	662	1st tier
17	FK Viktoria Žižkov	14	420	144	106	170	478	539	−61	526	2nd tier
18	FK Drnovice	10	300	114	67	119	392	398	−6	396	Dissolved in 2006
19	FK Dukla Prague (Note: Includes 1993–94 season played by the original Dukla Prague club.)	11	345	90	97	158	382	526	−144	366	2nd tier
20	SFC Opava	11	342	83	89	170	347	532	−185	338	2nd tier
21	MFK Karviná	9	298	74	74	150	334	485	−151	296	2nd tier
22	FK Chmel Blšany	8	240	67	63	110	255	350	−95	264	Dissolved in 2016
23	FK Pardubice	6	206	64	43	99	227	326	−99	235	1st tier
24	FC Vysočina Jihlava	7	210	55	61	94	221	315	−94	226	2nd tier
25	SK Kladno	4	120	28	30	62	99	173	−74	114	2nd tier
26	FC Union Cheb	3	90	29	26	35	95	121	−26	100	4th tier
27	FK SIAD Most	3	90	19	30	41	96	140	−44	87	Dissolved in 2016
28	FK Bohemians Prague	2	60	14	8	38	60	111	−51	50	Dissolved in 2016
29	FC Karviná	2	60	12	12	36	53	105	−52	48	Merged with MFK Karviná in 2008
30	1. SC Znojmo FK	1	30	6	9	15	32	49	−17	27	4th tier
31	FK Ústí nad Labem	1	30	4	7	19	22	67	−45	19	2nd tier
32	Slovácká Slavia Uherské Hradiště	1	30	3	8	19	19	65	−46	17	Merged with Slovácko in 2000
33	MFK Vítkovice	1	30	3	7	20	22	64	−42	13	3rd tier
34	FK Švarc Benešov	1	30	3	3	24	23	78	−55	12	3rd tier
35	AFK Atlantic Lázně Bohdaneč	1	30	2	5	23	18	61	−43	11	Dissolved in 2000
36	SK Artis Brno	0	0	0	0	0	0	0	0	0	1st tier

- Point deductions are not counted in this historical table (2004–05: 1. FC Slovácko −12, SFC Opava −6, Slovan Liberec −6; 2009–10: FK Bohemians Prague −15; 2011–12: Sigma Olomouc −9).
- A win was awarded with 2 points in the 1993–94 season.
