= René Bolf =

Czech footballer (born 1974)

Personal information
- Date of birth: 25 February 1974 (age 52)
- Place of birth: Valašské Meziříčí, Czechoslovakia
- Height: 1.87 m (6 ft 2 in)
- Position: Centre-back

Youth career
- 1981–1990: Rožnov pod Radhoštěm
- 1990–1993: FC Vítkovice
- 1993: VTJ Hranice
- 1994: LeRK Brno

Senior career*
Years	Team	Apps	(Gls)
1994–1995	FC Karviná	25	(2)
1995–1999	Baník Ostrava	61	(4)
1999–2000	Sparta Prague	26	(3)
2000–2004	Baník Ostrava	96	(12)
2004–2007	Auxerre	38	(5)
2007–2011	Baník Ostrava	78	(8)
2011–2012	MFK Karviná	29	(1)
Total		353	(35)

International career
2000–2005	Czech Republic	34	(0)
Medal record
Men's football
Representing Czech Republic
UEFA European Championship
Bronze medal – third place	2004 Portugal
- * Club domestic league appearances and goals

René Bolf (born 25 February 1974) is a Czech former professional footballer who played as a centre back. He spent most of his club career at Baník Ostrava, also playing in his home country for Sparta Prague. During a three-year stay in France, he played for Ligue 1 side Auxerre.

He spent most of his Czech First League career at FC Baník Ostrava, where he played over 200 league matches. He was a member of the squad of Baník Ostrava in the 2003–04 season, when Baník won the league title. Bolf represented the national team between 2000 and 2005 and represented the Czech Republic at Euro 2004.

== Club career ==
Bolf played for a club in Rožnov pod Radhoštěm as a child, moving to FC Vítkovice in 1990 and Hranice in 1993. After a short spell at LeRK Brno in 1994, he started his professional football career at FC Karviná.

He moved to Ostrava in 1995, playing with Baník Ostrava until a summer 1999 move to Sparta Prague. He won the Czech First League with Sparta in his first season with the club, but returned to his former club, Ostrava, during the following season. The November 2000 deal which saw Bolf and teammate Martin Prohászka transferred to Ostrava was valued at 17.5 million CZK, and saw Bolf sign a three-year contract. He was appointed captain of Baník Ostrava in 2002 following the departure from the club of Milan Baroš. His first league title with Ostrava, and second overall came during the 2003–04 season. He moved to France in 2004, joining Ligue 1 side Auxerre as a replacement for outgoing defender Philippe Mexès. He stayed with Auxerre for three seasons.

Bolf returned to the Czech Republic in 2007. Due to injury, he didn't play his first league match after returning from France until March 2008. He spent four more seasons with Baník Ostrava, before playing out his career in the Czech 2. Liga with Karviná. He announced his retirement from professional football in December 2012 after the first half of the 2012–13 Czech 2. Liga.

== International career ==
Bolf made his debut for the Czech Republic national team on 16 August 2000 in a friendly match against Slovenia. It was April 2002 before he won his second cap, playing the whole of a goalless friendly match against Greece. He went on to play eight matches in the qualifying competition for Euro 2004.

At UEFA Euro 2004 he played the whole match in the Czech Republic's opening game against Latvia. After not featuring in his country's second game, against the Netherlands, Bolf returned to the starting lineup against Germany. He played the whole match as the Czech Republic won 2–1 and knocked Germany out of the tournament. Bolf was one of only three players who started against Germany to be selected in the quarter-final match against Denmark. He didn't finish the match, having sustained an injury he was replaced by David Rozehnal in the 64th minute. Bolf's fitness was unclear before the semi-final match against Greece, but he played the whole game, which the Czech Republic lost after a silver goal.

== Personal life ==
Bolf was born in Valašské Meziříčí. He is married to wife Vladislava, with two daughters.

== Honours ==
Sparta Prague

- Czech First League: 1999–2000

Baník Ostrava

- Czech First League: 2003–04
