= Peter Gabriel (disambiguation) =

Peter Gabriel (born 1950) is an English progressive rock musician, formerly of Genesis. It is also the name of four eponymous albums:

- Peter Gabriel (1977 album), his first album, nicknamed Car
- Peter Gabriel (1978 album), his second album, nicknamed Scratch
- Peter Gabriel (1980 album), his third album, nicknamed Melt and Intruder
- Peter Gabriel (1982 album), his fourth album, titled Security in the United States

== See also ==
- Pierre Gabriel, French mathematician who also used the name "Peter Gabriel"
- Petr Gabriel, Czech footballer
