= Ticháček =

Ticháček (feminine Ticháčková) is a Czech surname. Notable people with the name include:

- Jiří Ticháček, Czech orienteering competitor
- Josef Tichatschek, Bohemian opera singer
- Lukáš Ticháček (born 1982), Czech volleyball player
- Martin Ticháček (born 1981), Czech football coach and a former player
