= Milan Fukal =

Czech footballer (born 1975)

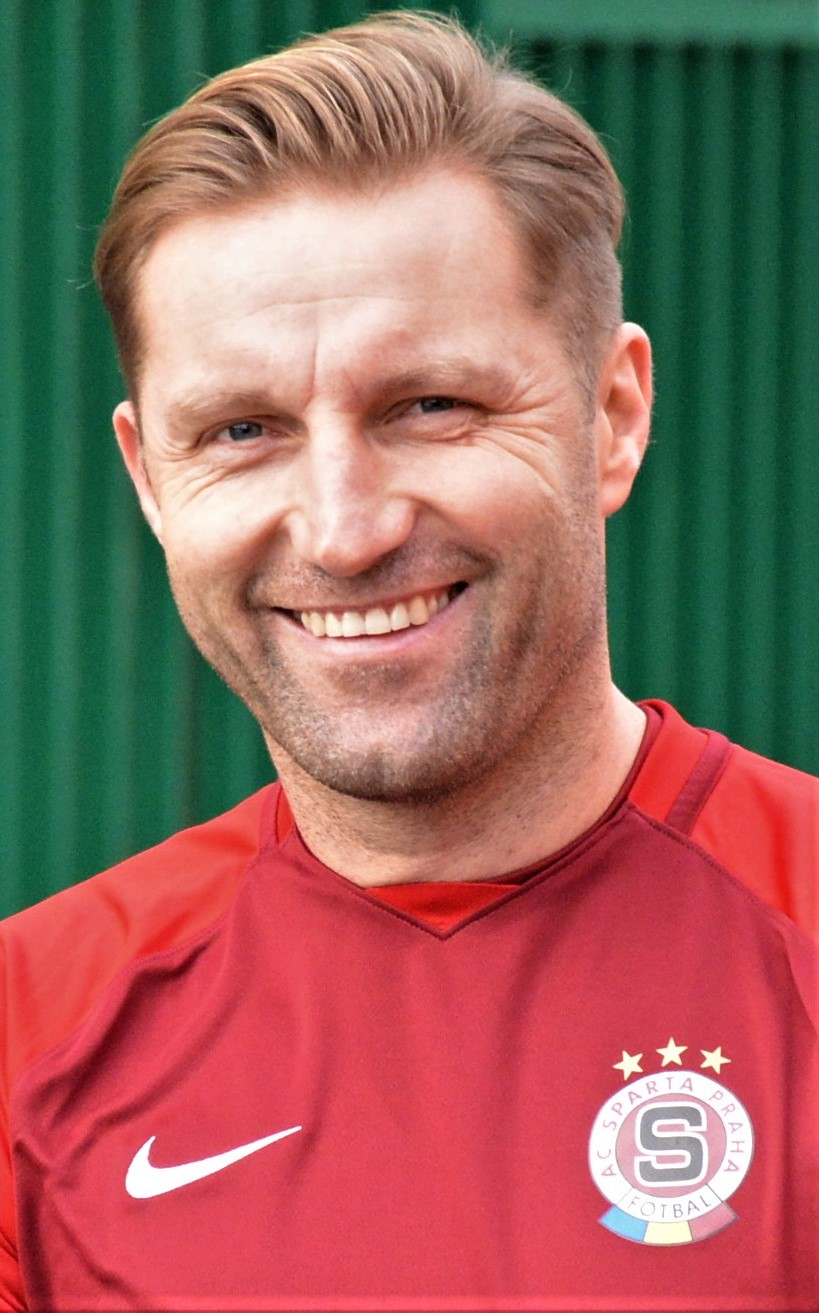
- Milan Fukal (2018)

Personal information
- Date of birth: 16 May 1975 (age 51)
- Place of birth: Jablonec nad Nisou, Czechoslovakia
- Height: 1.88 m (6 ft 2 in)
- Position: Defender

Youth career
- 1981–1988: Sokol Kokonín
- 1988–1993: FK Jablonec

Senior career*
Years	Team	Apps	(Gls)
1993–1994	VTJ Karlovy Vary		
1994	EMĚ Mělník	12	(0)
1995	SK Český Brod	17	(1)
1995	Pelikán Děčín	16	(4)
1996	Bohemians Praha	14	(4)
1996–1999	FK Jablonec	76	(9)
1999–2000	Sparta Prague	31	(7)
2000–2004	Hamburger SV	67	(8)
2004–2006	Borussia Mönchengladbach	42	(1)
2006–2008	FK Jablonec 97	43	(3)
2008–2011	Kapfenberger SV	87	(5)
2011–2013	FC Hradec Králové	47	(1)
2013–2018	SV Esternberg	116	(3)

International career
1996–1997	Czech Republic U-21	7	(0)
1997–2003	Czech Republic	19	(2)
- * Club domestic league appearances and goals

Milan Fukal (born 16 May 1975, in Jablonec nad Nisou) is a Czech former professional footballer.

The defender played for FK Jablonec between 1996 and 1999, scoring twice for the club at the start of the 1999–2000 Czech First League before signing for Sparta Prague. He represented the Czech national team, for which he won 19 caps and scored two goals.

Fukal signed for Bundesliga team Hamburger SV in August 2000, for a fee reported as 5.75 million Deutsche Marks. Before the 2004–05 season, he moved to Borussia Mönchengladbach, signing a three-year contract. Having made a total of 109 appearances in the Bundesliga and having scored 9 goals there, he returned to the Czech Republic in September 2006 to play for his former club Jablonec.

After the 2007–08 season, Fukal left Jablonec for Austrian first league club Kapfenberger SV. Fukal again returned to the Czech Republic in 2011, signing a one-year contract with FC Hradec Králové. He continued with Hradec and was team captain until being dropped from their first team squad six matches from the end of the 2012–13 season, which culminated in his team's relegation.
