= Pavel Novotný =

Czech footballer and coach

Personal information
- Date of birth: 14 September 1973 (age 53)
- Place of birth: Kroměříž, Czechoslovakia
- Height: 1.95 m (6 ft 5 in)
- Position: Defensive midfielder

Youth career
- 1985–1988: Spartak Hulín
- 1988–1991: FC Zlín

Senior career*
Years	Team	Apps	(Gls)
1991–1997	Slavia Prague	105	(16)
1992–1993	→ Union Cheb (loan)		
1997–1998	VfL Wolfsburg	15	(0)
1998–2001	Sparta Prague	47	(3)
2001–2003	Slavia Prague	7	(0)
2003–2005	FC Bohemians Praha	5	(0)
2005–2006	SC Xaverov	11	(0)

International career
1993–1996	Czech Republic U21	18	(8)
1996–1999	Czech Republic	2	(0)
Medal record
Men's football
Representing Czech Republic
UEFA European Championship
Runner-up	1996 England
SK Slavia Prague
Winner	Gambrinus liga	1995–96
- * Club domestic league appearances and goals

Pavel Novotný (born 14 September 1973 in Kroměříž) is a Czech former professional footballer who played as a defensive midfielder. He made two appearances for the Czech Republic, with which he participated at the UEFA Euro 1996 in England. During his career he played at a number of clubs, including Union Cheb, SK Slavia Prague, VfL Wolfsburg, AC Sparta Prague, FC Bohemians Praha and SC Xaverov. In present time, he is a coach at Bohemians Praha.
