= Josef Obajdin =

Czech footballer

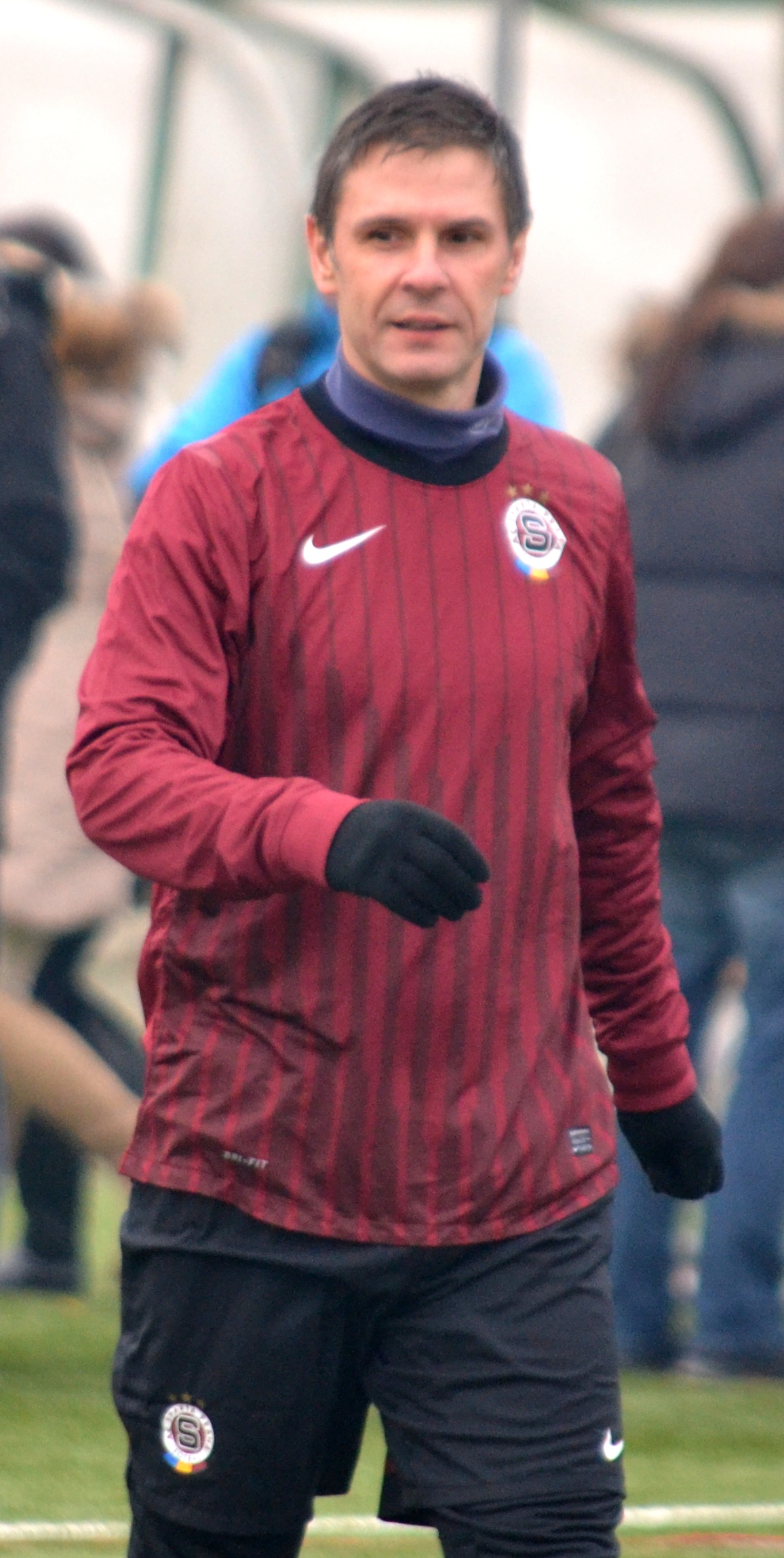

Personal information
- Date of birth: 7 November 1970 (age 55)
- Place of birth: Poděbrady, Czechoslovakia
- Height: 1.76 m (5 ft 9 in)
- Position: Striker

Youth career
- 1976–1984: TJ SB Poděbrady
- 1984–1989: Sparta Prague

Senior career*
Years	Team	Apps	(Gls)
1989–1991	VTJ Tábor		
1991	Škoda Plzeň		
1991–1992	Dukla Prague	5	(0)
1992	SK Poldi Kladno		
1993–1994	Slovan Liberec	42	(21)
1995	Eintracht Frankfurt	3	(0)
1995	Slovan Liberec	14	(5)
1996–2001	Sparta Prague	146	(29)
2002	Omonia Nicosia	13	(2)
2002	Sparta Prague	7	(2)
2003	Bohemians Prague	10	(0)
2003–2004	Sparta Prague B	9	(1)
2005	Slovan Varnsdorf		
2006–2007	Wisła Płock	17	(2)
2007–2008	Slovan Varnsdorf		
2008–2009	Arsenal Česká Lípa	13	(1)

International career
1995	Czech Republic	1	(0)
- * Club domestic league appearances and goals

Josef Obajdin (born 7 November 1970) is a Czech former professional footballer who played as a striker. The best years of his career he spent in Sparta Prague where he was many times a champion of the Czech Republic. Obajdin played once for the Czech Republic national football team.

== Career ==
Obajdin was born in Poděbrady. Until age of 15, he played for the youth team of his city's team, TJ SB Poděbrady. Then he continued to play in 1984 for Sparta Prague youth team. From 1989 until 1991, he was a member of the senior squad of VTJ Tábor. During the 1991–92 season, he played for Škoda Plzeň, however in the middle of the season he was transferred to Dukla Prague, for which he played his five first league matches. The following season, he began playing for SK Poldi Kladno in the Czech 2. Liga, however he was transferred soon to Slovan Liberec, and helped them to promotion to the Czech Liga.

In Liberec, he performed well, scoring 11 goals in 28 matches in 1993–94 and 10 goals in 14 matches in 1994–95. This caused the interest of Eintracht Frankfurt and they signed him at the middle of the 1994–95 season. In the Bundesliga he played only three games due to injury problems. He returned again to play for his previous team, Slovan Liberec, for the first half year of the 1995–96 season and transferred in January 1996 to Sparta Prague.

There, Obajdin remained five years and scored 26 goals in 146 games and winning five consecutive times the Czech Championship. Although he was in a good form, he was reserve during the 2001–02 season with the new trainer Jaroslav and changed team in January 2002 by being transferred to the Cypriot team Omonia Nicosia, where he played for the rest of the season without success. After half a year, Obajdin went back to Prague, to play for his previous team, but did not manage to secure a place in the squad and was loaned to Bohemians Prague where he did not score in ten games. Back in Sparta, he was used only in the second-class B-team.

When Obajdin's contract ran out for Sparta in 2004, the nearly 34-year-old player was in the meantime without club. He was free agent for half a year, but signed for Slovan Varnsdorf in spring 2005. At the beginning of 2006, he signed for the Polish team Wisła Płock, where he played until January 2007, when he was released. He returned to Varnsdorf a few months later.

== Honours ==
Sparta Prague

- Czech First League: 1996–97, 1997–98, 1998–99, 1999–2000, 2000–01
- Czech Cup: 1995–96

Wisła Płock

- Polish Cup: 2005–06
- Polish Super Cup: 2006
