= Miroslav Baranek =

Czech footballer (born 1973)

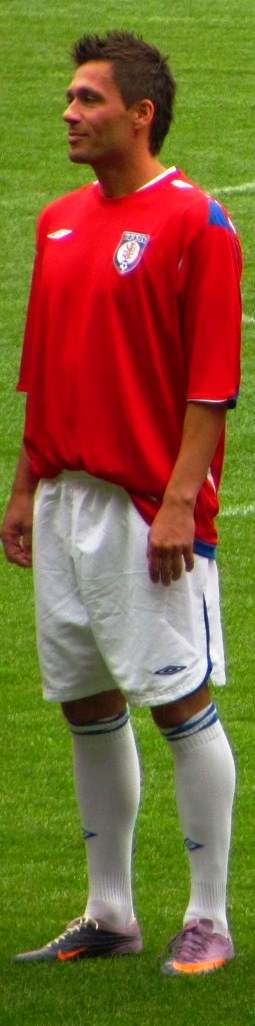

Personal information
- Date of birth: 10 November 1973 (age 53)
- Place of birth: Havířov, Czechoslovakia
- Height: 1.79 m (5 ft 10 in)
- Position: Midfielder

Youth career
- 1981–1984: TJ Horní Suchá
- 1984–1992: Baník Havířov

Senior career*
Years	Team	Apps	(Gls)
1992–1994	TJ Vítkovice	44	(2)
1994–1995	LeRK Brno		
1995–1997	SK Sigma Olomouc	61	(21)
1997–2000	Sparta Prague	79	(25)
2000–2002	1. FC Köln	37	(3)
2002–2004	Sparta Prague	21	(3)
2005	FK Mladá Boleslav	12	(0)
2005–2008	FK Jablonec	75	(6)
2008–2009	VfB Admira Wacker Mödling	5	(0)
2009–2011	ASK Kottingbrunn		
2011	SC Laa/Thaya		
2011–2012	SK Prostějov		

International career
1993–1996	Czech Republic U-21	8	(1)
1995–2002	Czech Republic	17	(5)
- * Club domestic league appearances and goals

Miroslav Baranek (born 10 November 1973) is a Czech former professional footballer, who serves as a team manager at Sparta Prague. He played top-tier football domestically for Vítkovice, Sigma Olomouc, Sparta Prague, Mladá Boleslav, and FK Jablonec. He played abroad in Germany and Austria.

== Honours ==
Sparta Prague

- Czech First League: 1997–98, 1998–99, 1999–2000, 2002–03, 2004–05; runner-up 2003–04
- Czech Cup: 2003–04

Sigma Olomouc

- Czech First League runner-up: 1995–96
