= Lubomír Puček =

Czech former football referee (born 1961)

- Born: 1 June 1961 (age 65); Czechoslovakia

Domestic
Years	League	Role

International
Years	League	Role

Lubomír Puček (born 1 June 1961) is a Czech former football referee. He refereed the final of the 2002–2003 Czech Cup.

In 2003, he took charge of a Slovak Superliga match between Banská Bystrica and Púchov. In March 2006, Regional court of Ostrava Region declared Puček was guilty of accepting bribe for fixing this match, and was fined 70,000 CZK.

Puček is known to have officiated in FIFA matches during the period from 1994 to 1999. He served as a referee in qualifying matches for Euro 1996 and Euro 2000.
