= Martin Prohászka =

Slovak footballer

Personal information
- Date of birth: 18 August 1973 (age 53)
- Place of birth: Nové Zámky, Czechoslovakia
- Height: 1.88 m (6 ft 2 in)
- Position: Striker

Youth career
- FK Nové Zámky

Senior career*
| Years | Team | Apps | (Gls) |
| 1992–1997 | FC Nitra | 48 | (4) |
| 1997–1998 | SFC Opava | 29 | (9) |
| 1998 | Košice (loan) | 13 | (3) |
| 1999–2000 | Sparta Prague | 23 | (5) |
| 2000–2003 | FC Baník Ostrava | 59 | (11) |
| 2004–2005 | FK Viktoria Žižkov | 37 | (12) |
| 2005–2006 | Tractor Sazi F.C. | | |
| 2006–2007 | Jakubčovice Fotbal | 37 | (10) |
| 2007–2010 | FC Vítkovice | 25 | (7) |
| 2010–2011 | FK Mikulovice | | |

International career
| 1999–2000 | Slovakia | 3 | (0) |
- * Club domestic league appearances and goals

Martin Prohászka (born 18 August 1973) is a Slovak former football player.

Prohászka played for FC Nitra, appearing in 48 league matches, before moving to the Czech Republic to play for SFC Opava in 1997. Prohászka played eventually for Sparta Prague, where he won the Gambrinus liga title. From Sparta, he moved to Baník Ostrava, where he spent several seasons and the first half of Baník's championship 2003-2004 season. For the second half of the season, Prohászka moved to Viktoria Žižkov. His last club was Second League's FC Vítkovice. In January 2010 Prohászka ended his professional career.
