= Jiří Kotrba =

Czech footballer and manager (born 1958)

Personal information
- Date of birth: 28 February 1958 (age 68)
- Place of birth: Písek, Czechoslovakia
- Position: Defender

Youth career
- 1964–1976: ZVVZ Milevsko

Senior career*
Years	Team	Apps	(Gls)
1976–1981	Bohemians Prague	53	(1)
1981–1982	→ VTJ Tábor (loan)		
1982–1988	Dynamo České Budějovice		

Managerial career
- 1983–1989: Dynamo České Budějovice (youth)
- 1989–1991: Dynamo České Budějovice
- 1991–1993: Union Cheb
- 1993: FK Jablonec
- 1993–1995: Viktoria Žižkov
- 1995–1998: FK Jablonec
- 1998–2002: Marila Příbram
- 2002: Sigma Olomouc
- 2002–2004: Sparta Prague
- 2004–2005: 1. FC Brno
- 2007: Marila Příbram
- 2008: Czech Republic U-21
- 2011: Dynamo České Budějovice
- 2014–2015: Slovan Liberec
- * Club domestic league appearances and goals

Jiří Kotrba (born 28 February 1958) is a Czech football manager and former player.

As a manager Kotrba led several Czech clubs, gaining success with some of them. In the 2002/2003 season he won the Czech First League with Sparta Prague. In 1994 Kotrba won the Czech Cup with Viktoria Žižkov, in 1998 he won the cup with FK Jablonec.

In June 2011, Kotrba returned to club management after a four-year break to replace Jaroslav Šilhavý as manager of České Budějovice. His return was, however, short-lived, as after overseeing a winless start to the 2011–12 Czech First League during which his team took no points from the opening five games, he was replaced as head coach by František Cipro, with Kotrba staying at the club in the role of general manager.
