= Vratislav Lokvenc =

Czech footballer (born 1973)

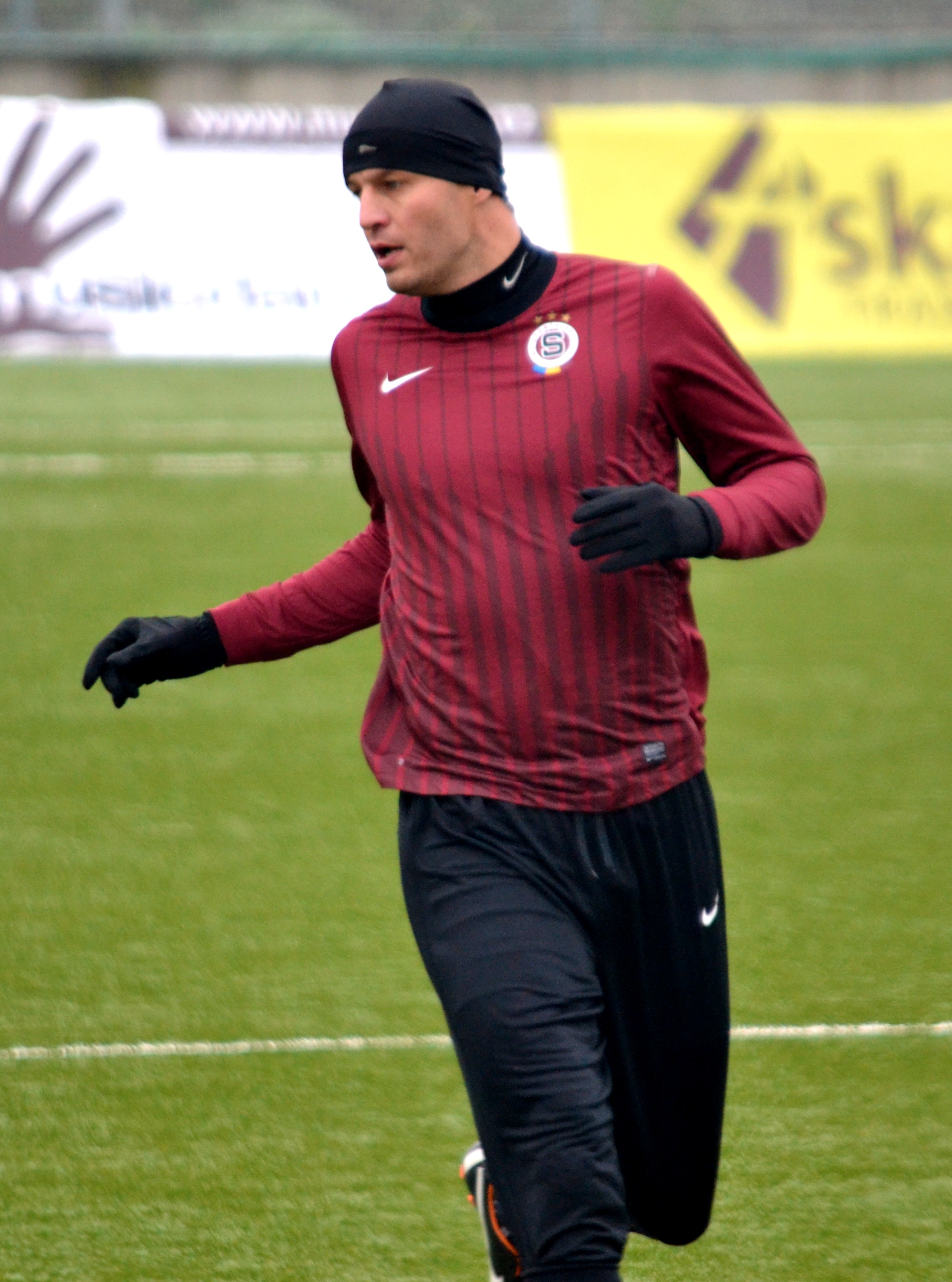
- Lokvenc in 2013

Personal information
- Full name: Vratislav Lokvenc
- Date of birth: 27 September 1973 (age 53)
- Place of birth: Náchod, Czechoslovakia
- Height: 1.96 m (6 ft 5 in)
- Position: Forward

Youth career
- 1980–1986: Náchod
- 1986–1992: Hradec Králové

Senior career*
Years	Team	Apps	(Gls)
1992–1994	Hradec Králové	55	(8)
1994–2000	Sparta Prague	163	(74)
2000–2004	1. FC Kaiserslautern	116	(36)
2004–2005	VfL Bochum	32	(10)
2005–2008	Red Bull Salzburg	45	(8)
2008	→ FC Basel (loan)	6	(0)
2008–2009	FC Ingolstadt	23	(6)
Total		440	(142)

International career
1993–1996	Czech Republic U21	13	(7)
1995–2006	Czech Republic	74	(14)
Medal record
Men's football
Representing Czech Republic
UEFA European Championship
Bronze medal – third place	2004 Portugal
- * Club domestic league appearances and goals

Vratislav Lokvenc (Czech pronunciation: [ˈvracɪslaf ˈlokvɛnts], born 27 September 1973) is a Czech former professional footballer who played as a forward. After playing youth football for Náchod and Hradec Králové, he began his senior club career with the latter team. After moving to Sparta Prague he won five league titles and one cup, as well as the 1999–2000 league top scorer award. He subsequently played abroad, playing club football in Germany, Austria and Switzerland for 1. FC Kaiserslautern, VfL Bochum, Red Bull Salzburg, FC Basel and FC Ingolstadt 04. He retired in 2009.

Lokvenc played international football for the Czech Republic. He played at the 1997 FIFA Confederations Cup before going on to take part in three major competitions. He made three substitute appearances at Euro 2000 and played in one game at Euro 2004. His last international tournament was the 2006 World Cup, where he played in two group matches before missing the third through suspension. The Czech Republic did not qualify for the next round of the competition and Lokvenc subsequently retired from international football in 2006.

== Club career ==
=== Early success ===
Lokvenc was born into a football family; his father, also named Vratislav Lokvenc, played club football for FK Ústí nad Labem in the second football league of Czechoslovakia and later Náchod.

Born in 1973, Lokvenc started his professional career during the 1992–93 season with Hradec Králové, joining Sparta Prague in October 1994. He featured in the 1995–96 UEFA Cup for Sparta, scoring the first goal and providing the pass for the second in a 2–1 win against Danish club Silkeborg IF, whereby Sparta qualified on the away goals rule for the second round. He scored a goal shortly after entering the game as a substitute in a first round match of the 1996–97 UEFA Cup Winners' Cup against Austrian side Sturm Graz; the match finished 2–2.

Lokvenc spent six seasons at Sparta Prague, with whom he won five league titles and the 1995–96 Czech Cup. In March 2000, in a match against České Budějovice, Lokvenc scored four times for Sparta as the match finished 4–1. In doing so he became the third player in the Czech era to score four times in the same match, after Josef Obajdin and Robert Vágner. Lokvenc scored twice in the Prague derby match against Slavia Prague in May 2000, in a 5–1 win which secured the league title for Sparta. He was top scorer of the Czech First League in the 1999–2000 season with 22 goals, tying the league record, which stood until David Lafata scored 25 goals during the 2011–12 season.

=== Germany ===
Lokvenc joined 1. FC Kaiserslautern of the German Bundesliga in 2000, agreeing to the move before the 2000 European Championship. Around the same time, a daughter was born to Lokvenc in May 2000. He scored six goals in an 11–1 friendly match win against an amateur side before the start of the season. In December 2000 Lokvenc scored in the UEFA Cup against Rangers, helping his team qualify for the last 16 of the competition. In the following round Kaiserslautern were paired with Slavia Prague; after the first match had finished goalless, Lokvenc scored the only goal in the second leg of their two-legged tie to eliminate the Czech team. He scored a hat-trick in the 2002–03 DFB-Pokal quarter-final against Bochum, a game which finished 3–3 but was won by Kaiserslautern after a penalty shoot-out. Lokvenc played in the final of the competition at the end of May 2003, but his side were beaten 3–1 by league winners Bayern Munich as the latter claimed the double.

Kaiserslautern announced that Lokvenc would be sold in April 2004, citing his salary demands as reasons for his sale. He joined VfL Bochum of the Bundesliga in the summer of 2004, agreeing the transfer before the European Championships. Bochum were relegated from the league after 33 games of the 34-game season, with Lokvenc scoring his tenth goal of the season in a 2–0 win at third placed Stuttgart.

=== Late career ===
Lokvenc signed for Red Bull Salzburg in the summer of 2005, rejecting offers from Portsmouth and Hertha Berlin. He described his move to Salzburg as "the best transfer of my life", arriving around the same time as Germany national team players Thomas Linke and Alexander Zickler. Lokvenc only played four league matches in his first season with the club before requiring surgery on an injury to his right knee in November. He returned to the team in May 2006, taking part in a match for the first time since July 2005, as he made an appearance as a substitute in a 2–1 home loss against Pasching. The club finished the season as league runners-up, behind Austria Vienna.

Lokvenc scored his first league goal of the 2006–07 Austrian Football Bundesliga in a December match against Altach, levelling the scores as the game finished 1–1. The club went on to win the league in April 2007 with five matches of the season remaining.

In October 2007 Lokvenc scored the only goal in Salzburg's 1–0 UEFA Cup first round win against AEK Athens This was not enough for his team to advance, having lost 3–0 in the first leg of their two-legged tie. Lokvenc featured less for Salzburg in the 2007–08 season, prompting him to join Swiss Super League team Basel on loan in February 2008 for the remainder of the season. He scored in Basel's 1–0 semi-final Swiss Cup victory against Thun. The club went on to win the 2008 league championship title and the 2008 Swiss Cup.

Lokvenc returned to Germany in the summer of 2008, joining Ingolstadt of the 2. Bundesliga. On 17 August 2008, the Czech played his first competitive match for FC Ingolstadt in a 3–2 victory against SpVgg Greuther Fürth on the first matchday of the second German Bundesliga. Lokvenc scored his first two goals on 5 October 2008 in a 4–2 win on the seventh matchday against Hansa Rostock (a relegated team from the Bundesliga). Vratislav Lokvenc played in 23 games and scored six goals. Nevertheless, FC Ingolstadt relegated from the second German Bundesliga at the end of the season. After the relegation, Lokvenc left the Bavarians and retires.

=== Post-playing career ===
After finishing his professional playing career, Lokvenc worked as a scout in the Czech Republic and Slovakia for his former team, Basel. He also played football in the amateur Czech Fourth Division for Union Čelákovice. He continued to be physically active after his football career, taking part in the 2010 Prague Half Marathon in the same field as former international teammate Pavel Nedvěd. He was again involved in the Prague Half Marathon in 2015, taking part in a relay alongside Nedvěd, fellow footballer Tomáš Hübschman and 2014 Miss Czech Republic, Tereza Skoumalová.

== International career ==
Lokvenc represented his country at under-21 level, scoring seven goals in 13 matches between 1993 and 1995.

He first played for the senior Czech national team in 1995. Lokvenc was part of the Czech Republic squad at the 1997 FIFA Confederations Cup in Saudi Arabia. He took part as a substitute in the group stage match against United Arab Emirates and started the third place play-off game versus Uruguay, which the Czech Republic won to finish third overall in the tournament.

=== Euro 2000 ===
At Euro 2000, Lokvenc made a substitute appearance in the Czech Republic's opening game against the Netherlands, replacing Pavel Nedvěd after 89 minutes as the match resulted in a 1–0 win for the Dutch. He replaced Radek Bejbl in the second group match, against France, coming on after 49 minutes in the 2–1 loss. Lokvenc appeared in the third group match against Denmark, although due to both teams having lost both of their previous matches, neither team could advance to the next round of the competition. He came on after 79 minutes, replacing Vladimír Šmicer in a 2–0 win for his nation.

=== Euro 2004 ===
Lokvenc scored twice as a substitute in a June 2003 qualification match against Moldova, scoring both goals with his head in a 5–0 win for his country.

He played in one match at Euro 2004. He started the group match against Germany among a group of players which was described by the BBC as "very much a Czech second string", but failed to score and was replaced by Milan Baroš after 59 minutes. The Czech Republic won the match, 2–1.

=== 2006 World Cup ===
During the qualification process for the forthcoming World Cup, Lokvenc scored five goals for his country. In a November 2004 match, away at Macedonia, he entered the game in the 76th minute as a substitute for Zdeněk Grygera with the game goalless. He scored the first goal of the game with his head, before Jan Koller made the score 2–0 to win the match. In March 2005, Lokvenc again scored the deciding goal, this time against Finland in Teplice. In a game in which the Czechs had led 3–1, Finland scored twice to level the scores, however Lokvenc made the score 4–3 with three minutes remaining. Four days later, Lokvenc scored another goal, heading in a cross from Baroš, in a 4–0 away win against Andorra. In June of the same year, Lokvenc scored the first and last goals for his nation in an 8–1 home win, also against Andorra.

At the 2006 World Cup, Lokvenc replaced the injured Jan Koller as a substitute in the first group match, against the USA. He didn't score but received a yellow card as his nation won 3–0. He started the second group match, against Ghana, in the absence of fellow strikers Koller and Baroš due to injury. He received another yellow card in the match, which Ghana won 2–0. Due to having received two yellow cards, he was suspended for his country's final group match, against Italy. The Czech Republic lost to Italy and therefore failed to progress to the next stage of the competition. Lokvenc announced his retirement from international football in September 2006, becoming the third player from the World Cup team to retire after Karel Poborský and Pavel Nedvěd. He finished his international career with figures of 14 goals in 74 matches.

== Style of play ==
Lokvenc was particularly noted for his height, being referred to as a "towering forward", and having "a similar aerial threat" to international teammate Jan Koller. His strength was noted as another of his assets.

== Career statistics ==
=== Club ===
Appearances and goals by club, season and competition
Club	Season	League		
Club	Season	Division	Apps	Goals
Fomei Hradec Králové	1992–93	Czechoslovak First League	17	0
Fomei Hradec Králové	1993–94	Czech First League	29	5
Fomei Hradec Králové	1994–95	Czech First League	9	3
Fomei Hradec Králové	Total		55	8
Sparta Prague	1994–95	Czech First League	21	8
Sparta Prague	1995–96	Czech First League	29	9
Sparta Prague	1996–97	Czech First League	30	12
Sparta Prague	1997–98	Czech First League	29	12
Sparta Prague	1998–99	Czech First League	29	11
Sparta Prague	1999–00	Czech First League	25	22
Sparta Prague	Total		163	74
1. FC Kaiserslautern	2000–01	Bundesliga	30	9
1. FC Kaiserslautern	2001–02	Bundesliga	31	11
1. FC Kaiserslautern	2002–03	Bundesliga	30	8
1. FC Kaiserslautern	2003–04	Bundesliga	25	8
1. FC Kaiserslautern	Total		116	36
VfL Bochum	2004–05	Bundesliga	32	10
Red Bull Salzburg	2005–06	Austrian Bundesliga	5	0
Red Bull Salzburg	2006–07	Austrian Bundesliga	23	6
Red Bull Salzburg	2007–08	Austrian Bundesliga	17	3
Red Bull Salzburg	Total		45	9
FC Basel	2007–08	Super League	6	0
FC Ingolstadt	2008–09	2. Bundesliga	23	6
Career total			440	143

=== International ===
Appearances and goals by national team and year
National team	Year	Apps	Goals
Czech Republic	1995	2	0
Czech Republic	1997	4	0
Czech Republic	1998	10	1
Czech Republic	1999	8	1
Czech Republic	2000	10	0
Czech Republic	2001	11	3
Czech Republic	2002	5	1
Czech Republic	2003	5	2
Czech Republic	2004	9	1
Czech Republic	2005	5	4
Czech Republic	2006	5	1
Total		74	14

Scores and results list the Czech Republic's goal tally first, score column indicates score after each Lokvenc goal.

List of international goals scored by Vratislav Lokvenc
No.	Date	Venue	Opponent	Score	Result	Competition	Ref.
1	27 May 1998	Seoul Olympic Stadium, Seoul, South Korea	South Korea	2–0	2–2	Friendly	
2	28 April 1999	Polish Army Stadium, Warsaw, Poland	Poland	1–2	1–2	Friendly	
3	15 August 2001	Sportovní areál Drnovice, Drnovice, Czech Republic	South Korea	3–0	5–0	Friendly	
4	5 September 2001	Na Stínadlech, Teplice, Czech Republic	Malta	2–1	3–2	2002 FIFA World Cup qualification	
5	6 October 2001	Letná Stadium, Prague, Czech Republic	Bulgaria	4–0	6–0	2002 FIFA World Cup qualification	
6	13 February 2002	GSP Stadium, Strovolos, Cyprus	Cyprus	1–1	4–3	Friendly	
7	11 June 2003	Andrův stadion, Olomouc, Czech Republic	Moldova	4–0	5–0	UEFA Euro 2004 qualifying	
8	11 June 2003	Andrův stadion, Olomouc, Czech Republic	Moldova	5–0	5–0	UEFA Euro 2004 qualifying	
9	17 November 2004	City Park, Skopje, Macedonia	Macedonia	1–0	2–0	2006 FIFA World Cup qualification	
10	26 March 2005	Na Stínadlech, Teplice, Czech Republic	Finland	4–3	4–3	2006 FIFA World Cup qualification	
11	30 March 2005	Estadi Comunal d'Andorra la Vella, Andorra la Vella, Andorra	Andorra	3–0	4–0	2006 FIFA World Cup qualification	
12	4 June 2005	Stadion u Nisy, Liberec, Czech Republic	Moldova	1–0	8–1	2006 FIFA World Cup qualification	
13	4 June 2005	Stadion u Nisy, Liberec, Czech Republic	Moldova	8–1	8–1	2006 FIFA World Cup qualification	
14	30 May 2006	Stadion Střelnice, Jablonec nad Nisou, Czech Republic	Costa Rica	1–0	1–0	Friendly	

== Honours ==
Sparta Prague

- Czech First League: 1994–95, 1996–97, 1997–98, 1998–99, 1999–2000.
- Czech Cup: 1996

1. FC Kaiserslautern

- DFB-Pokal runner-up: 2002–03

Red Bull Salzburg

- Austrian Football Bundesliga: 2006–07; runner-up: 2005–06

FC Basel

- Swiss Super League: 2007–08
- Swiss Cup: 2007–08

Czech Republic

- FIFA Confederations Cup third place: 1997

Individual

- Czech First League top scorer: 1999–2000
