= Michal Beneš =

Czech football referee

- Born: 26 November 1967 (age 58)

Domestic
Years	League	Role

International
Years	League	Role
1999–2004	FIFA listed	Referee

Michal Beneš (born 26 November 1967) is a former Czech professional football referee. He was a full international for FIFA since 1999. He was appointed on 2001 FIFA U-17 World Championship and refereed some UEFA Champions League matches.
