= Petr Gabriel =

Czech footballer (born 1973)

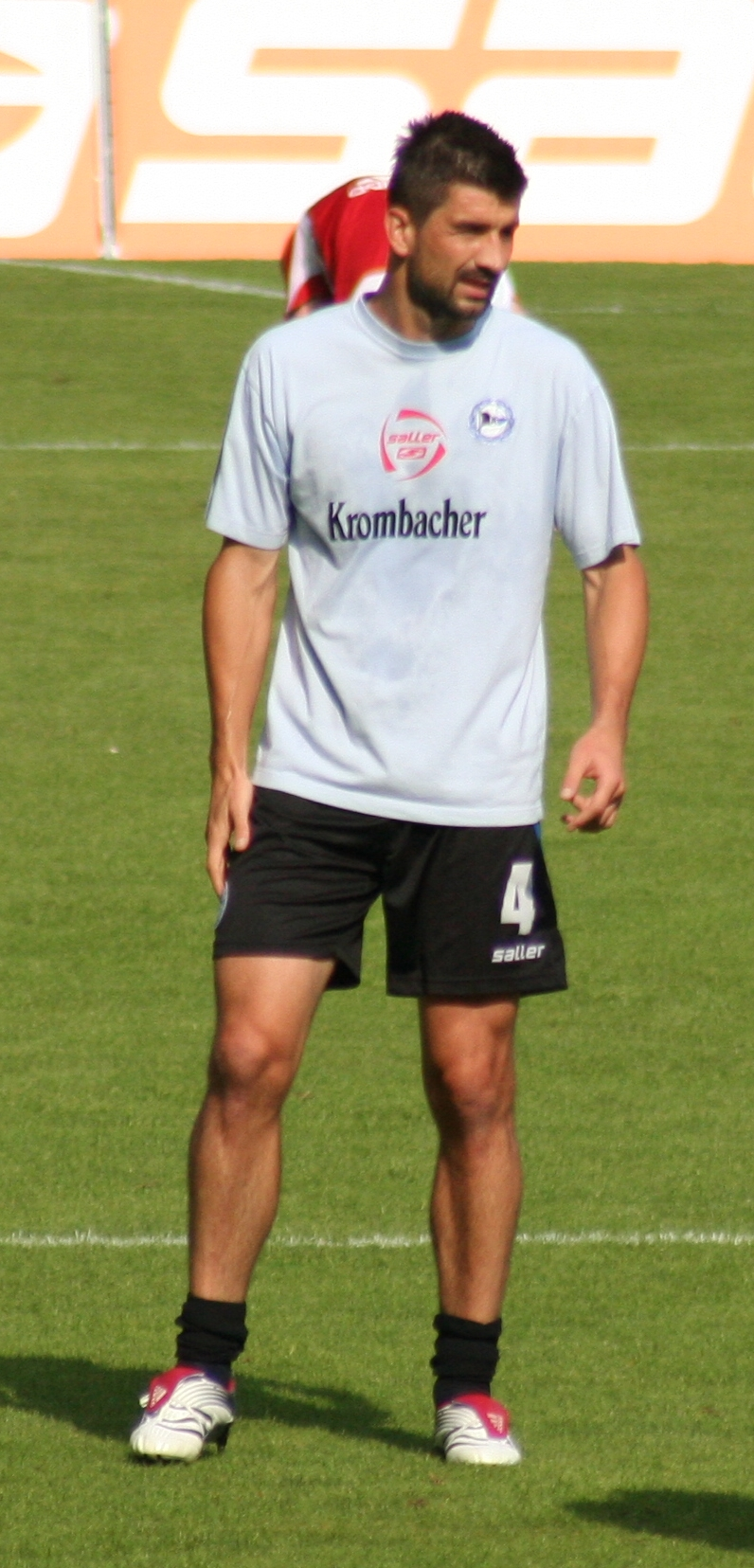
- Gabriel with Arminia Bielefeld

Personal information
- Date of birth: 17 May 1973 (age 53)
- Place of birth: Prague, Czechoslovakia
- Height: 1.91 m (6 ft 3 in)
- Position: Defender

Youth career
- 1981–1985: TJ Praha
- 1985–1991: Sparta Prague

Senior career*
| Years | Team | Apps | (Gls) |
| 1991–1992 | SKP Sušice | | |
| 1992–1993 | Union Cheb | 8 | (0) |
| 1993–1996 | Viktoria Žižkov | 79 | (3) |
| 1996–2000 | Sparta Prague | 94 | (6) |
| 2000–2003 | 1. FC Kaiserslautern | 7 | (0) |
| 2002–2003 | → Teplice (loan) | 10 | (0) |
| 2003–2008 | Arminia Bielefeld | 102 | (3) |
| 2008–2009 | Viktoria Žižkov | 27 | (0) |

International career
| 1994–1996 | Czech Republic U-21 | 12 | (0) |
| 1995–2000 | Czech Republic | 10 | (1) |
- * Club domestic league appearances and goals

Petr Gabriel (born 17 May 1973) is a Czech former professional footballer who played as a defender. He played for the Czech Republic national team, participating at the Euro 2000. At club level Gabriel played more than 200 matches in the Gambrinus liga.

== International career ==
Gabriel represented the Czech Republic national team at the Euro 2000. In the decisive group stage match against France, an attempted backpass from Gabriel to his goalkeeper was picked up by Thierry Henry, who scored. The Czech Republic lost 2–1 and ended its participation in the tournament after the group stage despite a 2–0 victory in its last match against Denmark.

== Personal life ==
Gabriel was born in Prague. He has two sons, Šimon and Adam, who are professional footballers.

== International goal ==
Scores and results list Czech Republic's goal tally first.

| # | Date | Venue | Opponent | Score | Result | Competition |
|---|---|---|---|---|---|---|
| 1. | 13 December 1995 | Al Kuwait Sports Club Stadium, Kaifan, Kuwait City, Kuwait | Kuwait | 1–0 | 2–1 | Exhibition game |
