= Stanislav Krejčík =

Czech footballer (born 1972)

Personal information
- Date of birth: 2 September 1972 (age 54)
- Position: Midfielder

Senior career*
Years	Team	Apps	(Gls)
1992–1993	Dukla Praha		
1997–1998	Atlantic Lázně Bohdaneč		
1997	Chrudim 1887		
1999–2000	Chmel Blšany		
2000	MUS Most 1996		
2001	Pardubice		
2002	Milín		
2002–2003	SKU Amstetten		

Managerial career
- 2013–2014: Czech Republic women
- * Club domestic league appearances and goals

Stanislav Krejčík (born 2 September 1972) is a Czech former professional footballer who played as a midfielder.
