= Jaromír Blažek =

Czech footballer (born 1972)

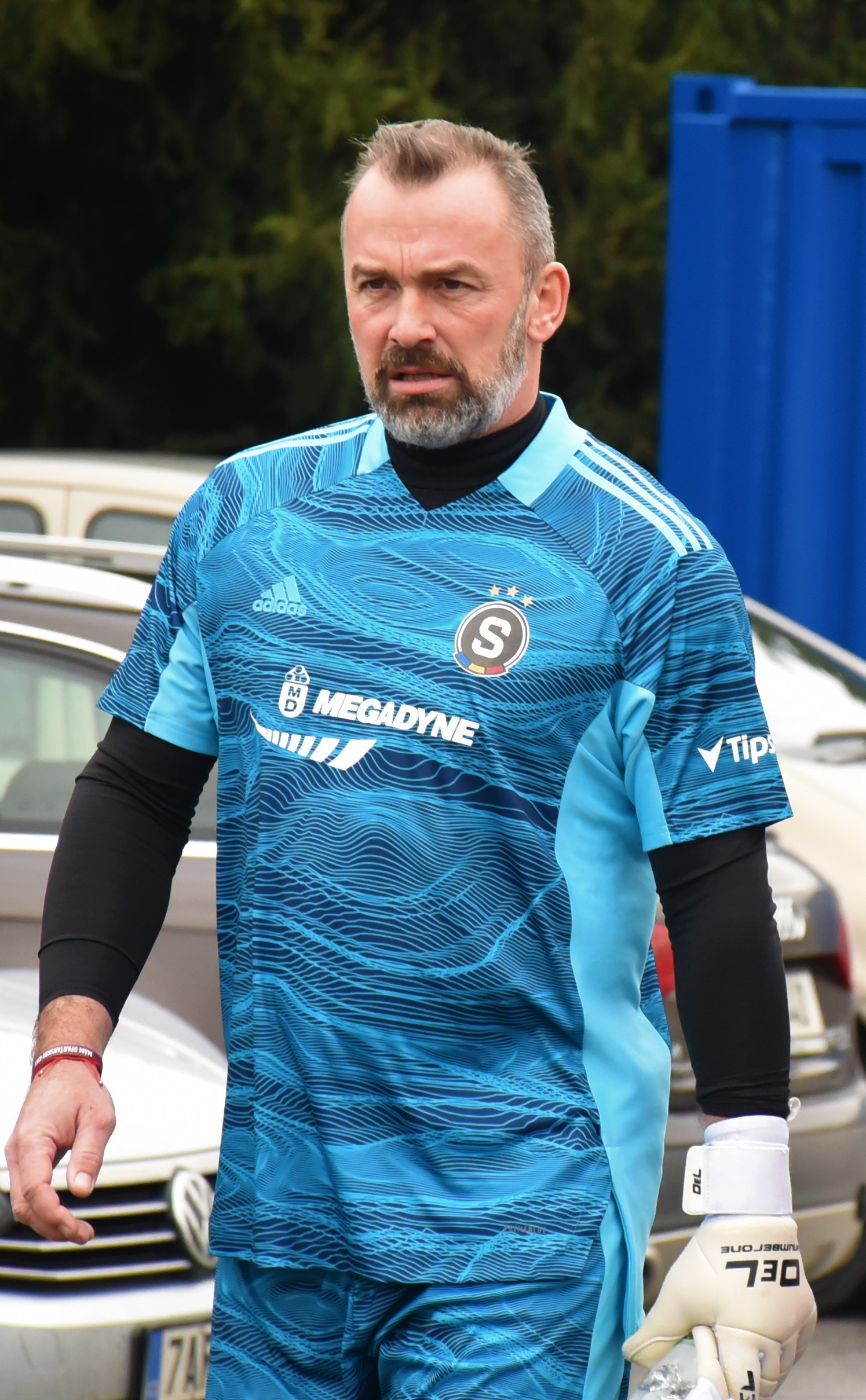

Personal information
- Full name: Jaromír Blažek
- Date of birth: 29 December 1972 (age 53)
- Place of birth: Brno, Czechoslovakia
- Height: 1.88 m (6 ft 2 in)
- Position: Goalkeeper

Youth career
- 1980–1982: Metra Blansko
- 1982–1990: Slavia Prague

Senior career*
Years	Team	Apps	(Gls)
1990–1992	Slavia Prague	9	(0)
1992–1993	Dynamo České Budějovice	29	(0)
1993–1994	Viktoria Žižkov	24	(0)
1994–2000	Bohemians Prague	117	(0)
1995–1996	→ Slavia Prague (loan)	7	(0)
2000–2007	Sparta Prague	167	(0)
2001–2002	→ Marila Příbram (loan)	22	(0)
2007–2008	1. FC Nürnberg	25	(0)
2008–2012	Sparta Prague	74	(0)
2012–2015	Vysočina Jihlava	59	(0)
Total		533	(0)

International career
1993	Czech Republic U-21	3	(0)
2000–2008	Czech Republic	14	(0)
Medal record
Men's football
Representing Czech Republic
UEFA European Championship
Bronze medal – third place	2004 Portugal
- * Club domestic league appearances and goals

Jaromír Blažek (Czech pronunciation: [ˈjaromiːr ˈblaʒɛk]; born 29 December 1972) is a Czech former professional football goalkeeper. Apart from one season in Germany, he has spent his entire professional career in the Czech Republic. Blažek has also been called up as a reserve goalkeeper to the Czech Republic national football team at three UEFA European Championships and the 2006 FIFA World Cup.

== Club career ==
Born in Brno, Blažek started his career in Slavia Prague, where he got to play his first league games. After two years during which he was mainly used as a substitute, he moved to Dynamo České Budějovice to become the number one goalkeeper there. That 1992–93 season was to be the last of the Czechoslovak First League, and he decided to spend his first season in the new Gambrinus liga with Viktoria Žižkov, which turned out to be a good choice since he won his first title, the national cup. He left after only one year though, moving across Prague to FC Bohemians. They were relegated that year and Blažek, who did not want to spend a year in the Second League, was loaned for one year to his first club Slavia Prague, where he won the 1995–96 Czech First League. Since Bohemians regained promotion the same year, he returned there and stayed for three and a half years.

However, while his club was not performing very well, Blažek drew the attention of giants Sparta Prague, transferring there in early 2000 and winning back-to-back titles in 2000 and 2001. He went on loan to rivals Marila Příbram in 2001 but returned after one year. After that, he played almost every single game for Sparta Prague, be it league, cup or Champions League games. It was a very successful period for Blažek as he won four more titles and three national cups.

In 2007, he decided to move abroad and was sold to German club 1. FC Nürnberg, who purchased him as a replacement for Raphael Schäfer who had left for VfB Stuttgart over the summer. Blažek was the number one there but fell sick in April and could not play the end of a season that saw Nürnberg being relegated. In June, it was announced that Blažek was returning to Sparta Prague for the following season. However, on 16 December 2011, Sparta Prague announced their decision to terminate Blažek's contract early, releasing him as a free agent. This was confirmed by the player's agent Pavel Paska.

On 22 February 2014, in a league match for Jihlava against Znojmo, Blažek kept his 139th clean sheet, setting a new goalkeeper record for the Czech league.

== International career ==
Blažek made his debut for the national team on 29 March 2000 in a friendly match against Australia that ended up in a 3–1 win. Due to the dominance of Petr Čech as the first-choice national team goalkeeper, Blažek was unable to make regular appearances for his nation. He was part of the Czech squad at Euro 2000, Euro 2004, and the 2006 World Cup, but the only tournament he played at was Euro 2004.

== Personal life ==
He is married and has two children – Jakub and Aneta. Blažek is the cousin of tennis player Radek Štěpánek.

== Career statistics ==
=== International ===
Czech Republic national team
Year	Apps	Goals
2000	2	0
2003	1	0
2004	2	0
2005	2	0
2006	2	0
2007	1	0
2008	1	0
Total	11	0

== Honours ==
=== Club ===
Viktoria Žižkov

- Czech Cup: 1994

Slavia Prague

- Czech First League: 1995–96

Bohemians 1905

- Czech Second League: 3rd Place 1997–98
- Czech Second League: 1998–99

Sparta Prague

- Czech First League: 1999–2000, 2000–01, 2002–03, 2004–05, 2006–07
- Czech First League: Runner-up 2003–04, 2008–09, 2010–11
- Czech Cup: 2004, 2006, 2007
- Czech Cup: Runner-up 2001

Vysočina Jihlava

- Czech Second League: Runner-up 2011–12

=== International ===
Czech Republic

- UEFA European Championship: Semi-finalist 2004

=== Individual ===
Czech First League

- Team of the Year 1999–2000, 2002–03, 2003–04, 2008–09
- Most clean sheets 2002–03, 2006–07, 2009–10, 2010–11
- Best goalkeeper 2012–13
- Second best goalkeeper between the years 1993–2013 by the fans' poll
- Player of the Month: October 2013

Czech Footballer of the Year

- Personality of the League 2005–06

== Records ==
- Czech First League: Oldest player in history of the Czech First League (42 years, 4 months)
- Czech First League: Most clean sheets in history of the Czech First League (157)
- Czech First League: Most played seasons (19)
