= Jaromír Navrátil =

Czech footballer

Personal information
- Date of birth: 20 February 1963 (age 63)
- Place of birth: Czechoslovakia
- Position: Midfielder

Senior career*
Years	Team	Apps	(Gls)
1989–1991	Brno		
1991–1992	Slavia Prague		
1991–1992	Bohemians Prague		
1993–1994	Union Cheb		
1994–1999	FK Jablonec		
1999–2000	Viktoria Žižkov		
Total		194	(25)

International career
1995–1996	Czech Republic	2	(0)
- * Club domestic league appearances and goals

Jaromír Navrátil (born 20 February 1963) is a Czech former football player. He made two international appearances for the Czech Republic. He made a total of 194 top flight appearances spanning the end of the Czechoslovak First League and the beginning of the Gambrinus liga, scoring 25 goals.
