= Stanislav Marek =

Czech footballer (born 1970)

Personal information
- Date of birth: 1 February 1970 (age 56)
- Place of birth: Czechoslovakia
- Position: Defender

Youth career
- 1977–1989: FC Slavoj Žirovnice

Senior career*
| Years | Team | Apps | (Gls) |
| 1989–1990 | SKP České Budějovice | | |
| 1990–1991 | VTJ Písek | | |
| 1991–1997 | České Budějovice | 98 | (1) |
| 1992 | → Jablonec (loan) | | |
| 1993 | → Slovan Liberec (loan) | 13 | (0) |
| 1997–2000 | Slovan Liberec | 69 | (1) |
| 2000–2003 | České Budějovice | 29 | (0) |
- * Club domestic league appearances and goals

Stanislav Marek (born 1 February 1970) is a Czech former footballer who played as a defender.

== Life ==
Marek was born on 1 February 1970 in Czechoslovakia. He started playing football in Žirovnice.

After retiring from professional football, Marek worked as an administrator. He was the cousin of Czech hockey player Jan Marek.

== Career ==
Marek started his senior career in SKP České Budějovice and VTJ Písek, where he played during his military service. In 1991, he signed for SK Dynamo České Budějovice. In 1992, he signed for FC Slovan Liberec. After that, he signed for FK Jablonec. In 1994, he returned to Dynamo České Budějovice. In 1997, he returned to Slovan Liberec. In 2000, he returned to Dynamo České Budějovice for a second time. In 2003, he ended his professional career and continues playing for Austrian side SV Freistadt in lower amateur tiers.

Marek mainly operated as a defender. He was known for his speed. During his career, he received 9 red cards in the Czech First League, which, together with three other players, is the most in the history of the league.
