= Radek Divecký =

Czech footballer

Personal information
- Date of birth: 21 March 1974 (age 52)
- Place of birth: Teplice, Czechoslovakia
- Height: 1.86 m (6 ft 1 in)
- Position: Forward

Senior career*
| Years | Team | Apps | (Gls) |
| 1995–2000 | Teplice | 128 | (31) |
| 2000 | Jeonnam Dragons | 9 | (2) |
| 2001 | FC Slovan Liberec | 10 | (1) |
| 2001–2004 | Teplice | 69 | (16) |
| 2004 | → Mladá Boleslav (loan) | 14 | (7) |
| 2005 | Pogoń Szczecin | 22 | (3) |
| 2006 | 1. FK Příbram | 12 | (3) |
| 2006–2007 | Bohemians 1905 | 6 | (0) |
| 2007 | Jagiellonia Białystok | 8 | (0) |
| 2007–2008 | SK Sokol Brozany nad Ohří | | |
- * Club domestic league appearances and goals

Radek Divecký (born 21 March 1974) is a Czech former professional footballer who played as a forward. He played in the Gambrinus liga for ten seasons, eight of those for Teplice, making nearly 200 league appearances and scoring over 40 goals.
