= Luděk Stracený =

Czech footballer

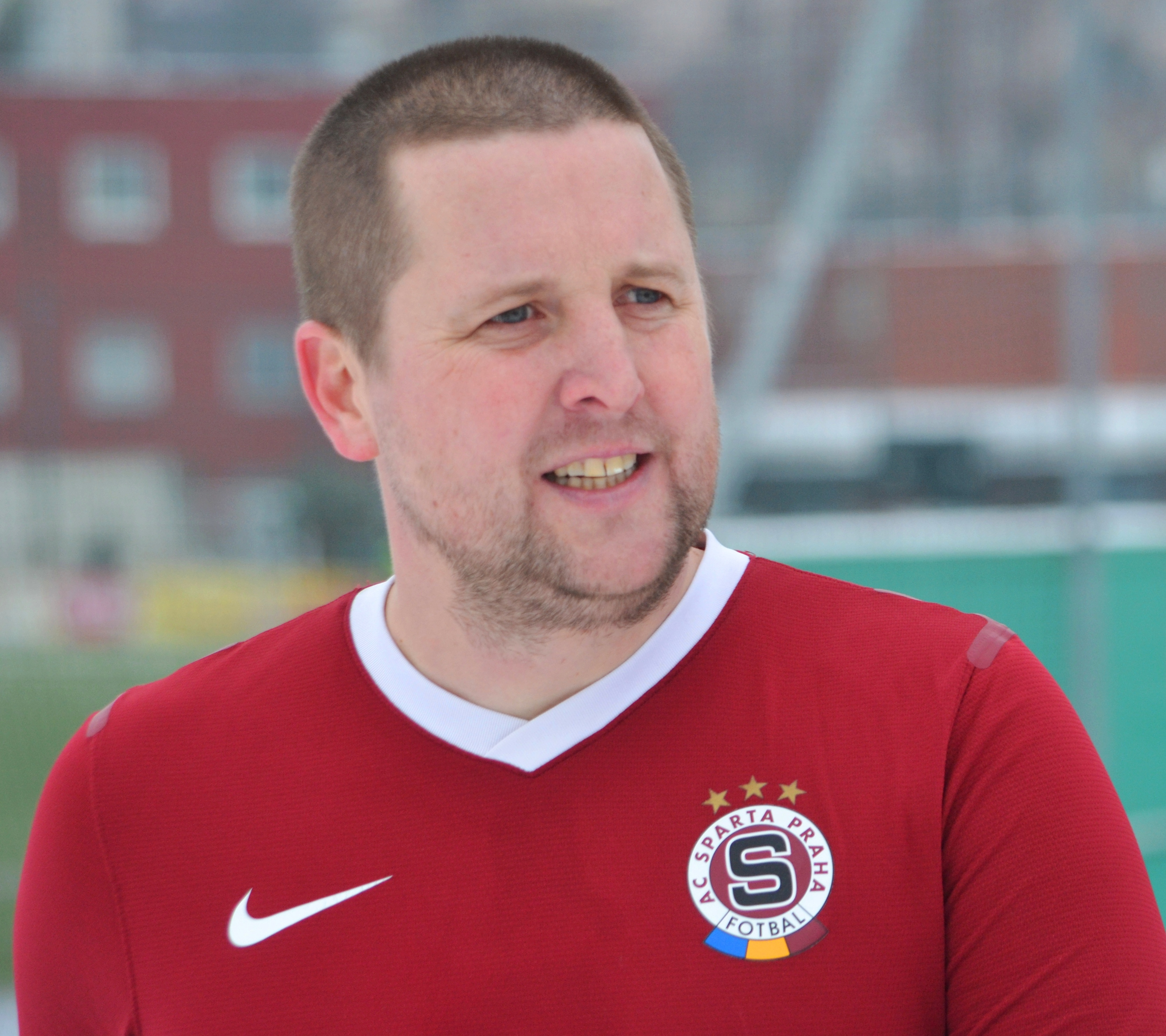
- Stracený in 2014

Personal information
- Date of birth: 19 April 1977 (age 49)
- Place of birth: Prague, Czechoslovakia
- Height: 1.78 m (5 ft 10 in)
- Position: Striker

Youth career
- 1983–1984: Sokol Říčany
- 1984–1995: Sparta Prague

Senior career*
Years	Team	Apps	(Gls)
1995–2000	Sparta Prague	26	(2)
1996–1997	→ SK Chrudim (loan)	26	(2)
1998	→ SK Chrudim (loan)	13	(5)
1999–2000	→ FK Viktoria Žižkov (loan)	21	(3)
2000–2005	FK Viktoria Žižkov	101	(14)
2005	→ Marila Příbram (loan)	16	(2)
2006	FBK Kaunas	0	(0)
2006	→ Heart of Midlothian (loan)	2	(0)
2006–2009	FK Viktoria Žižkov	58	(7)

International career
1997	Czech Republic U20	5	(0)
1998	Czech Republic U21	1	(0)
1998	Czech Republic B	1	(0)
2001	Czech Republic	1	(0)
- * Club domestic league appearances and goals

Luděk Stracený (born 19 April 1977, in Prague) is a Czech former professional football player. He signed for FBK Kaunas in February 2006 and immediately joined Scottish side Heart of Midlothian on loan. He returned to the Czech Republic, signing for FK Viktoria Žižkov in October 2006, when he scored on his debut against Jakubčovice.
