= Tomáš Poštulka =

Czech footballer (born 1974)

Personal information
- Date of birth: 2 February 1974 (age 52)
- Place of birth: Prague, Czechoslovakia
- Height: 1.90 m (6 ft 3 in)
- Position: Goalkeeper

Youth career
- 1980–1991: Sparta Prague

Senior career*
Years	Team	Apps	(Gls)
1991–1992	Carmelita	2	(0)
1992–1993	Dukla Prague	2	(0)
1993	Petra Drnovice	14	(0)
1994–1997	SK Hradec Králové	50	(0)
1997–2001	Sparta Prague	72	(0)
2001–2007	FK Teplice	149	(0)
2007–2008	Sparta Prague	12	(0)
2008–2009	Viktoria Plzeň	10	(0)
2010	Zenit Čáslav		

International career
1994–1996	Czech Republic U21	7	(0)
1998	Czech Republic	7	(0)
- * Club domestic league appearances and goals

Tomáš Poštulka (born 2 February 1974) is a Czech former professional footballer who played as a goalkeeper. He is one of the most successful Czech goalkeepers – and together with Petr Čech and Jaromír Blažek the most seasoned Czech goalkeeper in European Cups (Champions League and UEFA Cup). Under Jozef Chovanec he was the #1 goalkeeper in the Czech National Team. Besides Czech Republic, he has played in Costa Rica.

== Club career ==
Poštulka was born in Prague. He began his career in 1982 coming to Sparta Prague and playing in all kind junior Czech national teams (U-18, U-21,...). In 1991, he spent one year in Costa Rica playing 2 league games for Carmelita(1st Costa Rican league). After his comeback he spent some time in Dukla Prague and FK Drnovice (both 1st Czech league). In 1995, he moved to Hradec Kralove where he achieved his first bigger success winning the Czech Cup. From these times came his nickname the "penalties wizard" because of his stats – having saved every second penalty.

=== Sparta Prague ===
In January 1997 Poštulka returned to Sparta Prague, with the club subsequently winning the Czech First League 5 times in a row. Sparta played the UEFA Champions League many times and the UEFA Cup at the time and "Tomas" got his first invitation to the Czech National Team. He played 7 matches of qualification (all wins) for the EURO 2000 tournament and won the Japan Kirin Cup with the prize for best goalkeeper.

=== FK Teplice ===
In 2001 the ambitious team FK Teplice offered Sparta a big transfer price and Postulka moved to North Bohemia. There he celebrated the win of the Czech Cup and underdog victories in the UEFA Cup. In 2005, he set up two season records by going up to 600 minutes without conceding a goal (it was a club record and 10th best time in league history) and the second record was the accomplishment of having 15 clean sheets.

=== AC Sparta Prague ===
On 16 February 2007, he was transferred back to his mother club, AC Sparta Prague.
