= 2000–01 Czech First League =

8th season of top-tier football league in Czech Republic

Czech First League
- Season: 2000–01
- Champions: Sparta Prague
- Relegated: České Budějovice; Viktoria Plzeň
- Champions League: Sparta Prague; Slavia Prague
- UEFA Cup: Sigma Olomouc; Marila Příbram; Viktoria Žižkov; Slovan Liberec
- Intertoto Cup: Blšany; Synot
- Matches: 240
- Goals: 613 (2.55 per match)
- Top goalscorer: Vítězslav Tuma (15)
- Biggest home win: Synot 5–0 Plzeň
- Biggest away win: Ostrava 1–5 Sparta Prague; Olomouc 1–5 Slavia Prague
- Highest scoring: Sparta Prague 4–4 Slavia Prague
- Highest attendance: 16,350; Sparta Prague 4–4 Slavia Prague
- Lowest attendance: 457; Žižkov 3–3 Plzeň
- Average attendance: 4,549

The 2000–01 Czech First League, known as the Gambrinus liga for sponsorship reasons, was the eighth season of top-tier football in the Czech Republic.

== Stadia and locations ==
Location of clubs in the 2000–01 Czech First League

== League table ==
Pos	Team	Pld	W	D	L	GF	GA	GD	Pts	Qualification or relegation
1	Sparta Prague (C)	30	21	5	4	71	31	+40	68	Qualification for Champions League group stage
2	Slavia Prague	30	14	10	6	46	32	+14	52	Qualification for Champions League third qualifying round
3	Sigma Olomouc	30	14	10	6	47	33	+14	52	Qualification for UEFA Cup first round
4	Marila Příbram	30	14	9	7	40	26	+14	51	Qualification for UEFA Cup first round
5	Viktoria Žižkov	30	12	10	8	45	40	+5	46	Qualification for UEFA Cup first round
6	Slovan Liberec	30	12	9	9	39	31	+8	45	Qualification for UEFA Cup first round
7	Drnovice	30	11	8	11	35	36	−1	41	
8	Teplice	30	12	4	14	45	39	+6	40	
9	Bohemians Prague	30	10	10	10	33	34	−1	40	
10	Blšany	30	10	10	10	35	35	0	40	Qualification for Intertoto Cup third round
11	Synot	30	9	10	11	37	35	+2	37	Qualification for Intertoto Cup second round
12	Jablonec	30	8	8	14	26	40	−14	32	
13	Brno	30	7	9	14	24	35	−11	30	
14	Baník Ostrava	30	7	9	14	28	45	−17	30	
15	České Budějovice (R)	30	6	8	16	32	56	−24	26	Relegation to Czech 2. Liga
16	Viktoria Plzeň (R)	30	4	9	17	30	65	−35	21	Relegation to Czech 2. Liga

Source: Fortuna liga
Rules for classification: 1) points; 2) head-to-head points; 3) head-to-head goal difference; 4) head-to-head goals scored; 5) goal difference; 6) number of goals scored.
(C) Champions; (R) Relegated

== Results ==
Home \ Away	OST	BLŠ	BOH	BRN	ČBU	DRN	JAB	PŘÍ	OLO	SLA	LIB	SPA	SSM	TEP	PLZ	VŽI
Baník Ostrava		1–1	1–1	2–1	2–0	2–0	1–1	0–1	1–1	1–3	0–1	1–5	0–0	2–0	3–0	2–2
Blšany	3–0		0–0	0–1	3–1	0–0	4–0	1–1	0–0	2–1	1–0	2–2	2–2	3–1	2–1	0–1
Bohemians Prague	2–0	4–0		2–0	4–3	0–3	1–1	1–0	2–2	1–1	0–0	4–2	1–1	2–1	3–1	1–0
Brno	1–0	0–0	0–0		3–0	0–0	1–0	0–0	0–2	0–2	3–1	1–2	0–2	2–0	1–0	1–2
České Budějovice	1–0	1–1	0–1	2–1		0–1	2–1	0–0	3–1	3–2	0–0	1–4	1–1	2–2	4–3	2–2
Drnovice	3–0	1–3	2–1	2–2	2–0		2–1	0–1	1–2	1–2	2–1	1–1	0–2	3–1	3–1	2–2
Jablonec	2–1	0–2	1–0	2–1	1–1	0–0		2–1	2–1	1–2	1–3	0–3	1–0	1–0	2–0	0–0
Marila Příbram	1–3	3–0	3–0	3–0	1–0	1–1	1–0		0–0	2–1	1–1	1–1	4–1	0–1	3–1	2–1
Sigma Olomouc	0–0	3–0	1–0	3–0	2–1	2–0	1–0	3–2		1–5	1–1	0–1	3–2	3–1	4–0	4–1
Slavia Prague	0–0	2–3	1–0	2–1	1–0	0–0	0–0	0–0	2–2		1–0	1–3	0–0	3–0	2–1	1–0
Slovan Liberec	3–0	2–0	3–0	0–0	2–0	2–0	3–1	1–3	2–0	1–1		1–1	2–1	0–3	2–0	4–2
Sparta Prague	4–1	1–0	1–0	1–0	5–1	3–0	2–0	3–0	0–1	4–4	4–1		2–0	2–1	5–1	1–0
Synot	2–1	1–0	0–0	2–1	2–0	1–2	1–1	0–1	3–1	1–1	2–2	2–1		0–1	5–0	1–1
Teplice	4–0	3–1	3–0	1–1	4–1	0–1	2–1	1–2	0–0	2–0	0–0	2–3	2–1		5–1	1–2
Viktoria Plzeň	1–1	1–1	1–1	1–1	2–2	2–1	2–1	1–1	1–1	1–3	1–0	2–3	1–0	0–2		0–0
Viktoria Žižkov	1–2	1–0	2–1	1–1	2–0	3–1	2–2	2–1	2–2	1–2	2–0	2–1	3–1	2–1	3–3	

Source: Fortuna liga
Legend: Blue = home team win; Yellow = draw; Red = away team win.

== Top goalscorers ==
Rank	Player	Club	Goals
1	(Czech Republic) Vítězslav Tuma	Drnovice	15
2	(Czech Republic) Pavel Hapal	Sigma Olomouc	14
2	(Czech Republic) Pavel Kuka	Slavia Prague	14
4	(Czech Republic) Radim Holub	Sparta Prague	12
4	(Czech Republic) Jiří Kowalík	Synot	12
6	(Czech Republic) Josef Obajdin	Sparta Prague	11
7	(Argentina) Leandro Lázzaro	Sparta Prague	10
7	(Czech Republic) Michal Kolomazník	Teplice	10
7	(Zimbabwe) Kennedy Chihuri	Viktoria Žižkov	10

== Attendances ==
#	Club	Average
1	Sigma Olomouc	7,718
2	Brno	7,267
3	Teplice	6,564
4	Sparta Praha	6,290
5	Příbram	5,672
6	Česke Budějovice	4,196
7	Jablonec	3,973
8	Baník Ostrava	3,878
9	Drnovice	3,859
10	Synot	3,849
11	Slovan Liberec	3,841
12	Viktoria Žižkov	3,747
13	Slavia Praha	3,380
14	Viktoria Plzeň	3,074
15	Bohemians	2,993
16	Blšany	2,503

== See also ==
- 2000–01 Czech Cup
- 2000–01 Czech 2. Liga
