= Miloslav Penner =

Czech footballer (1972–2020)

Personal information
- Date of birth: 9 May 1972
- Place of birth: Uherské Hradiště, Czechoslovakia
- Date of death: 31 January 2020 (aged 47)
- Height: 1.80 m (5 ft 11 in)
- Position: Defender

Senior career*
| Years | Team | Apps | (Gls) |
| 1995–1996 | Uherské Hradiště | 40 | (3) |
| 1996–1997 | FC Karviná | 14 | (0) |
| 1997–2004 | SK České Budějovice | 177 | (2) |
| 2004–2005 | FK Tatran Prachatice | 9 | (0) |
| 2005–2007 | 1. FK Příbram | 50 | (1) |
| 2007–2008 | FC Zlín | 38 | (0) |
- * Club domestic league appearances and goals

Miloslav Penner (9 May 1972 – 31 January 2020) was a Czech football defender. He made over 200 appearances in the Czech First League. Penner was known for his unusual hairstyles.

== Personal life ==
His father, also named Miloslav Penner, died at the age of 43 in 1992 when the younger Penner was only 19. His son, Nicolas Penner, is a footballer for Juventus Turin.

== Death ==
Miloslav Penner died suddenly on 31 January 2020.
