= Martin Ticháček =

Czech footballer and coach

Personal information
- Full name: Martin Ticháček
- Date of birth: 15 September 1981 (age 45)
- Place of birth: Klatovy, Czechoslovakia
- Height: 1.84 m (6 ft 0 in)
- Position: Goalkeeper

Youth career
- 1992–1994: Jiska Domažlice
- 1994–1999: FC Viktoria Plzeň

Senior career*
Years	Team	Apps	(Gls)
1999–2013	FC Viktoria Plzeň	88	(0)
2007	1. FC Karlovy Vary (loan)		
2012	FK Viktoria Žižkov (loan)	5	(0)
2014–2015	TJ Jiskra Domažlice		

Managerial career
- 2015–2016: FC Viktoria Plzeň (GK coach)
- 2016: FC Anzhi Makhachkala (GK coach)
- 2020–: PFC Ludogorets Razgrad (GK coach)
- * Club domestic league appearances and goals

Martin Ticháček (born 15 September 1981) is a Czech football coach and a former player. His position was goalkeeper.
