= AC Sparta Prague =

Czech association football club

Sparta Prague
- Full name: Athletic Club Sparta Praha Fotbal a.s.
- Nicknames: Železná Sparta (Iron Sparta); Rudí (The Reds/The Maroons) (Note: Sparta Prague rivals, Slavia Prague, refer to themselves as "Červenobílí" (English: The Red-Whites) but refer to Spartans as "Rudí" (English: The Dark Reds/The Maroons).); Letenští
- Founded: 16 November 1893; 133 years ago
- Ground: epet ARENA
- Capacity: 18,349
- Owner(s): J&T Credit Investments (60%); Daniel Křetínský (40%)
- President: Daniel Křetínský
- Head coach: Brian Priske
- League: Czech First League
- 2025–26: 2nd of 16
- Website: sparta.cz
Home colours	Away colours

Athletic Club Sparta Praha (Czech pronunciation: [ˈaː ˈtsɛː ˈsparta ˈpraɦa]), commonly known as Sparta Prague and Sparta Praha, is a professional football club based in Prague.

The most successful club in the Czech Republic and one of the most successful in central Europe, Sparta Prague has won the central European Cup (also known as the Mitropa Cup) three times and as well as reached the semi-finals of the European Cup (now the UEFA Champions League) in 1992 and the UEFA Cup Winners' Cup in 1973.

Sparta have won a record 38 domestic league titles, a record 16 Czech Cups (and its predecessor Czechoslovak Cup), and two Czech Supercups. Sparta was long the main source for the Czech Republic national football team; however, lately the best Czech players almost exclusively play in foreign leagues.

Sparta plays at Prague's Epet Arena, also known as Letná Stadium.

== History ==
Club logo until 2021

=== Early years ===
At the close of 1893, a small group of young people based around three brothers – Václav, Bohumil and Rudolf Rudl – had the idea of setting up a sports club. On 16 November, the founders' meeting approved the club's articles of association and one month later, on 17 December, the first annual general meeting took place. Soon after that, the Athletic Club Sparta came up with its tricolour, in which blue symbolises Europe, red and yellow being the symbols of the (then) royal city of Prague.

At the very beginning of the club's football history, the players used to wear black jerseys with a big "S" on the front. They then played for two years in black-and-white striped jerseys, which they returned to, wearing them as a reserve strip, for two years in 1896. In 1906, club president Dr. Petřík was in England where he saw the famous Woolwich Arsenal play with their red jerseys and decided to bring one set to Prague. At that time, he did not realise he was setting up one of the club's greatest traditions. Together with the red jerseys, Sparta players wear white shorts and black socks.

Shortly after World War I, a team was put together that triggered off the famous period of the 1920s and '30s referred to as "Iron Sparta". A football league in Czechoslovakia was established in the mid-twenties and the club collected title after title. To this day, the fans still recall the names of the players of that period with admiration: Peyer, Hojer, Perner, Káďa, Kolenatý, Červený. A few years later, some no less famous names appeared, such as Hochmann, Burgr, Hajný, Šíma, Silný, Čtyřoký, Košťálek and in particular Oldřich Nejedlý, the top scorer at the 1934 FIFA World Cup. Shortly before this most famous era kicked off, Vlasta Burian, the man who later became the king of Czech comedians, played in goal for the club.

The milestones of the first golden period of the club's history are two Central European Cup titles, which in the '20 and the '30s enjoyed the same recognition as that of today's Champions League. Sparta's three titles are important milestones in the cup's history. After two triumphs in 1927 and 1935, the third came in 1964, at a time when the cup's importance was gradually falling behind that of other European cups.

In 1946, AC Sparta toured Great Britain opening with a 2–2 draw against Arsenal on 2 October.

=== Golden years ===
Golden periods alternated with years when Sparta fans only nostalgically remembered the "good old times". After substantial changes driven by the socialist regime, bringing frequent changes of the club's name rather than achievements to be proud of, the title in 1954 was the last one before a long period of misery. Only the great era of the team around Andrej Kvašňák in the 1960s brought back memories of the club's golden years.

There are still many people who recollect the era of Andrej Kvašňák, Jiří Tichý and Václav Mašek. Those were the days when Sparta hosted the biggest number of fans in its history, with the stadium at that time accommodating almost 40,000. All three of the above-mentioned heroes were part of the national team that finished second at the 1962 World Cup in Chile. Other important players in these "golden years" were Josef Vojta, Vladimír Táborský and Ivan Mráz.

=== Relegation and comeback ===
Up until 1975, Sparta was the only Czech club that had never been relegated to the second division. In this year, however, due to a number of circumstances, the team dropped to division two. The club only spent one year in this division, with the crucial matches for the club's comeback to the elite being sold out.

Nevertheless, the club did not win another league title until the early 1980s. Built around Chovanec, Berger, Hašek, Skuhravý and Griga, the team regained its former status and won five league titles in a row between 1986 and 1991. In 1983–84, the team got as far as the UEFA Cup quarter-finals, falling to Hajduk Split. In the early 1990s, this successful era was continued by the next generation of players, such as Siegl, Horňák, Němeček, Frýdek, Němec and Kouba.

=== 1990s to present ===
Sparta has achieved a number of international successes, including two Central European Cup titles in the period of "Iron Sparta". More recent high points include Sparta's performance in the last year of the European Champion Clubs' Cup before rebranding as the UEFA Champions League, in 1991–92. Sparta defeated Rangers, then Marseille and reached the semi-final group. Playing Barcelona, Dynamo Kyiv and Benfica, Sparta finished second. Unlike today's system, only the group winner reached the final. Being second in the group, Sparta was unofficially Europe's third or fourth best team.

Sparta participated in the group stage of Champions League 7 times between 1997 and 2006. The club enjoyed their best Champions League performances in the 1999–2000 and 2001–02 seasons, reaching the now-defunct second group stage on both occasions. In 1999–2000, it won its initial group under the management of Ivan Hašek, and was then third in the quarter-final group. In that group, Sparta came up against a Barcelona squad which went on to reach the semi-finals.

In the 2001–02 season, Sparta was drawn against the eventual winners of both the European competitions during the course of its run. Feyenoord lost twice to Sparta in the champions league group stage and managed to qualify for the UEFA Cup, which it went on to win. Sparta went on to meet Real Madrid in the quarter-final that year. Sparta did not qualify for the group stage in 2002–03, when it was beaten by the Belgian club Genk in the third round of qualifying. 2003–04 saw Sparta take on two Italian giants; initially, the club beat Lazio in the group stage, but after an initial draw Sparta failed to get into the quarter-finals past Milan. The group stage in 2004–05 did not work out at all well for Sparta. After drawing with Manchester United at the sold-out Toyota Arena, the other matches were lost and the club finished last in the group with the club achieving their worst-ever return of just one point from the six matches.

Sparta, usually along with Slavia Prague, has always been a base for the national team; Sparta players contributed to the biggest achievements of the Czechoslovak and Czech national teams. It all started in 1934, when Oldřich Nejedlý was the top scorer at the World Cup in Rome; four years later, seven Sparta players were part of the national team at the World Cup in France. In 1962, Kvašňák and Tichý played for the "silver" team in Chile. In 1990 in Italy, where the national team got as far as the quarterfinal, the team's play was mainly created by Chovanec, Bílek, Hašek and other Sparta players, such as Skuhravý, who went on to become a star of the Italian league. Sparta players also contributed to the last big achievement of the already independent Czech Republic team in 1996. Kouba, Frýdek and Horňák returned to Letná from England with silver medals. On top of that, the team was coached by Dušan Uhrin, who had spent his best years at Sparta, and Pavel Novotný came to Sparta two years later. Sparta players also featured in more recent qualification and tournament games of the Czech national team. Miroslav Baranek, Tomáš Votava, Vratislav Lokvenc, Milan Fukal, Martin Hašek, Libor Sionko, Jiří Novotný, Jaromír Blažek and the outstanding talent of Tomáš Rosický helped the team in its UEFA Euro 2000 campaign in Belgium and the Netherlands.

The next era culminating in the bronze medal in the Euro 2004 in Portugal saw Sparta players leaving their unmistakable mark in the national team successes. Zdeněk Grygera, Tomáš Hübschman, Jaromír Blažek, Karel Poborský and academy products Petr Čech and Tomáš Rosický helped Czech football to become recognised as being amongst the elite in Europe and most have played for elite European clubs. Currently, Sparta is one of only two teams in the domestic league which supplies players to the national side. It goes without saying that the club also supplies players to the country's various youth teams.

=== Brian Priske era ===
Following the departure of coach Pavel Vrba, speculation about Sparta Prague's next head coach pointed to Adrián Guľa. However, on 31 May 2022, Sparta surprised the public by appointing Danish coach Brian Priske. Under Priske, several key players, including Adam Hložek and Dávid Hancko left the club.

Sparta had its worst start to a season in decades, being eliminated by Viking FK in the second qualifying round of the UEFA Conference League and losing their league opener to Liberec. A series of poor results followed, including five consecutive draws and a heavy 0–4 defeat to Slavia Prague. However, a tactical shift brought immediate results, starting with a 1–0 win over Viktoria Plzeň, Sparta's first in Plzeň since 2011. This turnaround led to further league victories and progression in the MOL Cup.

By the end of the autumn, Sparta trailed Viktoria Plzeň by seven points. After reinforcing the squad during the winter break, Sparta dominated the spring season, securing first place at the end of the regular season. In the championship group, Sparta overcame Slavia 3–2 in a crucial derby, with Ladislav Krejčí scoring the decisive penalty. A draw against Slovácko secured their 37th league title, the first in nine years.

Sparta's good form continued into the 2023–24 season, with strong domestic performances and a brief run in the UEFA Champions League qualifiers, where they were eliminated by FC Copenhagen after a 3–3 aggregate draw. Despite some setbacks in both domestic and European competitions, Sparta finished the year strongly, advancing to the knockout stages of the Europa League and securing key league victories. They were knocked out in the Round of 16 by Liverpool, 11–2 on aggregate.

=== End of Priske's tenure and leadership changes ===
Following the 2023–24 season, Brian Priske left to join Feyenoord and was replaced by Lars Friis. Sparta announced the signing of Kosovo international Ermal Krasniqi, while club captain Ladislav Krejčí departed for Girona. Filip Panák was named the new captain.

Sparta's preseason saw wins against AIK Stockholm and Spartak Trnava, but also a heavy defeat to Brøndby. They strengthened their squad further with the additions of Mathias Ross and Imanol García de Albéniz. In the new league season, Sparta won their opener against Pardubice and advanced through the UEFA Champions League qualifiers, defeating Shamrock Rovers before facing FCSB. After a dramatic 3–2 win over FCSB, Sparta twice defeated Malmö FF for a place in the Champions League group stage for the first time since 2005.

Historical names:

- 1893 — Athletic Club Královské Vinohrady
- 1894 — Athletic Club Sparta
- 1948 — Athletic Club Sparta Bubeneč
- 1949 — Sokol Bratrství Sparta
- 1951 — Sparta ČKD Sokolovo
- 1953 — TJ Spartak Praha Sokolovo
- 1965 — TJ Sparta ČKD Praha
- 1990 — TJ Sparta Praha
- 1991 — AC Sparta Praha
- 1993 — AC Sparta Praha fotbal, a.s.

== Club symbols ==
Colours of Sparta

The name Sparta was inspired by the fighting spirit and courage of the people from the ancient city of Sparta. From the very beginning, the colours of Sparta were blue (symbolizing speed, athletics and sport in general), red and yellow (the official colours of Royal City of Prague). In 1906, one of the members of the committee brought (from his trip to England) jerseys of the London club Arsenal. From that time, Sparta has typically played in their red (or, to be more precise, dark red or maroon) colours.

Another symbol of Sparta is the big "S"; thus, Sparta and Slavia Prague are usually collectively called the Prague "S" and contest the Prague derby. Sparta Prague has three stars above its crest to signify winning 30–39 national league championships, adding a new star for every ten league titles.

The Czech films Why?, Up and Down and Non Plus Ultras take the culture of Sparta fandom as one of their subjects.

== Club identity and supporters ==
In the late 20th and early 21st centuries, Sparta Prague has struggled with its own support base. There is significant evidence of right-wing elements among some of its fans, which has been the subject of ongoing debate. In the 1990s, the chant "Jude Slavia" became a recurring anti-Semitic chant at Sparta Prague games in the 1990s. In 2007, Sparta's then-captain Pavel Horváth gave a fascist salute during a match, allegedly in response to chants of "Sieg Heil" from fans. In May 2025 a group of Sparta fans were photographed wearing white hoods and giving Nazi salutes in Olomouc, which the club condemned, issuing lifetime stadium bans to those involved.

The main ultras group, Letenští, is known for passionate support but has also been linked to nationalist and right-wing sentiments. Despite these issues within parts of the fanbase, Sparta Prague as a club publicly denounces racism and extremist behaviour. The club has taken steps such as banning jerseys with extremist symbols and screening anti-racism videos before matches.

== Stadium ==
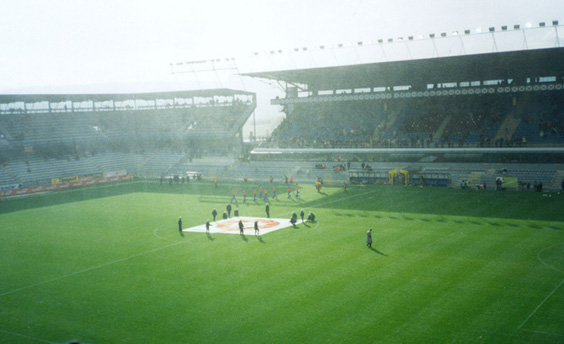
Interior of Generali Arena on a matchday in November 2002

Sparta play their home matches at epet ARENA in the Letná district of Prague. For training, Sparta uses a football centre at Strahov Stadium (formerly the second largest stadium in the world) whose space was rebuilt to eight football pitches (six fields of standard sizes and two futsal-sized). These are currently used as a training facility by first team, youth academy and reserve squad.

== Players ==
=== Current squad ===
As of 1 September 2026

Note: Flags indicate national team as defined under FIFA eligibility rules; some limited exceptions apply. Players may hold more than one non-FIFA nationality.

No.	Pos.	Nation	Player
2	DF	CZE	Martin Suchomel
3	DF	CZE	Pavel Kadeřábek
4	DF	CZE	Jakub Martinec
5	MF	GEQ	Santiago Eneme
6	DF	NOR	Tobias Guddal
7	FW	CRC	Josimar Alcócer
8	MF	DEN	Magnus Kofod Andersen
10	MF	CZE	Adam Karabec
11	DF	CZE	Matěj Ryneš
14	FW	NOR	Jonatan Braut Brunes
15	DF	HUN	Viktor Vitályos
16	DF	NGR	Emmanuel Uchenna
17	MF	ECU	John Mercado
18	MF	SCO	Andy Irving
19	DF	CZE	Adam Ševínský

No.	Pos.	Nation	Player
20	MF	NOR	Sivert Mannsverk
21	MF	PER	Joao Grimaldo
22	DF	FRA	Loïc Mbe Soh
25	DF	NED	Ki-Jana Hoever
26	MF	CZE	Patrik Vydra
27	MF	GAM	Ebrima Singhateh
28	MF	CZE	Roman Macek
29	FW	CZE	Matyáš Vojta
30	DF	CZE	Jaroslav Zelený
31	FW	CZE	Matěj Jurásek (on loan from Norwich City)
38	MF	CZE	Hugo Sochůrek
44	GK	SVK	Jakub Surovčík
47	GK	HUN	Krisztián Hegyi
52	MF	CZE	Ondřej Penxa

=== Out on loan ===
Note: Flags indicate national team as defined under FIFA eligibility rules; some limited exceptions apply. Players may hold more than one non-FIFA nationality.

No.	Pos.	Nation	Player
—	GK	DEN	Peter Vindahl (at Sampdoria)
—	MF	CZE	Michal Ševčík (at Legia Warsaw)
—	FW	CZE	Jan Kuchta (at Legia Warsaw)
—	FW	CMR	Kevin-Prince Milla (at Jablonec)
—	MF	AUS	Garang Kuol (at Jablonec)
—	DF	CZE	Ondřej Kukučka (at Zlín)
—	GK	CZE	Daniel Kerl (at Prostějov)
—	MF	SVK	Dominik Hollý (at Jablonec)

No.	Pos.	Nation	Player
—	DF	CZE	Matyáš Poturnay (at Táborsko)
—	MF	CZE	Roman Mokrovics (at Vysočina Jihlava)
—	MF	CZE	Lukáš Moudrý (at Vysočina Jihlava)
—	DF	CZE	Ferdinand Říha (at Vlašim)
—	GK	CZE	Filip Nalezinek (at Kladno)
—	FW	CZE	Enes Osmani (at Kladno)
—	GK	CZE	Pedro Rodriguez (at Pohronie)

== Player records in the Czech First League ==
As of 18 September 2026.

Highlighted players are in the current squad.

=== Most appearances ===
#	Name	Matches
1	(Czech Republic) Jaromír Blažek	240
2	(Czech Republic) Jiří Novotný	235
3	(Czech Republic) Tomáš Řepka	215
4	(Czech Republic) Michal Horňák	185
5	(Czech Republic) Horst Siegl	179
6	(Czech Republic) Bořek Dočkal	171
7	(Czech Republic) Ladislav Krejčí (1992)	167
8	(Czech Republic) Vratislav Lokvenc	163
8	(Czech Republic) Zdeněk Svoboda	163
10	(Czech Republic) Václav Kadlec	162

=== Most goals ===
#	Name	Goals
1	(Czech Republic) Horst Siegl	92
2	(Czech Republic) David Lafata	83
3	(Czech Republic) Vratislav Lokvenc	74
4	(Czech Republic) Václav Kadlec	50
4	(Czech Republic) Jan Kuchta	50
6	(Slovakia) Lukáš Haraslín	47
7	(Czech Republic) Tomáš Jun	36
8	(Czech Republic) Adam Hložek	34
8	(Czech Republic) Ladislav Krejčí (1999)	34
10	(Czech Republic) Libor Sionko	33
10	(Czech Republic) Josef Hušbauer	33

=== Most clean sheets ===
#	Name	Clean sheets
1	(Czech Republic) Jaromír Blažek	111
2	(Czech Republic) Tomáš Poštulka	40
3	(Czech Republic) Petr Kouba	37
4	(Romania) Florin Niță	36
5	(Czech Republic) Tomáš Vaclík	32

== Coaches ==
- Karel Maleček (1907–11)
- František Malý (1911–18)
- Johny Dick (1919–23)
- Václav Špindler (1924–27)
- Johny Dick (1928–33)
- František Sedlaczek (1933–38)
- Josef Kuchynka (1939–44)
- František Sedlaczek (1945–47)
- Erich Srbek (1948–53, 1957–58)
- Vlastimil Preis
- Karel Senecký
- Jiří Šimonek
- Karel Kolský (1959–63)
- Jaroslav Štumpf
- Václav Ježek (1964–69)
- Milan Navara
- Karel Kolský (1970–71)
- Tadeusz Kraus (1971–74)
- Ivan Mráz
- Zdeněk Roček
- Štefan Čambal (1975–76)
- Zdeněk Roček (1976)
- Dušan Uhrin (1976)
- Arnošt Hložek (1977–78)
- Antonín Rýgr (1978)
- Jiří Rubáš (1978–81)
- Dušan Uhrin (1981–82)
- Václav Ježek (1982–84)
- Vladimír Táborský (1984–85)
- Ján Zachar (1985–86)
- Václav Ježek (1986–88)
- Jozef Jarabinský (1988–90)
- Václav Ježek (1990–91)
- Dušan Uhrin (1991–93)
- Karol Dobiáš (1993–94)
- Jozef Chovanec (1994)
- Vladimír Borovička (1994)
- Jürgen Sundermann (October 1994 – March 1995)
- Jozef Jarabinský (March 1995 – December 1995)
- Vlastimil Petržela (1996)
- Jozef Chovanec (August 1996 – June 1998)
- Zdeněk Ščasný (July 1998 – June 1999)
- Ivan Hašek (July 1999 – June 2001)
- Jaroslav Hřebík (2001–02)
- Vítězslav Lavička (April–June 2002)
- Jozef Jarabinský (July–December 2002)
- Jiří Kotrba (February 2003 – March 2004)
- František Straka (March 2004 – December 2004)
- Jaroslav Hřebík (December 2004 – December 2005)
- Stanislav Griga (December 2005 – August 2006)
- Michal Bílek (September 2006 – June 2008)
- Jozef Chovanec (June – July 2008)
- Vítězslav Lavička (July – October 2008)
- Jozef Chovanec (October 2008 – December 2011)
- Martin Hašek (December 2011 – May 2012)
- Vítězslav Lavička (July 2012 – April 2015)
- Zdeněk Ščasný (April 2015 – September 2016)
- David Holoubek (September 2016 – December 2016)
- Tomáš Požár (December 2016 – March 2017)
- Petr Rada (March 2017 – May 2017)
- Andrea Stramaccioni (May 2017 – March 2018)
- Pavel Hapal (March 2018 – July 2018)
- Zdeněk Ščasný (August 2018 – April 2019)
- Michal Horňák (April 2019 – June 2019)
- Václav Jílek (June 2019 – February 2020)
- Václav Kotal (February 2020 – February 2021)
- Pavel Vrba (February 2021 – May 2022)
- Michal Horňák (May 2022)
- Brian Priske (June 2022 – June 2024)
- Lars Friis (June 2024 – May 2025)
- Luboš Loučka (May 2025)
- Brian Priske (June 2025 – present)

== Current technical staff ==
As of 9 September 2026

Position	Name
Head coach	(Denmark) Brian Priske
Assistant coach	(Republic of Ireland) Diarmuid O'Carroll (Denmark) Lukas Babalola
Goalkeeper coach	(Czech Republic) Daniel Zítka (Czech Republic) Martin Ticháček (Czech Republic) Aleš Hruška
Reserve coach	(Czech Republic) Luboš Loučka
Development coach	(Czech Republic) Libor Kozák
Head of performance	(Denmark) Christian Clarup
Fitness coach	(Czech Republic) Tomáš Malý (Czech Republic) Radek Říha
Analysts	(Czech Republic) Ondřej Janda (Slovakia) Marko Krigovský (Czech Republic) Petr Kouba
Sports scientist	(Greece) Nikolaos Asimakidis
Team manager	(Czech Republic) Miroslav Baranek
Kitman	(Czech Republic) Luděk Stracený (Czech Republic) Tomáš Majer

== European statistics ==
The following is a list of the all-time statistics from Sparta's games in the three UEFA tournaments it has participated in, as well as the overall total. The list contains the tournament, the number of games played (Pld), won (W), drawn (D) and lost (L). The statistics include qualification matches.

As of 24 February 2022

Competition	Pld	W	D	L	GF	GA	GD
European Cup/UEFA Champions League	146	54	29	63	190	204	–14
Cup Winners' Cup	30	15	5	10	68	32	+36
UEFA Cup/UEFA Europa League	124	50	34	40	175	153	+22
UEFA Europa Conference League	2	0	0	2	1	3	–2
Total	302	119	68	115	434	392	+42

=== UEFA club coefficient ranking ===
As of 31 March 2026

Rank	Team	Points
62	(Spain) Sevilla	39.000
63	(Spain) Athletic Bilbao	38.750
64	(Czech Republic) Sparta Prague	38.250
65	(Slovakia) Slovan Bratislava	36.000
66	(France) Rennais	35.000

== Honours ==
=== Domestic ===
- Bohemian Football Union Championship/Czechoslovak First League/Czech First League:
  - Winners (38): 1912, 1919, 1922, 1925–26, 1926–27, 1931–32, 1935–36, 1937–38, 1938–39, 1943–44, 1945–46, 1947–48, 1952, 1954, 1964–65, 1966–67, 1983–84, 1984–85, 1986–87, 1987–88, 1988–89, 1989–90, 1990–91, 1992–93, 1993–94, 1994–95, 1996–97, 1997–98, 1998–99, 1999–2000, 2000–01, 2002–03, 2004–05, 2006–07, 2009–10, 2013–14, 2022–23, 2023–24
- Czechoslovak Cup/Czech Cup:
  - Winners (16): 1963–64, 1971–72, 1975–76, 1979–80, 1983–84, 1987–88, 1988–89, 1991–92, 1995–96, 2003–04, 2005–06, 2006–07, 2007–08, 2013–14, 2019–20, 2023–24
- Czech Supercup:
  - Winners (2): 2010, 2014

=== Continental ===
- Mitropa Cup (Central European Cup)
  - Winners (3): 1927, 1935, 1964

== Club records ==
- Biggest home win: Sparta Prague 12–0 Galatasaray SK (1921–22)

=== Czech First League records ===
- Best position: 1st (see Honours)
- Worst position: 5th (2005–06, 2017–18)
- Biggest home win: Sparta 7–0 České Budějovice (1999–2000)
- Biggest away win: Žižkov 1–6 Sparta (1998–99), Hradec Králové 0–5 Sparta (2001–02), Most 0–5 Sparta (2007–08), Brno 0–5 Sparta (2010–11), Mladá Boleslav 0–5 Sparta (2023–24)
- Biggest home defeat: Sparta 0–3 Jablonec (2006–07), Sparta 1–4 Slavia (2008–09), Sparta 0–3 Liberec (2011–12), Sparta 0–3 Mladá Boleslav (2011–12), Sparta 0–3 Plzeň (2015–16), Sparta 0–3 Slavia (2019–20)
- Biggest away defeat: Plzeň 4–0 Sparta (2018–19, 2023–24), Slovácko 4–0 Sparta (2021–22), Slavia 4–0 Sparta (2022–23)
