= 1999–2000 Czech First League =

7th season of top-tier football league in Czech Republic

Czech First League
- Season: 1999–2000
- Champions: Sparta Prague
- Relegated: Opava; Hradec Králové
- Champions League: Sparta Prague; Slavia Prague
- UEFA Cup: Drnovice; Liberec (via Domestic Cup)
- Intertoto Cup: Příbram; Blšany; Olomouc
- Matches: 240
- Goals: 570 (2.38 per match)
- Top goalscorer: Vratislav Lokvenc (22)
- Biggest home win: Sparta Prague 7–0 Č. Budějovice
- Biggest away win: Č. Budějovice 1–4 Sparta Prague; Blšany 1–4 Slavia Prague
- Highest scoring: Sparta Prague 7–0 Č. Budějovice
- Highest attendance: 23,800; Brno 1–1 Sparta Prague
- Lowest attendance: 1,203; Bohemians Prague 1–1 Blšany
- Average attendance: 5,972

The 1999–2000 Czech First League, known as the Gambrinus liga for sponsorship reasons, was the seventh season of top-tier football in the Czech Republic.

== Stadia and locations ==
Location of clubs in the 1999–2000 Czech First League

== League table ==
Pos	Team	Pld	W	D	L	GF	GA	GD	Pts	Qualification or relegation
1	Sparta Prague (C)	30	24	4	2	81	23	+58	76	Qualification for Champions League third qualifying round
2	Slavia Prague	30	21	5	4	53	25	+28	68	Qualification for Champions League second qualifying round
3	Drnovice	30	14	6	10	36	32	+4	48	Qualification for UEFA Cup qualifying round
4	Brno	30	12	6	12	35	33	+2	42	
5	Teplice	30	10	11	9	38	38	0	41	
6	Dukla Příbram	30	11	7	12	33	36	−3	40	Qualification for Intertoto Cup second round
7	Bohemians Prague	30	10	10	10	24	28	−4	40	
8	Slovan Liberec	30	9	11	10	21	24	−3	38	Qualification for UEFA Cup first round (Note: Slovan Liberec won the 1999–2000 Czech Cup and qualified for the first round of the UEFA Cup.)
9	Viktoria Žižkov	30	9	10	11	37	41	−4	37	
10	Blšany	30	10	7	13	28	45	−17	37	Qualification for Intertoto Cup second round
11	Baník Ostrava	30	8	11	11	43	45	−2	35	
12	Sigma Olomouc	30	7	13	10	31	38	−7	34	Qualification for Intertoto Cup first round
13	České Budějovice	30	9	5	16	34	49	−15	32	
14	Jablonec	30	7	11	12	24	36	−12	32	
15	Opava (R)	30	6	10	14	31	39	−8	28	Relegation to Czech 2. Liga
16	Hradec Králové (R)	30	4	11	15	21	38	−17	23	Relegation to Czech 2. Liga

Source: Fortuna liga
Rules for classification: 1) points; 2) head-to-head points; 3) head-to-head goal difference; 4) head-to-head goals scored; 5) goal difference; 6) number of goals scored.
(C) Champions; (R) Relegated

== Results ==
Home \ Away	OST	BLŠ	BOH	BRN	ČBU	DRN	PŘÍ	HRK	JAB	OPA	OLO	SLA	LIB	SPA	TEP	VŽI
Baník Ostrava		6–1	1–1	1–0	1–1	3–1	2–0	2–2	1–1	2–2	2–2	1–3	3–0	0–3	2–2	1–1
Blšany	1–0		1–0	1–0	3–2	0–2	2–1	1–0	1–2	1–0	1–0	2–3	1–0	1–4	0–2	0–2
Bohemians Prague	0–0	1–1		0–0	0–1	3–1	2–0	1–0	2–0	1–0	1–3	0–1	2–0	0–1	0–0	1–0
Brno	2–1	3–0	1–1		2–0	2–3	0–0	1–2	2–0	1–0	1–0	3–1	3–0	1–1	2–1	4–2
České Budějovice	2–2	2–2	1–2	1–0		2–0	5–0	2–1	2–0	1–0	1–2	0–1	0–1	1–4	3–1	1–0
Drnovice	1–0	2–0	3–0	2–0	2–0		2–1	1–0	3–0	1–1	1–0	0–1	1–1	0–1	1–1	1–0
Dukla Příbram	2–0	1–0	3–0	1–2	1–0	1–1		1–0	2–1	1–0	0–2	1–1	1–1	1–3	3–0	5–2
Hradec Králové	1–3	1–1	1–2	1–0	1–0	0–2	1–1		0–0	2–2	0–0	0–1	1–3	0–2	2–0	0–0
Jablonec	2–2	4–2	1–2	0–0	2–1	1–0	0–2	0–0		4–0	0–0	0–0	0–0	0–2	3–1	3–0
Opava	2–3	0–0	0–0	4–1	3–2	2–0	0–1	0–0	2–0		3–0	0–0	3–1	1–1	1–1	0–1
Sigma Olomouc	4–1	0–1	0–0	1–1	1–1	1–2	1–0	2–2	0–0	2–1		0–2	1–1	1–1	2–2	2–0
Slavia Prague	2–0	2–1	2–0	3–1	4–1	2–1	3–1	3–0	4–0	3–1	2–0		0–0	2–1	0–1	3–1
Slovan Liberec	1–0	1–1	2–0	0–1	2–0	0–0	0–0	1–0	0–0	1–0	0–0	0–1		1–2	2–0	1–0
Sparta Prague	2–0	3–1	0–0	3–0	7–0	5–0	2–1	3–1	3–0	4–0	6–0	5–1	2–1		3–2	2–1
Teplice	0–2	0–0	2–0	2–1	3–0	2–2	2–0	1–1	2–0	1–1	2–1	1–1	1–0	4–2		0–0
Viktoria Žižkov	3–1	1–1	2–2	1–0	1–1	2–0	1–1	2–1	0–0	3–2	3–3	3–1	0–0	2–3	3–1	

Source: Fortuna liga
Legend: Blue = home team win; Yellow = draw; Red = away team win.

== Top goalscorers ==
Rank	Player	Club	Goals
1	(Czech Republic) Vratislav Lokvenc	Sparta Prague	22
2	(Czech Republic) Marek Kincl	Slovan Liberec / Viktoria Žižkov	16
3	(Czech Republic) Stanislav Vlček	Sigma Olomouc	13
4	(Czech Republic) Vítězslav Tuma	Drnovice	11
4	(Czech Republic) Tomáš Janda	České Budějovice	11
4	(Czech Republic) Tomáš Došek	Slavia Prague	11
4	(Czech Republic) Horst Siegl	Sparta Prague	11

== Attendances ==
#	Club	Average
1	Opava	11,234
2	Brno	9,678
3	Teplice	8,415
4	Příbram	7,108
5	Sparta Praha	6,896
6	Slavia Praha	6,737
7	Sigma Olomouc	6,662
8	Česke Budějovice	5,462
9	Bohemians	5,112
10	Baník Ostrava	4,794
11	Drnovice	4,573
12	Jablonec	4,201
13	Viktoria Žižkov	3,913
14	Hradec Králové	3,713
15	Slovan Liberec	3,429
16	Blšany	3,320

== See also ==
- 1999–2000 Czech Cup
- 1999–2000 Czech 2. Liga
