= 2019–20 Czech Cup =

MOL Cup

Tournament details
- Country: Czech Republic
- Teams: 156

Final positions
- Champions: Sparta Prague (7th title)
- Runners-up: Liberec

The 2019–20 Czech Cup, known as the MOL Cup for sponsorship reasons, was the 27th season of the annual knockout football tournament of the Czech Republic. It began with the preliminary round on 26 July 2019 and concluded with the final on 1 July 2020. The winner of the cup gained the right to play in the third qualifying round of the 2020–21 UEFA Europa League.

== Teams ==
Round	Clubs remaining	Clubs involved	Winners from previous round	New entries this round	Leagues entering at this round
Preliminary round	156	108	none	108	Bohemian Football League; Moravian–Silesian Football League; Levels 4 and 5 in football league pyramid
First round	102	86	54	32	Czech National Football League (16); Bohemian Football League (12); Moravian–Silesian Football League (4)
Second round	59	54	43	11	Czech First League – teams not playing in UEFA competitions
Third round	32	32	27	5	Czech First League – teams entered into UEFA competitions
Fourth round	16	16	16	none	none
Quarter-finals	8	8	8	none	none
Semi-finals	4	4	4	none	none
Final	2	2	2	none	none

== Preliminary round ==
108 teams took part in this stage of the competition.

26 July 2019	FC Vsetín	3–5	TJ Valašské Meziříčí	Vsetín
19:00	Matůš 30'; Hořelica 86'; Bublák 90'	Report	Farkaš 28'; Vrána 37', 75'; Daniš 72'; Výmola 90+1'	Stadium: Stadion Tyršova ulice

27 July 2019	1.FC Olešnice u Bouzova	1–0	FK Nové Sady	Bouzov
18:00	Malínek 52'	Report		Stadium: Hřiště Olešnice - tráva

27 July 2019	FK SK Polanka nad Odrou	0–3	FK Nový Jičín	Ostrava
18:00		Report	Smolarčík 32', 83'; M. Janovský 76'	Stadium: Hřiště Polanka nad Odrou

27 July 2019	TJ Skaštice	2–2 (a.e.t.) (3–2 p)	FK Blansko	Skaštice
18:00	Zavadil 21'; J. Gojš 64'	Report	Urbančok 73'; Bednář 90+2' (pen.)	Stadium: Hřiště Skaštice

27 July 2019	TJ Start Brno	1–5	SFK Vrchovina	Brno
18:00	Musil 29'	Report	Vícha 10'; Dobrovolný 11'; Michal 45+1' (pen.), 65'; Skalník 86'	Stadium: Stadion SK Žebětín

27 July 2019	FC Žďas Žďár nad Sázavou	1–2	A.F.C. Humpolec	Žďár nad Sázavou
18:00	T. Trojánek 23'	Report	Šerý 40'; Pešek 86'	Stadium: Stadion Bouchalky

27 July 2019	TJ Sokol Želetava	2–4 (a.e.t.)	TJ Sokol Tasovice	Želetava
18:00	Vrbka 28'; Jičínský 85'	Report	Lapeš 19', 76', 95', 120'	Stadium: Fotbalové hřiště Sokol Želetava

27 July 2019	1. BFK Frýdlant nad Ostravicí	0–2	FC Dolní Benešov	Frýdlant nad Ostravicí
19:00		Report	Býma 16'; Baránek 58'	Stadium: Stadion 1. BFK Frýdlant

28 July 2019	TJ Unie Hlubina	3–1	FC Heřmanice Slezská	Ostrava
16:00	J. Dziža 14', 50'; J. Schmutz 17'	Report	Kopečný 36'	Stadium: Stadion TJ Unie Hlubina

28 July 2019	FC Elseremo Brumov	0–4	FC Strání	Brumov-Bylnice
18:00		Report	Michalec 22'; Lorenc 28'; Bruštík 81'; Čaňo 86'	Stadium: Stadion FC Elseremo Brumov

28 July 2019	FC Slavoj Olympia Bruntál	2–3	SK Jiskra Rýmařov	Bruntál
18:00	J. Urban 8'; Kyselý 83' (pen.)	Report	Navrátil 5', 13', 65'	Stadium: Městský fotbalový štadión FC Slavoj Olympia Bruntál

28 July 2019	TJ Slovan Bzenec	0–2	FC Slovan Rosice	Bzenec
18:00		Report	Drbal 51'; Nedvěd 70'	Stadium: Fotbalový Stadión Bzenec

28 July 2019	SK Dětmarovice	2–1 (a.e.t.)	FK Bospor Bohumín	Dětmarovice
18:00	T. Mičola 84'; D. Řapek 70'	Report	J. Padych 70'	Stadium: Fotbalové hříště SK Dětmarovice

28 July 2019	SK Beskyd Frenštát pod Radhoštěm	3–0	FK Kozlovice	Frenštát pod Radhoštěm
18:00	Malý 31'; Klimpar 46'; Špaček 80'	Report		Stadium: Stadion Na Nivách

28 July 2019	MFK Havířov	1–2	FC Hlučín	Havířov
18:00	Malcharek 11'	Report	Jančík 21'; Štefek 41'	Stadium: Stadion Dukla

28 July 2019	1. HFK Olomouc	2–0	MFK Vyškov	Olomouc
18:00	Spurný 17'; Stoklasa 90'	Report		Stadium: Stadion 1.HFK Olomouc

28 July 2019	TJ Sokol Lanžhot	3–1	FK Hodonín	Lanžhot
18:00	Dovhanyuk 10', 29'; Krejčíř 79'	Report	Konečný 71'	Stadium: Na Šlajsi

28 July 2019	TJ Sokol Nevšová	0–9	FC TVD Slavičín	Slavičín
18:00		Report	Kořenek 4', 29', 32', 36', 80'; Svach 16', 47'; Rožek 73'; Staněk 90'	Stadium: Fotbalové hřiště TJ Sokol Nevšová

28 July 2019	Slavoj TKZ Polná	1–3	FSC Stará Říše	Polná
18:00	Bajer 16'	Report	Nehyba 69', 90+1'; Zaichek 74'	Stadium: Stadion Slavoj Polná

28 July 2019	FK SAN-JV Šumperk	1–6	SK Hanácká Slavia Kroměříž	Šumperk
18:00	Smrž 90' (pen.)	Report	Marchuk 8'; Zavadil 22'; Cupák 51'; Votava 78'; Mlčoch 82'; Silný 83'	Stadium: Městský Stadion

28 July 2019	Viktorie Přerov	0–5	FC Viktoria Otrokovice	Přerov
18:00

28 July 2019	FC Spartak Velká Bíteš	1–3	FC Velké Meziříčí	Velká Bíteš
18:00	Merdita 67'	Report	Bartoš 2' (o.g.); Komínek 22'; Šuta 26'	Stadium: Fotbalový Stadión Velká Bíteš

28 July 2019	TJ Tatran Všechovice	3–2	SK Hranice	Všechovice
18:00	Hulman 15'; Šindelek 68'; Plešek 90+2'	Report	Kuchař 18'; Rak 51'	Stadium: Hrište Všechovice

28 July 2019	SK Ždírec nad Doubravou	1–0	FC Slovan Havlíčkův Brod	Ždírec nad Doubravou
18:00	Vopršal 40'	Report		Stadium: Stadion SK Tatran

31 July 2019	TJ Spartak Soběslav	3–0	FK Jindřichův Hradec 1910	Soběslav
18:30	L. Králíček 19' (o.g.); Dvořák 43'; Vaněk 76'	Report		Stadium: Fotbalové hřiště TJ Spartak Soběslav

2 August 2019	MFK Dobříš	5–2	SK Klatovy 1898	Dobříš
19:00	Kopečný 47', 65'; Puchmajer 67'; Junek 71', 89'	Report	Diviš 7', 43'	Stadium: Stadion MFK Dobříš

3 August 2019	TJ Dvůr Králové	3–1	SK Benátky nad Jizerou	Dvůr Králové nad Labem
11:15	Karal 71'; Vitebský 73'; Knespl 80' (pen.)	Report	Šimek 42'	Stadium: Stadion Pod Hankovým domem

3 August 2019	SK Kladno	2–0	FK Ostrov	Kladno
11:15	Procházka 25'; Kraus 27'	Report		Stadium: Stadion Františka Kloze

3 August 2019	FK Sparta Kutná Hora	0–1	FK Meteor Prague VIII	Kutná Hora
11:15		Report

3 August 2019	FK Seko Louny	0–2	FK Brandýs nad Labem	Louny
11:15			Šmejkal 7'; Baloun 82'	Stadium: Městský stadion

3 August 2019	FC Chomutov	1–0	FK Neratovice-Byškovice	Chomutov
11:30

3 August 2019	FK Komárov	1–0	FK Hořovicko	Komárov
11:30

3 August 2019	SK Petřín Plzeň	1–2	Sokol Hostouň	Plzeň
11:30

3 August 2019	FK Admira Prague	2–1	TJ Sokol Živanice	Prague
18:00

3 August 2019	Union Beroun	3–0	TJ Tatran Rakovník	Beroun
18:00

3 August 2019	FK Olympie Březová	3–2	SK Senco Doubravka	Březová
18:00

3 August 2019	Arsenal Česká Lípa	2–2 (a.e.t.) (2–3 p)	FK Motorlet Prague	Česká Lípa
18:00

3 August 2019	FC Hlinsko	0–1	FK Kolín	Hlinsko
18:00

3 August 2019	FK Hvězda Cheb	3–5	FK Zbuzany 1953	Cheb
18:00

3 August 2019	FK OEZ Letohrad	1–0	FK Čáslav	Letohrad
18:00

3 August 2019	SK Libčany	3–2	SK Polaban Nymburk	Libčany
18:00

3 August 2019	FC Viktoria Mariánské Lázně	2–0	SK Rakovník	Mariánské Lázně
18:00

3 August 2019	SKP Slovan Moravská Třebová	0–5	SK Vysoké Mýto	Moravská Třebová
18:00

3 August 2019	FK Náchod	3–0	FC Horky nad Jizerou	Náchod
18:00

3 August 2019	TJ Nová Včelnice	0–10	TJ Tatran Sedlčany	Nová Včelnice
18:00

3 August 2019	TJ Baník Union Nové Sedlo	0–5	FK Baník Souš	Nové Sedlo
18:00

3 August 2019	SK Poříčany	2–4	SK Český Brod	Poříčany
18:00

3 August 2019	FC Přední Kopanina	1–3	Sportovní sdružení Ostrá	Přední Kopanina
18:00

3 August 2019	FC Rokycany	1–2	SK Aritma Prague	Rokycany
18:00

3 August 2019	SK Skalice	0–2	TJ Sokol Libiš	Skalice u České Lípy
18:00

3 August 2019	SK Slaný	3–2	TJ Přeštice	Slaný
18:00

3 August 2019	TJ Sokol Srbice	2–2 (a.e.t.) (3–2 p)	SK Sokol Brozany	Srbice
18:00

3 August 2019	SK Štětí	3–4 (a.e.t.)	FK Velké Hamry	Štětí
18:00

7 August 2019	MFK Trutnov	0–3	FK Přepeře	Trutnov
19:00

== First round ==
7 August 2019	FK Náchod	0–5	FK Viktoria Žižkov	Náchod
18:30

13 August 2019	SK Kladno	1–2	FK TJ Štěchovice
17:00

13 August 2019	FK Brandýs nad Labem	0–10	FK Ústí nad Labem
18:00

13 August 2019	FK Olympie Březová	0–3	FC Viktoria Mariánské Lázně
18:00

13 August 2019	FK Meteor Prague VIII	1–3	MFK Chrudim
18:00

14 August 2019	SK Jiskra Rýmařov	2–3	SK Uničov
17:00

14 August 2019	1. HFK Olomouc	0–3	FC Zbrojovka Brno
17:00

14 August 2019	Sokol Hostouň	2–1	FC Slavia Karlovy Vary
17:00

14 August 2019	TJ Sokol Libiš	0–2	SK Zápy
17:00

14 August 2019	FK Spartak Soběslav	0–2	SK Benešov
17:00

14 August 2019	FK Nový Jičín	2–3	MFK Frýdek-Místek
17:00

14 August 2019	Český lev - Union Beroun	0–7	Dukla Prague
17:00

14 August 2019	TJ Skaštice	3–5	SK Líšeň
17:00

14 August 2019	FC Slovan Rosice	4–2	FC Velké Meziříčí
17:00

14 August 2019	FK Přepeře	6–2	TJ Dvůr Králové
17:00

14 August 2019	TJ Tatran Všechovice	0–4	FC Odra Petřkovice
17:00

14 August 2019	FK Velké Hamry	0–4	FK Varnsdorf
17:00

14 August 2019	TJ Valašské Meziříčí	4–2 (a.e.t.)	FC TVD Slavičín
17:00

14 August 2019	TJ Unie Hlubina	1–2	FC Dolní Benešov
17:00

14 August 2019	TJ Sokol Srbice	1–2	FK Králův Dvůr
17:00

14 August 2019	TJ Tatran Sedlčany	0–4	FC MAS Táborsko
17:00

14 August 2019	SK Ždírec nad Doubravou	3–1 (a.e.t.)	FSC Stará Říše
17:00

14 August 2019	FC Strání	1–3	1. SK Prostějov
17:00

14 August 2019	1. FC Olešnice u Bouzova	2–1	FC Viktoria Otrokovice
17:00

14 August 2019	FK Baník Souš	0–3	FK Baník Sokolov
17:00

14 August 2019	SK Aritma Prague	0–1	FK Admira Prague
17:00

14 August 2019	SK Beskyd Frenštát pod Radhoštěm	1–2	FC Hlučín
17:00

14 August 2019	FK Zbuzany 1953	1–3	TJ Jiskra Domažlice
17:00

14 August 2019	SK Dětmarovice	1–7	FK Fotbal Třinec
17:00

14 August 2019	SK Český Brod	1–3	FC Slovan Velvary
17:00

14 August 2019	FK Motorlet Prague	4–0	FC Chomutov
17:00

14 August 2019	FK OEZ Letohrad	0–3	FC Hradec Králové
17:00

14 August 2019	TJ Sokol Lanžhot	1–1 (a.e.t.) (3–1 p)	1. SC Znojmo
17:00

14 August 2019	SK Hanácká Slavia Kroměříž	2–2 (a.e.t.) (3–4 p)	FC Vítkovice
17:00

14 August 2019	FK Komárov	0–1	Loko Vltavín
17:00

14 August 2019	A.F.C. Humpolec	0–9	FC Vysočina Jihlava
17:00

14 August 2019	FK Kolín	0–1	TJ Jiskra Ústí nad Orlicí
17:00

14 August 2019	SK Libčany	0–3	FK Chlumec nad Cidlinou
17:30

14 August 2019	SK Slaný	0–4	FC Slavoj Vyšehrad
17:30

14 August 2019	SS Ostrá	1–3	FC Sellier & Bellot Vlašim
17:30

14 August 2019	MFK Dobříš	0–2	FC Písek
18:00

20 August 2019	TJ Sokol Tasovice	0–1	SFK Vrchovina
17:00

20 August 2019	SK Vysoké Mýto	0–2	FK Pardubice
17:00

== Second round ==
The second round fixtures were drawn on 19 August 2019 live on ČT Sport.

27 August 2019	SFK Vrchovina	0–5	1. FC Slovácko
17:00

27 August 2019	TJ Valašské Meziříčí	0–5	FK Fotbal Třinec
17:00

27 August 2019	FC Dolní Benešov	2–3	1. SK Prostějov
17:00

27 August 2019	FC Slovan Rosice	1–5	SK Sigma Olomouc
17:00

28 August 2019	SK Ždírec nad Doubravou	0–4	SK Líšeň
17:00

28 August 2019	1. FC Olešnice u Bouzova	0–6	SFC Opava
17:00

28 August 2019	SK Uničov	1–4	FC Fastav Zlín
17:00

28 August 2019	MFK Frýdek-Místek	1–3	MFK Karviná
17:00

28 August 2019	FC Odra Petřkovice	3–4	FC Zbrojovka Brno
17:00

28 August 2019	TJ Sokol Lanžhot	1–3	FC Baník Ostrava
17:00

28 August 2019	FK Králův Dvůr	0–2	FK Dukla Prague
17:00

28 August 2019	TJ Jiskra Domažlice	2–2 (a.e.t.) (4–3 p)	FK Ústí nad Labem
17:00

28 August 2019	SK Zápy	2–3	Bohemians 1905
17:00

28 August 2019	FC Písek	1–3	FK Teplice
17:00

28 August 2019	TJ Jiskra Ústí nad Orlicí	0–2	SK Dynamo České Budějovice
17:00

28 August 2019	Loko Vltavín	2–1	FC Sellier & Bellot Vlašim
17:00

28 August 2019	FK Chlumec nad Cidlinou	2–1	1. FK Příbram
17:00

28 August 2019	FC Slovan Velvary	1–3	FK Viktoria Žižkov
17:00

28 August 2019	FC Viktoria Mariánské Lázně	2–5	FC Slovan Liberec
18:00

28 August 2019	FK Přepeře	0–1	MFK Chrudim
17:00

28 August 2019	FK Motorlet Prague	0–5	FC Slavoj Vyšehrad
17:00

28 August 2019	FC MAS Táborsko	4–4 (a.e.t.) (3–5 p)	FK Varnsdorf
17:00

28 August 2019	FK TJ Štěchovice	1–4	FK Baník Sokolov
17:30

3 September 2019	SK Benešov	2–1	FK Pardubice
17:00

4 September 2019	FK Admira Prague	1–2	FC Hradec Králové
17:00

4 September 2019	Sokol Hostouň	1–6	FC Vysočina Jihlava
17:30

10 September 2019	FC Hlučín	4–2	FC Vítkovice
16:30

== Third round ==
24 September 2019	SK Benešov	1–3	1. FC Slovácko
16:00

24 September 2019	FK Baník Sokolov	0–1	SFC Opava
16:00

24 September 2019	FK Varnsdorf	1–2	FC Fastav Zlín
16:30

25 September 2019	Loko Vltavín	1–4	SK Dynamo České Budějovice
16:00

25 September 2019	TJ Jiskra Domažlice	1–3	FK Dukla Prague
16:00

25 September 2019	SK Slavia Prague	8–0	FC Slavoj Vyšehrad
16:00

25 September 2019	MFK Karviná	0–2	FK Viktoria Žižkov
16:00

25 September 2019	FC Hlučín	1–3	FC Viktoria Plzeň
16:00

25 September 2019	FC Vysočina Jihlava	1–2	AC Sparta Prague
17:00

25 September 2019	FC Slovan Liberec	3–1	1. SK Prostějov
17:30

25 September 2019	FC Baník Ostrava	2–0	FC Hradec Králové
18:00

1 October 2019	FK Teplice	2–1	FK Fotbal Třinec
16:00

1 October 2019	FK Mladá Boleslav	4–2	MFK Chrudim
16:00

1 October 2019	FK Jablonec	3–2	FC Zbrojovka Brno
16:30

1 October 2019	SK Sigma Olomouc	4–2	SK Líšeň
17:00

2 October 2019	FK Chlumec nad Cidlinou	2–1	Bohemians 1905
16:00

== Fourth round ==
The fourth round draw took place on the 4 October 2019.

29 October 2019	SFC Opava	0–2 (a.e.t.)	FK Jablonec

29 October 2019	SK Sigma Olomouc	4–0	FK Dukla Prague

30 October 2019	FC Baník Ostrava	2–0 (a.e.t.)	SK Slavia Prague

30 October 2019	FK Chlumec nad Cidlinou	3–4 (a.e.t.)	FC Viktoria Plzeň

30 October 2019	SK Dynamo České Budějovice	0–4	AC Sparta Prague

30 October 2019	FK Mladá Boleslav	3–1	FC Fastav Zlín

30 October 2019	FC Slovan Liberec	2–0	FK Teplice

6 November 2019	1. FC Slovácko	3–1 (a.e.t.)	FK Viktoria Žižkov

== Quarter-finals ==
4 March 2020	SK Sigma Olomouc	3–1	FK Jablonec	Olomouc
17:00	Hála 24'; Chytil 50'; Juliš 69'		88' Pleštil	Stadium: Andrův stadion Attendance: 2,945; Referee: Pavel Julínek

4 March 2020	1. FC Slovácko	0–0 (a.e.t.) (2–4 p)	FC Slovan Liberec	Uherské Hradiště
17:30				Stadium: Městský fotbalový stadion Miroslava Valenty; Attendance: 3,043; Referee: Pavel Královec
	Penalties
	Daníček (penalty scored); Havlík (penalty missed); Dvořák (penalty missed); Juroška (penalty scored)		(penalty scored) Mara; (penalty scored) Pešek; (penalty missed) Chaluš; (penalty scored) Karafiát; (penalty scored) Malinský

4 March 2020	FC Viktoria Plzeň	4–2	FK Mladá Boleslav	Plzeň
17:30	Kopic 33'; Beauguel 39'; Kayamba 45'; Řezník 49'		77', 85' Budínský	Stadium: Doosan Arena; Attendance: 4,519; Referee: Pavel Orel

4 March 2020	AC Sparta Prague	5–0	FC Baník Ostrava	Prague
18:00	Hancko 20'; Tetteh 54'; Moberg Karlsson 62' (pen.); Frýdek 76'; Hložek 81'			Stadium: Generali Česká pojišťovna Arena; Attendance: 9,097; Referee: Ondřej Berka

== Semi-finals ==
17 June 2020	SK Sigma Olomouc	1–2	FC Slovan Liberec	Olomouc
17:15	Juliš 54'		29' Pešek; 45+1' Alibekov	Stadium: Andrův stadion Attendance: 1,807; Referee: Pavel Orel

17 June 2020	AC Sparta Prague	2–1	FC Viktoria Plzeň	Prague
20:15	Kanga 15' (pen.); Kozák 28'		90' Havel	Stadium: Generali Česká pojišťovna Arena; Attendance: 1,951; Referee: Ondřej Pechanec

== Final ==
1 July 2020	FC Slovan Liberec	1–2	AC Sparta Prague	Liberec
20:15	Pešek 50'	Report	65' Moberg Karlsson; 74' (pen.) Kanga	Stadium: Stadion u Nisy; Referee: Pavel Královec

== See also ==
- 2019–20 Czech First League
- 2019–20 Czech National Football League
