= Jaroslav Kolínek =

Czech footballer (born 1972)

Personal information
- Date of birth: 12 September 1972 (age 52)
- Place of birth: Sobotín, Czechoslovakia
- Position(s): Defender

Senior career*
| Years | Team | Apps | (Gls) |
| –1994 | Hranice | | |
| 1994–2001 | Opava | 138 | (9) |
| 2002 | 1. HFK Olomouc | 11 | (1) |
| 2002–2003 | Vítkovice | 11 | (1) |
| 2003–2004 | Tatran Jakubčovice | | |
| 2004–2005 | Skonto | 41 | (7) |
| 2005–2011 | Opava | 97 | (7) |
- *Club domestic league appearances and goals

Jaroslav Kolínek (born 12 September 1972) is a Czech retired footballer who played as a defender. He spent most of his career in SFC Opava.

== Life ==
He is a native of Sobotín, Czech Republic. He has two older brothers. He attended a secondary vocational school of energy. He skied as a child.

== Playing career ==
He mainly operated as a defender. He started his career with SK Hranice. In 1994, he signed for SFC Opava. In 2002, he signed for 1. HFK Olomouc. After that, he signed for MFK Vítkovice. In 2003, he signed for TJ Tatran Jakubčovice. In 2004, he signed for Latvian side Skonto FC. In 2005, he returned to Opava. He captained the club.

== Managerial career ==
In 2021, he was appointed sporting director of SFC Opava. He received blame from some supporters who blamed him for the club almost suffering relegation.
