= Karal =

Karal may refer to:

- Former name of Katnajur
- Karal, Chad, sub-prefecture of Hadjer-Lamis Region in Chad
- Karal Ann Marling, American cultural historian and writer
- Vlastimil Karal, Czech footballer
- Enver Ziya Karal
