= 1990–91 Czechoslovak First League =

Czechoslovak First League
- Season: 1990–91
- Champions: Sparta Prague
- Relegated: Nitra; Zbrojovka Brno
- European Cup: Sparta Prague
- Cup Winners' Cup: Baník Ostrava
- UEFA Cup: Slovan Bratislava; Sigma Olomouc
- Top goalscorer: Roman Kukleta (17 goals)

Statistics of Czechoslovak First League in the 1990–91 season. Roman Kukleta was the league's top scorer with 17 goals.

== Overview ==
It was contested by 16 teams, and Sparta Prague won the championship.

== Stadia and locations ==
Location of clubs in the 1990–91 Czechoslovak First League

== League standings ==
Pos	Team	Pld	W	D	L	GF	GA	GD	Pts	Qualification or relegation
1	Sparta Prague (C)	30	15	9	6	58	28	+30	39	Qualification for European Cup first round
2	Slovan Bratislava	30	16	6	8	47	27	+20	38	Qualification for UEFA Cup first round
3	Sigma Olomouc	30	16	5	9	52	34	+18	37	Qualification for UEFA Cup first round
4	DAC Dunajská Streda	30	12	11	7	39	36	+3	35	
5	Baník Ostrava	30	14	4	12	50	34	+16	32	Qualification for Cup Winners' Cup first round
6	Union Cheb	30	13	6	11	44	36	+8	32	
7	Inter Bratislava	30	10	10	10	41	42	−1	30	
8	Dukla Banská Bystrica	30	11	8	11	35	37	−2	30	
9	Slavia Prague	30	10	10	10	44	48	−4	30	
10	Tatran Prešov	30	10	9	11	42	39	+3	29	
11	Dukla Prague	30	12	5	13	38	52	−14	29	
12	Vítkovice	30	12	4	14	47	52	−5	28	
13	Bohemians Prague	30	10	7	13	35	50	−15	27	
14	Spartak Hradec Králové	30	10	7	13	33	52	−19	27	
15	Nitra (R)	30	9	7	14	30	35	−5	25	Relegation to Slovak National Football League
16	Zbrojovka Brno (R)	30	2	8	20	19	52	−33	12	Relegation to Czech-Moravian Football League

Source: rsssf.com
(C) Champions; (R) Relegated

== Results ==
Home \ Away	OST	BOH	DAC	BB	DUK	HRK	INT	NIT	OLO	SLA	SLO	SPA	PRE	CHE	VÍT	BRN
Baník Ostrava		4–0	4–0	2–1	2–0	2–1	0–1	1–0	1–3	3–4	3–1	2–1	0–0	5–0	0–1	2–0
Bohemians Prague	3–2		2–2	1–0	2–2	4–1	2–2	2–1	1–2	1–1	2–0	0–0	3–2	2–1	2–1	1–1
DAC Dunajská Streda	1–5	1–0		2–0	2–1	2–1	1–3	0–1	2–1	0–0	2–0	0–0	2–1	4–2	1–0	4–0
Dukla Banská Bystrica	2–1	2–0	1–1		1–2	4–1	1–1	0–0	1–0	1–2	0–0	0–2	3–2	1–1	3–0	3–0
Dukla Prague	1–0	0–4	2–0	2–3		3–3	4–2	1–0	2–0	0–0	1–0	1–3	1–0	2–1	1–1	1–1
Hradec Králové	0–2	2–0	1–1	0–0	0–1		2–1	3–1	2–1	2–1	0–0	3–0	0–0	0–0	3–2	2–1
Inter Bratislava	1–1	1–0	1–1	2–1	4–0	0–1		3–3	3–2	4–1	0–0	1–0	1–1	1–1	2–0	1–0
Nitra	0–0	0–0	0–2	0–1	2–1	1–1	3–0		0–0	3–0	0–1	1–0	3–0	0–3	3–2	4–0
Sigma Olomouc	1–0	3–0	2–1	2–1	4–0	2–0	3–2	3–0		2–2	1–1	1–0	2–0	1–2	3–1	0–0
Slavia Prague	4–1	1–0	0–1	1–1	0–3	4–1	2–1	1–1	1–1		2–1	3–3	2–2	2–1	3–1	3–0
Slovan Bratislava	2–1	4–0	2–0	4–0	1–0	0–1	4–0	1–0	3–1	4–1		0–3	1–0	2–0	3–0	4–2
Sparta Prague	0–0	5–0	1–1	3–0	5–1	4–1	3–0	3–1	1–0	3–1	0–0		2–2	3–1	3–0	3–3
Tatran Prešov	0–1	3–0	2–2	1–1	4–2	5–0	2–1	3–1	1–3	3–2	1–0	0–0		3–1	2–1	2–0
Union Cheb	2–1	3–0	0–0	3–0	4–0	2–0	0–0	1–0	2–3	0–0	2–3	0–2	3–0		2–0	2–1
Vítkovice	4–3	2–1	2–2	1–2	3–1	4–0	3–2	2–0	4–1	1–0	3–3	5–4	1–0	0–2		2–0
Zbrojovka Brno	0–1	1–2	1–1	0–1	0–2	4–1	0–0	0–1	0–4	3–0	1–2	0–1	0–0	0–2	0–0	

Source: statistiky1ligy.fotbal.cz
Legend: Blue = home team win; Yellow = draw; Red = away team win.

== Attendances ==
#	Club	Average	Highest
1	Slovan	8,581	18,476
2	Sigma Olomouc	6,212	11,345
3	Sparta Praha	5,850	12,710
4	DAC	5,536	7,435
5	Hradec Králové	5,113	10,350
6	Tatran Prešov	4,809	8,260
7	Ostrava	3,733	7,944
8	Nitra	3,715	5,811
9	Bohemians	3,422	7,316
10	Dukla Banská Bystrica	3,247	6,238
11	Cheb	3,148	6,379
12	Slavia Praha	3,129	5,225
13	Brno	3,123	6,024
14	Inter Bratislava	2,467	10,409
15	Vítkovice	2,174	3,201
16	Dukla Praha	1,202	4,856

== Top scorers ==
The top goalscorers in the 1990–91 Czechoslovak First League were as follows:

Rank	Player	Club	Goals
1	(Czechoslovakia) Roman Kukleta	Sparta Prague	17
2	(Czechoslovakia) Alexander Vencel (Czechoslovakia) Jiří Krbeček (Czechoslovakia) Štefan Rusnák (Czechoslovakia) Pavol Vytykač (Czechoslovakia) Jiří Bartl	ŠK Slovan Bratislava; SKP Union Cheb; Dukla Banská Bystrica; TJ Tatran Prešov; TJ Vítkovice	14
7	(Czechoslovakia) Pavel Kuka	Slavia Prague	13
