= Jan Baránek =

Czech soccer player and soccer coach

Personal information
- Date of birth: 1 July 1970 (age 56)
- Place of birth: Uherské Hradiště, Czechoslovakia
- Height: 1.85 m (6 ft 1 in)
- Position: Midfielder

Senior career*
Years	Team	Apps	(Gls)
1990–1993	FC Vítkovice	88	(20)
1993–1996	Petra Drnovice	67	(9)
1996–1998	Kaučuk Opava	56	(3)
1998–2000	Baník Ostrava	39	(1)
1998–1999	Opava	15	(6)
2000–2005	Opava	130	(16)
2005–2007	Jakubčovice	28	(7)

Managerial career
- 2007–2010: Jakubčovice
- 2010–2013: FC Baník Ostrava (youth)
- 2013–2016: Opava
- 2018–2020: Mladá Boleslav (assistant)
- 2021–: Karviná (assistant)
- * Club domestic league appearances and goals

Jan Baránek (born 1 July 1970) is a Czech former football player. He made more than 300 appearances in the top flight of Czechoslovak and later Czech football. He was captain at Opava.

In 2007, he was manager of Jakubčovice Fotbal. His brother Vít Baránek and son Jan Baránek, Jr. are also professional football players.

== Honours ==
=== Managerial ===
SFC Opava

- Moravian-Silesian Football League: 2013–14
