= Ondřej Smetana (footballer) =

Czech footballer (born 1982)

Personal information
- Date of birth: 4 September 1982 (age 44)
- Place of birth: Ostrava-Vítkovice, Czechoslovakia
- Height: 1.98 m (6 ft 6 in)
- Position: Striker

Team information
- Current team: Opava (manager)

Youth career
- 1989–2001: Vítkovice

Senior career*
Years	Team	Apps	(Gls)
2001–2005	Vítkovice	60	(9)
2002	→ Baník Ratíškovice (loan)	10	(1)
2006–2007	Fotbal Fulnek	15	(7)
2008–2011	Slovan Liberec	41	(5)
2009	→ Slovácko (loan)	11	(2)
2010–2011	→ Senica (loan)	29	(18)
2011–2013	Sint-Truiden	7	(0)
2012	→ Slovan Bratislava (loan)	14	(5)
2012–2013	→ Hansa Rostock (loan)	25	(8)
2013–2014	Enosis Neon Paralimni	3	(0)
2014	SV Elversberg	3	(0)
2014–2015	Fotbal Třinec	21	(2)
2015	Union Neuhofen/Ybbs	10	(4)

Managerial career
- 2016–2017: Vítkovice (youth)
- 2018: Odra Petřkovice
- 2019–2020: Odra Petřkovice
- 2020: Vítkovice
- 2020–2021: Baník Ostrava B
- 2021–2022: Baník Ostrava
- 2022–2023: Vysočina Jihlava
- 2023: Hlučín
- 2023–2024: Ružomberok
- 2024–2025: Slovácko
- 2025: Ružomberok
- 2026: Baník Ostrava
- 2026–: Opava
- * Club domestic league appearances and goals

Ondřej Smetana (born 4 September 1982) is a Czech football coach and former player. Smetana started his football career in his native Ostrava at FC Vítkovice. He eventually appeared in several other Czech 2. Liga clubs before moving to Czech First League's Slovan Liberec. He signed a contract with Belgian side Sint-Truiden for the 2011–12 season.

== Playing career ==
Smetana spent the first nine years of his professional career in various clubs in the first three leagues in the Czech Republic, before moving to Belgium and finally Germany from 2010 via Slovakia. There, he signed a one-year contract with 3. Liga club Hansa Rostock in June 2012, initially on loan from Belgian Sint-Truiden; a purchase option was also agreed. Smetana then played for Hansa Rostock in 25 games in which he scored a total of eight goals. In addition, he was voted the 3. Liga player of the month in September and October 2012 and ultimately took the second place in the 3. Liga player of the year election. After a brief stint in the first division of Cyprus, 3. Liga club SV Elversberg signed him for the second half of the season. This was followed by a season at Fotbal Třinec and in summer 2015 the move to Union Neuhofen / Ybbs in Austria.

== Coaching career ==
Smetana started his coaching career at MFK Vítkovice as a youth coach.

In December 2017 it was confirmed, that Smetana would take charge of FC Odra Petřkovice from 1 January 2018. However, he decided to resign on 10 September 2018. He took charge of the team once again at the beginning of the 2019–20 season. He left the club in January 2020, to take up a head coach role at his former club MFK Vítkovice. However, Smetana wasn't able to save the club from relegation to the Moravian–Silesian Football League and left the club by the end of the season.

On 18 August 2020, Smetana was appointed as the head coach of FC Baník Ostrava's B-team playing in the Moravian–Silesian Football League. In February 2021 he was appointed as the head coach of Baník's A-team following the sacking of Luboš Kozel. In October 2022 Smetana was appointed as the head coach of FC Vysočina Jihlava playing in the Czech National Football League.

On 14 November 2024, Smatana was appointed as the head coach of Slovácko, signing a contract until summer 2027.

On 8 April 2025, Smetana was appointed as the head coach of Ružomberok.

On 16 February 2026, Smetana was appointed as the head coach of Baník Ostrava again.

On 21 September 2026, Smetana was appointed as the head coach of Opava.
