= Helešic =

Helešic (feminine Helešicová) is a Czech surname. Notable people with the surname include:

- Lukáš Helešic (born 1996), Czech rower
- Matěj Helešic (born 1996), Czech footballer
