= Radek Kuděla =

Czech footballer

Personal information
- Full name: Radek Kuděla
- Date of birth: 3 January 1985 (age 41)
- Place of birth: Vítkov, Czechoslovakia
- Height: 1.88 m (6 ft 2 in)
- Position: Centre back

Team information
- Current team: FK Fotbal Třinec
- Number: 5

Youth career
- Hradec nad Moravicí
- 1998–2003: SFC Opava

Senior career*
Years	Team	Apps	(Gls)
2004–2005	SFC Opava	2	(0)
2005–2007	Jakubčovice Fotbal	52	(0)
2007–2009	Dukla Prague	25	(1)
2009–2012	Fotbal Třinec	83	(1)
- * Club domestic league appearances and goals as of 30 June 2012

Radek Kuděla (born 3 January 1985) is a Czech footballer who currently plays for Czech club FK Fotbal Třinec as a defender.

== Career ==
Born in Vítkov in the Opava district he is a product of the SFC Opava youth system. He broke into the senior side in 2004/05 season making two starts in the Gambrinus Liga. Following the clubs drop of two divisions due to internal issues he moved to Czech 3rd tier side Jakubčovice Fotbal. His first season saw the club's promotion into the 2nd division.

The second season saw the newly promoted Jakubčovice finish in 11th position. They sold their right to play in the division to FK Dukla Prague where the defender duly moved. After a one and a half year spell with Dukla Prague in the second division he moved to another 2nd division outfit FK Fotbal Třinec in 2009. He made 68 appearances for the club and scored a goal.
