= Keler =

Keler or Kéler may refer to:

- Keler (beer), a variety of the Estrella Damm lager, brewed in Barcelona, Spain
- Béla Kéler (1820–1882), a Hungarian composer and conductor
- Bohuš Keler (born 1961), a Czech football manager and former player
- KELER Group (for Központi ELszámolóház és ÉRtéktár), a financial market infrastructure in Hungary
