= Veverka =

Veverka (feminine: Veverková) is a Czech surname meaning "squirrel". Notable people with the surname include:

- Joseph Veverka (born 1941), American astronomer
- Richard Veverka (born 1987), Czech footballer
- Vilém Veverka (born 1978), Czech oboist

== See also ==
- 2710 Veverka, main-belt asteroid
