= 2009–10 Czech 2. Liga =

2. česká fotbalová liga
- Season: 2009–10
- Champions: Hradec Králové
- Promoted: Hradec Králové; Ústí nad Labem
- Relegated: Opava; Vítkovice
- Matches played: 240
- Goals scored: 623 (2.6 per match)
- Top goalscorer: Pavel Černý (14); Dani Chigou (14); Karel Kroupa (14)
- Biggest home win: Hradec Králové 5–0 Sokolov
- Biggest away win: Hlučín 0–4 Třinec; Viktoria Žižkov 0–4 Vlašim; Viktoria Žižkov 1–5 Jihlava
- Highest scoring: Jihlava 5–3 Karviná
- Average attendance: 1,132

The 2009–10 Czech 2. Liga was the 17th season of the 2. česká fotbalová liga, the second tier of the Czech football league. The season began on 31 August 2009 and ended on 5 June 2010. There was a winter break between 17 November 2009 and 4 March 2010.

== Team changes ==
=== From 2. Liga ===
Promoted to Czech First League

- Bohemians 1905
- 1. FC Slovácko

Relegated to Moravian-Silesian Football League

- HFK Olomouc
- Fotbal Fulnek

=== To 2. Liga ===
Relegated from Czech First League

- FC Tescoma Zlín
- FK Viktoria Žižkov

Promoted from Bohemian Football League

- Vlašim

Promoted from Moravian-Silesian Football League

- FC Hlučín

== League table ==
Pos	Team	Pld	W	D	L	GF	GA	GD	Pts	Promotion or relegation
1	Hradec Králové (C, P)	30	20	8	2	47	18	+29	68	Promotion to 2010–11 1. Liga
2	Ústí nad Labem (P)	30	20	5	5	52	27	+25	65	Promotion to 2010–11 1. Liga
3	Tescoma Zlín	30	17	5	8	49	33	+16	56	
4	Jihlava	30	15	7	8	57	37	+20	52	
5	Viktoria Žižkov	30	13	7	10	42	41	+1	46	
6	Dukla Prague	30	12	8	10	45	41	+4	44	
7	Vlašim	30	11	7	12	40	41	−1	40	
8	Karviná	30	11	6	13	44	36	+8	39	
9	Třinec	30	10	8	12	34	38	−4	38	
10	Sokolov	30	9	10	11	37	43	−6	37	
11	Most	30	8	12	10	35	38	−3	36	
12	Sparta Prague B	30	6	11	13	33	50	−17	29 (Note: SPA: 12 pts; HLU: 8 pts > GD 6-4; CAS: 8 pts > GD 7-10; OPA: 3 pts)	
13	Hlučín	30	6	11	13	27	43	−16	29	
14	Čáslav	30	7	8	15	28	49	−21	29	
15	Opava (R)	30	6	11	13	30	37	−7	29	Relegation to 2010–11 MSFL
16	Vítkovice (R)	30	4	6	20	23	51	−28	18	Relegation to 2010–11 MSFL

Source: The Football Association of the Czech Republic
Rules for classification: 1) points; 2) head-to-head points; 3) head-to-head goal difference; 4) head-to-head goals scored; 5) goal difference; 6) number of goals scored.
(C) Champions; (P) Promoted; (R) Relegated

== Top goalscorers ==
Rank	Scorer	Club	Goals
1	(Czech Republic) Pavel Černý	Hradec Králové	14
1	(Cameroon) Dani Chigou	Dukla Prague	14
1	(Czech Republic) Karel Kroupa	Tescoma Zlín	14
4	(Czech Republic) Vladimír Bálek	Vlašim	13
4	(Czech Republic) Martin Opic	Karviná	13
6	(Czech Republic) Richard Kalod	Viktoria Žižkov	12
6	(Bosnia and Herzegovina) Muris Mešanović	Jihlava	12
8	(Czech Republic) Vladimír Mišinský	Karviná	11
8	(Czech Republic) Richard Veverka	Ústí nad Labem	11
8	(Czech Republic) Libor Žůrek	Zlín	11

== See also ==
- 2009–10 Czech First League
- 2009–10 Czech Cup
