= Jan Baránek Jr. =

Czech footballer (born 1993)

Jan Baránek
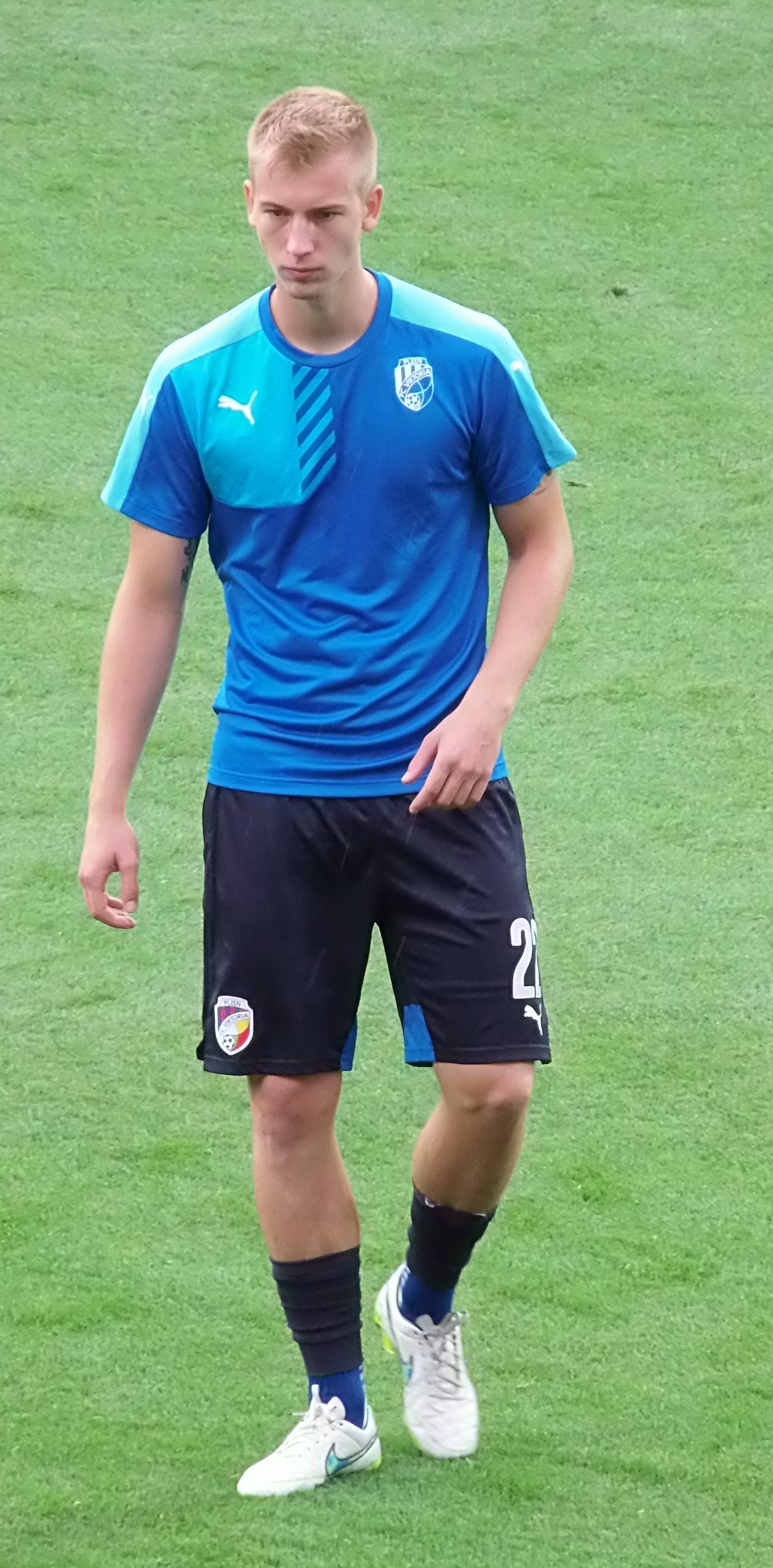
- Baránek in 2015

Personal information
- Date of birth: 26 June 1993 (age 33)
- Place of birth: Opava, Czech Republic
- Height: 1.92 m (6 ft 4 in)
- Position: Defender

Team information
- Current team: Zbrojovka Brno (assistant)

Senior career*
Years	Team	Apps	(Gls)
2012–2015	Baník Ostrava	38	(3)
2015–2018	Viktoria Plzeň	39	(5)
Total		77	(8)

International career
2013	Czech Republic U20	1	(0)
2013–2015	Czech Republic U21	9	(0)

Managerial career
- 2023–2025: Czech Republic U21 (assistant)
- 2025–: Zbrojovka Brno (assistant)
- * Club domestic league appearances and goals

Jan Baránek Jr. (born 26 June 1993) is a Czech professional footballer who played as a defender for Baník Ostrava and FC Viktoria Plzeň in the Czech First League. His father is former football midfielder Jan Baránek and his uncle is Vít Baránek.

Baránek has played international football at under-21 level for Czech Republic U21.

A string of serious knee injuries prevented him from playing any competitive matches for 18 months between July 2016 and January 2018. In February 2018, unable to fully recover from his injuries, he retired from professional football at the age of 24.
