= Alois Grussmann =

Czech football manager and former player (born 1964)

Personal information
- Full name: Alois Grussmann
- Date of birth: 6 September 1964 (age 62)
- Place of birth: Opava, Czechoslovakia
- Position: Forward

Youth career
- Sokol Hrabůvka

Senior career*
| Years | Team | Apps | (Gls) |
| 1984–1985 | Baník Ostrava | 1 | (0) |
| 1986–1991 | Vítkovice | 148 | (30) |
| 1991–1992 | Real Betis | 38 | (8) |
| 1992 | Baník Ostrava | 4 | (0) |
| 1992 | Vítkovice | 8 | (0) |
| 1993 | Sigma Olomouc | 12 | (3) |
| 1995–2000 | Opava | 131 | (33) |
| 2000–2001 | Třinec | 12 | (0) |

International career
| 1988–1991 | Czechoslovakia | 6 | (1) |

Managerial career
- 2003–2006: Jakubčovice
- 2007–2008: Vítkovice
- 2012: Fotbal Třinec
- 2019: SFC Opava (caretaker)
- * Club domestic league appearances and goals

Alois Grussmann (born 6 September 1964) is a Czech football manager and former player who played as a forward. He played in the Czechoslovak First League with Baník Ostrava and Vítkovice from 1984 until 1991 before spending one year in Spain with Real Betis. Returning to his homeland Grussmann played mainly for Opava, where he played five seasons in the Czech First League. Grussmann represented Czechoslovakia at international level, earning six appearances and scoring one goal between 1988 and 1991.

== Club career ==
Grussmann started to play his club football in Czechoslovakia for Baník Ostrava. In 1986, he joined Vítkovice, with whom he stayed for five seasons, playing 148 Czechoslovak First League matches and scoring 30 goals. During this time, he played in the European Cup and UEFA Cup.

In 1991, Grussmann moved to Spain to play for Real Betis, where he joined compatriots Michal Bílek and Roman Kukleta. He scored eight goals in 38 league appearances for the Spanish club. Grussmann later returned to his homeland, playing briefly for his former clubs Baník Ostrava and Vítkovice as well as Sigma Olomouc in the final season of the Czechoslovak First League. Following the establishment of the Czech First League, Grussmann played there for five seasons, all for Opava, with his best goal return occurring in the 1996–97 season when he scored 13 times. Grussmann finished his career with 304 appearances and 68 goals from top-league Czechoslovak and Czech football. He later played in the second league for Třinec.

== International career ==
Having played for Czech junior national teams, Grussmann debuted for the senior squad in April 1988 in a friendly match against USSR. He scored his only senior international goal in a 2–0 friendly victory against Australia in February 1991. Grussmann took part in three UEFA Euro 1992 qualifying matches in 1991, after which he did not represent his country again.

== Managerial career ==
Grussmann led Jakubčovice until November 2006. He was named as Vítkovice's manager in December 2006. He remained at the club until August 2008, when he left his position following four successive losses at the beginning of the 2008–09 season.

== Personal life ==
Grussmann is married with two sons named Marek and Radim.
