= 2006–07 Czech 2. Liga =

2. česká fotbalová liga
- Season: 2006–07
- Champions: Viktoria Žižkov
- Promoted: Viktoria Žižkov; Bohemians 1905
- Relegated: Sigma Olomouc "B"; Dosta Bystrc; Jakubčovice; Blšany
- Matches played: 240
- Goals scored: 577 (2.4 per match)
- Top goalscorer: Petr Faldyna (15)
- Average attendance: 1,467

The 2006–07 Czech 2. Liga was the 14th season of the 2. česká fotbalová liga, the second tier of the Czech football league.

== Team changes ==
=== From 2. Liga ===
Promoted to Czech First League

- SK Kladno
- SK Dynamo České Budějovice

Relegated to Moravian-Silesian Football League

- Brno "B"

Relegated to Bohemian Football League

- Sparta Prague "B"

Relegated to Divize E

- Slavia Kroměříž (Note: Opava bought a license to play in the 2006–07 2. Liga from Slavia Kroměříž, who had competed in the league the previous season.)

Relegated to 5. Liga (Pardubický kraj)

- Pardubice (Note: Sokolov bought a license to play in the 2006–07 2. Liga from FK Pardubice, who had competed in the league the previous season.)

Relegated

- Kunovice
- Xaverov (Note: Bohemians 1905 bought a license to play in the 2006–07 2. Liga from Xaverov, who had competed in the league the previous season.)

Folded

- FKD

=== To 2. Liga ===
Relegated from Czech First League

- FC Vysočina Jihlava
- FK Chmel Blšany

Promoted from Bohemian Football League

- Čáslav
- Bohemians 1905 (Note: Bohemians 1905 bought a license to play in the 2006–07 2. Liga from Xaverov, who had competed in the league the previous season.)

Promoted from Moravian-Silesian Football League

- Jakubčovice
- Dosta Bystrc
- Třinec

Promoted from Divize B

- Sokolov (Note: Sokolov bought a license to play in the 2006–07 2. Liga from FK Pardubice, who had competed in the league the previous season.)

Promoted from 5. Liga (Moravskoslezský kraj)

- Opava (Note: Opava bought a license to play in the 2006–07 2. Liga from Slavia Kroměříž, who had competed in the league the previous season.)

== League standings ==
Pos	Team	Pld	W	D	L	GF	GA	GD	Pts	Promotion or relegation
1	Viktoria Žižkov (C, P)	30	19	7	4	55	23	+32	64	Promotion to 2007–08 1. Liga
2	Bohemians 1905 (P)	30	18	6	6	47	21	+26	60	Promotion to 2007–08 1. Liga
3	HFK Olomouc	30	16	5	9	40	28	+12	53 (Note: OLO 3–0 OPA; OPA 2–1 OLO)	
4	Opava	30	15	8	7	47	28	+19	53	
5	Jihlava	30	14	9	7	49	26	+23	51	
6	Sokolov	30	12	10	8	36	33	+3	46	
7	Hradec Králové	30	11	10	9	41	34	+7	43	
8	Blšany (R)	30	11	5	14	27	33	−6	38	Relegation to 2007–08 ČFL
9	Ústí nad Labem	30	10	7	13	41	44	−3	37 (Note: UST: 10 pts; CAS: 6 pts; JAK: 1 pt)	
10	Čáslav	30	11	4	15	34	48	−14	37	
11	Jakubčovice (R)	30	10	7	13	35	44	−9	37	Relegation to 2007–08 1.A třída (Note: Jakubčovice sold their license to play in the league for the next season to Dukla Prague and thus played in the sixth level of league competition (1.A třída) the following season.)
12	Vítkovice	30	8	8	14	31	50	−19	32 (Note: VIT 2–1 TRI; TRI 0–0 VIT)	
13	Třinec	30	10	2	18	21	42	−21	32	
14	Hlučín	30	6	11	13	24	34	−10	29 (Note: HLU 2–2 SIG; SIG 0–0 HLU)	
15	Sigma Olomouc B (R)	30	8	5	17	27	43	−16	29	Relegation to 2007–08 MSFL
16	Dosta Bystrc (R)	30	7	4	19	22	46	−24	25	Relegation to 2007–08 MSFL

Source: The Football Association of the Czech Republic
Rules for classification: 1) points; 2) head-to-head points; 3) head-to-head goal difference; 4) head-to-head goals scored; 5) goal difference; 6) number of goals scored.
(C) Champions; (P) Promoted; (R) Relegated

== Top goalscorers ==
Rank	Scorer	Club	Goals
1	(Czech Republic) Petr Faldyna	Jihlava	15
2	(Czech Republic) Petr Fousek	Ústí nad Labem	9
2	(Czech Republic) Ivo Svoboda	Jihlava	9
2	(Czech Republic) Petr Švancara	Viktoria Žižkov	9
5	(Czech Republic) Vladimír Bálek	Bohemians 1905	8
5	(Czech Republic) Miroslav Černý	Vítkovice	8
5	(Czech Republic) Martin Hanus	Hlučín	8
5	(Czech Republic) Libor Kozák	Opava	8
5	(Czech Republic) Jan Novotný	Viktoria Žižkov	8
5	(Czech Republic) Michal Salák	Sokolov	8
5	(Czech Republic) Dalibor Slezák	Bohemians 1905	8

== See also ==
- 2006–07 Czech First League
- 2006–07 Czech Cup
