= Kudela =

Kudela, Kúdela or Kuděla (Czech feminine: Kúdelová or Kudělová) is a surname. Notable people with the surname include:

- Ondřej Kúdela (born 1987), Czech footballer
- Radek Kuděla (born 1985), Czech footballer
- Jola Kudela (born 1970), Polish artist and filmmaker
