= Vilém Fendrich =

Czech footballer (born 1991)

Personal information
- Date of birth: 22 January 1991 (age 35)
- Place of birth: Czechoslovakia
- Height: 1.93 m (6 ft 4 in)
- Position: Goalkeeper

Team information
- Current team: České Budějovice (on loan from FK Jablonec)
- Number: 1

Senior career*
| Years | Team | Apps | (Gls) |
| 2011–2015 | Jablonec | 0 | (0) |
| 2012 | → Ústí nad Labem (loan) | 2 | (0) |
| 2013–2014 | → Varnsdorf (loan) | 12 | (0) |
| 2014–2015 | → Vlašim (loan) | 12 | (0) |
| 2016 | Viktorie Jirny | | |
| 2016–2021 | Opava | 102 | (0) |
| 2021–2022 | Hradec Králové | 24 | (0) |
| 2022–2023 | Sigma Olomouc B | 3 | (0) |
| 2023– | Jablonec | 5 | (0) |
| 2024– | → České Budějovice (loan) | 10 | (0) |
- * Club domestic league appearances and goals as of 4 January 2025

Vilém Fendrich (born 22 January 1991) is a Czech footballer who plays as a goalkeeper for České Budějovice on loan from FK Jablonec.

== Career ==
In 2016, Fendrich signed for Czech side Viktorie Jirny. He helped the club win the league. In 2016, he signed for Opava. He was regarded as one of the club's most important players. He helped the club achieve promotion.

On 2 August 2024, Fendrich joined České Budějovice on a one-year loan deal.
