= Vladimír Bálek =

Czech footballer (born 1981)

Personal information
- Date of birth: 8 March 1981 (age 45)
- Place of birth: Czechoslovakia
- Height: 1.89 m (6 ft 2 1/2 in)
- Position: Forward

Team information
- Current team: SV Sierning
- Number: 9

Youth career
- 1988–1993: Horní Měcholupy
- 1994–2001: Slavia Prague

Senior career*
Years	Team	Apps	(Gls)
2002–2006	Slavia Prague	2	(0)
2003	→ SFC Opava (loan)	5	(0)
2004–2005	→ SC Xaverov (loan)		(0)
2005–2006	→ SC Xaverov (loan)		(0)
2006	→ Čáslav (loan)		(0)
2007–2013	Bohemians 1905	67	(7)
2009	→ Králův Dvůr (loan)		(0)
2009	→ Vlašim (loan)	16	(13)
2010–2011	→ Vlašim (loan)	18	(3)
2012–2013	→ Viktoria Žižkov (loan)	9	(1)
2013–	SV Sierning		
- * Club domestic league appearances and goals as of 26 July 2013

Vladimír Bálek (born 8 March 1981) is a professional Czech football player who currently plays for SV Sierning in the Austrian Fourth Division.

Bálek returned to Bohemians after being the top scorer in the first half of the 2009–10 Czech 2. Liga, notching 13 goals in 16 appearances while playing for Vlašim.
