= Bohuš Keler =

Czech football manager and former player (born 1961)

Personal information
- Full name: Bohuš Keler
- Date of birth: 8 September 1961 (age 65)
- Place of birth: Karviná, Czechoslovakia
- Position: Midfielder

Youth career
- 1970–1979: NHKG Karviná
- 1979–1981: Baník Ostrava

Senior career*
| Years | Team | Apps | (Gls) |
| 1981–1983 | TJ ŽD Bohumín | | |
| 1983–1985 | VTJ Tábor | | |
| 1985–1990 | FC Vítkovice | 113 | (11) |
| 1990–1991 | Le Havre AC | | |
| 1991–1993 | AS Angoulême | | |
| 1993–1994 | FC Vítkovice | 17 | (2) |
| 1994–1995 | ČSA Karviná | | |
| 1995–1997 | FK Krnov | | |

Managerial career
- 1995–1997: FK Krnov
- 1997–1999: FC MSA Dolní Benešov
- 2000–2001: SFC Opava
- 2002: FC MSA Dolní Benešov
- 2002: 1. HFK Olomouc
- 2003: FC Vítkovice
- 2004–2007: FC MSA Dolní Benešov
- 2007–2011: SK Čeladná
- 2011–: MFK Havířov
- 2015–: Tj Řepiště
- * Club domestic league appearances and goals

Bohuslav "Bohuš" Keler (born 8 September 1961 in Karviná) is a Czech football manager and former player who played during most of his career for FC Vítkovice.

== Club career ==
Keler played in 113 Czechoslovak First League matches for FC Vítkovice. In the 1985/1986 season he won the Czechoslovak First League with Vítkovice. Keler also had a spell with Le Havre AC in French Ligue 2. Keler scored twice in 17 matches during the inaugural season of the Gambrinus liga, where he played for FC Vítkovice.

== Management career ==
In 2011, he was announced as the new coach of MFK Havířov.
