= Vladimír Mišinský =

Czech footballer

Personal information
- Date of birth: 8 July 1986 (age 40)
- Place of birth: Czechoslovakia
- Height: 1.85 m (6 ft 1 in)
- Position: Midfielder

Team information
- Current team: Odra Petřkovice
- Number: 11

Youth career
- 1994–2005: Baník Ostrava

Senior career*
Years	Team	Apps	(Gls)
2005–2007	Baník Ostrava	29	(0)
2006	→ Hlučín (loan)		
2008	Frýdek-Místek		
2009–2013	Karviná	108	(38)
2011	→ Hradec Králové (loan)	8	(0)
2015–2019	Vítkovice	69	(17)
2019–	Odra Petřkovice	12	(1)

International career^{‡}
2001–2002	Czech Republic U16	3	(0)
2007	Czech Republic U21	1	(0)
- * Club domestic league appearances and goals as of 5 June 2011 ‡ National team caps and goals as of 22 December 2014

Vladimír Mišinský (born 8 July 1986) is a Czech football player who plays for FC Odra Petřkovice.

== Career ==
Mišinský started his career at Baník Ostrava. Ahead of the 2019–20 season, Mišinský joined FC Odra Petřkovice.
