= Jiří Bartl =

Czech footballer and manager

Personal information
- Date of birth: 22 October 1963 (age 63)
- Place of birth: Czechoslovakia
- Position: Midfielder

Senior career*
Years	Team	Apps	(Gls)
1985–1991	TJ Vítkovice	167	(39)
1992–1993	Baník Ostrava		
1993–1994	Fotbal Třinec		
1994–1997	Kaučuk Opava	37	(12)

Managerial career
- 1998–2000: SFC Opava
- 2007: FK Teplice
- 2010–2011: Hlučín
- * Club domestic league appearances and goals

Jiří Bartl (born 22 October 1963) is a Czech former football player and manager. A midfielder, Bartl was part of TJ Vítkovice for their league championship in the 1985–86 Czechoslovak First League.

== Playing career ==
Bartl made 204 appearances and scored 51 goals across the end of the Czechoslovak First League and into the Czech First League, playing for TJ Vítkovice and FC Baník Ostrava in the former league, before playing for SFC Opava in the Czech top flight in between 1995 and 1997. He was part of the title-winning Vítkovice side in the 1985–86 Czechoslovak First League.

== Managerial career ==
Having previously been manager of SFC Opava and assistant manager, Bartl took over as manager at Gambrinus liga side Teplice in January 2007 following the illness of manager Vlastislav Mareček. At the end of the 2006–07 season, he was dismissed from his position.

Bartl was announced as the new manager of Hlučín in September 2010. However the club experienced a difficult season, finishing last in the 2010–11 Czech 2. Liga, and he was sacked in June 2011.
