= Vít Baránek =

Czech footballer

Personal information
- Date of birth: 27 September 1974 (age 52)
- Place of birth: Opava, Czechoslovakia
- Height: 1.90 m (6 ft 3 in)
- Position: Goalkeeper

Youth career
- 1982–1990: MSA Dolní Benešov
- 1990–1993: FC Baník Ostrava
- 1993–1994: VTJ Kroměříž

Senior career*
Years	Team	Apps	(Gls)
1994–2001	FC Baník Ostrava	70	(0)
2001–2003	SFC Opava (loan)	23	(0)
2003	FC Košice	14	(0)
2003–2009	FC Tescoma Zlín	112	(0)
2009–2012	FC Baník Ostrava	37	(0)
Total		257	(0)
- * Club domestic league appearances and goals as of 14 December 2016

Vít Baránek (born 27 September 1974) is a Czech former football goalkeeper. He is the brother of Jan Baránek. He made 182 appearances in the Czech First League for Baník Ostrava, Opava, and Zlín.
