= FC Dosta Bystrc-Kníničky =

Dosta Bystrc
- Full name: FC Dosta Bystrc-Kníničky
- Founded: 1932
- Ground: Stadion pod Pekařkou
- Capacity: 2,500
- Chairman: Ing. František Čechura
- Manager: Oldřich Janusicza
- League: Regional Championship (South Moravia)
- 2019–20: 9th (season abandoned due to COVID-19)
Home colours	Away colours

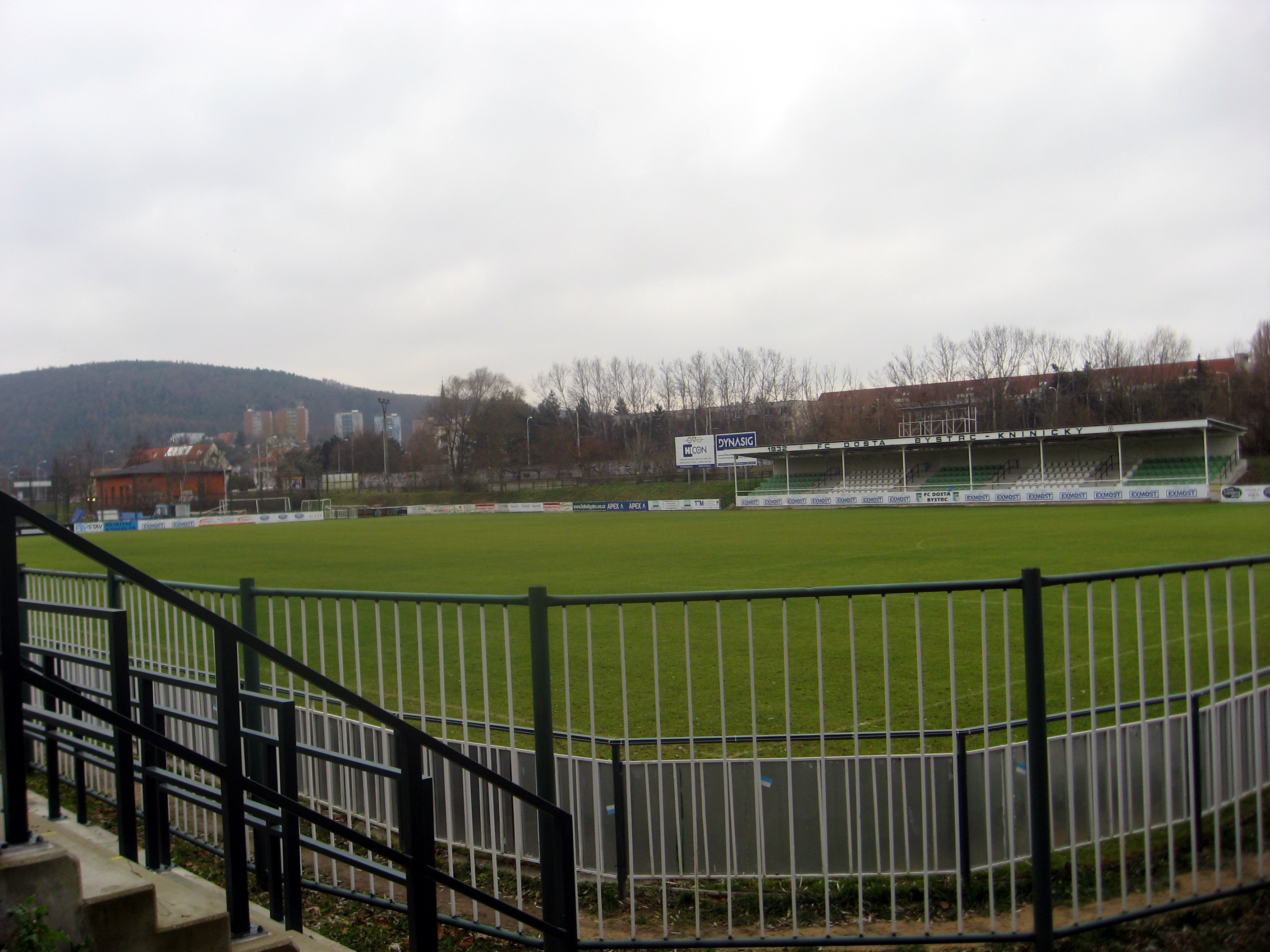
Football stadium of the club

FC Dosta Bystrc-Kníničky is a football club from the district of Bystrc in Brno, Czech Republic. Currently the club plays in the Regional Championship (South Moravia), the fifth tier of Czech competitive football.

The team played in the Czech 2. Liga in the 2006–2007 season.

== Historical names ==
=== Historical names of Bystrc football team ===
Sources:

- 1932 – SK Bystrc (Sportovní klub (Sports club) Bystrc)
- 1948 – Sokol Bystrc
- 1950 – fusion with Kovomat Brno => TJ Sokol Kovomat Bystrc (Tělovýchovná jednota (Physical education unity) Sokol Kovomat Bystrc)
- 1953 – fusion with Dynamo Energetika Brno => DSO Dynamo Energetika Bystrc (Dobrovolná sportovní organisace (Voluntary sports organization) Dynamo Energetika Bystrc)
- 1957 – TJ Sokol Bystrc (Tělovýchovná jednota (Physical education unity) Sokol Bystrc)
- 1961 – fusion of Bystrc and Kníničky football teams

=== Historical names of Kníničky football team ===
Sources:

- 1932 – DSK Kníničky (Dělnický sportovní klub (Workers sports club) Kníničky)
- 1936 – HSK Kníničky (Hasičský sportovní klub (Fire services sports club) Kníničky)
- 1947 – SK Kníničky (Sportovní klub (Sports club) Kníničky)
- 1961 – fusion of Bystrc and Kníničky football teams

=== Historical names after fusion ===
Sources:

- 1961 – TJ Sokol Bystrc-Kníničky (Tělovýchovná jednota (Physical education unity) Sokol Bystrc-Kníničky)
- 1994 – FC Bystrc-Kníničky (Fotbalový klub (Football club) Dosta Bystrc-Kníničky)
- 1994 – FC Dosta Bystrc-Kníničky (Fotbalový klub (Football club) Dopravní stavby Bystrc-Kníničky)

== Season-by-season record ==
Season	Division	Level	Position	Notes
Czechoslovakia (1945–1993)
1945–46	I. B class, BZMŽF – I. district	4	13th	
1946–47	I. B class, BZMŽF – I. district	4	7th	
...
1978–79	I. A class, South Moravia – group A	5	3rd	
1979–80	I. A class, South Moravia – group A	5	6th	
1980–81	I. A class, South Moravia – group A	5	12th	Reorganization
1981–82	I. A class, South Moravia – group A	6	9th	
1982–83	I. A class, South Moravia – group A	6	6th	Reorganization
1983–84	Regional Championship (South Moravia) – group A	5	7th	
1984–85	Regional Championship (South Moravia) – group A	5	3rd	
1985–86	Regional Championship (South Moravia) – group A	5	5th	
1986–87	Regional Championship (South Moravia)	5	14th	Relegated
...
1991–92	Regional Championship (South Moravia)	5	2nd	
1992–93	Regional Championship (South Moravia)	5	3rd	
Czech Republic (1993– )
1993–94	Regional Championship (South Moravia)	5	1st	Promoted
1994–95	Division D	4	4th	
1995–96	Division D	4	7th	
1996–97	Division D	4	6th	
1997–98	Division D	4	5th	
1998–99	Division D	4	10th	
1999–00	Division D	4	8th	
2000–01	Division D	4	11th	
2001–02	Division D	4	4th	
2002–03	Division D	4	1st	Promoted
2003–04	Moravian–Silesian Football League	3	2nd	
2004–05	Moravian–Silesian Football League	3	8th	
2005–06	Moravian–Silesian Football League	3	2nd	Promoted
2006–07	Second League	2	16th	Relegated
2007–08	Moravian–Silesian Football League	3	7th	
2008–09	Moravian–Silesian Football League	3	3rd	
2009–10	Moravian–Silesian Football League	3	15th	Relegated
2010–11	Division D	4	10th	
2011–12	Division D	4	2nd	
2012–13	Division D	4	11th	
2013–14	Division D	4	15th	Relegated
2014–15	Regional Championship (South Moravia)	5	5th	
2015–16	Regional Championship (South Moravia)	5	3rd	
2016–17	Regional Championship (South Moravia)	5	3rd	
2017–18	Regional Championship (South Moravia)	5	4th	Promoted
2018–19	Division D	4	16th	Relegated
2019–20	Regional Championship (South Moravia)	5	9th	Season abandoned
2020–21	Regional Championship (South Moravia)	5		

== FC Dosta Bystrc-Kníničky „B“ (reserve team; season-by-season) ==
Season	Division	Level	Position	Notes
Czechoslovakia (1991–1993)
1991–92	City Championship (Brno)	8	3rd	
1992–93	City Championship (Brno)	8	1st	Promoted
Czech Republic (1993–2008)
1993–94	I. B class, South Moravia – group B	7	1st	Relegated
1994–95	District Championship (Brno-countryside)	8	10th	
1995–96	District Championship (Brno-countryside)	8	2nd	Change of division
1996–97	City Championship (Brno)	8	1st	Promoted
1997–98	I. B class, South Moravia – group B	7	8th	
1998–99	I. B class, South Moravia – group B	7	8th	
1999–00	I. B class, South Moravia – group C	7	13th	Relegated
2000–01	City Championship (Brno)	8	4th	
2001–02	City Championship (Brno)	8	4th	
2002–03	City Championship (Brno)	8	7th	
2003–04	City Championship (Brno)	8	1st	Promoted
2004–05	I. B class, South Moravia – group A	7	5th	
2005–06	I. B class, South Moravia – group A	7	8th	
2006–07	I. B class, South Moravia – group B	7	3rd	
2007–08	I. B class, South Moravia – group A	7	13th	Relegated
