= Roman Kukleta =

Czech footballer (1964–2011)

Personal information
- Date of birth: 22 December 1964
- Place of birth: Brno, Czechoslovakia
- Date of death: 26 October 2011 (aged 46)
- Place of death: Brno, Czech Republic
- Height: 1.78 m (5 ft 10 in)
- Position: Forward

Senior career*
| Years | Team | Apps | (Gls) |
| 1982–1983 | Zbrojovka Brno | 3 | (0) |
| 1983–1985 | RH Cheb | 19 | (1) |
| 1985–1988 | Zbrojovka Brno | 70 | (66) |
| 1988–1991 | Sparta Prague | 84 | (49) |
| 1991–1992 | Real Betis | 28 | (6) |
| 1993–1996 | FC Boby Brno | 46 | (8) |

International career
| 1984 | Czechoslovakia U21 | 8 | (2) |
| 1987 | Czechoslovakia Olympic | 1 | (1) |
| 1991 | Czechoslovakia | 4 | (0) |
- * Club domestic league appearances and goals

Roman Kukleta (22 December 1964 – 26 October 2011) was a Czech footballer who played as a forward. He won three Czechoslovak First League titles with Sparta Prague between 1988 and 1991, during which time he also finished as top scorer of the First League. Other clubs he played for include Zbrojovka Brno, RH Cheb and Real Betis. Kukleta represented Czechoslovakia internationally, winning four caps, all in 1991.

== Club career ==
Kukleta started to play his club football in Czechoslovakia for Zbrojovka Brno and RH Cheb. In 1986, he was awarded the Křišťálovou kopačku award for goal of the year, for his scissors kick in Brno's second division match against Slušovice. In 1988, he joined Sparta Prague, with whom he won the league three times in three seasons, as well as the Czechoslovak Cup in the 1988–89 season. He was the top scorer of the 1990–91 Czechoslovak First League with 17 goals.

In 1991 Kukleta moved to Spain to play for Real Betis, where he joined compatriot manager Jozef Jarabinský, as well as players Michal Bílek and Alois Grussmann. He scored six goals in 28 appearances for the Spanish side. Kukleta later returned to his homeland where he played for Brno for the rest of his professional career. He amassed a total of 159 appearances and 58 goals (counting First League only) in his professional career. Kukleta went on to play in the lower leagues for Děčín, Zeman Brno, Mutěnice and Velké Meziříčí.

== International career ==
Having scored on his only appearance for the Czechoslovakia Olympic team in 1987, Kukleta made his debut for the full national side in January 1991 in a friendly match against Australia. His only competitive appearance was in a 2–0 UEFA Euro 1992 qualifying win against Albania, where he played alongside Pavel Kuka.

== Personal life ==
Kukleta was divorced and had a son, Roman. He worked as a lorry driver after his footballing career. Kukleta died suddenly in October 2011.

== Honours ==
Sparta Prague

- Czechoslovak First League: 1988–89, 1989–90, 1990–91
- Czechoslovak Cup: 1988–89

Individual

- Czechoslovak First League top scorer: 1990–91
