= Lukáš Michal =

Czech footballer

Personal information
- Full name: Lukáš Michal
- Date of birth: 17 August 1983 (age 43)
- Place of birth: Czechoslovakia
- Position: Midfielder

Senior career*
Years	Team	Apps	(Gls)
2001–2006	FK Chmel Blšany	61	(1)
2006–2008	SK Kladno	3	(0)
2007	→ FK Čáslav (loan)		
2007–2008	→ FK Dukla Prague (loan)		

International career
2001	Czech Republic U17	5	(0)
2001	Czech Republic U19	2	(0)
2002–2003	Czech Republic U20	5	(0)
- * Club domestic league appearances and goals

Lukáš Michal (born 17 August 1983) is a Czech former footballer who played as a midfielder. He played in the Czech First League for Blšany and Kladno.
