= Vlastimil Karal =

Czech footballer

Personal information
- Date of birth: 26 April 1983 (age 43)
- Place of birth: Czechoslovakia
- Height: 1.85 m (6 ft 1 in)
- Position: Defender

Team information
- Current team: Bohemians Prague

Senior career*
Years	Team	Apps	(Gls)
2008	Bohemians 1905	15	(0)
2009–2011	Hradec Králové	42	(1)
2011–2013	Čáslav	55	(5)
2013–	Bohemians Prague	4	(0)
- * Club domestic league appearances and goals as of 31 December 2013

Vlastimil Karal (born 26 April 1983) is a Czech football defender currently playing for Bohemians Prague in the Czech 2. Liga.

== Career statistics ==
Club	Season	League		Cup		Other		Total	
Club	Season	Apps	Goals	Apps	Goals	Apps	Goals	Apps	Goals
Bohemians 1905	2007–08	5	0	0	0	0	0	5	0
Bohemians 1905	2008–09	10	0	0	0	0	0	10	0
Bohemians 1905	Total	15	0	0	0	0	0	15	0
Hradec Králové	2008–09	10	1	0	0	0	0	10	1
Hradec Králové	2009–10	22	0	0	0	0	0	22	0
Hradec Králové	2010–11	10	0	0	0	0	0	10	0
Hradec Králové	Total	42	1	0	0	0	0	42	1
Čáslav	2011–12	28	3	0	0	0	0	28	3
Čáslav	2012–13	27	2	0	0	0	0	27	2
Čáslav	Total	55	5	0	0	0	0	55	5
Career total		112	6	0	0	0	0	112	6

Statistics accurate as of 30 June 2013
