= Sobotín =

- Municipality
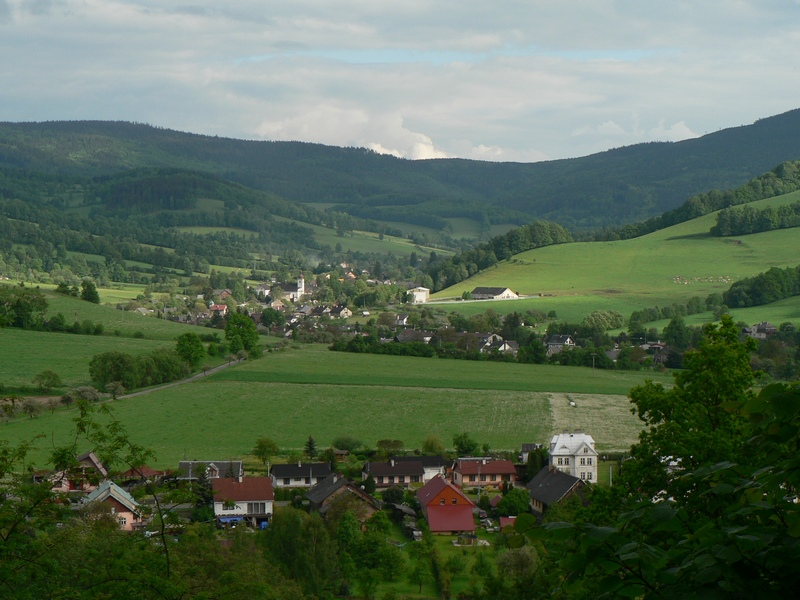
- General view of Sobotín

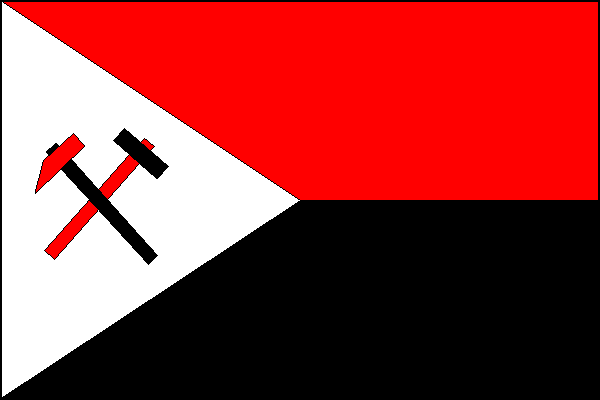
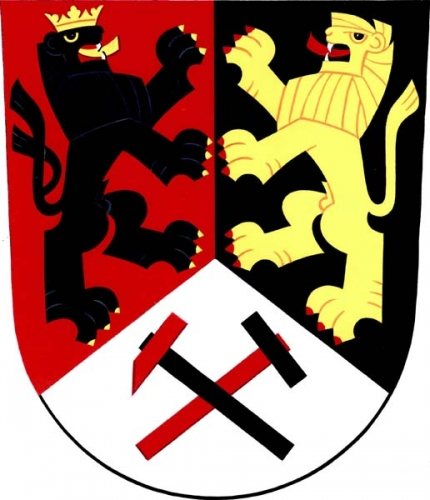
- Flag Coat of arms

- Location in the Czech Republic
- Coordinates: 50°0′42″N 17°5′27″E
- Country: Czech Republic
- Region: Olomouc
- District: Šumperk
- First mentioned: 1351

Area
  - Total: 31.94 km^{2} (12.33 sq mi)
- Elevation: 425 m (1,394 ft)

Population (2026-01-01)
  - Total: 1,154
  - Density: 36.13/km^{2} (93.58/sq mi)
- Time zone: UTC+1 (CET)
  - Summer (DST): UTC+2 (CEST)
- Postal code: 788 16
- Website: www.sobotin.cz

Sobotín (German: Zöptau) is a municipality and village in Šumperk District in the Olomouc Region of the Czech Republic. It has about 1,200 inhabitants.

== Administrative division ==
Sobotín consists of three municipal parts (in brackets population according to the 2021 census):

- Sobotín (995)
- Klepáčov (11)
- Rudoltice (84)

== Geography ==
Sobotín is located about 9 kilometres (6 mi) northeast of Šumperk and 48 km (30 mi) north of Olomouc. It lies mostly in the Hanušovice Highlands. In the east, the municipal territory extends into the Hrubý Jeseník mountain range and includes the highest point of Sobotín at 1,125 m (3,691 ft) above sea level.

== History ==
The first written mention of Sobotín is from 1351. The history of Sobotín is connected with the iron ore mining in the area.

In 1844, the Klein family came into the village and had the local industrial building rebuilt into a castle. This family of German businesspeople was very active in the life of the municipality. After World War II, they were expelled together with the German-speaking population of the municipality.

On 1 January 2010, the new municipality of Petrov nad Desnou (including the village of Petrov nad Desnou and the settlement of Terezín) separated from Sobotín.

== Demographics ==
Historical population

| Year | Pop. | ±% |
|---|---|---|
| 1869 | 3,407 | — |
| 1880 | 3,277 | −3.8% |
| 1890 | 3,062 | −6.6% |
| 1900 | 2,939 | −4.0% |
| 1910 | 2,633 | −10.4% |

| Year | Pop. | ±% |
|---|---|---|
| 1921 | 2,434 | −7.6% |
| 1930 | 2,199 | −9.7% |
| 1950 | 1,301 | −40.8% |
| 1961 | 1,349 | +3.7% |
| 1970 | 1,195 | −11.4% |

| Year | Pop. | ±% |
|---|---|---|
| 1980 | 1,355 | +13.4% |
| 1991 | 1,236 | −8.8% |
| 2001 | 1,251 | +1.2% |
| 2011 | 1,168 | −6.6% |
| 2021 | 1,090 | −6.7% |

Source: Censuses

== Transport ==
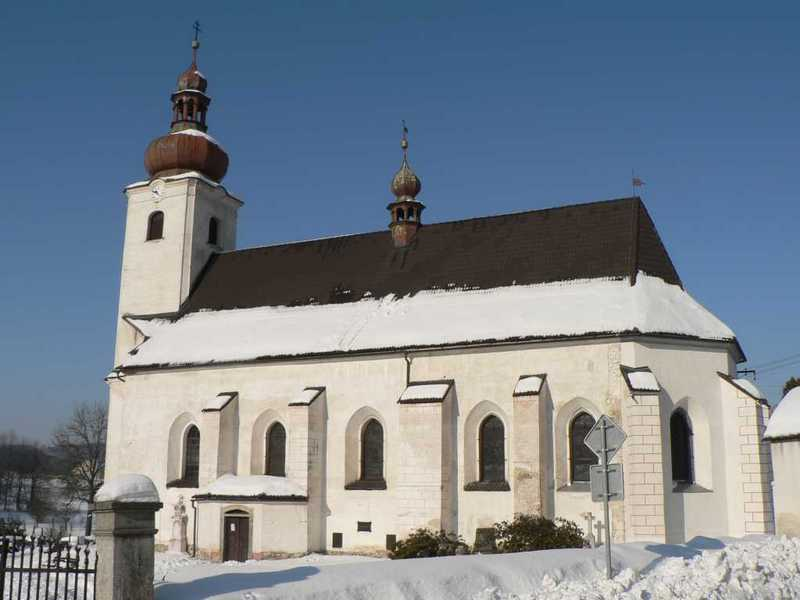
Church of Saint Lawrence

The I/11 road from Šumperk to Bruntál runs through the municipality.

== Sights ==
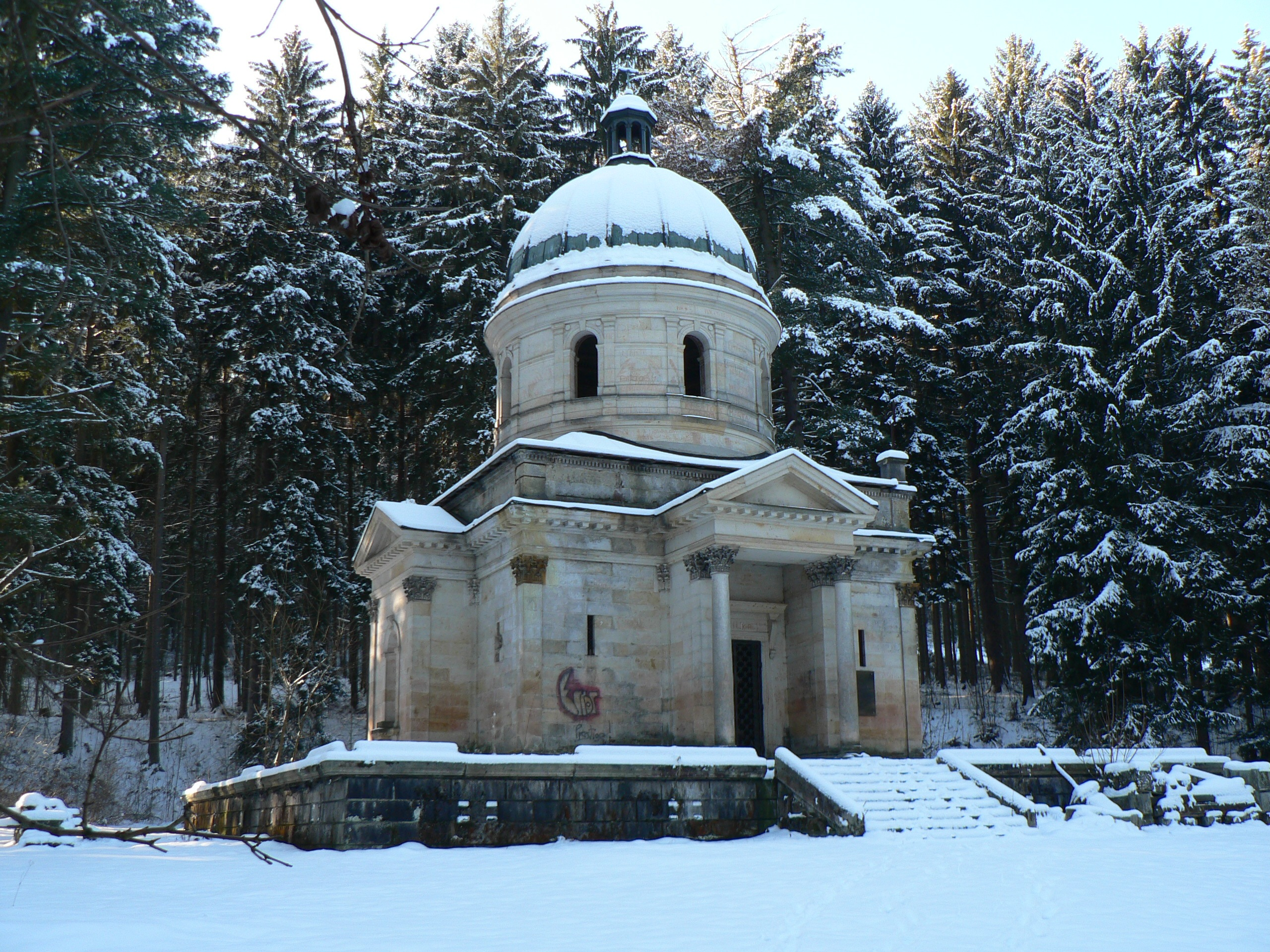
Klein family mausoleum

Historic landmarks of Sobotín are the Klein family mausoleum and the Sobotín Castle. The mausoleum, built in 1885, was inspired by the work of the Italian Renaissance architect Andrea Palladio. The castle was built after 1844 and adjacent lands were transformed into a nature park in which exotic trees were planted. Today the castle serves as a hotel.

The Church of Saint Lawrence is a significant architectural work. It was built in the late Renaissance style. Before 1620, the church was Protestant.

The Church of Saint John of Baptist is located in Klepáčov. It is a rare wooden folk church, which dates from 1783.
