= Richard Kalod =

Czech footballer

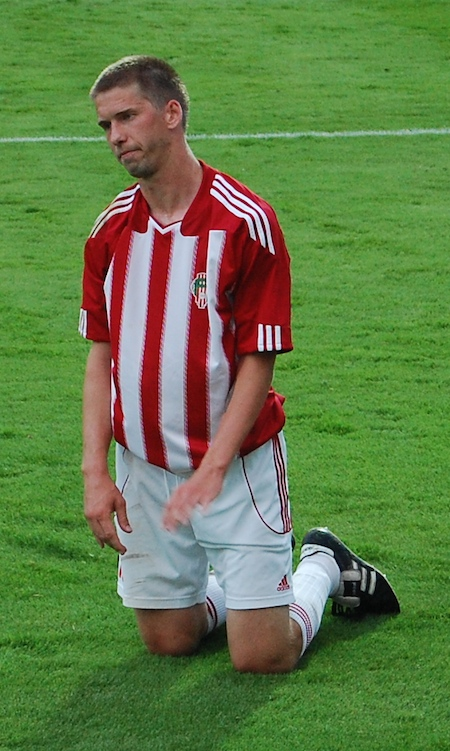

Personal information
- Date of birth: 8 May 1984 (age 42)
- Place of birth: Czechoslovakia
- Height: 1.93 m (6 ft 4 in)
- Position: Forward

Team information
- Current team: SK Dynamo České Budějovice
- Number: 27

Senior career*
Years	Team	Apps	(Gls)
2004–2005	Zlín	11	(0)
2004	→ Kroměříž (loan)		
2005–2013	FK Viktoria Žižkov	104	(22)
2013–	SK Dynamo České Budějovice		
- * Club domestic league appearances and goals as of 30 June 2012

Richard Kalod (born 8 May 1984) is a professional Czech football player who currently plays for SK Dynamo České Budějovice. He previously played regularly for Viktoria Žižkov for several years, where his role usually involved him playing a ball winning job up front, often alone. He is an uncompromising player who has scored several match winning goals. As a result, he was popular with Žižkov's fans.
