= Katnajur =

Katnajur Կաթնաջուր
- Location within Armenia
- Coordinates: 40°49′30″N 44°08′29″E
- Country: Armenia
- Marz (Province): Lori Province
- Elevation: 1,720 m (5,640 ft)

Population (2011)
  - Total: 1,536
- Time zone: UTC+4 ( )
  - Summer (DST): UTC+5 ( )

Katnajur (Armenian: Կաթնաջուր, also romanized as Kat’najur and Katnadzhur; formerly, Karal) is a town in the Lori Province of Armenia.
