= Skaštice =

- Municipality
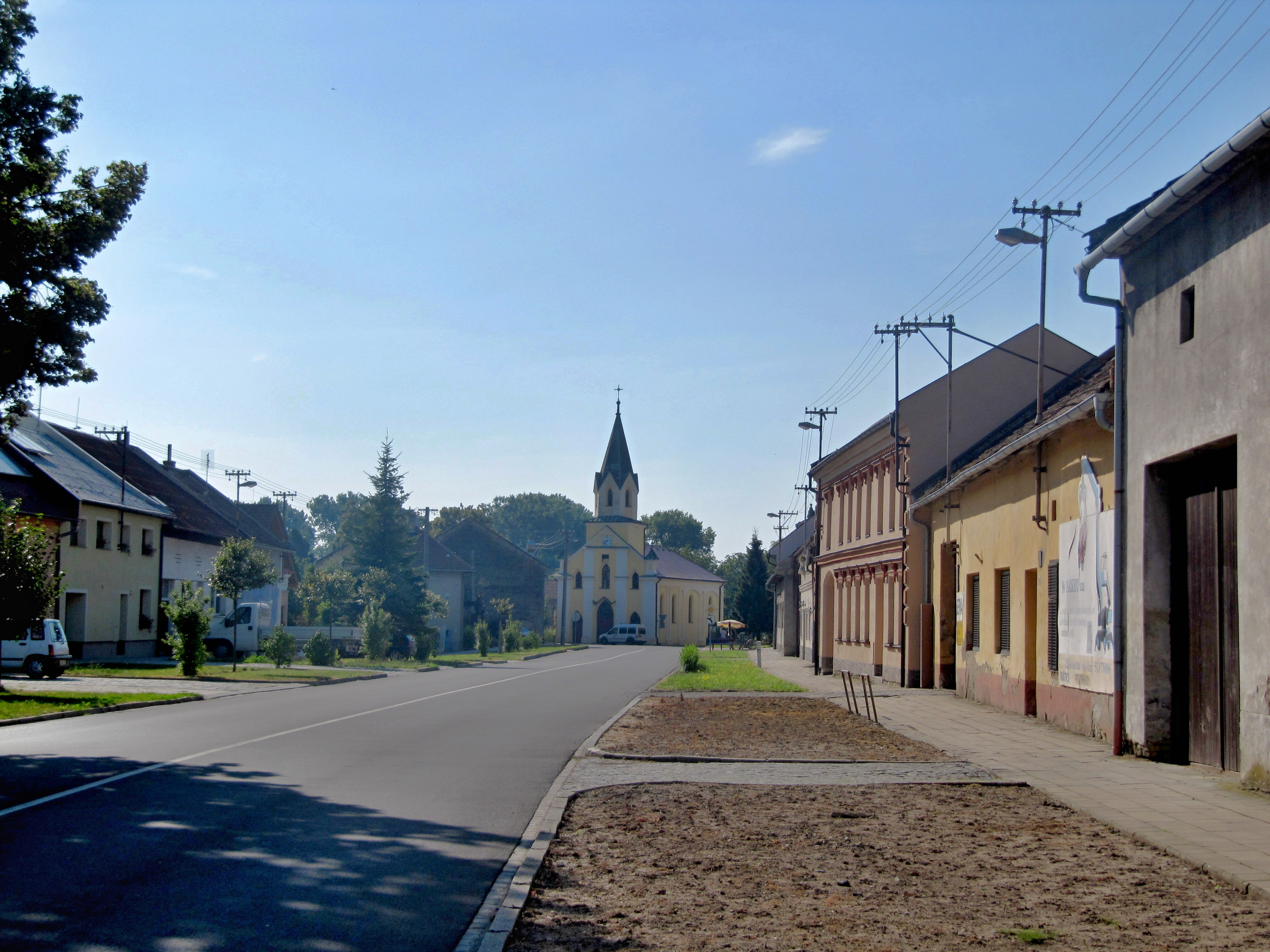
- Main street and Church of Saint Florian

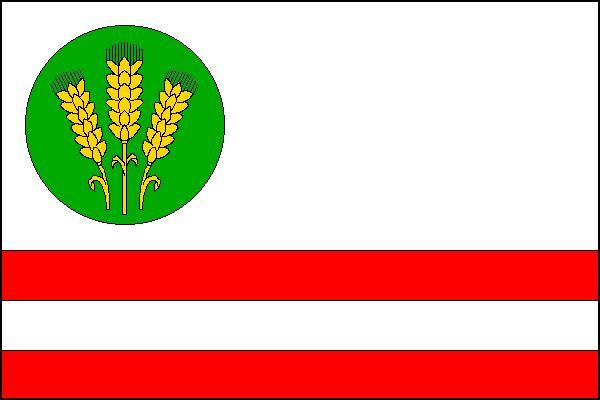
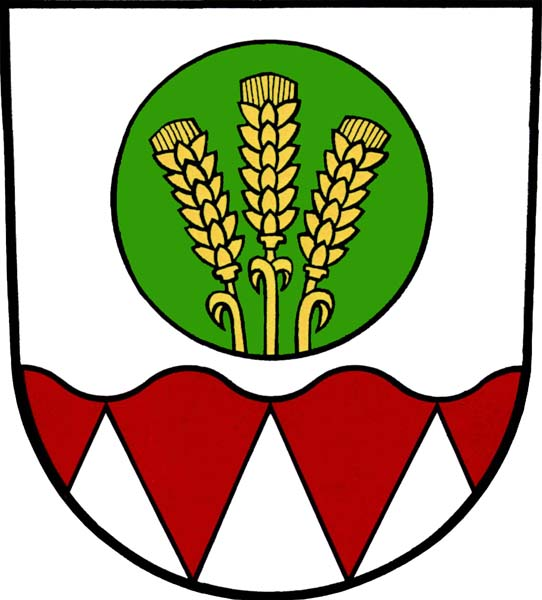
- Flag Coat of arms

- Location in the Czech Republic
- Coordinates: 49°19′56″N 17°25′3″E
- Country: Czech Republic
- Region: Zlín
- District: Kroměříž
- First mentioned: 1267

Area
  - Total: 7.73 km^{2} (2.98 sq mi)
- Elevation: 192 m (630 ft)

Population (2026-01-01)
  - Total: 362
  - Density: 46.8/km^{2} (121/sq mi)
- Time zone: UTC+1 (CET)
  - Summer (DST): UTC+2 (CEST)
- Postal code: 767 01
- Website: www.skastice.cz

Skaštice is a municipality and village in Kroměříž District in the Zlín Region of the Czech Republic. It has about 400 inhabitants.

Skaštice lies approximately 4 kilometres (2 mi) north-east of Kroměříž, 22 km (14 mi) north-west of Zlín, and 232 km (144 mi) east of Prague.

== Demographics ==
Historical population
Year	Pop.	±%
1869	490	—
1880	533	+8.8%
1890	645	+21.0%
1900	702	+8.8%
1910	664	−5.4%
1921	663	−0.2%
1930	621	−6.3%
1950	484	−22.1%
1961	452	−6.6%
1970	395	−12.6%
1980	356	−9.9%
1991	330	−7.3%
2001	369	+11.8%
2011	377	+2.2%
2021	357	−5.3%
Source: Censuses
