= Richard Veverka =

Czech footballer

Personal information
- Date of birth: 16 December 1987 (age 38)
- Place of birth: Czechoslovakia
- Position: Forward

Team information
- Current team: FK Ústí nad Labem
- Number: 19

Senior career*
Years	Team	Apps	(Gls)
2007–2010	Teplice	8	(0)
2008–2009	→ Ústí nad Labem (loan)	38	(16)
2010–	Ústí nad Labem	34	(6)
- * Club domestic league appearances and goals as of 31 December 2011

Richard Veverka (born 16 December 1987) is a professional Czech football player who currently plays for FK Ústí nad Labem. He finished among the top scorers in the 2009–10 Czech 2. Liga.
