= Michal Farkaš =

Slovak footballer

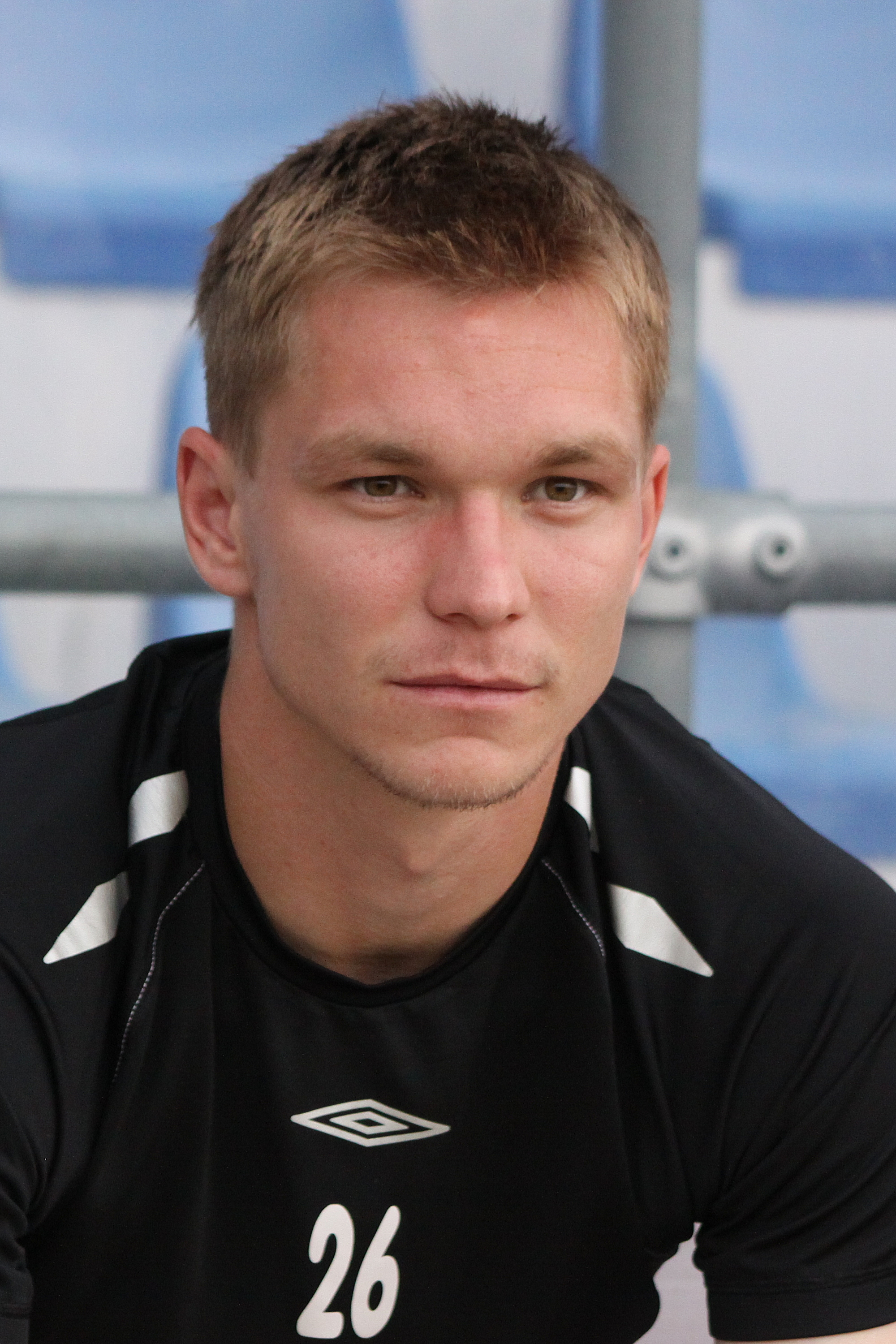

Personal information
- Date of birth: 10 March 1985 (age 41)
- Place of birth: Zlaté Moravce, Czechoslovakia
- Height: 1.78 m (5 ft 10 in)
- Position: Defender

Team information
- Current team: Zagłębie Sosnowiec II (caretaker manager)

Youth career
- –2004: FC Nitra

Senior career*
Years	Team	Apps	(Gls)
2004–2009	Nitra	97	(4)
2009–2010	Jablonec	3	(0)
2010–2011	Ruch Radzionków	13	(0)
2011–2013	GKS Katowice	36	(0)
2013–2014	Ruch Radzionków	10	(3)
2014–2015	Zagłębie Sosnowiec	11	(0)
2015	Odra Wodzisław		
2016	SKS Łagisza		

Managerial career
- 2015–2016: Zagłębie Sosnowiec (youth)
- 2019: Zagłębie Sosnowiec (caretaker)
- 2022–2023: Ruch Radzionków
- 2026–: Zagłębie Sosnowiec II (caretaker)
- * Club domestic league appearances and goals

Michal Farkaš (born 10 March 1985) is a Slovak professional football coach and former player who played as a defender. He is currently the caretaker manager of Zagłębie Sosnowiec II.

== Career ==
In July 2011, Farkaš joined GKS Katowice.

== Honours ==
Ruch Radzionków

- II liga West: 2009–10
