= Matěj Helešic =

Czech footballer (born 1996)

Personal information
- Date of birth: 12 November 1996 (age 30)
- Place of birth: Czech Republic
- Height: 1.75 m (5 ft 9 in)
- Position: Left back

Team information
- Current team: Opava
- Number: 22

Youth career
- Baník Ostrava

Senior career*
Years	Team	Apps	(Gls)
2015–2020	Baník Ostrava	31	(0)
2017	→ Č. Budějovice (loan)	4	(0)
2018–2019	→ Č. Budějovice (loan)	30	(1)
2019	→ Č. Budějovice (loan)	8	(0)
2020	→ Opava (loan)	9	(0)
2020–2022	Opava	58	(13)
2022–2025	Pardubice	39	(0)
2024	→ Dukla Prague (loan)	9	(1)
2024–2025	→ Opava (loan)	29	(1)
2025–	Opava	29	(2)

International career
2013–2014	Czech Republic U18	14	(0)
2015–2016	Czech Republic U19	3	(0)
2016–2017	Czech Republic U20	7	(0)
- * Club domestic league appearances and goals as of 28 May 2026

Matěj Helešic (born 12 November 1996) is a professional Czech football defender currently playing for Opava in the Czech National Football League.
