= Přední Kopanina =

Coordinates: 50°07′N 14°18′E

- Suburb
- Interactive map of Přední Kopanina
- Country: Czech Republic
- City: Prague

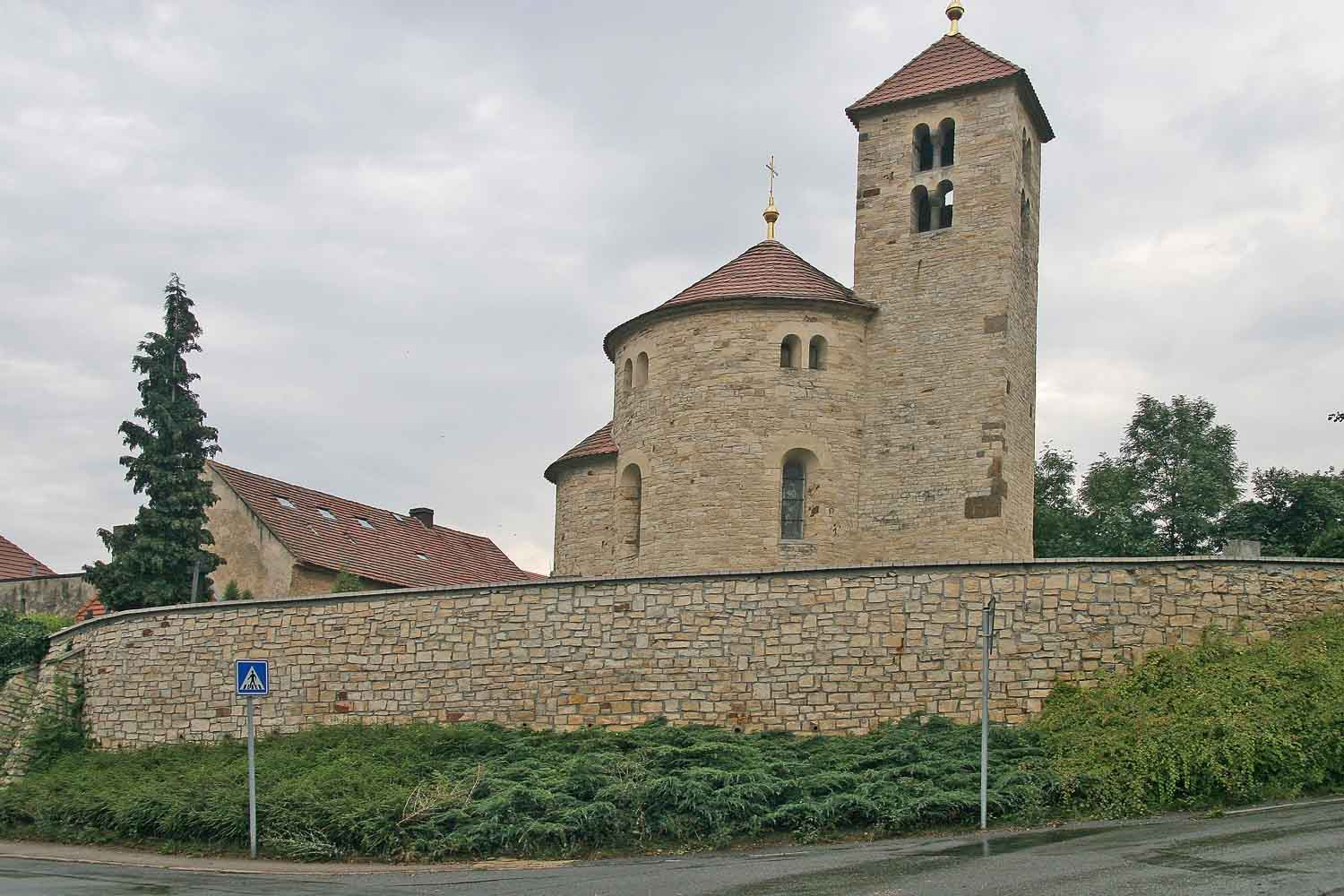
The Rotunda of St Mary Magdalene

Přední Kopanina is a suburb of Prague, Czech Republic. It is located 10 km (6.2 mi) northwest of the city centre in the vicinity of Václav Havel Airport Prague and has a population of 667 (2006). First mentioned in 1285, it was incorporated as a municipal district of Prague in 1974. The main local sight is a Romanesque rotunda of St Mary Magdalene from the first half of the 12th century.
