= MFK Havířov =

- Full name: MFK Havířov z. s.
- Nicknames: Indiáni (Indians)
- Founded: 1922 (as ČSK Moravská Suchá)
- Ground: Stadion Dukla
- Capacity: 7,500
- Chairman: Pavel Malcharek
- Manager: Jakub Hottek
- League: Czech Fourth Division – Divize F
- 2025–26: 1st (champions)
Home colours	Away colours

MFK Havířov is a Czech football club located in Havířov. It currently plays in the Moravian-Silesian Football League.

In the 1993–94, 1994–95, 1995–96 and 1996–97 seasons, the club played in the Czech 2. Liga.

== Historical names ==
- 1922 ČSK Moravská Suchá
- AFK Suchá
- SK Beskyd Havířov
- Baník Dukla Havířov
- Baník Dukla Suchá
- TJ Dolu Dukla Suchá
- TJ Baník Havířov
- FK Baník Havířov
- 2003 FK Havířov
- 2006 MFK Havířov

== Managers ==
- Bohuš Keler
