= Lukáš Matůš =

Czech footballer

Personal information
- Full name: Lukáš Matůš
- Date of birth: October 6, 1980 (age 46)
- Place of birth: Czech Republic
- Height: 1.80 m (5 ft 11 in)
- Position: Forward

Youth career
- Sokol Francova Lhota
- FC Vsetín
- Fastav Zlín

Senior career*
Years	Team	Apps	(Gls)
- FC Brumov
- Kunovice
- HS Kroměříž
- Kunovice
- HS Kroměříž
2006–2008	Bohemians 1905	6	(1)
2008–2009	Slovácko		
2009–2011	Fotbal Třinec	23	(2)
2011–2012	Dunajská Streda	51	(3)
2012	Ostbahn XI	13	(2)
2013–2016	Slavičín		
2017–2019	FC Vsetín		
- * Club domestic league appearances and goals

Lukáš Matůš (born 6 October 1980) is a Czech footballer who plays as a forward.
