= 1985–86 Czechoslovak First League =

Czechoslovak First League
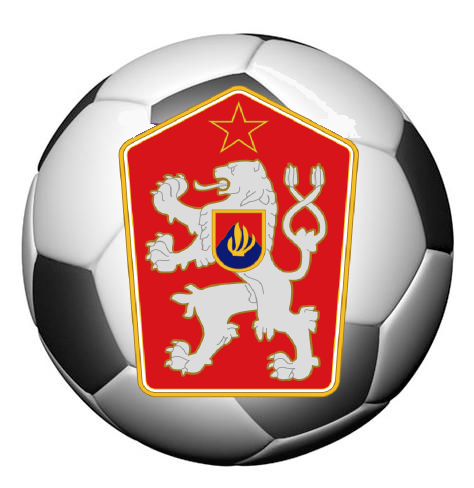
- Season: 1985–86
- Dates: 27 August 1985 – 19 June 1986
- Champions: Vítkovice
- Relegated: Lokomotíva Košice; Inter Bratislava
- European Cup: Vítkovice
- Cup Winners' Cup: Spartak Trnava
- UEFA Cup: Sparta Prague; Dukla Prague; Sigma Olomouc
- Matches: 240
- Goals: 643 (2.68 per match)
- Top goalscorer: Stanislav Griga (19 goals)
- Biggest home win: Dukla Prague 10–0 České Budějovice (9 March 1986)
- Biggest away win: Dukla Banská Bystrica 0–7 Slavia Prague (14 June 1986)
- Highest attendance: 19,536; Sparta Prague 0–0 Slavia Prague (25 May 1986)
- Lowest attendance: 340; Inter Bratislava 2–1 Ostrava (12 June 1986)
- Total attendance: 1,177,081
- Average attendance: 4,905

Statistics of Czechoslovak First League in the 1985–86 season. The season began on 27 August 1985 and concluded on 19 June 1986.

== Overview ==
It was contested by 16 teams, and FC Vítkovice won the championship. Stanislav Griga was the league's top scorer with 19 goals.

== Stadia and locations ==
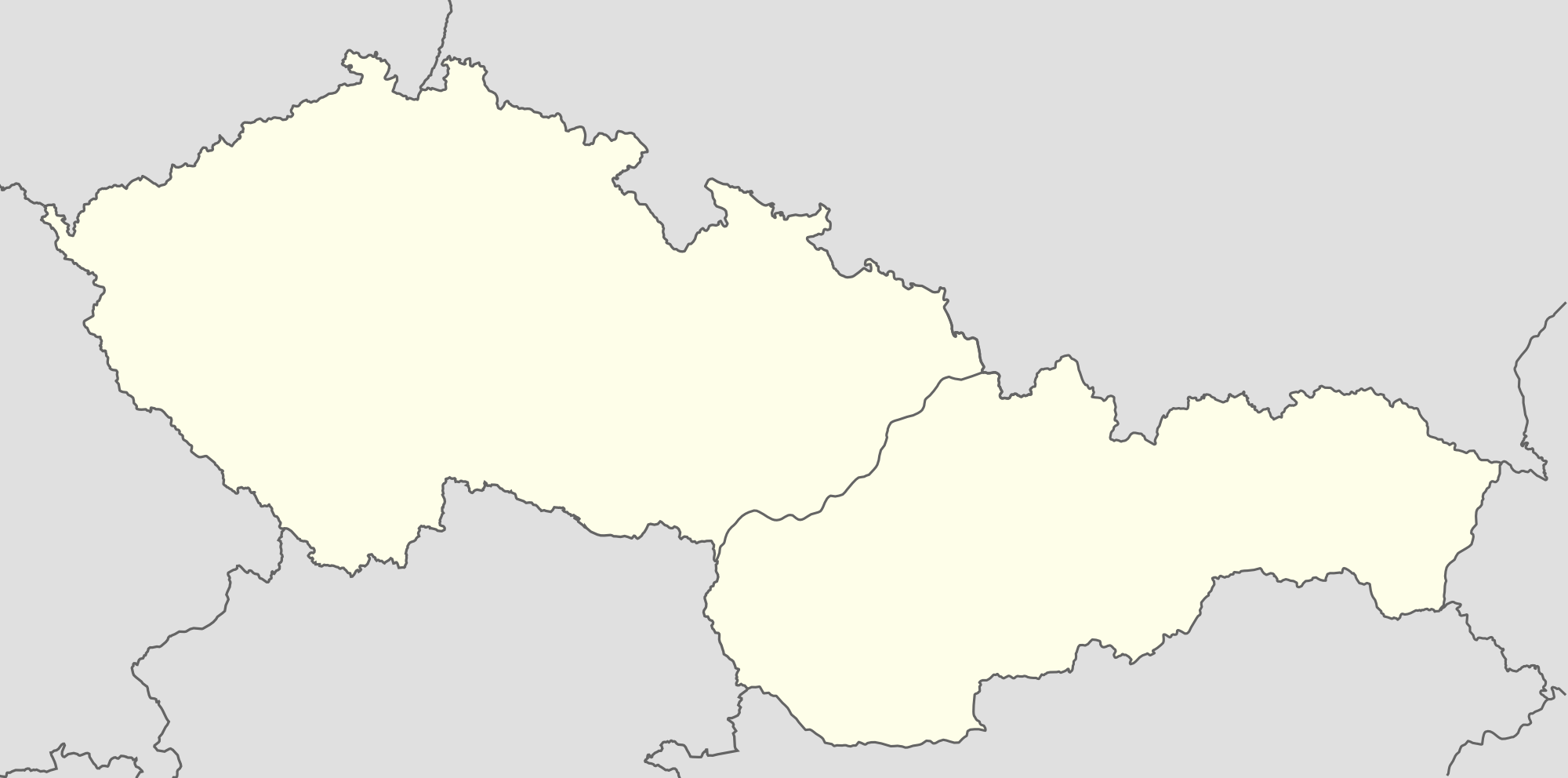
Location of clubs in the 1985–86 Czechoslovak First League

== League standings ==
Pos	Team	Pld	W	D	L	GF	GA	GD	Pts	Qualification or relegation
1	Vítkovice (C)	30	14	12	4	48	32	+16	40	Qualification for European Cup first round
2	Sparta Prague	30	15	7	8	75	30	+45	37	Qualification for UEFA Cup first round
3	Dukla Prague	30	13	8	9	60	34	+26	34	Qualification for UEFA Cup first round
4	Sigma Olomouc	30	12	10	8	55	40	+15	34	Qualification for UEFA Cup first round
5	Bohemians Prague	30	12	10	8	52	37	+15	34	
6	Slavia Prague	30	15	4	11	37	28	+9	34	
7	RH Cheb	30	14	3	13	49	48	+1	31	
8	Baník Ostrava	30	11	8	11	41	34	+7	30	
9	Dukla Banská Bystrica	30	9	10	11	34	45	−11	28	
10	Spartak Trnava	30	9	9	12	25	32	−7	27	Qualification for Cup Winners' Cup first round
11	DAC Dunajská Streda	30	9	9	12	27	43	−16	27	
12	Tatran Prešov	30	11	4	15	26	45	−19	26	
13	ZVL Žilina	30	9	8	13	30	50	−20	26	
14	Dynamo České Budějovice	30	7	11	12	31	46	−15	25	
15	Lokomotíva Košice (R)	30	8	8	14	29	45	−16	24	Relegation to Slovak National Football League
16	Inter Bratislava (R)	30	9	5	16	24	54	−30	23	Relegation to Slovak National Football League

Source: rsssf.com
(C) Champions; (R) Relegated

== Results ==
Home \ Away	OST	BOH	DAC	BB	DUK	ČBU	INT	LOK	CHE	OLO	SLA	SPA	TRN	PRE	VÍT	ŽIL
Baník Ostrava		2–4	3–0	1–0	1–0	2–0	2–0	4–0	4–0	1–1	0–1	1–1	0–0	2–0	2–2	2–0
Bohemians Prague	1–1		8–0	2–0	4–2	0–0	0–0	2–0	3–1	2–2	0–0	2–1	2–0	5–0	3–1	4–0
DAC Dunajská Streda	1–0	1–1		2–0	0–0	2–3	3–0	1–0	1–0	0–0	2–1	3–3	2–0	2–0	0–0	1–0
Dukla Banská Bystrica	0–1	1–1	2–0		1–1	2–1	3–0	2–0	2–1	2–0	0–7	2–1	1–1	2–0	1–1	2–0
Dukla Prague	1–2	4–1	1–1	3–2		10–0	2–1	1–2	2–2	2–0	5–1	1–0	2–0	2–0	0–2	7–2
Dynamo České Budějovice	1–1	2–1	1–1	0–0	1–4		3–0	3–2	5–0	1–1	1–0	0–0	0–2	2–0	0–0	0–0
Inter Bratislava	2–1	2–0	1–1	3–1	0–2	2–0		1–0	2–1	0–0	2–1	0–5	0–0	1–0	0–1	2–2
Lokomotiva Košice	1–1	0–0	0–0	2–2	1–0	0–0	3–0		0–1	2–1	0–0	1–4	2–1	2–1	1–1	4–1
RH Cheb	3–1	4–0	2–0	4–0	2–2	4–1	2–0	1–0		2–1	3–1	1–4	1–0	6–2	2–0	0–0
Sigma Olomouc	3–1	6–1	4–0	1–1	1–1	3–3	3–1	2–3	1–0		1–0	3–1	2–0	2–1	6–3	3–0
Slavia Prague	1–1	1–0	2–1	1–0	2–0	1–0	4–1	1–0	2–1	1–2		1–0	2–0	1–0	0–0	1–0
Sparta Prague	1–0	0–0	3–0	5–0	0–2	2–1	6–0	8–1	9–2	5–2	2–1		0–0	4–0	3–0	3–0
Spartak Trnava	5–2	1–0	1–0	1–1	1–1	1–1	1–0	2–0	1–3	1–1	1–0	1–0		2–3	0–0	2–0
Tatran Prešov	1–0	2–2	2–1	1–1	1–0	1–0	0–1	2–1	1–0	1–0	0–1	2–1	1–0		0–0	2–0
Vítkovice	2–1	3–1	3–0	3–2	2–1	2–1	5–1	0–0	2–0	3–2	2–1	1–1	4–0	1–1		3–1
ZVL Žilina	2–1	0–2	2–1	1–1	1–1	2–0	2–1	2–1	1–0	1–1	3–1	2–2	1–0	3–1	1–1	

Source: statistiky1ligy.fotbal.cz
Legend: Blue = home team win; Yellow = draw; Red = away team win.

== Top goalscorers ==
Rank	Player	Club	Goals
1	(Czechoslovakia) Stanislav Griga	Sparta Prague	19
2	(Czechoslovakia) Vladislav Lauda	Sigma Olomouc	16
2	(Czechoslovakia) Luboš Kubík	Slavia Prague	16
4	(Czechoslovakia) Petar Novák	Sparta Prague	15
5	(Czechoslovakia) Tomáš Skuhravý	RH Cheb	13
5	(Czechoslovakia) Miroslav Příložný	Sigma Olomouc	13

== Attendances ==
#	Club	Average	Highest
1	Sparta Praha	9,536	19,536
2	Sigma Olomouc	8,400	12,000
3	DAC	7,255	9,844
4	Slavia Praha	6,345	14,695
5	Ostrava	5,478	10,638
6	České Budějovice	5,352	8,380
7	Bohemians	5,245	12,913
8	Vítkovice	5,003	11,935
9	Cheb	4,133	8,029
10	Spartak Trnava	4,019	8,878
11	Dukla Banská Bystrica	3,962	6,196
12	Žilina	3,234	5,818
13	Tatran Prešov	2,914	6,750
14	Košice	2,551	6,372
15	Inter Bratislava	2,441	8,546
16	Dukla Praha	1,732	6,959
