= FC Odra Petřkovice =

- Full name: FC ODRA Petřkovice z.s.
- Founded: 1936; 89 years ago
- Ground: Stadion FC Odra Petřkovice, Ostrava
- Capacity: 1,500
- Chairman: Petr Táč
- League: Moravian-Silesian Region, A3B – CANIS I.B group B - 7.tier
- 2024–25: 5th
- Website: www.fcodrapetrkovice.cz
Home colours

FC Odra Petřkovice is a Czech football club located in the Petřkovice district of Ostrava. It currently plays in the I. B třída Moravskoslezského kraje, which is the seventh tier of Czech football.

Petřkovice won promotion to the MSFL in 2016, with two games left at the end of the 2016–17 season of the Czech Fourth Division. To mark 80 years of the club's existence, the club played a match against FC Baník Ostrava, winning 1–0 in September 2016.

== Historical names ==
- 1936 – SK Petřkovice (Sportovní klub Petřkovice)
- 1945 – TJ Sokol Petřkovice (Tělovýchovná jednota Sokol Petřkovice)
- 1967 – TJ Vítězný únor Ostrava (Tělovýchovná jednota Vítězný únor Ostrava)
- 1990 – HTJ Odra Ostrava (Hornická tělovýchovná jednota Odra Ostrava)
- 1995 – FC Odra Petřkovice (Football Club Odra Petřkovice)

== Czech Cup ==
The team reached the second round of the Czech Cup in 2017–18, defeating FK Bohumín 4–0 in the first round.
