= SFC Opava =

- Full name: Slezský fotbalový club Opava a.s.
- Nicknames: Slezský, žlutomodří
- Founded: 1907; 119 years ago
- Ground: Stadion v Městských sadech
- Capacity: 7,758
- Chairman: Tomáš Hůlovec
- Manager: Ondřej Smetana
- League: Czech National Football League
- 2025–26: 7th of 16
- Website: www.sfc.cz
Home colours	Away colours

Slezský FC Opava is a professional football club based in Opava, Czech Republic. The club plays in the Czech National Football League, the second of Czech football after being relegated from the Czech First League at the end of the 2020–21 season.

== History ==
The club was in the Czech First League at the top tier of Czech football from 1995 to 2000, getting relegated in 2000 but returning to the top flight the following season in 2001. After another relegation they returned again in 2003 and had a two-year spell in the top division, but internal issues led to a slow decline of the club and relegation to the regional division. The club celebrated a return to the Second Division in 2011, but after just two seasons, they were relegated back to the Moravian–Silesian Football League (MSFL) in 2013. The club won promotion back into the second level of football in their first season in the MSFL. They won the Czech National Football League in 2018, securing promotion to the top flight. However they were relegated to the National League again in 2021.

On 9 January 2024, Slovak company A.I.K. spol. s.r.o. bought the club from the city of Opava. Transaction was fully completed on 18 March 2024, Andrej Krajíček become the new owner.

== Historical names ==
- 1907–09 – Troppauer Fussballverein
- 1909–39 – Deutscher Sportverein Troppau
- 1939–45 – NS Turngemeinde Troppau
- 1945–48 – SK Slezan Opava
- 1948–50 – Sokol Slezan Opava
- 1950–53 – ZSJ SPJP Opava
- 1953–58 – TJ Baník Opava
- 1958–90 – TJ Ostroj Opava
- 1990–94 – FK Ostroj Opava
- 1994–98 – FC Kaučuk Opava
- Since 1998 – SFC Opava

== Fans and rivalries ==
The club has a group of fanatical fans called Opaváci who frequently produce tifos and displays, as well as travel to away games. They have a friendship with fellow Silesian team Śląsk Wrocław and have derby rivalries with FC Baník Ostrava and FC Hlučín, with the matches between them known as the Silesian Derby.

== Players ==
=== Current squad ===
As of 8 September 2026.

Note: Flags indicate national team as defined under FIFA eligibility rules; some limited exceptions apply. Players may hold more than one non-FIFA nationality.

No.	Pos.	Nation	Player
4	DF	CZE	Jaromír Srubek
5	DF	SEN	Amadou Aidara
6	DF	CZE	Jiří Janoščín
7	MF	CZE	Felix Čejka
8	DF	CZE	Filip Štěpánek
9	FW	CZE	Barnabáš Lacík
10	FW	CZE	Ladislav Mužík
11	FW	CZE	Lukáš Bránecký (on loan from Zlín)
14	MF	SVK	Marcel Novák
16	MF	CZE	Eliáš Barteska
17	MF	CZE	Denis Darmovzal

No.	Pos.	Nation	Player
20	DF	CZE	Roman Zálešák
21	MF	BIH	Nikola Turanjanin
22	DF	CZE	Matěj Helešic
23	DF	CZE	Ondřej Lehoczki
26	MF	SVK	Timotej Múdry
31	GK	CZE	Jiří Ciupa
40	FW	NGR	Hamza Abdullahi
83	GK	MKD	Stefan Jovanoski (on loan from Mladá Boleslav)
99	FW	SEN	Aliou Diao
77	FW	SVK	Peter Juritka
—	MF	GER	Dennis Owusu (on loan from Baník Ostrava)

=== Out on loan ===
Note: Flags indicate national team as defined under FIFA eligibility rules; some limited exceptions apply. Players may hold more than one non-FIFA nationality.

No.	Pos.	Nation	Player

== Player records in the Czech First League ==
As of 3 June 2024 (after the last club's season in the Czech First League)

=== Most appearances ===
#	Name	Matches
1	(Czech Republic) Jan Baránek	145
2	(Czech Republic) Jaroslav Kolínek	138
3	(Czech Republic) Alois Grussmann	131
4	(Czech Republic) Miroslav Kamas	129
5	(Czech Republic) Roman Hendrych	119
6	(Czech Republic) Tomáš Vychodil	93

=== Most goals ===
#	Name	Goals
1	(Czech Republic) Alois Grussmann	33
2	(Czech Republic) Jan Baránek	17
3	(Czech Republic) Radomír Prasek	13
4	(Czech Republic) Roman Hendrych	12
4	(Czech Republic) Martin Rozhon	12
4	(Czech Republic) Jiří Bartl	12

=== Most clean sheets ===
#	Name	Clean sheets
1	(Czech Republic) René Twardzik	22
2	(Czech Republic) Vilém Fendrich	15
3	(Czech Republic) Petr Vašek	11

== Managers ==
- Vlastimil Bělík (1945–?)
- Jan Novák (late 1940s)
- Václav Smetánka (late 1940s)
- Karel Novák (1957)
- Milan Pouba (1958 – April 1961)
- Josef Černohorský (April 1961 – September 1961)
- Milan Pouba (September 1961 – 1963), second term
- Karel Čapek (1963–1964)
- Milan Pouba (1964–1965)
- Karel Čapek (1965 – September 1966)
- Jan Balnar (September 1966 – 1967)
- Milan Pouba (1967 – August 1968)
- Karel Novák (September 1968 – 1970)
- Anton Krásnohorský (1970)
- Evžen Hadamczik (1970–1978)
- Karel Větrovec (1978)
- Květoslav Stříž (1978)
- Milan Pouba (1978–1979)
- Petr Hudec (1979–1980)
- Milan Pouba (1980–1981)
- Alois Sommer (1981–1990)
- Petr Žemlík (1990–1992)
- Petr Ondrášek (1992)
- Oldřich Sedláček (1992 – April 1993)
- Alois Sommer (1993)
- Jaroslav Pindor (1993)
- Jaroslav Gürtler (1993–1994)
- Petr Žemlík (1994–1997)
- Jiří Nejedlý (1997–1998)
- Petr Žemlík (1998)
- Jiří Bartl (1998–2000)
- Petr Uličný (2000)
- Bohuš Keler (2000–01)
- Miroslav Mentel (2001–02)
- Karel Jarůšek (2002–03)
- Pavel Hapal (2003–04)
- Vlastimil Palička (2004–05)
- Radoslav Látal (2008–09)
- Josef Mazura (2010–12)
- David Vavruška (2012–13)
- Jan Baránek (2013–16)
- Roman Skuhravý (2016–2018)
- Ivan Kopecký (2018–2019)
- Josef Dvorník (2019)
- Jiří Balcárek (2019–2020)
- Radoslav Kováč (2020–2021)
- Roman West (2021–2022)
- Peter Hlinka (2023)
- Miloslav Brožek (2023–2024)
- Tomáš Zápotočný (2024–2025)
- Roman Nádvorník (2025–2026)
- Jan Navrátil (2026)
- Svatopluk Habanec (2026)
- Ondřej Smetana (2026–present)

== History in domestic competitions ==
- 1993–1995 Czech 2. Liga
- 1995–2000 Czech First League
- 2000–2001 Czech 2. Liga
- 2001–2002 Czech First League
- 2002–2003 Czech 2. Liga
- 2003–2005 Czech First League
- 2005–2006 Krajský přebor
- 2006–2010 Czech 2. Liga
- 2010–2011 Moravian-Silesian Football League
- 2011–2013 Czech National Football League
- 2013–2014 Moravian-Silesian Football League
- 2014–2018 Czech National Football League
- 2018–2021 Czech First League
- 2021– Czech National Football League

- Seasons spent at Level 1 of the football league system: 11
- Seasons spent at Level 2 of the football league system: 18
- Seasons spent at Level 3 of the football league system: 2
- Seasons spent at Level 4 of the football league system: 0

=== Czech Republic ===
Season	League	Placed	Pld	W	D	L	GF	GA	GD	Pts	Cup
1993–94	2. liga	3rd	30	16	9	5	43	21	+22	41	Round of 64
1994–95	2. liga	2nd	34	18	6	10	77	45	+32	60	Round of 32
1995–96	1. liga	6th	30	13	7	10	40	34	+6	46	Quarter-finals
1996–97	1. liga	9th	30	10	10	10	34	35	–1	40	Round of 16
1997–98	1. liga	12th	30	8	10	12	33	37	–4	34	Round of 16
1998–99	1. liga	14th	30	8	8	14	40	54	–14	32	Quarter-finals
1999–00	1. liga	15th	30	6	10	14	31	39	–8	28	Round of 16
2000–01	2. liga	2nd	30	17	9	4	57	20	+37	60	Round of 16
2001–02	1. liga	16th	30	5	3	22	23	58	–35	18	Round of 64
2002–03	2. liga	2nd	30	17	9	4	51	26	+25	60	First round
2003–04	1. liga	12th	30	8	7	15	34	55	–21	31	Round of 16
2004–05	1. liga	16th	30	5	9	16	25	42	–17	24 (Note: Excluding the six point deduction for corruption.)	Round of 32
2005–06	5. liga	1st	30	28	2	0	105	11	+94	86	First round
2006–07	2. liga	4th	30	15	8	7	47	28	+19	53	Round of 16
2007–08	2. liga	3rd	30	15	5	10	46	31	+15	50	Round of 64
2008–09	2. liga	7th	30	12	7	11	44	38	+6	43	Round of 32
2009–10	2. liga	15th	30	6	11	13	30	37	–7	29	Round of 32
2010–11	3. liga	1st	28	21	6	1	62	13	+49	69	Round of 16
2011–12	2. liga	8th	30	11	8	11	46	36	+10	41	Round of 32
2012–13	2. liga	16th	30	5	6	19	34	60	–26	21	Round of 64
2013–14	3. liga	1st	30	18	8	4	48	21	+27	62	Round of 64
2014–15	2. liga	9th	30	11	9	10	36	35	+1	42	Round of 16
2015–16	2. liga	11th	28	6	14	8	34	37	–3	32	Round of 32
2016–17	2. liga	3rd	30	19	6	5	61	33	+28	63	Runners-up
2017–18	2. liga	1st	30	18	9	3	76	33	+43	63	Round of 32
2018–19	1. liga	12th	35	12	7	16	47	57	−10	43	Round of 16
2019–20	1. liga	15th	33	5	10	18	17	50	–33	25	Round of 16
2020–21	1. liga	18th	34	3	8	23	23	71	–48	17	Round of 32
2021–22	2. liga	3rd	30	14	9	7	47	33	+14	51	Round of 32
2022–23	2. liga	13th	30	8	10	12	26	29	–3	34	Round of 64
2023–24	2. liga	6th	30	11	7	12	36	36	0	40	Semi-finals
2024–25	2. liga	13th	30	9	9	12	29	39	–10	36	Round of 32
2025–26	2. liga	7th	30	11	11	8	42	31	+11	44	First round

== Honours ==
- Czech National Football League (second tier)
  - Champions (1): 2017–18
- Moravian–Silesian Football League (third tier)
  - Champions (2): 2010–11, 2013–14
- Czech Cup:
  - Runners-up (1): 2016–17

== Club records ==
=== Czech First League records ===
- Best position: 6th (1995–96)
- Worst position: 18th (2020–21)
- Biggest home win: Opava 5–0 Příbram (2018–19)
- Biggest away win: Slovácko 0–2 Opava (2018–19)
- Biggest home defeat: Opava 0–6 Slavia Prague (2020–21)
- Biggest away defeat: Jablonec 5–0 Opava (2001–02), Mladá Boleslav 6–1 Opava (2018–19)
