= TJ Tatran Jakubčovice =

Tatran Jakubčovice
- Full name: TJ Tatran Jakubčovice n/O, z.s.
- Founded: 1952
- Ground: Jakubčovice nad Odrou
- Capacity: 500
- Chairman: Josef Hájek
- Manager: Pavel Hadaščok
- League: Moravskoslezský kraj, Krajský přebor
- 2023–24: 11th
Home colours

TJ Tatran Jakubčovice is a Czech football club. In 2006–2007, it played in the Czech 2. Liga. After finishing 11th in the table, it was swapped by FK Dukla Prague, and Jakubčovice Fotbal began the next season in a lower division.

After the 2009–10 season, when the team finished second in Czech Fourth Division's Divize E and was due for promotion to the MSFL, the club was relegated to the 7th tier (1.B třída sk. D – Moravskoslezský kraj).

== Honours ==
- Moravian–Silesian Football League (third tier)
  - Champions 2005–06
