= 2009–10 SK Slavia Prague season =

Slavia Prague
2009–10 season
- Manager: Karel Jarolím (until March); František Cipro (from March)
- Stadium: Synot Tip Arena
- Czech First League: 7th
- Czech Cup: Semi-finals
- UEFA Champions League: Third qualifying round
- UEFA Europa League: Group stage
Home colours	Away colours

The 2009–10 season was Sports Club Slavia Prague's 17th consecutive season in the Czech First League and 117th year in existence as a football club. In addition to the domestic league, Slavia Prague participated in this season's editions of the Czech Cup, UEFA Champions League and UEFA Europa League.

== Squad ==
Note: Flags indicate national team as defined under FIFA eligibility rules; some limited exceptions apply. Players may hold more than one non-FIFA nationality.

No.	Pos.	Nation	Player
2	DF	CZE	Petr Trapp
3	DF	CZE	Milan Kopic
4	DF	CZE	David Hubáček
5	MF	FRA	Kevin Lafrance
6	MF	TUN	Hocine Ragued
7	FW	CZE	Stanislav Vlček
8	FW	CZE	Petr Janda
9	FW	CZE	Adam Hloušek
10	MF	CZE	Jan Kysela
11	FW	CZE	Stanislav Tecl
12	DF	CZE	Jaroslav Starý
13	MF	CZE	Milan Černý
14	FW	CZE	Zdeněk Šenkeřík
15	DF	CZE	Petr Mareš
16	DF	CZE	Jan Mikula

No.	Pos.	Nation	Player
18	FW	MKD	Riste Naumov
19	DF	SVK	Matej Krajčík
20	MF	CZE	Štěpán Koreš
21	FW	MKD	Mirko Ivanovski
22	DF	CZE	Benjamin Vomáčka
24	MF	BLR	Vitali Trubila
25	DF	CZE	Jan Hošek
26	MF	CZE	Jaroslav Černý
27	MF	SVK	Peter Grajciar
28	GK	CZE	Martin Vaniak
29	DF	CZE	Josef Kaufman
31	GK	LAT	Deniss Romanovs
32	MF	CZE	Ondřej Vaněk
33	MF	CZE	Filip Duranski
34	GK	SVK	Štefan Senecký

== Competitions ==
=== Overview ===
Competition	First match	Last match	Starting round	Final position	Record							
Competition	First match	Last match	Starting round	Final position	Pld	W	D	L	GF	GA	GD	Win %
Czech First League	25 July 2009	15 May 2010	Matchday 1	7th	30	11	8	11	37	35	+2	36.67
Czech Cup	3 September 2009	28 April 2010	Second round	Semi-finals	8	5	1	2	11	6	+5	62.50
UEFA Champions League	29 July 2009	5 August 2009	Third qualifying round	Third qualifying round	2	0	2	0	1	1	+0	0.00
UEFA Europa League	20 August 2009	17 December 2009	Group stage	Group stage	8	1	3	4	9	15	−6	12.50
Total					48	17	14	17	58	57	+1	35.42

Source: Competitions

=== Czech First League ===
==== League table ====
Pos	Team	Pld	W	D	L	GF	GA	GD	Pts	Qualification or relegation
5	Viktoria Plzeň	30	12	12	6	42	33	+9	48	Qualification for Europa League third qualifying round (Note: Viktoria Plzeň won the 2009–10 Czech Cup and qualified for the third qualifying round of the UEFA Europa League.)
6	Sigma Olomouc	30	14	5	11	49	36	+13	47	
7	Slavia Prague	30	11	8	11	37	35	+2	41	
8	Mladá Boleslav	30	11	6	13	47	41	+6	39	
9	Slovan Liberec	30	10	7	13	34	39	−5	37	

Source: Fortuna liga
Rules for classification: 1) points; 2) goal difference; 3) number of goals scored.

==== Results summary ====
Overall								Home						Away					
Pld	W	D	L	GF	GA	GD	Pts	W	D	L	GF	GA	GD	W	D	L	GF	GA	GD
30	11	8	11	37	35	+2	41	7	4	4	23	14	+9	4	4	7	14	21	−7

Source: Competitions

==== Matches ====
25 July 2009 1	Slavia Prague	1–1	Mladá Boleslav	Prague
	Jarolím 79'	Report	Mendy 68'	Stadium: Synot Tip Arena; Attendance: 13,200; Referee: Jiří Adam

2 August 2009 2	Brno	2–0	Slavia Prague	Brno
	Rabušic 7'; Došek 12'	Report		Stadium: Městský fotbalový stadion Srbská; Attendance: 6,034; Referee: Pavel Franěk

9 August 2009 3	Slavia Prague	3–1	Bohemians Prague (Střížkov)	Prague
	Šenkeřík 3', 27', 75'	Report	Očovan 63'	Stadium: Synot Tip Arena; Attendance: 9,485; Referee: Tomáš Kocourek

15 August 2009 4	Dynamo České Budějovice	0–1	Slavia Prague	České Budějovice
		Report	J. Černý 22'	Stadium: Stadion Střelecký ostrov Attendance: 4,812; Referee: Radek Kocián

23 August 2009 5	Teplice	1–1	Slavia Prague	Teplice
	Stožický 17'	Report	J. Černý 41'	Stadium: Na Stínadlech; Attendance: 10,690; Referee: Jiří Jech

31 August 2009 6	Slavia Prague	3–0	Slovácko	Prague
	Šenkeřík 45'; Čelůstka 48'; Kubáň 85' (o.g.)	Report		Stadium: Synot Tip Arena; Attendance: 12,382; Referee: Pavel Franěk

12 September 2009 7	Slovan Liberec	1–1	Slavia Prague	Liberec
	Selassie 18'	Report	Belaïd 10'	Stadium: Stadion u Nisy; Attendance: 6,031; Referee: Pavel Královec

21 September 2009 8	Slavia Prague	3–1	Baník Ostrava	Prague
	Hloušek 44', 65'; Grajciar 89'	Report	Lukeš 35'	Stadium: Synot Tip Arena; Attendance: 12,092; Referee: Jiří Adam

26 September 2009 9	Bohemians 1905	1–1	Slavia Prague	Prague
	Štohanzl 69'	Report	Belaïd 63' (pen.)	Stadium: Ďolíček; Attendance: 7,500; Referee: Dagmar Damková

5 October 2009 10	Slavia Prague	0–1	Sparta Prague	Prague
	Šmicer (yellow card) 90'	Report	Bony 28'; Kadlec (yellow card) 35'; Hoheneder (yellow card) 52'; Holenda (yellow card) 84'; Kušnír (yellow card) 90'	Stadium: Synot Tip Arena; Attendance: 19,370; Referee: Jiří Jech

18 October 2009 11	Kladno	0–2	Slavia Prague	Kladno
		Report	Naumov 14', 78'	Stadium: Stadion Františka Kloze; Attendance: 2,680; Referee: Jaroslav Bílek

26 October 2009 12	Slavia Prague	1–2	Sigma Olomouc	Prague
	Hloušek 31'	Report	Hořava 3'; Šultes 29'	Stadium: Synot Tip Arena; Attendance: 9,159; Referee: Libor Kovařík

31 October 2009 13	Příbram	1–0	Slavia Prague	Příbram
	Plašil 75'	Report		Stadium: Na Litavce; Attendance: 3,962; Referee: Drahoslav Drábek

9 November 2009 14	Slavia Prague	0–0	Viktoria Plzeň	Prague
	Skácel (yellow card) 62'; Suchý (yellow card) 85'; Hloušek (yellow card) 90'	Report	Rezek (yellow card) 41'; Horváth (yellow card) 53'; Limberský (yellow card) 58'; Daněk (yellow card) 77'	Stadium: Synot Tip Arena; Attendance: 8,491; Referee: Tomáš Adámek

21 November 2009 15	Jablonec	1–1	Slavia Prague	Jablonec nad Nisou
	Čížek 3'; Lafata (yellow card) 39'	Report	Skácel (yellow card) 21'; Krajčík (yellow card) 28'; Naumov 31'	Stadium: Stadion Střelnice; Attendance: 4,812; Referee: Jiří Adam

29 November 2009 16	Slavia Prague	3–1	Brno	Prague
	Skácel 31', 42', 48', (yellow card) 36'	Report	Križko (yellow card) 3'; Polách 5'; Jílek (yellow card) 10'	Stadium: Synot Tip Arena; Attendance: 7,629; Referee: Jan Jílek

27 February 2010 17	Bohemians Prague (Střížkov)	0–1	Slavia Prague	Prague
		Report	Grajciar 25'	Stadium: Stadion Evžena Rošického; Attendance: 4,568; Referee: Radek Příhoda

8 March 2010 18	Slavia Prague	3–2	Dynamo České Budějovice	Prague
	Vlček 2', 44'; Janda 33'	Report	Černák 26'; Ondrášek 39'	Stadium: Synot Tip Arena; Attendance: 7,334; Referee: Pavel Franěk

13 March 2010 19	Slavia Prague	0–0	Teplice	Prague
		Report		Stadium: Synot Tip Arena; Attendance: 8,701; Referee: Miroslav Zelinka

22 March 2010 20	Slovácko	3–1	Slavia Prague	Uherské Hradiště
	Fujerik 14'; Nestorovski 25'; Ondřejka 73'	Report	Trapp 8'	Stadium: Městský fotbalový stadion Miroslava Valenty; Attendance: 6,100; Referee: Jan Jílek

25 March 2010 21	Slavia Prague	0–2	Slovan Liberec	Prague
		Report	Kerić 19'; Vulin 25'	Stadium: Synot Tip Arena; Attendance: 7,418; Referee: Drahoslav Drábek

29 March 2010 22	Baník Ostrava	3–1	Slavia Prague	Ostrava
	Vydra 7'; Bolf 21'; Mičola 64'	Report	Trapp 34'	Stadium: Bazaly; Attendance: 10,055; Referee: Jiří Jech

5 April 2010 23	Slavia Prague	3–0	Bohemians 1905	Prague
	Grajciar 71', 79'; Trapp 83'	Report		Stadium: Synot Tip Arena; Attendance: 13,441; Referee: Tomáš Adámek

12 April 2010 24	Sparta Prague	1–0	Slavia Prague	Prague
	Řepka (yellow card) 21'; Sionko (yellow card) 25', (goal) 39'; Bony (yellow card) 82'	Report	Ragued (yellow card) 71'; Krajčík (yellow card) 76'	Stadium: Generali Arena; Attendance: 18,639; Referee: Pavel Franěk

18 April 2010 25	Slavia Prague	0–0	Kladno	Prague
		Report		Stadium: Synot Tip Arena; Attendance: 8,633; Referee: Libor Kovařík

25 April 2010 26	Sigma Olomouc	3–1	Slavia Prague	Olomouc
	Šultes 64'; Hubník 70', 80'	Report	Ivanovski 24'	Stadium: Andrův stadion Attendance: 6,037; Referee: Jaroslav Bílek

2 May 2010 27	Slavia Prague	3–0	Příbram	Prague
	Krajčík 54'; Dens 57'; Zákostelský 62'	Report		Stadium: Synot Tip Arena; Attendance: 4,799; Referee: Karel Hrubeš

5 May 2010 28	Viktoria Plzeň	4–2	Slavia Prague	Plzeň
	Kolář 23'; Horváth (yellow card) 39', (goal) 67'; Rezek 50'; Střihavka 60'; Limberský (yellow card) 78'	Report	Ivanovski 5', 35'; Trapp (yellow card) 37'	Stadium: Stadion města Plzně; Attendance: 3,953; Referee: Radek Příhoda

8 May 2010 29	Slavia Prague	0–3	Jablonec	Prague
	Hubáček (yellow card) 71'; M. Černý (yellow card) 75'	Report	Loučka (yellow card) 19'; Pekhart 26'; Kovařík (yellow card) 29'; Drsek (yellow card) 34'; Jarolím (yellow card) 38', (goal) 39'; Lafata 75'	Stadium: Synot Tip Arena; Attendance: 4,605; Referee: Dagmar Damková

15 May 2010 30	Mladá Boleslav	0–1	Slavia Prague	Mladá Boleslav
		Report	J. Černý 51' (pen.)	Stadium: Městský stadion Attendance: 2,820; Referee: Libor Kovařík

=== Czech Cup ===
3 September 2009 Second round	Česká Lípa	2–4	Slavia Prague	Česká Lípa
17:00 CEST (UTC+2)		Report		Stadium: Městský stadion u Ploučnice

8 October 2009 Third round	Karlovy Vary	1–1 (a.e.t.) (4–5 p)	Slavia Prague	Karlovy Vary
16:00 CEST (UTC+2)		Report		Stadium: Stadion Karlovy Vary-Dvory
Note: Slavia Prague won 5–4 on penalties.

==== Fourth round ====
14 November 2009 First leg	Karviná	1–0	Slavia Prague	Karviná
14:00 CEST (UTC+2)		Report		Stadium: Městský stadion

25 November 2009 Second leg	Slavia Prague	2–0 (2–1 agg.)	Karviná	Prague
17:30 CEST (UTC+2)		Report		Stadium: Synot Tip Arena
Note: Slavia Prague won 2–1 on aggregate.

==== Quarter-finals ====
1 April 2010 First leg	Slavia Prague	1–0	Sparta Prague	Prague
19:00 CEST (UTC+2)	M. Černý 15'; Hubáček (yellow card) 37'	Report	Bony (yellow card) 10'; Kušnír (yellow card) 40'	Stadium: Synot Tip Arena; Referee: Dagmar Damková

15 April 2010 Second leg	Sparta Prague	0–1 (0–2 agg.)	Slavia Prague	Prague
20:00 CEST (UTC+2)	Sionko (yellow card) 38'; Kušnír (yellow card) 43'; Řepka (yellow card) 60'	Report	J. Černý 8' (pen.), (yellow card) 40'; Kopic (yellow card) 49'	Stadium: Generali Arena; Referee: Jiří Adam
Note: Slavia Prague won 2–0 on aggregate.

==== Semi-finals ====
21 April 2010 First leg	Jablonec	1–0	Slavia Prague	Jablonec nad Nisou
17:00 CEST (UTC+2)	Krejčí (yellow card) 72'; Jarolím 90' (pen.)	Report	Trapp (yellow card) 40'; Ivanovski (yellow card) 59'; M. Černý (yellow card) 61'	Stadium: Stadion Střelnice; Referee: Drahoslav Drábek

28 April 2010 Second leg	Slavia Prague	2–1 (2–2 (a) agg.)	Jablonec	Prague
19:15 CEST (UTC+2)	J. Černý 57'; Krajčík (yellow card) 68'; Trapp 88'	Report	Lafata 38', (yellow card) 53'; Drsek (yellow card) 55'; Eliáš (red card) 56'	Stadium: Synot Tip Arena; Referee: Robert Hajek
Note: 2–2 on aggregate. Jablonec won on away goals.

=== UEFA Champions League ===
==== Third qualifying round ====
29 July 2009 First leg	Sheriff Tiraspol (Moldova)	0–0	(Czech Republic) Slavia Prague	Tiraspol, Moldova
20:00 EEST (UTC+3)	Jymmy (yellow card) 78'	Report		Stadium: Sheriff Stadium; Attendance: 10,000; Referee: Alan Kelly (Ireland)

5 August 2009 Second leg	Slavia Prague (Czech Republic)	1–1 (1–1 (a) agg.)	(Moldova) Sheriff Tiraspol	Prague, Czech Republic
20:00 CEST (UTC+2)	Hloušek 15'; Suchý (yellow card) 84'; J. Černý (yellow card) 89'	Report	Mamah (yellow card) 44'; Balima (yellow card) 71'; Nadson 90+3'	Stadium: Synot Tip Arena; Attendance: 13,483; Referee: Gianluca Rocchi (Italy)
Note: 1–1 on aggregate. Sheriff Tiraspol won on away goals.

=== UEFA Europa League ===
==== Play-off round ====
20 August 2009 First leg	Slavia Prague (Czech Republic)	3–0	(Serbia) Red Star Belgrade	Prague, Czech Republic
20:00 CEST (UTC+2)	Šenkeřík (yellow card) 18', (goal) 34', 65'; Vlček 81'	Report	Ninkov (yellow card) 61'	Stadium: Synot Tip Arena; Attendance: 12,625; Referee: Paul Allaerts (Belgium)

27 August 2009 First leg	Red Star Belgrade (Serbia)	2–1 (2–4 agg.)	(Czech Republic) Slavia Prague	Belgrade, Serbia
20:30 CEST (UTC+2)	Bogdanović 23' (pen.); Perović 45'; Lekić (yellow card) 55'; Savić (yellow card) 58'; Cadú (yellow card) 87'	Report	Hubáček (yellow card) 45+1'; Vlček 63'; Trapp (yellow card) 87'	Stadium: Stadion Crvena Zvezda; Attendance: 30,100; Referee: Thorsten Kinhöfer (Germany)
Note: Slavia Prague won 4–2 on aggregate.

==== Group stage ====
Pos	Team	Pld	W	D	L	GF	GA	GD	Pts	Qualification	VAL	LIL	GEN	SLV
1	(Spain) Valencia	6	3	3	0	12	8	+4	12	Advance to knockout phase	—	3–1	3–2	1–1
2	(France) Lille	6	3	1	2	15	9	+6	10	Advance to knockout phase	1–1	—	3–0	3–1
3	(Italy) Genoa	6	2	1	3	8	10	−2	7		1–2	3–2	—	2–0
4	(Czech Republic) Slavia Prague	6	0	3	3	5	13	−8	3		2–2	1–5	0–0	—

Source: Soccerway

17 September 2009 1	Genoa (Italy)	2–0	(Czech Republic) Slavia Prague	Genoa, Italy
19:00 CEST (UTC+2)	Zapater 4'; Sculli 39'	Report		Stadium: Stadio Luigi Ferraris; Attendance: 17,356; Referee: Jorge Sousa (Portugal)

1 October 2009 2	Slavia Prague (Czech Republic)	1–5	(France) Lille	Prague, Czech Republic
21:05 CEST (UTC+2)	Belaïd 6' (pen.); Volešák (yellow card) 58'	Report	Butelle (yellow card) 5'; Suchý 47' (o.g.); Dumont (yellow card) 50'; Frau 71'; Gervinho 85', 90+1'; Souquet 88'	Stadium: Synot Tip Arena; Attendance: 9,158; Referee: Robert Schörgenhofer (Austria)

22 October 2009 3	Valencia (Spain)	1–1	(Czech Republic) Slavia Prague	Valencia, Spain
21:05 CEST (UTC+2)	Mathieu (yellow card) 34'; D. Navarro 63'; Villa (red card) 85'	Report	Naumov 28'; Ragued (yellow card) 58' (yellow-red card) 76'; Hloušek (yellow card) 66'; Trapp (yellow card) 76'; Vomáčka (yellow card) 86'	Stadium: Mestalla; Attendance: 20,632; Referee: Serge Gumienny (Belgium)

5 November 2009 4	Slavia Prague (Czech Republic)	2–2	(Spain) Valencia	Prague, Czech Republic
19:00 CET (UTC+1)	Šenkeřík (yellow card) 45+2' (yellow-red card) 48'; Trapp (yellow card) 69'; Janda 79'; Grajciar 82', (yellow card) 84'; Šmicer (yellow card) 90+2'	Report	Joaquín 22' (pen.); Maduro 47'; Pablo Hernández (yellow card) 60'; Mathieu (yellow card) 62'; Del Horno (yellow card) 84'; Baraja (yellow card) 88' (yellow-red card) 90+4'	Stadium: Synot Tip Arena; Attendance: 10,624; Referee: Svein Oddvar Moen (Norway)

2 December 2009 5	Slavia Prague (Czech Republic)	0–0	(Italy) Genoa	Prague, Czech Republic
21:05 CET (UTC+1)		Report	Palladino (yellow card) 87'	Stadium: Synot Tip Arena; Attendance: 11,799; Referee: Knut Kircher (Germany)

17 December 2009 6	Lille (France)	3–1	(Czech Republic) Slavia Prague	Villeneuve d'Ascq, France
19:00 CET (UTC+1)	Cabaye 25'; Gervinho 40'; Balmont (yellow card) 73'; Obraniak 80'	Report	Hubáček (yellow card) 45'; Janda (yellow card) 51'; Vlček 56'	Stadium: Stadium Lille-Metropole; Attendance: 15,358; Referee: Hannes Kaasik (Estonia)
