= List of Czech Republic international footballers =

This is a list of Czech international footballers, comprising all players to have played for the Czech Republic national football team since its formation in 1994.

== List ==
Name	Date of birth	Caps (Note: Only matches listed as full internationals by FIFA are included. This means caps gained in a February 2000 friendly against a Hong Kong XI are excluded.)	Goals	First cap	Opponent	Last cap	Opponent	Ref
Martin Frýdek	9 March 1969	29	4	23 February 1994	Turkey	15 December 1997	Uruguay	
Miroslav Kadlec	22 June 1964	26	1	23 February 1994	Turkey	8 June 1997	Spain	
Pavel Kuka	19 July 1968	63	22	23 February 1994	Turkey	5 September 2001	Malta	
Radoslav Látal	1 June 1970	47	1	23 February 1994	Turkey	28 February 2001	Macedonia	
Jiří Němec	15 May 1966	64	1	23 February 1994	Turkey	28 March 2001	Denmark	
Václav Němeček	25 January 1967	20	1	23 February 1994	Turkey	26 June 1996	France	
Jiří Novotný	7 April 1970	21	2	23 February 1994	Turkey	27 March 2002	Wales	
Karel Poborský	30 March 1972	118	8	23 February 1994	Turkey	22 June 2006	Italy	
Tomáš Řepka	2 January 1974	45	1	23 February 1994	Turkey	10 November 2001	Belgium	
Petr Samec	14 February 1964	9	2	23 February 1994	Turkey	16 August 1995	Norway	
Horst Siegl	15 February 1969	19	7	23 February 1994	Turkey	27 May 1998	South Korea	
Daniel Šmejkal	28 August 1970	10	3	23 February 1994	Turkey	8 May 1995	Slovenia	
Jan Stejskal	15 January 1962	2	0	23 February 1994	Turkey	25 May 1994	Lithuania	
Jan Suchopárek	23 September 1969	48	4	23 February 1994	Turkey	23 February 2000	Ireland	
Roman Vonášek	8 July 1968	8	0	23 February 1994	Turkey	9 February 1999	Belgium	
Petr Kouba	28 January 1969	26	0	20 April 1994	Switzerland	18 November 1998	England	
Luboš Kubík	20 January 1964	17	3	20 April 1994	Switzerland	26 February 1997	Belarus	
Marek Poštulka	21 June 1970	2	1	25 May 1994	Lithuania	26 March 1996	Turkey	
Tomáš Skuhravý	9 July 1965	6	3	25 May 1994	Lithuania	6 September 1995	Norway	
Martin Kotůlek	11 September 1969	7	0	5 June 1994	Ireland	18 November 1998	England	
Pavel Nedvěd	30 August 1972	91	18	5 June 1994	Ireland	16 August 2006	Serbia	
Patrik Berger	10 November 1973	42	18	17 August 1994	France	15 August 2001	South Korea	
Petr Veselý	7 June 1971	2	0	6 September 1994	Malta	8 February 2000	Mexico	
Ivan Hašek	6 September 1963	1	0	12 October 1994	Malta	12 October 1994	Malta	
Pavel Srníček	10 March 1968	49	0	12 October 1994	Malta	14 November 2001	Belgium	
Michal Bílek	13 April 1965	3	0	16 November 1994	Netherlands	29 March 1995	Belarus	
Pavel Hapal	27 July 1969	10	0	16 November 1994	Netherlands	24 April 1996	Ireland	
Günter Bittengel	14 July 1966	1	0	8 March 1995	Finland	8 March 1995	Finland	
Petr Gabriel	17 May 1973	10	1	8 March 1995	Finland	16 June 2000	France	
Tomáš Galásek	15 January 1973	69	1	8 March 1995	Finland	15 June 2008	Turkey	
René Wagner	31 October 1972	11	3	8 March 1995	Finland	25 April 2001	Belgium	
Radek Bejbl	27 August 1972	56	3	8 May 1995	Slovakia	6 June 2001	Northern Ireland	
Radek Drulák	12 January 1962	16	6	8 May 1995	Slovakia	26 February 1997	Belarus	
Michal Horňák	28 April 1970	38	1	8 May 1995	Slovakia	9 October 1999	Faroe Islands	
Jiří Lerch	17 October 1971	3	0	8 May 1995	Slovakia	26 February 1997	Belarus	
Radim Nečas	26 August 1969	4	0	8 May 1995	Slovakia	8 February 2000	Mexico	
Jiří Vávra	6 March 1975	1	0	8 May 1995	Slovakia	8 May 1995	Slovakia	
Vratislav Lokvenc	27 September 1973	74	14	6 September 1995	Norway	17 June 2006	Ghana	
Vladimír Šmicer	24 May 1973	80	27	15 November 1995	Luxembourg	16 November 2005	Norway	
Miroslav Baranek	10 November 1973	17	5	13 December 1995	Kuwait	13 February 2002	Cyprus	
Radovan Hromádko	16 May 1969	2	0	13 December 1995	Kuwait	4 September 1996	Iceland	
Luboš Kozel	16 March 1971	9	1	13 December 1995	Kuwait	22 April 1998	Slovenia	
Edvard Lasota	17 March 1971	15	2	13 December 1995	Kuwait	27 May 1998	South Korea	
Ladislav Maier	4 January 1966	7	0	13 December 1995	Kuwait	28 February 2001	Macedonia	
Jaromír Navrátil	20 February 1963	2	0	13 December 1995	Kuwait	26 March 1996	Turkey	
Josef Obajdin	7 November 1970	1	0	13 December 1995	Kuwait	13 December 1995	Kuwait	
Karel Rada	2 March 1971	43	4	13 December 1995	Kuwait	2 June 2001	Denmark	
Robert Vágner	12 May 1974	2	0	13 December 1995	Kuwait	9 February 1999	Belgium	
Milan Kerbr	9 June 1967	2	0	24 April 1996	Ireland	29 May 1996	Austria	
Pavel Novotný	14 September 1973	2	0	26 June 1996	France	9 February 1999	Belgium	
Richard Dostálek	26 April 1974	5	0	4 September 1996	Iceland	12 February 2003	France	
Petr Křivánek	18 March 1970	1	0	4 September 1996	Iceland	4 September 1996	Iceland	
Zdeněk Svoboda	20 May 1972	9	0	4 September 1996	Iceland	21 December 1997	Uruguay	
Pavel Verbíř	13 November 1972	10	2	4 September 1996	Iceland	16 August 2000	Slovenia	
Martin Čížek	9 June 1974	18	0	4 September 1996	Nigeria	29 March 2000	Australia	
Martin Hašek	11 October 1969	14	0	4 September 1996	Nigeria	14 November 2001	Belgium	
Oldřich Machala	4 August 1963	1	0	4 September 1996	Nigeria	4 September 1996	Nigeria	
Luděk Mikloško	9 December 1961	2	0	4 September 1996	Nigeria	2 April 1997	Yugoslavia	
Radek Slončík	29 May 1973	17	0	4 September 1996	Nigeria	8 February 2000	Mexico	
Marek Zúbek	5 August 1975	3	0	4 September 1996	Nigeria	26 February 1997	Belarus	
Petr Vlček	18 October 1973	18	0	24 August 1997	Slovakia	11 November 2000	Malta	
Karel Vácha	2 August 1970	1	0	6 September 1997	Faroe Islands	6 September 1997	Faroe Islands	
Ivo Ulich	9 September 1974	8	1	6 September 1997	Malta	26 April 2000	Israel	
Milan Fukal	16 May 1975	19	2	21 December 1997	Uruguay	30 April 2003	Turkey	
Tomáš Poštulka	2 February 1974	7	0	25 March 1998	Ireland	14 February 1998	Estonia	
Tomáš Votava	1 February 1974	13	0	25 March 1998	Ireland	14 February 1998	Northern Ireland	
Martin Lukeš	17 November 1978	2	2	22 April 1998	Slovenia	19 August 1998	Denmark	
Pavel Horváth	22 April 1975	19	0	9 February 1999	Belgium	17 April 2002	Greece	
Jan Koller	30 March 1973	91	55	9 February 1999	Belgium	5 September 2009	Slovakia	
Marek Nikl	20 February 1976	5	0	28 April 1999	Poland	16 August 2000	Slovenia	
Libor Sionko	1 February 1977	41	8	28 April 1999	Poland	25 May 2010	USA	
Jan Polák	14 March 1981	57	7	28 April 1999	Poland	29 March 2011	Liechtenstein	
Roman Týce	7 May 1977	25	1	18 August 1999	Switzerland	30 March 2005	Andorra	
Radek Černý	18 February 1976	3	0	8 February 2000	Mexico	20 November 2002	Sweden	
Marek Jankulovski	9 May 1977	77	11	8 February 2000	Mexico	14 October 2009	Northern Ireland	
Michal Kolomazník	20 July 1976	3	1	8 February 2000	Mexico	20 November 2002	Sweden	
Erich Brabec	24 February 1977	1	0	8 February 2000	Mexico	8 February 2000	Mexico	
Stanislav Vlček	26 February 1976	14	0	8 February 2000	Mexico	20 August 2008	England	
Marek Kincl	3 April 1973	2	0	8 February 2000	Mexico	16 August 2000	Slovenia	
Tomáš Rosický	4 October 1980	105	23	23 February 2000	Ireland	17 June 2016	Croatia	
Jaromír Blažek	29 December 1972	14	0	29 March 2000	Australia	26 March 2008	Denmark	
Lukáš Došek	12 September 1978	4	0	16 August 2000	Slovenia	18 May 2002	Italy	
René Bolf	25 February 1974	34	0	16 August 2000	Slovenia	3 September 2005	Romania	
Marek Heinz	4 August 1977	30	5	16 August 2000	Slovenia	3 September 2005	Denmark	
Jiří Jarošík	27 October 1977	23	0	16 August 2000	Slovenia	12 November 2005	Norway	
Tomáš Ujfaluši	24 March 1978	78	2	28 February 2001	Macedonia	28 March 2009	Slovenia	
Milan Baroš	28 October 1981	93	41	25 April 2001	Belgium	21 June 2012	Portugal	
Petr Johana	1 November 1976	13	0	2 June 2001	Denmark	12 November 2003	Canada	
Zdeněk Grygera	14 May 1980	65	2	15 August 2001	South Korea	14 October 2009	Northern Ireland	
Jan Velkoborský	14 July 1975	2	0	15 August 2001	South Korea	5 September 2001	Malta	
Luděk Stracený	19 April 1977	1	0	15 August 2001	South Korea	15 August 2001	South Korea	
Tomáš Hübschman	4 September 1981	39	0	10 November 2001	Belgium	17 August 2005	Sweden	
Petr Čech	20 May 1982	124	0	12 February 2002	Hungary	21 June 2016	Turkey	
Pavel Mareš	18 January 1976	10	0	12 February 2002	Hungary	3 June 2006	Trinidad and Tobago	
Václav Koloušek	13 April 1976	5	1	12 February 2002	Hungary	6 September 2002	Yugoslavia	
Martin Vaniak	4 October 1970	7	0	12 February 2002	Hungary	31 March 2004	Ireland	
Jiří Štajner	27 May 1976	36	4	12 February 2002	Hungary	6 September 2006	Slovenia	
Adam Petrouš	19 September 1977	4	0	13 February 2002	Cyprus	11 October 2003	Austria	
Antonín Kinský	31 May 1975	5	0	13 February 2002	Cyprus	6 June 2004	Estonia	
Miroslav Holeňák	10 February 1976	3	0	27 March 2002	Wales	21 August 2002	Slovenia	
Štěpán Vachoušek	26 July 1979	23	2	17 April 2002	Greece	1 March 2006	Turkey	
Antonín Mlejnský	17 May 1973	1	0	17 April 2002	Greece	17 April 2002	Greece	
Aleš Pikl	2 April 1975	1	0	17 April 2002	Greece	17 April 2002	Greece	
Tomáš Došek	12 September 1978	3	0	18 May 2002	Italy	30 April 2003	Turkey	
Martin Jiránek	25 May 1979	31	0	21 August 2002	Slovakia	28 March 2007	Cyprus	
Jan Šimák	13 October 1978	1	0	21 August 2002	Slovakia	21 August 2002	Slovakia	
Patrik Gedeon	19 July 1975	3	0	20 November 2002	Sweden	30 April 2003	Turkey	
Petr Voříšek	19 March 1979	4	0	11 October 2003	Austria	31 March 2004	Ireland	
Rudolf Skácel	17 July 1979	7	1	15 November 2003	Canada	22 May 2010	Turkey	
David Rozehnal	5 July 1980	52	0	18 February 2004	Italy	18 November 2009	Azerbaijan	
Václav Drobný	9 September 1980	2	0	18 February 2004	Italy	28 April 2004	Japan	
Jaroslav Plašil	5 January 1982	103	7	31 March 2004	Ireland	21 June 2016	Turkey	
Radoslav Kováč	27 November 1979	30	2	9 October 2004	Romania	1 April 2009	Slovakia	
Tomáš Jun	17 January 1983	10	2	17 November 2004	Macedonia	1 March 2006	Turkey	
Lukáš Zelenka	5 October 1979	3	0	8 June 2005	Macedonia	1 March 2006	Turkey	
Zdeněk Pospěch	14 December 1978	31	2	17 August 2005	Sweden	16 November 2011	Montenegro	
Tomáš Sivok	15 September 1983	64	5	3 September 2005	Romania	10 June 2017	Norway	
David Jarolím	17 May 1979	29	1	8 October 2005	Netherlands	14 October 2009	Northern Ireland	
Karel Piták	28 January 1980	3	0	1 March 2006	Turkey	22 August 2007	Austria	
Roman Bednář	26 March 1983	1	0	16 August 2006	Serbia	16 August 2006	Serbia	
Marek Kulič	11 October 1975	12	3	16 August 2006	Serbia	6 February 2008	Poland	
Tomáš Zápotočný	13 September 1980	4	0	16 August 2006	Serbia	22 August 2007	Austria	
David Lafata	16 September 1981	41	9	2 September 2006	Wales	17 June 2016	Croatia	
Marek Čech	8 April 1976	1	0	15 November 2006	Denmark	15 November 2006	Denmark	
Radek Šírl	20 March 1981	8	0	15 November 2006	Denmark	5 June 2009	Malta	
Daniel Pudil	27 September 1985	35	2	7 February 2007	Belgium	15 November 2016	Denmark	
Marek Matějovský	20 December 1981	15	1	7 February 2007	Belgium	29 March 2011	Liechtenstein	
Martin Fenin	16 April 1987	16	3	22 August 2007	Austria	7 June 2011	Japan	
Michal Kadlec	13 December 1984	67	8	17 November 2007	Slovenia	4 September 2016	Northern Ireland	
Jiří Kladrubský	19 November 1985	2	0	21 November 2007	Cyprus	15 October 2008	Slovenia	
Daniel Zítka	20 June 1975	3	0	21 November 2007	Cyprus	19 November 2008	San Marino	
Marek Střeštík	1 February 1987	1	0	26 March 2008	Denmark	26 March 2008	Denmark	
Václav Svěrkoš	1 November 1983	11	3	27 May 2008	Lithuania	3 March 2010	Scotland	
Michal Papadopulos	14 April 1985	6	0	20 August 2008	England	3 March 2010	Scotland	
Jan Rajnoch	30 September 1981	15	0	20 August 2008	England	11 November 2011	Montenegro	
Miroslav Slepička	10 November 1981	2	0	10 September 2008	Northern Ireland	11 October 2008	Poland	
Tomáš Necid	13 August 1989	44	12	19 November 2008	San Marino	4 September 2016	Northern Ireland	
Jaroslav Drobný	18 October 1979	7	0	11 February 2009	Morocco	14 August 2013	Hungary	
Luboš Hušek	26 January 1984	1	0	11 February 2009	Morocco	11 February 2009	Morocco	
Tomáš Marek	20 April 1981	1	0	11 February 2009	Morocco	11 February 2009	Morocco	
Jaroslav Černý	26 June 1979	2	0	5 June 2009	Malta	22 May 2010	Turkey	
Martin Fillo	7 February 1986	3	0	5 June 2009	Malta	18 November 2009	Azerbaijan	
Tomáš Grigar	1 February 1983	2	0	5 June 2009	Malta	18 November 2009	Azerbaijan	
Roman Hubník	6 June 1984	30	3	5 June 2009	Malta	7 September 2020	Scotland	
Martin Klein	2 July 1984	1	0	5 June 2009	Malta	5 June 2009	Malta	
Daniel Kolář	27 October 1985	29	2	5 June 2009	Malta	21 June 2016	Turkey	
David Limberský	6 October 1983	40	1	5 June 2009	Malta	17 June 2016	Croatia	
Lukáš Magera	17 January 1983	4	0	5 June 2009	Malta	8 October 2010	Scotland	
Jan Šimůnek	20 February 1987	4	0	5 June 2009	Malta	18 November 2009	Azerbaijan	
Zdeněk Zlámal	5 November 1985	1	0	5 June 2009	Malta	5 June 2009	Malta	
Adam Hloušek	20 December 1988	8	0	10 October 2009	Poland	22 March 2017	Lithuania	
Jan Blažek	20 March 1988	3	0	15 November 2009	UAE	3 March 2010	Scotland	
Mario Lička	30 April 1982	3	0	15 November 2009	UAE	17 November 2010	Denmark	
Michal Švec	19 March 1987	2	0	15 November 2009	UAE	18 November 2009	Azerbaijan	
Mario Holek	28 October 1986	8	0	18 November 2009	Azerbaijan	31 March 2015	Slovakia	
Ondřej Kušnír	5 April 1984	4	0	3 March 2010	Scotland	4 June 2011	Peru	
Jan Morávek	1 November 1989	3	0	3 March 2010	Scotland	29 March 2011	Liechtenstein	
Milan Černý	16 March 1988	3	1	22 May 2010	Turkey	11 August 2010	Latvia	
Ondřej Mazuch	15 March 1989	1	0	22 May 2010	Turkey	22 May 2010	Turkey	
Tomáš Pekhart	26 May 1989	26	2	22 May 2010	Turkey	19 November 2022	Turkey	
Marek Suchý	29 March 1988	44	1	7 September 2010	Lithuania	10 September 2019	Montenegro	
Václav Kadlec	20 May 1992	16	4	12 October 2010	Liechtenstein	8 October 2017	San Marino	
Milan Petržela	19 June 1983	19	0	12 October 2010	Liechtenstein	11 October 2016	Azerbaijan	
Michal Hubník	1 June 1983	4	0	17 November 2010	Denmark	7 June 2011	Japan	
Jan Rezek	5 May 1982	21	4	17 November 2010	Denmark	16 October 2012	Bulgaria	
Theodor Gebre Selassie	24 December 1986	54	3	4 June 2011	Peru	26 March 2019	Brazil	
Petr Janda	5 January 1987	2	0	4 June 2011	Peru	7 June 2011	Japan	
Václav Pilař	13 October 1988	22	5	4 June 2011	Peru	12 June 2015	Iceland	
Petr Trapp	6 December 1985	1	0	4 June 2011	Peru	4 June 2011	Peru	
Kamil Vacek	18 May 1987	9	0	4 June 2011	Peru	24 March 2016	Scotland	
Marcel Gecov	1 January 1988	1	0	10 August 2011	Norway	10 August 2011	Norway	
Petr Jiráček	2 March 1986	28	3	3 September 2011	Scotland	3 September 2014	USA	
Jan Laštůvka	7 July 1982	3	0	3 September 2011	Scotland	6 February 2013	Turkey	
František Rajtoral	12 March 1986	14	0	29 February 2012	Ireland	5 March 2014	Norway	
Vladimír Darida	8 August 1990	76	8	26 May 2012	Israel	3 July 2021	Denmark	
Josef Hušbauer	16 March 1990	21	1	15 August 2012	Ukraine	17 November 2019	Bulgaria	
Matěj Vydra	1 May 1992	46	7	8 September 2012	Denmark	16 November 2021	Estonia	
Bořek Dočkal	30 September 1988	43	7	14 November 2012	Slovakia	15 November 2020	Israel	
Tomáš Hořava	29 May 1988	14	4	14 November 2012	Slovakia	10 September 2018	Russia	
Tomáš Kalas	15 May 1993	31	2	14 November 2012	Slovakia	8 October 2021	Wales	
Libor Kozák	30 May 1989	9	2	14 November 2012	Slovakia	10 June 2019	Montenegro	
Ladislav Krejčí	5 July 1992	41	5	14 November 2012	Slovakia	14 October 2019	Northern Ireland	
Martin Latka	28 September 1984	1	0	14 November 2012	Slovakia	14 November 2012	Slovakia	
Michal Ordoš	27 January 1983	2	0	14 November 2012	Slovakia	6 February 2013	Turkey	
Martin Pospíšil	26 June 1991	3	0	14 November 2012	Slovakia	17 November 2015	Poland	
Tomáš Vaclík	29 March 1989	54	0	14 November 2012	Slovakia	20 June 2023	Montenegro	
Stanislav Tecl	1 September 1990	10	0	6 February 2013	Turkey	12 June 2022	Spain	
Václav Procházka	8 May 1984	15	0	14 August 2013	Hungary	17 November 2015	Poland	
Michael Rabušic	17 September 1989	4	0	14 August 2013	Hungary	14 October 2020	Scotland	
Ondřej Vaněk	5 July 1990	8	0	14 August 2013	Hungary	6 September 2015	Latvia	
Ondřej Čelůstka	18 June 1989	33	3	15 November 2013	Canada	11 October 2021	Belarus	
Josef Šural	30 May 1990	20	1	15 November 2013	Canada	16 October 2018	Ukraine	
Pavel Kadeřábek	25 April 1992	48	3	21 May 2014	Finland	27 June 2021	Netherlands	
Lukáš Vácha	13 May 1989	8	0	21 May 2014	Finland	12 June 2015	Iceland	
Jiří Fleišman	2 October 1984	1	0	3 June 2014	Austria	3 June 2014	Austria	
Lukáš Hejda	9 March 1990	1	0	3 June 2014	Austria	3 June 2014	Austria	
Jan Kopic	4 June 1990	25	3	3 June 2014	Austria	16 November 2021	Estonia	
Marek Štěch	28 January 1990	1	0	3 June 2014	Austria	3 June 2014	Austria	
Radim Řezník	20 January 1989	3	0	3 September 2014	USA	14 October 2019	Northern Ireland	
Filip Novák	26 June 1990	28	2	31 March 2015	Slovakia	16 November 2021	Estonia	
Milan Škoda	16 January 1986	19	4	12 June 2015	Iceland	22 March 2019	England	
David Pavelka	18 May 1991	25	1	3 September 2015	Kazakhstan	16 November 2021	Estonia	
Jiří Skalák	12 March 1992	17	0	3 September 2015	Kazakhstan	15 November 2018	Poland	
Ondřej Zahustel	18 June 1991	3	1	13 November 2015	Serbia	31 August 2016	Armenia	
Lukáš Bartošák	3 July 1990	1	0	17 November 2015	Poland	17 November 2015	Poland	
Martin Frýdek	24 March 1992	7	0	24 March 2016	Scotland	26 March 2019	Brazil	
Tomáš Koubek	26 August 1992	12	0	24 March 2016	Scotland	19 November 2022	Turkey	
Lukáš Mareček	17 April 1990	3	0	24 March 2016	Scotland	27 May 2016	Malta	
Jakub Rada	5 May 1987	2	0	24 March 2016	Scotland	29 March 2016	Sweden	
Jakub Brabec	6 August 1992	41	2	29 March 2016	Sweden	17 November 2023	Poland	
Patrik Schick	24 January 1996	42	20	27 May 2016	Malta			
Lukáš Pokorný	5 July 1993	1	0	31 August 2016	Armenia	31 August 2016	Armenia	
Jan Sýkora	29 December 1993	14	4	31 August 2016	Armenia	29 March 2022	Wales	
Lukáš Droppa	22 April 1989	4	0	8 October 2016	Germany	15 November 2016	Denmark	
Jaromír Zmrhal	2 August 1993	23	1	11 October 2016	Azerbaijan	20 June 2023	Montenegro	
Michal Krmenčík	15 March 1993	35	9	11 November 2016	Norway	16 November 2021	Estonia	
Antonín Barák	3 December 1994	43	11	15 November 2016	Denmark			
Petr Mareš	17 January 1991	3	0	15 November 2016	Denmark	5 June 2017	Belgium	
Jiří Pavlenka	14 April 1992	21	0	15 November 2016	Denmark			
Tomáš Souček	27 February 1995	77	14	15 November 2016	Denmark			
Jakub Jankto	19 January 1996	45	4	22 March 2017	Lithuania			
Jan Bořil	11 January 1991	31	0	1 September 2017	Germany			
Jan Kliment	1 September 1993	8	0	1 September 2017	Germany			
Michael Lüftner	14 March 1994	1	0	8 October 2017	San Marino	8 October 2017	San Marino	
Šimon Falta	23 April 1993	2	0	8 November 2017	Iceland	11 November 2017	Qatar	
Robert Hrubý	27 April 1994	2	0	8 November 2017	Iceland	11 November 2017	Qatar	
Stefan Simić	20 January 1995	2	0	11 November 2017	Qatar	14 October 2019	Northern Ireland	
Vladimír Coufal	22 August 1992	51	1	11 November 2017	Qatar			
David Houska	29 June 1993	1	0	11 November 2017	Qatar	11 November 2017	Qatar	
Michal Trávník	17 May 1994	5	0	23 March 2018	Uruguay	15 November 2018	Poland	
Lukáš Masopust	12 February 1993	34	2	26 March 2018	China			
Jakub Jugas	5 May 1992	3	0	1 June 2018	Australia			
Martin Doležal	3 May 1990	6	0	15 November 2018	Poland	2 September 2021	Belarus	
Ondřej Kúdela	26 March 1987	10	0	26 March 2019	Brazil	27 September 2022	Switzerland	
Alex Král	19 May 1998	43	2	26 March 2019	Brazil			
Zdeněk Ondrášek	22 December 1988	7	2	11 October 2019	England	18 November 2020	Slovakia	
Lukáš Kalvach	19 July 1995	5	1	14 October 2019	Northern Ireland			
Petr Ševčík	4 May 1994	16	0	14 November 2019	Kosovo			
Ondřej Kolář	17 October 1994	1	0	17 November 2019	Bulgaria	17 November 2019	Bulgaria	
Adam Hložek	25 July 2002	40	3	4 September 2020	Slovakia			
Lukáš Provod	23 October 1996	28	3	4 September 2020	Slovakia			
Aleš Mandous	21 April 1992	4	0	7 September 2020	Scotland			
Václav Jemelka	23 June 1995	10	0	7 September 2020	Scotland			
Jaroslav Zelený	20 August 1992	12	0	7 September 2020	Scotland			
Tomáš Holeš	31 March 1993	34	2	7 September 2020	Scotland			
Lukáš Budínský	27 March 1992	1	0	7 September 2020	Scotland	7 September 2020	Scotland	
Radim Breite	10 August 1989	1	0	7 September 2020	Scotland	7 September 2020	Scotland	
Marek Havlík	8 July 1995	1	0	7 September 2020	Scotland	7 September 2020	Scotland	
Antonín Růsek	22 March 1999	3	0	7 September 2020	Scotland	19 November 2022	Turkey	
Adam Jánoš	20 July 1992	1	0	7 September 2020	Scotland	7 September 2020	Scotland	
Jakub Pešek	24 June 1993	14	5	7 September 2020	Scotland	12 June 2022	Spain	
Roman Potočný	25 April 1991	1	0	7 September 2020	Scotland	7 September 2020	Scotland	
Tomáš Malínský	25 August 1991	1	0	7 September 2020	Scotland	7 September 2020	Scotland	
David Hovorka	7 August 1993	2	0	7 October 2020	Cyprus	14 October 2020	Scotland	
Tomáš Petrášek	2 March 1992	3	0	7 October 2020	Cyprus	29 March 2022	Wales	
Aleš Matějů	3 June 1996	15	0	7 October 2020	Cyprus	19 November 2022	Turkey	
Tomáš Poznar	27 September 1988	1	0	14 October 2020	Scotland	14 October 2020	Scotland	
Václav Černý	17 October 1997	22	6	11 November 2020	Germany			
