= 2009–10 Valencia CF season =

Valencia CF
2009–10 season
- Head coach: Unai Emery
- Stadium: Mestalla Stadium
- La Liga: 3rd
- Copa del Rey: Round of 16
- UEFA Europa League: Quarter-finals
- Top goalscorer: League: David Villa (21 goals); All: David Villa (28 goals)

The 2009–10 season was Valencia Club de Fútbol's 92nd in existence and the club's 23rd consecutive season in the top flight of Spanish football. It was the second season with Unai Emery as manager.

== Squad ==
Note: Flags indicate national team as defined under FIFA eligibility rules; some limited exceptions apply. Players may hold more than one non-FIFA nationality.

No.	Pos.	Nation	Player
1	GK	ESP	César Sánchez
2	DF	ESP	Bruno
3	MF	NED	Hedwiges Maduro
4	DF	ESP	Alexis
5	DF	ESP	Carlos Marchena (captain)
6	MF	ESP	David Albelda
7	FW	ESP	David Villa
8	MF	ESP	Rubén Baraja
9	FW	SRB	Nikola Žigić
14	MF	ESP	Vicente
15	DF	ESP	David Navarro

No.	Pos.	Nation	Player
16	FW	ESP	Juan Mata
17	MF	ESP	Joaquín
18	MF	POR	Manuel Fernandes
19	MF	ESP	Pablo Hernández
21	MF	ESP	David Silva
22	MF	FRA	Jérémy Mathieu
23	DF	POR	Miguel
24	MF	ARG	Éver Banega
25	GK	ESP	Miguel Ángel Moyà
27	DF	ESP	Ángel Dealbert

== Competitions ==
=== Overview ===
Competition	First match	Last match	Starting round	Final position	Record							
Competition	First match	Last match	Starting round	Final position	Pld	W	D	L	GF	GA	GD	Win %
La Liga	30 August 2009	16 May 2010	Matchday 1	3rd	38	21	8	9	59	40	+19	55.26
Copa del Rey	28 October 2009	13 January 2010	Round of 32	Round of 16	4	1	2	1	6	6	+0	25.00
UEFA Europa League	20 August 2009	8 April 2010	Play-off round	Quarter-finals	14	6	7	1	29	17	+12	42.86
Total					56	28	17	11	94	63	+31	50.00

Source: Competitions

=== La Liga ===
==== League table ====
Pos	Team	Pld	W	D	L	GF	GA	GD	Pts	Qualification or relegation
1	Barcelona (C)	38	31	6	1	98	24	+74	99	Qualification for the Champions League group stage
2	Real Madrid	38	31	3	4	102	35	+67	96	Qualification for the Champions League group stage
3	Valencia	38	21	8	9	59	40	+19	71	Qualification for the Champions League group stage
4	Sevilla	38	19	6	13	65	49	+16	63	Qualification for the Champions League play-off round
5	Mallorca	38	18	8	12	59	44	+15	62 (Note: Mallorca could not qualify for the 2010–11 UEFA Europa League due to being immersed in a creditor contest, a situation against UEFA criteria. Then, Villarreal was invited to replace this spot.)	

Source: LFP and Yahoo! Sport
Rules for classification: 1) points; 2) head-to-head points; 3) head-to-head goal difference; 4) head-to-head goals scored; 5) goal difference; 6) number of goals scored.
(C) Champions

==== Results summary ====
Overall								Home						Away					
Pld	W	D	L	GF	GA	GD	Pts	W	D	L	GF	GA	GD	W	D	L	GF	GA	GD
38	21	8	9	59	40	+19	71	13	5	1	34	12	+22	8	3	8	25	28	−3

Source: Competitions

==== Matches ====
30 August 2009 1	Valencia	2–0	Sevilla	Valencia
19:00 CEST (UTC+2)	Mata 47'; Hernández 80'	Report		Stadium: Mestalla; Referee: Antonio Rubinos Pérez

13 September 2009 2	Valladolid	2–4	Valencia	Valladolid
19:00 CEST (UTC+2)	Nauzet 30'; Manucho 66'	Report	Silva 10'; Villa 34', 55'; Mata 44'	Stadium: Estadio José Zorrilla; Referee: Alberto Undiano Mallenco

20 September 2009 3	Valencia	2–2	Sporting Gijón	Valencia
21:00 CEST (UTC+2)	Villa 24', 60'	Report	Barral 6'; Grégory 86'	Stadium: Mestalla; Referee: David Fernández Borbalán

23 September 2009 4	Getafe	3–1	Valencia	Getafe
22:00 CEST (UTC+2)	Manu 24', 38'; León 69'	Report	Villa 22'	Stadium: Estadio Coliseum; Referee: Bernardino Gonzalez

26 September 2009 5	Valencia	2–2	Atlético Madrid	Valencia
22:00 CEST (UTC+2)	Hernández 25'; Villa 27'	Report	Agüero 7'; Maxi 90'	Stadium: Mestalla; Referee: Carlos Clos Gómez

4 October 2009 6	Racing Santander	0–1	Valencia	Santander
19:00 CEST (UTC+2)		Report	Žigić 61'	Stadium: Estadio El Sardinero; Referee: Mejuto

17 October 2009 7	Valencia	0–0	Barcelona	Valencia
22:00 CEST (UTC+2)		Report		Stadium: Mestalla; Referee: Alfonso Pérez Burrull

25 October 2009 8	Almería	0–3	Valencia	Almería
19:00 CET (UTC+1)		Report	Villa 54'; Hernández 74'; Mata 87'	Stadium: Estadio de los Juegos Mediterráneos; Referee: José Luis González González

1 November 2009 9	Málaga	0–1	Valencia	Málaga
19:00 CET (UTC+1)		Report	Navarro 69'	Stadium: La Rosaleda; Referee: Xavier Estrada Fernández

8 November 2009 10	Valencia	3–1	Zaragoza	Valencia
19:00 CET (UTC+1)	Mata 17'; Villa 40'; Hernández 41'	Report	Aguilar 65'	Stadium: Mestalla; Referee: César Muñiz Fernández

22 November 2009 11	Osasuna	1–3	Valencia	Pamplona
21:00 CET (UTC+1)	Shojaei 68'	Report	Villa 12'; Albelda 20'; Marchena 56'	Stadium: Estadio Reyno de Navarra; Referee: Carlos Velasco Carballo

28 November 2009 12	Valencia	1–1	Mallorca	Valencia
20:00 CET (UTC+1)	Villa 48'	Report	Valero 85' (pen.)	Stadium: Mestalla; Referee: Eduardo Iturralde González

6 December 2009 13	Athletic Bilbao	1–2	Valencia	Bilbao
21:00 CET (UTC+1)	Muniain 58'	Report	Villa 61'; Mathieu 83'	Stadium: San Mamés; Referee: Antonio Rubinos Pérez

12 December 2009 14	Valencia	2–3	Real Madrid	Valencia
22:00 CET (UTC+1)	Villa 59'; Joaquín 80'	Report	Higuaín 54', 65'; Garay 83'	Stadium: Mestalla; Referee: Fernando Teixeira Vitienes

20 December 2009 15	Deportivo La Coruña	0–0	Valencia	A Coruña
21:00 CET (UTC+1)		Report		Stadium: Riazor; Referee: Carlos Delgado

2 January 2010 16	Valencia	1–0	Espanyol	Valencia
18:00 CET (UTC+1)	Žigić 90'	Report		Stadium: Mestalla; Referee: Rafael Ramírez Domínguez

10 January 2010 17	Xerez	1–3	Valencia	Jerez de la Frontera
17:00 CET (UTC+1)	Calvo 25'	Report	Mata 11'; Silva 33'; Marchena 69'	Stadium: Chapín; Referee: Carlos Clos Gómez

17 January 2010 18	Valencia	4–1	Villarreal	Valencia
21:00 CET (UTC+1)	Banega 6', (yellow card) 58'; Villa 28' (pen.), 90'; Bruno (yellow card) 37'; Silva 56', (yellow card) 87'; Navarro (yellow card) 65'; Albelda (yellow card) 71'	Report	Kiko (red card) 27'; Nilmar 61'	Stadium: Mestalla; Referee: Alberto Undiano Mallenco

24 January 2010 19	Tenerife	0–0	Valencia	Santa Cruz de Tenerife
16:00 WET (UTC)		Report		Stadium: Estadio Heliodoro Rodríguez López; Referee: David Fernández Borbalán

31 January 2010 20	Sevilla	2–1	Valencia	Seville
21:00 CET (UTC+1)	Negredo 21', 69'	Report	Navarro 90'	Stadium: Ramón Sánchez Pizjuán Stadium; Referee: Miguel Ángel Pérez Lasa

6 February 2010 21	Valencia	2–0	Valladolid	Valencia
18:00 CET (UTC+1)	Banega 8'; Villa 29'	Report		Stadium: Mestalla; Referee: Antonio Rubinos Pérez

13 February 2010 22	Sporting Gijón	1–1	Valencia	Gijón
18:00 CET (UTC+1)	Castro 5'	Report	Mata 76'	Stadium: El Molinón; Referee: Rafael Ramírez Domínguez

22 February 2010 23	Valencia	2–1	Getafe	Valencia
21:00 CET (UTC+1)	Villa 39', 52'	Report	Manu 75'	Stadium: Mestalla; Referee: José Luis Paradas Romero

28 February 2010 24	Atlético Madrid	4–1	Valencia	Madrid
21:00 CET (UTC+1)	Forlán 30' (pen.), 86'; Agüero 78'; Jurado 90'	Report	Silva 20'	Stadium: Vicente Calderón; Referee: Alfonso Pérez Burrull

8 March 2010 25	Valencia	0–0	Racing Santander	Valencia
21:00 CET (UTC+1)		Report		Stadium: Mestalla; Referee: Javier Turienzo Álvarez

14 March 2010 26	Barcelona	3–0	Valencia	Barcelona
19:00 CET (UTC+1)	Messi 56', 81', 83'	Report		Stadium: Camp Nou; Referee: César Muñiz Fernández

21 March 2010 27	Valencia	2–0	Almería	Valencia
19:00 CET (UTC+1)	Mata 63'; Silva 70'	Report		Stadium: Mestalla; Referee: Fernando Teixeira Vitienes

24 March 2010 28	Valencia	1–0	Málaga	Valencia
22:00 CET (UTC+1)	Villa 13'	Report		Stadium: Mestalla; Referee: Carlos Clos Gómez

27 March 2010 29	Zaragoza	3–0	Valencia	Zaragoza
22:00 CET (UTC+1)	Diogo 41'; Arizmendi 63'; Jarošík 71'	Report		Stadium: La Romareda; Referee: José Luis Paradas Romero

4 April 2010 30	Valencia	3–0	Osasuna	Valencia
17:00 CEST (UTC+2)	Joaquín 48'; Villa 89', 90' (pen.)	Report	Camuñas (yellow card) 26'; Ricardo (yellow card) 90'	Stadium: Mestalla; Referee: Manuel Mejuto González

11 April 2010 31	Mallorca	3–2	Valencia	Palma de Mallorca
21:00 CEST (UTC+2)	Castro 7'; Webó 22'; Fernandes 64' (o.g.)	Report	Alba 47'; Hernández 86'	Stadium: ONO Estadi; Referee: Antonio Rubinos Pérez

15 April 2010 32	Valencia	2–0	Athletic Bilbao	Valencia
22:00 CEST (UTC+2)	Silva 35', 62'	Report		Stadium: Mestalla; Referee: José Luis González González

18 April 2010 33	Real Madrid	2–0	Valencia	Madrid
21:00 CEST (UTC+2)	Higuaín 25'; Ronaldo 78'	Report		Stadium: Santiago Bernabéu; Referee: Fernando Teixeira Vitienes

24 April 2010 34	Valencia	1–0	Deportivo La Coruña	Valencia
22:00 CEST (UTC+2)	Villa 34' (pen.)	Report		Stadium: Mestalla; Referee: David Fernández Borbalán

1 May 2010 35	Espanyol	0–2	Valencia	Cornellà de Llobregat
20:00 CEST (UTC+2)		Report	Žigić 62', 75'	Stadium: Estadi Cornellà-El Prat; Referee: Carlos Delgado

4 May 2010 36	Valencia	3–1	Xerez	Valencia
22:00 CEST (UTC+2)	Mata 44', 58'; Silva 68'	Report	Armenteros 37'	Stadium: Mestalla; Referee: Xavier Estrada Fernández

8 May 2010 37	Villarreal	2–0	Valencia	Villarreal
21:00 CEST (UTC+2)	Soriano (yellow card) 8'; Rossi 10'; Llorente (yellow card) 13' (yellow-red card) 71', (goal) 19'; Capdevila (yellow card) 72' (yellow-red card) 72'; López (yellow card) 74'	Report	Marchena (yellow card) 5'; Miguel (yellow card) 13'; Albelda (yellow card) 53'; Vicente (yellow card) 59'; Žigić (yellow card) 64'; Alba (yellow card) 78'	Stadium: Estadio El Madrigal; Referee: Carlos Clos Gómez

16 May 2010 38	Valencia	1–0	Tenerife	Valencia
19:00 CEST (UTC+2)	Alexis 90'	Report		Stadium: Mestalla; Referee: Carlos Velasco Carballo

=== Copa del Rey ===
==== Round of 32 ====
28 October 2009 First leg	Alcoyano	0–1	Valencia	Alcoy
20:00 CET (UTC+1)		Report	Joaquín 10'	Stadium: Estadio El Collao; Referee: José Paradas

10 November 2009 Second leg	Valencia	2–2 (3–2 agg.)	Alcoyano	Valencia
19:00 CET (UTC+1)	Marchena 4'; Žigić 16'	Report	Curto 40'; Carpio 85'	Stadium: Mestalla; Referee: Rafael Ramírez Domínguez
Note: Valencia won 3–2 on aggregate.

==== Round of 16 ====
6 January 2010 First leg	Valencia	1–2	Deportivo La Coruña	Valencia
20:00 CET (UTC+1)	Silva 72'	Report	Guardado 47'; Álvarez 57'	Stadium: Mestalla; Referee: Carlos Velasco Carballo

13 January 2010 Second leg	Deportivo La Coruña	2–2 (4–3 agg.)	Valencia	A Coruña
20:00 CET (UTC+1)	Filipe Luís 50'; Rodríguez 72'	Report	Žigić 11', 29'	Stadium: Riazor; Referee: Manuel Mejuto González
Note: Deportivo La Coruña won 4–3 on aggregate.

=== UEFA Europa League ===
==== Play-off round ====
20 August 2009 First leg	Stabæk (Norway)	0–3	(Spain) Valencia	Bærum, Norway
21:00 CEST (UTC+2)		Report	Hernández 29'; Villa 35', (yellow card) 73'; Joaquín 80'	Stadium: Telenor Arena; Attendance: 9,566; Referee: Aleksandar Stavrev (Macedonia)

27 August 2009 Second leg	Valencia (Spain)	4–1 (7–1 agg.)	(Norway) Stabæk	Valencia, Spain
21:30 CEST (UTC+2)	Miku 28', 29', 80'; Žigić 77'	Report	Farnerud 36'	Stadium: Mestalla; Attendance: 12,000; Referee: Bas Nijhuis (Netherlands)
Note: Valencia won 7–1 on aggregate.

==== Group stage ====
Pos	Team	Pld	W	D	L	GF	GA	GD	Pts	Qualification	VAL	LIL	GEN	SLV
1	(Spain) Valencia	6	3	3	0	12	8	+4	12	Advance to knockout phase	—	3–1	3–2	1–1
2	(France) Lille	6	3	1	2	15	9	+6	10	Advance to knockout phase	1–1	—	3–0	3–1
3	(Italy) Genoa	6	2	1	3	8	10	−2	7		1–2	3–2	—	2–0
4	(Czech Republic) Slavia Prague	6	0	3	3	5	13	−8	3		2–2	1–5	0–0	—

Source: Soccerway

17 September 2009 1	Lille (France)	1–1	(Spain) Valencia	Villeneuve d'Ascq, France
19:00 CEST (UTC+2)	Balmont (yellow card) 46'; Obraniak (yellow card) 73'; Gervinho 86'	Report	Bruno (yellow card) 25'; Alba (yellow card) 63'; Mata 78'; Maduro (yellow card) 90+3'	Stadium: Stadium Lille-Metropole; Attendance: 14,676; Referee: Alexandru Tudor (Romania)

1 October 2009 2	Valencia (Spain)	3–2	(Italy) Genoa	Valencia, Spain
21:05 CEST (UTC+2)	Silva 52', (yellow card) 86'; Žigić 56'; Mathieu (yellow card) 63'; Villa 82' (pen.); Banega (yellow card) 90'	Report	Floccari 43'; Kharja 64' (pen.); Moretti (yellow card) 72'; Mesto (yellow card) 74'; Esposito (yellow card) 81'	Stadium: Mestalla; Attendance: 21,333; Referee: Cüneyt Çakır (Turkey)

22 October 2009 3	Valencia (Spain)	1–1	(Czech Republic) Slavia Prague	Valencia, Spain
21:05 CEST (UTC+2)	Mathieu (yellow card) 34'; D. Navarro 63'; Villa (red card) 85'	Report	Naumov 28'; Ragued (yellow card) 58' (yellow-red card) 76'; Hloušek (yellow card) 66'; Trapp (yellow card) 76'; Vomáčka (yellow card) 86'	Stadium: Mestalla; Attendance: 20,632; Referee: Serge Gumienny (Belgium)

5 November 2009 4	Slavia Prague (Czech Republic)	2–2	(Spain) Valencia	Prague, Czech Republic
19:00 CET (UTC+1)	Šenkeřík (yellow card) 45+2' (yellow-red card) 48'; Trapp (yellow card) 69'; Janda 79'; Grajciar 82', (yellow card) 84'; Šmicer (yellow card) 90+2'	Report	Joaquín 22' (pen.); Maduro 47'; Pablo Hernández (yellow card) 60'; Mathieu (yellow card) 62'; Del Horno (yellow card) 84'; Baraja (yellow card) 88' (yellow-red card) 90+4'	Stadium: Synot Tip Arena; Attendance: 10,624; Referee: Svein Oddvar Moen (Norway)

2 December 2009 5	Valencia (Spain)	3–1	(France) Lille	Valencia, Spain
21:05 CET (UTC+1)	Joaquín 3', 32'; Alexis (yellow card) 44'; Mata 52'; Banega (yellow card) 67'; Miku (yellow card) 89'	Report	Gervinho (yellow card) 20'; Cabaye (yellow card) 56'; Chedjou (yellow card) 89', (goal) 90+1'; Debuchy (yellow card) 90+4'	Stadium: Mestalla; Attendance: 26,193; Referee: Mike Dean (England)

17 December 2009 6	Genoa (Italy)	1–2	(Spain) Valencia	Genoa, Italy
19:00 CET (UTC+1)	Jurić (yellow card) 25'; Sculli (yellow card) 42'; Crespo 51'; Bocchetti (yellow card) 85'	Report	Villa (yellow card) 20', (penalty missed) 85', 90+5'; Bruno (yellow card) 33', (goal) 45+1'; Banega (yellow card) 70'; Moyá (yellow card) 74'; Albelda (yellow card) 86'	Stadium: Stadio Luigi Ferraris; Attendance: 23,480; Referee: Alan Kelly (Republic of Ireland)

==== Knockout phase ====
===== Round of 32 =====
18 February 2010 First leg	Club Brugge (Belgium)	1–0	(Spain) Valencia	Bruges, Belgium
19:00 CET (UTC+1)	Blondel (yellow card) 19'; Kouemaha 56'; Odjidja-Ofoe (yellow card) 86'	Report	Silva (yellow card) 31' (yellow-red card) 51'; Albelda (yellow card) 54'; Pablo Hernández (yellow card) 90+4'	Stadium: Jan Breydel Stadium; Attendance: 21,657; Referee: Tony Chapron (France)

25 February 2010 Second leg	Valencia (Spain)	3–0 (a.e.t.) (3–1 agg.)	(Belgium) Club Brugge	Valencia, Spain
21:05 CET (UTC+1)	Mata 1'; Villa (yellow card) 34'; Baraja (yellow card) 40'; Pablo Hernández 96', 117'	Report	Kouemaha (yellow card) 7'; Klukowski (yellow card) 60'; Odjidja-Ofoe (yellow card) 90+2'	Stadium: Mestalla; Attendance: 45,297; Referee: Claus Bo Larsen (Denmark)
Note: Valencia won 3–1 on aggregate.

===== Round of 16 =====
11 March 2010 First leg	Valencia (Spain)	1–1	(Germany) Werder Bremen	Valencia, Spain
21:05 CET (UTC+1)	Banega (red card) 55'; Sánchez (yellow card) 55'; Mata 57'; Marchena (yellow card) 67'; Pablo Hernández (yellow card) 76'	Report	Frings 24' (pen.), (yellow card) 37'; Borowski (yellow card) 35'; Pasanen (yellow card) 47'; Bargfrede (yellow card) 72'; Naldo (yellow card) 79'; Wiese (yellow card) 87'	Stadium: Mestalla; Attendance: 37,223; Referee: Martin Atkinson (England)

18 March 2010 Second leg	Werder Bremen (Germany)	4–4 (5–5 (a) agg.)	(Spain) Valencia	Bremen, Germany
19:00 CET (UTC+1)	Almeida 26'; Frings 57' (pen.); Marin 62'; Pizarro 84'; Rosenberg (yellow card) 87'	Report	Villa 3', 45', 66'; Mata 15', (yellow card) 82'; Joaquín (yellow card) 55'; Alba (yellow card) 57'; Miguel (yellow card) 67'; Baraja (yellow card) 90+2'	Stadium: Weserstadion; Attendance: 24,200; Referee: Kevin Blom (Netherlands)
Note: 5–5 on aggregate. Valencia won on away goals.

===== Quarter-finals =====
1 April 2010 First leg	Valencia (Spain)	2–2	(Spain) Atlético Madrid	Valencia, Spain
21:05 CEST (UTC+2)	Bruno (yellow card) 44'; Mata (yellow card) 54'; Pablo Hernández (yellow card) 63'; Fernandes 66'; Villa 82'	Report	Forlán 59'; Ujfaluši (yellow card) 66'; García (yellow card) 69'; López 72'; Agüero (yellow card) 90+4'	Stadium: Mestalla; Attendance: 46,310; Referee: Craig Thomson (Scotland)

8 April 2010 Second leg	Atlético Madrid (Spain)	0–0 ((a) 2–2 agg.)	(Spain) Valencia	Madrid, Spain
21:05 CEST (UTC+2)	Reyes (yellow card) 24'; Agüero (yellow card) 90+5'	Report	Joaquín (yellow card) 34'; Mata (yellow card) 40'; Silva (yellow card) 74'	Stadium: Vicente Calderón; Attendance: 49,907; Referee: Florian Meyer (Germany)
Note: 2–2 on aggregate. Atlético Madrid won on away goals.
