= Football records and statistics in the Czech Republic =

This page details football records in the Czech Republic.

== Team records ==
=== Most championships won ===
==== Overall ====
- 11, Sparta Prague (1993–94, 1994–95, 1996–97, 1997–98, 1998–99, 1999–00, 2000–01, 2002–03, 2004–05, 2006–07, 2009–10)

==== Consecutives ====
- 5, Sparta Prague (1996–97, 1997–98, 1998–99, 1999–00, 2000–01)

=== Most seasons in Czech First League ===
- 27, Slavia Prague
- 27, Slovan Liberec
- 27, Sparta Prague

=== Most games won ===
- 499, Sparta Prague

=== Most games drawn ===
- 227, Banik Ostrava

=== Most games lost ===
- 292, Zbrojovka Brno

== Individual records ==
=== League Appearances ===
Including appearances in the Czechoslovak era

- 465, Jaroslav Šilhavý

Czech First League (since 1993)

- 436, Stanislav Vlček
- 432, Martin Vaniak
- 432, Rudolf Otepka
- 426, Pavel Horváth
- 418, David Lafata

=== League Goalscorers ===
- 198, David Lafata

Czech First League (since 1993)

- 198, David Lafata
- 134, Horst Siegl
- 125, Libor Došek
- 94, Milan Škoda
- 94, Stanislav Vlček
- 92, Luděk Zelenka

== Attendance records ==
=== Top 10 Highest Attendances ===
The top ten highest league attendances have all been at Stadion Za Lužánkami in Brno.

Date	Home team	Attendance	Away team	Stadium	Season
2 October 1996	Brno	44,120	Slavia Prague	Stadion Za Lužánkami	1996–97
unknown date	Brno	37,150	Drnovice	Stadion Za Lužánkami	1996–97
unknown date	Brno	34,770	Slavia Prague	Stadion Za Lužánkami	1994–95
unknown date	Brno	31,732	Sparta Prague	Stadion Za Lužánkami	1997–98
unknown date	Brno	28,695	Sparta Prague	Stadion Za Lužánkami	1994–95
unknown date	Brno	28,320	Sparta Prague	Stadion Za Lužánkami	1996–97
unknown date	Brno	26,870	Drnovice	Stadion Za Lužánkami	1995–96
unknown date	Brno	26,200	Liberec	Stadion Za Lužánkami	1996–97
unknown date	Brno	26,122	Viktoria Žižkov	Stadion Za Lužánkami	1994–95
unknown date	Brno	24,811	Karviná	Stadion Za Lužánkami	1996–97

== Total Titles Won ==
As of 24 May 2026

Club	Domestic Titles						International Titles					Overall titles
Club	Czechia & Czechoslovakia & Bohemia and Moravia Leagues	Czech Cup (1939–present)	Czechoslovak Cup	Czech Supercup	Czech-Slovak Supercup	Total	International Soccer League	Mitropa Cup	Mitropa Super Cup	Intertoto Cup	Total	Overall titles
Sparta Prague	38	22	8	2	-	70	-	3	-	-	3	73
Slavia Prague	23	11	-	-	1	35	-	1	-	4	5	40
Dukla Prague	11	4	8	-	-	23	1	-	-	-	1	24
Baník Ostrava	4	5	3	-	-	12	-	1	1	-	2	14
Viktoria Plzeň	6	2	-	2	-	10	-	-	-	-	-	10
Slovan Liberec	3	2	-	-	-	5	-	-	-	-	-	5
Zlín	-	2	1	-	1	4	-	-	-	-	-	4
Bohemians Prague	1	1	-	-	-	2	-	-	-	1	1	3
Viktoria Žižkov	1	2	-	-	-	3	-	-	-	-	-	3
Teplice	-	3	-	-	-	3	-	-	-	-	-	3
Jablonec	-	2	-	1	-	3	-	-	-	-	-	3
Sigma Olomouc	-	2	-	1	-	3	-	-	-	-	-	3
Hradec Králové	1	1	-	-	-	2	-	-	-	-	-	2
Mladá Boleslav	-	2	-	-	-	2	-	-	-	-	-	2
Vítkovice	1	-	-	-	-	1	-	-	-	-	-	1
Zbrojovka Brno	1	-	-	-	-	1	-	-	-	-	-	1
Karviná	-	1	-	-	-	1	-	-	-	-	-	1
Olomouc ASO	-	1	-	-	-	1	-	-	-	-	-	1
Slovácko	-	1	-	-	-	1	-	-	-	-	-	1

== See also ==
- List of football clubs by competitive honours won
