= Zákostelský =

Zákostelský is a Czech surname, its female form is Zákostelská. Notable people with the surname include:

- Jan Zákostelský (born 1991), Czech footballer
- Luboš Zákostelský (born 1967), Czech footballer and manager
