= Petr Veselý =

Petr Veselý may refer to:

- Petr Veselý (footballer) (born 1971), Czech football player
- Petr Veselý (canoeist) (born 1976), Czech canoeist
