= Luboš Zákostelský =

Czech footballer and manager

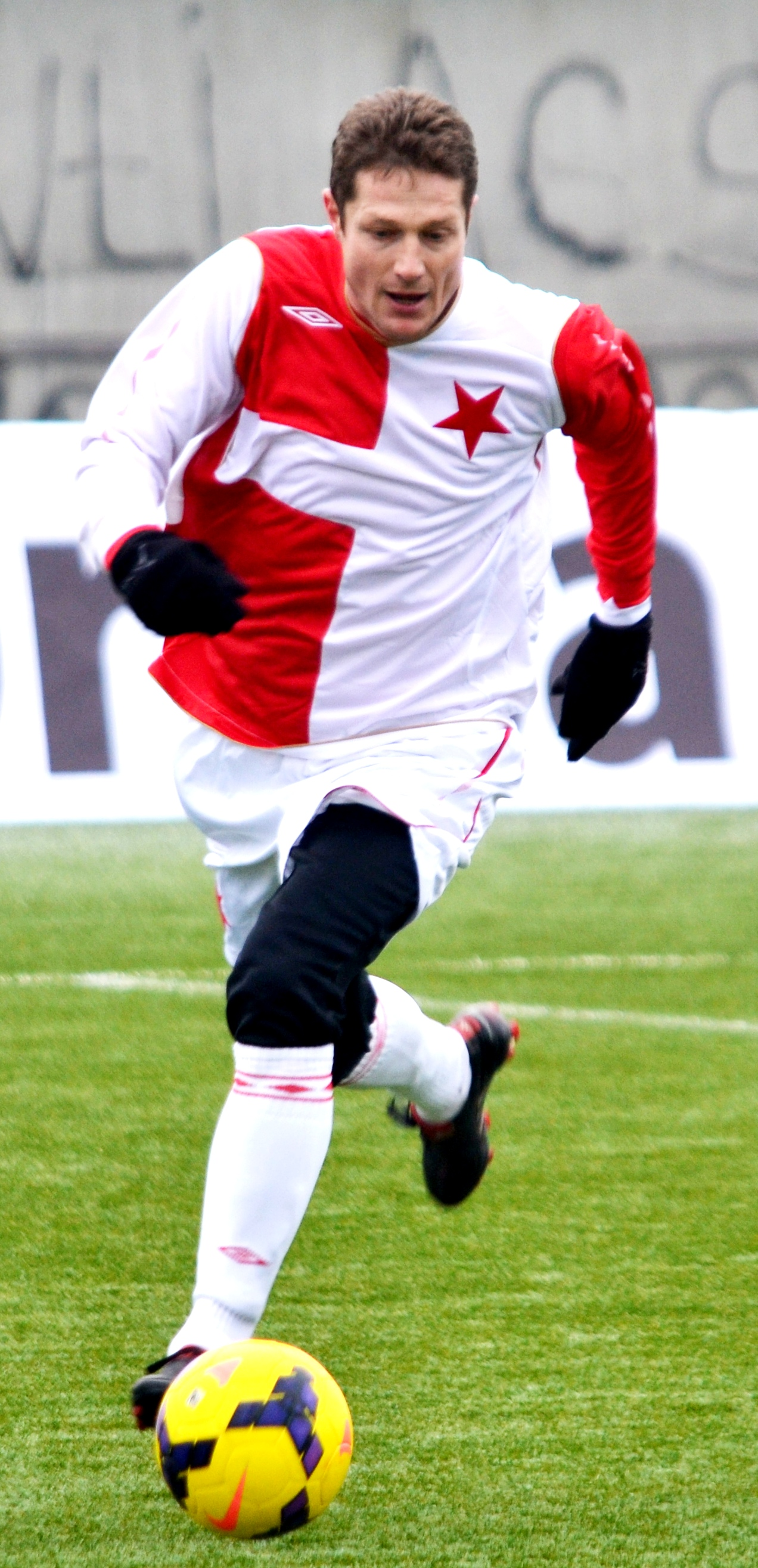

Personal information
- Date of birth: 25 September 1967 (age 59)
- Place of birth: Czechoslovakia
- Position: Forward

Senior career*
Years	Team	Apps	(Gls)
1988–1991	Slavia Prague	14	(2)
1993-1994	Benešov	14	(0)
1994–1996	Slovan Liberec	40	(8)
1996	Consadole Sapporo	6	(1)
1997–1999	Slovan Liberec	63	(11)
1999–2000	Viktoria Plzeň	29	(9)
2001–2002	Chmel Blšany	17	(2)
2002–2004	Zenit Čáslav		

Managerial career
- Čáslav
- 2007: Vysočina Jihlava
- 2009–2012: Sezimovo Ústí
- * Club domestic league appearances and goals

Luboš Zákostelský (born 25 September 1967) is a Czech former football player and a football manager. As a player, he played as a forward, making more than 150 appearances in the Gambrinus liga. He also played in lower-level competitions in Austria, Japan and Germany.

His son Jan Zákostelský is also a football player.
