= Matej Krajčík =

Slovak footballer

Matěj Krajčík
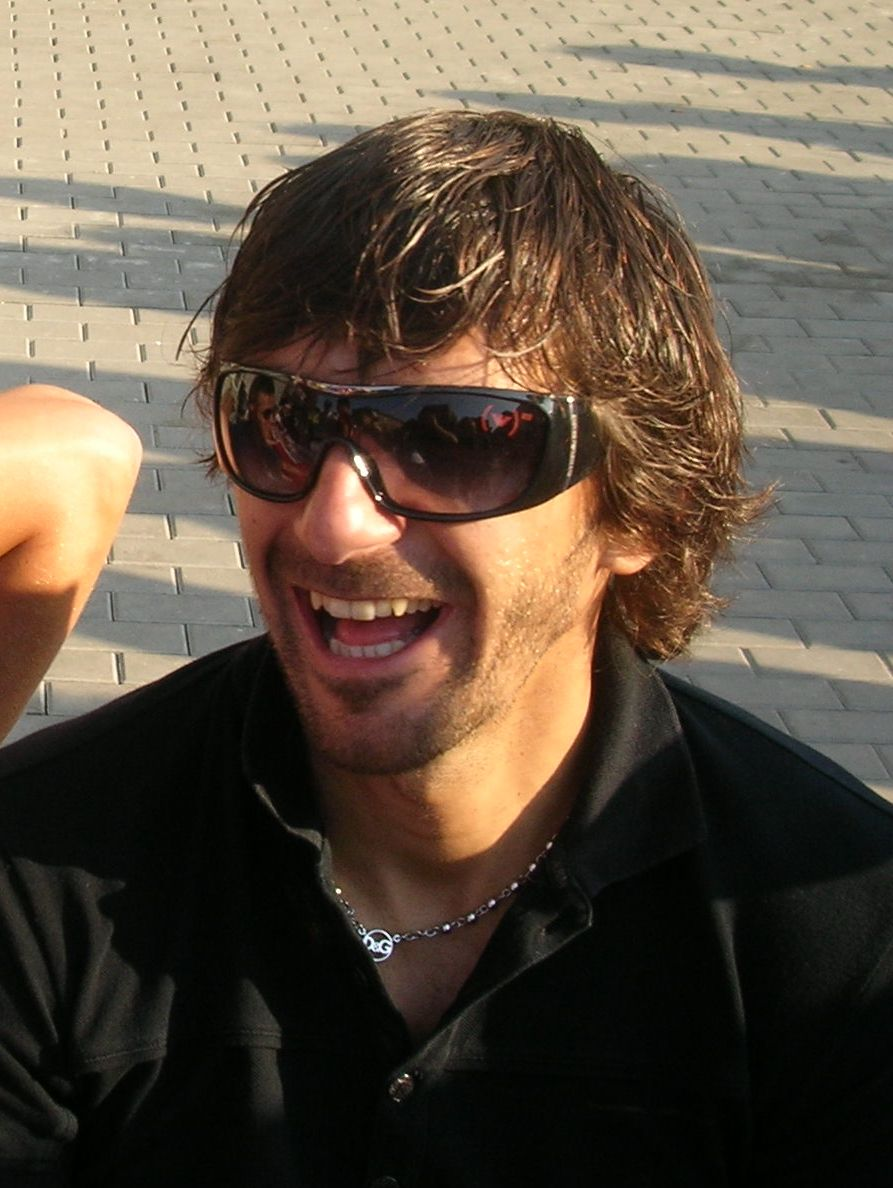

Personal information
- Date of birth: 19 March 1978 (age 48)
- Place of birth: Trenčín, Czechoslovakia
- Height: 1.88 m (6 ft 2 in)
- Position: Right-back

Youth career
- 1986–1992: SH Senica
- 1992–1996: Považská Bystrica

Senior career*
Years	Team	Apps	(Gls)
1996	FK Senica		
1996–1997	VTJ Malacky		
1997–1998	VP Frýdek-Místek	33	(2)
1999–2001	FC Vítkovice	44	(1)
2001–2003	Xaverov	36	(6)
2003–2008	Slavia Prague	91	(4)
2004	→ Viktoria Žižkov (loan)	10	(0)
2005	→ České Budějovice (loan)	11	(0)
2009	Reggina	12	(0)
2009–2010	Slavia Prague	27	(1)
2010–2012	FK Jablonec	10	(0)
2012	→ České Budějovice (loan)	13	(0)
2012–2013	FK Senica	24	(0)

International career
2005–2009	Slovakia	18	(0)
- * Club domestic league appearances and goals

Matěj Krajčík (born 19 March 1978) is a former Slovak footballer. He played for the Slovakia national team from 2005 to 2009.

At club level, Krajčík played in the Czech Republic for VP Frýdek-Místek, FC Vítkovice and Xaverov, before joining Slavia Prague in 2003. Whilst at Slavia, he played on loan for Viktoria Žižkov and České Budějovice. Krajčík moved to Italy in January 2009 to play for Reggina, signing a 2.5-year contract. He made his club debut as an 80th-minute substitute in a 1–0 loss against Siena the same month. He returned to Slavia after Reggina were relegated from the 2008–09 Serie A. He subsequently played for FK Jablonec before spending the spring part of the 2011–12 Czech First League on loan at České Budějovice.
