= Jan Kopic =

Czech footballer

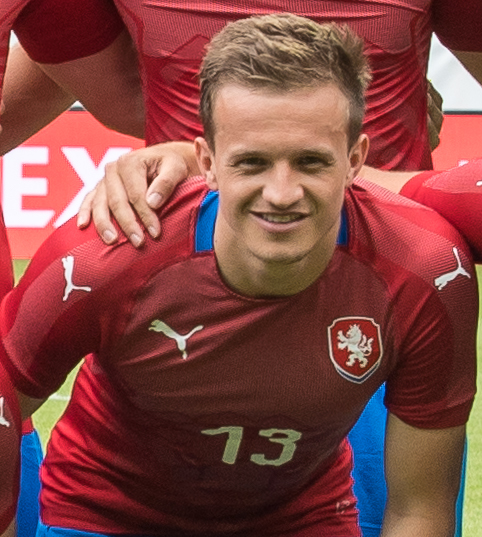
- Kopic in 2018

Personal information
- Date of birth: 4 June 1990 (age 36)
- Place of birth: Humpolec, Czechoslovakia
- Height: 1.79 m (5 ft 10 in)
- Position: Midfielder

Team information
- Current team: Viktoria Plzeň
- Number: 10

Senior career*
Years	Team	Apps	(Gls)
2010–2011	Jihlava	12	(0)
2010	→ Čáslav (loan)	12	(2)
2011–2015	Jablonec	115	(23)
2015–	Viktoria Plzeň	241	(36)

International career^{‡}
2011	Czech Republic U20	1	(0)
2011–2012	Czech Republic U21	11	(0)
2014–	Czech Republic	17	(3)
- * Club domestic league appearances and goals as of 17 June 2025 ‡ National team caps and goals as of 10 September 2019

Jan Kopic (born 4 June 1990) is a Czech professional footballer who plays as a midfielder for Viktoria Plzeň in the Czech First League and the Czech Republic national team. He has represented the Czech Republic at under-21 level. Kopic is the younger brother of Czech footballer Milan Kopic.

== International career ==
Kopic was called up to the Czech Republic for the first time ahead of the June 2014 friendly match against Austria. In 2016, Kopic scored his first goal for the Czech senior squad in a friendly match against Armenia, ending in a 3–0 victory for the Czechs.

== Career statistics ==
=== Club ===
As of match played 22 June 2024

Club	Season	League			Czech Cup		Europe		Other		Total	
Club	Season	Division	Apps	Goals	Apps	Goals	Apps	Goals	Apps	Goals	Apps	Goals
Čáslav (loan)	2010–11	Czech National Football League	12	2	0	0	—		—		12	2
Jihlava	2010–11	Czech National Football League	12	0	0	0	—		—		12	0
Jablonec	2011–12	Czech First League	29	5	4	0	4	0	—		37	5
Jablonec	2012–13	Czech First League	29	4	5	1	—		—		34	5
Jablonec	2013–14	Czech First League	27	6	7	2	4	1	1 (Note: Appearance in Czech Supercup)	1	39	10
Jablonec	2014–15	Czech First League	30	8	9	3	—		—		39	11
Jablonec	Total		115	23	25	6	8	1	1	1	149	31
Viktoria Plzeň	2015–16	Czech First League	26	3	5	3	8	2	1	0	42	8
Viktoria Plzeň	2016–17	Czech First League	22	2	1	0	9	0	—		32	2
Viktoria Plzeň	2017–18	Czech First League	29	6	0	0	13	3	—		42	9
Viktoria Plzeň	2018–19	Czech First League	23	5	1	0	4	0	—		28	5
Viktoria Plzeň	2019–20	Czech First League	29	7	3	1	4	0	—		36	8
Viktoria Plzeň	2020–21	Czech First League	16	2	1	0	3	0	—		20	2
Viktoria Plzeň	2021–22	Czech First League	27	5	2	0	0	0	—		29	5
Viktoria Plzeň	2022–23	Czech First League	21	3	0	0	8	2	—		29	5
Viktoria Plzeň	2023–24	Czech First League	24	0	4	3	13	2	—		41	5
Viktoria Plzeň	Total		217	33	17	7	64	9	1	0	299	49
Career total			264	58	42	13	72	10	2	1	472	82

=== International ===
Scores and results list the Czech Republic's goal tally first.

No	Date	Venue	Opponent	Score	Result	Competition
1.	31 August 2016	Městský stadion, Mladá Boleslav, Czech Republic	Armenia	3–0	3–0	Friendly
2.	5 October 2017	Baku Olympic Stadium, Baku, Azerbaijan	Azerbaijan	1–0	2–1	2018 FIFA World Cup qualification
3.	8 October 2017	Doosan Arena, Plzeň, Czech Republic	San Marino	3–0	5–0	2018 FIFA World Cup qualification

== Honours ==
Jablonec

- Czech Cup: 2012–13
- Czech Supercup: 2013

Viktoria Plzeň

- Czech First League: 2015–16, 2017–18, 2021–22
- Czech Supercup: 2015
