= David Hubáček =

Czech footballer (born 1977)

Personal information
- Date of birth: 23 February 1977 (age 49)
- Place of birth: Gottwaldov, Czechoslovakia
- Height: 1.74 m (5 ft 9 in)
- Position: Left-back

Youth career
- 1987–1996: FC Svit Zlín

Senior career*
Years	Team	Apps	(Gls)
1996–1997	VTJ Znojmo		
1997–2005	FC Tescoma Zlín	193	(2)
2005–2013	SK Slavia Prague	199	(2)
2013–2017	FC Fastav Zlín	77	(0)

Managerial career
- 2018–2022: Zlín (assistant)
- 2024–: Zlín B
- * Club domestic league appearances and goals

David Hubáček (born 23 February 1977) is a former Czech professional footballer who played for Znojmo, Zlín and Slavia Prague.

He won two Czech First League titles with Slavia Prague, in 2008 and 2009.
