= Milan Kopic =

Czech former footballer (born 1985)

Personal information
- Full name: Milan Kopic
- Date of birth: 23 November 1985 (age 40)
- Place of birth: Pelhřimov, Czechoslovakia
- Height: 1.87 m (6 ft 2 in)
- Position: Defender

Youth career
- 1991–1997: Humpolec
- 1997–2005: Vysočina Jihlava

Senior career*
Years	Team	Apps	(Gls)
2005–2006	Vysočina Jihlava	9	(1)
2006–2007	Sparta Prague	0	(0)
2007–2008	Mladá Boleslav	36	(2)
2008–2012	Heerenveen	11	(1)
2010	→ Slavia Prague	9	(0)
2012	Slovan Bratislava	3	(0)
2013–2014	Vysočina Jihlava	6	(1)
Total		74	(5)

International career
2006–2007	Czech Republic U21	6	(0)
- * Club domestic league appearances and goals

Milan Kopic (born 23 November 1985) is a Czech former footballer who played as a defender. He is the older brother of Czech footballer Jan Kopic.

== Career ==
Kopic was the second Czech player to play for Dutch side SC Heerenveen, where Michal Švec had been playing since January 2008. On 15 January 2010, Heerenveen loaned him to Slavia Prague on loan until June 2010.

== International career ==
Kopic made his debut for the Czech Republic U21 team in 2006.

== Honours ==
- KNVB Cup: 2009
