= Petr Veselý (footballer) =

Czech footballer (born 1971)

Personal information
- Date of birth: 7 June 1971 (age 55)
- Place of birth: Přerov, Czechoslovakia
- Height: 1.75 m (5 ft 9 in)
- Position: Defender

Youth career
- 1978–1987: Spartak PS Přerov
- 1987–1989: Baník Ostrava

Senior career*
Years	Team	Apps	(Gls)
1989–1990	Baník Ostrava	0	(0)
1990–1991	Spartak Hradec Králové	37	(3)
1992–1995	Baník Ostrava	102	(5)
1996–1998	Petra Drnovice	80	(4)
1999–2001	Baník Ostrava	75	(5)
2002	AO Patraikos	6	(0)
2002–2003	ŠK Slovan Bratislava	9	(0)
2004–2007	FC Hlučín	24	(3)

International career
1994–2000	Czech Republic	2	(0)
- * Club domestic league appearances and goals

Petr Veselý (born 7 June 1971) is a former Czech football player.

Veselý played mostly for Baník Ostrava and Petra Drnovice in the Gambrinus liga. He also represented the Czech Republic twice at the international level.
