= Jaroslav Černý (footballer) =

Czech footballer

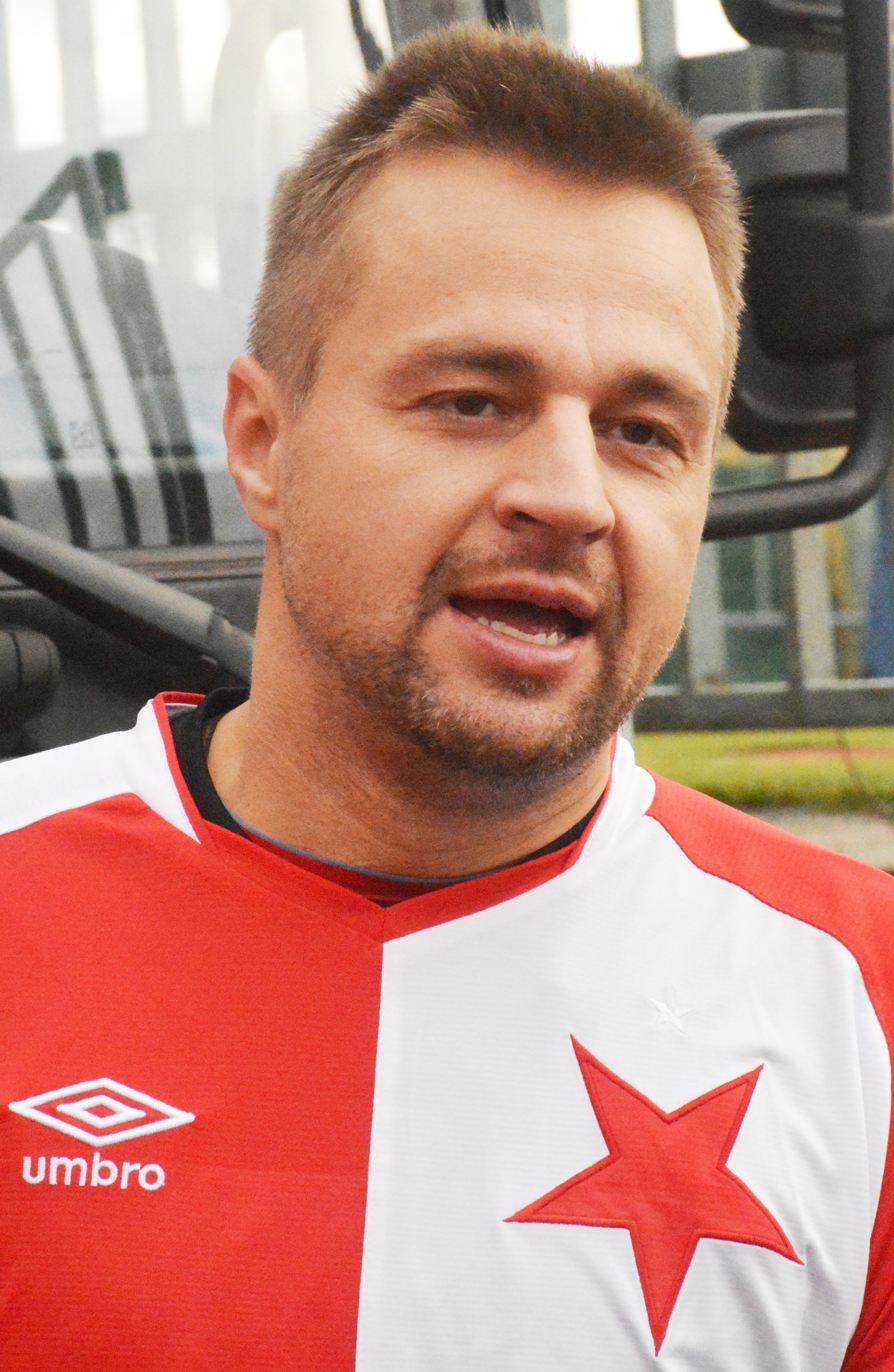

Personal information
- Full name: Jaroslav Černý
- Date of birth: 26 June 1979 (age 47)
- Place of birth: Horní Benešov, Czechoslovakia
- Height: 1.78 m (5 ft 10 in)
- Position: Midfielder

Youth career
- Fotbal Třinec

Senior career*
Years	Team	Apps	(Gls)
1999–2001	Třinec	40	(4)
2001–2002	Opava	28	(2)
2002–2004	Sigma Olomouc	27	(1)
2004–2006	Brno	51	(6)
2006–2008	Dynamo České Budějovice	37	(8)
2008–2011	Slavia Prague	62	(8)
2011	Ankaragücü	2	(0)
2012–2013	Senica	11	(2)
2013	→ Dynamo České Budějovice (loan)	5	(0)
2013	→ SK Strakonice 1918 (loan)	?	(?)

International career^{‡}
2009	Czech Republic	2	(0)
- * Club domestic league appearances and goals as of 10 July 2013 ‡ National team caps and goals as of 22 May 2010

Jaroslav Černý (born 26 June 1979 in Horní Benešov) is a Czech football midfielder. He notably played for Ankaragücü or Senica. .
