= Jan Zákostelský =

Czech footballer

Personal information
- Date of birth: 25 November 1991 (age 34)
- Place of birth: Benešov, Czechoslovakia
- Height: 1.91 m (6 ft 3 in)
- Position: Forward

Team information
- Current team: FK Zbuzany 1953
- Number: 3

Senior career*
Years	Team	Apps	(Gls)
2009–2013	Slavia Prague	8	(1)
2012	→ Vlašim (loan)	9	(0)
2013–2014	Slavia Prague B		
2014–2019	Benešov		
2019–	Slavoj Vyšehrad	14	(3)
2019–	→ FK Zbuzany 1953 (loan)	9	(1)
- * Club domestic league appearances and goals as of 6 October 2019

Jan Zákostelský (born 25 November 1991) is a Czech football forward who currently plays for FK Zbuzany 1953 on loan from Slavoj Vyšehrad.

His father Luboš Zákostelský was also a football player.
