= Martin Lukeš =

Czech footballer

Personal information
- Date of birth: 17 November 1978 (age 47)
- Place of birth: Bruntál, Czechoslovakia
- Height: 1.81 m (5 ft 11 in)
- Position: Midfielder

Youth career
- 1984–1989: Slavoj Bruntál
- 1989–1998: FC Baník Ostrava

Senior career*
Years	Team	Apps	(Gls)
1998–2003	FC Baník Ostrava	70	(10)
2003–2004	SK Slavia Praha	20	(1)
2004–2014	FC Baník Ostrava	177	(22)

International career^{‡}
1997–2000	Czech Republic U21	5	(2)
1998	Czech Republic	2	(2)
- * Club domestic league appearances and goals as of 15 August 2021 ‡ National team caps and goals as of August 2010

Martin Lukeš (born 17 November 1978) is a Czech former footballer who played for FC Baník Ostrava as their captain.

== Club career ==
Lukeš played almost his whole Gambrinus liga career for FC Baník Ostrava. In the 2003–04 season, however, when Baník won the league title, Lukeš was at Slavia Prague. The following season he returned to Baník.

In 1997, he won the Talent of the Year award at the Czech Footballer of the Year awards. The following year he made his debut in the Czech national team.
