= Zdeněk Šenkeřík =

Czech footballer

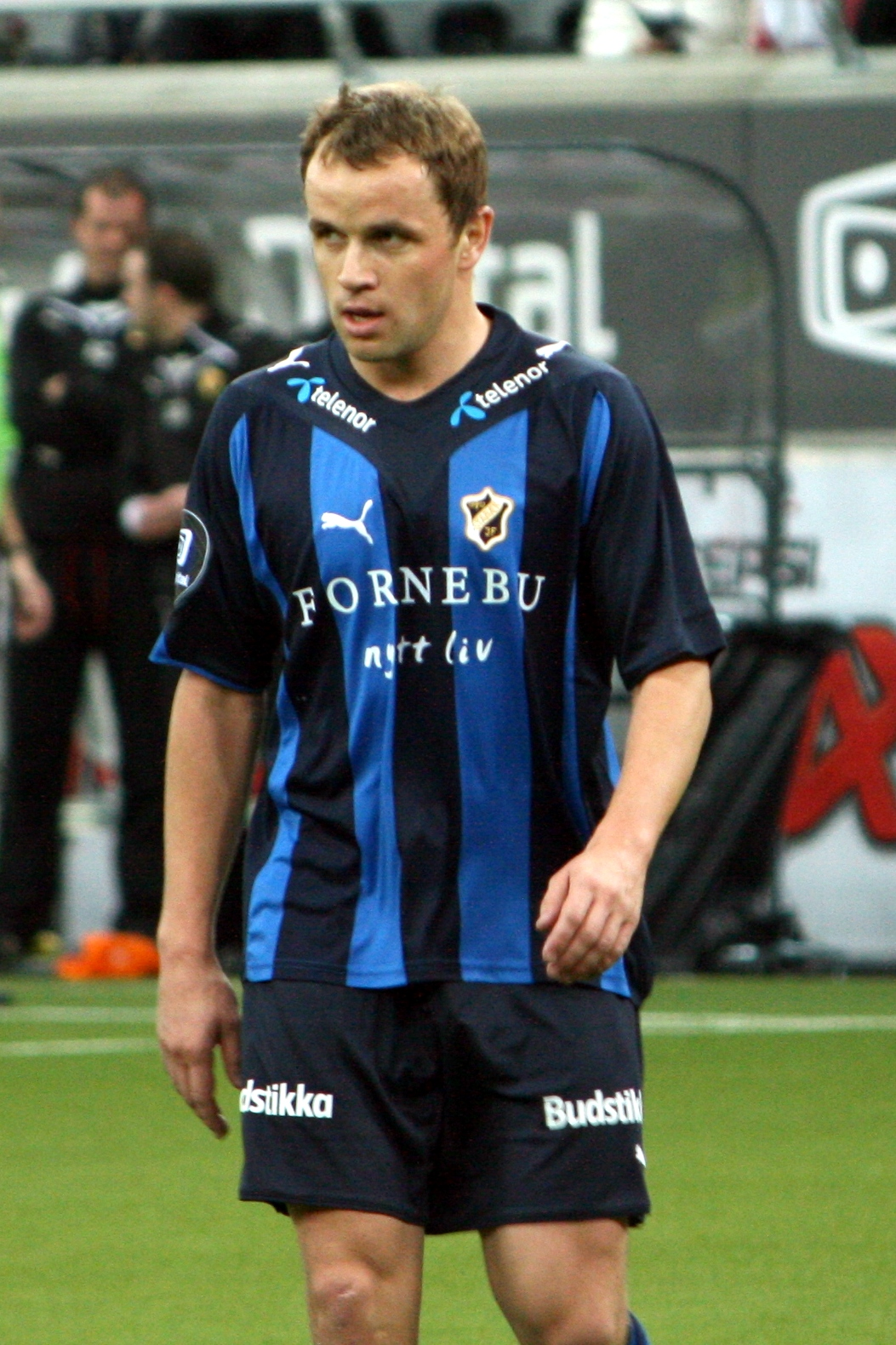

Personal information
- Date of birth: 19 December 1980 (age 45)
- Place of birth: Gottwaldov, Czechoslovakia
- Height: 1.76 m (5 ft 9 in)
- Position: Striker

Senior career*
| Years | Team | Apps | (Gls) |
| 1997–1998 | FC Svit Zlín | 12 | (0) |
| 1998–1999 | FC Bohemians Praha | 1 | (0) |
| 1999 | AFK Sokol Semice | ? | (?) |
| 2000 | Dukla Dejvice | ? | (?) |
| 2000–2003 | FC Bohemians Praha | 41 | (7) |
| 2003–2006 | FK Jablonec 97 | 78 | (13) |
| 2006–2007 | Malatyaspor | 44 | (14) |
| 2007–2010 | SK Slavia Praha | 56 | (9) |
| 2009 | → Stabæk (loan) | 2 | (0) |
| 2010–2012 | FC Baník Ostrava | 42 | (4) |
| 2012–2013 | Bohemians | 33 | (0) |
- * Club domestic league appearances and goals

Zdeněk Šenkeřík (born 19 December 1980) is a Czech former football striker. His last professional club was Bohemians, who he played for in the Czech 2. Liga. On 19 September 2007, he scored Slavia Prague's first ever UEFA Champions League goal in a match against FC Steaua București that ended in a 2–1 victory.
