= Benjamin Vomáčka =

Czech footballer (born 1978)

Personal information
- Date of birth: 27 June 1978 (age 48)
- Place of birth: Liberec, Czechoslovakia
- Height: 1.87 m (6 ft 1 1/2 in)
- Position: Defender

Team information
- Current team: FC Baník Ostrava

Youth career
- 1995–1997: Slovan Liberec

Senior career*
Years	Team	Apps	(Gls)
1997–1998	Slovan Liberec		
1998–2000	Bohemians 1905	28	(2)
2001–2002	FC Viktoria Plzeň	40	(2)
2002–2003	ŠK Slovan Bratislava	43	(7)
2004–2009	MŠK Žilina	158	(12)
2009–2012	SK Slavia Prague	20	(0)
2011–2012	→ FC Baník Ostrava (loan)	24	(3)
2012–	FC Baník Ostrava	28	(0)
- * Club domestic league appearances and goals as of 31 December 2013

Benjamin Vomáčka (born 27 June 1978 in Liberec) is a Czech football player who currently plays for FC Baník Ostrava.
