= Milan Černý =

Czech footballer

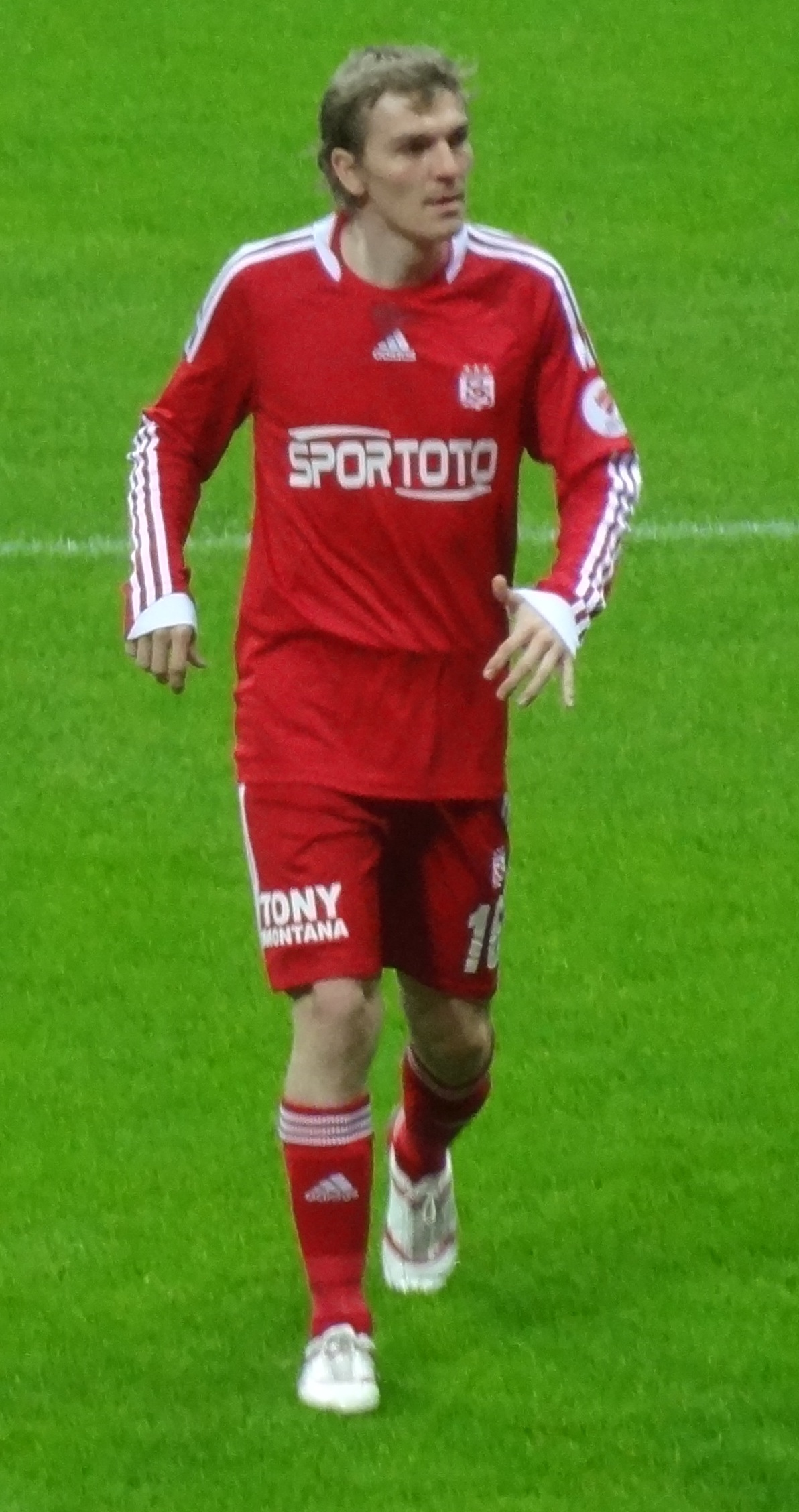

Personal information
- Date of birth: 16 March 1988 (age 38)
- Place of birth: Prague, Czechoslovakia
- Height: 1.74 m (5 ft 9 in)
- Position: Midfielder

Team information
- Current team: Slavoj Vyšehrad
- Number: 16

Youth career
- –2005: Slavia Prague

Senior career*
Years	Team	Apps	(Gls)
2005–2011	Slavia Prague	53	(3)
2011–2013	Sivasspor	41	(3)
2013–2014	Dukla Prague	12	(0)
2014–2016	Slavia Prague	31	(1)
2016–2020	Hradec Králové	72	(2)
2020–2021	Slavoj Vyšehrad	27	(1)
2021–	FK Kosoř		

International career
2004	Czech Republic U16	9	(0)
2004–2005	Czech Republic U-17	13	(2)
2005	Czech Republic U-18	1	(1)
2006	Czech Republic U-19	3	(0)
2009–2011	Czech Republic U-21	10	(0)
2010–	Czech Republic	3	(1)
- * Club domestic league appearances and goals as of 13:11, 7 January 2023 (UTC)

Milan Černý (born 16 March 1988) is a Czech football player who currently plays for Czech club FK Kosoř.

== Career ==
Černý began his career with Slavia Prague on youth side, he played his first game in the Gambrinus liga on 14 May 2005 against Příbram. In May 2006, his career was halted due to a knee injury.

In July 2011, he signed a contract with Turkish club Sivasspor. He returned to the Czech Republic in September 2013 and signed a one-year deal with Dukla Prague. In June 2014, he signed a contract with his former club Slavia Prague.

== International career ==
Černý was a member of the Czech under-21 team. He represented the team at the 2011 UEFA European Under-21 Championship.

Černý made his debut for the Czech national team as a substitute in the 1-2 friendly loss to Turkey on 22 May 2010. He also scored his first goal in the same match. He made three appearances for the national team in 2010, but none since.

Czech Republic national team
Year	Apps	Goals
2010	3	1
Total	3	1
