= Peter Grajciar =

Slovak footballer

Personal information
- Full name: Peter Grajciar
- Date of birth: 17 September 1983 (age 43)
- Place of birth: Zvolen, Czechoslovakia
- Height: 1.82 m (6 ft 0 in)
- Positions: Right winger; midfielder

Team information
- Current team: TJ Slavoj Koloveč

Youth career
- Zvolen

Senior career*
Years	Team	Apps	(Gls)
2003–2004	Zvolen		
2004–2008	Nitra	83	(9)
2008–2010	Slavia Praha	37	(6)
2010–2011	Konyaspor	29	(8)
2011–2013	Sparta Prague	30	(5)
2013–2014	Dinamo Tbilisi	10	(4)
2014	Vlašim	7	(1)
2015–2017	Śląsk Wrocław	57	(6)
2017–2018	Příbram	31	(7)
2018–2019	České Budějovice	19	(2)
2019–2020	Viktoria Plzeň B	15	(0)
2021–2022	Bad Kötzting	27	(2)
2022–2023	AFK Slivenec		
2023–	TJ Slavoj Koloveč		

International career
2005	Slovakia U21	2	(0)
2007–2011	Slovakia	3	(1)

Managerial career
- 2019–2020: Viktoria Plzeň B (player-assistant)
- 2020–2021: Příbram (assistant)
- * Club domestic league appearances and goals as of 20:55, 17 September 2024 (UTC)

Peter Grajciar (born 17 September 1983) is a Slovak football midfielder who plays for Czech club TJ Slavoj Koloveč.

== Career ==
=== International career ===
His international debut came in second half of the Slovakia vs. Croatia friendly match on 16 October 2007.

=== Later career ===
In July 2019, Grajciar was appointed as a playing assistant manager for the B-team of FC Viktoria Plzeň under manager Pavel Horvath. He left the position on 10 March 2020 and joined 1. FK Příbram, once again under manager Pavel Horvath. They left the club one year later, in March 2021. During 2020, Grajciar also played for AFK Slivenec.

In July 2021, Grejciar joined German Landesliga Bayern-Mitte club 1. FC Bad Kötzting.

=== International goals ===
#	Date	Venue	Opponent	Score	Result	Competition
1.	17 November 2010	Pasienky, Bratislava, Slovakia	Bosnia and Herzegovina	2 – 3	2–3	Friendly match

== Honours ==
Slavia Prague

- Czech First League: 2008–09

Dinamo Tbilisi

- Georgian Premier League: 2012–13
- Georgian Cup: 2012–13
