= Martin Vaniak =

Czech footballer

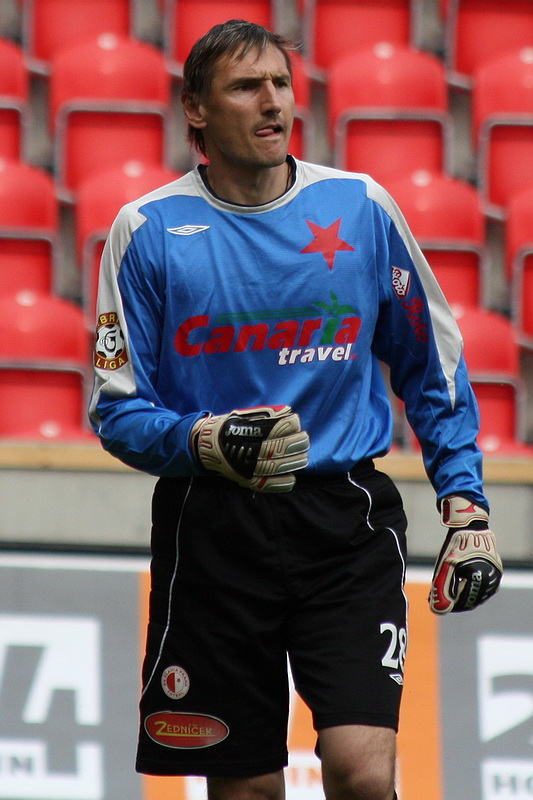

Personal information
- Date of birth: 4 October 1970 (age 56)
- Place of birth: Ústí nad Labem, Czechoslovakia
- Height: 1.93 m (6 ft 4 in)
- Position: Goalkeeper

Youth career
- 1977–80: Severotuk Ústí nad Labem
- 1980–88: Armaturka Ústí nad Labem

Senior career*
Years	Team	Apps	(Gls)
1988–1991	VTJ Hodonín	?	(?)
1991–1997	Sigma Olomouc	92	(0)
1997–2001	Petra Drnovice	111	(0)
2001–2005	Sigma Olomouc	119	(0)
2005–2006	Panionios	30	(0)
2006–2007	FK SIAD Most	26	(0)
2007–2011	SK Slavia Prague	92	(0)
Total		470	(0)

International career
2002–2004	Czech Republic	7	(0)
- * Club domestic league appearances and goals

Martin Vaniak (born 4 October 1970) is a Czech former footballer who played as a goalkeeper. He played for the Czech national team between 2002 and 2004. He played at club level for several teams, including FK Drnovice, Panionios in Greece, SK Sigma Olomouc and SK Slavia Prague.

In November 2010 he announced the end of his professional career. In January 2011 however, he changed his mind and stayed at Slavia. After the 2010/2011 season Vaniak however definitely finished his active career.
