= Petr Trapp =

Czech football player (born 1985)

Personal information
- Date of birth: 6 December 1985 (age 40)
- Place of birth: Most, Czechoslovakia
- Height: 1.86 m (6 ft 1 in)
- Position: Defensive midfielder

Youth career
- 1992–1998: 16. zákl. fotbalová škola v Mostě
- 1998–2002: FK Chmel Blšany
- 1999–2000: → MUS Most

Senior career*
Years	Team	Apps	(Gls)
2002–2006	FK Chmel Blšany	14	(0)
2004–2005	→ Havran Kryry (loan)		
2006–2008	FC Viktoria Plzeň	61	(4)
2009–2010	SK Slavia Praha	34	(4)
2011–2014	FC Viktoria Plzeň	20	(0)
2012–2013	→ 1. FK Příbram (loan)	19	(5)
2013–2014	→ Veria (loan)	24	(0)
2014–2015	Salam Zgharta	16	(1)
2015	Flamurtari Vlorë	6	(1)
2016	FC Nitra	10	(0)
2016–2017	1. FK Příbram	17	(0)

International career
2006	Czech Republic U-21	2	(0)
2011	Czech Republic	1	(0)
- * Club domestic league appearances and goals as of 20 March 2018

Petr Trapp (born 6 December 1985) is a Czech former football player. He debuted for the Czech senior squad on 4 June 2011 at the Kirin Cup against Peru.
