= Petr Janda (footballer) =

Czech footballer (born 1987)

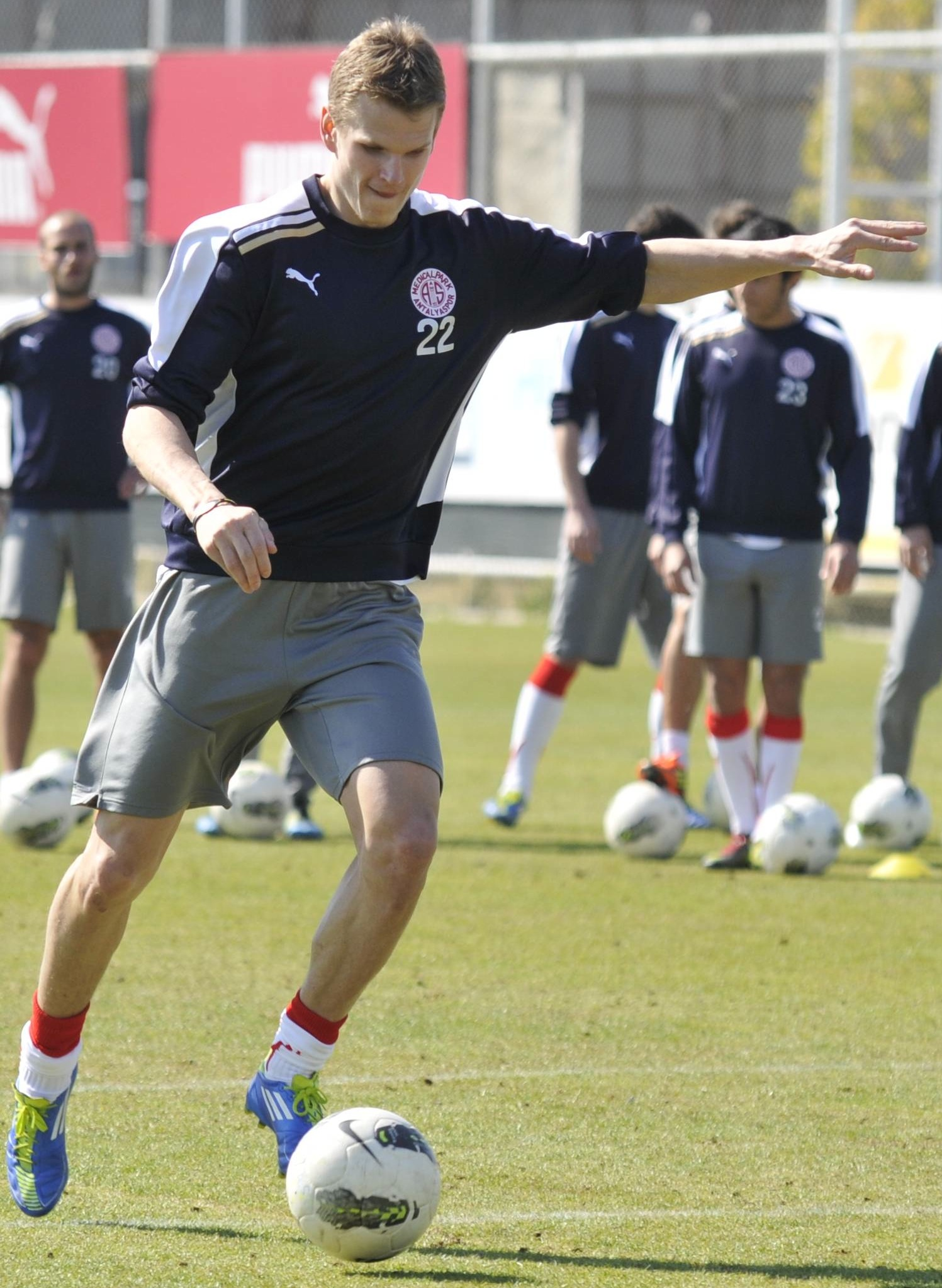
- Petr Janda, 2011

Personal information
- Full name: Petr Janda
- Date of birth: 5 January 1987 (age 39)
- Place of birth: Čáslav, Czechoslovakia
- Height: 1.84 m (6 ft 0 in)
- Positions: Winger; attacking midfielder

Youth career
- 1992–2000: Zenit Čáslav
- 2000–2002: Slovan Liberec
- 2002–2004: Zenit Čáslav
- 2004–2005: Slavia Prague

Senior career*
Years	Team	Apps	(Gls)
2005–2011	Slavia Prague	104	(6)
2012–2015	Antalyaspor	35	(0)
2014	→ Denizlispor (loan)	10	(2)
2015	Boluspor	4	(0)
2016–2019	TJ Sokol Čížová		
2020	TJ Blatná		

International career
2006–2008	Czech Republic U-21	6	(0)
2011	Czech Republic	2	(0)

Managerial career
- 2018–2019: TJ Sokol Čížová (player-assistant)
- * Club domestic league appearances and goals

Petr Janda (born 5 January 1987) is a Czech retired football player. He was also a regular for the Czech national under-21 football team.

== Career ==
Janda debuted for the Czech national football team against Peru at the 2011 Kirin Cup. He joined Antalyaspor on a 3.5 year contract on 28 January 2012.

In 2020, he moved to TJ Blatná after a few years at TJ Sokol Čížová, where he also functioned as an assistant coach. He left Blatná in the summer of 2020.

== Honours ==
Czech Rupublic U-21

- FIFA U-20 World Cup runner-up (1) 2007
