= Stanislav Vlček =

Czech footballer

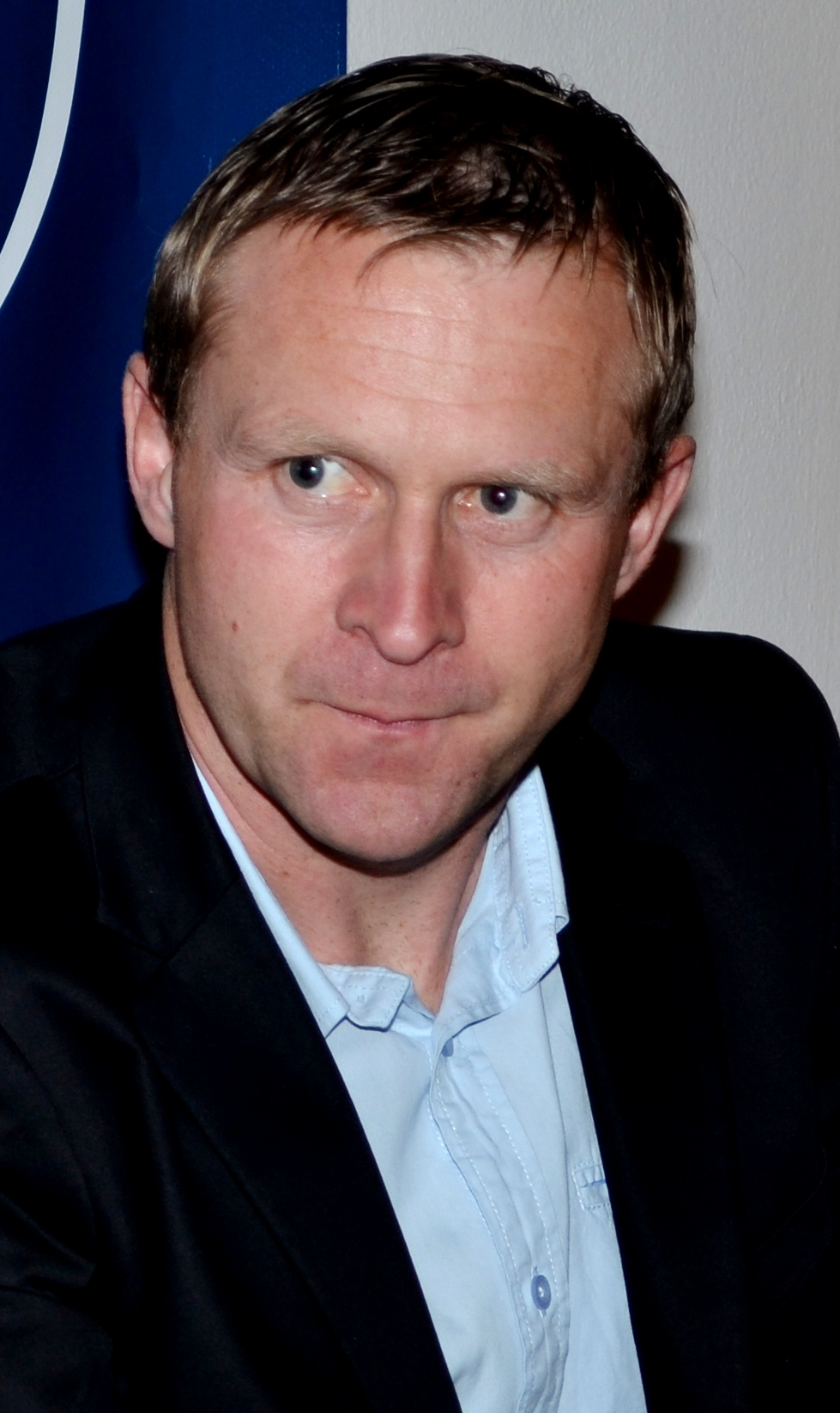
- Stanislav Vlček (2013)

Personal information
- Date of birth: 26 February 1976 (age 50)
- Place of birth: Vlašim, Czechoslovakia
- Height: 1.83 m (6 ft 0 in)
- Positions: Striker; winger

Senior career*
Years	Team	Apps	(Gls)
1992–1995	Bohemians Praha	62	(6)
1995–1997	České Budějovice	44	(2)
1997–2003	Sigma Olomouc	181	(42)
2004	Dynamo Moscow	15	(2)
2004–2007	Slavia Prague	85	(31)
2007–2009	Anderlecht	27	(10)
2009–2013	Slavia Prague	58	(6)
Total		472	(99)

International career
1996–1997	Czech Republic U-21	7	(1)
2000–2008	Czech Republic	14	(0)
- * Club domestic league appearances and goals

Stanislav Vlček (born 26 February 1976) is a Czech former footballer who played as a striker. He is best known for playing for Slavia Prague, Anderlecht and Dynamo Moscow.

== Career ==
Vlcek started his career with Bohemians Praha at the age of 17.

Vlček signed a contract with Anderlecht for 2,5 years on 21 December 2007. His previous club was Slavia Prague, where he returned on 16 April 2009. In 2012, he finished his career as a player, and became a scout for Slavia.

== Attributes ==
Vlček played for several clubs during his career and was primarily used as a striker. He was also capable of playing as a winger .

== International career ==
Vlček was capped 14 times for the Czech Republic national football team.
