= Adam Hloušek =

Czech professional footballer (born 1988)

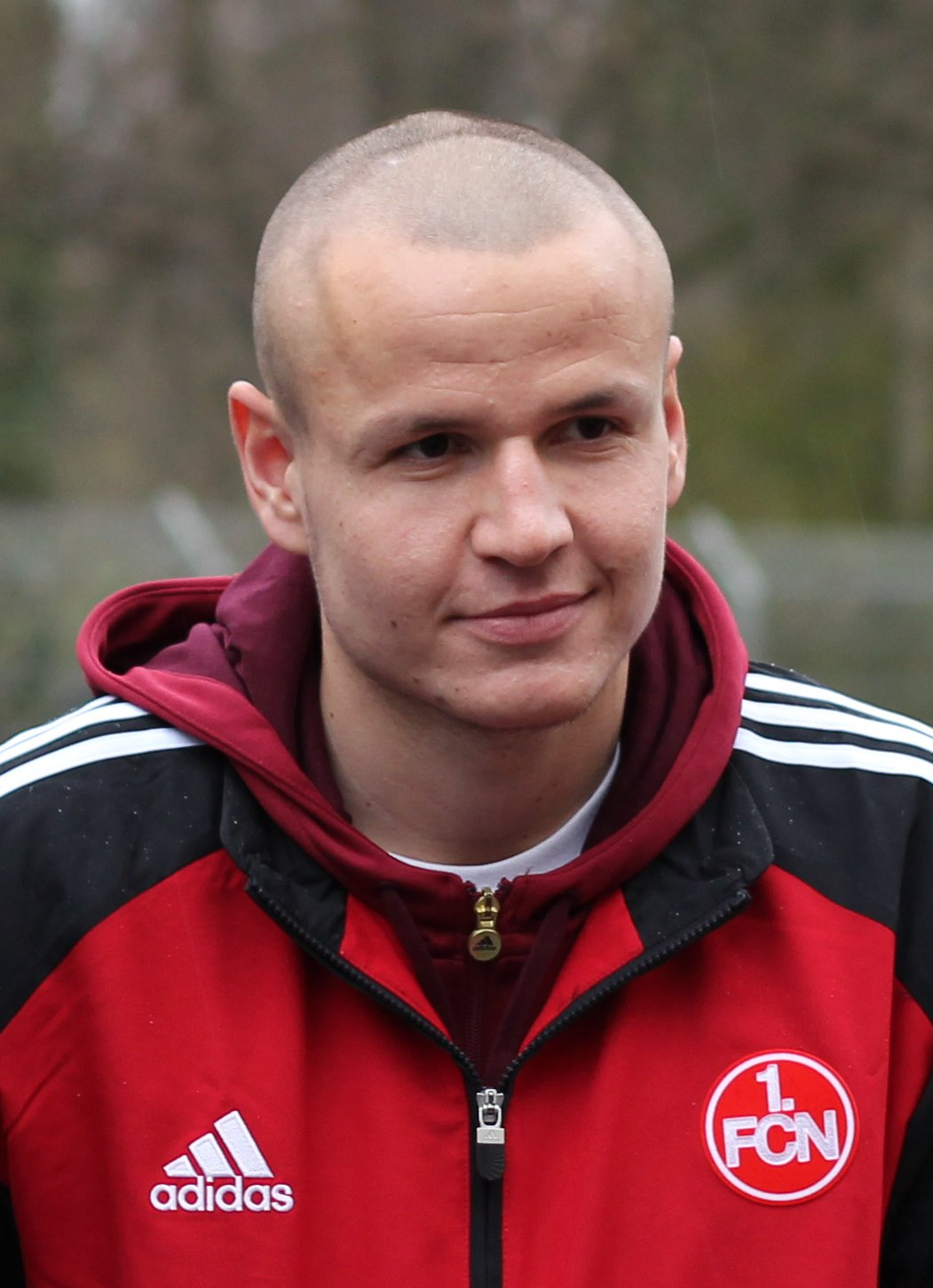
- Hloušek with 1. FC Nürnberg in 2012

Personal information
- Date of birth: 20 December 1988 (age 37)
- Place of birth: Turnov, Czechoslovakia
- Height: 1.87 m (6 ft 2 in)
- Positions: Left-back; left midfielder

Youth career
- 1993–1999: SK Semily
- 1999–2006: Jablonec

Senior career*
Years	Team	Apps	(Gls)
2006–2009	Jablonec	54	(5)
2009–2011	Slavia Prague	19	(3)
2011	→ 1. FC Kaiserslautern (loan)	13	(1)
2011	Jablonec	0	(0)
2011	→ Slavia Prague (loan)	11	(1)
2012–2014	1. FC Nürnberg	39	(3)
2013	1. FC Nürnberg II	6	(0)
2014–2016	VfB Stuttgart	29	(0)
2016–2019	Legia Warsaw	105	(5)
2019–2021	Viktoria Plzeň	18	(1)
2020–2021	→ 1. FC Kaiserslautern (loan)	26	(1)
2021–2022	Bruk-Bet Termalica	10	(0)
2022–2023	Trinity Zlín	9	(1)

International career^{‡}
2006	Czech Republic U18	6	(2)
2006–2007	Czech Republic U19	9	(1)
2008–2011	Czech Republic U21	7	(0)
2009–2015	Czech Republic	8	(0)
- * Club domestic league appearances and goals as of 7 January 2023 ‡ National team caps and goals as of 31 May 2015

Adam Hloušek (Czech pronunciation: [ˈadam ˈɦlouʃɛk]; born 20 December 1988) is a Czech professional footballer who plays as a left-back. He was also a member of the Czech Republic national team.

== Career ==
In 2009, Hloušek won the Talent of the Year award at the Czech Footballer of the Year awards.

For the 2014–15 season he moved to VfB Stuttgart. On 31 January 2016, he joined Legia Warsaw.

In August 2020, Hloušek returned to former club 1. FC Kaiserslautern, joining on loan from Viktoria Plzeň.

On 3 July 2021, he joined the Polish Ekstraklasa side Bruk-Bet Termalica Nieciecza. On 5 January 2022, he left the club by mutual consent.

In January 2022, Hloušek returned to the Czech First League, he joined FC Fastav Zlín.

== Honours ==
Legia Warsaw

- Ekstraklasa: 2015–16, 2016–17, 2017–18
- Polish Cup: 2015–16, 2017–18
