= 2009–10 UEFA Europa League qualifying =

This article details the 2009–10 UEFA Europa League qualifying phase and play-off round.

All times are CEST (UTC+2).

== Teams ==
This table shows the path of all 174 teams involved in the qualifying phase and play-off round, including the 15 losing teams from the Champions League third qualifying round which joined at the play-off round (marked by CL). 38 teams qualified for the group stage to join the 10 losing teams from the Champions League play-off round.

Key to colours
Winners of play-off round advanced to group stage

Play-off round
Team	Coeff.
(Germany) Werder Bremen	91.339
(Spain) Villarreal	80.853
(Ukraine) Shakhtar Donetsk	74.370
(Russia) Zenit Saint Petersburg	68.525
(Portugal) Benfica	64.292
(Spain) Valencia	59.853
(Netherlands) Ajax	54.826
(England) Everton	35.899
(Netherlands) Heerenveen	33.826
(Italy) Lazio	26.582
(Germany) Hertha BSC	26.339
(Czech Republic) Sparta Prague	25.150
(Romania) Dinamo București	25.781
(Greece) AEK Athens	25.633
(Czech Republic) Slavia Prague	25.150
(England) Aston Villa	23.899
(Serbia) Partizan	23.050
(Netherlands) Twente	17.826
(Croatia) Dinamo Zagreb	16.466
(Bulgaria) Litex Lovech	16.250
(France) Toulouse	14.033
(Romania) CFR Cluj	13.781
(Italy) Genoa	12.582
(Scotland) Heart of Midlothian	11.575
(Turkey) Trabzonspor	10.445
(France) Guingamp	10.033
(Russia) Amkar Perm	9.525
(Russia) Dynamo Moscow	9.525
(Ukraine) Vorskla Poltava	8.370
(Switzerland) Sion	8.050
(Belarus) BATE Borisov	7.733
(Portugal) Nacional	7.292
(Turkey) Sivasspor	6.445
(Belgium) Genk	6.065
(Czech Republic) Teplice	5.150
(Norway) Stabæk	3.760
(Slovakia) Slovan Bratislava	2.933
(Slovenia) Maribor	2.816
(Azerbaijan) Baku	0.899
(Estonia) Levadia Tallinn	0.866
(Kazakhstan) Aktobe	0.649

Third qualifying round
Team	Coeff.
(Italy) Roma	78.582
(Netherlands) PSV Eindhoven	75.826
(Germany) Hamburger SV	67.339
(Turkey) Fenerbahçe	52.445
(France) Lille	47.033
(Portugal) Braga	39.292
(Belgium) Club Brugge	34.065
Austria Wien	31.565
(Ukraine) Metalist Kharkiv	24.370
(Spain) Athletic Bilbao	23.853
(Israel) Hapoel Tel Aviv	18.050
(England) Fulham	15.899
(Bulgaria) CSKA Sofia	14.250
(Denmark) Odense	12.890
(Poland) Lech Poznań	12.583
(Czech Republic) Slovan Liberec	12.150
(Scotland) Aberdeen	11.575
(Russia) Krylia Sovetov Samara	11.525
(Romania) Vaslui	9.781
(Greece) PAOK	9.633
(Switzerland) Young Boys	6.050
(Norway) Vålerenga	4.760
(Norway) Fredrikstad	3.760
(Serbia) Vojvodina	3.050
(Cyprus) APOP Kinyras	3.016
(Sweden) IFK Göteborg	2.938
(Slovakia) Košice	2.933
(Croatia) Hajduk Split	2.466
(Slovenia) Interblock	1.816
(Hungary) Honvéd	1.633

Second qualifying round
Team	Coeff.
(Romania) Steaua București	53.781
(Switzerland) Basel	51.050
(Turkey) Galatasaray	33.445
(Denmark) AaB	24.890
(Serbia) Red Star Belgrade	12.050
(Denmark) Brøndby	10.890
(Ukraine) Metalurh Donetsk	10.370
(Slovakia) Žilina	8.933
(Norway) Tromsø	8.760
(Austria) Rapid Wien	8.565
(Portugal) Paços de Ferreira	8.292
(Netherlands) NAC Breda	7.826
(Greece) AEL	7.633
(Sweden) IF Elfsborg	6.938
(Scotland) Falkirk	5.575
(Bulgaria) Cherno More	5.250
(Belgium) Gent	5.065
(Czech Republic) Sigma Olomouc	4.150
(Poland) Legia Warsaw	3.583
(Austria) Sturm Graz	3.565
(Georgia (country)) Dinamo Tbilisi	3.332
(Serbia) Sevojno	3.050
(Israel) Maccabi Netanya	3.050
(Cyprus) Omonia	3.016
(Republic of Ireland) St Patrick's Athletic	2.899
(Republic of Ireland) Derry City	2.899
(Slovenia) HIT Gorica	2.816
(Croatia) Rijeka	2.466
(North Macedonia) Rabotnicki	2.033
(Finland) HJK	1.958
(Finland) Honka	1.958
(Lithuania) Sūduva	1.933
(Lithuania) Kaunas	1.933
(Latvia) Liepājas Metalurgs	1.832
(Latvia) Skonto	1.832
(Belarus) Naftan Novopolotsk	1.733
(Bosnia and Herzegovina) Slavija	1.733
(Bosnia and Herzegovina) Sarajevo	1.733
(Hungary) Újpest	1.633
(Moldova) Dacia Chișinău	1.333
(Moldova) Iskra-Stal	1.333
(Iceland) KR	1.333
(Liechtenstein) Vaduz	1.100
(North Macedonia) Milano	1.033
(Azerbaijan) Qarabağ	0.899
(Estonia) Flora	0.866
(Albania) Flamurtari	0.799
(Kazakhstan) Tobol	0.649
(Armenia) Gandzasar Kapan	0.599
(Wales) Bangor City	0.466
(Northern Ireland) Crusaders	0.433
(Faroe Islands) HB	0.433
(Luxembourg) Differdange 03	0.266
(Montenegro) Petrovac	0.200
(Andorra) FC Santa Coloma	0.100
(Malta) Sliema Wanderers	0.099
(San Marino) Juvenes/Dogana	0.050

First qualifying round
Team	Coeff.
(Norway) Rosenborg	28.760
(Cyprus) Anorthosis Famagusta	12.016
(Sweden) Helsingborgs IF	9.938
(Scotland) Motherwell	5.575
(Denmark) Randers	4.890
(Israel) Bnei Yehuda	3.050
(Slovakia) Spartak Trnava	2.933
(Poland) Polonia Warsaw	2.583
(Croatia) Slaven Belupo	2.466
(Finland) Lahti	1.958
(Lithuania) Vėtra	1.933
(Republic of Ireland) Sligo Rovers	1.899
(Latvia) Dinaburg	1.832
(Slovenia) Rudar Velenje	1.816
(Belarus) Dinamo Minsk	1.733
(Belarus) MTZ-RIPO Minsk	1.733
(Bosnia and Herzegovina) Široki Brijeg	1.733
(Hungary) Haladás	1.633
(Moldova) Zimbru Chișinău	1.333
(Iceland) Keflavík	1.333
(Iceland) Fram	1.333
(Georgia (country)) Olimpi Rustavi	1.332
(Georgia (country)) Zestaponi	1.332
(North Macedonia) Renova	1.033
(Azerbaijan) Inter Baku	0.899
(Azerbaijan) Simurq	0.899
(Estonia) Narva Trans	0.866
(Estonia) Nõmme Kalju	0.866
(Albania) Vllaznia	0.799
(Albania) Dinamo Tirana	0.799
(Kazakhstan) Irtysh	0.649
(Kazakhstan) Okzhetpes	0.649
(Armenia) Mika	0.599
(Armenia) Banants	0.599
(Wales) Llanelli	0.466
(Wales) The New Saints	0.466
(Northern Ireland) Linfield	0.433
(Northern Ireland) Lisburn Distillery	0.433
(Faroe Islands) B36	0.433
(Faroe Islands) NSÍ	0.433
(Luxembourg) Grevenmacher	0.266
(Luxembourg) Käerjéng 97	0.266
(Montenegro) Budućnost Podgorica	0.200
(Montenegro) Sutjeska	0.200
(Malta) Valletta	0.099
(Malta) Birkirkara	0.099

Notes

1. ^{CL-CP} Losing teams from the Champions League third qualifying round (Champions Path)
2. ^{CL-NCP} Losing teams from the Champions League third qualifying round (Non-Champions Path)

== First qualifying round ==
=== Seeding ===
The draw for the first qualifying round was held on 22 June 2009. Clubs were separated into seeded and unseeded teams based on their club coefficient; teams with a coefficient of at least 1.332 were seeded. In the draw, teams were split into five groups, each containing four or five seeded and unseeded teams.

Group 1		Group 2		Group 3	
Seeded	Unseeded	Seeded	Unseeded	Seeded	Unseeded
(Norway) Rosenborg; (Finland) Lahti; (Lithuania) Vėtra; (Belarus) MTZ-RIPO Minsk; (Hungary) Haladás	(Albania) Dinamo Tirana; (Kazakhstan) Irtysh; (Faroe Islands) NSÍ; (Luxembourg) Grevenmacher; (Montenegro) Sutjeska	(Cyprus) Anorthosis Famagusta; (Croatia) Slaven Belupo; (Republic of Ireland) Sligo Rovers; (Moldova) Zimbru Chișinău; (Georgia (country)) Olimpi Rustavi	(Albania) Vllaznia; (Kazakhstan) Okzhetpes; (Faroe Islands) B36; (Luxembourg) Käerjéng 97; (Malta) Birkirkara	(Sweden) Helsingborgs IF; (Poland) Polonia Warsaw; (Latvia) Dinaburg; (Iceland) Keflavík; (Georgia (country)) Zestaponi	(Estonia) Nõmme Kalju; (Armenia) Mika; (Northern Ireland) Lisburn Distillery; (Montenegro) Budućnost Podgorica; (Malta) Valletta
Group 4		Group 5			
Seeded	Unseeded	Seeded	Unseeded		
(Scotland) Motherwell; (Slovakia) Spartak Trnava; (Slovenia) Rudar Velenje; (Bosnia and Herzegovina) Široki Brijeg	(Azerbaijan) Inter Baku; (Estonia) Narva Trans; (Armenia) Banants; (Wales) Llanelli	(Denmark) Randers; (Israel) Bnei Yehuda; (Belarus) Dinamo Minsk; (Iceland) Fram	(North Macedonia) Renova; (Azerbaijan) Simurq; (Wales) The New Saints; (Northern Ireland) Linfield		

=== Summary ===
The first legs were played on 2 July, and the second legs were played on 9 July 2009.

Team 1	Agg.	Team 2	1st leg	2nd leg
Sutjeska (Montenegro)	2–3 (Note: Order of legs reversed after original draw)	(Belarus) MTZ-RIPO Minsk	1–1	1–2 (a.e.t.)
Lahti (Finland)	4–3	(Albania) Dinamo Tirana	4–1	0–2
Grevenmacher (Luxembourg)	0–6	(Lithuania) Vėtra	0–3	0–3
NSÍ (Faroe Islands)	1–6	(Norway) Rosenborg	0–3	1–3
Haladás (Hungary)	2–2 (a)	(Kazakhstan) Irtysh	1–0	1–2
Sligo Rovers (Republic of Ireland)	2–3	(Albania) Vllaznia	1–2	1–1
Olimpi Rustavi (Georgia (country))	4–0	(Faroe Islands) B36	2–0	2–0
Anorthosis Famagusta (Cyprus)	7–1	(Luxembourg) Käerjéng 97	5–0	2–1
Slaven Belupo (Croatia)	1–0	(Malta) Birkirkara	1–0	0–0
Zimbru Chișinău (Moldova)	3–2	(Kazakhstan) Okzhetpes	1–2	2–0
Lisburn Distillery (Northern Ireland)	1–11	(Georgia (country)) Zestaponi	1–5	0–6
Helsingborgs IF (Sweden)	4–2	(Armenia) Mika	3–1	1–1
Valletta (Malta)	5–2	(Iceland) Keflavík	3–0	2–2
Dinaburg (Latvia)	2–1	(Estonia) Nõmme Kalju	2–1	0–0
Budućnost Podgorica (Montenegro)	1–2	(Poland) Polonia Warsaw	0–2	1–0
Narva Trans (Estonia)	1–6	(Slovenia) Rudar Velenje	0–3	1–3
Motherwell (Scotland)	3–1	(Wales) Llanelli	0–1	3–0
Banants (Armenia)	1–2	(Bosnia and Herzegovina) Široki Brijeg	0–2	1–0
Spartak Trnava (Slovakia)	5–2	(Azerbaijan) Inter Baku	2–1	3–1
Dinamo Minsk (Belarus)	3–2	(North Macedonia) Renova	2–1	1–1
Randers (Denmark)	7–0	(Northern Ireland) Linfield	4–0	3–0
Simurq (Azerbaijan)	0–4	(Israel) Bnei Yehuda	0–1	0–3
Fram (Iceland)	4–2	(Wales) The New Saints	2–1	2–1

== Second qualifying round ==
=== Seeding ===
The draw for the second qualifying round was held on 22 June 2009, immediately after the first qualifying round draw. Clubs were separated into seeded and unseeded teams based on their club coefficient. Teams with a coefficient of at least 1.958 were seeded, except Lahti, the lowest ranked of the teams from Finland. As the draw for the second qualifying round took place before the first qualifying round was completed, the teams were seeded assuming the seeded side in the previous round would be victorious.

Seeded				Unseeded			
(Romania) Steaua București; (Switzerland) Basel; (Turkey) Galatasaray; (Norway) Rosenborg; (Denmark) AaB; (Serbia) Red Star Belgrade; (Cyprus) Anorthosis Famagusta; (Denmark) Brøndby; (Ukraine) Metalurh Donetsk; (Sweden) Helsingborgs IF	(Slovakia) Žilina; (Norway) Tromsø; (Austria) Rapid Wien; (Portugal) Paços de Ferreira; (Netherlands) NAC Breda; (Greece) AEL; (Sweden) IF Elfsborg; (Scotland) Falkirk; (Scotland) Motherwell; (Bulgaria) Cherno More	(Belgium) Gent; (Denmark) Randers; (Czech Republic) Sigma Olomouc; (Poland) Legia Warsaw; (Austria) Sturm Graz; (Georgia (country)) Dinamo Tbilisi; (Serbia) Sevojno; (Israel) Maccabi Netanya; (Israel) Bnei Yehuda; (Cyprus) Omonia	(Slovakia) Spartak Trnava; (Republic of Ireland) St Patrick's Athletic; (Republic of Ireland) Derry City; (Slovenia) HIT Gorica; (Poland) Polonia Warsaw; (Croatia) Rijeka; (Croatia) Slaven Belupo; (North Macedonia) Rabotnicki; (Finland) Honka; (Finland) HJK	(Finland) Lahti; (Lithuania) Kaunas; (Lithuania) Sūduva; (Lithuania) Vėtra; (Albania) Vllaznia; (Latvia) Liepājas Metalurgs; (Latvia) Skonto; (Latvia) Dinaburg; (Slovenia) Rudar Velenje; (Belarus) Naftan Novopolotsk	(Belarus) Dinamo Minsk; (Belarus) MTZ-RIPO Minsk; (Bosnia and Herzegovina) Slavija; (Bosnia and Herzegovina) Sarajevo; (Bosnia and Herzegovina) Široki Brijeg; (Hungary) Újpest; (Hungary) Haladás; (Moldova) Dacia Chișinău; (Moldova) Iskra-Stal; (Moldova) Zimbru Chișinău	(Iceland) KR; (Malta) Valletta; (Iceland) Fram; (Georgia (country)) Olimpi Rustavi; (Georgia (country)) Zestaponi; (Liechtenstein) Vaduz; (North Macedonia) Milano; (Azerbaijan) Qarabağ; (Albania) Flamurtari; (Estonia) Flora	(Kazakhstan) Tobol; (Armenia) Gandzasar Kapan; (Wales) Bangor City; (Northern Ireland) Crusaders; (Faroe Islands) HB; (Luxembourg) Differdange 03; (Montenegro) Petrovac; (Andorra) FC Santa Coloma; (Malta) Sliema Wanderers; (San Marino) Juvenes/Dogana

Notes

1. ^{†} Winners of the first qualifying round, whose identity was not known at the time of draw. Teams in italics defeated a team with a higher coefficient, thus effectively taking the coefficient of their opponent in the draw.

=== Summary ===
The first legs were played on 14 and 16 July, and the second legs were played on 23 July 2009.

Both the first and second legs between Bnei Yehuda and Dinaburg and between Rapid Wien and Vllaznia were under investigation by UEFA and German authorities for possible match-fixing.

Team 1	Agg.	Team 2	1st leg	2nd leg
Rosenborg (Norway)	0–1	(Azerbaijan) Qarabağ	0–0	0–1
Zimbru Chișinău (Moldova)	0–1 (Note: Order of legs reversed after original draw)	(Portugal) Paços de Ferreira	0–0	0–1
Juvenes/Dogana (San Marino)	0–5	(Poland) Polonia Warsaw	0–1	0–4
Sturm Graz (Austria)	3–2	(Bosnia and Herzegovina) Široki Brijeg	2–1	1–1
Basel (Switzerland)	7–1	(Andorra) FC Santa Coloma	3–0	4–1
Honka (Finland)	3–0	(Wales) Bangor City	2–0	1–0
Žilina (Slovakia)	3–0	(Moldova) Dacia Chișinău	2–0	1–0
Anorthosis Famagusta (Cyprus)	3–4	(Montenegro) Petrovac	2–1	1–3 (a.e.t.)
St Patrick's Athletic (Republic of Ireland)	2–1	(Malta) Valletta	1–1	1–0
Omonia (Cyprus)	8–1	(Faroe Islands) HB	4–0	4–1
HIT Gorica (Slovenia)	1–2	(Finland) Lahti	1–0	0–2
Sigma Olomouc (Czech Republic)	3–1	(Iceland) Fram	1–1	2–0
Legia Warsaw (Poland)	4–0	(Georgia (country)) Olimpi Rustavi	3–0	1–0
Falkirk (Scotland)	1–2	(Liechtenstein) Vaduz	1–0	0–2 (a.e.t.)
IF Elfsborg (Sweden)	3–0	(Hungary) Haladás	3–0	0–0
Rapid Wien (Austria)	8–0	(Albania) Vllaznia	5–0	3–0
Naftan Novopolotsk (Belarus)	2–2 (a)	(Belgium) Gent	2–1	0–1
Liepājas Metalurgs (Latvia)	3–4	(Georgia (country)) Dinamo Tbilisi	2–1	1–3
Differdange 03 (Luxembourg)	1–3	(Croatia) Rijeka	1–0	0–3
Sūduva (Lithuania)	1–2	(Denmark) Randers	0–1	1–1
Vėtra (Lithuania)	3–2	(Finland) HJK	0–1	3–1
Milano (North Macedonia)	2–12	(Croatia) Slaven Belupo	0–4	2–8
Dinamo Minsk (Belarus)	1–4	(Norway) Tromsø	0–0	1–4
KR (Iceland)	3–1	(Greece) AEL	2–0	1–1
Brøndby (Denmark)	4–2	(Estonia) Flora	0–1	4–1
AaB (Denmark)	1–3	(Bosnia and Herzegovina) Slavija	0–0	1–3
Steaua București (Romania)	4–1	(Hungary) Újpest	2–0	2–1
Metalurh Donetsk (Ukraine)	5–1	(Belarus) MTZ-RIPO Minsk	3–0	2–1
Crusaders (Northern Ireland)	3–5	(North Macedonia) Rabotnicki	1–1	2–4
Bnei Yehuda (Israel)	5–0	(Latvia) Dinaburg	4–0	1–0
NAC Breda (Netherlands)	8–0	(Armenia) Gandzasar Kapan	6–0	2–0
Cherno More (Bulgaria)	4–0	(Moldova) Iskra-Stal	1–0	3–0
Sevojno (Serbia)	1–1 (a)	(Lithuania) Kaunas	0–0	1–1
Flamurtari (Albania)	2–8	(Scotland) Motherwell	1–0	1–8
Zestaponi (Georgia (country))	3–4	(Sweden) Helsingborgs IF	1–2	2–2 (a.e.t.)
Skonto (Latvia)	1–2	(Republic of Ireland) Derry City	1–1	0–1
Sliema Wanderers (Malta)	0–3	(Israel) Maccabi Netanya	0–0	0–3
Tobol (Kazakhstan)	1–3	(Turkey) Galatasaray	1–1	0–2
Rudar Velenje (Slovenia)	0–5	(Serbia) Red Star Belgrade	0–1	0–4
Sarajevo (Bosnia and Herzegovina)	2–1	(Slovakia) Spartak Trnava	1–0	1–1

== Third qualifying round ==
=== Seeding ===
The draw for the third qualifying round was held on 17 July 2009. Clubs were separated into seven groups of seeded and unseeded teams based on their club coefficient; teams with a coefficient of at least 7.826 were seeded. As the draw for the third qualifying round took place before the second qualifying round was completed, the teams were seeded assuming the seeded side in the previous round would be victorious. As a result, Qarabağ, Petrovac and Slavija were also seeded as they beat teams who would have been seeded.

Group 1		Group 2		Group 3		Group 4	
Seeded	Unseeded	Seeded	Unseeded	Seeded	Unseeded	Seeded	Unseeded
(Italy) Roma; (Ukraine) Metalist Kharkiv; (Poland) Lech Poznań; (Sweden) Helsingborgs IF; (Romania) Vaslui	(Belgium) Gent; (Norway) Fredrikstad; (Cyprus) Omonia; (Bosnia and Herzegovina) Sarajevo; (Croatia) Rijeka	(Netherlands) PSV Eindhoven; (Bosnia and Herzegovina) Slavija; (Israel) Hapoel Tel Aviv; (Ukraine) Metalurh Donetsk; (Greece) PAOK	(Bulgaria) Cherno More; (Norway) Vålerenga; (Sweden) IFK Göteborg; (Slovakia) Košice; (Slovenia) Interblock	(Germany) Hamburger SV; (Azerbaijan) Qarabağ; (Czech Republic) Slovan Liberec; (Russia) Krylia Sovetov Samara; (Austria) Rapid Wien	(Liechtenstein) Vaduz; (Denmark) Randers; (Cyprus) APOP Kinyras; (Republic of Ireland) St Patrick's Athletic; (Finland) Honka	(Romania) Steaua București; Austria Wien; (Bulgaria) CSKA Sofia; (Denmark) Brøndby; (Norway) Tromsø	(Scotland) Motherwell; (Poland) Legia Warsaw; (Serbia) Vojvodina; (Republic of Ireland) Derry City; (Croatia) Slaven Belupo
Group 5		Group 6		Group 7			
Seeded	Unseeded	Seeded	Unseeded	Seeded	Unseeded		
(France) Lille; (Portugal) Braga; (Denmark) Odense; (Scotland) Aberdeen; (Slovakia) Žilina	(Sweden) IF Elfsborg; (Czech Republic) Sigma Olomouc; (Serbia) Sevojno; (Croatia) Hajduk Split; (North Macedonia) Rabotnicki	(Turkey) Fenerbahçe; (Belgium) Club Brugge; (Spain) Athletic Bilbao; (Montenegro) Petrovac; (Portugal) Paços de Ferreira	(Switzerland) Young Boys; (Austria) Sturm Graz; (Israel) Bnei Yehuda; (Finland) Lahti; (Hungary) Honvéd	(Switzerland) Basel; (Turkey) Galatasaray; (England) Fulham; (Serbia) Red Star Belgrade; (Netherlands) NAC Breda	(Iceland) KR; (Georgia (country)) Dinamo Tbilisi; (Israel) Maccabi Netanya; (Poland) Polonia Warsaw; (Lithuania) Vėtra		

Notes

1. ^{†} Winners of the second qualifying round, whose identity was not known at the time of draw. Teams in italics defeated a team with a higher coefficient, thus effectively taking the coefficient of their opponent in the draw.

=== Summary ===
The first legs were played on 28 and 30 July, and the second legs were played on 4 and 6 August 2009.

The first leg between Fenerbahçe and Honvéd and the second leg between Interblock and Metalurh Donetsk were under investigation by UEFA and German authorities for possible match-fixing.

Team 1	Agg.	Team 2	1st leg	2nd leg
Helsingborgs IF (Sweden)	3–3 (4–5 p) (Note: Order of legs reversed after original draw)	(Bosnia and Herzegovina) Sarajevo	2–1	1–2 (a.e.t.)
Fredrikstad (Norway)	3–7	(Poland) Lech Poznań	1–6	2–1
Rijeka (Croatia)	1–4	(Ukraine) Metalist Kharkiv	1–2	0–2
Roma (Italy)	10–2	(Belgium) Gent	3–1	7–1
Vaslui (Romania)	3–1	(Cyprus) Omonia	2–0	1–1
Slavija (Bosnia and Herzegovina)	1–5	(Slovakia) Košice	0–2	1–3
IFK Göteborg (Sweden)	2–4	(Israel) Hapoel Tel Aviv	1–3	1–1
PSV Eindhoven (Netherlands)	2–0	(Bulgaria) Cherno More	1–0	1–0
Metalurh Donetsk (Ukraine)	5–0	(Slovenia) Interblock	2–0	3–0
Vålerenga (Norway)	2–2 (a)	(Greece) PAOK	1–2	1–0
Rapid Wien (Austria)	4–3	(Cyprus) APOP Kinyras	2–1	2–2 (a.e.t.)
Honka (Finland)	1–3	(Azerbaijan) Qarabağ	0–1	1–2
Vaduz (Liechtenstein)	0–3	(Czech Republic) Slovan Liberec	0–1	0–2
St Patrick's Athletic (Republic of Ireland)	3–3 (a)	(Russia) Krylia Sovetov Samara	1–0	2–3
Randers (Denmark)	1–4	(Germany) Hamburger SV	0–4	1–0
Tromsø (Norway)	4–1	(Croatia) Slaven Belupo	2–1	2–0
Brøndby (Denmark)	3–3 (a)	(Poland) Legia Warsaw	1–1	2–2
Vojvodina (Serbia)	3–5	Austria Wien	1–1	2–4
CSKA Sofia (Bulgaria)	2–1	(Republic of Ireland) Derry City	1–0	1–1
Steaua București (Romania)	6–1	(Scotland) Motherwell	3–0	3–1
Žilina (Slovakia)	2–1	(Croatia) Hajduk Split	1–1	1–0
Braga (Portugal)	1–4	(Sweden) IF Elfsborg	1–2	0–2
Aberdeen (Scotland)	1–8	(Czech Republic) Sigma Olomouc	1–5	0–3
Rabotnicki (North Macedonia)	3–7	(Denmark) Odense	3–4	0–3
Sevojno (Serbia)	0–4	(France) Lille	0–2	0–2
Petrovac (Montenegro)	1–7	(Austria) Sturm Graz	1–2	0–5
Fenerbahçe (Turkey)	6–2	(Hungary) Honvéd	5–1	1–1
Bnei Yehuda (Israel)	2–0	(Portugal) Paços de Ferreira	1–0	1–0
Club Brugge (Belgium)	4–3	(Finland) Lahti	3–2	1–1
Athletic Bilbao (Spain)	2–2 (a)	(Switzerland) Young Boys	0–1	2–1
KR (Iceland)	3–5	(Switzerland) Basel	2–2	1–3
Maccabi Netanya (Israel)	1–10	(Turkey) Galatasaray	1–4	0–6
Dinamo Tbilisi (Georgia (country))	4–5	(Serbia) Red Star Belgrade	2–0	2–5
Polonia Warsaw (Poland)	1–4	(Netherlands) NAC Breda	0–1	1–3
Vėtra (Lithuania)	0–6	(England) Fulham	0–3	0–3

== Play-off round ==
=== Seeding ===
The draw for the play-off round was held on 7 August 2009. For the draw, clubs were separated into eight groups of seeded and unseeded teams based on their club coefficient. Teams with a coefficient of at least 12.890 were seeded.

Group 1		Group 2		Group 3		Group 4	
Seeded	Unseeded	Seeded	Unseeded	Seeded	Unseeded	Seeded	Unseeded
(Germany) Werder Bremen; (England) Everton; (Netherlands) Heerenveen; (Croatia) Dinamo Zagreb; (Bulgaria) Litex Lovech	(Scotland) Heart of Midlothian; (Greece) PAOK; (Belarus) BATE Borisov; (Czech Republic) Sigma Olomouc; (Kazakhstan) Aktobe	(Spain) Villarreal; (Belgium) Club Brugge; (Turkey) Galatasaray; (Israel) Hapoel Tel Aviv; (England) Fulham	(Poland) Lech Poznań; (Russia) Amkar Perm; (Netherlands) NAC Breda; (Czech Republic) Teplice; (Estonia) Levadia Tallinn	(Italy) Roma; (France) Lille; Austria Wien; (Netherlands) Twente; (Bulgaria) CSKA Sofia	(Ukraine) Metalurh Donetsk; (Russia) Dynamo Moscow; (Belgium) Genk; (Slovakia) Košice; (Azerbaijan) Qarabağ	(Netherlands) PSV Eindhoven; (Switzerland) Basel; (Italy) Lazio; (Serbia) Partizan; (France) Toulouse	(Turkey) Trabzonspor; (Slovakia) Žilina; (Sweden) IF Elfsborg; (Israel) Bnei Yehuda; (Azerbaijan) Baku
Group 5		Group 6		Group 7		Group 8	
Seeded	Unseeded	Seeded	Unseeded	Seeded	Unseeded	Seeded	Unseeded
(Ukraine) Shakhtar Donetsk; (Netherlands) Ajax; (Germany) Hertha BSC; (Spain) Athletic Bilbao; (Romania) CFR Cluj	(Denmark) Brøndby; (Norway) Tromsø; (Turkey) Sivasspor; (Slovakia) Slovan Bratislava; (Bosnia and Herzegovina) Sarajevo	(Russia) Zenit Saint Petersburg; (Romania) Steaua București; (Czech Republic) Sparta Prague; (England) Aston Villa; (Denmark) Odense	(Italy) Genoa; (Austria) Rapid Wien; (Portugal) Nacional; (Republic of Ireland) St Patrick's Athletic; (Slovenia) Maribor	(Germany) Hamburger SV; (Turkey) Fenerbahçe; (Romania) Dinamo București; (Ukraine) Metalist Kharkiv	(Czech Republic) Slovan Liberec; (France) Guingamp; (Switzerland) Sion; (Austria) Sturm Graz	(Portugal) Benfica; (Spain) Valencia; (Greece) AEK Athens; (Czech Republic) Slavia Prague	(Serbia) Red Star Belgrade; (Romania) Vaslui; (Ukraine) Vorskla Poltava; (Norway) Stabæk

=== Summary ===
The first legs were played on 20 August, and the second legs were played on 25 and 27 August 2009.

Team 1	Agg.	Team 2	1st leg	2nd leg
PAOK (Greece)	1–1 (a)	(Netherlands) Heerenveen	1–1	0–0
Dinamo Zagreb (Croatia)	4–2	(Scotland) Heart of Midlothian	4–0	0–2
Werder Bremen (Germany)	8–3	(Kazakhstan) Aktobe	6–3	2–0
Everton (England)	5–1	(Czech Republic) Sigma Olomouc	4–0	1–1
BATE Borisov (Belarus)	4–1	(Bulgaria) Litex Lovech	0–1	4–0 (a.e.t.)
NAC Breda (Netherlands)	2–9	(Spain) Villarreal	1–3	1–6
Lech Poznań (Poland)	1–1 (3–4 p)	(Belgium) Club Brugge	1–0	0–1 (a.e.t.)
Fulham (England)	3–2	(Russia) Amkar Perm	3–1	0–1
Galatasaray (Turkey)	6–1	(Estonia) Levadia Tallinn	5–0	1–1
Teplice (Czech Republic)	2–3	(Israel) Hapoel Tel Aviv	1–2	1–1
Metalurh Donetsk (Ukraine)	4–5	Austria Wien	2–2	2–3 (a.e.t.)
Twente (Netherlands)	3–1	(Azerbaijan) Qarabağ	3–1	0–0
Košice (Slovakia)	4–10 (Note: Order of legs reversed after original draw.)	(Italy) Roma	3–3	1–7
CSKA Sofia (Bulgaria)	2–1	(Russia) Dynamo Moscow	0–0	2–1
Genk (Belgium)	3–6	(France) Lille	1–2	2–4
Bnei Yehuda (Israel)	0–2	(Netherlands) PSV Eindhoven	0–1	0–1
Lazio (Italy)	3–1	(Sweden) IF Elfsborg	3–0	0–1
Trabzonspor (Turkey)	2–3	(France) Toulouse	1–3	1–0
Partizan (Serbia)	3–1	(Slovakia) Žilina	1–1	2–0
Baku (Azerbaijan)	2–8	(Switzerland) Basel	1–3	1–5
Ajax (Netherlands)	7–1	(Slovakia) Slovan Bratislava	5–0	2–1
Sivasspor (Turkey)	0–5	(Ukraine) Shakhtar Donetsk	0–3	0–2
Brøndby (Denmark)	3–4	(Germany) Hertha BSC	2–1	1–3
Athletic Bilbao (Spain)	4–3	(Norway) Tromsø	3–2	1–1
Sarajevo (Bosnia and Herzegovina)	2–3	(Romania) CFR Cluj	1–1	1–2
Rapid Wien (Austria)	2–2 (a)	(England) Aston Villa	1–0	1–2
Steaua București (Romania)	5–1	(Republic of Ireland) St Patrick's Athletic	3–0	2–1
Maribor (Slovenia)	0–3	(Czech Republic) Sparta Prague	0–2	0–1
Nacional (Portugal)	5–4	(Russia) Zenit Saint Petersburg	4–3	1–1
Genoa (Italy)	4–2	(Denmark) Odense	3–1	1–1
Dinamo București (Romania)	3–3 (9–8 p)	(Czech Republic) Slovan Liberec	0–3 (Note: The match was abandoned at 0–2 in the 88th minute after one Dinamo București fan entered the playing field and other fans invaded the running track around the pitch. The UEFA Control and Disciplinary Body awarded a default 0–3 defeat against Dinamo during an emergency meeting on 25 August. After advancing to the group stage, Dinamo were punished by having their first two home matches in the group stage played behind closed doors.)	3–0 (a.e.t.)
Guingamp (France)	2–8	(Germany) Hamburger SV	1–5	1–3
Sion (Switzerland)	2–4	(Turkey) Fenerbahçe	0–2	2–2
Sturm Graz (Austria)	2–1	(Ukraine) Metalist Kharkiv	1–1	1–0
Slavia Prague (Czech Republic)	4–2	(Serbia) Red Star Belgrade	3–0	1–2
Benfica (Portugal)	5–2	(Ukraine) Vorskla Poltava	4–0	1–2
Vaslui (Romania)	2–4	(Greece) AEK Athens	2–1	0–3
Stabæk (Norway)	1–7	(Spain) Valencia	0–3	1–4
