= 2009–10 UEFA Europa League =

39th season of Europe's secondary club football tournament organised by UEFA

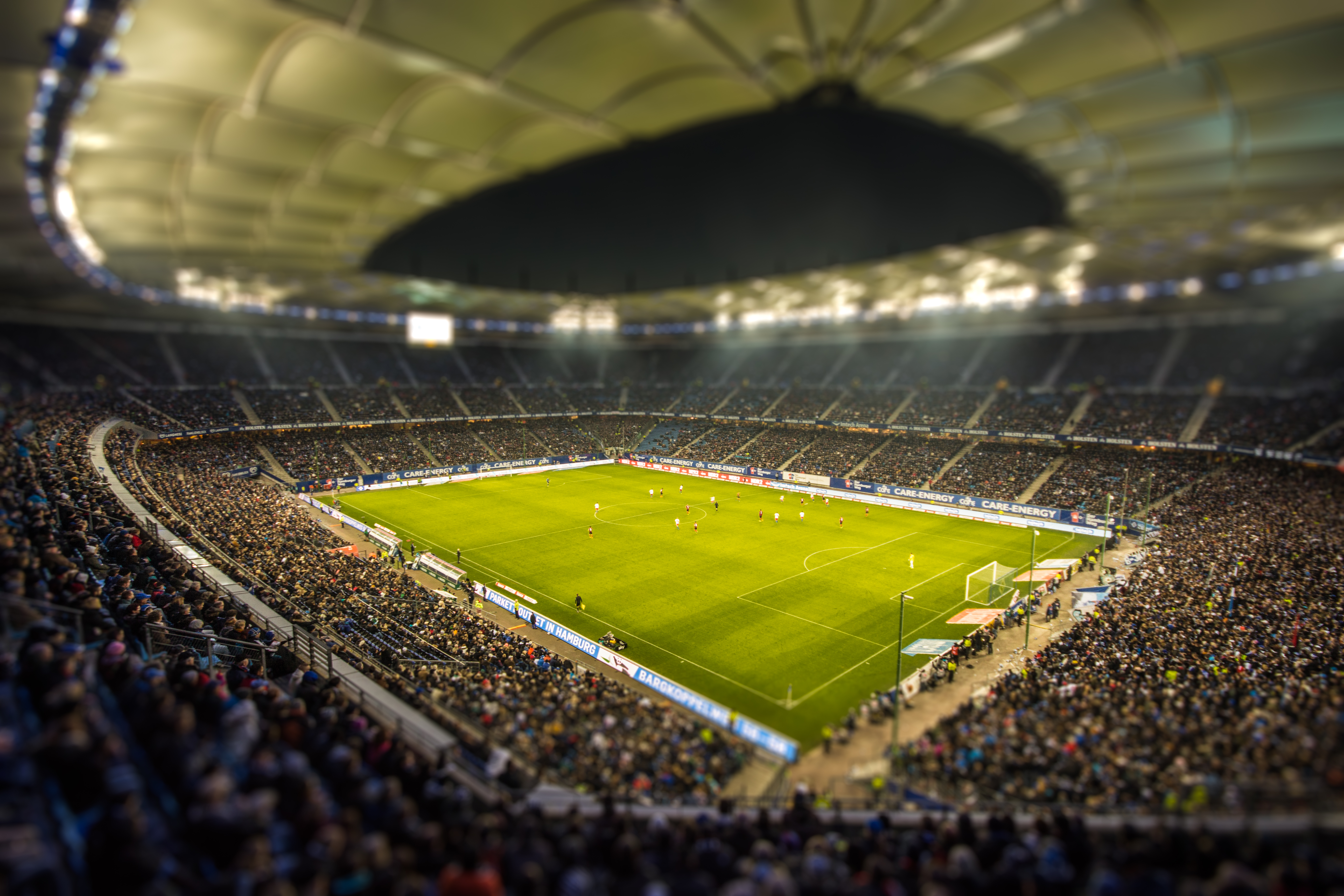
- The Volksparkstadion in Hamburg hosted the final

Tournament details
- Dates: 17 September 2009 – 12 May 2010 (competition proper); 2 July – 27 August 2009 (qualifying)
- Teams: 48+8 (competition proper); 159+33 (total) (from 53 associations)

Final positions
- Champions: (Spain) Atlético Madrid (1st title)
- Runners-up: (England) Fulham

Tournament statistics
- Matches played: 205
- Goals scored: 539 (2.63 per match)
- Top scorer(s): Claudio Pizarro (Werder Bremen); Óscar Cardozo (Benfica); 9 goals each

The 2009–10 UEFA Europa League was the first season of the UEFA Europa League, Europe's secondary club football tournament organised by UEFA. The competition was previously known as the UEFA Cup, which had been in existence for 38 years.

Spain's Atlético Madrid won the tournament for the first time, beating Fulham – who were playing in their first European final – at the Volksparkstadion, home ground of Hamburger SV, in Hamburg, Germany.

Shakhtar Donetsk were the defending champions, but were eliminated by eventual finalists Fulham in the round of 32.

== Association team allocation ==
A total of 192 teams from 53 UEFA associations participated in the 2009–10 UEFA Europa League. Associations were allocated places according to their 2008 UEFA country coefficient, which took into account their performance in European competitions from 2003–04 to 2007–08.

Below is the qualification scheme for the 2009–10 UEFA Europa League:

- Associations 1–6 each entered three teams
- Associations 7–9 each entered four teams
- Associations 10–51 each entered three teams, except Liechtenstein (it organised only a domestic cup competition and no domestic league competition)
- Associations 52–53 plus Liechtenstein each entered one team
- The top three associations of the 2008–09 UEFA Fair Play ranking each gained an additional berth
- Moreover, 33 teams eliminated from the 2009–10 UEFA Champions League were transferred to the Europa League

=== Association ranking ===
Rank	Association	Coeff.	Teams	Notes
1	England	75.749	3	+1(UCL)
2	Spain	75.266	3	+1(UCL)
3	Italy	60.410	3	+1(UCL)
4	France	52.668	3	+1(UCL)
5	Germany	48.722	3	+1(UCL)
6	Russia	43.750	3	+2(UCL)
7	Romania	40.599	4	+2(UCL)
8	Portugal	39.927	4	+1(UCL)
9	Netherlands	38.213	4	+1(UCL)
10	Scotland	33.375	3	+1(FP) +1(UCL)
11	Turkey	31.725	3	+1(UCL)
12	Ukraine	30.100	3	+1(UCL)
13	Belgium	26.700	3	+2(UCL)
14	Greece	25.831	3	+1(UCL)
15	Czech Republic	25.750	3	+2(UCL)
16	Switzerland	24.225	3	
17	Bulgaria	23.166	3	+1(UCL)
18	Norway	22.425	3	+1(FP) +1(UCL)

Rank	Association	Coeff.	Teams	Notes
19	Denmark	20.450	3	+1(FP) +1(UCL)
20	Austria	17.700	3	+1(UCL)
21	Serbia	16.750	3	+1(UCL)
22	Israel	15.750	3	
23	Sweden	13.691	3	
24	Slovakia	12.332	3	+1(UCL)
25	Poland	12.041	3	
26	Hungary	11.999	3	
27	Croatia	11.624	3	+1(UCL)
28	Cyprus	10.082	3	
29	Slovenia	9.915	3	+1(UCL)
30	Finland	9.623	3	
31	Latvia	8.831	3	+1(UCL)
32	Bosnia and Herzegovina	8.498	3	
33	Lithuania	7.999	3	
34	Moldova	7.499	3	+1(UCL)
35	Republic of Ireland	7.332	3	
36	Macedonia	6.331	3	

Rank	Association	Coeff.	Teams	Notes
37	Iceland	5.999	3	
38	Georgia	5.831	3	
39	Liechtenstein	5.500	1	
40	Belarus	5.332	3	+1(UCL)
41	Estonia	4.332	3	+1(UCL)
42	Azerbaijan	3.832	3	+1(UCL)
43	Albania	3.666	3	
44	Armenia	3.665	3	
45	Kazakhstan	2.582	3	+1(UCL)
46	Northern Ireland	2.332	3	
47	Wales	2.331	3	
48	Faroe Islands	1.832	3	
49	Luxembourg	1.498	3	
50	Malta	0.832	3	
51	Montenegro	0.500	3	
52	Andorra	0.500	1	
53	San Marino	0.250	1	

Notes

- (FP): Additional fair play berth (Norway, Denmark, Scotland)
- (UCL): Additional teams transferred from the UEFA Champions League

=== Distribution ===
Since the winners of the 2008–09 UEFA Cup, Shakhtar Donetsk, qualified for the 2009–10 UEFA Champions League through domestic performance, the title holder spot reserved for them in the group stage was vacated. As this was the first edition of the Europa League, it was initially unknown whether UEFA would simply disregard the vacant title holder spot and rearrange entries so that one more team would qualify from the play-off round, or replace the title holders' group stage place with that of the top-ranked association's cup winner and move teams from lower rounds appropriately, as the regulations were unclear on this matter. The former set-up was confirmed by UEFA's official list of participants, published on 16 June 2009. As a result, the following changes to the default allocation system were made to compensate for the vacant title holder spot in the group stage:

- The domestic cup winners of associations 16 and 17 (Switzerland and Bulgaria) were promoted from the third qualifying round to the play-off round.
- The domestic cup winners of associations 28 and 29 (Cyprus and Slovenia) were promoted from the second qualifying round to the third qualifying round.
- The domestic cup winners of associations 52 and 53 (Andorra and San Marino) and the domestic league runners-up of associations 35 and 36 (Republic of Ireland and Macedonia) were promoted from the first qualifying round to the second qualifying round.

	Teams entering in this round	Teams advancing from previous round	Teams transferred from Champions League
First qualifying round (46 teams)	14 domestic league runners-up from associations 37–51 (except Liechtenstein); 29 domestic league third-placed teams from associations 22–51 (except Liechtenstein); 3 teams which qualified via Fair Play rankings		
Second qualifying round (80 teams)	24 domestic cup winners from associations 30–53; 18 domestic league runners-up from associations 19–36; 6 domestic league third-placed teams from associations 16–21; 6 domestic league fourth-placed teams from associations 10–15; 3 domestic league fifth-placed teams from associations 7–9	23 winners from the first qualifying round	
Third qualifying round (70 teams)	12 domestic cup winners from associations 18–29; 3 domestic league runners-up from associations 16–18; 6 domestic league third-placed teams from associations 10–15; 3 domestic league fourth-placed teams from associations 7–9; 3 domestic league fifth-placed teams from associations 4–6 (League Cup winners for France); 3 domestic league sixth-placed teams from associations 1–3 (League Cup winners for England)	40 winners from the second qualifying round	
Play-off round (76 teams)	17 domestic cup winners from associations 1–17; 3 domestic league third-placed teams from associations 7–9; 3 domestic league fourth-placed teams from associations 4–6; 3 domestic league fifth-placed teams from associations 1–3	35 winners from the third qualifying round	15 losers from the Champions League third qualifying round
Group stage (48 teams)		38 winners from the play-off round	10 losers from the Champions League play-off round
Knockout phase (32 teams)		12 group winners from the group stage; 12 group runners-up from the group stage	8 third-placed teams from the Champions League group stage

=== Redistribution rules ===
A Europa League place was vacated when a team qualified for both the Champions League and the Europa League, or qualified for the Europa League by more than one method. When a place was vacated, it was redistributed within the national association by the following rules:

- When the domestic cup winners (considered as the "highest-placed" qualifier within the national association) also qualified for the Champions League, their Europa League place was vacated, and the remaining Europa League qualifiers were moved up one place, with the final place (with the earliest starting round) taken by the domestic cup runners-up, provided they did not already qualify for the Champions League or the Europa League. Otherwise, this place was taken by the highest-placed league finisher which did not qualify for the Europa League yet.
- When the domestic cup winners also qualified for the Europa League through league position, their place through the league position was vacated, and the Europa League qualifiers which finished lower in the league were moved up one place, with the final place taken by the highest-placed league finisher which did not qualify for the Europa League yet.
- A place vacated by the League Cup winners was taken by the highest-placed league finisher which did not qualify for the Europa League yet.
- A Fair Play place was taken by the highest-ranked team in the domestic Fair Play table which did not qualify for the Champions League or Europa League yet.

=== Teams ===
The labels in the parentheses show how each team qualified for the place of its starting round:

- TH: Title holders
- CW: Cup winners
- CR: Cup runners-up
- LC: League Cup winners
- Nth: League position
- P-W: End-of-season European competition play-off winners
- FP: Fair play
- UCL: Relegated from the Champions League
  - GS: Third-placed teams from the group stage
  - PO: Losers from the play-off round
  - Q3: Losers from the third qualifying round

Round of 32
(Italy) Juventus (UCL GS)	(Germany) VfL Wolfsburg (UCL GS)	(France) Marseille (UCL GS)	(Spain) Atlético Madrid (UCL GS)
(England) Liverpool (UCL GS)	(Russia) Rubin Kazan (UCL GS)	(Romania) Unirea Urziceni (UCL GS)	(Belgium) Standard Liège (UCL GS)
Group stage
(Romania) Timișoara (UCL PO)	(Portugal) Sporting CP (UCL PO)	(Scotland) Celtic (UCL PO)	(Belgium) Anderlecht (UCL PO)
(Greece) Panathinaikos (UCL PO)	(Bulgaria) Levski Sofia (UCL PO)	(Denmark) Copenhagen (UCL PO)	(Austria) Red Bull Salzburg (UCL PO)
(Latvia) Ventspils (UCL PO)	(Moldova) Sheriff Tiraspol (UCL PO)		
Play-off round
(England) Everton (5th)	(Russia) Zenit Saint Petersburg (5th)	(Belgium) Genk (CW)	(Slovenia) Maribor (UCL Q3)
(England) Aston Villa (6th)	(Romania) CFR Cluj (CW)	(Greece) AEK Athens (3rd)	(Belarus) BATE Borisov (UCL Q3)
(Spain) Villarreal (5th)	(Romania) Dinamo București (3rd)	(Czech Republic) Teplice (CW)	(Estonia) Levadia Tallinn (UCL Q3)
(Spain) Valencia (6th)	(Portugal) Benfica (3rd)	(Switzerland) Sion (CW)	(Azerbaijan) Baku (UCL Q3)
(Italy) Lazio (CW)	(Portugal) Nacional (4th)	(Bulgaria) Litex Lovech (CW)	(Kazakhstan) Aktobe (UCL Q3)
(Italy) Genoa (5th)	(Netherlands) Heerenveen (CW)	(Czech Republic) Slavia Prague (UCL Q3)	(Russia) Dynamo Moscow (UCL Q3)
(France) Guingamp (CW)	(Netherlands) Ajax (3rd)	(Norway) Stabæk (UCL Q3)	(Netherlands) Twente (UCL Q3)
(France) Toulouse (4th)	(Scotland) Heart of Midlothian (3rd)	(Serbia) Partizan (UCL Q3)	(Turkey) Sivasspor (UCL Q3)
(Germany) Werder Bremen (CW)	(Turkey) Trabzonspor (3rd)	(Slovakia) Slovan Bratislava (UCL Q3)	(Ukraine) Shakhtar Donetsk (UCL Q3)^{TH}
(Germany) Hertha BSC (4th)	(Ukraine) Vorskla Poltava (CW)	(Croatia) Dinamo Zagreb (UCL Q3)	(Czech Republic) Sparta Prague (UCL Q3)
(Russia) Amkar Perm (4th)			
Third qualifying round
(England) Fulham (7th)	(Netherlands) PSV Eindhoven (4th)	(Bulgaria) CSKA Sofia (2nd)	(Sweden) IFK Göteborg (CW)
(Spain) Athletic Bilbao (CR)	(Scotland) Aberdeen (4th)	(Norway) Vålerenga (CW)	(Slovakia) Košice (CW)
(Italy) Roma (6th)	(Turkey) Fenerbahçe (4th)	(Norway) Fredrikstad (2nd)	(Poland) Lech Poznań (CW)
(France) Lille (5th)	(Ukraine) Metalist Kharkiv (3rd)	(Denmark) Odense (2nd)	(Hungary) Honvéd (CW)
(Germany) Hamburger SV (5th)	(Belgium) Club Brugge (3rd)	Austria Wien (CW)	(Croatia) Hajduk Split (2nd)
(Russia) Krylia Sovetov Samara (6th)	(Greece) PAOK (4th)	(Serbia) Vojvodina (2nd)	(Cyprus) APOP Kinyras (CW)
(Romania) Vaslui (5th)	(Czech Republic) Slovan Liberec (3rd)	(Israel) Hapoel Tel Aviv (2nd)	(Slovenia) Interblock (CW)
(Portugal) Braga (5th)	(Switzerland) Young Boys (2nd)		
Second qualifying round
(Romania) Steaua București (6th)	(Austria) Sturm Graz (4th)	(Latvia) Skonto (3rd)	(Belarus) Naftan Novopolotsk (CW)
(Portugal) Paços de Ferreira (CR)	(Serbia) Red Star Belgrade (3rd)	(Bosnia and Herzegovina) Slavija (CW)	(Estonia) Flora (CW)
(Netherlands) NAC Breda (P-W)	(Serbia) Sevojno (CR)	(Bosnia and Herzegovina) Sarajevo (4th)	(Azerbaijan) Qarabağ (CW)
(Scotland) Falkirk (CR)	(Israel) Maccabi Netanya (4th)	(Lithuania) Sūduva (CW)	(Albania) Flamurtari (CW)
(Turkey) Galatasaray (5th)	(Sweden) IF Elfsborg (2nd)	(Lithuania) Kaunas (2nd)	(Armenia) Gandzasar Kapan (3rd)
(Ukraine) Metalurh Donetsk (4th)	(Slovakia) Žilina (2nd)	(Moldova) Dacia Chișinău (2nd)	(Kazakhstan) Tobol (2nd)
(Belgium) Gent (4th)	(Poland) Legia Warsaw (2nd)	(Moldova) Iskra-Stal (3rd)	(Northern Ireland) Crusaders (CW)
(Greece) AEL (5th)	(Hungary) Újpest (2nd)	(Republic of Ireland) St Patrick's Athletic (2nd)	(Wales) Bangor City (CW)
(Czech Republic) Sigma Olomouc (4th)	(Croatia) Rijeka (3rd)	(Republic of Ireland) Derry City (3rd)	(Faroe Islands) HB (2nd)
(Switzerland) Basel (3rd)	(Cyprus) Omonia (2nd)	(North Macedonia) Rabotnicki (CW)	(Luxembourg) Differdange 03 (2nd)
(Bulgaria) Cherno More (3rd)	(Slovenia) HIT Gorica (2nd)	(North Macedonia) Milano (2nd)	(Malta) Sliema Wanderers (CW)
(Norway) Tromsø (3rd)	(Finland) HJK (CW)	(Iceland) KR (CW)	(Montenegro) Petrovac (CW)
(Denmark) Brøndby (3rd)	(Finland) Honka (2nd)	(Georgia (country)) Dinamo Tbilisi (CW)	(Andorra) FC Santa Coloma (CW)
(Denmark) AaB (CR)	(Latvia) Liepājas Metalurgs (2nd)	(Liechtenstein) Vaduz (CW)	(San Marino) Juvenes/Dogana (CW)
(Austria) Rapid Wien (2nd)			
First qualifying round
(Israel) Bnei Yehuda (5th)	(Moldova) Zimbru Chișinău (4th)	(Azerbaijan) Simurq (3rd)	(Faroe Islands) B36 (3rd)
(Sweden) Helsingborgs IF (4th)	(Republic of Ireland) Sligo Rovers (4th)	(Albania) Vllaznia (2nd)	(Faroe Islands) NSÍ (4th)
(Slovakia) Spartak Trnava (3rd)	(North Macedonia) Renova (3rd)	(Albania) Dinamo Tirana (3rd)	(Luxembourg) Grevenmacher (3rd)
(Poland) Polonia Warsaw (4th)	(Iceland) Keflavík (2nd)	(Armenia) Mika (4th)	(Luxembourg) Käerjéng 97 (CR)
(Hungary) Haladás (3rd)	(Iceland) Fram (3rd)	(Armenia) Banants (CR)	(Malta) Birkirkara (2nd)
(Croatia) Slaven Belupo (4th)	(Georgia (country)) Olimpi Rustavi (3rd)	(Kazakhstan) Irtysh (3rd)	(Malta) Valletta (3rd)
(Cyprus) Anorthosis Famagusta (3rd)	(Georgia (country)) Zestaponi (4th)	(Kazakhstan) Okzhetpes (9th)	(Montenegro) Budućnost Podgorica (2nd)
(Slovenia) Rudar Velenje (3rd)	(Belarus) Dinamo Minsk (2nd)	(Northern Ireland) Linfield (2nd)	(Montenegro) Sutjeska (3rd)
(Finland) Lahti (3rd)	(Belarus) MTZ-RIPO Minsk (3rd)	(Northern Ireland) Lisburn Distillery (4th)	(Norway) Rosenborg (FP)
(Latvia) Dinaburg (4th)	(Estonia) Narva Trans (3rd)	(Wales) Llanelli (2nd)	(Denmark) Randers (FP)
(Bosnia and Herzegovina) Široki Brijeg (6th)	(Estonia) Nõmme Kalju (4th)	(Wales) The New Saints (3rd)	(Scotland) Motherwell (FP)
(Lithuania) Vėtra (3rd)	(Azerbaijan) Inter Baku (2nd)		

1. Armenia (ARM): Ararat Yerevan, which finished second in the 2008 Armenian Premier League, did not obtain a UEFA licence, so Gandzasar Kapan, which finished third, were moved up to the second qualifying round, while Mika, which finished fourth, took the first qualifying round spot.
2. Bosnia and Herzegovina (BIH): Sloboda Tuzla, which finished third in the 2008–09 Premier League of Bosnia and Herzegovina, did not obtain a UEFA licence, so Sarajevo, which finished fourth, were moved up to the second qualifying round. Borac Banja Luka, which finished fifth, also did not obtain a UEFA licence, so Široki Brijeg, which finished sixth, took the first qualifying round spot.
3. Israel (ISR): 2008–09 Israel State Cup winners Beitar Jerusalem (which also finished third in the 2008–09 Israeli Premier League) did not obtain a UEFA licence. Since Maccabi Haifa, the cup runners-up, qualified for the Champions League as the league champions, all three Israeli Europa League spots were redistributed based on league position, with second-placed Hapoel Tel Aviv moving up to the third qualifying round, fourth-placed Maccabi Netanya moving up to the second qualifying round, and fifth-placed Bnei Yehuda taking the first qualifying round spot.
4. Kazakhstan (KAZ): Almaty, the 2008 Kazakhstan Cup runners-up, merged with Megasport to form Lokomotiv Astana. However, the new club did not obtain a UEFA licence. Following the denied licence and withdrawal of three higher-placed teams in the 2008 Kazakhstan Premier League, Okzhetpes, which finished ninth, took the first qualifying round spot.
5. Latvia (LVA): Daugava Daugavpils, the 2008 Latvian Football Cup winners, merged with Dinaburg. Skonto, which finished third in the 2008 Latvian Higher League, were moved up to the second qualifying round, while Dinaburg, which finished fourth, took the first qualifying round spot.

== Round and draw dates ==
All draws held at UEFA headquarters in Nyon, Switzerland unless stated otherwise.

Phase	Round	Draw date	First leg	Second leg
Qualifying	First qualifying round	22 June 2009	2 July 2009	9 July 2009
Qualifying	Second qualifying round	22 June 2009	16 July 2009	23 July 2009
Qualifying	Third qualifying round	17 July 2009	30 July 2009	6 August 2009
Play-off	Play-off round	7 August 2009	20 August 2009	27 August 2009
Group stage	Matchday 1	28 August 2009 (Monaco)	17 September 2009	
Group stage	Matchday 2	28 August 2009 (Monaco)	1 October 2009	
Group stage	Matchday 3	28 August 2009 (Monaco)	22 October 2009	
Group stage	Matchday 4	28 August 2009 (Monaco)	5 November 2009	
Group stage	Matchday 5	28 August 2009 (Monaco)	2–3 December 2009	
Group stage	Matchday 6	28 August 2009 (Monaco)	16–17 December 2009	
Knockout phase	Round of 32	18 December 2009	18 February 2010	25 February 2010
Knockout phase	Round of 16	18 December 2009	11 March 2010	18 March 2010
Knockout phase	Quarter-finals	19 March 2010	1 April 2010	8 April 2010
Knockout phase	Semi-finals	19 March 2010	22 April 2010	29 April 2010
Knockout phase	Final	19 March 2010	12 May 2010 at Volksparkstadion, Hamburg	

== Qualifying rounds ==
In the qualifying phase and the play-off round, teams played against each other over two legs on a home-and-away basis.

=== First qualifying round ===
The first legs were played on 2 July, and the second legs were played on 9 July 2009.

Team 1	Agg.	Team 2	1st leg	2nd leg
Sutjeska (Montenegro)	2–3 (Note: Order of legs reversed after original draw)	(Belarus) MTZ-RIPO Minsk	1–1	1–2 (a.e.t.)
Lahti (Finland)	4–3	(Albania) Dinamo Tirana	4–1	0–2
Grevenmacher (Luxembourg)	0–6	(Lithuania) Vėtra	0–3	0–3
NSÍ (Faroe Islands)	1–6	(Norway) Rosenborg	0–3	1–3
Haladás (Hungary)	2–2 (a)	(Kazakhstan) Irtysh	1–0	1–2
Sligo Rovers (Republic of Ireland)	2–3	(Albania) Vllaznia	1–2	1–1
Olimpi Rustavi (Georgia (country))	4–0	(Faroe Islands) B36	2–0	2–0
Anorthosis Famagusta (Cyprus)	7–1	(Luxembourg) Käerjéng 97	5–0	2–1
Slaven Belupo (Croatia)	1–0	(Malta) Birkirkara	1–0	0–0
Zimbru Chișinău (Moldova)	3–2	(Kazakhstan) Okzhetpes	1–2	2–0
Lisburn Distillery (Northern Ireland)	1–11	(Georgia (country)) Zestaponi	1–5	0–6
Helsingborgs IF (Sweden)	4–2	(Armenia) Mika	3–1	1–1
Valletta (Malta)	5–2	(Iceland) Keflavík	3–0	2–2
Dinaburg (Latvia)	2–1	(Estonia) Nõmme Kalju	2–1	0–0
Budućnost Podgorica (Montenegro)	1–2	(Poland) Polonia Warsaw	0–2	1–0
Narva Trans (Estonia)	1–6	(Slovenia) Rudar Velenje	0–3	1–3
Motherwell (Scotland)	3–1	(Wales) Llanelli	0–1	3–0
Banants (Armenia)	1–2	(Bosnia and Herzegovina) Široki Brijeg	0–2	1–0
Spartak Trnava (Slovakia)	5–2	(Azerbaijan) Inter Baku	2–1	3–1
Dinamo Minsk (Belarus)	3–2	(North Macedonia) Renova	2–1	1–1
Randers (Denmark)	7–0	(Northern Ireland) Linfield	4–0	3–0
Simurq (Azerbaijan)	0–4	(Israel) Bnei Yehuda	0–1	0–3
Fram (Iceland)	4–2	(Wales) The New Saints	2–1	2–1

=== Second qualifying round ===
The first legs were played on 14 and 16 July, and the second legs were played on 23 July 2009.

Both the first and second legs between Bnei Yehuda and Dinaburg and between Rapid Wien and Vllaznia were under investigation by UEFA and German authorities for possible match-fixing.

Team 1	Agg.	Team 2	1st leg	2nd leg
Rosenborg (Norway)	0–1	(Azerbaijan) Qarabağ	0–0	0–1
Zimbru Chișinău (Moldova)	0–1 (Note: Order of legs reversed after original draw)	(Portugal) Paços de Ferreira	0–0	0–1
Juvenes/Dogana (San Marino)	0–5	(Poland) Polonia Warsaw	0–1	0–4
Sturm Graz (Austria)	3–2	(Bosnia and Herzegovina) Široki Brijeg	2–1	1–1
Basel (Switzerland)	7–1	(Andorra) FC Santa Coloma	3–0	4–1
Honka (Finland)	3–0	(Wales) Bangor City	2–0	1–0
Žilina (Slovakia)	3–0	(Moldova) Dacia Chișinău	2–0	1–0
Anorthosis Famagusta (Cyprus)	3–4	(Montenegro) Petrovac	2–1	1–3 (a.e.t.)
St Patrick's Athletic (Republic of Ireland)	2–1	(Malta) Valletta	1–1	1–0
Omonia (Cyprus)	8–1	(Faroe Islands) HB	4–0	4–1
HIT Gorica (Slovenia)	1–2	(Finland) Lahti	1–0	0–2
Sigma Olomouc (Czech Republic)	3–1	(Iceland) Fram	1–1	2–0
Legia Warsaw (Poland)	4–0	(Georgia (country)) Olimpi Rustavi	3–0	1–0
Falkirk (Scotland)	1–2	(Liechtenstein) Vaduz	1–0	0–2 (a.e.t.)
IF Elfsborg (Sweden)	3–0	(Hungary) Haladás	3–0	0–0
Rapid Wien (Austria)	8–0	(Albania) Vllaznia	5–0	3–0
Naftan Novopolotsk (Belarus)	2–2 (a)	(Belgium) Gent	2–1	0–1
Liepājas Metalurgs (Latvia)	3–4	(Georgia (country)) Dinamo Tbilisi	2–1	1–3
Differdange 03 (Luxembourg)	1–3	(Croatia) Rijeka	1–0	0–3
Sūduva (Lithuania)	1–2	(Denmark) Randers	0–1	1–1
Vėtra (Lithuania)	3–2	(Finland) HJK	0–1	3–1
Milano (North Macedonia)	2–12	(Croatia) Slaven Belupo	0–4	2–8
Dinamo Minsk (Belarus)	1–4	(Norway) Tromsø	0–0	1–4
KR (Iceland)	3–1	(Greece) AEL	2–0	1–1
Brøndby (Denmark)	4–2	(Estonia) Flora	0–1	4–1
AaB (Denmark)	1–3	(Bosnia and Herzegovina) Slavija	0–0	1–3
Steaua București (Romania)	4–1	(Hungary) Újpest	2–0	2–1
Metalurh Donetsk (Ukraine)	5–1	(Belarus) MTZ-RIPO Minsk	3–0	2–1
Crusaders (Northern Ireland)	3–5	(North Macedonia) Rabotnicki	1–1	2–4
Bnei Yehuda (Israel)	5–0	(Latvia) Dinaburg	4–0	1–0
NAC Breda (Netherlands)	8–0	(Armenia) Gandzasar Kapan	6–0	2–0
Cherno More (Bulgaria)	4–0	(Moldova) Iskra-Stal	1–0	3–0
Sevojno (Serbia)	1–1 (a)	(Lithuania) Kaunas	0–0	1–1
Flamurtari (Albania)	2–8	(Scotland) Motherwell	1–0	1–8
Zestaponi (Georgia (country))	3–4	(Sweden) Helsingborgs IF	1–2	2–2 (a.e.t.)
Skonto (Latvia)	1–2	(Republic of Ireland) Derry City	1–1	0–1
Sliema Wanderers (Malta)	0–3	(Israel) Maccabi Netanya	0–0	0–3
Tobol (Kazakhstan)	1–3	(Turkey) Galatasaray	1–1	0–2
Rudar Velenje (Slovenia)	0–5	(Serbia) Red Star Belgrade	0–1	0–4
Sarajevo (Bosnia and Herzegovina)	2–1	(Slovakia) Spartak Trnava	1–0	1–1

=== Third qualifying round ===
The first legs were played on 28 and 30 July, and the second legs were played on 4 and 6 August 2009.

The first leg between Fenerbahçe and Honvéd and the second leg between Interblock and Metalurh Donetsk were under investigation by UEFA and German authorities for possible match-fixing.

Team 1	Agg.	Team 2	1st leg	2nd leg
Helsingborgs IF (Sweden)	3–3 (4–5 p) (Note: Order of legs reversed after original draw)	(Bosnia and Herzegovina) Sarajevo	2–1	1–2 (a.e.t.)
Fredrikstad (Norway)	3–7	(Poland) Lech Poznań	1–6	2–1
Rijeka (Croatia)	1–4	(Ukraine) Metalist Kharkiv	1–2	0–2
Roma (Italy)	10–2	(Belgium) Gent	3–1	7–1
Vaslui (Romania)	3–1	(Cyprus) Omonia	2–0	1–1
Slavija (Bosnia and Herzegovina)	1–5	(Slovakia) Košice	0–2	1–3
IFK Göteborg (Sweden)	2–4	(Israel) Hapoel Tel Aviv	1–3	1–1
PSV Eindhoven (Netherlands)	2–0	(Bulgaria) Cherno More	1–0	1–0
Metalurh Donetsk (Ukraine)	5–0	(Slovenia) Interblock	2–0	3–0
Vålerenga (Norway)	2–2 (a)	(Greece) PAOK	1–2	1–0
Rapid Wien (Austria)	4–3	(Cyprus) APOP Kinyras	2–1	2–2 (a.e.t.)
Honka (Finland)	1–3	(Azerbaijan) Qarabağ	0–1	1–2
Vaduz (Liechtenstein)	0–3	(Czech Republic) Slovan Liberec	0–1	0–2
St Patrick's Athletic (Republic of Ireland)	3–3 (a)	(Russia) Krylia Sovetov Samara	1–0	2–3
Randers (Denmark)	1–4	(Germany) Hamburger SV	0–4	1–0
Tromsø (Norway)	4–1	(Croatia) Slaven Belupo	2–1	2–0
Brøndby (Denmark)	3–3 (a)	(Poland) Legia Warsaw	1–1	2–2
Vojvodina (Serbia)	3–5	Austria Wien	1–1	2–4
CSKA Sofia (Bulgaria)	2–1	(Republic of Ireland) Derry City	1–0	1–1
Steaua București (Romania)	6–1	(Scotland) Motherwell	3–0	3–1
Žilina (Slovakia)	2–1	(Croatia) Hajduk Split	1–1	1–0
Braga (Portugal)	1–4	(Sweden) IF Elfsborg	1–2	0–2
Aberdeen (Scotland)	1–8	(Czech Republic) Sigma Olomouc	1–5	0–3
Rabotnicki (North Macedonia)	3–7	(Denmark) Odense	3–4	0–3
Sevojno (Serbia)	0–4	(France) Lille	0–2	0–2
Petrovac (Montenegro)	1–7	(Austria) Sturm Graz	1–2	0–5
Fenerbahçe (Turkey)	6–2	(Hungary) Honvéd	5–1	1–1
Bnei Yehuda (Israel)	2–0	(Portugal) Paços de Ferreira	1–0	1–0
Club Brugge (Belgium)	4–3	(Finland) Lahti	3–2	1–1
Athletic Bilbao (Spain)	2–2 (a)	(Switzerland) Young Boys	0–1	2–1
KR (Iceland)	3–5	(Switzerland) Basel	2–2	1–3
Maccabi Netanya (Israel)	1–10	(Turkey) Galatasaray	1–4	0–6
Dinamo Tbilisi (Georgia (country))	4–5	(Serbia) Red Star Belgrade	2–0	2–5
Polonia Warsaw (Poland)	1–4	(Netherlands) NAC Breda	0–1	1–3
Vėtra (Lithuania)	0–6	(England) Fulham	0–3	0–3

== Play-off round ==
The first legs were played on 20 August, and the second legs were played on 25 and 27 August 2009.

Team 1	Agg.	Team 2	1st leg	2nd leg
PAOK (Greece)	1–1 (a)	(Netherlands) Heerenveen	1–1	0–0
Dinamo Zagreb (Croatia)	4–2	(Scotland) Heart of Midlothian	4–0	0–2
Werder Bremen (Germany)	8–3	(Kazakhstan) Aktobe	6–3	2–0
Everton (England)	5–1	(Czech Republic) Sigma Olomouc	4–0	1–1
BATE Borisov (Belarus)	4–1	(Bulgaria) Litex Lovech	0–1	4–0 (a.e.t.)
NAC Breda (Netherlands)	2–9	(Spain) Villarreal	1–3	1–6
Lech Poznań (Poland)	1–1 (3–4 p)	(Belgium) Club Brugge	1–0	0–1 (a.e.t.)
Fulham (England)	3–2	(Russia) Amkar Perm	3–1	0–1
Galatasaray (Turkey)	6–1	(Estonia) Levadia Tallinn	5–0	1–1
Teplice (Czech Republic)	2–3	(Israel) Hapoel Tel Aviv	1–2	1–1
Metalurh Donetsk (Ukraine)	4–5	Austria Wien	2–2	2–3 (a.e.t.)
Twente (Netherlands)	3–1	(Azerbaijan) Qarabağ	3–1	0–0
Košice (Slovakia)	4–10 (Note: Order of legs reversed after original draw.)	(Italy) Roma	3–3	1–7
CSKA Sofia (Bulgaria)	2–1	(Russia) Dynamo Moscow	0–0	2–1
Genk (Belgium)	3–6	(France) Lille	1–2	2–4
Bnei Yehuda (Israel)	0–2	(Netherlands) PSV Eindhoven	0–1	0–1
Lazio (Italy)	3–1	(Sweden) IF Elfsborg	3–0	0–1
Trabzonspor (Turkey)	2–3	(France) Toulouse	1–3	1–0
Partizan (Serbia)	3–1	(Slovakia) Žilina	1–1	2–0
Baku (Azerbaijan)	2–8	(Switzerland) Basel	1–3	1–5
Ajax (Netherlands)	7–1	(Slovakia) Slovan Bratislava	5–0	2–1
Sivasspor (Turkey)	0–5	(Ukraine) Shakhtar Donetsk	0–3	0–2
Brøndby (Denmark)	3–4	(Germany) Hertha BSC	2–1	1–3
Athletic Bilbao (Spain)	4–3	(Norway) Tromsø	3–2	1–1
Sarajevo (Bosnia and Herzegovina)	2–3	(Romania) CFR Cluj	1–1	1–2
Rapid Wien (Austria)	2–2 (a)	(England) Aston Villa	1–0	1–2
Steaua București (Romania)	5–1	(Republic of Ireland) St Patrick's Athletic	3–0	2–1
Maribor (Slovenia)	0–3	(Czech Republic) Sparta Prague	0–2	0–1
Nacional (Portugal)	5–4	(Russia) Zenit Saint Petersburg	4–3	1–1
Genoa (Italy)	4–2	(Denmark) Odense	3–1	1–1
Dinamo București (Romania)	3–3 (9–8 p)	(Czech Republic) Slovan Liberec	0–3 (Note: The match was abandoned at 0–2 in the 88th minute after one Dinamo București fan entered the playing field and other fans invaded the running track around the pitch. The UEFA Control and Disciplinary Body awarded a default 0–3 defeat against Dinamo during an emergency meeting on 25 August. After advancing to the group stage, Dinamo were punished by having their first two home matches in the group stage played behind closed doors.)	3–0 (a.e.t.)
Guingamp (France)	2–8	(Germany) Hamburger SV	1–5	1–3
Sion (Switzerland)	2–4	(Turkey) Fenerbahçe	0–2	2–2
Sturm Graz (Austria)	2–1	(Ukraine) Metalist Kharkiv	1–1	1–0
Slavia Prague (Czech Republic)	4–2	(Serbia) Red Star Belgrade	3–0	1–2
Benfica (Portugal)	5–2	(Ukraine) Vorskla Poltava	4–0	1–2
Vaslui (Romania)	2–4	(Greece) AEK Athens	2–1	0–3
Stabæk (Norway)	1–7	(Spain) Valencia	0–3	1–4

== Group stage ==
Location of teams of the 2009–10 UEFA Europa League group stage.
Red: Group A; Yellow: Group B; Green: Group C; Dark green: Group D;
Purple: Group E; Pink: Group F; Blue: Group G; Orange: Group H;
Brown: Group I; Deep pink: Group J; Cyan: Group K; Spring green: Group L.

The draw for the group stage was held at the Grimaldi Forum in Monaco on 28 August 2009. A total of 48 teams were drawn into twelve groups of four. Teams were divided into four pots, based on their club coefficient. Clubs from the same pot or the same association cannot be drawn into the same group.

A total of 24 associations were represented in the group stage. This was the first time teams from Latvia or Moldova qualified for the group stage of any European competition.

In each group, teams played against each other home-and-away. The matchdays were 17 September, 1 October, 22 October, 5 November, 2–3 December, and 16–17 December 2009. The top two in each group advanced to the knockout phase. If two or more teams are equal on points on completion of the group matches, the following criteria are applied to determine the rankings:

1. higher number of points obtained in the group matches played among the teams in question;
2. superior goal difference from the group matches played among the teams in question;
3. higher number of goals scored away from home in the group matches played among the teams in question;
4. superior goal difference from all group matches played;
5. higher number of goals scored;
6. higher number of coefficient points accumulated by the club in question, as well as its association, over the previous five seasons.

During this stage of the tournament, matches featured five on-field officials – with two additional officials monitoring play around the penalty area as part of a FIFA-sanctioned experiment.

=== Group A ===
Pos	Team	Pld	W	D	L	GF	GA	GD	Pts	Qualification	AND	AJX	DZ	TIM
1	(Belgium) Anderlecht	6	3	2	1	9	4	+5	11	Advance to knockout phase	—	1–1	0–1	3–1
2	(Netherlands) Ajax	6	3	2	1	8	6	+2	11	Advance to knockout phase	1–3	—	2–1	0–0
3	(Croatia) Dinamo Zagreb (Note: On 29 October 2009, UEFA's Control and Disciplinary Body ruled that Dinamo Zagreb would have to play their next two home matches in the UEFA Europa League behind closed doors due to the actions of their supporters in their match at Timișoara. They also deducted three points from the Croatian club's points tally in Group A. The club appealed, but the appeal was not heard until after the first closed-doors game against Ajax. After the appeal was heard, UEFA replaced the three-point deduction with a €75,000 fine, and a three-year suspended ban from European competition, while the two-match stadium ban remained unchanged.)	6	2	0	4	6	8	−2	6		0–2	0–2	—	1–2
4	(Romania) Timișoara	6	1	2	3	4	9	−5	5		0–0	1–2	0–3	—

Source: Soccerway

=== Group B ===
Pos	Team	Pld	W	D	L	GF	GA	GD	Pts	Qualification	VAL	LIL	GEN	SLV
1	(Spain) Valencia	6	3	3	0	12	8	+4	12	Advance to knockout phase	—	3–1	3–2	1–1
2	(France) Lille	6	3	1	2	15	9	+6	10	Advance to knockout phase	1–1	—	3–0	3–1
3	(Italy) Genoa	6	2	1	3	8	10	−2	7		1–2	3–2	—	2–0
4	(Czech Republic) Slavia Prague	6	0	3	3	5	13	−8	3		2–2	1–5	0–0	—

Source: Soccerway

=== Group C ===
Pos	Team	Pld	W	D	L	GF	GA	GD	Pts	Qualification	HTA	HSV	CEL	RAP
1	(Israel) Hapoel Tel Aviv	6	4	0	2	13	8	+5	12	Advance to knockout phase	—	1–0	2–1	5–1
2	(Germany) Hamburger SV	6	3	1	2	7	6	+1	10	Advance to knockout phase	4–2	—	0–0	2–0
3	(Scotland) Celtic	6	1	3	2	7	7	0	6		2–0	0–1	—	1–1
4	(Austria) Rapid Wien	6	1	2	3	8	14	−6	5		0–3	3–0	3–3	—

Source: Soccerway

=== Group D ===
Pos	Team	Pld	W	D	L	GF	GA	GD	Pts	Qualification	SCP	HER	HVN	VEN
1	(Portugal) Sporting CP	6	3	2	1	8	6	+2	11	Advance to knockout phase	—	1–0	1–1	1–1
2	(Germany) Hertha BSC	6	3	1	2	6	5	+1	10	Advance to knockout phase	1–0	—	0–1	1–1
3	(Netherlands) Heerenveen	6	2	2	2	11	7	+4	8		2–3	2–3	—	5–0
4	(Latvia) Ventspils	6	0	3	3	3	10	−7	3		1–2	0–1	0–0	—

Source: Soccerway

=== Group E ===
Pos	Team	Pld	W	D	L	GF	GA	GD	Pts	Qualification	ROM	FUL	BSL	CSK
1	(Italy) Roma	6	4	1	1	10	5	+5	13	Advance to knockout phase	—	2–1	2–1	2–0
2	(England) Fulham	6	3	2	1	8	6	+2	11	Advance to knockout phase	1–1	—	1–0	1–0
3	(Switzerland) Basel	6	3	0	3	10	7	+3	9		2–0	2–3	—	3–1
4	(Bulgaria) CSKA Sofia	6	0	1	5	2	12	−10	1		0–3	1–1	0–2	—

Source: Soccerway

=== Group F ===
Pos	Team	Pld	W	D	L	GF	GA	GD	Pts	Qualification	GAL	PAN	DB	STM
1	(Turkey) Galatasaray	6	4	1	1	12	4	+8	13	Advance to knockout phase	—	1–0	4–1	1–1
2	(Greece) Panathinaikos	6	4	0	2	7	4	+3	12	Advance to knockout phase	1–3	—	3–0	1–0
3	(Romania) Dinamo București	6	2	0	4	4	12	−8	6		0–3	0–1	—	2–1
4	(Austria) Sturm Graz	6	1	1	4	3	6	−3	4		1–0	0–1	0–1	—

Source: Soccerway

=== Group G ===
Pos	Team	Pld	W	D	L	GF	GA	GD	Pts	Qualification	SBG	VIL	LAZ	LS
1	(Austria) Red Bull Salzburg	6	6	0	0	9	2	+7	18	Advance to knockout phase	—	2–0	2–1	1–0
2	(Spain) Villarreal	6	3	0	3	8	6	+2	9	Advance to knockout phase	0–1	—	4–1	1–0
3	(Italy) Lazio	6	2	0	4	9	10	−1	6		1–2	2–1	—	0–1
4	(Bulgaria) Levski Sofia	6	1	0	5	1	9	−8	3		0–1	0–2	0–4	—

Source: Soccerway

=== Group H ===
Pos	Team	Pld	W	D	L	GF	GA	GD	Pts	Qualification	FEN	TWE	SHF	STE
1	(Turkey) Fenerbahçe	6	5	0	1	8	3	+5	15	Advance to knockout phase	—	1–2	1–0	3–1
2	(Netherlands) Twente	6	2	2	2	5	6	−1	8	Advance to knockout phase	0–1	—	2–1	0–0
3	(Moldova) Sheriff Tiraspol	6	1	2	3	4	5	−1	5		0–1	2–0	—	1–1
4	(Romania) Steaua București	6	0	4	2	3	6	−3	4		0–1	1–1	0–0	—

Source: Soccerway

=== Group I ===
Pos	Team	Pld	W	D	L	GF	GA	GD	Pts	Qualification	BEN	EVE	BTE	AEK
1	(Portugal) Benfica	6	5	0	1	13	3	+10	15	Advance to knockout phase	—	5–0	2–0	2–1
2	(England) Everton	6	3	0	3	7	9	−2	9	Advance to knockout phase	0–2	—	0–1	4–0
3	(Belarus) BATE Borisov	6	2	1	3	7	9	−2	7		1–2	1–2	—	2–1
4	(Greece) AEK Athens	6	1	1	4	5	11	−6	4		1–0	0–1	2–2	—

Source: Soccerway

=== Group J ===
Pos	Team	Pld	W	D	L	GF	GA	GD	Pts	Qualification	SHA	BRU	TOU	PTZ
1	(Ukraine) Shakhtar Donetsk	6	4	1	1	14	3	+11	13	Advance to knockout phase	—	0–0	4–0	4–1
2	(Belgium) Club Brugge	6	3	2	1	10	8	+2	11	Advance to knockout phase	1–4	—	1–0	2–0
3	(France) Toulouse	6	2	1	3	6	11	−5	7		0–2	2–2	—	1–0
4	(Serbia) Partizan	6	1	0	5	6	14	−8	3		1–0	2–4	2–3	—

Source: Soccerway

=== Group K ===
Pos	Team	Pld	W	D	L	GF	GA	GD	Pts	Qualification	PSV	FCK	PRA	CLU
1	(Netherlands) PSV Eindhoven	6	4	2	0	8	3	+5	14	Advance to knockout phase	—	1–0	1–0	1–0
2	(Denmark) Copenhagen	6	3	1	2	7	4	+3	10	Advance to knockout phase	1–1	—	1–0	2–0
3	(Czech Republic) Sparta Prague	6	2	1	3	7	9	−2	7		2–2	0–3	—	2–0
4	(Romania) CFR Cluj	6	1	0	5	4	10	−6	3		0–2	2–0	2–3	—

Source: Soccerway

=== Group L ===
Pos	Team	Pld	W	D	L	GF	GA	GD	Pts	Qualification	BRM	ATH	NCL	AUS
1	(Germany) Werder Bremen	6	5	1	0	17	6	+11	16	Advance to knockout phase	—	3–1	4–1	2–0
2	(Spain) Athletic Bilbao	6	3	1	2	10	8	+2	10	Advance to knockout phase	0–3	—	2–1	3–0
3	(Portugal) Nacional	6	1	2	3	11	12	−1	5		2–3	1–1	—	5–1
4	Austria Wien	6	0	2	4	4	16	−12	2		2–2	0–3	1–1	—

Source: Soccerway

== Knockout phase ==
In the knockout phase, teams played against each other over two legs on a home-and-away basis, except for the one-match final. The mechanism of the draws for each round was as follows:

- In the draw for the round of 32, the twelve group winners and the four third-placed teams from the Champions League group stage with the better group records were seeded, and the twelve group runners-up and the other four third-placed teams from the Champions League group stage were unseeded. The seeded teams were drawn against the unseeded teams, with the seeded teams hosting the second leg. Teams from the same group or the same association could not be drawn against each other.
- In the draws for the round of 16, quarter-finals, and semi-finals, there were no seedings, and teams from the same group or the same association could be drawn against each other. As the draws for the quarter-finals and semi-finals were held together before the quarter-finals were played, the identity of the quarter-final winners was not known at the time of the semi-final draw. A draw was also held to determine which semi-final winner was designated as the "home" team for the final (for administrative purposes as it was played at a neutral venue).

=== Bracket ===
Round of 32
(Belgium) Club Brugge	1	0	1
(Spain) Valencia (a.e.t.)	0	3	3
(Netherlands) Twente	1	1	2
(Germany) Werder Bremen	0	4	4
(Spain) Atlético Madrid	1	2	3
(Turkey) Galatasaray	1	1	2
(England) Everton	2	0	2
(Portugal) Sporting CP	1	3	4
(Germany) Hertha BSC	1	0	1
(Portugal) Benfica	1	4	5
(Denmark) Copenhagen	1	1	2
(France) Marseille	3	3	6
(France) Lille	2	1	3
(Turkey) Fenerbahçe	1	1	2
(England) Liverpool	1	3	4
(Romania) Unirea Urziceni	0	1	1
(Germany) Hamburger SV (a)	1	2	3
(Netherlands) PSV Eindhoven	0	3	3
(Spain) Athletic Bilbao	1	0	1
(Belgium) Anderlecht	1	4	5
(Greece) Panathinaikos	3	3	6
(Italy) Roma	2	2	4
(Belgium) Standard Liège	3	0	3
(Austria) Red Bull Salzburg	2	0	2
(Netherlands) Ajax	1	0	1
(Italy) Juventus	2	0	2
(England) Fulham	2	1	3
(Ukraine) Shakhtar Donetsk	1	1	2
(Russia) Rubin Kazan	3	0	3
(Israel) Hapoel Tel Aviv	0	0	0
(Spain) Villarreal	2	1	3
(Germany) VfL Wolfsburg	2	4	6

Round of 16
(Spain) Valencia (a)	1	4	5
(Germany) Werder Bremen	1	4	5
(Spain) Atlético Madrid (a)	0	2	2
(Portugal) Sporting CP	0	2	2
(Portugal) Benfica	1	2	3
(France) Marseille	1	1	2
(France) Lille	1	0	1
(England) Liverpool	0	3	3
(Germany) Hamburger SV	3	3	6
(Belgium) Anderlecht	1	4	5
(Greece) Panathinaikos	1	0	1
(Belgium) Standard Liège	3	1	4
(Italy) Juventus	3	1	4
(England) Fulham	1	4	5
(Russia) Rubin Kazan	1	1	2
(Germany) VfL Wolfsburg (a.e.t.)	1	2	3

Quarter-finals
(Spain) Valencia	2	0	2
(Spain) Atlético Madrid (a)	2	0	2
(Portugal) Benfica	2	1	3
(England) Liverpool	1	4	5
(Germany) Hamburger SV	2	3	5
(Belgium) Standard Liège	1	1	2
(England) Fulham	2	1	3
(Germany) VfL Wolfsburg	1	0	1

Semi-finals
(Spain) Atlético Madrid (a.e.t.; a)	1	1	2
(England) Liverpool	0	2	2
(Germany) Hamburger SV	0	1	1
(England) Fulham	0	2	2

Final
12 May – Hamburg
(Spain) Atlético Madrid (a.e.t.)	2
(England) Fulham	1

=== Round of 32 ===
The draw for the round of 32 took place on 18 December 2009. The first legs were played on 16 and 18 February, and the second legs were played on 23 and 25 February 2010.

Team 1	Agg.	Team 2	1st leg	2nd leg
Rubin Kazan (Russia)	3–0	(Israel) Hapoel Tel Aviv	3–0	0–0
Athletic Bilbao (Spain)	1–5	(Belgium) Anderlecht	1–1	0–4
Copenhagen (Denmark)	2–6	(France) Marseille	1–3	1–3
Panathinaikos (Greece)	6–4	(Italy) Roma	3–2	3–2
Atlético Madrid (Spain)	3–2	(Turkey) Galatasaray	1–1	2–1
Ajax (Netherlands)	1–2	(Italy) Juventus	1–2	0–0
Club Brugge (Belgium)	1–3	(Spain) Valencia	1–0	0–3 (a.e.t.)
Fulham (England)	3–2	(Ukraine) Shakhtar Donetsk	2–1	1–1
Liverpool (England)	4–1	(Romania) Unirea Urziceni	1–0	3–1
Hamburger SV (Germany)	3–3 (a)	(Netherlands) PSV Eindhoven	1–0	2–3
Villarreal (Spain)	3–6	(Germany) VfL Wolfsburg	2–2	1–4
Standard Liège (Belgium)	3–2	(Austria) Red Bull Salzburg	3–2	0–0
Twente (Netherlands)	2–4	(Germany) Werder Bremen	1–0	1–4
Lille (France)	3–2	(Turkey) Fenerbahçe	2–1	1–1
Everton (England)	2–4	(Portugal) Sporting CP	2–1	0–3
Hertha BSC (Germany)	1–5	(Portugal) Benfica	1–1	0–4

=== Round of 16 ===
The draw for the round of 16 took place on 18 December 2009, immediately after the round of 32 draw. The first legs were played on 11 March, and the second legs were played on 18 March 2010.

Team 1	Agg.	Team 2	1st leg	2nd leg
Hamburger SV (Germany)	6–5	(Belgium) Anderlecht	3–1	3–4
Rubin Kazan (Russia)	2–3	(Germany) VfL Wolfsburg	1–1	1–2 (a.e.t.)
Atlético Madrid (Spain)	2–2 (a)	(Portugal) Sporting CP	0–0	2–2
Benfica (Portugal)	3–2	(France) Marseille	1–1	2–1
Panathinaikos (Greece)	1–4	(Belgium) Standard Liège	1–3	0–1
Lille (France)	1–3	(England) Liverpool	1–0	0–3
Juventus (Italy)	4–5	(England) Fulham	3–1	1–4
Valencia (Spain)	5–5 (a)	(Germany) Werder Bremen	1–1	4–4

=== Quarter-finals ===
The draw for the quarter-finals was held on 19 March 2010. The first legs were played on 1 April, and the second legs were played on 8 April 2010.

Team 1	Agg.	Team 2	1st leg	2nd leg
Fulham (England)	3–1	(Germany) VfL Wolfsburg	2–1	1–0
Hamburger SV (Germany)	5–2	(Belgium) Standard Liège	2–1	3–1
Valencia (Spain)	2–2 (a)	(Spain) Atlético Madrid	2–2	0–0
Benfica (Portugal)	3–5	(England) Liverpool	2–1	1–4

=== Semi-finals ===
The draw for the semi-finals was held on 19 March 2010, immediately after the quarter-final draw. The first legs were played on 22 April, and the second legs were played on 29 April 2010. As a result of the disruption to air travel as a result of the eruptions of the Icelandic volcano Eyjafjallajökull, both English sides were forced to abandon their plans to fly for the first legs of their ties; Fulham undertook a coach journey from London to Hamburg, while Liverpool travelled by train to Paris, then subsequently by coach to Bordeaux before flying to Madrid.

Team 1	Agg.	Team 2	1st leg	2nd leg
Hamburger SV (Germany)	1–2	(England) Fulham	0–0	1–2
Atlético Madrid (Spain)	2–2 (a)	(England) Liverpool	1–0	1–2 (a.e.t.)

=== Final ===
The final took place on 12 May 2010 at the Volksparkstadion in Hamburg, Germany. A draw was held on 19 March 2010, after the quarter-final and semi-final draws, to determine the "home" team for administrative purposes.

12 May 2010
20:45 UTC+2

Atlético Madrid (Spain)	2–1 (a.e.t.)	(England) Fulham
Forlán 32', 116'	Report	Davies 37'

Volksparkstadion, Hamburg
Attendance: 49,000
Referee: Nicola Rizzoli (Italy)

== Statistics ==
Top scorers and assists (excluding qualifying rounds and play-off round):

=== Top goalscorers ===
Rank	Name	Team	Goals	Minutes played
1	(Peru) Claudio Pizarro	(Germany) Werder Bremen	9	692
1	(Paraguay) Óscar Cardozo	(Portugal) Benfica	9	995
3	(Belgium) Jonathan Legear	(Belgium) Anderlecht	6	487
3	(Spain) Fernando Llorente	(Spain) Athletic Bilbao	6	544
3	(Uruguay) Diego Forlán	(Spain) Atlético Madrid	6	599
3	(Spain) David Villa	(Spain) Valencia	6	710
3	(Croatia) Mladen Petrić	(Germany) Hamburger SV	6	870
3	(England) Bobby Zamora	(England) Fulham	6	1027
3	(Hungary) Zoltán Gera	(England) Fulham	6	1276
10	(Ivory Coast) Gervinho	(France) Lille	5	282
10	(Portugal) Rúben Micael	(Portugal) Nacional	5	525
10	(Switzerland) Alexander Frei	(Switzerland) Basel	5	531
10	(Brazil) Luiz Adriano	(Ukraine) Shakhtar Donetsk	5	690
10	(France) Djibril Cissé	(Greece) Panathinaikos	5	720
10	(Spain) Juan Mata	(Spain) Valencia	5	789

=== Top assists ===
Rank	Name	Team	Assists	Minutes played
1	(Germany) Mesut Özil	(Germany) Werder Bremen	6	661
1	(Argentina) Ángel Di María	(Portugal) Benfica	6	972
3	(Norway) Bjørn Helge Riise	(England) Fulham	4	515
3	(Uruguay) Luis Suárez	(Netherlands) Ajax	4	551
3	(Spain) David Silva	(Spain) Valencia	4	559

== See also ==
- 2009–10 UEFA Champions League
- 2010 UEFA Super Cup
