= Janne Moilanen =

Finnish footballer (born 1978)

Personal information
- Date of birth: 24 June 1978 (age 48)
- Place of birth: Mikkeli, Finland
- Height: 1.86 m (6 ft 1 in)
- Position: Defender

Team information
- Current team: FC Lahti
- Number: 4

Senior career*
Years	Team	Apps	(Gls)
1996	MP	2	(0)
1999–2000	Kotkan TP	48	(1)
2001	FC Jokerit	31	(4)
2002	KuPS	20	(1)
2003	AC Allianssi	16	(2)
2005–2006	FC Trollhättan	?	(?)
2007–2010	Lahti	51	(4)
- * Club domestic league appearances and goals as of 15 July 2010

Janne Moilanen (born 24 June 1978) is a Finnish former professional footballer who played as a defender.
