= 2009–10 UEFA Europa League qualifying (first and second round matches) =

European football competition

This page summarises the matches of the first and second qualifying rounds of 2009–10 UEFA Europa League qualifying.

Times are CEST (UTC+2), as listed by UEFA (local times, if different, are in parentheses).

== First qualifying round ==
=== Summary ===
The first legs were played on 2 July, and the second legs were played on 9 July 2009.

Team 1	Agg.	Team 2	1st leg	2nd leg
Sutjeska (Montenegro)	2–3 (Note: Order of legs reversed after original draw)	(Belarus) MTZ-RIPO Minsk	1–1	1–2 (a.e.t.)
Lahti (Finland)	4–3	(Albania) Dinamo Tirana	4–1	0–2
Grevenmacher (Luxembourg)	0–6	(Lithuania) Vėtra	0–3	0–3
NSÍ (Faroe Islands)	1–6	(Norway) Rosenborg	0–3	1–3
Haladás (Hungary)	2–2 (a)	(Kazakhstan) Irtysh	1–0	1–2
Sligo Rovers (Republic of Ireland)	2–3	(Albania) Vllaznia	1–2	1–1
Olimpi Rustavi (Georgia (country))	4–0	(Faroe Islands) B36	2–0	2–0
Anorthosis Famagusta (Cyprus)	7–1	(Luxembourg) Käerjéng 97	5–0	2–1
Slaven Belupo (Croatia)	1–0	(Malta) Birkirkara	1–0	0–0
Zimbru Chișinău (Moldova)	3–2	(Kazakhstan) Okzhetpes	1–2	2–0
Lisburn Distillery (Northern Ireland)	1–11	(Georgia (country)) Zestaponi	1–5	0–6
Helsingborgs IF (Sweden)	4–2	(Armenia) Mika	3–1	1–1
Valletta (Malta)	5–2	(Iceland) Keflavík	3–0	2–2
Dinaburg (Latvia)	2–1	(Estonia) Nõmme Kalju	2–1	0–0
Budućnost Podgorica (Montenegro)	1–2	(Poland) Polonia Warsaw	0–2	1–0
Narva Trans (Estonia)	1–6	(Slovenia) Rudar Velenje	0–3	1–3
Motherwell (Scotland)	3–1	(Wales) Llanelli	0–1	3–0
Banants (Armenia)	1–2	(Bosnia and Herzegovina) Široki Brijeg	0–2	1–0
Spartak Trnava (Slovakia)	5–2	(Azerbaijan) Inter Baku	2–1	3–1
Dinamo Minsk (Belarus)	3–2	(North Macedonia) Renova	2–1	1–1
Randers (Denmark)	7–0	(Northern Ireland) Linfield	4–0	3–0
Simurq (Azerbaijan)	0–4	(Israel) Bnei Yehuda	0–1	0–3
Fram (Iceland)	4–2	(Wales) The New Saints	2–1	2–1

=== Matches ===
2 July 2009
17:30

Sutjeska (Montenegro)	1–1	(Belarus) MTZ-RIPO Minsk
Međedović 49'	Report	Bubnov 77'

Stadion Gradski, Nikšić
Attendance: 1,920
Referee: Arman Amirkhanyan (Armenia)
9 July 2009
17:00

MTZ-RIPO Minsk (Belarus)	2–1 (a.e.t.)	(Montenegro) Sutjeska
Ryndzyuk 67', 111'	Report	Todorović 63'

Traktor Stadium, Minsk
Attendance: 3,050
Referee: Tom Harald Hagen (Norway)

MTZ-RIPO Minsk won 3–2 on aggregate.

2 July 2009
17:30

Lahti (Finland)	4–1	(Albania) Dinamo Tirana
Rafael 2', 86'; Moilanen 43'; Haara 52'	Report	Kuli 28'

Lahden Stadion, Lahti
Attendance: 3,240
Referee: Petur Reinert (Faroe Islands)
9 July 2009
19:00

Dinamo Tirana (Albania)	2–0	(Finland) Lahti
Diop 13', 70'	Report

Qemal Stafa, Tirana (Note: Played in Tirana at Qemal Stafa as Dinamo Tirana's Selman Stërmasi stadium did not meet UEFA criteria.)
Attendance: 3,000
Referee: Vassilios Pamporidis (Greece)

Lahti won 4–3 on aggregate.

2 July 2009
19:00

Grevenmacher (Luxembourg)	0–3	(Lithuania) Vėtra
	Report	Grigaitis 11', 79'; Mašitšev 26'

Stade Josy Barthel, Luxembourg City (Note: Played in Luxembourg City at Stade Josy Barthel as Grevenmacher's Op Flohr Stadion did not meet UEFA criteria.)
Attendance: 560
Referee: Hristo Ristoskov (Bulgaria)
9 July 2009
19:00

Vėtra (Lithuania)	3–0	(Luxembourg) Grevenmacher
Huss 18' (o.g.); Kijanskas 33'; Vėževičius 37'	Report

Vėtra Stadium, Vilnius
Attendance: 800
Referee: Goran Spirkoski (Macedonia)

Vėtra won 6–0 on aggregate.

2 July 2009
20:00

NSÍ (Faroe Islands)	0–3	(Norway) Rosenborg
	Report	Zahora 21', 59'; Lustig 89' (pen.)

Gundadalur, Tórshavn (Note: Played in Tórshavn at Gundadalur as NSÍ's Runavík Stadium did not meet UEFA criteria.)
Attendance: 760
Referee: Alan Muir (Scotland)
9 July 2009
19:00

Rosenborg (Norway)	3–1	(Faroe Islands) NSÍ
Iversen 40'; Konan Ya 90+2' (pen.); Olsen 90+3'	Report	Potemkin 6'

Lerkendal stadion, Trondheim
Attendance: 5,654
Referee: Vadims Direktorenko (Latvia)

Rosenborg won 6–1 on aggregate.

2 July 2009
19:00

Haladás (Hungary)	1–0	(Kazakhstan) Irtysh
Kenesei 79'	Report

Stadion Rohonci Út, Szombathely
Attendance: 3,500
Referee: Albano Janku (Albania)
9 July 2009
16:00

Irtysh (Kazakhstan)	2–1	(Hungary) Haladás
Yurin 20'; Rajos 36' (o.g.)	Report	Chernyshov 24' (o.g.)

Shakhtyor Stadium, Karagandy (Note: Played in Karagandy at Shakhtyor Stadium as Irtysh's Pavlodar Central Stadium did not meet UEFA criteria.)
Attendance: 12,000
Referee: Halis Özkahya (Turkey)

2–2 on aggregate; Haladás won on away goals.

2 July 2009
20:00

Sligo Rovers (Republic of Ireland)	1–2	(Albania) Vllaznia
Cretaro 89' (pen.)	Report	Smajli 69'; Keane 75' (o.g.)

Showgrounds, Sligo
Attendance: 2,700
Referee: Christof Virant (Belgium)
9 July 2009
20:00

Vllaznia (Albania)	1–1	(Republic of Ireland) Sligo Rovers
Shtubina 43'	Report	Keane 84'

Loro-Boriçi Stadium, Shkodër
Attendance: 4,130
Referee: Marco Borg (Malta)

Vllaznia won 3–2 on aggregate.

2 July 2009
15:30

Olimpi Rustavi (Georgia (country))	2–0	(Faroe Islands) B36
Megreladze 10', 88'	Report

Poladi Stadium, Rustavi
Attendance: 3,274
Referee: Artyom Kuchin (Kazakhstan)
9 July 2009
19:00

B36 (Faroe Islands)	0–2	(Georgia (country)) Olimpi Rustavi
	Report	Sirbiladze 6'; Khubua 28'

Gundadalur, Tórshavn
Attendance: 600
Referee: Mario Vlk (Slovakia)

Olimpi Rustavi won 4–0 on aggregate.

2 July 2009
19:00

Anorthosis Famagusta (Cyprus)	5–0	(Luxembourg) Käerjéng 97
Costa 10' (o.g.); Katsavakis 25'; Frousos 62', 90+1'; Cafú 67'	Report

Antonis Papadopoulos Stadium, Larnaca
Attendance: 8,500
Referee: Anthony Buttimer (Republic of Ireland)
9 July 2009
20:00

Käerjéng 97 (Luxembourg)	1–2	(Cyprus) Anorthosis Famagusta
Fiorani 90+3'	Report	Sosin 44'; Frousos 60'

Stade Josy Barthel, Luxembourg City (Note: Played in Luxembourg City at Stade Josy Barthel as Käerjéng 97's Stade um Bëchel did not meet UEFA criteria.)
Attendance: 567
Referee: Vitaly Sevostyanik (Belarus)

Anorthosis Famagusta won 7–1 on aggregate.

2 July 2009
19:00

Slaven Belupo (Croatia)	1–0	(Malta) Birkirkara
Csizmadia 3'	Report

Gradski Stadion, Koprivnica
Attendance: 1,424
Referee: Carlos Xistra (Portugal)
9 July 2009
18:30

Birkirkara (Malta)	0–0	(Croatia) Slaven Belupo
	Report

Centenary Stadium, Ta' Qali (Note: Played in Ta' Qali at Centenary Stadium.)
Attendance: 600
Referee: Georgios Daloukas (Greece)

Slaven Belupo won 1–0 on aggregate.

2 July 2009
18:00

Zimbru Chișinău (Moldova)	1–2	(Kazakhstan) Okzhetpes
Demerji 48'	Report	Karakulov 72'; Çoňkaýew 74'

Zimbru Stadium, Chișinău
Attendance: 3,062
Referee: Gerhard Grobelnik (Austria)
9 July 2009
14:00

Okzhetpes (Kazakhstan)	0–2	(Moldova) Zimbru Chișinău
	Report	O. Andronic 16'; G. Andronic 19'

Torpedo Stadium, Kokshetau
Attendance: 3,500
Referee: Andriy Shandor (Ukraine)

Zimbru Chișinău won 3–2 on aggregate.

2 July 2009
20:45

Lisburn Distillery (Northern Ireland)	1–5	(Georgia (country)) Zestaponi
Whelan 88'	Report	Gelashvili 11', 34'; Grigalashvili 22', 38'; Aptsiauri 52'

Mourneview Park, Lurgan (Note: Played in Lurgan at Mourneview Park as Lisburn Distillery's New Grosvenor Stadium was undergoing renovative work.)
Attendance: 480
Referee: Tamás Bognár (Hungary)
9 July 2009
15:00

Zestaponi (Georgia (country))	6–0	(Northern Ireland) Lisburn Distillery
Dvali 5', 39', 42'; Gelashvili 44'; Benashvili 86', 90'	Report

Municipal Stadium, Zestaponi
Attendance: 3,100
Referee: Augustus Constantin (Romania)

Zestaponi won 11–1 on aggregate.

2 July 2009
20:45

Helsingborgs IF (Sweden)	3–1	(Armenia) Mika
Larsson 50', 86'; Sundin 90+2'	Report	Cano 66'

Olympia, Helsingborg
Attendance: 2,212
Referee: Stefan Messner (Austria)
9 July 2009
15:00

Mika (Armenia)	1–1	(Sweden) Helsingborgs IF
Ednei 83' (pen.)	Report	Makondele 68'

Mika Stadium, Yerevan
Attendance: 6,500
Referee: Boško Jovanetic (Serbia)

Helsingborgs IF won 4–2 on aggregate.

2 July 2009
17:30

Valletta (Malta)	3–0	(Iceland) Keflavík
Falzon 25'; Priso 49'; Den Ouden 72'	Report

Centenary Stadium, Ta' Qali
Attendance: 950
Referee: Pavle Radovanovic (Montenegro)
9 July 2009
21:15

Keflavík (Iceland)	2–2	(Malta) Valletta
Eysteinsson 55'; J. Guðmundsson 72'	Report	Falzon 41'; Priso 82'

Keflavíkurvöllur, Keflavík
Attendance: 914
Referee: Mark Whtby (Wales)

Valletta won 5–2 on aggregate.

2 July 2009
17:00

Dinaburg (Latvia)	2–1	(Estonia) Nõmme Kalju
Afanasjevs 63'; Guchasvili 90+4'	Report	Haavistu 90+2'

Daugava Stadium, Daugavpils
Attendance: 780
Referee: Pawel Gil (Poland)
9 July 2009
18:30

Nõmme Kalju (Estonia)	0–0	(Latvia) Dinaburg
	Report

Lilleküla Stadium, Tallinn (Note: Played in Tallinn at Lilleküla Stadium as Nõmme Kalju's Hiiu Stadium did not meet UEFA criteria.)
Attendance: 902
Referee: Stuart Attwell (England)

Dinaburg won 2–1 on aggregate.

2 July 2009
20:30

Budućnost Podgorica (Montenegro)	0–2	(Poland) Polonia Warsaw
	Report	Kozioł 54'; Jodłowiec 65'

Stadion Pod Goricom, Podgorica
Attendance: 5,329
Referee: Ioannis Stavridis (Greece)
9 July 2009
20:30

Polonia Warsaw (Poland)	0–1	(Montenegro) Budućnost Podgorica
	Report	Vuković 51'

Stadion Polonii, Warsaw
Attendance: 5,500
Referee: Gediminas Mažeika (Lithuania)

Polonia Warsaw won 2–1 on aggregate.

2 July 2009
18:00

Narva Trans (Estonia)	0–3	(Slovenia) Rudar Velenje
	Report	Cipot 9' (pen.); Omladič 61'; Trifković 89'

Lilleküla Stadium, Tallinn (Note: Played in Tallinn at Lilleküla Stadium as Narva Trans's Kreenholmi Staadion did not meet UEFA criteria.)
Attendance: 608
Referee: Mattias Gestranius (Finland)
9 July 2009
19:30

Rudar Velenje (Slovenia)	3–1	(Estonia) Narva Trans
Cipot 28', 73'; Mahmutovič 69'	Report	Starovoitov 74'

Ob Jezeru, Velenje
Attendance: 1,800
Referee: Fariz Yusifov (Azerbaijan)

Rudar Velenje won 6–1 on aggregate.

2 July 2009
21:05

Motherwell (Scotland)	0–1	(Wales) Llanelli
	Report	S. Jones 28'

Excelsior Stadium, Airdrie (Note: Played in Airdrie at Excelsior Stadium as Motherwell's Fir Park was undergoing extensive renovative work.)
Attendance: 4,307
Referee: Tero Nieminen (Finland)
9 July 2009
20:00

Llanelli (Wales)	0–3	(Scotland) Motherwell
	Report	Sutton 8', 25'; Murphy 72'

Parc y Scarlets, Llanelli (Note: Played in Llanelli at Parc y Scarlets as Llanelli's Stebonheath Park did not meet UEFA criteria.)
Attendance: 3,025
Referee: Milorad Mažić (Serbia)

Motherwell won 3–1 on aggregate.

2 July 2009
17:00

Banants (Armenia)	0–2	(Bosnia and Herzegovina) Široki Brijeg
	Report	Ivanković 40'; Rodrigues 65'

Hanrapetakan Stadium, Yerevan (Note: Played in Yerevan at Hanrapetakan Stadium as Banants's Banants Stadium did not meet UEFA criteria.)
Attendance: 2,000
Referee: Jan Jílek (Czech Republic)
9 July 2009
20:30

Široki Brijeg (Bosnia and Herzegovina)	0–1	(Armenia) Banants
	Report	Dashyan 87'

Pecara Stadium, Široki Brijeg
Attendance: 3,000
Referee: Igor Satchi (Moldova)

Široki Brijeg won 2–1 on aggregate.

2 July 2009
19:00

Spartak Trnava (Slovakia)	2–1	(Azerbaijan) Inter Baku
Kožuch 20', 26'	Report	Gutiérrez 80'

Štadión Antona Malatinského, Trnava
Attendance: 3,948
Referee: Victor Shvetsov (Ukraine)
9 July 2009
16:00

Inter Baku (Azerbaijan)	1–3	(Slovakia) Spartak Trnava
Guglielmone 11'	Report	Sukennik 34'; Kožuch 40'; Procházka 48'

Tofik Bakhramov Stadium, Baku (Note: Played in Baku at Tofik Bakhramov Stadium as Inter Baku's Shafa Stadium did not meet UEFA criteria.)
Attendance: 4,753
Referee: Ante Vucemilovic-simunovic, Jr. (Croatia)

Spartak Trnava won 5–2 on aggregate.

2 July 2009
18:00

Dinamo Minsk (Belarus)	2–1	(North Macedonia) Renova
Kislyak 72' (pen.); Strakhanovich 87'	Report	Ibraimi 41'

Dinamo Stadium, Minsk
Attendance: 2,643
Referee: Magnus Thorisson (Iceland)
9 July 2009
17:00

Renova (North Macedonia)	1–1	(Belarus) Dinamo Minsk
Ibraimi 12'	Report	Kislyak 38' (pen.)

Gradski Stadion, Skopje (Note: Played in Skopje at Gradski Stadion as Renova's City Stadium Tetovo did not meet UEFA criteria.)
Attendance: 3,500
Referee: Lasha Silagava (Georgia)

Dinamo Minsk won 3–2 on aggregate.

2 July 2009
19:00

Randers (Denmark)	4–0	(Northern Ireland) Linfield
Berg 36'; Sane 47'; Nygaard 79'; Lorentzen 80'	Report

Essex Park Randers, Randers
Attendance: 5,114
Referee: Stephen Studer (Switzerland)
9 July 2009
20:45

Linfield (Northern Ireland)	0–3	(Denmark) Randers
	Report	Olsen 21'; Lorentzen 51'; Berg 82'

Mourneview Park, Lurgan (Note: Played in Lurgan at Mourneview Park as Linfield's Windsor Park did not meet UEFA criteria.)
Attendance: 800
Referee: Menashe Mashiah (Israel)

Randers won 7–0 on aggregate.

2 July 2009
17:00

Simurq (Azerbaijan)	0–1	(Israel) Bnei Yehuda
	Report	Baldout 83'

Tofik Bakhramov Stadium, Baku (Note: Played in Baku at Tofik Bakhramov Stadium as Simurq's Zaqatala City Stadium did not meet UEFA criteria.)
Attendance: 11,500
Referee: Richard Trutz (Slovakia)
9 July 2009
18:00

Bnei Yehuda (Israel)	3–0	(Azerbaijan) Simurq
Galván 27', 66'; Biton 86'	Report

Bloomfield Stadium, Tel Aviv
Attendance: 2,937
Referee: Radek Příhoda (Czech Republic)

Bnei Yehuda won 4–0 on aggregate.

2 July 2009
20:00

Fram (Iceland)	2–1	(Wales) The New Saints
S. Tillen 33' (pen.); Júlíusson 48'	Report	Evans 24'

Laugardalsvöllur, Reykjavík
Attendance: 592
Referee: Luc Wouters (Belgium)
9 July 2009
20:00

The New Saints (Wales)	1–2	(Iceland) Fram
Evans 11'	Report	Ormarsson 16'; S. Tillen 66' (pen.)

Park Hall, Oswestry
Attendance: 933
Referee: Lars Christoffersen (Denmark)

Fram won 4–2 on aggregate.

== Second qualifying round ==
=== Summary ===
The first legs were played on 14 and 16 July, and the second legs were played on 23 July 2009.

Both the first and second legs between Bnei Yehuda and Dinaburg and between Rapid Wien and Vllaznia were under investigation by UEFA and German authorities for possible match-fixing.

Team 1	Agg.	Team 2	1st leg	2nd leg
Rosenborg (Norway)	0–1	(Azerbaijan) Qarabağ	0–0	0–1
Zimbru Chișinău (Moldova)	0–1 (Note: Order of legs reversed after original draw)	(Portugal) Paços de Ferreira	0–0	0–1
Juvenes/Dogana (San Marino)	0–5	(Poland) Polonia Warsaw	0–1	0–4
Sturm Graz (Austria)	3–2	(Bosnia and Herzegovina) Široki Brijeg	2–1	1–1
Basel (Switzerland)	7–1	(Andorra) FC Santa Coloma	3–0	4–1
Honka (Finland)	3–0	(Wales) Bangor City	2–0	1–0
Žilina (Slovakia)	3–0	(Moldova) Dacia Chișinău	2–0	1–0
Anorthosis Famagusta (Cyprus)	3–4	(Montenegro) Petrovac	2–1	1–3 (a.e.t.)
St Patrick's Athletic (Republic of Ireland)	2–1	(Malta) Valletta	1–1	1–0
Omonia (Cyprus)	8–1	(Faroe Islands) HB	4–0	4–1
HIT Gorica (Slovenia)	1–2	(Finland) Lahti	1–0	0–2
Sigma Olomouc (Czech Republic)	3–1	(Iceland) Fram	1–1	2–0
Legia Warsaw (Poland)	4–0	(Georgia (country)) Olimpi Rustavi	3–0	1–0
Falkirk (Scotland)	1–2	(Liechtenstein) Vaduz	1–0	0–2 (a.e.t.)
IF Elfsborg (Sweden)	3–0	(Hungary) Haladás	3–0	0–0
Rapid Wien (Austria)	8–0	(Albania) Vllaznia	5–0	3–0
Naftan Novopolotsk (Belarus)	2–2 (a)	(Belgium) Gent	2–1	0–1
Liepājas Metalurgs (Latvia)	3–4	(Georgia (country)) Dinamo Tbilisi	2–1	1–3
Differdange 03 (Luxembourg)	1–3	(Croatia) Rijeka	1–0	0–3
Sūduva (Lithuania)	1–2	(Denmark) Randers	0–1	1–1
Vėtra (Lithuania)	3–2	(Finland) HJK	0–1	3–1
Milano (North Macedonia)	2–12	(Croatia) Slaven Belupo	0–4	2–8
Dinamo Minsk (Belarus)	1–4	(Norway) Tromsø	0–0	1–4
KR (Iceland)	3–1	(Greece) AEL	2–0	1–1
Brøndby (Denmark)	4–2	(Estonia) Flora	0–1	4–1
AaB (Denmark)	1–3	(Bosnia and Herzegovina) Slavija	0–0	1–3
Steaua București (Romania)	4–1	(Hungary) Újpest	2–0	2–1
Metalurh Donetsk (Ukraine)	5–1	(Belarus) MTZ-RIPO Minsk	3–0	2–1
Crusaders (Northern Ireland)	3–5	(North Macedonia) Rabotnicki	1–1	2–4
Bnei Yehuda (Israel)	5–0	(Latvia) Dinaburg	4–0	1–0
NAC Breda (Netherlands)	8–0	(Armenia) Gandzasar Kapan	6–0	2–0
Cherno More (Bulgaria)	4–0	(Moldova) Iskra-Stal	1–0	3–0
Sevojno (Serbia)	1–1 (a)	(Lithuania) Kaunas	0–0	1–1
Flamurtari (Albania)	2–8	(Scotland) Motherwell	1–0	1–8
Zestaponi (Georgia (country))	3–4	(Sweden) Helsingborgs IF	1–2	2–2 (a.e.t.)
Skonto (Latvia)	1–2	(Republic of Ireland) Derry City	1–1	0–1
Sliema Wanderers (Malta)	0–3	(Israel) Maccabi Netanya	0–0	0–3
Tobol (Kazakhstan)	1–3	(Turkey) Galatasaray	1–1	0–2
Rudar Velenje (Slovenia)	0–5	(Serbia) Red Star Belgrade	0–1	0–4
Sarajevo (Bosnia and Herzegovina)	2–1	(Slovakia) Spartak Trnava	1–0	1–1

=== Matches ===
16 July 2009
19:00

Rosenborg (Norway)	0–0	(Azerbaijan) Qarabağ
	Report

Lerkendal stadion, Trondheim
Attendance: 6,769
Referee: Dimitar Meckarovski (Macedonia)
23 July 2009
17:00

Qarabağ (Azerbaijan)	1–0	(Norway) Rosenborg
Sadygov 45+1'	Report

Tofik Bakhramov Stadium, Baku (Note: Played in Baku at Tofik Bakhramov Stadium as Qarabağ's Guzanli Olympic Stadium did not meet UEFA criteria.)
Attendance: 27,500
Referee: Mihaly Fabian (Hungary)

Qarabağ won 1–0 on aggregate.

16 July 2009
18:30

Zimbru Chișinău (Moldova)	0–0	(Portugal) Paços de Ferreira
	Report

Zimbru Stadium, Chișinău
Attendance: 7,650
Referee: Philippe Kalt (France)
23 July 2009
21:05

Paços de Ferreira (Portugal)	1–0	(Moldova) Zimbru Chișinău
Cristiano 84'	Report

Estádio D. Afonso Henriques, Guimarães (Note: Played in Guimarães at Estádio D. Afonso Henriques as Paços de Ferreira's Estádio da Mata Real did not meet UEFA criteria.)
Attendance: 1,658
Referee: Fırat Aydınus (Turkey)

Paços de Ferreira won 1–0 on aggregate.

16 July 2009
20:30

Juvenes/Dogana (San Marino)	0–1	(Poland) Polonia Warsaw
	Report	Kokosiński 2'

Montecchio, San Marino (Note: Played in San Marino at Montecchio.)
Attendance: 519
Referee: Tsvetan Georgiev (Bulgaria)
23 July 2009
18:00

Polonia Warsaw (Poland)	4–0	(San Marino) Juvenes/Dogana
Sarvas 10', 66'; Mierzejewski 45'; Chałbiński 54'	Report

Stadion Polonii Warszawa, Warsaw
Attendance: 3,655
Referee: Pavel Saliy (Kazakhstan)

Polonia Warsaw won 5–0 on aggregate.

16 July 2009
19:15

Sturm Graz (Austria)	2–1	(Bosnia and Herzegovina) Široki Brijeg
Haas 11'; Hölzl 39'	Report	Ljubić 67'

UPC-Arena, Graz
Attendance: 10,300
Referee: Mauro Bergonzi (Italy)
23 July 2009
20:15

Široki Brijeg (Bosnia and Herzegovina)	1–1	(Austria) Sturm Graz
Šilić 61'	Report	Jantscher 41'

Pecara Stadium, Široki Brijeg
Attendance: 6,000
Referee: Sándor Andó-Szabó (Hungary)

Sturm Graz won 3–2 on aggregate.

16 July 2009
19:30

Basel (Switzerland)	3–0	(Andorra) FC Santa Coloma
Şahin 23'; Streller 48'; Almerares 59'	Report

St. Jakob-Park, Basel
Attendance: 25,038
Referee: Ceri Richards (Wales)
23 July 2009
19:00

FC Santa Coloma (Andorra)	1–4	(Switzerland) Basel
Dos Santos 42' (pen.)	Report	Streller 12'; Gelabert 15'; Alvarez 40' (o.g.); Almerares 88'

Estadi Comunal d'Aixovall, Andorra la Vella (Note: Played in Andorra la Vella at Estadi Comunal d'Aixovall.)
Attendance: 450
Referee: Rusmir Mrkovic (Bosnia and Herzegovina)

Basel won 7–1 on aggregate.

16 July 2009
18:00

Honka (Finland)	2–0	(Wales) Bangor City
Perovuo 15'; Schüller 74'	Report

Tapiolan Urheilupuisto, Espoo
Attendance: 1,668
Referee: Matej Jug (Slovenia)
23 July 2009
21:05

Bangor City (Wales)	0–1	(Finland) Honka
	Report	Puustinen 39'

Racecourse Ground, Wrexham (Note: Played in Wrexham at Racecourse Ground as Bangor City's Farrar Road Stadium did not meet UEFA criteria and would be demolished soon.)
Attendance: 602
Referee: Peter Sippel (Germany)

Honka won 3–0 on aggregate.

16 July 2009
17:30

Žilina (Slovakia)	2–0	(Moldova) Dacia Chișinău
Oravec 57'; Lietava 77'	Report

Stadium Pod Dubňom, Žilina
Attendance: 3,454
Referee: Stelios Trifonos (Cyprus)
23 July 2009
18:30

Dacia Chișinău (Moldova)	0–1	(Slovakia) Žilina
	Report	Oravec 47'

Dinamo Stadium, Chișinău
Attendance: 2,234
Referee: Adrian McCourt (Northern Ireland)

Žilina won 3–0 on aggregate.

16 July 2009
19:00

Anorthosis Famagusta (Cyprus)	2–1	(Montenegro) Petrovac
Fernandes 12'; Laban 15'	Report	Lakić 85'

Antonis Papadopoulos Stadium, Larnaca
Attendance: 8,500
Referee: Mark Clattenburg (England)
23 July 2009
17:00

Petrovac (Montenegro)	3–1 (a.e.t.)	(Cyprus) Anorthosis Famagusta
Dragićević 15'; Rotković 78', 103'	Report	Katsavakis 45+2'

Stadion Gradski, Nikšić (Note: Played in Nikšić at Stadion Gradski as Petrovac's Pod Malim Brdom Stadium did not meet UEFA criteria.)
Attendance: 2,530
Referee: Alan Black (Northern Ireland)

Petrovac won 4–3 on aggregate.

16 July 2009
20:45

St Patrick's Athletic (Republic of Ireland)	1–1	(Malta) Valletta
O'Brien 38'	Report	G. Agius 65'

Richmond Park, Dublin
Attendance: 1,858
Referee: Andrejs Sipailo (Latvia)
23 July 2009
17:30

Valletta (Malta)	0–1	(Republic of Ireland) St Patrick's Athletic
	Report	O'Brien 80'

Centenary Stadium, Ta' Qali
Attendance: 1,800
Referee: Matej Jug (Slovenia)

Brøndby won 4–2 on aggregate.

16 July 2009
19:30

Omonia (Cyprus)	4–0	(Faroe Islands) HB
Karipidis 4'; Patsatzoglou 11'; Żurawski 34'; Efrem 85'	Report

GSP Stadium, Nicosia
Attendance: 12,835
Referee: Gabriele Rossi (San Marino)
23 July 2009
20:00

HB (Faroe Islands)	1–4	(Cyprus) Omonia
Jespersen 56'	Report	Konstantinou 27', 65', 78'; Wenzel 90'

Gundadalur, Tórshavn
Attendance: 370
Referee: Sten Kaldma (Estonia)

Omonia won 8–1 on aggregate.

16 July 2009
20:00

HIT Gorica (Slovenia)	1–0	(Finland) Lahti
Kršić 39'	Report

Stadion Športni Park, Nova Gorica
Attendance: 750
Referee: Paulius Malžinskas (Lithuania)
23 July 2009
17:30

Lahti (Finland)	2–0	(Slovenia) HIT Gorica
Litmanen 66'; Rafael 79'	Report

Lahden Stadion, Lahti
Attendance: 4,118
Referee: Luca Banti (Italy)

Lahti won 2–1 on aggregate.

16 July 2009
19:00

Sigma Olomouc (Czech Republic)	1–1	(Iceland) Fram
Rossi 89'	Report	Fjóulson 22'

Andrův stadion, Olomouc
Attendance: 5,719
Referee: Daniel Stalhammar (Sweden)
23 July 2009
21:00

Fram (Iceland)	0–2	(Czech Republic) Sigma Olomouc
	Report	Hubník 47'; Otepka 58'

Laugardalsvöllur, Reykjavík
Attendance: 1,226
Referee: Paulo Costa (Portugal)

Sigma Olomouc won 3–1 on aggregate.

16 July 2009
20:00

Legia Warsaw (Poland)	3–0	(Georgia (country)) Olimpi Rustavi
Paluchowski 19'; Kiełbowicz 70'; Szałachowski 82'	Report

Stadion Wojska Polskiego, Warsaw
Attendance: 5,400
Referee: Anastassios Kakos (Greece)
23 July 2009
15:30

Olimpi Rustavi (Georgia (country))	0–1	(Poland) Legia Warsaw
	Report	Szałachowski 8'

Poladi Stadium, Rustavi
Attendance: 2,560
Referee: Bernhard Brugger (Austria)

Legia Warsaw won 4–0 on aggregate.

16 July 2009
20:30

Falkirk (Scotland)	1–0	(Liechtenstein) Vaduz
Flynn 50'	Report

Falkirk Stadium, Falkirk
Attendance: 5,763
Referee: Damien Ledentu (France)
23 July 2009
19:30

Vaduz (Liechtenstein)	2–0 (a.e.t.)	(Scotland) Falkirk
Noll 24'; Burgmeier 105'	Report

Rheinpark Stadion, Vaduz
Attendance: 1,842
Referee: Draženko Kovačić (Croatia)

Vaduz won 2–1 on aggregate.

16 July 2009
19:00

IF Elfsborg (Sweden)	3–0	(Hungary) Haladás
Svensson 61'; Ishizaki 83'; Avdić 90'	Report

Borås Arena, Borås
Attendance: 3,187
Referee: Calum Murray (Scotland)
23 July 2009
19:00

Haladás (Hungary)	0–0	(Sweden) IF Elfsborg
	Report

Stadion Rohonci Út, Szombathely
Attendance: 2,500
Referee: João Ferreira (Portugal)

IF Elfsborg won 3–0 on aggregate.

16 July 2009
19:15

Rapid Wien (Austria)	5–0	(Albania) Vllaznia
Hofmann 33' (pen.); Jelavić 68', 73'; Trimmel 83'; Hoffer 85'	Report

Gerhard Hanappi Stadium, Wien
Attendance: 13,300
Referee: Vladislav Bezborodov (Russia)
23 July 2009
20:00

Vllaznia (Albania)	0–3	(Austria) Rapid Wien
	Report	Hofmann 66', 90+3'; Maierhofer 76'

Loro-Boriçi Stadium, Shkodër
Attendance: 2,400
Referee: Bülent Yıldırım (Turkey)

Rapid Wien won 8–0 on aggregate.

16 July 2009
17:00

Naftan Novopolotsk (Belarus)	2–1	(Belgium) Gent
Dzegtseraw 21', 66'	Report	Marić 90'

Vitebsky CSK, Vitebsk (Note: Played in Vitebsk at Vitebsky Central Sport Complex as Naftan Novopolotsk's Atlant Stadium did not meet UEFA criteria.)
Attendance: 7,747
Referee: Hüseyin Göçek (Turkey)
23 July 2009
20:00

Gent (Belgium)	1–0	(Belarus) Naftan Novopolotsk
Elghanassy 52'	Report

Jules Ottenstadion, Ghent
Attendance: 6,620
Referee: Carlos Clos Gomez (Spain)

2–2 on aggregate; Gent won on away goals.

16 July 2009
18:00

Liepājas Metalurgs (Latvia)	2–1	(Georgia (country)) Dinamo Tbilisi
Karlsons 41'; Kirhners 54'	Report	Khmaladze 68'

Daugava Stadium, Liepāja
Attendance: 3,500
Referee: Anders Hermansen (Denmark)
23 July 2009
16:00

Dinamo Tbilisi (Georgia (country))	3–1	(Latvia) Liepājas Metalurgs
Merebashvili 18', 63'; G. Kashia 53'	Report	Rafaļskis 49'

Boris Paichadze Stadium, Tbilisi
Attendance: 4,000
Referee: Ninoslav Spasic (Serbia)

Dinamo Tbilisi won 4–3 on aggregate.

16 July 2009
20:00

Differdange 03 (Luxembourg)	1–0	(Croatia) Rijeka
Piskor 61'	Report

Stade Josy Barthel, Luxembourg City (Note: Played in Luxembourg City at Stade Josy Barthel as Differdange 03's Stade du Thillenberg did not meet UEFA criteria.)
Attendance: 1,000
Referee: Charlie Richmond (Scotland)
23 July 2009
21:05

Rijeka (Croatia)	3–0	(Luxembourg) Differdange 03
Cerić 20'; Anas Sharbini 24'; Ahmad Sharbini 64'	Report

Kantrida Stadium, Rijeka
Attendance: 3,300
Referee: Vusal Aliyev (Azerbaijan)

Rijeka won 3–1 on aggregate.

16 July 2009
19:00

Sūduva (Lithuania)	0–1	(Denmark) Randers
	Report	Beckmann 23'

Sūduva Stadium, Marijampolė
Attendance: 1,727
Referee: Dragomir Stanković (Serbia)
23 July 2009
19:00

Randers (Denmark)	1–1	(Lithuania) Sūduva
Lorentzen 17'	Report	Lukšys 58'

Essex Park Randers, Randers
Attendance: 3,227
Referee: Hüseyin Göçek (Turkey)

Randers won 2–1 on aggregate.

16 July 2009
19:00

Vėtra (Lithuania)	0–1	(Finland) HJK
	Report	Bah 15'

Vėtra Stadium, Vilnius
Attendance: 1,800
Referee: Vladimir Vnuk (Slovakia)
23 July 2009
18:00

HJK (Finland)	1–3	(Lithuania) Vėtra
Kamara 3'	Report	Grigalevičius 27'; Jankauskas 30'; Moroz 81'

Finnair Stadium, Helsinki
Attendance: 3,258
Referee: Marcin Borski (Poland)

Vėtra won 3–2 on aggregate.

16 July 2009
17:00

Milano (North Macedonia)	0–4	(Croatia) Slaven Belupo
	Report	Csizmadia 26'; Vojnović 39', 41', 44'

Milano Arena, Kumanovo
Attendance: 1,000
Referee: Fernando Teixeira Vitienes (Spain)
23 July 2009
19:00

Slaven Belupo (Croatia)	8–2	(North Macedonia) Milano
Poredski 25'; Vručina 45+3'; Tepurić 61', 74'; Vojnović 78', 88'; Gregurina 80'; Jurić 81'	Report	Stojanović 59'; Alimi 75'

Gradski Stadion, Koprivnica
Attendance: 1,500
Referee: Michael Svendsen (Denmark)

Slaven Belupo won 12–2 on aggregate.

16 July 2009
18:00

Dinamo Minsk (Belarus)	0–0	(Norway) Tromsø
	Report

Dinamo Stadium, Minsk
Attendance: 4,500
Referee: Pavel Olsiak (Slovakia)
23 July 2009
19:00

Tromsø (Norway)	4–1	(Belarus) Dinamo Minsk
Knarvik 28', 90+1'; Jenssen 76'; Moldskred 89'	Report	Mbanangoye 83'

Alfheim stadion, Tromsø
Attendance: 4,019
Referee: Richard Liesveld (Netherlands)

Tromsø won 4–1 on aggregate.

16 July 2009
21:15

KR (Iceland)	2–0	(Greece) AEL
Sigurðsson 55'; Takefusa 90+3'	Report

KR-völlur, Reykjavík
Attendance: 1,302
Referee: Tomasz Mikulski (Poland)
23 July 2009
19:00

AEL (Greece)	1–1	(Iceland) KR
Tsigas 28'	Report	Sigurðarson 75'

Alkazar, Larissa
Attendance: 5,413
Referee: Marijo Strahonja (Croatia)

KR won 3–1 on aggregate.

16 July 2009
20:05

Brøndby (Denmark)	0–1	(Estonia) Flora
	Report	Vanna 50'

Brøndby Stadium, Brøndbyvester
Attendance: 6,926
Referee: Johannes Valgeirsson (Iceland)
23 July 2009
17:45

Flora (Estonia)	1–4	(Denmark) Brøndby
Kasimir 80'	Report	Jallow 28'; Farnerud 35'; Holmén 45+1'; Kristiansen 90+2'

Lilleküla Stadium, Tallinn
Attendance: 2,800
Referee: Johan Verbist (Belgium)

Brøndby won 4–2 on aggregate.

16 July 2009
19:30

AaB (Denmark)	0–0	(Bosnia and Herzegovina) Slavija
	Report

Energi Nord Arena, Aalborg
Attendance: 9,175
Referee: Stanislav Todorov (Bulgaria)
23 July 2009
20:15

Slavija (Bosnia and Herzegovina)	3–1	(Denmark) AaB
Kutalia 35'; Đermanović 48'; Šćepanović 90+3'	Report	Johansson 51'

Asim Ferhatović Hase Stadium, Sarajevo (Note: Played in Sarajevo at Asim Ferhatović Hase Stadium as Slavija's Gradski SRC Slavija Stadium did not meet UEFA criteria.)
Attendance: 4,500
Referee: Andrea de Marco (Italy)

Slavija won 3–1 on aggregate.

16 July 2009
19:30

Steaua București (Romania)	2–0	(Hungary) Újpest
Surdu 46'; Stancu 72'	Report

Stadionul Steaua, București
Attendance: 19,003
Referee: Michael Koukoulakis (Greece)
23 July 2009
19:45

Újpest (Hungary)	1–2	(Romania) Steaua București
Vaskó 82'	Report	Székely 58'; Grzelak 66'

Szusza Ferenc Stadium, Budapest
Attendance: 9,678
Referee: Andre Marriner (England)

Steaua București won 4–1 on aggregate.

16 July 2009
18:30

Metalurh Donetsk (Ukraine)	3–0	(Belarus) MTZ-RIPO Minsk
Mguni 34'; Mkhitaryan 42'; Hodin 66'	Report

Metalurh Stadium, Donetsk
Attendance: 4,000
Referee: Babak Rafati (Germany)
23 July 2009
17:00 (Note: The MTZ-RIPO v Metalurh Donetsk match was suspended in the 11th minute due to inclement weather and poor drainage on the waterlogged pitch. After 55 minutes the match resumed.)

MTZ-RIPO Minsk (Belarus)	1–2	(Ukraine) Metalurh Donetsk
Ceolin 16'	Report	Mguni 36'; Mkhitaryan 85'

Traktor Stadium, Minsk
Attendance: 1,200
Referee: Olivier Thual (France)

Metalurh Donetsk won 5–1 on aggregate.

14 July 2009
20:45

Crusaders (Northern Ireland)	1–1	(North Macedonia) Rabotnicki
Rainey 90'	Report	B. Božinovski 47'

Mourneview Park, Lurgan (Note: Played in Lurgan at Mourneview Park as Crusaders's Seaview did not meet UEFA criteria.)
Attendance: 950
Referee: Asaf Kenan (Israel)
23 July 2009
17:00

Rabotnicki (North Macedonia)	4–2	(Northern Ireland) Crusaders
B. Božinovski 20'; Zé Carlos 35', 79'; Petkovski 84'	Report	Owens 69'; Donnelly 90+3'

Gradski Stadium, Skopje
Attendance: 2,000
Referee: Radek Příhoda (Czech Republic)

Rabotnicki won 5–3 on aggregate.

16 July 2009
19:00

Bnei Yehuda (Israel)	4–0	(Latvia) Dinaburg
Galván 25'; Mori 38'; Atar 67'; Zhairi 90+3'	Report

Bloomfield Stadium, Tel Aviv
Attendance: 2,600
Referee: Novo Panić (Bosnia and Herzegovina)
23 July 2009
18:00

Dinaburg (Latvia)	0–1	(Israel) Bnei Yehuda
	Report	Atar 32'

Daugava Stadium, Daugavpils
Attendance: 850
Referee: Brage Sandmoen (Norway)

Bnei Yehuda won 5–0 on aggregate.

16 July 2009
20:45

NAC Breda (Netherlands)	6–0	(Armenia) Gandzasar Kapan
Kwakman 24'; De Graaf 55', 70'; Amoah 57', 61'; Lurling 68'	Report

Rat Verlegh Stadion, Breda
Attendance: 13,600
Referee: Petteri Kari (Finland)
23 July 2009
17:30

Gandzasar Kapan (Armenia)	0–2	(Netherlands) NAC Breda
	Report	Lurling 14'; De Graaf 34'

Hanrapetakan Stadium, Yerevan (Note: Played in Yerevan at Hanrapetakan Stadium as Gandzasar Kapan's Lernagorts Stadium did not meet UEFA criteria.)
Attendance: 1,000
Referee: Simon Lee Evans (Wales)

NAC Breda won 8–0 on aggregate.

16 July 2009
19:00

Cherno More (Bulgaria)	1–0	(Moldova) Iskra-Stal
Manolov 44'	Report

Stadion Lazur, Burgas (Note: Played in Burgas at Lazur Stadium as Cherno More's Ticha Stadium did not meet UEFA criteria.)
Attendance: 3,010
Referee: Steve Tanner (England)
23 July 2009
19:00

Iskra-Stal (Moldova)	0–3	(Bulgaria) Cherno More
	Report	Manolov 25', 54'; Georgiev 60'

Sheriff Stadium, Tiraspol (Note: Played in Tiraspol at Sheriff Stadium as Iskra-Stal's Orăşănesc Stadium did not meet UEFA criteria.)
Attendance: 3,175
Referee: Anders Hermansen (Denmark)

Cherno More won 4–0 on aggregate.

16 July 2009
18:00

Sevojno (Serbia)	0–0	(Lithuania) Kaunas
	Report

Partizan Stadium, Belgrade (Note: Played in Belgrade at Partizan Stadium as Sevojno's Stadion kraj Valjaonice did not meet UEFA criteria.)
Attendance: 700
Referee: Anthony Buttimer (Republic of Ireland)
23 July 2009
18:00

Kaunas (Lithuania)	1–1	(Serbia) Sevojno
Fridrikas 76'	Report	Vujović 48'

S. Darius and S. Girėnas Stadium, Kaunas
Attendance: 1,900
Referee: Meir Levi (Israel)

1–1 on aggregate; Sevojno won on away goals.

16 July 2009
17:30

Flamurtari (Albania)	1–0	(Scotland) Motherwell
Strati 66'	Report

Stadiumi Flamurtari, Vlorë
Attendance: 4,012
Referee: Fritz Stuchlik (Austria)
23 July 2009
20:45

Motherwell (Scotland)	8–1	(Albania) Flamurtari
Murphy 16', 19', 34'; Slane 25'; Forbes 28' (pen.), 50'; Hutchinson 38'; McHugh 72'	Report	Roshi 65'

Excelsior Stadium, Airdrie
Attendance: 4,641
Referee: Michael Lerjéus (Sweden)

Motherwell won 8–2 on aggregate.

16 July 2009
16:00

Zestaponi (Georgia (country))	1–2	(Sweden) Helsingborgs IF
Benashvili 70'	Report	Jönsson 62'; Larsson 89'

Municipal Stadium, Zestaponi
Attendance: 3,958
Referee: Carlo Bertolini (Switzerland)
23 July 2009
20:45

Helsingborgs IF (Sweden)	2–2 (a.e.t.)	(Georgia (country)) Zestaponi
Ekstrand 90+4'; Sundin 101'	Report	Dvali 29'; Gelashvili 32'

Olympia, Helsingborg
Attendance: 2,580
Referee: Hannes Kaasik (Estonia)

Helsingborgs IF won 4–3 on aggregate.

16 July 2009
18:45

Skonto (Latvia)	1–1	(Republic of Ireland) Derry City
Kozlovs 17'	Report	McManus 44'

Skonto Stadions, Riga
Attendance: 1,950
Referee: Albert Toussaint (Luxembourg)
23 July 2009
20:00

Derry City (Republic of Ireland)	1–0	(Latvia) Skonto
Deery 57'	Report

Brandywell Stadium, Derry
Attendance: 2,700
Referee: Pol van Boekel (Netherlands)

Derry City won 2–1 on aggregate.

14 July 2009
17:45

Sliema Wanderers (Malta)	0–0	(Israel) Maccabi Netanya
	Report

Centenary Stadium, Ta' Qali
Attendance: 200
Referee: Veaceslav Banari (Moldova)
23 July 2009
19:00

Maccabi Netanya (Israel)	3–0	(Malta) Sliema Wanderers
Samya 58'; Ezra 83'; Saba'a 89'	Report

Bloomfield Stadium, Tel Aviv (Note: Played in Tel Aviv at Bloomfield Stadium as Maccabi Netanya's Sar-Tov Stadium would be demolished soon.)
Attendance: 1,993
Referee: Karen Nalbandyan (Armenia)

Maccabi Netanya won 3–0 on aggregate.

16 July 2009
18:30

Tobol (Kazakhstan)	1–1	(Turkey) Galatasaray
Zhumaskaliyev 2'	Report	Baroš 58'

Kostanay Central Stadium, Kostanay
Attendance: 8,320
Referee: Libor Kovařík (Czech Republic)
23 July 2009
20:00

Galatasaray (Turkey)	2–0	(Kazakhstan) Tobol
Sarp 63'; Çetin 90'	Report

Ali Sami Yen Stadium, Istanbul
Attendance: 16,955
Referee: Antonio Rubinos Perez (Spain)

Galatasaray won 3–1 on aggregate.

16 July 2009
20:00

Rudar Velenje (Slovenia)	0–1	(Serbia) Red Star Belgrade
	Report	Perović 59'

Ob Jezeru, Velenje
Attendance: 2,500
Referee: Jérôme Laperrière (Switzerland)
23 July 2009
20:30

Red Star Belgrade (Serbia)	4–0	(Slovenia) Rudar Velenje
Bogdanović 37'; Jevtić 74', 90+4'; Cadu 85'	Report

Stadion Crvena Zvezda, Belgrade
Attendance: 23,000
Referee: Maxim Layushkin (Russia)

Red Star Belgrade won 5–0 on aggregate.

16 July 2009
20:15

Sarajevo (Bosnia and Herzegovina)	1–0	(Slovakia) Spartak Trnava
Muminović 14'	Report

Asim Ferhatović Hase Stadium, Sarajevo
Attendance: 14,000
Referee: David Malcolm (Northern Ireland)
23 July 2009
19:30

Spartak Trnava (Slovakia)	1–1	(Bosnia and Herzegovina) Sarajevo
Doležaj 19'	Report	Jahović 88'

Štadión Antona Malatinského, Trnava
Attendance: 8,215
Referee: Leontios Trattou (Cyprus)

Sarajevo won 2–1 on aggregate.
