= 2009–10 Villarreal CF season =

Villarreal
2009–10 season
- President: Fernando Roig
- Head coach: Ernesto Valverde (until 31 January); Juan Carlos Garrido
- Stadium: El Madrigal
- La Liga: 7th
- Copa del Rey: Round of 16
- UEFA Europa League: Round of 32
- Top goalscorer: League: Nilmar (11); All: Giuseppe Rossi (17)
Home colours	Away colours

The 2009–10 season was Villarreal Club de Fútbol's 87th season in existence and the club's 10th consecutive season in the top flight of Spanish football. In addition to the domestic league, Villarreal participated in this season's editions of the Copa del Rey and the UEFA Europa League. The season covered the period from 1 July 2009 to 30 June 2010.

== Players ==
=== First-team squad ===
Note: Flags indicate national team as defined under FIFA eligibility rules; some limited exceptions apply. Players may hold more than one non-FIFA nationality.

No.	Pos.	Nation	Player
1	GK	ESP	Xavi Oliva
2	DF	ARG	Gonzalo Rodríguez
4	DF	URU	Diego Godín
5	DF	ESP	Joan Capdevila
7	MF	FRA	Robert Pirès
8	MF	ESP	Santi Cazorla
9	FW	ESP	Joseba Llorente
10	MF	ESP	Cani (vice-captain)
11	MF	ARG	Ariel Ibagaza
12	FW	BRA	Nilmar
13	GK	ESP	Diego López

No.	Pos.	Nation	Player
14	MF	ESP	David Fuster
17	DF	ESP	Javi Venta (vice-captain)
18	DF	ESP	Ángel López
19	MF	ESP	Marcos Senna (captain)
20	DF	ESP	Iván Marcano
21	MF	ESP	Bruno Soriano
22	FW	ITA	Giuseppe Rossi
24	MF	ARG	Damián Escudero
28	FW	ARG	Marco Ruben
31	MF	ESP	Javier Matilla
41	DF	ARG	Mateo Musacchio

=== Out on loan ===
Note: Flags indicate national team as defined under FIFA eligibility rules; some limited exceptions apply. Players may hold more than one non-FIFA nationality.

No.	Pos.	Nation	Player
—	FW	USA	Jozy Altidore (on-loan to Hull City)
—	MF	URU	Sebastián Eguren (on-loan to AIK)
—	MF	BRA	Tiago Dutra (on-loan to Maccabi Haifa)
—	MF	BRA	Bruno Renan (on-loan to Grêmio)

== Competitions ==
=== Overall record ===
Competition	First match	Last match	Starting round	Final position	Record							
Competition	First match	Last match	Starting round	Final position	Pld	W	D	L	GF	GA	GD	Win %
La Liga	30 August 2009	15 May 2010	Matchday 1	7th	38	16	8	14	58	57	+1	42.11
Copa del Rey	29 October 2009	12 January 2010	Round of 32	Round of 16	4	1	2	1	3	3	+0	25.00
UEFA Europa League	20 August 2009	25 February 2010	Play-off round	Round of 32	16	12	1	3	20	14	+6	75.00
Total					58	29	11	18	81	74	+7	50.00

Source: Competitions

=== La Liga ===
==== League table ====
Pos	Team	Pld	W	D	L	GF	GA	GD	Pts	Qualification or relegation
5	Mallorca	38	18	8	12	59	44	+15	62 (Note: Mallorca could not qualify for the 2010–11 UEFA Europa League due to being immersed in a creditor contest, a situation against UEFA criteria. Then, Villarreal was invited to replace this spot.)	
6	Getafe	38	17	7	14	58	48	+10	58	Qualification for the Europa League play-off round
7	Villarreal	38	16	8	14	58	57	+1	56	Qualification for the Europa League play-off round
8	Athletic Bilbao	38	15	9	14	50	53	−3	54	
9	Atlético Madrid	38	13	8	17	57	61	−4	47 (Note: DEP 2–1 ATM; ATM 3–0 DEP)	Qualification for the Europa League group stage (Note: Since Atlético Madrid won the 2009–10 UEFA Europa League they earned a spot in the group stage of the 2010–11 UEFA Europa League.)

Source: LFP and Yahoo! Sport
Rules for classification: 1) points; 2) head-to-head points; 3) head-to-head goal difference; 4) head-to-head goals scored; 5) goal difference; 6) number of goals scored.

==== Results summary ====
Overall								Home						Away					
Pld	W	D	L	GF	GA	GD	Pts	W	D	L	GF	GA	GD	W	D	L	GF	GA	GD
38	16	8	14	58	57	+1	56	13	3	3	35	18	+17	3	5	11	23	39	−16

Source: La Liga

==== Results by round ====
Round	1	2	3	4	5	6	7	8	9	10	11	12	13	14	15	16	17	18	19	20	21	22	23	24	25	26	27	28	29	30	31	32	33	34	35	36	37	38
Ground	A	H	A	H	A	H	A	H	H	A	H	A	H	A	H	A	H	A	H	H	A	H	A	H	A	H	A	A	H	A	H	A	H	A	H	A	H	A
Result	D	D	L	L	L	D	L	W	W	L	W	L	W	W	W	D	D	L	W	L	L	W	L	W	D	W	L	D	W	W	W	L	W	W	L	L	W	D
Position	10	13	17	18	19	19	20	18	13	16	11	12	11	10	9	9	10	10	9	9	10	10	10	8	8	9	9	10	8	7	7	8	6	6	6	7	7	7

Source: La Liga
A = Away; H = Home; W = Win; D = Draw; L = Loss

==== Matches ====
30 August 2009 1	Osasuna	1–1	Villarreal	Pamplona
				Stadium: El Sadar

13 September 2009 2	Villarreal	1–1	Mallorca	Villarreal
				Stadium: El Madrigal

20 September 2009 3	Athletic Bilbao	3–2	Villarreal	Bilbao
				Stadium: San Mamés

23 September 2009 4	Villarreal	0–2	Real Madrid	Villarreal
				Stadium: El Madrigal

27 September 2009 5	Deportivo La Coruña	1–0	Villarreal	A Coruña
				Stadium: Riazor

4 October 2009 6	Villarreal	0–0	Espanyol	Villarreal
				Stadium: El Madrigal

18 October 2009 7	Xerez	2–1	Villarreal	Jerez
				Stadium: Chapín

25 October 2009 8	Villarreal	2–1	Málaga	Villarreal
				Stadium: El Madrigal

1 November 2009 9	Villarreal	5–0	Tenerife	Villarreal
				Stadium: El Madrigal

8 November 2009 10	Sevilla	3–2	Villarreal	Seville
				Stadium: Ramón Sánchez Pizjuán

22 November 2009 11	Villarreal	3–1	Valladolid	Villarreal
				Stadium: El Madrigal

28 November 2009 12	Sporting Gijón	1–0	Villarreal	Gijón
				Stadium: El Molinón

6 December 2009 13	Villarreal	3–2	Getafe	Villarreal
				Stadium: El Madrigal

13 December 2009 14	Atlético Madrid	1–2	Villarreal	Madrid
				Stadium: Vicente Calderón

20 December 2009 15	Villarreal	2–0	Racing Santander	Villarreal
				Stadium: El Madrigal

2 January 2010 16	Barcelona	1–1	Villarreal	Barcelona
				Stadium: Camp Nou

9 January 2010 17	Villarreal	1–1	Almería	Villarreal
				Stadium: El Madrigal

17 January 2010 18	Valencia	4–1	Villarreal	Valencia
				Stadium: Mestalla

24 January 2010 19	Villarreal	4–2	Zaragoza	Villarreal
				Stadium: El Madrigal

31 January 2010 20	Villarreal	0–2	Osasuna	Villarreal
				Stadium: El Madrigal

7 February 2010 21	Mallorca	1–0	Villarreal	Palma
				Stadium: Iberostar

13 February 2010 22	Villarreal	2–1	Athletic Bilbao	Villarreal
				Stadium: El Madrigal

21 February 2010 23	Real Madrid	6–2	Villarreal	Madrid
				Stadium: Santiago Bernabéu

28 February 2010 24	Villarreal	1–0	Deportivo La Coruña	Villarreal
				Stadium: El Madrigal

7 March 2010 25	Espanyol	0–0	Villarreal	Barcelona
				Stadium: Cornellà-El Prat

14 March 2010 26	Villarreal	2–0	Xerez	Villarreal
				Stadium: El Madrigal

21 March 2010 27	Málaga	2–0	Villarreal	Málaga
				Stadium: La Rosaleda

24 March 2010 28	Tenerife	2–2	Villarreal	Tenerife
				Stadium: Heliodoro Rodríguez López

28 March 2010 29	Villarreal	3–0	Sevilla	Villarreal
				Stadium: El Madrigal

4 April 2010 30	Valladolid	0–2	Villarreal	Valladolid
				Stadium: José Zorrilla

10 April 2010 31	Villarreal	1–0	Sporting Gijón	Villarreal
				Stadium: El Madrigal

13 April 2010 32	Getafe	3–0	Villarreal	Getafe
				Stadium: Coliseum Alfonso Pérez

17 April 2010 33	Villarreal	2–1	Atlético Madrid	Villarreal
				Stadium: El Madrigal

25 April 2010 34	Racing Santander	1–2	Villarreal	Santander
				Stadium: El Sardinero

1 May 2010 35	Villarreal	1–4	Barcelona	Villarreal
				Stadium: El Madrigal

4 May 2010 36	Almería	4–2	Villarreal	Almería
				Stadium: Juegos Mediterráneos

8 May 2010 37	Villarreal	2–0	Valencia	Villarreal
				Stadium: El Madrigal

15 May 2010 38	Zaragoza	3–3	Villarreal	Zaragoza
				Stadium: La Romareda

=== Copa del Rey ===
==== Round of 32 ====
29 October 2009 First leg	Puertollano	1–1	Villarreal	Puertollano
				Stadium: Francisco Sánchez Menor

10 November 2009 Second leg	Villarreal	1–0 (2–1 agg.)	Puertollano	Villarreal
				Stadium: El Madrigal

==== Round of 16 ====
6 January 2010 First leg	Celta Vigo	1–1	Villarreal	Vigo
18:00 CET (UTC+1)	Arthuro 44'	Report	Rossi 12'	Stadium: Balaídos; Attendance: 9,500; Referee: Javier Turienzo Álvarez

12 January 2010 Second leg	Villarreal	0–1 (1–2 agg.)	Celta Vigo	Villarreal
21:00 CET (UTC+1)		Report	Trashorras 90' (pen.)	Stadium: El Madrigal; Attendance: 7,000; Referee: David Fernández Borbalán

=== UEFA Europa League ===
==== Play-off round ====
20 August 2009 First leg	NAC Breda (Netherlands)	1–3	(Spain) Villarreal	Breda, Netherlands
19:00 CEST (UTC+2)	Loran 17'	Report	Rossi 14'; Ibagaza 49'; Llorente 90+2'	Stadium: Rat Verlegh Stadion; Attendance: 15,200; Referee: Stefan Johannesson (Sweden)

27 August 2009 Second leg	Villarreal (Spain)	6–1 (9–2 agg.)	(Netherlands) NAC Breda	Villarreal, Spain
20:30 CEST (UTC+2)	Cazorla 16'; Rossi 23' (pen.), 37' (pen.); Senna 46'; Jonathan 57'; Kiko 61'	Report	De Graaf 80'	Stadium: El Madrigal; Attendance: 13,000; Referee: Craig Thomson (Scotland)

==== Group stage ====
Pos	Team	Pld	W	D	L	GF	GA	GD	Pts	Qualification	SBG	VIL	LAZ	LS
1	(Austria) Red Bull Salzburg	6	6	0	0	9	2	+7	18	Advance to knockout phase	—	2–0	2–1	1–0
2	(Spain) Villarreal	6	3	0	3	8	6	+2	9	Advance to knockout phase	0–1	—	4–1	1–0
3	(Italy) Lazio	6	2	0	4	9	10	−1	6		1–2	2–1	—	0–1
4	(Bulgaria) Levski Sofia	6	1	0	5	1	9	−8	3		0–1	0–2	0–4	—

Source: Soccerway

17 September 2009 1	Villarreal (Spain)	1–0	(Bulgaria) Levski Sofia	Villarreal, Spain
21:05 CEST (UTC+2)	Nilmar 72'	Report		Stadium: El Madrigal; Attendance: 5,244; Referee: Mike Dean (England)

1 October 2009 2	Red Bull Salzburg (Austria)	2–0	(Spain) Villarreal	Salzburg, Austria
19:00 CEST (UTC+2)	Janko 21'; Tchoyi 84'	Report		Stadium: Red Bull Arena; Attendance: 18,800; Referee: Costas Kapitanis (Cyprus)

22 October 2009 3	Lazio (Italy)	2–1	(Spain) Villarreal	Rome, Italy
19:00 CEST (UTC+2)	Zárate 20'; Rocchi 90+2'	Report	Eguren 40'	Stadium: Stadio Olimpico; Attendance: 14,388; Referee: Ivan Bebek (Croatia)

5 November 2009 4	Villarreal (Spain)	4–1	(Italy) Lazio	Villarreal, Spain
21:05 CET (UTC+1)	Pires 2', 15' (pen.); Cani 13'; Rossi 83' (pen.)	Report	Zárate 73'	Stadium: El Madrigal; Attendance: 14,114; Referee: Knut Kircher (Germany)

2 December 2009 5	Levski Sofia (Bulgaria)	0–2	(Spain) Villarreal	Sofia, Bulgaria
19:00 CET (UTC+1)		Report	Rossi 36'; Senna 84'	Stadium: Georgi Asparuhov Stadium; Attendance: 5,000; Referee: Paul Allaerts (Belgium)

17 December 2009 6	Villarreal (Spain)	0–1	(Austria) Red Bull Salzburg	Villarreal, Spain
21:05 CET (UTC+1)		Report	Švento 7'	Stadium: El Madrigal; Attendance: 5,860; Referee: Vladimír Hriňák (Slovakia)

==== Knockout phase ====
===== Round of 32 =====
18 February 2010 First leg	Villarreal (Spain)	2–2	(Germany) Wolfsburg	Villarreal, Spain
19:00 CET (UTC+1)	Senna 43'; Ruben 85'	Report	Grafite 65', 84' (pen.)	Stadium: El Madrigal; Attendance: 11,384; Referee: Kevin Blom (Netherlands)

25 February 2010 Second leg	Wolfsburg (Germany)	4–1 (6–3 agg.)	(Spain) Villarreal	Wolfsburg, Germany
21:05 CET (UTC+1)	Džeko 10'; Ángel 15' (o.g.); Gentner 42'; Grafite 64'	Report	Capdevila 30'	Stadium: Volkswagen Arena; Attendance: 16,613; Referee: Alexandru Tudor (Romania)
