= Fulham F.C. in European football =

English club in European football

- Club: Fulham
- Seasons played: 3
- Most appearances: Mark Schwarzer (30)
- Top scorer: Bobby Zamora (10)
- First entry: 2002 UEFA Intertoto Cup
- Latest entry: 2011–12 UEFA Europa League

Titles
- Intertoto Cup: 2002

Fulham F.C. are a member of the European Club Association, having qualified three times for European competition, qualifying for the UEFA Intertoto Cup after their inaugural season in the Premier League, and the UEFA Europa League twice.

They played in the inaugural edition of the competition after their club-best seventh-place finish in the 2008–09 Premier League season, and qualified again for the 2011–12 Europa League via England's Fair Play berth. Fulham are unbeaten at home in European competition, in 23 games, with a record of 17 wins and six draws, second to Ipswich Town’s European record.

On 18 February 2010, Fulham's home unbeaten run in European competition stretched to 13 games when they beat UEFA Cup holders Shakhtar Donetsk of Ukraine 2–1 at Craven Cottage in the Europa League Round of 32 first leg, with goals from Zoltán Gera and Bobby Zamora. In Fulham's 46 games in all European competitions, (excluding the 2010 UEFA Europa League Final lost in extra-time) they have only lost seven of them (all away): 2–1 to Hertha BSC, 1–0 to Amkar Perm, 2–1 to Roma, 3–1 to Juventus, 1–0 to Dnipro Dnipropetrovsk, 1–0 to Twente and 1–0 to Wisła Kraków.

After defeating Juventus on 18 March, Fulham advanced to the quarter-finals against reigning German champions VfL Wolfsburg. On 1 April, Fulham defeated the Germans 2–1 in the first leg of the two-legged home-and-away series. Bobby Zamora and Damien Duff scored within five minutes of each other in the second half, while Wolfsburg defender Alexander Madlung scored two minutes from time to cut the deficit in half. One week later at Wolfsburg, Zamora struck again, this time in the first minute to give Fulham an overall 3–1 lead in the series. Wolfsburg were unable to overturn the two goal deficit, and Fulham advanced to the semi-finals of the competition. On 22 April, following a long coach trip due to flights being grounded because of the Icelandic volcano, Fulham played out a 0–0 draw against Hamburger SV in the first leg of their semi-final in Hamburg. On 29 April, they then beat Hamburg 2–1 at Craven Cottage to secure a place in the final.

On 12 May, Fulham lost 2–1 after extra time to Atlético Madrid in the final. Fulham went 1–0 down, though it ended 1–1 after 90 minutes thanks to a Davies equaliser to force extra time. Diego Forlán, however, scored the winner on the 116th minute to clinch the game for the Spanish team.

Fulham qualified for the 2011–12 UEFA Europa League by virtue of the Fair Play league. They started their campaign in the first qualifying round, beating NSÍ Runavík, followed by a win over Crusaders in the Second qualifying round. A 3–1 aggregate win over Dnipro Dnipropetrovsk saw them into the group stages, where they were drawn against Twente, Odense and Wisła Kraków in group K. They were knocked out of the tournament when Odense equalised for a 2–2 draw in the last second of the final group game, leaving Fulham stranded in third, with Kraków going through along with Twente in first.

== Overall record ==
Accurate as of 13 August 2017

| Competition | Played | Won | Drew | Lost | GF | GA | GD | Win% |
|---|---|---|---|---|---|---|---|---|
| UEFA Cup / UEFA Europa League | 39 | 21 | 10 | 8 | 62 | 31 | +31 | 53.85 |
| UEFA Intertoto Cup | 8 | 4 | 4 | 0 | 11 | 5 | +6 | 50.00 |
| Total | 47 | 25 | 14 | 8 | 73 | 36 | +37 | 53.19 |

Source: uefa.com
Pld = Matches played; W = Matches won; D = Matches drawn; L = Matches lost; GF = Goals for; GA = Goals against. Defunct competitions indicated in italics.

== Results ==
Fulham in Europe
| Season | Competition | Round | Country | Club | Home | Away | Aggregate | Ref. |
|---|---|---|---|---|---|---|---|---|
| 2002 | Intertoto Cup | Second round | (Finland) | Haka | 0–0 | 1–1 | 1–1 (a) | |
| 2002 | Intertoto Cup | Third round | (Greece) | Egaleo | 1–0 | 1–1 | 2–1 | |
| 2002 | Intertoto Cup | Semi-final | (France) | Sochaux | 1–0 | 2–0 | 3–0 | |
| 2002 | Intertoto Cup | Final | (Italy) | Bologna | 3–1 | 2–2 | 5–3 | |
| 2002–03 | UEFA Cup | First round | (Croatia) | Hajduk Split | 2–2 | 1–0 | 3–2 | |
| 2002–03 | UEFA Cup | Second round | (Croatia) | Dinamo Zagreb | 2–1 | 3–0 | 5–1 | |
| 2002–03 | UEFA Cup | Third round | (Germany) | Hertha BSC | 0–0 | 1–2 | 1–2 | |
| 2009–10 | UEFA Europa League | Third Qualifying Round | (Lithuania) | Vėtra | 3–0 | 3–0 | 6–0 | |
| 2009–10 | UEFA Europa League | Play-off Round | (Russia) | Amkar Perm | 3–1 | 0–1 | 3–2 | |
| 2009–10 | UEFA Europa League | Group E | (Switzerland) | Basel | 1–0 | 3–2 | 2nd | |
| 2009–10 | UEFA Europa League | Group E | (Bulgaria) | CSKA Sofia | 1–0 | 1–1 | 2nd | |
| 2009–10 | UEFA Europa League | Group E | (Italy) | Roma | 1–1 | 1–2 | 2nd | |
| 2009–10 | UEFA Europa League | Round of 32 | (Ukraine) | Shakhtar Donetsk | 2–1 | 1–1 | 3–2 | |
| 2009–10 | UEFA Europa League | Round of 16 | (Italy) | Juventus | 4–1 | 1–3 | 5–4 | |
| 2009–10 | UEFA Europa League | Quarter-final | (Germany) | VfL Wolfsburg | 2–1 | 1–0 | 3–1 | |
| 2009–10 | UEFA Europa League | Semi-final | (Germany) | Hamburger SV | 2–1 | 0–0 | 2–1 | |
| 2009–10 | UEFA Europa League | Final | (Spain) | Atlético Madrid | 1–2 (aet) | | | |
| 2011–12 | UEFA Europa League | First Qualifying Round | (Faroe Islands) | NSÍ Runavík | 3–0 | 0–0 | 3–0 | |
| 2011–12 | UEFA Europa League | Second Qualifying Round | (Northern Ireland) | Crusaders | 4–0 | 3–1 | 7–1 | |
| 2011–12 | UEFA Europa League | Third Qualifying Round | (Croatia) | RNK Split | 2–0 | 0–0 | 2–0 | |
| 2011–12 | UEFA Europa League | Play-off Round | (Ukraine) | Dnipro Dnipropetrovsk | 3–0 | 0–1 | 3–1 | |
| 2011–12 | UEFA Europa League | Group K | (Netherlands) | Twente | 1–1 | 0–1 | 3rd | |
| 2011–12 | UEFA Europa League | Group K | (Denmark) | Odense | 2–2 | 2–0 | 3rd | |
| 2011–12 | UEFA Europa League | Group K | (Poland) | Wisła Kraków | 4–1 | 0–1 | 3rd | |
