= 2010 UEFA Europa League final =

- Match programme cover
- Event: 2009–10 UEFA Europa League
Atlético Madrid	Fulham
(Spain)	(England)
2	1
- After extra time
- Date: 12 May 2010
- Venue: Volksparkstadion, Hamburg
- Man of the Match: Diego Forlán (Atlético Madrid)
- Referee: Nicola Rizzoli (Italy)
- Attendance: 49,000
- Weather: Cloudy night 8 °C (46 °F); 60% humidity

The 2010 UEFA Europa League final was the final match of the 2009–10 UEFA Europa League, the first season of the revamped European football competition formerly known as the UEFA Cup. Played at the Volksparkstadion in Hamburg, Germany, on 12 May 2010, the match was won by Spain's Atlético Madrid, who, after extra time, beat England's Fulham 2–1.

The win gave Atlético their second major European title, following the 1961–62 European Cup Winners' Cup. Having beaten defending champions Shakhtar Donetsk on the way, Fulham were playing in their first final in only their second season of European football, and their second major final overall in the club's history.

As the winners, Atlético qualified automatically for the 2010–11 UEFA Europa League. They also played in the 2010 UEFA Super Cup in Monaco on 27 August 2010, where they took on Italy's Inter Milan, the winners of the 2009–10 UEFA Champions League; Atlético won 2–0.

== Background ==
Atlético Madrid and Fulham had never played against each other before this match, and Atlético were Fulham's first ever Spanish opponents. Atlético, on the other hand, had played 19 previous matches against English opposition, winning six and losing five; the most recent of these was against Liverpool in the semi-finals.

Fulham were playing in only their second season of European football; in 2002–03, they won the Intertoto Cup and reached the third round of the UEFA Cup before being knocked out by Hertha BSC. Atlético, however, had played in four previous European finals, including the 1974 European Cup Final, which they lost to Bayern Munich, and three Cup Winners' Cup finals. Their only European title came in 1962, when they beat Fiorentina 3–0 in a replay at Neckarstadion, Stuttgart, after the original match at Hampden Park, Glasgow, finished as a 1–1 draw.

The final was Fulham's last chance at qualification for European football in the following season. The Premier League season had finished the previous weekend with Fulham finishing in 12th place, 17 points away from the Europa League places. Earlier in the season, they had been knocked out of the League Cup in the third round and in the sixth round of the FA Cup. Atlético were also unable to qualify for Europe via the league; they went into the match in ninth place in the Priméra División, eight points away from the league's Europa League places with one game left to play. However, they had a chance at qualification through the Copa del Rey; they played against Sevilla in the final on 19 May, but lost 2–0.

== Venue ==
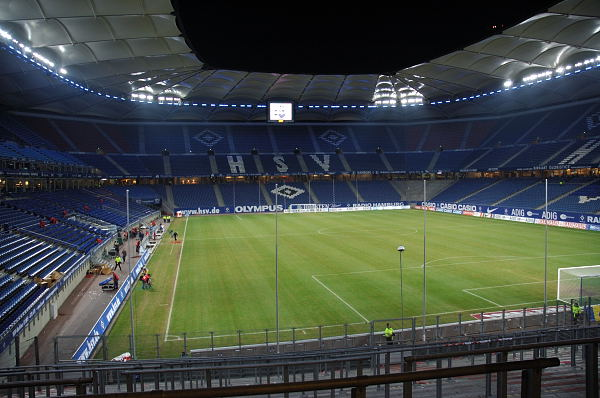
The Volksparkstadion, renamed to "Hamburg Arena" for the match, was selected as the venue for the 2010 final in March 2008.

The Volksparkstadion was chosen as the venue for the 2010 UEFA Europa League Final at a meeting of the UEFA Executive Committee in Vaduz, Liechtenstein, on 28 March 2008. The committee – who selected the venue for the 2010 UEFA Champions League Final at the same meeting – based their decision on a number of key criteria, including stadium capacity, facilities and security.

Before 2010, only two European cup finals had ever been played in the city of Hamburg, both of them at the Volksparkstadion (English: the People's Park Stadium), when the finals of certain competitions were played over two legs on a home-and-away basis. The first was the 1982 UEFA Cup Final second leg where hosts Hamburger SV lost 3–0 to hand the UEFA Cup to IFK Göteborg of Sweden following a 1–0 defeat in the first leg at Ullevi in Gothenburg. The second one was the 1983 European Super Cup first leg where the 1983 European Cup winners Hamburg drew 0–0 with the 1983 European Cup Winners' Cup winners Aberdeen.

A total of six European Cup/UEFA Champions League finals and three UEFA Cup Winners' Cup finals have been played in German cities, as well as one UEFA Cup final since it became a single-legged match.

The Volksparkstadion was opened in 2000 on the site of Hamburg's previous stadia: the Bahrenfelder Stadium and the original Volksparkstadion. The Bahrenfelder Stadium was built in 1925, but after a two-year renovation, it was replaced by the 75,000-capacity Volksparkstadion in 1953. Hamburger SV moved into the Volksparkstadion from their previous home at Rothenbaum in 1963. The stadium then played host to three Group 1 matches at the 1974 FIFA World Cup in West Germany. 14 years later, UEFA Euro 1988 was held in West Germany and the Volksparkstadion was chosen to host the semi-final between West Germany and the Netherlands. By the late 1990s, plans were laid down for a complete renovation of the stadium; the playing surface was rotated by 90 degrees to take advantage of the natural angle of sunlight and the stadium was rebuilt to hold more than 57,000 spectators. Building work began in 1998 and Hamburger SV returned to the ground in 2000. The stadium was used as a venue for the 2006 FIFA World Cup, playing host to four group stage matches and the quarter-final between Italy and Ukraine.

The 'hosts' for the final, Hamburger SV were only eliminated from the tournament by Fulham at the semi-final stage. The disappointment of coming so close to playing a final at home was doubled for the Hamburg fans as this was the second consecutive year in which they had been knocked out at the same stage in the UEFA Cup/Europa League – in 2008–09, they lost out to local rivals Werder Bremen. Two recent finals had involved a team playing at their usual stadium: Feyenoord defeated Borussia Dortmund in Rotterdam in 2002, while Sporting CP lost to CSKA Moscow in Lisbon in 2005.

== Route to the final ==
Note: In all results below, the score of the finalist is given first (H: home; A: away).

(Spain) Atlético Madrid				Round	(England) Fulham			
Champions League					Europa League			
Opponent	Agg.	1st leg	2nd leg	Qualifying phase (CL, EL)	Opponent	Agg.	1st leg	2nd leg
Bye				Third qualifying round	(Lithuania) Vėtra	6–0	3–0 (A)	3–0 (H)
(Greece) Panathinaikos	5–2	2–0 (A)	3–2 (H)	Play-off round	(Russia) Amkar Perm	3–2	3–1 (H)	0–1 (A)
Opponent	Result			Group stage (CL, EL)	Opponent	Result		
(Cyprus) APOEL	0–0 (H)			Matchday 1	(Bulgaria) CSKA Sofia	1–1 (A)		
(Portugal) Porto	0–2 (A)			Matchday 2	(Switzerland) Basel	1–0 (H)		
(England) Chelsea	0–4 (A)			Matchday 3	(Italy) Roma	1–1 (H)		
(England) Chelsea	2–2 (H)			Matchday 4	(Italy) Roma	1–2 (A)		
(Cyprus) APOEL	1–1 (A)			Matchday 5	(Bulgaria) CSKA Sofia	1–0 (H)		
(Portugal) Porto	0–3 (H)			Matchday 6	(Switzerland) Basel	3–2 (A)		
Group D third place: Pos / Team / Pld / Pts; 1 / (England) Chelsea / 6 / 14; 2 / (Portugal) Porto / 6 / 12; 3 / (Spain) Atlético Madrid / 6 / 3; 4 / (Cyprus) APOEL / 6 / 3; Source: RSSSF				Final standings	Group E runners-up: Pos / Team / Pld / Pts; 1 / (Italy) Roma / 6 / 13; 2 / (England) Fulham / 6 / 11; 3 / (Switzerland) Basel / 6 / 9; 4 / (Bulgaria) CSKA Sofia / 6 / 1; Source: Soccerway			
Europa League					Group E runners-up: Pos / Team / Pld / Pts; 1 / (Italy) Roma / 6 / 13; 2 / (England) Fulham / 6 / 11; 3 / (Switzerland) Basel / 6 / 9; 4 / (Bulgaria) CSKA Sofia / 6 / 1; Source: Soccerway			
Opponent	Agg.	1st leg	2nd leg	Knockout phase	Opponent	Agg.	1st leg	2nd leg
(Turkey) Galatasaray	3–2	1–1 (H)	2–1 (A)	Round of 32	(Ukraine) Shakhtar Donetsk	3–2	2–1 (H)	1–1 (A)
(Portugal) Sporting CP	2–2 (a)	0–0 (H)	2–2 (A)	Round of 16	(Italy) Juventus	5–4	1–3 (A)	4–1 (H)
(Spain) Valencia	2–2 (a)	2–2 (A)	0–0 (H)	Quarter-finals	(Germany) VfL Wolfsburg	3–1	2–1 (H)	1–0 (A)
(England) Liverpool	2–2 (a)	1–0 (H)	1–2 (a.e.t.) (A)	Semi-finals	(Germany) Hamburger SV	2–1	0–0 (A)	2–1 (H)

== Pre-match ==
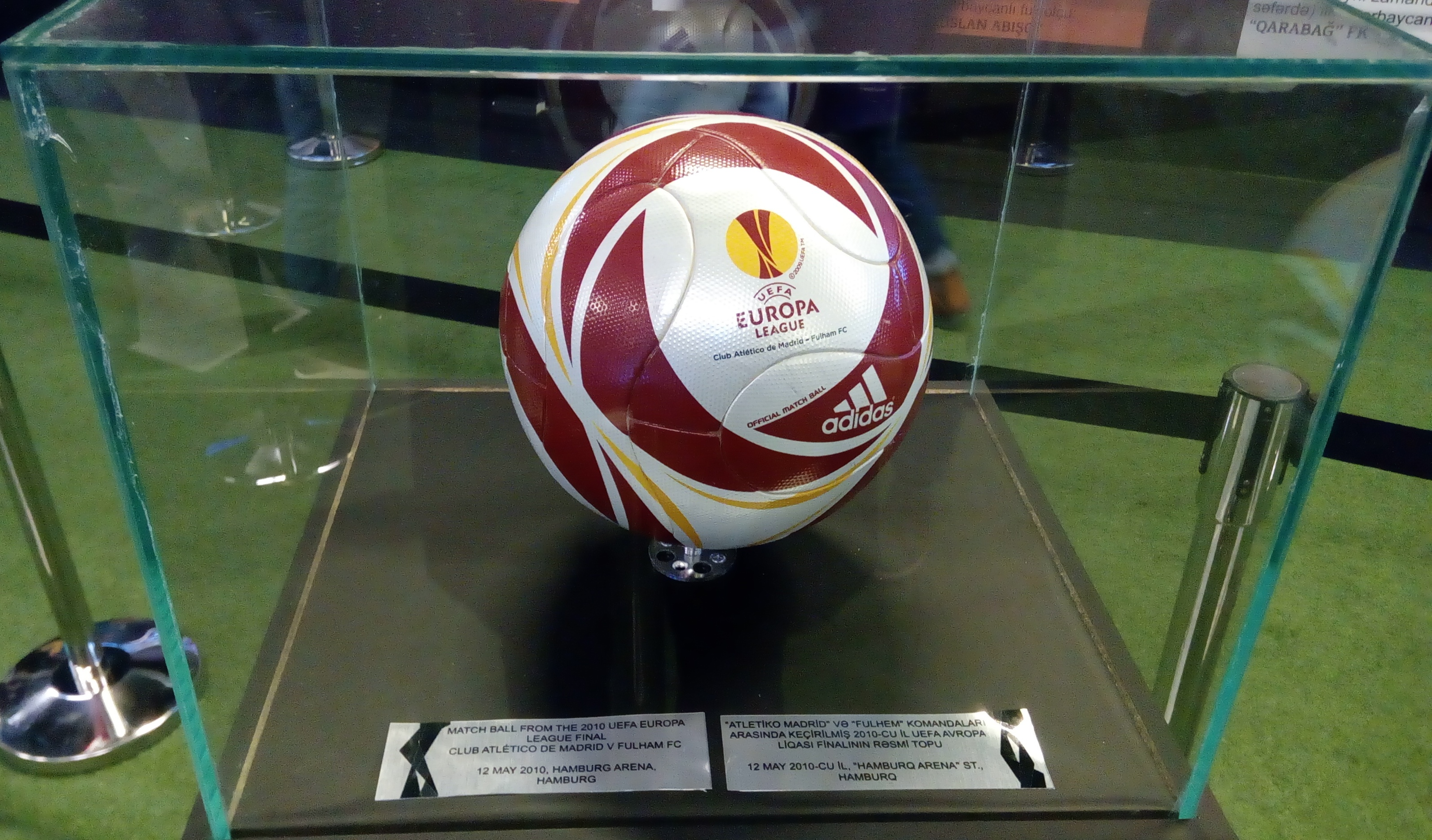
Match ball

=== Identity ===
Like the recent finals of the UEFA Champions League and UEFA Cup, the 2010 Europa League final was given its own unique visual identity. The design concept is intended to give the public a distinctive impression of the host city and will be used on all media associated with the event. The logo for the 2010 final was revealed at the EAST Hotel Cinema in Hamburg on 30 November 2009 – to coincide with the opening of ticket sales for German residents on 1 December – and the ceremony was attended by Karin Von Welck, the regional officer for sport and culture, German Football Association general secretary Wolfgang Niersbach, Hamburger SV chairman Bernd Hoffmann and Germany Under-19 coach Horst Hrubesch. The logo features an artistic impression of two footballers competing for a ball, set against a modern drawing of various elements of the Hamburg skyline.

=== Related events ===
A trophy handover ceremony was held at the Fischauktionshalle in Hamburg on 13 April 2010, at which a delegation from holders Shakhtar Donetsk – including chief executive Serhiy Palkin, coach Mircea Lucescu, defender Mariusz Lewandowski and midfielder Jádson – returned the trophy to UEFA President Michel Platini. Platini then presented the trophy to the mayor of Hamburg, Ole von Beust, for it to be put on display in the city until the day of the final. Also present at the ceremony were the presidents of Hamburger SV and the German Football Association: Bernd Hoffmann and Theo Zwanziger.

=== Ambassador ===
Former Hamburg player Uwe Seeler was appointed as ambassador of the final.

=== Ticketing ===
The regular capacity of the Volksparkstadion was just over 57,000; however, for the 2010 Europa League final and other international matches, the standing area in the north stand was converted to seating, reducing the capacity to around 51,500. Approximately 25% of the available tickets were allocated to each club for distribution to their own fans, while approximately 5,100 tickets were retained for the international general public. Following the ticket application process for German residents – which ran from 1 December 2009 to 15 January 2010 – applications were opened to the international general public on 24 February 2010 and closed on 19 March. As demand exceeded the number of tickets available, successful applications were determined by a ballot at the end of March.

=== Officials ===
The referee for the 2010 UEFA Europa League Final was Nicola Rizzoli, representing the Italian Football Federation. Rizzoli had been an international referee since 2007, and took charge of his first UEFA Champions League match in the August of that year, even before his first UEFA Cup match. Since then, he refereed a further 10 Champions League matches and nine UEFA Cup/Europa League matches. His only Europa League assignment in 2009–10 – other than the final – was the second leg of Liverpool's round of 16 tie against Lille at Anfield on 18 March 2010. Rizzoli had previously refereed quarter-finals in both the Champions League and the UEFA Cup.

The refereeing team was entirely made up of officials from the same country; Rizzoli was joined by assistant referees Cristiano Copelli and Luca Maggiani, and the fourth official was Gianluca Rocchi. As part of an ongoing experiment throughout the entire 2009–10 UEFA Europa League, there were also two additional assistant referees with the task of monitoring each penalty area; the extra officials for the 2010 final were Paolo Tagliavento and Andrea De Marco.

=== Team selection ===
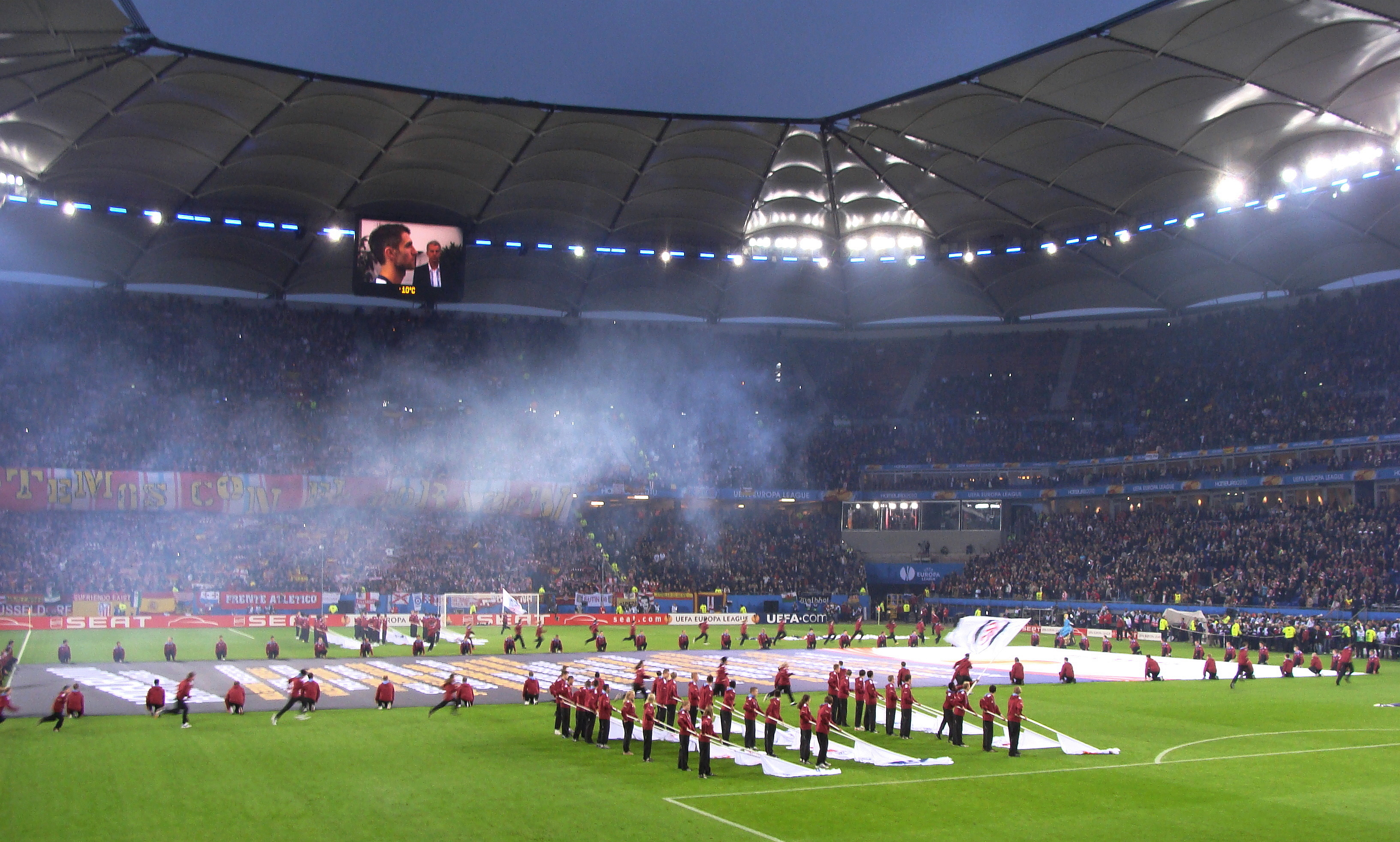
The opening ceremony took place immediately before the teams emerged.

For Atlético, only Sergio Asenjo was unavailable through injury; the Spanish back-up goalkeeper started Atlético's match away to Sporting de Gijón on 8 May after manager Quique Sánchez Flores rested his regular number 1, David de Gea, ahead of the Europa League final, but he tore ligaments in his right knee after 13 minutes and was ruled out for six months. As well as De Gea, Flores rested a further six regular first-team players for their penultimate league match: Luis Perea, Paulo Assunção, Simão, Raúl García, Diego Forlán, and Sergio Agüero.

In the Fulham camp, the most severe injury concerns related to top-scorer Bobby Zamora and winger Damien Duff; Zamora strained his Achilles tendon in the second leg of Fulham's semi-final against Hamburger SV on 29 April and missed the last three league games of the season, while Duff picked up a calf injury in the penultimate league game against Stoke City on 5 May. Other players with minor injuries included Paul Konchesky (ankle), Brede Hangeland (knee), Aaron Hughes (groin), John Paintsil (muscle strain), and Bjørn Helge Riise (stomach cramps).

Neither team had any players missing through suspension, so the final team selections were largely as expected; the biggest surprise was from Fulham manager Roy Hodgson, who named Chris Baird at right-back ahead of Ghanaian international John Paintsil.

== Match ==
=== Summary ===
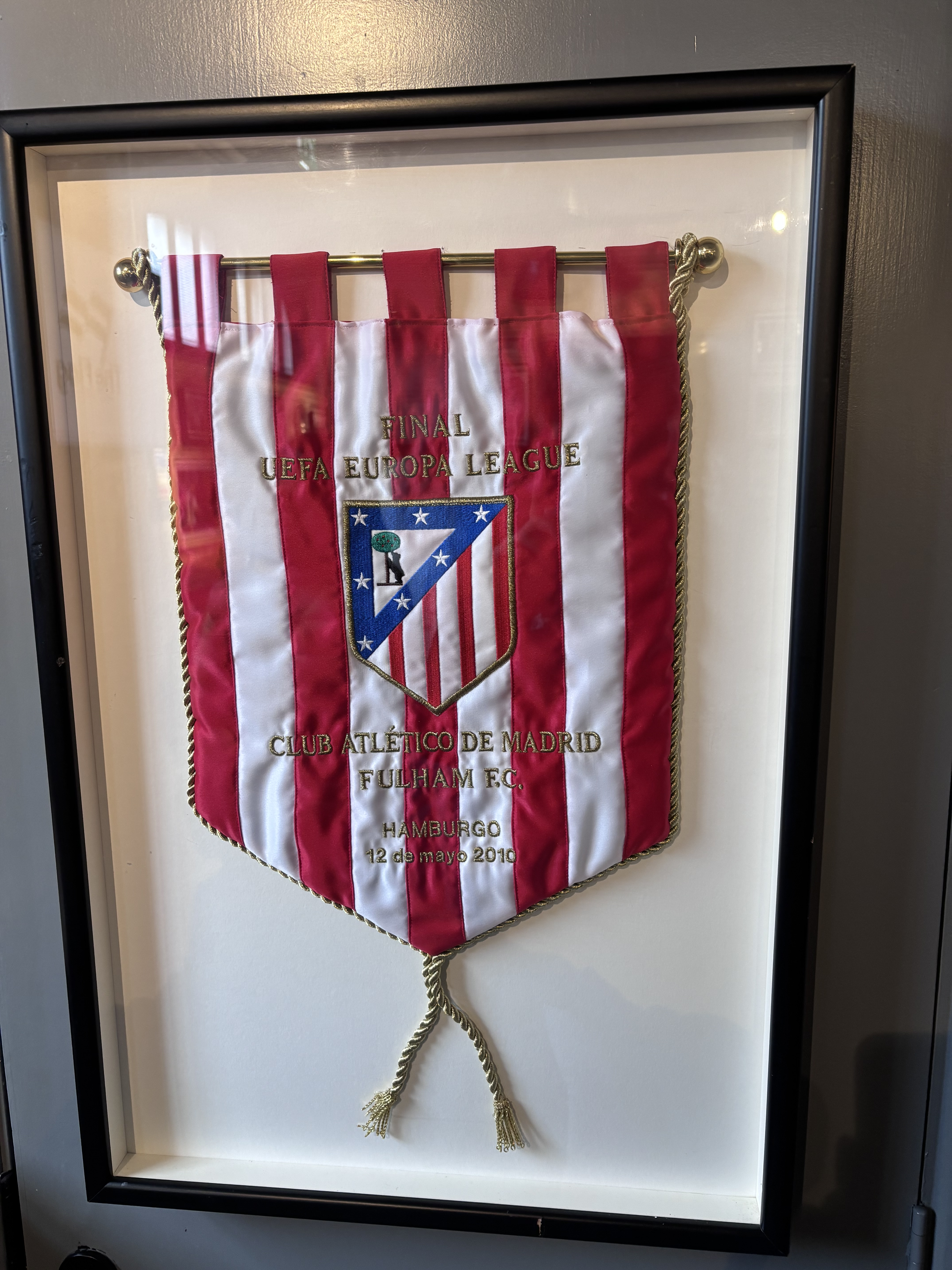
Atlético's pre-match pennant

Atlético started the stronger side and had a chance to take the lead in the 12th minute when Sergio Agüero latched onto a backpass from Danny Murphy and played the ball into Diego Forlán, whose shot struck the post. The sustained pressure from the Spanish club was eventually rewarded when a mistimed shot from Agüero fell to Forlán, who struck the ball past Mark Schwarzer to give Atlético a 1–0 lead. The lead, however, only lasted for five minutes, before Simon Davies struck Zoltán Gera's cross into the net on the half-volley to level the scores at 1–1.

In the second half, Fulham began to gain a foothold in the game and went close to taking the lead after an hour when Simon Davies struck a shot following a poor clearance, which required a save from Atlético goalkeeper David de Gea. In the 55th minute, Bobby Zamora, who had been a fitness doubt prior to the game, was replaced by Clint Dempsey, who became the first American to appear in a major European football final. Atlético finished the 90 minutes as the stronger side, but with neither team able to score, the game went into extra time. In extra time, it was again Atlético who looked the more likely to score, with both Forlán and Agüero having opportunities to hit the net. As the tie approached 120 minutes, however, the Spanish side scored a winner, when Agüero turned Fulham defender Aaron Hughes and crossed the ball to Forlán, who flicked the ball into the goal. Forlán was subsequently named man of the match for his performance.

=== Details ===
12 May 2010
20:45 UTC+2

Atlético Madrid (Spain)	2–1 (a.e.t.)	(England) Fulham
Forlán 32', 116'	Report	Davies 37'

Volksparkstadion, Hamburg
Attendance: 49,000
Referee: Nicola Rizzoli (Italy)

Atlético Madrid	Fulham

GK	43	(Spain) David de Gea
RB	17	(Czech Republic) Tomáš Ujfaluši
CB	21	(Colombia) Luis Perea
CB	18	(Spain) Álvaro Domínguez
LB	3	(Spain) Antonio López (c)
RM	19	(Spain) José Antonio Reyes		(substituted off) 78'
CM	12	(Brazil) Paulo Assunção
CM	8	(Spain) Raúl García	(yellow card) 114'
LM	20	(Portugal) Simão		(substituted off) 68'
CF	7	(Uruguay) Diego Forlán	(yellow card) 117'
CF	10	(Argentina) Sergio Agüero		(substituted off) 119'
Substitutes:
GK	42	(Spain) Joel Robles
DF	2	(Spain) Juan Valera		(substituted on) 119'
DF	16	(Spain) Juanito
DF	24	(Uruguay) Leandro Cabrera
MF	6	(Spain) Ignacio Camacho
MF	9	(Spain) José Manuel Jurado		(substituted on) 68'
FW	14	(Argentina) Eduardo Salvio	(yellow card) 107'	(substituted on) 78'
Manager:
(Spain) Quique Sánchez Flores

GK	1	(Australia) Mark Schwarzer
RB	6	(Northern Ireland) Chris Baird
CB	18	(Northern Ireland) Aaron Hughes
CB	5	(Norway) Brede Hangeland	(yellow card) 63'
LB	3	(England) Paul Konchesky
RM	16	(Republic of Ireland) Damien Duff		(substituted off) 84'
CM	20	(Nigeria) Dickson Etuhu
CM	13	(England) Danny Murphy (c)		(substituted off) 118'
LM	29	(Wales) Simon Davies
AM	11	(Hungary) Zoltán Gera
CF	25	(England) Bobby Zamora		(substituted off) 55'
Substitutes:
GK	19	(Switzerland) Pascal Zuberbühler
DF	4	(Ghana) John Paintsil
MF	17	(Norway) Bjørn Helge Riise
MF	23	(United States) Clint Dempsey		(substituted on) 55'
MF	27	(England) Jonathan Greening		(substituted on) 118'
MF	34	(South Africa) Kagisho Dikgacoi
FW	10	(Norway) Erik Nevland		(substituted on) 84'
Manager:
(England) Roy Hodgson

Man of the Match:
Diego Forlán (Atlético Madrid)

Assistant referees:
Cristiano Copelli (Italy)
Luca Maggiani (Italy)
Fourth official:
Gianluca Rocchi (Italy)
Additional assistant referees:
Paolo Tagliavento (Italy)
Andrea De Marco (Italy)
Reserve assistant referee:
Nicola Nicoletti (Italy)

=== Statistics ===
First half
Statistic	Atlético Madrid	Fulham
Goals scored	1	1
Total shots	12	4
Shots on target	7	2
Saves	1	5
Ball possession	52%	48%
Corner kicks	7	0
Fouls committed	5	7
Offsides	0	3
Yellow cards	0	0
Red cards	0	0

Second half
Statistic	Atlético Madrid	Fulham
Goals scored	0	0
Total shots	8	4
Shots on target	1	1
Saves	1	1
Ball possession	55%	45%
Corner kicks	1	1
Fouls committed	3	7
Offsides	0	5
Yellow cards	0	1
Red cards	0	0

Extra time
Statistic	Atlético Madrid	Fulham
Goals scored	1	0
Total shots	7	3
Shots on target	2	0
Saves	0	1
Ball possession	56%	44%
Corner kicks	1	1
Fouls committed	7	3
Offsides	0	1
Yellow cards	3	0
Red cards	0	0

Overall
Statistic	Atlético Madrid	Fulham
Goals scored	2	1
Total shots	27	11
Shots on target	10	3
Saves	2	7
Ball possession	54%	46%
Corner kicks	9	2
Fouls committed	15	17
Offsides	0	9
Yellow cards	3	1
Red cards	0	0

== See also ==
- 2010 UEFA Champions League final
- 2010 UEFA Super Cup
- Atlético Madrid in European football
- Fulham F.C. in European football
- 2009–10 Atlético Madrid season
- 2009–10 Fulham F.C. season
