= Vladimír Hriňák =

Slovak football referee (1964–2012)

- Born: 25 February 1964; Bratislava, Czechoslovakia
- Died: 25 July 2012 (aged 48)
- Other occupation: Teacher, sales manager

Domestic
Years	League	Role
1992–1993	Czechoslovak First League	Referee
1993–2009	Slovak Super Liga	Referee

International
Years	League	Role
1993–2009	FIFA	Referee
1993–2009	UEFA	Referee

Vladimír Hriňák (25 February 1964 – 25 July 2012) was a Slovak football referee. He took up refereeing in 1982, and was promoted to the Czechoslovak First League for the 1992–93 season, in which he refereed 7 matches and made 22 more appearances. Besided that he added 220 matches as the referee in a separate Slovak League Competition.

In 1993, he became a FIFA-listed match official, and in a 16-year international career, he refereed over 100 UEFA matches. 88 of them were matches in European Cups of all categories. He also has twenty international friendly, qualifying and friendly matches to his credit, as well as appearing in the final tournament of the European Under-16 Championship in 1994.

In 2008, Hriňák was selected as the fourth official for the Champions League final between Manchester United and Chelsea, as part of an all-Slovak team headed by Ľuboš Micheľ. Hriňák's final international fixture was a match between Villarreal and Red Bull Salzburg in the group stage of the 2009–10 Europa League on 17 December 2009. He said goodbye to his home scene on 29 November 2009, in the match between Nitra and Dubnica.

After retiring from refereeing, Hriňák took up several positions within the Slovak Football Association and was also the chairman of the Bratislava Football Association referees committee.
