= 2009–10 UEFA Europa League group stage =

International football competition

The 2009–10 UEFA Europa League group stage matches took place between 17 September and 17 December 2009.

The group stage featured the 38 winners of the play-off round and the 10 losing sides of the Champions League play-off round.

Following the completion of the group stage, the top two teams in each group advanced to play in the round of 32, where they were joined by the eight third-placed teams from the Champions League group stage.

== Teams ==
The draw for the group stage was held in Monaco on 28 August 2009.

Seeding was determined by the UEFA coefficients: Pot 1 held teams ranked 9–32, Pot 2 held teams ranked 35–74, Pot 3 held teams ranked 76–108, while Pot 4 held teams ranked 115–203 and unranked teams.

Clubs from the same association were paired up to split the matchdays between Thursday.

Group winners and runners-up advanced to the round of 32

Pot 1
Team	Notes	Coeff.
(Ukraine) Shakhtar Donetsk		74.370
(Germany) Werder Bremen		91.339
(Spain) Villarreal		80.853
(Italy) Roma		78.582
(Netherlands) PSV Eindhoven		75.826
(Portugal) Sporting CP		68.292
(Germany) Hamburger SV		67.339
(Portugal) Benfica		64.292
(Spain) Valencia		59.853
(Greece) Panathinaikos		56.633
(Netherlands) Ajax		54.826
(Romania) Steaua București		53.781

Pot 2
Team	Notes	Coeff.
(Turkey) Fenerbahçe		52.445
(Switzerland) Basel		51.050
(France) Lille		47.033
(Scotland) Celtic		40.575
(England) Everton		35.899
(Belgium) Club Brugge		34.065
(Netherlands) Heerenveen		33.826
(Turkey) Galatasaray		33.445
(Belgium) Anderlecht		32.065
Austria Wien		31.565
(Denmark) Copenhagen		26.890
(Italy) Lazio		26.582

Pot 3
Team	Notes	Coeff.
(Germany) Hertha BSC		26.339
(Czech Republic) Sparta Prague		26.150
(Romania) Dinamo București		25.781
(Greece) AEK Athens		25.633
(Czech Republic) Slavia Prague		25.150
(Bulgaria) Levski Sofia		24.250
(Spain) Athletic Bilbao		23.853
(Serbia) Partizan		23.050
(Israel) Hapoel Tel Aviv		18.050
(Netherlands) Twente		17.826
(Croatia) Dinamo Zagreb		16.466
(England) Fulham		15.899

Pot 4
Team	Notes	Coeff.
(Bulgaria) CSKA Sofia		14.250
(France) Toulouse		14.033
(Romania) CFR Cluj		13.781
(Italy) Genoa		12.582
(Austria) Rapid Wien		8.565
(Romania) Timișoara		7.781
(Belarus) BATE Borisov		7.733
(Portugal) Nacional		7.292
(Austria) Red Bull Salzburg		6.565
(Austria) Sturm Graz		3.565
(Latvia) Ventspils		2.832
(Moldova) Sheriff Tiraspol		1.333

Notes

1. ^{TH} Europa League title holders (automatic top seed of pot 1)
2. ^{CL-CP} Losing teams from the Champions League play-off round (Champions Path)
3. ^{CL-NCP} Losing teams from the Champions League play-off round (Non-Champions Path)

== Tie-breaking criteria ==
Based on Article 7.05 in the UEFA regulations, if two or more teams were equal on points on completion of the group matches, the following criteria were applied to determine the rankings:

1. higher number of points obtained in the group matches played among the teams in question;
2. superior goal difference from the group matches played among the teams in question;
3. higher number of goals scored away from home in the group matches played among the teams in question;
4. superior goal difference from all group matches played;
5. higher number of goals scored;
6. higher number of coefficient points accumulated by the club in question, as well as its association, over the previous five seasons.

== Groups ==
All times CET/CEST.

=== Group A ===
Pos	Team	Pld	W	D	L	GF	GA	GD	Pts	Qualification	AND	AJX	DZ	TIM
1	(Belgium) Anderlecht	6	3	2	1	9	4	+5	11	Advance to knockout phase	—	1–1	0–1	3–1
2	(Netherlands) Ajax	6	3	2	1	8	6	+2	11	Advance to knockout phase	1–3	—	2–1	0–0
3	(Croatia) Dinamo Zagreb (Note: On 29 October 2009, UEFA's Control and Disciplinary Body ruled that Dinamo Zagreb would have to play their next two home matches in the UEFA Europa League behind closed doors due to the actions of their supporters in their match at Timișoara. They also deducted three points from the Croatian club's points tally in Group A. The club appealed, but the appeal was not heard until after the first closed-doors game against Ajax. After the appeal was heard, UEFA replaced the three-point deduction with a €75,000 fine, and a three-year suspended ban from European competition, while the two-match stadium ban remained unchanged.)	6	2	0	4	6	8	−2	6		0–2	0–2	—	1–2
4	(Romania) Timișoara	6	1	2	3	4	9	−5	5		0–0	1–2	0–3	—

Source: Soccerway
Notes:
17 September 2009
19:00

Ajax (Netherlands)	0–0	(Romania) Timișoara
	Report

Amsterdam Arena, Amsterdam
Attendance: 25,391
Referee: Alon Yefet (Israel)
17 September 2009
19:00

Dinamo Zagreb (Croatia)	0–2	(Belgium) Anderlecht
	Report	Bernárdez 74'; Legear 88'

Maksimir Stadium, Zagreb
Attendance: 13,844
Referee: Zsolt Szabó (Hungary)

1 October 2009
21:05

Anderlecht (Belgium)	1–1	(Netherlands) Ajax
Legear 85'	Report	Rommedahl 72'

Constant Vanden Stock Stadium, Brussels
Attendance: 17,026
Referee: Kristinn Jakobsson (Iceland)
1 October 2009
21:05

Timișoara (Romania)	0–3	(Croatia) Dinamo Zagreb
	Report	Badelj 8'; Sammir 52'; Morales 59'

Stadionul Dan Păltinișanu, Timișoara
Attendance: 5,736
Referee: Peter Rasmussen (Denmark)

22 October 2009
21:05

Timișoara (Romania)	0–0	(Belgium) Anderlecht
	Report

Stadionul Dan Păltinișanu, Timișoara
Attendance: 6,893
Referee: Claudio Circhetta (Switzerland)
22 October 2009
21:05

Ajax (Netherlands)	2–1	(Croatia) Dinamo Zagreb
Suárez 3' (pen.); Rommedahl 81'	Report	Tomečak 90+3'

Amsterdam Arena, Amsterdam
Attendance: 30,700
Referee: Thomas Einwaller (Austria)

5 November 2009
19:00

Anderlecht (Belgium)	3–1	(Romania) Timișoara
Suárez 29' (pen.); Boussoufa 69'; Legear 90+5'	Report	Parks 51'

Constant Vanden Stock Stadium, Brussels
Attendance: 15,991
Referee: Tony Chapron (France)
5 November 2009
19:00

Dinamo Zagreb (Croatia)	0–2	(Netherlands) Ajax
	Report	Pantelić 13'; De Zeeuw 45+1'

Maksimir Stadium, Zagreb
Attendance: 0 (Note: On 29 October 2009, UEFA's Control and Disciplinary Body ruled that Dinamo Zagreb would have to play their next two home matches in the UEFA Europa League behind closed doors due to the actions of their supporters in their match at Timișoara. They also deducted three points from the Croatian club's points tally in Group A. The club appealed, but the appeal was not heard until after the first closed-doors game against Ajax. After the appeal was heard, UEFA replaced the three-point deduction with a €75,000 fine, and a three-year suspended ban from European competition, while the two-match stadium ban remained unchanged.)
Referee: Mike Dean (England)

2 December 2009
21:05

Timișoara (Romania)	1–2	(Netherlands) Ajax
Goga 2'	Report	Suárez 8'; Pantelić 46'

Stadionul Dan Păltinișanu, Timișoara
Attendance: 8,085
Referee: Paolo Tagliavento (Italy)
2 December 2009
21:05

Anderlecht (Belgium)	0–1	(Croatia) Dinamo Zagreb
	Report	Slepička 57'

Constant Vanden Stock Stadium, Brussels
Attendance: 15,622
Referee: Dougie McDonald (Scotland)

17 December 2009
19:00

Ajax (Netherlands)	1–3	(Belgium) Anderlecht
Emanuelson 77'	Report	Lukaku 13', 22'; Legear 43'

Amsterdam Arena, Amsterdam
Attendance: 36,156
Referee: Cüneyt Çakır (Turkey)
17 December 2009
19:00

Dinamo Zagreb (Croatia)	1–2	(Romania) Timișoara
Scutaru 80' (o.g.)	Report	Bucur 67'; Goga 84'

Maksimir Stadium, Zagreb
Attendance: 0
Referee: Carlos Velasco Carballo (Spain)

=== Group B ===
Pos	Team	Pld	W	D	L	GF	GA	GD	Pts	Qualification	VAL	LIL	GEN	SLV
1	(Spain) Valencia	6	3	3	0	12	8	+4	12	Advance to knockout phase	—	3–1	3–2	1–1
2	(France) Lille	6	3	1	2	15	9	+6	10	Advance to knockout phase	1–1	—	3–0	3–1
3	(Italy) Genoa	6	2	1	3	8	10	−2	7		1–2	3–2	—	2–0
4	(Czech Republic) Slavia Prague	6	0	3	3	5	13	−8	3		2–2	1–5	0–0	—

Source: Soccerway
17 September 2009
19:00

Lille (France)	1–1	(Spain) Valencia
Gervinho 86'	Report	Mata 78'

Stadium Lille-Metropole, Villeneuve-d'Ascq (Note: Lille played their home group matches in Villeneuve-d'Ascq at Stadium Lille-Metropole as Lille's Stade Grimonprez Jooris was left in 2004. In 2012, Stadium Grimonprez Jooris was replaced definitely by Stade Borne de l'Espoir.)
Attendance: 14,676
Referee: Alexandru Tudor (Romania)
17 September 2009
19:00

Genoa (Italy)	2–0	(Czech Republic) Slavia Prague
Zapater 4'; Sculli 39'	Report

Stadio Luigi Ferraris, Genoa
Attendance: 17,356
Referee: Jorge Sousa (Portugal)

1 October 2009
21:05

Slavia Prague (Czech Republic)	1–5	(France) Lille
Belaid 6' (pen.)	Report	Suchý 47' (o.g.); Frau 71'; Gervinho 85', 90+1'; Souquet 88'

Synot Tip Arena, Prague
Attendance: 9,158
Referee: Robert Schörgenhofer (Austria)
1 October 2009
21:05

Valencia (Spain)	3–2	(Italy) Genoa
Silva 52'; Žigić 56'; Villa 82' (pen.)	Report	Floccari 43'; Kharja 64' (pen.)

Mestalla, Valencia
Attendance: 21,333
Referee: Cüneyt Çakır (Turkey)

22 October 2009
21:05

Valencia (Spain)	1–1	(Czech Republic) Slavia Prague
Navarro 63'	Report	Naumov 28'

Mestalla, Valencia
Attendance: 20,632
Referee: Serge Gumienny (Belgium)
22 October 2009
21:05

Lille (France)	3–0	(Italy) Genoa
Obraniak 38'; Vittek 63'; Hazard 84'	Report

Stadium Lille-Metropole, Villeneuve-d'Ascq
Attendance: 16,518
Referee: Darko Čeferin (Slovenia)

5 November 2009
19:00

Slavia Prague (Czech Republic)	2–2	(Spain) Valencia
Janda 79'; Grajciar 82'	Report	Joaquín 22' (pen.); Maduro 47'

Synot Tip Arena, Prague
Attendance: 10,624
Referee: Svein Oddvar Moen (Norway)
5 November 2009
19:00

Genoa (Italy)	3–2	(France) Lille
Palacio 14'; Crespo 58'; Sculli 90+2'	Report	Frau 76'; Gervinho 84'

Stadio Luigi Ferraris, Genoa
Attendance: 18,587
Referee: Bas Nijhuis (Netherlands)

2 December 2009
21:05

Valencia (Spain)	3–1	(France) Lille
Joaquín 3', 32'; Mata 53'	Report	Chedjou 90+1'

Mestalla, Valencia
Attendance: 26,193
Referee: Mike Dean (England)
2 December 2009
21:05

Slavia Prague (Czech Republic)	0–0	(Italy) Genoa
	Report

Synot Tip Arena, Prague
Attendance: 11,799
Referee: Knut Kircher (Germany)

17 December 2009
19:00

Lille (France)	3–1	(Czech Republic) Slavia Prague
Cabaye 25'; Gervinho 40'; Obraniak 80'	Report	Vlček 56'

Stadium Lille-Metropole, Villeneuve-d'Ascq
Attendance: 15,358
Referee: Hannes Kaasik (Estonia)
17 December 2009
19:00

Genoa (Italy)	1–2	(Spain) Valencia
Crespo 51'	Report	Bruno 45+1'; Villa 90+5'

Stadio Luigi Ferraris, Genoa
Attendance: 23,480
Referee: Alan Kelly (Republic of Ireland)

=== Group C ===
Pos	Team	Pld	W	D	L	GF	GA	GD	Pts	Qualification	HTA	HSV	CEL	RAP
1	(Israel) Hapoel Tel Aviv	6	4	0	2	13	8	+5	12	Advance to knockout phase	—	1–0	2–1	5–1
2	(Germany) Hamburger SV	6	3	1	2	7	6	+1	10	Advance to knockout phase	4–2	—	0–0	2–0
3	(Scotland) Celtic	6	1	3	2	7	7	0	6		2–0	0–1	—	1–1
4	(Austria) Rapid Wien	6	1	2	3	8	14	−6	5		0–3	3–0	3–3	—

Source: Soccerway
17 September 2009
19:00

Hapoel Tel Aviv (Israel)	2–1	(Scotland) Celtic
Vučićević 75'; Lala 88'	Report	Samaras 25'

Bloomfield Stadium, Tel Aviv
Attendance: 9,830
Referee: Paul Allaerts (Belgium)
17 September 2009
19:00

Rapid Wien (Austria)	3–0	(Germany) Hamburger SV
Hofmann 35'; Jelavić 44'; Drazan 76'	Report

Ernst-Happel-Stadion, Vienna (Note: Rapid Wien played their home group matches at Ernst-Happel-Stadion as it had a greater capacity than their Gerhard Hanappi Stadium.)
Attendance: 49,850
Referee: Ivan Bebek (Croatia)

1 October 2009
21:05

Hamburger SV (Germany)	4–2	(Israel) Hapoel Tel Aviv
Berg 5', 12'; Elia 41'; Zé Roberto 77'	Report	Shechter 36'; Yeboah 61'

HSH Nordbank Arena, Hamburg
Attendance: 29,976
Referee: István Vad (Hungary)
1 October 2009
21:05

Celtic (Scotland)	1–1	(Austria) Rapid Wien
McDonald 21'	Report	Jelavić 4'

Celtic Park, Glasgow
Attendance: 42,013
Referee: Bruno Paixão (Portugal)

22 October 2009
21:05

Celtic (Scotland)	0–1	(Germany) Hamburger SV
	Report	Berg 63'

Celtic Park, Glasgow
Attendance: 38,821
Referee: Gianluca Rocchi (Italy)
22 October 2009
21:05

Hapoel Tel Aviv (Israel)	5–1	(Austria) Rapid Wien
Dober 30' (o.g.); Menteshashvili 54'; Shechter 59'; Vermuth 69'; Lala 90'	Report	Hofmann 31'

Bloomfield Stadium, Tel Aviv
Attendance: 11,305
Referee: Kristinn Jakobsson (Iceland)

5 November 2009
19:00

Hamburger SV (Germany)	0–0	(Scotland) Celtic
	Report

HSH Nordbank Arena, Hamburg
Attendance: 45,037
Referee: Carlos Velasco Carballo (Spain)
5 November 2009
19:00

Rapid Wien (Austria)	0–3	(Israel) Hapoel Tel Aviv
	Report	Yadin 13'; Vermuth 65'; Natcho 70'

Ernst-Happel-Stadion, Vienna
Attendance: 49,000
Referee: Tommy Skjerven (Norway)

2 December 2009
21:05

Celtic (Scotland)	2–0	(Israel) Hapoel Tel Aviv
Samaras 22'; Robson 68'	Report

Celtic Park, Glasgow
Attendance: 35,010
Referee: Tony Asumaa (Finland)
2 December 2009
21:05

Hamburger SV (Germany)	2–0	(Austria) Rapid Wien
Jansen 47'; Berg 53'	Report

HSH Nordbank Arena, Hamburg
Attendance: 45,737
Referee: Bas Nijhuis (Netherlands)

17 December 2009
19:00

Hapoel Tel Aviv (Israel)	1–0	(Germany) Hamburger SV
Yeboah 23'	Report

Bloomfield Stadium, Tel Aviv
Attendance: 15,164
Referee: Aleksei Nikolaev (Russia)
17 December 2009
19:00

Rapid Wien (Austria)	3–3	(Scotland) Celtic
Jelavić 1', 8'; Salihi 19'	Report	Fortuné 24', 67'; McGowan 90+1'

Ernst-Happel-Stadion, Vienna
Attendance: 48,300
Referee: Robert Małek (Poland)

=== Group D ===
Pos	Team	Pld	W	D	L	GF	GA	GD	Pts	Qualification	SCP	HER	HVN	VEN
1	(Portugal) Sporting CP	6	3	2	1	8	6	+2	11	Advance to knockout phase	—	1–0	1–1	1–1
2	(Germany) Hertha BSC	6	3	1	2	6	5	+1	10	Advance to knockout phase	1–0	—	0–1	1–1
3	(Netherlands) Heerenveen	6	2	2	2	11	7	+4	8		2–3	2–3	—	5–0
4	(Latvia) Ventspils	6	0	3	3	3	10	−7	3		1–2	0–1	0–0	—

Source: Soccerway
17 September 2009
19:00

Hertha BSC (Germany)	1–1	(Latvia) Ventspils
Piszczek 34'	Report	Gauračs 48'

Olympic Stadium, Berlin
Attendance: 13,454
Referee: Alan Kelly (Republic of Ireland)
17 September 2009
19:00

Heerenveen (Netherlands)	2–3	(Portugal) Sporting CP
Sibon 12'; Dingsdag 77'	Report	Liédson 17', 40', 88'

Abe Lenstra Stadion, Heerenveen
Attendance: 13,000
Referee: Aleksei Nikolaev (Russia)

1 October 2009
21:05

Sporting CP (Portugal)	1–0	(Germany) Hertha BSC
Silva 18'	Report

Estádio José Alvalade, Lisbon
Attendance: 16,197
Referee: Serge Gumienny (Belgium)
1 October 2009
21:05

Ventspils (Latvia)	0–0	(Netherlands) Heerenveen
	Report

Skonto Stadium, Riga (Note: Ventspils played their home group matches in Riga at Skonto Stadium as their Ventspils Olimpiskais Stadions did not meet UEFA criteria.)
Attendance: 3,500
Referee: Oleh Oriekhov (Ukraine)

22 October 2009
21:05

Ventspils (Latvia)	1–2	(Portugal) Sporting CP
Laizāns 64' (pen.)	Report	Veloso 6'; Moutinho 85'

Skonto Stadium, Riga
Attendance: 4,500
Referee: Sascha Kever (Switzerland)
22 October 2009
21:05

Hertha BSC (Germany)	0–1	(Netherlands) Heerenveen
	Report	Losada 36'

Olympic Stadium, Berlin
Attendance: 13,134
Referee: Costas Kapitanis (Cyprus)

5 November 2009
19:00

Sporting CP (Portugal)	1–1	(Latvia) Ventspils
Saleiro 22'	Report	Zamperini 15'

Estádio José Alvalade, Lisbon
Attendance: 18,103
Referee: Aleksandar Stavrev (Macedonia)
5 November 2009
19:00

Heerenveen (Netherlands)	2–3	(Germany) Hertha BSC
Papadopulos 3', 36'	Report	Domovchiyski 21', 52'; Wichniarek 90+1'

Abe Lenstra Stadion, Heerenveen
Attendance: 18,000
Referee: Cristian Balaj (Romania)

3 December 2009
21:05

Ventspils (Latvia)	0–1	(Germany) Hertha BSC
	Report	Raffael 12'

Skonto Stadium, Riga
Attendance: 7,200
Referee: István Vad (Hungary)
3 December 2009
21:05

Sporting CP (Portugal)	1–1	(Netherlands) Heerenveen
Grimi 90+1'	Report	Assaidi 47'

Estádio José Alvalade, Lisbon
Attendance: 12,204
Referee: Pavel Královec (Czech Republic)

16 December 2009
19:00

Hertha BSC (Germany)	1–0	(Portugal) Sporting CP
Kačar 70'	Report

Olympic Stadium, Berlin
Attendance: 14,417
Referee: Aleksei Kulbakov (Belarus)
16 December 2009
19:00

Heerenveen (Netherlands)	5–0	(Latvia) Ventspils
Väyrynen 55'; Elm 58'; Sibon 77', 78'; Janmaat 88'	Report

Abe Lenstra Stadion, Heerenveen
Attendance: 16,000
Referee: Robert Schörgenhofer (Austria)

=== Group E ===
Pos	Team	Pld	W	D	L	GF	GA	GD	Pts	Qualification	ROM	FUL	BSL	CSK
1	(Italy) Roma	6	4	1	1	10	5	+5	13	Advance to knockout phase	—	2–1	2–1	2–0
2	(England) Fulham	6	3	2	1	8	6	+2	11	Advance to knockout phase	1–1	—	1–0	1–0
3	(Switzerland) Basel	6	3	0	3	10	7	+3	9		2–0	2–3	—	3–1
4	(Bulgaria) CSKA Sofia	6	0	1	5	2	12	−10	1		0–3	1–1	0–2	—

Source: Soccerway
17 September 2009
19:00

CSKA Sofia (Bulgaria)	1–1	(England) Fulham
Platini 62'	Report	Kamara 65'

Vasil Levski National Stadium, Sofia (Note: CSKA Sofia played their home group matches at Vasil Levski National Stadium as their Balgarska Armiya Stadium did not meet UEFA criteria.)
Attendance: 28,000
Referee: Darko Čeferin (Slovenia)
17 September 2009
19:00

Basel (Switzerland)	2–0	(Italy) Roma
Carlitos 11'; Almerares 87'	Report

St. Jakob-Park, Basel
Attendance: 16,459
Referee: Carlos Velasco Carballo (Spain)

1 October 2009
21:05

Roma (Italy)	2–0	(Bulgaria) CSKA Sofia
Okaka 19'; Perrotta 23'	Report

Stadio Olimpico, Rome
Attendance: 16,027
Referee: Vladimír Hriňák (Slovakia)
1 October 2009
21:05

Fulham (England)	1–0	(Switzerland) Basel
Murphy 57'	Report

Craven Cottage, London
Attendance: 16,100
Referee: Michael Weiner (Germany)

22 October 2009
21:05

Fulham (England)	1–1	(Italy) Roma
Hangeland 24'	Report	Andreolli 90+3'

Craven Cottage, London
Attendance: 23,561
Referee: Paul Allaerts (Belgium)
22 October 2009
21:05

CSKA Sofia (Bulgaria)	0–2	(Switzerland) Basel
	Report	Frei 20', 63'

Vasil Levski National Stadium, Sofia
Attendance: 17,664
Referee: Jorge Sousa (Portugal)

5 November 2009
19:00

Roma (Italy)	2–1	(England) Fulham
Riise 69'; Okaka 76'	Report	Kamara 19' (pen.)

Stadio Olimpico, Rome
Attendance: 14,457
Referee: Kevin Blom (Netherlands)
5 November 2009
19:00

Basel (Switzerland)	3–1	(Bulgaria) CSKA Sofia
Gelabert 35'; Frei 41' (pen.), 67'	Report	Yanchev 61'

St. Jakob-Park, Basel
Attendance: 15,255
Referee: Oleh Oriekhov (Ukraine)

3 December 2009
21:05

Fulham (England)	1–0	(Bulgaria) CSKA Sofia
Gera 15'	Report

Craven Cottage, London
Attendance: 23,604
Referee: Cristian Balaj (Romania)
3 December 2009
21:05

Roma (Italy)	2–1	(Switzerland) Basel
Totti 32' (pen.); Vučinić 59'	Report	Huggel 18'

Stadio Olimpico, Rome
Attendance: 17,332
Referee: Tony Chapron (France)

16 December 2009
19:00

CSKA Sofia (Bulgaria)	0–3	(Italy) Roma
	Report	Cerci 45+1', 52'; Scardina 89'

Vasil Levski National Stadium, Sofia
Attendance: 9,700
Referee: Aleksandar Stavrev (Macedonia)
16 December 2009
19:00

Basel (Switzerland)	2–3	(England) Fulham
Frei 64' (pen.); Streller 87'	Report	Zamora 41', 45'; Gera 77'

St. Jakob-Park, Basel
Attendance: 20,063
Referee: Stefan Johannesson (Sweden)

=== Group F ===
Pos	Team	Pld	W	D	L	GF	GA	GD	Pts	Qualification	GAL	PAN	DB	STM
1	(Turkey) Galatasaray	6	4	1	1	12	4	+8	13	Advance to knockout phase	—	1–0	4–1	1–1
2	(Greece) Panathinaikos	6	4	0	2	7	4	+3	12	Advance to knockout phase	1–3	—	3–0	1–0
3	(Romania) Dinamo București	6	2	0	4	4	12	−8	6		0–3	0–1	—	2–1
4	(Austria) Sturm Graz	6	1	1	4	3	6	−3	4		1–0	0–1	0–1	—

Source: Soccerway
17 September 2009
19:00

Panathinaikos (Greece)	1–3	(Turkey) Galatasaray
Salpingidis 78'	Report	Elano 5'; Baroš 48'; Sarriegi 58' (o.g.)

Olympic Stadium, Athens (Note: Panathinaikos played their group matches in Athens at Olympic Stadium as Panathinaikos' Leoforos Alexandras Stadium had been replaced temporarily by that stadium. In 2010, Leoforos Alexandras Stadium was replaced definitely by Marfin Stadium.)
Attendance: 46,791
Referee: Paolo Tagliavento (Italy)
17 September 2009
19:00

Sturm Graz (Austria)	0–1	(Romania) Dinamo București
	Report	Tamaș 80'

UPC-Arena, Graz
Attendance: 15,323
Referee: Tony Asumaa (Finland)

1 October 2009
21:05

Dinamo București (Romania)	0–1	(Greece) Panathinaikos
	Report	Karagounis 79'

Stadionul Dinamo, Bucharest
Attendance: 100 (Note: Two home matches which Dinamo București had to play behind closed doors because one fan entered the playing field and other fans invaded the running track around the pitch in the play-off round against Slovan Liberec.)
Referee: César Muñiz Fernández (Spain)
1 October 2009
21:05

Galatasaray (Turkey)	1–1	(Austria) Sturm Graz
Baroš 63'	Report	Beichler 45+1'

Ali Sami Yen Stadium, Istanbul
Attendance: 18,334
Referee: Bas Nijhuis (Netherlands)

22 October 2009
21:05

Galatasaray (Turkey)	4–1	(Romania) Dinamo București
Kewell 32'; Nonda 42', 46'; Elano 58' (pen.)	Report	Boștină 61'

Ali Sami Yen Stadium, Istanbul
Attendance: 18,902
Referee: Martin Ingvarsson (Sweden)
22 October 2009
21:05

Panathinaikos (Greece)	1–0	(Austria) Sturm Graz
Salpingidis 60' (pen.)	Report

Olympic Stadium, Athens
Attendance: 31,127
Referee: Peter Rasmussen (Denmark)

5 November 2009
19:00

Dinamo București (Romania)	0–3	(Turkey) Galatasaray
	Report	Kewell 22'; Nonda 24'; Mehmet 56'

Stadionul Dinamo, Bucharest
Attendance: 0
Referee: Michael Weiner (Germany)
5 November 2009
19:00

Sturm Graz (Austria)	0–1	(Greece) Panathinaikos
	Report	Katsouranis 70'

UPC-Arena, Graz
Attendance: 15,322
Referee: Pavel Královec (Czech Republic)

3 December 2009
21:05

Galatasaray (Turkey)	1–0	(Greece) Panathinaikos
Gilberto 50' (o.g.)	Report

Ali Sami Yen Stadium, Istanbul
Attendance: 18,566
Referee: Ivan Bebek (Croatia)
3 December 2009
21:05

Dinamo București (Romania)	2–1	(Austria) Sturm Graz
Niculae 41', 57'	Report	Sonnleitner 5'

Stadionul Dinamo, Bucharest
Attendance: 1,821
Referee: Bruno Paixão (Portugal)

16 December 2009
19:00

Panathinaikos (Greece)	3–0	(Romania) Dinamo București
Rukavina 54'; Cissé 80', 85'	Report

Olympic Stadium, Athens
Attendance: 19,617
Referee: Kevin Blom (Netherlands)
16 December 2009
19:00

Sturm Graz (Austria)	1–0	(Turkey) Galatasaray
Beichler 20'	Report

UPC-Arena, Graz
Attendance: 15,232
Referee: Darko Čeferin (Slovenia)

=== Group G ===
Pos	Team	Pld	W	D	L	GF	GA	GD	Pts	Qualification	SBG	VIL	LAZ	LS
1	(Austria) Red Bull Salzburg	6	6	0	0	9	2	+7	18	Advance to knockout phase	—	2–0	2–1	1–0
2	(Spain) Villarreal	6	3	0	3	8	6	+2	9	Advance to knockout phase	0–1	—	4–1	1–0
3	(Italy) Lazio	6	2	0	4	9	10	−1	6		1–2	2–1	—	0–1
4	(Bulgaria) Levski Sofia	6	1	0	5	1	9	−8	3		0–1	0–2	0–4	—

Source: Soccerway
17 September 2009
21:05

Lazio (Italy)	1–2	(Austria) Red Bull Salzburg
Foggia 59'	Report	Schiemer 82'; Janko 90+3'

Stadio Olimpico, Rome
Attendance: 12,600
Referee: Saïd Ennjimi (France)
17 September 2009
21:05

Villarreal (Spain)	1–0	(Bulgaria) Levski Sofia
Nilmar 72'	Report

El Madrigal, Villarreal
Attendance: 5,244
Referee: Mike Dean (England)

1 October 2009
19:00

Levski Sofia (Bulgaria)	0–4	(Italy) Lazio
	Report	Matuzalém 22'; Zárate 45+1'; Meghni 67'; Rocchi 74'

Georgi Asparuhov Stadium, Sofia
Attendance: 16,500
Referee: Nikolay Ivanov (Russia)
1 October 2009
19:00

Red Bull Salzburg (Austria)	2–0	(Spain) Villarreal
Janko 21'; Tchoyi 84'	Report

Red Bull Arena, Salzburg
Attendance: 18,800
Referee: Costas Kapitanis (Cyprus)

22 October 2009
19:00

Red Bull Salzburg (Austria)	1–0	(Bulgaria) Levski Sofia
Švento 45+2'	Report

Red Bull Arena, Salzburg
Attendance: 17,800
Referee: Hannes Kaasik (Estonia)
22 October 2009
19:00

Lazio (Italy)	2–1	(Spain) Villarreal
Zárate 20'; Rocchi 90+2'	Report	Eguren 40'

Stadio Olimpico, Rome
Attendance: 14,388
Referee: Ivan Bebek (Croatia)

5 November 2009
21:05

Levski Sofia (Bulgaria)	0–1	(Austria) Red Bull Salzburg
	Report	Schiemer 90+3'

Georgi Asparuhov Stadium, Sofia
Attendance: 5,000
Referee: Cüneyt Çakır (Turkey)
5 November 2009
21:05

Villarreal (Spain)	4–1	(Italy) Lazio
Pires 2', 15' (pen.); Cani 13'; Rossi 83' (pen.)	Report	Zárate 73'

El Madrigal, Villarreal
Attendance: 14,114
Referee: Knut Kircher (Germany)

2 December 2009
19:00

Red Bull Salzburg (Austria)	2–1	(Italy) Lazio
Afolabi 52'; Tchoyi 78'	Report	Foggia 57'

Red Bull Arena, Salzburg
Attendance: 26,270
Referee: Alexandru Tudor (Romania)
2 December 2009
19:00

Levski Sofia (Bulgaria)	0–2	(Spain) Villarreal
	Report	Rossi 36'; Senna 84'

Georgi Asparuhov Stadium, Sofia
Attendance: 5,600
Referee: Paul Allaerts (Belgium)

17 December 2009
21:05

Lazio (Italy)	0–1	(Bulgaria) Levski Sofia
	Report	Yovov 61'

Stadio Olimpico, Rome
Attendance: 8,051
Referee: William Collum (Scotland)
17 December 2009
21:05

Villarreal (Spain)	0–1	(Austria) Red Bull Salzburg
	Report	Švento 7'

El Madrigal, Villarreal
Attendance: 5,860
Referee: Vladimír Hriňák (Slovakia)

=== Group H ===
Pos	Team	Pld	W	D	L	GF	GA	GD	Pts	Qualification	FEN	TWE	SHF	STE
1	(Turkey) Fenerbahçe	6	5	0	1	8	3	+5	15	Advance to knockout phase	—	1–2	1–0	3–1
2	(Netherlands) Twente	6	2	2	2	5	6	−1	8	Advance to knockout phase	0–1	—	2–1	0–0
3	(Moldova) Sheriff Tiraspol	6	1	2	3	4	5	−1	5		0–1	2–0	—	1–1
4	(Romania) Steaua București	6	0	4	2	3	6	−3	4		0–1	1–1	0–0	—

Source: Soccerway
17 September 2009
21:05

Steaua București (Romania)	0–0	(Moldova) Sheriff Tiraspol
	Report

Stadionul Steaua, Bucharest
Attendance: 0 (Note: The second of two home matches which Steaua București had to play behind closed doors because their fans had flown offensive banners to Újpest in the second qualifying round.)
Referee: Pavel Královec (Czech Republic)
17 September 2009
21:05

Fenerbahçe (Turkey)	1–2	(Netherlands) Twente
Topuz 71'	Report	Nkufo 75', 80'

Şükrü Saracoğlu Stadium, Istanbul
Attendance: 27,172
Referee: Claudio Circhetta (Switzerland)

1 October 2009
19:00

Twente (Netherlands)	0–0	(Romania) Steaua București
	Report

De Grolsch Veste, Enschede
Attendance: 19,200
Referee: Gianluca Rocchi (Italy)
1 October 2009
19:00

Sheriff Tiraspol (Moldova)	0–1	(Turkey) Fenerbahçe
	Report	Alex 53'

Sheriff Stadium, Tiraspol
Attendance: 11,634
Referee: Aleksandar Stavrev (Belarus)

22 October 2009
19:00

Sheriff Tiraspol (Moldova)	2–0	(Netherlands) Twente
Balima 41'; Jymmy 90+4'	Report

Sheriff Stadium, Tiraspol
Attendance: 6,350
Referee: Tony Asumaa (Finland)
22 October 2009
19:00

Steaua București (Romania)	0–1	(Turkey) Fenerbahçe
	Report	Kazim-Richards 59'

Stadionul Steaua, Bucharest
Attendance: 10,500
Referee: Dougie McDonald (Scotland)

5 November 2009
21:05

Twente (Netherlands)	2–1	(Moldova) Sheriff Tiraspol
Stoch 7', 89'	Report	Tioté 67' (o.g.)

De Grolsch Veste, Enschede
Attendance: 20,200
Referee: Aleksei Kulbakov (Belarus)
5 November 2009
21:05

Fenerbahçe (Turkey)	3–1	(Romania) Steaua București
Santos 15'; Bilica 51'; Alex 67'	Report	Kapetanos 38'

Şükrü Saracoğlu Stadium, Istanbul
Attendance: 24,080
Referee: Thomas Einwaller (Austria)

2 December 2009
19:00

Sheriff Tiraspol (Moldova)	1–1	(Romania) Steaua București
Diedhiou 83'	Report	Toja 87'

Sheriff Stadium, Tiraspol
Attendance: 10,000
Referee: Tommy Skjerven (Norway)
2 December 2009
19:00

Twente (Netherlands)	0–1	(Turkey) Fenerbahçe
	Report	Lugano 71'

De Grolsch Veste, Enschede
Attendance: 23,700
Referee: César Muñiz Fernández (Spain)

17 December 2009
21:05

Steaua București (Romania)	1–1	(Netherlands) Twente
Kapetanos 18'	Report	Stam 35'

Stadionul Steaua, Bucharest
Attendance: 2,400
Referee: Jorge Sousa (Portugal)
17 December 2009
21:05

Fenerbahçe (Turkey)	1–0	(Moldova) Sheriff Tiraspol
Boral 15'	Report

Şükrü Saracoğlu Stadium, Istanbul
Attendance: 15,498
Referee: Zsolt Szabó (Hungary)

=== Group I ===
Pos	Team	Pld	W	D	L	GF	GA	GD	Pts	Qualification	BEN	EVE	BTE	AEK
1	(Portugal) Benfica	6	5	0	1	13	3	+10	15	Advance to knockout phase	—	5–0	2–0	2–1
2	(England) Everton	6	3	0	3	7	9	−2	9	Advance to knockout phase	0–2	—	0–1	4–0
3	(Belarus) BATE Borisov	6	2	1	3	7	9	−2	7		1–2	1–2	—	2–1
4	(Greece) AEK Athens	6	1	1	4	5	11	−6	4		1–0	0–1	2–2	—

Source: Soccerway
17 September 2009
21:05

Benfica (Portugal)	2–0	(Belarus) BATE Borisov
Nuno Gomes 36'; Cardozo 41'	Report

Estádio da Luz, Lisbon
Attendance: 34,953
Referee: Knut Kircher (Germany)
17 September 2009
21:05

Everton (England)	4–0	(Greece) AEK Athens
Yobo 10'; Distin 17'; Pienaar 37'; Jô 82'	Report

Goodison Park, Liverpool
Attendance: 26,747
Referee: Robert Małek (Poland)

1 October 2009
19:00

AEK Athens (Greece)	1–0	(Portugal) Benfica
Majstorović 43'	Report

Olympic Stadium, Athens
Attendance: 12,420
Referee: Stefan Johannesson (Sweden)
1 October 2009
19:00

BATE Borisov (Belarus)	1–2	(England) Everton
Likhtarovich 16'	Report	Fellaini 68'; Cahill 77'

Dinamo Stadium, Minsk (Note: BATE Borisov played their home group matches in Minsk at Dinamo Stadium as their Haradski Stadium did not meet UEFA criteria.)
Attendance: 21,200
Referee: Cristian Balaj (Romania)

22 October 2009
19:00

BATE Borisov (Belarus)	2–1	(Greece) AEK Athens
Pawlaw 51'; Alumona 85'	Report	Blanco 31' (pen.)

Dinamo Stadium, Minsk
Attendance: 9,200
Referee: Zsolt Szabó (Hungary)
22 October 2009
19:00

Benfica (Portugal)	5–0	(England) Everton
Saviola 14', 83'; Cardozo 47', 48'; Luisão 52'	Report

Estádio da Luz, Lisbon
Attendance: 44,534
Referee: Nikolay Ivanov (Russia)

5 November 2009
21:05

AEK Athens (Greece)	2–2	(Belarus) BATE Borisov
Blanco 1'; Manduca 38'	Report	Rodionov 17'; Valodzka 25'

Olympic Stadium, Athens
Attendance: 9,716
Referee: Alon Yefet (Israel)
5 November 2009
21:05

Everton (England)	0–2	(Portugal) Benfica
	Report	Saviola 63'; Cardozo 76'

Goodison Park, Liverpool
Attendance: 30,790
Referee: Saïd Ennjimi (France)

2 December 2009
19:00

BATE Borisov (Belarus)	1–2	(Portugal) Benfica
Vítor 69' (o.g.)	Report	Saviola 46'; Coentrão 63'

Dinamo Stadium, Minsk
Attendance: 11,200
Referee: Thomas Einwaller (Austria)
2 December 2009
19:00

AEK Athens (Greece)	0–1	(England) Everton
	Report	Bilyaletdinov 6'

Olympic Stadium, Athens
Attendance: 12,141
Referee: Claudio Circhetta (Switzerland)

17 December 2009
21:05

Benfica (Portugal)	2–1	(Greece) AEK Athens
Di María 45', 73'	Report	Blanco 84'

Estádio da Luz, Lisbon
Attendance: 20,155
Referee: Gianluca Rocchi (Italy)
17 December 2009
21:05

Everton (England)	0–1	(Belarus) BATE Borisov
	Report	Yurevich 75'

Goodison Park, Liverpool
Attendance: 18,242
Referee: Selçuk Dereli (Turkey)

=== Group J ===
Pos	Team	Pld	W	D	L	GF	GA	GD	Pts	Qualification	SHA	BRU	TOU	PTZ
1	(Ukraine) Shakhtar Donetsk	6	4	1	1	14	3	+11	13	Advance to knockout phase	—	0–0	4–0	4–1
2	(Belgium) Club Brugge	6	3	2	1	10	8	+2	11	Advance to knockout phase	1–4	—	1–0	2–0
3	(France) Toulouse	6	2	1	3	6	11	−5	7		0–2	2–2	—	1–0
4	(Serbia) Partizan	6	1	0	5	6	14	−8	3		1–0	2–4	2–3	—

Source: Soccerway
17 September 2009
21:05

Club Brugge (Belgium)	1–4	(Ukraine) Shakhtar Donetsk
Geraerts 62'	Report	Gai 11'; Willian 19'; Srna 35'; Kravchenko 75'

Jan Breydel Stadium, Bruges
Attendance: 17,770
Referee: Martin Ingvarsson (Sweden)
17 September 2009
21:05

Partizan (Serbia)	2–3	(France) Toulouse
Krstajić 23'; Cléo 67'	Report	Sirieix 30', 38'; Devaux 49'

Partizan Stadium, Belgrade
Attendance: 13,845
Referee: Selçuk Dereli (Turkey)

1 October 2009
19:00

Toulouse (France)	2–2	(Belgium) Club Brugge
Sissoko 54'; Gignac 84'	Report	Akpala 52'; Perišić 90+4'

Stadium Municipal, Toulouse
Attendance: 12,215
Referee: Sascha Kever (Switzerland)
1 October 2009
19:00

Shakhtar Donetsk (Ukraine)	4–1	(Serbia) Partizan
Lomić 24' (o.g.); Luiz Adriano 39'; Jádson 54'; Rakitskyi 67'	Report	Ljajić 86'

Donbas Arena, Donetsk
Attendance: 49,480
Referee: William Collum (Scotland)

22 October 2009
19:00

Shakhtar Donetsk (Ukraine)	4–0	(France) Toulouse
Fernandinho 7' (pen.); Luiz Adriano 24', 56'; Hübschman 38'	Report

Donbas Arena, Donetsk
Attendance: 50,217
Referee: Bruno Paixão (Portugal)
22 October 2009
19:00

Club Brugge (Belgium)	2–0	(Serbia) Partizan
Perišić 4'; Brežančić 58' (o.g.)	Report

Jan Breydel Stadium, Bruges
Attendance: 18,903
Referee: Mike Dean (England)

5 November 2009
21:05

Toulouse (France)	0–2	(Ukraine) Shakhtar Donetsk
	Report	Luiz Adriano 50'; Gai 63'

Stadium Municipal, Toulouse
Attendance: 12,046
Referee: César Muñiz Fernández (Spain)
5 November 2009
21:05

Partizan (Serbia)	2–4	(Belgium) Club Brugge
Ljajić 52'; Washington 66'	Report	Perišić 28'; Kouemaha 36', 57'; Odjidja-Ofoe 74'

Partizan Stadium, Belgrade
Attendance: 6,290
Referee: Robert Schörgenhofer (Austria)

3 December 2009
19:00

Shakhtar Donetsk (Ukraine)	0–0	(Belgium) Club Brugge
	Report

Donbas Arena, Donetsk
Attendance: 46,089
Referee: Zsolt Szabó (Hungary)
3 December 2009
19:00

Toulouse (France)	1–0	(Serbia) Partizan
Braaten 54'	Report

Stadium Municipal, Toulouse
Attendance: 11,123
Referee: Kristinn Jakobsson (Iceland)

16 December 2009
21:05

Club Brugge (Belgium)	1–0	(France) Toulouse
Perišić 90+2'	Report

Jan Breydel Stadium, Bruges
Attendance: 23,668
Referee: Svein Oddvar Moen (Norway)
16 December 2009
21:05

Partizan (Serbia)	1–0	(Ukraine) Shakhtar Donetsk
Diarra 6'	Report

Partizan Stadium, Belgrade
Attendance: 2,000
Referee: Michael Weiner (Germany)

=== Group K ===
Pos	Team	Pld	W	D	L	GF	GA	GD	Pts	Qualification	PSV	FCK	PRA	CLU
1	(Netherlands) PSV Eindhoven	6	4	2	0	8	3	+5	14	Advance to knockout phase	—	1–0	1–0	1–0
2	(Denmark) Copenhagen	6	3	1	2	7	4	+3	10	Advance to knockout phase	1–1	—	1–0	2–0
3	(Czech Republic) Sparta Prague	6	2	1	3	7	9	−2	7		2–2	0–3	—	2–0
4	(Romania) CFR Cluj	6	1	0	5	4	10	−6	3		0–2	2–0	2–3	—

Source: Soccerway
17 September 2009
21:05

Sparta Prague (Czech Republic)	2–2	(Netherlands) PSV Eindhoven
Hubník 76'; Zeman 87'	Report	Reis 80', 90+1' (pen.)

Generali Arena, Prague
Attendance: 16,703
Referee: Dougie McDonald (Scotland)
17 September 2009
21:05

CFR Cluj (Romania)	2–0	(Denmark) Copenhagen
Culio 53'; Traoré 75'	Report

Stadionul Dr. Constantin Rădulescu, Cluj-Napoca
Attendance: 8,414
Referee: Aleksei Kulbakov (Belarus)

1 October 2009
19:00

Copenhagen (Denmark)	1–0	(Czech Republic) Sparta Prague
N'Doye 25'	Report

Parken Stadium, Copenhagen
Attendance: 15,043
Referee: Hannes Kaasik (Estonia)
1 October 2009
19:00

PSV Eindhoven (Netherlands)	1–0	(Romania) CFR Cluj
Bakkal 9'	Report

Philips Stadion, Eindhoven
Attendance: 13,500
Referee: Tommy Skjerven (Norway)

22 October 2009
19:00

PSV Eindhoven (Netherlands)	1–0	(Denmark) Copenhagen
Reis 72'	Report

Philips Stadion, Eindhoven
Attendance: 17,000
Referee: Alan Kelly (Republic of Ireland)
22 October 2009
19:00

Sparta Prague (Czech Republic)	2–0	(Romania) CFR Cluj
Kucka 15'; Hubník 32'	Report

Generali Arena, Prague
Attendance: 10,133
Referee: Aleksei Nikolaev (Russia)

5 November 2009
21:05

Copenhagen (Denmark)	1–1	(Netherlands) PSV Eindhoven
Grønkjær 39' (pen.)	Report	Dzsudzsák 72'

Parken Stadium, Copenhagen
Attendance: 21,605
Referee: Vladimír Hriňák (Slovakia)
5 November 2009
21:05

CFR Cluj (Romania)	2–3	(Czech Republic) Sparta Prague
Traoré 25'; Dubarbier 90+1'	Report	Holenda 6', 13'; Wilfried 90+6'

Stadionul Dr. Constantin Rădulescu, Cluj-Napoca
Attendance: 7,227
Referee: Selçuk Dereli (Turkey)

3 December 2009
19:00

PSV Eindhoven (Netherlands)	1–0	(Czech Republic) Sparta Prague
Reis 90+1'	Report

Philips Stadion, Eindhoven
Attendance: 26,400
Referee: Martin Ingvarsson (Sweden)
3 December 2009
19:00

Copenhagen (Denmark)	2–0	(Romania) CFR Cluj
Vingaard 37'; N'Doye 43'	Report

Parken Stadium, Copenhagen
Attendance: 11,567
Referee: Darko Čeferin (Slovenia)

16 December 2009
21:05

Sparta Prague (Czech Republic)	0–3	(Denmark) Copenhagen
	Report	N'Doye 22', 30'; Grønkjær 54' (pen.)

Generali Arena, Prague
Attendance: 17,151
Referee: Sascha Kever (Switzerland)
16 December 2009
21:05

CFR Cluj (Romania)	0–2	(Netherlands) PSV Eindhoven
	Report	Lazović 19' (pen.); Amrabat 68'

Stadionul Dr. Constantin Rădulescu, Cluj-Napoca
Attendance: 3,000
Referee: Saïd Ennjimi (France)

=== Group L ===
Pos	Team	Pld	W	D	L	GF	GA	GD	Pts	Qualification	BRM	ATH	NCL	AUS
1	(Germany) Werder Bremen	6	5	1	0	17	6	+11	16	Advance to knockout phase	—	3–1	4–1	2–0
2	(Spain) Athletic Bilbao	6	3	1	2	10	8	+2	10	Advance to knockout phase	0–3	—	2–1	3–0
3	(Portugal) Nacional	6	1	2	3	11	12	−1	5		2–3	1–1	—	5–1
4	Austria Wien	6	0	2	4	4	16	−12	2		2–2	0–3	1–1	—

Source: Soccerway
17 September 2009
21:05

Athletic Bilbao (Spain)	3–0	Austria Wien
Llorente 8' (pen.), 24'; Muniain 56'	Report

San Mamés, Bilbao
Attendance: 26,000
Referee: Kevin Blom (Netherlands)
17 September 2009
21:05

Nacional (Portugal)	2–3	(Germany) Werder Bremen
Lopes 68'; Halliche 75'	Report	Frings 39' (pen.); Pizarro 55', 85'

Estádio da Madeira, Funchal
Attendance: 3,082
Referee: Svein Oddvar Moen (Norway)

1 October 2009
19:00

Werder Bremen (Germany)	3–1	(Spain) Athletic Bilbao
Hunt 18'; Naldo 41'; Frings 90+4' (pen.)	Report	Llorente 90+1'

Weserstadion, Bremen
Attendance: 24,305
Referee: Alexandru Tudor (Romania)
1 October 2009
19:00

Austria Wien	1–1	(Portugal) Nacional
Schumacher 76'	Report	Micael 35'

Franz Horr Stadium, Vienna
Attendance: 11,000
Referee: Tony Chapron (France)

22 October 2009
19:00

Austria Wien	2–2	(Germany) Werder Bremen
Sulimani 73'; Schumacher 87'	Report	Pizarro 19', 63'

Franz Horr Stadium, Vienna
Attendance: 11,000
Referee: Paolo Tagliavento (Italy)
22 October 2009
19:00

Athletic Bilbao (Spain)	2–1	(Portugal) Nacional
Etxeberria 67'; Llorente 86'	Report	Micael 42'

San Mamés, Bilbao
Attendance: 24,569
Referee: István Vad (Hungary)

5 November 2009
21:05

Werder Bremen (Germany)	2–0	Austria Wien
Borowski 81'; Almeida 84'	Report

Weserstadion, Bremen
Attendance: 25,121
Referee: Stefan Johannesson (Sweden)
5 November 2009
21:05

Nacional (Portugal)	1–1	(Spain) Athletic Bilbao
Edgar 64' (pen.)	Report	Etxeberria 85' (pen.)

Estádio da Madeira, Funchal
Attendance: 2,945
Referee: William Collum (Scotland)

3 December 2009
19:00

Austria Wien	0–3	(Spain) Athletic Bilbao
	Report	Llorente 19', 84'; San José 62'

Franz Horr Stadium, Vienna
Attendance: 11,500
Referee: Svein Oddvar Moen (Norway)
3 December 2009
19:00

Werder Bremen (Germany)	4–1	(Portugal) Nacional
Rosenberg 31', 34'; Moreno 84'; Marin 90+2'	Report	Micael 61'

Weserstadion, Bremen
Attendance: 24,784
Referee: Alon Yefet (Israel)

16 December 2009
21:05

Athletic Bilbao (Spain)	0–3	(Germany) Werder Bremen
	Report	Pizarro 13'; Naldo 20'; Rosenberg 36'

San Mamés, Bilbao
Attendance: 27,500
Referee: Serge Gumienny (Belgium)
16 December 2009
21:05

Nacional (Portugal)	5–1	Austria Wien
Micael 23', 57'; Mateus 33'; Tomašević 61'; Lopes 66'	Report	Schumacher 21'

Estádio da Madeira, Funchal
Attendance: 1,368
Referee: Costas Kapitanis (Cyprus)
