= 2009–10 UEFA Europa League knockout phase =

International football competition

The knockout phase of the 2009–10 UEFA Europa League began on 18 February, and concluded with the final at the Volksparkstadion in Hamburg, Germany on 12 May 2010. The knockout phase involved the 24 teams that finished in the top two in each group in the group stage and the eight teams that finished in third place in the UEFA Champions League group stage.

All times are CET/CEST, as listed by UEFA.

== Format ==
Each tie in the knockout phase, apart from the final, was played over two legs, with each team playing one leg at home. The team that had the higher aggregate score over the two legs progressed to the next round. In the event that aggregate scores finished level, the team that scored more goals away from home over the two legs progressed. If away goals were also equal, 30 minutes of extra time were played. If goals were scored during extra time and the aggregate score was still level, the visiting team qualified by virtue of more away goals scored. If no goals were scored during extra time, there would be a penalty shootout after extra time.

In the final, the tie was played over just one leg at a neutral venue. If scores were level at the end of normal time in the final, extra time would be played, followed by penalties if scores remained tied. The mechanism of the draws for each round was as follows:

- In the draw for the round of 32, the twelve group winners and the four third-placed teams from the Champions League group stage with the better group records were seeded, and the twelve group runners-up and the other four third-placed teams from the Champions League group stage were unseeded. The seeded teams were drawn against the unseeded teams, with the seeded teams hosting the second leg. Teams from the same group or the same association could not be drawn against each other.
- In the draws for the round of 16, quarter-finals, and semi-finals, there were no seedings, and teams from the same group or the same association could be drawn against each other. As the draws for the quarter-finals and semi-finals were held together before the quarter-finals were played, the identity of the quarter-final winners was not known at the time of the semi-final draw. A draw was also held to determine which semi-final winner was designated as the "home" team for the final (for administrative purposes as it was played at a neutral venue).

== Qualified teams ==
=== Europa League group stage winners and runners-up ===
Group	Winners (seeded in round of 32 draw)	Runners-up (unseeded in round of 32 draw)
A	(Belgium) Anderlecht	(Netherlands) Ajax
B	(Spain) Valencia	(France) Lille
C	(Israel) Hapoel Tel Aviv	(Germany) Hamburger SV
D	(Portugal) Sporting CP	(Germany) Hertha BSC
E	(Italy) Roma	(England) Fulham
F	(Turkey) Galatasaray	(Greece) Panathinaikos
G	(Austria) Red Bull Salzburg	(Spain) Villarreal
H	(Turkey) Fenerbahçe	(Netherlands) Twente
I	(Portugal) Benfica	(England) Everton
J	(Ukraine) Shakhtar Donetsk	(Belgium) Club Brugge
K	(Netherlands) PSV Eindhoven	(Denmark) Copenhagen
L	(Germany) Werder Bremen	(Spain) Athletic Bilbao

=== Champions League group stage third-placed teams ===
Seed	Grp	Team	Pld	W	D	L	GF	GA	GD	Pts	Seeding
1	G	(Romania) Unirea Urziceni	6	2	2	2	8	8	0	8	Seeded in round of 32 draw
2	A	(Italy) Juventus	6	2	2	2	4	7	−3	8	Seeded in round of 32 draw
3	B	(Germany) VfL Wolfsburg	6	2	1	3	9	8	+1	7	Seeded in round of 32 draw
4	C	(France) Marseille	6	2	1	3	10	10	0	7	Seeded in round of 32 draw
5	E	(England) Liverpool	6	2	1	3	5	7	−2	7	Unseeded in round of 32 draw
6	F	(Russia) Rubin Kazan	6	1	3	2	4	7	−3	6	Unseeded in round of 32 draw
7	H	(Belgium) Standard Liège	6	1	2	3	7	9	−2	5	Unseeded in round of 32 draw
8	D	(Spain) Atlético Madrid	6	0	3	3	3	12	−9	3	Unseeded in round of 32 draw

Source: UEFA
Rules for classification: 1) Points; 2) Goal difference; 3) Goals scored; 4) Club coefficient.

== Bracket ==
Round of 32
(Belgium) Club Brugge	1	0	1
(Spain) Valencia (a.e.t.)	0	3	3
(Netherlands) Twente	1	1	2
(Germany) Werder Bremen	0	4	4
(Spain) Atlético Madrid	1	2	3
(Turkey) Galatasaray	1	1	2
(England) Everton	2	0	2
(Portugal) Sporting CP	1	3	4
(Germany) Hertha BSC	1	0	1
(Portugal) Benfica	1	4	5
(Denmark) Copenhagen	1	1	2
(France) Marseille	3	3	6
(France) Lille	2	1	3
(Turkey) Fenerbahçe	1	1	2
(England) Liverpool	1	3	4
(Romania) Unirea Urziceni	0	1	1
(Germany) Hamburger SV (a)	1	2	3
(Netherlands) PSV Eindhoven	0	3	3
(Spain) Athletic Bilbao	1	0	1
(Belgium) Anderlecht	1	4	5
(Greece) Panathinaikos	3	3	6
(Italy) Roma	2	2	4
(Belgium) Standard Liège	3	0	3
(Austria) Red Bull Salzburg	2	0	2
(Netherlands) Ajax	1	0	1
(Italy) Juventus	2	0	2
(England) Fulham	2	1	3
(Ukraine) Shakhtar Donetsk	1	1	2
(Russia) Rubin Kazan	3	0	3
(Israel) Hapoel Tel Aviv	0	0	0
(Spain) Villarreal	2	1	3
(Germany) VfL Wolfsburg	2	4	6

Round of 16
(Spain) Valencia (a)	1	4	5
(Germany) Werder Bremen	1	4	5
(Spain) Atlético Madrid (a)	0	2	2
(Portugal) Sporting CP	0	2	2
(Portugal) Benfica	1	2	3
(France) Marseille	1	1	2
(France) Lille	1	0	1
(England) Liverpool	0	3	3
(Germany) Hamburger SV	3	3	6
(Belgium) Anderlecht	1	4	5
(Greece) Panathinaikos	1	0	1
(Belgium) Standard Liège	3	1	4
(Italy) Juventus	3	1	4
(England) Fulham	1	4	5
(Russia) Rubin Kazan	1	1	2
(Germany) VfL Wolfsburg (a.e.t.)	1	2	3

Quarter-finals
(Spain) Valencia	2	0	2
(Spain) Atlético Madrid (a)	2	0	2
(Portugal) Benfica	2	1	3
(England) Liverpool	1	4	5
(Germany) Hamburger SV	2	3	5
(Belgium) Standard Liège	1	1	2
(England) Fulham	2	1	3
(Germany) VfL Wolfsburg	1	0	1

Semi-finals
(Spain) Atlético Madrid (a.e.t.; a)	1	1	2
(England) Liverpool	0	2	2
(Germany) Hamburger SV	0	1	1
(England) Fulham	0	2	2

Final
12 May – Hamburg
(Spain) Atlético Madrid (a.e.t.)	2
(England) Fulham	1

== Round of 32 ==
The draw for the round of 32 took place on 18 December 2009.

=== Summary ===
The first legs were played on 16 and 18 February, and the second legs were played on 23 and 25 February 2010.

Team 1	Agg.	Team 2	1st leg	2nd leg
Rubin Kazan (Russia)	3–0	(Israel) Hapoel Tel Aviv	3–0	0–0
Athletic Bilbao (Spain)	1–5	(Belgium) Anderlecht	1–1	0–4
Copenhagen (Denmark)	2–6	(France) Marseille	1–3	1–3
Panathinaikos (Greece)	6–4	(Italy) Roma	3–2	3–2
Atlético Madrid (Spain)	3–2	(Turkey) Galatasaray	1–1	2–1
Ajax (Netherlands)	1–2	(Italy) Juventus	1–2	0–0
Club Brugge (Belgium)	1–3	(Spain) Valencia	1–0	0–3 (a.e.t.)
Fulham (England)	3–2	(Ukraine) Shakhtar Donetsk	2–1	1–1
Liverpool (England)	4–1	(Romania) Unirea Urziceni	1–0	3–1
Hamburger SV (Germany)	3–3 (a)	(Netherlands) PSV Eindhoven	1–0	2–3
Villarreal (Spain)	3–6	(Germany) VfL Wolfsburg	2–2	1–4
Standard Liège (Belgium)	3–2	(Austria) Red Bull Salzburg	3–2	0–0
Twente (Netherlands)	2–4	(Germany) Werder Bremen	1–0	1–4
Lille (France)	3–2	(Turkey) Fenerbahçe	2–1	1–1
Everton (England)	2–4	(Portugal) Sporting CP	2–1	0–3
Hertha BSC (Germany)	1–5	(Portugal) Benfica	1–1	0–4

=== Matches ===
18 February 2010
15:00

Rubin Kazan (Russia)	3–0	(Israel) Hapoel Tel Aviv
Bukharov 14', 23'; Semak 69'	Report

Central Stadium, Kazan
Attendance: 7,152
Referee: William Collum (Scotland)
25 February 2010
21:05

Hapoel Tel Aviv (Israel)	0–0	(Russia) Rubin Kazan
	Report

Bloomfield Stadium, Tel Aviv
Attendance: 12,864
Referee: Pavel Kralovec (Czech Republic)

Rubin Kazan won 3–0 on aggregate.

18 February 2010
21:05

Athletic Bilbao (Spain)	1–1	(Belgium) Anderlecht
San José 58'	Report	Biglia 35'

San Mamés, Bilbao
Attendance: 38,000
Referee: Matteo Trefoloni (Italy)
25 February 2010
19:00

Anderlecht (Belgium)	4–0	(Spain) Athletic Bilbao
Lukaku 4'; San José 27' (o.g.); Juhász 49'; Legear 68'	Report

Constant Vanden Stock Stadium, Brussels
Attendance: 19,858
Referee: Thomas Einwaller (Austria)

Anderlecht won 5–1 on aggregate.

18 February 2010
21:05

Copenhagen (Denmark)	1–3	(France) Marseille
Grønkjær 79' (pen.)	Report	Niang 72'; Ben Arfa 84'; Kaboré 90'

Parken Stadium, Copenhagen
Attendance: 20,334
Referee: Carlos Velasco Carballo (Spain)
25 February 2010
19:00

Marseille (France)	3–1	(Denmark) Copenhagen
Ben Arfa 43'; Koné 62', 78'	Report	Aílton 87'

Stade Vélodrome, Marseille
Attendance: 27,195
Referee: Cüneyt Çakır (Turkey)

Marseille won 6–2 on aggregate.

18 February 2010
21:05

Panathinaikos (Greece)	3–2	(Italy) Roma
Salpingidis 67'; Christodoulopoulos 84'; Cissé 89'	Report	Vučinić 29'; Pizarro 81' (pen.)

Olympic Stadium, Athens
Attendance: 54,274
Referee: Damir Skomina (Slovenia)
25 February 2010
19:00

Roma (Italy)	2–3	(Greece) Panathinaikos
Riise 11'; De Rossi 67'	Report	Cissé 40' (pen.), 45+1'; Ninis 43'

Stadio Olimpico, Rome
Attendance: 47,825
Referee: Bruno Paixão (Portugal)

Panathinaikos won 6–4 on aggregate.

18 February 2010
21:05

Atlético Madrid (Spain)	1–1	(Turkey) Galatasaray
Reyes 23'	Report	Keïta 77'

Vicente Calderón, Madrid
Attendance: 28,056
Referee: Aleksei Nikolaev (Russia)
25 February 2010
19:00

Galatasaray (Turkey)	1–2	(Spain) Atlético Madrid
Keïta 66'	Report	Simão 63'; Forlán 90'

Ali Sami Yen Stadium, Istanbul
Attendance: 22,747
Referee: Gianluca Rocchi (Italy)

Atlético Madrid won 3–2 on aggregate.

18 February 2010
19:00

Ajax (Netherlands)	1–2	(Italy) Juventus
Sulejmani 16'	Report	Amauri 31', 58'

Amsterdam Arena, Amsterdam
Attendance: 51,676
Referee: Ivan Bebek (Croatia)
25 February 2010
21:05

Juventus (Italy)	0–0	(Netherlands) Ajax
	Report

Stadio Olimpico Grande Torino, Turin
Attendance: 16,441
Referee: Laurent Duhamel (France)

Juventus won 2–1 on aggregate.

18 February 2010
19:00

Club Brugge (Belgium)	1–0	(Spain) Valencia
Kouemaha 56'	Report

Jan Breydel Stadium, Bruges
Attendance: 21,657
Referee: Tony Chapron (France)
25 February 2010
21:05

Valencia (Spain)	3–0 (a.e.t.)	(Belgium) Club Brugge
Mata 1'; Hernández 97', 117'	Report

Mestalla, Valencia
Attendance: 45,297
Referee: Claus Bo Larsen (Denmark)

Valencia won 3–1 on aggregate.

18 February 2010
21:05

Fulham (England)	2–1	(Ukraine) Shakhtar Donetsk
Gera 3'; Zamora 63'	Report	Luiz Adriano 32'

Craven Cottage, London
Attendance: 21,832
Referee: Serge Gumienny (Belgium)
25 February 2010
19:00

Shakhtar Donetsk (Ukraine)	1–1	(England) Fulham
Jádson 69'	Report	Hangeland 33'

Donbas Arena, Donetsk
Attendance: 47,509
Referee: Svein Oddvar Moen (Norway)

Fulham won 3–2 on aggregate.

18 February 2010
21:05

Liverpool (England)	1–0	(Romania) Unirea Urziceni
Ngog 81'	Report

Anfield, Liverpool
Attendance: 40,450
Referee: Eric Braamhaar (Netherlands)
25 February 2010
19:00

Unirea Urziceni (Romania)	1–3	(England) Liverpool
Fernandes 19'	Report	Mascherano 30'; Babel 41'; Gerrard 57'

Stadionul Steaua, Bucharest (Note: Unirea Urziceni played their only knockout phase match at Stadionul Steaua in Bucharest as their Stadionul Tineretului did not meet UEFA criteria.)
Attendance: 17,632
Referee: Stefan Johannesson (Sweden)

Liverpool won 4–1 on aggregate.

18 February 2010
21:05

Hamburger SV (Germany)	1–0	(Netherlands) PSV Eindhoven
Jansen 26' (pen.)	Report

Volksparkstadion, Hamburg
Attendance: 35,672
Referee: Claudio Circhetta (Switzerland)
25 February 2010
19:00

PSV Eindhoven (Netherlands)	3–2	(Germany) Hamburger SV
Toivonen 2'; Dzsudzsák 43'; Koevermans 90'	Report	Petrić 46'; Trochowski 79' (pen.)

Philips Stadion, Eindhoven
Attendance: 30,500
Referee: Mike Dean (England)

3–3 on aggregate; Hamburger SV won on away goals.

18 February 2010
19:00

Villarreal (Spain)	2–2	(Germany) VfL Wolfsburg
Senna 43'; Ruben 85'	Report	Grafite 65', 84' (pen.)

El Madrigal, Villarreal
Attendance: 11,384
Referee: Kevin Blom (Netherlands)
25 February 2010
21:05

VfL Wolfsburg (Germany)	4–1	(Spain) Villarreal
Džeko 10'; Ángel 15' (o.g.); Gentner 42'; Grafite 64'	Report	Capdevila 30'

Volkswagen Arena, Wolfsburg
Attendance: 16,613
Referee: Alexandru Tudor (Romania)

VfL Wolfsburg won 6–3 on aggregate.

18 February 2010
19:00

Standard Liège (Belgium)	3–2	(Austria) Red Bull Salzburg
Witsel 66' (pen.), 82'; De Camargo 80'	Report	Janko 4', 45'

Stade Maurice Dufrasne, Liège
Attendance: 20,168
Referee: Cristian Balaj (Romania)
25 February 2010
21:05

Red Bull Salzburg (Austria)	0–0	(Belgium) Standard Liège
	Report

Red Bull Arena, Salzburg
Attendance: 26,500
Referee: Alan Kelly (Republic of Ireland)

Standard Liège won 3–2 on aggregate.

18 February 2010
19:00

Twente (Netherlands)	1–0	(Germany) Werder Bremen
Janssen 38'	Report

De Grolsch Veste, Enschede
Attendance: 22,000
Referee: Lucílio Batista (Portugal)
25 February 2010
21:05

Werder Bremen (Germany)	4–1	(Netherlands) Twente
Pizarro 15', 20', 58'; Naldo 27'	Report	De Jong 33'

Weserstadion, Bremen
Attendance: 20,963
Referee: Kristinn Jakobsson (Iceland)

Werder Bremen won 4–2 on aggregate.

18 February 2010
19:00

Lille (France)	2–1	(Turkey) Fenerbahçe
Balmont 3'; Frau 52'	Report	Gökçek Vederson 5'

Stadium Lille Métropole, Villeneuve-d'Ascq
Attendance: 16,783
Referee: Eduardo Iturralde González (Spain)
25 February 2010
21:05

Fenerbahçe (Turkey)	1–1	(France) Lille
Belözoğlu 35'	Report	Rami 85'

Şükrü Saracoğlu Stadium, Istanbul
Attendance: 38,740
Referee: Florian Meyer (Germany)

Lille won 3–2 on aggregate.

16 February 2010
18:45

Everton (England)	2–1	(Portugal) Sporting CP
Pienaar 35'; Distin 49'	Report	Veloso 87' (pen.)

Goodison Park, Liverpool
Attendance: 28,131
Referee: Darko Čeferin (Slovenia)
25 February 2010
21:05

Sporting CP (Portugal)	3–0	(England) Everton
Veloso 64'; Mendes 76'; Fernández 90+4'	Report

Estádio José Alvalade, Lisbon
Attendance: 17,609
Referee: Alon Yefet (Israel)

Sporting CP won 4–2 on aggregate.

18 February 2010
21:05

Hertha BSC (Germany)	1–1	(Portugal) Benfica
García 33' (o.g.)	Report	Di María 4'

Olympic Stadium, Berlin
Attendance: 13,684
Referee: Terje Hauge (Norway)
23 February 2010
18:00

Benfica (Portugal)	4–0	(Germany) Hertha BSC
Aimar 25'; Cardozo 48', 62'; García 59'	Report

Estádio da Luz, Lisbon
Attendance: 30,402
Referee: Pieter Vink (Netherlands)

Benfica won 5–1 on aggregate.

== Round of 16 ==
The draw for the round of 16 took place on 18 December 2009, immediately after the round of 32 draw.

=== Summary ===
The first legs were played on 11 March, and the second legs were played on 18 March 2010.

Team 1	Agg.	Team 2	1st leg	2nd leg
Hamburger SV (Germany)	6–5	(Belgium) Anderlecht	3–1	3–4
Rubin Kazan (Russia)	2–3	(Germany) VfL Wolfsburg	1–1	1–2 (a.e.t.)
Atlético Madrid (Spain)	2–2 (a)	(Portugal) Sporting CP	0–0	2–2
Benfica (Portugal)	3–2	(France) Marseille	1–1	2–1
Panathinaikos (Greece)	1–4	(Belgium) Standard Liège	1–3	0–1
Lille (France)	1–3	(England) Liverpool	1–0	0–3
Juventus (Italy)	4–5	(England) Fulham	3–1	1–4
Valencia (Spain)	5–5 (a)	(Germany) Werder Bremen	1–1	4–4

=== Matches ===
11 March 2010
19:00

Hamburger SV (Germany)	3–1	(Belgium) Anderlecht
Mathijsen 23'; Van Nistelrooy 40'; Jarolím 76'	Report	Legear 45'

Volksparkstadion, Hamburg
Attendance: 34,921
Referee: Laurent Duhamel (France)
18 March 2010
21:05

Anderlecht (Belgium)	4–3	(Germany) Hamburger SV
Lukaku 44'; Suárez 45+3' (pen.); Biglia 59'; Boussoufa 66'	Report	Boateng 42'; Jansen 54'; Petrić 75'

Constant Vanden Stock Stadium, Brussels
Attendance: 19,669
Referee: Terje Hauge (Norway)

Hamburger SV won 6–5 on aggregate.

11 March 2010
19:00

Rubin Kazan (Russia)	1–1	(Germany) VfL Wolfsburg
Noboa 29'	Report	Misimović 67'

Central Stadium, Kazan
Attendance: 8,432
Referee: Pedro Proença (Portugal)
18 March 2010
21:05

VfL Wolfsburg (Germany)	2–1 (a.e.t.)	(Russia) Rubin Kazan
Martins 58'; Gentner 119'	Report	Kasaev 21'

Volkswagen Arena, Wolfsburg
Attendance: 15,412
Referee: Jonas Eriksson (Sweden)

VfL Wolfsburg won 3–2 on aggregate.

11 March 2010
19:00

Atlético Madrid (Spain)	0–0	(Portugal) Sporting CP
	Report

Vicente Calderón, Madrid
Attendance: 34,540
Referee: Pieter Vink (Netherlands)
18 March 2010
21:05

Sporting CP (Portugal)	2–2	(Spain) Atlético Madrid
Liédson 19'; Polga 45+1'	Report	Agüero 3', 33'

Estádio José Alvalade, Lisbon
Attendance: 41,919
Referee: Knut Kircher (Germany)

2–2 on aggregate; Atlético Madrid won on away goals.

11 March 2010
21:05

Benfica (Portugal)	1–1	(France) Marseille
Pereira 76'	Report	Ben Arfa 90'

Estádio da Luz, Lisbon
Attendance: 46,635
Referee: Felix Brych (Germany)
18 March 2010
19:00

Marseille (France)	1–2	(Portugal) Benfica
Niang 70'	Report	Pereira 75'; Alan Kardec 90+1'

Stade Vélodrome, Marseille
Attendance: 38,386
Referee: Damir Skomina (Slovenia)

Benfica won 3–2 on aggregate.

11 March 2010
21:05

Panathinaikos (Greece)	1–3	(Belgium) Standard Liège
Vyntra 48'	Report	Witsel 8'; Jovanović 16'; De Camargo 74'

Olympic Stadium, Athens
Attendance: 50,782
Referee: Craig Thomson (Scotland)
18 March 2010
19:00

Standard Liège (Belgium)	1–0	(Greece) Panathinaikos
Mbokani 45+2'	Report

Stade Maurice Dufrasne, Liège
Attendance: 26,471
Referee: Gianluca Rocchi (Italy)

Standard Liège won 4–1 on aggregate.

11 March 2010
19:00

Lille (France)	1–0	(England) Liverpool
Hazard 84'	Report

Stadium Lille Métropole, Villeneuve-d'Ascq
Attendance: 17,931
Referee: Claus Bo Larsen (Denmark)
18 March 2010
21:05

Liverpool (England)	3–0	(France) Lille
Gerrard 9' (pen.); Torres 49', 89'	Report

Anfield, Liverpool
Attendance: 38,139
Referee: Nicola Rizzoli (Italy)

Liverpool won 3–1 on aggregate.

11 March 2010
21:05

Juventus (Italy)	3–1	(England) Fulham
Legrottaglie 9'; Zebina 25'; Salihamidžić 45+3'	Report	Etuhu 36'

Stadio Olimpico Grande Torino, Turin
Attendance: 11,406
Referee: Florian Meyer (Germany)
18 March 2010
19:00

Fulham (England)	4–1	(Italy) Juventus
Zamora 9'; Gera 39', 49' (pen.); Dempsey 82'	Report	Trezeguet 2'

Craven Cottage, London
Attendance: 23,458
Referee: Björn Kuipers (Netherlands)

Fulham won 5–4 on aggregate.

11 March 2010
21:05

Valencia (Spain)	1–1	(Germany) Werder Bremen
Mata 57'	Report	Frings 24' (pen.)

Mestalla, Valencia
Attendance: 37,223
Referee: Martin Atkinson (England)
18 March 2010
19:00

Werder Bremen (Germany)	4–4	(Spain) Valencia
Almeida 26'; Frings 57' (pen.); Marin 62'; Pizarro 84'	Report	Villa 2', 45', 65'; Mata 15'

Weserstadion, Bremen
Attendance: 24,200
Referee: Kevin Blom (Netherlands)

5–5 on aggregate; Valencia won on away goals.

== Quarter-finals ==
The draw for the quarter-finals was held on 19 March 2010.

=== Summary ===
The first legs were played on 1 April, and the second legs were played on 8 April 2010.

Team 1	Agg.	Team 2	1st leg	2nd leg
Fulham (England)	3–1	(Germany) VfL Wolfsburg	2–1	1–0
Hamburger SV (Germany)	5–2	(Belgium) Standard Liège	2–1	3–1
Valencia (Spain)	2–2 (a)	(Spain) Atlético Madrid	2–2	0–0
Benfica (Portugal)	3–5	(England) Liverpool	2–1	1–4

=== Matches ===
1 April 2010
21:05

Fulham (England)	2–1	(Germany) VfL Wolfsburg
Zamora 59'; Duff 63'	Report	Madlung 89'

Craven Cottage, London
Attendance: 22,301
Referee: Damir Skomina (Slovenia)
8 April 2010
21:05

VfL Wolfsburg (Germany)	0–1	(England) Fulham
	Report	Zamora 1'

Volkswagen Arena, Wolfsburg
Attendance: 24,843
Referee: Viktor Kassai (Hungary)

Fulham won 3–1 on aggregate.

1 April 2010
21:05

Hamburger SV (Germany)	2–1	(Belgium) Standard Liège
Petrić 42' (pen.); Van Nistelrooy 45'	Report	Mbokani 31'

Volksparkstadion, Hamburg
Attendance: 48,437
Referee: Martin Atkinson (England)
8 April 2010
21:05

Standard Liège (Belgium)	1–3	(Germany) Hamburger SV
De Camargo 33'	Report	Petrić 20', 35'; Guerrero 90+4'

Stade Maurice Dufrasne, Liège
Attendance: 27,129
Referee: Pedro Proença (Portugal)

Hamburger SV won 5–2 on aggregate.

1 April 2010
21:05

Valencia (Spain)	2–2	(Spain) Atlético Madrid
Fernandes 66'; Villa 82'	Report	Forlán 59'; López 72'

Mestalla, Valencia
Attendance: 46,310
Referee: Craig Thomson (Scotland)
8 April 2010
21:05

Atlético Madrid (Spain)	0–0	(Spain) Valencia
	Report

Vicente Calderón, Madrid
Attendance: 49,907
Referee: Florian Meyer (Germany)

2–2 on aggregate; Atlético Madrid won on away goals.

1 April 2010
21:05

Benfica (Portugal)	2–1	(England) Liverpool
Cardozo 59' (pen.), 79' (pen.)	Report	Agger 9'

Estádio da Luz, Lisbon
Attendance: 62,629
Referee: Jonas Eriksson (Sweden)
8 April 2010
21:05

Liverpool (England)	4–1	(Portugal) Benfica
Kuyt 27'; Lucas 34'; Torres 59', 82'	Report	Cardozo 70'

Anfield, Liverpool
Attendance: 42,377
Referee: Björn Kuipers (Netherlands)

Liverpool won 5–3 on aggregate.

== Semi-finals ==
The draw for the semi-finals was held on 19 March 2010, immediately after the quarter-final draw.

=== Summary ===
The first legs were played on 22 April, and the second legs were played on 29 April 2010. As a result of the disruption to air travel as a result of the eruptions of the Icelandic volcano Eyjafjallajökull, both English sides were forced to abandon their plans to fly for the first legs of their ties; Fulham undertook a coach journey from London to Hamburg, while Liverpool travelled by train to Paris, then subsequently by coach to Bordeaux before flying to Madrid.

Team 1	Agg.	Team 2	1st leg	2nd leg
Hamburger SV (Germany)	1–2	(England) Fulham	0–0	1–2
Atlético Madrid (Spain)	2–2 (a)	(England) Liverpool	1–0	1–2 (a.e.t.)

=== Matches ===
22 April 2010
21:05

Hamburger SV (Germany)	0–0	(England) Fulham
	Report

Volksparkstadion, Hamburg
Attendance: 49,171
Referee: Claus Bo Larsen (Denmark)
29 April 2010
21:05

Fulham (England)	2–1	(Germany) Hamburger SV
Davies 69'; Gera 76'	Report	Petrić 22'

Craven Cottage, London
Attendance: 23,705
Referee: Cüneyt Çakır (Turkey)

Fulham won 2–1 on aggregate.

22 April 2010
21:05

Atlético Madrid (Spain)	1–0	(England) Liverpool
Forlán 9'	Report

Vicente Calderón, Madrid
Attendance: 47,042
Referee: Laurent Duhamel (France)
29 April 2010
21:05

Liverpool (England)	2–1 (a.e.t.)	(Spain) Atlético Madrid
Aquilani 44'; Benayoun 95'	Report	Forlán 102'

Anfield, Liverpool
Attendance: 42,040
Referee: Terje Hauge (Norway)

2–2 on aggregate; Atlético Madrid won on away goals.

== Final ==
The final took place on 12 May 2010 at the Volksparkstadion in Hamburg, Germany. A draw was held on 19 March 2010, after the quarter-final and semi-final draws, to determine the "home" team for administrative purposes.

12 May 2010
20:45

Atlético Madrid (Spain)	2–1 (a.e.t.)	(England) Fulham
Forlán 32', 116'	Report	Davies 37'

Volksparkstadion, Hamburg
Attendance: 49,000
Referee: Nicola Rizzoli (Italy)
