= Paul Allaerts =

Belgian former football referee

- Born: 9 July 1964 (age 62); Mol, Belgium
- Other occupation: Sports Director RBFA

Domestic
Years	League	Role
1996–2009	Belgian First Division	Referee

International
Years	League	Role
2000–2009	UEFA	Referee
2000–2009	FIFA	Referee

Paul Allaerts (born 9 July 1964 in Mol, Belgium) is a Belgian former football referee. Outside sport Allaerts works as an IT manager.

Allaerts began refereeing in 1985 and took charge of his first Belgian First Division game in 1996. He is one of only two Belgian UEFA-certified referees, along with Frank De Bleeckere, meaning that he is able to referee matches in the UEFA Champions League, UEFA Cup and UEFA European Championship. Allaerts was also voted Belgian Referee of the Year in 2004-05 and 2005–06. He was named the referee for the first Group B game of the 2008–09 UEFA Cup season between Hertha Berlin and Benfica in Germany, on 23 October 2008, along with Danny Huens and Joel De Bruyn as his linesmen, and Jean-Baptist Bultynck as the 4th referee.

In the 2008–09 season he refereed 18 games in the Belgian First Division. In total he showed 79 yellow cards and 4 red cards and awarded eight penalties. During the season, he refereed four games between Anderlecht and Standard Liège: 1 time for the Belgian Super Cup, 2 times in the first division and 1 duel of the test games (appointing the Belgian Champion). Furthermore, in 2008-2009 he refereed one game in the Champions league between FC Basel and Sporting Clube de Portugal.
