= Thomas Einwaller =

Austrian football referee

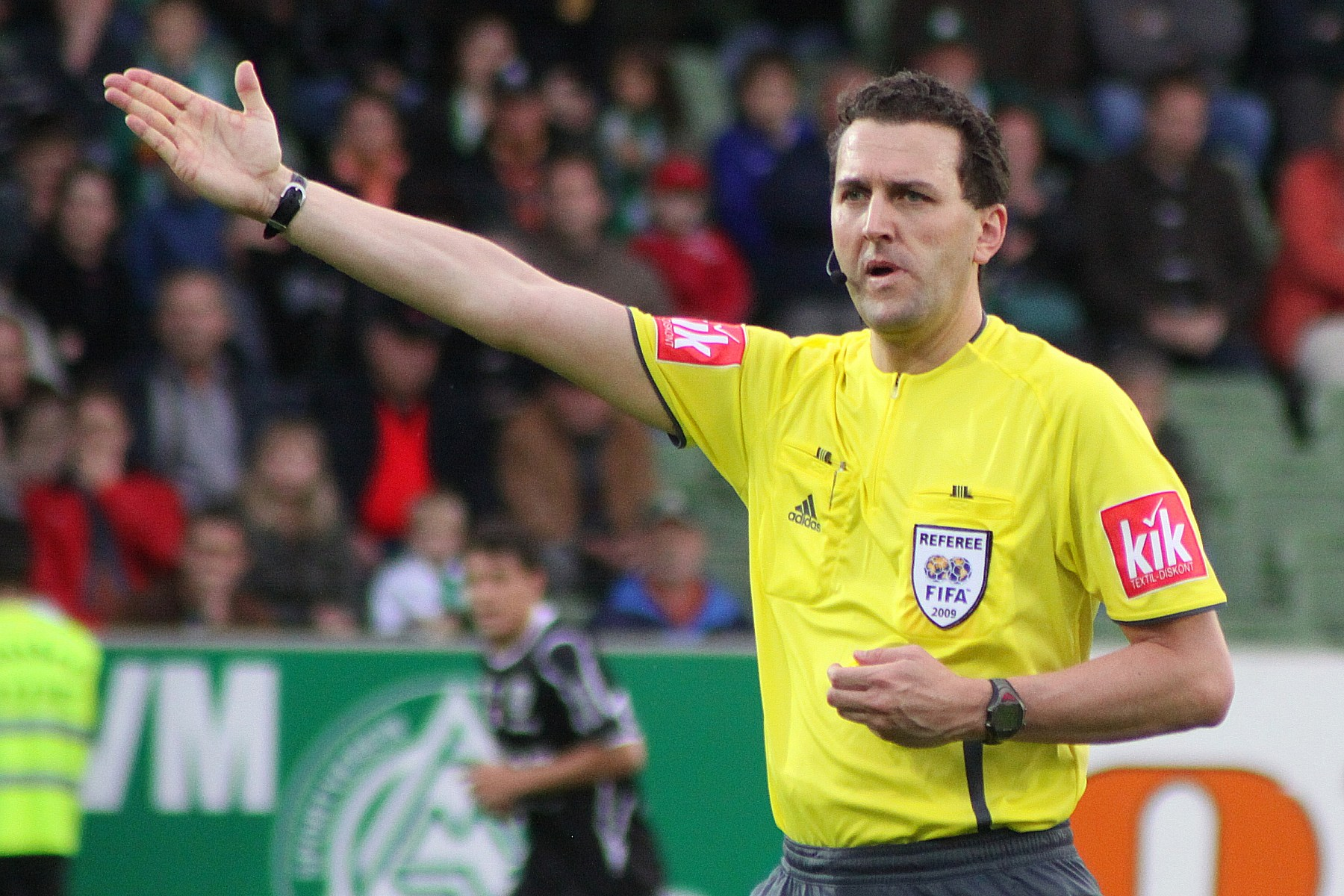
FIFA-referee Thomas Einwaller in 2009

Thomas Einwaller (born 25 April 1977) is an Austrian football referee. He has been a FIFA international referee since 2005. He lives in Scheffau am Wilden Kaiser and works as a bank clerk. He has refereed games at the 2008 Olympics (including a bronze medal game), UEFA Champions League, UEFA Cup and qualifiers for the UEFA Euro 2008 and 2010 FIFA World Cup.

He was preselected as a referee for the 2010 FIFA World Cup.
