= 2009–10 FC Slovan Liberec season =

Slovan Liberec
2009–10 season
- Manager: Ladislav Škorpil (until 7 November 2009); Josef Petřík (from 7 November)
- Stadium: Stadion u Nisy
- Czech First League: 9th
- Czech Cup: Quarter-finals
- UEFA Europa League: Play-off round
- Top goalscorer: League: Bořek Dočkal; Andrej Kerić (5 each)
- Average home league attendance: 4,384
- Biggest win: 7–2 v Dvůr Králové (Away, 16 September 2009, Czech Cup)
- Biggest defeat: 0–4 v Sigma Olomouc (Home, 7 November 2009, Czech First League)

The 2009–10 season was Football Club Slovan Liberec's 17th consecutive season in the Czech First League. In addition to the domestic league, Slovan Liberec participated in that season's editions of the Czech Cup and the UEFA Europa League.

== Squad ==
Squad at end of season

Note: Flags indicate national team as defined under FIFA eligibility rules; some limited exceptions apply. Players may hold more than one non-FIFA nationality.

No.	Pos.	Nation	Player
1	GK	CZE	Zbyněk Hauzr
2	DF	CRO	Renato Kelić
3	FW	CZE	Jakub Vojta
5	MF	CZE	Michal Zeman
6	MF	CZE	Lukáš Vácha
7	FW	CZE	Jan Nezmar
8	MF	CZE	Jiří Liška
9	FW	CZE	Ondřej Smetana
10	MF	CZE	Marcel Gecov
11	DF	CZE	Miroslav Holeňák
12	MF	SRB	Miloš Bosančić
13	DF	CZE	Jan Polák

No.	Pos.	Nation	Player
14	FW	CZE	Jaroslav Diviš
15	FW	CRO	Andrej Kerić
16	DF	CZE	Daniel Rehák
17	DF	CZE	Tomáš Janů
18	FW	CZE	Bořek Dočkal
19	DF	CRO	Lovre Vulin
20	MF	CZE	Tomáš Frejlach
21	DF	CZE	Radek Dejmek
22	MF	BIH	Josip Ćorić
23	MF	CZE	Petr Papoušek
31	GK	CZE	Lukáš Zich
32	DF	CZE	Theodor Gebre Selassie

== Competitions ==
=== Overview ===
Competition	First match	Last match	Starting round	Final position	Record							
Competition	First match	Last match	Starting round	Final position	Pld	W	D	L	GF	GA	GD	Win %
Czech First League	25 July 2009	15 May 2010	Matchday 1	9th	30	10	7	13	34	39	−5	33.33
Czech Cup	16 September 2009	7 April 2010	Second round	Quarter-finals	6	2	2	2	11	8	+3	33.33
UEFA Europa League	30 July 2009	27 August 2009	Third qualifying round	Play-off round	4	3	0	1	6	3	+3	75.00
Total					40	15	9	16	51	50	+1	37.50

Source: Competitions

=== Czech First League ===
==== League table ====
Pos	Team	Pld	W	D	L	GF	GA	GD	Pts
7	Slavia Prague	30	11	8	11	37	35	+2	41
8	Mladá Boleslav	30	11	6	13	47	41	+6	39
9	Slovan Liberec	30	10	7	13	34	39	−5	37
10	Příbram	30	10	6	14	35	41	−6	36
11	Brno	30	9	8	13	31	40	−9	35

Source: Fortuna liga
Rules for classification: 1) points; 2) goal difference; 3) number of goals scored.

==== Results summary ====
Overall								Home						Away					
Pld	W	D	L	GF	GA	GD	Pts	W	D	L	GF	GA	GD	W	D	L	GF	GA	GD
30	10	7	13	34	39	−5	37	6	4	5	21	18	+3	4	3	8	13	21	−8

Source: Competitions

==== Results by round ====
Round	1	2	3	4	5	6	7	8	9	10	11	12	13	14	15	16	17	18	19	20	21	22	23	24	25	26	27	28	29	30
Ground	H	A	H	A	H	A	H	A	H	A	A	H	A	H	A	H	A	H	A	H	A	H	A	H	H	A	H	A	H	A
Result	D	L	L	W	W	L	D	L	W	L	L	W	W	L	L	W	L	L	D	L	W	W	D	W	L	D	D	L	D	W
Position	5	14	14	12	8	10	11	11	10	11	11	9	8	11	11	10	10	12	11	12	11	11	10	10	10	10	9	10	11	9
Points	1	1	1	4	7	7	8	8	11	11	11	14	17	17	17	20	20	20	21	21	24	27	28	31	31	32	33	33	34	37

Source: Matches
A = Away; H = Home; W = Win; D = Draw; L = Loss

==== Matches ====
25 July 2009 1	Slovan Liberec	1–1	Kladno	Liberec
	Vácha (yellow card) 36'; Gecov 62'; Ćorić (yellow card) 73'	Report	Moravec (yellow card) 41'; Szabo (yellow card) 42', (goal) 53'; Pavlík (yellow card) 44'; Strnad (yellow card) 61'; Procházka (yellow card) 75'	Stadium: Stadion u Nisy; Attendance: 4,026; Referee: Tomáš Kocourek; Assistant referees: Josef Košec, Ivan Teuber

2 August 2009 2	Mladá Boleslav	4–1	Slovan Liberec	Mladá Boleslav
	Đalović (yellow card) 6'; Pecka 19', 20'; Kulič 36'; Procházka 40'; Sylvestre (yellow card) 42'	Report	Nezmar 43', (yellow card) 53'; Dočkal (yellow card) 48'; Dejmek (yellow card) 63'	Stadium: Městský stadion Attendance: 4,820; Referee: Drahoslav Drábek; Assistant referees: Ivo Chytil, Petr Vysloužil

9 August 2009 3	Slovan Liberec	0–1	Brno	Liberec
	Nezmar (yellow card) 83'	Report	Rabušic 35'; Lira (yellow card) 55'; Jílek (yellow card) 88'	Stadium: Stadion u Nisy; Attendance: 4,872; Referee: Jiří Adam; Assistant referees: Jaroslav Moudrý, Michal Urban

16 August 2009 4	Viktoria Plzeň	2–3	Slovan Liberec	Plzeň
	Petržela (yellow card) 11'; Kolář (yellow card) 40'; Bakoš 70'; Bystroň (yellow card) 78'; Horváth 90' (pen.)	Report	Holeňák (yellow card) 19'; Ćorić 22', 53'; Dočkal (yellow card) 39'; Gebre Selassie (yellow card) 69'; Blažek 78'	Stadium: Stadion města Plzně; Attendance: 4,750; Referee: Jan Jílek; Assistant referees: Petr Hojsík, Libor Kovařík

23 August 2009 5	Slovan Liberec	3–0	Dynamo České Budějovice	Liberec
	Vácha 12'; Dočkal 31'; Nezmar 38'; Vulin (yellow card) 61'	Report	Homoláč (yellow card) 23'	Stadium: Stadion u Nisy; Attendance: 4,935; Referee: Pavel Franěk; Assistant referees: Petr Slavík, Petr Čecháček

30 August 2009 6	Bohemians Prague (Střížkov)	2–1	Slovan Liberec	Prague
	Kincl 24', (yellow card) 76' (red card) 90'; Halama (yellow card) 42'; Zoubek 49'; Macháček (yellow card) 70'	Report	Blažek 18'; Vácha (yellow card) 30'; Liška (yellow card) 78'	Stadium: Stadion Evžena Rošického; Attendance: 750; Referee: Radek Příhoda; Assistant referees: Antonín Kordula, Ladislav Gallo

12 September 2009 7	Slovan Liberec	1–1	Slavia Prague	Liberec
	Gebre Selassie 18'; Liška (yellow card) 29'; Dočkal (yellow card) 48'; Dejmek (yellow card) 69'	Report	Belaïd 10'; Vasiljević (yellow card) 67'	Stadium: Stadion u Nisy; Attendance: 6,031; Referee: Pavel Královec; Assistant referees: Miroslav Zlámal, Luděk Lhoták

19 September 2009 8	Jablonec	2–1	Slovan Liberec	Jablonec nad Nisou
	Zábojník 16'; Huber (yellow card) 23'; Lafata 63'	Report	Liška (yellow card) 20'; Bosančić 39'	Stadium: Stadion Střelnice; Attendance: 5,712; Referee: Drahoslav Drábek; Assistant referees: Libor Novák, Drahoslav Handlíř

26 September 2009 9	Slovan Liberec	2–0	Slovácko	Liberec
	Gebre Selassie 16'; Blažek 50'	Report	Struhár (yellow card) 52'; Perůtka (yellow card) 78'; Ondřejka (yellow card) 86'	Stadium: Stadion u Nisy; Attendance: 3,732; Referee: Jiří Adam; Assistant referees: Pavel Peřina, Gustav Santarius

3 October 2009 10	Teplice	2–0	Slovan Liberec	Teplice
	Vidlička 9'; Mahmutović 45'; Klein (yellow card) 45'; Lukáš (yellow card) 67'	Report	Bosančić (yellow card) 23'; Papoušek (yellow card) 87'	Stadium: Na Stínadlech; Attendance: 3,056; Referee: Libor Kovařík; Assistant referees: Josef Košec, Jaroslav Moudrý

17 October 2009 11	Baník Ostrava	1–0	Slovan Liberec	Ostrava
	Mičola 55'; Nando (yellow card) 90'	Report	Gecov (yellow card) 78'; Bosančić (yellow card) 90'	Stadium: Bazaly; Attendance: 3,200; Referee: Jan Jílek; Assistant referees: Martin Večeřa, Dušan Pospíšil

24 October 2009 12	Slovan Liberec	1–0	Příbram	Liberec
	Kelić 39'; Gecov (yellow card) 50'	Report	Rodrigues (yellow card) 36'; Šmejkal (yellow card) 56'	Stadium: Stadion u Nisy; Attendance: 2,447; Referee: Tomáš Kocourek; Assistant referees: Petr Hojsík, Ladislav Gallo

1 November 2009 13	Bohemians 1905	0–1	Slovan Liberec	Prague
	Škoda (yellow card) 55'	Report	Bosančić (yellow card) 43'; Blažek 69'	Stadium: Ďolíček; Attendance: 5,847; Referee: Pavel Franěk; Assistant referees: Zdeněk Dobrovolný, Ondřej Pelikán

7 November 2009 14	Slovan Liberec	0–4	Sigma Olomouc	Liberec
		Report	Ordoš 29'; Šultes 32', 60'; Rossi 53'	Stadium: Stadion u Nisy; Attendance: 2,617; Referee: Jiří Jech; Assistant referees: Drahoslav Handlíř, Václav Štěrba

21 November 2009 15	Sparta Prague	2–0	Slovan Liberec	Prague
	Holenda 23'; Bony (yellow card) 26'; Zeman (yellow card) 52'; Kadlec 68'	Report	Kelić (red card) 8'; Papoušek (yellow card) 9'; Blažek (yellow card) 27'; Dočkal (yellow card) 35'; Vácha (yellow card) 53'; Liška (yellow card) 86'	Stadium: Generali Arena; Attendance: 9,209; Referee: Tomáš Kocourek; Assistant referees: Patrik Filípek, Robert Kubáň

28 November 2009 16	Slovan Liberec	3–0	Mladá Boleslav	Liberec
	Nezmar 22'; Kerić 64'; Vácha (yellow card) 68' (red card) 73'; Bosančić 71'; Holeňák (yellow card) 88'	Report	Rajnoch (yellow card) 29'; Mendy (yellow card) 47'; Rolko (yellow card) 71' (red card) 90'	Stadium: Stadion u Nisy; Attendance: 3,929; Referee: Tomáš Adámek; Assistant referees: Martin Wilczek, Petr Vysloužil

27 February 2010 17	Brno	1–0	Slovan Liberec	Brno
	Polách 44'	Report	Dejmek (yellow card) 71'; Smetana (yellow card) 82'	Stadium: Městský fotbalový stadion Srbská; Attendance: 2,481; Referee: Libor Kovařík; Assistant referees: Antonín Kordula, Zdeněk Koval

6 March 2010 18	Slovan Liberec	0–2	Viktoria Plzeň	Liberec
		Report	Rezek (yellow card) 7', (goal) 33'; Jiráček (yellow card) 75'; Daněk (yellow card) 83'; Kolář 86'	Stadium: Stadion u Nisy; Attendance: 3,058; Referee: Tomáš Kocourek; Assistant referees: Martin Wilczek, Gustav Santarius

14 March 2010 19	Dynamo České Budějovice	1–1	Slovan Liberec	České Budějovice
	Otepka 77'; Hunal (yellow card) 90'	Report	Vulin 68', (yellow card) 68'	Stadium: Stadion Střelecký ostrov Attendance: 2.557; Referee: Dagmar Damková; Assistant referees: Kryštof Mencl, Josef Košec

20 March 2010 20	Slovan Liberec	2–3	Bohemians Prague (Střížkov)	Liberec
	Vulin 6'; Kerić 58', (yellow card) 63'; Kelić (yellow card) 61'; Dočkal (yellow card) 77'	Report	Fenyk 12', (yellow card) 58'; Demeter (yellow card) 39'; Dobeš 53'; Jeslínek 70'	Stadium: Stadion u Nisy; Attendance: 3,920; Referee: Pavel Franěk; Assistant referees: Petr Čecháček, Pavel Peřina

25 March 2010 21	Slavia Prague	0–2	Slovan Liberec	Prague
		Report	Kerić 19', (yellow card) 75'; Vulin 25'; Zeman (yellow card) 42'; Frejlach (yellow card) 59'; Zich (yellow card) 87'	Stadium: Synot Tip Arena; Attendance: 7,418; Referee: Drahoslav Drábek; Assistant referees: Luděk Lhoták, Tomáš Lakomý

28 March 2010 22	Slovan Liberec	4–2	Jablonec	Liberec
	Nezmar 7'; Dočkal 21'; Kerić (yellow card) 23', (goal) 37'; Zábojník 46' (o.g.); Liška (yellow card) 90'	Report	Lafata 15', 38', (yellow card) 25'; Pekhart (yellow card) 29'; Jablonský (yellow card) 81'	Stadium: Stadion u Nisy; Attendance: 5,967; Referee: Miroslav Zelinka; Assistant referees: Martin Večeřa, Ladislav Gallo

3 April 2010 23	Slovácko	0–0	Slovan Liberec	Uherské Hradiště
	Nestorovski (yellow card) 32'; Košút (yellow card) 42'; Abrahám (yellow card) 85'	Report	Dočkal (yellow card) 8'; Dejmek (yellow card) 13'; Gecov (yellow card) 32'; Smetana (yellow card) 42'; Kelić (yellow card) 50'; Nezmar (yellow card) 64'	Stadium: Městský fotbalový stadion Miroslava Valenty; Attendance: 5,220; Referee: Radek Matějek; Assistant referees: Kryštof Mencl, Zdeněk Koval

11 April 2010 24	Slovan Liberec	1–0	Teplice	Liberec
	Dočkal 44' (pen.); Vácha (yellow card) 53'; Papoušek (yellow card) 54'; Holeňák (yellow card) 87'; Vojta (yellow card) 90'	Report	Stožický (yellow card) 42'; Lukáš (yellow card) 43'; Rosa (yellow card) 90'	Stadium: Stadion u Nisy; Attendance: 3,728; Referee: Petr Mikel; Assistant referees: Petr Slavík, Roman Tacina

19 April 2010 25	Slovan Liberec	0–1	Baník Ostrava	Liberec
	Gecov (yellow card) 30'; Kerić (yellow card) 39'; Nezmar (yellow card) 68'; Polák (yellow card) 76'	Report	Nando 69'; Lukeš (yellow card) 76'; Vydra (yellow card) 78'	Stadium: Stadion u Nisy; Attendance: 4,810; Referee: Drahoslav Drábek; Assistant referees: Patrik Filípek, Zdeněk Dobrovolný

24 April 2010 26	Příbram	1–1	Slovan Liberec	Příbram
	Klesa (yellow card) 19'; Nohýnek (yellow card) 75'; Huňa 80'	Report	Dočkal 12'; Holeňák (yellow card) 60'; Vulin (yellow card) 65'	Stadium: Na Litavce; Attendance: 2,478; Referee: Robert Hájek; Assistant referees: Petr Hojsík, Ladislav Gallo

1 May 2010 27	Slovan Liberec	1–1	Bohemians 1905	Liberec
	Nezmar (yellow card) 66'; Kelić 77'; Vulin (yellow card) 87'	Report	Moravec (yellow card) 41'; Bálek 58'; Sňozík (yellow card) 90'	Stadium: Stadion u Nisy; Attendance: 4,058; Referee: Jiří Adam; Assistant referees: Václav Štěrba, Jaroslav Moudrý

5 May 2010 28	Sigma Olomouc	2–0	Slovan Liberec	Olomouc
	Hubník 17'; Ordoš 43' (pen.)	Report	Liška (yellow card) 68'	Stadium: Andrův stadion Attendance: 3,013; Referee: Tomáš Adámek; Assistant referees: Martin Večeřa, Jiří Jiřík

8 May 2010 29	Slovan Liberec	2–2	Sparta Prague	Liberec
	Vulin 8', (yellow card) 8'; Papoušek 76'; Bosančić (yellow card) 77'	Report	Kušnír (yellow card) 10'; Kucka 14', 77'	Stadium: Stadion u Nisy; Attendance: 7,625; Referee: Pavel Královec; Assistant referees: Patrik Filípek, Petr Hojsík

15 May 2010 30	Kladno	1–2	Slovan Liberec	Kladno
	Gross 54'; Svoboda (yellow card) 76'	Report	Dočkal 55' (pen.); Kerić 81'; Zeman (yellow card) 83'	Stadium: Stadion Františka Kloze; Attendance: 720; Referee: Jan Jílek; Assistant referees: Emil Ubias, Michal Urban

=== Czech Cup ===
16 September 2009 Second round	Dvůr Králové	2–7	Slovan Liberec	Dvůr Králové nad Labem
		Report		Stadium: Stadion Pod Hankovym domem

22 September 2009 Third round	Zlín	1–1 (1–3 p)	Slovan Liberec	Zlín
		Report		Stadium: Letná Stadion

==== Fourth round ====
7 October 2009 First leg	Bohemians 1905	1–2	Slovan Liberec	Prague
		Report		Stadium: Ďolíček

28 October 2009 Second leg	Slovan Liberec	1–1 (3–2 agg.)	Bohemians 1905	Liberec
		Report		Stadium: Stadion u Nisy
Note: Slovan Liberec won 3–2 on aggregate.

==== Quarter-finals ====
31 March 2010 First leg	Slovan Liberec	0–2	Sigma Olomouc	Liberec
	Kelić (yellow card) 34'; Papoušek (yellow card) 65'; Dočkal (yellow card) 73'	Report	Kaščák (yellow card) 25'; Šultes 30', 36'; Komárek (yellow card) 68'	Stadium: Stadion u Nisy

7 April 2010 Second leg	Sigma Olomouc	1–0 (3–0 agg.)	Slovan Liberec	Olomouc
	Komárek 21'; Kaščák (yellow card) 31'	Report	Papoušek (yellow card) 42'; Polák (yellow card) 64'; Nezmar (yellow card) 65'; Dočkal (yellow card) 68'	Stadium: Andrův stadion
Note: Sigma Olomouc won 3–0 on aggregate.

=== UEFA Europa League ===
==== Qualifying rounds ====
===== Third qualifying round =====
30 July 2009 First leg	Vaduz (Liechtenstein)	0–1	(Czech Republic) Slovan Liberec	Vaduz, Liechtenstein
19:30 CEST (UTC+2)	Koitka (yellow card) 5'; Burgmeier (yellow card) 28'; Stegmayer (yellow card) 64'; Noll (yellow card) 70'; Ritzberger (yellow card) 90+3'	Report	Blažek 43', (yellow card) 72'; Ćorić (yellow card) 65'; Kelić (yellow card) 70'	Stadium: Rheinpark Stadion; Attendance: 1,105; Referee: Marco Borg (Malta); Assistant referees: Philip Agius (Malta), Charles Micallef (Malta); Fourth official: Paul Caruana (Malta)

6 August 2009 Second leg	Slovan Liberec (Czech Republic)	2–0 (3–0 agg.)	(Liechtenstein) Vaduz	Liberec, Czech Republic
18:00 CEST (UTC+2)	Kerić 17'; Nezmar 22'; Vácha (yellow card) 45'	Report	Stegmayer (yellow card) 53'; Cerrone (yellow card) 54'; Stuckmann (yellow card) 64'; Steil (red card) 74'	Stadium: Stadion u Nisy; Attendance: 4,822; Referee: Markus Strömbergsson (Sweden); Assistant referees: Peter Martinsson (Sweden), Erik Bergsten (Sweden); Fourth official: Johan Hamlin (Sweden)
Note: Slovan Liberec won 3–0 on aggregate.

===== Play-off round =====
20 August 2009 First leg	Dinamo București (Romania)	0–3; Awarded (Note: The match was abandoned at 0–2 in the 88th minute after one Dinamo București fan entered the playing field and other fans invaded the running track around the pitch. The UEFA Control and Disciplinary Body awarded a default 0–3 defeat against Dinamo during an emergency meeting on 25 August.)	(Czech Republic) Slovan Liberec	Bucharest, Romania
20:30 EEST (UTC+3)	Zicu (yellow card) 72'	Report	Liška 5'; Gecov (yellow card) 30'; Blažek 84'	Stadium: Dinamo Stadium; Attendance: 7,955; Referee: Thomas Einwaller (Austria); Assistant referees: Roland Heim (Austria), Klaus Strasser (Austria); Fourth official: Manfred Krassnitzer (Austria)

27 August 2009 Second leg	Slovan Liberec (Czech Republic)	0–3 (a.e.t.) (3–3 agg.) (8–9 p)	(Romania) Dinamo București	Liberec, Czech Republic
19:30 CEST (UTC+2)	Ćorić (yellow card) 48'; Vácha (yellow card) 70'; Blažek (yellow card) 90+3'; Vulin (yellow card) 105'	Report	An. Cristea 2'; Moți (yellow card) 51'; Niculae 57', 81', (yellow card) 75'; Diabaté (yellow card) 74'	Stadium: Stadion u Nisy; Attendance: 5,492; Referee: Alon Yefet (Israel); Assistant referees: Shmuel Shteif (Israel), Nissan Davidy (Israel); Fourth official: Shay Shitrit (Israel)
	Penalties
	Papoušek (penalty scored); Blažek (penalty scored); Vácha (penalty scored); Gecov (penalty missed); Holeňák (penalty scored); Vulin (penalty scored); Dejmek (penalty scored); Dočkal (penalty scored); Gebre Selassie (penalty scored); Liška (penalty missed)		(penalty scored) Niculae; (penalty missed) Zicu; (penalty scored) Boștină; (penalty scored) Torje; (penalty scored) Niculescu; (penalty scored) Moți; (penalty scored) Grigore; (penalty scored) Kone; (penalty scored) Diabaté; (penalty scored) Molinero
Note: 3–3 on aggregate. Dinamo București won 9–8 on penalties.
