= 2009–10 UEFA Europa League qualifying (third and play-off round matches) =

European football competition

This page summarises the matches of the third qualifying and play-off rounds of 2009–10 UEFA Europa League qualifying.

Times are CEST (UTC+2), as listed by UEFA (local times, if different, are in parentheses).

== Third qualifying round ==
=== Summary ===
The first legs were played on 28 and 30 July, and the second legs were played on 4 and 6 August 2009.

The first leg between Fenerbahçe and Honvéd and the second leg between Interblock and Metalurh Donetsk were under investigation by UEFA and German authorities for possible match-fixing.

Team 1	Agg.	Team 2	1st leg	2nd leg
Helsingborgs IF (Sweden)	3–3 (4–5 p) (Note: Order of legs reversed after original draw)	(Bosnia and Herzegovina) Sarajevo	2–1	1–2 (a.e.t.)
Fredrikstad (Norway)	3–7	(Poland) Lech Poznań	1–6	2–1
Rijeka (Croatia)	1–4	(Ukraine) Metalist Kharkiv	1–2	0–2
Roma (Italy)	10–2	(Belgium) Gent	3–1	7–1
Vaslui (Romania)	3–1	(Cyprus) Omonia	2–0	1–1
Slavija (Bosnia and Herzegovina)	1–5	(Slovakia) Košice	0–2	1–3
IFK Göteborg (Sweden)	2–4	(Israel) Hapoel Tel Aviv	1–3	1–1
PSV Eindhoven (Netherlands)	2–0	(Bulgaria) Cherno More	1–0	1–0
Metalurh Donetsk (Ukraine)	5–0	(Slovenia) Interblock	2–0	3–0
Vålerenga (Norway)	2–2 (a)	(Greece) PAOK	1–2	1–0
Rapid Wien (Austria)	4–3	(Cyprus) APOP Kinyras	2–1	2–2 (a.e.t.)
Honka (Finland)	1–3	(Azerbaijan) Qarabağ	0–1	1–2
Vaduz (Liechtenstein)	0–3	(Czech Republic) Slovan Liberec	0–1	0–2
St Patrick's Athletic (Republic of Ireland)	3–3 (a)	(Russia) Krylia Sovetov Samara	1–0	2–3
Randers (Denmark)	1–4	(Germany) Hamburger SV	0–4	1–0
Tromsø (Norway)	4–1	(Croatia) Slaven Belupo	2–1	2–0
Brøndby (Denmark)	3–3 (a)	(Poland) Legia Warsaw	1–1	2–2
Vojvodina (Serbia)	3–5	Austria Wien	1–1	2–4
CSKA Sofia (Bulgaria)	2–1	(Republic of Ireland) Derry City	1–0	1–1
Steaua București (Romania)	6–1	(Scotland) Motherwell	3–0	3–1
Žilina (Slovakia)	2–1	(Croatia) Hajduk Split	1–1	1–0
Braga (Portugal)	1–4	(Sweden) IF Elfsborg	1–2	0–2
Aberdeen (Scotland)	1–8	(Czech Republic) Sigma Olomouc	1–5	0–3
Rabotnicki (North Macedonia)	3–7	(Denmark) Odense	3–4	0–3
Sevojno (Serbia)	0–4	(France) Lille	0–2	0–2
Petrovac (Montenegro)	1–7	(Austria) Sturm Graz	1–2	0–5
Fenerbahçe (Turkey)	6–2	(Hungary) Honvéd	5–1	1–1
Bnei Yehuda (Israel)	2–0	(Portugal) Paços de Ferreira	1–0	1–0
Club Brugge (Belgium)	4–3	(Finland) Lahti	3–2	1–1
Athletic Bilbao (Spain)	2–2 (a)	(Switzerland) Young Boys	0–1	2–1
KR (Iceland)	3–5	(Switzerland) Basel	2–2	1–3
Maccabi Netanya (Israel)	1–10	(Turkey) Galatasaray	1–4	0–6
Dinamo Tbilisi (Georgia (country))	4–5	(Serbia) Red Star Belgrade	2–0	2–5
Polonia Warsaw (Poland)	1–4	(Netherlands) NAC Breda	0–1	1–3
Vėtra (Lithuania)	0–6	(England) Fulham	0–3	0–3

=== Matches ===
30 July 2009
20:45

Helsingborgs IF (Sweden)	2–1	(Bosnia and Herzegovina) Sarajevo
C. Andersson 6' (pen.); Skúlason 58'	Report	Hadžić 22'

Olympia, Helsingborg
Attendance: 11,136
Referee: Mark Whitby (Wales)
6 August 2009
20:15

Sarajevo (Bosnia and Herzegovina)	2–1 (a.e.t.)	(Sweden) Helsingborgs IF
Hadžić 38'; Avdić 78'	Report	Jönsson 2'
Penalties
Jahović (penalty scored); Ihtijarević (penalty scored); Rizvanović (penalty scored); Maksumić (penalty scored); Hamzagić (penalty scored)	5–4	(penalty scored) Sundin; (penalty missed) Ekstrand; (penalty scored) Nilsson; (penalty scored) Makondele; (penalty scored) Wahlstedt

Asim Ferhatović Hase Stadium, Sarajevo
Attendance: 15,000
Referee: Aleksei Kulbakov (Belarus)

3–3 on aggregate; Sarajevo won 5–4 on penalties.

30 July 2009
19:00

Fredrikstad (Norway)	1–6	(Poland) Lech Poznań
Borges 48'	Report	Wilk 10'; Arboleda 22', 25'; Lewandowski 51'; Peszko 54'; Bandrowski 56'

Nye Fredrikstad Stadion, Fredrikstad
Attendance: 6,198
Referee: Mark Clattenburg (England)
6 August 2009
18:30

Lech Poznań (Poland)	1–2	(Norway) Fredrikstad
Lewandowski 50'	Report	Gashi 31'; Piiroja 35'

Stadion Amica, Wronki (Note: Played in Wronki at the Stadion Amica as Lech Poznań's Stadion Miejski was undergoing renovative work.)
Attendance: 4,600
Referee: Cyril Zimmermann (Switzerland)

Lech Poznań won 7–3 on aggregate.

30 July 2009
21:00

Rijeka (Croatia)	1–2	(Ukraine) Metalist Kharkiv
Ahmad Sharbini 59'	Report	Eremenko 43'; Lysenko 85'

Kantrida Stadium, Rijeka
Attendance: 6,000
Referee: Jouni Hyytiä (Finland)
6 August 2009
20:00

Metalist Kharkiv (Ukraine)	2–0	(Croatia) Rijeka
Gueye 12'; Oliynik 60'	Report

Metalist Stadium, Kharkiv
Attendance: 12,900
Referee: Radek Matějek (Czech Republic)

Metalist Kharkiv won 4–1 on aggregate.

30 July 2009
20:45

Roma (Italy)	3–1	(Belgium) Gent
Totti 55', 73' (pen.); Vučinić 85'	Report	Mbaye 22'

Stadio Olimpico, Rome
Attendance: 19,777
Referee: Paulo Costa (Portugal)
6 August 2009
20:30

Gent (Belgium)	1–7	(Italy) Roma
Smolders 78'	Report	Totti 35', 56', 64' (pen.); De Rossi 58', 74'; Ménez 80'; Okaka 86'

Jules Ottenstadion, Ghent
Attendance: 11,800
Referee: Manuel Gräfe (Germany)

Roma won 10–2 on aggregate.

30 July 2009
20:00

Vaslui (Romania)	2–0	(Cyprus) Omonia
Temwanjera 20', 55'	Report

Stadionul Municipal, Vaslui
Attendance: 6,783
Referee: Dougie McDonald (Scotland)
4 August 2009
18:00

Omonia (Cyprus)	1–1	(Romania) Vaslui
Żurawski 84' (pen.)	Report	Wesley 60'

GSP Stadium, Nicosia
Attendance: 15,547
Referee: Paolo Tagliavento (Italy)

Vaslui won 3–1 on aggregate.

30 July 2009
20:15

Slavija (Bosnia and Herzegovina)	0–2	(Slovakia) Košice
	Report	Novák 11'; Škutka 60'

Asim Ferhatović Hase Stadium, Sarajevo (Note: Played in Sarajevo at Asim Ferhatović Hase Stadium as Slavija's Gradski SRC Slavija Stadium did not meet UEFA criteria.)
Attendance: 3,500
Referee: Gediminas Mažeika (Lithuania)
6 August 2009
17:00

Košice (Slovakia)	3–1	(Bosnia and Herzegovina) Slavija
Novák 2'; Bašista 55'; Cicman 90+1'	Report	Đermanović 17'

Lokomotíva Stadium, Košice
Attendance: 8,250
Referee: Stanislav Sukhina (Russia)

Košice won 5–1 on aggregate.

30 July 2009
19:00

IFK Göteborg (Sweden)	1–3	(Israel) Hapoel Tel Aviv
Hysén 21'	Report	Shetcher 73'; Yeboah 78'; Natcho 90+5'

Nya Gamla Ullevi, Gothenburg
Attendance: 7,683
Referee: Robert Schörgenhofer (Austria)
6 August 2009
19:00

Hapoel Tel Aviv (Israel)	1–1	(Sweden) IFK Göteborg
Zandberg 14'	Report	Stiller 52'

Bloomfield Stadium, Tel Aviv
Attendance: 6,200
Referee: Vladimír Hriňák (Slovakia)

Hapoel Tel Aviv won 4–2 on aggregate.

30 July 2009
20:45

PSV Eindhoven (Netherlands)	1–0	(Bulgaria) Cherno More
Marcellis 90+3'	Report

Philips Stadion, Eindhoven
Attendance: 13,170
Referee: Lucílio Batista (Portugal)
6 August 2009
18:00

Cherno More (Bulgaria)	0–1	(Netherlands) PSV Eindhoven
	Report	Coulibaly 30' (o.g.)

Lazur Stadium, Burgas (Note: Played in Burgas at Lazur Stadium as Cherno More's Ticha Stadium did not meet UEFA criteria.)
Attendance: 8,386
Referee: Thorsten Kinhöfer (Germany)

PSV Eindhoven won 2–0 on aggregate.

30 July 2009
19:00

Metalurh Donetsk (Ukraine)	2–0	(Slovenia) Interblock
Hodin 20'; Mário Sérgio 50' (pen.)	Report

Metalurh Stadium, Donetsk
Attendance: 2,000
Referee: Robert Małek (Poland)
6 August 2009
20:00

Interblock (Slovenia)	0–3	(Ukraine) Metalurh Donetsk
	Report	Mkhitaryan 67'; Mguni 73'; Dimitrov 85' (pen.)

Sports Park, Domžale (Note: Played in Domžale at the Sports Park as Interblock's ŽŠD Ljubljana Stadium did not meet UEFA criteria.)
Attendance: 600
Referee: Michael Svendsen (Denmark)

Metalurh Donetsk won 5–0 on aggregate.

30 July 2009
19:00

Vålerenga (Norway)	1–2	(Greece) PAOK
Storbæk 42'	Report	Lino 31'; Muslimović 37'

Ullevaal Stadion, Oslo
Attendance: 3,470
Referee: Alexandru Deaconu (Romania)
6 August 2009
20:45

PAOK (Greece)	0–1	(Norway) Vålerenga
	Report	Berre 60'

Toumba Stadium, Thessaloniki
Attendance: 26,500
Referee: Luca Banti (Italy)

2–2 on aggregate; PAOK won on away goals.

30 July 2009
19:15

Rapid Wien (Austria)	2–1	(Cyprus) APOP Kinyras
Maierhofer 25'; Jelavić 57'	Report	Semedo 79'

Gerhard Hanappi Stadium, Wien
Attendance: 12,800
Referee: Levan Paniashvili (Georgia)
6 August 2009
19:15

APOP Kinyras (Cyprus)	2–2 (a.e.t.)	(Austria) Rapid Wien
Edgar Marcelino 43' (pen.); González 81'	Report	Konrad 30'; Trimmel 111'

GSP Stadium, Nicosia (Note: Played in Nicosia at the GSP Stadium as APOP Kinyras's Peyia Municipal Stadium did not meet UEFA criteria.)
Attendance: 3,227
Referee: Espen Berntsen (Norway)

Rapid Wien won 4–3 on aggregate.

30 July 2009
17:30

Honka (Finland)	0–1	(Azerbaijan) Qarabağ
	Report	Mammadov 69'

Finnair Stadium, Helsinki (Note: Played in Helsinki at Finnair Stadium as Honka's Tapiolan Urheilupuisto was undergoing renovative work.)
Attendance: 2,830
Referee: Albert Toussaint (Luxembourg)
6 August 2009
17:00

Qarabağ (Azerbaijan)	2–1	(Finland) Honka
Mammadov 32'; Sadygov 81'	Report	Koskinen 34'

Tofik Bakhramov Stadium, Baku (Note: Played in Baku at Tofik Bakhramov Stadium as Qarabağ's Guzanli Olympic Stadium did not meet UEFA criteria.)
Attendance: 19,893
Referee: Tomasz Mikulski (Poland)

Qarabağ won 3–1 on aggregate.

30 July 2009
19:30

Vaduz (Liechtenstein)	0–1	(Czech Republic) Slovan Liberec
	Report	Blažek 43'

Rheinpark Stadion, Vaduz
Attendance: 1,105
Referee: Marco Borg (Malta)
6 August 2009
18:00

Slovan Liberec (Czech Republic)	2–0	(Liechtenstein) Vaduz
Kerić 17'; Nezmar 22'	Report

U Nisy Stadium, Liberec
Attendance: 4,822
Referee: Markus Strömbergsson (Sweden)

Slovan Liberec won 3–0 on aggregate.

30 July 2009
20:45

St Patrick's Athletic (Republic of Ireland)	1–0	(Russia) Krylia Sovetov Samara
O'Brien 71'	Report

Richmond Park, Dublin
Attendance: 2,650
Referee: Zsolt Szabó (Hungary)
6 August 2009
16:00

Krylia Sovetov Samara (Russia)	3–2	(Republic of Ireland) St Patrick's Athletic
Bober 41'; Savin 53', 57'	Report	Bober 73' (o.g.); O'Brien 79'

Metallurg Stadium, Samara
Attendance: 16,100
Referee: Tommy Skjerven (Norway)

3–3 on aggregate; St Patrick's Athetic won on away goals.

30 July 2009
20:35

Randers (Denmark)	0–4	(Germany) Hamburger SV
	Report	Guerrero 11'; Boateng 24'; Petrić 53'; Trochowski 80' (pen.)

Essex Park Randers, Randers
Attendance: 5,755
Referee: Anton Genov (Bulgaria)
6 August 2009
20:30

Hamburger SV (Germany)	0–1	(Denmark) Randers
	Report	Berg 35'

HSH Nordbank Arena, Hamburg
Attendance: 41,793
Referee: Kevin Blom (Netherlands)

Hamburger SV won 4–1 on aggregate.

30 July 2009
19:00

Tromsø (Norway)	2–1	(Croatia) Slaven Belupo
Moldskred 67'; Rushfeldt 69'	Report	Šafarić 38' (pen.)

Alfheim stadion, Tromsø
Attendance: 3,554
Referee: Paweł Gil (Poland)
6 August 2009
19:00

Slaven Belupo (Croatia)	0–2	(Norway) Tromsø
	Report	Rushfeldt 14', 82'

Gradski Stadion, Koprivnica
Attendance: 3,200
Referee: Jiří Jech (Czech Republic)

Tromsø won 4–1 on aggregate.

30 July 2009
19:00

Brøndby (Denmark)	1–1	(Poland) Legia Warsaw
Farnerud 73' (pen.)	Report	Iwański 40' (pen.)

Brøndby Stadium, Brøndbyvester
Attendance: 6,955
Referee: Carlos Velasco Carballo (Spain)
6 August 2009
20:00

Legia Warsaw (Poland)	2–2	(Denmark) Brøndby
Giza 16'; Iwański 55' (pen.)	Report	Von Schlebrügge 6'; Madsen 59'

Stadion Wojska Polskiego, Warsaw
Attendance: 5,000
Referee: Fredy Fautrel (France)

3–3 on aggregate; Brøndby won on away goals.

30 July 2009
19:15

Vojvodina (Serbia)	1–1	Austria Wien
Gjurovski 45+2'	Report	Jun 38'

Stadion Crvena Zvezda, Belgrade (Note: Played in Sofia at Vasil Levski National Stadium as CSKA Sofia's Balgarska Armiya Stadium was undergoing renovative work.)
Attendance: 2,000
Referee: Stuart Attwell (England)
6 August 2009
19:15

Austria Wien	4–2	(Serbia) Vojvodina
Jun 45'; Sulimani 63'; Diabing 81'; Okotie 90+3'	Report	Mrđa 31'; Tadić 58'

Franz Horr Stadium, Wien
Attendance: 8,200
Referee: Oleh Oriekhov (Ukraine)

Austria Wien won 5–3 on aggregate.

30 July 2009
19:00

CSKA Sofia (Bulgaria)	1–0	(Republic of Ireland) Derry City
Stoyanov 74'	Report

Vasil Levski National Stadium, Sofia (Note: Played in Belgrade at Stadion Crvena Zvezda as Vojvodina's Karađorđe Stadium did not meet UEFA criteria.)
Attendance: 6,882
Referee: Selçuk Dereli (Turkey)
6 August 2009
20:00

Derry City (Republic of Ireland)	1–1	(Bulgaria) CSKA Sofia
Scullion 82'	Report	Marquinhos 70'

Brandywell Stadium, Derry
Attendance: 2,159
Referee: Jérome Efong Nzolo (Belgium)

CSKA Sofia won 2–1 on aggregate.

30 July 2009
19:45

Steaua București (Romania)	3–0	(Scotland) Motherwell
Craigan 31' (o.g.); Nicoliţă 45+1'; Stancu 60'	Report

Stadionul Steaua, Bucharest
Attendance: 21,714
Referee: Cüneyt Çakır (Turkey)
6 August 2009
20:45

Motherwell (Scotland)	1–3	(Romania) Steaua București
Forbes 17'	Report	Marin 55' (pen.); Stancu 67', 84'

Excelsior Stadium, Airdrie (Note: Played in Airdrie at Excelsior Stadium as Motherwell's Fir Park was undergoing extensive renovative work.)
Attendance: 4,975
Referee: Carlos Clos Gomez (Spain)

Steaua București won 6–1 on aggregate.

30 July 2009
19:30

Žilina (Slovakia)	1–1	(Croatia) Hajduk Split
Kobylík 73' (pen.)	Report	Rafael Paraíba 52'

Stadium Pod Dubňom, Žilina
Attendance: 6,012
Referee: Anastassios Kakos (Greece)
6 August 2009
21:00

Hajduk Split (Croatia)	0–1	(Slovakia) Žilina
	Report	Lietava 76'

Gradski Stadion, Split
Attendance: 16,500
Referee: Bas Nijhuis (Netherlands)

Žilina won 2–1 on aggregate.

30 July 2009
21:45

Braga (Portugal)	1–2	(Sweden) IF Elfsborg
Meyong 50' (pen.)	Report	Daníelsson 16'; Bajrami 73'

Estádio Municipal, Braga
Attendance: 10,110
Referee: Cesar Muniz Fernandez (Spain)
6 August 2009
20:00

IF Elfsborg (Sweden)	2–0	(Portugal) Braga
Keene 16', 32'	Report

Borås Arena, Borås
Attendance: 8,548
Referee: Richard Liesveld (Netherlands)

IF Elfsborg won 4–1 on aggregate.

30 July 2009
20:45

Aberdeen (Scotland)	1–5	(Czech Republic) Sigma Olomouc
Mulgrew 23'	Report	Hubník 18'; Bajer 65'; Petr 69'; Ordoš 83'; Hořava 90'

Pittodrie Stadium, Aberdeen
Attendance: 13,973
Referee: Jérôme Laperriere (Switzerland)
6 August 2009
20:00

Sigma Olomouc (Czech Republic)	3–0	(Scotland) Aberdeen
Janotka 5'; Kaščák 13' (pen.); Hubník 45+1'	Report

Andrův stadion, Olomouc
Attendance: 7,405
Referee: Michael Weiner (Germany)

Sigma Olomouc won 8–1 on aggregate.

30 July 2009
17:00

Rabotnicki (North Macedonia)	3–4	(Denmark) Odense
Savić 21'; Wandeir 24'; Zé Carlos 74'	Report	Cacá 20', 34', 70'; Sørensen 62' (pen.)

Gradski Stadion, Skopje
Attendance: 2,500
Referee: Vladislav Bezborodov (Russia)
6 August 2009
20:05

Odense (Denmark)	3–0	(North Macedonia) Rabotnicki
Utaka 52', 76', 80'	Report

Fionia Park, Odense
Attendance: 6,495
Referee: Hannes Kaasik (Estonia)

Odense won 7–3 on aggregate.

30 July 2009
20:45

Sevojno (Serbia)	0–2	(France) Lille
	Report	Vittek 34'; Hazard 39'

Partizan Stadium, Belgrade (Note: Played in Belgrade at Partizan Stadium as Sevojno's Stadion kraj Valjaonice did not meet UEFA criteria.)
Attendance: 1,992
Referee: Martin Ingvarsson (Sweden)
6 August 2009
19:00

Lille (France)	2–0	(Serbia) Sevojno
Cabaye 73'; de Melo 85'	Report

Stadium Lille-Metropole, Villeneuve-d'Ascq (Note: Played in Villeneuve-d'Ascq at Stadium Lille-Metropole as Lille's Stade Grimonprez Jooris had been replaced temporarily by that stadium. In 2012, Stadium Grimonprez Jooris was replaced definitely by Stade Borne de l'Espoir.)
Attendance: 15,053
Referee: Michael Koukoulakis (Greece)

Lille won 4–0 on aggregate.

30 July 2009
17:00

Petrovac (Montenegro)	1–2	(Austria) Sturm Graz
Divanović 13'	Report	Haas 64' (pen.); Lamotte 76'

Stadion Pod Goricom, Podgorica (Note: Played in Podgorica at Stadion Pod Goricom as Petrovac's Pod Malim Brdom Stadium did not meet UEFA criteria.)
Attendance: 3,200
Referee: João Ferreira (Portugal)
6 August 2009
19:15

Sturm Graz (Austria)	5–0	(Montenegro) Petrovac
Muratović 30'; Hölzl 43', 49'; Hassler 56'; Weber 83'	Report

UPC-Arena, Graz
Attendance: 11,788
Referee: Marcin Borski (Poland)

Sturm Graz won 7–1 on aggregate.

30 July 2009
20:45

Fenerbahçe (Turkey)	5–1	(Hungary) Honvéd
Roberto Carlos 13'; Güiza 30', 40', 61'; Alex 69'	Report	Zsolnai 78'

Şükrü Saracoğlu Stadium, Istanbul
Attendance: 28,099
Referee: Knut Kircher (Germany)
6 August 2009
20:00

Honvéd (Hungary)	1–1	(Turkey) Fenerbahçe
Fritz 87'	Report	Santos 9'

Bozsik Stadion, Budapest (Note: Honvéd had to play behind closed doors due to their fans having racist conduct and displaying an illicit banner during an Intertoto Cup match.)
Attendance: 450
Referee: Paul Allaerts (Belgium)

Fenerbahçe won 6–2 on aggregate.

28 July 2009
18:00

Bnei Yehuda (Israel)	1–0	(Portugal) Paços de Ferreira
Atar 55'	Report

Bloomfield Stadium, Tel Aviv
Attendance: 3,296
Referee: Nicolai Vollquartz (Denmark)
6 August 2009
22:00

Paços de Ferreira (Portugal)	0–1	(Israel) Bnei Yehuda
	Report	Atar 31'

Estádio D. Afonso Henriques, Guimarães (Note: Played in Guimarães at Estádio D. Afonso Henriques as Paços de Ferreira's Estádio da Mata Real did not meet UEFA criteria.)
Attendance: 1,649
Referee: Aleksandar Stavrev (Macedonia)

Bnei Yehuda won 2–0 on aggregate.

30 July 2009
20:30

Club Brugge (Belgium)	3–2	(Finland) Lahti
Akpala 12'; Blondel 35', 90'	Report	Moilanen 6'; Korte 50'

Jan Breydel Stadium, Bruges
Attendance: 23,016
Referee: Aleksei Nikolaev (Russia)
6 August 2009
19:00

Lahti (Finland)	1–1	(Belgium) Club Brugge
Vanninen 87'	Report	Akpala 76'

Lahden Stadion, Lahti
Attendance: 7,500
Referee: Duarte Gomes (Portugal)

Club Brugge won 4–3 on aggregate.

30 July 2009
21:30

Athletic Bilbao (Spain)	0–1	(Switzerland) Young Boys
	Report	Doumbia 23'

San Mamés, Bilbao
Attendance: 19,104
Referee: Costas Kapitanis (Cyprus)
6 August 2009
19:30

Young Boys (Switzerland)	1–2	(Spain) Athletic Bilbao
Frimpong 90+2'	Report	Llorente 26'; Muniain 72'

Stade de Suisse, Bern
Attendance: 21,277
Referee: Alon Yefet (Israel)

2–2 on aggregate; Athletic Bilbao won on away goals.

30 July 2009
21:15

KR (Iceland)	2–2	(Switzerland) Basel
Benediktsson 6'; G. Sigurðarson 9'	Report	Chipperfield 58'; Almerares 83'

KR-völlur, Reykjavík
Attendance: 1,500
Referee: Fernando Teixeira Vitienes (Spain)
6 August 2009
19:30

Basel (Switzerland)	3–1	(Iceland) KR
Frei 29', 80' (pen.); Shaqiri 77'	Report	Takefusa 45+1' (pen.)

St. Jakob-Park, Basel
Attendance: 13,117
Referee: Tony Asumaa (Finland)

Basel won 5–3 on aggregate.

30 July 2009
18:40

Maccabi Netanya (Israel)	1–4	(Turkey) Galatasaray
Yampolsky 25'	Report	Hakan Balta 30'; Kewell 47'; Sarıoğlu 53'; Baroš 73'

Bloomfield Stadium, Tel Aviv (Note: Played in Tel Aviv at Bloomfield Stadium as Maccabi Netanya's Sar-Tov Stadium would be demolished soon.)
Attendance: 3,880
Referee: Nikolai Ivanov (Russia)
6 August 2009
20:00

Galatasaray (Turkey)	6–0	(Israel) Maccabi Netanya
Özbek 2', 49'; Keïta 6'; Nonda 53', 57', 90+1'	Report

Ali Sami Yen Stadium, Istanbul
Attendance: 17,034
Referee: Mike Dean (England)

Galatasaray won 10–1 on aggregate.

30 July 2009
16:00

Dinamo Tbilisi (Georgia (country))	2–0	(Serbia) Red Star Belgrade
Merebashvili 41'; Khmaladze 87'	Report

Boris Paichadze Stadium, Tbilisi
Attendance: 6,850
Referee: Pol van Boekel (Netherlands)
6 August 2009
20:45

Red Star Belgrade (Serbia)	5–2	(Georgia (country)) Dinamo Tbilisi
Perović 18'; Lekić 26', 45+2', 88'; Cadu 76' (pen.)	Report	Lekić 3' (o.g.); Vatsadze 24'

Stadion Crvena Zvezda, Belgrade
Attendance: 20,500
Referee: Said Ennjimi (France)

Red Star Belgrade won 5–4 on aggregate.

30 July 2009
20:00

Polonia Warsaw (Poland)	0–1	(Netherlands) NAC Breda
	Report	Kwakman 40'

Stadion Polonii, Warsaw
Attendance: 6,500
Referee: Sascha Kever (Switzerland)
6 August 2009
20:00

NAC Breda (Netherlands)	3–1	(Poland) Polonia Warsaw
Amoah 25'; Lurling 45'; Kwakman 81'	Report	Ivanovski 59'

Rat Verlegh Stadion, Breda
Attendance: 12,500
Referee: Kristinn Jakobsson (Iceland)

NAC Breda won 4–1 on aggregate.

30 July 2009
19:00

Vėtra (Lithuania)	0–3	(England) Fulham
	Report	Zamora 45'; Murphy 57' (pen.); Seol 85'

Vėtra Stadium, Vilnius
Attendance: 5,420
Referee: Fritz Stuchlik (Austria)
6 August 2009
21:00

Fulham (England)	3–0	(Lithuania) Vėtra
Etuhu 57'; A. Johnson 80', 84'	Report

Craven Cottage, London
Attendance: 15,016
Referee: Istvan Vad (Hungary)

Fulham won 6–0 on aggregate.

== Play-off round ==
=== Summary ===
The first legs were played on 20 August, and the second legs were played on 25 and 27 August 2009.

Team 1	Agg.	Team 2	1st leg	2nd leg
PAOK (Greece)	1–1 (a)	(Netherlands) Heerenveen	1–1	0–0
Dinamo Zagreb (Croatia)	4–2	(Scotland) Heart of Midlothian	4–0	0–2
Werder Bremen (Germany)	8–3	(Kazakhstan) Aktobe	6–3	2–0
Everton (England)	5–1	(Czech Republic) Sigma Olomouc	4–0	1–1
BATE Borisov (Belarus)	4–1	(Bulgaria) Litex Lovech	0–1	4–0 (a.e.t.)
NAC Breda (Netherlands)	2–9	(Spain) Villarreal	1–3	1–6
Lech Poznań (Poland)	1–1 (3–4 p)	(Belgium) Club Brugge	1–0	0–1 (a.e.t.)
Fulham (England)	3–2	(Russia) Amkar Perm	3–1	0–1
Galatasaray (Turkey)	6–1	(Estonia) Levadia Tallinn	5–0	1–1
Teplice (Czech Republic)	2–3	(Israel) Hapoel Tel Aviv	1–2	1–1
Metalurh Donetsk (Ukraine)	4–5	Austria Wien	2–2	2–3 (a.e.t.)
Twente (Netherlands)	3–1	(Azerbaijan) Qarabağ	3–1	0–0
Košice (Slovakia)	4–10 (Note: Order of legs reversed after original draw.)	(Italy) Roma	3–3	1–7
CSKA Sofia (Bulgaria)	2–1	(Russia) Dynamo Moscow	0–0	2–1
Genk (Belgium)	3–6	(France) Lille	1–2	2–4
Bnei Yehuda (Israel)	0–2	(Netherlands) PSV Eindhoven	0–1	0–1
Lazio (Italy)	3–1	(Sweden) IF Elfsborg	3–0	0–1
Trabzonspor (Turkey)	2–3	(France) Toulouse	1–3	1–0
Partizan (Serbia)	3–1	(Slovakia) Žilina	1–1	2–0
Baku (Azerbaijan)	2–8	(Switzerland) Basel	1–3	1–5
Ajax (Netherlands)	7–1	(Slovakia) Slovan Bratislava	5–0	2–1
Sivasspor (Turkey)	0–5	(Ukraine) Shakhtar Donetsk	0–3	0–2
Brøndby (Denmark)	3–4	(Germany) Hertha BSC	2–1	1–3
Athletic Bilbao (Spain)	4–3	(Norway) Tromsø	3–2	1–1
Sarajevo (Bosnia and Herzegovina)	2–3	(Romania) CFR Cluj	1–1	1–2
Rapid Wien (Austria)	2–2 (a)	(England) Aston Villa	1–0	1–2
Steaua București (Romania)	5–1	(Republic of Ireland) St Patrick's Athletic	3–0	2–1
Maribor (Slovenia)	0–3	(Czech Republic) Sparta Prague	0–2	0–1
Nacional (Portugal)	5–4	(Russia) Zenit Saint Petersburg	4–3	1–1
Genoa (Italy)	4–2	(Denmark) Odense	3–1	1–1
Dinamo București (Romania)	3–3 (9–8 p)	(Czech Republic) Slovan Liberec	0–3 (Note: The match was abandoned at 0–2 in the 88th minute after one Dinamo București fan entered the playing field and other fans invaded the running track around the pitch. The UEFA Control and Disciplinary Body awarded a default 0–3 defeat against Dinamo during an emergency meeting on 25 August. After advancing to the group stage, Dinamo were punished by having their first two home matches in the group stage played behind closed doors.)	3–0 (a.e.t.)
Guingamp (France)	2–8	(Germany) Hamburger SV	1–5	1–3
Sion (Switzerland)	2–4	(Turkey) Fenerbahçe	0–2	2–2
Sturm Graz (Austria)	2–1	(Ukraine) Metalist Kharkiv	1–1	1–0
Slavia Prague (Czech Republic)	4–2	(Serbia) Red Star Belgrade	3–0	1–2
Benfica (Portugal)	5–2	(Ukraine) Vorskla Poltava	4–0	1–2
Vaslui (Romania)	2–4	(Greece) AEK Athens	2–1	0–3
Stabæk (Norway)	1–7	(Spain) Valencia	0–3	1–4

=== Matches ===
20 August 2009
19:00

PAOK (Greece)	1–1	(Netherlands) Heerenveen
Ivić 55'	Report	Paulo Henrique 45+3'

Toumba Stadium, Thessaloniki
Attendance: 22,403
Referee: Willie Collum (Scotland)
27 August 2009
18:45

Heerenveen (Netherlands)	0–0	(Greece) PAOK
	Report

Abe Lenstra Stadion, Heerenveen
Attendance: 14,000
Referee: Eduardo Iturralde González (Spain)

1–1 on aggregate; Heerenveen won on away goals.

20 August 2009
21:00

Dinamo Zagreb (Croatia)	4–0	(Scotland) Heart of Midlothian
Mandžukić 5'; Papadopoulos 36'; Vrdoljak 56'; Bišćan 60'	Report

Maksimir Stadium, Zagreb
Attendance: 17,432
Referee: Nikolai Ivanov (Russia)
27 August 2009
20:35

Heart of Midlothian (Scotland)	2–0	(Croatia) Dinamo Zagreb
M. Stewart 18'; Žaliūkas 55'	Report

Tynecastle Stadium, Edinburgh
Attendance: 11,769
Referee: Knut Kircher (Germany)

Dinamo Zagreb won 4–2 on aggregate.

20 August 2009
21:00

Werder Bremen (Germany)	6–3	(Kazakhstan) Aktobe
Boenisch 17'; Pizarro 28'; Naldo 36', 65'; Almeida 60'; Özil 67' (pen.)	Report	Strukov 21', 32'; Smakov 87'

Weserstadion, Bremen
Attendance: 21,446
Referee: Tony Asumaa (Finland)
27 August 2009
16:00

Aktobe (Kazakhstan)	0–2	(Germany) Werder Bremen
	Report	Pizarro 10', 45+1'

Aktobe Central Stadium, Aktobe
Attendance: 8,834
Referee: Vladimír Hriňák (Slovakia)

Werder Bremen won 8–3 on aggregate.

20 August 2009
21:00

Everton (England)	4–0	(Czech Republic) Sigma Olomouc
Saha 34', 73'; Rodwell 40', 54'	Report

Goodison Park, Liverpool
Attendance: 27,433
Referee: Lucílio Batista (Portugal)
27 August 2009
18:00

Sigma Olomouc (Czech Republic)	1–1	(England) Everton
Šultes 80'	Report	Pienaar 44'

Andrův stadion, Olomouc
Attendance: 10,212
Referee: Fredy Fautrel (France)

Everton won 5–1 on aggregate.

20 August 2009
18:00

BATE Borisov (Belarus)	0–1	(Bulgaria) Litex Lovech
	Report	Sandrinho 81'

Haradski Stadium, Barysaw
Attendance: 5,392
Referee: Tommy Skjerven (Norway)
27 August 2009
20:00

Litex Lovech (Bulgaria)	0–4 (a.e.t.)	(Belarus) BATE Borisov
	Report	Sasnowski 86', 99'; Rodionov 95'; Skavysh 118'

Lovech Stadium, Lovech
Attendance: 4,000
Referee: Manuel Gräfe (Germany)

BATE Borisov won 4–1 on aggregate.

20 August 2009
19:00

NAC Breda (Netherlands)	1–3	(Spain) Villarreal
Loran 17'	Report	Rossi 14'; Ibagaza 49'; Llorente 90+2'

Rat Verlegh Stadion, Breda
Attendance: 15,200
Referee: Stefan Johannesson (Sweden)
27 August 2009
20:30

Villarreal (Spain)	6–1	(Netherlands) NAC Breda
Cazorla 16'; Rossi 23' (pen.), 37' (pen.); Senna 46'; Jonathan 57'; Kiko 61'	Report	De Graaf 80'

El Madrigal, Villarreal
Attendance: 12,150
Referee: Craig Thomson (Scotland)

Villarreal won 9–2 on aggregate.

20 August 2009
20:30

Lech Poznań (Poland)	1–0	(Belgium) Club Brugge
Peszko 90+3'	Report

Stadion Amica, Wronki
Attendance: 4,419
Referee: Jorge Sousa (Portugal)
27 August 2009
20:30

Club Brugge (Belgium)	1–0 (a.e.t.)	(Poland) Lech Poznań
Sonck 79'	Report
Penalties
Sonck (penalty scored); Odjidja-Ofoe (penalty scored); Simaeys (penalty scored); Klukowski (penalty scored)	4–3	(penalty scored) Bosacki; (penalty missed) Đurđević; (penalty scored) Golik; (penalty scored) Gancarczyk; (penalty missed) Rengifo

Jan Breydel Stadium, Bruges
Attendance: 25,657
Referee: Alan Kelly (Republic of Ireland)

1–1 on aggregate; Club Brugge won 4–3 on penalties.

20 August 2009
21:00

Fulham (England)	3–1	(Russia) Amkar Perm
A. Johnson 4'; Dempsey 51'; Zamora 75'	Report	Grishin 77'

Craven Cottage, London
Attendance: 13,029
Referee: Pedro Proença (Portugal)
27 August 2009
16:00

Amkar Perm (Russia)	1–0	(England) Fulham
Kushev 90'	Report

Zvezda Stadium, Perm
Attendance: 19,500
Referee: Markus Strömbergsson (Sweden)

Fulham won 3–2 on aggregate.

20 August 2009
20:45

Galatasaray (Turkey)	5–0	(Estonia) Levadia Tallinn
Keïta 21', 45'; Baroš 56' (pen.); Kewell 78'; Leitan 88' (o.g.)	Report

Ali Sami Yen Stadium, Istanbul
Attendance: 19,750
Referee: Cyril Zimmermann (Switzerland)
27 August 2009
20:00

Levadia Tallinn (Estonia)	1–1	(Turkey) Galatasaray
E. Puri 50'	Report	Nonda 64'

Lilleküla Stadium, Tallinn (Note: Played in Tallinn at Lilleküla Stadium as Levadia Tallinn's Kadrioru Stadium did not meet UEFA criteria.)
Attendance: 2,800
Referee: Istvan Vad (Hungary)

Galatasaray won 6–1 on aggregate.

20 August 2009
18:00

Teplice (Czech Republic)	1–2	(Israel) Hapoel Tel Aviv
Vondrášek 89'	Report	Enyeama 74' (pen.); Vermuth 90+3'

Na Stínadlech, Teplice
Attendance: 5,122
Referee: Espen Berntsen (Norway)
27 August 2009
18:00

Hapoel Tel Aviv (Israel)	1–1	(Czech Republic) Teplice
Ben Dayan 90+1'	Report	Vondrášek 89'

Bloomfield Stadium, Tel Aviv
Attendance: 7,269
Referee: Stanislav Sukhina (Russia)

Hapoel Tel Aviv won 3–2 on aggregate.

20 August 2009
19:00

Metalurh Donetsk (Ukraine)	2–2	Austria Wien
Ekeh 17'; Dimitrov 90+2'	Report	Ačimovič 8'; Diabang 48'

Metalurh Stadium, Donetsk
Attendance: 4,100
Referee: Michael Koukoulakis (Greece)
27 August 2009
19:15

Austria Wien	3–2 (a.e.t.)	(Ukraine) Metalurh Donetsk
Okotie 36'; Ačimovič 70' (pen.); Sulimani 115'	Report	Tănasă 20'; Mkhitaryan 54'

Franz Horr Stadium, Vienna
Attendance: 10,500
Referee: Kristinn Jakobsson (Iceland)

Austria Wien won 5–4 on aggregate.

20 August 2009
20:00

Twente (Netherlands)	3–1	(Azerbaijan) Qarabağ
Ruiz 38', 66'; Douglas 81'	Report	Nadirov 8'

De Grolsch Veste, Enschede
Attendance: 23,000
Referee: Andre Marriner (England)
27 August 2009
17:00

Qarabağ (Azerbaijan)	0–0	(Netherlands) Twente
	Report

Tofik Bakhramov Stadium, Baku
Attendance: 14,000
Referee: Alexandru Deaconu (Romania)

Twente won 3–1 on aggregate.

20 August 2009
16:30

Košice (Slovakia)	3–3	(Italy) Roma
Milinković 5'; Novák 71' (pen.), 81'	Report	Totti 38' (pen.), 67'; Ménez 52'

Lokomotíva Stadium, Košice
Attendance: 8,450
Referee: Peter Rasmussen (Denmark)
27 August 2009
20:45

Roma (Italy)	7–1	(Slovakia) Košice
Totti 1', 6', 86'; Guberti 8'; Cerci 17'; Ménez 18'; Riise 70'	Report	Novák 38'

Stadio Olimpico, Rome
Attendance: 16,145
Referee: Selçuk Dereli (Turkey)

Roma won 10–4 on aggregate.

20 August 2009
19:00

CSKA Sofia (Bulgaria)	0–0	(Russia) Dynamo Moscow
	Report

Vasil Levski National Stadium, Sofia
Attendance: 23,250
Referee: Robert Schörgenhofer (Austria)
27 August 2009
18:00

Dynamo Moscow (Russia)	1–2	(Bulgaria) CSKA Sofia
Kerzhakov 10'	Report	Delev 14'; Ivanov 56'

Arena Khimki, Khimki (Note: Played in Khimki at Arena Khimki as Dynamo Moscow's Dynamo Stadium was undergoing renovative work.)
Attendance: 8,486
Referee: Michael Weiner (Germany)

CSKA Sofia won 2–1 on aggregate.

20 August 2009
20:45

Genk (Belgium)	1–2	(France) Lille
Tőzsér 58'	Report	Dumont 40'; Vittek 56'

Cristal Arena, Genk
Attendance: 12,278
Referee: Anton Genov (Bulgaria)
27 August 2009
18:45

Lille (France)	4–2	(Belgium) Genk
Melo 11', 74'; Dumont 59'; Hazard 70'	Report	Barda 24' (pen.); Tőzsér 87'

Stadium Lille-Metropole, Villeneuve-d'Ascq
Attendance: 16,055
Referee: Gianluca Rocchi (Italy)

Lille won 6–3 on aggregate.

20 August 2009
18:30

Bnei Yehuda (Israel)	0–1	(Netherlands) PSV Eindhoven
	Report	Afellay 23'

Bloomfield Stadium, Tel Aviv
Attendance: 7,300
Referee: Jonas Eriksson (Sweden)
27 August 2009
20:45

PSV Eindhoven (Netherlands)	1–0	(Israel) Bnei Yehuda
Simons 25' (pen.)	Report

Philips Stadion, Eindhoven
Attendance: 11,000
Referee: César Muñiz Fernández (Spain)

PSV Eindhoven won 2–0 on aggregate.

20 August 2009
20:45

Lazio (Italy)	3–0	(Sweden) IF Elfsborg
Kolarov 23'; Zárate 35'; Mauri 69'	Report

Stadio Olimpico, Rome
Attendance: 17,074
Referee: Dougie McDonald (Scotland)
27 August 2009
19:00

IF Elfsborg (Sweden)	1–0	(Italy) Lazio
Avdić 70'	Report

Borås Arena, Borås
Attendance: 11,693
Referee: Oleh Oriekhov (Ukraine)

Lazio won 3–1 on aggregate.

20 August 2009
18:45

Trabzonspor (Turkey)	1–3	(France) Toulouse
Song 16'	Report	Gignac 12', 59'; Mansaré 90+1'

Hüseyin Avni Aker Stadium, Trabzon
Attendance: 12,648
Referee: Pavel Královec (Czech Republic)
27 August 2009
21:00

Toulouse (France)	0–1	(Turkey) Trabzonspor
	Report	Gülselam 55'

Stadium Municipal, Toulouse
Attendance: 15,535
Referee: Serge Gumienny (Belgium)

Toulouse won 3–2 on aggregate.

20 August 2009
20:15

Partizan (Serbia)	1–1	(Slovakia) Žilina
Cléo 16' (pen.)	Report	Adauto 34' (pen.)

Stadion Partizana, Belgrade
Attendance: 14,143
Referee: Levan Paniashvili (Georgia)
27 August 2009
19:30

Žilina (Slovakia)	0–2	(Serbia) Partizan
	Report	Diarra 59'; Ilić 65'

Stadium Pod Dubňom, Žilina
Attendance: 10,650
Referee: Nicolai Vollquartz (Denmark)

Partizan won 3–1 on aggregate.

20 August 2009
17:00

Baku (Azerbaijan)	1–3	(Switzerland) Basel
Pérez 49'	Report	Streller 71', 74'; Huggel 77'

Tofik Bakhramov Stadium, Baku
Attendance: 13,000
Referee: Zsolt Szabó (Hungary)
27 August 2009
19:30

Basel (Switzerland)	5–1	(Azerbaijan) Baku
Almerares 32'; Gelabert 36'; Frei 63'; Shaqiri 74'; Mustafi 84'	Report	Felipe 33'

St. Jakob-Park, Basel
Attendance: 7,113
Referee: Hannes Kaasik (Estonia)

Basel won 8–2 on aggregate.

20 August 2009
20:45

Ajax (Netherlands)	5–0	(Slovakia) Slovan Bratislava
Suárez 43', 65', 79', 84'; Donald 90+2'	Report

Amsterdam ArenA, Amsterdam
Attendance: 20,168
Referee: Mark Clattenburg (England)
27 August 2009
18:30

Slovan Bratislava (Slovakia)	1–2	(Netherlands) Ajax
Sylvestr 45+2'	Report	De Jong 30'; Bakircioglu 84'

Tehelné pole, Bratislava
Attendance: 6,880
Referee: Costas Kapitanis (Cyprus)

Ajax won 7–1 on aggregate.

20 August 2009
20:00

Sivasspor (Turkey)	0–3	(Ukraine) Shakhtar Donetsk
	Report	Gai 6'; Ilsinho 76'; Kobin 87'

4 Eylül, Sivas
Attendance: 7,231
Referee: Mike Dean (England)
25 August 2009 (Note: Played on 25 August due to Shakhtar Donetsk's participation in the 2009 UEFA Super Cup.)
18:00

Shakhtar Donetsk (Ukraine)	2–0	(Turkey) Sivasspor
Jádson 21' (pen.); Luiz Adriano 59' (pen.)	Report

RSC Olimpiyskiy, Donetsk
Attendance: 18,000
Referee: Matteo Trefoloni (Italy)

Shakhtar Donetsk won 5–0 on aggregate.

20 August 2009
20:30

Brøndby (Denmark)	2–1	(Germany) Hertha BSC
Bischoff 52'; Pejčinović 70' (o.g.)	Report	Domovchiyski 53'

Brøndby Stadium, Brøndbyvester
Attendance: 12,050
Referee: Kevin Blom (Netherlands)
27 August 2009
18:15

Hertha BSC (Germany)	3–1	(Denmark) Brøndby
Kačar 75', 86'; Dárdai 80'	Report	Rasmussen 51'

Friedrich Ludwig Jahn Sportpark, Berlin (Note: Played in Berlin at Friedrich Ludwig Jahn Sportpark as Hertha BSC's Olympiastadion was hosting the 2009 World Championships in Athletics.)
Attendance: 14,743
Referee: Paolo Tagliavento (Italy)

Hertha BSC won 4–3 on aggregate.

20 August 2009
22:00

Athletic Bilbao (Spain)	3–2	(Norway) Tromsø
Martínez 62' (pen.); De Marcos 86'; Llorente 90'	Report	Moldskred 42'; Lindpere 78'

San Mamés, Bilbao
Attendance: 19,900
Referee: Sascha Kever (Switzerland)
27 August 2009
19:00

Tromsø (Norway)	1–1	(Spain) Athletic Bilbao
Rushfeldt 61'	Report	Martínez 57' (pen.)

Alfheim stadion, Tromsø
Attendance: 5,988
Referee: Tony Chapron (France)

Athletic Bilbao won 4–3 on aggregate.

20 August 2009
20:15

Sarajevo (Bosnia and Herzegovina)	1–1	(Romania) CFR Cluj
Hadžić 77'	Report	Dani 19'

Asim Ferhatović Hase Stadium, Sarajevo
Attendance: 26,000
Referee: Robert Małek (Poland)
27 August 2009
18:45

CFR Cluj (Romania)	2–1	(Bosnia and Herzegovina) Sarajevo
Koné 40'; Mureșan 69'	Report	Avdić 81'

Stadionul Dr. Constantin Rădulescu, Cluj-Napoca
Attendance: 10,800
Referee: Duarte Gomes (Portugal)

CFR Cluj won 3–2 on aggregate.

20 August 2009
19:15

Rapid Wien (Austria)	1–0	(England) Aston Villa
Jelavić 1'	Report

Gerhard Hanappi Stadium, Wien
Attendance: 17,600
Referee: Alexandru Tudor (Romania)
27 August 2009
21:00

Aston Villa (England)	2–1	(Austria) Rapid Wien
Milner 38' (pen.); Carew 53'	Report	Jelavić 76'

Villa Park, Birmingham
Attendance: 22,563
Referee: Carlos Velasco Carballo (Spain)

2–2 on aggregate; Rapid Wien won on away goals.

20 August 2009
19:30

Steaua București (Romania)	3–0	(Republic of Ireland) St Patrick's Athletic
Nicoliță 56'; Stancu 65', 80'	Report

Stadionul Steaua, Bucharest
Attendance: 0 (Note: The first of two home games which Steaua București had to play behind closed doors because their fans had flown banners offensive to Újpest in the second qualifying round.)
Referee: Aleksei Nikolaev (Russia)
27 August 2009
20:45

St Patrick's Athletic (Republic of Ireland)	1–2	(Romania) Steaua București
O'Connor 49'	Report	Nicoliță 80'; Ochiroșii 89'

RDS Arena, Dublin (Note: Played in Dublin at RDS Arena as St Patrick's Athletic's Richmond Park did not meet UEFA criteria.)
Attendance: 7,198
Referee: Jiří Jech (Czech Republic)

Steaua București won 5–1 on aggregate.

20 August 2009
20:45

Maribor (Slovenia)	0–2	(Czech Republic) Sparta Prague
	Report	Wilfried 29', 86'

Ljudski vrt, Maribor
Attendance: 8,200
Referee: Jouni Hyytiä (Finland)
27 August 2009
20:00

Sparta Prague (Czech Republic)	1–0	(Slovenia) Maribor
Wilfried 3'	Report

AXA Arena, Prague
Attendance: 12,710
Referee: Aleksei Kulbakov (Belarus)

Sparta Prague won 3–0 on aggregate.

20 August 2009
21:30

Nacional (Portugal)	4–3	(Russia) Zenit Saint Petersburg
Luís Alberto 30'; Aurélio 37'; Silva 53'; Rúben Micael 74'	Report	Semshov 44', 55'; Tekke 90+2'

Estádio da Madeira, Funchal
Attendance: 2,500
Referee: Cüneyt Çakır (Turkey)
27 August 2009
18:30

Zenit Saint Petersburg (Russia)	1–1	(Portugal) Nacional
Tekke 34'	Report	Micael 89'

Petrovsky Stadium, Saint Petersburg
Attendance: 19,500
Referee: Ivan Bebek (Croatia)

Nacional won 5–4 on aggregate.

20 August 2009
20:45

Genoa (Italy)	3–1	(Denmark) Odense
Moretti 9'; Figueroa 48', 56'	Report	Gíslason 58'

Stadio Luigi Ferraris, Genoa
Attendance: 21,889
Referee: Stéphane Lannoy (France)
27 August 2009
20:30

Odense (Denmark)	1–1	(Italy) Genoa
Figueroa 45+2' (o.g.)	Report	Criscito 53'

Fionia Park, Odense
Attendance: 10,001
Referee: Björn Kuipers (Netherlands)

Genoa won 4–2 on aggregate.

20 August 2009
19:30

Dinamo București (Romania)	0–3 Awarded (Note: The match was abandoned at 0–2 in the 88th minute after one Dinamo București fan entered the playing field and other fans invaded the running track around the pitch. The UEFA Control and Disciplinary Body awarded a default 0–3 defeat against Dinamo during an emergency meeting on 25 August.)	(Czech Republic) Slovan Liberec
	Report	Liška 6'; Blažek 84'

Stadionul Dinamo, Bucharest
Attendance: 7,955
Referee: Thomas Einwaller (Austria)
27 August 2009
19:30

Slovan Liberec (Czech Republic)	0–3 (a.e.t.)	(Romania) Dinamo București
	Report	An. Cristea 2'; Niculae 57', 81'
Penalties
Papoušek (penalty scored); Blažek (penalty scored); Vácha (penalty scored); Gecov (penalty missed); Holeňák (penalty scored); Vulin (penalty scored); Dejmek (penalty scored); Dočkal (penalty scored); Gebre Selassie (penalty scored); Liška (penalty missed)	8–9	(penalty scored) Niculae; (penalty missed) Zicu; (penalty scored) Boștină; (penalty scored) Torje; (penalty scored) Niculescu; (penalty scored) Moți; (penalty scored) Grigore; (penalty scored) Kone; (penalty scored) Diabaté; (penalty scored) Molinero

U Nisy Stadium, Liberec
Attendance: 5,490
Referee: Alon Yefet (Israel)

3–3 on aggregate; Dinamo București won 9–8 on penalties.

20 August 2009
18:45

Guingamp (France)	1–5	(Germany) Hamburger SV
Hesl 89' (o.g.)	Report	Guerrero 7'; Petrić 11', 26', 86'; Berg 51'

Stade du Roudourou, Guingamp
Attendance: 12,694
Referee: Marcin Borski (Poland)
27 August 2009
20:30

Hamburger SV (Germany)	3–1	(France) Guingamp
Tesche 42', 51'; Berg 47'	Report	Mathis 90'

HSH Nordbank Arena, Hamburg
Attendance: 25,798
Referee: Martin Ingvarsson (Sweden)

Hamburger SV won 8–2 on aggregate.

20 August 2009
20:30

Sion (Switzerland)	0–2	(Turkey) Fenerbahçe
	Report	Santos 44'; Kazim-Richards 84'

Stade de Genève, Geneva (Note: Played in Geneva at Stade de Genève as Sion's Stade Tourbillon did not meet UEFA criteria.)
Attendance: 9,500
Referee: Daniel Stålhammar (Sweden)
27 August 2009
20:30

Fenerbahçe (Turkey)	2–2	(Switzerland) Sion
Santos 2', 41' (pen.)	Report	Vanczák 9'; Chihab 31' (pen.)

Şükrü Saracoğlu Stadium, Istanbul
Attendance: 24,083
Referee: Bruno Paixão (Portugal)

Fenerbahçe won 4–2 on aggregate.

20 August 2009
19:15

Sturm Graz (Austria)	1–1	(Ukraine) Metalist Kharkiv
Beichler 31'	Report	Oliynyk 76'

UPC-Arena, Graz
Attendance: 11,219
Referee: Eric Braamhaar (Netherlands)
27 August 2009
19:15

Metalist Kharkiv (Ukraine)	0–1	(Austria) Sturm Graz
	Report	Beichler 32'

Metalist Stadium, Kharkiv
Attendance: 22,400
Referee: Svein Oddvar Moen (Norway)

Sturm Graz won 2–1 on aggregate.

20 August 2009
20:00

Slavia Prague (Czech Republic)	3–0	(Serbia) Red Star Belgrade
Šenkeřík 34', 65'; Vlček 81'	Report

Synot Tip Arena, Prague
Attendance: 12,625
Referee: Paul Allaerts (Belgium)
27 August 2009
20:30

Red Star Belgrade (Serbia)	2–1	(Czech Republic) Slavia Prague
Bogdanović 23' (pen.); Perović 45'	Report	Vlček 63'

Stadion Crvena Zvezda, Belgrade
Attendance: 30,100
Referee: Thorsten Kinhöfer (Germany)

Slavia Prague won 4–2 on aggregate.

20 August 2009
20:45

Benfica (Portugal)	4–0	(Ukraine) Vorskla Poltava
Di María 31'; Cardozo 55' (pen.); Saviola 57'; Weldon 77'	Report

Estádio da Luz, Lisbon
Attendance: 34,177
Referee: Darko Čeferin (Slovenia)
27 August 2009
20:45

Vorskla Poltava (Ukraine)	2–1	(Portugal) Benfica
Sachko 48'; Yesin 74'	Report	Saviola 59'

Butovsky Vorskla Stadium, Poltava
Attendance: 8,000
Referee: Claudio Circhetta (Switzerland)

Benfica won 5–2 on aggregate.

20 August 2009
20:00

Vaslui (Romania)	2–1	(Greece) AEK Athens
Wesley 29', 83' (pen.)	Report	Blanco 69' (pen.)

Municipal Vaslui, Vaslui
Attendance: 5,185
Referee: Saïd Ennjimi (France)
27 August 2009
20:00

AEK Athens (Greece)	3–0	(Romania) Vaslui
Manduca 59'; Scocco 74', 79'	Report

Olympic Stadium, Athens
Attendance: 19,921
Referee: Damir Skomina (Slovenia)

AEK Athens won 4–2 on aggregate.

20 August 2009
21:00

Stabæk (Norway)	0–3	(Spain) Valencia
	Report	Hernández 29'; Villa 35'; Joaquín 81'

Telenor Arena, Bærum
Attendance: 9,566
Referee: Aleksandar Stavrev (Macedonia)
27 August 2009
21:30

Valencia (Spain)	4–1	(Norway) Stabæk
Miku 28', 29', 80'; Žigić 77'	Report	Farnerud 36'

Mestalla, Valencia
Attendance: 12,000
Referee: Bas Nijhuis (Netherlands)

Valencia won 7–1 on aggregate.
