= Zeman =

Zeman (feminine: Zemanová) is a Czech and Slovak surname. The word originally denoted a lower nobleman with a coat of arms, and later a free owner of an estate. The oldest document where the word is used as a surname is from 1550. Notable people with the surname include:

== Sports ==
- Adam Zeman (ice hockey) (born 1991), Czech ice hockey player
- Andrea Zemanová (born 1993), Czech freestyle skier
- Bob Zeman (1937–2019), American football defensive back
- Bohumír Zeman (born 1957), Czech alpine skier
- David Zeman (born 1942), Czech footballer
- Ed Zeman (born 1963), American football player
- Irena Zemanová (born 1977), Czech figure skater
- Jaromír Zeman (1886–?), Czech tennis player
- Jaroslav Zeman (born 1962), Czech wrestler
- Jindřich Zeman (born 1950), Czech luger
- Jiří Zeman (born 1982), Czech ice hockey player
- Josef Zeman (footballer) (1915–1999), Czech footballer
- Lenka Zemanová (born 1979), Czech triathlete
- Marián Zeman (born 1974), Slovak footballer
- Martin Zeman (born 1989), Czech footballer
- Michal Zeman (born 1984), Czech footballer
- Miroslav Zeman (1946–2025), Czech wrestler
- Štěpán Zeman (born 1997), Czech handball player
- Walter Zeman (1927–1991), Austrian footballer
- Zdeněk Zeman (born 1947), Czech-Italian football coach

== Other ==
- Adam Zeman (neurologist) (born 1957), British neurologist
- Allan Zeman (born 1949), Hong Kong businessman
- Anna Zemanová (born 1959), Slovak environmentalist and politician
- Brock Zeman (born 1981), Canadian singer-songwriter
- Eduard Zeman (1948–2017), Czech politician
- Edward J. Zeman (1905–1966), American politician
- Ivana Zemanová (born 1965), first lady of the Czech Republic
- Jacklyn Zeman (1953–2023), American actress
- Karel Zeman (1910–1989), Czech filmmaker
- Ludmila Zeman (born 1947), Czech-Canadian artist, animator and children's books writer
- Miloš Zeman (born 1944), Czech politician, president of the Czech Republic in 2013–2023
- Ned Zeman (born 1966), American journalist and screenwriter
- Zbyněk Zeman (1928–2011), Czech historian

== See also ==
- Josefa Humpalová–Zeman (1870–1906), Czech-American journalist, newspaper founder and feminist
- Zeeman (disambiguation)
