= Jakub Vojta =

Jakub Vojta may refer to:

- Jakub Vojta (footballer) (born 1991), Czech footballer
- Jakub Vojta (ice hockey) (born 1987), Czech ice hockey player
