= Josip Ćorić =

Bosnian footballer

Personal information
- Full name: Josip Ćorić
- Date of birth: 9 November 1988 (age 37)
- Place of birth: Zagreb, SR Croatia, SFR Yugoslavia
- Height: 1.84 m (6 ft 1/2 in)
- Position: Midfielder

Team information
- Current team: Dinamo Odranski Obrež

Youth career
- 1997–2001: Hrvatski Dragovoljac
- 2001–2002: Dinamo Zagreb
- 2002–2004: Hrvatski Dragovoljac
- 2004: Zagreb
- 2005–2006: Hrvatski Dragovoljac

Senior career*
Years	Team	Apps	(Gls)
2006–2007	Rudeš		(3)
2007–2008	Moslavina	35	(4)
2009	Seekirchen	14	(11)
2009–2010	Slovan Liberec	6	(2)
2010	Spartak Trnava	11	(0)
2011	DAC Dunajská Streda	20	(4)
2012	Red Bull Salzburg Juniors	11	(6)
2012–2013	Liefering	23	(16)
2013	Istra 1961	1	(0)
2013–2014	Sesvete	37	(11)
2015	Dinamo Zagreb	0	(0)
2015	→ Sesvete (loan)	13	(3)
2015–2017	Lokomotiva Zagreb	42	(8)
2017–2018	Široki Brijeg	20	(4)
2018–2019	Hrvatski Dragovoljac	12	(4)
2019–2020	Lučko	0	(0)
2020–	Dinamo Odranski Obrež		

International career
2009–2010	Bosnia and Herzegovina U21	4	(2)
- * Club domestic league appearances and goals as of 12 August 2019

Josip Ćorić (born 9 November 1988) is a Bosnian footballer who plays for Dinamo Odranski Obrež.

== Club career ==
He came to Spartak Trnava in summer 2010.

== Personal life ==
Josip is the older brother of Ante Ćorić.
