= Jan Halama =

Czech footballer

Personal information
- Date of birth: 14 July 1988 (age 38)
- Place of birth: Czechoslovakia
- Height: 1.82 m (6 ft 0 in)
- Position: Midfielder

Youth career
- Sparta Prague

Senior career*
| Years | Team | Apps | (Gls) |
| 2007 | Marila Příbram | 15 | (0) |
| 2007–2009 | Viktoria Plzeň | 6 | (1) |
| 2009–2010 | Bohemians | 8 | (0) |
| 2010 | Senica | 6 | (0) |
| 2010–2011 | Vysočina | 23 | (1) |
| 2011–2014 | České Budějovice | 13 | (1) |
| 2011–2012 | → Vysočina (loan) | 19 | (1) |
| 2013–2014 | → Bohemians (loan) | 8 | (1) |
| 2015–2016 | Jablonec nad Jizerou | | |
| 2016–2017 | Jiskra Mšeno | | |
| 2017–2018 | Nová Ves nad Nisou | | |
| 2018 | Pěnčín | | |
| 2018–2020 | KOVO | | |
| 2020 | Rychnov nad Kněžnou | | |

International career^{‡}
| 2003–2004 | Czech Republic U16 | 11 | (1) |
| 2004–2005 | Czech Republic U17 | 9 | (0) |
| 2005–2006 | Czech Republic U18 | 11 | (1) |
| 2006–2007 | Czech Republic U19 | 14 | (0) |
| 2007 | Czech Republic U20 | 1 | (0) |
| 2008 | Czech Republic U21 | 1 | (0) |
- * Club domestic league appearances and goals as of 31 December 2012 ‡ National team caps and goals as of 22 December 2014

Jan Halama (born 14 July 1988, in Jablonec nad Nisou) is a retired Czech footballer.
