= Stanislav Nohýnek =

Czech footballer (born 1983)

Personal information
- Full name: Stanislav Nohýnek
- Date of birth: 2 August 1983 (age 43)
- Place of birth: Příbram, Czechoslovakia
- Height: 1.83 m (6 ft 0 in)
- Position: Centre back

Youth career
- 1990–1995: TJ Spartak Rožmitál
- 1995–2004: Příbram

Senior career*
Years	Team	Apps	(Gls)
2004–2011	Příbram	81	(3)
2011	Zemplín Michalovce	6	(0)
2012–2013	Sunkar Kaskelen	26	(0)
2013–2014	Králův Dvůr		
2015–2017	USC Schweiggers		
2017–2018	SC Union Thaya	9	(1)
- * Club domestic league appearances and goals

Stanislav Nohýnek (born 2 August 1983) is a former Czech footballer.

== Club career ==
In August 2011, he joined Slovak club Zemplín Michalovce on a one-year contract.
