= Emin Sulimani =

Austrian retired football midfielder (born 1986)

Personal information
- Full name: Emin Sulimani
- Date of birth: 4 August 1986 (age 40)
- Place of birth: Wels, Austria
- Height: 1.72 m (5 ft 8 in)
- Position: Midfielder

Team information
- Current team: Hertha Wels (assistant)

Youth career
- 1993–1998: Hertha Wels
- 1998–2000: LASK Linz
- 2000–2001: FC Wels
- 2001–2004: SV Ried

Senior career*
Years	Team	Apps	(Gls)
2003–2007	SV Ried	65	(5)
2007–2010	Austria Wien	86	(7)
2010–2011	LASK Linz	9	(0)
2011–2012	Admira Wacker	11	(1)
2014–2015	Hertha Wels		
2015	SV Horn II		

International career
2007–2008	Austria U21	14	(3)

Managerial career
- 2016–2018: Hertha Wels (reserves)
- 2018–: Hertha Wels (assistant)
- 2019: Hertha Wels (caretaker)
- 2022–2024: Hertha Wels
- 2024–: SV Stripfing
- * Club domestic league appearances and goals

Emin Sulimani (born 4 August 1986 in Wels) is an Austrian retired football midfielder. He is currently assistant manager of Hertha Wels.

He is of Albanian descent and he has a younger brother, Benjamin Sulimani.

== Coaching career ==
After two seasons as manager for the reserve team of Hertha Wels, Sulimani became assistant manager of the first team ahead of the 2018-19 season under manager Stephan Kuranda. Among others, Sulimani coached one of his younger brothers, Harun Sulimani, who played for the first team. On 1 April 2019, manager Kuranda was fired and Sulimani was appointed caretaker manager for the rest of the season. Markus Waldl was appointed manager of the club at the end of the season, and Sulimani continued in his assistant manager role.

In December 2024, Sulimani became the head coach of SV Stripfing.
