= Elton Lira =

Brazilian footballer (born 1986)

Personal information
- Full name: Elton Santiago dos Santos Lira
- Date of birth: 21 September 1986 (age 40)
- Place of birth: São Paulo, Brazil
- Height: 1.85 m (6 ft 1 in)
- Position: Midfielder

Youth career
- Matsubara
- –2006: Corinthians
- 2006: XV de Jaú

Senior career*
Years	Team	Apps	(Gls)
2006–2007	Juventus	0	(0)
2008–2010	Brno	30	(1)
2010	Duque de Caxias	5	(0)
2011	Paysandu		
2012–2013	Zagłębie Lubin	20	(1)
2014–2016	Santa Rita		
2016	ASA	13	(0)
2016	CRB	5	(0)
2017	Juazeirense		
- * Club domestic league appearances and goals

Elton Santiago dos Santos Lira (born 21 September 1986) is a Brazilian former professional footballer who played as a midfielder.
