= Jiří Zeman =

Czech ice hockey player

- Born: February 12, 1982 (age 43); Vsetín, Czechoslovakia
- Height: 5 ft 10 in (178 cm)
- Weight: 176 lb (80 kg; 12 st 8 lb)
- Position: Defence
- Shoots: Left
- Czech Extraliga team: HC Litvínov
- Playing career: 2000–present

Jiří Zeman (born February 12, 1982) is a Czech professional ice hockey defenceman. He played with HC Litvínov in the Czech Extraliga during the 2012–13 Czech Extraliga season.

== Career statistics ==
			Regular season					Playoffs
Season	Team	League	GP	G	A	Pts	PIM	GP	G	A	Pts	PIM
1999–00	HC Kladno U20	Czech U20	43	5	6	11	125	—	—	—	—	—
1999–00	HC Kladno	Czech	2	0	0	0	0	—	—	—	—	—
2000–01	HC Kladno U20	Czech U20	47	4	14	18	95	—	—	—	—	—
2000–01	HC Kladno	Czech	1	0	0	0	0	—	—	—	—	—
2000–01	HK Slany	Czech3	1	0	0	0	0	—	—	—	—	—
2000–01	HC Mladá Boleslav	Czech3	—	—	—	—	—	4	0	0	0	29
2001–02	HC Kladno	Czech	4	0	0	0	4	—	—	—	—	—
2001–02	HC Berounsti Medvedi	Czech2	39	1	2	3	50	—	—	—	—	—
2001–02	HC Prostějov	Czech2	2	0	1	1	0	—	—	—	—	—
2002–03	HC Kladno U20	Czech U20	8	0	1	1	12	10	3	4	7	20
2002–03	HC Kladno	Czech2	36	4	4	8	34	5	0	0	0	0
2003–04	HC Kladno	Czech	51	1	3	4	66	—	—	—	—	—
2003–04	HK Slany	Czech3	3	1	4	5	2	—	—	—	—	—
2004–05	HC Kladno	Czech	46	0	4	4	50	7	0	0	0	43
2005–06	HC Kladno	Czech	49	5	7	12	80	—	—	—	—	—
2006–07	HC Kladno	Czech	48	4	5	9	91	3	0	0	0	2
2007–08	HC Slovan Ústečtí Lvi	Czech	47	2	2	4	65	—	—	—	—	—
2008–09	HC Slovan Ústečtí Lvi	Czech2	46	4	5	9	26	11	2	3	5	12
2009–10	HC Slovan Ústečtí Lvi	Czech2	45	5	10	15	53	15	3	5	8	12
2010–11	HC Slovan Ústečtí Lvi	Czech2	20	3	3	6	18	—	—	—	—	—
2010–11	HC Kladno	Czech	6	0	0	0	2	—	—	—	—	—
2011–12	HC Slovan Ústečtí Lvi	Czech2	39	7	15	22	38	16	1	7	8	14
2012–13	HC Litvínov	Czech	39	1	3	4	38	6	0	0	0	6
2012–13	HC Slovan Ústečtí Lvi	Czech2	2	0	0	0	0	—	—	—	—	—
2013–14	HC Litvínov	Czech	37	2	4	6	26	—	—	—	—	—
2014–15	HC Litvínov	Czech	30	2	5	7	28	—	—	—	—	—
2014–15	Rytíři Kladno	Czech2	11	0	4	4	14	7	0	1	1	6
2015–16	HC Most	Czech2	43	3	14	17	54	—	—	—	—	—
Czech totals			360	17	33	50	450	16	0	0	0	51
Czech2 totals			283	27	58	85	287	54	6	16	22	44
