= Edward J. Zeman =

American politician

Edward J. Zeman (June 8, 1905 – May 21, 1966) was an American politician.

Zeman was born in Chicago, Illinois. He worked for Livestock Press and for the city of Chicago. Zeman served in the Illinois House of Representatives in 1945 and 1946 and in the Illinois Senate from 1947 until 1951. He was a Democrat. Zeman died suddenly at his summer home in Linn, Wisconsin, Walworth County, Wisconsin.
