= Jan Polák (footballer, born 1989) =

Czech footballer (born 1989)

Personal information
- Date of birth: 26 March 1989 (age 37)
- Place of birth: Liberec, Czechoslovakia
- Height: 1.88 m (6 ft 2 in)
- Position: Centre-back

Youth career
- Slovan Liberec

Senior career*
Years	Team	Apps	(Gls)
2007–2012	Slovan Liberec	58	(1)
2009	→ Viktoria Plzeň (loan)	1	(0)
2010–2011	→ Ústí nad Labem (loan)	26	(0)
2012–2014	Piast Gliwice	57	(1)
2014–2016	Juve Stabia	52	(2)
2016–2017	Cremonese	15	(0)
2017	Slovan Liberec	0	(0)
2017–2018	Casertana	37	(0)
2019	Teramo	16	(0)
2019–2021	Südtirol	37	(0)

International career
2004–2005	Czech Republic U16	12	(0)
2005–2006	Czech Republic U17	20	(0)
2006	Czech Republic U18	6	(0)
2007–2008	Czech Republic U19	17	(0)
2008	Czech Republic U21	1	(0)
Medal record
Men's football
Representing Czech Republic
UEFA European Under-17 Championship
Runner-up	2006 Luxembourg
- * Club domestic league appearances and goals

Jan Polák (born 26 March 1989) is a Czech former professional footballer who played as a centre-back.

== Playing career ==
Polak joined Polish first division club Piast Gliwice in August 2012 and played with them for two seasons.

In September 2014, he was confirmed as having been signed by Italian Lega Pro (third division) outfit Juve Stabia on a free transfer. In the summer of 2016 accords with Cremonese.

In early 2017, he returned to Slovan Liberec.

On 24 January 2019, he signed with Serie C club Teramo.

On 15 July 2019, he signed a two-year contract with Südtirol. He left the club at the end of 2020–2021 season.

== Honours ==
Slovan Liberec

- Czech First League: 2011–12
