= Petr Zábojník =

Czech footballer (born 1980)

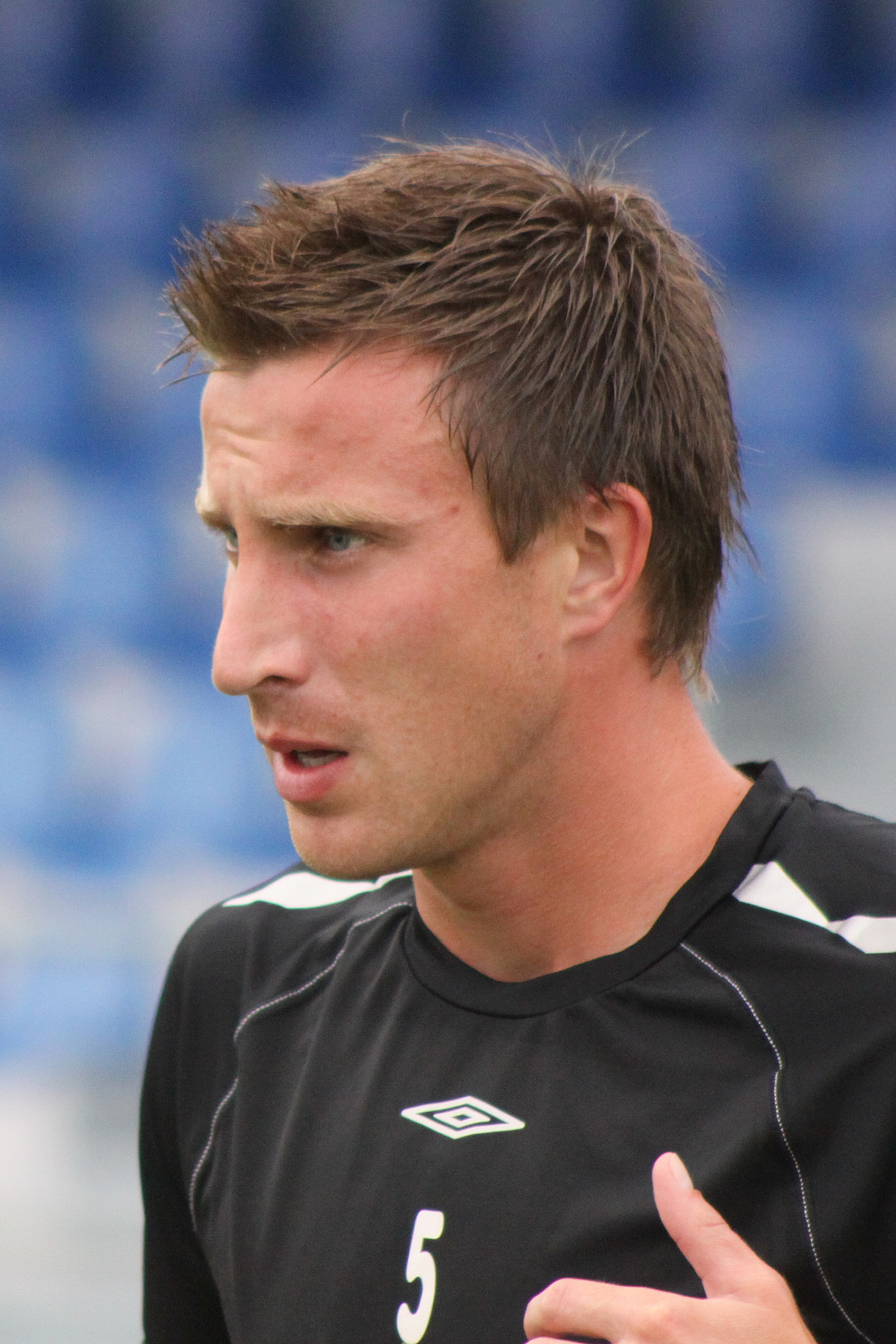

Personal information
- Date of birth: 3 October 1980 (age 46)
- Place of birth: Liberec, Czechoslovakia
- Height: 1.85 m (6 ft 1 in)
- Position: Defender

Youth career
- 1986–2000: Slovan Liberec

Senior career*
Years	Team	Apps	(Gls)
2000–2001	FC Slovan Liberec	1	(0)
2001–2002	Spolana Neratovice	21	(1)
2002–2005	FK SIAD Most	72	(7)
2005	SK Slavia Prague	10	(0)
2006–2012	FK Jablonec	113	(5)
- * Club domestic league appearances and goals as of 15 May 2011

Petr Zábojník (born 3 October 1980 in Liberec) is a Czech footballer. He formerly played for FK Jablonec 97 for 6 seasons.

Zábojník played for Jablonec as the club was eliminated in the qualifying rounds of the 2007–08 UEFA Cup and 2010–11 UEFA Europa League.
