= Pavel Macháček =

Czech footballer

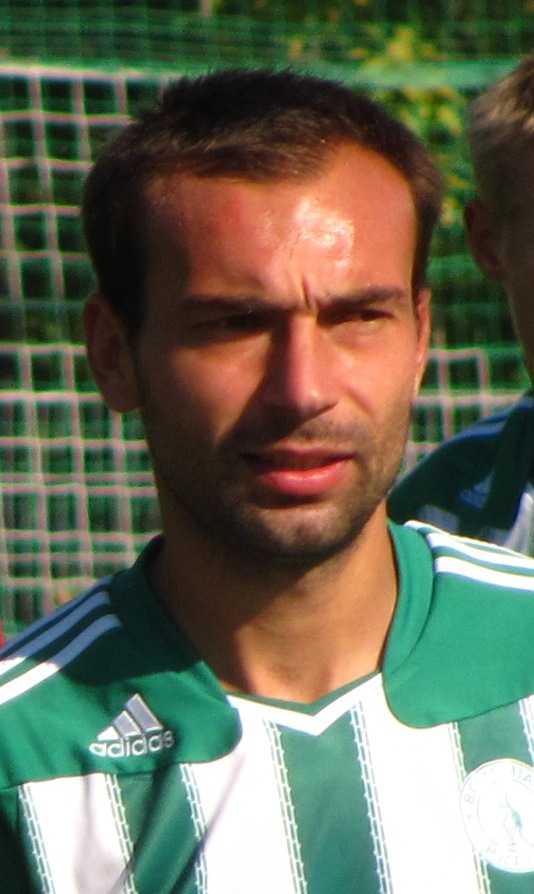

Personal information
- Date of birth: 18 December 1977 (age 48)
- Place of birth: Czechoslovakia
- Height: 1.85 m (6 ft 1 in)
- Position: Defender

Team information
- Current team: FK Bohemians Prague (Střížkov)
- Number: 2

Senior career*
Years	Team	Apps	(Gls)
2004	Bohemians 1905		
2004–2006	→ AS Pardubice (loan)		
2006–	Bohemians Prague	50	(4)
- * Club domestic league appearances and goals as of 30 June 2012

Pavel Macháček (born 18 December 1977) is a Czech football defender currently playing for FK Bohemians Prague (Střížkov) in the Czech Republic.

== Career statistics ==
Club	Season	League		Cup		Other		Total	
Club	Season	Apps	Goals	Apps	Goals	Apps	Goals	Apps	Goals
Bohemians Prague	2008–09	25	3	0	0	0	0	25	3
Bohemians Prague	2009–10	25	1	0	0	0	0	25	1
Bohemians Prague	2010–11	?	?	0	0	0	0	?	?
Bohemians Prague	2011–12	25	4	0	0	0	0	25	4
Bohemians Prague	Total	75	8	0	0	0	0	75	8
Career total		75	8	0	0	0	0	75	8

Statistics accurate as of 30 June 2012
