= Tomáš Strnad =

Czech footballer

Personal information
- Full name: Tomáš Strnad
- Date of birth: 8 December 1980 (age 45)
- Place of birth: Czechoslovakia
- Height: 1.85 m (6 ft 1 in)
- Position: Defensive midfielder

Youth career
- Slavia Prague

Senior career*
Years	Team	Apps	(Gls)
2001–2003	Radotín	?	(?)
2003–2005	Bohemians 1905	4	(0)
2005–2010	Kladno	77	(2)
2007–2008	Banská Bystrica	15	(0)
2010–2012	Senica	49	(3)
2012–2013	Hradec Králové	21	(0)
- * Club domestic league appearances and goals as of 30 June 2013

Tomáš Strnad (born 8 December 1980) is a retired Czech football midfielder who last played for FC Hradec Králové.
