= Jiří Perůtka =

Czech footballer

Personal information
- Date of birth: 22 February 1988 (age 38)
- Place of birth: Czechoslovakia
- Height: 1.83 m (6 ft 0 in)
- Position: Midfielder

Team information
- Current team: Slovácko
- Number: 15

Senior career*
| Years | Team | Apps | (Gls) |
| 2008– | Slovácko | 30 | (0) |
| 2012 | → Karviná (loan) | | |
- * Club domestic league appearances and goals as of 31 December 2011

Jiří Perůtka (born 22 February 1988) is a Czech football player who currently plays for Slovácko.
