= Michal Zeman =

Czech footballer (born 1984)

Personal information
- Date of birth: 18 August 1984 (age 42)
- Place of birth: Czechoslovakia
- Position: Defender

Senior career*
Years	Team	Apps	(Gls)
2009–2011	FC Slovan Liberec	11	(0)
2011–2018	FK Ústí nad Labem	178	(21)
2018–2024	SK Brná		
- * Club domestic league appearances and goals

Michal Zeman (born 18 August 1984) is a Czech former football defender who played in the Czech First League for FC Slovan Liberec, as well as in the Czech second tier for FK Ústí nad Labem.
