= Lukáš Vácha =

Czech footballer

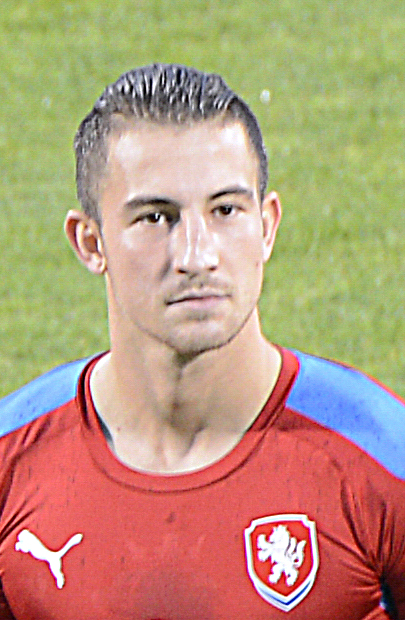
- Vácha with Czech Republic in 2014

Personal information
- Full name: Lukáš Vácha
- Date of birth: 13 May 1989 (age 37)
- Place of birth: Prague, Czechoslovakia
- Height: 1.73 m (5 ft 8 in)
- Position: Defensive midfielder

Team information
- Current team: Hradec Králové (development coach)

Youth career
- 1994–2006: Slavia Prague

Senior career*
Years	Team	Apps	(Gls)
2006–2009	Slavia Prague	1	(0)
2007	→ Jablonec (loan)	10	(0)
2008	→ Slovan Liberec (loan)	0	(0)
2009	→ Baník Ostrava (loan)	8	(0)
2009–2012	Slovan Liberec	79	(4)
2013–2019	Sparta Prague	101	(6)
2017	→ Slovan Liberec (loan)	3	(0)
2019–2023	Sparta Prague B	29	(2)

International career
2004–2007	Czech Republic U16	8	(2)
2005–2006	Czech Republic U17	19	(4)
2006–2007	Czech Republic U19	17	(2)
2009–2011	Czech Republic U21	20	(1)
2014–2015	Czech Republic	8	(0)

Managerial career
- 2022–2023: Sparta Prague B (assistant)
- 2024–2026: Hradec Králové (assistant)
- 2026–: Hradec Králové (development coach)
Medal record
Men's football
Representing Czech Republic
UEFA European Under-17 Championship
Runner-up	2006 Luxembourg
- * Club domestic league appearances and goals as of 10:51, 11 May 2023 (UTC)~

Lukáš Vácha (born 13 May 1989) is a former Czech professional footballer who last played as a midfielder for AC Sparta Prague B.

== Club career ==
Vácha moved to AC Sparta Prague from FC Slovan Liberec in 2013. He won the Czech double with AC Sparta Prague by winning both the Czech First League and the Czech Cup in the 2013–14 season.

Ahead of the 2019–20 season, Vácha was relegated to AC Sparta Prague B, the reserve team of AC Sparta Prague.

== International career ==
A member of the Czech under-21 team, Vácha represented them at the 2011 UEFA European Under-21 Football Championship. He debuted for Czech Republic on 21 May 2014 in a friendly match against Finland.

=== International career statistics ===
Czech Republic national team
Year	Apps	Goals
2014	6	0
2015	2	0
Total	8	0

== Controversy ==
In October 2016, his club ordered him to train with their women's team for stating "to the stove" in reaction to a decision against him by a female assistant referee, Lucie Ratajová.

On 3 November 2024, according to Slavia team manager Stanislav Vlček, assistant of Hradec Králové Vácha shouted in the home draw 1–1 with Slavia Prague on Slavia player Ondřej Lingr "Cikáne!" ("Gypsy!"). Vácha and the club later apologized. He was banned by the Disciplinary commission FAČR for two months and fined 40,000 Czech crowns.
