= Marcel Gecov =

Czech footballer

Personal information
- Full name: Marcel Gecov
- Date of birth: 1 January 1988 (age 38)
- Place of birth: Prague, Czechoslovakia
- Height: 1.80 m (5 ft 11 in)
- Position: Midfielder

Youth career
- 1994–2005: Slavia Prague

Senior career*
Years	Team	Apps	(Gls)
2005–2008	Slavia Prague	0	(0)
2007	→ Kladno (loan)	17	(1)
2008–2011	Slovan Liberec	62	(2)
2011–2012	Fulham	2	(0)
2012	Gent	7	(0)
2013–2014	Slavia Prague	43	(3)
2015	Rapid București	17	(3)
2015–2016	Śląsk Wrocław	23	(0)
Total		172	(9)

International career
2005	Czech Republic U17	2	(0)
2005	Czech Republic U18	5	(0)
2005–2007	Czech Republic U19	21	(0)
2007	Czech Republic U20	9	(0)
2008–2011	Czech Republic U21	18	(1)
2011	Czech Republic	1	(0)
Medal record
Men's football
Representing Czech Republic
FIFA U-20 World Cup
Runner-up	2007 Canada
- * Club domestic league appearances and goals

Marcel Gecov (born 1 January 1988) is a Czech former professional footballer who played as a midfielder.

== Club career ==
Gecov began his club career with Slavia Prague at the age of six. The young midfielder went through all the youth teams of Slavia. He was 17 years old when he was promoted to the A-team. Gecov did not get a chance to make his debut in the Gambrinus liga for Slavia. In January 2007, Gecov was sent to SK Kladno on loan for the rest of the season.

Gecov made his debut in the Czech top flight in March 2007 against Tescoma Zlín. He started seventeen times for Kladno and scored one goal. In January 2008 Gecov signed a long-term contract lasting 3 1/2 years with FC Slovan Liberec.

On 20 July 2011, Fulham announced the signing of Gecov on a two-year deal for an undisclosed fee. Gecov made his Fulham debut on Wednesday, 21 September in the League Cup against Chelsea at Stamford Bridge and he made his Premier League debut against Liverpool on 5 December 2011 at Craven Cottage.

On 23 July 2012, Gent signed Gecov from Fulham for an undisclosed fee, but only a few months later he was deemed surplus and Gent accepted an undisclosed fee from his ex-club Slavia Prague.

On 6 July 2015, Gecov joined Polish club Śląsk Wrocław.

== National team ==
Gecov has represented his country at all age levels. He was also a part of the Czech squad at the 2007 FIFA U-20 World Cup in Canada where he played six matches and helped the team to its second place. He represented Czech Republic under–21s at the 2011 UEFA European Under-21 Football Championship and was named in the team of the tournament. Gecov made his debut for the senior side on 10 August 2011 as a starter in the 0–3 loss against Norway in a friendly match.

== Honours ==
Czech Republic U21

- FIFA U-20 World Cup runner-up: 2007
