= Jiří Liška (footballer) =

Czech footballer and coach (born 1982)

Personal information
- Full name: Jiří Liška
- Date of birth: 13 March 1982 (age 44)
- Place of birth: Olomouc, Czechoslovakia
- Height: 1.76 m (5 ft 9 1/2 in)
- Position: Defender

Team information
- Current team: Oberlausitz Neugersdorf (assistant)

Senior career*
Years	Team	Apps	(Gls)
2000–2003	LeRK Prostějov	49	(2)
2003–2006	Vysočina Jihlava	66	(0)
2006–2012	Slovan Liberec	53	(0)
2008	→ FC ViOn Zlaté Moravce (loan)	11	(0)
2012–2015	Oberlausitz Neugersdorf	30	(5)

Managerial career
- 2016–: Oberlausitz Neugersdorf (assistant)
- * Club domestic league appearances and goals

Jiří Liška (born 13 March 1982) is a retired Czech football defender and current football coach. He is currently the assistant manager of Oberlausitz Neugersdorf.
