= Petr Papoušek =

Czech footballer

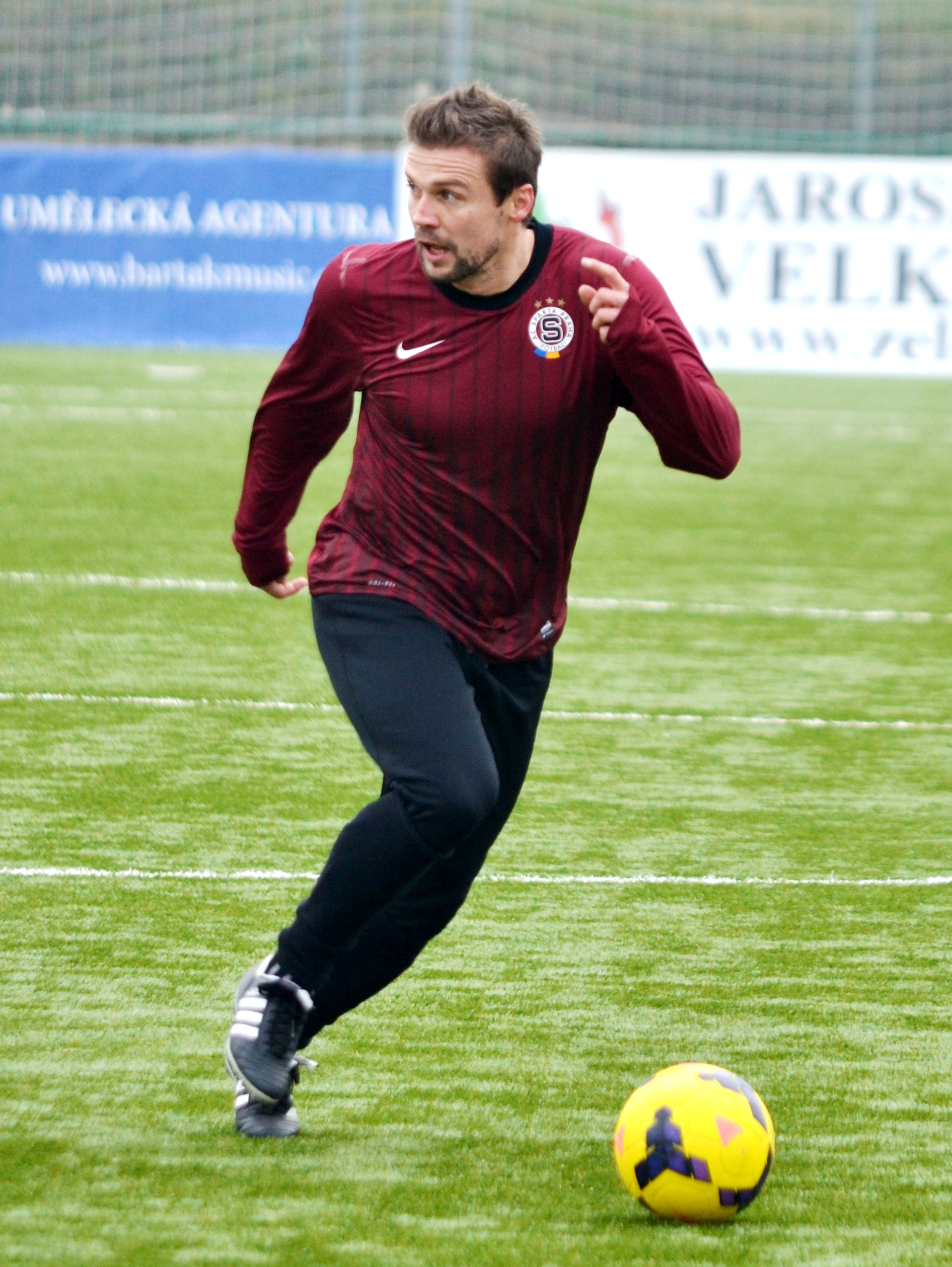

Personal information
- Date of birth: 7 May 1977 (age 49)
- Place of birth: Čáslav, Czechoslovakia
- Height: 1.74 m (5 ft 9 in)
- Position: Midfielder

Team information
- Current team: Viktoria Žižkov (assistant)

Youth career
- 1983–1991: TJ Slavoj Vrdy
- 1991–1995: Mladá Boleslav

Senior career*
Years	Team	Apps	(Gls)
1995–1997	Dukla Příbram	9	(5)
1997–2001	Sparta Prague	56	(5)
1999–2000	→ Jablonec 97 (loan)	23	(2)
2002	Baník Ostrava	5	(0)
2002–2011	Slovan Liberec	218	(24)
Total		311	(36)

International career
1998–1999	Czech Republic U21	5	(0)

Managerial career
- Čadca (U-19)
- Slovan Liberec (youth)
- –2021: Slovan Liberec B
- 2021–2024: Varnsdorf (assistant)
- 2025: Varnsdorf
- 2025: Chrudim
- 2026–: Viktoria Žižkov (assistant)
- * Club domestic league appearances and goals as of 18 June 2011

Petr Papoušek (born 7 May 1977 in Čáslav) is a Czech football coach and former player. He played as a midfielder and was one of the key players for the Czech First League side Slovan Liberec.

In June 2021, Papoušek was appointed as an assistant in Czech National Football League club Varnsdorf.

On 8 January 2025, Papoušek was appointed as manager of Czech National Football League club Varnsdorf.

On 16 June 2025, Papoušek was appointed as manager of Czech National Football League club Chrudim.
