= Stadion u Nisy =

Football stadium in Liberec, Czech Republic

Stadion U Nisy
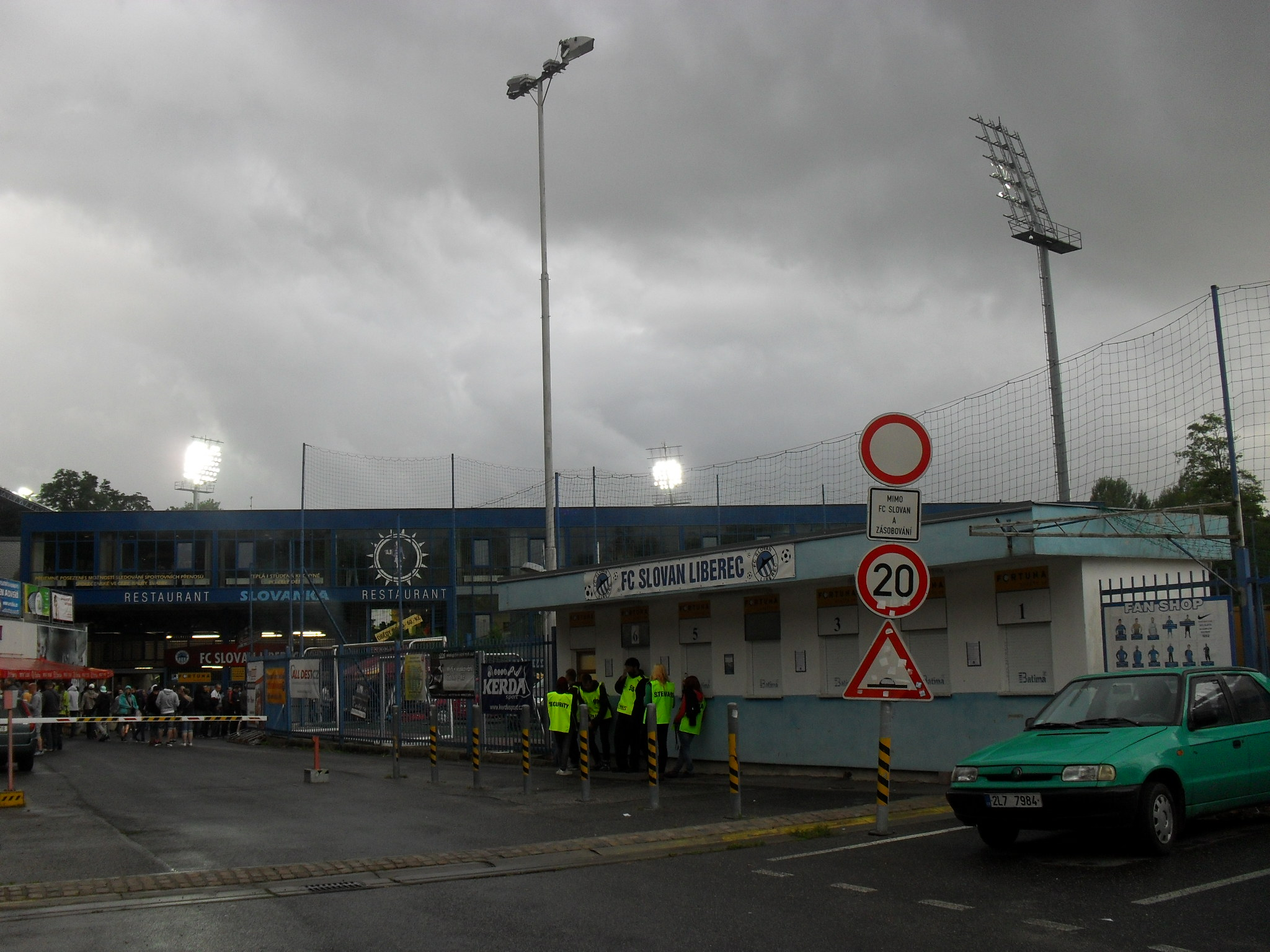
- Interactive map of Stadion U Nisy
- Location: Na Hradbách 1300, Liberec, Czech Republic, 460 01
- Coordinates: 50°46′34″N 15°03′00″E
- Owner: FC Slovan Liberec a.s
- Capacity: 9,900
- Surface: Grass
- Field size: 105 metres (115 yd) x 68 metres (74 yd)

Construction
- Built: 1933
- Renovated: 1995 and 2001

Tenant
- Slovan Liberec

Stadion u Nisy is an all-seater football stadium in Liberec. The stadium is home to Czech football club Slovan Liberec and occasionally hosts matches of the Czech Republic national team. The stadium is named after the river Nisa, flowing directly behind the North Stand. Another interesting fact about the stadium, the oldest Grandstand is embedded to a rock. The capacity is 9,900 seats.

== History ==
The stadium was built in 1933 and used for football matches of several Liberec sport clubs, the forerunners of today's Slovan Liberec. The field had a small wooden stand that time. Slovan did not use the stadium until 1978, before the club played on Městský (Municipal) stadium on the other side of Liberec. The original capacity was 5,000 spectators but after renovation work in 1995, capacity was increased to 7,000. In 1998, a lawn heating system was installed and a couple of months later, construction began on the North Stand. In 2000, Slovan Liberec installed floodlights due to a UEFA Cup match scheduled against Liverpool. Construction on the North Stand was completed in 2001.

== International matches ==
The Stadion u Nisy has hosted three competitive matches of the Czech national team and one friendly match.

4 June 2005

Czech Republic	8–1	Andorra
Lokvenc 12', 90+2'; Koller 30'; Šmicer 37'; Galásek 52'; Baroš 79'; Rosický 84'; Polák 86'	Report	Riera 36'

2006 FIFA World Cup qualification (UEFA)
Attendance: 9,520
Referee: Selçuk Dereli (Turkey)

7 October 2006

Czech Republic	7–0	San Marino
Kulič 15'; Polák 22'; Baroš 32', 68'; Koller 42', 52'; Jarolím 49'	Report

UEFA Euro 2008 qualifying
Attendance: 9,514
Referee: Vusal Aliyev (Azerbaijan)

28 March 2007

Czech Republic	1–0	Cyprus
Kováč 22'	Report

UEFA Euro 2008 qualifying
Attendance: 9,310
Referee: Ivan Bebek (Croatia)

11 August 2010

Czech Republic	4–1	Latvia
Bednář 49'; Fenin 54'; Pospěch 74'; Necid 77'	Report	Cauņa 90+2'

International Challenge Match
Attendance: 7,456
Referee: Sergij Dankovskyj (Ukraine)
