= Jakub Vojta (footballer) =

Czech footballer

Personal information
- Full name: Jakub Vojta
- Date of birth: 19 April 1991 (age 35)
- Place of birth: Czechoslovakia
- Position: Midfielder

Youth career
- Slovan Liberec

Senior career*
Years	Team	Apps	(Gls)
2009–2012	Slovan Liberec	14	(0)
2011–2012	→ Vlašim (loan)	17	(1)
2012	Bohemians Prague	4	(1)
2013	→ Most (loan)	13	(2)
2013–2014	Most	22	(2)
2014–2015	Vlašim	2	(0)
2015	Pommern Greifswald	28	(4)
2015–2016	ZFC Meuselwitz	13	(1)
2016–2018	FC Weesen		
2019–2020	Motorlet Prague		
2022–2023	Sparta Kolín		
- * Club domestic league appearances and goals

Jakub Vojta (born 19 April 1991) is a Czech former football midfielder. He played 14 games in the Czech First League for Slovan Liberec between 2010 and 2011.
