= Andrej Kerić =

Croatian footballer (born 1986)

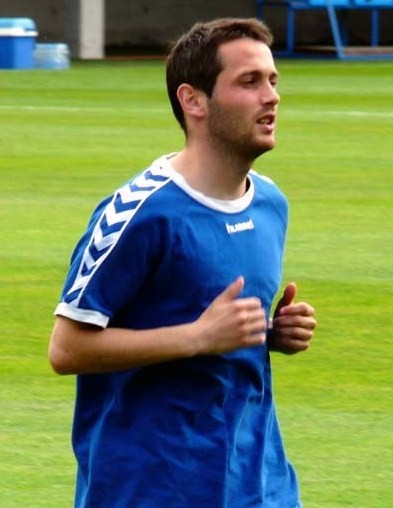
- Kerić in 2009

Personal information
- Date of birth: 11 February 1986 (age 40)
- Place of birth: Vinkovci, SR Croatia, Yugoslavia
- Height: 1.73 m (5 ft 8 in)
- Position: Striker

Youth career
- 1996–1999: Slavonac Komletinci
- 1999–2000: Otok
- 2000–2003: Cibalia

Senior career*
Years	Team	Apps	(Gls)
2003–2007	Cibalia	64	(9)
2008–2011	Slovan Liberec	81	(32)
2011–2014	Sparta Prague	28	(3)
2011	→ Teplice (loan)	10	(1)
2012–2013	→ Teplice (loan)	16	(0)
2013–2014	Sparta Prague B		
2014–2015	F91 Dudelange	19	(8)
2015	Zemplín Michalovce	4	(0)
2016	United Victory		
2017	Victory		
2017	→ Maziya (loan)		
2018	Istra 1961	8	(0)
2018	United Victory		
2018–2020	Cibalia	11	(0)
2020	Slavonac Komletinci		

International career
2006	Croatia U21	3	(0)

Managerial career
- 2022–: Cibalia (assistant)
- * Club domestic league appearances and goals

Andrej Kerić (born 11 February 1986) is a Croatian former professional footballer who played as a striker.

== Club career ==
Kerić started his career in the town of Vinkovci by the local side Cibalia. In the 2003–04 season Kerić first appeared in the first squad of Cibalia. In four seasons at Cibalia, Kerić scored 9 goals in 64 matches.

In February 2008 he signed a three-and-a-half-year contract with Czech club Slovan Liberec. Kerić soon became one of the most valuable players at Liberec. He scored six goals and helped the team to sixth place in the final league standings. Kerić scored 15 goals in the 2008–09 season and became the top scorer of the league.

On 29 January 2011, he signed for Sparta Prague.

In 2014, Kerić joined F91 Dudelange of Luxemburg.
