= Radek Dejmek =

Czech footballer (born 1988)

Personal information
- Date of birth: 2 February 1988 (age 38)
- Place of birth: Vrchlabí, Czechoslovakia
- Height: 1.81 m (5 ft 11 in)
- Position: Defender

Youth career
- 1990–2000: FC Vrchlabí
- 2000–2003: Jablonec
- 2003–2006: Slavia Prague

Senior career*
Years	Team	Apps	(Gls)
2006–2007	Slavia Prague	0	(0)
2007–2012	Slovan Liberec	51	(3)
2008	→ Sparta Krč (loan)		
2011–2012	→ Oud-Heverlee Leuven (loan)	22	(2)
2012–2013	1. FK Příbram	16	(1)
2013–2018	Korona Kielce	133	(8)
2018	Pafos	4	(0)
2019–2020	GKS Katowice	26	(1)

International career
2005	Czech Republic U18	6	(2)
2010	Czech Republic U21	1	(0)

Managerial career
- 2021–: Slovan Liberec (U15)
- * Club domestic league appearances and goals

Radek Dejmek (born 2 February 1988) is a Czech former footballer who played as defender. He is currently managing the under-15 side of Slovan Liberec.

== Career ==
Dejmek started his career with Slavia Prague.
