= Miroslav Holeňák =

Czech footballer

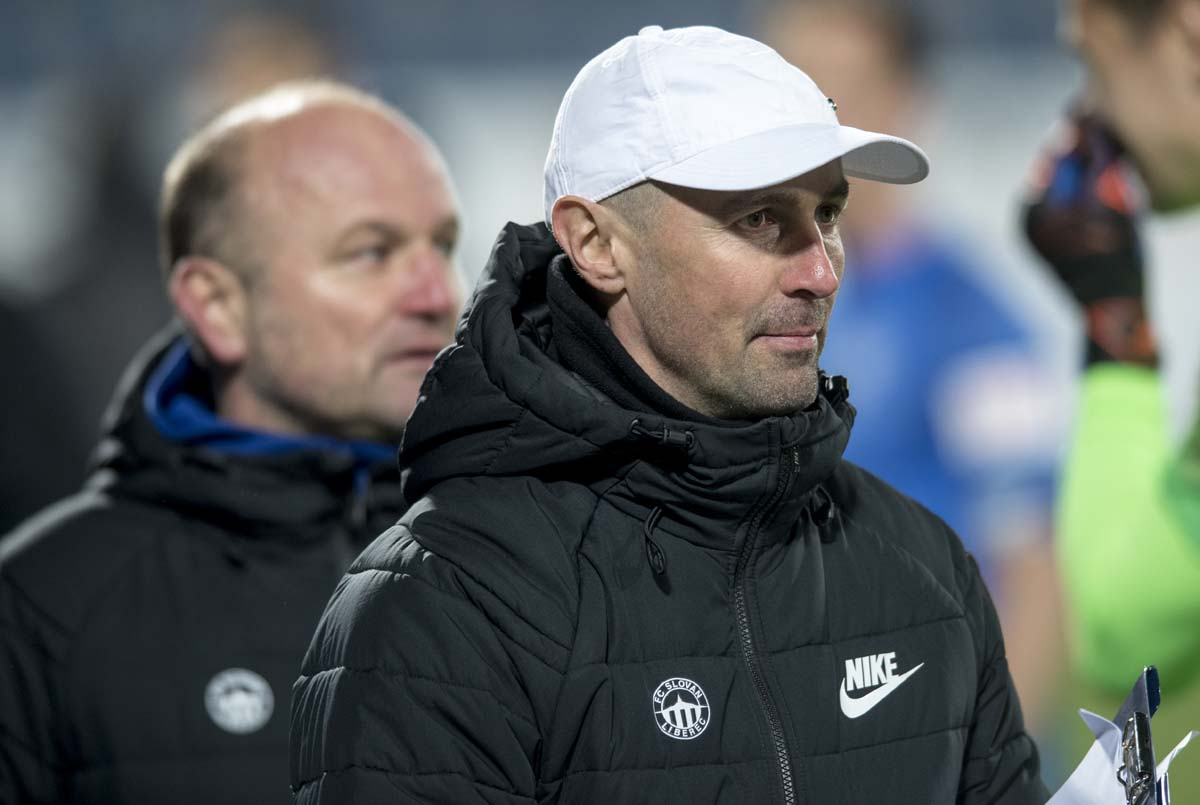

Personal information
- Date of birth: 10 February 1976 (age 50)
- Place of birth: Zlín, Czechoslovakia
- Height: 1.80 m (5 ft 11 in)
- Positions: Central defender; midfielder

Team information
- Current team: Slovan Liberec (assistant)

Senior career*
Years	Team	Apps	(Gls)
1993–1996	FC Zlín	64	(1)
1996–2000	Petra Drnovice	117	(14)
2001–2004	Slovan Liberec	94	(2)
2004–2006	Slavia Prague	39	(3)
2006–2007	SV Mattersburg	32	(2)
2007–2011	Slovan Liberec	90	(1)
Total		436	(23)

International career
1994–1997	Czech Republic U21	11	(2)
2002–2003	Czech Republic	3	(0)

Managerial career
- 2011–2016: Slovan Liberec (youth)
- 2016–2017: Slovan Liberec B (assistant)
- 2017: Slovan Liberec B
- 2018–2022: Slovan Liberec (assistant)
- 2022–2024: Varnsdorf
- 2024–: Slovan Liberec (assistant)
- * Club domestic league appearances and goals

Miroslav Holeňák (born 10 February 1976) is a retired Czech footballer. He played mostly as defender but was also capable of playing in midfield.

== Club career ==
Miroslav Holeňák began with football at the age of eight in his hometown Zlín, going on to make his professional debut as a midfielder in the 1993–94 season. Holeňák quickly became a starting player and three years later transferred to Petra Drnovice. After four years in Moravia Holeňák moved to Slovan Liberec for 14 million Czech crowns. Converted to a central defender, he went on to make a major contribution as the team secured the 2001–02 league title and was called up to the Czech national team. At the end of the 2002–03 season, it had appeared as though he would move to Sparta Prague, before he ultimately opted for a transfer to their rivals Slavia.

After the expiration of his contract Holeňák left the Czech First League and joined the Austrian Bundesliga team SV Mattersburg. Only one year later Holeňák returned to the Czech Republic and again signed with FC Slovan Liberec.

== International career ==
Holeňák debuted for the Czech national team on 27 March 2002 in a 0–0 draw against Wales in Cardiff. His second start came in April of the same year in Ioannina against Greece. His last match was a 4–1 victory against Slovakia in August 2002. He was included in the squad for the match against Austria on 11 October 2003 but did not start.

== Coaching career ==
In 2022, Holeňák was appointed as manager by Czech National Football League club Varnsdorf.
