= Jan Blažek =

Czech footballer (born 1988)

Personal information
- Date of birth: 20 March 1988 (age 38)
- Place of birth: Trutnov, Czechoslovakia
- Height: 1.81 m (5 ft 11 in)
- Position: Forward

Team information
- Current team: TJ Slavoj Veleň

Youth career
- 1998–1999: FK Trutnov
- 1999–2000: SK Hradec Králové
- 2000–2002: FK Trutnov
- 2002–2005: Slovan Liberec

Senior career*
Years	Team	Apps	(Gls)
2005–2013	Slovan Liberec	93	(23)
2008	→ Slavia Prague (loan)	7	(1)
2008–2011	→ AEL (loan)	35	(3)
2011–2012	→ Slavia Prague (loan)	14	(2)
2013–2014	Apollon Smyrnis	5	(0)
2014	Podbeskidzie Bielsko-Biała	5	(1)
2014	Podbeskidzie II	1	(0)
2014–2015	Aiginiakos	2	(0)
2015	Dukla Prague	8	(0)
2015–2016	Slavoj Vyšehrad	0	(0)
2016	BV Cloppenburg	5	(0)
2016	MFK Frýdek-Místek	2	(0)
2017–2018	Litoměřicko	6	(0)
2018	TJ Vyšehořovice		
2018–2019	SK Úvaly		
2019	SK Union Vršovice		
2019–2021	TJ Spoje Praha		
2021	FK Zbuzany	1	(0)
2021–2022	SV Neukirchen	8	(0)
2022–2023	FC Horky nad Jizerou		
2023	TJ Baník Žacléř		
2023–	TJ Slavoj Veleň		

International career
2004	Czech Republic U16	3	(1)
2004–2005	Czech Republic U17	16	(10)
2005	Czech Republic U18	1	(0)
2005–2007	Czech Republic U19	18	(6)
2006–2008	Czech Republic U21	5	(0)
2009–2010	Czech Republic	3	(0)
- * Club domestic league appearances and goals as of 22 November 2023

Jan Blažek (born 20 March 1988) is a Czech footballer who plays as a forward for TJ Slavoj Veleň.

Blažek is known as a very talented as well as a somewhat controversial player, due to his conflicts with coaches and alcohol consumption. On his web site he stated his motto: Děvky, chlast a prcání (hookers, booze and fucking). The site also included many photographs of him drinking rum with cola. After Blažek's transfer to Slavia, the web site gained some attention of the media, resulting in motto being changed to věř v sám sebe (trust in yourself) and the controversial photographs were removed.

In July 2011 Blažek returned to his mother club FC Slovan Liberec. On 24 July 2012, Blažek scored a goal against Kazakhstani club Shakhter Karagandy at the very end of the period of extra time to level the result at 1–1 and enable his team to progress to the next round of the UEFA Champions League by an aggregate score of 2–1. He spent time at Greek second division side Aiginiakos in the autumn part of the 2014–15 season, before joining FK Dukla Prague on loan in February 2015.

== International career ==
On 15 November 2009, Blažek made his first appearance for the national team in a friendly game against United Arab Emirates.
