= Lovre Vulin =

Croatian footballer (born 1984)

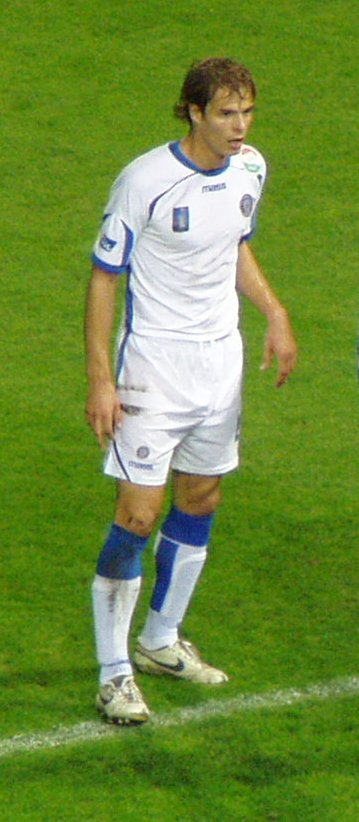

Personal information
- Date of birth: 2 September 1984 (age 42)
- Place of birth: Pakoštane, SFR Yugoslavia
- Height: 1.88 m (6 ft 2 in)
- Positions: Left back; centre back

Youth career
- Pakoštane
- Zadar
- 1999–2003: Hajduk Split

Senior career*
Years	Team	Apps	(Gls)
2002–2005	Hajduk Split	0	(0)
2003–2004	→ Novalja (loan)	13	(1)
2004–2005	→ Mosor (loan)	26	(4)
2006	Standard Liége	1	(1)
2006–2007	Carl Zeiss Jena	0	(0)
2007–2008	Zalaegerszeg	21	(1)
2008–2011	Slovan Liberec	41	(4)
2011	→ České Budějovice (loan)	15	(1)
2012	Kapfenberger SV	7	(0)
2014–	Pakoštane	11	(3)

International career^{‡}
2004	Croatia U20	3	(0)
2000	Croatia U21	1	(0)
- * Club domestic league appearances and goals as of 9 January 2015 ‡ National team caps and goals as of 9 January 2015

Lovre Vulin (born 2 September 1984) is a Croatian footballer who plays as a defender who is currently playing for NK Pakoštane.

== Career ==
Vulin started his career with Croatia's Hajduk Split before moving to Standard Liège in 2006. He had a short spell at Austrian Bundesliga side Kapfenberger SV in 2012.
