= 2009–10 AS Roma season =

Roma
2009–10 season
- President: Rosella Sensi
- Manager: Luciano Spalletti (until 1 September 2009); Claudio Ranieri (from 2 September 2009)
- Stadium: Stadio Olimpico
- Serie A: 2nd
- Coppa Italia: Runners-up
- UEFA Europa League: Round of 32
- Top goalscorer: League: Francesco Totti, Mirko Vučinić (14); All: Francesco Totti (25)
- Highest home attendance: 61,898 vs Internazionale (27 March 2010, Serie A)
- Lowest home attendance: 7,241 vs Triestina (12 January 2010, Coppa Italia)
- Average home league attendance: 40,975
Home colours	Away colours	Third colours

The 2009–10 season was Associazione Sportiva Roma's 77th season in Serie A. The club competed in Serie A, the Coppa Italia, and the UEFA Europa League. Roma finished second in Serie A with 80 points, two points behind Inter.

In the previous season, Roma achieved sixth place in Serie A and qualified for the 2009–10 UEFA Europa League starting from the third qualifying round.

== Players ==
=== Squad information ===
Last updated on 16 May 2010
Appearances include league matches only

No.	Name	Nat	Position(s)	Date of birth (Age at end of season)	Signed from	Signed in	Apps.	Goals
Goalkeepers
1	Bogdan Lobonț	(Romania)	GK	18 January 1978 (aged 32)	(Romania) Dinamo București	2009	2	0
25	Artur	(Brazil)	GK	25 January 1981 (aged 29)	(Italy) Siena	2008	12	0
27	Júlio Sérgio	(Brazil)	GK	8 November 1978 (aged 31)	(Brazil) América	2006	30	0
32	Doni	(Brazil)	GK	22 October 1979 (aged 30)	(Brazil) Juventude	2005	133	0
Defenders
3	Marco Andreolli	(Italy)	CB	10 June 1986 (aged 24)	(Italy) Internazionale	2009	8	0
4	Juan	(Brazil)	CB	1 February 1979 (aged 31)	(Germany) Bayer Leverkusen	2007	72	4
5	Philippe Mexès	(France)	CB	30 March 1982 (aged 28)	(France) Auxerre	2004	161	10
13	Marco Motta	(Italy)	RB	14 May 1986 (aged 24)	(Italy) Udinese	2009	29	0
17	John Arne Riise	(Norway)	LB	24 September 1980 (aged 29)	(England) Liverpool	2008	67	7
22	Max Tonetto	(Italy)	LB	18 November 1974 (aged 35)	(Italy) Sampdoria	2006	84	1
29	Nicolás Burdisso	(Argentina)	CB / RB	12 April 1981 (aged 29)	(Italy) Internazionale	2009	33	2
77	Marco Cassetti	(Italy)	RB	29 May 1977 (aged 33)	(Italy) Lecce	2006	104	4
87	Aleandro Rosi	(Italy)	RB	17 May 1987 (aged 23)	(Italy) Youth Sector	2004	53	3
Midfielders
7	David Pizarro	(Chile)	CM / DM	11 September 1979 (aged 30)	(Italy) Internazionale	2006	119	8
11	Rodrigo Taddei	(Brazil)	LM / RM / AM	6 March 1980 (aged 30)	(Italy) Siena	2005	154	22
14	Ricardo Faty	(France)	DM / CM	4 August 1986 (aged 23)	(France) Strasbourg	2006	19	0
16	Daniele De Rossi (Vice-Captain)	(Italy)	DM / CM	24 July 1983 (aged 26)	(Italy) Youth Sector	2001	221	27
20	Simone Perrotta	(Italy)	LM / CM / AM	17 September 1977 (aged 32)	(Italy) Chievo	2004	185	31
33	Matteo Brighi	(Italy)	CM	14 February 1981 (aged 29)	(Italy) Juventus	2004	83	8
39	Adrian Stoian	(Romania)	CM	11 February 1991 (aged 19)	(Romania) Școala de Fotbal Gheorghe Popescu	2008	1	0
Forwards
9	Mirko Vučinić	(Montenegro)	CF / ST	1 October 1983 (aged 26)	(Italy) Lecce	2006	119	36
10	Francesco Totti (Captain)	(Italy)	AM / LW / SS / CF / ST	27 September 1976 (aged 33)	(Italy) Youth Sector	1992	442	192
19	Júlio Baptista	(Brazil)	AM / CF / ST	1 October 1981 (aged 28)	(Spain) Real Madrid	2008	50	12
24	Alessio Cerci	(Italy)	RW / SS	23 July 1987 (aged 22)	(Italy) Youth Sector	2003	13	0
30	Luca Toni	(Italy)	CF / ST	26 May 1977 (aged 33)	(Germany) Bayern Munich	2010	15	5
41	Filippo Scardina	(Italy)	CF / ST	26 February 1992 (aged 18)	(Italy) Youth Sector	2009	1	0
42	Stefano Pettinari	(Italy)	CF / RW / LW	27 January 1992 (aged 18)	(Italy) Youth Sector	2009	1	0
94	Jérémy Ménez	(France)	ST / SS	7 May 1987 (aged 23)	(France) Monaco	2008	52	5
Players transferred during the season
2	Cicinho	(Brazil)	RB	24 June 1980 (aged 30)	(Spain) Real Madrid	2007	54	3
18	Mauro Esposito	(Italy)	RW	13 June 1979 (aged 31)	(Italy) Cagliari	2007	8	0
21	Stefano Guberti	(Italy)	CM	6 November 1984 (aged 25)	(Italy) Bari	2009	6	0
26	Adrian Piț	(Romania)	CM	16 July 1983 (aged 26)	(Switzerland) Bellinzona	2007	2	0
89	Stefano Okaka	(Italy)	CF / ST	9 August 1989 (aged 20)	(Italy) Youth Sector	2005	30	2

== Transfers ==
=== In ===
—	MF	GHA	Ahmed Barusso (end of loan from Rimini. Co-ownership renewed)
—	DF	ITA	Marco Andreolli (end of loan from Sassuolo)
—	DF	POR	Vitorino Antunes (end of loan from Lecce)
—	DF	ARG	Nicolás Burdisso (loan from Internazionale)
—	MF	ITA	Aleandro Rosi (end of loan from Livorno)
—	MF	ITA	Alessio Cerci (end of loan from Atalanta)
—	MF	ITA	Leandro Greco (end of loan from Pisa)
—	MF	ITA	Valerio Virga (end of loan from Novara)
—	MF	SEN	Ricardo Faty (end of loan from Nantes)
—	FW	ITA	Mauro Esposito (end of loan from Chievo)
—	MF	ITA	Stefano Guberti (acquired from Bari on a free transfer)
—	FW	ITA	Stefano Okaka (end of loan from Brescia)
—	GK	ROU	Bogdan Lobonț (on loan from Dinamo București)
—	FW	ITA	Fabio Zamblera (on loan from Newcastle United)
—	FW	ITA	Luca Toni (loan from Bayern Munich)
—	FW	SRI	Panushanth Kulenthiran (loan from Bellinzona)

=== Out ===
—	GK	ITA	Pietro Pipolo (free agent)
—	DF	ITA	Simone Loria (loaned to Torino)
—	DF	ITA	Christian Panucci (end of contract, to Parma)
—	DF	ITA	Dario Polverini (sold to Pro Patria)
—	MF	ITA	Andrea Giacomini (sold to Rimini)
—	MF	HON	Édgar Álvarez (sold to Bari)
—	MF	BRA	Filipe Gomes (end of contract, to Siena)
—	MF	ITA	Gianluca Galasso (sold to Bari. Co-ownership resolved)
—	FW	ITA	Vincenzo Montella (Retired)
—	MF	ITA	Marco D'Alessandro (loaned to Grosseto)
—	DF	ITA	Riccardo Brosco (loaned to Triestina)
—	MF	ITA	Alberto Aquilani (sold for €20 million to Liverpool)
—	MF	ITA	Valerio Virga (loaned to Cosenza)
—	DF	POR	Vitorino Antunes (loaned to Leixões)
—	MF	ITA	Leandro Greco (loaned to Piacenza)
—	MF	ITA	Stefano Guberti (loaned to Sampdoria)
—	MF	ITA	Mauro Esposito (loaned to Grosseto)
—	FW	ITA	Stefano Okaka (loaned to Fulham)
—	MF	ROU	Adrian Piț (loaned to Triestina)
—	DF	BRA	Cicinho (loaned to São Paulo)

== Competitions ==
=== Overall ===
Competition	Started round	Final position	First match	Last match
Serie A	Matchday 1	Runners-up	23 August 2009	16 May 2010
Coppa Italia	Round of 16	Runners-up	12 January 2010	5 May 2010
Europa League	Third qualifying round	Round of 32	30 July 2009	25 February 2010

Last updated: 16 May 2010

=== Serie A ===
==== League table ====
Pos	Team	Pld	W	D	L	GF	GA	GD	Pts	Qualification or relegation
1	Internazionale (C)	38	24	10	4	75	34	+41	82	Qualification to Champions League group stage
2	Roma	38	24	8	6	68	41	+27	80	Qualification to Champions League group stage
3	Milan	38	20	10	8	60	39	+21	70	Qualification to Champions League group stage
4	Sampdoria	38	19	10	9	49	41	+8	67	Qualification to Champions League play-off round
5	Palermo	38	18	11	9	59	47	+12	65	Qualification to Europa League play-off round

Source: Lega Calcio and Yahoo! Sport
Rules for classification: 1) points; 2) head-to-head points; 3) head-to-head goal difference; 4) head-to-head goals scored; 5) goal difference; 6) number of goals scored.
(C) Champions

==== Results summary ====
Overall								Home						Away					
Pld	W	D	L	GF	GA	GD	Pts	W	D	L	GF	GA	GD	W	D	L	GF	GA	GD
38	24	8	6	68	41	+27	80	15	1	3	36	17	+19	9	7	3	32	24	+8

Last updated: 16 May 2010.
Source: Competitive matches

==== Results by round ====
Round	1	2	3	4	5	6	7	8	9	10	11	12	13	14	15	16	17	18	19	20	21	22	23	24	25	26	27	28	29	30	31	32	33	34	35	36	37	38
Ground	A	H	A	H	A	A	H	A	H	A	H	A	H	A	H	A	H	A	H	H	A	H	A	H	H	A	H	A	H	A	H	A	H	A	H	A	H	A
Result	L	L	W	W	D	D	W	L	L	L	W	D	W	W	W	D	W	D	W	W	W	W	W	W	W	D	D	D	W	W	W	W	W	W	L	W	W	W
Position	15	20	14	11	9	9	8	11	12	14	14	13	11	9	6	5	4	5	5	3	3	3	3	3	3	3	3	3	3	2	2	2	1	1	2	2	2	2

Updated to match(es) played on 16 May 2010. Source: Competitive matches
A = Away; H = Home; W = Win; D = Draw; L = Loss

==== Matches ====
23 August 2009 1	Genoa	3–2	Roma	Genoa
20:45 CEST (UTC+02:00)	Modesto (yellow card) 32'; Zapater (yellow card) 40', (goal) 69'; Criscito 49'; Moretti (yellow card) 52'; Biava (yellow card) 74', (goal) 82'; Palacio (yellow card) 88'	Report	Taddei 54'; Totti 64'; Andreolli (yellow card) 67'; Cassetti (yellow card) 82'	Stadium: Stadio Luigi Ferraris; Attendance: 25,414; Referee: Emidio Morganti

30 August 2009 2	Roma	1–3	Juventus	Rome
18:00 CEST (UTC+02:00)	De Rossi (yellow card) 20', (goal) 35'; Taddei (yellow card) 34'; Perrotta (yellow card) 36'	Report	Tiago (yellow card) 15'; Diego 25', 68', (yellow card) 36'; Marchisio (yellow card) 44'; Grygera (yellow card) 80'; Melo 90+3'	Stadium: Stadio Olimpico; Attendance: 57,500; Referee: Gianluca Rocchi

13 September 2009 3	Siena	1–2	Roma	Siena
15:00 CEST (UTC+02:00)	Maccarone 27'; Codrea (yellow card) 52' (yellow-red card) 78'; Terzi (yellow card) 88'	Report	Cassetti (yellow card) 56'; De Rossi (yellow card) 65'; Mexès 73', (yellow card) 90+3'; Riise 89'	Stadium: Stadio Artemio Franchi – Montepaschi Arena; Attendance: 10,045; Referee: Antonio Damato

20 September 2009 4	Roma	3–1	Fiorentina	Rome
20:45 CEST (UTC+02:00)	Totti 27' (pen.), 32'; De Rossi 41'	Report	Pasqual (yellow card) 13'; Dainelli (yellow card) 77'; Gamberini (yellow card) 82'; Gilardino 84'	Stadium: Stadio Olimpico; Attendance: 31,378; Referee: Nicola Rizzoli

23 September 2009 5	Palermo	3–3	Roma	Palermo
20:45 CEST (UTC+02:00)	Goian (yellow card) 11'; Budan 40', (yellow card) 65'; Miccoli 45+1'; Nocerino 56'; Migliaccio (yellow card) 61'; Kjær (yellow card) 80'; Rubinho (yellow card) 87'	Report	Brighi 20'; Burdisso 45'; Totti (yellow card) 43', (goal) 88' (pen.); Okaka (yellow card) 90'	Stadium: Stadio Renzo Barbera; Attendance: 21,111; Referee: Gianluca Rocchi

27 September 2009 6	Catania	1–1	Roma	Catania
15:00 CEST (UTC+02:00)	Morimoto 22', (yellow card) 66'; Carboni (yellow card) 44'; Potenza (yellow card) 56'; Biagianti (yellow card) 60'; Capuano (yellow card) 81'; Andújar (yellow card) 86'; Delvecchio (red card) 90+4'; Mascara (yellow card) 90+4'	Report	Burdisso (yellow card) 50'; Cerci (yellow card) 63'; De Rossi 90+2'	Stadium: Stadio Angelo Massimino; Attendance: 12,660; Referee: Massimiliano Saccani

4 October 2009 7	Roma	2–1	Napoli	Rome
15:00 CEST (UTC+02:00)	Vučinić (yellow card) 34'; Totti 37', 63'; Perrotta (yellow card) 51'	Report	Lavezzi 25'; Cannavaro (yellow card) 34'; Rinaudo (yellow card) 75'	Stadium: Stadio Olimpico; Attendance: 28,119; Referee: Luca Banti

18 October 2009 8	Milan	2–1	Roma	Milan
20:45 CEST (UTC+02:00)	Seedorf (yellow card) 45'; Ronaldinho 56' (pen.); Pato 67'; Ambrosini (yellow card) 69' (yellow-red card) 81'; Inzaghi (yellow card) 70'; Pirlo (yellow card) 80'; Nesta (yellow card) 83'	Report	Ménez 3', (yellow card) 66'; Doni (yellow card) 53'; Riise (yellow card) 55'; Pizarro (yellow card) 57'	Stadium: San Siro; Attendance: 40,000; Referee: Roberto Rosetti

25 October 2009 9	Roma	0–1	Livorno	Rome
15:00 CET (UTC+01:00)	Cassetti (yellow card) 68'; De Rossi (yellow card) 87'	Report	Tavano 40'; Pulzetti (yellow card) 52'; De Lucia (yellow card) 64' (yellow-red card) 64'; Migliónico (yellow card) 77'; Raimondi (yellow card) 87'	Stadium: Stadio Olimpico; Attendance: 28,328; Referee: Carmine Russo

28 October 2009 10	Udinese	2–1	Roma	Udine
20:45 CET (UTC+01:00)	Pasquale (yellow card) 15'; Floro Flores 21', 84'; Inler (yellow card) 26'; D'Agostino (yellow card) 39'; Basta (yellow card) 62' (yellow-red card) 78'; Di Natale (yellow card) 88'	Report	De Rossi 42', (yellow card) 61'; Cassetti (yellow card) 44'; Taddei (red card) 48'; Motta (yellow card) 66'; Guberti (yellow card) 76'	Stadium: Stadio Friuli; Attendance: 16,563; Referee: Antonio Damato

1 November 2009 11	Roma	2–1	Bologna	Rome
15:00 CET (UTC+01:00)	Vučinić 35', (yellow card) 39'; Perrotta 52', (yellow card) 52'	Report	Tedesco (yellow card) 27'; Adaílton 32'; Di Vaio (yellow card) 42'	Stadium: Stadio Olimpico; Attendance: 28,022; Referee: Leonardo Baracani

8 November 2009 12	Internazionale	1–1	Roma	Milan
20:45 CET (UTC+01:00)	Muntari (yellow card) 40'; Eto'o 48'; Motta (yellow card) 54'; Stanković (yellow card) 62'	Report	Vučinić 13'; Ménez (yellow card) 45+1'; Pizarro (yellow card) 78'	Stadium: San Siro; Attendance: 56,807; Referee: Gianluca Rocchi

22 November 2009 13	Roma	3–1	Bari	Rome
15:00 CET (UTC+01:00)	Totti 6' (pen.), 14', 28'; Mexès (yellow card) 44'; Andreolli (yellow card) 70'	Report	Ranocchia (yellow card) 63'; Andreolli 73' (o.g.); Donati (yellow card) 76'; Koman (yellow card) 87'; Almirón (yellow card) 90+3'	Stadium: Stadio Olimpico; Attendance: 41,248; Referee: Gabriele Gava

29 November 2009 14	Atalanta	1–2	Roma	Bergamo
15:00 CET (UTC+01:00)	Ceravolo 13'; Bellini (yellow card) 30'; Pellegrino (yellow card) 38'; De Ascentis (yellow card) 66'	Report	Vučinić 44'; Ménez (yellow card) 57'; Perrotta 64'	Stadium: Stadio Atleti Azzurri d'Italia; Attendance: 10,752; Referee: Paolo Tagliavento

6 December 2009 15	Roma	1–0	Lazio	Rome
20:45 CET (UTC+01:00)	Ménez (yellow card) 24'; Mexès (yellow card) 38'; Cassetti 79'; Pizarro (yellow card) 87' (yellow-red card) 88'	Report	Stendardo (yellow card) 34'; Baronio (yellow card) 45+3'; Mauri (yellow card) 81'	Stadium: Stadio Olimpico; Attendance: 54,273; Referee: Nicola Rizzoli

13 December 2009 16	Sampdoria	0–0	Roma	Genoa
20:45 CET (UTC+01:00)	Gastaldello (yellow card) 53'; Poli (yellow card) 60'; Lucchini (yellow card) 86'	Report	Burdisso (yellow card) 23'; Perrotta (yellow card) 59'; Totti (yellow card) 89'	Stadium: Stadio Luigi Ferraris; Attendance: 24,073; Referee: Antonio Damato

20 December 2009 17	Roma	2–0	Parma	Rome
15:00 CET (UTC+01:00)	Juan (yellow card) 14'; Burdisso 48'; Totti (yellow card) 51'; De Rossi (yellow card) 87'; Brighi 90+1'	Report	Lucarelli (yellow card) 11'; Paci (yellow card) 71' (yellow-red card) 87'; Panucci (yellow card) 79'	Stadium: Stadio Olimpico; Attendance: 36,899; Referee: Paolo Tagliavento

6 January 2010 18	Cagliari	2–2	Roma	Cagliari
15:00 CET (UTC+01:00)	Cossu (yellow card) 32'; Canini (yellow card) 57'; López 90+1'; Conti 90+3'	Report	Pizarro 52' (pen.); Perrotta 66', (yellow card) 90+1'; Riise (yellow card) 68'; Ménez (yellow card) 90+2'; De Rossi (yellow card) 90+5'	Stadium: Stadio Sant'Elia; Attendance: 15,000; Referee: Gianluca Rocchi

9 January 2010 19	Roma	1–0	Chievo	Rome
18:00 CET (UTC+01:00)	De Rossi 1'; Doni (red card) 11'	Report	Mandelli (yellow card) 33'; Yepes (yellow card) 45'; Mantovani (yellow card) 68'	Stadium: Stadio Olimpico; Attendance: 29,467; Referee: Paolo Mazzoleni

17 January 2010 20	Roma	3–0	Genoa	Rome
15:00 CET (UTC+01:00)	Perrotta 17'; Toni 45', 60'	Report		Stadium: Stadio Olimpico; Attendance: 31,746; Referee: Andrea Romeo

23 January 2010 21	Juventus	1–2	Roma	Turin
CET (UTC+01:00)	Del Piero 51'; Grosso (yellow card) 67'; Buffon (red card) 83'; Salihamidžić (yellow card) 86'	Report	De Rossi (yellow card) 60'; Burdisso (yellow card) 61'; Totti 68' (pen.); Taddei (yellow card) 71'; Riise 90+3'	Stadium: Stadio Olimpico di Torino; Attendance: 18,750; Referee: Paolo Tagliavento

31 January 2010 22	Roma	2–1	Siena	Rome
15:00 CET (UTC+01:00)	Riise 29'; Juan (yellow card) 65'; Burdisso (yellow card) 74'; Okaka 88', (yellow card) 89'	Report	Vergassola 41', (yellow card) 89'; Rosi (yellow card) 61'; Jajalo (yellow card) 63'	Stadium: Stadio Olimpico; Attendance: 30,537; Referee: Leonardo Baracani

7 February 2010 23	Fiorentina	0–1	Roma	Florence
20:45 CET (UTC+01:00)	Marchionni (yellow card) 45'; De Silvestri (yellow card) 57'	Report	Perrotta (yellow card) 32'; Vučinić 82'	Stadium: Stadio Artemio Franchi; Attendance: 27,442; Referee: Nicola Rizzoli

13 February 2010 24	Roma	4–1	Palermo	Rome
18:00 CET (UTC+01:00)	Brighi 33', 62'; Totti (yellow card) 43'; Baptista 53'; Ménez (yellow card) 72'; Riise 83'	Report	Kjær (yellow card) 29'; Miccoli (yellow card) 54', (goal) 80' (pen.)	Stadium: Stadio Olimpico; Attendance: 37,005; Referee: Paolo Tagliavento

21 February 2010 25	Roma	1–0	Catania	Rome
15:00 CET (UTC+01:00)	Vučinić 18'; Faty (yellow card) 83'; Perrotta (yellow card) 90+4'	Report	Mascara (yellow card) 36'; López (yellow card) 90+4'	Stadium: Stadio Olimpico; Attendance: 30,449; Referee: Mauro Bergonzi

28 February 2010 26	Napoli	2–2	Roma	Naples
15:00 CET (UTC+01:00)	Aronica (yellow card) 13'; Quagliarella (yellow card) 61'; Denis 75'; Hamšík 90' (pen.)	Report	Juan (yellow card) 31'; Baptista 58' (pen.); Vučinić 66'; Motta (yellow card) 87'	Stadium: Stadio San Paolo; Attendance: 50,832; Referee: Nicola Rizzoli

6 March 2010 27	Roma	0–0	Milan	Rome
20:45 CET (UTC+01:00)	Burdisso (yellow card) 41'; Pizarro (yellow card) 80'; Taddei (yellow card) 85'	Report	Flamini (yellow card) 30'; Bonera (yellow card) 38'; Pirlo (yellow card) 90+2'	Stadium: Stadio Olimpico; Attendance: 61,036; Referee: Paolo Tagliavento

14 March 2010 28	Livorno	3–3	Roma	Livorno
15:00 CET (UTC+01:00)	Lucarelli 9', 26', 72' (pen.), (yellow card) 27'; Di Gennaro (yellow card) 14'; Knežević (yellow card) 25'; Rivas (yellow card) 57'; Pieri (yellow card) 86'; Filippini (yellow card) 87'	Report	Pizarro (yellow card) 10', (goal) 28'; Perrotta 10'; Toni 19'; Ménez (yellow card) 29'; De Rossi (yellow card) 75'; Taddei (yellow card) 79'; Cerci (yellow card) 86'; Mexès (yellow card) 90+4'	Stadium: Stadio Armando Picchi; Attendance: 12,358; Referee: Andrea Gervasoni

20 March 2010 29	Roma	4–2	Udinese	Rome
20:45 CET (UTC+01:00)	Toni 15'; Vučinić 24', 66' (pen.), 82', (yellow card) 83'; Faty (yellow card) 31'; Juan (yellow card) 67'; Cassetti (yellow card) 78'	Report	Di Natale 38' (pen.), 61'; Isla (yellow card) 65'; Zapata (yellow card) 72'; Pasquale (yellow card) 87'	Stadium: Stadio Olimpico; Attendance: 34,138; Referee: Nicola Pierpaoli

24 March 2010 30	Bologna	0–2	Roma	Bologna
20:45 CET (UTC+01:00)	Mudingayi (yellow card) 68'; Lanna (yellow card) 72'; Mingazzini (yellow card) 84'; Raggi (yellow card) 90+1'	Report	Riise 48'; Toni (yellow card) 75'; Baptista 82', (yellow card) 89'	Stadium: Stadio Renato Dall'Ara; Attendance: 20,192; Referee: Antonio Damato

27 March 2010 31	Roma	2–1	Internazionale	Rome
18:00 CET (UTC+01:00)	De Rossi 17'; Ménez (yellow card) 26'; Perrotta (yellow card) 56'; Toni 72'; Brighi (yellow card) 90'	Report	Samuel (yellow card) 30'; Zanetti (yellow card) 31'; Motta (yellow card) 37'; Lúcio (yellow card) 54'; Milito 66'; Maicon (yellow card) 79'; Eto'o (yellow card) 83'; Chivu (yellow card) 90+1'	Stadium: Stadio Olimpico; Attendance: 61,898; Referee: Emidio Morganti

3 April 2010 32	Bari	0–1	Roma	Bari
15:00 CEST (UTC+02:00)	De Vezze (yellow card) 64'; Castillo (yellow card) 69'; Rivas (yellow card) 90+3'	Report	Vučinić 19'; Pizarro (yellow card) 85'	Stadium: Stadio San Nicola; Attendance: 43,773; Referee: Nicola Rizzoli

11 April 2010 33	Roma	2–1	Atalanta	Rome
15:00 CEST (UTC+02:00)	Vučinić 12'; Cassetti (yellow card) 23', (goal) 27'; Ménez (yellow card) 65'	Report	Manfredini (yellow card) 14'; Tiribocchi 53'; Padoin (yellow card) 62'; Pellegrino (yellow card) 69'; Doni (yellow card) 90+4'	Stadium: Stadio Olimpico; Attendance: 49,803; Referee: Gianluca Rocchi

18 April 2010 34	Lazio	1–2	Roma	Rome
18:30 CEST (UTC+02:00)	Rocchi 14'; Brocchi (yellow card) 30'; Kolarov (yellow card) 52'; Ledesma (yellow card) 90+1' (red card) 90+1'; Zárate (yellow card) 90+6'	Report	Riise (yellow card) 25'; De Rossi (yellow card) 37'; Totti (yellow card) 45+2'; Cassetti (yellow card) 46'; Juan (yellow card) 50'; Vučinić 53' (pen.), 63'; Taddei (yellow card) 88'; Toni (yellow card) 90'; Ménez (yellow card) 90'	Stadium: Stadio Olimpico; Attendance: 61,615; Referee: Paolo Tagliavento

25 April 2010 35	Roma	1–2	Sampdoria	Rome
20:45 CEST (UTC+02:00)	Totti 14'	Report	Ziegler (yellow card) 51'; Pazzini 52', 85'	Stadium: Stadio Olimpico; Attendance: 56,379; Referee: Antonio Damato

1 May 2010 36	Parma	1–2	Roma	Parma
18:00 CEST (UTC+02:00)	Jiménez (yellow card) 7' (yellow-red card) 88'; Džemaili (yellow card) 55'; Lucarelli (yellow card) 58'; Lanzafame 81', (yellow card) 86'	Report	Totti 5', (yellow card) 90'; Perrotta (yellow card) 15'; Cassetti (yellow card) 50'; Taddei 75'	Stadium: Stadio Ennio Tardini; Attendance: 21,323; Referee: Gianluca Rocchi

9 May 2010 37	Roma	2–1	Cagliari	Rome
15:00 CEST (UTC+02:00)	Pizarro (yellow card) 52'; Riise (yellow card) 72'; Totti 79', 83' (pen.)	Report	Nainggolan (yellow card) 55'; Nenê (yellow card) 69'; Lazzari 73'; Matri (yellow card) 74'	Stadium: Stadio Olimpico; Attendance: 50,291; Referee: Mauro Bergonzi

16 May 2010 38	Chievo	0–2	Roma	Verona
15:00 CEST (UTC+02:00)	Iori (yellow card) 57'	Report	Vučinić 39'; De Rossi 45+1'	Stadium: Stadio Marc'Antonio Bentegodi; Attendance: 28,136; Referee: Paolo Tagliavento

=== Coppa Italia ===
12 January 2010 Round of 16	Roma	3–1	Triestina	Rome
21:00 CET (UTC+01:00)	Vučinić 60'; Baptista 80'; Brighi 90+1'		Della Rocca 5' (pen.); Cottafava (yellow card) 52'	Stadium: Stadio Olimpico; Attendance: 7,241; Referee: Emidio Morganti

26 January 2010 Quarter-finals	Roma	1–0	Catania	Rome
21:00 CET (UTC+01:00)	Pizarro (yellow card) 39'; De Rossi (yellow card) 68', (goal) 74'		Bellusci (yellow card) 40' (yellow-red card) 58'; Augustyn (yellow card) 52' (yellow-red card) 72'	Stadium: Stadio Olimpico; Attendance: 14,479; Referee: Nicola Pierpaoli

4 February 2010 Semi-finals; First leg	Roma	2–0	Udinese	Rome
21:00 CET (UTC+01:00)	Vučinić 12'; Mexès 40'		D'Agostino (yellow card) 22'; Isla (yellow card) 87'	Stadium: Stadio Olimpico; Attendance: 19,746; Referee: Mauro Bergonzi

21 April 2010 Semi-finals; Second leg	Udinese	1–0 (1–2 agg.)	Roma	Udine
18:00 CEST (UTC+02:00)	Sánchez 81', (yellow card) 85'		Cassetti (yellow card) 58' (yellow-red card) 84'	Stadium: Stadio Friuli; Attendance: 20,000; Referee: Luca Banti

5 May 2010 Final	Internazionale	1–0	Roma	Rome
20:45 CEST (UTC+02:00)	Materazzi (yellow card) 35'; Milito 39'; Chivu (yellow card) 45'; Samuel (yellow card) 53'; Balotelli (yellow card) 88'		Burdisso (yellow card) 14'; Perrotta (yellow card) 37'; Mexès (yellow card) 44'; Totti (yellow card) 63' (red card) 87'	Stadium: Stadio Olimpico; Attendance: 55,000; Referee: Nicola Rizzoli

=== UEFA Europa League ===
==== Third qualifying round ====
30 July 2009 First leg	Roma (Italy)	3–1	(Belgium) Gent	Rome, Italy
20:45 CEST (UTC+02:00)	Totti (yellow card) 43', (goal) 55', 73' (pen.); Vučinić 85'	Report	Mbaye 22', (yellow card) 71'; Azofeifa (yellow card) 29'; Marić (yellow card) 51'; Thompson (yellow card) 54' (yellow-red card) 75'; Jorgačević (yellow card) 58'; Čustović (yellow card) 72'	Stadium: Stadio Olimpico; Attendance: 38,000; Referee: Paulo Costa (Portugal)

6 August 2009 Second leg	Gent (Belgium)	1–7 (2–10 agg.)	(Italy) Roma	Ghent, Belgium
20:30 CEST (UTC+02:00)	Marić (yellow card) 19'; Šuler (yellow card) 45' (yellow-red card) 45'; Smolders (yellow card) 47', (goal) 78'; Duarte (yellow card) 55'	Report	Totti 35', 56', 64' (pen.); De Rossi 58', 74'; Taddei (yellow card) 67'; Ménez 79'; Mexès (yellow card) 83'; Okaka 86'	Stadium: Jules Ottenstadion; Attendance: 11,800; Referee: Manuel Gräfe (Germany)

==== Play-off round ====
20 August 2009 First leg	Košice (Slovakia)	3–3	(Italy) Roma	Košice, Slovakia
16:30 CEST (UTC+02:00)	Milinković 5'; Novák 71' (pen.), 81'	Report	De Rossi (yellow card) 27'; Totti 38' (pen.), 67'; Ménez 52'	Stadium: Lokomotíva Stadium; Attendance: 8,450; Referee: Peter Rasmussen (Denmark)

27 August 2009 Second leg	Roma (Italy)	7–1 (10–4 agg.)	(Slovakia) Košice	Rome, Italy
20:45 CEST (UTC+02:00)	Totti 1', 6', 86'; Guberti 8'; Cerci 17'; Ménez 18'; Riise 70'	Report	Novák 38'	Stadium: Stadio Olimpico; Attendance: 16,145; Referee: Selçuk Dereli (Turkey)

==== Group stage ====
Pos	Team	Pld	W	D	L	GF	GA	GD	Pts	Qualification
1	(Italy) Roma	6	4	1	1	10	5	+5	13	Advance to knockout phase
2	(England) Fulham	6	3	2	1	8	6	+2	11	Advance to knockout phase
3	(Switzerland) Basel	6	3	0	3	10	7	+3	9	
4	(Bulgaria) CSKA Sofia	6	0	1	5	2	12	−10	1	

Source: Soccerway

17 September 2009 1	Basel (Switzerland)	2–0	(Italy) Roma	Basel, Switzerland
19:00 CEST (UTC+02:00)	Carlitos 11'; Cabral (yellow card) 33'; Costanzo (yellow card) 50'; Abraham (yellow card) 65'; Atan (yellow card) 73'; Almerares 87', (yellow card) 88'	Report	Ménez (yellow card) 45+1'; Pizarro (yellow card) 78'	Stadium: St. Jakob-Park; Attendance: 16,459; Referee: Carlos Velasco Carballo (Spain)

1 October 2009 2	Roma (Italy)	2–0	(Bulgaria) CSKA Sofia	Rome, Italy
21:05 CEST (UTC+02:00)	Okaka 19'; Perrotta 23'; Ménez (yellow card) 90+2'	Report		Stadium: Stadio Olimpico; Attendance: 20,000; Referee: Vladimír Hriňák (Slovakia)

22 October 2009 3	Fulham (England)	1–1	(Italy) Roma	London, England
21:05 CEST (UTC+02:00)	Hangeland 24'; Kelly (red card) 77'	Report	Vučinić (yellow card) 84'; Andreolli 90+3'	Stadium: Craven Cottage; Attendance: 23,561; Referee: Paul Allaerts (Belgium)

5 November 2009 4	Roma (Italy)	2–1	(England) Fulham	Rome, Italy
19:00 CET (UTC+01:00)	Andreolli (yellow card) 18'; Okaka (yellow card) 38', (goal) 76'; Riise 69'; De Rossi (yellow card) 72'	Report	Kamara 19' (pen.); Greening (yellow card) 34'; Hangeland (yellow card) 45'; Nevland (red card) 49'; Baird (yellow card) 89'; Konchesky (red card) 90+1'	Stadium: Stadio Olimpico; Attendance: 20,000; Referee: Kevin Blom (Netherlands)

3 December 2009 5	Roma (Italy)	2–1	(Switzerland) Basel	Rome, Italy
21:05 CET (UTC+01:00)	De Rossi (yellow card) 32'; Totti 32' (pen.); Ménez (yellow card) 44'; Vučinić 59'; Juan (yellow card) 90+2'	Report	Huggel 18'; Gelabert (yellow card) 32'; Carlitos (yellow card) 75'	Stadium: Stadio Olimpico; Attendance: 27,000; Referee: Tony Chapron (France)

16 December 2009 6	CSKA Sofia (Bulgaria)	0–3	(Italy) Roma	Sofia, Bulgaria
19:00 CET (UTC+01:00)	Petrov (yellow card) 28'; Stoyanov (yellow card) 55'	Report	Okaka (yellow card) 29'; Cerci (yellow card) 30', (goal) 45+1', 52'; Scardina 89'	Stadium: Vasil Levski National Stadium; Attendance: 10,000; Referee: Aleksandar Stavrev (Macedonia)

==== Knockout phase ====
===== Round of 32 =====
18 February 2010 First leg	Panathinaikos (Greece)	3–2	(Italy) Roma	Athens, Greece
21:05 CET (UTC+01:00)	Simão Mate (yellow card) 60'; Salpingidis 67', (yellow card) 80'; Christodoulopoulos 84'; Cissé 89'; Tzorvas (yellow card) 90+1'	Report	Pizarro (yellow card) 25', (goal) 81' (pen.); Vučinić 29'; Taddei (yellow card) 30'; Cerci (yellow card) 90'	Stadium: Olympic Stadium; Attendance: 54,274; Referee: Damir Skomina (Slovenia)

25 February 2010 Second leg	Roma (Italy)	2–3 (4–6 agg.)	(Greece) Panathinaikos	Rome, Italy
19:00 CET (UTC+01:00)	Riise 11'; De Rossi (yellow card) 39', (goal) 67'; Taddei (yellow card) 54'; Cassetti (yellow card) 84'; Mexès (yellow card) 90+2'	Report	Salpingidis (yellow card) 12'; Katsouranis (yellow card) 27' (yellow-red card) 90'; Marinos (yellow card) 37'; Cissé 40' (pen.), 45+1', (yellow card) 82'; Ninis 43'; Vyntra (yellow card) 77'	Stadium: Stadio Olimpico; Attendance: 47,825; Referee: Bruno Paixão (Portugal)

== Statistics ==
=== Appearances and goals ===
No.	Pos	Nat	Player	Total		Serie A		Coppa Italia		Europa League	
No.	Pos	Nat	Player	Apps	Goals	Apps	Goals	Apps	Goals	Apps	Goals
Goalkeepers
1	GK	(Romania) ROU	Bogdan Lobonț	3	0	0+2	0	0	0	1	0
12	GK	(Italy) ITA	Pietro Pipolo	0	0	0	0	0	0	0	0
25	GK	(Brazil) BRA	Artur	5	0	1	0	0	0	4	0
27	GK	(Brazil) BRA	Júlio Sérgio	37	0	30	0	2	0	4+1	0
32	GK	(Brazil) BRA	Doni	14	0	7	0	3	0	3+1	0
34	GK	(Romania) ROU	Alexandru Pena	0	0	0	0	0	0	0	0
Defenders
3	DF	(Italy) ITA	Marco Andreolli	15	1	4+4	0	1	0	5+1	1
4	DF	(Brazil) BRA	Juan	36	0	28+1	0	1+1	0	3+2	0
5	DF	(France) FRA	Philippe Mexès	32	2	16+3	1	4	1	9	0
13	DF	(Italy) ITA	Marco Motta	27	0	13+3	0	2+1	0	8	0
17	DF	(Norway) NOR	John Arne Riise	52	8	34+2	5	4	0	12	3
22	DF	(Italy) ITA	Max Tonetto	8	0	0+4	0	0+1	0	1+2	0
29	DF	(Argentina) ARG	Nicolás Burdisso	44	2	32+1	2	5	0	6	0
77	DF	(Italy) ITA	Marco Cassetti	38	2	26+3	2	3	0	3+3	0
Midfielders
7	MF	(Chile) CHI	David Pizarro	46	3	31	2	4	0	10+1	1
11	MF	(Brazil) BRA	Rodrigo Taddei	46	2	25+8	2	4	0	6+3	0
14	MF	(France) FRA	Ricardo Faty	11	0	2+6	0	2	0	0+1	0
16	MF	(Italy) ITA	Daniele De Rossi	49	11	33	7	4	1	12	3
20	MF	(Italy) ITA	Simone Perrotta	40	6	31+1	5	3	0	4+1	1
33	MF	(Italy) ITA	Matteo Brighi	32	5	15+9	4	2	1	5+1	0
Forwards
9	FW	(Montenegro) MNE	Mirko Vučinić	46	19	32+2	14	3+1	2	4+4	3
10	FW	(Italy) ITA	Francesco Totti	31	25	21+2	14	1+1	0	6	11
19	FW	(Brazil) BRA	Júlio Baptista	32	4	4+19	3	2+1	1	4+2	0
24	FW	(Italy) ITA	Alessio Cerci	19	3	2+7	0	1+1	0	5+3	3
30	FW	(Italy) ITA	Luca Toni	17	5	10+5	5	2	0	0	0
41	FW	(Italy) ITA	Filippo Scardina	1	1	0	0	0	0	0+1	1
42	FW	(Italy) ITA	Stefano Pettinari	2	0	0+1	0	0	0	0+1	0
94	FW	(France) FRA	Jérémy Ménez	37	4	18+5	1	1+3	0	6+4	3
Players transferred out during the season
2	DF	(Brazil) BRA	Cicinho	5	0	0+2	0	0+1	0	2	0
18	FW	(Italy) ITA	Mauro Esposito	1	0	0	0	0+1	0	0	0
21	MF	(Italy) ITA	Stefano Guberti	12	1	3+3	0	0	0	4+2	1
26	MF	(Romania) ROU	Adrian Piț	2	0	0+2	0	0	0	0	0
89	FW	(Italy) ITA	Stefano Okaka	14	4	0+7	1	1	0	5+1	3

Last updated: 16 May 2010
Source: Competitions

=== Goalscorers ===
Rank	No.	Pos	Nat	Name	Serie A	Coppa Italia	UEFA EL	Total
1	10	FW	(Italy)	Francesco Totti	14	0	11	25
2	9	FW	(Montenegro)	Mirko Vučinić	14	2	3	19
3	16	MF	(Italy)	Daniele De Rossi	7	1	3	11
4	17	DF	(Norway)	John Arne Riise	5	0	3	8
5	20	MF	(Italy)	Simone Perrotta	5	0	1	6
6	30	FW	(Italy)	Luca Toni	5	0	0	5
6	33	MF	(Italy)	Matteo Brighi	4	1	0	5
8	19	FW	(Brazil)	Júlio Baptista	3	1	0	4
8	89	FW	(Italy)	Stefano Okaka	1	0	3	4
8	94	FW	(France)	Jérémy Ménez	1	0	3	4
11	7	MF	(Chile)	David Pizarro	2	0	1	3
11	24	FW	(Italy)	Alessio Cerci	0	0	3	3
13	5	DF	(France)	Philippe Mexès	1	1	0	2
13	11	MF	(Brazil)	Rodrigo Taddei	2	0	0	2
13	29	DF	(Argentina)	Nicolás Burdisso	2	0	0	2
13	77	DF	(Italy)	Marco Cassetti	2	0	0	2
17	21	MF	(Italy)	Stefano Guberti	0	0	1	1
17	41	FW	(Italy)	Filippo Scardina	0	0	1	1
Own goal					0	0	0	0
Totals					68	6	34	108

Last updated: 16 May 2010

=== Clean sheets ===
Rank	No.	Pos	Nat	Name	Serie A	Coppa Italia	UEFA EL	Total
1	27	GK	(Brazil)	Júlio Sérgio	9	0	1	10
2	32	GK	(Brazil)	Doni	2	2	0	4
3	1	GK	(Romania)	Bogdan Lobonț	0	0	1	1
Totals					11	2	2	15

Last updated: 16 May 2010
