= Artur Moraes =

Brazilian footballer (born 1981)

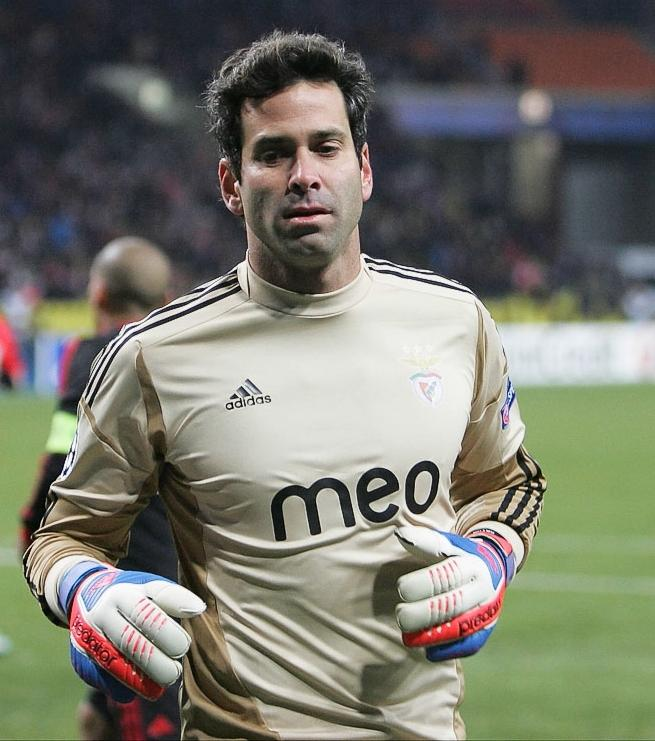
- Artur Moraes with Benfica in 2012

Personal information
- Full name: Artur Guilherme Moraes Gusmão
- Date of birth: 25 January 1981 (age 45)
- Place of birth: Leme, Brazil
- Height: 1.92 m (6 ft 4 in)
- Position: Goalkeeper

Youth career
- 1996–2001: Paulista

Senior career*
Years	Team	Apps	(Gls)
2001–2003	Paulista	0	(0)
2003–2007	Cruzeiro	43	(0)
2006–2007	→ Coritiba (loan)	25	(0)
2008	Siena	0	(0)
2008	→ Cesena (loan)	18	(0)
2008–2010	Roma	12	(0)
2010–2011	Braga	18	(0)
2011–2015	Benfica	85	(0)
2015–2017	Osmanlıspor	4	(0)
2017	Chapecoense	0	(0)
2018	Desportivo Aves	0	(0)
Total		205	(0)
- * Club domestic league appearances and goals

Artur Guilherme Moraes Gusmão (born 25 January 1981) is a former Brazilian professional footballer who played as a goalkeeper.

== Club career ==
=== Brazil ===
Artur Moraes started his career at Paulista. In 2003, he was loaned – and later signed – to Cruzeiro. For the 2006 and 2007 seasons, he was loaned to Coritiba. He became first-choice goalkeeper in the 2006 season, ahead Kleber and Rodrigo. In the 2007 season, however, Édson Bastos became first choice.

=== Italy ===
On 4 January 2008, Artur Moraes signed a two-year contract with Italian club Siena after his contract with Cruzeiro had expired. On 30 January, he was loaned to Cesena.

On 25 June 2008, Artur Moraes completed a transfer to Roma from Siena with his teammate Simone Loria in an exchange deal which had Roma goalkeeper Gianluca Curci move to Siena in a co-ownership deal and Roma midfielder Ahmed Barusso loaned to the Tuscan-based club. Daniele Galloppa, previously co-owned by Roma and Siena, became in effect a Siena player as part of the deal. Artur Moraes made his unofficial debut in Roma's first pre-season friendly of the 2008–09 season, a 3–1 defeat to Steaua București.

In April 2009, he became temporary first-choice after an injury to starter Doni, edging ahead of Júlio Sérgio and Pietro Pipolo. In the 2009–10 season, however, Artur Moraes was dropped, as the coach preferred Júlio Sérgio as first-choice, with Bogdan Lobonț and Doni his back-ups.

=== Portugal ===
==== Braga ====
In the summer 2010, Artur Moraes left for Portuguese side Braga, as the club had recently lost starter Eduardo and back-up Paweł Kieszek. Artur Moraes initially served as the backup to Mário Felgueiras as the 2010–11 UEFA Champions League third qualifying round, as new signing Quim was out injured. Artur then became Felipe's understudy, ahead of third-choice Marcos. After Felipe returned to Brazil in December, Artur became the first choice.

==== Benfica ====
On 16 May 2011, Artur Moraes signed a four-year deal with Benfica. He played consistently throughout his first season with Benfica, earning the nickname "King Artur".

In the 2012–13 season, Artur Moraes' performances worsened with various mistakes against Porto, Estoril and in the Portuguese Cup final defeat to Vitória de Guimarães. Despite this, manager Jorge Jesus maintained his confidence on him.

After a string of mistakes midway through the 2013–14 campaign, Jorge Jesus dropped him in favour of Jan Oblak, and the latter went on to keep several clean sheets in his first starts, notably in a 2–0 home win against Porto. He ended the season in the bench, and was told to look for a new club.

After Oblak's departure to Atlético Madrid, Artur Moraes regained his place in the starting XI in the Supertaça Cândido de Oliveira, being an important part in the victory over Rio Ave, saving three penalties in the shootout. On 31 August 2014, in a Lisbon derby, Artur Moraes erred by giving the ball away to Sporting Clube de Portugal striker Islam Slimani, who scored the equalizer. On 16 September 2014, in the first matchday of the 2014–15 Champions League group stage, against Zenit Saint Petersburg he was sent off in the 18th minute for a professional foul on Danny outside of the box. On 30 June 2015, he left Benfica as his contract expired.

=== Osmanlıspor / Chapecoense ===
On 11 July 2015, Artur Moraes signed a two-year contract with Turkish club Osmanlıspor. On 19 January 2017, he returned to Brazil and signed a one-year contract with Chapecoense.

== Club statistics ==
As of 4 April 2017

Club	Season	League			Cup		League Cup		Continental		Other		Total	
Club	Season	Division	Apps	Goals	Apps	Goals	Apps	Goals	Apps	Goals	Apps	Goals	Apps	Goals
Cruzeiro	2003	Série A	6	0	0	0	—		—		0	0	6	0
Cruzeiro	2004	Série A	35	0	—		—		5 (Note: One appearance in Copa Libertadores, four appearances in Copa Sudamericana)	0	3 (Note: Appearances in Campeonato Mineiro)	0	43	0
Cruzeiro	2005	Série A	2	0	0	0	—		2 (Note: Appearances in Copa Sudamericana)	0	0	0	4	0
Cruzeiro	Total		43	0	0	0	—		7	0	3	0	53	0
Coritiba (loan)	2006	Série B	25	0			—		—		—		25	0
Siena	2007–08	Serie A	0	0			—		—		—		0	0
Cesena (loan)	2007–08	Serie B	18	0			—		—		—		18	0
Roma	2008–09	Serie A	11	0	0	0	—		0	0	—		11	0
Roma	2009–10	Serie A	1	0	0	0	—		4 (Note: Appearances in UEFA Europa League)	0	—		5	0
Roma	Total		12	0	0	0	—		4	0	—		16	0
Braga	2010–11	Primeira Liga	18	0	1	0	2	0	10 (Note: Appearances in UEFA Europa League and UEFA Champions League)	0	—		31	0
Benfica	2011–12	Primeira Liga	29	0	0	0	—		14 (Note: Appearances in UEFA Champions League)	0	—		43	0
Benfica	2012–13	Primeira Liga	30	0	5	0	1	0	15	0	—		51	0
Benfica	2013–14	Primeira Liga	14	0	4	0	1	0	11	0	—		30	0
Benfica	2014–15	Primeira Liga	12	0	0	0	3	0	3	0	1 (Note: Appearance in Portuguese Super Cup)	0	19	0
Benfica	Total		85	0	9	0	5	0	43	0	1	0	143	0
Osmanlıspor	2015–16	Süper Lig	4	0	1	0	—		0	0	—		5	0
Osmanlıspor	2016–17	Süper Lig	0	0	0	0	—		—		—		0	0
Osmanlıspor	Total		4	0	1	0	0	0	0	0	0	0	5	0
Chapecoense	2017	Série A	0	0	0	0	—		3 (Note: Two appearances in Copa Libertadores, one appearance in Recopa Sudamericana)	0	12 (Note: Eleven appearances in Campeonato Catarinense, one appearance in Primeira Liga)	0	15	0
Career total			205	0	11	0	7	0	67	0	16	0	306	0

== Honours ==
Paulista

- Campeonato Brasileiro Série C: 2001

Cruzeiro

- Campeonato Brasileiro Série A: 2003
- Copa do Brasil: 2003
- Campeonato Mineiro: 2003, 2004

Coritiba

- Campeonato Brasileiro Série B: 2007

Braga

- UEFA Europa League: Runner-up 2010–11

Benfica

- Primeira Liga: 2013–14, 2014–15
- Taça de Portugal: 2013–14
- Taça da Liga: 2011–12, 2013–14, 2014–15
- Supertaça Cândido de Oliveira: 2014
- UEFA Europa League: Runner-up 2012–13, 2013–14

Chapecoense

- Campeonato Catarinense: 2017
