= Café (footballer) =

Brazilian footballer (born 1985)

Personal information
- Full name: Rodrigo Peters Marques
- Date of birth: 16 May 1985 (age 41)
- Place of birth: Curitiba, Brazil
- Height: 1.88 m (6 ft 2 in)
- Position: Goalkeeper

Youth career
- 2004–2005: Coritiba

Senior career*
Years	Team	Apps	(Gls)
2006–2007	Coritiba	1	(0)
2007–2008	Naval	1	(0)
2009	Barletta	2	(0)
2010	América (RJ)	2	(0)
2010–2011	Varese	0	(0)
2011–2012	Brussels	29	(0)
2013	Rio Branco (PR)	0	(0)
2014	Madureira	10	(0)
2015–2016	J. Malucelli	2	(0)
- * Club domestic league appearances and goals

Rodrigo Peters Marques (born 16 May 1985), known as Café, is a Brazilian footballer who plays as a goalkeeper.

He also holds an Italian passport as a second nationality. He was also known as Rodrigo early in his career.

== Biography ==
Born in Curitiba, Café started his career at Coritiba Foot Ball Club. He signed a five-year contract in January 2004. In the 2006 season, he was the third keeper behind Artur and Kleber. He played once with the club in 2007 Copa do Brasil during the first round, replacing Marcelo Bonan as starting XI who played the first leg of the first round. After Artur re-signed with club, Artur played the rest of the Cup matches. Since the signing of Édson Bastos, Café became the third choice.

=== Europe ===
In August 2007 he was signed by Naval along with Eanes. He was the third keeper of the team, behind Taborda and Wilson Júnior.

In February 2009, he left for Italian 4th level club Barletta. He was the backup keeper for Claudio Furlan.

In January 2010, he returned to Brazil, for América (RJ), and signed a one-year contract. He was the backup keeper for Roberto. He made his first start in 2010 Taça Rio, however he was sent off in the 89th minute.

Before the start of 2010 Campeonato Brasileiro Série D, in mid-2010, Café returned to Italy, for Serie B club Varese and as the third keeper behind Mathieu Moreau and Massimo Zappino. He played the pre-season friendly against A.C. Milan in July 2010.

In January 2011 he left for Brussels along with Edenilson Bergonsi as part of co-operation plan of the two clubs.

Circa 2013 he returned to Brazil for Rio Branco Sport Club, which he played in 2013 Campeonato Paranaense. In 2014, he was a player for Madureira Esporte Clube in 2014 Campeonato Carioca.

== Honours ==
- Campeonato Carioca: 2010
