= Adrian Piț =

Romanian footballer (born 1983)

Personal information
- Full name: Adrian Florin Piț
- Date of birth: 16 July 1983 (age 43)
- Place of birth: Ștei, Romania
- Height: 1.88 m (6 ft 2 in)
- Position: Midfielder

Team information
- Current team: Gloria LT Cermei
- Number: 29

Senior career*
Years	Team	Apps	(Gls)
2001–2003	UTA Arad	22	(0)
2003–2007	Bellinzona	73	(16)
2007–2010	Roma	2	(0)
2008–2009	→ Pisa (loan)	5	(0)
2010	→ Triestina (loan)	9	(0)
2010–2011	Universitatea Cluj	9	(0)
2011–2014	Khazar Lankaran	75	(9)
2014	Viitorul Constanța	1	(0)
2015	UTA Arad	7	(0)
2016	Frontiera Curtici	15	(2)
2017	Șoimii Lipova	10	(0)
2018–2021	Crișul Chișineu-Criș	47	(6)
2021–	Gloria LT Cermei	79	(5)
- * Club domestic league appearances and goals as of 22:12, 6 January 2025 (UTC)

Adrian Florin Piț (born 16 July 1983) is a Romanian footballer who plays as a midfielder for Liga III side Gloria Lunca-Teuz Cermei.

== Career ==
Piţ was born in Ştei.

He played with former teammate and countryman Cristian Ianu in UTA and Bellinzona, where he wore the number 10 shirt.

Piţ was signed by Roma from the Swiss Challenge League side AC Bellinzona on a free transfer, for a one-year contract which was later extended. Pit was subsequently loaned out to Serie B side Pisa for the 2008–09 season. But in February 2009, his loan was canceled.

He was successively confirmed with the AS Roma senior team for the 2009–10 season. He played his only match of the season so far as a substitute for Marco Cassetti at half-time of Coppa Italia Round 16 on 12 January 2010. He provided the assist for the winning goal in the 2–1 win over Siena on 31 January 2010.

Piţ was transferred to Liga I side Universitatea Cluj on 31 August 2010.

Piț left Khazar Lankaran on 26 July 2013, following their 0–8 home defeat to Maccabi Haifa in the 2nd Qualifying round of the 2013–14 UEFA Europa League. Piț re-signed with Khazar late in November, making his second debut for the club on 30 November in a 1–1 draw against AZAL.

== Career statistics ==
As of 4 February 2018

Appearances and goals by club, season and competition
Club	Season	League			Cup		Other		Total	
Club	Season	Division	App	Goals	App	Goals	App	Goals	App	Goals
Roma	2007–08	Serie A	0	0	1	0	0	0	1	0
Roma	2009–10	Serie A	2	0	1	0	–		3	0
Roma	Total		2	0	2	0	0	0	4	0
Pisa Calcio (loan)	2008–09	Serie B	5	0	0	0	–		5	0
Triestina (loan)	2009–10	Serie B	9	0	0	0	–		9	0
Universitatea Cluj	2010–11	Liga II	9	0	2	1	–		11	1
Khazar Lankaran	2010–11	Azerbaijan Premier League	12	1	4	0	–		16	1
Khazar Lankaran	2011–12	Azerbaijan Premier League	30	3	3	0	2	0	35	3
Khazar Lankaran	2012–13	Azerbaijan Premier League	28	4	5	0	4	0	37	4
Khazar Lankaran	2013–14	Azerbaijan Premier League	5	1	2	0	4	0	11	1
Khazar Lankaran	Total		75	9	14	0	10	0	99	9
Viitorul Constanța	2014–15	Liga I	1	0	1	0	0	0	2	0
Career total			101	9	19	1	10	0	130	10
