= Pietro Pipolo =

Italian footballer (born 1986)

Personal information
- Full name: Pietro Pipolo
- Date of birth: 27 February 1986 (age 40)
- Place of birth: Marino, Italy
- Height: 1.87 m (6 ft 1 1/2 in)
- Position: Goalkeeper

Youth career
- Roma

Senior career*
Years	Team	Apps	(Gls)
2003–2009	Roma	0	(0)
2007–2008	→ Potenza (loan)	7	(0)
2009–2010	Lugano	0	(0)
- * Club domestic league appearances and goals as of 1 July 2010

Pietro Pipolo (born 27 February 1986) is an Italian professional footballer who plays as a goalkeeper.

== Club career ==
Pipolo is a product of Roma's youth system. During his time with the club, he was a member of the under-17 squad that reached the final of the Campionato Nazionale Allievi in 2003, losing 2–0 to Milan, and of the under-20 squad who won the Campionato Nazionale Primavera in 2005, defeating Atalanta 2–0 in the final.

Since the 2004–05 season Pipolo had been assigned a first team shirt number, but made no appearances throughout three seasons, as he served as third- or fourth-choice goalkeeper. For the 2007–08 campaign, he was subsequently loaned out to Serie C1 side Potenza, where he made up a total of 7 league appearances. Back from the loan spell, Pipolo spent another year with the Roman club, once again making no appearances, as he faced competition from Brazilian trio, Doni, Júlio Sérgio and Artur.

After his contract with Roma expired, Pipolo signed a one-year deal with Swiss Challenge League club Lugano at the beginning of the 2009–10 season.
