= Kléber (footballer, born 1970) =

Brazilian footballer

Personal information
- Full name: Kléber Guerra Marques
- Date of birth: 21 February 1970 (age 56)
- Place of birth: Buriti Alegre, Brazil
- Height: 1.87 m (6 ft 1 1/2 in)
- Position: Goalkeeper

Youth career
- Goiás

Senior career*
Years	Team	Apps	(Gls)
1991–1998	Goiás		
1998–2000	Atlético Mineiro	13	(0)
2001–2002	Botafogo	3	(0)
2002–2005	Fluminense	104	(1)
2006	Coritiba	13	(0)
- * Club domestic league appearances and goals

Kléber Guerra Marques (born 21 February 1970), known as just Kléber, is a former Brazilian footballer.

Born in Buriti Alegre, Goiás, Kléber started his career at state capital Goiânia, which he made his national league debut in 1991 Campeonato Brasileiro Série A season. He followed the club relegated to Campeonato Brasileiro Série B at the end of 1993 season. Since returned to the top division in 1996 season, he was the first choice. In 1998 season, he lost his starting place to Ricardo Pinto. In mid-1998, he left for Atlético Mineiro.

In 2001, he left for Botafogo, he played 4 out 6 matches of 2002 Copa do Brasil before left for city rival Fluminense. He was the first choice keeper, ahead Murilo. He lost the starting place in 2004 season to Fernando Henrique but regained the place in 2005 season.

In 2006 season he left for Série B side Coritiba, as understudy of Artur. After the season, he retired. He then became a personal manager for the footballer and one of partner of KGM SPORTS (former Fair Play Sports) in 2007. He was the first client of Fair Play Sports which found by FIFA licensed agent Daniel de Paiva in 2003.
