= 2007–08 AC Cesena season =

A.C. Cesena
2007–08 season
- President: Giorgio Lugaresi
- Head coach: Fabrizio Castori (until 12 November); Giovanni Vavassori (from 12 November until 25 February); Fabrizio Castori (from 25 February)
- Stadium: Stadio Dino Manuzzi
- Serie B: 22nd (relegated)
- Coppa Italia: Round 1
- Top goalscorer: League: Davide Moscardelli (15); All: Davide Moscardelli (15)
- Biggest win: Cesena 3–0 Frosinone
- Biggest defeat: Napoli 4–0 Cesena

The 2007–08 season was A.C. Cesena's 68th season in existence and the club's fourth consecutive season in the second division of Italian football. In addition to the domestic league, Cesena participated in this season's editions of the Coppa Italia. The season covers the period from 1 July 2007 to 30 June 2008.

== Pre-season and friendlies ==
Win Draw Loss

== Competitions ==
=== Overview ===
Competition	First match	Last match	Starting round	Final position	Record							
Competition	First match	Last match	Starting round	Final position	Pld	W	D	L	GF	GA	GD	Win %
Serie B	25 August 2007	1 June 2008	Matchday 1	22nd	42	5	17	20	37	66	−29	11.90
Coppa Italia	15 August 2007		Round 1	Round 1	1	0	0	1	0	4	−4	0.00
Total					43	5	17	21	37	70	−33	11.63

Source: Competitions

=== Serie B ===
==== League table ====
Pos	Team	Pld	W	D	L	GF	GA	GD	Pts	Promotion or relegation
18	Treviso	42	11	12	19	41	52	−11	45	
19	Avellino (T)	42	8	12	22	42	64	−22	36	Spared from relegation (Note: Initially, no relegation playoffs held as Treviso was more than 4 points clear of 4th-last place. Subsequently Avellino readmitted into Serie B in place of Messina.)
20	Ravenna (R)	42	8	11	23	48	75	−27	35	Relegation to Lega Pro 1ªDiv
21	Spezia (Note: 1 point deducted for late tax payment. Subsequently placed in Serie D for financial problems.) (E, R, E, R)	42	6	16	20	45	66	−21	33	Relegation to Serie D
22	Cesena (R)	42	5	17	20	37	66	−29	32	Relegation to Lega Pro 1ªDiv

Source: Panini
Rules for classification: 1) points; 2) head-to-head points; 3) head-to-head goal difference; 4) head-to-head goals scored; 5) goal difference; 6) number of goals scored.
(E) Eliminated; (R) Relegated; (T) Qualified, but not yet for the particular phase indicated

==== Results summary ====
Overall								Home						Away					
Pld	W	D	L	GF	GA	GD	Pts	W	D	L	GF	GA	GD	W	D	L	GF	GA	GD
42	5	17	20	37	66	−29	32	5	12	4	25	22	+3	0	5	16	12	44	−32

==== Results by round ====
Round	1	2	3	4	5	6	7	8	9	10	11	12	13	14	15	16	17	18	19	20	21	22	23	24	25	26	27	28	29	30	31	32	33	34	35	36	37	38	39	40	41	42
Ground	H	A	H	A	H	A	H	H	A	H	A	A	H	A	H	A	H	A	H	A	H	A	H	A	H	A	H	A	A	H	A	H	H	A	H	A	H	A	H	A	H	A
Result	D	L	L	D	D	L	D	D	D	D	L	L	L	L	D	L	W	L	W	D	D	L	W	L	D	L	L	L	L	W	D	D	D	L	L	L	D	L	W	L	D	D
Position	8	15	17	19	18	20	20	20	20	20	20	22	22	22	22	22	22	22	20	21	20	22	20	20	21	21	21	21	22	21	21	21	20	21	21	22	22	22	22	22	22	22

A = Away; H = Home; W = Win; D = Draw; L = Loss

==== Matches ====
25 August 2007 1	Cesena	1–1	Chievo	Cesena
				Stadium: Stadio Dino Manuzzi

1 September 2007 2	Messina	1–0	Cesena	Messina
				Stadium: Stadio San Filippo

9 September 2007 3	Cesena	1–2	Pisa	Cesena
				Stadium: Stadio Dino Manuzzi

15 September 2007 4	Grosseto	0–0	Cesena	Grosseto
				Stadium: Stadio Olimpico Carlo Zecchini

22 September 2007 5	Cesena	3–3	Vicenza	Cesena
				Stadium: Stadio Dino Manuzzi

25 September 2007 6	AlbinoLeffe	1–0	Cesena	Bergamo
				Stadium: Stadio Atleti Azzurri d'Italia

29 September 2007 7	Cesena	0–0	Bologna	Cesena
				Stadium: Stadio Dino Manuzzi

6 October 2007 8	Cesena	1–1	Brescia	Cesena
				Stadium: Stadio Dino Manuzzi

14 October 2007 9	Modena	1–1	Cesena	Modena
				Stadium: Stadio Alberto Braglia

20 October 2007 10	Cesena	0–0	Bari	Cesena
				Stadium: Stadio Dino Manuzzi

27 October 2007 11	Ascoli	5–2	Cesena	Ascoli Piceno
				Stadium: Stadio Cino e Lillo Del Duca

30 October 2007 12	Mantova	4–1	Cesena	Mantua
				Stadium: Stadio Danilo Martelli

10 November 2007 14	Rimini	4–1	Cesena	Rimini

24 November 2007 16	Triestina	2–1	Cesena	Trieste
				Stadium: Stadio Nereo Rocco

1 December 2007 15	Cesena	1–1	Spezia	Cesena
				Stadium: Stadio Dino Manuzzi

4 December 2007 13	Cesena	0–1	Lecce	Cesena
				Stadium: Stadio Dino Manuzzi

8 December 2007 17	Cesena	3–0	Frosinone	Cesena
				Stadium: Stadio Dino Manuzzi

15 December 2007 18	Avellino	3–1	Cesena	Avellino
				Stadium: Stadio Partenio

22 December 2007 19	Cesena	4–1	Treviso	Cesena
				Stadium: Stadio Dino Manuzzi

12 January 2008 20	Piacenza	0–0	Cesena	Piacenza
				Stadium: Stadio Leonardo Garilli

19 January 2008 21	Cesena	1–1	Ravenna	Cesena
				Stadium: Stadio Dino Manuzzi

26 January 2008 22	Chievo	3–1	Cesena	Verona
				Stadium: Stadio Marcantonio Bentegodi

2 February 2008 23	Cesena	1–0	Messina	Cesena
				Stadium: Stadio Dino Manuzzi

9 February 2008 24	Pisa	3–0	Cesena	Pisa
				Stadium: Arena Garibaldi

12 February 2008 25	Cesena	0–0	Grosseto	Cesena
				Stadium: Stadio Dino Manuzzi

16 February 2008 26	Vicenza	1–0	Cesena	Vicenza
				Stadium: Stadio Romeo Menti

23 February 2008 27	Cesena	0–3	AlbinoLeffe	Cesena
				Stadium: Stadio Dino Manuzzi

1 March 2008 28	Bologna	2–1	Cesena	Bologna
				Stadium: Stadio Renato dall'Ara

8 March 2008 29	Brescia	3–0	Cesena	Brescia
				Stadium: Stadio Mario Rigamonti

15 March 2008 30	Cesena	2–1	Modena	Cesena
				Stadium: Stadio Dino Manuzzi

18 March 2008 31	Bari	0–0	Cesena	Bari
				Stadium: Stadio San Nicola

21 March 2008 32	Cesena	1–1	Ascoli	Cesena
				Stadium: Stadio Dino Manuzzi

29 March 2008 33	Cesena	1–1	Mantova	Cesena
				Stadium: Stadio Dino Manuzzi

5 April 2008 34	Lecce	3–0	Cesena	Lecce
				Stadium: Stadio Via del Mare

12 April 2008 35	Cesena	1–2	Rimini	Cesena
				Stadium: Stadio Dino Manuzzi

19 April 2008 36	Spezia	1–0	Cesena	La Spezia
				Stadium: Stadio Alberto Picco

26 April 2008 37	Cesena	1–1	Triestina	Cesena
				Stadium: Stadio Dino Manuzzi

3 May 2008 38	Frosinone	5–2	Cesena	Frosinone
				Stadium: Stadio Matusa

10 May 2008 39	Cesena	1–0	Avellino	Cesena
				Stadium: Stadio Dino Manuzzi

17 May 2008 40	Treviso	2–1	Cesena	Treviso
				Stadium: Stadio Omobono Tenni

25 May 2008 41	Cesena	2–2	Piacenza	Cesena
				Stadium: Stadio Dino Manuzzi

1 June 2008 42	Ravenna	0–0	Cesena	Ravenna
				Stadium: Stadio Bruno Benelli

=== Coppa Italia ===
15 August 2007 Round 1	Napoli	4–0	Cesena	Naples
20:45	Calaiò 21'; Hamšík 40'; De Zerbi 74'; Domizzi 90+2'			Stadium: Stadio San Paolo; Attendance: 19,882; Referee: Massimiliano Velotto
