= Filippo Scardina =

Italian footballer

Personal information
- Full name: Filippo Maria Scardina
- Date of birth: 26 February 1992 (age 34)
- Place of birth: Rome, Italy
- Height: 1.83 m (6 ft 0 in)
- Position: Forward

Team information
- Current team: Parioli

Youth career
- –2010: Roma

Senior career*
Years	Team	Apps	(Gls)
2009–2015	Roma	0	(0)
2010–2011	→ Como (loan)	15	(0)
2011	→ Viareggio (loan)	29	(1)
2012–2013	→ Gubbio (loan)	14	(1)
2013	→ Poggibonsi (loan)	11	(0)
2013–2014	→ Poggibonsi (loan)	31	(4)
2014–2015	→ Pontedera (loan)	2	(0)
2015–2016	Racing Roma	20	(1)
2016	ACR Messina	9	(1)
2016–2017	Siracusa	35	(6)
2017–2018	Pro Vercelli	0	(0)
2017–2018	→ Siracusa (loan)	31	(6)
2018–2019	Pro Piacenza	15	(4)
2019	Fano	17	(0)
2019–2020	Sicula Leonzio	26	(6)
2020–2022	Pergolettese	58	(11)
2022–2023	Fiorenzuola	15	(1)
2023–2024	Team Altamura	4	(1)
2024–	Parioli		

International career
2010	Italy U20	2	(0)
- * Club domestic league appearances and goals as of 5 May 2024

Filippo Maria Scardina (born 26 February 1992) is an Italian footballer who plays as a forward for Parioli.

== Career ==
Scardina was called up to Roma's first team against CSKA Sofia in the UEFA Europa League. He entered as a substitute for Stefano Okaka Chuka in the 81st minute and scored a goal 8 minutes later, setting the final score on a 3–0 win for Roma; he became the youngest the debutant in the history of the club. However this was his only cap with the club.

After not finding space within Roma's main team, he was sent out on loan and has been in force to U.S. Poggibonsi since 2012.

On 28 July 2018, he joined Pro Piacenza.

On 14 January 2019, he signed a 2.5-year contract with Fano.

On 7 July 2019, he moved to Sicula Leonzio.

On 27 August 2020 he signed with Pergolettese.

On 5 July 2022, Scardina moved to Fiorenzuola.

== Personal life ==
His mother is the actress Fiorenza Marchegiani.
